= List of United States Navy ships: W–Z =

Ships of the United States Navy

Ships in current service
- Current ships

Ships grouped alphabetically
- A–B; C; D–F; G–H; I–K; L; M; N–O; P; Q–R; S; T–V; W–Z

Ships grouped by type
- Aircraft carriers; Airships; Amphibious warfare ships; Auxiliaries; Battlecruisers; Battleships; Cruisers; Destroyers; Destroyer escorts; Destroyer leaders; Escort carriers; Frigates; Hospital ships; Littoral combat ships; Mine warfare vessels; Monitors; Oilers; Patrol vessels; Registered civilian vessels; Sailing frigates; Steam frigates; Steam gunboats; Ships of the line; Sloops of war; Submarines; Torpedo boats; Torpedo retrievers; Unclassified miscellaneous; Yard and district craft

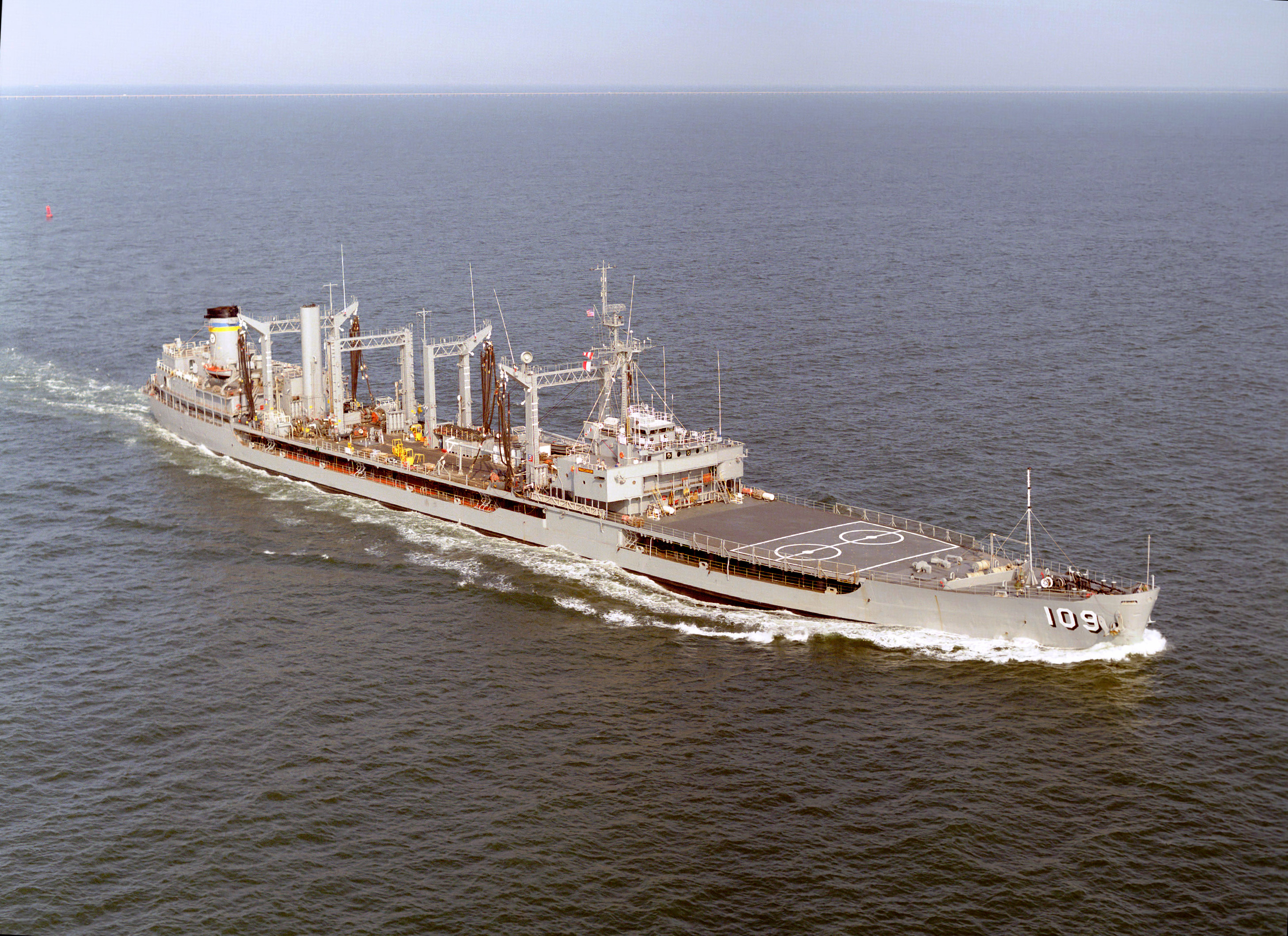
USNS Waccamaw (T-AO-109)

This section of the list of United States Navy ships contains all ships of the United States Navy with names beginning with W to Z.

For a list exclusively of currently commissioned ships, see the List of current ships of the United States Navy.

For ships with unique names, "USS Ship‍name" redirects to the ship article. For reused names, "USS Ship‍name" is an index page for the ships of that name; the links after the name lead to the specific ship pages.

== W ==
=== W–Wal ===
- USS W. F. Babcock (ID-1239)
- USS W. F. Marty (SP-1145)
- USS W. L. Bartlett (1861)
- USS W. L. Messick (SP-322)
- USS W. L. Steed (ID-3449)
- USS W. S. Sims (DE-1059/FF-1059)
- USS W. T. James (SP-429)
- USS W. W. Burns (1861)
- USS Wa'a Hele Honua (YFB-83)
- USS Waban (1880)
- USS Wabanquot (YTB-525/YTM-525)
- USS Wabaquasset (YTB-724)
- USS Wabash (1855, ID-1824, AOG-4/T-AOG-4, AOR-5)
- USS Waccamaw (AO-109/T-AO-109/T-AOT-109)
- USS Wachapreague (AVP-56/AGP-8)
- USS Wachusett (1861, ID-1840)
- USS Wachusetts (SP-548)
- USS Wacissa (AOG-59/T-AOG-59)
- USS Wacondah (SP-238)
- USS Waddell (DDG-24)
- USS Wadena (SP-158)
- USS Wadleigh (DD-689)
- USS Wadsworth (DD-60, DD-516, FFG-9)
- USS Wagner (DE-539/DER-539)
- USS Wahaka (YTB-526/YTM-526)
- USS Wahkiakum County (LST-1162/T-LST-1162)
- USS Wahneta (YT-1, YT-134/YTM-134)
- USS Wahoo (SS-238, SS-518, SS-516, SS-565, SSN-806)
- Wahpeton (YTB-527/YTM-527, YTM-757)
- USS Wahtah (YT-140/YTB-140/YTM-140)
- USS Wailaki (YTB-706)
- USS Wainwright (DD-62, DD-419, DLG-28/CG-28)
- USS Wake (PR-3)
- USS Wake Island (CVE-65)
- USS Wakefield (AP-21)
- USS Wakiva II (SP-160)
- USS Wakonda (YTB-528)
- USS Wakulla (ID-3147, AOG-44)
- USS Waldo County (LST-1163/T-LST-1163)
- USS Waldron (DD-699)
- USS Walke (DD-34, DD-416, DD-723)
- USS Walker (DD-163/DCH-1/IX-44, DD-517)
- USS Wallace L. Lind (DD-703)
- USS Wallacut (YTB-420/YTM-420)
- USS Waller (DD-466/DDE-466)
- USNS Wally Schirra (T-AKE-8)
- USS Walnut (YN-31)
- USS Walrus (SS-35, SS-431, SS-437)
- USS Walsh (DE-601/APD-111)
- USS Walter A. Luckenbach (ID-3171)
- USS Walter Adams (SP-400)
- USS Walter B. Cobb (DE-596/APD-106)
- USS Walter C. Wann (DE-412)
- USS Walter D. Munson (ID-1510)
- USS Walter Forward (1841)
- USS Walter S. Brown (DE-258)
- USNS Walter S. Diehl (T-AO-193)
- USS Walter S. Gorka (DE-604/APD-114)
- USS Walter X. Young (DE-715/APD-131, DE-723)
- USS Walton (DE-361)
- USS Walworth County (LST-1164/T-LST-1164)

=== Wam–Was ===
- USS Wampanoag (1864, ATA-202)
- USS Wampatuck (YT-337)
- USS Wamsutta (1853)
- USS Wanaloset (1865)
- USS Wanamassa (YTB-820)
- USS Wandank (AT-26/ATO-26, ATA-204)
- USS Wandena (SP-354)
- USS Wanderer (1857, SP-132, SP-2440)
- USS Wanderlust (SP-923)
- USS Wando (1864, AT-17/YT-123/YTB-123)
- USS Waneta (YT-384/YTB-384/YTM-384)
- USS Wanka (1901)
- USS Wannalancet (YTB-385)
- USS Wantuck (DE-692/APD-125)
- USS Wapakoneta (PC-579, YTB-766)
- USS Wapasha (YN-45/YNT-13/YTB-737)
- USS Wapato (YTB-788)
- USS Wapello (YN-56/YNT-24)
- USS War Bug (SP-1795)
- USS War Hawk (AP-168)
- USS Warbler (AM-53/ARS-11, AMS-206/MSC-206)
- USS Ward (DD-139/APD-16)
- USS Warren (1775, 1776, 1799, 1827, AP-98/APA-53)
- USS Warren J. Courtney (SP-375)
- USS Warrick (AKA-89)
- USS Warrington (DD-30, DD-383, DD-843)
- USS Warrior (MCM-10)
- USS Wasaka III (SP-342)
- USS Wasatch (AGC-9)
- USS Washakie (YT-386/YTB-386/YTM-386)
- USS Washburn (AKA-108/LKA-108)
- USS Washington (1775, 1776 row galley, 1776 frigate, 1776 lateen-rigged galley, 1814, 1833, 1837, ACR-11, SP-1241, BB-47, BB-56, SSN-787)
- USNS Washington Chambers (T-AKE-11)
- USS Washoe County (LST-1165/T-LST-1165)
- USS Washtenaw (AK-218)
- USS Washtenaw County (LST-1166/MSS-2)
- USS Washtucna (YTB-826)
- USS Wasmuth (DD-338/DMS-15)
- USS Wasp (1775, 1807, 1810, 1813, 1814, 1865, 1893, SP-1159, CV-7, CV-18, LHD-1)
- USS Wassaic (ID-3230)
- USS Wassuc (1865, CMc-3)

=== Wat–Way ===
- USS Watauga (1864)
- USS Watch (1861)
- USS Watchman (AGR-16)
- USS Water Lily (1895)
- USS Water Witch (1845, 1847, 1851)
- USS Wateree (1863, AT-117/ATF-117, AT-174/ATA-174/T-ATA-174)
- USS Waterford (ARD-5)
- USS Waterman (DE-740)
- USS Waters (DD-115/APD-8, T-AGS-45)
- USS Watertown (T-AGM-6)
- USS Wathena (ID-3884, YTB-825)
- USNS Watkins (T-AKR-315)
- USS Watonwan (ID-4296)
- USS Watseka (YT-387/YTB-387/YTM-387)
- USS Watson (DD-482, T-AKR-310)
- USS Watts (DD-567)
- USS Waubansee (YTB-366)
- USS Waubesa (ID-3955)
- USS Waukegan (YTM-755)
- USS Waukesha (AKA-84)
- USS Waupaca (AOG-46)
- USS Wauseon (PC-1229)
- USS Wautaga (1863)
- USS Wautauga (AOG-22)
- USS Wauwatosa (YTB-775)
- USS Wave (1836, 1863, SP-1706, YFB-10)
- USS Waverly (PC-1225)
- USS Wawasee (YTB-367/YTM-367)
- USS Waxahachie (YTB-814)
- USS Waxbill (AMc-15, AMS-39/AMCU-50/MHC-50, AM-414)
- USS Waxsaw (1865, YN-120/AN-91)
- USS Waxwing (AM-389/MSF-389)
- USS Wayne (AP-99/APA-54)
- USS Wayne E. Meyer (DDG-108)
- USS Waynesburg (PC-777)

=== We ===
- USS Weasel (1822)
- USS Weatherford (PC-618/EPC-618)
- USS Weaver (DE-741)
- USS Weber (DE-675/APD-75)
- USS Webster (ARV-2, T-AG-190)
- USS Wedderburn (DD-684)
- USS Weeden (DE-797)
- USS Weehawken (1862, CM-12, YTB-776)
- USS Weeks (DE-285)
- USS Weepoose (SP-405)
- USS Wego (SP-1196)
- USS Weight (ARS-35)
- USS Weiss (DE-378, DE-719/APD-135/LPR-135)
- USS Welborn C. Wood (DD-195)
- USS Welch (PC-817, PGM-93/PG-93)
- USS Welcome (SP-1175)
- USS Welles (DD-257, DD-628)
- USS Wemootah (SP-201)
- USS Wenatchee (AT-118/ATF-118, YTB-808)
- USS Wendy (SP-448)
- USS Wenonah (SP-165, YT-148/YTB-148/YTM-148)
- USS Wesson (DE-184)
- USS West Alsek (ID-3119)
- USS West Apaum (ID-3221)
- USS West Arrow (ID-2585)
- USS West Avenal (ID-3871)
- USS West Bridge (ID-2888)
- USS West Carnifax (ID-3812)
- USS West Caruth (ID-3850)
- USS West Cheswald (ID-4199)
- USS West Coast (ID-3315)
- USS West Cobalt (ID-3836)
- USS West Cohas (ID-3253)
- USS West Compo (ID-3912)
- USS West Conob (ID-4033)
- USS West Corum (ID-3982)
- USS West Cressey (ID-3813)
- USS West Ekonk (ID-3313)
- USS West Elcajon (ID-3907)
- USS West Elcasco (ID-3661)
- USS West Eldara (ID-3704)
- USS West Florida (1779)
- USS West Galeta (ID-3330)
- USS West Galoc (ID-3347)
- USS West Gambo (ID-3220)
- USS West Gate (ID-3216)
- USS West Gotomska (ID-3322)
- USS West Grama (ID-3794)
- USS West Haven (ID-2159)
- USS West Hobomac (ID-3335)
- USS West Honaker (ID-4455)
- USS West Hosokie (ID-3695)
- USS West Humhaw (ID-3718)
- USS West Indian (ID-3120)
- USS West Kyska (ID-3701)
- USS West Lashaway (ID-3700)
- USS West Lewark (ID-4490)
- USS West Lianga (ID-2758)
- USS West Loquassuck (ID-3638)
- USS West Madaket (ID-3636)
- USS West Mahomet (ID-3681)
- USS West Maximus (ID-3924)
- USS West Mead (ID-3550)
- USS West Milton (ARD-7)
- USS West Mount (ID-3202)
- USS West Nilus (ID-4445)
- USS West Nohno (ID-4029)
- USS West Point (ID-3254, AP-23)
- USS West Shore (ID-3170)
- USS West View (1918)
- USS West Virginia (ACR-5, BB-48, SSBN-736)
- USS West Wauna (ID-3856)
- USS West Wood (ID-2812)
- USS West Zeda (ID-3801)
- USS West Zucker (ID-3584)
- USS West Zula (ID-3501)
- USS Westchester (ID-3103, ID-3122, AK-219)
- USS Westchester County (LST-1167)
- USS Westerdijk (ID-2514)
- USS Westerly (PC-1198)
- USS Western Ally (ID-3815)
- USS Western Belle (ID-3551)
- USS Western Chief (ID-3161)
- USS Western Comet (ID-3569)
- USS Western Front (ID-1787)
- USS Western Hope (ID-3771)
- USS Western Knight (1918)
- USS Western Light (ID-3300)
- USS Western Maid (ID-3703)
- USS Western Ocean (ID-3151)
- USS Western Plains (ID-3741)
- USS Western Port (1853)
- USS Western Sea (ID-3153)
- USS Western Spirit (ID-3164)
- USS Western Star (ID-4210)
- USS Western World (1856)
- USS Westerner (ID-2890)
- USS Westfield (1861)
- USS Westford (ID-3198)
- USS Westmoreland (APR-11, APA-104)
- USS Westover (ID-2687)
- USS Westpool (ID-3675)
- USS Westport (ID-2362, ID-3548)
- USS Westward Ho (ID-3098)
- USS Westwind (WAG-281/AGB-6/WAGB-281, T-AGSE-2)
- USS Wexford (AK-220)
- USS Wexford County (LST-1168)

=== Wh ===
- USS Whale (SS-239, SSN-638)
- USS Wharton (AP-7)
- USS Wheatear (AM-390/MSF-390)
- USS Wheatland (AKA-85)
- USS Wheeling (PG-14/IX-28, T-AGM-8)
- USS Whetstone (LSD-27)
- USS Whidbey (AG-141)
- USS Whidbey Island (LSD-41)
- USS Whippet (SP-89, IX-129)
- USS Whipple (DD-15, DD-217/AG-117, DE-1062/FF-1062)
- USS Whippoorwill (AM-35/AT-169/ATO-169, AMS-207/MSC-207)
- USS Whipstock (YO-49)
- USS Whirlwind (SP-221, PC-11)
- USS Whistler (SP-784)
- USS Whitaker (DE-571)
- USS White Marsh (APM-8/LSD-8/T-LSD-8)
- USS White Plains (ACV-66/CVE-66/CVU-66, AFS-4)
- USS White River (LSM(R)-536/LFR-536)
- USS White Sands (ARD-20/AGDS-1)
- USS Whitecap (SP-340)
- USS Whitefish (SS-432)
- USS Whitehall (1850, PCE-856/PCE(R)-856)
- USS Whitehead (1861)
- USS Whitehurst (DE-634)
- USS Whiteside (AKA-90)
- USS Whitewood (YN-84/AN-63/AG-129)
- USS Whitfield (AKA-111)
- USS Whitfield County (LST-1169)
- USS Whiting (SS-433)
- USS Whitley (AKA-91)
- USS Whitman (DE-24)
- USS Whitney (AD-4)

=== Wi ===
- USS Wichita (CA-45, AOR-1, LCS-13)
- USS Wickakee (YTB-529)
- USS Wickes (DD-75, DD-578)
- USS Wico (1888)
- USS Wicomico (YT-26)
- USS Widgeon (AM-22/ASR-1, AMS-208/MSC-208)
- USS Wieldrecht (ID-2519)
- USS Wieringen (ID-2547)
- USS Wilbert A. Edwards (SP-315)
- USS Wild Cat (1822, 1862, SP-879)
- USS Wild Goose (SP-562)
- USS Wild Goose II (SP-891)
- USS Wildcat (IX-130/AW-2)
- USS Wilderness (1864)
- USS Wildwood (PC-1181)
- USS Wileman (DE-22)
- USS Wiley (DD-597)
- USS Wilhelmina (ID-2168)
- USS Wilhoite (DE-397/DER-397)
- USS Wilkes (TB-35, DD-67, DD-441, T-AGS-33)
- USS Wilkes-Barre (CL-90, CL-103)
- USS Wilkinson (DD-930/DL-5)
- USS Will Rogers (SSBN-659)
- USS Willamette (1865, AO-180)
- USS Willapa (AVG-53/ACV-53/CVE-53)
- USS Willapa Bay (CVE-109)
- USS Willard A. Holbrook (AP-44)
- USS Willard Keith (DD-775, DE-754)
- USS Willet (AM-54/ARS-12)
- USS Willet Rowe (1863)
- USS William A. McKenney (1916)
- USS William Ashton (1918)
- USS William B. Preston (DD-344/AVP-20/AVD-7)
- USS William Bacon (1863)
- USS William Badger (1861)
- USS William C. Cole (DE-641)
- USS William C. Lawe (DD-763, DE-313, DE-373)
- USS William C. Miller (DE-259)
- USS William Caldwell (1918)
- USS William Charette (DDG-130)
- USS William D. Porter (DD-579)
- USS William Darnold (1918)
- USS William F. McCauley (SP-2360)
- USS William G. Anderson (1859)
- USS William G. Fargo (1863)
- USS William G. Putnam (1857)
- USS William G. Thomas (DE-193)
- USS William H. Ashley (YAG-53)
- USS William H. Bates (SSN-680)
- USS William H. Brown (1862)
- USS William H. Standley (DLG-32/CG-32)
- USS William Isom (ID-1555)
- USS William J. Clinton (CVN-82)
- USS William J. Pattison (DE-594/APD-104)
- USS William Johnson (1918)
- USS William Jones (DD-308)
- USS William Keith (DE-314)
- USS William L. Jones (1861)
- USS William Lee (1836)
- USS William M. Hobby (DE-236/APD-95)
- USS William M. Wood (DE-287, DE-557, DD-715/DDR-715)
- USNS William McLean (T-AKE-12)
- USS William N. Page (1918)
- USS William P. Biddle (AP-15/APA-8)
- USS William P. Lawrence (DDG-110)
- USS William R. Rush (DE-288, DE-556, DD-714/DDR-714)
- USS William Rockefeller (1916)
- USS William Seiverling (DE-441)
- USS William T. Powell (DE-213/DER-213)
- USS William V. Pratt (DLG-13/DDG-44)
- USS William Ward Burrows (AP-6)
- USS Williams (SP-498, DD-108, DE-290, DE-372)
- USS Williamsburg (PG-56/AGC-369)
- USS Williamson (DD-244/AVP-15/AVD-2/APD-27)
- USS Willimantic (ID-3549)
- USS Willing (ARS-49)
- USS Willis (DE-395)
- USS Willis A. Lee (DD-929/DL-4)
- USS Willmarth (DE-638)
- USS Willoughby (SP-2129, AVP-57/AGP-9)
- USCGC Willow (WAGL-332/WLB-332)
- USS Willowherb (PG-100)
- USS Wilmer (1808)
- USS Wilmette (1903)
- USS Wilmington (PG-8, CL-79, CL-111)
- USS Wilrose II (SP-195)
- USS Wilson (DD-408)
- USS Wiltsie (DD-716)
- USS Wimbee (IX-88)
- USS Winamac (YTB-394)
- USS Winchester (SP-156)
- USS Winder (PCS-1376)
- USS Windham Bay (CVE-92/CVU-92)
- USS Windham County (LST-1170)
- USS Windhover (ASR-18)
- USS Windigo (YTB-421/YTM-421)
- USS Winding Gulf (1918)
- USS Windlass (ARS(D)-4/YMLC-4)
- USS Windom (1896)
- USS Windsor (AP-100/APA-55, ARD-22)
- USS Winfield S. Cahill (SP-493)
- USS Winged Arrow (AP-170)
- USS Wingfield (DE-194)
- USS Wingina (YT-395/YTB-395/YTM-395)
- USS Winifred (1898)
- USS Winjah (ACV-54/CVE-54)
- USS Winjah Bay (CVE-110)
- USS Winnebago (1863, 1900)
- USS Winnemucca (PC-1145, YTB-785)
- USS Winnetka (YTB-376)
- USS Winnipec (1864)
- USS Winona (1861)
- USS Winooski (1863, AO-38)
- USS Winslow (TB-5, DD-53, DD-359/AG-127)
- USS Winston (AKA-94/LKA-94)
- USS Winston S. Churchill (DDG-81)
- USS Winterberry (YN-75/AN-56)
- USS Winterswijk (1914)
- USS Winthrop (SP-3297)
- USS Wintle (DE-25, DE-266)
- USS Wisconsin (BB-9, BB-64, SSBN-827)
- USS Wiseman (DE-667)
- USS Wissahickon (1861, SP-852)
- USS Wissoe II (SP-153)
- USS Wistaria (SP-259)
- USS Witek (DD-848)
- USS Witter (DE-636/APD-58)
- USS Wiwoka (SP-250)

=== Wo ===
- USS Woban (YT-138/YTB-138/YTM-138)
- USS Wolffish (SS-434)
- USS Wolverine (IX-31, IX-64)
- USS Wompatuck (YT-27)
- USS Wood (DD-317, AP-101/APA-56)
- USS Wood County (LST-1178)
- USS Woodbine (1913)
- USS Woodbury (1837, 1864, DD-309, WSC-155)
- USS Woodcliff Bay (CVE-93)
- USS Woodcock (AM-14/AT-145/ATO-145)
- USS Woodford (AKA-86)
- USS Woodpecker (AMS-209/MSC-209)
- USS Woodrow R. Thompson (DE-451, DD-721)
- USS Woodrow Wilson (SSBN-624)
- USS Woodson (DE-359)
- USS Woodstock (PC-1180)
- USS Woodworth (DD-460)
- USS Woolsey (DD-77, DD-437)
- USS Woonsocket (PG-140/PF-32, YTM-754)
- USS Worcester (1866, PG-170/PF-62, CL-144)
- USS Worden (TB-16, DD-16, DD-288, DD-352, DLG-18/CG-18)
- USS Worland (PCE-845/PCE(R)-845)
- USS Worthington (PCC-1137)
- USNS Worthy (T-AGOS-14)
- USS Wovoka (YT-396/YTB-396/YTM-396)
- USS Woyot (YT-150/YTB-150/YTM-150)

=== Wr ===
- USS Wrangell (AE-12)
- USS Wren (DD-568)
- USS Wright (AZ-1/AV-1, CVL-49/AVT-7/CC-2, CV-47, T-AVB-3)

=== Wy ===
- USS Wyalusing (1863)
- USS Wyandance (SP-359)
- USS Wyandank (1847)
- USS Wyandot (AKA-92/T-AKA-92/T-AK-283)
- USS Wyandotte (1853, 1864)
- USS Wyffels (DE-6)
- USS Wyman (DE-38, T-AGS-34)
- USS Wyoming (1859, BM-10, BB-32/AG-17, SSBN-742)
- USS Wythe (LST-575/LST(M)-575/APB-41)

== X ==
- USS X-1 (SSX-1)
- USS Xanthus (AR-19)
- USS Xarifa (SP-581)
- USS Xenia (AKA-51)

== Y ==
- USS Yacal (YFB-688)
- USS Yacona (SP-617, AOG-45)
- USS Yahara (AOG-37)
- USS Yakutat (AVP-32/WAVP-380/WHEC-380)
- USS Yale (1889, 1906)
- USS Yamacraw (WARC-333/ARC-5/WAGL-333/WLB-333)
- USS Yanaba (YTB-547/YTM-547)
- USS Yancey (AKA-93/LKA-93)
- USS Yanegua (YTB-397)
- USS Yank (SP-908)
- USS Yankee (1861, 1892)
- USS Yankton (1893)
- USNS Yano (T-AKR-297)
- USS Yantic (IX-32)
- USS Yapashi (YTB-531)
- USS Yaqui (AT-80)
- USS Yaquima (YT-171/YTB-171)
- USS Yarborough (DD-314)
- USS Yarnall (DD-143, DD-541)
- USS Yarrow (SP-1010)
- USS Yatanocas (YTB-544/YTM-544)
- USS Yaupon (YN-96/AN-72/ATA-218)
- USS Yavapai (LST-676/LST(M)-676/APB-42)
- USS Yazoo (1865, YN-121/AN-92)
- USCGC Yeaton (WPC-156)
- USS Yellowstone (ID-2657, AD-27, AD-41)
- USS Yew (YN-32/AN-37)
- USS Yo Ho (SP-463)
- USS Yokes (DE-668/APD-69)
- USS Yolo (LST-677/LST(M)-677/APB-43)
- USS Yonaguska (YT-195/YTB-195/YTM-195)
- USS York (CL-1)
- USS York County (LST-1175)
- USS Yorktown (1839, PG-1, CV-5, CV-10, DDG-48/CG-48)
- USS Yosemite (1892, 1894, CM-2, AD-19)
- USS Young (DD-312, DD-580)
- USS Young America (1855)
- USS Young Rover (1861)
- USS Youngstown (CL-94)
- USS Yourasovski (1899)
- USS Yucca (1864, AT-32, IX-214)
- USS Yukon (AF-9, T-AO-152/T-AOT-152, T-AO-202)
- USS Yuma (1865, YT-37, AT-79, AT-94/ATF-94, YTM-748, T-JHSV-8/T-EPF-8)
- USS Yurok (AT-164/ATF-164)
- USS Yustaga (AT-165/ATF-165)

== Z ==
- USS Zaanland (1918)
- USS Zaca (1918, IX-73)
- USS Zafiro (1884)
- USS Zahma (IX-63)
- USS Zane (DD-337/DMS-14/AG-109)
- USS Zaniah (AK-120/AG-70)
- USS Zanzibar (PF-92)
- USS Zara (SP-133)
- USS Zaurak (AK-117)
- USS Zeal (AM-131/MSF-131)
- USS Zebra (IX-107/AKN-5)
- USS Zeelandia (ID-2507)
- USS Zeilin (DD-313, AP-9/APA-3)
- USS Zelima (AF-49)
- USS Zellars (DD-777)
- USS Zenda (SP-688)
- USS Zenith (SP-61)
- USS Zenobia (AKA-52)
- USS Zephyr (PC-8/WPC-8)
- USS Zeppelin (1914)
- USS Zeta (1844)
- USS Zeus (ARB-4, T-ARC-7)
- USS Zigzag (SP-106)
- USS Zillah (SP-2804)
- USS Zipalong (SP-3)
- USS Zircon (PY-16)
- USS Zirkel (1918)
- USS Zita (SP-21)
- USS Zizania (1888)
- USS Zoraya (SP-235)
- USS Zouave (1861)
- USS Zrinyi (1910)
- USS Zuiderdijk (1912)
- USS Zumbrota (YP-93)
- USS Zumwalt (DDG-1000)
- USS Zuni (AT-95/ATF-95)
