= Wapakoneta =

Wapakoneta may refer to:

== Places ==
- Wapakoneta, Ohio
- The Lima-Van Wert-Wapakoneta, Ohio Combined Statistical Area

== Ships ==
- USS Wapakoneta, United States Navy ships

== Other ==
- The Treaty of Wapakoneta
- The Wapakoneta City School District of Wapakoneta, Ohio
