= List of ships named Wahpeton =

Tug ship name

Wahpeton may refer to the following ships of the United States Navy:

- Wahpeton (YTM-527), a United States Navy tug in service from 1946, reclassified YTM-527 in 1962, and stricken in 1985
- Wahpeton (YTM-757), a United States Navy tug acquired in 1968 and sold in 1974
