= USS Whippet =

USS Whippet has been the name of more than one United States Navy ship, and may refer to:

- USS Whippet (SP-89), a patrol boat in commission from 1917 to 1919
- USS Whippet (IX-129), a tanker in commission from 1944 to 1946
