= USS Yucca =

USS Yucca has been the name of three ships in the United States Navy:

- The first USS Yucca (1864) was a wooden hulled steamer, built near the end of the American Civil War and in commission from 1865 to 1868.
- USS Yucca (AT-32), a tugboat, was renamed USS Napa (AT-32) before her keel was laid in 1919.
- The second USS Yucca (IX-214), formerly named SS Utacarbon, was a tanker in commission from 1945 to 1946.
