= USS Willoughby =

USS Willoughby has been the name of more than one United States Navy ship, and may refer to:

- USS Willoughby (SP-2129), a patrol vessel in commission from 1918 to 1919
- USS Willoughby (AVP-57), a seaplane tender laid down in 1943 but converted into the motor torpedo tender USS Willoughby prior to completion
- USS Willoughby (AGP-9), a motor torpedo boat tender in commission from 1944 to 1946
