= USS Zeus =

USS Zeus has been the name of more than one United States Navy ship, and may refer to:

- USS Zeus (ARB-4) (formerly LST-132), a Aristaeus-class repair ship, commissioned 1944 and struck 1973, currently in service as Gordon Jensen, a seafood processing ship.
- USNS Zeus (T-ARC-7), a cable repair ship operated by the Military Sealift Command, delivered in 1984.
