= USS Watseka =

Tugboat of the United States Navy

History

United States
- Name: USS Watseka
- Acquired: by purchase, 1943
- Decommissioned: March 1946
- Reclassified: YTM-387, 15 May 1944
- Fate: Sold, 1 July 1972

General characteristics
- Type: Tugboat
- Length: 100 ft (30 m)
- Beam: 25 ft (7.6 m)
- Draft: 10 ft (3.0 m)

USS Watseka (YTM-387) was a medium harbor tug of the YTM-192 class in the service of the United States Navy during World War II. The Naval Historical Center lists the namesake as: "Possibly a variant spelling of Watsaghika, a former village of the Iruwaitsu Shasta Indian tribe of northern California, at the extreme west end of Scott Valley."

Watseka was purchased in 1943 from Ira S. Bushey and Sons of Brooklyn, New York, and assigned to the 8th Naval District, New Orleans, Louisiana, as YT-387. On 15 May 1944, her designation was changed from YT-387 to YTB-387. While in reserve, she was redesignated YTM-387 in February 1962.

Placed in reserve, out of service, and berthed with the Columbia River, Oregon, group of the Pacific Reserve Fleet from March 1946, she was subsequently sold on 1 July 1972. As a civilian tug, she operated under the names Deborah W, Beaver, Seahorse, SB IX, Seahorse, and Glen Cove.
