= USS Walter Adams =

Patrol vessel of the United States Navy

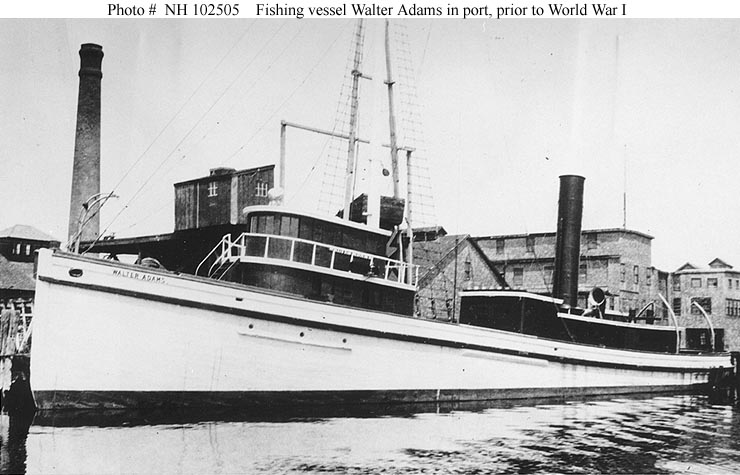
- Fishing trawler SS Walter Adams prior to her World War I service as USS Walter Adams (SP-400)

History

United States
- Name: USS Walter Adams
- Namesake: Previous name retained
- Builder: Robert Palmer and Son, Noank, Connecticut
- Completed: 1890
- Acquired: 23 June 1918
- Commissioned: 1 October 1918
- Decommissioned: 10 January 1919
- Stricken: 10 January 1919
- Fate: Returned to owners 10 January 1919
- Notes: Operated as private fishing trawler SS Walter Adams 1890-1918 and from 1919

General characteristics
- Type: Patrol vessel
- Tonnage: 271 Gross register tons
- Length: 137 ft 0 in (41.76 m)
- Beam: 24 ft 3 in (7.39 m)
- Draft: 8 ft 6 in (2.59 m) mean
- Speed: 10.5 knots
- Complement: 27
- Armament: none

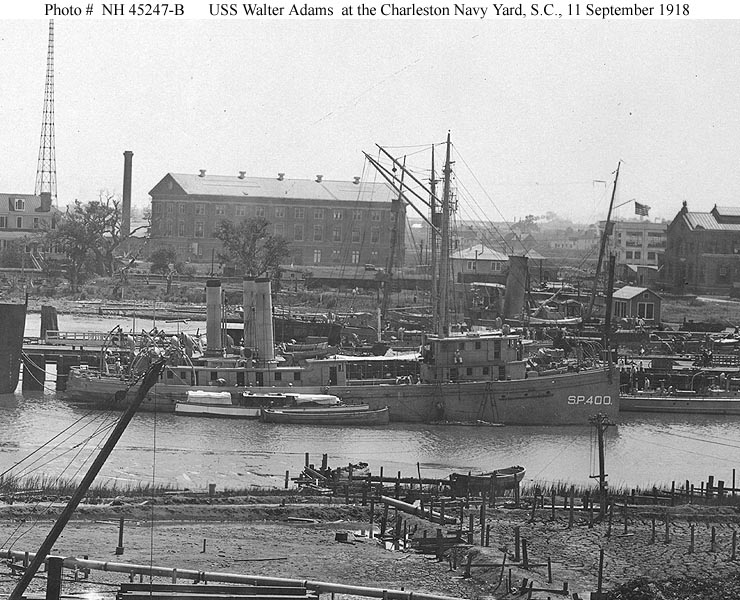
Walter Adams fitting out at Charleston Navy Yard, Charleston, South Carolina, on 11 September 1918, 20 days before commissioning.

USS Walter Adams (SP-400), or ID-400, was a United States Navy patrol vessel in commission from 1918 to 1919.

SS Walter Adams was a wooden-hulled steam fishing trawler built in 1890 by Robert Palmer and Son, of Noank, Connecticut, and rebuilt in 1898. The U.S. Navy inspected her for possible naval service in March 1917 and again in June 1918, and chartered her on 23 June 1918 for World War I service in the 6th Naval District. She was commissioned on 1 October 1918 as USS Walter Adams. Photographs show that she had the designation "SP-400" painted on her bow and she was used as a patrol boat like other units with an "SP" designation during World War I, although her data card lists her as having Identification Number (Id. No.) 400, or "ID-400", the type of designation given to cargo ships, tankers, and transports taken up from civilian service for use during World War I.

Walter Adams operated locally out of Charleston, South Carolina, through the end of World War I. There are no records indicating exactly what she did during her operational career, but it appears likely that she conducted practice minesweeping operations.

Walter Adams was decommissioned at the Customs House Dock at Wilmington, North Carolina, on 10 January 1919, struck from the Navy List the same day, and simultaneously returned to her owner.
