= USS Wego =

Patrol vessel of the United States Navy

History

United States
- Name: USS Wego, We-go, or We Go
- Namesake: Previous name retained
- Builder: Camden Anchor Rockland Machine Company, Camden, Maine
- Acquired: By 9 August 1917
- Commissioned: By 9 August 1917
- Fate: Returned to owner 1 October 1918
- Notes: Operated as private motorboat Wego, We-go, or We Go until 1917 and from 1918

General characteristics
- Type: Patrol vessel
- Length: 34 ft 5 in (10.49 m)
- Beam: 9 ft 0 in (2.74 m)
- Draft: 2 ft 9 in (0.84 m) aft
- Speed: 10.0 knots
- Complement: 4
- Armament: 1 × machine gun

USS Wego (SP-1196), also spelled We-go and We Go, was a United States Navy patrol vessel in commission from 1917 to 1918.

Wego was built as a private wooden-hulled motorboat of the same name by the Camden Anchor Rockland Machine Company at Camden, Maine. In 1917, the U.S. Navy acquired her under a free lease from her owner, Mrs. R. B. Fuller of New York City, for use as a section patrol boat during World War I. Wego was listed as "delivered and commissioned" as of 9 August 1917 as USS Wego, We-go, or We Go (SP-1196).

Apparently assigned to the 1st Naval District in northern New England, Wego served on local patrol duties. She was returned to her owner on 1 October 1918.
