= USS Whippoorwill =

USS Whippoorwill is a name that has been used more than once by the U.S. Navy in naming its ships. The name derives from that of the eastern whip-poor-will.

- USS Whippoorwill (AM-35) laid down on 12 December 1917 at Mobile, Alabama.
- USS Whippoorwill (AMS-207) laid down on 7 January 1954 at Bellingham, Washington.
