= USS Yazoo =

USS Yazoo is a name used more than once by the United States Navy:

- USS Yazoo (1865), an American Civil War monitor.
- USS Yazoo (AN-92), a World War II net laying ship.
