= USS Warbler =

USS Warbler is a name the United States Navy has used more than once in naming its ships:

- USS Warbler (AM-53), laid down on 24 April 1919 by the Philadelphia Navy Yard.
- USS Warbler (MSC-206), laid down on 15 October 1953 at Bellingham, Washington.
