= USS William H. Brown =

Gunboat of the United States Navy

History

United States
- Acquired: 30 September 1862
- In service: circa 30 September 1862
- Out of service: 12 August 1865
- Fate: Sold, 17 August 1865

General characteristics
- Displacement: 800 tons
- Propulsion: steam engine; side wheel-propelled
- Armament: two 12-pounder guns

USS William H. Brown was a steamer acquired by the Union Navy during the American Civil War. She was used by the Union Navy as a dispatch and supply boat in support of the Union Navy blockade of Confederate waterways.

== Service history ==
On 30 September 1862, William H. Brown, a stern-wheel steamer of 200 tons built at Monongahela, PA, 1860, was transferred to the Navy by the U.S. War Department; and she served as a transport and dispatch vessel for the Mississippi Squadron for the duration of the Civil War. The ship carried supplies and messages between the squadron's base at Cairo, Illinois, and its ships at various locations on the Mississippi River and its tributaries.

Her only recorded engagement came on 13 April 1864 during the Red River expedition when she fired on Confederate shore batteries while assisting the grounded gunboat Chillicothe. Confederate return fire hit her drum and disabled her so that she had to be towed back to Cairo for repairs. After hostilities ended, the ship was placed out of commission at Mound City, Illinois, on 12 August 1865. Five days later, she was sold at auction to Mr. R. R. Hudson.
