= USS Zigzag =

Patrol vessel of the United States Navy

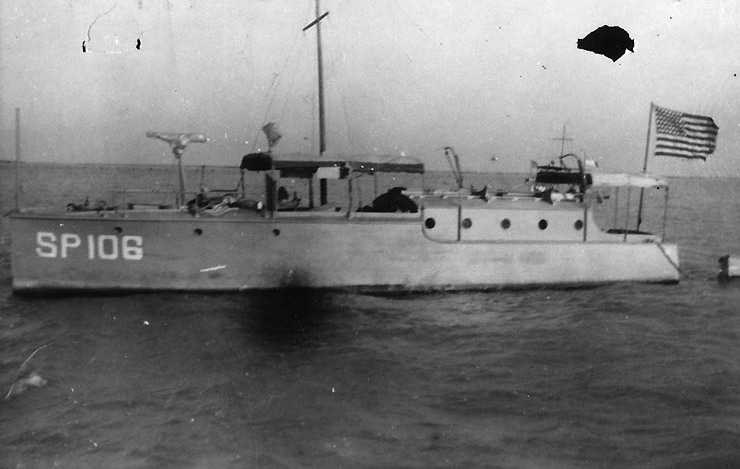
- USS Zigzag (SP-106) during World War I

History

United States
- Name: USS Zigzag
- Namesake: Previous name retained
- Builder: A. E. Luders Construction Company, Stamford, Connecticut
- Completed: May 1916
- Acquired: 27 June 1917
- Commissioned: 8 August 1917
- Stricken: 4 October 1919
- Fate: Wrecked 9 September 1919
- Notes: Operated as private motorboat Zigzag 1916-1917

General characteristics
- Type: Patrol vessel
- Length: 44 ft 0 in (13.41 m)
- Beam: 8 ft 6 in (2.59 m)
- Draft: 2 ft 10 in (0.86 m) mean
- Speed: 21 knots (39 km/h)
- Armament: 1 × .30-caliber (7.62-mm) machine gun

USS Zigzag (SP-106) was an armed motorboat that served in the United States Navy as a patrol vessel from 1917 to 1919.

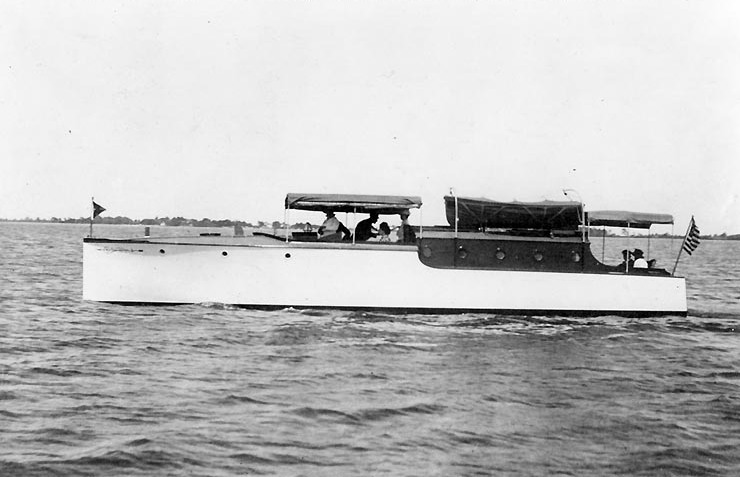
Zigzag in Florida waters as a private motorboat in 1916-1917 prior to her U.S. Navy service.

Zigzag was a wooden-hulled motorboat completed in May 1916 by the A. E. Luders Construction Company of Stamford, Connecticut. She was acquired by the U.S. Navy from T. J. Backman of Bradenton, Florida, for service in World War I, and was delivered to the navy on 27 June 1917. Assigned the classification SP-106, USS Zigzag was placed in commission on 8 August 1917.

Assigned to the 7th Naval District, Zigzag operated on local section patrol duties for the duration of World War I and probably until the cessation of all defensive patrols on 24 November 1918.

Zigzag subsequently was anchored in the North Beach Basin, Key West, Florida, awaiting disposition, when a hurricane battered the Florida Keys on 9 September 1919 and swept through the yacht basin. On 10 September 1919, eight section patrol (SP) boats, including Zigzag, were found dashed to pieces on the seawall. Salvage crews later hauled the tangled wreckage from the water and burned it, retaining only the machinery to survey for future disposal.

Zigzag was struck from the Navy List on 4 October 1919.
