= USS Whirlwind =

USS Whirlwind has been the name of more than one United States Navy ship, and may refer to:

- USS Whirlwind (SP-221), a patrol vessel in commission in 1917 and again in 1918
- USS Whirlwind (PC-11), a patrol craft in commission since 1995
