= USS Woodrow R. Thompson =

USS Woodrow R. Thompson has been the name of more than one United States Navy ship, and may refer to:

- USS Woodrow R. Thompson (DE-451), a destroyer escort scheduled for construction during World War II but cancelled on 6 June 1944
- USS Woodrow R. Thompson (DD-721), a destroyer launched in 1946 but never completed
