= USS Wailaki =

Tugboat of the United States Navy

History

United States
- Name: USS Wailaki
- Namesake: The Wailaki, one of the Native American groups making up the Eel River Athapaskans that traditionally lived on or near the Eel River of northwestern California
- Builder: Bethlehem Steel Company, San Pedro, California (planned)
- Laid down: Never
- Notes: Construction contract cancelled 29 August 1945

General characteristics
- Class & type: Hisada-class tug
- Displacement: 310 tons (full)
- Length: 101 ft 0 in (30.78 m)
- Beam: 28 ft 0 in (8.53 m)
- Draft: 9 ft 7 in (2.92 m)
- Speed: 12 knots
- Complement: 10

USS Wailaki (YTB-706) was a large yard tug proposed for the United States Navy that was not built.

Wailaki was a Hisada-class large yard tug slated to be built at Terminal Island, San Pedro, California, by the Bethlehem Steel Company, but the contract for her construction was cancelled on 29 August 1945.
