= USS W. F. Marty =

Patrol vessel of the United States Navy

History

United States
- Name: USS W. F. Marty
- Namesake: The boat's private owner (previous name retained)
- Completed: 1917
- Acquired: "Delivered" 6 October 1917; "enrolled" on 16 October 1917
- Commissioned: Unknown
- Stricken: 5 February 1918
- Fate: Returned to owner 28 January 1918

General characteristics
- Type: Patrol vessel
- Length: 40 ft (12 m)
- Beam: 10 ft (3.0 m)
- Draft: 3 ft (0.91 m)
- Speed: 11 knots
- Armament: none

USS W. F. Marty (ID-1239) was a patrol vessel that served in the United States Navy from 1917 to 1918. A wooden-hulled motorboat, she was built as the W. F. Marty in 1917 for W. F. Marty of Olney, Pennsylvania. She was inspected by the U.S. Navy, in the 4th Naval District in 1917 for possible use as a section patrol vessel. She was assigned the classification SP-1145.

Little is known, however, of any actual Navy service. Listed by the Navy as "delivered" on 6 October 1917 and "enrolled" on 16 October 1917, She was subsequently returned to her owner on 28 January 1918 and struck from the Navy List on 5 February 1918, indicating that her Navy service, if any, was of short duration. There are no records to indicate whether or not the boat was ever placed in commission. Her eventual fate is also unrecorded.
