= USS Wemootah =

Patrol vessel of the United States Navy

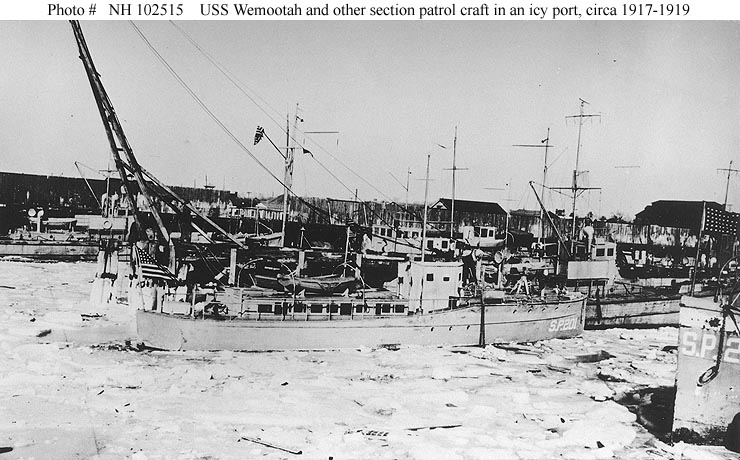
- USS Wemootah in an [icy port with several other section patrol craft sometime between 1917 and 1919, probably in the New York Harbor area.

History

United States
- Name: USS Wemootah
- Namesake: Previous name retained
- Builder: Gas Engine and Power Company and Charles L. Seabury Company, Morris Heights, the Bronx, New York
- Completed: 1916
- Acquired: 16 June 1917
- Commissioned: 7 July 1917
- Stricken: 13 June 1919
- Fate: Sold 10 October 1919
- Notes: Operated as civilian motorboat Wemootah 1916-1917

General characteristics
- Type: Patrol vessel and net tender
- Displacement: 20.58 tons
- Length: 70 ft (21 m)
- Beam: 13 ft (4.0 m)
- Draft: 4 ft 3 in (1.30 m) aft
- Speed: 13 miles per hour
- Complement: 13
- Armament: 1 × 3-pounder gun; 2 × machine guns

USS Wemootah (SP-201) was a United States Navy patrol vessel and net tender in commission from 1917 to 1919.

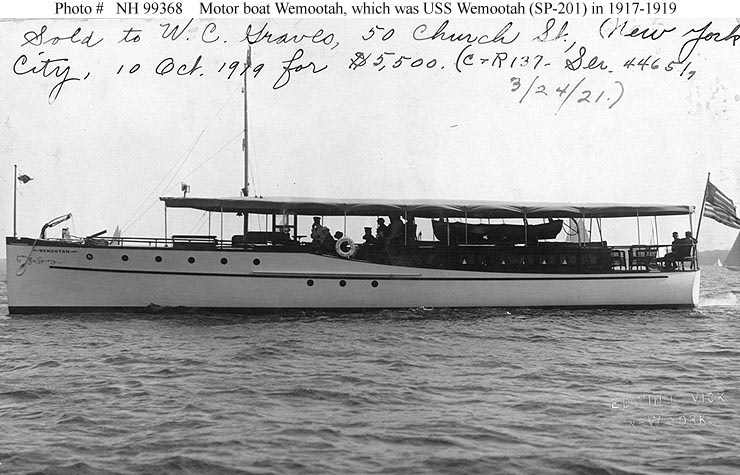
Wemootah as a civilian motorboat sometime in 1916 or 1917, prior to her U.S. Navy service.

Wemootah was built as a civilian motorboat of the same name in 1913 by the Gas Engine and Power Company and the Charles L. Seabury Company at Morris Heights in the Bronx, New York. The U.S. Navy purchased her from her owner, A. Gardner Cooper of New York City, on 16 June 1917 for World War I service as a patrol vessel. She was commissioned as USS Wemootah (SP-201) on 7 July 1917.

Operating from the Rosebank Section Base on Staten Island, New York, Wemootah served in New York Harbor as a patrol craft and net tender through the end of World War I.

Wemootah was disarmed in January 1919 and put up for sale. Her name was stricken from the Navy Directory on 13 June 1919, and she was sold to Mr. W. O. Graves of New York City on 10 October 1919.
