= USS Wimbee =

History

United States
- Name: USS Wimbee
- Launched: 1938, as Condor
- Acquired: August 1942
- In service: 11 September 1942
- Out of service: 17 March 1943
- Renamed: Wimbee, 11 September 1942
- Stricken: 28 June 1944
- Fate: Sold, 7 February 1945

General characteristics
- Type: Yawl
- Displacement: 22 long tons (22 t)
- Length: 59 ft 9 in (18.21 m)
- Beam: 13 ft 3 in (4.04 m)
- Draft: 8 ft 2 in (2.49 m)
- Propulsion: Sail with auxiliary engine
- Speed: 7 knots (13 km/h; 8.1 mph)

USS Wimbee (IX-88) was an auxiliary yawl of the United States Navy during World War II. Built in 1938 at Bremen, Germany as Condor, the yacht was acquired by the US Navy from Mr. W. L. MacFarland of Greenwich, Connecticut, in August 1942.

Wimbee served in what Samuel Eliot Morison has called the "Hooligan Navy," a motley assortment of sailing ships and pleasure craft assembled by the Navy to combat the U-boat menace before America's huge antisubmarine warship production program hit full gear. She was renamed Wimbee and was placed in service at Port Everglades, Florida, on 11 September 1942.

== Service history ==
Assigned to the 7th Naval District, Wimbee served only five months in the Navy, for the most part conducting anti-submarine patrols in the Gulf of Mexico. On 17 March 1943, she was placed out of service. Struck from the Navy List on 28 June 1944, she was transferred to the Maritime Commission and sold on 7 February 1945 to Mr. Paul Liskey of Harrisonburg, Virginia.
