= USS Weeks =

USS Weeks may refer to more than one United States Navy ship:

- USS Weeks (DE-285), a destroyer escort cancelled in 1944
- USS John W. Weeks (DD-701), a destroyer in commission from 1944 to 1970
