= USS Winnemucca =

USS Winnemucca may refer to the following ships operated by the United States Navy:

- USS Winnemucca (PC-1145), was a PC-461 type patrol craft launched in October 1943 and transferred to Korea, 1 November 1960
- Winnemucca (YTB-785), was a Natick-class tugboat that served from December 1965 until December 2003
