= USS Winooski =

USS Winooski is a name used more than once by the United States Navy:

- USS Winooski (1863), a gunboat launched on 30 July 1863 at the Boston Navy Yard.
- USS Winooski (AO-38), an oiler laid down as Calusa on 23 April 1941 at Sparrows Point, Maryland.
