= USS Weiss =

USS Weiss has been the name of more than one United States Navy ship, and may refer to:

- USS Weiss (DE-378), a destroyer escort cancelled during construction in 1944
- USS Weiss (DE-719), a destroyer escort converted during construction into a fast transport
- USS Weiss (APD-135), formerly Weiss (DE-719), a fast transport in commission from 1945 to 1970
