= USS Water Lily =

Patrol vessel of the United States Navy

History

United States
- Name: USS Water Lily
- Namesake: The water lily, an aquatic plant (previous name retained)
- Completed: 1895
- Acquired: April 1917
- Stricken: 1 July 1919
- Fate: Returned to U.S. Department of Commerce 1 July 1919
- Notes: Served in United States Lighthouse Service 1895-1917 and from 1919

General characteristics
- Type: Morot launch
- Displacement: 29 tons
- Length: 61 ft 0 in (18.59 m)
- Beam: 11 ft 0 in (3.35 m)
- Draft: 2 ft 11 in (0.89 m)
- Speed: 9 knots
- Complement: 5

USS Water Lily was a motor launch that served in the United States Navy from 1917 to 1919.

Water Lily was constructed for the United States Lighthouse Service in 1895 at Morris Heights, New York. She was transferred to the U.S. Navy in April 1917 for World War I service along with the entire Lighthouse Service.

Water Lily operated in the 6th Naval District through the end of hostilities and for several months thereafter. She resumed her prewar duties on 1 July 1919 when the Navy returned control of the Lighthouse Service to the Department of Commerce.
