= USS Willamette =

USS Willamette has been the name of more than one United States Navy ship, and may refer to:

- USS Willamette (1865), a sloop-of-war or frigate cancelled in 1866 before her keel was laid
- USS Willamette (AO-180), a fleet replenishment oiler in commission from 1982 to 1999
