= USS Wild Goose =

USS Wild Goose and USS Wild Goose II have been the name of more than one United States Navy ship, and may refer to:

- USS Wild Goose (SP-562), a patrol vessel in commission from 1917 to 1920
- USS Wild Goose II (SP-891), later USS SP-891, a patrol vessel in commission from 1917 to 1919 or 1920
