= USS Wathena =

USS Wathena has been the name of more than one United States Navy ship, and may refer to:

- USS Wathena (ID-3884), a cargo ship in commission in 1919.
- Wathena (YTB-825), a large harbor tug placed in service in 1973 and stricken from the Naval Register in 1997
