= USS Zillah =

Patrol vessel of the United States Navy

History

United States
- Name: USS Zillah
- Namesake: Previous name retained
- Builder: Charles Clarke and Company, Galveston, Texas,
- Completed: 1903
- Acquired: June 1918
- Commissioned: 1918
- Decommissioned: 13 December 1918
- Stricken: 13 December 1918
- Fate: Returned to owners 13 December 1918
- Notes: Operated as private motorboat Zillah 1903-1918 and from December 1918

General characteristics
- Type: Patrol vessel
- Displacement: 16.8 tons
- Length: 58 ft 8 in (17.88 m)
- Beam: 11 ft 8 in (3.56 m)
- Speed: 12 knots

USS Zillah (SP-2804) was a motorboat that served in the United States Navy as a patrol vessel during 1918.

Zillah was a wooden-hulled motorboat built in 1903 by Charles Clarke and Company at Galveston, Texas, and rebuilt in 1913 by the same firm. She was acquired by the U.S. Navy from that same company in June 1918 for service in World War I. Though there is no record of the date on which USS Zillah was commissioned, she was designated SP-2804 and assigned to the 8th Naval District.

Zillah served with the naval port guard at Galveston for the remainder of World War I. She was decommissioned on 13 December 1918. Her name was struck from the Navy Directory on that same day, and she was simultaneously returned to her owner.
