= SS West View =

Cargo ship of the United States Navy

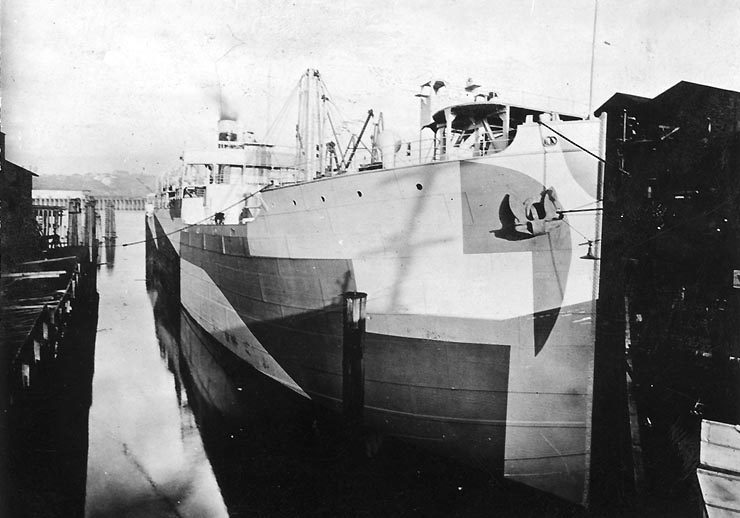
- SS West View in port ca. autumn 1918.

History

United States
- Name: USS West View
- Builder: Northwest Steel Company, Portland, Oregon
- Launched: 26 August 1918
- Completed: 1918
- Acquired: 21 November 1918
- Commissioned: 21 November 1918
- Decommissioned: 20 January 1919
- Stricken: 20 January 1919
- Fate: Transferred to United States Shipping Board 20 January 1919
- Notes: In reserve with U.S. Shipping Board and U.S. Maritime Commission as SS West View 1919-ca. 1938; Scrapped ca. 1938

General characteristics
- Tonnage: 5,808 GRT
- Length: 428 ft (130 m)
- Beam: 54 ft (16 m)
- Draft: 24 ft 6 in (7.47 m)
- Depth: 29 ft 9 in (9.07 m)
- Propulsion: Steam engine
- Speed: 10 knots
- Complement: 82
- Armament: None

USS West View, also spelled Westview, was a cargo ship that served in the United States Navy from 1918 to 1919.

SS West View was built in 1918 as a commercial cargo ship at Portland, Oregon by the Northwest Steel Company for the United States Shipping Board. Although she was never assigned a naval registry identification number, she was delivered to the Navy on 21 November 1918 and commissioned the same day as USS West View at Puget Sound Navy Yard in Bremerton, Washington.

Assigned to the Naval Overseas Transportation Service, West View departed the West Coast of the United States with a cargo of 7,200 tons of flour. Voyaging via the Panama Canal, she arrived at New York City on 12 January 1919.

After this lone voyage, West View was decommissioned at New York City on 20 January 1919 and was transferred to the United States Shipping Board and stricken from the Navy List the same day.

Once again SS West View, she lay in reserve in the James River in Virginia in the custody of the U.S.Shipping Board and its successor, the United States Maritime Commission until ca. 1938, when she probably was scrapped due to age and deterioration.
