= USS Zenith =

Armed motorboat in the United States Navy

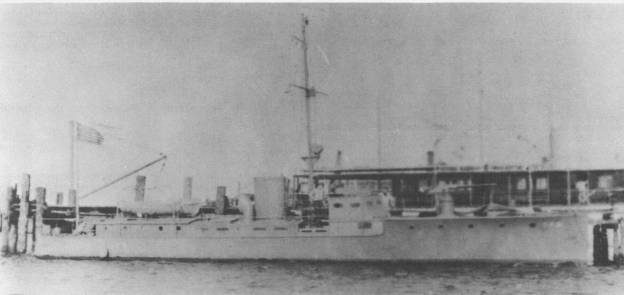
- USS Zenith (SP-61) in 1917 or 1918

History

United States
- Name: USS Zenith
- Namesake: Previous name retained
- Builder: Mathis Yacht Building Company, Camden, New Jersey
- Yard number: 65
- Completed: 1917
- Acquired: 21 April 1917
- Commissioned: 23 April 1917
- Decommissioned: 21 November 1918
- Stricken: 21 November 1918
- Home port: Philadelphia, Pennsylvania
- Identification: ON #214868, Callsign:LGTN
- Fate: Returned to owner 21 November 1918

General characteristics
- Type: Section patrol vessel
- Tonnage: 32 GRT
- Displacement: 19 tons
- Length: 73 ft 3 in (22.33 m)
- Beam: 11 ft 8.5 in (3.569 m)
- Draft: 3 ft 10 in (1.17 m) aft
- Propulsion: 2 X eight cylinder Duesenberg diesels
- Speed: 27 knots
- Complement: 12
- Armament: 1 × rapid-firing 3-pounder gun; 2 × machine guns

USS Zenith (SP-61) was an armed motorboat that served in the United States Navy as a Section patrol vessel from 1917 to 1918.

Zenith was a motorboat or yacht designed by Bowes and Mower, Philadelphia, and built by the Mathis Yacht Building Company in 1917 at Camden, New Jersey for Charles Longstreth of Philadelphia, Commodore of the Corinthian Yacht Club of Philadelphia. The design was approved by naval authorities with the possibility of naval reserve service in mind. Zenith was turned over to naval authorities just before completion. Zenith was the second Longstreth vessel in naval service. The first of the designated S.P. type, USS Arawan II (SP-1), entered naval service 27 March 1917. Longstreth had been commissioned a Lieutenant Commander by the Navy and expected to command Zenith as he had Arawan II.

The boat was powered by two 400-horsepower (300 kW), eight cylinder Duesenberg diesel engines with estimated speed of 30 miles per hour (48 km/h) at maximum 1,200 revolutions per minute. Armament was expected to be one 3-pounder gun forward and two machine guns aft with a complement of nine men.

She was acquired by the U.S. Navy on 21 April 1917 at Philadelphia, Pennsylvania for service as a patrol vessel in World War I. She was designated SP-61 and commissioned as USS Zenith at Philadelphia on 23 April 1917. Assigned to section-patrol duty, Zenith conducted surveillance patrols to protect the harbors and estuaries of the 4th Naval District coastline—Pennsylvania, Delaware, and southern New Jersey—from enemy incursion, primarily against submarine and minelaying operations. She served until hostilities ended on 11 November 1918.

Zenith was decommissioned on 21 November 1918, just 10 days after the armistice. That same day, her name was struck from the Navy list and Zenith was returned to her owner.
