= USS Xarifa =

Patrol vessel of the United States Navy

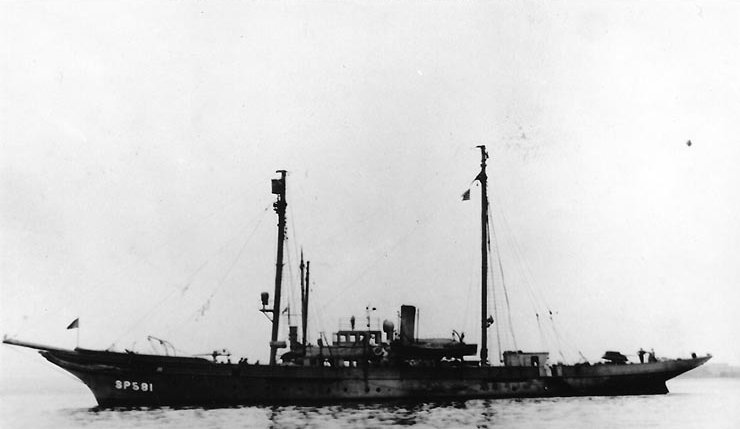
- USS Xarifa in harbor, 1918-1919

History

United States
- Builder: J. Samuel White, Cowes
- Completed: April 1894
- Commissioned: 23 February 1918
- Decommissioned: 31 March 1919
- Fate: returned to owner 4 May 1919

General characteristics
- Tonnage: 145 GRT, 378 NRT
- Length: 192 ft (59 m) overall; 168.2 ft (51.3 m) registered
- Beam: 26.6 ft (8.1 m)
- Depth: 15.45 ft (4.71 m)
- Installed power: 97 NHP
- Propulsion: 1 × compound engine; 1 × screw
- Speed: 11 knots (20 km/h)
- Complement: 71
- Armament: 2 × 3-pounder guns; 2 × machine guns

USS Xarifa (SP-581) was a patrol boat in the United States Navy.

== Career ==
Xarifa was a composite-hulled, sailing yacht with an auxiliary steam engine. She was built in 1894 at Cowes, Isle of Wight, England, by J. Samuel White & Co., Ltd. Apparently completed as Xarifa, she served for a time as Ophelie before she was bought by C. N. Nelson in, or sometime before, 1911. She then resumed the name Xarifa and operated out of Port Washington, Long Island, New York.

After the outbreak of World War I, the United States Navy acquired the yacht on 9 August 1917 for service in European waters and designated her SP-581. However, while the ship was being fitted out, she was found to be unsuitable for "distant service" and was prepared for duty on section patrol.

Assigned to the 3rd Naval District, Xarifa was commissioned at the New York Navy Yard on 23 February 1918 and patrolled the approaches to New York harbor through the armistice. She was decommissioned on 31 March 1919 and returned to her owner on 4 May 1919.
