= USS Waxbill =

USS Waxbill may refer to:

- USS Waxbill (AMc-15), a wooden-hulled purse seiner built in 1936
- USS Waxbill (MHC-50), laid down as PCS-1456 on 28 April 1943
- USS Waxbill (AM-414), which was to be built in 1945, but the contract was canceled.
