= USS Wendy =

Patrol vessel of the United States Navy

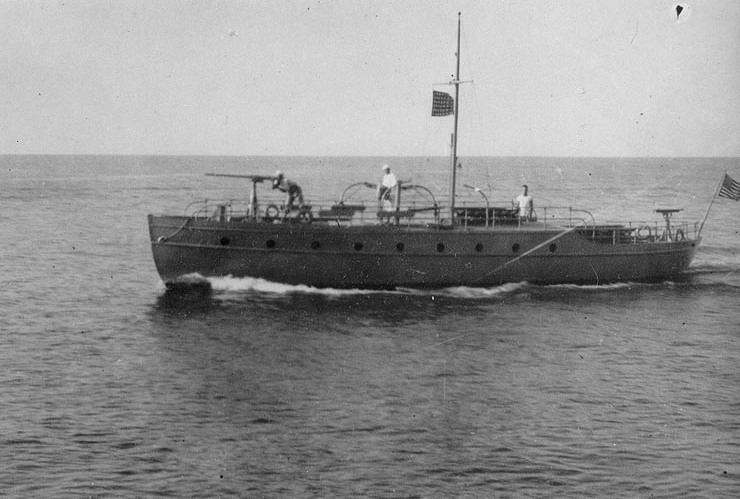
- USS Wendy (SP-448) during World War I with a sailor manning the 1-pounder gun on her bow.

History

United States
- Name: USS Wendy
- Namesake: Previous name retained
- Builder: Jahncke Navigation Company, New Orleans, Louisiana
- Completed: 1913
- Acquired: 1 July 1917
- Commissioned: 3 August 1917
- Decommissioned: 9 December 1918
- Fate: Returned to owner 9 December 1918
- Notes: Operated as private motorboat Wendy 1913-1917 and from 1918

General characteristics
- Type: Patrol vessel
- Tonnage: 24 gross register tons
- Length: 55 ft (17 m)
- Beam: 11 ft 6 in (3.51 m)
- Draft: 3 ft 6 in (1.07 m) aft
- Speed: 9 knots
- Complement: 9
- Armament: 1 × 1-pounder gun; 1 × Colt machine gun

USS Wendy (SP-448) was a United States Navy patrol vessel in commission from 1917 to 1918.

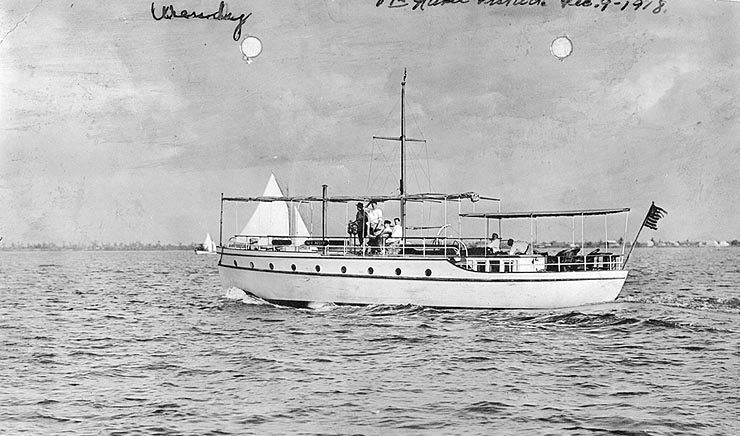
Wendy as a private motorboat sometime between 1913 and 1917.

Wendy was built as a private motorboat of the same name in 1913 by the Jahncke Navigation Company at New Orleans, Louisiana. On 1 July 1917, the U.S. Navy acquired her from her owner, Mr. C. A Sporl of New Orleans, for use as a section patrol vessel during World War I. She was commissioned at New Orleans as USS Wendy (SP-448) on 3 August 1917.

Wendy carried out patrol duties in the waters around New Orleans for the remainder of World War I.

Wendy was decommissioned on 9 December 1918 and returned to Sporl the same day.
