= USS Wando =

USS Wando has been the name of more than one United States Navy ship, and may refer to:

- USS Wando (1864), a steamer in commission as a gunboat from 1864 to 1865
- USS Wando (AT-17), originally Tugboat No. 17, later YT-123, later YTB-123, a tug in commission 1917–1922 and 1933–1946
