= USS Wilrose II =

Patrol vessel of the United States Navy

History

United States
- Name: USS Wilrose II
- Namesake: Previous name retained
- Builder: S. P. Noch, Stamford, Connecticut
- Completed: 1908
- Acquired: 3 May 1918
- In service: 8 May 1918
- Out of service: late 1919 or January 1920
- Stricken: Probably 10 March 1920
- Fate: Sold 10 March 1920
- Notes: Built as civilian motorboat Wilrose II

General characteristics
- Type: Patrol vessel
- Tonnage: 44 Gross register tons
- Length: 75 ft 6 in (23.01 m)
- Beam: 17 ft (5.2 m)
- Draft: 4 ft 3 in (1.30 m) aft
- Speed: 9.5 to 10 knots
- Complement: 5
- Armament: 1 × 3-pounder gun; 3 × machine guns

USS Wilrose II (SP-195) -- also referred to in United States Navy records as USS Wild Rose, USS Wildrose, and USS Wilrose -- was a U.S. Navy patrol vessel in service from 1918 to 1919.

Wilrose II was built as a civilian motorboat of the same name in 1908 by S. P. Noch at Stamford, Connecticut. The U.S. Navy acquired her from her owner, R. H. Meyer of Jacksonville, Florida, on 3 May 1918 at Jacksonville for World War I service as a patrol vessel. She was placed in service as USS Wilrose II (SP-195) on 8 May 1918.

Wilrose II served with the section patrol contingent of the 6th Naval District, which then included the coasts of South Carolina, Georgia, and Florida as far south as the St. Johns River. She was responsible for patrolling along that coastline and its harbors to protect them against enemy attack, primarily against the German submarine menace. She pursued that duty through 11 November 1918, when the armistice with Germany ending World War I made such patrols unnecessary. After the war, she remained in active service in the 6th Naval District at least until the waning months of 1919.

In January 1920, Wilrose II was slated for sale, and she was sold on 10 March 1920 to the Charles Dry Dock and Machine Company of Charleston, South Carolina. Presumably, her name was stricken from the Navy Directory concurrently with the sale.
