= USS Wassuc =

USS Wassuc is the name of a vessel, used more than once by the United States Navy:

- USS Wassuc (1865), a single-turreted, twin-screw monitor—was laid down in June 1863 at Portland, Maine.
- USS Wassuc (CMc-3), originally a steel-hulled, coastal passenger vessel built in 1924 at Elizabethport, New Jersey.
