= USS Whiting =

USS Whiting may refer to more than one United States Navy ship:

- USS Whiting (SS-433), a submarine cancelled in 1944 prior to construction
- USS Kenneth Whiting (AV-14), a seaplane tender in commission from 1944 to 1947 and from 1951 to 1958
