= USS Wiwoka =

Patrol vessel of the United States Navy

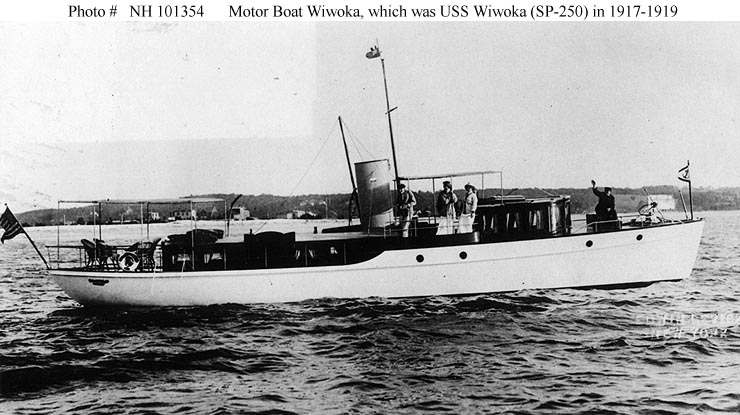
- Wiwoka as a civilian motorboat sometime between 1912 and 1917, prior to her U.S. Navy service as USS Wiwoka.

History

United States
- Name: USS Wiwoka
- Namesake: Previous name retained
- Builder: Murray and Tregurtha, South Boston, Massachusetts
- Completed: 1912
- Acquired: 25 July 1917
- Commissioned: 11 September 1917
- Decommissioned: probably December 1918
- Stricken: 17 January 1919
- Fate: Disarmed 18 December 1918; Returned to owner 17 January 1919
- Notes: Operated as civilian motorboat Idylease III and Wiwoka 1912-1917 and Wiwoka from 1919

General characteristics
- Type: Patrol vessel
- Tonnage: 25 tons
- Length: 62 ft (19 m)
- Beam: 11 ft 6 in (3.51 m)
- Draft: 4 ft (1.2 m) aft
- Speed: 10 knots
- Complement: 10
- Armament: 1 × 1-pounder gun; 1 × machine gun

USS Wiwoka (SP-250) was a United States Navy patrol vessel in commission from 1917 to 1918.

Wiwoka was built as the civilian motorboat Idylease III in 1912 by Murray and Tregurtha at South Boston, Massachusetts. Idylease III had been renamed Wiwoka by the time the U.S. Navy acquired her from her owner, Mr. Joseph V. Gallagher of New York City, on 25 July 1917 for World War I service as a patrol vessel. She was commissioned as USS Wiwoka (SP-250) on 11 September 1917.

Wiwoka performed section patrol duty in the New York City area for the remainder of World War I.

Hostilities ceased on 11 November 1918, and Wiwoka was decommissioned shortly thereafter—probably in December 1918, because her armament was removed on 18 December 1918. She was returned to Gallagher on 17 January 1919, and her name was stricken from the Navy Directory that same day.
