= USS Winifred =

Cargo ship of the United States Navy

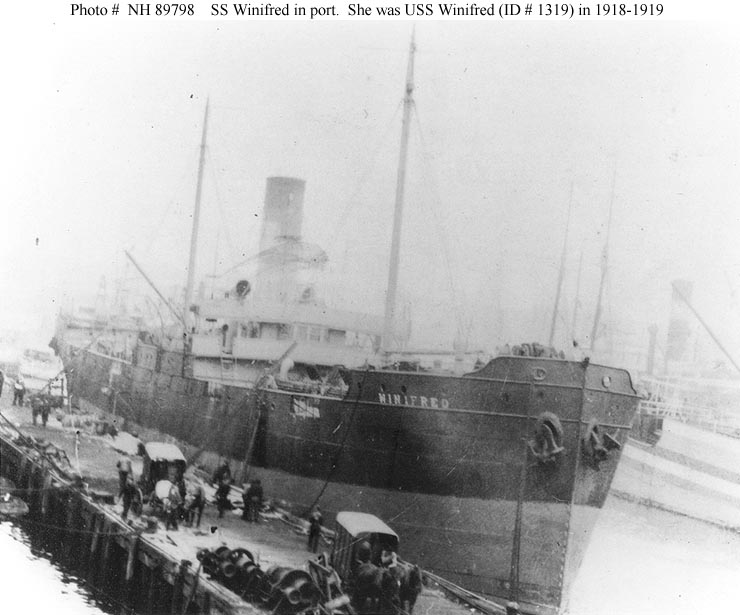
- SS Winifred in Europe, prior to her U.S. Navy service.

History

United States
- Name: USS Winifred
- Namesake: Previous name retained
- Builder: Bath Iron Works, Bath, Maine
- Laid down: 31 January 1898
- Launched: 8 July 1898
- Completed: 1 October 1898
- Acquired: 21 June 1918
- Commissioned: 21 June 1918
- Decommissioned: 13 March 1919
- Stricken: 13 March 1919
- Fate: Transferred to United States Shipping Board on 13 March 1919, Returned to owners
- Notes: In commercial service from 1898-1919, Abandoned due to age and deterioration in 1936

General characteristics
- Type: Cargo ship and tanker
- Tonnage: 2,551 Gross register tons
- Displacement: 5,850 tons
- Length: 290 ft 0 in (88.39 m)
- Beam: 42 ft 2 in (12.85 m)
- Draft: 18 ft 9 in (5.72 m) (mean)
- Depth: 21 ft 0 in (6.40 m)
- Propulsion: Steam engine, one shaft
- Speed: 10 knots
- Complement: 55
- Armament: 2 × 4-inch (102-millimeter) guns, 1 × machine gun

USS Winifred (ID-1319) was a cargo ship and tanker that served in the United States Navy from 1918 to 1919.

== Construction ==
Winifred was laid down as the first steel-hulled, single-screw cargo ship SS Winifred on 31 January 1898 at Bath, Maine by Bath Iron Works. Launched on 8 July 1898, she was delivered to her managing owners, Hiller, Bull, and Knowlton of New York City, on 1 October 1898. Winfred, the first steel tramp steamer designed and built in the United States, was built to operate for the New York and Porto Rico Steamship Company.

Basic specifications as built are given as 304 feet 3 inches (92.7 m) length overall, 290 feet 0 inches (88.4 m) length L.W.L., 283.5 feet (86.4 m) registered length, 42 feet 0 inches (12.8 m) beam molded, 42.2 feet (12.9 m) registered beam, 25 feet 10.5 inches (7.9 m) depth molded center, 20 feet 0 inches (6.1 m) loaded draft with a gross tonnage of 2,456.48. (Note: The 1908 reference states "Gross tonnage" but this is not today's Gross Tonnage standardized in the 1960s. Likely, though not specified, is that era's measure of Gross Register Tonnage by one of several methods.) Watertight compartments were formed by six watertight bulkheads running up to the weather deck and two partial transverse bulkheads.

Propulsion machinery was a vertical triple expansion engine with cylinders of 20.5 inches (52.1 cm), 34 inches (86.4 cm) and 55 inches (139.7 cm) with stroke of 36 inches (91.4 cm) delivering about 1,100 horsepower at 100 revolutions turning a four-bladed propeller of 13 feet (4.0 m) for a normal cruising speed of over 10 knots.

The ship had accommodations for up to eighteen passengers.

== Service history ==
=== 1898-1918 ===
Winifred initially operated on the New York-to-Puerto Rico route. By late in 1917, Winifred was operating as a commercial oil tanker under the auspices of the Gulf Refining Company of Port Arthur, Texas. In the autumn of 1917, with the participation of the United States in World War I well underway, she was armed, and on 17 October 1917, a U.S. Navy Naval Armed Guard unit under the command of Chief Boatswain's Mate W. A. Moon was placed aboard her. After docking at Bayonne, New Jersey, to take on a cargo of oil, Winifred shifted to Hampton Roads, Virginia, where she joined a convoy. Departing Hampton Roads on 8 November 1917, she reached Dover, England on 29 November 1917 and Gravesend, Kent on 30 November 1917. She remained in British waters for the remainder of 1917, touching at Sheerness in England, Cardiff in Wales, and Dover. Winifred operated in European waters into the summer of 1918.

=== 1918-1919 ===
The U.S. Navy acquired Winifred for World War I service on 21 June 1918 while she was in drydock at Liverpool, England. Assigned naval registry Identification Number (Id. No.) 1319, she was commissioned as USS Winifred the same day.

Assigned to the Naval Overseas Transportation Service and operating primarily from Cardiff, Winifred performed coastwise service in British waters and service across the English Channel, lifting supplies from English to French ports and vice versa, through the end of World War I.

Winifred departed Liverpool on 12 December 1918 and proceeded to the United States via the Azores, arriving at New York City on 8 January 1919. Shifting to Philadelphia, Pennsylvania soon thereafter, she was decommissioned there on 13 March 1919. Simultaneously struck from the Naval Vessel Register, she was turned over to the United States Shipping Board on the same day for disposal.

=== 1919-1936 ===
Winifred was returned to the Gulf Refining Company. Once again SS Winifred, she operated from her home port of Port Arthur, Texas until 1936, when she was abandoned due to age and deterioration.
