= USS Wheeling =

USS Wheeling is a name used more than once by the U.S. Navy:

- USS Wheeling (PG-14), laid down on 11 April 1896 at San Francisco, California, by the Union Iron Works.
- USNS Wheeling (T-AGM-8), laid down on 10 April 1945 as Seton Hall Victory by the Oregon Shipbuilding Corp. under a Maritime Commission contract (MCV hull 686); launched on 22 May 1945.
