= USS Zipalong =

Patrol vessel of the United States Navy

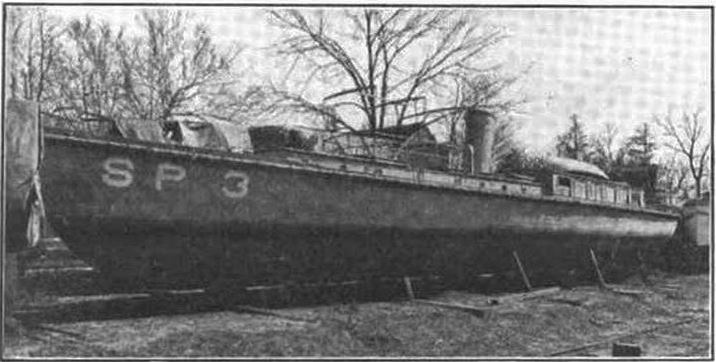
- USS Zipalong (SP-3)

History

United States
- Name: Zipalong
- Namesake: Previous name retained
- Builder: George Lawley & Son, Boston, Massachusetts
- Completed: 1907
- Acquired: Spring 1917
- Commissioned: 13 June 1917
- Decommissioned: 27 November 1917
- Fate: Returned to owners early 1918
- Notes: Operated as private motorboat Gansetta and Zipalong 1907-1917 and Zipalong from early 1918

General characteristics
- Type: Patrol vessel
- Displacement: 30 long tons (30.5 t)
- Length: 78 ft 0 in (23.77 m)
- Beam: 11 ft 2 in (3.40 m)
- Draft: 4 ft 0 in (1.22 m) mean
- Installed power: 125 hp (93 kW) gasoline engine
- Propulsion: 1 × Propeller
- Speed: 15 kn (28 km/h; 17 mph)
- Complement: 8
- Armament: 1 × machine gun

USS Zipalong (SP-3) was an armed motorboat that served in the United States Navy as a patrol vessel during 1917.

Zipalong was a wooden-hulled motorboat built in 1907 at Boston, Massachusetts, by George Lawley & Son with the name Gansetta, which was subsequently renamed Zipalong.

The U.S. Navy acquired Zipalong in the spring of 1917 from Albert and Leonard Schwarz and W. W. Miller for service in World War I. Assigned the classification SP-3, she was commissioned on 13 June 1917 at the Philadelphia Navy Yard, Philadelphia, Pennsylvania, as USS Zipalong.

With her section base at Cape May, New Jersey, Zipalong conducted local section patrols within the 4th Naval District into the autumn of 1917.

Decommissioned on 27 November 1917 at Philadelphia, Zipalong was returned to her owners in early 1918 and resumed her civilian pursuits.
