= Wenatchee (YTB-808) =

Tugboat of the United States Navy

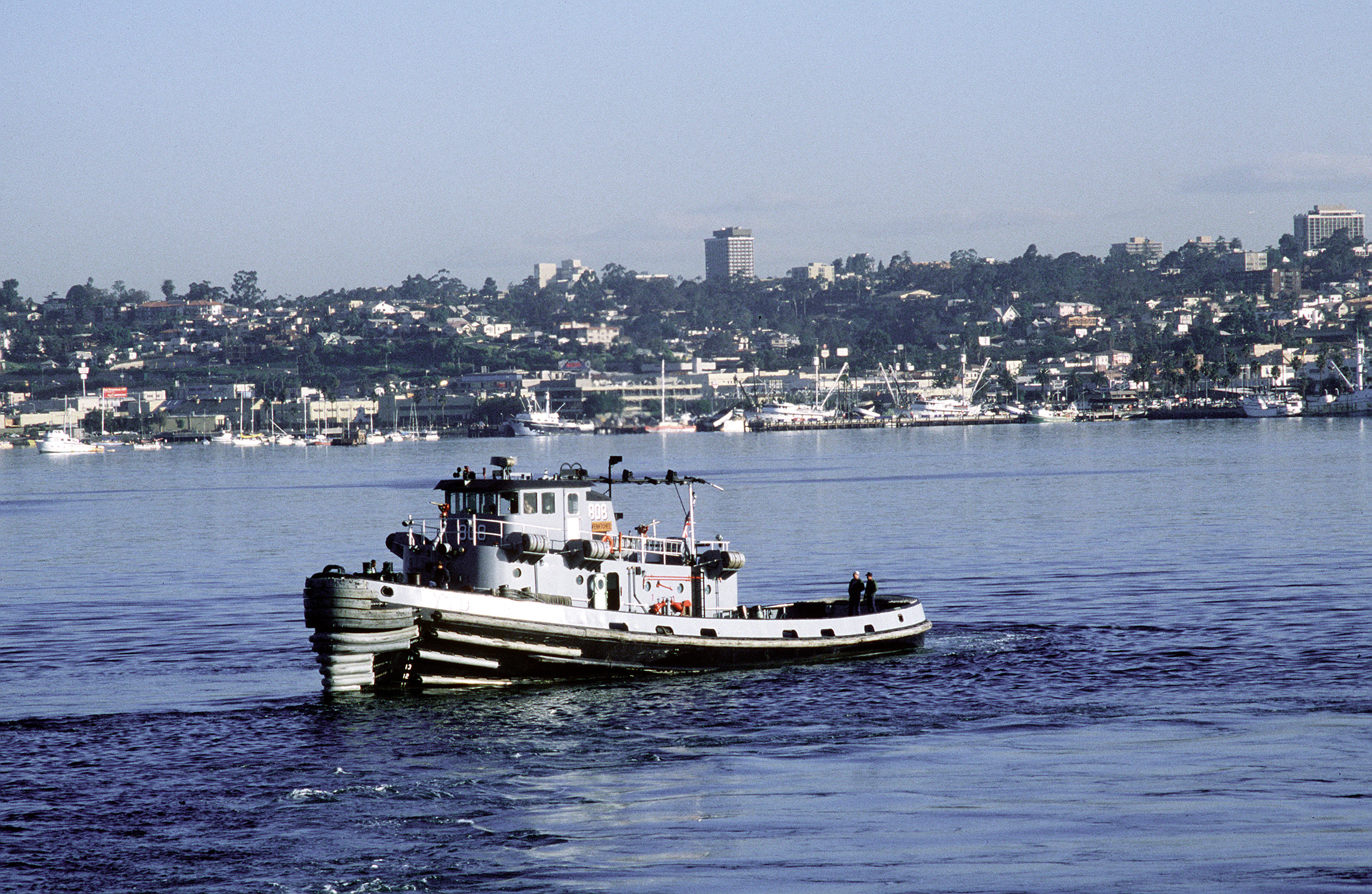
- Wenatchee underway in San Diego harbor, 14 December 1984

History

United States
- Awarded: 4 March 1969
- Builder: Peterson Builders, Sturgeon Bay, WI
- Laid down: 19 December 1969
- Launched: 7 July 1970
- In service: 21 December 1970
- Stricken: 27 September 2011
- Fate: Sold 2013

General characteristics
- Class & type: Natick-class large harbor tug
- Displacement: 282 long tons (287 t) (light); 344 long tons (350 t) (full)
- Length: 109 ft (33 m)
- Beam: 31 ft (9.4 m)
- Draft: 14 ft (4.3 m)
- Speed: 12 knots (14 mph; 22 km/h)
- Complement: 12
- Armament: None

Wenatchee (YTB-808) was a United States Navy Natick-class large harbor tug named for Wenatchee, Washington.

== Construction ==
The contract for Wenatchee was awarded 4 March 1969. She was laid down on 24 November 1969 at Sturgeon Bay, Wisconsin, by Peterson Builders and launched 7 July 1970.

== Operational history ==
Placed in service on Christmas Day 1970, Wenatchee was assigned to the 11th Naval District and, since going into service, has operated at San Diego, Calif.

Sometime prior to December 2005, Wenatchee was reassigned to Bremerton, Washington.

Stricken from the Navy List 27 September 2011 and sold for commercial use 2013.
