= USS Wakulla =

USS Wakulla is a name used more than once by the United States Navy:

- USS Wakulla (ID-3147), a cargo ship in commission from 1918 to 1919
- USS Wakulla (AOG-44), a gasoline tanker in commission from 1945 to 1946
