= USS William C. Lawe =

USS William C. Lawe has been the name of more than one United States Navy ship, and may refer to:

- USS William C. Lawe (DE-313), a destroyer escort cancelled during construction in 1944
- USS William C. Lawe (DE-373), a destroyer escort cancelled prior to construction in 1944
- USS William C. Lawe (DD-763), a destroyer in commission from 1946 to 1983
