= USS Wakonda =

Tugboat of the United States Navy

History

United States
- Name: USS Wakonda
- Namesake: "Wakonda", A term used by Native Americans of the Sioux family when praying, and also applied by them to objects or phenomena regarded as sacred or mysterious
- Builder: Gibbs Gas Engine Company, Jacksonville, Florida (planned)
- Laid down: Never
- Notes: Construction contract cancelled October 1945

General characteristics
- Class & type: Hisada-class tug
- Displacement: 310 tons (full)
- Length: 101 ft 0 in (30.78 m)
- Beam: 28 ft 0 in (8.53 m)
- Draft: 9 ft 7 in (2.92 m)
- Speed: 12 knots
- Complement: 10

USS Wakonda (YTB-528) was a large yard tug proposed for the United States Navy that was not built.

Wakonda was a Hisada-class large yard tug slated to be built at Jacksonville, Florida, by the Gibbs Gas Engine Company, but the contract for her construction was cancelled in October 1945. The ship was never built.
