= USS Whitecap =

Patrol vessel of the United States Navy

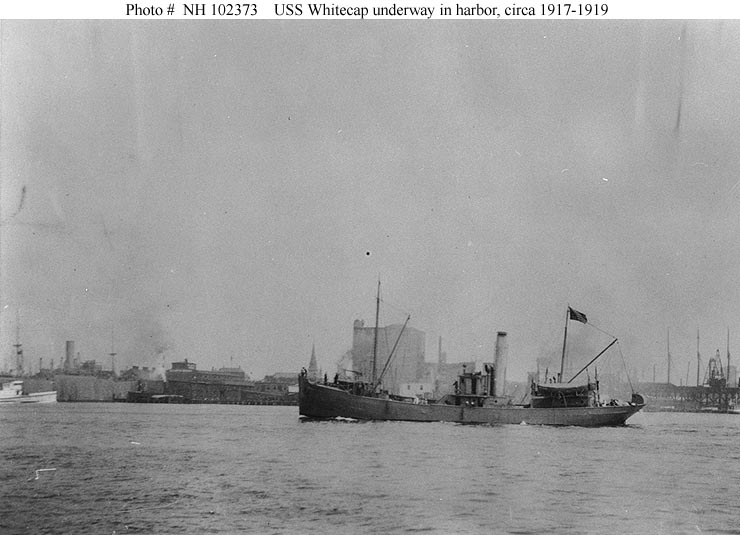
- USS Whitecap

History

United States
- Name: USS Whitecap
- Namesake: Previous name retained
- Builder: Manitowoc Shipbuilding Company, Manitowoc, Wisconsin
- Completed: 1916
- Acquired: 28 April 1917
- Commissioned: 8 May 1917
- Decommissioned: 11 March 1919
- Fate: Returned to owners 1 April 1919
- Notes: Operated as commercial fishing trawler Whitecap 1916-1917 and from 1919

General characteristics
- Type: Patrol vessel
- Tonnage: 303 tons
- Length: 143 ft (44 m)
- Beam: 22 ft 8 in (6.91 m)
- Draft: 13 ft 5 in (4.09 m) (aft)
- Speed: 11 knots
- Complement: 18
- Armament: 1 × 6-pounder gun; 1 × 3-inch (76.2-millimeter) gun

USS Whitecap (SP-340) was a United States Navy patrol vessel in commission from 1917 to 1919.

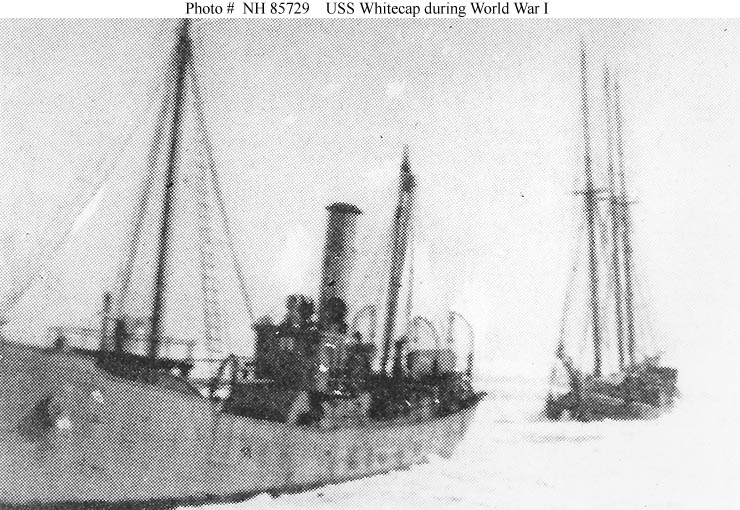
USS Whitecap (left) towing a heavily laden schooner through icy waters.

Whitecap was built in 1916 as a commercial fishing trawler of the same name by Manitowoc Shipbuilding Company at Manitowoc, Wisconsin. The U.S. Navy acquired Whitecap from the Bay State Fisheries Company of South Boston, Massachusetts, on 28 April 1917 for World War I service as a patrol vessel, and commissioned her as USS Whitecap (SP-340) on 8 May 1917.

Initially attached to the 1st Naval District in northern New England, Whitecap began operations out of the 2nd Naval District in southern New England in late February 1918. During her naval career, Whitecap operated primarily out of Newport, Rhode Island, patrolling between that base and New London, Connecticut. Occasionally, her coastal patrols took her to Nantucket Island off Massachusetts, Block Island off Rhode Island, and Montauk Point, Long Island, New York, as well as to New York City. When not at sea keeping tabs on the coastwise traffic of naval and merchant vessels, Whitecap performed local tow and escort service out of Newport.

Decommissioned at Boston, Massachusetts, on 11 March 1919, Whitecap was returned to the Bay State Fisheries Company on 1 April 1919. Her name was struck from the Navy List, and Whitecap resumed her peacetime fishing pursuits
