= USS Wandank =

Ship name

USS Wandank has been the name of more than one United States Navy ship, and may refer to:

- USS Wandank (AT-26), originally Fleet Tug No. 26, later ATO-26, a fleet tug in commission from 1920 to 1922 and from 1922 to 1946
- USS Wandank (ATA-204), named USS ATA-204 from 1945 to 1952, an auxiliary ocean-going tug in commission from 1945 to 1947 and from 1952 to 1971.
