= USS Wyandotte =

USS Wyandotte is a name used for two ships of the United States Navy:

- USS Wyandotte (1853), a steamer built at Philadelphia, Pennsylvania, in 1853 which served in the American Civil War.
- USS Wyandotte (1864), a Canonicus-class monitor originally named Tippecanoe which was launched in 1864.
