= USS Wasp (SP-1159) =

Patrol vessel of the United States Navy

History

United States
- Name: USS Wasp
- Namesake: In naming SP-1159 "Wasp", the Navy honors six previous ships, dating to the American Revolution, which have borne this illustrious name.
- Builder: Superior Shipbuilding Company
- Completed: 1910
- Acquired: 29 June 1917
- Fate: Returned to owner 3 November 1917

General characteristics
- Type: Steel-hulled motorboat
- Length: 40 ft 0 in (12.19 m)
- Beam: 9 ft 0 in (2.74 m)
- Draft: 2 ft 9 in (0.84 m) mean
- Speed: 12 knots
- Complement: 5 men
- Armament: 1 × 1-pounder gun

Although not officially counted among the ten U.S. Navy ships named Wasp because she was never entered into the Naval Vessel Register, a steel-hulled motorboat named USS Wasp (SP-1159) performed patrol duties under lease to the U.S. Navy in 1917.

Wasp was built in 1910 at the Superior Shipbuilding Company and was owned by W. S. Pattison of Duluth, Minnesota, in 1917, when the U.S. Navy inspected the ship, in the 9th Naval District, for possible service. Wasp was acquired by the Navy on a free-lease basis on 29 June 1917 and was assigned the classification SP-1159 but was never listed in the Naval Vessel Register. She was used as a patrol craft by the 9th Naval District—at the time a part of a single administrative entity called the "9th, 10th, and 11th Naval Districts"—and operated on the Great Lakes until returned to her owner on 3 November 1917.
