= USS Zaca =

USS Zaca has been the name of two ships of the United States Navy:

- USS Zaca (ID-3792), a cargo ship in commission from 1918 to 1919
- USS Zaca (IX-73), a yacht in commission as a rescue ship from 1942 to 1944, and later purchased by Errol Flynn
