= USS Wave (SP-1706) =

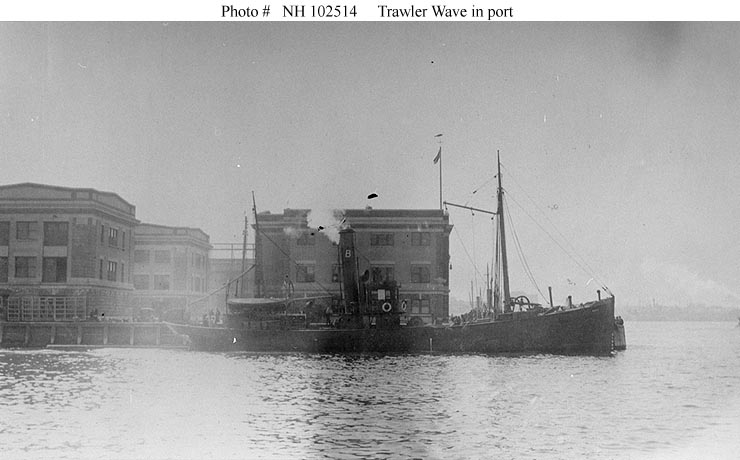
- Wave in civilian use prior to World War I

History

United States
- Name: USS Wave
- Builder: Fore River Shipbuilding Company, Quincy, Massachusetts
- Completed: 1912 or 1913.
- Acquired: Never
- Notes: Civilian fishing trawler ordered delivered to Navy in 1917 and 1918 but never taken over by Navy

General characteristics
- Type: Minesweeper
- Displacement: 450 tons (nominal)
- Length: 119 ft 8 in (36.47 m)
- Beam: 22 ft 6 in (6.86 m)
- Draft: 12 ft 9 in (3.89 m) mean
- Propulsion: Steam
- Speed: 10 knots
- Notes: Conversion to minesweeper never occurred

What would have been the third USS Wave (SP-1706) was a trawler the United States Navy considered for use as a minesweeper in 1917 and 1918 but which was never actually transferred to the Navy.

Wave was a fishing trawler built by the Fore River Shipbuilding Company at Quincy, Massachusetts, in 1912 or 1913. Owned by the Bay State Fishing Company, she was inspected by representatives of the Commandant, 1st Naval District, during the spring of 1917. The Navy ordered her delivered for World War I service in June 1917 and again in June 1918, and went so far as to assign her the classification SP-1706 and make plans for her conversion to a minesweeper and assignment to the 1st Naval District. However, the Navy did not actually take her over, and she remained in the hands of her owner and never saw naval service.
