= USS Wissahickon =

USS Wissahickon has been the name of more than one United States Navy ship, and may refer to:

- USS Wissahickon (1861), a gunboat in commission from 1861 to 1865
- USS Wissahickon (SP-852), named USS SP-852 for part of her career, a patrol vessel in commission from 1917 to 1919
