= USS Yacona =

USS Yacona may refer to one of these United States Navy ships:

- USS Yacona (SP-617), a steel-hulled screw steam yacht built in 1898 at Kinghorn, Scotland.
- USS Yacona (AOG-45), laid down on 23 November 1944 at Bayonne, New Jersey.
