= USS Zoraya =

Steam yacht and US Navy patrol craft

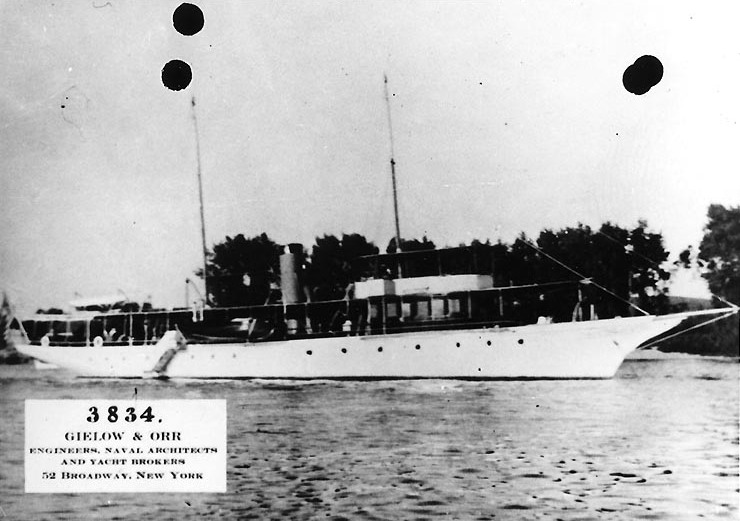
- Steam yacht Zoraya sometime between 1901 and 1917

History

United States
- Name: USS Zoraya
- Namesake: Previous name retained
- Owner: Atala W. Thayer
- Port of registry: Port Jefferson, New York
- Builder: J. M. Bayles and Sons, Port Jefferson, New York
- Completed: 1901
- Acquired: 16 August 1917
- Commissioned: 17 December 1917
- Fate: Returned to owner 8 February 1919

General characteristics
- Type: armed yacht
- Tonnage: 129 GRT, 88 NRT
- Length: 135 ft 0 in (41.15 m) overall; 113.4 ft (34.6 m) registered
- Beam: 18.0 ft (5.5 m)
- Draft: 7 ft 6 in (2.29 m) mean
- Depth: 10.8 ft (3.3 m)
- Installed power: 17 NHP
- Propulsion: 1 × triple-expansion engine; 1 × screw
- Speed: 12 knots (22 km/h)
- Complement: 33
- Armament: 2 × 3-pounder guns

USS Zoraya (SP-235) was an armed yacht that served in the United States Navy from 1917 to 1919.

Zoraya was a wooden-hulled steam yacht constructed in 1901 by J. M. Bayles and Sons at Port Jefferson, New York, for Ms. Atala W. Thayer. The U.S. Navy acquired her from a later owner, Mr. William Biel, for World War I service with the section patrol on 16 August 1917. She was armed, designated SP-235, and commissioned at New York City on 17 December 1917.

For the duration of the war, USS Zoraya served under the command of the Commandant, 3rd Naval District, and patrolled the coasts of New York and New Jersey.

The Navy returned Zoraya to her owners on 8 February 1919, some three months after the end of hostilities.
