= USS Wissoe II =

Patrol vessel of the United States Navy

History

United States
- Name: USS Wissoe II
- Namesake: Previous name retained
- Builder: New York Yacht, Launch, and Engine Company, Morris Heights, Bronx, New York
- Completed: 1916
- Acquired: 23 April 1917
- Commissioned: 30 April 1917
- Stricken: 18 January 1919
- Fate: Returned to owner 18 January 1919
- Notes: Operated as private motorboat Wissoe II 1916-1917 and from 1919

General characteristics
- Type: Patrol vessel
- Tonnage: 67 Gross register tons
- Length: 83 ft 6 in (25.45 m)
- Beam: 16 ft 6 in (5.03 m)
- Draft: 4 ft 8 in (1.42 m) (aft)
- Speed: 10.5 knots
- Complement: 11
- Armament: 2 × 1-pounder guns; 1 × machine gun

USS Wissoe II (SP-153) was an armed motorboat that served in the United States Navy as a patrol vessel from 1917 to 1919.

Wissoe II was built as a civilian motorboat in 1916 by the New York Yacht, Launch, and Engine Company at Morris Heights in the Bronx, New York. The U.S. Navy acquired her on 23 April 1917 from her owner, Mr. George L. Carnegie of Fernandina, Florida, for use as a patrol boat during World War I. She was commissioned on 30 April 1917 as USS Wissoe II (SP-153).

Wissoe II was assigned to the 6th Naval District, where she operated as a section patrol boat along the southeastern coast of the United States, guarding against incursions by German submarines.

Wissoe II was decommissioned soon after the end of the war. She was returned to her owner on 18 January 1919, and was stricken from the Navy Directory the same day.

== Bibliography ==
- Photo gallery of USS Wissoe II at NavSource Naval History
