= USS Winnetka =

History

United States
- Name: USS Winnetka
- Builder: Gulfport Boiler & Welding Works, Inc.
- Laid down: 1944
- Launched: 1944
- Acquired: 28 June 1944
- Commissioned: 28 June 1944
- In service: 1944
- Out of service: 1946
- Stricken: 19 July 1946
- Fate: Ran aground off Iwo Jima, 1946, damaged beyond economical repair and abandoned
- Notes: Ship International Radio Callsign: NQAT

General characteristics
- Class & type: Allaquippa-class harbor tug
- Displacement: 318 tons (full)
- Length: 102 ft 2 in (31.14 m)
- Beam: 25 ft (7.6 m)
- Draft: 10 ft 5 in (3.18 m)
- Propulsion: Diesel-electric, single propeller, 1,000 shp (750 kW)
- Speed: 12 knots (22 km/h; 14 mph)
- Range: 4,500 nautical miles (8,300 km; 5,200 mi)

USS Winnetka was a harbor tug in service with the United States Navy, built in 1944 at Port Arthur, Texas, by the Gulfport Boiler & Welding Works, Inc. She was placed in service on 28 June 1944. She departed Galveston, Texas on 18 July and proceeded via the Panama Canal to the Pacific. The tug served for some time at Pearl Harbor but, by the beginning of 1945, had moved west to the Marianas Islands for operations principally at Guam and Saipan. She was later reassigned to the naval base at Iwo Jima in the Volcano-Bonins chain and served there until January 1946 when she ran aground on Iwo Jima. Damaged beyond economic repair and not economically salvageable, Winnetka was abandoned where she lay. Her name was struck from the Navy list on 19 July 1946.

== Ship Awards ==
- American Campaign Medal
- World War Two Victory Medal
- Asiatic Pacific Campaign Medal
