= USS Wahtah =

Tugboat of the United States Navy

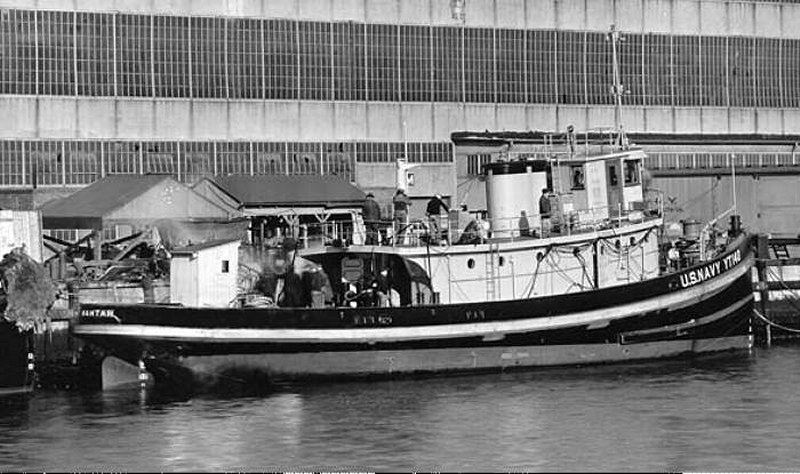

History

United States
- Name: USS Wahtah
- Namesake: "Wahtah", a Native American word for ship
- Builder: Norfolk Navy Yard, Portsmouth, Virginia
- Laid down: 28 August 1939
- Launched: 14 December 1939
- Reclassified: Large harbor tug (YTB-140) on 15 May 1944
- Stricken: 15 October 1974
- Identification: IMO number: 8434398
- Fate: Sold soon after being struck

General characteristics
- Class & type: Woban-class harbor tug
- Displacement: 300 tons
- Length: 100 ft 9 in (30.71 m)
- Beam: 27 ft 10 in (8.48 m)
- Draft: 9 ft 7 in (2.92 m)
- Propulsion: 1000hp diesel-electric, two Enterprise engines

USS Wahtah (YT-140), later YTB-140, was a United States Navy harbor tug in commission from 1939 to 1946.

Wahtah was laid down on 28 August 1939 at Portsmouth, Virginia, by the Norfolk Navy Yard. She was launched on 14 December 1939, sponsored by Miss Marie Yvonne Thornton, and soon thereafter was placed in service at the Washington Navy Yard in Washington, D.C.

For the remainder of her active career, Wahtah remained attached to the Washington Navy Yard performing local tugging and towing operations, providing waterfront fire protection, and other related services. She was reclassified as a large harbor tug and redesignated YTB-140 on 15 May 1944.

Struck from the Navy List on 15 October 1974, she was soon sold.
