= USS Zita =

Patrol vessel of the United States Navy

History

United States
- Name: USS Zita
- Namesake: Previous name retained
- Completed: 1916
- Acquired: 1917
- Commissioned: Not known whether or not officially commissioned
- Notes: Built for private use; privately owned 1916-1917

General characteristics
- Type: Patrol vessel
- Displacement: 7 tons
- Length: 40 ft 0 in (12.19 m)
- Beam: 11 ft 0 in (3.35 m)
- Draft: 2 ft 4.5 in (0.724 m) mean
- Speed: 11 knots
- Complement: 6
- Armament: 1 × 1-pounder gun

USS Zita (SP-21) was a motorboat that the United States Navy assigned to service as a patrol vessel in 1917 during World War I.

Zita was a wooden-hulled motorboat built in 1916 at Brooklyn, New York, by Charles Johnson.

H. E. Boucher, of Brooklyn, owned Zita in 1917 at the time of her inspection by the U.S. Navy in the 3rd Naval District.

Records concerning Zita are sparse, but they show that the Navy gave the classification SP-21 to the boat and assigned her to district patrol duties in the 3rd Naval District.

Extant records do not reveal either the length or the character of her service nor do they tell whether or not Zita was ever officially commissioned.
