= USS Yellowstone =

USS Yellowstone may refer to more than one United States Navy ship:

- USS Yellowstone (ID-2657), a cargo ship in commission from 1918 to 1919
- USS Yellowstone (AD-27), a destroyer tender in commission from 1946 to 1974
- USS Yellowstone (AD-41), a destroyer tender in commission from 1980 to 1996
