= USS Wapakoneta =

USS Wapakoneta has been the name of more than one United States Navy ship, and may refer to:

- USS PC-579, a patrol craft in commission from 1942 to 1955, which was given the name USS Wapakoneta (PC-579) in February 1956 after she was decommissioned and which she held while in reserve until stricken in 1960.
- Wapakoneta (YTB-766), a large harbor tug in service from 1963 to 2001
