= USS Wasaka III =

Patrol vessel of the United States Navy

History

United States
- Name: USS Wasaka III
- Namesake: Previous name retained
- Builder: Britt Brothers, Lynn, Massachusetts.
- Acquired: Spring 1917
- Commissioned: Probably spring 1917
- Decommissioned: Probably March or April 1919
- Stricken: Probably March or April 1919
- Fate: Returned to owner 18 April 1919
- Notes: Built as private motorboat Wasaka III

General characteristics
- Type: Patrol vessel
- Length: 53 ft 0 in (16.15 m)
- Beam: 10 ft 0 in (3.05 m)
- Speed: 9 knots
- Complement: 6
- Armament: 1 × 1-pounder gun; 1 × Colt machine gun

USS Wasaka III (SP-342) was an armed motorboat that served in the United States Navy as a patrol vessel from 1917 to 1919.

== Background ==
Wasaka III was a wooden-hulled motorboat built at Lynn, Massachusetts, by Britt Brothers. Acquired by the U.S. Navy in the spring of 1917 for World War I service from Mr. John J. Martin of Boston, Massachusetts, under a free-lease agreement, Wasaka III apparently was manned by the Navy on 22 April 1917, as her deck log indicates that the first men — the most senior rating being a Machinist's Mate 2nd Class A. Rowbottom, USNRF — reported on board on that day. There is no record of a commissioning, and the deck log does not start until 1 June 1917.

Initially, Wasaka III - classified as SP-342 — operated from the Commonwealth Pier at Boston. On 26 September 1917, she shifted to the Bumkin Island section base, whence she operated for the duration of the war and into 1919.

Wasaka III's log ends on 31 March 1919, and she was returned to her owner on 18 April 1919.
