= USS Wyandance =

Patrol vessel of the United States Navy

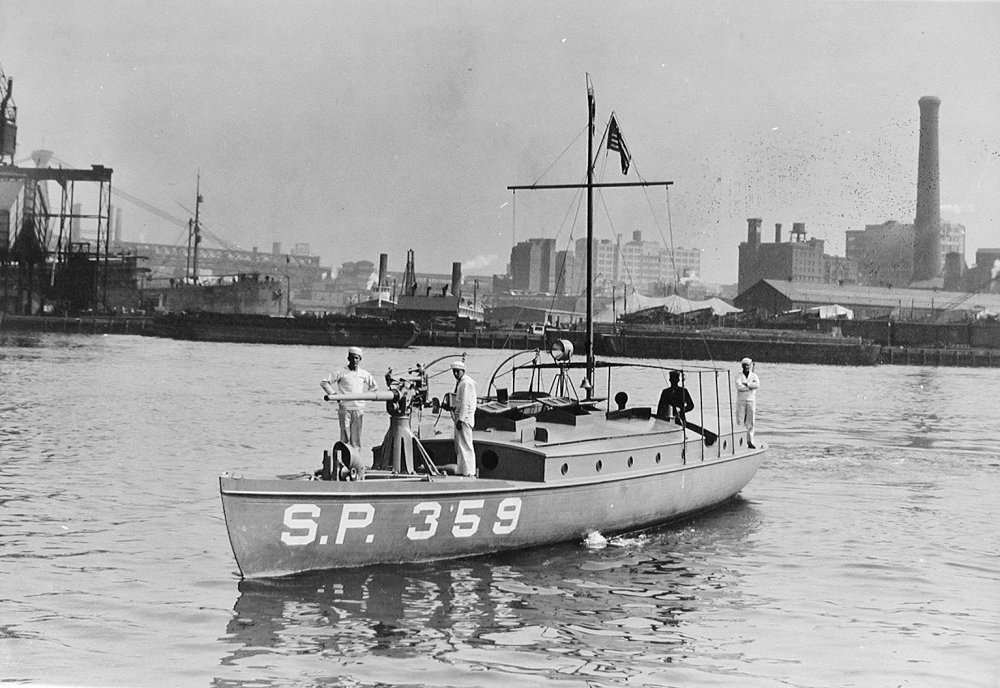
- USS Wyandance (SP-359) at the Brooklyn Navy Yard on 2 October 1917.

History

United States
- Name: USS Wyandance
- Namesake: Previous name retained
- Builder: Electric Boat Company, Bayonne, New Jersey
- Completed: 1905
- Acquired: 19 June 1917
- Commissioned: 24 August 1917
- Decommissioned: Early 1918
- Stricken: 2 February 1918
- Fate: Returned to owner 2 February 1918
- Notes: Operated as private motorboat Wyandance 1905-1917 and from 1918

General characteristics
- Type: Patrol vessel
- Tonnage: 21 gross register tons
- Length: 60 ft 11 in (18.57 m)
- Beam: 11 ft 7 in (3.53 m)
- Draft: 1 ft 11 in (0.58 m) forward
- Depth: 5 ft 7 in (1.70 m)
- Speed: 14.25 knots
- Complement: 5
- Armament: 2 × 1-pounder guns

USS Wyandance (SP-359) was a patrol boat that served in the United States Navy from 1917 to 1918.

Wyandance was built as a private motorboat of the same name in 1905 by the Electric Boat Company at Bayonne, New Jersey. On 19 June 1917, the U.S. Navy acquired her from her owner, Mr. M. S. Burrill of Jericho, Long Island, New York, for use as a patrol boat during World War I. She was commissioned as USS Wyandance (SP-359) on 24 August 1917 at New York City.

Assigned to the 3rd Naval District, Wyandance served on section patrol duties in the New York City area for about five months.

Wyandance was decommissioned early in 1918. The Navy returned her to her owner on 2 February 1918, and she was stricken from the Navy Directory the same day.
