= USS Wandena =

Patrol vessel of the United States Navy

History

United States
- Name: USS Wandena
- Namesake: Previous name retained
- Builder: New York Yacht, Launch, and Engine Company, Morris Heights, New York
- Completed: 1913
- Acquired: 28 June 1917
- Commissioned: 5 November 1917
- Decommissioned: 7 May 1919
- Stricken: 24 April 1919
- Fate: Sold 10 September 1919
- Notes: Operated as private motorboat Chipper and Wandena 1913-1917

General characteristics
- Type: Patrol vessel
- Tonnage: 38 Gross register tons
- Length: 65 ft 0 in (19.81 m)
- Beam: 13 ft 0 in (3.96 m)
- Draft: 3 ft 6 in (1.07 m) mean
- Speed: 11 knots
- Complement: 10
- Armament: 2 × 1-pounder guns

USS Wandena (SP-354) was an armed motorboat that served in the United States Navy as a patrol vessel from 1917 to 1919.

Wandena was built as the private wooden-hulled motorboat Chipper in 1913 at the New York Yacht, Launch, and Engine Company in Morris Heights, New York. She subsequently was renamed Wandena.

The U.S. Navy acquired Wandena from J. B. Nichols for World War I service as a patrol vessel. Delivered to the Navy on 28 June 1917, she was armed, assigned the designation SP-354, and commissioned as USS Wandena at the New York Navy Yard in Brooklyn, New York, on 5 November 1917.

For the duration of World War I, Wandena performed local section patrol duties in the 3rd Naval District out of Section Base No. 10. She probably ceased such defensive patrols on 24 November 1918 as specified by the order that date to all naval districts.

Struck from the Navy List on 24 April 1919 and decommissioned on 7 May 1919, Wandena was sold on 10 September 1919.
