= USS Wood =

USS Wood may refer to various United States Navy ships:

- USS Wood (DD-317), a Clemson-class destroyer in commission from 1919 to 1930
- USS Wood (AP-101/APA-56), a transport, later reclassified as an attack transport, launched in 1943 and renamed USS Leedstown (APA-56) before commissioning

== See also ==
- USS William M. Wood, the name of various ships
