= USS W. L. Bartlett =

Schooner

History

United States
- Name: USS W. F. Bartlett
- Namesake: Previous name retained
- Acquired: 13 August 1861
- Fate: Unknown
- Notes: Acquired for use as blockship

General characteristics
- Type: Schooner
- Sail plan: Schooner-rigged

USS W. F. Bartlett was a schooner acquired by the United States Navy in 1861.

W. L. Bartlett was a wooden-hulled Chesapeake Bay schooner acquired by the U.S. Navy on 13 August 1861 at Baltimore, Maryland. The Navy planned to use W. L. Bartlett and 21 other similar craft as blockships at entrances to inlets leading to the North Carolina sounds. The project — the U.S. Navy's first "stone fleet" venture -— ultimately failed.

No record of W. L. Bartlett's ultimate fate has been found.
