= USS W. L. Messick =

Former U.S. Navy minesweeper ship

History

United States
- Name: USS W. L. Messick
- Namesake: Previous name retained
- Owner: Joseph F. Bellows
- Builder: Smith and McCoy, Norfolk, Virginia
- Completed: 1911
- Acquired: April 7, 1917
- Commissioned: April 7, 1917
- Fate: Sold August 27, 1919

General characteristics
- Type: Minesweeper
- Tonnage: 237 tons gross
- Length: 145 ft 0 in (44.20 m)
- Beam: 23 ft 0 in (7.01 m)
- Draft: 9 ft 0 in (2.74 m) mean
- Propulsion: Steam engine
- Complement: 36
- Armament: 1 × 6-pounder gun

USS W. L. Messick (SP-322) was a minesweeper that served in the United States Navy from 1917 to 1919.

W. L. Messick was a wooden-hulled, screw steamer built in 1911 at Norfolk, Virginia, by Smith and McCoy. The U.S. Navy purchased her on April 7, 1917 from Joseph H. Bellows of Reedville, Virginia, for World War I service. Commissioned as USS W. L. Messick on the same day and classified as SP-322, she was assigned to the 5th Naval District and served as a minesweeper in the Virginia Capes area for the duration of World War I. She was subsequently decommissioned and sold on August 27, 1919 to her former owner.
