= USS Welch =

USS Welch is a name used more than once by the United States Navy:

- USS Welch (PC-817), a patrol craft commissioned on 13 July 1943.
- USS Welch (PG-93), a gunboat commissioned 8 September 1969.
