= USS Wave (YFB-10) =

History

United States
- Name: USS Wave
- Builder: Possibly the Charleston Navy Yard
- Acquired: 1916
- Reclassified: YFB-10 in July 1920
- Stricken: 20 January 1938

General characteristics
- Type: Ferryboat
- Length: 105 ft 0 in (32.00 m)
- Beam: 30 ft 0 in (9.14 m)
- Propulsion: 1 x 230 HP engine

USS Wave (YFB-10) was a United States Navy steel-hulled ferryboat that was commissioned in 1916 and struck in 1938. She was the third ship to receive this name.

== Construction ==
Wave was laid down on 7 March 1916, by Charleston Navy Yard, in Charleston, South Carolina. She was launched on 31 August 1916, completed in November 1916, and delivered to the Naval Training Station, in Newport, RI in the spring of 1917. She was 105 feet (32 m) long, and 30 feet (9.1 m) wide. She was propelled by a 230-horsepower engine.

== Service history ==
Soon after being placed in service, Wave was assigned to the Torpedo Station at Newport, Rhode Island. That may have been her only assignment since the few records of her service extant suggest that she served in the 2nd Naval District, which contained Newport until it was disbanded, and then in the 1st Naval District, which inherited Newport, throughout the remainder of her active career. In July 1920, as the Navy instituted its alphanumeric hull classification system, she received the designation YFB-10. Her name was struck from the Navy List on 20 January 1938. No record of her subsequent fate has been uncovered.
