= USS Yarrow =

Patrol vessel of the United States Navy

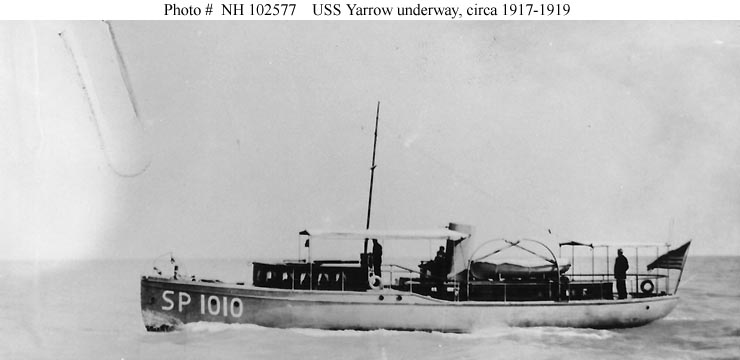
- USS Yarrow (SP-1010) underway on Lake Michigan during World War I.

History

United States
- Name: USS Yarrow
- Namesake: Previous name retained
- Builder: Kargard, Chicago, Illinois
- Completed: 1913
- Acquired: ca. July 1917; Formally leased 27 August 1917
- Commissioned: 27 July 1917
- Stricken: 7 March 1919
- Fate: Returned to owner 7 March 1919
- Notes: Operated as private motorboat Yarrow 1913-1917 and from 1919

General characteristics
- Type: Patrol vessel
- Tonnage: 29 Gross register tons
- Length: 65 ft (20 m)
- Beam: 13 ft (4.0 m)
- Draft: 5 ft (1.5 m) forward
- Speed: 13 miles per hour
- Complement: 8
- Armament: 1 × 3-pounder gun; 2 × machine guns

USS Yarrow (SP-1010) was a United States Navy patrol vessel in commission from 1917 to 1919.

Yarrow was built in 1913 as a private wooden-hulled motorboat of the same name by Kargard at Chicago, Illinois. In 1917, the U.S. Navy acquired Yarrow from her owner, K. D. Clark, for use as a section patrol boat during World War I. She was commissioned on 27 July 1917 as USS Yarrow (SP-1010) and the Navy formally acquired her from Clark under a free lease on 27 August 1917.

Assigned to the 9th Naval District, Yarrow patrolled the waters of Lake Michigan for the rest of the 1917 Great Lakes shipping season. After being laid up for the winter of 1917-1918 while the lakes were frozen over, she resumed her patrol duties in the spring of 1918 and continued them through the end of the 1918 shipping season late in the year.

The Navy returned Yarrow to Clark on 7 March 1919 and she was stricken from the Navy List the same day.
