= Wauwatosa (YTB-775) =

Tugboat of the United States Navy

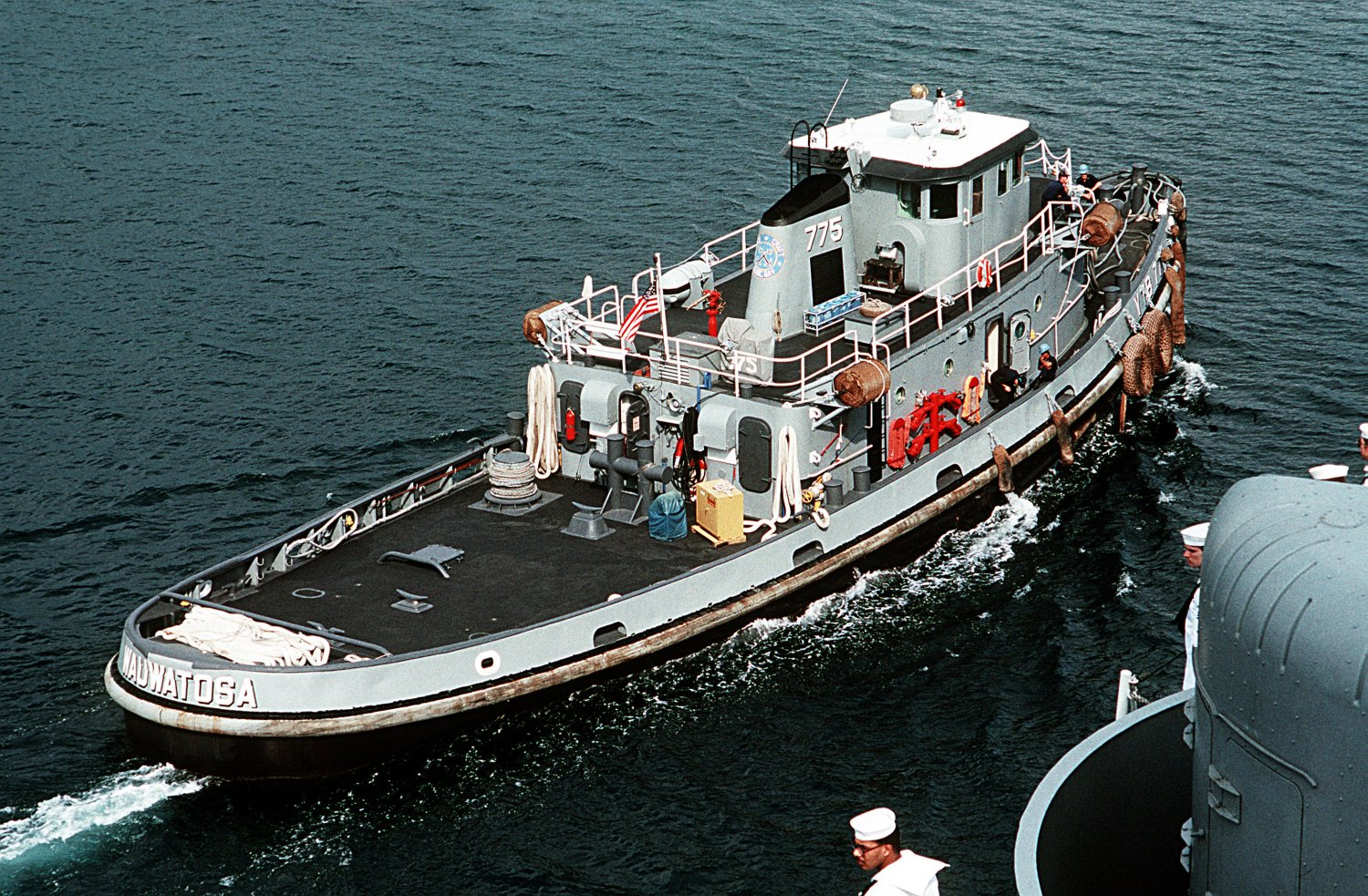
- Wauwatosa (YTB-775) entering port at Subic Bay Naval Station, Luzon Island, Republic of the Philippines, 8 December 1991.

History

United States
- Awarded: 31 January 1964
- Builder: Marinette Marine, Marinette, Wisconsin
- Laid down: 21 August 1964
- Launched: 19 May 1965
- Completed: 21 June 1965
- In service: 21 June 1965
- Stricken: 16 February 2002
- Fate: Scrapped, 9 May 2005

General characteristics
- Class & type: Natick-class
- Type: Large District Harbor Tug
- Displacement: 356 tons
- Length: 109 ft (33 m)
- Beam: 31 ft (9.4 m)
- Draft: 14 ft (4.3 m)
- Propulsion: Diesel engine, single screw
- Speed: 12 knots (14 mph; 22 km/h)
- Complement: 12

Wauwatosa (YTB-775) was a United States Navy Natick-class large harbor tug named for Wauwatosa, Wisconsin. The tug was placed in service, but never commissioned.

== Construction ==
The contract for Wauwatosa was awarded 31 January 1964. She was laid down on 21 August 1964 at Marinette, Wisconsin, by Marinette Marine and launched 19 May 1965.

== Operational history ==
Placed in service in June 1966, Wauwatosa served with the Pacific Fleet at Yokosuka Naval Base, Japan and Subic Bay Naval Station.

Stricken from the Navy Directory 16 February 2002, she was scrapped 9 May 2005.
