= USS Weepoose =

US Navy patrol vessel

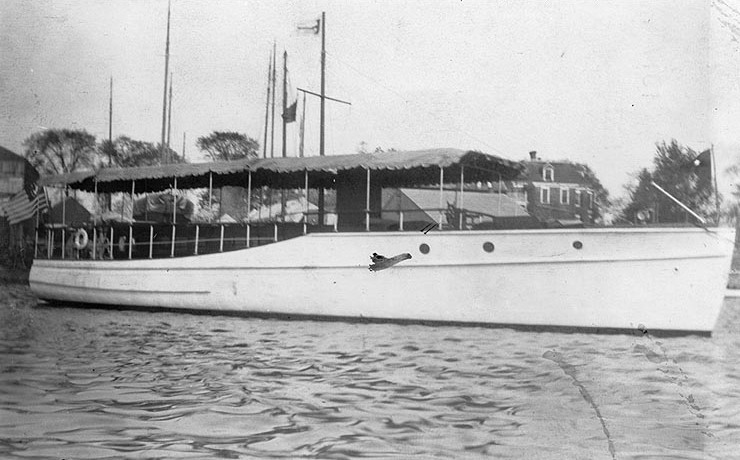
- Weepoose as a private motorboat sometime between 1911 and 1917.

History

United States
- Name: USS Weepoose
- Namesake: Previous name retained
- Builder: Salisbury Marine Construction Company, Salisbury, Maryland
- Completed: 1911
- Acquired: 2 July 1917
- Commissioned: 22 October 1917
- Fate: Transferred to Department of Agriculture 28 September 1920
- Notes: Operated as private motorboat Weepoose 1911-1917

General characteristics
- Type: Patrol vessel
- Tonnage: 24 gross register tons
- Length: 60 ft 0 in (18.29 m)
- Beam: 12 ft 3 in (3.73 m)
- Draft: 3 ft 6 in (1.07 m) mean
- Propulsion: Steam engine
- Speed: 10.0 knots
- Complement: 6
- Armament: 1 × 1-pounder gun; 1 × machine gun

USS Weepoose (SP-405) was a United States Navy patrol vessel in commission from 1917 to ca. 1918–1920.

Weepoose was built as a private motorboat of the same name in 1911 by the Salisbury Marine Construction Company at Salisbury, Maryland. On 2 July 1917, the U.S. Navy acquired her from her owner, C. S. Thorne, for use as a section patrol vessel during World War I. She was commissioned as USS Weepoose (SP-405) on 22 October 1917.

Assigned to the 3rd Naval District, Weepoose carried out submarine net patrols, but little else is known of her naval career. It is known that on 1 February 1918 she was based at Rosebank, Staten Island, New York.

Weepoose was transferred to the United States Department of Agriculture on 28 September 1920.
