= USS White Plains =

Two ships of the United States Navy have been named USS White Plains, after the Battle of White Plains during the American Revolutionary War.

- The first USS White Plains (CVE-66) was an escort carrier in service from 1943 to 1946, and notable for action in the Battle off Samar.
- The second USS White Plains (AFS-4) was a combat stores ship in service from 1968 to 1995.
