= USS Waukegan =

History

United States
- Name: Waukegan
- Builder: National Steel and Shipbuilding Co.
- Acquired: September 1964 (U.S. Navy)
- In service: 1954
- Out of service: 1975
- Stricken: September 1975
- Fate: Sold, Navy sale, 1 June 1976
- Notes: Hull number: YTM-755

General characteristics
- Class & type: Chicopee-class medium yard tug
- Length: 107 ft (33 m)
- Beam: 27 ft (8.2 m)
- Draft: 12 ft (3.7 m)
- Propulsion: Diesel engine, single screw
- Speed: 12 knots (22 km/h; 14 mph)
- Complement: 16

USS Waukegan (YTM-755), was a medium harbor tug that was acquired by the United States Navy in September 1964 from the United States Army for which she had served as LT-1968. Named Waukegan and given the hull number YTM-755, she was assigned to the 10th Naval District at San Juan, Puerto Rico. The tug was based there for her entire 11-year naval career, serving ships in the 10th Naval District. In September 1975, she was placed out of service; and her name was struck from the Navy list. She was subsequently disposed of by sale. Her current status is unknown.

== Ship awards ==
- National Defense Service Medal
