= USS Wawasee =

Tugboat of the United States Navy

History

United States
- Name: USS Wawasee (YTM-367)
- Builder: Consolidated Shipbuilding Corporation, Morris Heights, New York
- Laid down: 24 April 1944
- Launched: 10 June 1944
- In service: 27 October 1944
- Out of service: May 1974
- Reclassified: District Harbor Tug, Medium YTM-367, February 1962
- Stricken: May 1974
- Fate: Sold for scrapping in May 1974

General characteristics
- Class & type: Sassaba-class harbor tug
- Displacement: 260 tons; 345 tons (full)
- Length: 100 ft 0 in (30.48 m)
- Beam: 25 ft 0 in (7.62 m)
- Draft: 9 ft 7 in (2.92 m) (full)
- Speed: 12 knots (22 km/h; 14 mph)
- Complement: 14
- Armament: 2 x 0.5 in (12.7 mm) machine guns

USS Wawasee (YTM-367) was laid down on 24 April 1944 at Morris Heights, N.Y., by the Consolidated Shipbuilding Corp.; reclassified YTB-367 on 15 May 1944; launched on 10 June 1944; and completed and placed in service on 27 October 1944.

Wawasee—reclassified as YTM-367 in February 1962—operated at Boston, Massachusetts, performing tug and tow services in the waters of the 1st Naval District for her entire career. She was taken out of service and struck from the Navy list in May 1974.
