= USS Waxsaw =

USS Waxsaw was the name of two ships in the United States Navy. The name is taken from a Native American tribe more commonly referred to as the Waxhaws.

- USS Waxsaw (1865) was a single-turreted, twin-screw monitor, was renamed Niobe late in her career.
- USS Waxsaw (AN-91), a net laying ship, was commissioned in 1945.
