= USS Widgeon =

USS Widgeon was the name of more than one vessel of the U.S. Navy:

- USS Widgeon (AM-22), a minesweeper in commission from 1918 to 1922 and from 1923 to 1947 that saw service in World War I and World War II.
- USS Widgeon (AMS-208), a minesweeper in commission from 1955 to 1969 that saw service in the Vietnam War.

== See also ==
- USS Edithena (SP-624), which served as the fishery patrol boat Widgeon in the fleets of the United States Bureau of Fisheries and Fish and Wildlife Service from 1919 to 1944
