= USS Willoughby (SP-2129) =

Patrol vessel of the United States Navy

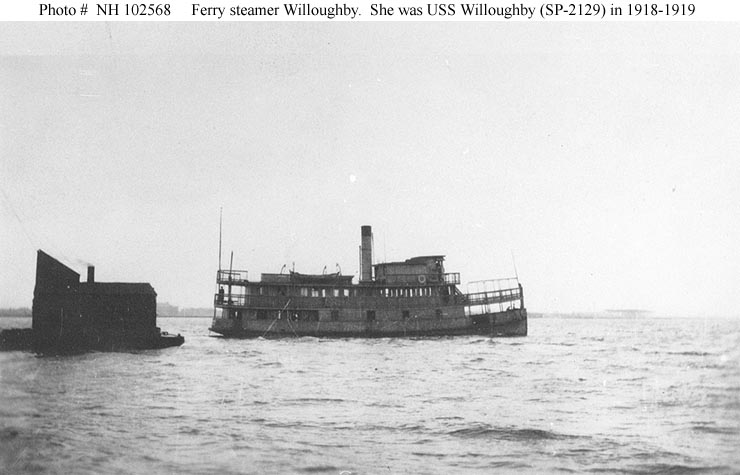
- USS Willoughby (SP-2129)Ferry steamer SS Willoughby, which served in the United States Navy as patrol vessel USS Willoughby (SP-2129) in 1918-1919

History

United States
- Name: USS Willoughby
- Namesake: Willoughby Bay, an estuary of Hampton Roads at Norfolk, Virginia (previous name retained)
- Completed: 1903
- Commissioned: 8 February 1918
- Decommissioned: 26 September 1919
- Fate: Returned to owner 26 September 1919
- Notes: Operated as commercial ferry SS Augustus J. Phillips and SS Willoughby 1903-1918 and SS Willoughby from 1919

General characteristics
- Type: Patrol vessel
- Tonnage: 147 Gross register tons
- Length: 104 ft 5 in (31.83 m)
- Beam: 22 ft 0 in (6.71 m)
- Draft: 6 ft 8 in (2.03 m) dph
- Propulsion: Steam
- Complement: 17

The first USS Willoughby (SP-2129) was a patrol vessel that served in the United States Navy from 1918 to 1919.

Willoughby was built as the wooden-hulled ferry steamer SS Augustus J. Phillips in 1903 at South Rondout, New York. Her name had been changed to SS Willoughby by the time she was chartered by the U.S. Navy from the Chesapeake Ferry Company of Portsmouth, Virginia, for local district patrol duties during World War I. She was assigned the Navy classification SP-2129 and commissioned as USS Willoughby on 8 February 1918.

Willoughby operated in the 5th Naval District for the duration of World War I and ultimately was decommissioned and returned to her pre-war owners on 26 September 1919.
