= Wahpeton (YTM-527) =

Tugboat of the United States Navy

History

United States
- Name: Wahpeton
- Namesake: The Sisseton-Wahpeton Sioux Tribe, a branch of the Dakota or Sioux.
- Builder: Gibbs Gas Engine Company, Inc., Jacksonville, Florida
- Laid down: 23 June 1945
- Launched: 29 September 1945
- Sponsored by: Mrs. Emery H. Price
- Completed: 2 January 1946
- In service: August 1946
- Reclassified: Medium harbor tug (YTM-527) in February 1962
- Stricken: 31 December 1985
- Notes: One of two U.S. Navy tugs named Wahpeton in service between 1968 and 1974, the other being Wahpeton (YTB-757)

General characteristics
- Class & type: Sassaba-class yard tug
- Displacement: 238 tons; 310 tons (full)
- Length: 101 ft 0 in (30.78 m)
- Beam: 28 ft 0 in (8.53 m)
- Draft: 11 ft 0 in (3.35 m)
- Propulsion: Diesel-Electric, single propeller. Two E568 Detroit Diesel generators powered a single 500Hp electric motor.
- Speed: 12 knots (22 km/h; 14 mph)
- Complement: 10

The first Wahpeton (YTB-527), later YTM-527, was a harbor tug in commission from 1946 through at least 1981.

Wahpeton was laid down on 23 June 1945 at Jacksonville, Florida, by the Gibbs Gas Engine Company, Inc. She was launched on 29 September 1945, sponsored by Mrs. Emery H. Price, the wife of Congressman Emery H. Price, a member of the U.S. House Naval Affairs Committee, and was completed on 2 January 1946.

Listed as "out of service" with the Texas group of the National Defense Reserve Fleet as of March 1946, Wahpeton was activated in August 1946. She was assigned to the 6th Naval District and placed in service at Charleston, South Carolina, soon thereafter. She was reclassified as a medium harbor tug and redesignated YTM-527 in February 1962.

From 1968 until 1974, she was one of two U.S. Navy tugs in service as Wahpeton, the other being tug Wahpeton (YTM-757).

Wahpeton was stricken from the Navy List on 31 December 1985.
