= USS Yucca (IX-214) =

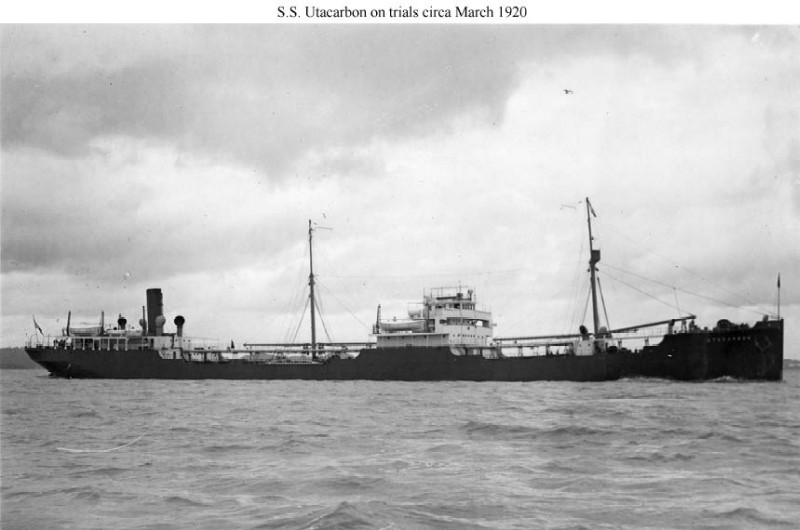
- SS Utacarbon on trials ca. 25 March 1920. She would serve as USS Yucca in 1945–1946.

History

United States
- Name: USS Yucca
- Builder: Bethlehem Steel Company, Alameda, California
- Launched: 31 July 1919
- Completed: 1920
- Acquired: February 1945
- Commissioned: 9 July 1945
- Decommissioned: 19 February 1946
- Renamed: 9 March 1945
- Stricken: 12 March 1946
- Fate: Sold for scrapping 24 January 1947
- Notes: Built as commercial tanker SS Utacarbon

General characteristics
- Type: Tanker
- Displacement: 10,749 tons
- Length: 453 ft (138 m)
- Beam: 56 ft (17 m)
- Propulsion: Steam engines
- Speed: 10 knots
- Complement: 70
- Armament: 1 × 4 in (100 mm) gun; 1 × 3 in (76 mm) gun; 8 × 20 mm antiaircraft guns

The second USS Yucca (IX-214) was a tanker that served in the United States Navy from 1945 to 1946.

Yucca was constructed in 1920 by the Bethlehem Steel Company at Alameda, California, as the commercial tanker SS Utacarbon. The U.S. Navy acquired her from the War Shipping Administration for World War II service in February 1945, renamed her Yucca on 9 March 1945, converted her to naval use at San Francisco, California, and placed her in commission as USS Yucca (IX-214) on 9 July 1945.

Yucca arrived at Pearl Harbor, Hawaii, in late August 1945, just after the end of World War II, and departed that port on her way to duty in the Central Pacific on 3 September 1945. She stopped at Ulithi Atoll in the western Caroline Islands on 22 September 1945 but continued her voyage that same day, arriving at Buckner Bay, Okinawa, on 29 September 1945. She arrived in Nagoya, Japan on 6 October 1945, but returned to the Ryukyu Islands later that month.

On 11 November 1945, the tanker began her voyage back to the United States. Steaming via Eniwetok in the Marshall Islands and Pearl Harbor, she arrived in the Panama Canal Zone on January 6, 1946, transited the Panama Canal, and departed the canal's eastern terminus on 8 January 1946. She arrived in Mobile, Alabama, on 15 January 1946 and changed operational control to the Commandant, 8th Naval District, for inactivation preparations.

Yucca was decommissioned at Mobile on 19 February 1946 and returned to the War Shipping Administration for disposal. Her name was struck from the Navy List on 12 March 1946, and she was sold on 24 January 1947 to the Pinto Island Metals Company for scrapping.
