= Wapakoneta (YTB-766) =

Tugboat of the United States Navy

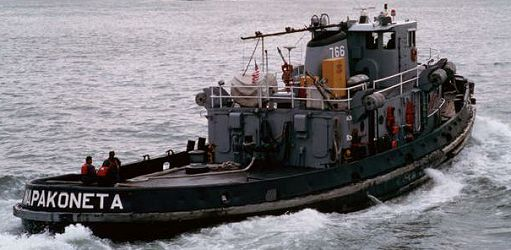
- Wapakoneta (YTB-766)

History

United States
- Namesake: Wapakoneta, Ohio
- Awarded: 7 December 1961
- Builder: Southern Shipbuilding Company, Slidell, Louisiana
- Laid down: 1 August 1962
- Launched: 11 June 1963
- Acquired: 25 July 1963
- Stricken: 16 April 2001
- Identification: IMO number: 8980804
- Fate: Sold 16 July 2001

General characteristics
- Class & type: Natick-class large harbor tug
- Displacement: 283 long tons (288 t) (light); 356 long tons (362 t) (full)
- Length: 109 ft 0 in (33.22 m)
- Beam: 31 ft 0 in (9.45 m)
- Draft: 14 ft 0 in (4.27 m)
- Installed power: 2000 horsepower (1.5 MW)
- Propulsion: one diesel engine, one screw
- Speed: 12 knots (14 mph; 22 km/h)
- Complement: 12

Wapakoneta (YTB-766) was a United States Navy Natick-class large harbor tug named for the city of Wapakoneta, Ohio.

== Construction ==
The contract for Wapakoneta was awarded 7 December 1961. She was laid down on 1 August 1962 at Slidell, Louisiana, by Southern Shipbuilding Corporation and launched 11 June 1963.

== Operational history ==
In October 1963, Wapakoneta was placed in service in the 5th Naval District at Norfolk, Virginia. She performed unglamorous, but vital, duties in those waters, providing tug and tow services, pilot assistance, and stand-by waterfront fire protection.

After more than 37 years of service at Norfolk Naval Base, Wapakoneta was stricken from the Navy Directory on 16 April 2001 and was sold on 16 July 2001.
