= Wahpeton (YTM-757) =

Tugboat of the United States Navy

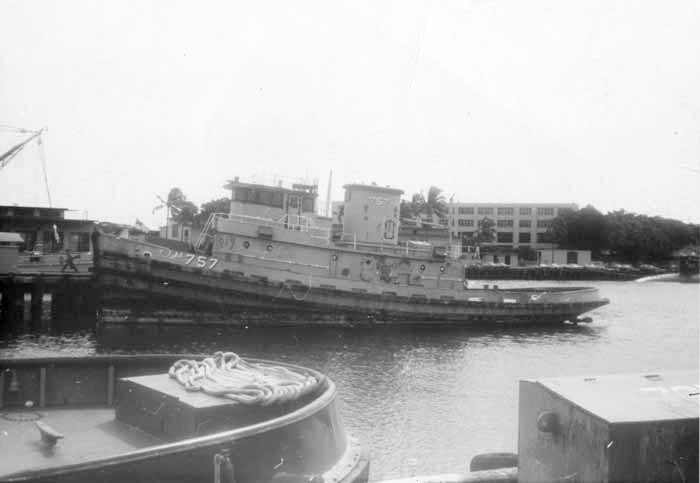
- Wahpeton (YTM-757)

History

United States
- Name: Wahpeton
- Namesake: The Sisseton-Wahpeton Sioux Tribe, a branch of the Dakota or Sioux.
- Acquired: April 1968
- Identification: IMO number: 8424173
- Fate: Sold September 1974; Became commercial tug Lynne
- Notes: One of two U.S. Navy tugs named Wahpeton in service between 1968 and 1974, the other being Wahpeton (YTB-527)

General characteristics
- Class & type: Chicopee-class yard tug
- Displacement: 310 tons (full)
- Length: 107 ft 0 in (32.61 m)
- Beam: 27 ft 0 in (8.23 m)
- Draft: 12 ft 0 in (3.66 m)
- Speed: 12 knots
- Complement: 16

The second Wahpeton (YTM-757) was a yard tug placed in commission in the United States Navy in 1968 and sold in 1974.

The U.S. Navy acquired the tug LT-2084 from the United States Army in April 1968. Placed in service as medium harbor tug Wahpeton and designated YTM-757, she soon thereafter was assigned to the 14th Naval District and served the United States Pacific Fleet.

During her time in U.S. Navy service, she was one of two U.S Navy tugs named Wahpeton, the other being Wahpeton (YTB-527).

Taken out of service in the early 1970s, Wahpeton was struck from the Navy List and sold in September 1974. She became the commercial tug Lynne.

== In popular culture ==
Wahpeton (YTM-757) appeared in Season 4, Episode 23, of Hawaii Five-O (1968 TV series), titled, "Follow the White Brick Road."
