= USS Whippet (SP-89) =

Patrol vessel of the United States Navy

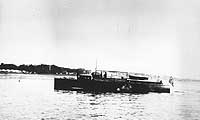
- Whippet as a civilian motorboat in 1917, prior to her U.S. Navy service

History

United States
- Name: USS Whippet
- Namesake: Previous name retained
- Builder: Greenport Basin and Construction Company, Greenport, New York
- Completed: 1917
- Acquired: 9 July 1917
- Commissioned: 24 July 1917
- Decommissioned: 11 January 1919
- Stricken: 11 January 1919
- Fate: Returned to owner 11 January 1919
- Notes: Operated as private motorboat Whippet 1917 and from 1919

General characteristics
- Type: Patrol vessel
- Displacement: 21 tons
- Length: 72 ft (22 m)
- Beam: 12 ft (3.7 m)
- Draft: 3 ft 3 in (0.99 m) aft
- Speed: 23 knots
- Complement: 11
- Armament: 1 × 1-pounder gun; 1 × machine gun

The first USS Whippet (SP-89) was an armed motorboat that served in the United States Navy as a patrol vessel from 1917 to 1919.

Whippet was a civilian motorboat completed in 1917 by Greenport Basin and Construction Company at Greenport on Long Island, New York. On 9 July 1917, the U.S. Navy acquired her from her owner, Mr. O. C. Jennings of New York City, for World War I service as a patrol boat. She was commissioned as USS Whippet (SP-89) on 24 July 1917.

Whippet conducted antisubmarine and coastal defense patrols in the 2nd Naval District in southern New England during World War I.

On 11 January 1919, Whippet was decommissioned. She was stricken from the Navy List and returned to her owner the same day.
