= USS West Bridge =

United States Navy cargo ship

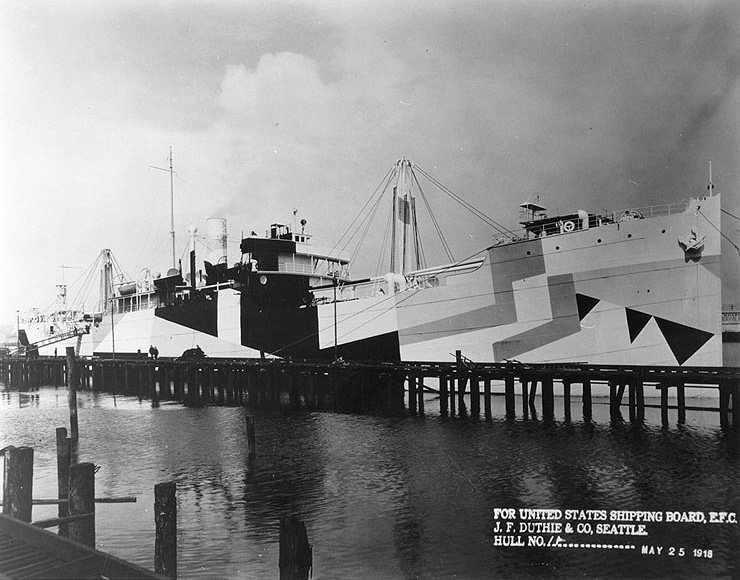
- West Bridge in dazzle camouflage shortly before completion in May 1918

History

United States
- Name: USS West Bridge (ID-2888)
- Builder: J. F. Duthie & Company; Seattle, Washington
- Yard number: 11
- Launched: 24 April 1918
- Completed: 26 May 1918
- Acquired: 26 May 1918
- Commissioned: 26 May 1918
- Decommissioned: 1 December 1919
- Identification: United States official number: 216348; Code Letters LKRQ (1919–34); Code letters KJOO (1934–45)
- Fate: Returned to United States Shipping Board

History
- Name: 1919–1929: West Bridge; 1929–1939: Barbara Cates; 1939–1945: Pan Gulf; 1945–1966: Lermontov (Russian: Лермонтов)
- Namesake: 1945: Mikhail Lermontov
- Owner: 1919: U.S. Shipping Board; 1929: Sudden & Christenson; 1938: Waterman; 1939: Pan Atlantic; 1943: War Shipping Administration; 1945: Soviet Union
- Operator: 1945: FESCO; 1950: Black Sea Shipping Co.
- Port of registry: 1919: (United States) Seattle; 1929: San Francisco; 1938: Mobile, Alabama; 1940: Wilmington, Delaware; 1944: New York; 1945: Soviet Union
- Fate: Scrapped at Split, Yugoslavia, 29 June 1966

General characteristics
- Type: Cargo ship
- Tonnage: 5,799 GRT; 8,594 LT DWT
- Displacement: 12,200 long tons (12,400 t)
- Length: 409 ft 5 in (124.79 m) (pp); 423 ft 9 in (129.16 m) (oa)
- Beam: 54 ft 0 in (16.46 m)
- Draft: 24 ft 1 in (7.34 m) (mean)
- Depth of hold: 29 ft 9 in (9.07 m)
- Propulsion: 1 × triple-expansion steam engine, 2,500 hp (1,900 kW)
- Speed: 10.5 knots (19.4 km/h)
- Complement: 88 (as USS West Bridge)
- Armament: World War I: 1 × 4-inch (102 mm) gun; 1 × 3-inch (76 mm) gun

USS West Bridge (ID-2888) was a Design 1013 cargo ship in the United States Navy during World War I. She was begun as War Topaz for the British Government but was completed as West Bridge (though referred to in some publications under the spelling Westbridge). After being decommissioned from the Navy, the ship returned to civilian service as West Bridge, but was renamed Barbara Cates, and Pan Gulf over the course of her commercial career under American registry.

West Bridge was one of the West ships, a series of steel-hulled cargo ships built for the United States Shipping Board (USSB) on the West Coast of the United States. She was launched in April 1918 and delivered to the U.S. Navy upon completion in May. After commissioning, USS West Bridge sailed from the Pacific Northwest to the East Coast of the United States and joined a convoy of cargo ships headed to France in August. After the ship suffered an engine breakdown at sea the convoy was attacked by two German submarines and West Bridge was torpedoed and abandoned. A salvage crew from the American destroyer Smith boarded her the following day, and, working with four tugs dispatched from France, successfully brought the ship into port. Four men received the Navy Cross for their efforts.

After seven months of repair, West Bridge resumed Navy service until her December 1919 decommissioning and return to the USSB. She was laid up from 1922 to 1929, when she was sold for service on an intercoastal cargo service under the name Barbara Cates. By 1938, the ship had been renamed Pan Gulf for service with a subsidiary of the Waterman Steamship Company. During World War II, Pan Gulf made nine round trips between the United States and the United Kingdom without incident in wartime convoys. She also sailed between New York and ports on the Gulf Coast and in the Caribbean. In May 1945, she was transferred to the Soviet Union under Lend-Lease. Renamed Lermontov, the ship sailed in support of the war and continued in civilian service for the Soviets until 1966, when she was scrapped at Split, Yugoslavia.

== Design and construction ==
To replace shipping tonnage lost to German submarines during World War I, the British Shipping Controller sought newly built ships from American shipyards. As part of 700,000 long tons (710,000 t) of shipping which had been ordered by March 1917, an order for nine vessels of 8,800 long tons deadweight (DWT) was placed with J. F. Duthie & Company of Seattle. (Note: In addition to War Topaz, the other eight ships built by the Duthie company were War Leopard, War General, War Emerald, War Sun, War Moon, War Fort, War Disk, and War Ruby. See: McKellar, pp. 283–84.) Because the United States had not yet entered World War I, the Shipping Controller could not order the ships directly and so, to skirt neutrality laws, these orders were made on the government's behalf by the Cunard Steamship Company. The Duthie company laid down the keel of War Topaz as the eleventh ship begun at their shipyard.

On 6 August 1917, the Emergency Fleet Corporation—an entity created by the USSB shortly after the United States entered the war on 6 April and tasked with overseeing U.S. shipbuilding—requisitioned most ships under construction in the United States; included among those was War Topaz. By the time of her 24 April 1918 launch, the ship had been renamed West Bridge, becoming one of the West ships, cargo ships of similar size and design built by several shipyards on the West Coast of the United States. Just a bit over one month later, on 26 May, the finished West Bridge was delivered to the United States Navy.

As completed, the steel-hulled three-hold ship was 409 feet 5 inches (124.79 m) long (between perpendiculars), 54 feet (16.5 m) abeam, and drew 24 feet 1 inch (7.34 m). West Bridge had a displacement of 12,200 long tons (12,400 t), and her 29-foot-9-inch (9.07 m) depth of hold allowed the ship to be rated at 5,799 gross register tons (GRT). The ship was powered by a single steam turbine engine of 2,500 horsepower (1,900 kW), built by the De Laval Steam Turbine Company in Trenton, New Jersey. allowing the single screw propeller to move the ship at up 11 knots (20 km/h). For her U.S. Navy service in World War I, West Bridge was equipped with one 4-inch (102 mm) and one 3-inch (76 mm) gun.

== Military career ==
USS West Bridge (ID-2888) was commissioned into the Naval Overseas Transportation Service (NOTS) at the Puget Sound Navy Yard on 26 May. West Bridge took on an initial load of flour and departed 10 June for the East Coast. (Note: The West ships, to avoid sailing empty to the East Coast, loaded grain products intended for the United Kingdom, France, and Italy and sailed to Europe without unloading or transferring their cargo. This avoided extra handling of the cargo and the United States Shipping Board, by prior arrangement, then received an equivalent amount of cargo space in foreign ships for other American cargoes. See: Crowell and Wilson, pp. 358–59.) Along the way, the ship developed troubles with her engine, which required putting in at Balboa in the Panama Canal Zone for repairs. Getting underway again on 4 July, West Bridge sailed for New York, arriving on 16 July.

After refueling at New York, West Bridge joined Convoy HB-8 bound for France, sailing on 1 August in company with Navy cargo ship West Alsek, United States Army transport Montanan, and 13 others. Escorted by armed yacht Noma, destroyers Burrows and Smith, and French cruiser Marseillaise, the convoy was 500 nautical miles (900 km) west of its destination of Le Verdon-sur-Mer by the end of the day on 15 August.

=== Torpedo attack ===
At 17:40, West Bridge's engine broke down once again and her crew was unable to repair it. Falling off the back of the convoy and adrift, she signaled Marseillaise to request a tow. At sundown, shortly before 18:00, Montanan—still in the convoy, which was by now 4 nautical miles (7.4 km) ahead of West Bridge—was hit by one of three torpedoes launched by German submarine U-90. Montanan began to settle and was quickly abandoned. On West Bridge, Lieutenant Commander Hawkins realized the potential for another submarine attack and ordered his crew to general quarters and reduced the number of men in the mechanical spaces below decks. Noma sailed back to West Bridge, ordered the freighter to extinguish her lights, and stood by. At nearly the same time, U-107 approached and launched two torpedoes at the stationary cargo ship, scoring hits with both. The first struck near the No. 3 cargo hold forward, destroying the cargo ship's wireless, the second amidships near the engine room. West Bridge immediately began listing to starboard, and Hawkins ordered the crew to abandon ship. He and two crewmen remained behind until he felt sure that everyone else had departed. By the time the three left the stricken ship, water was up to the gunwales and lapping at the well deck.

Immediately after the attack, Noma sped off to depth charge the submarine while sending an SOS for West Bridge. Destroyer Burrows arrived to take on West Bridge's survivors, who had situated themselves about a mile (2 km) from the still-floating ship. After the survivors boarded the destroyer, a head count revealed that four men were missing, but also turned up two female stowaways.

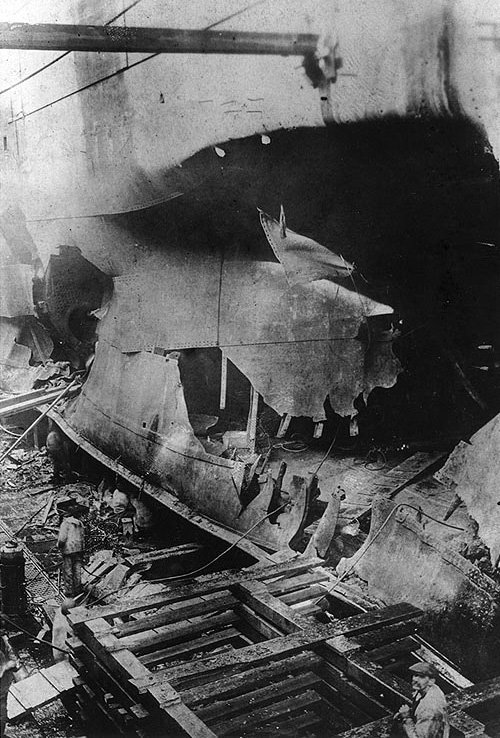
Torpedo damage to USS West Bridge seen in a French drydock c. 1918. One of the ship's boilers is visible in the left rear.

By the morning of 16 August, both Montanan and West Bridge were still afloat, with decks awash. Attempts to get Montanan under tow failed, and she foundered later in the morning. Meanwhile, Hawkins and his executive officer were taken by boat to West Bridge to assess her situation. After boarding the ship and finding three cargo holds and her engineering spaces completely flooded, Hawkins advised Burrows' captain that the situation was hopeless and he would only be endangering his ship, crew, and the West Bridge survivors by remaining alongside. Consequently, Burrows departed for Brest, France, leaving the destroyer Smith to stand by the stricken vessel.

A volunteer work and salvage party from Smith, led by Lieutenant Richard L. Conolly, and which included Chief Boatswain's Mate John Henry Caudell, Carpenter's Mate, 3rd class Walter Homer Todd, and Coxwain John Robert Nuttall, boarded West Bridge and awaited four tugs which had been dispatched from Brest: the U.S. Navy Favorite, two French tugs, and one British tug. Over the course of the next five days, the tugs, joined by patrol yacht Isabel, slowly towed West Bridge to the French coast, eventually arriving at Brest. The ship was towed over 400 nautical miles (740 km) with only 1% buoyancy remaining. Conolly, Caudell, Todd, and Nuttall were each awarded the Navy Cross for their efforts in saving the ship; W. W. Wotherspoon, the fleet salvage officer on Favorite, was also honored with a Navy Cross, in part for his salvage efforts for West Bridge. (Note: In addition to his salvage work on West Bridge, Wotherspoon was honored for his efforts for Westward Ho, Mount Vernon, Conner, and Murray. See: Stringer, p. 147.)

The extent of the damage and the condition of West Bridge led to some erroneous reports of her loss. News articles on 24 August in both The New York Times and the Chicago Daily Tribune reported the sinking, and the mistaken information was recorded by authors Benedict Crowell and Robert Forrest Wilson in their work The Road to France: The Transportation of Troops and Military Supplies, 1917–1918.

After West Bridge underwent seven months of repairs, the ship resumed service with the NOTS through 1 December 1919, at which time she was decommissioned and handed over to the USSB.

== Interwar years ==
The United States Official Number 216348 and Code Letters LKRQ were allocated to the ship. Little is known about West Bridge's activities after her return to the USSB in 1919, but in June 1922 she was laid up in Philadelphia, where she remained for almost seven years. In March 1929, the USSB approved the sale of West Bridge for $57,000 to the Sudden & Christenson of San Francisco. Before re-entering service her steam turbine machinery was removed and replaced by a triple-expansion steam engine built by the Hooven, Owens, & Rentschler Company of Hamilton, Ohio. The engine, with cylinders of 24 1/2, 41 1/2, and 72 inches (62, 105, and 180 cm) diameter with a 48-inch (120 cm) stroke, was capable of generating up to 2,500 horsepower (1,900 kW), allowing a speed of 10.5 knots (19.4 km/h). By May, the ship had been renamed Barbara Cates and was slated for service on the intercoastal freight service of their Arrow Line, which sailed to the Pacific coast from Baltimore, Norfolk, Virginia, Savannah, Georgia and Jacksonville, Florida. The addition of Barbara Cates and other ships purchased around the same time allowed the Arrow Line to increase its sailings from fortnightly to once every ten days. Barbara Cates' nine years with the Arrow Line were uneventful.

In 1934, her Code Letters were changed to KJOO. By October 1938, the ship had been renamed Pan Gulf to reflect the naming style of her new owners, the Pan-Atlantic Steamship Company, a subsidiary of Waterman Steamship Company. The Pan-Atlantic Line sailed in coastal service along the Atlantic and Gulf coasts, and it is likely that Pan Gulf called at typical Pan-Atlantic ports such as Baltimore, Miami, Tampa, New Orleans, Philadelphia, New York, and Boston during this time.

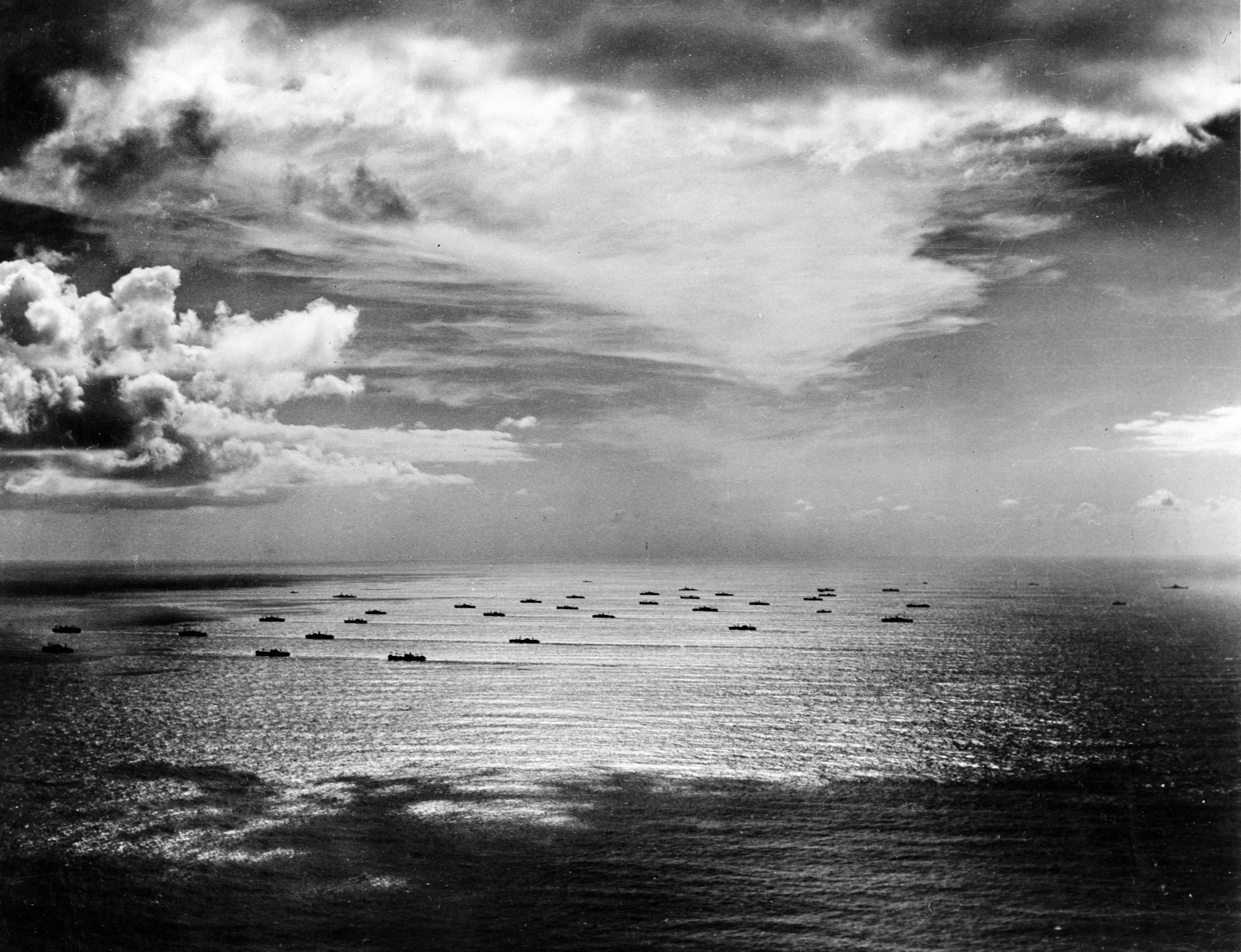
SS Pan Gulf sailed in 18 transatlantic convoys, like this typical one, seen in 1942.

In October 1941, The Christian Science Monitor reported that Pan Gulf had become stuck in the mud off Governors Island after her crew misjudged how far to back out of her berth at the Army base there. The first, unsuccessful attempt to free Pan Gulf involved eight tugs, but the ship did not budge. The newspaper, which had also reported that there was no apparent damage to Pan Gulf in the grounding, carried no further reports on the ship.

== World War II and later career ==
After the United States entered World War II, Pan Gulf frequently sailed in convoys on the North Atlantic, as well as some in the Caribbean and the Gulf of Mexico. Between April and September 1942, Pan Gulf made two roundtrips from the U.S. to Liverpool. In September, the cargo ship sailed from New York to the Caribbean to take on a load of bauxite in early November, and then sailed on to Galveston, Texas, before returning to New York in mid-February 1943.

In late February, Pan Gulf began the first of a further seven roundtrips to the United Kingdom over the next 21 months, when she sailed from New York in Convoy HX 228 for Halifax. In July, the United States Maritime Commission (USMC) purchased Pan Gulf from the Pan-Atlantic Line, overpaying her value by 16 times, according to Senator George Aiken (R–VT).

On 5 May 1945, the USMC turned over Pan Gulf to the Far East Shipping Company (FESCO) of the Soviet Union under Lend-Lease; FESCO renamed the ship Lermontov (Russian: Лермонтов, IPA: [ˈlʲerməntəf]) after the poet Mikhail Lermontov. The Soviets armed the ship with a 4-inch (100 mm) gun and other weapons and employed her in cargo duties in support of the war.

At war's end, Lermontov remained with FESCO through 1950. At that time she was transferred to the Black Sea Shipping Company, with which she remained into the 1960s. Lermontov was delivered to shipbreakers Brodospas in Split, Yugoslavia on 26 June 1966.

== Bibliography ==
- Crowell, Benedict; Robert Forrest Wilson (1921). The Road to France: The Transportation of Troops and Military Supplies, 1917–1918. How America Went to War: An Account From Official Sources of the Nation's War Activities, 1917–1920. New Haven: Yale University Press. OCLC 18696066.
- de la Pedraja Tomán, René (1994). "Waterman Steamship Corporation". A Historical Dictionary of the U.S. Merchant Marine and Shipping Industry: Since the Introduction of Steam. Westport, Connecticut: Greenwood Press. ISBN 978-0-313-27225-7. OCLC 29311518.
- Lloyd's Register of Shipping (1856). Register of Ships (various editions). London: Lloyd's Register of Shipping.
- Mann, Raymond A. (21 November 2005). "Burrows". Dictionary of American Naval Fighting Ships. Navy Department, Naval History and Heritage Command.
- McKellar, Norman L. (May–June 1962). "Steel Shipbuilding under the U. S. Shipping Board, 1917–1921". The Belgian Shiplover (87). Brussels: Belgian Nautical Research Association: 270–85. OCLC 5887022.
- Mitchell, W H; Sawyer, L A (1968). British Standard Ships of World War 1. Liverpool: Sea Breezes/Journal of Commerce and Shipping Telegraph.
- Naval History & Heritage Command. "West Alsek". Dictionary of American Naval Fighting Ships. Navy Department, Naval History & Heritage Command.
- Naval History & Heritage Command. "West Bridge". Dictionary of American Naval Fighting Ships. Navy Department, Naval History & Heritage Command.
- Stringer, Harry R. (1921). The Navy Book of Distinguished Service. Washington, D.C.: Fassett Pub. Co. OCLC 2654351.
