= Noyo =

Noyo can refer to:

- Noyo Harbor, Fort Bragg, California
- Noyo River, California
- Noyo, California, in Mendocino County
- SS Noyo, a number of steamships with this name
- Noyo (genus), a genus within the Helminthoglyptinae subfamily of land snails
