= Azimech =

Azimech may refer to:

- USS Azimech, a U.S. Navy cargo ship
- A historical name for the star Arcturus
- A historical name for the star Spica
