= Arrow Line =

Arrow Line may refer to:

- Arrow (rail service), in Southern California
- A defunct joint venture of the former shipping business Sudden & Christenson Company
