= USS West Alsek =

American cargo ship

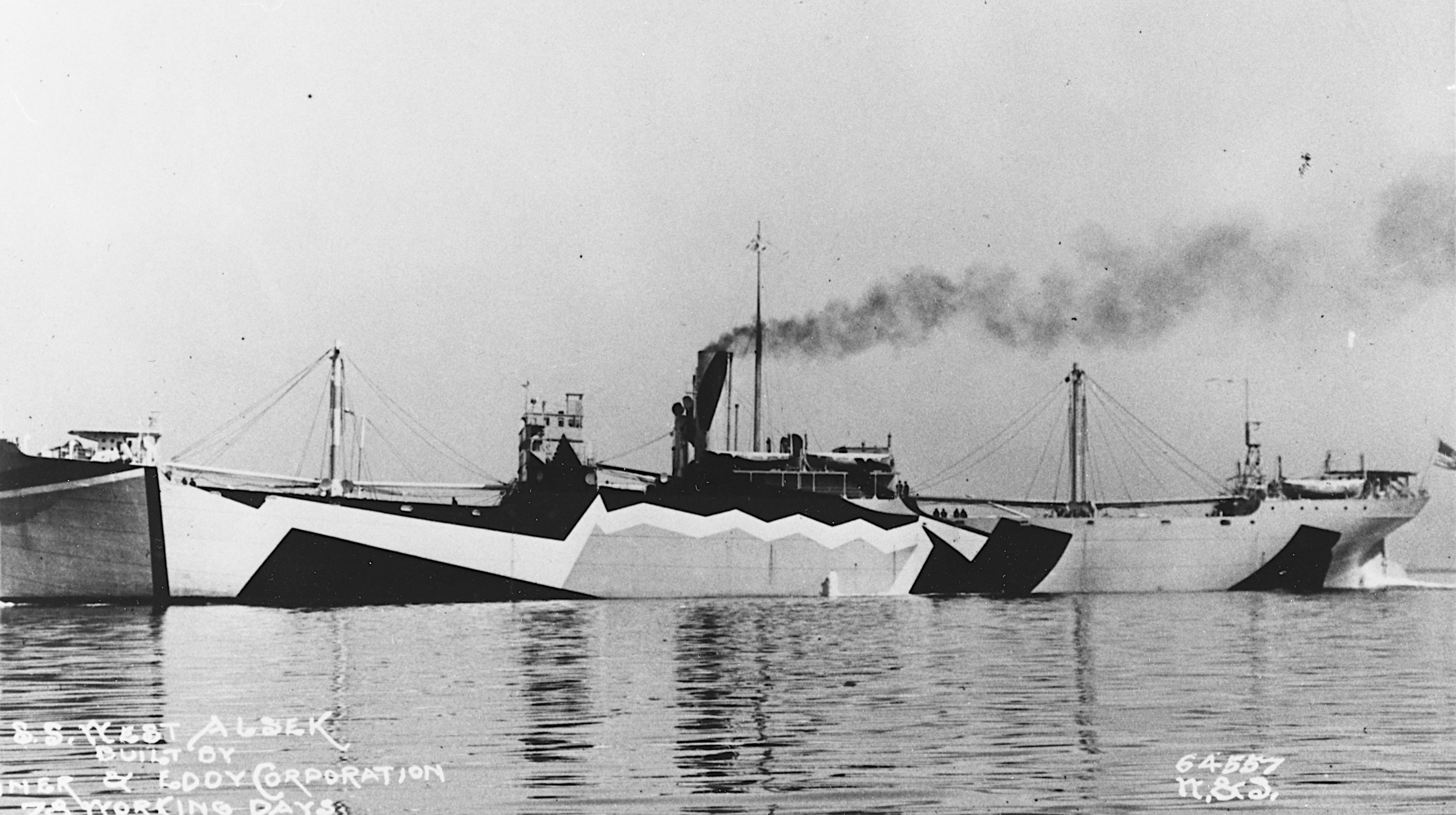
- West Alsek painted in dazzle camouflage during sea trials on 4 June 1918

History

United States
- Name: West Alsek
- Namesake: Alsek River, Alaska
- Owner: United States Shipping Board
- Operator: 1918–1919: United States Navy, as USS West Alsek; 1929: Oriole Line
- Builder: Skinner & Eddy; Seattle, Washington
- Yard number: 22
- Launched: 4 May 1918
- Completed: May 1918
- Commissioned: 4 June 1918
- Decommissioned: 27 January 1919
- Identification: Official number: 216415
- Fate: Scrapped, 1933

General characteristics
- Type: Design 1013 ship
- Tonnage: 5,637 GRT
- Displacement: 12,226 t
- Length: 409 ft 5 in (124.79 m) (LPP); 423 ft 9 in (129.16 m) (overall)
- Beam: 54 ft 0 in (16.46 m)
- Draft: 29 ft 9 in (9.07 m)
- Propulsion: 1 triple-expansion steam engine, 2,700 hp (2,000 kW)
- Speed: 10.5 knots (19.4 km/h) (1918)
- Complement: 99
- Armament: 1 × 4-inch (100 mm) gun; 1 × 6-pounder (2.7 kg) gun

USS West Alsek (ID-3119) was a cargo ship in the United States Navy during World War I. She had been built as SS West Alsek for the United States Shipping Board (USSB) as part of the West boats, cargo ships built on the West Coast of the United States. She sailed on two voyages for the U.S. Navy before she was decommissioned after the Armistice.

West Alsek was selected for a test program by the addition of coal pulverizers—units that crushed coal and mixed it with air for injection into the boilers. She became the first steamship to cross the Atlantic ocean depending solely on pulverized coal. Test results showed that she sailed faster and used less coal than before the conversion. West Alsek was later abandoned by the USSB and scrapped in 1933.

== Design and construction ==
The West ships were cargo ships of similar size and design built by several shipyards on the West Coast of the United States for the United States Shipping Board (USSB) for emergency use during World War I. All were given names that began with the word West, like West Alsek, named, in part, after the Alsek River in Alaska. West Alsek was one of some 24 West ships built by Skinner & Eddy of Seattle, Washington.

West Alsek (Skinner & Eddy No. 22, USSB No. 87) was launched on 4 May 1918 and delivered to the United States Navy upon completion later in the month. West Alsek was built in a total of 78 working days, 92 calendar days, and was tied with three other ships for tenth place on a list of the ten fastest constructed ocean-going vessels compiled in 1920. (Note: The other three ships tied for tenth-fastest were West Apaum and West Gotomska—both also constructed by Skinner & Eddy, and Lake Gardner. See: Hurley, p. 93.) Skinner & Eddy received a $25,000 bonus for completing the ship early.

The ship was 5,637 gross register tons (GRT), and was 409 feet 5 inches (124.79 m) long (between perpendiculars) and 54 feet (16.5 m) abeam. West Alsek had a steel hull and a mean draft of 24 feet 2 inches (7.37 m). She displaced 12,226 t, and had a deadweight tonnage of 8,529 DWT. The ship had a single triple-expansion steam engine powered by three coal-fired boilers that generated 2,700 horsepower (2,000 kW) and drove her single screw propeller, and moved the ship at a 10.5-knot (19.4 km/h) pace.

== Military career ==
USS West Alsek (ID-3119) was commissioned into the Naval Overseas Transportation Service (NOTS) on 4 June. West Alsek took on an initial load of 7,067 tons of flour and departed the Pacific Northwest on 15 June. After transiting the Panama Canal, she reached New York on 16 July. (Note: Many West ships, to avoid sailing empty to the East Coast, loaded grain products intended for the United Kingdom, France, and Italy, sailed to Europe without unloading or transferring their cargo, which avoided extra handling of the cargo. The United States Shipping Board, by prior arrangement, received an equivalent amount of cargo space in foreign ships for other American cargos. See: Crowell and Wilson, pp. 358–59.) On 1 August, West Alsek joined Convoy HB-8 with West Bridge, United States Army cargo transport Montanan, and 13 other ships for France.

Escorted by armed yacht Noma, destroyers Burrows and Smith, and French cruiser Marseillaise, the convoy was some 500 nautical miles (900 km) west of its destination of Le Verdon-sur-Mer by the end of the day on 15 August. At sundown, shortly before 18:00, one of three torpedoes from German submarine U-90 struck Montanan, while another torpedo from U-107 hit West Bridge, which was already adrift with engine trouble. (Note: Montanan and West Bridge remained afloat until the next morning. West Bridge was towed into Brest, France by four tugs; Montanan foundered and sank. See: Naval Historical Center. "West Bridge". DANFS. "Montanan torpedoed; five men are missing". The Atlanta Constitution. 22 August 1918. p. 7.) Meanwhile, West Alsek and the other surviving ships of the convoy continued on and arrived at Verdon-sur-mer on 18 August.

After unloading her cargo of flour and returning to the United States, West Alsek next sailed on 27 October in convoy to Quiberon and Nantes. West Alsek unloaded her cargo in Nantes from 15 November—four days after the Armistice—to 30 December. Sailing for New York on that date, West Alsek arrived there on 19 January 1919. She was decommissioning on 27 January and returned to the USSB.

== Civilian career ==
Little is known about West Alsek's subsequent civilian career until early 1929. In February of that year, West Alsek, still under USSB ownership, was selected for the addition of pulverized coal-fired boilers for testing purposes. Coal pulverizers would take coal—often cheaper, inferior grades normally unsuitable for marine use—and grind them into coal dust. This dust would then be mixed with air and automatically injected into the boilers without the need for hand-feeding. West Alsek entered the Todd Brooklyn shipyard to undergo the conversion in late February.

Upon completion of the conversion work, West Alsek was taken out for trials over two passes on a 16-nautical-mile (30 km) course on 19 June. Representatives from the USSB, the Navy Department, the United States Coast Guard, the Cunard Line, and Todd and other shipbuilders were on board—some 125 guests in all. The ship cruised at an average of 12.7 knots (23.5 km/h), some 1.5 knots (2.8 km/h) faster than she had ever steamed.

After returning her guests to New York, West Alsek sailed to Baltimore, Maryland, for operation by the Oriole Line. She sailed for Cardiff, becoming the first ship depending only on pulverized coal to cross the Atlantic, (Note: Mercer, an oil-burning ship with coal pulverizing apparatus added, had been the first to cross the Atlantic via pulverized coal, but had crossed with her oil burners available as a backup.) and back to Baltimore on 18 August. Early results showed that in addition to making the transatlantic crossings about 10% faster than she had before, West Alsek used about 30% less coal during the voyage. West Alsek continued to be a test platform for assessing the pulverized coal system during a voyage to Glasgow, her second for the Oriole Line.

No information on West Alsek's career after the coal pulverizing tests is available, but it is known that she was abandoned by the USSB, and scrapped in the fourth quarter of 1933.

== Bibliography ==
- Crowell, Benedict; Robert Forrest Wilson (1921). The Road to France: The Transportation of Troops and Military Supplies, 1917–1918. How America Went to War: An Account From Official Sources of the Nation's War Activities, 1917–1920. New Haven: Yale University Press. OCLC 18696066.
- Hurley, Edward Nash (1920). The New Merchant Marine. New York: Century. OCLC 751444.
- Mann, Raymond A. (21 November 2005). "Burrows". Dictionary of American Naval Fighting Ships. Navy Department, Naval History and Heritage Command.
- Naval Historical Center. "West Alsek". Dictionary of American Naval Fighting Ships. Navy Department, Naval History & Heritage Command.
- Naval Historical Center. "West Bridge". Dictionary of American Naval Fighting Ships. Navy Department, Naval History & Heritage Command.
- United States House of Representatives, Select Committee on U. S. Shipping Board Operations (1920). Shipping Board Operations. Washington, D.C.: Government Printing Office. OCLC 64558341.
