= USS West Apaum =

Cargo ship in the United States Navy

USS West Apaum (ID-3221)
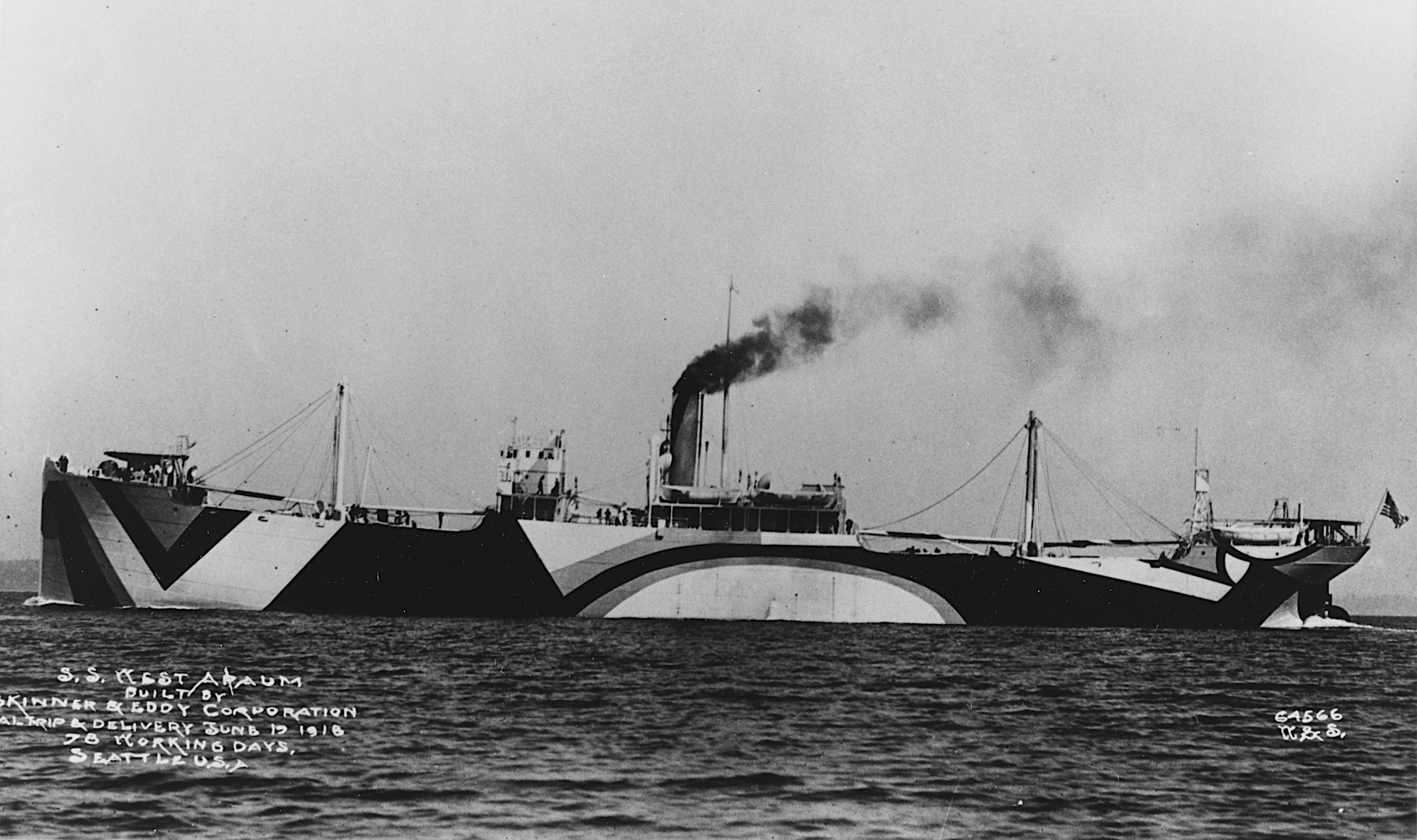
- West Apaum painted in dazzle camouflage during sea trials on 20 June 1918

History

United States
- Owner: United States Shipping Board
- Builder: Skinner & Eddy; Seattle, Washington
- Yard number: 23
- Laid down: 19 March 1918
- Launched: 23 May 1918
- Completed: 19 June 1918
- Acquired: 20 June 1918
- Commissioned: 20 June 1918
- Decommissioned: 25 July 1919
- Identification: Official number: 216500
- Fate: Scrapped, 1933

General characteristics
- Type: Design 1013 ship
- Tonnage: 5,537 GRT
- Displacement: 12,226 t
- Length: 409 ft 5 in (124.79 m) (LPP); 423 ft 9 in (129.16 m) (LOA)
- Beam: 54 ft 0 in (16.46 m)
- Draft: 22 ft 2.25 in (6.7628 m)
- Depth of hold: 29 ft 9 in (9.07 m)
- Propulsion: 1 × triple-expansion steam engine, 2,700 hp (2,000 kW)
- Speed: 10.5 knots (19.4 km/h; 12.1 mph) (1918)
- Complement: 81
- Armament: 1 × 4 in (100 mm) gun; 1 × 3 in (76 mm) gun

USS West Apaum (ID-3221) was a cargo ship in the United States Navy during World War I. She had been built as SS West Apaum for the United States Shipping Board (USSB) as part of the West boats, a series of steel-hulled cargo ships built on the West Coast of the United States.

West Apaum sailed on three voyages for the US Navy, two after the Armistice, before she was decommissioned in July 1919. Though little is available regarding West Apaum's civilian career, it is known that she was sailing on a New York – Rotterdam route in early 1927. By early 1929, West Apaum had been laid up by the USSB, which abandoned her in 1933. The cargo ship was scrapped in the second quarter of that same year.

== Design and construction ==
The "West" ships were cargo ships of similar size and design built by several shipyards on the West Coast of the United States for the United States Shipping Board for emergency use during World War I. All were given names that began with the word "West", like West Apaum, one of some 24 "West" ships built by Skinner & Eddy of Seattle, Washington. (Note: Skinner & Eddy was an emergency shipyard that only operated from 1916 until about 1920.)

West Apaum (Skinner & Eddy No. 23, USSB No. 88) was laid down on 19 March 1918, launched on 23 May, and delivered to the Navy upon completion on 19 June. West Apaum was built in a total of 78 working days, 92 calendar days, and was tied with three other ships for tenth place on a list of the ten fastest constructed ocean-going vessels compiled in 1920. (Note: The other three ships tied for tenth-fastest were West Alsek and West Gotomska—both also constructed by Skinner & Eddy, and Lake Gardner. See: Hurley, p. 93.) Skinner & Eddy received a $25,000 bonus for completing the ship early.

The ship was 5,537 gross register tons (GRT), and was 409 feet 5 inches (124.79 m) long (between perpendiculars) and 54 feet (16.5 m) abeam. West Apaum had a steel hull and a mean draft of 22 feet 2.25 inches (6.7628 m). She displaced 12,226 t, and had a deadweight tonnage of 8,800 DWT. The ship had a single triple-expansion steam engine powered by three coal-fired boilers that drove her single screw propeller, and moved the ship at a 10.5-knot (19.4 km/h) pace.

== Military career ==
USS West Apaum (ID-3221) was commissioned into the Naval Overseas Transportation Service (NOTS) on 20 June 1918.

West Apaum departed Bremerton, Washington, on 27 June for Arica, Chile, to take on a cargo of nitrates for the United States. Sailing from there via the Panama Canal, West Apaum arrived at Savannah, Georgia, on 9 September. From there she sailed for Hampton Roads, Virginia, where she arrived on 10 October. Eight days later, loaded with rolling stock, steel rails, and other general cargo for the United States Army, the cargo ship sailed for France. Delayed at Halifax for repairs to her damaged propeller, West Apaum finally entered the harbor at La Pallice on 22 November, 11 days after the Armistice.

West Apaum unloaded her railroad goods, loaded 2,214 long tons (2,250 t) of Army cargo, and headed for the United States on 13 December. She arrived at Hampton Roads on 3 January 1919. West Apaum made two more voyages to France under Navy control. On her final voyage, she carried airplane materials to France and returned 5,000 long tons (5,100 t) of Army ordnance to New York on 11 July. On 25 July, West Apaum was decommissioned and returned to the USSB.

== Civilian career ==
Little is known about West Apaum's subsequent civilian career. In the first quarter of 1927, it is known that West Apaum was sailing on a New York – Rotterdam route. While in this service, The New York Times, in one of just a few mentions the ship received in contemporary news coverage, reported on the transfer of one of West Apaum's crew members to the United States Lines ocean liner Republic at sea. The crewman had fallen into an open hatchway and had fractured his skull. The two ships, located some 200 nautical miles (370 km; 230 mi) west of New York, came within 1/4 mile (0.40 km) of each other and the injured man was loaded onto a boat from Republic in the heavy seas. The crewman, though successfully transferred to Republic, died several hours later.

By early 1929, West Apaum had been laid up, and was under consideration by the USSB for the installation of pulverized coal-fired boilers for testing purposes, but lost out on the honor to West Alsek. No further information on West Apaum's career is available, but it is known that she was abandoned by the USSB in 1933, and scrapped in the second quarter of that year.

== Bibliography ==
- Crowell, Benedict; Robert Forrest Wilson (1921). The Road to France: The Transportation of Troops and Military Supplies, 1917–1918. How America Went to War: An Account From Official Sources of the Nation's War Activities, 1917–1920. New Haven: Yale University Press. ISBN 1-143-73956-6. OCLC 18696066.
- Hurley, Edward Nash (1920). The New Merchant Marine. New York: Century. OCLC 751444.
- Naval Historical Center. "West Apaum". Dictionary of American Naval Fighting Ships. Navy Department, Naval History and Heritage Command.
- United States House of Representatives, Select Committee on U. S. Shipping Board Operations (1920). Shipping Board Operations. Washington, D.C.: Government Printing Office. OCLC 64558341.
