= United States Twelfth Fleet =

Numbered fleet of the United States Navy

The Twelfth Fleet was a numbered fleet of the United States Navy and was operational from 1 October 1943. The fleet began demobilization in late 1945 and was disestablished in 1946.

== History ==
Twelfth Fleet was established from the U.S. naval forces under Commander Naval Forces Europe, Admiral Harold Stark when, on 9 September 1943 Admiral Ernest King ordered the consolidation of all U.S. naval forces in Europe under a new Twelfth Fleet. The fleet was actually organized earlier under Rear Admiral Alan G. Kirk before all naval forces in Europe were combined. As a command under the United States Naval Forces Europe, the commanders were based from London, England.

Kirk was replaced by Admiral H. Kent Hewitt in August 1945. The fleet had the following commands:

- Task Force 122 under command of Rear Adm. Alan G. Kirk to control operations and training for the cross-Channel assault. Forces from TF 122 made up much of D-Day's Western Naval Task Force.
- Eleventh Amphibious Force
- Landing Craft and Bases, Europe, to receive and control the buildup of landing craft for the invasion.

Task Force 129 was the bombarding force during the Bombardment of Cherbourg.

On 15 April, United States Eighth Fleet was disestablished. All U.S. ships and shore bases in the Mediterranean became part of Task Force 125 of the Twelfth Fleet. NAVNAW however was also retained.

With the escalating Turkish Straits crisis as well as the Greek Civil War, Task Group 125.4 led by the carrier Franklin D. Roosevelt departed Norfolk Naval Base, Virginia, for the eastern Mediterranean on 8 August 1946 under the command of Rear Admiral John H. Cassady. The key event of this deployment was a highly publicized port visit to Piraeus, Greece, on 5 September 1946. According to the late American historian James Chace, this deployment by Task Group 125.4 "symbolized" the true beginning of the Cold War by demonstrating U.S. support of the pro-Western governments of Greece and Turkey in the face of external Soviet pressure and internal Communist insurrections.

Admiral Richard L. Conolly was naval representative to the 1946 Paris Peace Conference. He then commanded the Twelfth Fleet from September 1946 until January 1947.

On 1 November 1946, Mediterranean responsibilities were transferred to United States Naval Forces Mediterranean. On 12 February 1950, Naval Forces Mediterranean became the United States Sixth Fleet.
