= USS Western Star =

Cargo ship of the United States Navy

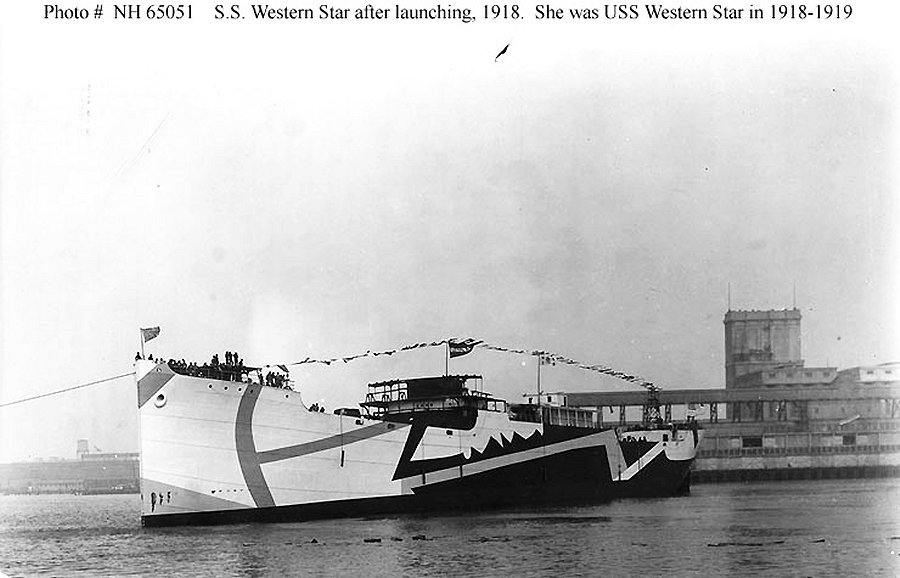
- SS Western Star just after launching at the J. F. Duthie and Company shipyard in Seattle, Washington, on 4 July 1918. She is painted in dazzle camouflage.

History

United States
- Name: USS Western Star
- Builder: J. F. Duthie and Company, Seattle, Washington
- Launched: 4 July 1918
- Completed: late August 1918
- Acquired: 28 August 1918
- Commissioned: 28 August 1918
- Decommissioned: 1 March 1919
- Fate: Returned to U.S. Shipping Board 1 March 1919
- Notes: Abandoned 1933

General characteristics
- Type: Cargo ship
- Tonnage: 5,550 Gross register tons
- Displacement: 12,185 tons
- Length: 423 ft 9 in (129.16 m)
- Beam: 54 ft 0 in (16.46 m)
- Draft: 24 ft 0 in (7.32 m) (mean)
- Depth: 29 ft 9 in (9.07 m)
- Propulsion: One 3,000-ihp (2.237-mW) steam engine, one shaft
- Speed: 12 knots (22 km/h; 14 mph)
- Complement: 98
- Armament: none

USS Western Star (ID-4210) was a cargo ship of the United States Navy that served during World War I and its immediate aftermath.

== Construction and acquisition ==
SS Western Star was laid down as a steel-hulled, single-screw Design 1013 commercial cargo ship by J. F. Duthie and Company in Seattle, Washington, under a United States Shipping Board contract for the French Compagnie Générale. She was launched on 4 July 1918 and completed late in August 1918. Upon her completion, the Shipping Board transferred her immediately on 28 August 1918 to the U.S. Navy for use during World War I. The Navy assigned her the naval registry identification number 4210 and commissioned her at Seattle on 28 August 1918 as USS Western Star (ID-4210).

== Navy career ==
Assigned to the Naval Overseas Transportation Service, Western Star departed Seattle and steamed to Union Bay, British Columbia, Canada, where she arrived on 5 September 1918. She loaded a cargo of coal and underwent a thorough search for bombs and other explosives before departing Union Bay on 15 September 1918 bound for Iquique, Chile. Arriving at Iquique on 13 October 1918, she unloaded her cargo, then moved to Caleta Buena, Chile, where she loaded a cargo of nitrates.

Departing Caleta Buena on 4 November 1918, Western Star steamed via the Panama Canal to Savannah, Georgia, arriving there on 5 December 1918. After unloading the nitrates there, she proceeded to Tompkinsville, Staten Island, New York, arriving on 31 December 1918.

== Decommissioning and disposal ==
Western Star remained at Tompkinsville until 1 March 1919, when she was decommissioned and simultaneously transferred back to the U.S. Shipping Board.

== Later career ==
Once again SS Western Star, the ship remained in Shipping Board custody until abandoned in 1933.
