= Hooven-Owens-Rentschler =

American steam and diesel engine manufacturer

The firm of Hooven, Owens, Rentschler, and Company manufactured steam and diesel engines in Hamilton, Ohio. Because the firm was frequently known by its initials, H.O.R., the Hooven is sometimes incorrectly rendered as Hoover, and the Owens may be mistaken for Owen.

== History ==
=== Origin ===
The firm was the successor to the firm of Owens, Ebert & Dyer (founded in 1845 by Job E. Owens) which went into receivership in 1876.

In 1882, George A. Rentschler, J. C. Hooven, Henry C. Sohn, George H. Helvey, and James E. Campbell merged the firm with the iron works of Sohn and Rentschler, and adopted the name Hooven, Owens, Rentschler Co.

In 1883 the firm began the manufacture of Corliss steam engines, producing a total of 700 such engines by 1901.

=== 20th century, first part ===
By World War I, the Hooven-Owens-Rentschler Company operated the largest exclusive Corliss Engine plant in the country, employing nearly 800 men.

Also built were a number of triple expansion engines for the merchant fleet being built under the United States Shipping Board program. The engines had diameters of 27-45-71 inches and a stroke of 48 inches (556nhp - 562nhp).

- Union Construction Company, Oakland, California: Acardo, Amalthus

Diameters of 27.5-46-78 and a stroke of 51 inches (680nhp)

- Moore Shipbuilding Company, Oakland, California: M. F. Elliott (434nhp), Birkenhead, Lubrico (452nhp)

Diameters of 24.5-41.5-72 and a stroke of 48 inches (359nhp), vertical inverted direct-acting, Stephenson-link valve gear, piston travel 700 feet per minute, 88 rpm, intake 200psi, 2800hp

- Virginia Shipbuilding Company, Alexandria, Virginia: Betsy Bell, Anna E. Morse, Jennie R. Morse, Gunston Hall (580nhp)
- G. M. Standifer Construction, Vancouver, Washington: Coaxet, Bearport
- Moore Shipbuilding Company, Oakland, California: Bohemian Club
- J. F. Duthie & Company, Seattle, Washington: Deuel
- Skinner & Eddy, Seattle, Washington: Editor, Eglantine, Egremont
- Long Beach Shipbuilding Company, Long Beach, California: Haleakala
- Chickasaw Shipbuilding & Car Company, Chickasaw, Alabama (587nhp): Birmingham City, Ensley City
- G. A. Fuller Company, Wilmington, North Carolina (590nhp): City of Joliet, Cranford
- A. Bentley & Sons, Jacksonville, Florida (598nhp) (concrete): Dinsmore

Diameters of 25-42-70 and a stroke of 48 inches (340nhp)

- Standard Shipbuilding Corp., Shooters Island, New York: Balsam

Diameters of 23-39-66 and s stroke of 42 inches (261nhp)

- Federal Shipbuilding and Dry Dock Company, Kearny, New Jersey: Freeport Sulphur No. 5

Diameters of 18-30-48 and a stroke of 33 inches (132nhp), for steel-hulled tug boats

- Pensacola Shipbuilding Company, Pensacola, Florida: Adler (1921)

Diameters of 19-32-56 and a stroke of 36 inches (188nhp) for wooden cargo ships

- Union Bridge & Construction Company, Morgan City, Louisiana: Amoron
- Alabama Shipbuilding and Dry Dock Company, Mobile, Alabama: Banago
- Nelson & Kelez Shipbuilding Company, Seattle, Washington: Bonnafon, Forster
- American Shipbuilding Company, Brunswick, Georgia: Casmalia
- Tacoma Shipbuilding Company, Tacoma, Washington: Coloma
- Mobile Shipbuilding Company, Mobile, Alabama: Dalgada
- J. W. Murdock, Jacksonville, Florida: Dancey
- Sanderson & Porter, Raymond, Washington: Fonduco
- Barbare Bros., Tacoma, Washington: Mahaska

Diameters of 19-52-56 and a stroke of 36 inches (188nhp) for wooden cargo ships

- Mobile Shipbuilding Company, Mobile, Alabama: Balosaro

A quadruple-expansion engine with diameters of 24-35-51-75 and a stroke of 51 inches (552nhp)

- G. M. Standifer Construction, Vancouver, Washington: John Worthington, Livingstone Roe

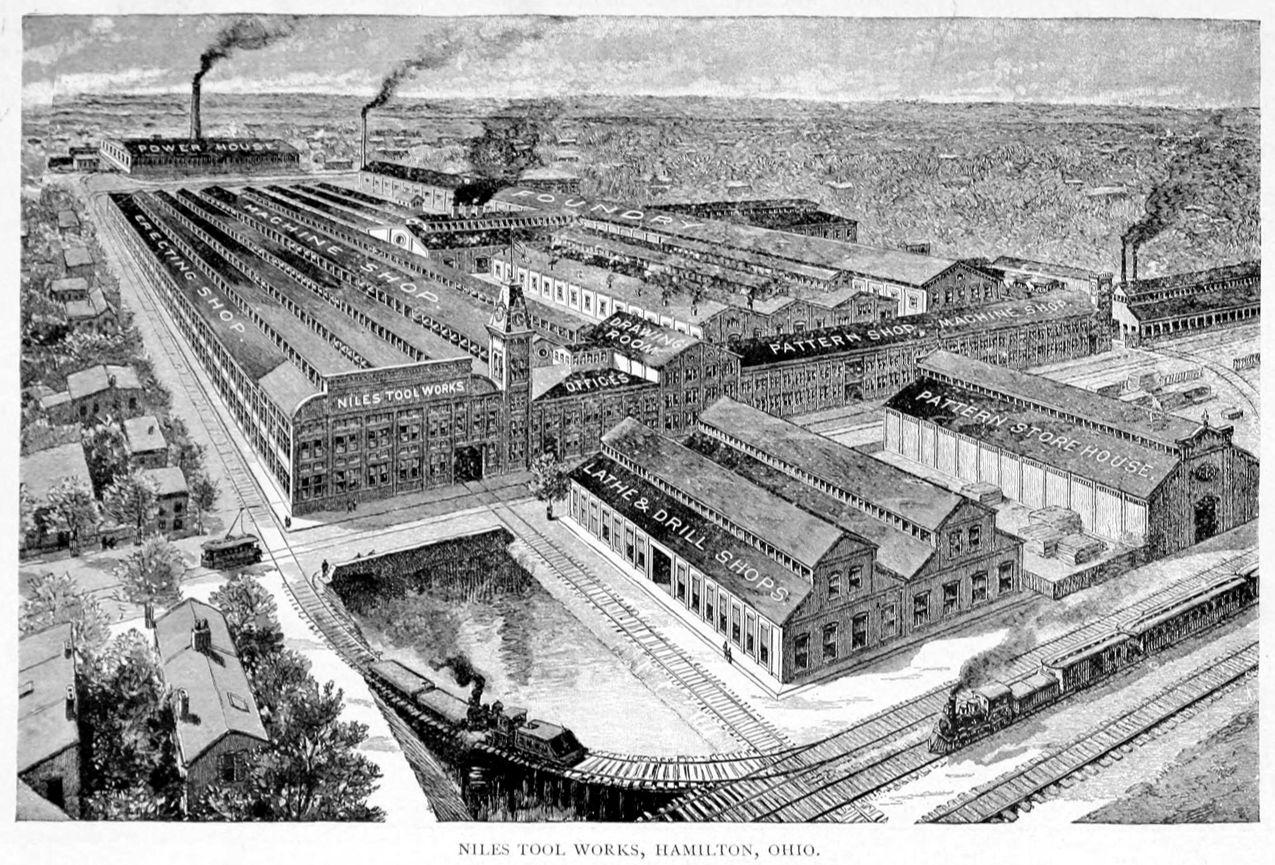
Niles Tool Works, Hamilton, Ohio, 1896

In 1928 the company merged with Niles-Bement-Pond to form the General Machinery Corporation. However, it continued to make diesel engines under the H.O.R. brand, and supplied many of the powerplants for United States submarines and liberty ships during World War II. General Machinery Corporation ranked 91st among United States corporations in the value of World War II military production contracts.

In the 1930s H.O.R. developed a double-acting two-stroke diesel engine, initially based on the German cruiser Leipzig's MAN engines but with eight cylinders instead of seven, expanded to nine cylinders in the final submarine version. The double-acting design produced more power from a physically smaller engine than conventional designs. However, H.O.R.'s double-acting engines, particularly those of USS Pompano, gained notoriety for their unreliability in the submarine force, where they were nicknamed "whores". Owing to the limited space available within the submarines, either opposed-piston or, in this case, double-acting engines were favored for being more compact. An inherent problem with double-acting cylinders, owing to the piston rod reducing the piston area on one side, is an imbalance in the force on each side of the piston. The H.O.R. engines were plagued by vibration and other problems as a result. This in turn overstressed the drive train and caused the gears (which themselves had been incorrectly manufactured) to shed teeth, create torsional vibration, and frequently rendered the engine and gear train inoperable. As an example of the problems caused by the unreliability of the H.O.R. engines, Captain Charles Herbert Andrews of USS Gurnard recalled concerning a war patrol in support of Operation Torch, "I only used three, saving the fourth for a spare. When two of them broke down in the Bay of Biscay, I cut the patrol short and limped back to Scotland."

During World War II, all submarine H.O.R. engines were replaced by early 1943, usually with General Motors Cleveland Diesel Engine Division 16-278A, or 16-248 V16 engines or Fairbanks-Morse Model 38 engines. The wartime performance of the H.O.R. engines was so poor that Captain Tommy Dykers of USS Jack said, "The H.O.R. engines saved the Japanese thirty or forty ships."

=== 20th century, second part ===
In 1947, General Machinery Corporation merged with Lima Locomotive Works to form Lima-Hamilton Corporation, which, in turn, merged in 1950 with Baldwin Locomotive Works to form the Baldwin-Lima-Hamilton Corporation. BLH, Hamilton Div., moved to the Eddystone, Pa. plant of BLH in 1959. BLH went out of business around 1966.

An HOR combination steam engine is preserved in the Henry Ford Museum in Dearborn, Michigan. It is one of 12 units (this one was built and installed in 1916) that were made for Mr. Ford for his Highland Park assembly plant where he produced the Model T from 1908 until its production demise in 1927. This engine was removed from the Highland Park facility and placed in storage after the Ford Motor Company took up permanent residence at the giant River Rouge facilities to produce the Model A. Mr. Ford donated the steam engine to his Edison Institute as the cornerstone display in 1929. The Edison Institute later was renamed the Henry Ford Museum and is known today as "The Henry Ford".

== Bibliography ==
- Blair, Clay Jr. (1975). Silent Victory. Vol. 1. New York: J.B Lippincott Company.
- Wright, C. C. (2005). "Question 17/03: Replacement of US Submarine Diesel Engines". Warship International. XLII (4): 431–434. ISSN 0043-0374.
