= Leschi (steam ferry) =

Boat

- Leschi circa 1915 on Lake Washington.

History
- Name: Leschi
- Owner: Seattle Port Commission, others.
- Builder: J. F. Duthie & Company.
- Launched: December 6, 1913
- In service: 1913
- Out of service: 1986
- Identification: US registry #11875
- Fate: Capsized.

General characteristics
- Type: steam and motor ferry, later a cannery vessel
- Tonnage: 433 gross; 272 registered
- Length: 169 ft (51.51 m)
- Beam: 33 ft (10.06 m)
- Depth: 8.3 ft (2.53 m) depth of hold
- Installed power: as built: steam engines, 700 hp (520 kW); converted to 500 hp (370 kW) diesel in 1931.
- Propulsion: originally sidewheels; rebuilt as propeller in 1931.
- Speed: 14 kn (25.93 km/h)to 15 kn (27.78 km/h)
- Capacity: 400 passengers, 40 automobiles
- Crew: eight (8)

Leschi was a steam ferry that operated on Lake Washington from 1913 to 1950, and afterwards on Puget Sound until 1967. From 1969 to 1986 the vessel was a floating cannery in Alaska.

== Career ==
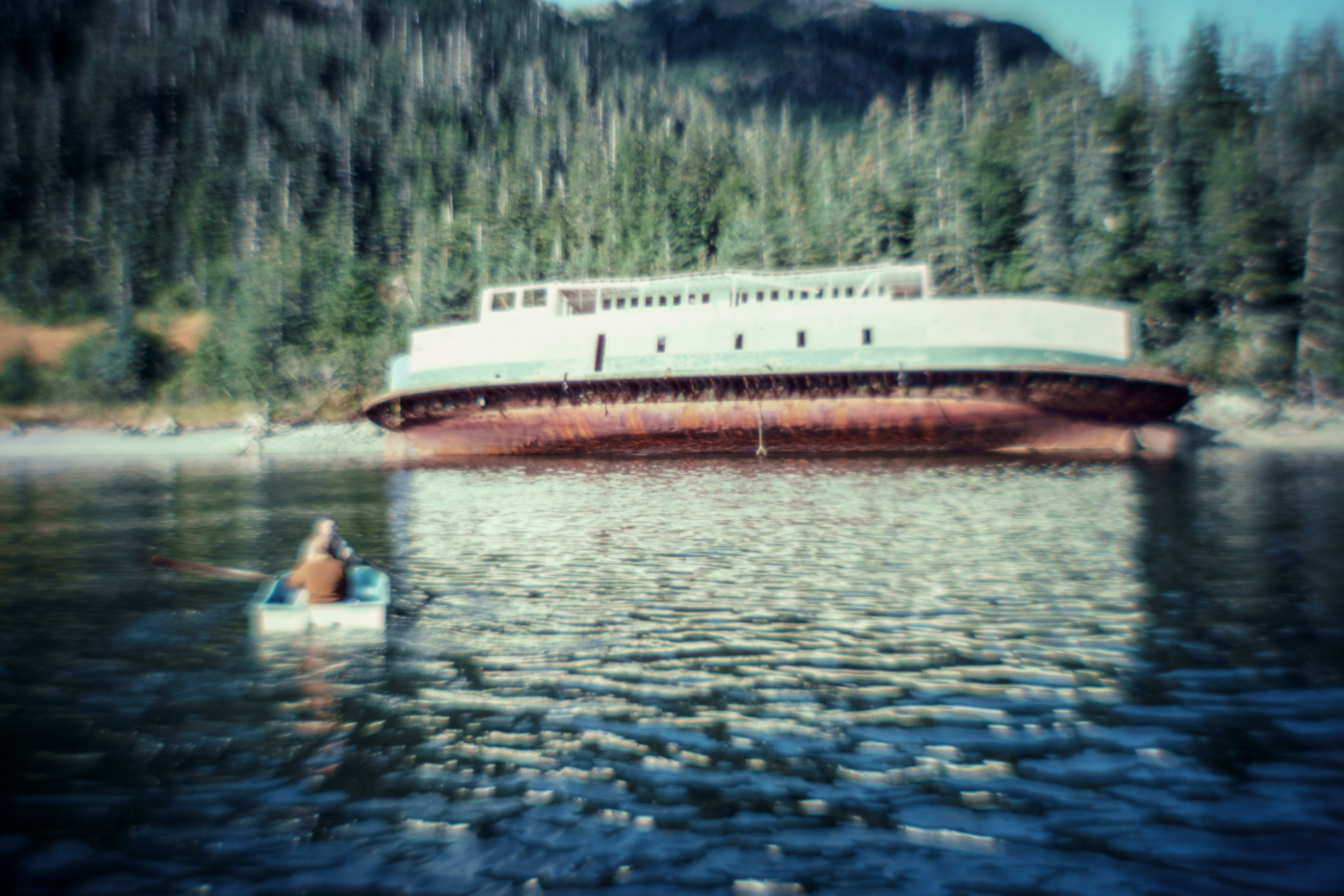
Remains of the ferry Leschi, circa 1978, in Alaska

The first ship ever commissioned by the Seattle Port Commission, and the first automobile ferry in Western Washington, Leschi was originally built as a side-wheel ferry by the Seattle firm of J. F. Duthie & Company. The paddle wheels were designed to give less water resistance by "feathering" which allowed the vessel to move faster through the water.

The steel hull was built on the East Waterway of the Duwamish River. Once the hull was complete, it was disassembled and transported to Rainier Beach on Lake Washington. Once there, the hull was reassembled by J.F Dulthie, the machinery was installed, and the upper works (these were of wood) were constructed. The ferry was launched on December 6, 1913. Conducting the christening was Eleanor Chittenden, daughter of the well-known Army engineer Hiram M. Chittenden (1858–1917), chairman of the Port Commission, who spoke at the ceremony.

In 1931 Leschi was rebuilt. The sidewheelers were removed and the ferry was converted to propeller drive. The steam engine was replaced by a 500 horsepower (370 kW) diesel. This increased the speed from 8 kn (14.82 km/h)to 12 kn (22.22 km/h). Later in 1931 the ferry was renamed the Ballard and placed on the Ballard to Suquamish run. Leschi continued to operate on Lake Washington even after the completion of the first floating bridge across the lake in 1940.

In 1948, Leschi was the last ferry operating on Lake Washington. Mrs. J.L. Anderson, the widow of Capt. John L. Anderson (1868–1941), was operating the vessel at that time. The city of Kirkland then took over operation of the ferry, with King County maintaining the two terminals at Madison Park and Kirkland.

Leschi remained in service on Lake Washington until 1950. The ferry was then transferred to the Vashon – Fauntleroy and the Mukilteo ferry routes. In 1951 the then new Washington State Ferry system purchased Leschi.

In 1967, Leschi was sold to Cape St. Elias Ocean Products Company. In 1969, at a cost of $200,000, Leschi was refitted at the Ballard Marine Center to serve as a cannery. The vessel then was transferred to Alaska where it was operated as floating salmon and crab cannery off Cordova and Valdez until 1986 when near Whittier the vessel capsized.
