= SS Cardina =

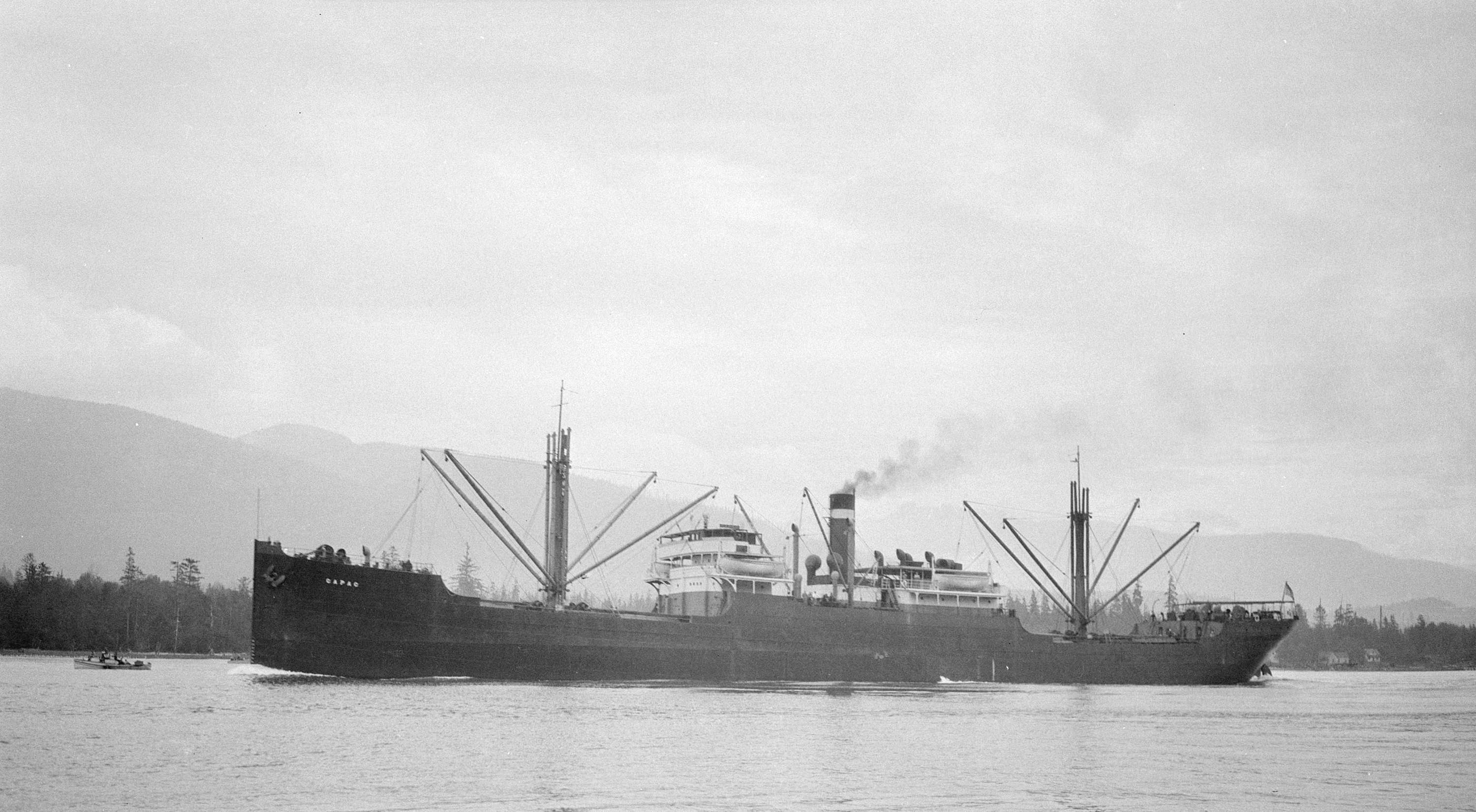
- SS Capac (formerly Deuel) in Vancouver (mid-1930s). Photograph by Walter E. Frost

History

United States;Panama
- Name: Deuel (1919–1926); Capac (1926–1940); Cardina (1940–1942)
- Owner: USSB (1919–1926); W. R. Grace and Company (1926–1940); Compania de Vapores Cardina, S.A. (1940–1942)
- Operator: Struthers & Dixon (1919–1921); Rogers & Webb (1921–1926); W. R. Grace and Company (1926–1940)
- Builder: J. F. Duthie & Company
- Yard number: 28
- Launched: 27 September 1919
- Sponsored by: Miss Gladys Swalwell
- Christened: Deuel
- Commissioned: 11 November 1919
- Home port: Panama City
- Identification: US official number 219209; Code letters LTPR (1920–33); call sign KOMO (1933–40); call sign HPPP (1941–42)
- Fate: Sunk, June 15, 1942

General characteristics
- Tonnage: 5,586 GRT; 3,465 NRT; tonnage under deck 5,113; deadweight 8,565
- Length: 410 ft 3 in (125.04 m)
- Beam: 54 ft 2 in (16.51 m)
- Depth: 27 ft 7 in (8.41 m)
- Installed power: 2800 Ihp, 359 Nhp
- Propulsion: Hooven-Owens-Rentschler 3-cylinder triple expansion
- Speed: 10.5 knots
- Crew: 45

Cardina was a cargo ship built in 1919 by the J. F. Duthie & Company of Seattle. She was one of the many ships built by the company for the United States Shipping Board.

== Design and construction ==
The West ships were cargo ships of similar size and design built by several shipyards on the West Coast of the United States for the United States Shipping Board (USSB) for emergency use during World War I. Most were given names that began with the word West. The ship was laid down as West Hesperia (J. F. Duthie & Company yard number 28, USSB hull number 1478) and renamed to Deuel after World War I had come to an end. Deuel was launched at the shipyard of J. F. Duthie & Company in Seattle on 27 September 1919 by sponsor Miss Gladys Swalwell, a fiancé of Wallace F. Duthie, son of J. F. Duthie. The ship was named in honor of Deuel County, South Dakota. As built, the ship was 410 feet 5 1/2 inches (125.108 m) long (between perpendiculars) and 54 feet 0 inches (16.46 m) abeam, a mean draft of 24 feet 1 1/4 inches (7.347 m). Deuel was assessed at 5,586 GRT, 3,465 NRT and 8,565 DWT. The vessel had a steel hull, and a single 359 nhp triple-expansion steam engine that drove a single screw propeller, and moved the ship at up to 10.5 knots (12.1 mph; 19.4 km/h).

== Operational history ==
Cardina was launched as Deuel on September 27, 1919, and delivered to the United States Shipping Board on November 11, 1919. She left for her maiden voyage under command of Master William Reed from Seattle on November 17, 1919, with a cargo of steel, cotton, timber and other general cargo and arrived in Yokohama on December 17, 1919. During her first trip, she ran aground about 10 miles northwest of Tokyo Bay in the morning of December 14. Her bow was high on the beach, and the stern almost under the water. After this trip her master was relieved of his duties on April 10, 1920. During 1920–1921 Deuel operated the route between the US West Coast, Japan, China, Philippines, Saigon, Singapore, with occasional stops in Honolulu.

In the fall of 1921 Deuel was reallocated to a different operator, and moved to East Coast and started operations on Boston, Hamburg, Rotterdam, Antwerp line. On May 20, 1922, she entered Boston shipyard for repairs caused by ice in Hamburg. In November 1922, she was temporarily disabled due to a broken shaft. On July 21, 1923, while in Hamburg, a fire broke in the fire-room bilges, and it took more than two hours to extinguish it.

In August 1926, Deuel was sold by the United States Shipping Board to W. R. Grace and Company and renamed Capac. The ship operated mostly between the US West Coast ports and a number of South American ports. Her engine was refitted to be able to use oil fuel.

Capac was acquired by Cardina Steamship Corporation on March 21, 1940, and her home port was moved to Panama City. The ship continued operating between various South American ports and the ports on the East Coast of the US.

=== Sinking ===
On June 15, 1942, SS Cardina was en route from Buenos Aires to New York City with a cargo of 7000 tons of linseed in bulk under command of master Einar Falnes. She was unescorted and unarmed and not zigzagging. At 12:45 local time in position 4°45′N 40°55′W, about 500 miles northeast of São Luís, Brazil was torpedoed by the Archimede. The first torpedo hit at 12:45 on the portside, at #5 hold. The explosion caused Cardina to take an immediate list. The crew abandoned ship a few minutes later, but when it appeared the ship was not sinking, the crew returned to the ship and after a few repairs managed to restart the engines. At about 17:30 the engines were stopped and the crew abandoned ship again. Archimede fired another torpedo which struck on the port side tearing a huge hole in the hull. In addition, the sub surfaced and commenced firing her deck gun. Three direct hits were made on the ship's hull. The ship was abandoned and the Master ordered all boats to head for the Brazilian coast. On June 22, 1942, all boats safely reached São Luís and from there were flown to Belém.
