= Richard L. Conolly =

United States Navy admiral (1892–1962)

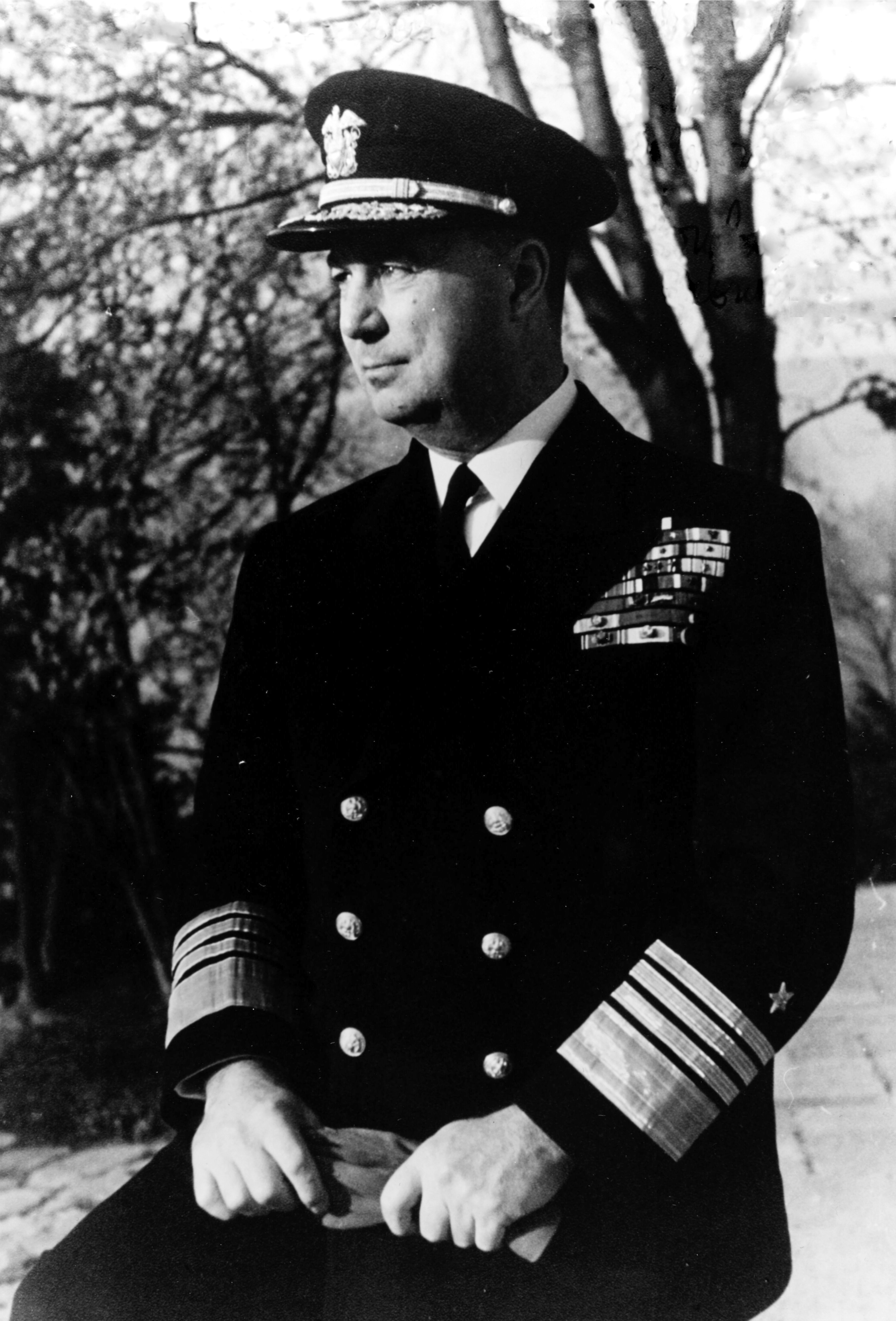
- Admiral Conolly in London, England, c. February 1950
- Born: April 26, 1892; Waukegan, Illinois, U.S.
- Died: March 1, 1962 (aged 69); Jamaica Bay, New York City, New York, U.S.
- Burial place: Arlington National Cemetery
- Military career
- Allegiance: United States
- Branch: United States Navy
- Service years: 1914–1953
- Rank: Admiral
- Nickname: "Close-in Conolly"
- Commands: Naval War College; United States Naval Forces Eastern Atlantic and Mediterranean; United States Twelfth Fleet; Destroyer Squadron 6 Destroyer Division 7 USS Du Pont
- Conflicts: World War I World War II
- Awards: Navy Cross; Navy Distinguished Service Medal (4); Legion of Merit (2)
- Other work: President of Long Island University

Richard Lansing Conolly (April 26, 1892 – March 1, 1962) was a United States Navy admiral, who served during World War I and World War II.

== Early life ==
Conolly was born in Waukegan, Illinois, attended Lake Forest Academy and was appointed to the United States Naval Academy, Annapolis, graduating in 1914. He was assigned to the battleship Virginia and served in Mexican waters. Between May and November 1915 he received training aboard the armored cruiser Montana, and in March 1916 he was assigned to the battleship Vermont as Torpedo Officer.

== Naval career ==
=== World War I ===
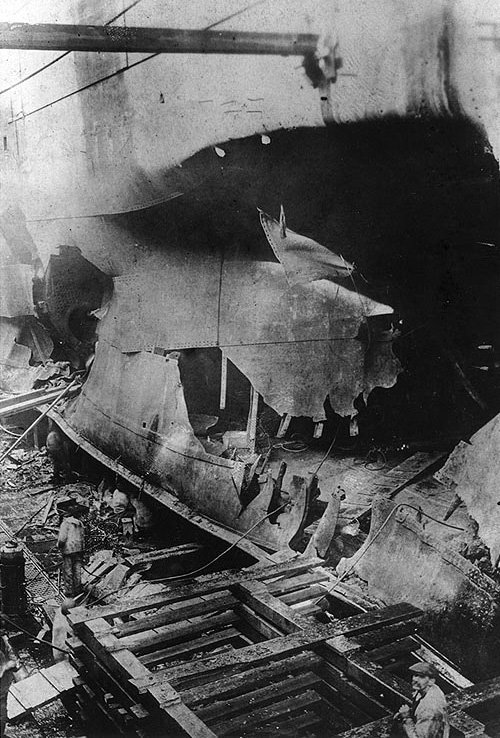
USS West Bridge in drydock at Brest, France, showing the two torpedo holes received in a German submarine attack on 15 August 1918

Transferred in May 1916 to the destroyer Smith, Conolly was aboard her when the United States entered World War I in April 1917. Smith performed escort duty in European waters out of Brest, France.

Conolly was awarded the Navy Cross for his actions in connection with the salvaging of the transport ship USS West Bridge, which was hit by two torpedoes launched by the German submarine U-107 in August 1918.

=== Inter-war period ===
Conolly returned to the United States in November 1918, fitting out, and serving as Executive Officer of the destroyers Foote, Worden and Hunt in turn. From August 1920 he studied electrical engineering at Annapolis and Columbia University, New York, receiving a Master of Science degree in June 1922. He then served aboard the battleship USS Mississippi, transferring to the battleship USS New York in March 1924 to serve as assistant Engineer Officer until September 1925. He then returned to Annapolis, this time as an instructor in the Department of Electrical Engineering and Physics.

In June 1927 Conolly returned to sea as Engineer Officer of the light cruiser USS Concord. In August 1929 he assumed command of the destroyer USS Du Pont. He completed the junior course at the Naval War College, Newport, Rhode Island in May 1931, and remained on the staff for two years.

In May 1933 Conolly reported as aide and Flag Secretary on the staff of Commander Cruisers, Scouting Force, and from April 1935 until June 1936 he served as Navigator aboard the battleship Tennessee. He then returned to the Naval Academy, serving as an instructor in the Department of Electrical Engineering and Physics, and later in the Department of Seamanship and Navigation.

Conolly assumed command of Destroyer Division 7 in May 1939, transferring to Destroyer Squadron 6 on 30 January 1941. He was at sea, in command of DESRON 6 at the time of the Japanese attack on Pearl Harbor on 7 December 1941.

=== World War II ===
Conolly participated in the initial attack on the Gilbert and Marshall Islands on 1 February 1942, as part of the force under the command of Admiral William Halsey, Jr., and in April his destroyers served as escort for the aircraft carrier Hornet, from which Lieutenant Colonel Jimmy Doolittle's aircraft took off for the first bombing raid on Tokyo. He also participated in a shore bombardment of Wake Island in command of the destroyers in Rear Admiral Raymond A. Spruance's Task Group.

Promoted to rear admiral in July 1942, Conolly served on the staff of the Chief of Naval Operations (CNO) and Commander-in-Chief (C-in-C) Fleet Admiral Ernest King.

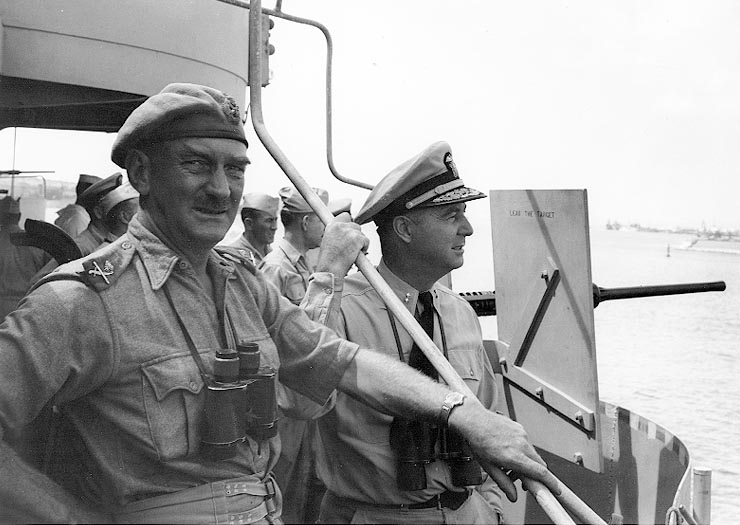
Rear Admiral Richard L. Conolly, pictured here on the right, alongside British Major General J. L. I. Hawkesworth aboard USS Biscayne, 6 September 1943

Between March and October 1943 Conolly served with the Amphibious Force Atlantic Fleet, taking part in the invasions of Sicily and Italy. Transferred to the Pacific, he was with amphibious forces in the Pacific and participated in the landings on Kwajalein, Wake and Marcus Islands.

Conolly commanded Group 3, Amphibious Force, Pacific Fleet during 1944 and 1945, and led the landings on Guam in July 1944, and the Lingayen Gulf in January 1945.

Conolly gained the nickname "Close-In Conolly" from his insistence that fire support ships should be extremely close to the beach during amphibious assaults. Conolly believed that strong fortifications could be neutralized only by direct hits, which could only be achieved from the shortest possible range.

== Post-war ==
Conolly was naval representative to the 1946 Paris Peace Conference. He commanded the United States Twelfth Fleet from September 1946 until January 1947, then United States Naval Forces Eastern Atlantic and Mediterranean from 1947 until 1950.

Conolly's last assignment was as President of the Naval War College at Newport, Rhode Island, between 1950 and 1953. Conolly retired with the rank of admiral in November 1953, and was then the president of Long Island University until 1962.

On 1 March 1962 Conolly and his wife, Helen B. Conolly, were passengers aboard American Airlines Flight 1, which crashed into Jamaica Bay soon after take-off from Idlewild Airport, New York City, killing all 95 passengers and crew aboard.

He was buried at Arlington National Cemetery, Arlington, Virginia. The ship USS Conolly (DD-979), a Spruance-class destroyer, was named for Conolly.

Military offices
Preceded by Donald B. Beary	President of the Naval War College; 1950–1953	Succeeded by Lynde D. McCormick
