= SS Noyo =

A number of steamships were named Noyo, including:

- SS Noyo (1913), an American cargo ship wrecked in 1935
- SS Noyo (1920), an American cargo ship in service 1935–40
