= SS Nikkin Maru =

1920–1944 Japanese troop transport ship

Nikkin Maru
History

Japan
- Builder: J. F. Duthie & Company, Seattle
- Launched: 20 December 1919
- In service: 1920-1944
- Fate: Sunk, 30 June 1944

General characteristics
- Type: Troop transport
- Tonnage: 5,587 GRT
- Armament: depth charge launchers

Nikkin Maru (日錦丸) was a 5,587-ton Japanese troop transport during World War II, which sank on 30 June 1944 with great loss of life.

Nikkin Maru was originally built in January 1920 as the West Ivan by the J. F. Duthie & Company in Seattle for the United States Shipping Board Merchant Fleet Corporation. Renamed Golden West in 1928 and Canadian in 1937, she was confiscated by the Japanese in 1941 and renamed Hokusei Maru and finally Nikkin Maru.

Requisitioned by the IJA in early 1943. On 30 June 1944, Nikkin Maru was transporting around 3,200 men of the Japanese 23rd Army from Korea to Japan. The unescorted Nikkin Maru was discovered by the US submarine USS Tang and torpedoed and sunk in the Yellow Sea off Mokpo, Korea, at position 35°05´N, 125°00´E. Probably all 3,400 soldiers and crew members drowned, .

== See also ==
- List by death toll of ships sunk by submarines
