= SS Junipero Serra =

Liberty ship of WWII

- A Liberty ship at sea

History

United States
- Name: Junipero Serra
- Namesake: Junípero Serra
- Owner: War Shipping Administration
- Operator: Sudden & Christenson Company
- Builder: California Shipbuilding Corporation
- Yard number: 292
- Way number: 43
- Laid down: 20 May 1942
- Launched: 30 June 1942
- Completed: 12 July 1942
- Fate: Scrapped, 1959 in Seattle

General characteristics
- Class & type: Liberty ship; type EC2-S-C1, standard
- Tonnage: 10,865 LT DWT; 7,176 GRT
- Displacement: 3,380 long tons (3,434 t) (light); 14,245 long tons (14,474 t) (max)
- Length: 441 feet 6 inches (135 m) oa; 416 feet (127 m) pp; 427 feet (130 m) lwl
- Beam: 57 feet (17 m)
- Draft: 27 ft 9.25 in (8.4646 m)
- Installed power: 2 × Oil fired 450 °F (232 °C) boilers, operating at 220 psi (1,500 kPa); 2,500 hp (1,900 kW)
- Propulsion: 1 × triple-expansion steam engine, (manufactured by General Machinery Corp., Hamilton, Ohio); 1 × screw propeller
- Speed: 11.5 knots (21.3 km/h; 13.2 mph)
- Capacity: 562,608 cubic feet (15,931 m^{3}) (grain); 499,573 cubic feet (14,146 m^{3}) (bale)
- Complement: 38–62 USMM; 21–40 USNAG
- Armament: Varied by ship; Bow-mounted 3-inch (76 mm)/50-caliber gun; Stern-mounted 4-inch (102 mm)/50-caliber gun; 2–8 × single 20-millimeter (0.79 in) Oerlikon anti-aircraft (AA) cannons and/or, 2–8 × 37-millimeter (1.46 in) M1 AA guns

SS Junipero Serra was a Liberty ship built in the United States during World War II. The ship was operated by the War Shipping Administration. In 1959, the ship was scrapped in Seattle, meeting the same fate as most other Liberty ships.

== Career ==
Junipero Serra was laid down on 20 May 1942 as Yard Number 292 by the California Shipbuilding Corporation (Calship) in Los Angeles. The ship was launched on 30 June 1942 and was completed on 12 July 1942. The ship, named after the Spanish priest and missionary Junípero Serra y Ferrer, was Calship's 42nd Liberty ship completed. It took 41 days to complete, surpassing Calship's previous record of quickest Liberty ship built by 18 days; the previous record was held by the SS Joseph McKenna.

For World War II she was operated by Sudden & Christenson Company for the United States Maritime Commission. She was built under the Emergency Shipbuilding program. United States Navy Armed Guard manned the deck guns.

The ship was scrapped in February 1959 in Seattle.
