= SS Western Sea =

American steam cargo ship

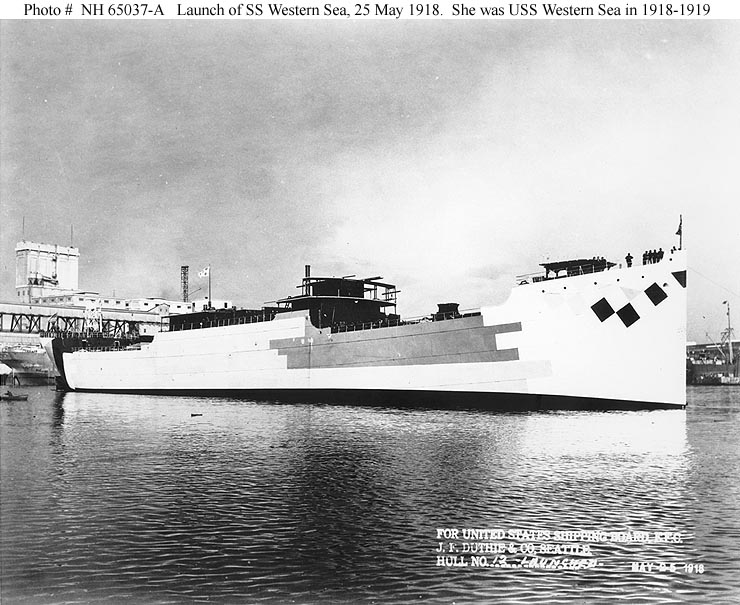
- SS Western Sea just after launching at the J. F. Duthie and Company shipyard in Seattle on 25 May 1918.

History

United States
- Name: Western Sea
- Owner: USSB
- Builder: J. F. Duthie & Co., Seattle
- Yard number: 12
- Laid down: 5 January 1918
- Launched: 25 May 1918
- Commissioned: 20 June 1918
- Maiden voyage: 7 July 1918
- Homeport: Seattle
- Identification: US Official Number 216465; Call sign LKWC
- Fate: Scrapped, 1931

History

United States
- Name: USS Western Sea
- Operator: U.S. Navy (1918–1919)
- Acquired: 29 June 1918
- Commissioned: 29 June 1918
- Decommissioned: 9 May 1919
- Fate: Returned to owners 9 May 1919

General characteristics
- Type: Design 1013 ship
- Tonnage: 5,813 GRT; 4,317 NRT; 8,556 DWT
- Displacement: 12,200 tons (normal)
- Length: 409 ft 5 in (124.79 m)
- Beam: 54 ft 2 in (16.51 m)
- Draft: 24 ft 1 in (7.34 m) mean
- Depth: 27 ft 6 in (8.38 m)
- Installed power: 579 Nhp, 2,500 ihp
- Propulsion: De Laval Steam Turbine Co. steam turbine, double reduction geared to one screw
- Speed: 10 1/2 knots (12.1 mph; 19.4 km/h)
- Complement: 92

Western Sea was a steam cargo ship built in 1918 by J. F. Duthie and Company of Seattle for the United States Shipping Board as part of the wartime shipbuilding program of the Emergency Fleet Corporation (EFC) to restore the nation's Merchant Marine.

== Construction and acquisition ==
Western Sea was laid down as the single-screw commercial cargo ship SS War Emerald by J. F. Duthie and Company in Seattle, Washington, for the United States Shipping Board. Renamed SS Western Sea while under construction, she was launched on 25 May 1918 and completed late in June 1918. Upon her completion, the Shipping Board transferred her immediately to the U.S. Navy for use during World War I. The Navy assigned her the naval registry identification number 3153 and commissioned her at Seattle on 29 June 1918 as USS Western Sea (ID-3153) under the command of Lieutenant Commander C. E. Stewart, USNRF.

== Navy career ==
After loading a cargo of 6,812 tons of flour, Western Sea departed Seattle on 7 July 1918 and steamed via the Panama Canal to New York City, where she arrived on 11 August 1918 and unloaded her flour. After loading 14 trucks and other general cargo for the United States Army in France, she steamed to Brest, France, then moved on to Bordeaux, where she offloaded her Army cargo.

After loading 1,000 tons of pyrite at Bordeaux, Western Sea proceeded to Halifax, Nova Scotia, Canada, and then to New York City, where she arrived on 24 November 1918. After unloading the pyrite, she took on a cargo of 7,516 tons of general U.S. Army stores and got under way for Falmouth in the United Kingdom, pausing there before proceeding to Rotterdam in the Netherlands, where she arrived on 25 January 1919 and discharged her cargo. On 7 February 1919, she departed Rotterdam to return to the United States, arriving at New York City on 1 March 1919.

== Decommissioning and disposal ==
After just over two months of inactivity, Western Sea was decommissioned at New York on 5 May 1919. She was simultaneously struck from the Navy list and transferred back to the U.S. Shipping Board that day.

== Later career ==
Once again SS Western Sea, the ship remained under Shipping Board control until scrapped in Baltimore, Maryland, in 1931.
