= USS Western Hope =

United States Navy cargo ship

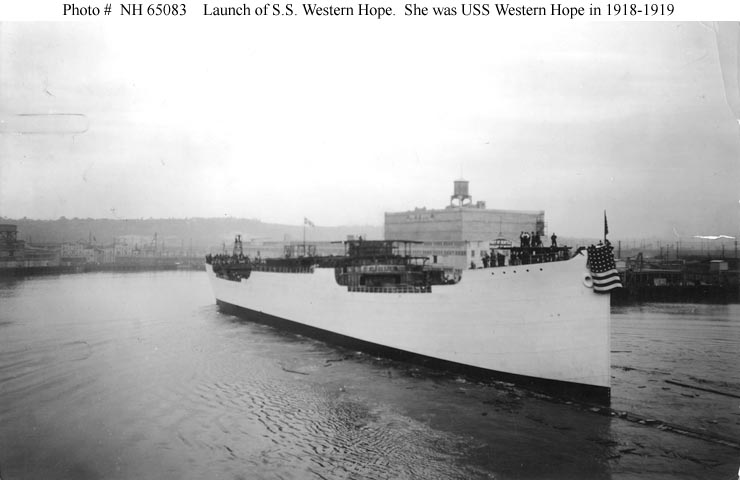
- SS Western Hope just after launching at the J. F. Duthie and Company shipyard in Seattle, Washington, on 29 July 1918.

History

United States
- Name: USS Western Hope
- Builder: J. F. Duthie and Company, Seattle, Washington
- Launched: 29 July 1918
- Completed: late September 1918
- Acquired: late September 1918
- Commissioned: 25 September 1918
- Decommissioned: 5 May 1919
- Stricken: 5 May 1919
- Fate: Returned to U.S. Shipping Board 5 May 1919
- Notes: Operated as commercial cargo ship SS Western Hope 1919-1923; Laid up 1923; Abandoned early 1930s; Scrapped 1932

General characteristics
- Type: Cargo ship
- Tonnage: 5,750 Gross register tons
- Displacement: 12,170 tons
- Length: 423 ft 9 in (129.16 m)
- Beam: 54 ft 0 in (16.46 m)
- Draft: 24 ft 1 in (7.34 m) (mean)
- Depth: 29 ft 9 in (9.07 m)
- Propulsion: One 3,000-ihp (2.237-mW) steam engine, one shaft
- Speed: 9.5 knots (17.6 km/h; 10.9 mph)
- Complement: 102
- Armament: none

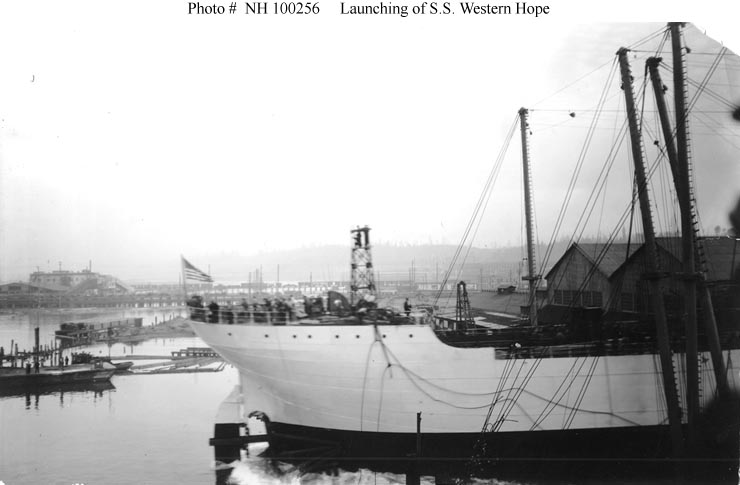
The launching of SS Western Hope at the J. F. Duthie and Company shipyard in Seattle, Washington, on 29 July 1918.

USS Western Hope (ID-3771) was a cargo ship of the United States Navy that served during World War I and its immediate aftermath.`

== Construction and acquisition ==
Western Hope was laid down as the steel-hulled, single screw Design 1013 commercial cargo ship SS War Ruby by J. F. Duthie and Company in Seattle, Washington, for the Cunard Line. Taken over by the United States Shipping Board and renamed SS Western Hope, she was launched on 29 July 1918 and completed late in September 1918. Upon her completion, the Shipping Board transferred her immediately to the U.S. Navy for use during World War I. The Navy assigned her the naval registry identification number 3771 and commissioned her at Seattle on 25 September 1918 as USS Western Hope (ID-3771).

== Navy career ==
After loading a cargo of flour, Western Hope departed Seattle on 8 October 1918 and steamed via the Panama Canal to New York City, where she arrived on 7 November 1918, four days before the armistice with Germany that ended World War I. She departed New York on 17 November 1918 bound for Gibraltar and, upon arriving there, was routed to Italy on 7 December 1918. She developed engine trouble and paused for repairs at Taranto, Italy, before proceeding to Trieste, Italy, where she discharged her cargo of flour.

Western Hope departed Trieste on 16 March 1919 and steamed via the Strait of Gibraltar to Newport News, Virginia, where she arrived on 21 April 1919.

== Decommissioning and disposal ==
Decommissioned at Newport News on 5 May 1919, Western Hope was simultaneously struck from the Navy list and transferred back to the U.S. Shipping Board.

== Later career ==
Once again SS Western Hope, the ship operated commercially under Shipping Board control until laid up in 1923. After that, she never returned to service and was abandoned due to age and deterioration in the early 1930s. The Boston Iron and Metal Works Company of Baltimore, Maryland, scrapped her in 1932.
