= USS Westover =

Cargo ship

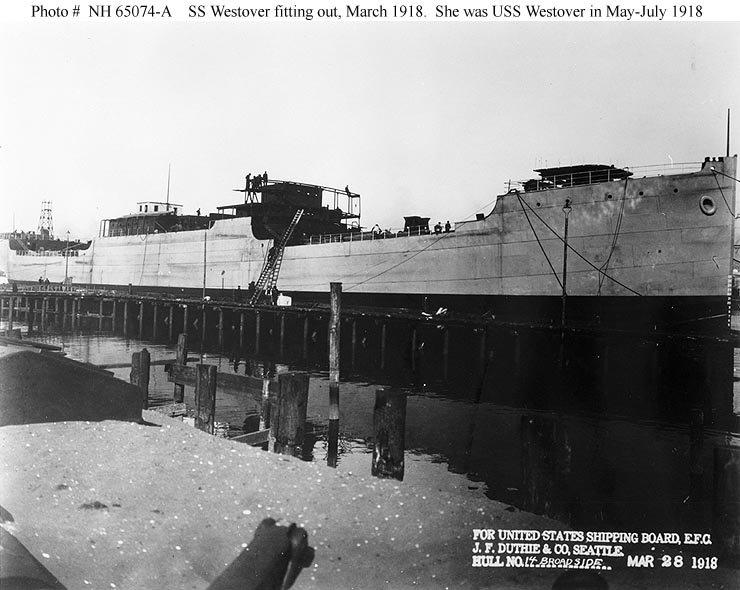
- War Sun fitting out at the J. F. Duthie and Company shipyard in Seattle, Washington, on 28 March 1918.

History

United States
- Name: USS Westover
- Builder: J. F. Duthie and Company, Seattle, Washington
- Launched: 17 February 1918
- Completed: 18 April 1918
- Acquired: May 1918
- Commissioned: 22 May 1918
- Fate: Sunk 11 July 1918

General characteristics
- Type: Cargo ship
- Tonnage: 5,700 Gross register tons
- Displacement: 12,205 tons
- Length: 423 ft 9 in (129.16 m)
- Beam: 54 ft 0 in (16.46 m)
- Draft: 24 ft 1 in (7.34 m) (mean)
- Depth: 29 ft 9 in (9.07 m)
- Propulsion: Steam engine, one shaft
- Speed: 10.5 knots (19.4 km/h; 12.1 mph)
- Complement: 92
- Armament: 1 × 5-inch (127-mm) gun; 1 × 6-pounder (2.7-kg) gun

USS Westover (ID-2867) was a cargo ship of the United States Navy that served during World War I and was sunk during her maiden voyage.

== Construction and acquisition ==
Westover was laid down as the Design 1013 commercial cargo ship SS War Sun by J. F. Duthie and Company in Seattle, Washington, for the Cunard Line. During construction, she was taken over by the United States Emergency Fleet Corporation and renamed SS Westover. She was launched on 17 February 1918.

On 9 April 1918, while Westover was still fitting out, the U.S. Navy inspected her for possible use during World War I. After her completion on 18 April 1918, she steamed to the United States East Coast and was transferred to the U.S. Navy in May 1918. Assigned the naval registry identification number 2867, she was commissioned as USS Westover (ID-2867) at Newport News, Virginia, on 22 May 1918.

== Navy career ==
Assigned to the Naval Overseas Transportation Service, Westover steamed to New York City, where she took on a capacity cargo of general United States Army supplies and got underway in convoy on 27 May 1918 bound for St. Nazaire, France. She developed engine trouble during the voyage and fell astern of the convoy. She continued toward France alone and at low speed until 0730 on 11 July 1918, when the submerged German submarine U-92 torpedoed her and sent her to the bottom of the Atlantic Ocean at 46°36′N 12°21′W with the loss of 11 members of her crew.
