= USS Azimech =

Cargo ship of the United States Navy

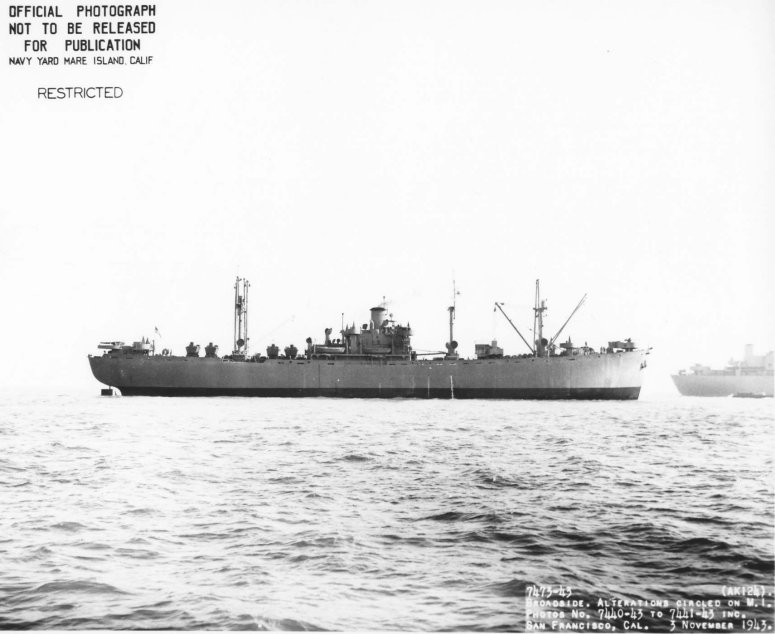
- USS Azimech (AK-124), (broadside view) underway off San Francisco, 3 November 1943.

History

United States
- Name: Mary Patten
- Namesake: Mary Patten
- Owner: War Shipping Administration (WSA)
- Operator: Sudden & Christenson Inc.
- Ordered: as a Type EC2-S-C1 hull, MCE hull 1725
- Builder: Permanente Metals Corporation, Richmond, California
- Yard number: 1725
- Way number: 3
- Laid down: 21 July 1943
- Launched: 11 August 1943
- Sponsored by: Mrs. Otis A. Kent
- In service: 22 August 1943
- Fate: transferred to the US Navy, 7 October 1943

United States
- Name: Azimech
- Namesake: The star Azimech
- Acquired: 7 October 1943
- Commissioned: 29 October 1943
- Decommissioned: 11 December 1945
- Refit: converted for Naval service at Moore Drydock Co, Oakland, CA.
- Stricken: 3 January 1946
- Identification: Hull symbol: AK-124; Code letters: NHDV
- Honors and awards: 1 × battle stars
- Fate: Sold for scrapping, 12 September 1972, removed 8 December 1972

General characteristics
- Class & type: Crater-class cargo ship
- Displacement: 4,023 long tons (4,088 t) (standard); 14,550 long tons (14,780 t) (full load)
- Length: 441 ft 6 in (134.57 m)
- Beam: 56 ft 11 in (17.35 m)
- Draft: 28 ft 4 in (8.64 m)
- Installed power: 2 × Combustion Engineering header-type boilers, 220psi 450°; 2,500 shp (1,900 kW)
- Propulsion: 1 × Joshua Hendy vertical triple-expansion reciprocating steam engine; 1 × shaft
- Speed: 12.5 kn (23.2 km/h; 14.4 mph)
- Capacity: 7,800 t (7,700 long tons) DWT; 444,206 cu ft (12,578.5 m^{3}) (non-refrigerated)
- Complement: 205
- Armament: 1 × 5 in (127 mm)/38 caliber dual-purpose (DP) gun; 1 × 3 in (76 mm)/50 caliber DP gun; 2 × 40 mm (1.57 in) Bofors anti-aircraft (AA) gun mounts; 6 × 20 mm (0.79 in) Oerlikon cannon AA gun mounts

USS Azimech (AK-124) was a Crater-class cargo ship commissioned by the US Navy for service in World War II, named after the Azimech, the other name of Spica, the brightest star in constellation Virgo. She was responsible for delivering troops, goods and equipment to locations in the war zone.

== Construction ==
Mary Patten was laid down on 21 July 1943, under a Maritime Commission (MARCOM) contract, MCE hull 1725, by the Permanente Metals Corporation, Yard No. 2,Richmond, California; launched on 11 August 1943; sponsored by Mrs. Otis A. Kent; acquired by the Navy on 7 October 1943; renamed Azimech and designated AK-124 on 11 October 1943; converted for naval service at Oakland, California, by the Moore Dry Dock Company; and commissioned on 29 October 1943.

== Service history ==
After a brief shakedown, the cargo ship got underway on 11 November, for Hawaii. At Pearl Harbor, she was assigned for duty to Service Squadron 8, US Pacific Fleet. The ship discharged her cargo and then entered the Pearl Harbor Navy Yard for an overhaul of her main engines and boilers. Azimech was on keelblocks for 16 days, then began loading cargo. She set sail on 28 December, for the Gilbert Islands.

=== Supporting Tarawa operations ===
Azimech reached Tarawa on 8 January 1944, and began unloading her cargo. The process was hampered by frequent enemy air attacks and reefs in the lagoon which permitted the ship to unload only at high tide. Azimech made additional stops at Makin and Apamama Islands before heading back to Pearl Harbor. After a brief stop in Hawaii, Azimech continued on to the US West Coast and moored at San Pedro, California, on 6 March. Following an availability period at Terminal Island from 10 March until 9 April, she filled her holds with cargo at Oakland, California, and began the voyage back to Hawaii on 26 April.

=== Providing service at Majuro and Eniwetok ===
On 7 May, Azimech sailed from Pearl Harbor with a convoy bound for Majuro. They reached that naval base on 18 May, and reported to Service Squadron 10 for duty. The cargo ship lay at anchor in Majuro lagoon, issuing stores to forces ashore, until 3 June, when she got underway for Eniwetok. After serving at that atoll until 24 August, she steamed back to Hawaii; paused for one day at Pearl Harbor; and then pushed on to the US West Coast.

=== Servicing Ulithi and Kossol Roads ===
The ship reached San Francisco, California, on 13 September, to begin reloading operations. While taking on cargo, she also received minor repairs and alterations before heading west again on 26 September. After stops at Pearl Harbor and Eniwetok, Azimech arrived at Ulithi on 2 November. She operated there until 16 November and then steamed in company with Compel to Kossol Roads. Two days later, the ships reached their destination, and Azimech began issuing supplies. On 5 December 1944, the vessel weighed anchor and traveled back to Pearl Harbor via Ulithi and Eniwetok.

=== Overhaul at the Puget Sound Navy Yard ===
Following the holidays, Azimech got underway for Seattle, Washington, and entered the Puget Sound Navy Yard on 16 January 1945, for repairs. On 15 February, she began steaming for Eniwetok and reached that atoll on 11 March. Following eight days at Ulithi, she set sail for the Ryūkyūs.

=== Supporting Okinawa and Guam ===
Azimech remained anchored off Kerama Retto from 18 to 29 April. On the latter day, she shifted berth to Hagushi beach, Okinawa, her base until 7 May, when she sailed for Guam. The cargo ship began loading cargo there on 24 May, and did not finish the task until 8 June. She then got underway for Ulithi and, on 10 June, anchored in that lagoon where she remained for the duration of the war.

== Inactivation and decommissioning ==
On 23 August, Azimech shaped a course for the coast of southern California. Reaching San Pedro, California, on 15 September, the ship unloaded her ammunition and provisions to prepare for a yard period. She sailed again on 13 October, bound for Norfolk, Virginia. After transiting the Panama Canal on 25 October, Azimech reached Hampton Roads on 3 November.

She immediately began preparations for deactivation. The cargo ship moved to Baltimore, Maryland, on 21 November for a final yard period and was decommissioned on 11 December. Her name was struck from the Navy List on 3 January 1946.

The ship was subsequently laid up in the National Defense Reserve Fleet, James River Group, Lee Hall, Virginia. Azimech was sold for $80,007 on 12 September 1972, to Isaac Varela. She was delivered 8 December 1972, and subsequently scrapped in Spain.

== Military awards and honors ==
Azimech won one battle stars for her World War II service:

- Okinawa Gunto operation (Assault and occupation of Okinawa Gunto, 18 April to 7 May 1945)

Azimech's crew was eligible for the following medals:

- American Campaign Medal
- Asiatic-Pacific Campaign Medal (1)
- World War II Victory Medal

== Notes ==
Citations

== Bibliography ==
Online resources

- "Azimech". Dictionary of American Naval Fighting Ships. Naval History and Heritage Command. 19 June 2015. This article incorporates text from this source, which is in the public domain.
- "Kaiser Permanente No. 2, Richmond CA". ShipbuildingHistory.com. 13 October 2010.
- "USS Azimech (AK-124)". NavSource. 13 June 2014.
- "MARY PATTEN". United States Department of Transportation. Archived from the original on 12 December 2019.
