= USS West Point (ID-3254) =

Cargo ship of the United States Navy

History

United States
- Name: USS West Point
- Namesake: West Point, New York
- Builder: J. F. Duthie and Company, Seattle, Washington
- Launched: 15 October 1917
- Completed: January 1918
- Acquired: 5 August 1918
- Commissioned: 8 August 1918
- Decommissioned: 24 April 1919
- Fate: Returned to U.S. Shipping Board
- Notes: Operated as commercial cargo ship SS Westerner from 1919; Scrapped 1938

General characteristics
- Type: Cargo ship
- Displacement: 12,262 long tons (12,459 t)
- Length: 423 ft 0 in (128.93 m)
- Beam: 54 ft 0 in (16.46 m)
- Draft: 24 ft 1 in (7.34 m) (mean)
- Depth: 29 ft 9 in (9.07 m)
- Propulsion: One 2,700-ihp (1.864-mW) triple-expansion steam engine
- Speed: 10 knots (19 km/h; 12 mph)
- Complement: 124
- Armament: 1 × 6-inch (152-mm) gun; 1 × 6-pounder (2.7 kg) gun

The first USS West Point (ID-3254) was a cargo ship of the United States Navy that served during World War I and its immediate aftermath.

== Construction and acquisition ==
West Point was laid down as the Design 1013 steel-hulled commercial cargo ship War Leopard by J. F. Duthie and Company in Seattle, Washington, for the United States Shipping Board. She was delivered to the Shipping Board in January 1918.

On 5 August 1918, West Point was transferred to the U.S. Navy for World War I service. Assigned the naval registry identification number 3254, she was commissioned on 8 August 1918 as USS West Point (ID-3254) at Brooklyn, New York.

== Navy career ==
Assigned to the Naval Overseas Transportation Service, West Point departed New York City on 21 August 1918 bound for France with a cargo of 6,884 tons of general United States Army supplies. Arriving at Brest, France, on 7 September 1918, she moved to Pauillac the same day to discharge her cargo.

Making a return voyage to the United States, she arrived at New York City on 23 October 1918, loaded 5,532 tons of general U.S. Army supplies and departed on 4 November 1918 for Le Verdon-sur-Mer, France. During the crossing, the signing of the armistice with Germany on 11 November 1918 ended the war.

Arriving at Le Verdon-sur-Mer on 23 November 1918, West Point unloaded and headed for the United States East Coast on 6 December 1918. She subsequently made one more voyage with cargo for Europe, departing Boston, Massachusetts, on 18 January 1919, unloading her cargo from 2 to 12 February 1919 at Brest, taking on 1,620 tons of steel rails, and reaching Newport News, Virginia, on 13 March 1919. Soon thereafter, she departed Newport News for Boston.

== Decommissioning and disposal ==
West Point was decommissioned at Boston on 24 April 1919 and was transferred back to the U.S. Shipping Board as SS West Point. She was scrapped in Hamburg, Germany in 1938.
