= J. F. Duthie & Company =

Defunct shipyard off Harbor Island, Seattle, USA

Coordinates: 47.57428°N 122.34644°W

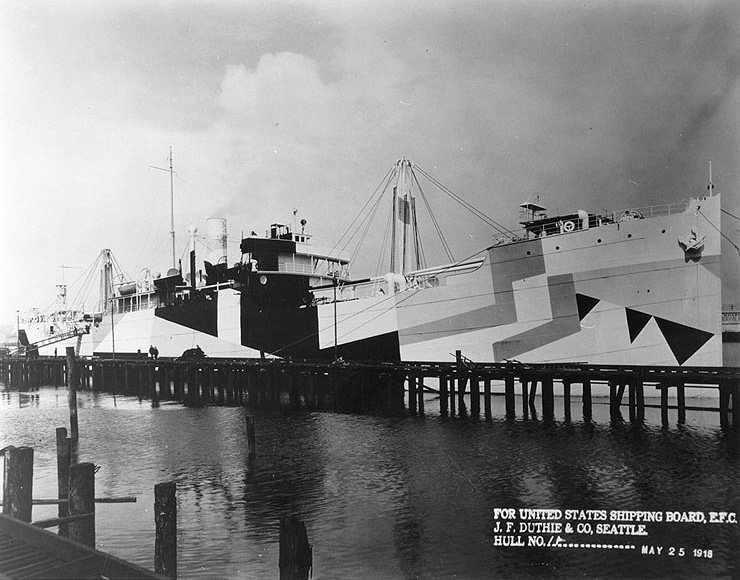
- West Bridge, one of the "West" boats built at J. F. Duthie & Company, shortly before her completion in May 1918
- Founded: c. 1911 in Seattle
- Founder: J. F. Duthie
- Headquarters: Harbor Island, Seattle, Washington, U.S.
- Products: Ships

J. F. Duthie & Company was a small shipyard located on the east side of Harbor Island in Seattle, Washington. It was reportedly organized in 1911 (although there is no mention of it on the 1912 Baist map at the location where the shipyard would be built) and expanded to 4 slipways on 25 acres (10 ha) of property in World War I to build cargo ships for the United Kingdom, France and Norway, but those resources were eventually all diverted at the behest of the United States Shipping Board (USSB). Work on the new plant started on 10 September 1916 and the first keel was laid on 29 November the same year. At that time, the new Skinner & Eddy plant across the water was already launching its first two ships: Niels Nielsen (21 September) and Hanna Nielsen (23 October).

Some 24 of the 33 ships built at J. F. Duthie were the "West boats," a series of steel-hulled cargo ships built for the USSB on the West Coast of the United States as part of the World War I war effort, with 12 requisitioned and 12 built under contract, 16% of the steel tonnage built in Puget Sound for the USSB. Duthie was supplied with boilers by Willamette Iron and Steel Works of Portland, Oregon.

After the war, Wallace F. Duthie, the son of the founder J. F. Duthie, organized the dismantling of the shipbuilding facilities. Wallace died in 1922 at age 23.

In 1928 the company's name was changed to Wallace Bridge Company. It built structural steel for local projects, including the Washington Athletic Club building in 1930.

== Notable ships built at J. F. Duthie & Company ==
Among the first 7 boats built, before the Federal Government dominated the shipbuilding industry, was the steam ferry Leschi, which after an illustrious career capsized during Reagan's second term.

Requisitioned by USSB
Yard#	Original	Owner	Renamed To	Launched (Note: See List of ship launches in 1917 and List of ship launches in 1918 for references)	Delivered	Marad	Fate (Note: Ships listed as "scrapped 19xx" were only operated by the USSB)
8	War Leopard	Shipping Controller	West Point	2 Sep 17	Jan 18		scrapped 1938
9	Hallbjorg	P. Kloppe, Oslo	Westerner	Nov 17	Feb 18		scrapped 1935
10	War General	Shipping Controller	Westfield	8 Dec 17	Feb 18		scrapped 1930
17	War Port	Shipping Controller	Western King	3 Jan 18	Mar 18		scrapped 1938
15	War Moon	Shipping Controller	Westboro	26 Mar 18	Apr 18		USSR 1945
11	War Topaz	Shipping Controller	West Bridge	24 Apr 18	May 18		USSR 1945
14	War Sun	Shipping Controller	Westover	17 Feb 18	May 18		torpedoed 1918
12	War Emerald	Shipping Controller	Western Sea	25 May 18	Jun 18		scrapped 1931
16	Viviam	French Line	Western Star	4 Jul 18	Aug 18		scrapped 1935
18	War Disk	Shipping Controller	Western Cross	4 Jul 18	Aug 18		scrapped 1931
19	War Ruby	Shipping Controller	Western Hope	29 Jul 18	Sep 18		scrapped 1932
20	Petain	French Line	Westpool	21 Sep 18	Oct 18		UK 1941, torpedoed 1941

In November 1918, World War I came to an end. In February of 1919, Seattle workers went on strike.

- 12 of 111 Design 1013 ships (USSB contracts 224, 334; 3 cancellations)

Yard#	USSB#	Name	Launched (Note: See List of ship launches in 1918 and 1919 for references)	Delivered	Marad	Lend-Lease
21	1471	West Helix	14 Dec 18			Y
22	1472	West Hembrie	29 Mar 19	17 May 19		Y
23	1473	West Hematite	26 Apr 19	13 Jun 19		
24	1474	West Henshaw	2 Jun 19	14 Jul 19		Y
25	1475	West Hepburn	21 Jun 19	2 Aug 19		Y
26	1476	West Herkimer / Seattle Spirit	16 July 19	16 Aug 19		
27	1477	West Herrick / Dewey	23 Aug 19	30 Sep 19		
28	1478	West Hesperia / Deuel	27 Sep 19	11 Nov 19		
29	1479	West Hesseltine	22 Nov 19			Y
30	1480	West Ivan	20 Dec 19			
31	2602	West Campgaw				
32	2603	West Mahwah				

- For the Coastwise SS Co
  - Griffco (Sep 20)
  - SS Griffdu (Oct 20, last ship built)

Conversions of Japan-built USSB contract ships to oil burners during 1920: Eastern Crown, Eastern Dawn, Eastern Glen, Eastern Exporter for total of $338,094 on USSB account.

== Shipyard ==
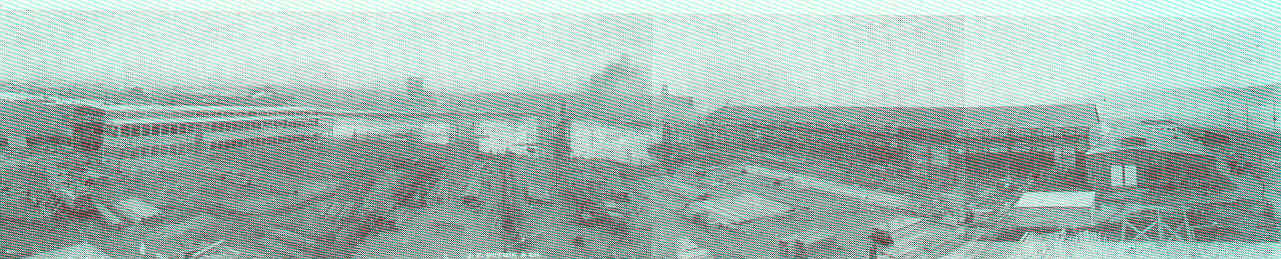
Duthie plant on the East Waterway of the Duwamish, 1917.
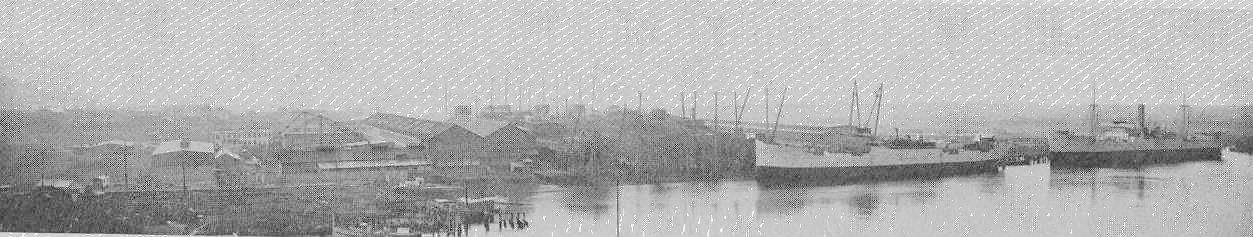
View from the water
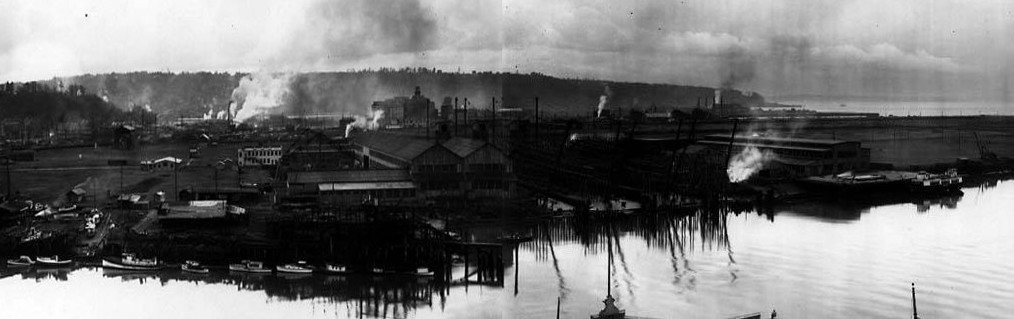
View from the water, 1917

== See also ==
- Category:Ships built by J. F. Duthie & Company
- List of structures on Elliott Bay
