= Sudden & Christenson Company =

Passengers and Shipping Company

- Company type: Joint-stock company
- Industry: Shipping, Passenger, Lumber
- Founded: 1899 in San Francisco, California, United States
- Defunct: 1965
- Area served: west coast and far east
- Key people: Edwin A. Christenson; Charles Sudden; D. Walter Rasor
- Subsidiaries: Arrow Line

Sudden & Christenson Company was a shipping and lumber company founded in 1899. Edwin A. Christenson and Charles Sudden of San Francisco, California started the company and shipping line to supply northwest lumber to cities on the east coast, west coast and far east. The ships would return with goods and passengers from the remote ports. Some of the ships also had passenger service on the upper decks. Sudden & Christenson Company and Los Angeles Steamship Company-United American Line started a joint venture called the Arrow Line in 1926. Arrow Line operated from Northwest Pacific Coast Ports and Argentina, Brazil and Uruguay. Sudden & Christenson's San Francisco Headquarters was at 110 Market Street with docks at Pier 15. Sudden & Christenson Company was incorporated in California in 1903. The Sudden & Christenson company dissolved in 1944 and Sudden & Christenson, Inc was founded to pay of the liability of franchise taxes, and operated till dissolved in 1965. Charles Sudden died in 1913 and Edwin Christenson became president with D. Walter Rasor as vice president. The company started with schooners and added steamships. During World War I Sudden & Christenson operated Merchant navy ships for the United States Shipping Board. During World War II Sudden & Christenson was active with charter shipping with the Maritime Commission and War Shipping Administration. Sudden & Christenson had docks in San Francisco, Vancouver, Seattle, Portland, Astoria, Los Angeles and Yokohama, Kobe, Shanghai, Dalian and Tsingtao. Far East ports were a joint venture with the North China Line. In late 1950s came the more cost-effective loading and unloading system, container shipping. The Sudden & Christenson fleet, now aged and on an obsolete system, put the company in decline, closing in 1965.

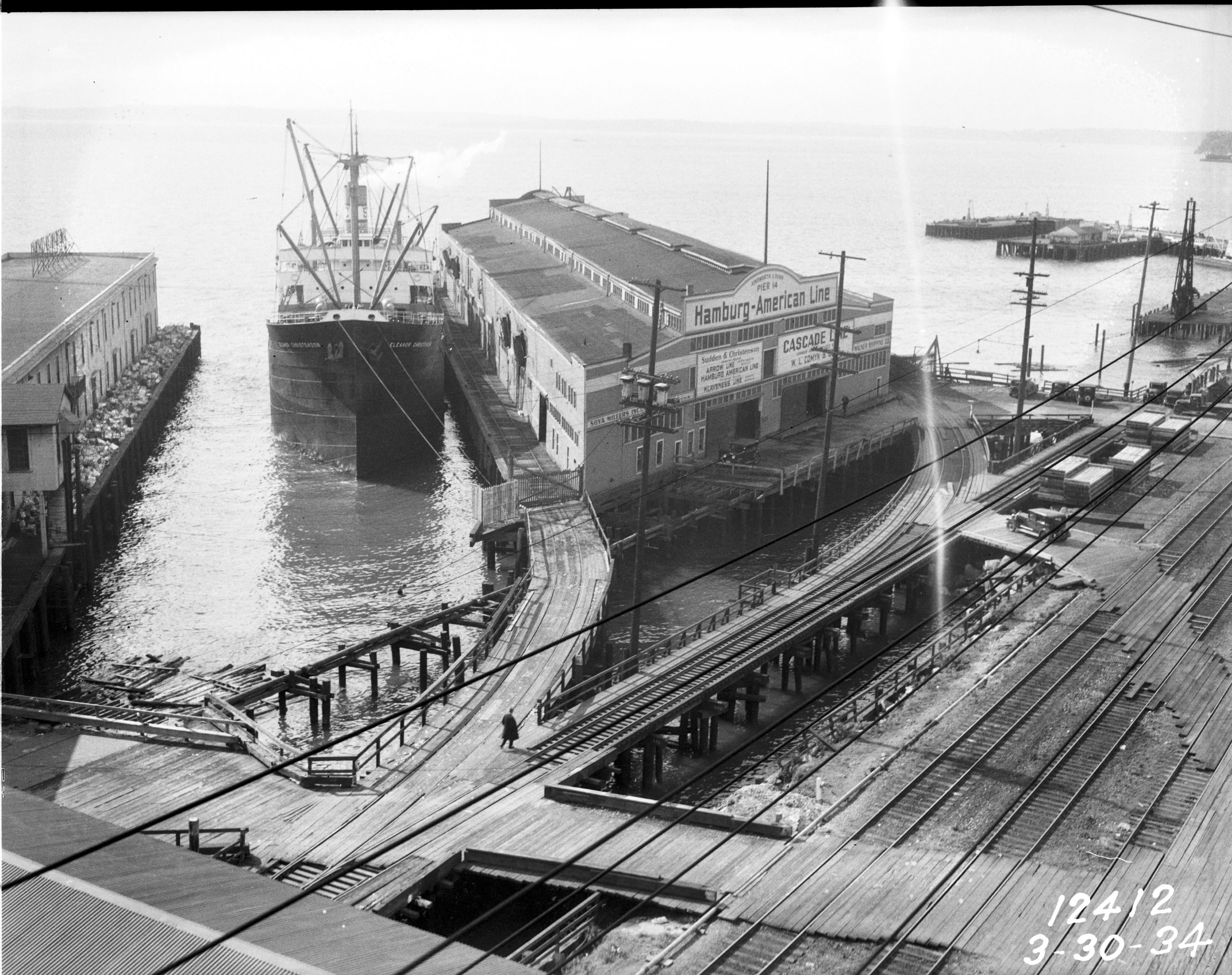
Sudden & Christenson dock in Seattle, Washington in 1934. At railroad Avenue (now Alaskan Way) and Pier 14 (now Pier 70)

== Sudden & Christenson ships ==
Sudden & Christenson and Arrow Line ships:

- Sophie Christenson, a 1901 schooner, 675 gross tons; 180.6' x 38.9' x 13.4', built by Hall Brothers at Pt. Blakely, WA.
- Brooklyn, a wooden steam schooner, built in 1902 by J. Lindstrom of Aberdeen, Washington, a 250 horsepower, 2-cylinder compound engine, sank in 1930.
- Slielton
- Norwood, built in 1904 by Hall Bros. Marine Railway & Shipbuilding Co., 760 tons
- Edna Christenson (was Algoa and John A. Hooper) was built by Harlan & Hollingsworth in Wilmington DE. Purchased in 1927, sank on 24 January 1947 as SS Hu Kiang
- Ruby, three-masted schooner, built in 1902 by J. W. Dickie & Sons 345 ton, sold 1914.
- Charles Christenson 839 gross, built in 1919 at West Hepburn. (sold renamed Plekhanov)
- Carl Christensen
- Edwin Christianson
- Cecilia Sudden, a four-masted schooner, 643 tons built at Fairhaven, Calif. by the Bendixsen Shipbuilding Cobuilt in 1902, sold in 1915.
- Helen Whittier, built in 1918 by Skinner & Eddy, Owned from 1929 to 1938. Sank by U-132 in 1942.
- John Palmer, a four-masted barkentine built in 1900, 1187 ton, sold in 1916
- Tara
- Montoso, built in 1911 by Newport News Shipbuilding (US Navy 1918 to 1919) .
- Espada, Schooner built in 1902 by Bendixsen, 777 tons, sank in 1919
- Alvarado, built in 1914 by Craig in Long Beach, Ca. Ran aground off Marshfield, Ore. with cargo of lumber in 1945.
- Willapa, 779 tons built in 1908 by Dickie Bros, wrecked near Vivorilla Cays in 1916.
- Chehalis, built in 1901 by Bendixsen, 663 tons, scrapped 1938
- Grays Harbor, built in 1907 by Lindstrom Shipbuilding, 659 tons
- Raymond 596 gross, wood steam schooner,
- Edna 1783 gross (was Mazallan) built by Laxevaags Maskin & Jernskibs in Bergen, Norway in 1903, purchased in 1914.
- Caoba 579 gross, wood ship built in 1906, sank in 1926, with load of lumber
- Carmel 633 gross, 1906; steam schooner
- Dumaru, built by Grant Smith-Porter of Portland, 1752 tons, sank October 1918.
- Coquille River, wooden steam schooner built in 1896 at Prosper, Oregon by William Muller and C. Christensen. 415 tons and 141' long, sold in 1905.
- USS West Bridge, also called Barbara Cates, and Pan Gulf.

== Shipping Board ships ==
Shipping Board World War 1 ships operated by Sudden & Christenson:

- West Kader, built by Builder Western Pipe & Steel, in 1919. Sank during World War 2.
- West Cahokia, built in 1920, sank 12 May 1942 by Uboat U-94 5720 gross, a Design 1019 ship
- Crown City, built in 1920 by Los Angeles Shipbuilding & Dry Dock, 5490 gross, a Design 1013 ship
- Westboro 5769 gross, a Design 1013 ship
- Pansa 4839 gross, a Design 1014 ship
- West Hesseltine, built by "J. F. Duthie & Company", Seattle, Washington in January 1920. Belorussia-class cargo ship, 5588 gross, a Design 1013 ship
- SS Topa Topa, built by Los Angeles Shipbuilding & Dry Dock Company in 1920. Torpedoed and sunk in August 1942 by U-66.
- Haynie 6037 gross, a Design 1015 ship

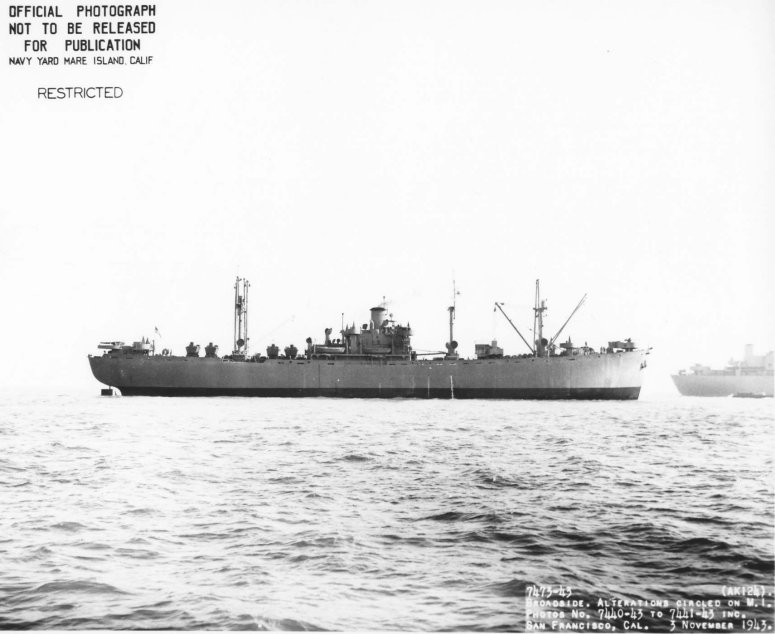
USS Azimech

== World War II ==
Sudden & Christenson operated ships for World War II: The ship was run by its Sudden & Christenson Company crew and the US Navy supplied United States Navy Armed Guards to man the deck guns and radio. The most common armament mounted on these merchant ships were the MK II 20mm Oerlikon autocannon and the 3"/50, 4"/50, and 5"/38 deck guns.

  - Victory ships:
- SS Hobbs Victory, Sank in battle April 6, 1945 at Kerama Islands, Okinawa, 12 of the crew were killed.
- USNS Dalton Victory (T-AK-256)
- Lafayette Victory
- Loyola Victory
- USNS Sunnyvale (T-AGM-5)
- Belgium Victory
- Burbank Victory
- Canton Victory
- Wesleyan Victory
- Muncie Victory
- New World Victory
  - Liberty ships:
- SS Anne Hutchinson, Torpedoed and lost off South Africa 1942
- Jose Marti
- Josiah Snelling
- Juan Pablo Duarte
- Norman Hapgood
- Chief Joseph
- Chung Shan
- SS Marcus Daly damaged in attack in 1944 in Philippines.
- Simon Benson
- John Adams Sank May 5, 1942, torpedoed by Japanese submarine I-21 off New Caledonia, was on passage Noumea to Brisbane with drummed aviation fuel
- James Withycombe sank Dec. 19, 1943, ran aground off Cristobal, Panama.
- SS Junipero Serra

  - Crater-class cargo ship:
- USS Azimech
  - Other
- Roseville, was a Norway ship.
- Anne Hanify, Built in 1920, lumber schooner SS Anne Hanify at Kruse & Banks Shipbuilding, North Bend, OR.

== See also ==
- Richmond Shipyards
