= SS Empire Adur =

Steamship built in 1920

History
- Name: 1920-1935: Griffdu; 1935-1940: Noyo; 1940-1942: Nang Suang Nawa; 1942-1948: Empire Adur; 1948-1955: Nang Suang Nawa
- Owner: 1920-1925: Universal Steamship & Barge Co, Seattle; 1925-1935: The Charles Nelson Co, San Francisco; 1935-1940: Union Lumber Co, San Francisco; 1940-1942: Thai Niyom Panich Co, Bangkok; 1942-1948: Ministry of War Transport; 1948-1955: Thai Maritime Navigation Co
- Operator: Owner operated except:-; Singapore Straits Steamship Co (1942-48)
- Port of registry: (United States) San Francisco (1920-40); (Thailand) Bangkok (1940-42); (United Kingdom) Singapore (1942); (United Kingdom) London (1942-48); (Thailand) Bangkok (1948-55)
- Builder: J F Duthie & Co, Seattle
- Yard number: 37
- Launched: 20 September 1920
- Completed: October 1920
- Identification: US official number 220755 (1920-40); UK Official Number 173071 (1942-48); Code Letters KJLP (1920-40); Code letters VSTP (1940-42); Code letters BFBW (1942-48)
- Fate: Sank whilst under tow to scrapyard, 23 November 1955.

General characteristics
- Tonnage: 1,479 GRT
- Length: 219 ft 9 in (66.98 m)
- Beam: 40 ft 1 in (12.22 m)
- Depth: 18 ft 5 in (5.61 m)
- Propulsion: 1 x triple expansion steam engine (Hendricks Manufacturing Co, Seattle).
- Speed: 11 knots (20 km/h)

Location where Nang Suang Nawa foundered.

SS Empire Adur was a 1,479 ton steamship which was built in 1920 as the Griffdu. She was renamed Noyo in 1935 and in 1940 was sold to Thailand, being renamed Nang Suang Nawa, being seized in 1942 and renamed Empire Adur. She was sold to Thailand in 1948, reverting to Nang Suang Nawa and was lost at sea in 1955 while being towed to Hong Kong for scrapping.

== History ==
Griffdu was built by J. F. Duthie & Company, Seattle, Washington. She was the 37th and last ship built by Duthie. Griffdu was launched on 20 September 1920, and completed the following month. Her original owner was the Universal Steamship & Barge Co, Seattle. In 1925, Griffdu was sold to The Charles Nelson Co, San Francisco, serving with them for ten years. In 1935, Griffdu was sold to the Union Lumber Co, San Francisco, who renamed her Noyo. She served for five years before being sold to the Thai Niyom Panich Co, (Thai Navigation Co Ltd) Bangkok, who reflagged her and renamed her Nang Suang Nawa. In 1942, Nang Suang Nawa was seized, and passed to the Ministry of War Transport and renamed Empire Adur. She was placed under the management of the Singapore Straits Steamship Company.

Empire Adur was not a popular member of convoys due to the condition of her boilers, and the fact that she would belch black smoke and flames from her funnel. The convoy escorts threatened to ask Empire Adur to leave the convoy or sink her. Another of her faults was that the nut holding the steering wheel on often came loose, with the result that the wheel came off in the helmsman's hands.

Empire Adur joined Convoy KMS 21 at Gibraltar on 29 July 1943, arriving at Port Said on 9 August. Empire Adur had a final destination of Tripoli and Alexandria.

In 1948, Empire Adur was sold to the Thai Maritime Navigation Co, Bangkok and regained her former name of Nang Suang Nawa. She served for a further seven years but went missing under tow by the Philippines registered tug Albacore to Hong Kong for scrapping. Both vessels were presumed lost. Her last reported position was north of the Paracel Islands at 17°56′N 113°45′E on 23 November 1955.

== Official number and code letters ==
Official Numbers were a forerunner to IMO Numbers.

Griffdu and Noyo had the US Official Number 220755. Nang Suang Nawa and Empire Adur had the UK Official Number 166215.

Griffdu and Noyo used the Code Letters KJLP. Nang Suang Nawa used the Code Letters VSTP. Empire Adur used the Code Letters BFBW.
