= Edward N. Hurley =

2nd Chairman of the Federal Trade Commission (1864–1933)

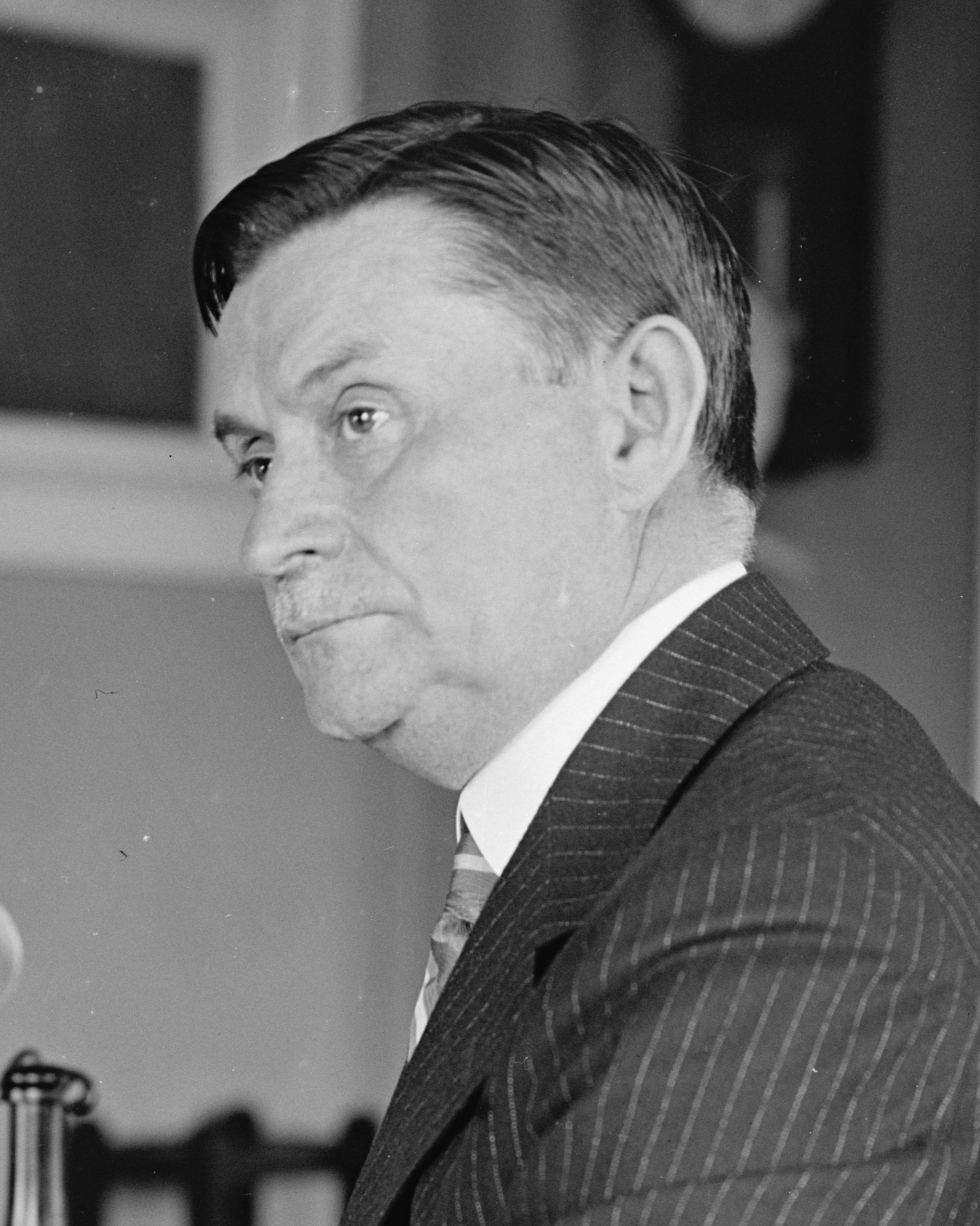
- Hurley in the 1910s

Chair of the Federal Trade Commission
- In office July 1, 1916 – January 31, 1917
- President: Woodrow Wilson
- Preceded by: Joseph E. Davies
- Succeeded by: William J. Harris

Personal details
- Born: Edward Nash Hurley; July 31, 1864 Galesburg, Illinois, U.S.
- Died: November 14, 1933 (aged 69) Chicago, Illinois, U.S.
- Resting place: Calvary Cemetery, Evanston, Illinois, U.S.
- Party: Democratic
- Occupation: Businessman; inventor

Edward Nash Hurley (July 31, 1864 – November 14, 1933) was an American businessman and inventor who served as the second chairman of the Federal Trade Commission from July 1, 1916 to January 31, 1917. He was of Irish descent.

== Biography ==
Hurley was born in Galesburg, Illinois, on July 31, 1864. He finished high school at 17 and went to work for the railroad, ascending from shopman to engineer, and eventually becoming assistant to the president of the Brotherhood of Locomotive Engineers and Trainmen. In 1897 he started producing pneumatic tools together with a couple of brothers and made US$125 selling the British patent. In 1907 he became president of the National Bank of Wheaton and then founded the Hurley Machine Company, which produced vacuum cleaners and washing and ironing machines. In 1914 he was named to the Federal Trade Commission and in 1915 he became its chairman. Hurley also served on the Red Cross War Council, the War Trade Board, and as chairman of the U.S. Shipping Board. In 1919, he was awarded the Distinguished Service Medal by the War Department for his work for the Shipping Board during World War I.

He helped professor T. G. Masaryk in a question of Czechoslovak legions and a foundation of a Czechoslovak state in 1918.

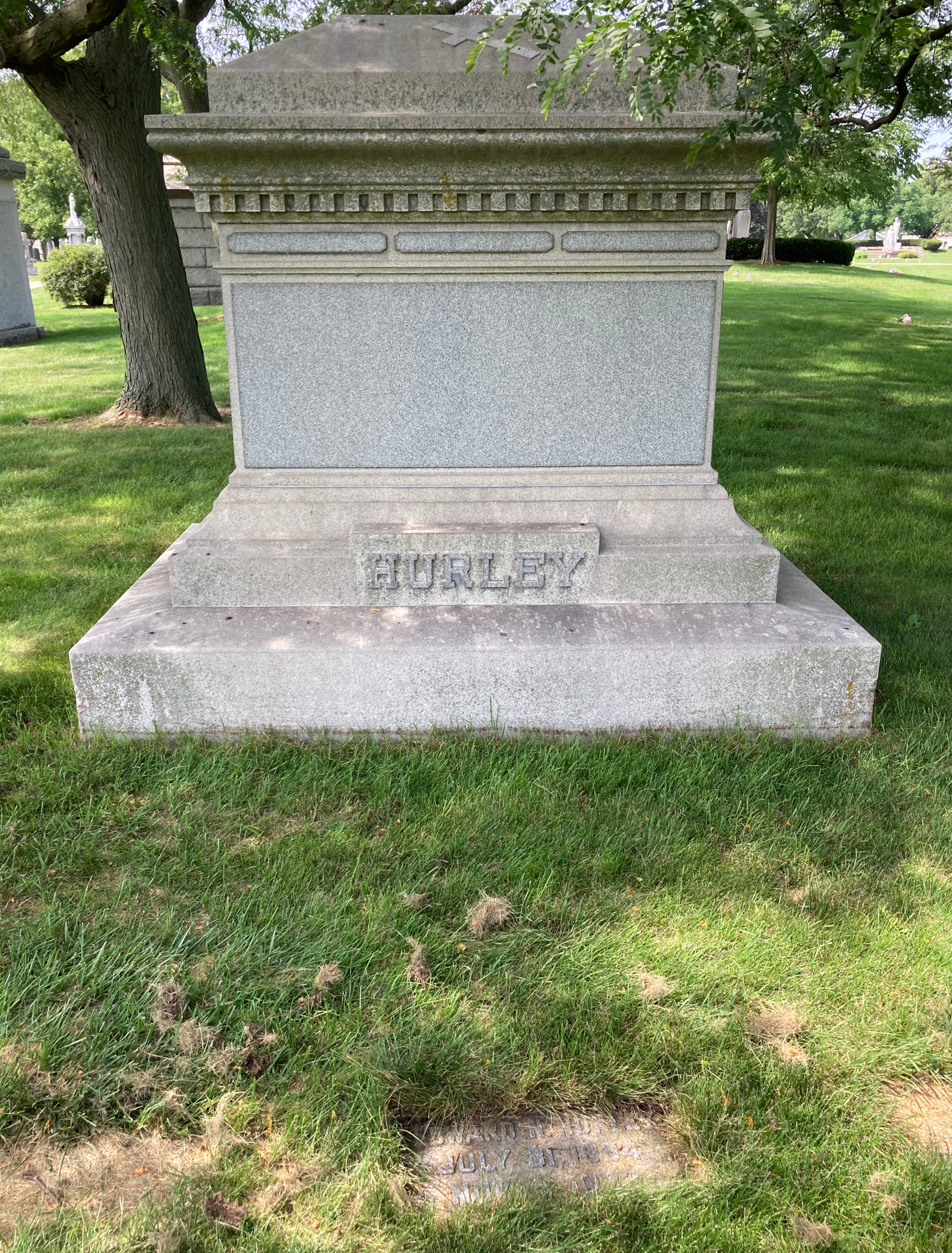
Hurley's grave at Calvary Cemetery

In 1918 with Professor Robert DeLoach he joined the Vagabonds, a group consisting of John Burroughs, Thomas Edison, Henry Ford and Harvey Firestone who made a camping trip to the Appalachian Mountains.

In 1926 he received the Laetare Medal and in 1933 he donated $200,000 to the University of Notre Dame for a new building for the college, which was named Hurley Hall.

== Death ==
He died in Chicago on November 14, 1933. He is buried at Calvary Cemetery in Evanston.

== Works ==
- Banking and Credit in Argentina, Brazil, Chile, and Peru. U.S. Government Printing Office. 1914.
- Awakening of Business. Doubleday, Page. 1916.
- The New Merchant Marine. Century. 1920.
- The Bridge to France. Philadelphia & London: J. B. Lippincott Company. 1927.
