= SS West Maximus =

Steel-hulled US cargo ship

Coordinates: 55°10′N 43°0′W

- West Maximus

History

United States
- Name: West Maximus
- Owner: 1919: US Shipping Board; 1936: US Maritime Commission
- Port of registry: Seattle
- Builder: Skinner & Eddy
- Yard number: 35 (USSB 1188)
- Launched: 28 December 1918
- Completed: 1919
- Acquired: April 1919
- Identification: US official number 217861; 1919: Naval Registry ID-3924; until 1933: code letters LQRD; by 1934: call sign KEDQ
- Fate: sunk by torpedo, 5 May 1943

General characteristics
- Type: Design 1013 cargo ship
- Tonnage: 8,595 DWT (8,800 nom.); 5,561 GRT (5,600 nom.); 4,006 NRT
- Displacement: 12,225 tons
- Length: 423 ft 9 in (129.16 m); 409.6 ft (124.8 m) bp
- Beam: 54.2 ft (16.5 m)
- Draft: 24 ft 2 in (7.37 m)
- Depth: 27.1 ft (8.3 m)
- Decks: 2
- Installed power: 1 × turbine
- Propulsion: Single propeller
- Speed: 11.5 kn (21.3 km/h)
- Complement: 62 (WWII)
- Sensors & processing systems: submarine signalling

SS West Maximus was a steel-hulled cargo ship built for the United States Shipping Board's emergency wartime construction program during World War I. Completed too late to see service in the war, West Maximus spent the interwar years in commercial service.

After the United States' entry into World War II in December 1941, West Maximus took part in wartime convoys. She was torpedoed and sunk by the German submarine U-264 while sailing to the United States on 5 May 1943, a casualty of the convoy battle regarded as the turning point in the Battle of the Atlantic.

== Construction and design ==
West Maximus was built in Seattle in 1918–19 at the No. 2 Plant of the Skinner & Eddy Corporation—the 20th in a series of 24 Design 1013 cargo ships built by the company for the United States Shipping Board's emergency wartime shipbuilding program. Initially intended for commission into the U.S. Navy as an auxiliary, West Maximus was assigned the navy identification code ID-3924, but the proposed commission was later withdrawn, probably because the war ended before the ship's completion. The ship was launched on 28 December 1918, about six weeks after the end of the war, and delivered to the USSB in April 1919.

West Maximus is listed in mercantile records as having a deadweight tonnage of 8,595 tons (8,800 nominal) and a gross register tonnage of 5,561 (5,600 nominal). Her lengths were 423 feet 9 inches (129.16 m) overall and 409.6 feet (124.8 m) registered. Her beam was 54.2 feet (16.5 m), her depth was 27.1 feet (8.3 m), and her draft was 24 feet 2 inches (7.37 m). She was powered by a steam turbine driving a single screw, delivering a service speed of 11 to 12 knots (20 to 22 km/h).

== Service history ==
Entering service shortly after the end of World War I, West Maximus was put into commercial service by the USSB. In the early 1920s, West Maximus was engaged in service from both Europe and South America to the United States. Shipping records show that West Maximus arrived in New York from Stettin, Germany in June 1921, and completed another voyage from Montevideo, Uruguay in November. Newspaper records indicate that West Maximus made several voyages between Baltimore, Maryland and Manchester, England in late 1922. The following year, the vessel was again engaged in service between various ports in Europe and New York, arriving from Danzig via Southampton on 21 June, and from Helsingborg, Sweden on August 11.

After this, West Maximus became one of the hundreds of American ships laid up in U.S. ports because of the postwar oversupply of shipping. She remained laid up at New Orleans until mid-1940, when she became one of a batch of 10 ships reconditioned and placed back into service by the US Maritime Commission to help alleviate a shortfall in tonnage caused by shipping losses in the early part of World War II. Several other Skinner & Eddy–built ships, including Eldena, Polybius and the West Maximus sister ships West Cressey and West Elcasco, were also placed back into service from the New Orleans fleet at this time. Following her recondition, West Maximus was transferred to management of the Moore-McMormack shipping line of Baltimore, and the vessel was still in service with that company when the United States entered the war in December 1941.

=== World War II ===
After the US's entry into World War II in December 1941, West Maximus became engaged in convoy duty. The ship participated in her first wartime convoy in mid-1942, when on 17 June she loaded a cargo of steel and general goods at Baltimore bound for Liverpool, England. From Boston the vessel proceeded in convoy to Halifax and Sydney, Nova Scotia, where on the 26th she left in an escorted convoy for Liverpool, arriving at her destination 11 July. After unloading her cargo, the ship commenced the return to the U.S. on 19 July, but on 4 August the convoy in which she was sailing was dispersed and West Maximus proceeded alone to New York.

At New York, West Maximus loaded a cargo of general goods again bound for Liverpool, leaving for Halifax 19 August. On 22 August, West Maximus left Halifax for Liverpool with a large escorted convoy, arriving at her destination 7 September. With her cargo unloaded, West Maximus joined an escorted convoy for the return to New York, leaving on 26 September and arriving on 17 October.

==== Rescue at sea ====
From New York, West Maximus left in an unescorted convoy to South America, arriving at Guantanamo, Cuba 19 November and Trinidad on the 24th. From there she continued on December 5 to Rio de Janeiro, Brazil. On this voyage, her Captain, Otto Heitman, saw what he first feared might be an enemy submarine, but soon realized was an empty lifeboat. On further investigation, two more lifeboats were spotted, containing 41 survivors from the torpedoed UK motor ship Teesbank. After rescuing the survivors, West Maximus continued to Rio, arriving December 22. Here, as a token of gratitude and a memento for the rescue, he was presented with a silver cigarette case by British members of the Rio community.

==== Return to Atlantic service ====
Leaving Rio December 31, West Maximus returned to Trinidad and thence to Guantanamo, where she sailed in an unescorted convoy on 29 January for New York, arriving 4 February. At New York, West Maximus loaded a general cargo again bound for Liverpool. Leaving in an escorted convoy on 14 March, the ship reached her destination on 3 April 1943.

==== Final voyage ====
After unloading her cargo at Liverpool, West Maximus prepared to return to the United States in what became her final voyage. On 21 April the ship joined Convoy ONS 5 for her return to the United States. A few days into the voyage, the convoy ran into a Force 10 gale and its speed was reduced to only three knots, allowing a wolf pack of 27 U-boats to gather for interception. The wolf pack attacked on the night of 4–5 May, and one of the first ships struck was West Maximus, hit by a torpedo from U-264 that blew off a large section of the ship's stern. The vessel remained afloat, but while her crew were waiting for rescue, U-264 fired two more torpedoes which struck the ship at 1.10 and 1.30 am respectively on 5 May, and West Maximus went down by the bows about ten minutes later. Six of the ship's complement of 62 were killed in the attack, including an officer, four crew members, and an armed guard. The survivors were rescued at 11am that morning by HMT Northern Spray (FY-129) and evacuated to St. Johns, arriving 8 May.

Convoy ONS 5 went on to lose a total of 12 ships to U-boat attack (one of which was West Madaket, a sister ship of West Maximus), but 13 U-boats were also damaged or destroyed in the battle. In spite of its heavy losses therefore, Convoy ONS 5 is considered to be the turning point in the Battle of the Atlantic, as U-boats from this point were to suffer increasingly heavy losses for steadily diminishing results.

== Bibliography ==
- Infield, Glenn B. (1958): Disaster at Bari, Chapter 6, Bantam Books. (Reprinted in 1988 with ISBN 978-0-553-27403-5).
- Jordan, Roger H. (2006): The World's Merchant Fleets, 1939: The Particulars And Wartime Fates of 6,000 Ships, Naval Institute Press, ISBN 978-1-59114-959-0.
- Dictionary of American Naval Fighting Ships, "West Maximus (Id. No. 3924)". Naval History and Heritage Command.
- Lloyd's Register of Shipping (PDF). Vol. II.–Steamers and Motorships of 300 tons gross and over. London: Lloyd's Register of Shipping. 1930 – via Southampton City Council.
- Lloyd's Register of Shipping (PDF). Vol. II.–Steamers and Motorships of 300 tons gross and over. London: Lloyd's Register of Shipping. 1934 – via Southampton City Council.
- Lloyd's Register of Shipping (PDF). Vol. II.–Steamers and Motorships of 300 tons gross and over. London: Lloyd's Register of Shipping. 1937 – via Southampton City Council.
