= USS West Elcasco =

Naval cargo ship

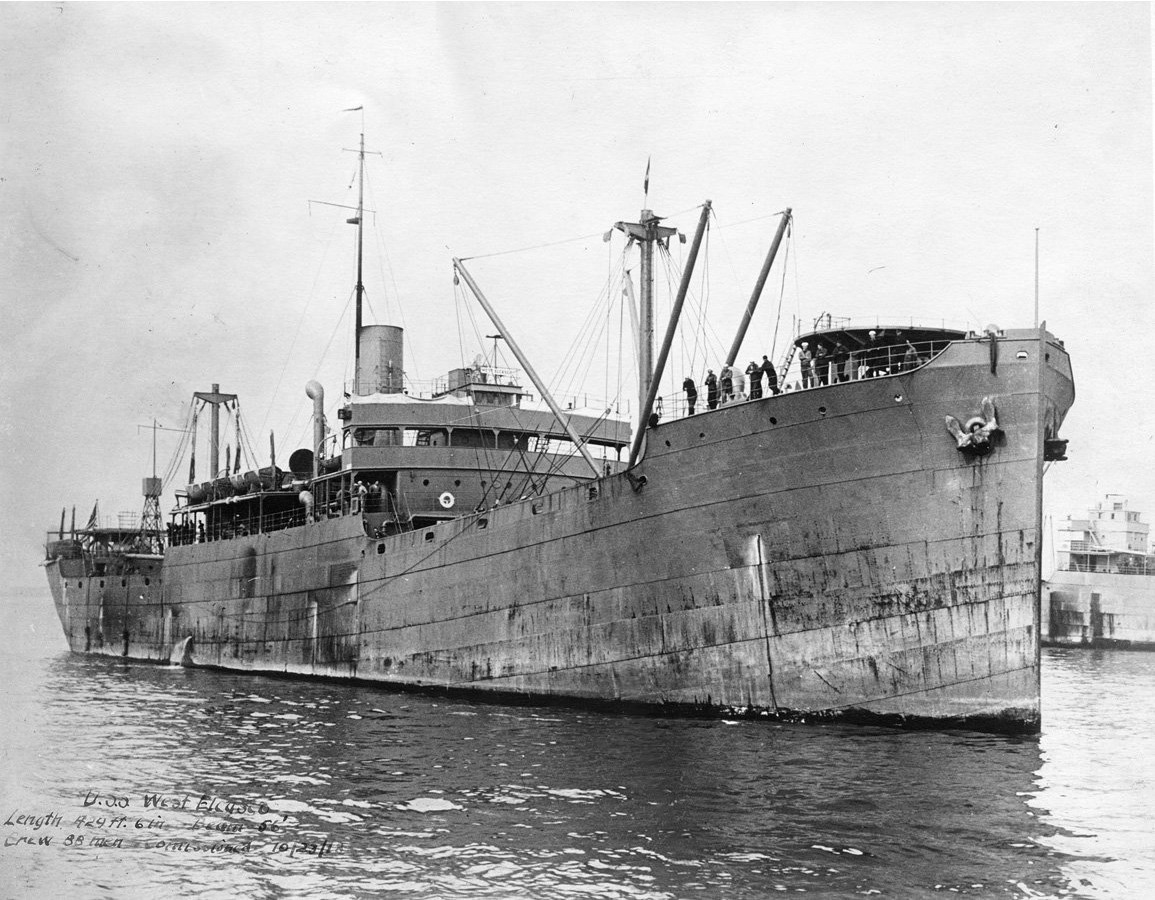
- USS West Elcasco at Philadelphia, March 1919

History

United States
- Name: USS West Elcasco
- Owner: U.S. Shipping Board 18; Mississippi Shipping Co. 30; U.S. Army 41
- Builder: Skinner & Eddy
- Yard number: 38 (USSB #1927)
- Launched: 21 September 1918
- Acquired: 23 October 1918
- Commissioned: 23 October 1918
- Decommissioned: 14 June 1919
- In service: 23 October 1918
- Out of service: 23 June 1942
- Renamed: USAT Major General Henry Gibbins, 1941
- Home port: New York (from 1930)
- Fate: Torpedoed and sunk off Key West, Florida, 23 June 1942

General characteristics
- Type: Design #1013 cargo ship
- Tonnage: 5,766 gross, 8,568 dwt
- Displacement: 12,200 tons
- Length: 423 ft 9 in (129.16 m); 410 ft 5 in (125.10 m) bp
- Beam: 54 ft (16 m)
- Draft: 24 ft 2 in (7.37 m)
- Depth of hold: 29 ft 9 in (9.07 m)
- Installed power: 1 × steam turbine
- Propulsion: Single screw
- Speed: 11.25 kn (20.84 km/h)
- Complement: 70 (in Naval service)
- Armament: WWI: none

USS West Elcasco (ID-3661) was a steel-hulled cargo ship which saw service as an auxiliary with the U.S. Navy in World War I and as an Army transport in World War II.

West Elcasco was commissioned into the Navy only weeks before the end of World War I, and the war ended before she had time to complete a single Navy mission. She subsequently undertook two relief missions to Europe in the immediate postwar period prior to decommission in 1919. Between the wars she operated as a merchant vessel.

The ship was reacquired for U.S. government service in World War II with the Army Transport Command, when she was renamed USAT Major General Henry Gibbins. Major General Henry Gibbins was torpedoed and sunk off Key West, Florida by German submarine U-158 on 23 June 1942.

== Design and construction ==
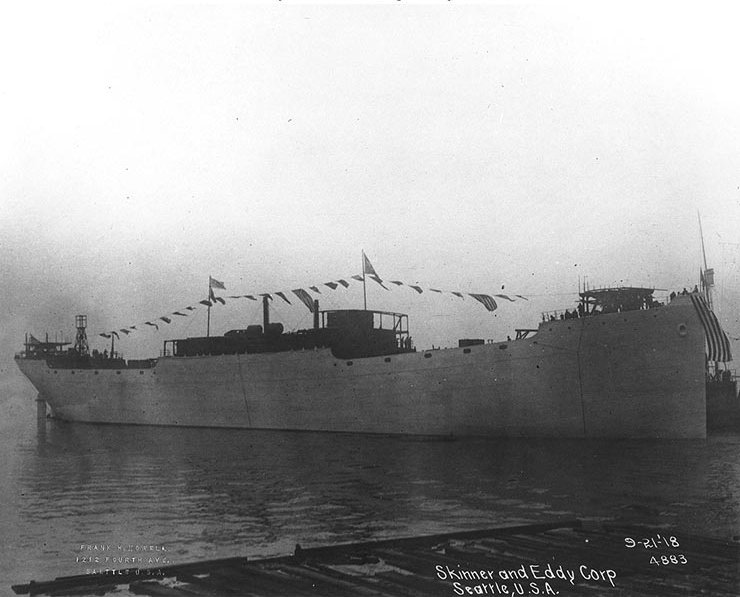
West Elcasco just after launch, before the completion of her superstructure

West Elcasco was built in Seattle, Washington in 1918 at the No. 2 Plant of the Skinner & Eddy Corporation—the second last in a series of 24 steel-hulled Design #1013 cargo ships built by Skinner & Eddy for the United States Shipping Board's emergency wartime shipbuilding program.

Nominally a vessel of 8,800 deadweight tons, West Elcasco is listed in mercantile records as having a deadweight tonnage of 8,568 tons and a gross register tonnage of 5,766. The ship had an overall length of 423 feet 9 inches, a beam of 54 feet and a draft of about 24 feet. West Elcasco was powered by a steam turbine driving a single screw propeller, delivering a service speed of between 10.5 and 11.25 knots.

== Service history ==
=== Naval service ===
West Elcasco was acquired by the Navy on 23 October 1918 on behalf of the Naval Overseas Transportation Service (NOTS), and commissioned the same day as USS West Elcasco (ID-3661).

Laden with a cargo of flour, West Elcasco departed Seattle on 31 October, bound for the east coast. After stopping briefly at San Pedro, California, she transited the Panama Canal and arrived at New York on 2 December. With her cargo consigned to European food relief, she got underway for Europe on 8 December and arrived at Gibraltar on the last day of 1918. From the strait, she proceeded to the Adriatic Sea and arrived at Trieste, Italy on 11 January 1919. After discharging part of her cargo there, West Elcasco shifted to Gallipoli, on the Dardanelles, where she delivered the remainder of her cargo. She then took on a cargo of depth charges and headed home on 15 February.

After her arrival at Philadelphia on 7 March, West Elcasco shifted to Boston and loaded a cargo of foodstuffs for France. She got underway on 8 April and delivered her cargo after arriving at Le Verdon-sur-Mer. Returning from Europe, via New York, to Boston on 9 June, West Elcasco was decommissioned on 14 June 1919 and transferred to the U.S. Shipping Board the same day.

=== Mercantile service ===
Little information is available regarding West Elcasco's movements in the interwar period, but the ship is known to have been active from 1919 through the mid-1920s in transatlantic service, when the ship transported passengers and cargo from various ports in Spain, France and Italy to the United States. West Elcasco was sold in 1930 to the Mississippi Shipping Co. and homeported at New York. With the reduction in international trade brought about by the Great Depression however, West Elcasco like many other U.S. ships of the era was eventually laid up by the Shipping Board for lack of work.

=== Return to Navy service ===
With the outbreak of World War II in 1939, shipping losses caused by U-boats created an increased demand for tonnage. To help meet this demand, the U.S. Maritime Commission (successor to the Shipping Board), in addition to its orders for new tonnage, decided to recondition and return to service a number of old Shipping Board vessels laid up between the wars. In July 1940, it was announced that West Elcasco would be reconditioned and placed back into service along with nine other ships, including four more Skinner & Eddy-built ships, Eldena, Polybius and West Elcasco's sister ships West Cressey and West Maximus, all of which had spent the latter part of the 1930s laid up at New Orleans. West Elcasco was assigned the hull classification symbol AK-33, but may not have been commissioned.

=== Army service ===
In 1941, the United States Army Quartermaster Corps acquired West Elcasco and renamed her USAT Major General Henry Gibbins, but the US Navy retained the ship on its ship list as Major General Henry Gibbins (AE-7), apparently due to a short-lived dispute over which service would be responsible for ammunition cargo ships. In February 1942, Major General Henry Gibbins, along with the SS Florida, transported 850 troops and their weapons to the oil refinery port of Aruba, Netherlands Antilles, disembarking their cargoes on the 11th. Major General Henry Gibbins was fortunately still safely in port when German submarines attacked shipping in the area on the 16th.

On 23 June 1942, Major General Henry Gibbins, sailing unescorted with a cargo of coffee, was attacked and sunk by U-158 about 375 miles west of Key West, Florida. The ship was hit on the port side by two torpedoes fired about twenty minutes apart, and sank shortly thereafter. The ship's crew of 47 along with her 21 army guards survived the attack, and were rescued within a day or two and taken to Pensacola, Florida.

== Bibliography ==
- Jordan, Roger H. (2006): The World's Merchant Fleets, 1939: The Particulars And Wartime Fates of 6,000 Ships, Naval Institute Press, ISBN 978-1-59114-959-0.
