= Altair (disambiguation) =

Altair is a star in the constellation Aquila.

Altair may also refer to:

== Organizations ==
- Altair Airlines, a regional airline that operated out of Philadelphia, Pa., US, from 1967 to 1982
- Altair Semiconductor, a developer of 4G cellular communication semiconductors
- Altair Nanotechnologies Inc., manufacturer of energy storage systems
- Altair Engineering, an American product design and development, engineering software and cloud computing software company
- 4th Army Aviation Regiment "Altair", Italy

== Entertainment ==
- Altair, a 1956 drama film
- Altair: A Record of Battles, a Japanese manga series
- Somewhere at the Bottom of the River Between Vega and Altair, an album by La Dispute

== Fiction ==
=== Fictional characters ===
- Altaïr Ibn-LaʼAhad, a character in the Assassin's Creed video game series
- Altair, a character in the video game Bomberman 64
- Altair the Black Knight, a character in the anime series Gear Fighter Dendoh
- Ratchet Altair, a character in the Sakura Wars universe
- Altair, a Mecha in the series Zegapain
- Altair, a form taken by the Japanese television character Kamen Rider Zeronos
- Altair, the name of one of Sheik Ilderim's horses in Ben Hur
- Altair, a mechanical bakugan in Bakugan new vestroia
- Altair, the name of a dragon in the video game Spyro The Dragon
- Altair, the main antagonist of the anime Re:Creators

=== Other uses in fiction ===
- Altair, a location in the Final Fantasy II video game
- Altair, a star in the Choose Your Own Adventure book, The Third Planet from Altair, by Edward Packard
- Altair IV, the planet on which the film Forbidden Planet is set
- Altair 4, a planet with almost no air, in Stephen King's Science Fiction book The Tommyknockers

== Places ==
- Altair, São Paulo, a city in Brazil
- Jabal al-Tair Island, an island in the Red Sea
- Altair, Texas, a town in Colorado County, Texas, US
- Altair (Building), Colombo, Sri-Lanka

== People ==
- Altair Gomes de Figueiredo (1938–2019), nickname Altair, Brazilian Football player
- Altaír Jarabo (born 1986), Mexican actress
- Altair Moraes (born 1969), Brazilian politician and former karateka
- Altaír Tejeda de Tamez (1922–2015), Mexican writer

== Technology ==
- Al-Ta'ir (satellite), an Iraqi satellite whose fate remains unknown
- Luch (satellite), a series of Russian relay satellites also known as Altair
- Altair 8800, known as the microcomputer that sparked the microcomputer revolution
  - Altair BASIC, a BASIC interpreter for the microcomputer
- Altair (rocket stage), a rocket engine used in several anti-satellite weapons

== Vehicles ==
- Altair (spacecraft), a lunar lander
- USS Altair, several US Navy ships
  - USNS Altair (T-AKR-291), later SS Altair (T-AKR-297), a cargo ship of the US Navy's Military Sealift Command
- Lockheed Altair, an aircraft
- Altair (yacht), a schooner designed by William Fife
- Beriev Be-200 or Beriev Be-200 Altair, a multipurpose amphibious aircraft
- Piper PiperJet Altaire, a single-engined very light jet
- Altair (ship), Mexican oceanographic research vessel

== Other uses ==
- Operation ALTAIR, a Canadian military operation
- Altair, a planet central to the New Age spiritual beliefs of Francis Younghusband
- Marine Scientific Research Institute of radioelectronics or MNIIRE Altair design bureau, developer of naval SA missile systems and radars
- ALTAIR, a radar tracking station on Roi-Namur island in the north part of the Kwajalein atoll in the Marshall Islands
- "Altair 4", a song by Blind Guardian on the album Tales from the Twilight World
- Altair magazine, an Australian science fiction magazine edited by Robert N. Stephenson (ran seven issues, the last being a double issue #6/7)

== See also ==
- Altar (disambiguation)
