= Alteration =

An Alteration is the act, process, or result of making a change or modification to something's structure, appearance, or character. It usually implies a slight but significant change rather than a complete replacement.

Other definitions may refer to:

- Alteration (music), the use of a neighboring pitch in the chromatic scale in place of its diatonic neighbor
  - Alteration, in the mensural notation used by renaissance music, the lengthening of a breve, semibreve or minim in particular rhythmic contexts
- Alteration (crime), in law, an offence of modifying an object with a view to deceiving another into believing that the true object is the same as that altered, for instance, money alteration is an offence of altering money "with the intent that it be brought into circulation as genuine or that such bringing into circulation be facilitated"
- In tailoring, changing an existing garment
- Mineral alteration, in geology, the changing of minerals and rock fabrics chemically by heat and fluid circulation
- Alteration, or root operation 0 according to the ICD-10-PCS, modifying the natural anatomic structure of a body part without affecting its function, e.g. to improve appearance
- The Alteration, 1976 alternate history novel by Kingsley Amis
- Alterations, a 1978 play by Michael Abbensetts
- Alteration (album), by Altera Enigma
- Alterations (film), a 1988 Australian film
- Alteratie, the change of power in Amsterdam on 26 May 1578
- Alterations (band), British four-piece musical group, active from 1977 to 1986

== See also ==
- Alter (disambiguation)
- Alternation (disambiguation)
- Change (disambiguation)
- Personalization
- Modification (disambiguation)
