= Altar (disambiguation) =

An altar is a religious structure for sacrifices or offerings.

Altar may also refer to:

== Arts and entertainment ==
=== Film ===
- Altar (2014 film), a film also released as The Haunting of Radcliffe House
- Altar (2016 film), an American found footage horror film

=== Music ===
- Altar (Brazilian duo), a dance music band
- Altar (Dutch band), a death metal band
- Altar (Romanian band), a metal band
- Altar (Sunn O))) and Boris album), 2006
- Altar (NewDad album), 2025
- The Altar, a 2016 album by Banks
- "The Altar", a 1989 Christian song by Ray Boltz
- "Altar", a song by Kehlani from Blue Water Road, 2022
- "Altar", a song by That Poppy from Bubblebath (EP), 2016

=== Literature ===
- "The Altar" (poem), a 17th-century poem by George Herbert

== Places ==
- Altar Municipality, a municipality in Sonora, Mexico
  - Altar, Sonora, a city in Altar Municipality
- El Altar, an extinct volcano in Ecuador
- The Altar (rock), rock summit in Queen Maud Land of Antarctica
- The Altar, or Ara, a constellation

== Religion ==
- Altar (Bible)
- Altar (Catholicism)
- Altar (Wicca)

== See also ==
- Alter (disambiguation)
- Altair (disambiguation)
