= SS West Mahomet =

Steel–hulled cargo ship

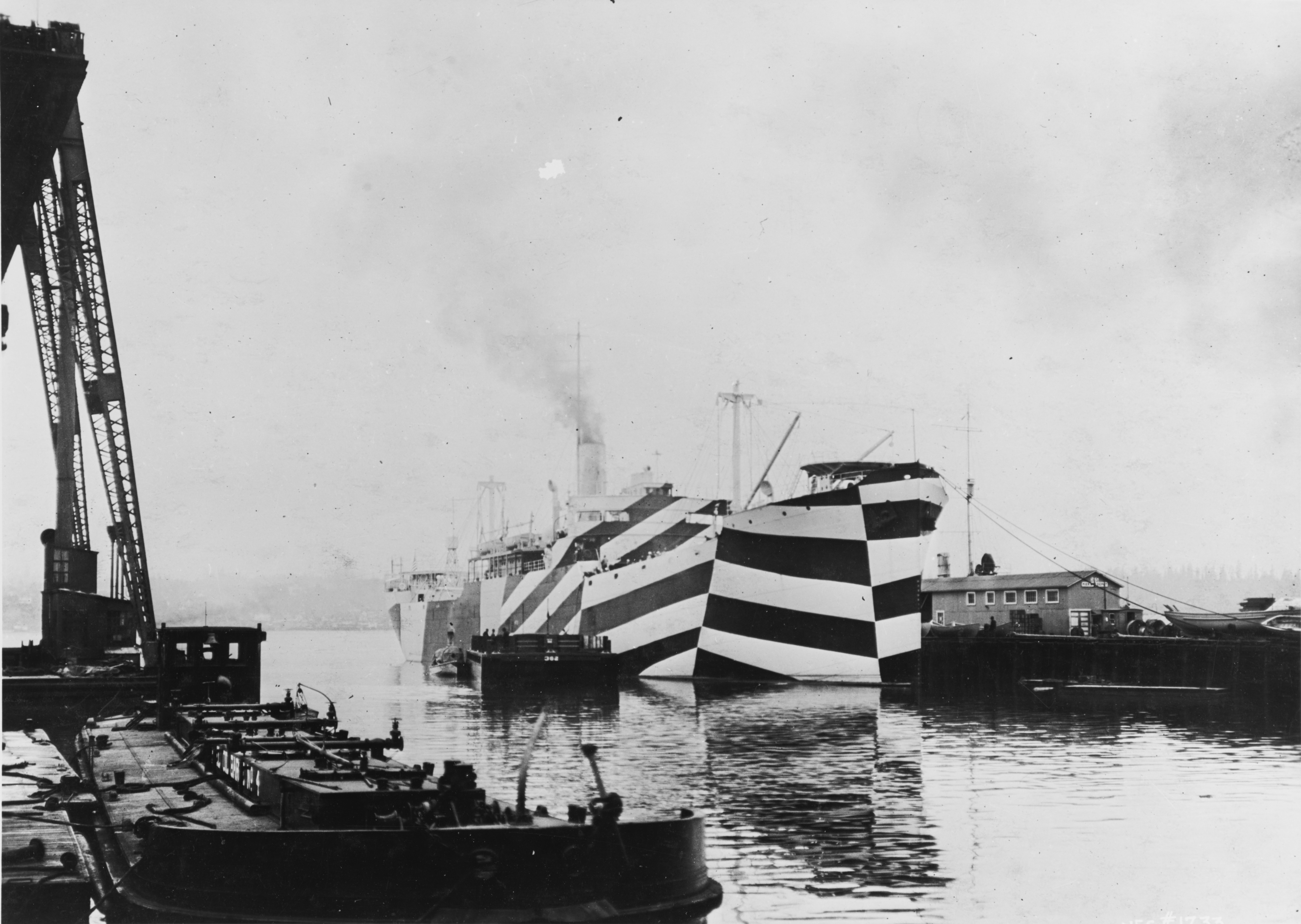
- USS West Mahomet (ID-3681) in port, c. November 1918. The ship has a dazzle camouflage scheme which distorts the appearance of her bow.

History
- Name: USS West Mahomet (ID-3681)
- Owner: U.S. Shipping Board
- Builder: Skinner & Eddy
- Yard number: 34 (USSB #1187)
- Laid down: 21 August 1918
- Launched: 19 October 1918
- Completed: 13 November 1918
- Commissioned: 13 November 1918–3 June 1919
- In service: 13 November 1918–about 1930
- Out of service: ~1930–1938
- Stricken: 3 June 1919
- Fate: Scrapped at Rosyth, Scotland, 1938

General characteristics
- Type: Design 1013 cargo ship
- Tonnage: 5,600 gross, 8,800 dwt
- Displacement: 12,225 tons
- Length: 423 ft 9 in (129.16 m); 410 ft 5 in (125.10 m) bp
- Beam: 54 ft (16 m)
- Draft: 24 ft 2 in (7.37 m)
- Depth of hold: 29 ft 9 in (9.07 m)
- Installed power: 1 × Curtis geared turbine
- Propulsion: Single propeller
- Speed: 11.5 kn (21.3 km/h)
- Complement: USN: 76; Merchant: about 30
- Armament: None

SS West Mahomet was a steel–hulled cargo ship which saw service as an auxiliary with the U.S. Navy in 1918–19.

West Mahomet was built as part of the United States Shipping Board's World War I emergency wartime shipbuilding program. Completed just too late to see service in the war, the ship was nevertheless commissioned into the Navy as USS West Mahomet (ID-3681), but saw only a handful of voyages on the Navy's behalf—including a postwar famine relief mission to Romania—before being decommissioned in June 1919.

The ship was subsequently placed into merchant service as SS West Mahomet, but with the onset of the Great Depression, she was laid up like many other ships of the period for lack of work. The vessel was scrapped at Rosyth, Scotland in 1938.

== Construction and design ==
West Mahomet was built in Seattle, Washington in 1918 at the No. 1 Plant of the Skinner & Eddy Corporation—the 19th in a series of 24 Design 1013 cargo ships built by Skinner & Eddy for the USSB's emergency wartime shipbuilding program. The ship was laid down on 21 August, launched 46½ working (58 calendar) days later on 19 October, and completed on 13 November—a total time under construction of 64 working (82 calendar) days, making West Mahomet one of the fastest-built ships of her time.

West Mahomet had a design deadweight tonnage of 8,800 tons and gross register tonnage of 5,600. She had an overall length of 423 feet 9 inches, a beam of 54 feet and a draft of 24 feet 2 inches. The ship was powered by a Curtis geared turbine, driving a single screw propeller and delivering a speed of 11.5 knots. Since the ship was completed too late to see wartime service—having been delivered just two days after Armistice Day—she was not provided with any armament.

== Service history ==
=== U.S. Navy service, 1918-1919 ===
Upon her delivery to the Navy on 13 November 1918, West Mahomet was commissioned the same day as USS West Mahomet (ID-3681) for operation with the Naval Overseas Transportation Service (NOTS).

On 29 November, West Mahomet departed Seattle with a cargo of 7,886 tons of flour on a postwar Eastern European famine relief mission. After proceeding via the Panama Canal, the ship reached New York on 28 December and sailed for the Near East on New Year's Day 1919. On 5 February, the freighter reached Constantinople where she discharged her cargo. She then loaded a return cargo of 970 bales of tobacco and 1,470 tons of water ballast and departed for New York on 5 March.

After unloading her cargo at New York, West Mahomet loaded 5,513 tons of general Army cargo and departed for Belgium on 26 April, arriving at Antwerp on 12 May. Having unloaded her cargo once again, the ship departed for the United States on 16 May, arriving at Newport News, Virginia on 2 June. The following day, she was simultaneously decommissioned, struck from the Navy List, and returned to control of the U.S. Shipping Board.

=== Merchant service ===
Following her decommission, the USSB placed West Mahomet into commercial service as SS West Mahomet. Subsequent records of the ship's movements are scarce, but it appears she remained active through the 1920s, operating from various ports in the United States to destinations as diverse as Brest, St. Nazaire and Le Havre, France; Liverpool, England; Kobe, Japan and Singapore. West Mahomet made headlines in January 1924 when an unidentified murder victim found in the Fourth Avenue subway station at Twenty-fifth Street, Brooklyn turned out to be a member of the ship's crew.

By 1930, the Great Depression was having an effect on international trade, and hundreds of ships, including West Mahomet, were laid up in ports around the United States with no work in this period. By 1933, the USSB had ceased to maintain the idle vessel, "due to age and deterioration". In 1937, West Mahomet was one of a group of 15 ships offered for sale to the highest bidder. Sold for scrap, she was transferred from her berth in Mobile, Alabama to Rosyth, Scotland where in 1938 she was broken up.

== Bibliography ==
- Bane, Suda Lorena (1943): Organization of American relief in Europe, 1918-1919, pp. 343–344, Stanford University Press.
- Hurley, Edward N. (1920): The New Merchant Marine, p. 93, The Century Co., New York.
- Pacific Ports Inc. (1919): Pacific Ports Annual, Fifth Edition, 1919, pp. 64–65, Pacific Ports Inc.
- Silverstone, Paul H. (2006): The New Navy, 1883-1922, pp. 169–170, Routledge, ISBN 978-0-415-97871-2.
