= Altered =

Altered may refer to:

- Altered (2006 film), an American science fiction horror film by one of directors of The Blair Witch Project
- Altered (2024 film), an American science fiction action film starring Tom Felton
- Altered (drag racing), a former drag racing class
- Altered scale
- Altered state of consciousness

== See also ==
- Alter (disambiguation)
