= USS West Hobomac =

Cargo ship

Coordinates: 4°4′N 8°4′W

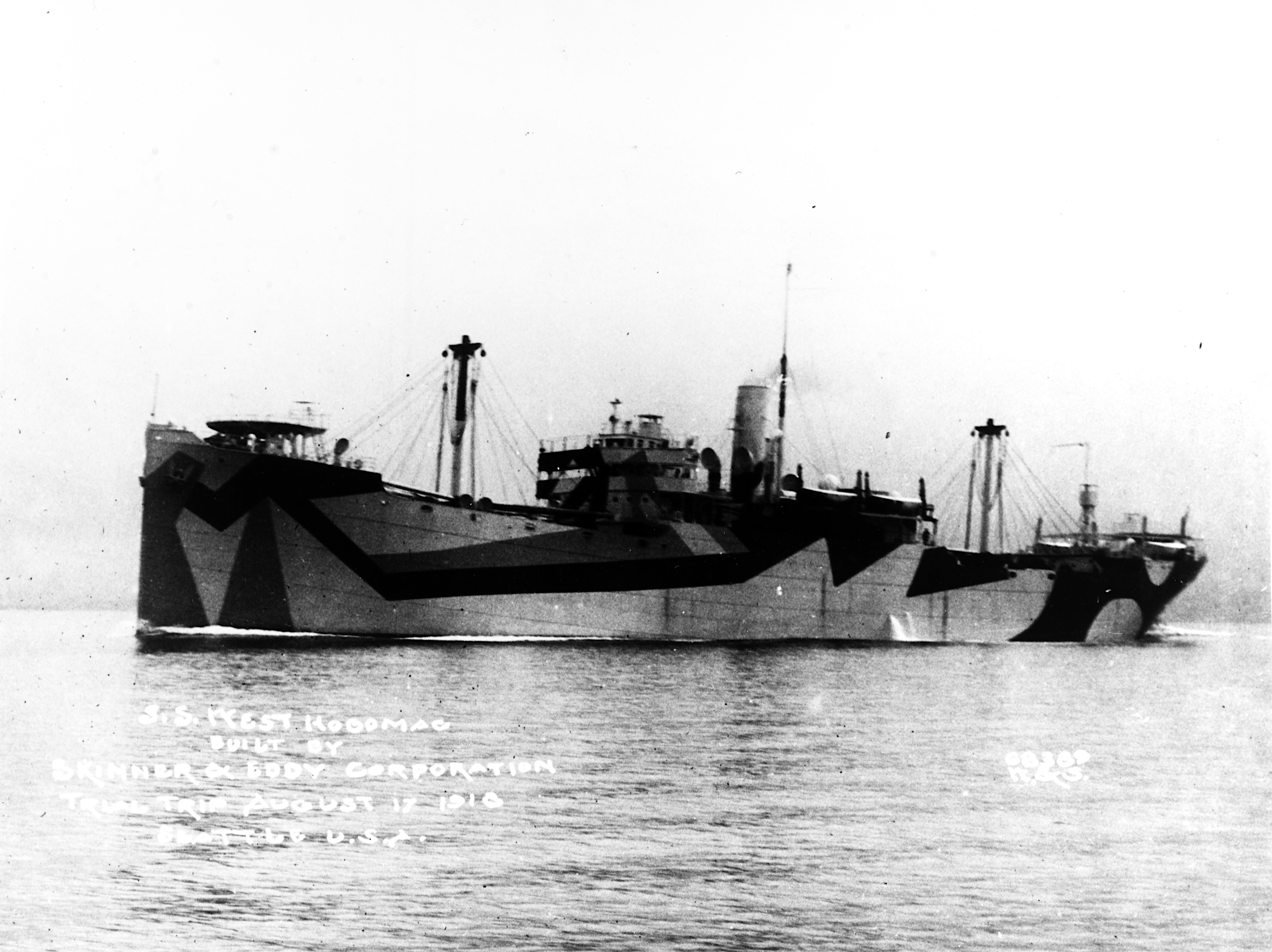
- SS West Hobomac in dazzle camouflage paint, on trials 17 August 1918

History

United States
- Name: West Hobomac
- Operator: U.S. Shipping Board 19; Lykes Lines 33; Companie Generale Transatlantique 40; MoWT 40
- Builder: Skinner & Eddy
- Laid down: 29 May 1918
- Launched: 27 July 1918
- Completed: 17 August 1918
- Commissioned: 17 August 1918
- Decommissioned: 10 June 1919
- Renamed: Ile de Batz
- Stricken: 10 June 1918
- Fate: Sunk on 17 March 1942

General characteristics
- Type: Design 1013 cargo ship
- Tonnage: 5,600 GRT; 8,800 DWT
- Displacement: 12,225 tons
- Length: 423 ft 9 in (129.16 m); 410 ft 5 in (125.10 m) lbp
- Beam: 54 ft (16 m)
- Draft: 24 ft 2 in (7.37 m)
- Depth of hold: 29 ft 9 in (9.07 m)
- Installed power: 1 × Curtis geared turbine
- Propulsion: Single screw
- Speed: 11 kn (20 km/h)
- Complement: World War I (USN): 29; World War II: 43 (39 crew, 4 gunners)

USS West Hobomac was a steel–hulled cargo ship which saw service with the U.S. Navy as an auxiliary during World War I, and which later operated under the British flag during World War II before being lost to enemy action.

Commissioned into the Navy just three months before the end of World War I, West Hobomac completed three voyages during the war, and made several more on the Navy's behalf in the immediate postwar period prior to decommission in 1919. Between the wars, the ship operated as the merchant vessel SS West Hobomac.

With the outbreak of World War II, West Hobomac was acquired by French interests and renamed SS Ile de Batz. After the Fall of France in June 1940, Ile de Batz was seized by the British and placed into service under the British flag. Ile de Batz was torpedoed and sunk by the German submarine U-68 off the West African coast on 17 March 1942.

== Construction and design ==
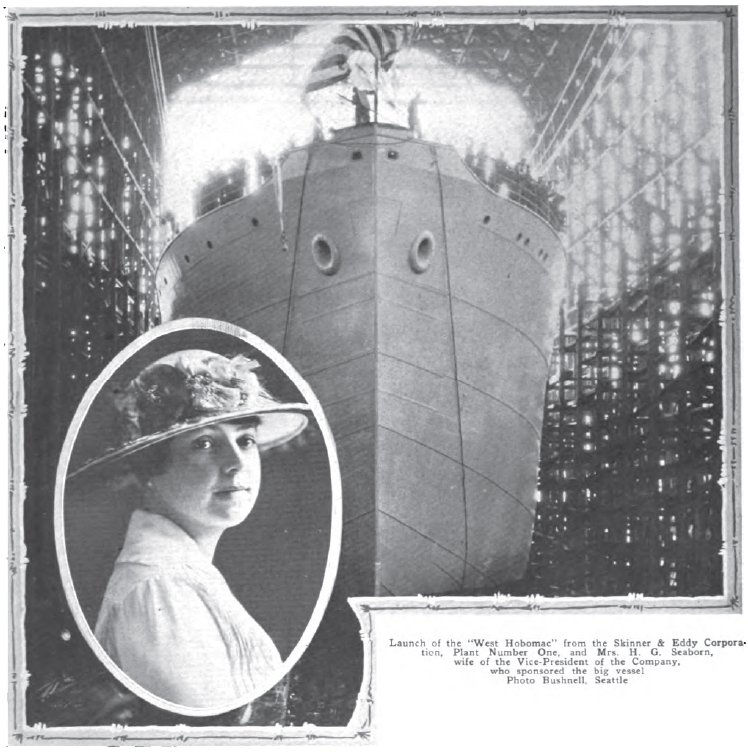
Launch of West Hobomac with ship sponsor (inset)

West Hobomac was built in Seattle, Washington in 1918 at the No. 1 Plant of the Skinner & Eddy Corporation—the 13th in a series of 24 steel–hulled Design 1013 cargo ships built by Skinner & Eddy for the United States Shipping Board's emergency wartime shipbuilding program. The ship was laid down on 29 May 1918 and launched just 49 working days (59 calendar days) later on 27 July—a new record for the company, eclipsing its previous best of 51 working days. Completed on 17 August after only 66 working (80 calendar) days under construction, West Hobomac would end the war as the fifth fastest-built ship in the world.

West Hobomac had a designed deadweight tonnage of 8,800 and gross register tonnage of 5,600. The ship had an overall length of 423 feet 9 inches, a beam of 54 feet and a draft of about 24 feet. The vessel was powered by a Curtis geared turbine driving a single screw propeller, delivering a service speed of 11 knots.

== Service history ==
=== U.S. Navy service, 1918–1919 ===
West Hobomac was delivered to the U.S. Navy on 17 August 1918 and commissioned the same day for operation with the Naval Overseas Transportation Service (NOTS) as USS West Hobomac.

After taking on a cargo of 7,928 tons of coal, West Hobomac departed Portland, Oregon on 26 August 1918, bound for Iquique, Chile. Arriving at her destination on 23 September, West Hobomac discharged her cargo and loaded 824 tons of nitrates bound for the United States. Returning north along the Pacific coast of South America, West Hobomac transited the Panama Canal and arrived at New York on 8 November, three days before the end of World War I, where she unloaded her cargo. While still berthed at New York, West Hobomac received repairs to her engine and steering gear, underwent alterations to her crew's quarters, and refueled.

West Hobomac departed New York on 30 November, bound for France with a cargo of Army supplies, and arrived at Brest nine days before Christmas. Discharging her cargo, the vessel loaded 226 tons of Army return cargo and additional ballast, and on 18 January departed once more for New York. Arriving at her destination 6 February, the ship remained there for nearly two weeks, unloading and taking on board 6,392 tons of cargo for transport to the Netherlands.

Reaching Rotterdam on 11 March, West Hobomac unloaded and departed that port, in ballast, on the 23rd, bound for the United States. At New York, she loaded 5,252 tons of foodstuffs and relief supplies and sailed on 23 April for Belgium, arriving at Antwerp on 12 May where she discharged her cargo.

Departing for the United States on 16 May, West Hobomac arrived at Newport News, Virginia on 5 June. On 10 June, the ship was decommissioned, struck from the Navy List, and returned to control of the United States Shipping Board.

=== Interwar years ===
In the interwar period, the USSB placed West Hobomac into commercial service. Little information is available concerning the ship's movements in this period, but it is known that the vessel was active in trade between the United States and Europe as well as ports in the Mediterranean. In 1933, the ship was acquired by the Lykes Brothers-Ripley Steamship Company consortium (later known as the Lykes Brothers Steamship Company.

=== World War II ===
On 28 March 1940, West Hobomac was acquired at Newport News, Virginia by a French firm, Companie Generale Transatlantique, which renamed the ship Ile de Batz. Following the Fall of France in June 1940, Ile de Batz was seized by the British at Falmouth and transferred by the Minister of War Transport to the Bank Line for operation under the British flag.

By early 1942 Ile de Batz—now mostly manned by a Free French crew—was in operation between the United Kingdom and various ports in Africa and the Far East. Leaving Cape Town, South Africa with a 6,605-ton cargo of general goods and rice, Ile de Batz was intercepted 28 miles southwest of Cape Palmas on 17 March by U-68. After disabling the vessel with a torpedo fired at 6:35 am, U-68 surfaced and sank the stricken vessel at around 7:51 with 33 explosive rounds from her 10.5 cm gun. Four crew members of Ile de Batz were killed in the attack but the rest, including the ship's captain, 34 crew and 4 gunners made their way back to Cape Palmas, from whence they were taken to Freetown by the Canadian corvette HMCS Weyburn.

== Bibliography ==
- Hurley, Edward N. (1920): The New Merchant Marine, p. 93, The Century Co., New York.
- Pacific Ports Inc. (1919): Pacific Ports Annual, Fifth Edition, 1919, pp. 64–65, Pacific Ports Inc.
- Silverstone, Paul H. (2006): The New Navy, 1883–1922, Routledge, ISBN 978-0-415-97871-2.
