= SS West Loquassuck =

American navy steel-hulled cargo ship

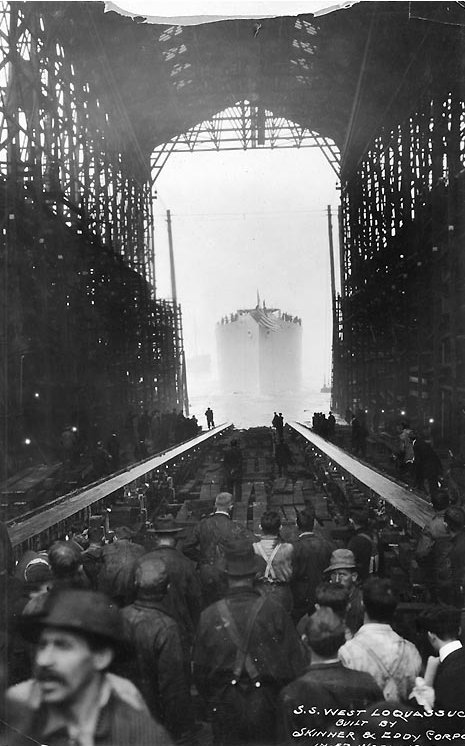
- Launch of SS West Loquassuck, 21 September 1918

History
- Name: SS West Loquassuck
- Owner: U.S. Shipping Board
- Builder: Skinner & Eddy
- Yard number: 32 (USSB #1185)
- Laid down: 20 July 1918
- Launched: 21 September 1918
- Acquired: 15 October 1918
- Commissioned: 15 October 1918 – 17 April 1919
- In service: 15 October 1918–1930s
- Renamed: SS West Loquasuck (1919)
- Stricken: 17 April 1919
- Fate: Scrapped at Baltimore, 1936

General characteristics
- Type: Design #1013 cargo ship
- Tonnage: 5,600 gross, 8,800 dwt
- Displacement: 12,225 tons
- Length: 423 ft 9 in (129.16 m); 410 ft 5 in (125.10 m) bp
- Beam: 54 ft (16 m)
- Draft: 24 ft 2 in (7.37 m)
- Depth of hold: 29 ft 9 in (9.07 m)
- Installed power: 1 × Curtis geared turbine
- Propulsion: Single propeller
- Speed: 11.5 kn (21.3 km/h)
- Complement: World War I (USN): 70; Peacetime: about 30
- Armament: none

SS West Loquassuck was a steel–hulled cargo ship built for the United States Shipping Board's Emergency Fleet Corporation in World War I. After completion on 15 October 1918, the ship was immediately commissioned into the U.S. Navy as USS West Loquassuck (ID-3638), just weeks before the end of the war.

USS West Loquassuck undertook several transport missions for the Navy in the immediate postwar period prior to decommission, and subsequently operated as the merchant ship SS West Loquassuck into the 1930s. She was scrapped in Baltimore in 1936.

== Design and construction ==
West Loquassuck was built in Seattle, Washington at the No. 1 Plant of the Skinner & Eddy Corporation as a Design 1013 ship—a steel–hulled Skinner & Eddy cargo ship design approved for wartime service by the USSB. A product of America's emergency World War I shipbuilding program, West Loquassuck was constructed at close to world record pace in just 84 calendar (70 working) days. Her keel was laid on 20 July 1918 and she was launched 63 days (53 working days) later on 21 September, prior to completion on 15 October.

Nominally a vessel of 8,800 deadweight tons, West Loquassuck is listed in mercantile records as having a deadweight tonnage of 8,578 and a gross register tonnage of 5,644. The ship had an overall length of 423 feet 9 inches, a beam of 54 feet and a draft of 24 feet 2 inches. West Loquassuck was powered by a Curtis geared steam turbine driving a single screw propeller, delivering a service speed of 11.5 knots.

== Service history ==
=== Naval service ===
West Loquassuck was delivered to the U.S. Navy on 15 October 1918 at the Puget Sound Navy Yard, Bremerton, Washington, and commissioned the same day into the Naval Overseas Transportation Service (NOTS) as USS West Loquassuck (ID-3638).

After completing her sea trials, West Loquassuck set sail for Chile to load a cargo of guano for delivery to Charleston, South Carolina. Departing Iquique, Chile on 4 December, West Loquassuck transited the Panama Canal on her return journey, arriving at Charleston 23 December where her cargo was discharged.

From Charleston, West Loquassuck next departed for Galveston, Texas to load a shipment of cotton bound for the United Kingdom, which was duly delivered to Falmouth, England on 17 February 1919. On 25 March, the ship commenced her return journey in ballast to the United States where, upon her arrival at Boston, Massachusetts, she was decommissioned, struck from the Navy List and returned to the Shipping Board on 17 April 1919.

=== Mercantile service ===
Following her decommission, West Loquassuck was placed into merchant service by the USSB as SS West Loquassuck. In the early 1920s she is known to have been active in transatlantic service. The Ellis Island database records that West Loquasuck made a voyage from Bordeaux, France to New York in 1920, arriving 21 December. Another voyage to New York was completed on 9 April 1923 from Hangö, Finland and a third arrived from Burutu and the Canary Islands on 2 February 1924.

By the late 1920s, West Loquassuck had been placed into Pacific service with the Roosevelt Line. The ship made several voyages between New York and Sydney, Australia in 1929–1930, including one where she was diverted to New Zealand for a medical emergency.

In the latter half of 1933, West Loquassuck was abandoned by the USSB "due to age and deterioration". She was scrapped in Baltimore in 1936.

== Bibliography ==
- Hurley, Edward N. (1920): The New Merchant Marine, pp. 92–93, The Century Co., New York.
- Jordan, Roger H. (2006): The World's Merchant Fleets, 1939: The Particulars And Wartime Fates of 6,000 Ships, p. 433, Naval Institute Press, ISBN 978-1-59114-959-0.
- Pacific Ports Inc. (1919): Pacific Ports Annual, Fifth Edition, 1919, pp. 64–65, 402–405, Pacific Ports Inc.
- Silverstone, Paul H. (2006): The New Navy, 1883–1922, p. 169, Routledge, ISBN 978-0-415-97871-2.
