= SS Western Front =

Auxiliary Ship of the US Navy in World War I

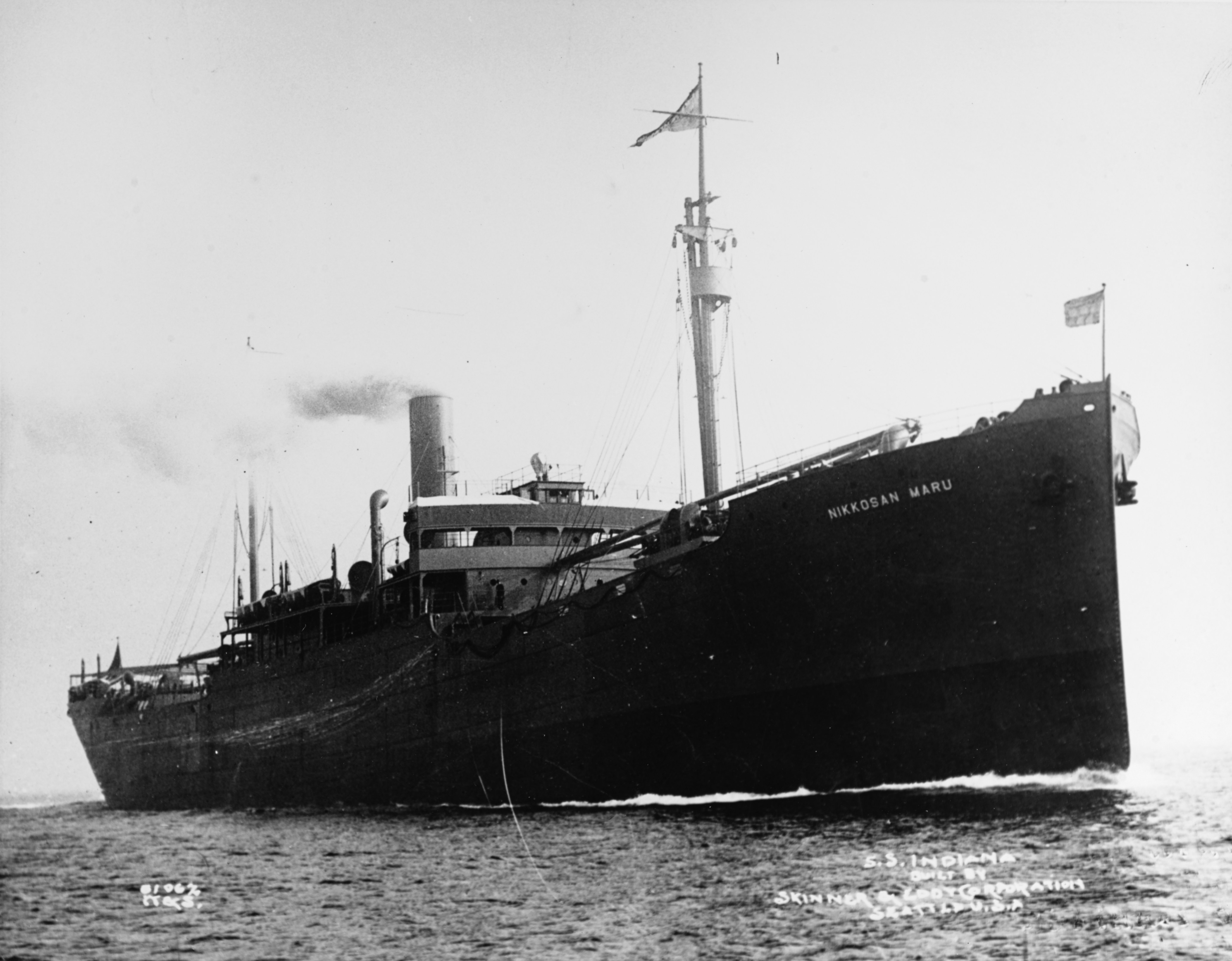
- SS Nikkosan Maru (later USS Western Front) underway in 1917, probably during trials

History

United States
- Name: USS Western Front (ID-1787)
- Owner: U.S. Shipping Board
- Builder: Skinner & Eddy
- Yard number: 9
- Laid down: 25 May 1917
- Launched: 15 September 1917
- Completed: 20 October 1917
- Commissioned: 11 May 1918 – 15 August 1919
- In service: 11 May 1918 – 11 July 1921
- Renamed: Martha Washington; Nikkosan Maru; USS Indiana (ID-1787); USS Western Front (ID-1787)
- Fate: Onboard explosion resulting in vessel destroyed off Bishop Rock, 11 July 1921

General characteristics
- Type: Cargo ship
- Tonnage: 5,742 gross, 8,800 dwt
- Displacement: 12,225 tons
- Length: 423 ft 9 in (129.16 m); 410 ft 5 in (125.10 m) bp
- Beam: 54 ft (16 m)
- Draft: 24 ft 2 in (7.37 m)
- Depth of hold: 29 ft 9 in (9.07 m)
- Installed power: 1 × Curtis geared turbine
- Propulsion: Single propeller
- Speed: 11.5 kn (21.3 km/h)
- Complement: World War I (USN): 98; Peacetime: 32
- Armament: WWI: 1 × 4"/50 cal, 1 × 6-pdr

USS Western Front (ID-1787) was a steel-hulled cargo ship which saw service as an auxiliary with the United States Navy in World War I. Initially named Martha Washington, she was laid down for mercantile service as Nikkosan Maru, but following America's entry into the war, was requisitioned by the United States Shipping Board and commissioned into the U.S. Navy as the supply ship USS Indiana. This name was also quickly dropped however, in favour of USS Western Front.

Western Front completed several supply missions to France during the war. After decommissioning, she was placed into merchant service as SS Western Front. Less than two years later, the ship was lost in a maritime accident off Bishop Rock, United Kingdom.

== Construction and design ==
Western Front was initially given the name Martha Washington by the builder, the Skinner & Eddy Corporation of Seattle, Washington, but was eventually laid down, on 25 May 1917 at the company's Plant No. 1, as Nikkosan Maru for the Japanese company Mitsui.

On 3 August 1917, in an emergency wartime measure, the United States Shipping Board requisitioned all vessels of over 2,500 deadweight tons currently under construction in the United States, and Nikkosan Maru thus passed into the ownership of the U.S. government. The ship was launched on 15 September and completed 20 October, having spent a total of 150 days (122 working days) under construction. After completion, the vessel was renamed Indiana.

Indiana had a design deadweight tonnage of 8,800, and a gross register tonnage of 5,742 tons. The ship had an overall length of 423 feet 9 inches, a beam of 54 feet and a draft of 24 feet 2 inches. She was powered by a Curtis geared turbine driving a single screw propeller, delivering a service speed of about 11.5 knots.

These specifications are identical to those of the later USSB Design 1013 standard, a design originating from the Skinner & Eddy Corporation itself, and it is likely that Indiana was similar if not identical to the 1013s later produced by the company. However, Indiana was never formally designated a Design 1013. For wartime service, the ship was fitted with one 4"/50 caliber and one 6-pounder gun.

== Service history ==
=== U.S. Navy service, 1918-1919 ===
Following her completion, Indiana steamed to the East Coast where she was inspected by the Navy on 16 September and acquired shortly thereafter. On 11 May 1918, the vessel was placed into commission for operation with the Naval Overseas Transportation Service (NOTS) as USS Indiana (ID 1787), but within a few days, her name was changed again, to USS Western Front. The ship would retain the name Western Front for the remainder of her brief career. Her first commander was Lt. Comdr. John Burns, USNRF.

Taking on board a cargo of steel rails, ordnance equipment, and ten locomotives, Western Front began her first passage to France on 17 May, but on the 23rd suffered a collision in convoy which sank the British cargo ship Clan Matheson. Western Front survived the collision, but was too badly damaged to continue the voyage and was forced to return to New York for temporary repairs. On 6 June she resumed the passage to France, arriving at St. Nazaire on the 22nd and discharging her cargo there. She then returned to New York, where she was drydocked at Robbins Drydock, Brooklyn, for more permanent repairs.

Western Front subsequently made four more voyages carrying cargoes for NOTS to the French ports of Bordeaux, La Pallice, Quiberon, and Brest. On one run in the spring of 1919, she delivered 26 Army tanks to New York. Returning from the last of these voyages on 2 August 1919, Western Front was decommissioned on 15 August at Newport News, Virginia and returned to the Shipping Board on the same day.

=== Loss in merchant service ===
Western Front was subsequently placed into mercantile service as SS Western Front. Her career was not to last much longer however. On 23 June 1921, Western Front departed Jacksonville, Florida bound for London and Hamburg with a cargo of naval stores, rosin and turpentine. On 11 July, about 10 miles south of Bishop Rock, Isles of Scilly, a fire broke out which could not be contained and an explosion occurred. Most of the crew were rescued by the steamer British Earl.

== Bibliography ==
Books

- Hurley, Edward N. (1920): The New Merchant Marine, p. 39, The Century Co., New York.
- Pacific Ports Inc. (1919): Pacific Ports Annual, Fifth Edition, 1919, pp. 64-65, 402-405, Pacific Ports Inc.
- Silverstone, Paul H. (2006): The New Navy, 1883-1922, Routledge, ISBN 978-0-415-97871-2.

Journals

- McKellar, Norman L. (1962): "Steel Shipbuilding under the U.S. Shipping Board, 1917-1921 - The Requisitioned Ships", The Belgian Shiplover, No. 88, July–August 1962, pp. 389-390. Reproduced at shipscribe.com, here.
