= SS West Lashaway =

Coordinates: 10°30′N 55°10′W

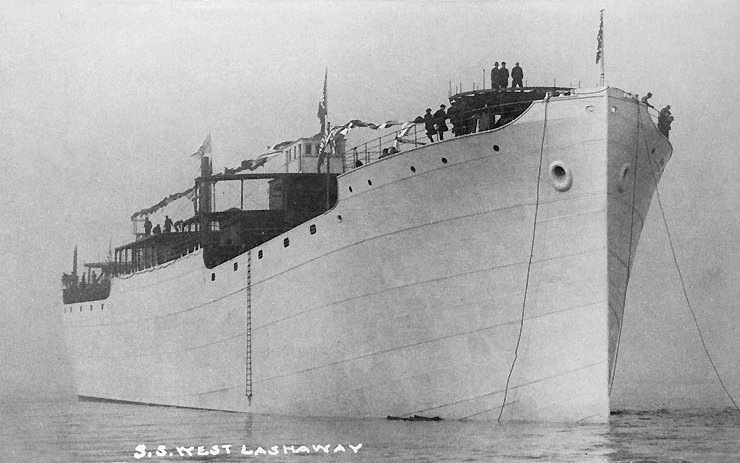
- SS West Lashaway shortly after launch and before the completion of her superstructure, 12 September 1918

History
- Name: SS West Lashaway
- Operator: U.S. Navy 1918; U.S. Shipping Board 1919; American-West African Line ~1930
- Builder: Skinner & Eddy
- Laid down: 8 July 1918
- Launched: 12 September 1918
- Completed: 30 September 1918
- Commissioned: 30 September 1918–12 April 1919
- In service: 30 September 1918–30 August 1942
- Stricken: 12 April 1919
- Fate: Torpedoed and sunk, 30 August 1942

General characteristics
- Type: Design 1013 cargo ship
- Tonnage: 5,600 GRT; 8,800 DWT
- Displacement: 11,390 tons
- Length: 423 ft 9 in (129.16 m); 410 ft 5 in (125.10 m) bp
- Beam: 54 ft (16 m)
- Draft: 24 ft 2 in (7.37 m)
- Depth of hold: 29 ft 9 in (9.07 m)
- Installed power: 1 × steam turbine
- Propulsion: Single screw
- Speed: 11.5 kn (21.3 km/h)
- Complement: World War I (USN): 70; Peacetime: about 40; World War II: 47 (38 crew, 9 gunners)

SS West Lashaway was a steel–hulled cargo ship that saw service with the U.S. Navy during World War I as the auxiliary ship USS West Lashaway (ID-3700). She was later engaged in mercantile service, until being sunk by a U-boat in 1942.

West Lashaway was commissioned into the Navy immediately upon completion in September 1918, but only had time to complete one voyage before the end of the war. In the months that followed, the ship made several more voyages with the Navy, including a children's relief mission to Eastern Europe, before decommissioning in 1919. West Lashaway was subsequently placed in commercial service, operating between the United States and various ports in Europe. Later, the ship was employed in trade between the U.S. and Africa.

In August 1942, West Lashaway was torpedoed and sunk by U-66 in the Caribbean. The handful of survivors, including four children, endured a three-week ordeal in an open boat with minimal supplies before being rescued. One of them would later write a book about the experience.

== Construction and design ==
West Lashaway was built in Seattle, Washington in 1918 at the No. 1 Plant of the Skinner & Eddy Corporation—the 16th in a series of 24 steel-hulled Design 1013 cargo ships built by Skinner & Eddy for the United States Shipping Board's emergency wartime shipbuilding program. The ship was laid down on 8 July, launched just 55 working (65 calendar) days later on 12 September, and completed on 30 September—a total time under construction of 69 working (84 calendar) days, making West Lashaway one of the fastest-built ships of the war.

West Lashaway had a design deadweight tonnage of 8,800 tons and gross register tonnage of 5,600. The ship had an overall length of 423 feet 9 inches, a beam of 54 feet and a draft of about 24 feet. She was powered by a Curtis geared turbine driving a single screw propeller, delivering a service speed of 11 to 11.5 knots.

== Service history ==
=== U.S. Navy service, 1918-1919 ===
West Lashaway was delivered to the Navy on 30 September 1918 and commissioned the same day at the Puget Sound Navy Yard, Bremerton, Washington as USS West Lashaway (ID-3700).

Assigned to the Naval Overseas Transportation Service (NOTS), West Lashaway conducted sea trials off the northwest Pacific coast before loading 7,790 tons of flour and sailing for the east coast on 17 October. Arriving at New York via the Panama Canal on 11 November—the day upon which the armistice ending World War I was signed—the freighter then underwent a few minor repairs. On 28 November, West Lashaway departed New York for Trieste, Italy on a relief mission for children in Austria and Yugoslavia. Arriving at Trieste three days before Christmas, West Lashaway discharged her cargo of flour and cocoa and subsequently departed for New York City, arriving there on 30 January 1919 where she again underwent general repairs.

After simultaneously bunkering and loading 5,144 tons of Quartermaster's and YMCA supplies, the freighter departed for France, arriving at Nantes on 19 February. Having discharged her cargo, West Lashaway loaded a return cargo—which included 300 tons of Army ordnance materials—and sailed for New York City on 20 March. After unloading and undergoing general repairs at New York following her arrival on 4 April, West Lashaway was simultaneously decommissioned, struck from the Navy List and returned to control of the USSB on 12 April 1919.

=== Merchant service ===
Following her decommission, West Lashaway was placed in mercantile service by the USSB as SS West Lashaway. From 1919 through the mid-1920s West Lashaway was active in transatlantic service, carrying cargo between New York and various European ports such as Lisbon, Portugal; La Pallice, France; Valencia, Spain and Genoa, Naples, Palermo, Trieste and Fiume, Italy.

By the early 1930s, West Lashaway had been chartered to the American-West African Line (Barber Steamship Lines), and would spend much of the decade plying the trade routes between U.S. ports such as Boston and New York and various African destinations such as Lagos, Nigeria; Accra, Ghana and the Belgian Congo.

West Lashaway appears to have had quite an eventful history through this part of her career. In 1931, the freighter was used to bring five gorillas from French Cameroon to the U.S. for study. In 1935, U.S. customs agents uncovered and seized a stash of 1,000 bottles of contraband Scotch whisky on board the ship upon her return from the Cape Verde Islands. West Lashaway again made headlines in July 1937 when a crew member was handed to port authorities in chains after allegedly attempting to set fire to the vessel on the open sea and murder the captain. In 1938, the vessel played host to a wealthy big game hunter, his wife, their entourage and two "jungle yachts"—luxurious, air-conditioned trailers, which the hunter proposed to use as a base while tracking a mysterious 8-foot-tall (2.4 m) ape he professed to have sighted on a previous expedition to the Congo. In 1939, the ship's crew was involved in a strike that won American merchant mariners a 25% wartime wage increase for "sailing in dangerous waters". On April 5, 1941 the West Lashaway docked in Boston and a stowaway female Basenji dog was found half-starved in the cargo hold. She had survived a 21 day journey from Monrovia, Liberia with a stop at Freetown before docking in Boston. She was adopted by a local breeder and became one of the earliest founders of the Basenji breed in the United States.

==== Sinking ====
After the United States entered World War II in December 1941, West Lashaway continued to operate in the Africa trade. On the night of 30 August 1942, while returning to the United States from Matadi, Congo with nine civilian passengers and a cargo of 7,670 tons of tin, copper, cocoa beans and palm oil, West Lashaway was struck on the starboard side at around 2:30 pm by two torpedoes fired from U-66. The ship sank very quickly—in two minutes or less—and consequently there was no time to launch any lifeboats. Fortunately, the vessel was also equipped with a number of prepared wooden rafts which floated free when the ship went down, allowing the survivors to board them.

==== Survivors' ordeal ====
Shortly after the sinking, U-66 surfaced and briefly opened fire with small arms, but soon departed, leaving a total of 42 survivors on four rafts from the ship's original complement of 56. The rafts stayed together for the first few days, but then two became separated and were never seen again. The remaining two, which had been lashed together, later decided to separate in hopes of increasing their chances of being found. One of these rafts contained 19 people, including the ship's captain, 11 crew, two armed guards, and five of the ship's original nine passengers including a missionary's wife, Mrs Bell, and her two children aged 13 and 11, and two children from another family. The captain and one of the armed guards died within the first few days, leaving a total of seventeen.

The occupants of this raft initially assumed they would be rescued quickly, but two weeks went by until even with strict rationing they were running low on food and water. They were eventually sighted by aircraft and some supplies dropped. After nineteen days on the open sea, they were rescued by the destroyer HMS Vimy (D33), but not before the rescuers had fired 16 rounds at the raft in the mistaken impression it was a German submarine. After transfer to the Dutch merchant steamship Prins William Van Oranje, the survivors were landed at Barbados. One of the children, Robert Bell, would later write a book, In Peril on the Sea: A Personal Remembrance, about the ordeal.

25 days after the sinking of West Lashaway, the raft which had been cut loose washed up on the island of St. Vincent, with the body of Gunner's Mate 3/C Dalton Munn, and the sole survivor of this group, boatswain Elliott Gurnee.

== Bibliography ==
Books

- Hurley, Edward N. (1920): The New Merchant Marine, p. 39, The Century Co., New York.
- Jordan, Roger H. (2006): The World's Merchant Fleets, 1939: The Particulars And Wartime Fates of 6,000 Ships, Naval Institute Press, ISBN 978-1-59114-959-0.
- Pacific Ports Inc. (1919): Pacific Ports Annual, Fifth Edition, 1919, pp. 64–65, 402–405, Pacific Ports Inc.
- Silverstone, Paul H. (2006): The New Navy, 1883-1922, Routledge, ISBN 978-0-415-97871-2.

Websites

- Whitbeck, Mary (2006): "A Rainbow Every Day: A woman, four kids and 12 sailors adrift in the Atlantic", alliancelife.org, Part 1, Part 2.
