= Skinner & Eddy =

American 20th century shipbuilder in Seattle, Washington

Coordinates: 47.5902°N 122.33941°W

Skinner & Eddy Corporation
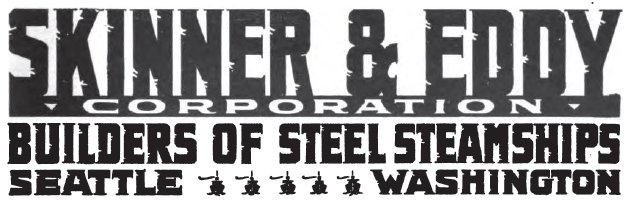
- Company type: Private
- Industry: Shipbuilding
- Predecessor: Seattle Construction and Drydock Co.
- Founded: 1916
- Founder: Ned Skinner, John W. Eddy
- Defunct: (As a shipyard) 1923
- Successor: Skinner Corporation
- Headquarters: Seattle, Washington, United States
- Products: Steel merchant ships
- Services: Ship repairs

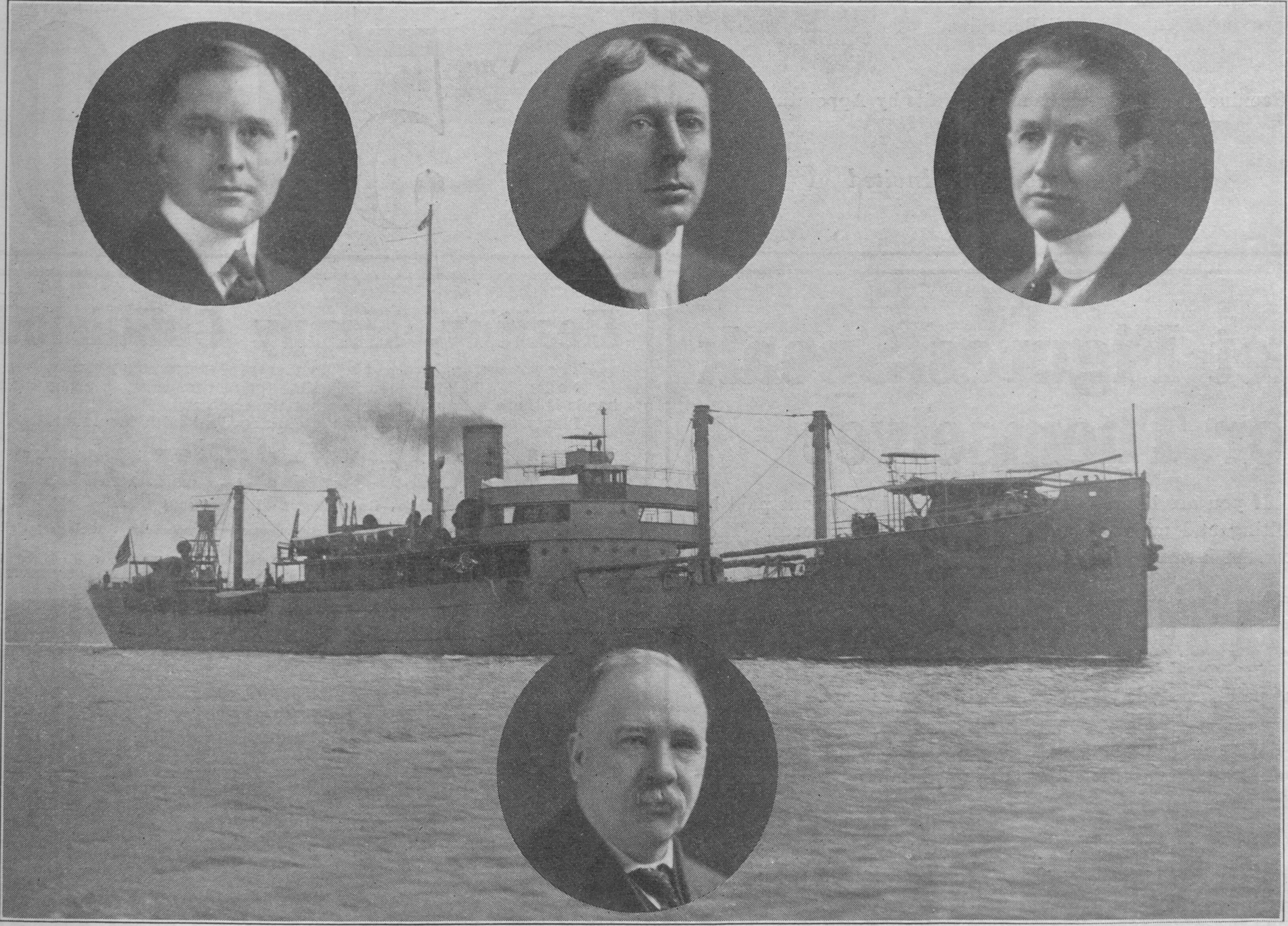
This 1918 montage from Seattle magazine The Town Crier shows the SS West Mahomet, with inset portraits of company vice president Henry G. Seaborn and founders D.E. Skinner and John W. Eddy (left to right at top) and general manager David Rodgers (below).

The Skinner & Eddy Corporation, commonly known as Skinner & Eddy, was a Seattle, Washington-based shipbuilding corporation that existed from 1916 to 1923. The yard is notable for completing more ships for the United States war effort during World War I than any other American shipyard, and also for breaking world production speed records for individual ship construction.

In total, the company built 75 ships—72 cargo ships and three oil tankers—from 1916 to 1920, including 32 completed for the Emergency Fleet Corporation during the war. The yard was closed in 1921 as a result of the severe postwar shipbuilding slump. Skinner & Eddy later became a shipping line operator, and appears to have been wound up in the early 1970s.

== Background ==
The Skinner & Eddy Corporation was founded in January 1916 by two entrepreneurs, David E. "D.E." Skinner and John W. Eddy, owners of the Port Blakely Mill Company since 1903. Shortly after its establishment on the downtown Seattle waterfront, Skinner & Eddy Corp. began leasing the shipyard of the Seattle Construction and Drydock Company (at the time a subsidiary of Todd Shipbuilding), located a few steps north between Connecticut and Dearborn Street. Seattle Construction & Dry Dock was itself a successor to the Moran Brothers shipyard, which around the start of the 20th century had been one of America's largest shipyards, responsible for building Seattle's first battleship, USS Nebraska, in 1906.

On April 6, 1917, 15 months after Skinner and Eddy Corp. began leasing the yard, the United States entered World War I. Skinner & Eddy responded to the news by purchasing an additional 15 acres (61,000 m^{2}) of Seattle waterfront property from the Seattle Dock Company and the Centennial Flouring Mill for $1,500,000 and $600,000 respectively, which they used to begin building a second shipyard, which became known as Plant No. 2 and lay just south of plant No. 1. After securing lucrative contracts from the Emergency Fleet Corporation for the construction of merchant ships for the war effort, Skinner & Eddy was also able in June 1918 to make an outright purchase of the yard of Seattle Construction and Dry Dock, which was named Plant No. 1.

== Facilities ==
When completed, Skinner & Eddy's facilities included ten building slipways—five at each Plant—and four outfitting docks. A five-section, 459-foot (140 m) drydock capable of servicing vessels of up to 15,000 tons was also acquired, along with a 50-ton floating crane.

Most of the ships built by the company during the war were constructed at Plant No. 1, as Plant No. 2 was still under construction for much of this period. With its two plants, which together covered about 57 acres (230,000 m^{2}) of waterfront property, Skinner & Eddy was Seattle's largest shipbuilding company, at its wartime peak employing about 13,500 people.

== World War I ==
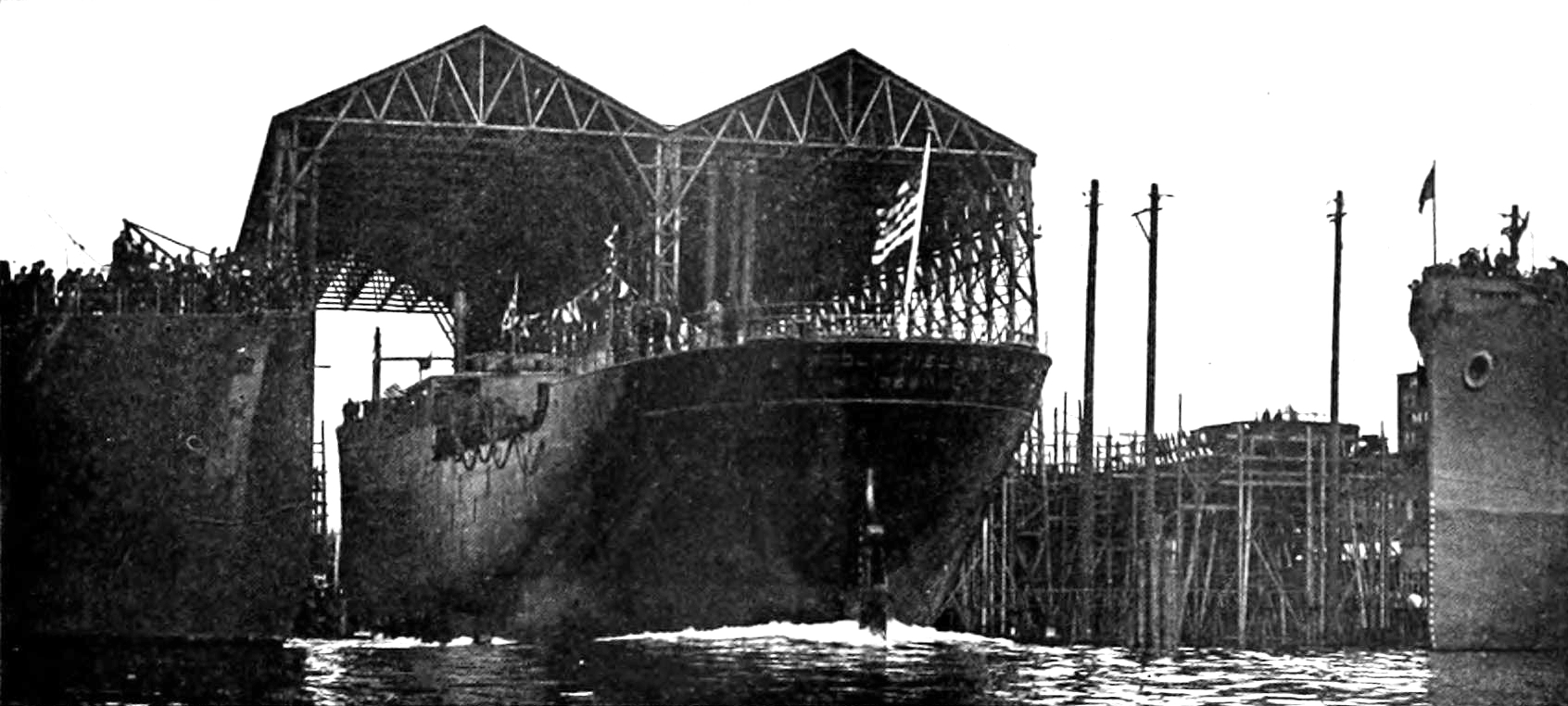
Launch of the freighter Stolt Nielson from the Skinner & Eddy yard on 22 May 1917

The first seven ships built by Skinner & Eddy were for private contractors. The company completed its first ship, Niels Nielson, on November 9, 1916, and had completed a further two by the time the United States entered the war in April 1917. These three ships along with four partially completed vessels were then requisitioned for war service by the newly created United States Shipping Board (USSB). Thereafter, Skinner & Eddy was to build ships exclusively for the USSB, through the latter's agency, the Emergency Fleet Corporation (EFT).

Skinner & Eddy soon began to distinguish itself by its production speed. Prior to its operations, a cargo ship built and delivered in the United States in under 250 days was considered fast, but as early as June 1917, the company under the capable direction of its general manager, David Rodgers, completed a freighter, Stolt Nielson, in under 150 days. In November 1917, the company established a world keel-to-launch production speed record of under 70 days, maintaining and improving on the record over the following five months. In early 1918, another U.S. company briefly established a new world keel-to-launch record of 61 days, but Skinner & Eddy recaptured the record in April with the 55-day launch of West Lianga, a ship that was also completed in the record time of 80 days.

Thereafter, all the company's ships built during the war were each completed in well under 100 days, with a best performance by war's end of 79 days from keel laying to delivery. Good management alone was probably not entirely responsible for the company's outstanding performance however; Skinner & Eddy also paid its employees highly competitive wages, which enabled the company to attract the best and most skilled workers.

The company's improved performance over time is also reflected in its total production figures. In 1917, the company produced a total tonnage of 72,800 tons; the following year it raised production more than threefold, to 232,400 tons. In all, Skinner & Eddy delivered 32 ships to the EFT, including 29 freighters and three tankers, over the course of the war—more than that of any other shipyard in the country.

== Postwar history ==
Since it was a widely held belief in the United States that a shipbuilding boom would follow the end of hostilities, the USSB declined to cancel many of its wartime shipbuilding contracts at the end of the war. In Skinner & Eddy's case, this meant that the company was to complete a further 43 ships for the USSB in the postwar period. In 1920 however, the USSB cancelled a contract for an additional 25 ships, prompting the company to launch a $17 million claim against the government for lost anticipated profits, later reduced to a $9 million claim.

Skinner & Eddy delivered its last ship in February 1920, but failed to secure any further shipbuilding contracts after this date because of the severe postwar shipbuilding slump. In 1923, the Skinner & Eddy shipyard was permanently closed, and the company's proprietors, D.E. Skinner and John Eddy, dissolved their longstanding business partnership. John Eddy returned to the lumber business, and Skinner became sole proprietor of the Skinner & Eddy Corporation, which retained its original name.

Skinner & Eddy now entered the shipping line business with the purchase of the Pacific Steamship Company, which operated from the company's former Plant No. 2. The company also invested heavily in Alaskan salmon canneries. In 1944, Skinner & Eddy bought the Alaska Steamship Company, and in the postwar period also operated a cruise line. D.E. Skinner's grandson, David E. "Ned" Skinner II, discontinued the business in 1971, moving the family assets into real estate. His Skinner Corporation would eventually become one of America's largest private companies.

== The ships ==
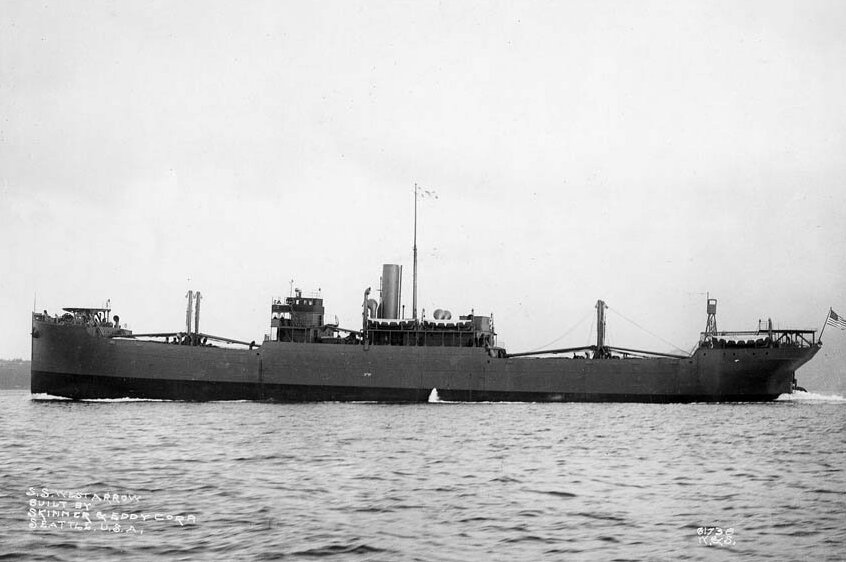
SS West Arrow, one of the first ships built by Skinner & Eddy. This ship was very similar in design to the USSB Design #1013 ships that would later be built by the company

Skinner & Eddy produced a total of 75 ships from 1916 to 1920 (the yard no. sequence ends at 76 as the number 13 was skipped). Most of the ships were freighters, but three 10,000-ton tankers were amongst the seven ships built for private contractors prior to the U.S. entry into World War I.

The company built three different types of standard freighters for the USSB, all of them of Skinner & Eddy's own design. The USSB designated these types as Design 1013, Design 1079 and Design 1105 respectively.

The Design 1013 ships were 8,800 tons deadweight, with a length of 423 feet 9 inches (410 ft between perpendiculars), beam of 54 feet (16 m) and hold depth of 29 feet 9 inches (9.07 m) Some examples of this type of ship were turbine powered and others were fitted with triple expansion engines. Some were also completed as oil fired and others as coal fired vessels. Skinner & Eddy built a total of 24 ships of this type. Most of the ships completed by the company during the war were of this type.

The Design 1079 was of 9,600 tons deadweight, turbine-powered and oil fired, with dimensions of 409.6 x 54.2 x 27.1 feet (8.3 m). Skinner & Eddy was the only company which built this type. A total of 23 were completed. The Design 1105 was also 9,600 tons deadweight, oil-fired and with triple expansion engines. Dimensions were 401.5 x 54.8 x 32.1 feet (9.8 m). Again, Skinner & Eddy was the only company which produced this type. A total of 14 were built.

Additionally, eleven 8,800 deadweight-ton freighters, similar if not identical to the Design 1013s were built prior to the manufacture of the USSB types listed above. All types had a typical service speed of between 11 and 12 knots (22 km/h).

=== In service ===
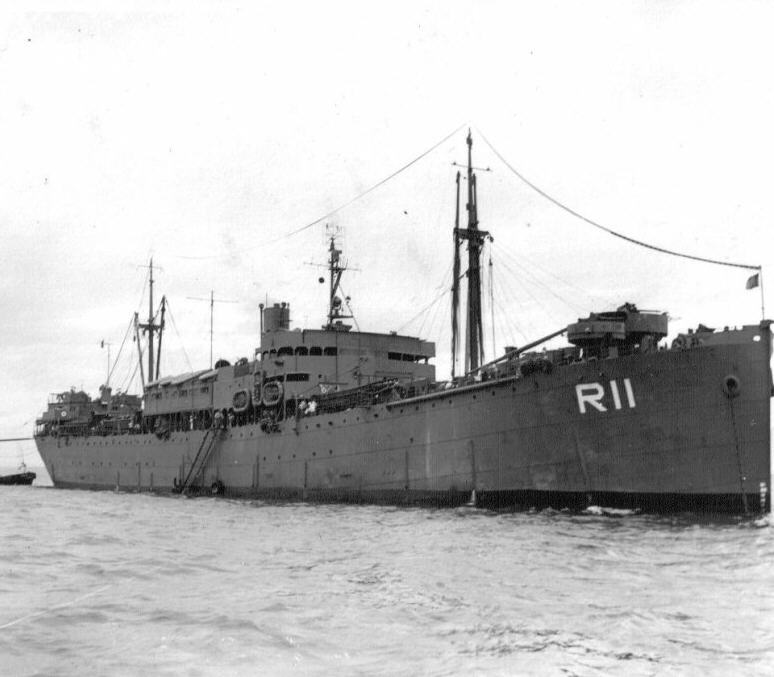
USS Rigel (AD-13), one of three Skinner & Eddy freighters converted into destroyer tenders

Of the first 39 ships built by Skinner & Eddy during and shortly after World War I, 23 were immediately commissioned on completion into the U.S. Navy, and served briefly as supply ships before decommissioning in 1919. A further three were assigned Navy ID's but never commissioned.

In 1921, three Skinner & Eddy ships (including one of those previously assigned a Navy ID) were converted into destroyer tenders and commissioned into the U.S. Navy as USS Altair (AD-11), USS Denebola (AD-12) and USS Rigel (AD-13) respectively. All three of these vessels would remain in Navy service through the end of World War II.

Only one Skinner & Eddy ship was lost (to enemy action) in World War I. In the interwar period, most of the company's vessels were engaged in commercial service. Three, Western Front, Elkton and Nile were lost to maritime accidents in the 1920s, and seven more were scrapped in the 1930s, probably because of the oversupply of shipping.

World War II took a heavy toll of Allied merchant vessels, and of the 64 Skinner & Eddy ships that saw service in the war, 31, or almost 50%, were lost to enemy action, most of them to U-boats. Another two were deliberately sunk as breakwaters during the Normandy Campaign. The 31 that survived the war were mostly scrapped in the late 1940s and 1950s, and only four were still in existence by 1960. The last Skinner & Eddy vessel to see service was probably Edray, transferred to the Soviet Union under lend-lease during World War II and scrapped in 1967.

== Fate of the shipyards ==
Following the closure of the Skinner & Eddy shipyards in 1923, the company's Plant No. 2 was sold in 1924 to the Pacific Steamship Company, which built a new office and terminus on the site. The site also became the terminus of the Admiral Line, which did considerable trade with Siberia and the Orient.

With the onset of the Great Depression in 1929, the site became a Hooverville for Seattle's unemployed. During World War II, the Hooverville was razed to make way for a huge supply depot run by the Army Quartermaster Corps, and after the war it became a base for the U.S. Coast Guard. As of 2003, the site was the location for several large container shipping terminals. Skinner & Eddy's Plant No. 1, meanwhile, has become part of Seattle's SoDo district.

== Production history ==
The following table represents a complete list of all ships built by the Skinner & Eddy Corporation. Ships marked with an asterisk are those assigned ID numbers by the Navy but never commissioned.

Fields marked with a hyphen indicate that the given field is not applicable to this particular ship. Gross tonnage values (GRT) use the nominal GRT for the ship type (identifiable by a "00" in the last two digits) where a more precise GRT is not available for the individual ship. Consult the table legend for additional information about the table.

Ships built by the Skinner & Eddy Corporation, 1916-1920
Name/Image	Yard; # (Note: Yard # = number assigned to the ship by the shipyard, ie, yard number.)	USSB; # (Note: USSB # = number assigned to the ship by the United States Shipping Board.)	Type (Note: Type = ship type.)	Design; # (Note: Design # = design number of the ship.)	GRT (Note: GRT = gross register tonnage.)	Deliv. (Note: Deliv. = delivery date of the ship.)	Fate
Niels Nielsen; Yoshu Maru ^{26}	1	——	Freighter	——	5711	09/11/16	Bombed, 1945
Hanna Nielson; Taian Maru ^{26}	2	——	Freighter	——	5655	22/12/16	Torpedoed 1943
S. V. Harkness; Svithiod ^{26}	3	——	Tanker	——	6400	08/05/17	Scrapped 48
Josiah Macy	4	——	Tanker	——	6400	09/06/17	Scrapped 1950
Stolt Nielson	5	——	Freighter	——	5600	26/06/17	Torpedoed 1918
J. M. Fox ^{y}; USS Jeannette Skinner (ID-1321)	6	——	Freighter	——	5800	20/08/17	Scrapped 1943
Luise Nielsen; Taigen Maru ^{26}	7	——	Freighter	——	5660	10/03/17	Torpedoed 1942
Lt. de Missiessy	8	——	Freighter	——	5600	19/09/17	Scrapped 1933
Martha Washington ^{y}; Nikkosan Maru ^{y}; USS Indiana (ID-1787) ^{18}; USS Western Front (ID-1787) ^{18}; Western Front ^{18}	9	——	Freighter	——	5600	20/10/17	Destroyed by fire and explosion at sea, 1921
War Flame ^{y}; USS West Haven (ID-2159); Marian Otis Chandler ^{29}; Onomea ^{38}; Empire Leopard ^{40}	10	——	Freighter	——	5520	24/12/17	Torpedoed 1942
Trontolite	11	——	Tanker	——	7115	02/02/18	Scrapped 1946
Jas G. Eddy ^{y}; West Arrow* ^{18}; Black Osprey ^{35}	12	——	Freighter	——	5589	26/02/18	Torpedoed 1941
Western Hero	14	83	Freighter	1013	5611	05/01/18	Scrapped 1946
USS Absaroka (ID-2518); Primavista ^{46}; Panenterprise ^{48}; Maryland ^{52}	15	84	Freighter	1013	5600	12/02/18	Scrapped 1954
David Rogers; Westlake; Port Texaco No. 1 ^{32}	16	——	Freighter	——	5600	09/03/18	Scrapped 1951
Elizabeth Gibbs ^{y}; Western Queen; Virginia ^{46}; Virginia II ^{48}	17	——	Freighter	——	5600	25/04/18	Scrapped 1954
Canoga	18	85	Freighter	1013	5600	23/03/18	Scrapped 1933
Ossineke	19	86	Freighter	1013	5600	13/04/18	Scrapped 1931
West Durfee	20	1175	Freighter	1013	5522	16/05/18	Scrapped 1946
USS West Lianga (ID-2758); Helen Whittier ^{29}; Kalani ^{38}; Empire Cheetah ^{40}; Hobbema ^{42}	21	1176	Freighter	1013	5600	04/05/18	Torpedoed 1942
USS West Alsek (ID-3119)	22	87	Freighter	1013	5600	04/06/18	Scrapped 1933
USS West Apaum (ID-3221)	23	88	Freighter	1013	5600	19/06/18	Scrapped 1933
USS West Cohas (ID-3253); Empire Simba ^{40}	24	1177	Freighter	1013	5600	29/06/18	Scuttled 1945
USS West Ekonk (ID-3313); Empire Wildebeeste ^{41}	25	1178	Freighter	1013	5600	13/07/18	Torpedoed 1942
USS West Gambo (ID-3220); Empire Hartebeeste ^{41}	26	1179	Freighter	1013	5600	20/07/18	Torpedoed 1942
West Gotomska; Andelien ^{43}	27	1180	Freighter	1013	5728	07/08/18	Scrapped 1948
USS West Hobomac (ID-3335); Ile de Batz ^{40}	28	1181	Freighter	1013	5600	17/08/18	Torpedoed 1942
USS West Hosokie (ID-3695); West Hosokie; Constance Chandler ^{29}; Liloa ^{38}; Belorussia ^{45}	29	1182	Freighter	1013	5600	29/08/18	Scrapped 1960
USS West Humhaw (ID-3718); West Humhaw ^{19}	30	1183	Freighter	1013	5527	14/09/18	Torpedoed 1944
USS West Lashaway (ID-3700); West Lashaway ^{19}	31	1184	Freighter	1013	5637	30/09/18	Torpedoed 1942
USS West Loquassuck (ID-3638); West Loquassuck ^{19}	32	1185	Freighter	1013	5644	15/10/18	Scrapped 1936
USS West Madaket (ID-3636); West Madaket ^{19}	33	1186	Freighter	1013	5565	30/10/18	Torpedoed 1943
USS West Mahomet (ID-3681); West Mahomet ^{19}	34	1187	Freighter	1013	5600	13/11/18	Scrapped 1938
West Maximus*	35	1188	Freighter	1013	5561	—/04/19	Torpedoed 1943
USS West Cressy (ID-3813); West Cressey ^{19}; Briansk ^{43}; Tallin ^{45}	36	1925	Freighter	1013	5596	—/12/18	Wrecked 1946
USS West Elcajon (ID-3907); West Elcajon ^{19}; Golden Kauri ^{28}; Waipio ^{39}; Paralos II ^{46}	37	1926	Freighter	1013	5548	—/01/19	Scrapped 1954
USS West Elcasco (ID-3661); USAT Henry Gibbins ^{41}	38	1927	Freighter	1013	5766	23/10/18	Torpedoed 1942
USS West Eldara (ID-3704); West Eldara ^{19}; Mae ^{36}	39	1928	Freighter	1013	5607	—/11/18	Torpedoed 1942
USS Edenton (ID-3696); Edenton^{19}; USAT Irvin L. Hunt ^{41}; Edenton ^{46}	40	1731	Freighter	1079	6800	05/12/18	Scrapped 1948
Edgecombe; USS Rigel (AD-13) ^{21}	41	1732	Freighter; Destroyer Tender	1079	6800	24/12/18	Scrapped 1950
Edgefield; Empire Ibex ^{41}	42	1733	Freighter	1079	6800	31/12/18	Collision 1943
Eldena	43	1929	Freighter	1079	6800	—/05/19	Torpedoed 1943
Eldora; Polybius	44	1930	Freighter	1079	7041	—/05/19	Torpedoed 1942
Edgehill; Oremar ^{39}; Mangore ^{48}	45	1734	Freighter	1079	6854	02/04/19	Scrapped 1950
Edgemont; American Sailor ^{40}	46	1735	Freighter	1079	6800	22/04/19	Scrapped 1953
Eldridge; Tacoma ^{28}; Ewa ^{37}; Nogin ^{43}	47	1931	Freighter	1079	6800	—/06/19	Scrapped 1957
Edgemoor; American Seaman ^{39}	48	1736	Freighter	1079	6800	08/05/19	Scrapped 1952
Edgewood; USS Denebola (AD-12) ^{21}; Edgewood	49	1737	Freighter; Destroyer tender	1079	6800	—/05/19	Scrapped 1950
Elmsport; Kenmar ^{39}	50	1932	Freighter	1079	6844	—/07/19	Wrecked, 1945
Edisto; USS Altair (AD-11) ^{21}; Edisto ^{46}	51	1738	Freighter; Destroyer tender	1079	6800	—/06/19	Scrapped 1947
Elkader; Colorado Springs; Marymar ^{39}	52	1933	Freighter	1079	6847	—/07/19	Scrapped 1947
Edmore; Grays Harbor ^{28}; Honomu ^{37}	53	1739	Freighter	1079	6800	—/07/19	Torpedoed 1942
Wheatland Montana; Seattle ^{28}; Lihue ^{37}	54	1934	Freighter	1079	6800	—/08/19	Torpedoed 1942
Edray; City of Spokane; Olympia ^{28}; Hamakua ^{37}; Kuibyshev ^{45}	55	1740	Freighter	1105	6400	—/07/19	Scrapped 1967
Stanley; Empire Pelican ^{41}	56	1935	Freighter	1105	6463	—/08/19	Torpedoed 1941
Eelbeck; Empire Bunting ^{41}	57	1741	Freighter	1105	6318	—/08/19	Sunk as breakwater, 1944
Elkridge; Golden Star ^{28}; Tennessean ^{37}; Empire Penguin ^{40}; Van de Velde ^{42}; Rijnland ^{47}; Vaptistis ^{57}	58	1936	Freighter	1105	6379	—/08/19	Scrapped 1959
Elkhorn; Port Texaco No. 4 ^{36}	59	1937	Freighter	1105	6400	—/09/19	Scrapped 1951
Editor; Empire Dunlin ^{41}; Norlom ^{42}	60	1938	Freighter	1105	6400	—/09/19	Bombed, 1943
Endicott; Empire Mermaid ^{40}	61	1939	Freighter	1105	6400	—/09/19	Torpedoed 1941
Elkton	62	1940	Freighter	1105	6400	—/09/19	Mss 27
Brave Coeur; Empire Gull ^{41}	63	1941	Freighter	1105	6458	—/10/19	Torpedoed 1942
Cripple Creek	64	1942	Freighter	1105	6400	—/10/19	Torpedoed 1942
Crisfield; Golden Horn ^{28}; Kaimoku ^{38}	65	1943	Freighter	1105	6400	—/10/19	Torpedoed 1942
Effna	66	1743	Freighter	1105	6400	—/11/19	Torpedoed 1941
Effingham	67	1742	Freighter	1105	6400	—/11/19	Torpedoed 1942
Eglantine; Empire Buffalo ^{40}	68	1744	Freighter	1105	6325	—/11/19	Torpedoed 1942
Egremont; Calobre ^{41}; Borodino ^{45}	69	1745	Freighter	1079	7000	—/11/19	Scrapped 1963
Nile	70	1944	Freighter	1079	7000	—/12/19	Wrecked 1927
Jadden; J. B. White ^{41}	71	1945	Freighter	1079	7000	—/12/19	Torpedoed 1941
Crosskeys; Golden Peak ^{28}; Utahan ^{37}; Futura ^{51}	72	1946	Freighter	1079	7031	—/12/19	Scrapped 1960
Crown Point; Robin Hood	73	1947	Freighter	1079	6887	—/12/19	Torpedoed 1942
Crowswind; Robin Adair; Bonaventure ^{46}	74	1948	Freighter	1079	6895	—/01/20	Scrapped 1952
Croydon; Robin Gray	75	1949	Freighter	1079	6896	—/01/20	Sunk as breakwater, 1944
Crystal Spring; Robin Goodfellow	76	1950	Freighter	1079	6885	—/02/20	Torpedoed 1944

LEGEND: Yard No. = yard number; USSB No. = USSB number; Name = name of ship. Two digit field (in superscript) following names in this colum indicates last two digits of year in which ship was renamed. Names followed by a "y" (in superscript) indicate a yard name that was not subsequently used during the ship's service history. Type = type of ship, either freighter or tanker. Design No. = USSB Design number. Ships with no listed number were built prior to the introduction of the system. GRT = gross register tons. Ships for which an exact tonnage is not available are listed here with the nominal GRT of the type, usually recognizable by the last two digits being zero. Deliv. = date of ship's delivery to customer. For some ships the exact date is not known. Fate = fate of ship.
Sources for this table: Pacific Ports Annual pp. 63–64, 402-405; Jordan; shipbuildinghistory.com; and various individual DANFS ship entries.

== See also ==
- Category:Ships built by Skinner & Eddy

== Footnotes and references ==
=== Sources ===
Books and journals

- Dictionary of American Naval Fighting Ships (DANFS), various entries.
- McKellar, Norman L. (1963): "Steel Shipbuilding under the U.S. Shipping Board, 1917-1923", The Belgian Shiplover, Issues 87-96, May 1962-December 1963.
- Pacific Ports Annual, Fifth Edition, 1919, pp. 64–65, 402-405, Pacific Ports Inc.

Websites

- "Skinner & Eddy, Seattle WA", shipbuildinghistory.com.
- "General Cargo Ships Built in Pacific Coast Shipyards", shipbuildinghistory.com.
- Historylink.org.
