= USS Altair =

USS Altair, USNS Altair, or SS Altair has been the name of more than one United States Navy ship, and may refer to:

- USS Altair (AD-11), a destroyer tender in commission from 1921 to 1946
- USS Altair (AK-257) (ex-SS Aberdeen Victory), in commission as a cargo ship (AK-257) from 1952 to 1953 and as a stores issue ship (AKS-32) from 1953 to 1969
- SS Altair (T-AKR-291), ex-USNS Altair (T-AK-291), a fast sealift ship placed in non-commissioned service in the Military Sealift Command in 1985 and in reserve since 2008
