= SS West Madaket =

American steam cargo ship

Coordinates: 55°8′N 42°43′W

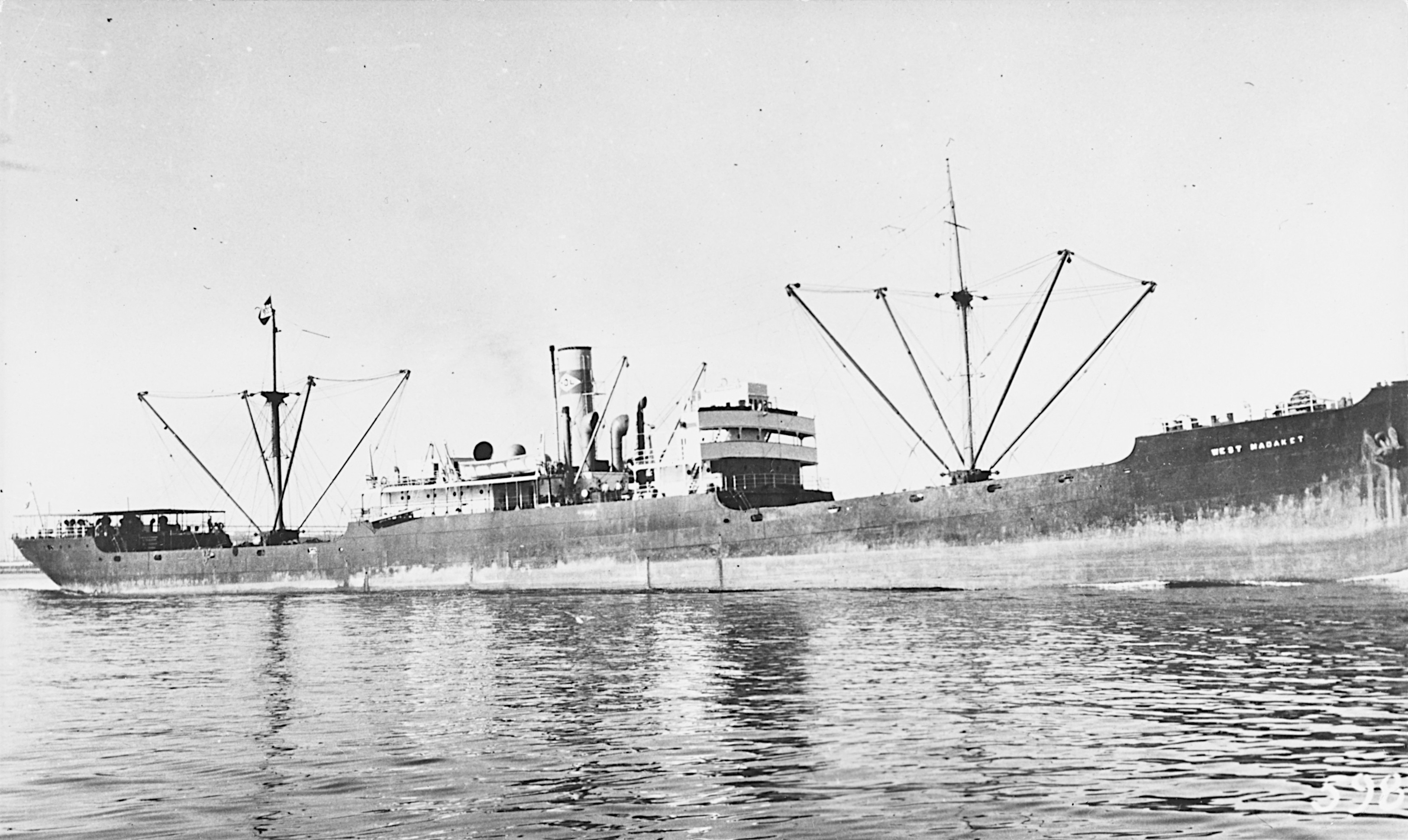
- West Madaket in merchant service

History

United States
- Name: West Madaket
- Namesake: Madaket
- Owner: USSB (1919–1931); Waterman Steamship Corp. (1931–1943)
- Port of registry: Seattle (1919–1931); Mobile (1931–1943)
- Builder: Skinner & Eddy, Seattle
- Yard number: 33
- Laid down: 31 July 1918
- Launched: 5 October 1918
- Commissioned: 30 October 1918
- Maiden voyage: 18 November 1918
- Identification: US official number: 217176; code letters LNQF (1919–1933); call sign WJOO (1934–1943)
- Fate: Sunk, 5 May 1943

United States
- Name: USS West Madaket
- Operator: US Navy (1918–1919)
- Acquired: 31 October 1918
- Commissioned: 31 October 1918
- Decommissioned: 8 May 1919
- Fate: Returned to owners 8 May 1919

General characteristics
- Type: Design 1013 ship
- Tonnage: 5,654 GRT(1918–1933); 5,565 GRT(1934–1943); 4,099 NRT(1918–1933); 3,483 NRT(1934–1943); 8,573 DWT
- Displacement: 12,225 tons (normal)
- Length: 409.6 ft (124.8 m)
- Beam: 54.2 ft (16.5 m)
- Draft: 24 ft 2 1/2 in (7.379 m) (loaded)
- Depth: 27.1 ft (8.3 m)
- Decks: 2
- Installed power: 2,500 ihp
- Propulsion: General Electric Co. steam turbine, double reduction geared to one screw
- Speed: 11 1/2 knots (13.2 mph; 21.3 km/h)
- Complement: 94

West Madaket was a steam cargo ship built in 1918–1919 by Skinner & Eddy Corporation of Seattle for the United States Shipping Board as part of the wartime shipbuilding program of the Emergency Fleet Corporation (EFC) to restore the nation's Merchant Marine.

== Construction ==
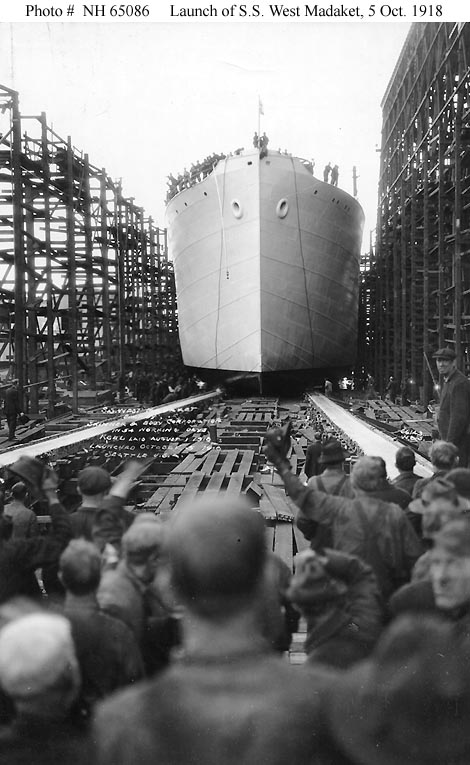
West Madaket is launched on 5 October 1918, at the Skinner and Eddy Corporation shipyard at Seattle, Washington.

West Madaket was built in 1918 as a commercial cargo ship at Seattle, Washington by the Skinner and Eddy Corporation. Launched on 5 October 1918, she was acquired by the U.S. Navy for World War I service upon completion on 31 October 1918, assigned naval registry Identification Number (Id. No.) 3636, and commissioned the same day as USS West Madaket at Puget Sound Navy Yard, Bremerton, Washington.

Assigned to the Naval Overseas Transportation Service, West Madaket completed her sea trials too late to see service before World War I ended on 11 November 1918. She departed for the United States East Coast on 18 November 1918 with a cargo of 7,031 tons of flour consigned to European food relief. Voyaging via the Panama Canal, she arrived at New York City on 16 December 1918 and departed on 22 December 1918, bound for Europe. She made port at Falmouth, England, on 5 January 1919 and pushed on, that same day, for Rotterdam, the Netherlands, where she discharged her cargo until 23 January 1919.

Returning to New York on 9 February 1919, West Madaket loaded 6,841 tons of general cargo and made a voyage to Le Verdon-sur-Mer, France, returning to New York on 28 April 1919.

West Madaket was decommissioned on 8 May 1919 at Newport News, Virginia, and was transferred to the United States Shipping Board on the same day.

Once again SS West Madaket, she remained in the custody of the Shipping Board until the United States Maritime Commission was established and replaced the Shipping Board in 1936. She then continued in Maritime Commission service into World War II. On 5 May 1943, while steaming with Convoy ONS 5, she was torpedoed and sunk in the Atlantic Ocean by U-584.
