= Altaír Tejeda de Tamez =

Mexican short story writer, poet, playwright and journalist

Altaír Tejeda de Tamez (October 23, 1922 – September 17, 2015) was a Mexican short story writer, poet, playwright and journalist.

== Biography ==
Altaír Tejeda Treviño was born on October 23, 1922, in Ciudad Victoria, Tamaulipas, Mexico, to Rafael Tejeda Puente and Elvira Treviño, both of them professors. She studied at the Leona Vicario elementary school, and made her secondary studies at the Normal and Preparatory School of Tamaulipas, finishing her studies at the Teacher's National School in Mexico City as Elementary School Professor. She went on to study a master's degree in Spanish Language and Literature at the Faculty of Philosophy and Letters at the National Autonomous University of Mexico.

Treviño married Santiago Tamez Anguiano with whom she had three children: Antonio, Marisela and Jorge. She worked in the education field as an elementary school teacher, and as advanced Spanish, literature and literary and composition theory professor. As a columnist Treviño wrote for the El Diario de Ciudad Victoria newspaper; some of her articles have been compiled in a book titled Buenos días, Victoria. Treviño died on September 17, 2015.

== Works ==
=== Short story ===
- El perro acomplejado (1958)
- El cementerio de las palabras (1980)
- Ochenta ventanas para asomarse al mundo (1983)
- Crónicas y cuentos (1985)
- Buenos días, Victoria (1987)
- Estrategia (1989)
- Variaciones para un tema de rosa (1993)
- Los signos secretos (1997)
- Antología de cuentos (2001)

=== Novel ===
- Ménage à trois (1990)

=== Drama ===
- Otoño muere en primavera (1959)
- Yerbabuena y otras piezas (1983), comprising the following stories: Canasta, Buenos noches, soledad, Los fantasmas del espejo roto and Yerbabuena.
- Los mutantes y otras piezas (1985)

=== Poetry ===
- XXX Minutos, ensayo de poesía (1952)
- Acroama (1961)
- Fuensanta (1966)
- Homenaje a "Saltillo 400" (1977)
- Azares de amor y muerte (1979)
- Palabras sencillas: antología poética (1980)

=== Essay ===
- El péndulo: el mundo interior de Ramón López Velarde a través de su poesía y otros ensayos (1980)
