= SS West Cressey =

- SS West Cressey in the Manchester Ship Canal, date unknown

History
- Name: SS West Cressey
- Owner: U.S. Shipping Board
- Builder: Skinner & Eddy
- Yard number: 36 (USSB #1925)
- Launched: 21 September 1918
- Acquired: 17 December 1918
- Commissioned: 17 December 1918–13 May 1919
- In service: 17 December 1918–1930?; 1941–4 September 1946
- Renamed: USS West Cressey (ID-3813) 1918; West Cressey 1919; Briansk I 1943; Tallin 1945
- Fate: Stranded off Kamchatsky Cape, 4 September 1946

General characteristics
- Type: Design 1013 cargo ship
- Tonnage: 5,600 gross, 8,800 dwt
- Displacement: 12,225 tons
- Length: 423 ft 9 in (129.16 m); 410 ft 5 in (125.10 m) bp
- Beam: 54 ft (16 m)
- Draft: 24 ft 2 in (7.37 m)
- Depth of hold: 29 ft 9 in (9.07 m)
- Installed power: 1 × vertical triple expansion
- Propulsion: Single propeller
- Speed: 11 kn (20 km/h)
- Complement: USN: 81; Merchant: 32
- Armament: None

SS West Cressey was a steel-hulled cargo ship that saw a brief period of service as an auxiliary with the U.S. Navy in the aftermath of World War I.

West Cressey was built in 1918 for the United States Shipping Board's emergency wartime shipbuilding program. Delivered just too late to see service in the war, the ship was quickly commissioned into the Navy regardless, as USS West Cressey (ID-3813), but completed only two Navy missions—including a famine relief mission to Romania—before decommissioning a few months later.

Through the 1920s, the ship operated in a commercial capacity as SS West Cressey. She was laid up for much of the 1930s through lack of work, but eventually re-entered service in 1941 as mounting losses to German U-boats in the Battle of the Atlantic had increased the demand for shipping.

Sold in 1943 to the Soviet Union under lend-lease, West Cressey was renamed SS Briansk I and later SS Tallinn. The ship survived the war, but was lost in a storm off Cape Kamchatsky in 1946.

== Construction and design ==
West Cressey was built in Seattle, Washington in 1918 by the Skinner & Eddy Corporation—the 21st in a series of 24 Design 1013 cargo ships built by the company for the USSB's emergency wartime shipbuilding program. The first ship launched from the company's No. 2 Plant, West Cressey's launch took place on 21 September, just sixty days after the laying of her keel.

West Cressey had a design deadweight tonnage of 8,800 tons and gross register tonnage of 5,600. She had an overall length of 423 feet 9 inches, a beam of 54 feet and a draft of 24 feet 2 inches. The ship was powered by a triple expansion reciprocating steam engine, driving a single screw propeller and delivering a speed of 11 knots. Since the ship was completed too late to see wartime service, she was not provided with any armament.

== Service history ==
=== U.S. Navy service, 1918-1919 ===
West Cressey was delivered to the Navy on 17 December 1918 and commissioned the same day at the Puget Sound Navy Yard for operation with the Naval Overseas Transportation Service (NOTS) as USS West Cressey (ID-3813).

West Cressey's first and only voyage to Europe under Navy command began in January 1919 when the ship loaded a cargo of flour bound for Romania as part of a postwar famine relief mission. Sailing for the east coast of the U.S. on 12 January, West Cressey transited the Panama Canal and arrived at Norfolk, Virginia on 2 February. Here the ship was delayed for a few days for alterations and repairs, until departing for the Mediterranean on the 12th.

Calling at Gibraltar en route, West Cressey reached Constantinople, Turkey, on 10 March and discharged her cargo. She then loaded a large quantity of opium to be used for medicinal purposes along with a cargo of tobacco for the return journey to the U.S., departing 27 March. By 28 April West Cressey was back in New York City. On 13 May 1919, she was decommissioned and returned to control of the U.S. Shipping Board, thus ending her brief career with the Navy.

=== Merchant service ===
Following her decommission, West Cressey was placed into mercantile service by the USSB as SS West Cressey. Records of the ship's movements after this point are scarce. The vessel is known to have made a voyage from Rotterdam, the Netherlands to New York City in 1920 which indicates that she may have been engaged in regular transatlantic service. By 1927, the ship was operating for the Texas Oceanic Line, making a voyage in December of that year from Galveston, Texas to Liverpool, England. With the onset of the Great Depression in 1929, the scale of international trade fell sharply and many ships were mothballed in this period due to lack of work, West Cressey included. Laid up at New Orleans in the early 1930s, the USSB had ceased to maintain the vessel by 1933.

Unlike many of her contemporaries however, West Cressey was to escape the scrap merchants' yard, and following the outbreak of World War II in 1939, steadily mounting losses of merchant ships to U-boats revived the demand for shipping tonnage. In order to help meet this demand, the successor to the USSB, the Maritime Commission, in addition to its orders for new tonnage, implemented a reconditioning program for older ships previously laid up. West Cressey became one of the ships so reconditioned, and in March 1941 she was placed back into service with the Grace Line for a monthly charter price of $16,486. Following this revival of fortune, West Cressey appears to have been employed for the next few months in a shuttle service between Los Angeles and Honolulu.

On 20 August 1941 the ship was purchased by the War Shipping Administration (WSA) and placed in service in Seattle, Washington operated by the American Mail Line acting as the WSA agent. From 19 May until 13 July 1942 the ship was operating under control of the United States Army in the Southwest Pacific Area without being assigned a local fleet X number.

On 26 January 1943, West Cressey was transferred at San Francisco to the Soviet Union under lend-lease, and renamed SS Briansk I. Her activities are not known after this point, but in 1945 she was renamed SS Tallin. Tallinn survived the war, but was stranded and lost off Cape Kamchatsky on 4 September 1946.

== Bibliography ==
- Pacific Ports Inc. (1919): Pacific Ports Annual, Fifth Edition, 1919, pp. 64-65, 402-405, Pacific Ports Inc.
- Silverstone, Paul H. (2006): The New Navy, 1883-1922, Routledge, ISBN 978-0-415-97871-2.
