= Alternation =

Alternation or AlterNation may refer to:

- Alternation (complexity), a resource in computational complexity theory
- Alternation (formal language theory), the set union of two sets of strings in formal language theory and pattern matching
- Alternation (geometry), a geometric operation for deriving polytopes from other polytopes
- Alternation (linguistics), a variation in the phonological form of a morpheme
- Diathesis alternation, a linguistics term relating to verb use
- R/N alternation; see Rhotacism (sound change)
- Logical disjunction, the or function
- AlterNation, a show on NE1 FM
- WSTB, a radio station in Streetsboro, Ohio known as The AlterNation
