= Altar (2016 film) =

- Poster
- Directed by: Matt Sconce
- Written by: Matt Sconce
- Cinematography: Matt Sconce
- Edited by: Matt Sconce
- Distributed by: Film Volt
- Release date: 2016
- Country: United States
- Language: English

Altar is a 2016 found footage horror movie that was written and directed by Matt Sconce.

Sconce has voiced interest in creating a sequel entitled Altar: Unleashed if the film were to perform well.

== Synopsis ==
The film follows Maisy and her friends, who have gathered together to search through a remote forest for a couple who has gone missing. Along for the trip is Maisy's autistic brother Bo, who is recording the proceedings. The group's car breaks down during the car trip, at which point a strange local man named Ripper stops and menacingly warns them to return home. The group ignore him and continue on, choosing to camp in the same forest where their friends went missing. As the film progresses tensions in the group rise, particularly after they discover a strange altar and a bloodied, abandoned campsite. The group decides to try and hike back to civilization, however as they travel they find themselves getting picked off one by one. The film ends with Bo getting possessed by a supernatural entity via a stone he obtained from the altar and slaughtering his sister Maisy before wandering off on his own.

== Cast ==
- Stefanie Estes as Maisy Marks
- Jesse Parr as Bo Marks
- Deep Singh as Ravi Dara
- Brittany Falardeau as Chelsea Rich
- Tim Parrish as Asher James
- Jessica Strand as Pamela Kensington
- Dave Johnson as Dave Phillips
- Catherine Wilcox as Stephanie Phillips
- Michael Wainwright as Ripper

== Development ==
Filming for Altar took place in Oakhurst and Bass Lake, California. Rather than utilize a traditional script, Sconce chose to have his actors improv their lines based on a tight outline. He also had the actors carpool together from Los Angeles to the filming site so their interactions would appear more natural. Filming for the summer scenes took place over a period of three days; the winter scenes took two.

== Release ==
Altar screened at several film festivals during 2016 before having a premiere on May 17, 2017 at the Crest Theatre in Fresno, California.

== Reception ==
Common elements of praise for the film centered around Jesse Parr as Bo, as well as the characters acting in a way the reviewers felt would be realistic for the scenario. Criticism focused on the film largely retreading familiar ground in the found footage horror subgenre. Matt Boiselle of Dread Central noted that the film "begs one watch for those who really dig these types of films, and while it won’t knock your flip-flops off, it’ll at least satiate the found-footage viewer for a short spell until the next bout of motion-sickness decides to infiltrate our DVD and Blu-ray players."

=== Awards ===
- Best Actress Feature at the Austin Revolution Film Festival (2016, won - Stefanie Estes)
- Audience Choice: U.S. Feature at the Austin Revolution Film Festival (2016, won)
- Best Horror Feature at the Austin Revolution Film Festival (2016, won)
