= USS Altair (AD-11) =

Tender of the United States Navy

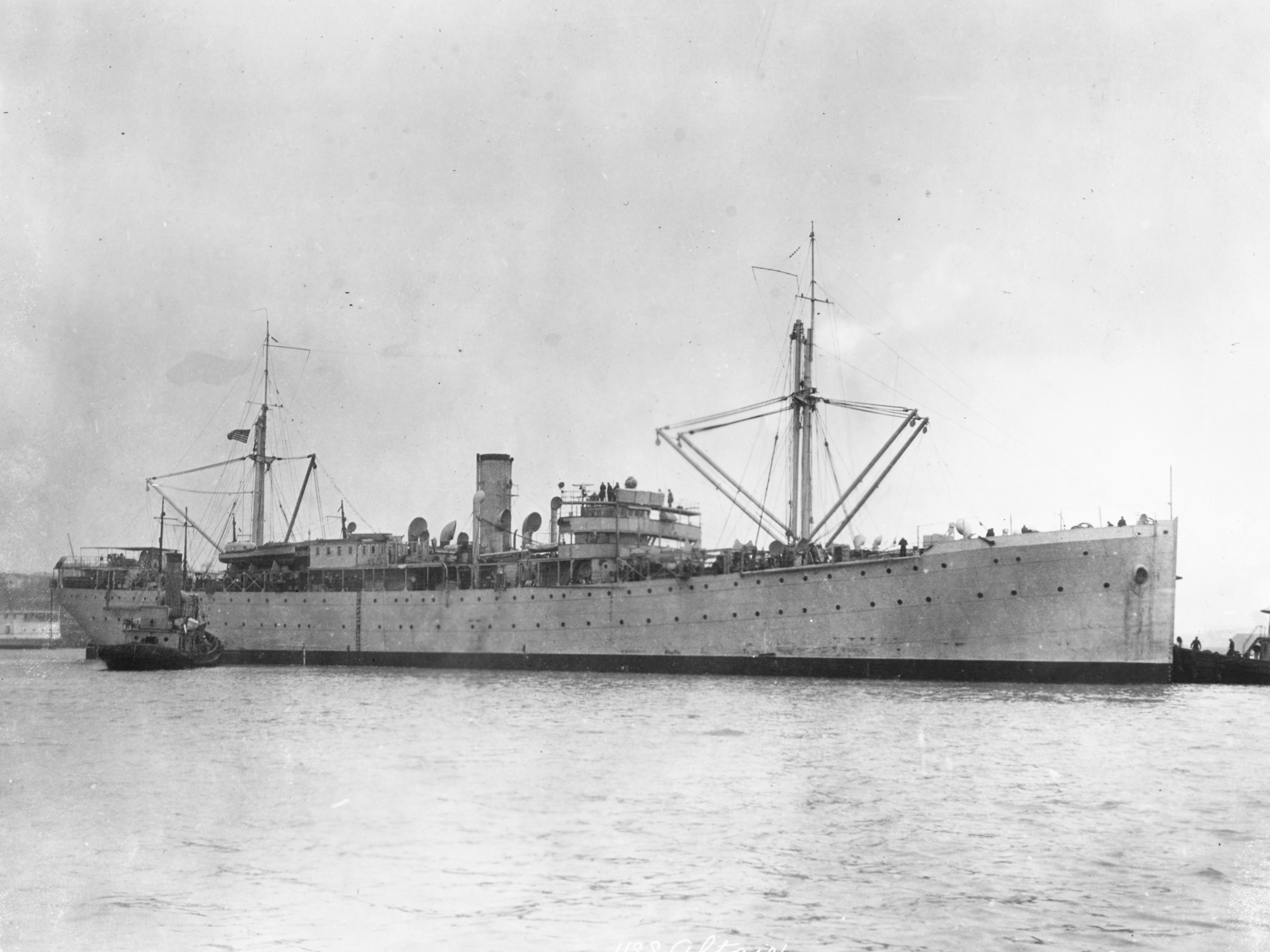
- USS Altair in 1921.

History

United States
- Name: SS Edisto
- Operator: United States Shipping Board
- Builder: Skinner & Eddy Corporation, Seattle Washington
- Laid down: 18 December 1918
- Launched: 10 May 1919
- Fate: Transferred to U.S. Navy 29 October 1921; Delivered to U.S. Navy 5 December 1921

United States
- Name: USS Altair
- Namesake: Altair, the brightest star in the constellation Aquila
- Operator: United States Navy
- Acquired: Transferred to U.S. Navy 29 October 1921; Named USS Altair 2 November 1921; Delivered to U.S. Navy 5 December 1921
- Commissioned: 6 December 1921
- Decommissioned: 8 July 1946
- Stricken: 21 July 1946
- Fate: Transferred to United States Maritime Commission 8 July 1946; Sold 9 March 1948; Scrapped

General characteristics as destroyer tender
- Type: Altair-class destroyer tender
- Displacement: 6,250 long tons (6,350 t) light; 10,000 long tons (10,160 t) full
- Length: 423 ft 9 in (129.16 m)
- Beam: 54 ft 3 in (16.54 m)
- Draft: 20 ft 7 in (6.27 m)
- Propulsion: Geared turbine, single propeller
- Speed: 10.5 knots (19.4 km/h; 12.1 mph)
- Complement: 481 officers and enlisted
- Armament: 4 × 5 in (130 mm) guns; 2 × 3 in (76 mm) guns (authorized but never installed)

USS Altair (AD-11) was the lead ship of a class of three United States Navy destroyer tenders. She was named for Altair, the brightest star in the constellation Aquila, and was in commission from 1921 to 1946, seeing service during World War II.

== Service history ==
=== United States Shipping Board, 1919–1921 ===
Altair was laid down as the steel-hulled, single-screw cargo ship SS Edisto under a United States Shipping Board (USSB) contract on 18 December 1918 at Seattle, Washington, by the Skinner & Eddy Corporation. Launched on 10 May 1919, Edisto came under U.S. Navy scrutiny in the 13th Naval District, being given the identification number (Id. No.) 4156 and initially earmarked for potential service as a collier. After a brief period of operation by the USSB, Edisto was transferred to the Navy by executive order on 29 October 1921 and renamed USS Altair (AD-11) on 2 November 1921. Classified as a destroyer tender, she was delivered to the Navy on 5 December 1921 and commissioned at the New York Navy Yard in Brooklyn, New York, the following day, 6 December 1921.

=== 1921–1939 ===
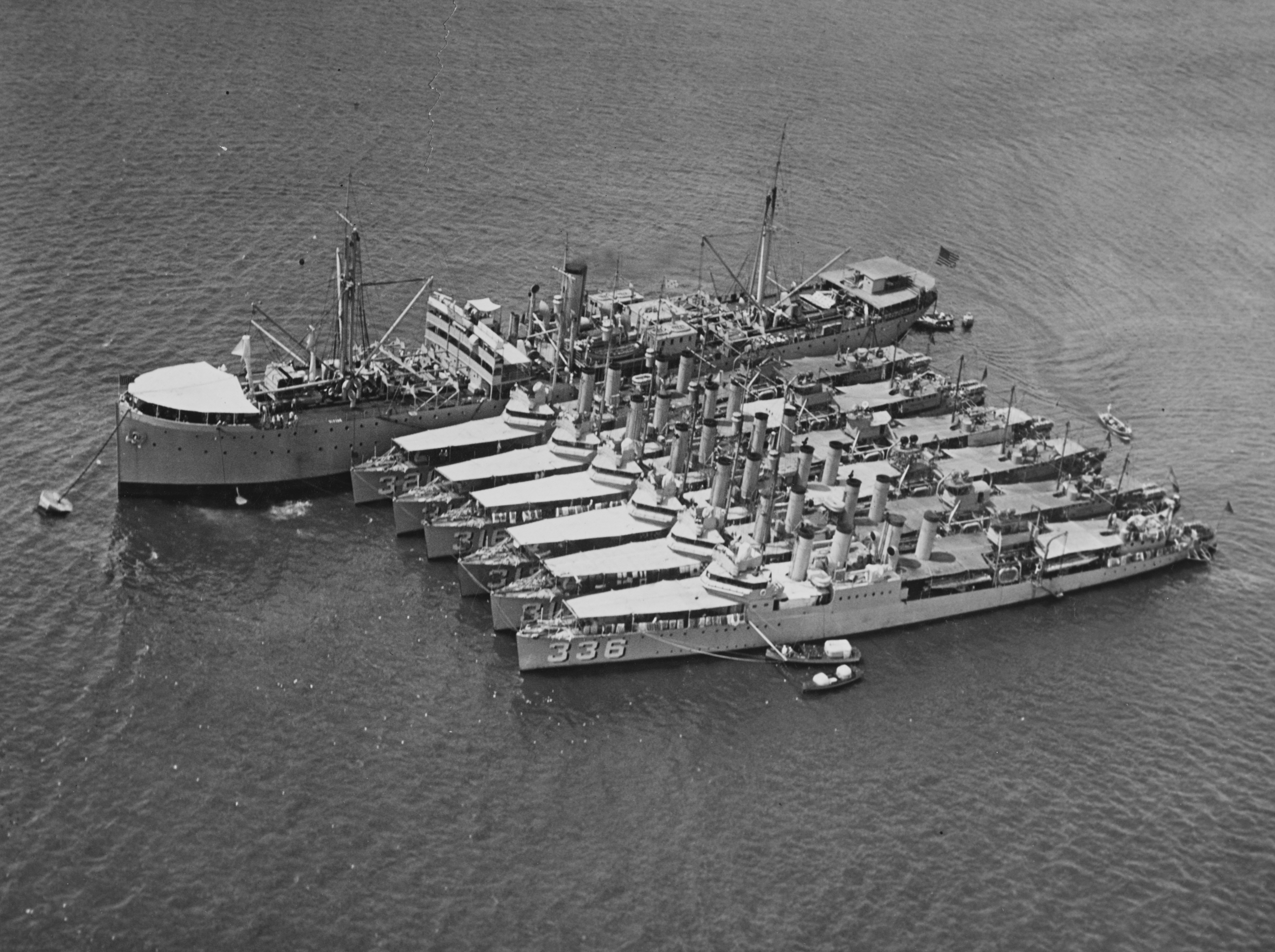
Altair with destroyers at Pearl Harbor, Hawaii, on 8 February 1925. Among the destroyers alongside her are USS Marcus (DD-321), next to Altair; USS Sloat (DD-316), third outboard of Altair; and USS Litchfield (DD-336), furthest outboard.

Converted to a destroyer tender at the New York Navy Yard, and equipped with surplus and salvaged machine tools and shop equipment selected from dismantled U.S. Navy and United States Army war plants in the demobilization after World War I, Altair underwent her metamorphosis in nine months and then fitted out at her conversion yard into late November 1922. She then proceeded to the west coast of the United States via Newport, Rhode Island; Hampton Roads, Virginia, and the Panama Canal Zone, reaching San Diego, California, on 17 December 1922. She was assigned to Destroyer Squadron 12, Destroyer Squadrons, Battle Fleet — a unit of 19 destroyers (one "leader" and three six-ship divisions) operating at that time with 84% complements as part of the "rotating reserve." From 1922 to 1939, Altair followed her destroyers and provided support services wherever required, performing work that varied from simple repairs to reblading turbines. She underwent yearly upkeep at the Mare Island Navy Yard at6 Mare Island in Vallejo, California.

In 1925, Altair supported her assigned destroyers in Hawaiian waters during joint U.S. Army-U.S. Navy maneuvers designed to test Hawaii's defenses, and that summer and autumn, when the United States Fleet carried out an Australian cruise, Altair visited Tutuila, American Samoa; Port Phillip, Australia; and Lyttelton, New Zealand. In 1926, the occupation of Nicaragua prompted the dispatch of sailors and Marines from ships of the Special Service Squadron, and later from other ships in the fleet. However, "as the danger points moved inland", the United States Secretary of the Navy's report for 1928 states, "it became advisable to use Marines for this duty." Accordingly, a Marine expeditionary force, some 3,000-men strong, was dispatched to Nicaragua early in 1927. Altair participated in this troop lift, when she and the destroyer tender USS Melville (AD-2) transported Marine Observation Squadron 1 and a rifle company from San Diego to Corinto, a port on the west coast of Nicaragua, reaching their destination on 16 February 1927. Altair then resumed her operations providing services to the destroyers of Squadron 12, accompanying them to Narragansett Bay in Rhode Island for tactical exercises before ultimately returning once more to San Diego.

=== 1939–1941 ===
When World War II began in Europe in the autumn of 1939, Altair was tending Destroyer Squadrons 4 and 6, of Destroyer Flotilla 2, Battle Force, still based at San Diego. In March 1940, however, to service the destroyers of the Hawaiian Detachment sent to Pearl Harbor in December 1939, Altair was shifted to Pearl Harbor. En route to her new duty station, she served as plane guard for U.S. Navy Consolidated PBY Catalina flying boats being ferried to Oahu, arriving at Pearl Harbor on 16 April 1940. She tended destroyers there through the end of 1940 and into 1941 as the fleet based permanently on Pearl Harbor following the conclusion of Fleet Problem XXI.

Overhauled at Mare Island Navy Yard from 6 April to 6 June 1941, Altair returned to Pearl Harbor on 26 June 1941. For the next three months she discharged her duty there until she departed Hawaiian waters on 30 September 1941 for the U.S. West Coast. Pausing briefly at San Diego from 12 to 18 October 1941, the ship pushed south, transited the Panama Canal on 2 and 3 November 1941, and arrived at her new duty station, Hamilton, Bermuda, on 11 November 1941, to provide support for destroyers operating on the Neutrality Patrol in the North Atlantic Ocean.

=== World War II ===
==== 1941–1943 ====
After the Japanese attack on Pearl Harbor brought the United States into World War II on 7 December 1941, Altair maintained a routine of carrying out upkeep and repairs on United States Atlantic Fleet destroyers at Bermuda that continued into the summer of 1942. Underway for San Juan, Puerto Rico, on 3 July 1942 escorted by the destroyers USS Bernadou (DD-153) and USS Cole (DD-155), Altair arrived at her destination on 6 July 1942, detaching the two destroyers and picking up another, USS Hilary P. Jones (DD-427), which escorted the tender to Trinidad, where she arrived on 11 July 1942. Except for brief periods at Aruba and Curaçao in the Dutch West Indies in early September 1942, Altair tended destroyers at Trinidad through mid-July 1943.

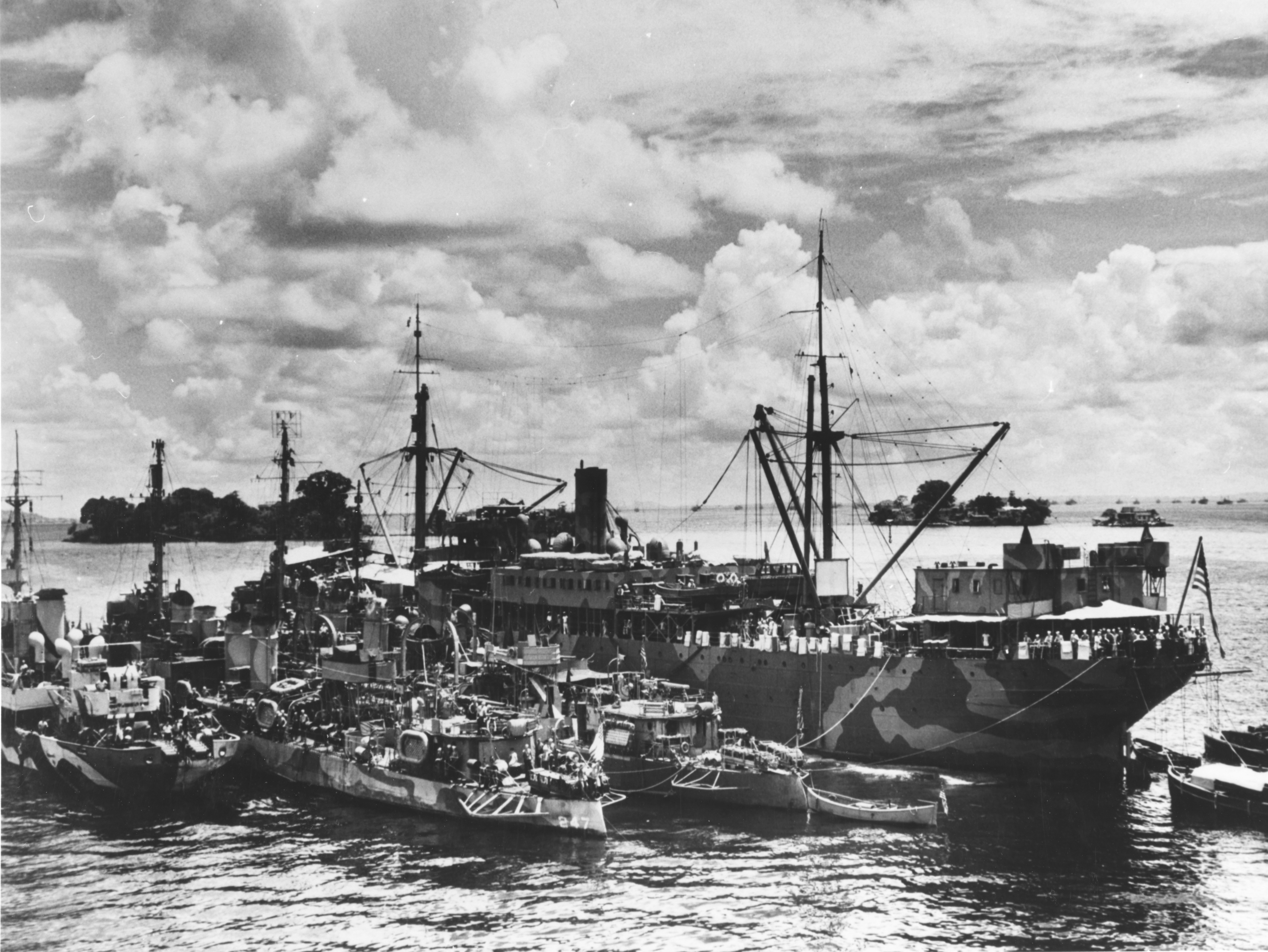
Altair in what appears to be Measure 12 (modified) camouflage, moored at Port of Spain, Trinidad, on 1 October 1942, tending the gunboat USS Spry (PG-64), the destroyers USS Bainbridge (DD-246) and USS Goff (DD-247), and the Royal Netherlands Navy minelayer and patrol vessel HNLMS Jan van Brakel (M-80).

==== 1943–1946 ====
Following repairs at the Norfolk Navy Yard in Portsmouth, Virginia, Altair reported to Commander, Operational Training Command, Atlantic Fleet, on 21 August 1943 and soon resumed active tender operations at Bermuda, this time in support of the destroyer and destroyer escort shakedown group (Task Group 23.1) until shifted to Guantanamo Bay Naval Base, Cuba, where she arrived on 11 March 1945. Providing tender services at Guantánamo Bay until 3 May 1945, Altair then returned to the Norfolk Navy Yard to prepared for service in the Pacific theater. While the ship was on her way, Nazi Germany surrendered unconditionally and the European war ended on 8 May 1945. Prepared for "distant service," Altair emerged from the Norfolk Navy Yard on 26 July 1945 and set course for the Pacific. Arriving in the Panama Canal Zone on 4 August 1945, the ship was still there when hostilities with Japan ended on 14 August 1945 (15 August 1945 on the other side of the International Date Line in the Western Pacific and East Asia.

Altair departed the Panama Cana Zone for Pearl Harbor on 15 August 1945. She reached Pearl Harbor on 6 September 1945 and provided tender services to small ships and craft into the early spring of 1946. She departed Hawaiian waters for the last time on 27 April 1946 and reached San Francisco, California, on 8 May 1945, slated for disposal within the 12th Naval District.

=== Decommissioning and disposal ===
Decommissioned at the Mare Island Naval Shipyard (formerly the Mare Island Navy Yard) on 21 June 1946, Altair was transferred to the United States Maritime Commission on 8 July 1946, and her name was struck from the Naval Vessel Register on 21 July 1946. Laid up in the National Defense Reserve Fleet's Suisun Bay, California, berthing area, the ship remained there until sold on 9 March 1948 to the Basalt Rock Company, which subsequently took delivery of and scrapped her.

== Honors and awards ==
- World War II Victory Medal
