= Alter =

Alter may refer to:

== Computing and technology ==
- ALTER, a historic COBOL command
- ALTER (SQL), an SQL command

== Music ==
- Alter (album), 2002 album by Floater
- Alter, a 2006 remix album by Swiss band Knut
- "Alter", a song from the 1994 album Glow, by Raven

== TV and media ==
- ALTER (streaming service) a channel dedicated to horror, run by Gunpowder & Sky
- Alter Channel, a Greek TV channel
- Alter, a sister magazine of Linus magazine

== Other uses ==
- Alters, the different personality states in dissociative identity disorder
- Alter (automobile)
- Alter (crater), a lunar crater
- Alter (name), people named Alter
- Short for alter ego
- Archbishop Alter High School

== See also ==
- Altar (disambiguation)
