= Design 1013 ship =

Steel-hulled cargo ship design approved for mass production in World War 1

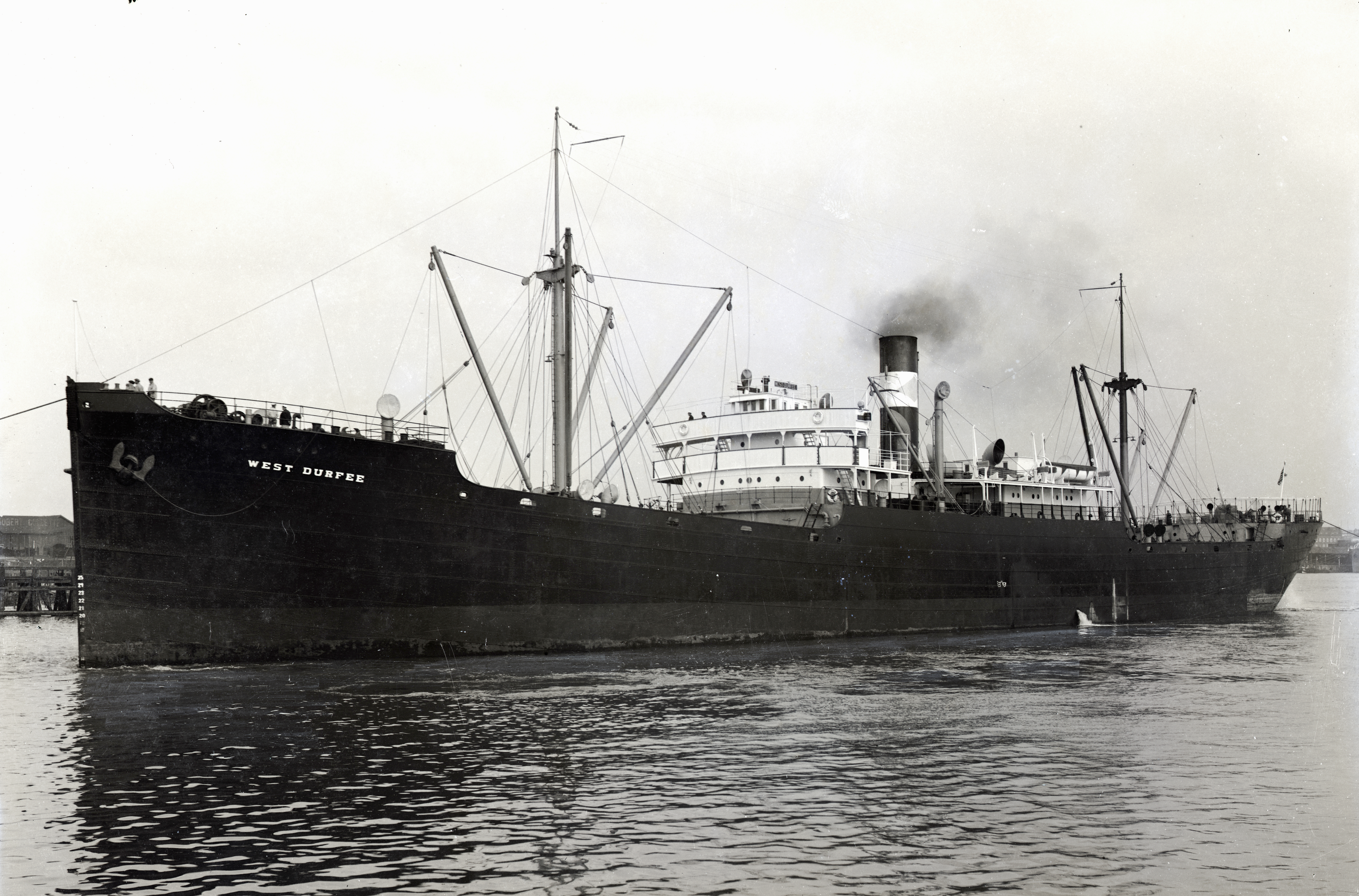
- West Durfee, a typical Design 1013 ship

Class overview
- Name: EFT Design 1013
- Builders: Skinner & Eddy (24); J. F. Duthie & Co. (12); Los Angeles S.B. & D.D. (30); Northwest Steel Co. (23); Columbia River S.B. (22)
- Built: 1918–20
- In service: 1918–68
- In commission: 1918–46
- Completed: 111

General characteristics
- Type: Cargo ship
- Tonnage: 8,800 dwt, 5,600 grt
- Displacement: 12,225
- Length: 423 ft 9 in (129.16 m)
- Beam: 54 ft (16 m)
- Draft: 24 ft 2 in (7.37 m)
- Depth of hold: 29 ft 9 in (9.07 m)
- Installed power: Curtis geared turbine or triple expansion steam
- Propulsion: Single screw propeller
- Speed: 11–12 knots
- Complement: WWI: 70-90; Merchant: about 30

The Design 1013 ship (full name Emergency Fleet Corporation Design 1013), also known as the Robert Dollar type, was a steel-hulled cargo ship design approved for mass production by the United States Shipping Board's Emergency Fleet Corporation (EFT) in World War I. Like many of the early designs approved by the EFT, the Design 1013 did not originate with the EFT itself but was based on an existing cargo ship design, in this case one developed by the Skinner & Eddy Corporation of Seattle, Washington.

Some of the vessels were oil-fired and others coal-fired. They were produced by a variety of shipyards on the west coast of the United States. Most of them were given names starting with the word West (or in some cases, Western), indicating their west coast origins.

A total of 111 of the type were completed—106 for the EFT and an additional five completed later for private contractors. All of them entered service between 1918 and 1920, with the majority probably being completed in 1919. About 37 of the completed ships were acquired by the U.S. Navy either during or shortly after the war for service as auxiliaries, but most of these were quickly decommissioned in 1919 after only a few months' service.

== Lend-Lease ==
As per the Lend-Lease Agreement, several ships were purchased by the USSR in 1942–1945, as the USSR needed ships for its merchant fleet during World War II and in the first years after the war. In total, the Soviet Union purchased 25 ships of design 1013. All purchased ships of that design were counted as Belorussia-class cargo ships by the Soviet Union and sometimes referred to as West-class cargo ships due to their manufacture on the West Coast of the US. All purchased ships were renamed.

== Bibliography ==
- McKellar, Norman L. (September–October 1962): "Steel Shipbuilding under the U.S. Shipping Board, 1917–1921 - Design 1013", The Belgian Shiplover, No. 89, September–October 1962, as reproduced at shipscribe.com.
