= List of ship launches in 1917 =

The list of ship launches in 1917 includes a chronological list of some ships launched in 1917.

Date	Ship	Class / type	Builder	Location	Country	Notes
6 January	Thordis	Cargo ship	Moore Dry Dock Company	Oakland, California	United States	For private owner.
11 January	Lancashire	Passenger ship	Harland & Wolff	Belfast	United Kingdom	For Bibby Steamship Co.
16 January	N-2	N-class submarine	Seattle Construction and Drydock Company	Seattle, Washington	United States	For United States Navy.
18 January	Tidewater	Collier	New York Shipbuilding	Camden, New Jersey	United States	For Darrow-Mann Company.
20 January	Unnamed	Cargo ship	Alameda Works Shipyard	Alameda, California	United States	For H. S. Bjoeness.
20 January	Regulus	Cargo ship	Alameda Works Shipyard	Alameda, California	United States	For private owner.
23 January	F14	F-class submarine	Odero	Sestri Ponente	Italy	For Italian Regia Marina (Royal Navy)
23 January	Flaminian	Cargo ship	W. Harkness & Sons Ltd.	Middlesbrough	United Kingdom	For Ellerman & Papyanni Lines.
24 January	Calypso	C-class cruiser	Hawthorn Leslie and Company	Hebburn	United Kingdom	For Royal Navy.
25 January	Mississippi	New Mexico-class battleship	Newport News Shipbuilding	Newport News, Virginia	United States	For United States Navy.
27 January	Hyūga	Ise-class battleship	Mitsubishi Heavy Industries	Nagasaki	Japan	For Imperial Japanese Navy.
3 February	Skilful	Destroyer	Harland & Wolff	Govan	United Kingdom	For Royal Navy.
10 February	Torrid	R-class destroyer	Swan Hunter & Wigham Richardson	Wallsend	United Kingdom	For Royal Navy.
21 February	N-3	N-class submarine	Seattle Construction and Drydock Company	Seattle, Washington	United States	For United States Navy.
24 February	Tristram	R-class destroyer	J. Samuel White	Cowes	United Kingdom	For Royal Navy.
3 March	Wiesbaden	Cöln-class cruiser	AG Vulcan	Stettin	Germany	For Imperial German Navy
4 March	F6	F-class submarine	Orlando	Livorno	Italy	For Italian Regia Marina (Royal Navy)
8 March	Minnekahda	Passenger ship	Harland & Wolff	Belfast	United Kingdom	For Atlantic Transport Co.
8 March	Thisbe	R-class destroyer	Hawthorn Leslie and Company	Hebburn	United Kingdom	For Royal Navy.
9 March	HMS Springbok	Destroyer	Harland & Wolff	Govan	United Kingdom	For Royal Navy.
10 March	Taurus	R-class destroyer	John I. Thornycroft & Company	Southampton	United Kingdom	For Royal Navy.
14 March	Golden Gate	Cargo ship	Seattle Construction and Drydock Company	Seattle, Washington	United States	For Knute Knutsen.
15 March	Hermione	Bellone-class submarine	Arsenal de Toulon	Toulon	France	For French Navy
19 March	F16	F-class submarine	Odero	Sestri Ponente	Italy	For Italian Regia Marina (Royal Navy)
20 March	Farnworth	Cargo ship	Richardson, Duck & Co. Ltd.	Thornaby-on-Tees	United Kingdom	For R. S. Dalgleish Ltd.
24 March	Ceres	C-class cruiser	John Brown & Company	Clydebank	United Kingdom	For Royal Navy.
6 February	Belle Isle	Screw steamer	Forges et Chantiers de la Méditerranée	Le Havre	France	For Cie Francaise de Nav a Vapeur Chargeurs Reunis
24 March	Valentine	V-class destroyer	Cammell Laird	Birkenhead	United Kingdom	For Royal Navy.
31 March	Vesterlide	Cargo ship	Northwest Steel	Portland, Oregon	United States	
5 April	Orca	Passenger ship	Harland & Wolff	Belfast	United Kingdom	For Pacific Steam Navigation Company.
10 April	Narcíso Monturiol	A-class submarine	FIAT-San Giorgio	La Spezia	Italy	For Spanish Navy, built with Italian designation F22.
11 April	Key West	Cargo ship	Seattle Construction and Drydock Company	Seattle, Washington	United States	For Knute Knutsen.
13 April	New Mexico	New Mexico-class battleship	New York Naval Shipyard	Brooklyn, New York	United States	For United States Navy.
19 April	Regina	Passenger ship	Harland & Wolff	Govan	United Kingdom	For Dominion Line.
20 April	Tetrarch	Destroyer	Harland & Wolff	Govan	United Kingdom	For Royal Navy.
21 April	Melita	Passenger ship	Harland & Wolff	Belfast	United Kingdom	For Canadian Pacific Railway.
21 April	Teazer	R-class destroyer	John I. Thornycroft & Company	Southampton	United Kingdom	For Royal Navy.
23 April	L-8	L-class submarine	Portsmouth Navy Yard	Portsmouth, New Hampshire	United States	For United States Navy.
25 April	Dresden	Cöln-class cruiser	Blohm + Voss	Hamburg	Germany	For Imperial German Navy.
8 May	Valorous	V-class destroyer	William Denny and Brothers	Dumbarton	United Kingdom	For Royal Navy.
15 May	Curacoa	C-class cruiser	Pembroke Dockyard	Pembroke	United Kingdom	For Royal Navy.
15 May	F18	F-class submarine	Odero	Sestri Ponente	Italy	For Italian Regia Marina (Royal Navy)
17 May	Glenavy	Cargo ship	Harland & Wolff	Belfast	United Kingdom	For Glen Line.
19 May	Gaillardia	Aubretia-class sloop	Blyth Shipbuilding & Dry Docks Co. Ltd	Blyth	United Kingdom	For Royal Navy.
20 May	F13	F-class submarine	Orlando	Livorno	Italy	For Italian Regia Marina (Royal Navy)
21 May	Stavangerfjord	Passenger ship	Cammell Laird	Birkenhead	United Kingdom	For Den Norske Amerikalinje.
21 May	Tenacious	Destroyer	Harland & Wolff	Govan	United Kingdom	For Royal Navy.
21 May	Wallace	W-class Destroyer	J. Samuel White	Cowes	United Kingdom	For Royal Navy.
22 May	Valhalla	V-class destroyer	Cammell Laird	Birkenhead	United Kingdom	For Royal Navy.
23 May	Aurigny	Screw steamer	Forges et Chantiers de la Méditerranée	La Seyne	France	For: Cie. Française de Navigation à Vapeur Chargeurs Réunis
25 May	Valkyrie	V-class destroyer	William Denny and Brothers	Dumbarton	United Kingdom	For Royal Navy.
27 May	F15	F-class submarine	Orlando	Livorno	Italy	For Italian Regia Marina (Royal Navy)
29 May	Snug Harbor	Cargo ship	Staten Island Shipbuilding Company	Port Richmond, New York	United States	Requisitioned by United States Shipping Board.
3 June	F17	F-class submarine	Orlando	Livorno	Italy	For Italian Regia Marina (Royal Navy)
6 June	Storviken	Cargo ship	Seattle Construction and Drydock Company	Seattle, Washington	United States	For Haakon Wallen Co.
7 June	P62	Patrol boat	Harland & Wolff	Govan	United Kingdom	For Royal Navy.
14 June	Vanoc	V-class destroyer	John Brown & Company	Clydebank	United Kingdom	For Royal Navy.
16 June	A-3	A-class submarine	FIAT-San Giorgio	La Spezia	Italy	For Spanish Navy, built with Italian designation F24.
17 June	Cosme García	A-class submarine	FIAT-San Giorgio	La Spezia	Italy	For Spanish Navy, built with Italian designation F23.
21 June	War Shamrock	Cargo ship	Harland & Wolff	Belfast	United Kingdom	For British Shipping Controller.
23 June	Priwall	Barque	Blohm & Voss	Hamburg	Germany	For F. Laeisz.
30 June	Idaho	New Mexico-class battleship	Camden, New Jersey	New York Shipbuilding	United States	For United States Navy.
30 June	Württemberg	Bayern-class battleship	AG Vulcan	Hamburg	Germany	For Imperial German Navy.
5 July	Curlew	C-class cruiser	Vickers Limited	Barrow in Furness	United Kingdom	For .Royal Navy
6 July	Coventry	C-class cruiser	Swan Hunter & Wigham Richardson	Wallsend	United Kingdom	For Royal Navy.
7 July	Shakespeare	Thornycroft type flotilla leader	John I. Thornycroft & Company	Southampton	United Kingdom	For Royal Navy.
2 August	War Viceroy	Cargo ship	Northwest Steel	Portland, Oregon	United States	For United States Shipping Board.
15 August	Siboney	Cargo ship	William Cramp & Sons	Philadelphia, Pennsylvania	United States	Requisitioned by United States Shipping Board.
16 August	War Clover	Cargo ship	Harland & Wolff	Belfast	United Kingdom	For British Shipping Controller.
18 August	Vanquisher	V-class destroyer	John Brown & Company	Clydebank	United Kingdom	For Royal Navy.
21 August	Verdun	V-class destroyer	R. & W. Hawthorn, Leslie & Co. Ltd.	Newcastle upon Tyne	United Kingdom	For Royal Navy.
23 August	Chestnut Hil	Tanker	Pusey & Jones	Gloucester City, New Jersey	United States	Requisitioned by United States Shipping Board.
25 August	Coronado	Cargo ship	Moore Dry Dock Company	Oakland, California	United States	For Requisitioned by United States Shipping Board.
30 August	J. E. O'Neil	Tanker	Bethlehem Alameda	Alameda, California	United States	Requisitioned by United States Shipping Board.
30 August	Rimouski	Cargo ship	Harland & Wolff	Belfast	United Kingdom	For Dominion Line.
1 September	Vega	V-class destroyer	William Doxford & Sons	Sunderland	United Kingdom	For Royal Navy.
2 September	West Point	Cargo ship	J. F. Duthie & Company	Seattle, Washington	United States	For private owner.
4 September	Vectis	V-class destroyer	J. Samuel White	Cowes	United Kingdom	For Royal Navy.
14 September	Landaas	Cargo ship	Northwest Steel	Portland, Oregon	United States	For private owner.
15 September	Drottning Victoria	Sverige-class coastal defence ship	Götaverken	Gothenburg	Sweden	For Royal Swedish Navy.
15 September	Gustav V	Sverige-class coastal defence ship	Kockums Mekaniska Verkstad	Malmö	Sweden	For Royal Swedish Navy.
15 September	War Trefoil	Cargo ship	Harland & Wolff	Belfast	United Kingdom	For British Shipping Controller.
29 September	Sudbury	Cargo ship	Chester Shipbuilding Company	Chester, Pennsylvania	United States	Requisitioned by United States Shipping Board.
6 October	Elinor	Cargo ship	Baltimore Dry Dock and Shipbuilding Company	Baltimore, Maryland	United States	Requisitioned by United States Shipping Board.
13 October	Santa Ana	Transport ship	William Cramp & Sons	Philadelphia, Pennsylvania	United States	Requisitioned by United States Shipping Board.
15 October	Ro-11	Kaichū I-type submarine	Kure Naval Arsenal	Kure	Japan	For Imperial Japanese Navy.
16 October	War Hostage	A0 Tanker	Harland & Wolff	Belfast	United Kingdom	For British Shipping Controller.
17 October	Minnedosa	Passenger ship	Harland & Wolff	Govan	United Kingdom	For Canadian Pacific Railway.
18 October	Scott	Admiralty type flotilla leader	Cammell Laird	Birkenhead	United Kingdom	For Royal Navy.
20 October	Mahratta	Cargo ship	Robert Duncan & Co.	Port Glasgow	United Kingdom	For T. & J. Brocklebank Ltd.
20 October	Muscatine	Refrigerated cargo ship	Standard Shipbuilding Company	Shooters Island, New York	United States	Requisitioned by the United States Shipping Board.
26 October	Sylvan Arrow	Tanker	New York Shipbuilding	Camden, New Jersey	United States	Requisitioned by the United States Shipping Board.
27 October	K. I. Luckenbach	Cargo ship	Bethlehem Fore River	Quincy, Massachusetts	United States	Requisitioned by the United States Shipping Board.
27 October	A. C. Bedford	Tanker	Bethlehem Alameda	Alameda, California	United States	Requisitioned by the United States Shipping Board.
27 October	Lake Traverse	Cargo ship	McDougall-Duluth Shipbuilding	Duluth, Minnesota	United States	Requisitioned by the United States Shipping Board.
30 October	Yosemite	Cargo ship	Moore Dry Dock Company	Oakland, California	United States	Requisitioned by the United States Shipping Board.
31 October	Wellpark	Cargo ship	Greenock & Grangemouth Dockyard Company	Grangemouth	United Kingdom	For Denholm Line Steamers Ltd.
1 November	War Flame	Cargo ship	Skinner & Eddy	Seattle, Washington	United States	For United States Shipping Board.
3 November	Margit	Cargo ship	Albina Engine & Machine Works	Portland, Oregon	United States	Requisitioned by the United States Shipping Board.
4 November	Halgren	Cargo ship	Northwest Steel	Portland, Oregon	United States	Requisitioned by the United States Shipping Board.
6 November	Hallbjorg	Cargo ship	J. F. Duthie & Company	Seattle, Washington	United States	Requisitioned by the United States Shipping Board.
10 November	Luella	Refrigerated cargo ship	Baltimore Dry Dock and Shipbuilding Company	Baltimore, Maryland	United States	Requisitioned by the United States Shipping Board.
10 November	John M. Connelly	Tanker	Pusey & Jones	Gloucester City, New Jersey	United States	Requisitioned by the United States Shipping Board.
10 November	Redondo	Cargo ship	Bethlehem Alameda	Alameda, California	United States	Requisitioned by the United States Shipping Board.
11 November	Little	Wickes-class destroyer	Fore River Shipyard	Quincy, Massachusetts	United States	For United States Navy.
11 November	Herbert. L. Pratt	Tanker	Bethlehem Alameda	Alameda, California	United States	Requisitioned by the United States Shipping Board.
15 November	War Cobra	B-type cargo ship	Harland & Wolff	Belfast	United Kingdom	For British Shipping Controller.
17 November	Magdeburg	Cöln-class cruiser	Howaldtswerke	Kiel	Germany	For Imperial German Navy.
17 November	Munaires	Cargo ship	Newport News Shipbuilding	Newport News, Virginia	United States	Requisitioned by the United States Shipping Board.
17 November	Overbrook	Tanker	Chester Shipbuilding Company	Chester, Pennsylvania	United States	Requisitioned by the United States Shipping Board.
19 November	War Sirdar	Cargo ship	Columbia River Shipbuilding	Portland, Oregon	United States	Requisitioned by the United States Shipping Board.
21 November	Sacramento	Cargo ship	Seattle Construction and Drydock Company	Seattle, Washington	United States	Requisitioned by the United States Shipping Board.
24 November	Seattle	Cargo ship	Skinner & Eddy	Seattle, Washington	United States	For United States Shipping Board.
24 November	Westerly	Cargo ship	Ames Shipbuilding and Dry Dock Company	Seattle, Washington	United States	Requisitioned by the United States Shipping Board.
24 November	J. C. Donnell	Tanker	Newport News Shipbuilding	Newport News, Virginia	United States	Requisitioned by the United States Shipping Board.
24 November	Lake Lillian	Cargo ship	American Shipbuilding Company	Cleveland, Ohio	United States	Requisitioned by the United States Shipping Board.
24 November	Lake Duane	Cargo Ship	American Shipbuilding Company	Detroit, Michigan	United States	Requisitioned by the United States Shipping Board.
25 November	War Brigade	Cargo ship	Ames Shipbuilding and Dry Dock Company	Seattle, Washington	United States	For United States Shipping Board.
29 November	Erling	Cargo ship	Albina Engine & Machine Works	Portland, Oregon	United States	Requisitioned by the United States Shipping Board.
1 December	Ro-12	Kaichū I-type submarine	Kure Naval Arsenal	Kure	Japan	For Imperial Japanese Navy
1 December	Abrigada	Cargo ship	Grays Harbor Motorship Corporation	Grays Harbor, Washington	United States	For United States Shipping Board.
5 December	War Ally	Cargo ship	Northwest Steel	Portland, Oregon	United States	Requisitioned by the United States Shipping Board.
8 December	Westfield	Cargo ship	J. F. Duthie & Company	Seattle, Washington	United States	Requisitioned by the United States Shipping Board.
8 December	Fairmont	Collier	New York Shipbuilding	Camden, New Jersey	United States	Requisitioned by the United States Shipping Board.
9 December	Yellowstone	Cargo ship	Moore Dry Dock Company	Oakland, California	United States	Requisitioned by the United States Shipping Board.
12 December	Dixmude	Auxiliary schooner	Puget Sound Bridge & Dredging Company	Seattle, Washington	United States	For the French government.
12 December	Lake Elizabeth	Cargo ship	Great Lakes Engineering Works	Ecorse, Michigan	United States	Requisitioned by the United States Shipping Board.
12 December	Lake St. Clair	Cargo ship	Great Lakes Engineering Works	Ecorse, Michigan	United States	Requisitioned by the United States Shipping Board.
14 December	Kimberly	Wickes-class destroyer	Fore River Shipyard	Quincy, Massachusetts	United States	For United States Navy.
15 December	Accomac	Cargo ship	Los Angeles Shipbuilding and Dry Dock Company	San Pedro, California	United States	For United States Shipping Board.
15 December	Fairfax	Wickes-class destroyer	Mare Island Navy Yard	Vallejo, California	United States	For United States Navy.
15 December	Lake Otisco	Cargo ship	American Shipbuilding Company	Cleveland, Ohio	United States	Requisitioned by the United States Shipping Board.
15 December	Lake Tulare	Cargo ship	American Shipbuilding Company	Superior, Wisconsin	United States	Requisitioned by the United States Shipping Board.
15 December	North Bend	Cargo ship	Kruse & Banks Shipbuilding Company	North Bend, Oregon	United States	For United States Shipping Board.
15 December	Piqua	Cargo ship	Pusey & Jones	Wilmington, Delaware	United States	Requisitioned by the United States Shipping Board.
15 December	Trontolite	Tanker	Skinner & Eddy	Seattle, Washington	United States	Requisitioned by the United States Shipping Board.
15 December	Walter A. Luckenbach	Cargo ship	Seattle Construction and Drydock Company	Seattle, Washington	United States	Requisitioned by the United States Shipping Board.
16 December	Sigourney	Wickes-class destroyer	Fore River Shipyard	Quincy, Massachusetts	United States	For United States Navy.
17 December	Rathburne	Wickes-class destroyer	William Cramp & Sons	Philadelphia, Pennsylvania	United States	For United States Navy.
17 December	S. M. Spaulding	Tanker	Bethlehem Alameda	Alameda, California	United States	requisitioned by the United States Shipping Board.
18 December	Vedic	Passenger ship	Harland & Wolff	Belfast	United Kingdom	For White Star Line.
19 December	Saetia	Cargo ship	Bethlehem Wilmington	Wilmington, Delaware	United States	Requisitioned by the United States Shipping Board.
20 December	Lake Como	Cargo ship	American Shipbuilding Company	Lorain, Ohio	United States	Requisitioned by the United States Shipping Board.
20 December	Lake St. Regis	Cargo ship	Great Lakes Engineering Works	Detroit, Michigan	United States	Requisitioned by the United States Shipping Board.
22 December	Absaroka	Cargo ship	Skinner & Eddy	Seattle, Washington	United States	For United States Shipping Board.
22 December	Gwin	Caldwell-class destroyer	Seattle Construction and Drydock Company	Seattle, Washington	United States	For United States Navy.
22 December	Ice King	Refrigerated cargo ship	Standard Shipbuilding Company	Shooters Island, New York	United States	Requisitioned by the United States Shipping Board.
22 December	War Agate	Cargo ship	Columbia River Shipbuilding	Portland, Oregon	United States	For United States Shipping Board.
22 December	Broad Arrow	Tanker	New York Shipbuilding	Camden, New Jersey	United States	Requisitioned by the United States Shipping Board.
27 December	Freeman	Collier	New York Shipbuilding	Camden, New Jersey	United States	Requisitioned by the United States Shipping Board.
28 December	Vancouver	V-class destroyer	William Beardmore and Company	Dalmuir	United Kingdom	For Royal Navy.
28 December	Lake Sunapee	Cargo ship	Toledo Shipbuilding Company	Toledo, Ohio	United States	Requisitioned by the United States Shipping Board.
29 December	Lake Conway	Cargo ship	American Shipbuilding Company	Detroit, Michigan	United States	Requisitioned by the United States Shipping Board.
29 December	War Expert	A0 tanker	Harland & Wolff	Belfast	United Kingdom	For British Shipping Controller.
29 December	War Python	B-type cargo ship	Harland & Wolff	Belfast	United Kingdom	For British Shipping Controller.
30 December	W. M. Irish	Tanker	Bethlehem Alameda	Alameda, California	United States	Requisitioned by the United States Shipping Board.
2nd Quarter	Unnamed	Pontoon	I. J. Abdela & Mitchell Ltd.	Queensferry	United Kingdom	For private owner.
2nd Quarter	Unnamed	Pontoon	I. J. Abdela & Mitchell Ltd.	Queensferry	United Kingdom	For private owner.
4th Quarter	James Evans	Naval trawler	I. J. Abdela & Mitchell Ltd.	Queensferry	United Kingdom	For Royal Navy.
Unknown date	Buffs	Collier	S. P. Austin & Sons Ltd.	Sunderland	United Kingdom	For Wm. Cory & Sons Ltd.
Unknown date	Camswan	Cargo ship	Blyth Shipbuilding & Dry Docks Co. Ltd	Blyth	United Kingdom	For Osbourne Steamship Co. Ltd.
Unknown date	De Lauwers	Schooner	Gebroeders van Diepen	Waterhuizen	Netherlands	For private owner.
Unknown date	Elwick	Cargo ship	Blyth Shipbuilding & Dry Docks Co. Ltd	Blyth	United Kingdom	For Sharp Steamship Co. Ltd.
Unknown date	Holden Evans	tanker	Baltimore Shipbuilding Corporation	Baltimore, Maryland	United States	For unknown owner.
Unknown date	Maine	Cargo ship	Texas Steamship Company	Bath, Maine	United States	For United States Shipping Board.
Unknown date	Selina Salmon	Steam drifter	Beeching Brothers Ltd.	Great Yarmouth	United Kingdom	For John Salmon.
Unknown date	Tilburg	Cargo ship	L Smit & Zoon	Kinderdijk	Netherlands	For NV Nederlandsche Scheepvaart Maatschappij Transatlanta.
Unknown date	West Haven	Cargo ship	Skinner & Eddy	Seattle, Washington	United States	For United States Shipping Board.
