= SS War Baron =

Steam cargo ship built in 1916-1917

Coordinates: 50°23′23.16″N 5°23′41.04″W

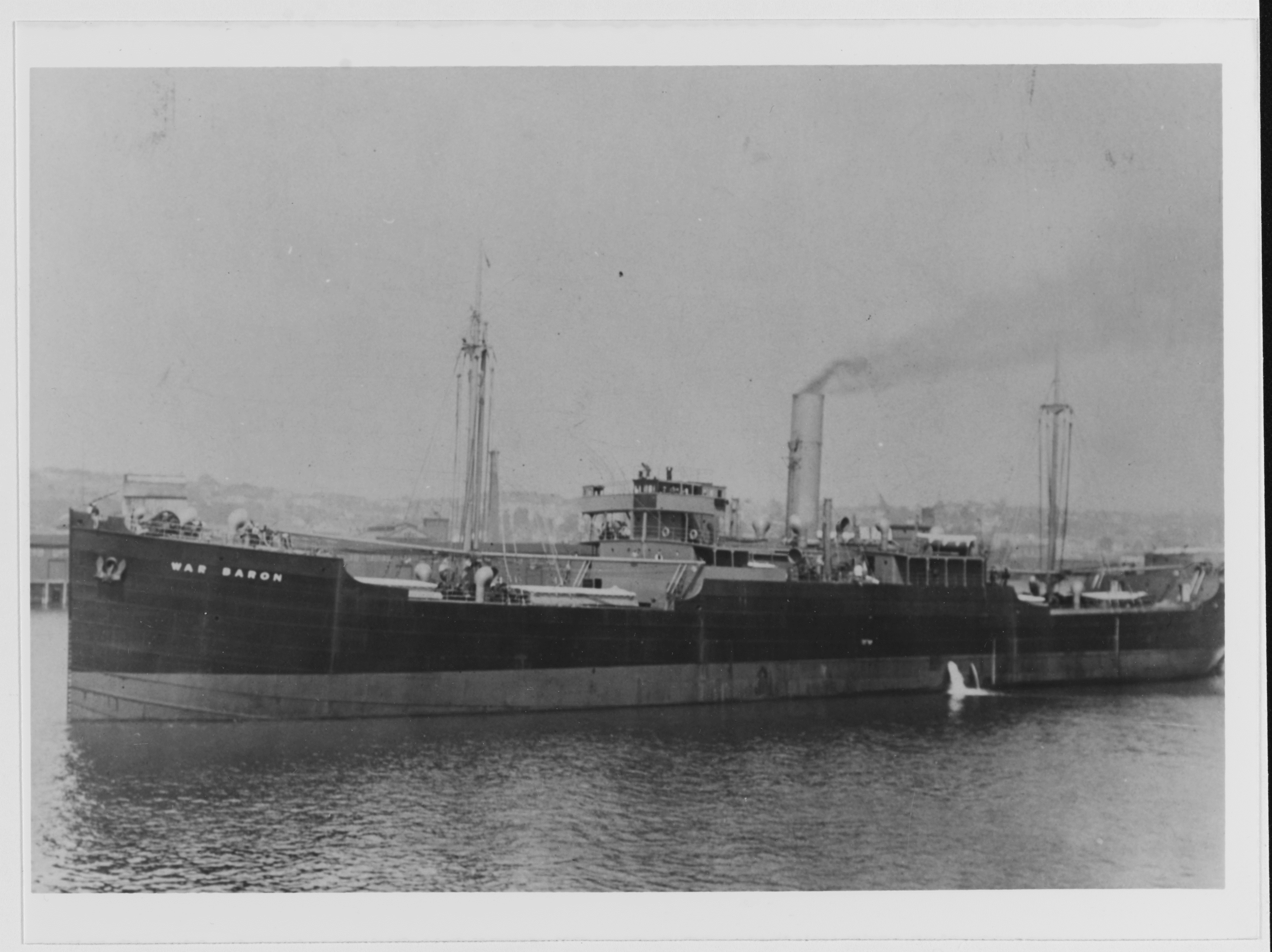
- War Baron

History

United Kingdom
- Name: 1917: Vesterlide; 1917: War Baron
- Owner: Shipping Controller
- Operator: Cunard Line
- Port of registry: London
- Ordered: 10 April 1916
- Builder: Northwest Steel Co., Portland
- Cost: US$ 950,000
- Yard number: 1
- Laid down: 27 July 1916
- Launched: 31 March 1917
- Sponsored by: Marion Virginia Bowles
- Christened: Vesterlide
- Commissioned: 14 July 1917
- Maiden voyage: 3 August 1917
- Identification: UK official number 140402; code letters JQHF
- Fate: Sunk, 5 January 1918

General characteristics
- Type: cargo ship
- Tonnage: 6,240 GRT, 4,677 NRT
- Length: 410.0 ft (125.0 m)
- Beam: 54.0 ft (16.5 m)
- Draught: 24 ft 0 in (7.32 m) (loaded)
- Depth: 27.0 ft (8.2 m)
- Decks: 2
- Installed power: 508 NHP
- Propulsion: General Electric steam turbine, double reduction geared to one screw
- Speed: 10 1/2 knots (19 km/h; 12 mph)

War Baron was a steam cargo ship built in 1916–17 by Northwest Steel Company of Portland for Lauritz Kloster of Stavanger. The ship was launched as Vesterlide but was renamed early in 1917 after the UK Shipping Controller bought her from their Norwegian owners. She was torpedoed and sunk in January 1918 with a loss of two men.

== Design and building ==
In late 1915 Lauritz Kloster of Stavanger, who at the time was operating four small vessels in the Baltic, decided to expand their operations into trans-Atlantic trade. In February 1916 a contract was prepared between the Norwegian firm, A/S Klosters Rederi, on one side and Northwest Steel Co. and Willamette Iron & Steel Works on the other, to build two ships of about 8,800 tons deadweight, and signed in early April of the same year. Vesterlide was laid down on 27 July 1916 at the Northwest Steel newly built shipyard on the south side of Portland, and launched on 31 March 1917 (yard number 1), with Miss Marion Virginia Bowles, daughter of J. R. Bowles, the president of Northwest Steel Co., being the sponsor. As the ship was the first steel freighter to be built in Portland, the launching ceremony was open to the public, and was attended by a large number of common folk as well as local dignitaries. As Vesterlide was launched, two hawsers holding her bow failed and the freighter lunged into water travelling about half a mile across the Willamette River and smashing into sternwheeler Ruth hitting her amidships and opening a wide hole in her. Three people on board the wheeler were injured as they jumped over board. Ruth sank after about 45 minutes, but was later raised, repaired and returned to service.

The ship was a two-deck, three-island steamer with machinery amidships, and was equipped with all modern machinery for quick loading and unloading of cargo from four main and one small hatches. She also had electric lights along her decks.

While the ships were still being built, A/S Klosters Rederi decided to divest two of them due to delays in delivery and uncertainties related to ongoing World War I. As Britain was trying to replenish huge war losses from its merchant fleet, Cunard Line approached the Norwegians. On 26 February 1917 Vesterlide and her sister ship Vesterlen, also being built by Northwest Steel, were sold for about US$ 4,300,000. The Shipping Controller was to own the ships, and Cunard Line would manage them. On 10 April 1917 Vesterlide was officially renamed War Baron.

Initially, the cargo ship was scheduled to leave for her sea trials on 5 July but due to the need to erect a gun platform her departure was delayed until 9 July, when she left the shipyard for Tacoma. After successful completion of sea trials War Baron returned to Tacoma to load cargo and was handed over to the Cunard Line officials on 14 July.

The ship's registered length was 410.0 feet (125.0 m), her beam was 54.0 feet (16.5 m), and her depth was 27.0 feet (8.2 m). War Baron was originally assessed at 6,240 GRT and 4,677 NRT. She had a steel hull with double bottom throughout with exception of her machine compartment, and a single Curtis turbine rated at 508 NHP, double-reduction geared to a single screw propeller that gave her a speed of up to 10 1/2 knots (19 km/h; 12 mph). The steam for the engine was supplied by three single-ended Scotch marine boilers fitted for both coal and oil fuel.

== Operational history ==
While still under construction the ship was inspected by the 13th Naval District on 29 June 1917 and assigned the Navy ID # 1641. She was not taken over for U.S. Navy service and remained under British control until the end of her career. Following delivery to Cunard Line the ship loaded cargo of lumber and general merchandise at various ports of the Pacific Northwest and left Port Townsend on 3 August 1917 for Esquimalt. There she was to receive her sealed orders, which her Captain had to open when the ship was past Cape Flattery. She eventually arrived in England at the end of October 1917 via San Pedro and the Panama Canal. Upon arrival in England War Baron was taken over by the Shipping Controller to transport ammunition and provisions, and she was defensively armed.

The ship remained in Southampton until early January 1918. On 5 January 1918 she was in passage from Southampton to Barry for bunkering. At about 16:45 local time while about 8 nautical miles (15 km) northeast of Godrevy Lighthouse, she was struck amidships by a torpedo launched by German submarine U-55. An explosion made a huge hole in her hull, and she quickly took on water. Lifeboats were launched and all but two seamen aboard were able to abandon ship either in lifeboats or by jumping overboard. As the attack took place so close to shore, the whole incident was witnessed, and wireless distress signal was immediately sent. Several Navy ships arrived a couple of hours later and all survivors were soon safely landed ashore.
