= Western Spirit =

Western Spirit may refer to:

- Western Spirit FC, an Australian football (soccer) club
- USS Western Spirit (ID-3164), a United States Navy cargo ship in commission from 1918 to 1919
- Western Spirit: Scottsdale’s Museum of the West
- [Western Spirit: Bicycle Tour Company in Moab, Utah]]
