= Ro-11 =

Ro-11 may refer to:

- Japanese submarine Ro-11, an Imperial Japanese Navy submarine in commission from 1919 to 1932
- Ro-11-class submarine, an alternative name for the Kaichū I subclass of the Japanese Kaichū type submarine
