= USS Chestnut Hill =

History

United States
- Name: Desdemona (1918); Chestnut Hill (1918—1927); Caliche (1927—1943); Donbass (1943—1944) Lend Lease to Soviet Union; Caliche (1944—1947)
- Builder: Pennsylvania Shipbuilding Company
- Yard number: 1
- Launched: 23 August 1917
- Acquired: 14 March 1918
- Commissioned: 14 March 1918
- Decommissioned: 3 September 1919
- Identification: U.S. official number 215976, Signal 1919 LJQG
- Fate: Sunk as a target 1947

General characteristics
- Tonnage: 4,915 GRT; 2,970 NRT
- Displacement: 10,150 tons
- Length: 380 ft (120 m) (LOA); 364.9 ft (111.2 m) (LBP)
- Beam: 50 ft 9 in (15.47 m)
- Draft: 24 ft 5 in (7.44 m)
- Depth: 29.5 ft (9.0 m)
- Speed: 11 kn (20 km/h; 13 mph)
- Complement: 71
- Armament: 1 × 5-inch gun; 1 × 6-pounder cannon

USS Chestnut Hill (ID-2526) was a commercial tanker that served briefly with the United States Navy during World War I. The ship was ordered as Desdemona for British service but requisitioned by the United States Shipping Board (USSB) for U.S. service and renamed Chestnut Hill before completion. After commissioning and assignment to the Naval Overseas Transportation Service (NOTS) the ship served as an escort and fueling ship for fleets of U.S. submarine chasers crossing the Atlantic.

After decommissioning and return to the USSB the ship operated as a commercial tanker under that organization's ownership until sold in 1927, converted to diesel power and renamed Caliche. Ownership changed several times until World War II when the ship was delivered to the War Shipping Administration (WSA) for the duration. From 19 May 1943 to 31 March 1944 the ship was operated as Donbass by the Soviet Union on Lend Lease. After return, resumption of the name Calice and brief operation the ship was turned over to the Navy and later sunk as a bombing target.

== Construction ==
The ship, originally Desdemona, yard number 1, was one of five tankers under construction at Pennsylvania Shipbuilding Company, Gloucester City, New Jersey (Renamed Pusey and Jones Gloucester City after hull number 2) on order of C.T. Bowring & Co Ltd. acting for the British Shipping Controller. The USSB requisitioned the ship before completion, renaming the vessel Chestnut Hill, U.S. official number 215976, with launching on 23 August 1917 and completion in February 1918.

== Navy commission and operation ==
The United States Navy acquired the ship from the USSB, which retained ownership, and commissioned it on 14 March 1918 with assignment it to the Naval Overseas Transportation Service (NOTS) for operation. Chestnut Hill served as an escort and fuel ship in the Azores from 22 March – 15 June 1918 for two convoys of submarine chasers. The tanker operated in coastwise runs until 26 September when assigned to escort more submarine chasers to the Azores by way of Bermuda.

On 8 April 1918 Chestnut Hill, the submarine chaser tender Leonidas and the armed yacht Yacona departed Bermuda escorting four Army and one French tug and seventeen submarine chasers bound for the Azores. On 9 October 1918 Sub Chaser USS SC-219 sank in the Mid-Atlantic Ocean between Bermuda and the Azores due to an explosion and fire while refueling alongside Chestnut Hill with four killed and eight wounded. Chief Gunner's Mate Oscar Schmidt Jr. of Chestnut Hill rescued one man whose legs were partially blown off and attempted to rescue another in the flames. Schmidt was awarded the Medal of Honor for his actions.

Chestnut Hill left Bermuda 1 November to load oil in Texas for delivery to east coast ports. On 17 December the ship escorted submarine chasers from the Azores to San Domingo, Guantanamo, and Haiti. After repairing and loading oil at Gulf ports Chestnut Hill sailed 28 February 1919 for Gibraltar, where she had an overhaul until June. Chestnut Hill assembled a group of submarine chasers for the homeward passage from European ports, and on 28 July cleared Lisbon to escort the ships to New York. She was decommissioned at Philadelphia 3 September 1919, and returned to the USSB the following day.

== Commercial operation ==
Chestnut Hill remained registered under ownership of the USSB until sold for $57,000 in 1927 to the Anglo-Chilean Consolidated Nitrate Corporation of New York conditional on converting the vessel to diesel propulsion. The new engine was an 1,800 horsepower, six cylinder McIntosh & Seymour diesel. After conversion the ship was to engage in transporting fuel from California to the company's Tocopilla, Chile facilities. The tanker's capacity is noted as being 51,516 barrels in main tanks, 5,922 barrels in summer tanks and 48,170 cubic feet for dry cargo. The ship was renamed Caliche. (Note: Caliche is a mineral found in large deposits in Chile's Atacama Desert.)

Ownership changed in 1931 to the Motorship Caliche Corporation and in 1936 to the American Petroleum Transport Corporation. On 4 February 1942 Caliche was delivered to the War Shipping Administration (WSA) by American Petroleum Transport at Jacksonville, Florida for wartime operation under an Army Transportation Corps charter agreement by National Bulk Carriers. On 19 May 1943 the ship was purchased from American Petroleum Transport in Los Angeles to be turned over as Lend Lease to the Soviet Union. Renamed Donbass the ship was operated by the Soviets until returned 31 March 1944 at San Francisco to be operated by Pacific Tankers, Inc. under a WSA general charter agreement. On 30 October 1944 the ship was turned over to the Navy under a bareboat agreement and sunk as a bombing target, most references have 1947 with the Maritime Administration data card indicating perhaps 1948.
