= SS West Compo =

Steam cargo ship built 1918 by Northwest Steel Company

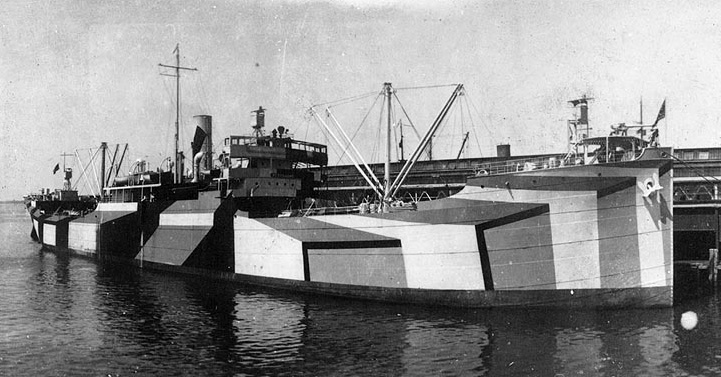
- West Compo had design and measurements similar to West Shore, a sister ship from the same shipyard seen here c. 1918.

History

United States
- Name: West Compo
- Namesake: Compo
- Owner: USSB
- Ordered: 27 December 1917
- Builder: Northwest Steel Co., Portland
- Yard number: 20
- Laid down: 27 August 1918
- Launched: 27 November 1918
- Sponsored by: Miss Nellie M. Washburn
- Commissioned: 31 January 1919
- Maiden voyage: 9 February 1919
- Home port: Portland
- Identification: US Official Number 217524; Call sign LPRQ
- Fate: Scrapped, 1936

History

United States
- Name: USS West Compo
- Operator: U.S. Navy (1919)
- Acquired: 3 February 1919
- Commissioned: 3 February 1919
- Decommissioned: 22 May 1919
- Fate: Returned to owners 22 May 1919

General characteristics
- Type: Design 1013 ship
- Tonnage: 5,700 GRT; 3,517 NRT; 8,635 DWT
- Displacement: 12,185 tons (normal)
- Length: 409.8 ft (124.9 m)
- Beam: 54.2 ft (16.5 m)
- Draft: 24 ft 1/2 in (7.328 m) (loaded)
- Depth: 27.2 ft (8.3 m)
- Installed power: 583 Nhp, 2,500 shp
- Propulsion: General Electric Co. steam turbine, double reduction geared to one screw
- Speed: 11 1/2 knots (13.2 mph; 21.3 km/h)
- Complement: 62

West Compo was a steam cargo ship built in 1918–1919 by Northwest Steel Company of Portland for the United States Shipping Board as part of the wartime shipbuilding program of the Emergency Fleet Corporation (EFC) to restore the nation's Merchant Marine. The vessel was commissioned into the Naval Overseas Transportation Service (NOTS) of the United States Navy in January 1919 and after only one overseas trip was decommissioned four months later and returned to the USSB. Afterwards the vessel was largely employed on the Atlantic Coast of the United States to France route until mid-1921 when she was laid up and eventually broken up for scrap in 1936.

== Design and construction ==
After the United States entry into World War I, a large shipbuilding program was undertaken to restore and enhance shipping capabilities both of the United States and their Allies. As part of this program, EFC placed orders with nation's shipyards for a large number of vessels of standard designs. Design 1013 cargo ship was a standard cargo freighter of approximately 8,800 tons deadweight designed by Skinner & Eddy Corp. and adopted by USSB.

West Compo was part of the order for 8 vessels placed by USSB with Northwest Steel Co. on 27 December 1917 and was laid down on 27 August 1918 at the shipbuilder's yard and launched on 27 November 1919 (yard number 20), with Miss Nellie M. Washburn being the sponsor. Similar to many other vessels ordered by the Shipping Board during these years and built by the West Coast shipyards, she was given a name that began with the word West to reflect their West Coast origin.

The ship was shelter-deck type, had two main decks and had five main holds which allowed for the carriage of variety of goods and merchandise. The vessel also possessed all the modern machinery for quick loading and unloading of cargo from five large hatches, including ten winches and a large number of derricks. She was also equipped with wireless apparatus, had submarine signal system installed and had electrical lights installed along the decks.

As built, the ship was 409.8 feet (124.9 m) long (between perpendiculars) and 54.2 feet (16.5 m) abeam, a depth of 27.2 feet (8.3 m). West Compo was originally assessed at 5,700 GRT and 3,517 NRT and had deadweight of approximately 8,635. The vessel had a steel hull with double bottom throughout with exception of her machine compartment, and a single turbine rated at 2,500 shp, double-reduction geared to a single screw propeller that moved the ship at up to 11 1/2 knots (13.2 mph; 21.3 km/h). The steam for the engine was supplied by three single-ended Scotch marine boilers fitted for both coal and oil fuel.

The sea trials were held in the Columbia River on 29 and 30 January 1919 with the ship performing satisfactorily. Following their successful completion, West Compo was handed over to her owners next day.

== Operational history ==
=== U.S. Navy service, World War I ===
Following an established practice all vessels built for the EFC were transferred to the U.S. Navy upon completion. On 11 January 1919 it was announced that West Compo would be the last of Portland-built vessels to be turned over to the Navy and there would be no further vessel transfers after January 31. Following completion of her sea trials, the freighter was delivered to USSB and then to the Navy on February 1. After examination the ship was commissioned into the NOTS on 3 February 1919, with Lieutenant Commander A. A. Modeer, USNRF, in command, assigned Identification number of 3912, and immediately proceeded for loading. After embarking a cargo of 82,266 barrels of wheat flour, West Compo left Portland on February 9 also carrying on board federal inspectors. The inspectors disembarked the vessel in Astoria after ascertaining the vessel performed satisfactorily on her loaded run down the Columbia River, while the freighter continued on her maiden journey. After a call at San Francisco, West Compo transited the Panama Canal on March 2, called at Norfolk in mid-March for bunkers before continuing on to the Mediterranean finally reaching Trieste on April 9. (Note: Many West ships, to avoid sailing empty to the East Coast, loaded grain products intended for the United Kingdom, France, and Italy, sailed to Europe without unloading or transferring their cargo, which avoided extra handling of the cargo. The United States Shipping Board, by prior arrangement, received an equivalent amount of cargo space in foreign ships for other American cargos. See: Crowell and Wilson, pp. 358–59.) After unloading her cargo and taking on sand ballast, she departed Italy on April 19 and arrived at Philadelphia via Gibraltar on May 15. She was decommissioned one week later, and returned to the USSB.

=== Commercial service ===
Following decommissioning from the Navy service, USSB allocated West Compo to Strachan Shipping Company to operate on their Southeast United States to France and Low Countries routes. The vessel cleared from Philadelphia on 27 May 1919 bound for Savannah where she loaded 20,665 bales of cotton and sailed for Le Havre on June 13. On her next trip to Europe she carried 7,100 tons of phosphate rock from Fernandina to Denmark. West Compo continued serving these routes until the end of her career. For example, in August 1920 she again carried 7,100 tons of hard rock phosphate from Florida ports of Jacksonville and Fernandina to Bremen and Fredericia. On her last return trip from Stettin and Brest she became disabled soon after leaving the French port on 11 April 1921 and had to be put back with a help of the USSB tug for quick repairs. West Compo arrived at Savannah on May 4 where she was returned by Strachan Shipping to the USSB due to overabundance of tonnage and scarcity of cargo. The freighter remained moored in Savannah for the next year and a half. In November 1922 it was announced the ship together with several other vessels was set to be relocated to Eustis to be laid up. The freighter was first towed to Charleston in early December 1922 where she remained for the next eight month before finally arriving in Newport News on 15 August 1923 to become part of the USSB reserve fleet.

In November 1929 the Shipping Board contemplated reconditioning of six ships, including West Compo, in anticipation of increased cotton, wheat and flour traffic out of Gulf ports to Europe, but that work was never performed. In early September 1932 the Shipping Board decided to scrap 124 World War I era vessels in its possession, including West Compo, to alleviate significant tonnage overabundance. As a result, all the vessels were removed from the U.S. register of shipping. In October 1932 it was announced the whole lot of these vessels was sold to the Boston Iron and Metal Company of Baltimore for $1.51/ton of recoverable of material which was believed at the time to be over 350,000 tons. The disposition was estimated take about three years to complete and West Compo was eventually scrapped in April 1936.

== Bibliography ==
- Crowell, Benedict; Robert Forrest Wilson (1921). The Road to France: The Transportation of Troops and Military Supplies, 1917–1918. How America Went to War: An Account From Official Sources of the Nation's War Activities, 1917–1920. New Haven: Yale University Press. OCLC 18696066.
- Jordan, Roger W. (2006) [1999]. The World's Merchant Fleets, 1939: The Particulars And Wartime Fates of 6,000 Ships. Annapolis, Maryland: Naval Institute Press. ISBN 978-1-59114-959-0. OCLC 150361480.
- Naval Historical Center. "West Compo". Dictionary of American Naval Fighting Ships. Navy Department, Naval History and Heritage Command.
