= Ruth (1895 sternwheeler) =

- Ruth moored at Salem, Oregon, during flood, sometime between 1895 and 1898, with smaller sternwheeler Gypsy alongside.

History
- Name: Ruth
- Owner: Oregon Railroad & Navigation Co.
- Route: Willamette River
- Builder: Oregon Railroad & Navigation Co.
- Launched: 31 December 1895
- Maiden voyage: 10 January 1896
- Out of service: 1920
- Identification: US Official Number 111103

General characteristics
- Class & type: riverine steamboat, passenger/freighter
- Tonnage: 416 GRT; 372 NRT
- Length: 156 ft 4 in (47.65 m)
- Beam: 34 ft 0 in (10.36 m)
- Depth: 4 ft 6 in (1.37 m)
- Installed power: Twin single-cylinder horizontally mounted steam engines, 14" bore by 54" stroke, 13 NHP
- Propulsion: stern wheeler
- Crew: 20

The steamboat Ruth operated from 1896 to 1917 on the Willamette River in the U.S. state of Oregon. Ruth played an important role in the transport of goods and agricultural products in Oregon, and was one of the fastest steamboats ever to operate on the upper Willamette. This vessel should not be confused with the sternwheeler Ruth built at Libby, Montana in 1896.

== The wheat trade ==
Farmers would grow wheat in the Willamette Valley, then bring it by wagon to river ports where it would be bagged and loaded onto steamboats bound downriver to Portland. One of the key centers to the wheat trade was the now-abandoned town of Lincoln, Oregon, in Polk County. Originally known as Doak's Ferry, Lincoln was about 6 miles (9.7 km) south of Salem, Oregon. Lincoln, was once the most important wheat port on the Willamette, as historian Corning describes:

Farmers from a wide area hauled their grain to Lincoln: and at the height of its prosperity, when river shipping was at its best, the town had five large warehouses, a grist mill, saw mill, beehive factory, blacksmith shop, tin shop, shoe and harness shop, store, lodge hall, church, school, and several dwellings, as well as the ferry that had operated since the early forties. Essentially a place of commerce, Lincoln one year shipped 350,000 bushels of wheat from its warehouses -- a record never equalled by any shipping point in the Willamette Valley except Portland.

== Operations ==
By the 1890s, rail construction in the Willamette Valley had caused a sharp decline in steamboat traffic, as more and more freight was shipped by rail rather than water. Lincoln remained an exception, and well into the 1890s three steamboats a day called at the town. The vessels would leave Portland in the morning, pass through the Willamette Locks, and arrive at Lincoln at about 3:00 p.m. Ruth, when newly launched, was able to beat this time, and under Captain Miles Bell, set what may have been a record time for the Lincoln run, as historian Corning describes:

Captain John Sprong, operator of the ferry, told of hearing a boat coming up the river while he was at lunch. Believing that his watch had failed him, he rushed out onto the bank, where the Ruth was just drawing in, and asked the crew for the time of day. Captain Bell answered: "12:25, Johnny, and don't forget that!" The standing record had been surpassed by more than two hours.

In addition to the Willamette, Ruth was also worked on the Yamhill River up to Dayton, Oregon.

Steamboat operation was hazardous during this time. The vessels were endangered by snags and other dangers in the rivers, and even when there was no overall threat to the vessel, the crewmen themselves were at risk. This was illustrated by an incident involving Ruth which occurred on February 16, 1901, which was investigated by the Portland local office of the Steamboat Inspection Service:

At about 4.30 a. m., while the steamer Ruth was en route from Portland to Corvallis. Oreg., she struck a piece of driftwood near the mouth of the Santiam River, Oregon, Willamette River. The watchman, Ira Bell, was sent into the hold to see if any damage had been done to the hull. He has not been seen since that time, and is supposed to have fallen overboard and drowned.

During the fiscal year, there were three other instances in the local Portland District of the Steamboat Inspection Service of crewmen drowning as a result of falling overboard.

== Disposition ==
The Oregonian newspaper of March 31, 1917 reported that the Ruth was struck by the stern of the newly launched all-steel Vesterlide, the first ship produced by the Northwest Steel shipyard located at the foot of SW Sheridan Street. The Ruth sank as the result of this collision, and three were injured.
