= USS Western Chief =

Cargo ship of the United States Navy

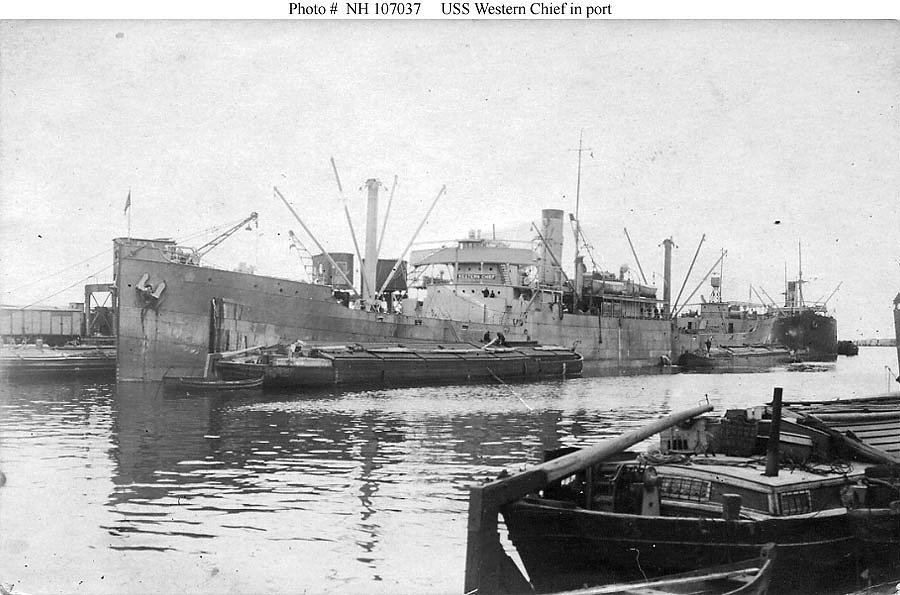
- USS Western Chief (ID-3161) in a European port in 1919.

History

United States
- Name: USS Western Chief
- Builder: Northwest Steel Company, Portland, Oregon
- Launched: 20 April 1918
- Completed: 1918
- Acquired: 3 July 1918
- Commissioned: 3 July 1918
- Decommissioned: 28 June 1919
- Stricken: 28 June 1919
- Fate: Returned to U.S. Shipping Board 28 June 1919
- Notes: In mercantile service from 1919; Sold to United Kingdom early in World War II; Sunk 14 March 1941

General characteristics
- Type: Cargo ship
- Displacement: 12,185 tons
- Length: 423 ft 9 in (129.16 m)
- Beam: 54 ft 0 in (16.46 m)
- Draft: 24 ft 2 in (7.37 m) (mean)
- Depth: 29 ft 9 in (9.07 m)
- Propulsion: One 2,500-ihp (1.864-mW) steam engine, one shaft
- Speed: 10.5 knots (19.4 km/h; 12.1 mph)
- Complement: 99
- Armament: 1 × 5-inch (127-mm) gun; 1 × 3-inch (76.2-mm) gun

USS Western Chief (ID-3161) was a cargo ship of the United States Navy that served during World War I and its immediate aftermath. As SS Western Chief, she was sunk during World War II after being sold to the United Kingdom for use as a merchant ship.

== Construction and acquisition ==
Western Chief was laid down as the steel-hulled, single-screw commercial cargo ship SS Western Chief by the Northwest Steel Company in Portland, Oregon, for the Compagnie Générale of France under a United States Shipping Board contract. She was launched on 20 April 1918. The Shipping Board transferred her to the U.S. Navy at Portland on 3 July 1918 for use during World War I. Assigning her the naval registry identification number 3161, the Navy commissioned her at Portland on 3 July 1918 as USS Western Chief (ID-3161).

== Navy career ==
Assigned to the Naval Overseas Transportation Service, Western Chief departed Portland on 12 July 1918 carrying 7,170 tons of flour and proceeded via the Panama Canal to New York City, making port there on 15 August 1918. After unloading her flour, she loaded 20 trucks and moved to Norfolk, Virginia, from which she got underway on 22 August 1918 as part of a convoy bound for France. She arrived at Brest, France, on 22 September 1918.

Western Chief departed Brest on 8 October 1918 for the return voyage to the United States. She reached New York on 24 October 1918, then got underway again the same day and steamed to Newport News, Virginia.

Western Chief made three more round-trip cargo runs to Europe. She was at sea on the first of these voyages bound for La Pallice, France, when the armistice with Germany ended World War I.

On 16 April 1919, Western Chief got underway for Europe with a full cargo of flour, beginning her final U.S. Navy voyage. She called at the Hook of Holland; Dartmouth, England; Danzig, Germany; and Copenhagen, Denmark, before she returned to the United States, making port at Baltimore, Maryland, on 25 June 1919.

== Decommissioning and disposal ==
Western Chief was decommissioned, struck from the Navy list, and transferred back to the U.S. Shipping Board on 28 June 1919.

== Later career ==
Once again SS Western Chief, the ship was in mercantile service from 1919.

Early in World War II, the British government purchased Western Chief to help to alleviate the shipping shortage the United Kingdom faced due to losses to Axis submarines. In British service, Western Chief was on a voyage, under Captain Eric Alexander Brown, Master with Hogarth's shipowners, as a part of Convoy SC 24 when she was sunk at 13:07 on 14 March 1941 by the Italian submarine Emo in the North Atlantic Ocean 250 nautical miles (463 km) south of Iceland at 58°52′N 21°13′W.
