= Northwest Steel =

Defunct company in Portland, Oregon, U.S.

Coordinates: 45.50451°N 122.66976°W

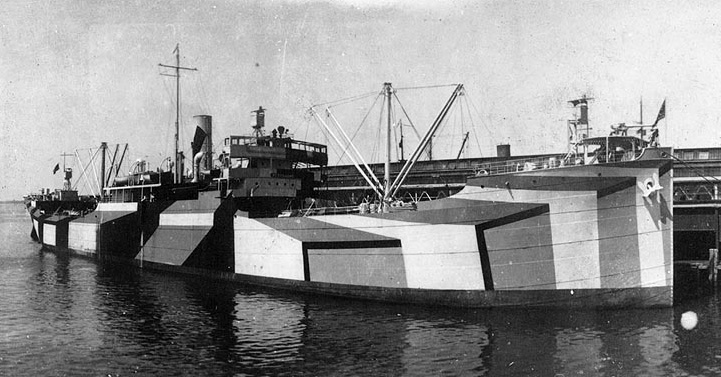
West Shore, one of the "West" boats built at Northwest Steel

Northwest Steel was a structural steel fabricator and shipbuilding company in Portland, Oregon. During World War I the yard built cargo ships for the United States Shipping Board (USSB). Some 37 of the 46 ships built at Northwest Steel were the West boats, a series of 5,500-gross register ton (GRT) steel-hulled cargo ships built for the USSB on the West Coast of the United States as part of the World War I war effort.

== History ==
The Northwest Steel Company was incorporated in August 1903.

In July 1913, NW Steel began construction of a new plant, to be complete February 1914, after its present site was purchased by the public dock commission. Location of the new plant is a newly built 300x350 feet dock. Planned are a 60x800-foot main shop, 50x100-foot blacksmith shop, 50x100-foot machine shop and a 50x100-foot template shop.

Work on shipyard facilities began with dredging on April 1, 1916. everything built was as extensions of the existing company plant. The mold loft was begun the first week of May, the ways were constructed starting in late May. The first keel was hurried and laid down on July 9, 1916 with some improvisation in the still not fully finished yard. Eventually there was also a large rivet and bolt shop erected to handle the demand, including for boat spikes of the numerous wooden hull constructors in the vicinity, production for the boat spikes alone amounting to 14 tons a day in 1918. See also: 1921 Industrial Map of Portland. The shipyard was sandwiched between the river to the east, the yard of the Columbia River Shipbuilding Company to the south, railroad tracks to the west and the Portland Lumber Company mill to the north. Northwest Steel was the largest of the 4 steel shipyards in the Portland / Vancouver region.

In May 1918, contracts were awarded for a $17,500 mold loft to be built at the company's site at the foot of Sheridan Street. In July 1918, NW Steel planned to build 4 additional slipways at its plant site.

In February 1919 it was announced that Northwest Steel had retired from the structural steel field. The Northwest Bridge & Iron Co., headed by W.H. Cullers, was taking over this end of the business and was looking for a new plant site. In January 1920, Bridge & Iron took over the rest of Northwest Steel's business.

It was headed by Joseph R. Bowles, who was indicted for bribing a government official in about 1918 and then convicted of contempt of court. He was later described as a "greedy, domineering and difficult person, with no sense of civic responsibility."

The first ship built at Northwest Steel was the cargo ship War Baron, originally launched on March 31, 1917, as the Cunard Line ship Vesterlide, a British-flagged ship sunk by German submarine U-55 in January 1918. The final ship built was the 8,200 GRT tanker Swiftwind, completed in June 1921.

31 Men Tackle City Wood Yards

Thirty-one men reported this morning for work in the municipal woodyard, located in the sheds of the old Northwestern Steel Company, foot of Sheridan Street. The yard was opened upon recommendation of the mayor's committee on unemployment to allow men who need board and lodging an opportunity to earn it without loss of self respect by begging.

Oregon Daily Journal, December 20, 1921

== Ships ==
Names in parentheses are original names, changed before the ship was launched, or in the case of War Baron changed shortly after launch. All requisitioned ships were cargo ships of 8,800dwt.

| Yard# | Owner | Name | Engine (Note: Midwest - Midwest Engineering Co., Indianapolis, 605nhp compound turbine: Vulcan - 605nhp compound turbine; GE - General Electric Co., Schenectady, NY, 576nhp-583nhp turbine; DeLaval - DeLaval Steam Turbine Co., Trenton, NJ, 676nhp turbine; HOR - Hooven-Owens-Rentschler, Hamilton, OH, triple expansion diameters 27.5-46-78, stroke 51; HOR2 - 3exp 24.5-41.5-72/48) | Launched (Note: See List of ship launches in 1917 etc. for references) |
|---|---|---|---|---|
| 1 | Shipping Controller | Vesterlide (War Baron) | | 31 Mar 17 |
| 2 | Shipping Controller (Note: Requisitioned and soon after released to original owner.) | (Vesterlen) War Viceroy | | 2 Aug 17 |
Requisitioned by the USSB
| Yard# | Orig. Owner | Name | Engine | Launched |
| 3 | | (Hallgrim) West Wind | GE 508nhp | 4 Nov 17 |
| 4 | Shipping Controller | (War Archer) West Shore | GE 508nhp | 13 Jan 18 |
| 5 | | (Landaas) Westland | GE 508nhp | 14 Sep 17 |
| 6 | Shipping Controller | (War Ally) Westchester | GE 508nhp | 5 Dec 17 |
| 7 | Shipping Controller | (War Pearl) Westhampton | GE | 8 Feb 18 |
| 8 | | (Umpqua) Western Wave | DeLaval 579nhp | 6 Mar 18 |
| 9 | French Line | (Joffre) Western Ocean | GE | 19 Mar 18 |
| 10 | French Line | (Marne) Western Chief | GE 508nhp | 20 Apr 18 |
| 11 | French Line | (Verdun) Western Spirit | GE | 6 May 18 |
| 12 | French Line | (Pershing) Western Light | GE | 27 May 18 |
| 13 | French Line | (Aisne) Western Maid | DeLaval 594nhp | 6 Jul 18 |
| 14 | French Line | (Argonne) Western Comet | DeLaval | 23 Jul 18 |
| 15 | French Line | (Somme) Western Scout | DeLaval | 12 Aug 18 |
| 16 | French Line | (Meuse) West View | DeLaval | 26 Aug 18 |
USSB contract
| Yard# | USSB# | Name | Engine | Launched |
| 17 | 1073 (Note: Hulls 1073-1080: Design 1013 ship, USSB contract No. 157) | West Kyska | GE | 7 Oct 18 |
| 18 | 1074 | West Zeda | GE | 26 Oct 18 |
| 19 | 1075 | West Wauna | GE | 9 Nov 18 |
| 20 | 1076 | West Compo | GE | 27 Nov 18 |
| 21 | 1077 | West Modus | GE | 21 Dec 18 |
| 22 | 1078 | West Tacook | GE | 14 Jan 19 |
| 23 | 1079 | West Togus | GE | 28 Jan 19 |
| 24 | 1080 | West Nohno | GE | 12 Feb 19 |
| 25 | 1414 (Note: Hulls 1414-1421: Design 1013 ship, USSB contract No. 217) | West Cherow | GE | 28 Feb 19 |
| 26 | 1415 | West Celeron | GE | 17 Mar 19 |
| 27 | 1416 | West Celina | GE | 28 Mar 19 |
| 28 | 1417 | West Chaska / Deer Lodge | GE | 11 Apr 19 |
| 29 | 1418 | West Chatala / Tripp | GE | 23 Apr 19 |
| 30 | 1419 | West Chatala | GE | 3 May 19 |
| 31 | 1420 | West Segovia | GE | 21 May 19 |
| 32 | 1421 | West Cheswald | GE | 20 Jun 19 |
| 33 | 2368 (Note: Hulls 2368-2377: Design 1013 ship, USSB contract No. 458, 2372,2373,2374 finished privately after cancellation) | West Raritan | Vulcan | 6 Aug 19 |
| 34 | 2369 | West Pocasset | Midwest | 18 Aug 19 |
| 35 | 2370 | West Saginaw | Midwest | 6 Sep 19 |
| 36 | 2371 | West Jaffrey | Fletcher | 30 Sep 19 |
| 37 | 2372 | West Joplin / J.R. Gordon | HOR2 | |
| 38 | 2373 | West Minsi / Centaurus | HOR2 | 17 Nov 19 |
| 39 | 2374 | West Matas / Clauseus | HOR2 | |
| n/a | 2375 | West Croswicks | cancelled | |
| n/a | 2376 | West Paramas | cancelled | |
| n/a | 2377 | West Bomoken | cancelled | |
by Northwest Bridge & Iron
| 40 | 2865 (Note: 12,000dwt tanker) | Swiftsure | HOR | 15 Dec 20 |
| 41 | 2866 | Swiftarrow | HOR | 18 Jan 21 |
| 42 | 2867 | Swiftstar | HOR | 5 Feb 21 |
| 43 | 2868 | Swiftscout | HOR | 12 Mar 21 |
| 44 | 2869 | Swifteagle | HOR | 9 Apr 21 |
| 45 | 2870 | Swiftlight | HOR | |
| 46 | 2871 | Swiftwind | HOR | |

== Buildings ==
The Northwest Steel Co. was contracted to furnish structural steel for at least these buildings:

| Contract | Building | Tonnage | Ref |
|---|---|---|---|
| Nov 1910 | Corbett Building | 1,000 | |
| May 1912 | Sandy River Bridge | 119 | |
| Oct 1912 | a building in Portland for the Pacific Telephone & Telegraph Co. (see) | 1,203 | |
| Jan 1913 | Eagle Creek Bridge, Portland | 300 | |
| Aug 1913 | public dock No. 1 | 299 | |
| May 1914 | Meier & Frank Building, Portland | 3,500 | |
| July 1914 | highway bridges at Astoria | 101 | |
| May 1915 | Coliseum building, Seattle | 404 | |
| June 1915 | First National Bank Building, Portland | 340 | |
| May 1916 | two 400-foot wireless towers for the U.S. Government in Keyport | 233 | |

== Bibliography ==
- Colton, Tim (25 August 2021). "Northwest Steel, Portland OR". Shipbuildinghistory.com. shipbuildinghistory.com. Archived from the original on 6 November 2022.
- Helgason, Guðmundur. "Ships hit during WWI: War Baron". U-boat War in WWI. Uboat.net.
- MacColl, E. Kimbark (November 1979). The Growth of a City: Power and Politics in Portland, Oregon 1915 to 1950. The Georgian Press. p. 29. ISBN 0-9603408-1-5. LCCN 79022316.
- Maritime Administration. "PORTMAR". Vessel Status Card. U.S. Department of Transportation, Maritime Administration.
