= SS Western Comet =

History

United States
- Name: USS Western Comet
- Namesake: Previous name retained
- Builder: Northwest Steel Company, Portland, Oregon
- Launched: 23 July 1918
- Acquired: 22 September 1918
- Commissioned: 22 September 1918
- Decommissioned: 1 March 1919
- Fate: Transferred to U.S. Shipping Board 1 March 1919
- Notes: In U.S. Shipping Board custody as SS Western Comet 1919-1933; Abandoned 1933

General characteristics
- Type: Cargo ship
- Tonnage: 5,871 GRT
- Displacement: 12,185 long tons (12,381 t)
- Length: 423 ft 9 in (129.16 m)
- Beam: 54 ft 0 in (16.46 m)
- Draft: 24 ft 0 in (7.32 m) mean
- Depth of hold: 29 ft 9 in (9.07 m)
- Propulsion: Steam engine, one shaft
- Speed: 10.5 knots (19.4 km/h; 12.1 mph)
- Complement: 109
- Armament: 1 × 4-inch (102-mm) gun; 1 × 3-inch (76.2-mm) gun

USS Western Comet (ID-3569) was a United States Navy cargo ship in commission from 1918 to 1919.

== Construction, acquisition, and commissioning ==
Western Comet was constructed in 1918 as the commercial steel-hulled, single-screw cargo ship SS Argonne under a United States Shipping Board contract by the Northwest Steel Company at Portland, Oregon, for the French Compagnie Generale. She was launched on 23 July 1918. The U.S. Shipping Board took control of Argonne and renamed her SS Western Comet, then transferred her to the U.S. Navy on 22 September 1918 for use during World War I. The Navy assigned her the naval registry identification number 3569 and commissioned her the same day as USS Western Comet (ID-3569).

== Operational history ==
Assigned to the Naval Overseas Transportation Service, Western Comet got underway on 2 October 1918 for New York City with a cargo of flour. Proceeding via the Panama Canal, she arrived at New York on 31 October 1918 and loaded 24 trucks. Departing New York on 11 November 1918 —the day the Armistice with Germany was signed, ending hostilities in World War I – she reached Le Havre, France, on 28 November 1918. There she took on board 1,400 tons of United States Army cargo.

Western Comet departed Le Havre on 1 January 1919 bound for New York City. During her transatlantic crossing, however, she was forced to put into Bermuda on 19 January 1919 to repair turbine trouble. She got underway from Bermuda on 5 February 1919 and proceeded in company with the U.S. Navy tug USS Mohave (Tug No. 15) to New York, where she arrived on 7 February 1919.

== Decommissioning and disposal ==
Western Belle was decommissioned at New York on 1 March 1919 and the Navy transferred her back to the U.S. Shipping Board the same day. The Shipping Board operated her commercially as SS Western Comet

On 8 July 1921, Western Comet ran aground at Saint-Nazaire, France. She was refloated on 21 July 1921.

The Shipping Board retained custody of Western Comet until she was abandoned in 1933.
