= SS West Saginaw =

1919 ship scrapped in 1961

History
- Name: West Saginaw (1919–1941); Empire Cougar (1941–1946); Aurora (1946–1948); Cougar (1948–1951); Favola (1951–1960)
- Owner: United States Shipping Board (1922–1937); United States Maritime Commission (1937–1941); Ministry of War Transport (1941–1945); Ministry of Transport (1945–1946); Aurora Shipping Company (1946–1948); Compagnia Maritima del Este (1948–1951); Trama Trasporti Marittimi SpA (1951–1959); Compagnia Comercial y Financiera Sudamericana (1959–1960)
- Operator: United States Shipping Board (1922–1937); United States Maritime Commission (1937–1941); G Heyn & Son (1941–1946); Goulandris Bros (1946–1948); Compagnia Maritima del Este (1948–1951); Trama Trasporti Marittimi SpA (1951–1959); Compagnia Armatoriale Italiana (1959–1960)
- Port of registry: Portland, United States (1919–1941); London, United Kingdom (1941–1948); Panama City, Panama (1948–1951); Italy (1951–1961)
- Builder: Northwest Steel Company
- Yard number: 35
- Launched: 6 September 1919
- Out of service: February 1961
- Identification: United States Official Number 218964 (1919–1941); United Kingdom Official Number 168199 (1941–1948); Code Letters LTBN (1919–34); Code Letters KLDA (1934–41); Code Letters GPDP (1941–48)
- Fate: Scrapped

General characteristics
- Class & type: Design 1013 Ship
- Tonnage: 6,187 GRT (1919–1940); 5,758 GRT (1940–1961); 3,827 NRT (1919–1940); 3,598 NRT (1940–1961); 8,800 DWT (1940–1961)
- Length: 409 ft 8 in (124.87 m)
- Beam: 54 ft 2 in (16.51 m)
- Draught: 30 ft 2 in (9.19 m)
- Depth: 27 ft 7 in (8.41 m)
- Installed power: 2 Steam turbines, double reduction geared
- Propulsion: Screw propeller
- Speed: 11 knots (20 km/h)

West Saginaw was a 5,758 GRT Design 1013 cargo ship that was built in 1919 by Northwest Steel Company, Portland, Oregon, United States. She was built for the United States Shipping Board, passing to the United States Maritime Commission in 1936. In 1941, she was transferred to the British Ministry of War Transport and renamed Empire Cougar.

She spent the war sailing between the United Kingdom and the Caribbean, mostly sailing via the United States with some voyages made via Africa. She carried coal or fertilizer outbound, and returned with sugar. Empire Cougar was sold post-war and renamed Aurora. In 1948, she was sold to Panama and renamed Cougar, In 1951, she was sold to Italy and renamed Favola, serving until she was scrapped in 1961.

== Design ==
The ship was built in 1919 by Northwest Steel Company, Portland, Oregon. She was yard number 35.

The ship was 409 feet 8 inches (124.87 m) long, with a beam of 54 feet 2 inches (16.51 m). She had a depth of 27 feet 7 inches (8.41 m) and a draught of 30 feet 2 inches (9.19 m). She was assessed at 6,187 GRT, 3,827 NRT. Her DWT was 8,800.

The ship was propelled by two steam turbines of 605 nhp, double reduction geared, driving a single screw propeller. The turbines were manufactured by Mid West Engineering Co, Indianapolis, Indiana. They could propel her at 11 knots (20 km/h).

== History ==
=== Pre-war ===
West Saginaw was built for the United States Shipping Board (USSB). She was launched in October 1919. The United States Official Number 218964 and Code Letters LTBN were allocated. Her port of registry was Portland, Oregon. On 11 June 1925, West Saginaw struck a submerged object off Nantucket, Massachusetts and was beached. She was refloated the next day. On 14 February 1930, West Saginaw was on a voyage from the United Kingdom to Houston, Texas when she was in collision with the South Goodwin Lightship in dense fog. West Saginaw was undamaged, whilst damage to the lightship was slight. Following the changes to Code Letters in 1934, West Saginaw was allocated the Code Letters KLDA. The USSB became the United States Maritime Commission in 1937.

=== Second World War ===
==== West Saginaw ====
In February 1941, West Saginaw was transferred to the Ministry of War Transport. The Official Number 160899 was allocated. Her Code Letters were GPDP. She was operated under the management of G Heyn & Son Ltd, Belfast. She was a member of Convoy SC 32, which departed Halifax, Nova Scotia on 19 May 1941 and arrived at Liverpool, Lancashire on 7 June. West Saginaw was carrying a cargo of phosphates. She then joined Convoy WN 139, which departed Oban, Argyllshire on 10 June and arrived at Methil, Fife on 14 June.

==== Empire Cougar ====
West Saginaw was renamed Empire Cougar. She was assessed as 5,578 GRT, 3,598 NRT She joined Convoy EC 46, which departed Southend-on-Sea on 15 July and arrived at the River Clyde on 20 July. Empire Cougar was a member of Convoy ON 1, which departed Liverpool, Lancashire on 26 July 1941 and dispersed at sea on 19 August. She then sailed to New York, United States, arriving on 14 August. She departed New York on 6 September and arrived at Sydney, Nova Scotia on 10 September. Empire Cougar was a member of Convoy SC 44, which departed Sydney on 11 September and arrived at Liverpool on 30 September. She was carrying a cargo of steel. She left the convoy at Belfast Lough, joining Convoy BB 82, which departed Belfast Lough on 30 September and arrived at Milford Haven, Pembrokeshire on 1 October. Empire Cougar then sailed to Newport, Monmouthshire, arriving on 2 October.

She departed Newport on 12 October and arrived at Milford Haven on 13 October. She departed Milford Haven on 15 October, and joined Convoy ON 27, which departed Liverpool on 16 October and dispersed at sea on 2 November. Empire Cougar was bound for Philadelphia, Pennsylvania, arriving on 8 November. She departed Philadelphia on 21 November for Sydney, arriving on 26 November. Empire Cougar was due to sail in Convoy SC 57, which departed Sydney on 28 November and arrived at Liverpool on 15 December. She is recorded as carrying a cargo of steel and being bound for Hull, Yorkshire. She joined Convoy SC 58, which departed Sydney on 4 December and arrived at Liverpool on 21 December. She left the convoy at Loch Ewe on 18 December, joining Convoy WN 220, which departed Oban, Argyllshire on 18 December and arrived at Methil, Fife on 21 December. Empire Cougar then joined Convoy FS 679, which departed Methil on 21 December and arrived at Southend, Essex on 23 December. She left the convoy at Hull.

Empire Cougar joined Convoy FN 603, which had departed Southend on 12 January 1942 and arrived at Methil on 14 January. She then joined Convoy EN 32, which departed Methil on 14 January and arrived at Oban on 17 January. She then joined Convoy ON 57, which had departed from Liverpool on 13 January and dispersed at sea at 42°20′N 59°39′W on 7 February. Empire Cougar was listed as being bound for Baltimore, Maryland. She arrived at Halifax on 6 February and sailed the next day for Baltimore, arriving on 12 February.

Empire Cougar departed Baltimore on 19 March and arrived at Halifax on 24 March. She was due to join Convoy SC 76, which departed Halifax on 24 March and arrived at Liverpool on 11 April. She joined Convoy SC 77, which departed Halifax on 30 March and arrived at Liverpool on 16 April. She was carrying steel and general cargo, bound for Manchester, Lancashire. Empire Cougar joined Convoy OS 27, which departed Liverpool on 2 May and arrived at Freetown, Sierra Leone on 19 May. She then sailed to Kingston, Jamaica, arriving on 25 May.

Empire Cougar departed Kingston on 20 June and arrived at Key West, Florida on 23 June. She then joined Convoy KN 114, which departed Key West on 27 June and arrived at the Hampton Roads, Virginia on 2 July. She departed the Hampton Roads the next day for New York, arriving on 5 July. From New York, she sailed to Cape Cod Bay, Massachusetts. On 9 July, Empire Cougar joined Convoy BX 28, which departed Boston, Massachusetts that day and arrived at Halifax on 11 July. She then joined Convoy HS 28, which departed Halifax on 14 July and arrived at Sydney on 16 July. Empire Cougar was a member of Convoy SC 92, which departed Sydney on 17 July and arrived at Liverpool on 31 July. She was carrying a cargo of sugar and 200 tons of mail. She departed from Liverpool on 15 August, sailing to Holyhead, Anglesey, from where she joined Convoy BB 210, which had departed from Belfast Lough on 15 August and arrived at Milford Haven on 16 August. Her destination was Barry, South Glamorgan, where she arrived on 17 August.

Empire Cougar departed Barry on 27 August for Milford Haven, arriving the next day. She then joined Convoy OS 39, which departed from Liverpool on 30 August and arrived at Freetown on 18 September. She was carrying a cargo of coal. She departed Freetown on 16 October as a member of Convoy SL 125. The convoy arrived at Liverpool on 9 November. Empire Cougar was reported as arriving with engine defects. She departed Loch Ewe on 12 November as a member of Convoy WN 360, which arrived at Methil on 14 November. She then joined Convoy FS 961, which departed Methil on 15 November and arrived as Southend on 17 November.

Empire Cougar departed Southend on 14 December as a member of Convoy FS 891, which arrived at Methil on 16 December. She then joined Convoy EN 174, which departed Methil that day and arrived at Loch Ewe on 18 December. Empire Cougar the joined Convoy ON 154, which departed Liverpool on 18 December and arrived at New York on 12 January 1943. Her destination was Halifax, where she arrived on 7 January. She then sailed to New York. Empire Cougar was a member of Convoy NG 338, which departed New York on 19 January and arrived at Guantanamo Bay, Cuba on 26 January. She departed Guantanamo Bay that day as a member of Convoy GAT 40, which arrived at Trinidad on 1 February. Empire Cougar was bound for Kingston, arriving on 27 January. She sailed from Kingston on 11 February for San Pedro de Macorís, Dominican Republic, arriving on 14 February. On 25 February, Empire Cougar departed San Pedro de Macorís for Guantanamo Bay, arriving on 26 February. She then joined Convoy GN 44, which departed Guantanamo Bay on 28 February and arrived at New York on 7 March. She then joined Convoy SC 123, which departed New York on 14 March and arrived at Liverpool on 3 April. Empire Cougar was carrying a cargo of sugar. She departed Liverpool on 22 April for Barry, arriving on 24 April. She is next recorded as arriving at Milford Haven on 2 May and returning to Barry that day.

On 4 May, Empire Cougar departed Milford Haven to join Convoy OS 47/KMS 14, which departed Liverpool on 5 May and split at sea on 16 May. Empire Cougar was in the part of the convoy which became Convoy OS 47. She was destined for Dakar, French West Africa with a cargo of coal. She arrived at Dakar on 23 May. She then sailed to Bathurst, South Africa, arriving on 10 June and departing the same day for Dakar. She then returned to Bathurst, joining Convoy OS 49, which departed on 20 June, and arrived at Freetown on 23 June. On 23 July, Empire Cougar departed Freetown as a member of Convoy SL 133, which joined Convoy MKS 18 at sea on 26 July, and arrived at Loch Ewe on 4 August. She then joined Convoy WN 463, which departed Loch Ewe on 5 August and arrived at Methil on 6 August. She departed Methil on 7 August as a member of Convoy FS 1188, which arrived at Southend on 9 August. She left the convoy for a destination on the Tyne, arriving on 8 August.

Empire Cougar departed the Tyne on 28 August, joining Convoy FS 1206, which departed Methil that day and arrived at Southend on 30 August. She then joined Convoy CW 204, which departed Southend on 31 August and arrived at St Helens Roads on 1 September. She then joined Convoy PW 398, which departed Portsmouth, Hampshire on 11 September and arrived at Milford Haven on 13 September. She was bound for Penarth, South Glamorgan, arriving on 14 September.

The movements of Empire Cougar during the next few weeks are unclear, but she departed Barry on 5 October and arrived at Milford Haven the following day, joining Convoy OS 56/KMS 29, which departed Liverpool on 7 October and split at sea on 18 October. She was carrying a cargo of coal and was bound for Freetown. Arrival at Freetown was on 29 October. Empire Cougar departed Freetown on 12 November as a member of Convoy SL 140, which joined Convoy MKS 31 and arrived at Liverpool on 7 December. She arrived at Loch Ewe on 6 December, joining Convoy WN 515, which departed Loch Ewe on 8 December and arrived at Methil on 9 December. She then joined Convoy FS 1296, which departed Methil on 10 December and arrived at Southend on 12 December. Empire Cougar was destined for the Tyne, arriving on 11 December.

On 7 January 1944, Empire Cougar departed the Tyne, joining Convoy FN 1228, which had departed Southend on 6 January and arrived at Methil on 8 January. She then joined Convoy EN 330, which departed Methil on 10 January and arrived at Loch Ewe on 12 January. She was bound for Oban, arriving on 13 January. Empire Cougar departed Oban on 14 January, joining Convoy ONS 27, which departed Liverpool on 13 January and arrived at Halifax on 31 January. She then joined Convoy XB 94, which departed Halifax on 31 January and arrived at the Cape Cod Canal, Massachusetts on 2 February. She then sailed to New York, arriving on 3 February. Empire Cougar departed New York on 16 February as a member of Convoy NG 417, arriving at Guantanamo Bay on 23 February. She departed Guantanamo Bay that day for San Juan, Puerto Rico, arriving on 25 February. She departed San Juan on 1 March for San Pedro de Macorís, Puerto Rico, arriving the next day. Empire Cougar departed San Pedro de Macorís on 12 March for Guantanamo Bay, arriving on 14 March. She then joined Convoy GN 121, which departed Guantanamo Bay on 19 March and arrived at New York on 26 March. She departed New York on 28 March for Boston, from where she departed on 2 April, joining Convoy BX 102, which arrived at Halifax on 4 April. She then joined Convoy SC 157, which departed Halifax on 17 April and arrived at Liverpool on 1 May. Empire Cougar was carrying a cargo of sugar. She left the convoy at Loch Ewe on 1 May, joining Convoy WN 577, which departed the next day and arrived at Methil on 3 May. She then joined Convoy FS 1442, which departed Methil on 4 May and arrived at Southend on 6 May.

Empire Cougar departed Southend on 5 June 1944 as a member of Convoy FN 1379, which arrived at Methil on 7 June. She was bound for Middlesbrough, arriving on 7 June. She departed Middlesbrough on 9 June, joining Convoy FN 1382, which departed Southend on 8 June and arrived at Methil on 10 June. She then joined Convoy EN 396, which departed Methil on 12 June and arrived at Loch Ewe on 14 June. Empire Cougar then joined Convoy ON 242, which departed Liverpool on 25 June and arrived at New York on 11 July. She was carrying a cargo of phosphates, and put into Halifax on 9 July requiring repairs to her turbines. She departed Halifax on 12 July, joining Convoy XB 125, which arrived at Boston on 14 July. She then sailed for New York, arriving the next day. Empire Cougar was a member of Convoy NG 462, which departed New York on 28 September and arrived at Guantanamo Bay on 5 October. She departed Guantanamo Bay that day with Convoy GAT 164, which arrived at Trinidad on 11 October. Empire Cougar was bound for San Pedro de Macorís, arriving on 7 October. She departed San Pedro de Macorís on 16 October for Guantanamo Bay, arriving on 18 October. She then joined Convoy GN 164, which departed Guantanamo Bay on 20 October and arrived at New York on 28 October. She then sailed to Boston, joining Convoy BX 132, which departed Boston on 29 October and arrived at Halifax on 31 October. Empire Cougar was a member of Convoy SC 160, which departed Halifax on 2 November and arrived at Liverpool on 17 November. She was carrying a cargo of sugar destined for Greenock, Renfrewshire, arriving on 16 November.

Empire Cougar departed from the Clyde on 14 December, joining Convoy ONS 38, which departed Liverpool on 13 December and arrived at Halifax on 2 January 1945. She then joined Convoy XB 140, which had departed Halifax on 1 January and arrived at Boston on 4 January. She left the convoy at Cape Cod Canal and sailed to New York, arriving on 5 January. Empire Cougar was a member of Convoy NG 484, which departed New York on 17 January and arrived at Guantanamo Bay on 23 January. She then joined Convoy GAT 186, which departed Guantanamo Bay that day and arrived at Trinidad on 29 January. She left the convoy at Cape Trujullo on 25 January, departing on 28 January for Guantanamo Bay, arriving on 30 January and departing the same day for Boca Grande, Venezuela, arriving on 2 February. Empire Cougar departed Boca Grande on 12 February and arrived at Guantanamo Bay on 16 February. She then joined Convoy GN 188, which departed Guantanamo Bay on 17 February and arrived at New York on 24 February. She departed New York on 27 February for Boston, from where she joined Convoy BX 150, which departed on 13 March and arrived at Halifax on 15 March. She then joined Convoy SC 170, which departed Halifax on 17 March and arrived at Liverpool on 31 March. Empire Cougar was carrying a cargo of sugar. She then sailed to The Mumbles, from where she joined Convoy BTC 116 on 2 April, This convoy had departed Milford Haven that day and arrived at Southend on 5 April.

Empire Cougar was a member of Convoy TBC 141, which departed Southend on 27 April and arrived at Milford Haven on 30 April. She then joined Convoy MH 99, which departed Milford Haven that day and arrived at the Clyde on 2 May. She left the convoy and sailed to Belfast, arriving on 1 May. On 3 May, Empire Cougar departed Belfast Lough as a member of Convoy ONS 49, which arrived at Halifax on 18 May. She left the convoy and sailed to Quebec City, Canada, arriving on 19 May.

=== Post-war ===
Empire Cougar departed Quebec City on 2 June 1945 for London, arriving on 18 June. She departed London on 27 August for Falmouth, Cornwall, arriving on 30 August and departing that day for Santiago de Cuba, Cuba, from where she departed on 22 September for Cienfuegos, arriving on 24 September. She then sailed to Júcaro, arriving on 28 September. Empire Cougar departed Júcaro on 4 October for Trinidad, arriving on 10 October and departing two days later for London, where she arrived on 6 November.

In 1946, Empire Cougar was sold to the Aurora Shipping Co Ltd, London. In May 1947, Aurora Shipping applied to change her name to Grancape. Whether she was renamed Grancape is unknown, but she was renamed Aurora, operating under the management of Goulandris Bros, London. In 1948, Aurora was sold to the Compagnia Maritima del Este, Panama and renamed Cougar. In 1951, she was sold to Trama Trasporti Marittimi SpA, Italy and renamed Favola. In 1959, Favola was sold to the Compagnia Comercial y Financiera Sudamericana, Panama. She was operated under the management of Compagnia Armatoriale Italiana, Italy. Favola was scrapped at La Spezia, Italy in March 1960.
