= USS Western Light =

Cargo ship of the United States Navy

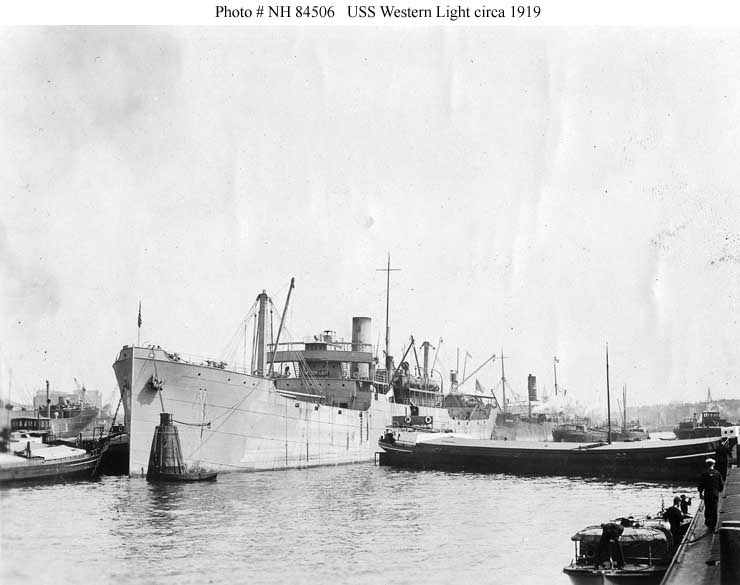
- USS Western Light (ID-3300), probably photographed while delivering a cargo of hay, flour, and oats at Rotterdam in the Netherlands between 13 and 27 April 1919.

History

United States
- Name: USS Western Light
- Builder: Northwest Steel Company, Portland, Oregon
- Launched: 27 May 1918
- Completed: 1918
- Acquired: 30 July 1918
- Commissioned: 30 July 1918
- Decommissioned: 14 May 1919
- Fate: Returned to U.S. Shipping Board 14 May 1919
- Notes: Abandoned 1933; Scrapped 1938

General characteristics
- Type: Cargo ship
- Tonnage: 5,869 Gross register tons
- Displacement: 12,185 tons
- Length: 423 ft 9 in (129.16 m)
- Beam: 54 ft 0 in (16.46 m)
- Draft: 24 ft 1 in (7.34 m) (mean)
- Depth: 29 ft 9 in (9.07 m)
- Propulsion: One 2,500-ihp (1.864-mW) steam engine, one shaft
- Speed: 10.5 knots (19.4 km/h; 12.1 mph)
- Complement: 116
- Armament: 1 × 4-inch (102-mm) gun; 1 × 3-inch (76.2mm) gun

USS Western Light (ID-3300) was a cargo ship of the United States Navy that served during World War I and its immediate aftermath.`

== Construction and acquisition ==
Western Light was laid down as the steel-hulled, single-screw commercial cargo ship SS Western Light by the Northwest Steel Company in Portland, Oregon, under a United States Shipping Board contract. After her completion in 1918, the Shipping Board transferred her to the U.S. Navy at Portland on 30 July 1918 for use during World War I. Assigning her the naval registry identification number 3300, the Navy commissioned her at Portland on 30 July 1918 as USS Western Light (ID-3300).

== Navy career ==
Western Light departed Portland in August 1918 and steamed to Arica, Chile, where she loaded a full cargo of nitrates. On 17 September 1918, she got underway, proceeded through the Panama Canal and arrived on 7 October 1918 at Philadelphia, Pennsylvania.

After discharging her cargo at Philadelphia, Western Light loaded a cargo of United States Army supplies and steamed to New York City, where she joined a convoy bound for France, departing New York on 4 November 1918. The armistice with Germany ended World War I a week later while she was still at sea. After delivering her cargo at Le Verdon-sur-Mer, France, she returned to New York in December 1918.

Carrying flour and lard, Western Light departed New York in January 1919 and steamed to Falmouth, England, where she discharged her cargo. She returned to New York in March 1919. On 30 March 1919, she departed New York with a cargo of hay, flour, and oats. Arriving at Rotterdam in the Netherlands on 13 April 1919, she unloaded her cargo there. After loading ballast, she got underway from Rotterdam on 27 April 1919 and made port at New York on 8 May 1919.

During her three U.S. Navy transatlantic voyages, Western Light delivered a total of 17,540 tons of hay, oats, flour, and lard, as well as various U.S. Army supplies.

== Decommissioning and disposal ==
Western Light was decommissioned and simultaneously transferred back to the U.S. Shipping Board on 14 May 1919.

== Later career ==
Once again SS Western Light, the ship remained in Shipping Board custody until abandoned in 1933. She was scrapped in the United Kingdom in 1938.

== Gallery ==
Photographs of USS Western Light handling cargo from one of her after holds, probably taken between 13 and 27 April 1919 while she was delivering a cargo of hay, flour, and oats at Rotterdam in the Netherlands:

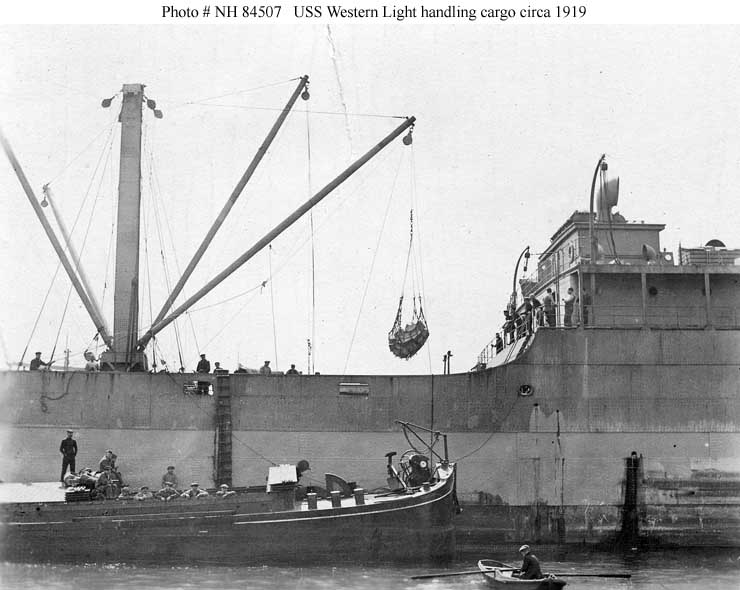

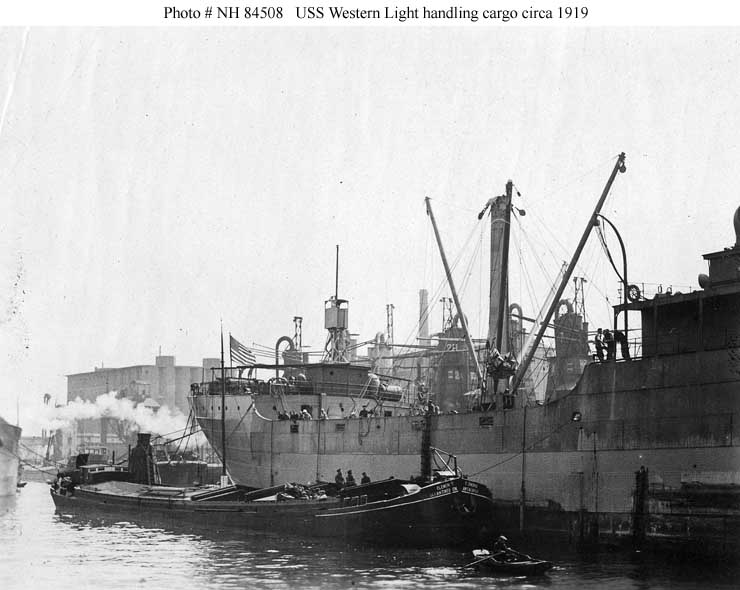
