= Oscar Schmidt Jr. =

Medal of Honor recipient

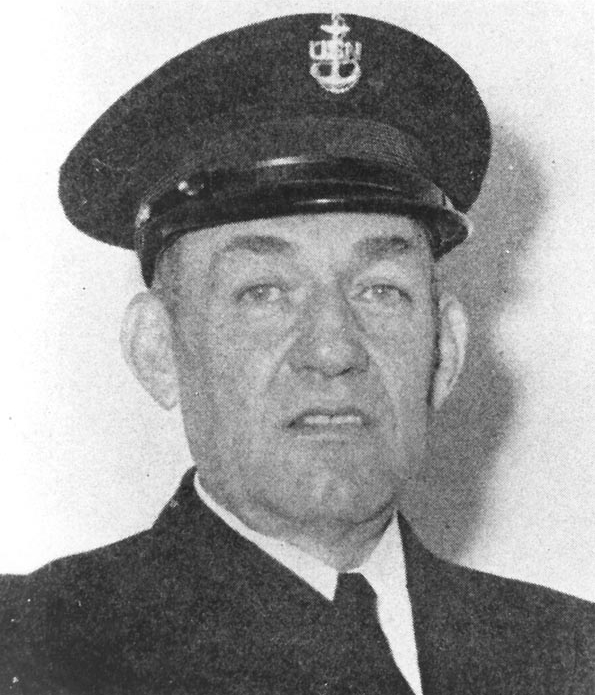
- Chief Gunner's Mate Oscar Schmidt
- Born: March 25, 1896; Philadelphia, Pennsylvania
- Died: March 24, 1973 (aged 76)
- Burial place: Arlington National Cemetery
- Military career
- Allegiance: United States of America
- Branch: United States Navy
- Service years: 1913 - 1919
- Rank: Chief Gunner's Mate
- Unit: USS Chestnut Hill (ID-2526)
- Conflicts: World War I
- Awards: Medal of Honor

Oscar Schmidt Jr. (March 25, 1896 – March 24, 1973) was a United States Navy sailor and a recipient of the United States military's highest decoration—the Medal of Honor—for his actions in World War I.

== Early life ==
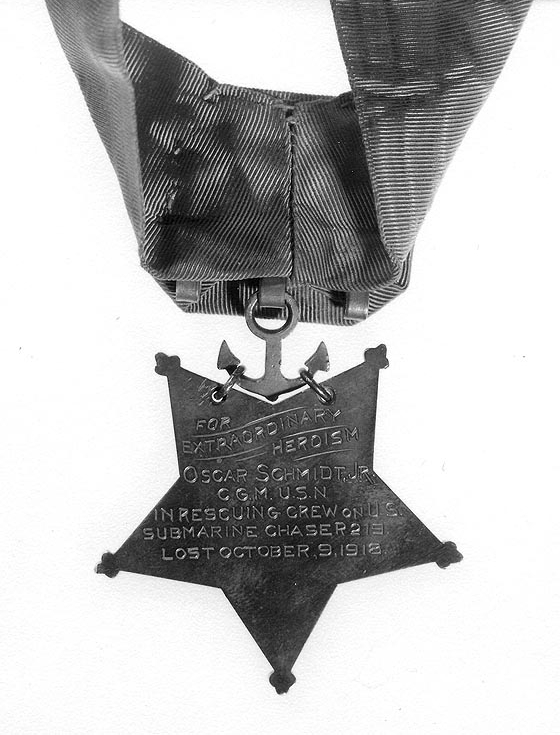
Reverse side of Schmidt's Medal of Honor

Schmidt, who was born in the Commonwealth of Pennsylvania on March 25, 1896, grew up in Philadelphia and worked in the Philadelphia Shipyard.

== Military career ==
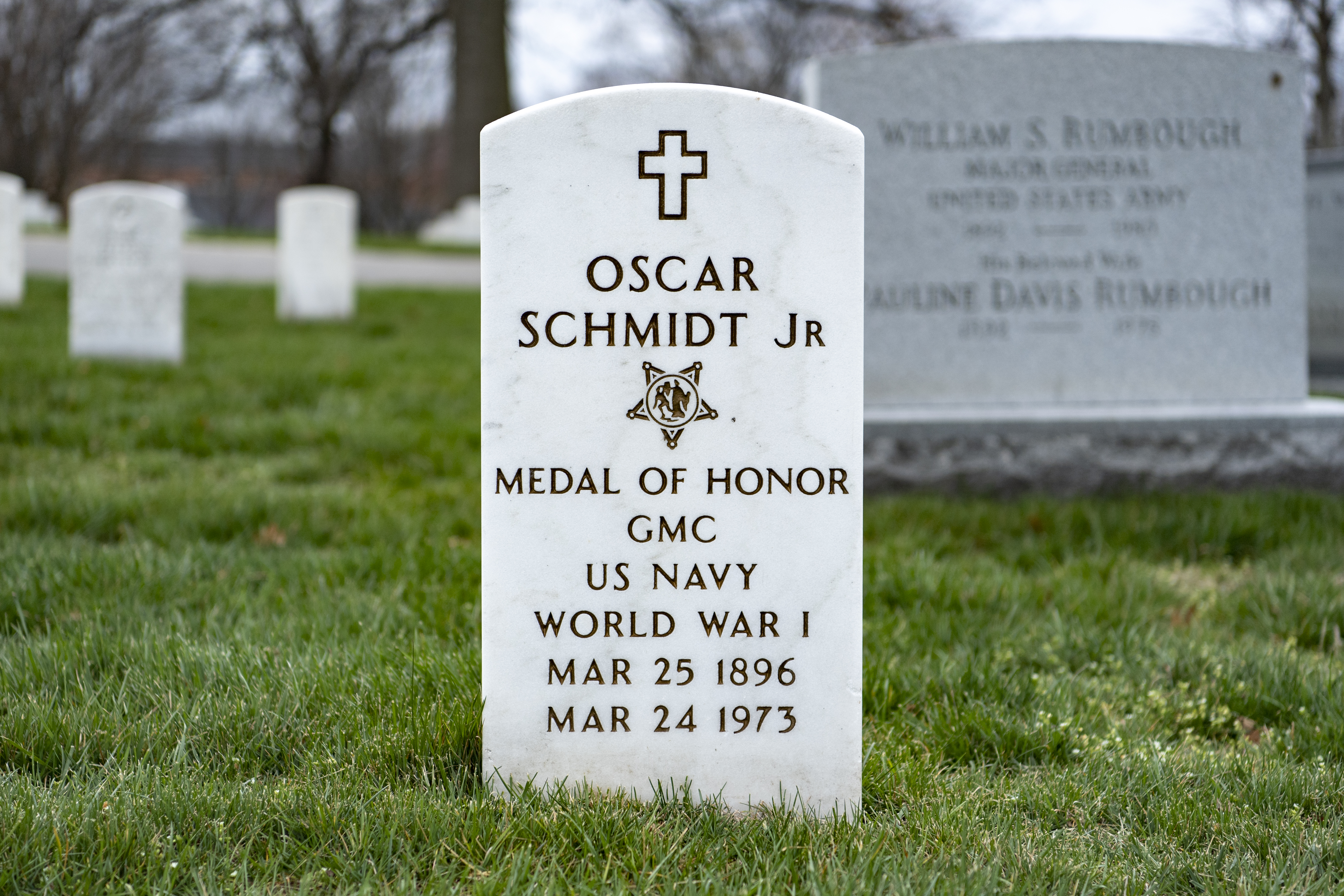
Grave at Arlington National Cemetery

Schmidt served in the U.S. Navy from 1913 until 1919. He rose to the rank of Chief Gunner's Mate.

On October 9, 1918, while a crew member on USS Chestnut Hill (ID-2526), he assisted in the rescue of crewmen from the burning submarine chaser USS SC-219 following a gasoline explosion. For this act, he was awarded the Medal of Honor.

== Medal of Honor citation ==
Rank and organization: Chief Gunner's Mate, U.S. Navy. Place and date: At sea, October 9, 1918. Entered service at: Pennsylvania. Born: March 25, 1896, Philadelphia, Pa. G.O. No.: 450, 1919.

Citation:

For gallant conduct and extraordinary heroism while attached to the U.S.S. Chestnut Hill, on the occasion of the explosion and subsequent fire on board the U.S. submarine chaser 219. Schmidt, seeing a man, whose legs were partly blown off, hanging on a line from the bow of the 219, jumped overboard, swam to the sub chaser and carried him from the bow to the stern where a member of the 219's crew helped him land the man on the afterdeck of the submarine. Schmidt then endeavored to pass through the flames amidships to get another man who was seriously burned. This he was unable to do, but when the injured man fell overboard and drifted to the stern of the chaser Schmidt helped him aboard.

== Death and legacy ==
Schmidt died on March 24, 1973, the day before his 77th birthday, and was buried at Arlington National Cemetery in Arlington County, Virginia.

== See also ==
- List of Medal of Honor recipients
- List of Medal of Honor recipients for World War I
