= SS Minnedosa =

One of a pair of British transatlantic steam ocean liners

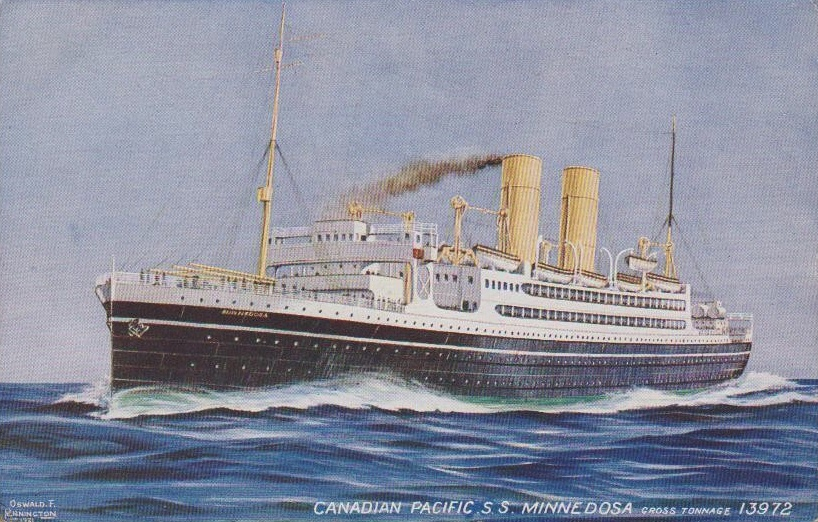
- Minnedosa in 1921

History
- Name: 1917: Minnedosa; 1935: Piemonte
- Namesake: 1935: Piedmont
- Owner: 1918: CP Railway Ocean Lines; 1921: Canadian Pacific Railway; 1935: Flotte Riuniti Cosulich-Lloyd Sabaudo; 1936: Lloyd Triestino
- Operator: 1918: CP Ocean Services Ltd; 1921: CP SS Lines Ltd
- Port of registry: 1918: (United Kingdom) Belfast; 1935: (Kingdom of Italy) Genoa
- Builder: Barclay, Curle & Co & Harland & Wolff
- Yard number: 518; 464
- Laid down: 1913
- Launched: 17 October 1917
- Completed: August 1918
- Reclassified: 1935: troop ship
- Refit: 1925: R&W Hawthorn, Leslie & Co, Hebburn
- Identification: UK official number 142717; code letters JVTF (until 1933); call sign GISP (1934–35); call sign IBLL (1935 onward)
- Fate: torpedoed and refloated 1942, bombed and scuttled 1943, raised and scrapped 1949

General characteristics
- Type: ocean liner
- Tonnage: 1919: 13,972 GRT, 8,521 NRT; 1927: 15,186 GRT, 8,912 NRT
- Length: 520.0 ft (158.5 m)
- Beam: 67.2 ft (20.5 m)
- Draught: 34 ft 4 in (10.46 m)
- Depth: 41.8 ft (12.7 m)
- Decks: 4
- Installed power: 2 × triple-expansion engines; 1 × exhaust steam turbine
- Propulsion: 3 × screws
- Speed: 16 1/2 knots (30.6 km/h)
- Capacity: 550 cabin class; 1,200 third class; 37,460 cu ft (1,061 m^{3}) refrigerated cargo space
- Notes: sister ship: Melita

SS Minnedosa was one of a pair of transatlantic steam ocean liners that were built in the United Kingdom, launched in 1917 and operated by Canadian Pacific until 1935. Her sister ship was Melita.

In 1935 Flotte Riuniti Cosulich-Lloyd Sabaudo obtained both ships, renamed them, and converted them into troop ships for the Italian government. Minnedosa was renamed Piemonte, and in 1936 passed to Lloyd Triestino.

In 1942, a Royal Navy submarine torpedoed Piemonte, but she was beached and refloated. In 1943, she was damaged in an Allied air raid and then scuttled. In 1949 she was raised and scrapped.

== Building ==
In 1913, Hamburg America Line ordered a pair of liners from Barclay, Curle & Co. Due to the outbreak of the First World War, Canadian Pacific (CP) bought the two partly built ships and had them completed to its specification.

Barclay, Curle & Co had laid down one of the ships as Medora. CP renamed her Minnedosa. She was built in Glasgow as yard number 518, and launched her on 17 October 1917. She was then towed to Belfast, where Harland & Wolff installed her engines. Her Harland & Wolff yard number was 464.

Minnedosa had three screws. A pair of four-cylinder triple-expansion steam engines drove her port and starboard screws. Exhaust steam from their low-pressure cylinders powered a low-pressure steam turbine that drove her middle screw. Between them, her three engines gave her a top speed of 16 1/2 knots (30.6 km/h) and cruising speed of 15 knots (28 km/h).

Minnedosa's registered length was 520 ft (160 m), her beam was 67.2 ft (20.5 m) and her depth was 50.3 ft (15.3 m). Her holds included 37,460 cubic feet (1,061 m^{3}) of refrigerated space. As built, her tonnages were 13,972 GRT and 8,521 NRT.

Minnedosa was at first fitted out as a troopship. CP took delivery of her on 21 November 1918.

== Minnedosa ==
On 5 December 1918, Minnedosa began her maiden voyage from Liverpool to St John, New Brunswick, repatriating troops of the Canadian Expeditionary Force. After trooping duties, Minnedosa began civilian service between Liverpool and Canada. From 1922 to 1927 her route was between Antwerp and St John via Southampton. In 1925 R&W Hawthorn, Leslie & Co refitted her in Hebburn, which increased her tonnages to 15,186 GRT and 8,912 NRT. For a period in the 1920s Minnedosa's Master was Captain Ronald Stuart, VC, which entitled her to fly the Blue Ensign.

In 1927, CP put Minnedosa on its route between Britain, Quebec and Montreal. In 1931 she was laid up after having crossed the North Atlantic 129 times. In 1935 CP sold Melita and Minnedosa to breakers in Italy.

== Italian service ==
The sale contract specified that the two ships must be broken up. This clause was breached when the pair were passed to Flotte Riuniti Cosulich-Lloyd Sabaudo, who had them refitted as troop ships for the Italian Government. Minnedosa was renamed Piemonte. She carried troops in the Second Italo-Ethiopian War. In 1936 she was transferred to Lloyd Triestino, which in 1938 put her on its Far East service.

On 17 November 1942, the submarine HMS Umbra torpedoed Piemonte off Capo Rasocolmo in the Mediterranean. She was beached to prevent her sinking, then refloated on 28 December and towed to Messina. In May 1943 Allied aircraft bombed Piemonte in Messina, capsizing her in shallow water. On 15 August, she was scuttled in Messina.

In 1949, Piedmont's wreck was raised. She was towed to La Spezia, where she arrived on 24 July to be scrapped.

== Bibliography ==
- Dunn, Laurence (1964). Famous Liners of the Past Belfast Built. London: Adlard Coles.
- Harnack, Edwin P (1930) [1903]. All About Ships & Shipping (3rd ed.). London: Faber and Faber.
- "List of vessels fitted with refrigerating appliances". Lloyd's Register (PDF). Vol. I. Steamers and Motorships under 300 tons. Lloyd's Register. 1930 – via Southampton City Council.
- Lloyd's Register (PDF). Vol. II. Steamers & Motorships of 300 tons and over. Lloyd's Register. 1930 – via Southampton City Council.
- Lloyd's Register (PDF). Vol. II. Steamers & Motorships of 300 tons gross and over. Lloyd's Register. 1934 – via Southampton City Council.
- Lloyd's Register (PDF). Vol. II. Steamers & Motorships over 300 tons. Lloyd's Register. 1935 – via Southampton City Council.
- Lloyd's Register (PDF). Vol. II. Steamers & Motorships over 300 tons. Lloyd's Register. 1936 – via Southampton City Council.
- Registrar General of Shipping and Seamen (1919). Mercantile Navy List. Board of Trade – via Crew List Index Project.
- Registrar General of Shipping and Seamen (1927). Mercantile Navy List. Board of Trade – via Crew List Index Project.
- Rohwer, Jürgen; Hümmelchen, Gerhard. "Seekrieg 1942, November". Württembergische Landesbibliothek Stuttgart (in German).
- Wilson, RM (1956). The Big Ships. London: Cassell & Co.
