= SS Melita =

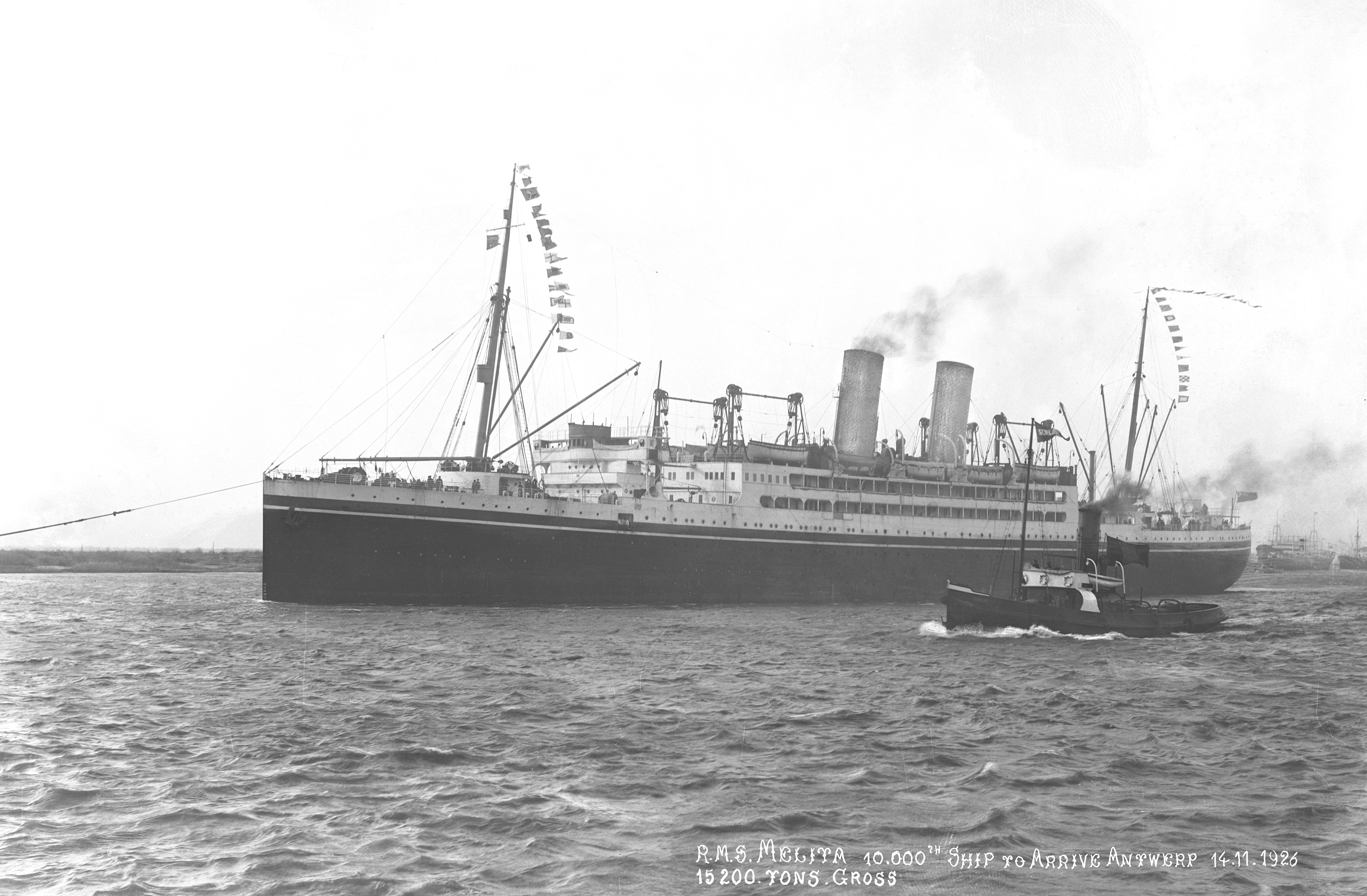
- Melita in the Scheldt in 1926

History
- Name: 1917: Melita; 1935: Liguria
- Namesake: 1935: Liguria
- Owner: 1918: CP Railway Ocean Lines; 1921: Canadian Pacific Railway; 1935: Flotte Riuniti Cosulich-Lloyd Sabaudo; 1936: Lloyd Triestino
- Operator: 1918: CP Ocean Services Ltd; 1921: CP SS Lines Ltd
- Port of registry: 1918: (United Kingdom) Belfast; 1935: (Kingdom of Italy) Genoa
- Builder: Barclay, Curle & Co & Harland & Wolff
- Yard number: 517, 463
- Laid down: 1913
- Launched: 21 April 1917
- Completed: 12 January 1918
- Maiden voyage: Liverpool to St John, NB
- Reclassified: 1935: troop ship
- Refit: 1925: Palmers, Jarrow
- Identification: UK official number 136367; code letters JRVC (until 1933); call sign GMLR (1934–35); call sign IBOQ (1935 onward)
- Fate: Sunk 1940, raised 1941, scrapped 1950

General characteristics
- Type: Ocean liner
- Tonnage: 1918: 13,967 GRT, 8,526 NRT; 1927: 15,183 GRT, 9,973 NRT
- Length: 520 ft (160 m)
- Beam: 67.2 ft (20.5 m)
- Draught: 34 ft 4 in (10.46 m)
- Depth: 50.3 ft (15.3 m)
- Decks: 3
- Installed power: 2 × triple-expansion engines; 1 × exhaust steam turbine
- Propulsion: 3 × screws
- Speed: 16 1/2 knots (30.6 km/h)
- Capacity: 550 cabin class; 1,200 third class; 37,460 cu ft (1,061 m^{3}) refrigerated cargo space
- Notes: sister ship: Minnedosa

SS Melita was one of a pair of transatlantic steam ocean liners that were built in the United Kingdom, launched in 1917 and operated by Canadian Pacific until 1935. Her sister ship was Minnedosa.

In 1935 Flotte Riuniti Cosulich-Lloyd Sabaudo obtained both ships, renamed them, and converted them into troop ships for the Italian government. Melita was renamed Liguria, and in 1936 passed to Lloyd Triestino.

In 1940 a British aircraft torpedoed Liguria in the Mediterranean. In 1941 Italian forces scuttled her at Tobruk. Her wreck was raised, and in 1950 it was scrapped.

== Building ==
In 1913 Hamburg America Line ordered a pair of liners from Barclay, Curle & Co. During that war Canadian Pacific (CP) bought the two partly built ships and had them completed to its specification.

Barclay, Curle & Co built Melita in Glasgow as yard number 517 and launched her on 24 April 1917. She was then towed to Belfast where Harland & Wolff installed her engines. Her Harland & Wolff yard number was 463.

Melita had three screws. A pair of four-cylinder triple-expansion steam engines drove her port and starboard screws. Exhaust steam from their low-pressure cylinders powered a low-pressure steam turbine that drove her middle screw. Between them the three engines gave her a top speed of 16 1/2 knots (30.6 km/h) and cruising speed of 15 knots (28 km/h).

Melita's registered length was 520 ft (160 m), her beam was 67.2 ft (20.5 m) and her depth was 50.3 ft (15.3 m). Her holds included 37,460 cubic feet (1,061 m^{3}) of refrigerated space. As built, her tonnages were 13,967 GRT and 8,526 NRT.

Just before the First World War, CP was developing the idea of cabin class to replace both first and second class. Accordingly, it had Melita and Minnedosa fitted out with only two classes of passenger accommodation. Melita had berths for 550 passengers in cabin class and 1,200 in third class.

== Melita ==
CP took delivery of Melita on 12 January 1918. Her maiden voyage was from Liverpool to St John, New Brunswick, but her regular route was between Liverpool and New York.

By the summer of 1918, Melita was a troopship, taking men from New York to Europe. After the Armistice of 11 November 1918 she repatriated US and Canadian troops from France. In war service, she carried 12,583 troops and passengers. Altogether, Canadian Pacific ships carried more than a million troops and passengers, and carried more than four million tons of cargo and munitions.

In 1919, the UK Government chartered her for one voyage from Glasgow to Bombay.

In 1920, Melita was overhauled in Antwerp. From 1922 to 1927, her route was between Antwerp and St John via Southampton. In 1925 Palmers Shipbuilding and Iron Company refitted her in Jarrow. The refit increased her tonnages to 15,183 GRT and 9,973 NRT.

In 1927, CP put Melita on its route between Britain, Quebec and Montreal. In 1932, Melita made her final transatlantic crossing, which was from Liverpool, Belfast and Greenock to Halifax, Nova Scotia and St John. She had crossed the North Atlantic 146 times.

From 1932 Melita was laid up, but then CP then used her for a series of cruises from Glasgow. In 1935, CP sold Melita and Minnedosa to breakers in Italy.

=== Murder of Captain Clews ===
In the early hours of 21 October 1925 Melita was in port in Antwerp when her Chief Officer, Thomas Towers, shot dead her Master, AH Clews, as the latter slept in his cabin. Towers also shot the Assistant Chief Engineer, David Gilmour, in the head, but without killing him. Other officers then overpowered Towers, but in the struggle he twice shot the Second Engineer, John Holliday, in the chest. Towers tried to shoot himself in the head, but failed.

Belgian police arrested Towers, who blamed Clews and others for "trying to wreck his career". The police then put him back aboard to be surrendered to British police. Gilmour and Holliday were initially treated in hospital in Antwerp, where one of the bullets was removed from Holliday's lung. The next day Melita reached Southampton, where a police launch put a surgeon aboard to treat Gilmour and Holliday, and Towers was removed under arrest.

Captain Clews was the nephew of the banker Henry Clews (1834–1923). Towers was found insane and detained at His Majesty's pleasure in Broadmoor Hospital.

== Liguria ==
The sale contract specified that the two ships must be broken up. This clause was breached when the pair were passed to Flotte Riuniti Cosulich-Lloyd Sabaudo, who had them refitted as troop ships for the Italian Government. Melita was renamed Liguria. In 1936 she was transferred to Lloyd Triestino.

On 5 July 1940 a British aircraft torpedoed Melita in the Mediterranean, but she stayed afloat and reached port in Tobruk. When British and Australian forces captured Tobruk the retreating Italians scuttled Melita in the approach to Tobruk harbour on 22 January 1941.

Melita was later refloated. In 1950 her wreck was towed to Savona, where she arrived on 31 August to be scrapped.

== Bibliography ==
- Harnack, Edwin P (1930) [1903]. All About Ships & Shipping (3rd ed.). London: Faber and Faber.
- "List of vessels fitted with refrigerating appliances". Lloyd's Register (PDF). Vol. I. Steamers and Motorships under 300 tons. Lloyd's Register. 1930 – via Southampton City Council.
- Lloyd's Register (PDF). Vol. II. Steamers and Motorships of 300 tons gross and over. Lloyd's Register. 1930 – via Southampton City Council.
- Lloyd's Register (PDF). Vol. II. Steamers & Motorships of 300 tons gross and over. Lloyd's Register. 1934 – via Southampton City Council.
- Lloyd's Register (PDF). Vol. II. Steamers & Motorships over 300 tons. Lloyd's Register. 1935 – via Southampton City Council.
- Lloyd's Register (PDF). Vol. II. Steamers & Motorships over 300 tons. Lloyd's Register. 1936 – via Southampton City Council.
- Registrar General of Shipping and Seamen (1927). Mercantile Navy List. Board of Trade. p. 351 – via Crew List Index Project.
- Wilson, RM (1956). The Big Ships. London: Cassell & Co.
