= USS Western Spirit =

Cargo ship of the United States Navy

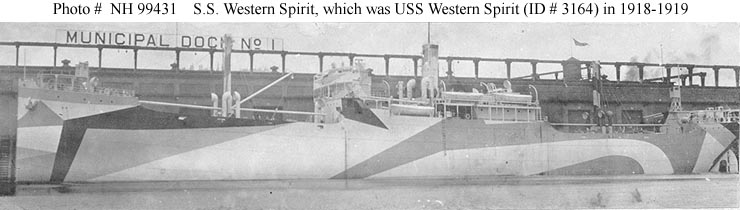
- SS Western Spirit, probably in Portland, Oregon, in July 1918 just after her completion by the Northwest Steel Company. She is painted in pattern camouflage.

History

United States
- Name: USS Western Spirit
- Builder: Northwest Steel Company, Portland, Oregon
- Launched: 6 May 1918
- Completed: mid-July 1918
- Acquired: 19 July 1918
- Commissioned: 30 July 1918
- Decommissioned: 17 April 1919
- Fate: Returned to U.S. Shipping Board 17 April 1919
- Notes: Abandoned 1933

General characteristics
- Type: Cargo ship
- Tonnage: 5,730 Gross register tons
- Displacement: 12,185 tons
- Length: 423 ft 9 in (129.16 m)
- Beam: 54 ft 0 in (16.46 m)
- Draft: 24 ft 0.5 in (7.328 m) (mean)
- Depth: 29 ft 9 in (9.07 m)
- Propulsion: One 2,500-ihp (1.864-mW) steam engine, one shaft
- Speed: 10.5 knots (19.4 km/h; 12.1 mph)
- Complement: 98
- Armament: 1 × 4-inch (102-mm) gun; 1 × 3-inch (76.2mm) gun

USS Western Spirit (ID-3164) was a cargo ship of the United States Navy that served during World War I and its immediate aftermath.`

== Construction and acquisition ==
Western Spirit was laid down as the steel-hulled, single-screw commercial cargo ship SS Western Spirit by the Northwest Steel Company in Portland, Oregon, under a United States Shipping Board contract. She was launched on 6 May 1918 and completed in mid-July 1918. The Shipping Board transferred her to the U.S. Navy on 19 July 1918 for use during World War I. The Navy assigned her the naval registry identification number 3164 and commissioned her at Portland on 30 July 1918 as USS Western Spirit (ID-3164).

== Navy career ==
Assigned to the Naval Overseas Transportation Service, Western Spirit departed Portland on 26 July 1918 and steamed to Arica, Chile, where she loaded a cargo of nitrates. She then made a voyage via the Panama Canal to New Orleans, Louisiana, arriving there on 11 September 1918. After unloading the nitrates, she departed New Orleans on 23 September 1918 and proceeded to Norfolk, Virginia, where she took on a load of some 4,000 tons of general United States Army supplies. On 13 October 1918, she got underway from Norfolk for New York City.

At New York, Western Spirit joined a convoy and departed on 16 October 1918 bound for France, but suffered engine trouble and had to divert to Halifax, Nova Scotia, Canada, for repairs. She departed Halifax on 2 November 1918 to continue her voyage. Nine days later, the armistice with Germany brought World War I to an end while she was still at sea.

Western Spirit arrived at Le Verdon-sur-Mer, France, on 20 November 1918, discharged her cargo, took on a cargo of U.S. Army equipment, and got underway for the return voyage to the United States on 13 December 1918. She arrived at Norfolk on 7 January 1919.

Western Spirit departed Norfolk on 19 January 1919 for a second transatlantic voyage, carrying railroad supplies and a cargo of goods consigned to the U.S.Army Quartermaster Corps. She arrived at La Pallice, France, on 10 March 1919 and discharged her cargo. On 23 March 1919, she began her return voyage, reaching Norfolk on 11 April 1919.

== Decommissioning and disposal ==
Western Spirit was decommissioned and simultaneously transferred back to the U.S. Shipping Board on 17 April 1919.

== Later career ==
Once again SS Western Spirit, the ship remained in Shipping Board custody until abandoned due to age and deterioration in 1933.

== Gallery ==
Photographs of SS Western Spirit taken ca. mid-July 1918 at Portland, Oregon, apparently sometime just after her completion by the Northwestern Steel Company and before her commissioning into the U.S. Navy on 30 July 1918. She is painted in pattern camouflage:

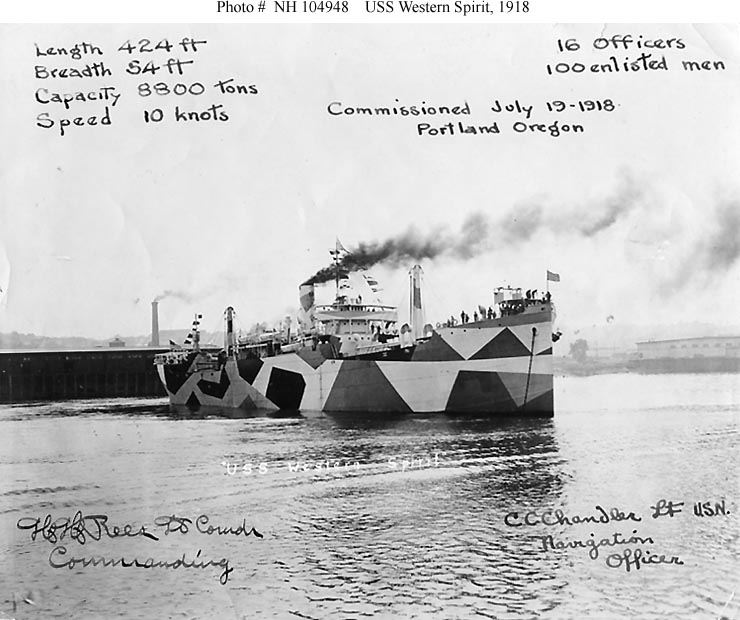

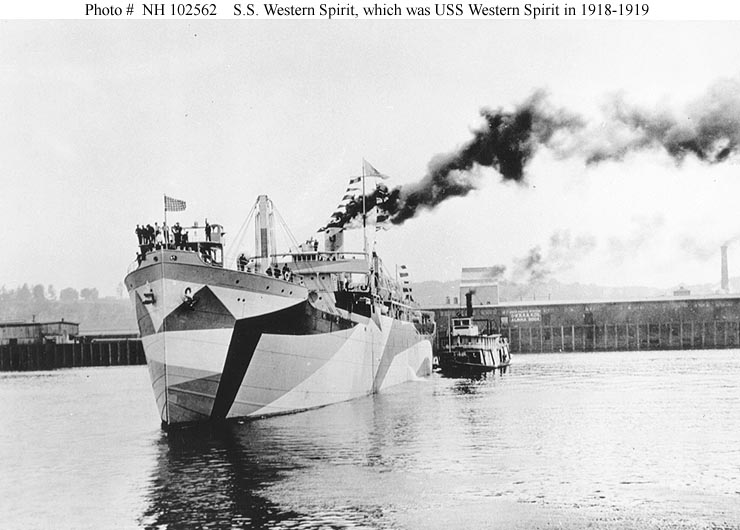
