= Japanese submarine Ro-11 =

Imperial Japanese Navy Kaichū-type submarine

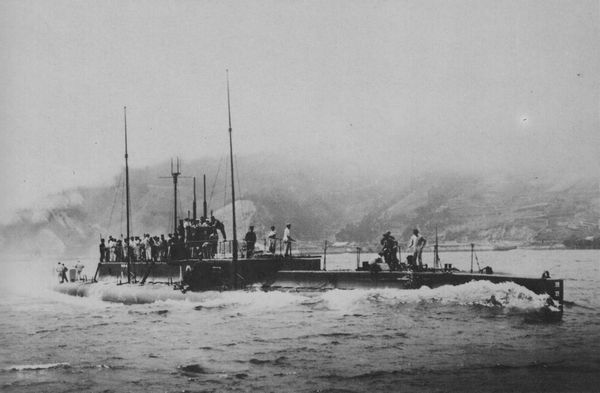
- Submarine No. 19 underway in Hiroshima Bay in the spring of 1919. She was renamed Ro-11 on 1 November 1924.

History

Japan
- Name: Submarine No. 19
- Builder: Kure Naval Arsenal, Kure, Japan
- Laid down: 25 April 1917
- Launched: 15 October 1917
- Completed: 31 July 1919
- Commissioned: 31 July 1919
- Renamed: Ro-11 on 1 November 1924
- Stricken: 1 April 1932
- Renamed: Haisen No. 1 on 1 April 1932

General characteristics
- Class & type: Kaichū type submarine (K1 subclass)
- Displacement: 732 tonnes (720 long tons) surfaced; 1,016 tonnes (1,000 long tons) submerged
- Length: 69.19 m (227 ft 0 in) overall
- Beam: 6.35 m (20 ft 10 in)
- Draft: 3.43 m (11 ft 3 in)
- Installed power: 2,900 bhp (2,200 kW) (diesel); 1,200 hp (890 kW) (electric motor)
- Propulsion: Diesel-electric; 2 × Sulzer Mark II diesel engine, 75 tons fuel; 2 × electric motor; 2 x shafts
- Speed: 18.2 knots (33.7 km/h; 20.9 mph) surfaced; 9.1 knots (16.9 km/h; 10.5 mph) submerged
- Range: 4,000 nmi (7,400 km; 4,600 mi) at 10 knots (19 km/h; 12 mph) surfaced; 85 nmi (157 km; 98 mi) at 4 knots (7.4 km/h; 4.6 mph) submerged
- Test depth: 30 m (98 ft)
- Crew: 43
- Armament: 6 × 450 mm (18 in) torpedo tubes (4 x bow, 2 x external in trainable turret); 10 x Type 44 torpedoes; 1 × 76.2 mm (3.00 in) gun

Ro-11, originally named Submarine No. 19, was an Imperial Japanese Navy Kaichū-Type submarine of the Kaichū I subclass. She and her sister ship Ro-12 were the first submarines built to a fully Japanese design. She was commissioned in 1919 and operated in the waters of Japan. She was stricken in 1932.

== Design and description ==
The Kaichu-type submarines were the first submarines built to Japanese requirements and designed specifically for service in the waters of East Asia and the Pacific Ocean. Unlike European submarines, which could lie on the bottom in the shallow waters of the North Sea and the Mediterranean Sea, Japanese submarines needed superior depth control while operating in the deep waters of the Pacific. They also required stronger hulls than their European counterparts because of the tendency of the Pacific′s more powerful and unpredictable currents to disrupt a submerged submarine′s trim and force her below her intended operating depth. The Kaichu type thus were broader in beam in proportion to their length than European submarines of the period and had a greater amount of internal compartmentation and more bulkheads than was common in other submarines, resulting in more cramped and uncomfortable conditions for their crews but a hull strength that purportedly allowed them to survive collisions, groundings, and overly deep dives that would have destroyed European submarines. In 1921, at least some naval analysts claimed that the Kaichu type′s hull strength gave it a greater chance of surviving a depth-charge attack than any other existing submarine class.

The submarines of the Kaichu I subclass displaced 732 tonnes (720 long tons) surfaced and 1,016 tonnes (1,000 long tons) submerged. The submarines were 69.19 meters (227 ft 0 in) long and had a beam of 6.35 meters (20 ft 10 in) and a draft of 3.43 meters (11 ft 3 in). They had a diving depth of 30 meters (98 ft). For surface running, the submarines were powered by two 1,450-brake-horsepower (1,081 kW) Sulzer Mark II diesel engines, each driving one propeller shaft. When submerged each propeller was driven by a 600-horsepower (447 kW) electric motor. They could reach 18.2 knots (34 km/h; 21 mph) on the surface and 9.1 knots (16.9 km/h; 10.5 mph) underwater. On the surface, they had a range of 4,000 nautical miles (7,400 km; 4,600 mi) at 10 knots (19 km/h; 12 mph); submerged, they had a range of 85 nmi (157 km; 98 mi) at 4 knots (7.4 km/h; 4.6 mph).

The submarines were armed with six 450 mm (18 in) torpedo tubes, four internal tubes in the bow and two external tubes in a trainable turret mounted on the upper deck, and carried a total of ten Type 44 torpedoes. They were also armed with a single 76.2 mm (3.00 in) deck gun mounted aft of the conning tower.

== Construction and commissioning ==
Ro-11 was laid down as Submarine No. 19 on 25 April 1917 by the Kure Naval Arsenal at Kure, Japan. Launched on 15 October 1917, she was completed and commissioned on 31 July 1919.

== Service history ==
Upon commissioning, Submarine No. 19 was attached to the Kure Naval District and was assigned to Submarine Division 12 in the Kure Defense Division. She was transferred to Submarine Division 14 on 18 September 1919, but continued her service in the Kure Defense Division. On 1 November 1919, Submarine Division 14 was reassigned to Submarine Squadron 1 in the 1st Fleet. During maneuvers in 1919, Submarine No. 19 collided with her sister ship Submarine No. 20, and both submarines suffered serious damage, but they made it back to port for repairs. After commissioning, Submarine No. 19 began to experience chronic diesel engine problems, and during 1921 engine trouble prevented her from successfully carrying out a training cruise to Formosa.

Submarine Division 14 was assigned to the Kure Defense Division and Kure Naval District on 1 July 1921, then to Submarine Squadron 2 in the 2nd Fleet on 1 December 1922. On 4 June 1923, Submarine No. 19 was transferred to Submarine Division 3 and attached to the Yokosuka Naval District, in both of which she remained for the rest of her active career. On 1 December 1923, Submarine Division 3 was assigned to duty in the Yokosuka Defense Division, an assignment which also continued through the end of Submarine No. 19′s career. She was renamed Ro-11 on 1 November 1924.

Ro-11 was stricken from the Navy list on 1 April 1932. She was renamed Haisen No. 1 that day.
