= Shipping Controller =

Shipping Controller of Ministry of Shipping
- Appointer: Lloyd George Coalition Government
- Constituting instrument: New Ministries and Secretaries Act 1916
- Formation: 10 December 1916
- First holder: Sir Joseph Maclay
- Final holder: Lord Pirrie
- Abolished: 1921

Shipping Controller was a post created by the Lloyd George Coalition Government in 1916 under the New Ministries and Secretaries Act (6 & 7 George 5 c.68) to regulate and organize merchant shipping in order to supply the United Kingdom with the materials to fight the war following severe losses.

== Shipping Controllers ==
The first Shipping Controller was Sir Joseph Maclay, later Baron Maclay, who was appointed on 10 December 1916.

The second Shipping Controller was Lord Pirrie from 1918.

== See also ==
- Minister of Shipping
