= List of ship launches in 1918 =

The list of ship launches in 1918 includes a chronological list of ships launched in 1918. In cases where no official launching ceremony was held, the date built or completed may be used instead.

== January ==
Date	Ship	Class	Builder	Location	Country	Notes
3 January	United States	J. F. Duthie & Company	Seattle, Washington	Western King	Cargo ship	Requisitioned by United States Shipping Board.
9 January	Germany	Germaniawerft	Kiel	U-141	Type U-139 submarine	For Imperial German Navy.
10 January	United States	Great Lakes Engineering Works	Ecorse, Michigan	Lake Houghton	Cargo ship	Requisitioned by United States Shipping Board
12 January	United Kingdom	Richardson, Duck & Company		Kenilworth	Cargo ship	For Dalgliesh Steam Shipping Co.
12 January	United States	William Cramp & Sons	Philadelphia, Pennsylvania	Santa Olivia	Cargo ship	Requisitioned by United States Shipping Board.
13 January	United States	Columbia River Shipbuilding		Santiam	Cargo ship	Requisitioned by United States Shipping Board.
13 January	United States	Fore River Shipbuilding	Quincy, Massachusetts	Stevens	Wickes-class destroyer	For United States Navy.
13 January	United States	Northwest Steel	Portland, Oregon	War Archer	Cargo ship	Requisitioned by United States Shipping Board.
13 January	United States	Ames Shipbuilding and Dry Dock Company	Seattle, Washington	Westwood	Cargo ship	Requisitioned by United States Shipping Board.
14 January	United States	American Shipbuilding Company	Lorain, Ohio	Lake Charles	Cargo ship	Requisitioned by United States Shipping Board.
14 January	United States	Los Angeles Shipbuilding and Dry Dock Company	San Pedro, California	Wakulla	Design 1013 ship	For United States Shipping Board.
17 January	United Kingdom	Harland & Wolff	Belfast	Cavendish	Seaplane carrier	For Royal Navy.
19 January	United States	American Shipbuilding Company	Wyandotte, Michigan	Lake Butler	Cargo ship	Requisitioned by United States Shipping Board.
19 January	United States	American Shipbuilding Company	Superior, Wisconsin	Lake Capens	Cargo ship	Requisitioned by United States Shipping Board.
19 January	United States	Seattle Construction and Dry Dock Company	Seattle, Washington	Southerland or Sutherland	Cargo ship	Requisitioned by United States Shipping Board.
19 January	United States	Skinner & Eddy	Seattle, Washington	West Arrow	Cargo ship	Requisitioned by United States Shipping Board.
26 January	United Kingdom	John Brown & Company	Clydebank	Simoom	S-class destroyer	
26 January	Germany	Blohm & Voss	Hamburg	U-123	Type UE II submarine	For Imperial German Navy
27 January	United States	Fore River Shipbuilding	Quincy, Massachusetts	Gregory	Wickes-class destroyer	For United States Navy.
27 January	United States	Moore Dry Dock Company	Oakland, California	Pasadena	Cargo ship	Requisitioned by United States Shipping Board.
27 January	United States	Columbia River Shipbuilding	Portland, Oregon	West Gate	Cargo ship	Requisitioned by United States Shipping Board.
28 January	Germany	AG Weser	Bremen	Leipzig	Cöln-class cruiser	For Imperial German Navy.
31 January	United States	American Shipbuilding Company	Chicago, Illinois	Lake Crescent	Cargo ship	Requisitioned by United States Shipping Board.
31 January	United States	Ames Shipbuilding and Dry Dock Company	Seattle, Washington	West Eagle	Cargo ship	Requisitioned by United States Shipping Board.

== February ==
Date	Ship	Class	Builder	Location	Country	Notes
2 February	United States	American Shipbuilding Company	Lorain, Ohio	Lake Jessup	Cargo ship	Requisitioned by United States Shipping Board.
2 February	United States	Great Lakes Engineering Works	Ashtabula, Ohio	Lake Maurepas	Cargo ship	Requisitioned by United States Shipping Board.
2 February	United States	Sun Shipbuilding Company	Chester, Pennsylvania	Sabine Sun	Tanker	Requisitioned by United States Shipping Board.
8 February	United States	Northwest Steel	Portland, Oregon	Westhampton	Cargo ship	Requisitioned by United States Shipping Board.
9 February	United States	Skinner & Eddy	Seattle, Washington	West Lake	Cargo ship	Requisitioned by United States Shipping Board.
10 February	United States	Bethlehem Alameda	Alameda, California	Paul H. Harwood	Tanker	For United States Shipping Board.
11 February	United Kingdom	Irvine's Shipbuilding & Dry Docks Co, Ltd.	West Hartlepool	Manchester Brigade	Cargo ship	For Manchester Liners Ltd.
11 February	United States	Baltimore Dry Dock and Shipbuilding Company	Baltimore, Maryland	Polar Sea	Refrigerated cargo ship	Requisitioned by United States Shipping Board.
11 February	United States	Long Beach Shipbuilding Company	Long Beach, California	Silverado	Cargo ship	Requisitioned by United States Shipping Board.
12 February	United Kingdom	Craig, Taylor & Co, Ltd.	Stockton-on-Tees	Maindy Dene	Cargo ship	For Maindy Shipping Company.
12 February	United States	New York Shipbuilding	Camden, New Jersey	Sewall's Point	Cargo ship	Requisitioned by United States Shipping Board.
13 February	United Kingdom	Blyth Shipbuilding & Dry Docks Co. Ltd	Blyth	War Barrage	Cargo ship	For British Shipping Controller.
14 February	United Kingdom	Harland & Wolff	Govan	Coney	Coaster	For G. & J. Burns Ltd.
14 February	United States	Mare Island Navy Yard	Vallejo, California	Taylor	Wickes-class destroyer	For United States Navy.
14 February	United Kingdom	Harland & Wolff	Belfast	War Viper	B-type cargo ship	For British Shipping Controller.
16 February	United States	American Shipbuilding Company	Wyandotte, Michigan	Lake Arthur	Cargo ship	Requisitioned by United States Shipping Board.
16 February	United States	Great Lakes Engineering Works	Ecorse, Michigan	Lake Owens	Cargo ship	Requisitioned by United States Shipping Board.
16 February	United States	Great Lakes Engineering Works	Ecorse, Michigan	Lake Winona	Cargo ship	Requisitioned by United States Shipping Board.
17 February	United States	Bethlehem Wilmington	Wilmington, Delaware	Guarro	Cargo ship	Requisitioned by United States Shipping Board.
17 February	United States	J. F. Duthie & Company	Seattle, Washington	Westover	Cargo ship	Requisitioned by United States Shipping Board.
19 February	United States	Staten Island Shipbuilding Company	Port Richmond, New York	Mariners Harbor	Cargo ship	Requisitioned by United States Shipping Board.
20 February	United States	Manitowoc Shipbuilding Company	Manitowoc, Wisconsin	Lake Pewaukee	Cargo ship	Requisitioned by United States Shipping Board.
20 February	United States	William Cramp & Sons	Philadelphia, Pennsylvania	Talbot	Wickes-class destroyer	For United States Navy.
20 February	United States	Bethlehem Alameda	Alameda, California	W. M. Burton	Tanker	Requisitioned by United States Shipping Board.
21 February	United States	Fore River Shipbuilding	Quincy, Massachusetts	Colhoun	Wickes-class destroyer	For United States Navy.
21 February	United States	American Shipbuilding Company	Lorain, Ohio	Lake Ogden	Cargo ship	Requisitioned by United States Shipping Board.
22 February	United States	Fore River Shipbuilding	Quincy, Massachusetts	Katrina Luckenbach	Cargo ship	Requisitioned by United States Shipping Board.
23 February	United States	American Shipbuilding Company	Cleveland, Ohio	Lake Lemando	Design 1020 ship	For United States Shipping Board.
23 February	Germany	AG Vulcan	Hamburg	U-118	Type UE II submarine	For Imperial German Navy
25 February	United States	McDougall-Duluth Shipbuilding	Duluth, Minnesota	Lake Portage	Cargo ship	Requisitioned by United States Shipping Board.
25 February	United Kingdom	Swan Hunter	Wallsend	Wrestler	W-class destroyer	For Royal Navy
26 February	United States	Skinner & Eddy	Seattle, Washington	Canoga	Cargo ship	For United States Shipping Board.
26 February	United States	William Cramp & Sons	Philadelphia, Pennsylvania	Orizaba	Transport ship	Requisitioned by United States Shipping Board.
27 February	United States	Columbia River Shipbuilding	Portland, Oregon	West Indian	Cargo ship	For United States Shipping Board.
27 February	United Kingdom	John Brown & Company	Clydebank	Scimitar	S-class destroyer	
27 February	Germany	Bremer Vulkan	Vegesack	U-160	Type U-93 submarine	For Imperial German Navy
28 February	United States	New York Shipbuilding	Camden, New Jersey	Santa Tecla	Cargo ship	Requisitioned by United States Shipping Board.
28 February	United States	American Shipbuilding Company	Chicago, Illinois	Lake Clear	Cargo ship	Requisitioned by United States Shipping Board.
February	United Kingdom	Northumberland Shipbuilding Ltd.	Newcastle-on-Tyne	War Buffalo	Cargo ship	For British Shipping Controller.

== March ==
Date	Ship	Class	Builder	Location	Country	Notes
2 March	United States	American Shipbuilding Company	Wyandotte, Michigan	Lake Weston	Cargo ship	For United States Shipping Board.
3 March	United States	William Cramp & Sons	Philadelphia, Pennsylvania	Waters	Wickes-class destroyer	For United States Navy.
6 March	United States	Northwest Steel	Portland, Oregon	Western Wave	Cargo ship	Requisitioned by United States Shipping Board.
9 March	United States	American Shipbuilding Company	Cleveland, Ohio	Lake Edon	Cargo ship	For United States Shipping Board.
9 March	United States	Great Lakes Engineering Works	Ashtabula, Ohio	Lake Louise	Cargo ship	Requisitioned by United States Shipping Board.
10 March	F19	F-class submarine	FIAT-San Giorgio	La Spezia	Italy	For Italian Regia Marina (Royal Navy)
11 March	United States	McDougall-Duluth Shipbuilding	Duluth, Minnesota	Lake Markham	Cargo ship	Requisitioned by United States Shipping Board.
11 March	United States	Los Angeles Shipbuilding and Dry Dock Company	San Pedro, California	Wampum or Waumpam	Design 1013 ship	For United States Shipping Board.
14 March	United States	Moore Dry Dock Company	Oakland, California	Alloway	Cargo ship	For United States Shipping Board.
14 March	United States	Moore Dry Dock Company	Oakland, California	Aniwa	Cargo ship	For United States Shipping Board.
14 March	United States	Moore Dry Dock Company	Oakland, California	Oakland	Cargo ship	Requisitioned by United States Shipping Board.
14 March	United States	Skinner & Eddy	Seattle, Washington	Ossineke	Cargo ship	For United States Shipping Board.
14 March	United Kingdom	Harland & Wolff	Belfast	War Bittern	B-type cargo ship	For British Shipping Controller.
14 March	United Kingdom	Ropner & Sons	Stockton-on-Tees	War Panther	Cargo ship	For British Shipping Controller.
15 March	United Kingdom	Craig, Taylor & Co. Ltd.	Stockton-on-Tees	War Loch	Cargo ship	For British Shipping Controller.
15 March	United States	Grays Harbor Motorship Corporation	Aberdeen, Washington	Wishkah	Design 1005 ship	For United States Shipping Board.
16 March	United States	Bethlehem Sparrows Point	Sparrows Point, Maryland	Ampetco	Tanker	Requisitioned by United States Shipping Board.
16 March	United States	Chester Shipbuilding Company	Chester, Pennsylvania	Avondale	Tanker	Requisitioned by United States Shipping Board.
16 March	United Kingdom	Barclay, Curle & Co. Ltd.	Glasgow	Glenapp	Passenger ship	For Glen Line.
17 March	F20	F-class submarine	FIAT-San Giorgio	La Spezia	Italy	For Italian Regia Marina (Royal Navy)
18 March	United States	Supple-Ballin Shipbuilding	Portland, Oregon	Wallowa	Cargo ship	For United States Shipping Board.
19 March	United States	Foundation Company	Newark, New Jersey	Coyote	Cargo ship	For United States Shipping Board.
19 March	United States	Northwest Steel	Portland, Oregon	Western Ocean	Cargo ship	Requisitioned by United States Shipping Board.
20 March	United States	Foundation Company	Portland, Oregon	Commandant Roison	Cargo ship	For French government.
21 March	United States	Great Lakes Engineering Works	Ecorse, Michigan	Lake Crystal	Cargo ship	Requisitioned by United States Shipping Board.
21 March	United States	New York Shipbuilding	Camden, New Jersey	Mineola	Cargo ship	For United States Shipping Board.
23 March	United States	William Cramp & Sons	Philadelphia, Pennsylvania	Dent	Wickes-class destroyer	For United States Navy.
23 March	United States	Toledo Shipbuilding Company	Toledo, Ohio	Lake Sebago	Cargo ship	Requisitioned by United States Shipping Board.
23 March	United States	Union Iron Works	San Francisco, California	McKee	Wickes-class destroyer	For United States Navy.
23 March	United States	Sun Shipbuilding Company	Chester, Pennsylvania	Radnor	Cargo ship	Requisitioned by United States Shipping Board.
23 March	United States	William Cramp & Sons	Philadelphia, Pennsylvania	Santa Luisa	Cargo ship	Requisitioned by United States Shipping Board.
23 March	Germany	Bremer Vulkan	Vegesack	U-161	Type U-93 submarine	For Imperial German Navy.
24 March	United States	Bethlehem Alameda	Alameda, California	Liberator	Cargo ship	For United States Shipping Board.
26 March	United States	G. M. Standifer Construction	Portland, Oregon	Libby Maine	Cargo ship	For Libby, McNeill & Libby.
26 March	United States	Grant Smith-Porter Ship Company		Portland	Design 1003 ship	For United States Shipping Board.
26 March	United States	Kruse & Banks Shipbuilding Company	North Bend, Oregon	Quidnic	Design 1003 ship	For United States Shipping Board.
26 March	United States	J. F. Duthie & Company	Seattle, Washington	Westboro	Cargo ship	Requisitioned by United States Shipping Board.
27 March	United States	Seattle Construction and Dry Dock Company	Seattle, Washington	Bremerton	Cargo ship	Requisitioned by United States Shipping Board.
27 March	United States	Manitowoc Shipbuilding Company	Manitowoc, Wisconsin	Lake Shawano	Cargo ship	Requisitioned by United States Shipping Board.
27 March	United States	Albina Engine & Machine Works	Portland, Oregon	Point Bonita	Cargo ship	Requisitioned by United States Shipping Board.
27 March	United Kingdom	J. W. Brooke & Co. Ltd.	Lowestoft	Spectrum	Naval drifter	For Royal Navy.
27 March	United Kingdom	Sir Raylton Dixon & Co.	Middlesbrough	Valemore	Cargo ship	For Johnstone Line.
27 March	United States	Columbia River Shipbuilding	Portland, Oregon	West Grove	Cargo ship	Requisitioned by United States Shipping Board.
27 March	United States	Peninsula Shipbuilding Company	Portland, Oregon	Unnamed		
28 March	United States	New York Shipbuilding	Camden, New Jersey	Gulfland	Tanker	Requisitioned by United States Shipping Board.
28 March	United States	Newport News Shipbuilding	Newport News, Virginia	Lamberton	Wickes-class destroyer	For United States Navy.
28 March	United States	Union Iron Works	San Francisco, California	Robinson	Wickes-class destroyer	For United States Navy.
28 March	United States	Fore River Shipbuilding	Quincy, Massachusetts	Schley	Wickes-class destroyer	For United States Navy.
28 March	United States	Todd Dry Dock and Construction Company	Tacoma, Washington	Tacoma	Cargo ship	Requisitioned by United States Shipping Board.
28 March	United Kingdom	Harland & Wolff	Belfast	War African	AO tanker	For British Shipping Controller.
28 March	United Kingdom	Harland & Wolff	Belfast	War Buckler	D-type cargo ship	For British Shipping Controller.
28 March	United Kingdom	Harland & Wolff	Belfast	War Tabard	D-type cargo ship	For British Shipping Controller.
28 March	United States	Skinner & Eddy	Seattle, Washington	Western Queen	Cargo ship	Requisitioned by United States Shipping Board.
28 March	Germany	Blohm & Voss	Hamburg	U-124	Type UE II submarine	For Imperial German Navy.
30 March	United States	Bethlehem Sparrows Point	Sparrows Point, Maryland	Cape Henry	Cargo ship	Requisitioned by United States Shipping Board.
30 March	United States	Foundation Company	Portland, Oregon	Capitaine Remy	Cargo ship	For French government.
30 March	United States	McDougall-Duluth Shipbuilding	Duluth, Minnesota	Lake Pepin	Cargo ship	Requisitioned by United States Shipping Board.
30 March	United States	American Shipbuilding Company	Wyandotte, Michigan	Lake Stirling	Cargo ship	Requisitioned by United States Shipping Board.
30 March	United States	Babare Brothers	Tacoma, Washington	Mahaska	Design 1001 ship	For United States Shipping Board.
30 March	United States	Standard Shipbuilding Company	Shooters Island, New York	Montclair	Cargo ship	Requisitioned by United States Shipping Board.
30 March	United Kingdom	John Brown & Company	Clydebank	Scotsman	S-class destroyer	

== April ==
Date	Ship	Class	Builder	Location	Country	Notes
4 April	United States	Great Lakes Engineering Works	Ecorse, Michigan	Lake Allen	Cargo ship	Requisitioned by United States Shipping Board.
4 April	United States	Manitowoc Shipbuilding Company	Manitowoc, Wisconsin	Lake Lida	Cargo ship	Requisitioned by United States Shipping Board.
4 April	Germany	AG Vulcan	Hamburg	U-119	Type UE II submarine	For Imperial German Navy.
5 April	United States	Newport News Shipbuilding	Newport News, Virginia	Montgomery	Wickes-class destroyer	For United States Navy.
5 April	United States	Newport News Shipbuilding	Newport News, Virginia	Radford	Wickes-class destroyer	For United States Navy.
6 April	United States	Toledo Shipbuilding Company	Toledo, Ohio	Lake Cayuga	Cargo ship	Requisitioned by United States Shipping Board.
6 April	United States	American Shipbuilding Company	Lorain, Ohio	Lake Weir	Cargo ship	Requisitioned by United States Shipping Board.
6 April	United States	Baltimore Dry Dock and Shipbuilding Company	Baltimore, Maryland	Polar Land	Refrigerated cargo ship	Requisitioned by United States Shipping Board.
6 April	Germany	AG Vulcan	Stettin	Rostock	Cöln-class cruiser	For Imperial German Navy.
7 April	United States	Union Iron Works	San Francisco, California	Champlin	Wickes-class destroyer	For United States Navy.
9 April	United States	Foundation Company	Portland, Oregon	Capitaine Guyneme	Cargo ship	For French government.
9 April	United States	William Cramp & Sons	Philadelphia, Pennsylvania	Dorsey	Wickes-class destroyer	For United States Navy.
9 April	United States	Puget Sound Bridge and Dredging Company	Seattle, Washington	Peronne	Auxiliary schooner	For French government.
9 April	Canada	Lyall Shipbuilding Company	North Vancouver	War Cariboo	Cargo ship	
9 April	United Kingdom	Swan Hunter & Wigham Richardson,	Wallsend on Tyne	Shark	S-class destroyer	
11 April	United States	Grant Smith-Porter Ship Company	Portland, Oregon	Moritz	Design 1003 ship	For United States Shipping Board.
11 April	United States	Albina Engine & Machine Works	Portland, Oregon	Point Lobos or Point Lobas	Cargo ship	Requisitioned by United States Shipping Board.
11 April	United Kingdom	Richardson, Duck & Company		War Vulture	Cargo ship	For British Shipping Controller.
11 April	United States	Skinner & Eddy	Seattle, Washington	West Durfee	Cargo ship	For United States Shipping Board.
13 April	United States	Fore River Shipbuilding	Quincy, Massachusetts	Dyer	Wickes-class destroyer	For United States Navy.
11 April	United States	Columbia Engineering Works	Portland, Oregon	Elvira Stolt	Auxiliary schooner	For Christian Christianson.
11 April	United States	Globe Shipbuilding	Superior, Wisconsin	Lake Washburn	Cargo ship	Requisitioned by United States Shipping Board.
14 April	United States	Union Iron Works	San Francisco, California	Mugford	Wickes-class destroyer	For United States Navy.
14 April	United States	Union Iron Works	San Francisco, California	Ringgold	Wickes-class destroyer	For United States Navy.
14 April	United States	Los Angeles Shipbuilding and Dry Dock Company	San Pedro, California	Wassaic	Design 1013 ship	For United States Shipping Board.
15 April	United States	Kruse & Banks Shipbuilding Company	North Bend, Oregon	Kickapoo	Design 1003 ship	For United States Shipping Board.
16 or 20 April	United States	Peninsula Shipbuilding Company	Portland, Oregon	Anoka	Cargo ship	For United States Shipping Board.
16 April	United States	Ames Shipbuilding and Dry Dock Company	Seattle, Washington	West Mount	Cargo ship	Requisitioned by United States Shipping Board.
17 April	United States	Patterson-MacDonald Shipbuilding Company	Seattle, Washington	Bellata	Cargo ship	
17 April	United States	Rolph Shipbuilding Company	Eureka, California	Joan of Arc	Cargo ship	
17 April	United States	Moore Plant	Elizabethport, New Jersey	Plainfield	Cargo ship	Requisitioned by United States Shipping Board.
18 April	United States	Foundation Company	Portland, Oregon	Lieutenant Delorme	Cargo ship	For French government.
18 April	United States	Supple-Ballin Shipbuilding	Portland, Oregon	Calala	Cargo ship	For United States Shipping Board.
20 April	United States	Fore River Shipbuilding	Quincy, Massachusetts	Bell	Wickes-class destroyer	For United States Shipping Board.
20 April	United States	New York Shipbuilding	Camden, New Jersey	Glen White	Collier	Requisitioned by United States Shipping Board.
20 April	United States	American Shipbuilding Company	Lorain, Ohio	Lake Benton	Cargo ship	Requisitioned by United States Shipping Board.
20 April	United States	Great Lakes Engineering Works	Ashtabula, Ohio	Lake Chariotte	Cargo ship	Requisitioned by United States Shipping Board.
20 April	United States	American Shipbuilding Company	Wyandotte, Michigan	Lake Felicity	Cargo ship	Requisitioned by United States Shipping Board.
20 April	United States	Great Lakes Engineering Works	Ecorse, Michigan	Lake Hemlock	Cargo ship	Requisitioned by United States Shipping Board.
20 April	United States	Seaborn Shipyards	Tacoma, Washington	Mohave	Design 1001 ship	For United States Shipping Board.
20 April	United States	Grant Smith-Porter Ship Company	Portland, Oregon	Wakan	Cargo ship	
20 April	United States	Northwest Steel	Portland, Oregon	Western Chief	Cargo ship	Requisitioned by United States Shipping Board.
20 April	United States	Skinner & Eddy	Seattle, Washington	West Lianga	Cargo ship	For United States Shipping Board.
20 April	Germany	Bremer Vulkan	Vegesack	U-162	Type U-93 submarine	For Imperial German Navy.
21 April	United States	Pacific-Alaska Construction Company		Alabama	Cargo ship	
24 April	United States	McEachern Shipbuilding Company	Astoria, Oregon	Astoria	Design 1003 ship	For United States Shipping Board.
24 April	United States	Grant Smith-Porter Ship Company	Portland, Oregon	Caponka	Design 1001 ship	For United States Shipping Board.
24 April	United States	J. F. Duthie & Company	Seattle, Washington	West Bridge	Cargo ship	Requisitioned by United States Shipping Board.
25 April	United Kingdom	Harland & Wolff	Belfast	Narkunda	Passenger ship	For Peninsular & Oriental Steam Navigation Company.
25 April	United States	Pacific American Fisheries	Bellingham, Washington	Oakwood	Cargo ship	For Pacific American Fisheries.
25 April	United States	Lake & Ocean Navigation Company	Sturgeon Bay, Wisconsin	Sturgeon Bay	Cargo ship	For United States Shipping Board.
25 April	Canada	Cameron-Genoa Shipbuilding	Victoria	War Haida	Cargo ship	For British Shipping Controller.
26 April	United Kingdom	Ropner & Sons	Stockton-on-Tees	War Monsoon	Cargo ship	For British Shipping Controller.
27 April	United States	Foundation Company	Newark, New Jersey	Accoma	Cargo ship	Requisitioned by United States Shipping Board.
27 April	United States	Newport News Shipbuilding	Newport News, Virginia	H. M. Flagier	Tanker	Requisitioned by United States Shipping Board.
27 April	United States	Toledo Shipbuilding Company	Toledo, Ohio	Lake Chelan	Cargo ship	Requisitioned by United States Shipping Board.
27 April	United States	American Shipbuilding Company	Wyandotte, Michigan	Lake Ennis	Design 1020 ship	For United States Shipping Board.
27 April	United States	Texas Steamship Company	Bath, Maine	Sagadahoc	Cargo ship	Requisitioned by United States Shipping Board.
27 April	United StatesMotorship Construction Company		Vancouver, Washington	Shepard Point	Cargo ship	
27 April	United States	Pusey & Jones	Wilmington, Delaware	Wuakesha	Cargo ship	Requisitioned by United States Shipping Board.
27 April	United Kingdom	John Brown & Company	Clydebank	Scout	S-class destroyer	
28 April	United States	Coos Bay Shipbuilding Company	Marshfield, Oregon	Coos Bay	Cargo ship	
29 April	United States	William Cramp & Sons	Philadelphia, Pennsylvania	Lea	Wickes-class destroyer	For United States Navy.
29 April	United States	Coast Shipbuilding Company	Portland, Oregon	Barabos	Design 1001 ship	For United States Shipping Board.
30 April	United States	Foundation Company	Portland, Oregon	Commandant Challes	Cargo ship	
30 April	United States	Manitowoc Shipbuilding Company	Manitowoc, Wisconsin	Lake Annette	Cargo ship	Requisitioned by United States Shipping Board.
30 April	United States	American Shipbuilding Company	Superior, Wisconsin	Lake Ledan	Design 1020 ship	For United States Shipping Board.
30 April	United States	American Shipbuilding Company	Chicago, Illinois	Lake Yemassee	Design 1020 ship	For United States Shipping Board.
30 April	United States	Columbia River Shipbuilding	Portland, Oregon	Western City	Cargo ship	For United States Shipping Board.
30 April	United States	Bethlehem Alameda	Alameda, California	W.S. Rheem	Tanker	Requisitioned by United States Shipping Board.

== May ==
Date	Ship	Class	Builder	Location	Country	Notes
1 May	United States	Foundation Company	Tacoma, Washington	Gerbeviller	Schooner	
1 May	United States	Wright Shipbuilding	Tacoma, Washington	Yakima	Design 1001 ship	For United States Shipping Board.
2 May	United States	Peninsula Shipbuilding Company	Portland, Oregon	Cresap	Cargo ship	
4 May	United States	Bethlehem Sparrows Point	Sparrows Point, Maryland	Cape Romaine	Cargo ship	Requisitioned by United States Shipping Board.
4 May	United States	Grays Harbor Motorship Corporation	Aberdeen, Washington	Kaskaskia	Design 1005 ship	For United States Shipping Board.
4 May	United States	American Shipbuilding Company	Lorain, Ohio	Lake Fernwood	Cargo ship	Requisitioned by United States Shipping Board.
4 May	United States	American Shipbuilding Company	Cleveland, Ohio	Lake Narka	Design 1020 ship	For United States Shipping Board.
4 May	United States	Albina Engine & Machine Works	Portland, Oregon	Point Judith	Cargo ship	Requisitioned by United States Shipping Board.
5 May	United States	Sun Shipbuilding Company	Chester, Pennsylvania	Lancaster	Cargo ship	Requisitioned by United States Shipping Board.
5 May	United States	New York Shipbuilding	Camden, New Jersey	Tuckahow	Collier	Requisitioned by United States Shipping Board.
6 May	United States	Bethlehem Wilmington	Wilmington, Delaware	Biran	Cargo ship	Requisitioned by United States Shipping Board.
6 May	United States	Northwest Steel	Portland, Oregon	Western Spirit	Cargo ship	Requisitioned by United States Shipping Board.
7 May	United States	Long Beach Shipbuilding Company	Long Beach, California	Elderado	Cargo ship	Requisitioned by United States Shipping Board.
7 May	United Kingdom	Fairfield	Govan	Sikh	S-class destroyer	
8 May	United States	Russell Shipbuilding Company	Portland, Maine	Andra	Cargo ship	For United States Shipping Board.
8 May	United States	Seaborn Shipyards	Tacoma, Washington	Cheron	Design 1001 ship	For United States Shipping Board.
8 May	United States	St. Helens Shipbuilding Company	St. Helens, Oregon	Issaquena	Design 1001 ship	For United States Shipping Board.
9 May	United States	Great Lakes Engineering Works	Ecorse, Michigan	Lakehurst	Cargo ship	Requisitioned by United States Shipping Board.
9 May	United Kingdom	Harland & Wolff	Belfast	War Lemur	B-type cargo ship	For British shipping Controller.
11 May	United States	Newport News Shipbuilding	Newport News, Virginia	Breese	Wickes-class destroyer	For United States Navy.
11 May	United States	Newport News Shipbuilding	Newport News, Virginia	Gamble	Wickes-class destroyer	For United States Navy.
11 May	United States	American Shipbuilding Company	Wyandotte, Michigan	Lake Largo	Design 1020 ship	For United States Shipping Board.
11 May	United States	Foundation Company	Portland, Oregon	Lieutenant Granier	Cargo ship	
11 May	United States	Albina Engine & Machine Works	Portland, Oregon	Point Adams	Cargo ship	Requisitioned by United States Shipping Board.
11 May	United Kingdom	J. W. Brooke & Co. Ltd.	Lowestoft	Sheen	Naval drifter	For Royal Navy.
11 May	Canada	Lyall Shipyards	Vancouver	War Atlin	Cargo ship	
11 May	United States	Skinner & Eddy	Seattle, Washington	West Alsek	Design 1013 ship	For United States Shipping Board.
14 May	United States	Sommarstrom Shipbuilding	Columbia City, Oregon	Musketo	Design 1003 ship	For United States Shipping Board.
14 May	United Kingdom	Swan Hunter & Wigham Richardson,	Wallsend on Tyne	Sparrowhawk	S-class destroyer	
15 May	United States	Coast Shipbuilding Company	Portland, Oregon	Barrington	Cargo ship	
15 May	United States	Tacoma Shipbuilding Company	Tacoma, Washington	Beloit	Design 1001 ship	For United States Shipping Board.
15 May	United States	Grays Harbor Motorship Corporation	Aberdeen, Washington	Blackford	Design 1005 ship	For United States Shipping Board.
15 May	United States	Fulton Shipbuilding Company	Los Angeles, California	Catawba	Design 1001 ship	For United States Shipping Board.
15 May	United States	Grant Smith-Porter Ship Company	Portland, Oregon	Kuwa	Cargo ship	
18 May	United States	Meacham & Babcock	Seattle, Washington	Boulton	Design 1001 ship	For United States Shipping Board.
18 May	United States	Supple-Ballin Shipbuilding	Portland, Oregon	Dalana	Cargo ship	For United States Shipping Board.
18 May	United States	Standard Shipbuilding Company	Shooters Island, New York	Englewood	Cargo ship	For United States Shipping Board.
18 May	United States	Moore Dry Dock Company	Oakland, California	Fresno	Cargo ship	For United States Shipping Board.
18 May	United States	Fore River Shipbuilding	Quincy, Massachusetts	George W. Barnes	Tanker	Requisitioned by United States Shipping Board.
18 May	United States	Hanlon Dry Dock and Shipbuilding	Oakland, California	Governor John Lind	Cargo ship	Requisitioned by United States Shipping Board.
18 May	United States	American Shipbuilding Company	Buffalo, New York	Lake Bledsoe	Design 1020 ship	For United States Shipping Board.
18 May	United States	American Shipbuilding Company	Lorain, Ohio	Lake Harney	Cargo ship	Requisitioned by United States Shipping Board.
18 May	United States	Moore Dry Dock Company	Oakland, California	Oshawa	Cargo ship	
18 May	United States	McEachern Shipbuilding Company	Astoria, Oregon	Quoque	Design 1001 ship	For United States Shipping Board.
18 May	United States	Wilson Shipbuilding	Astoria, Oregon	Quoquo	Design 1001 ship	For United States Shipping Board.
18 May	United States	Matthews Shipbuilding Company	Hoquiam, Washington	San Diego	Auxiliary schooner	For Hart-Wood Lumber Co.
18 May	United States	Bethlehem Alameda	Alameda, California	Volunteer	Cargo ship	For United States Shipping Board.
19 May	F21	F-class submarine	FIAT-San Giorgio	La Spezia	Italy	For Italian Regia Marina (Royal Navy)
20 May	United States	Patterson-MacDonald Shipbuilding Company	Seattle, Washington	Bundarra	Cargo ship	
21 May	United States	American Shipbuilding Company	Superior, Wisconsin	Lake Lesa	Design 1020 ship	For United States Shipping Board.
22 May	United States	American Shipbuilding Company	Cleveland, Ohio	Lake Duncan	Design 1020 ship	For United States Shipping Board.
22 May	United States	American Shipbuilding Company	Wyandotte, Michigan	Lake Lasang	Design 1020 ship	For United States Shipping Board.
22 May	United States	Great Lakes Engineering Works	Ecorse, Michigan	Lake Mary	Cargo ship	Requisitioned by United States Shipping Board.
22 May	United Kingdom	Cammell Laird & Co. Ltd.	Birkenhead	Stavangerfjord	Passenger ship	For Norwegian America Line.
23 May	United States	Todd Dry Dock and Construction Company	Tacoma, Washington	Masuda	Cargo ship	Requisitioned by United States Shipping Board.
23 May	United States	Puget Sound Bridge and Dredging Company	Seattle, Washington	Samuel H. Hedges	Schooner	
23 May	United States	Skinner & Eddy		West Apaum	Design 1013 ship	For United States Shipping Board.
24 May	United States	Bethlehem Wilmington	Wilmington, Delaware	Garibaldi	Cargo ship	Requisitioned by United States Shipping Board.
24 May	United States	Seattle Construction and Dry Dock Company	Seattle, Washington	Vittorio Emmanuele	Cargo ship	Requisitioned by United States Shipping Board
25 May	United States	Toledo Shipbuilding Company	Toledo, Ohio	Lake Catherine	Cargo ship	Requisitioned by United States Shipping Board.
25 May	United States	Staten Island Shipbuilding Company	Port Richmond, New York	Sag Harbor	Cargo ship	Requisitioned by United States Shipping Board.
25 May	United Kingdom	Harland & Wolff	Belfast	War Legate	AO tanker	For British Shipping Controller.
25 May	United Kingdom	Sir Raylton Dixon & Co	Middlesbrough	War Spartan	Tanker	For British Shipping Controller.
25 May	United States	Grant Smith-Porter Ship Company	Portland, Oregon	Wakan	Cargo ship	
25 May	United States	J. F. Duthie & Company	Seattle, Washington	Western Sea	Cargo ship	Requisitioned by United States Shipping Board.
25 May	United States	Los Angeles Shipbuilding and Dry Dock Company	San Pedro, California	West Galoc	Design 1013 ship	Requisitioned by United States Shipping Board.
26 May	United States	Union Iron Works	San Francisco, California	Chew	Wickes-class destroyer	For United States Navy.
26 May	Germany	Blohm & Voss	Hamburg	U-125	Type UE II submarine	For Imperial German Navy
27 May	United States	Foundation Company	Portland, Oregon	Capitaine de Beauchamp	Cargo ship	
27 May	United States	Great Lakes Engineering Works	Ashtabula, Ohio	Lake Harris	Cargo ship	Requisitioned by United States Shipping Board.
27 May	United States	Craig, Taylor & Co. Ltd.	Stockton-on-Tees	War Kestrel	Cargo ship	For British Shipping Controller.
27 May	United States	Northwest Steel	Portland, Oregon	Western Light	Cargo ship	Requisitioned by United States Shipping Board.
28 May	United States	Manitowoc Shipbuilding Company	Manitowoc, Wisconsin	Lake Greenwood	Cargo ship	Requisitioned by United States Shipping Board.
28 May	United States	American Shipbuilding Company	Chicago, Illinois	Lake Yahara	Design 1020 ship	For United States Shipping Board.
29 May	United States	Fore River Shipbuilding	Quincy, Massachusetts	Stribling	Wickes-class destroyer	For United States Navy.
29 May	United States	Grays Harbor Motorship Corporation	Aberdeen, Washington	Bromela	Design 1005 ship	For United States Shipping Board.
29 May	United States	Seattle Construction and Dry Dock Company	Seattle, Washington	Willimantic	Cargo ship	For United States Shipping Board.
30 May	United States	Submarine Boat Corporation	Newark, New Jersey	Agwam	Design 1023 ship	For United States Shipping Board.
30 May	United States	Ames Shipbuilding and Dry Dock Company	Seattle, Washington	Westford	Cargo ship	Requisitioned by United States Shipping Board.
31 May	United States	Chester Shipbuilding Company	Chester, Pennsylvania	Phoenix	Tanker	For United States Shipping Board.
31 May	United States	Foundation Company	Portland, Oregon	Lieutenant Pegoud	Auxiliary schooner	
May	United Kingdom	Blyth Shipbuilding & Dry Docks Co. Ltd	Blyth	War Bagpipe	cargo ship	For British Shipping Controller.

== June ==
Date	Ship	Class	Builder	Location	Country	Notes
1 June	United States	Traylor Shipbuilding Corporation	Cornwells Heights, Pennsylvania	Alvada	Cargo ship	For United States Shipping Board.
1 June	United States	American Shipbuilding Company	Lorain, Ohio	Lake Winico	Cargo ship	Requisitioned by United States Shipping Board.
1 June	United States	Foundation Company	Tacoma, Washington	Roy	Schooner	
1 June	Germany	Bremer Vulkan	Vegesack	U-163	Type U-93 submarine	For Imperial German Navy.
2 June	United States	Schaw-Batcher Shipbuilding Company	South San Francisco, California	Isanti	Cargo ship	For United States Shipping Board.
4 June	United States	Groton Iron Works	Noank, Connecticut	Hokah	Cargo ship	For United States Shipping Board.
5 June	United States	Long Beach Shipbuilding Company	Long Beach, California	Ozaukee	Design 1021 ship	For United States Shipping Board.
6 June	United States	Sanderson & Porter	Raymond, Washington	Fonduco	Design 1001 ship	
6 June	United Kingdom	Richardson, Duck & Company		War Ostrich	Cargo ship	For British Shipping Controller.
6 June	United States	Skinner & Eddy	Seattle, Washington	West Cohas	Design 1013 ship	For United States Shipping Board.
8 June	United States	Bethlehem Wilmington	Wilmington, Delaware	J. A. Bostwick	Tanker	Requisitioned by United States Shipping Board.
8 June	United States	American Shipbuilding Company	Cleveland, Ohio	Lake Blancester	Design 1020 ship	For United States Shipping Board.
8 June	United States	Fore River Shipbuilding	Quincy, Massachusetts	Murray	Wickes-class destroyer	For United States Navy.
8 June	United Kingdom	Blyth Shipbuilding & Dry Docks Co. Ltd	Blyth	Ormonde	24-class sloop	For Royal Navy.
8 June	United States	Newport News Shipbuilding	Newport News, Virginia	Ramsay	Wickes-class destroyer	For United States Navy.
9 June	United States	Pusey & Jones	Gloucester City, New Jersey	Allentown	Tanker	Requisitioned by United States Shipping Board.
9 June	United States	Union Iron Works	San Francisco, California	Ludlow	Wickes-class destroyer	For United States Navy.
10 June	United States	Wilson Shipbuilding	Astoria, Oregon	Lonoke	Design 1001 ship	For United States Shipping Board.
10 June	United Kingdom	Ropner & Sons	Stockton-on-Tees	War Pigeon	Cargo ship	For British Shipping Controller.
11 June	United States	Sommarstrom Shipbuilding	Portland, Oregon	Mattapan	Design 1003 ship	
11 June	United States	Seaborn Shipyards	Tacoma, Washington	Mazama	Design 1001 ship	
11 June	United States	Foundation Company	Tacoma, Washington	Dannermarie	Cargo ship	
11 June	United States	Irvine's Shipbuilding & Dry Docks Co. Ltd.	West Hartlepool	Manchester Division	Cargo ship	For Manchester Liners Ltd.
11 June	United Kingdom	Irvine's Shipbuilding & Dry Docks Co. Ltd.	West Hartlepool	War Hamlet	Cargo ship	For British Shipping Controller.
12 June	United States	Wright Shipbuilding	Tacoma, Washington	Eyota	Design 1001 ship	
12 June	United States	American Shipbuilding Company	Wyandotte, Michigan	Lake Daraga	Design 1020 ship	For United States Shipping Board.
12 June	United States	McEachern Shipbuilding Company	Astoria, Oregon	Makanda	Design 1013 ship	
13 June	United States	Great Lakes Engineering Works	Ecorse, Michigan	Lake Conesus	Cargo ship	Requisitioned by United States Shipping Board.
15 June	United States	Nielson & Kelez Shipbuilding Company	Seattle, Washington	Bonnafon	Design 1001 ship	For United States Shipping Board.
15 June	United States	Toledo Shipbuilding Company	Toledo, Ohio	J . W. McGrath	Cargo ship	Requisitioned by United States Shipping Board.
15 June	United States	Ames Shipbuilding and Dry Dock Company	Seattle, Washington	Montrolite	Tanker	Requisitioned by United States Shipping Board.
16 June	Germany	Blohm & Voss	Hamburg	U-126	Type UE II submarine	For Imperial German Navy
17 June	United States	Baltimore Dry Dock and Shipbuilding Company	Baltimore, Maryland	South Pole	Refrigerated cargo ship	Requisitioned by United States Shipping Board.
18 June	United States	Foundation Company	Portland, Oregon	Adjutant Dorme	Cargo ship	
18 June	United States	Ballard Shipbuilding Company	Seattle, Washington	H. B. Lovejoy	Auxiliary schooner	
18 June	United States	American Shipbuilding Company	Chicago, Illinois	Lake Bloomington	Design 1020 ship	For United States Shipping Board.
19 June	United States	Manitowoc Shipbuilding Company	Manitowoc, Wisconsin	Lake Monroe	Cargo ship	Requisitioned by United States Shipping Board.
19 June	United States	Federal Shipbuilding	Kearny, New Jersey	Liberty	Design 1037 ship	For United States Shipping Board.
19 June	United States	Foundation Company	Tacoma, Washington	Reims	Auxiliary steamship	
20 June	United States	Seattle Construction and Dry Dock Company	Seattle, Washington	Deranof	Cargo ship	For United States Shipping Board.
20 June	Germany	AG Vulcan	Hamburg	U-120	Type UE II submarine	For Imperial German Navy
22 June	United States	Fore River Shipbuilding	Quincy, Massachusetts	Israel	Wickes-class destroyer	For United States Navy.
22 June	United States	Bethlehem Sparrows Point	Sparrows Point, Maryland	Cape Lookout	Cargo ship	Requisitioned by United States Shipping Board.
22 June	United States	Union Iron Works	San Francisco, California	Hazelwood	Wickes-class destroyer	For United States Navy.
22 June	United States	American Shipbuilding Company	Superior, Wisconsin	Lake Dymer	Design 1020 ship	For United States Shipping Board.
22 June	United States	McDougall-Duluth Shipbuilding	Duluth, Minnesota	Lake Geneva	Cargo ship	Requisitioned by United States Shipping Board.
22 June	United States	Pusey & Jones	Wilmington, Delaware	Middleburg	Cargo ship	For United States Shipping Board.
22 June	United States	Skinner & Eddy	Seattle, Washington	West Ekonk	Design 1013 ship	For United States Shipping Board.
22 June	United States	New York Shipbuilding	Camden, New Jersey	Winding Gulf	Collier	Requisitioned by United States Shipping Board.
22 June	United States	Saginaw Shipbuilding Company	Saginaw, Michigan	Lake Pachuta	Design 1020 ship	For United States Shipping Board.
23 June	United States	Kruse & Banks Shipbuilding Company	North Bend, Oregon	Coconino	Design 1003 ship	
24 June	United States	Standard Shipbuilding Company	Shooters Island, New York	Galesburg	Cargo ship	Requisitioned by United States Shipping Board.
24 June	United States	Columbia Engineering Works	Portland, Oregon	Louisa Bryne	Cargo ship	
24 June	Canada	Lyall Shipyards	Vancouver	War Nicola	Cargo ship	
25 June	United States	Russell Shipbuilding Company	Portland, Maine	Bassan	Cargo ship	For United States Shipping Board.
25 June	United States	Foundation Company	Newark, New Jersey	Congaree	Cargo ship	For United States Shipping Board.
25 June	United States	Foundation Company	Newark, New Jersey	Coweta	Cargo ship	For United States Shipping Board.
25 June	United States	Bath Iron Works	Bath, Maine	Wickes	Wickes-class destroyer	For United States NAvy.
25 June	United States	American Shipbuilding Company	Lorain, Ohio	Lake Eckhart	Design 1020 ship	For United States Shipping Board.
26 June	United States	Foundation Company	Tacoma, Washington	Arras	Cargo ship	
26 June	United States	American Shipbuilding Company	Wyandotte, Michigan	Lake Damita	Design 1020 ship	For United States Shipping Board.
27 June	United States	Patterson-MacDonald Shipbuilding Company	Seattle, Washington	Diriwu	Cargo ship	
27 June	United Kingdom	Harland & Wolff	Belfast	St Aubin	Tug	For Royal Navy.
28 June	United Kingdom	Craig, Taylor & Co. Ltd.	Stockton-on-Tees	War Island	Cargo ship	For British Shipping Controller.
28 June	United Kingdom	Sir Raylton Dixon & Co	Middlesbrough	War Typhoon	Cargo ship	For British Shipping Controller.
29 June	United States	Fore River Shipbuilding	Quincy, Massachusetts	Luce	Wickes-class destroyer	For United States Navy.
29 June	United Kingdom	William Doxford & Sons	Sunderland	Success	S-class destroyer	

== July ==
Date	Ship	Class	Builder	Location	Country	Notes
2 July	United States	Groton Iron Works	Noank, Connecticut	Balsto	Cargo ship	For United States Shipping Board.
3 July	Denmark			Niels Juel	Coastal defense ship	For Royal Danish Navy.
4 July	United States	Newport News Shipbuilding	Newport News, Virginia	Abbot	Wickes-class destroyer	For United States Navy.
4 July	United States	Submarine Boat Corporation	Newark, New Jersey	Alamosa	Design 1023 ship	For United States Shipping Board.
4 July	United States	Foundation Company	Newark, New Jersey	Alanthus	Cargo ship	For United States Shipping Board.
4 July	United States	Traylor Shipbuilding Corporation	Cornwells Heights, Pennsylvania	Alapaha	Cargo ship	For United States Shipping Board.
4 July	United States	Submarine Boat Corporation	Newark, New Jersey	Alcona	Design 1023 ship	For United States Shipping Board.
4 July	United States	Todd Dry Dock and Construction Company	Tacoma, Washington	Anacortes	Cargo ship	Requisitioned by United States Shipping Board.
4 July	United States	Rolph Shipbuilding Company	Eureka, California	Annette Rolph	Barquentine	
4 July	United States	Pusey & Jones	Wilmington, Delaware	Aurora	Cargo ship	Requisitioned by United States Shipping Board.
4 July	United States	Hammond Yards	Eureka, California	Bloomington	Cargo ship	
4 July	United States	Pacific American Fisheries	Bellingham, Washington	Blythedale	Cargo ship	
4 July	United States	Wilson Shipbuilding	Astoria, Oregon	Benvola	Design 1003 ship	
4 July	United States	George F. Rodgers & Company	Astoria, Oregon	Blue Eagle	Design 1001 ship	
4 July	United States	Wilson Shipbuilding	Astoria, Oregon	Bonifay	Design 1001 ship	
4 July	United States	Wright Shipbuilding	Tacoma, Washington	Bourneville	Cargo ship	
4 July	United States	Peninsula Shipbuilding Company	Portland, Oregon	Braeburn	Design 1001 ship	
4 July	United States	Grays Harbor Motorship Corporation	Aberdeen, Washington	Brompton	Design 1005 ship	For United States Shipping Board.
4 July	United States	Grays Harbor Motorship Corporation	Aberdeen, Washington	Broncho	Design 1005 ship	For United States Shipping Board.
4 July	United States	Union Iron Works	San Francisco, California	Burns	Wickes-class destroyer	For United States Navy.
4 July	United States	Bethlehem Alameda	Alameda, California	Challenger	Cargo ship	For United States Shipping Board.
4 July	United States	L. H. Shattuck	Portsmouth, New Hampshire	Chibiabos	Cargo ship	For United States Shipping Board.
4 July	United States	Seaborn Shipyards	Tacoma, Washington	Chimo	Design 1001 ship	For United States Shipping Board.
4 July	United States	St. Helens Shipbuilding Company	St. Helens, Oregon	Colindo	Design 1001 ship	
4 July	United States	Tacoma Shipbuilding Company	Tacoma, Washington	Coloma	Design 1001 ship	
4 July	United States	McEachern Shipbuilding Company	Astoria, Oregon	Cotteral	Cargo ship	
4 July	United States	Union Iron Works	San Francisco, California	Crane	Wickes-class destroyer	For United States Navy.
4 July	United States	Meacham & Babcock	Seattle, Washington	Daca	Design 1001 ship	For United States Shipping Board.
4 July	United States	Bethlehem Alameda	Alameda, California	Defiance	Cargo ship	Requisitioned by United States Shipping Board.
4 July	United States	Seattle Construction and Dry Dock Company	Seattle, Washington	Delight	Cargo ship	
4 July	United States	Foundation Company	Tacoma, Washington	Dunkerke	Cargo ship	
4 July	United States	William Cramp & Sons	Philadelphia, Pennsylvania	Elliot	Wickes-class destroyer	For United States Navy.
4 July	United States	Tacoma Shipbuilding Company	Tacoma, Washington	Fasset	Design 1001 ship	
4 July	United States	Nielson & Kelez Shipbuilding Company	Seattle, Washington	Forster	Design 1001 ship	For United States Shipping Board.
4 July	United States	Moore Plant	Elizabethport, New Jersey	Garfield	Cargo ship	Requisitioned by United States Shipping Board.
4 July	United States	Rolph Shipbuilding Company	Eureka, California	Georgie Rolph	Barquentine	
4 July	United States	Union Iron Works	San Francisco, California	Gridley	Wickes-class destroyer	For United States Navy.
4 July	United States	Moore Dry Dock Company	Oakland, California	Guimba	Refrigerated cargo ship	For United States Shipping Board.
4 July	United States	Newport News Shipbuilding	Newport News, Virginia	Haraden	Wickes-class destroyer	For United States Navy.
4 July	United States	Union Iron Works	San Francisco, California	Harding	Wickes-class destroyer	For United States Navy.
4 July	United States	Union Iron Works	San Francisco, California	Hart	Wickes-class destroyer	For United States Navy.
4 July	United States	Bethlehem Alameda	Alameda, California	Independence	Cargo ship	Requisitioned by United States Shipping Board.
4 July	United States	Pusey & Jones	Gloucester City, New Jersey	Indianapolis	Cargo ship	Requisitioned by United States Shipping Board.
4 July	United States	Union Iron Works	San Francisco, California	Ingraham	Wickes-class destroyer	For United States Navy.
4 July	United States	Fulton Shipbuilding Company	Aberdeen, Washington	Itanca	Design 1001 ship	
4 July	United States	Sanderson & Porter	Raymond, Washington	Kenosha	Design 1001 ship	
4 July	United States	American Shipbuilding Company	Superior, Wisconsin	Lake Aurice	Design 1020 ship	For United States Shipping Board.
4 July	United States	American Shipbuilding Company	Wyandotte, Michigan	Lake Benbow	Design 1020 ship	For United States Shipping Board.
4 July	United States	American Shipbuilding Company	Chicago, Illinois	Lake Berdan	Design 1020 ship	For United States Shipping Board.
4 July	United States	Globe Shipbuilding	Superior, Wisconsin	Lake Borgne	Cargo ship	Requisitioned by United States Shipping Board.
4 July	United States	American Shipbuilding Company	Buffalo, New York	Lake Delancey	Design 1020 ship	For United States Shipping Board.
4 July	United States	American Shipbuilding Company	Lorain, Ohio	Lake Eliko	Design 1020 ship	For United States Shipping Board.
4 July	United States	American Shipbuilding Company	Cleveland, Ohio	Lake Gedney	Design 1020 ship	For United States Shipping Board.
4 July	United States	McDougall-Duluth Shipbuilding	Duluth, Minnesota	Lake Helen	Cargo ship	Requisitioned by United States Shipping Board.
4 July	United States	Great Lakes Engineering Works	Ecorse, Michigan	Lake Janet	Cargo ship	Requisitioned by United States Shipping Board.
4 July	United States	Great Lakes Engineering Works	Ecorse, Michigan	Lake Pearl	Cargo ship	Requisitioned by United States Shipping Board.
4 July	United States	Great Lakes Engineering Works	Ashtabula, Ohio	Lake Pleasant	Cargo ship	Requisitioned by United States Shipping Board.
4 July	United States	Great Lakes Engineering Works	Ecorse, Michigan	Lake Silver	Cargo ship	Requisitioned by United States Shipping Board.
4 July	United States	Manitowoc Shipbuilding Company	Manitowoc, Wisconsin	Lake Winthrop	Cargo ship	Requisitioned by United States Shipping Board.
4 July	United States	Hanlon Dry Dock and Shipbuilding	Oakland, California	Major Wheeler	Cargo ship	Requisitioned by United States Shipping Board.
4 July	United States	Sommarstrom Shipbuilding	Columbia City, Oregon	Maratanza	Cargo ship	
4 July	United States	Fore River Shipbuilding	Quincy, Massachusetts	Maury	Wickes-class destroyer	For United States Navy.
4 July	United States	Union Iron Works	San Francisco, California	McKean	Wickes-class destroyer	For United States Navy.
4 July	United States	New York Shipbuilding	Camden, New Jersey	M. J. Scanlon	Cargo ship	Requisitioned by United States Shipping Board.
4 July	United States	Fulton Shipbuilding Company	Los Angeles, California	Mono	Design 1003 ship	
4 July	United States	Standard Shipbuilding Company	Shooters Island, New York	Morristown	Cargo ship	Requisitioned by United States Shipping Board.
4 July	United States	Schaw-Batcher Shipbuilding Company	South San Francisco, California	Nantahaka or Nantahala	Cargo ship	For United States Shipping Board.
4 July	United States	Baltimore Dry Dock and Shipbuilding Company	Baltimore, Maryland	Naiwa	Refrigerated cargo ship	For United States Shipping Board.
4 July	United States	Fulton Shipbuilding Company	Aberdeen, Washington	Necolah	Design 1003 ship	
4 July	United States	Sun Shipbuilding Company	Chester, Pennsylvania	Neponset	Cargo ship	Requisitioned by United States Shipping Board.
4 July	United States	Anderson Shipbuilding Company	Seattle, Washington	Osprey	Cargo ship	
4 July	United States	Texas Steamship Company	Bath, Maine	Sagadahoc	Cargo ship	Requisitioned by United States Shipping Board.
4 July	United States	William Cramp & Sons	Philadelphia, Pennsylvania	Santa Teresa	Passenger ship	Requisitioned by United States Shipping Board.
4 July	United States	Sloan Shipyards	Olympia, Washington	Sewickly	Design 1001 ship	
4 July	United States	Allen Shipbuilding Company	Seattle, Washington	Sosworth	Cargo ship	
4 July	United States	Newport News Shipbuilding	Newport News, Virginia	Thomas	Wickes-class destroyer	For United States Navy.
4 July	United States	William Cramp & Sons	Philadelphia, Pennsylvania	Upshur	Wickes-class destroyer	For United States Navy.
4 July	United States	Bethlehem Alameda	Alameda, California	Victorious	Cargo ship	Requisitioned by United States Shipping Board.
4 July	United States	Sommarstrom Shipbuilding	Columbia City, Oregon	Wanza	Design 1003 ship	
4 July	United States	Meacham & Babcock	Seattle, Washington	Wayucan	Cargo ship	
4 July	United States	J. F. Duthie & Company	Seattle, Washington	Western Cross	Cargo ship	Requisitioned by United States Shipping Board.
4 July	United States	J. F. Duthie & Company	Seattle, Washington	Western Star	Cargo ship	Requisitioned by United States Shipping Board.
4 July	United States	Los Angeles Shipbuilding and Dry Dock Company	San Pedro, California	West Galeta	Design 1013 ship	For United States Shipping Board.
4 July	United States	Skinner & Eddy	Seattle, Washington	West Gambo	Cargo ship	For United States Shipping Board.
4 July	United States	Los Angeles Shipbuilding and Dry Dock Company	San Pedro, California	West Grama	Design 1013 ship	For United States Shipping Board.
4 July	United States	Los Angeles Shipbuilding and Dry Dock Company	San Pedro, California	West Zula	Design 1013 ship	For United States Shipping Board.
4 July	United States	Fulton Shipbuilding Company	Aberdeen, Washington	Wihaha	Design 1001 ship	
4 July	United States	Union Iron Works	San Francisco, California	Williams	Wickes-class destroyer	For United States Navy.
4 July	United States	Moore Dry Dock Company	Oakland, California	Yamhill	Refrigerated cargo ship	For United States Shipping Board.
4 July	United States	Moore Dry Dock Company	Oakland, California	Yaquina	Refrigerated cargo ship	For United States Shipping Board.
5 July	United States	Puget Sound Bridge and Dredging Company	Seattle, Washington	Admiral Mayo	Auxiliary schooner	
6 July	United States	Grant Smith-Porter Ship Company	Portland, Oregon	Nashotah	Cargo ship	
6 July	United States	Columbia River Shipbuilding	Portland, Oregon	Western Coast	Cargo ship	For United States Shipping Board.
6 July	United Kingdom	Fairfield	Govan	Sirdar	S-class destroyer	
8 July	United States	Columbia Engineering Works	Portland, Oregon	Georgette	Schooner	
6 July	United States	Northwest Steel	Portland, Oregon	Western Maid	Cargo ship	Requisitioned by United States Shipping Board.
9 July	United States	Foundation Company	Portland, Oregon	Commandant de Rose	Cargo ship	
9 July	United States	St. Helens Shipbuilding Company	St. Helens, Oregon	John W. Wells	Schooner	
10 July	United States	Coast Shipbuilding Company	Portland, Oregon	Cabeza	Design 1001 ship	
10 July	United States	Standard Shipbuilding Company	Shooters Island, New York	Hickman	Cargo ship	Requisitioned by United States Shipping Board.
10 July	United Kingdom	Swan Hunter & Wigham Richardson,	Wallsend on Tyne	Splendid	S-class destroyer	
12 July	United States	G. M. Standifer Construction	Portland, Oregon	Arvonia	Cargo ship	
12 July	United States	G. M. Standifer Construction	Portland, Oregon	Belding	Cargo ship	
12 July	United States	G. M. Standifer Construction	Vancouver, Washington	Benzonia	Cargo ship	
12 July	United States	Coos Bay Shipbuilding Company	Marshfield, Oregon	Cohasset	Design 1003 ship	
12 July	United States	American Shipbuilding Company	Wyandotte, Michigan	Lake Gahona	Design 1020 ship	For United States Shipping Board.
12 July	United States	G. M. Standifer Construction	Portland, Oregon	Montezuma	Cargo ship	
12 July	United States	G. M. Standifer Construction	Vancouver, Washington	Moosebee	Cargo ship	
12 July	United States	G. M. Standifer Construction	Portland, Oregon	Umatilla	Cargo ship	
14 July	United States	Submarine Boat Corporation	Newark, New Jersey	Chetopa	Design 1023 ship	For United States Shipping Board.
16 July	United States	Supple-Ballin Shipbuilding	Portland, Oregon	Airlie	Cargo ship	For United States Shipping Board.
17 July	United States	Skinner & Eddy	Seattle, Washington	West Gotomska	Design 1013 ship	For United States Shipping Board.
19 July	United States	Todd Dry Dock and Construction Company	Tacoma, Washington	Puget Sound	Cargo ship	Requisitioned by United States Shipping Board.
20 July	United States	American Shipbuilding Company	Lorain, Ohio	Lake Elainore	Design 1020 ship	For United States Shipping Board.
20 July	United States	McDougall-Duluth Shipbuilding	Duluth, Minnesota	Lake Indian	Cargo ship	Requisitioned by United States Shipping Board.
20 July	United States	Saginaw Shipbuilding Company	Saginaw, Michigan	Lake Osweya	Design 1020 ship	For United States Shipping Board.
20 July	United States	Columbia River Shipbuilding	Portland, Oregon	Western Pride	Cargo ship	For United States Shipping Board.
21 July	United States	Sanderson & Porter	Raymond, Washington	Kenosha	Design 1001 ship	
21 July	United States	Fore River Shipbuilding	Quincy, Massachusetts	Lansdale	Wickes-class destroyer	For United States Navy
23 July	United States	Northwest Steel	Portland, Oregon	Western Comet	Cargo ship	Requisitioned by United States Shipping Board.
24 July	United States	Foundation Company	Portland, Oregon	General Baratier	Cargo ship	
24 July	United States	Foundation Company	Portland, Oregon	General Baratier	Cargo ship	
24 July	United States	Manitowoc Shipbuilding Company	Manitowoc, Wisconsin	Lake Linden	Cargo ship	Requisitioned by United States Shipping Board.
24 July	United States	Foundation Company	Tacoma, Washington	Toul	Cargo ship	
25 July	United States	Fore River Shipbuilding	Quincy, Massachusetts	AA-1	AA-1-class submarine	For United States Navy.
25 July	Australia	Cockatoo Island Dockyard	Sydney	Adelaide	Town-class cruiser	For Royal Australian Navy.
25 July	United States	Tacoma Shipbuilding Company	Tacoma, Washington	Fassett	Design 1001 ship	
25 July	United States	Seattle Construction and Dry Dock Company	Seattle, Washington	Gaffney	Cargo ship	
25 July	United States	American Shipbuilding Company	Cleveland, Ohio	Lake Hewes	Design 1020 ship	For United States Shipping Board.
25 July	United States	American Shipbuilding Company	Wyandotte, Michigan	Lake Ormoc	Design 1020 ship	For United States Shipping Board.
25 July	United States	Russell Shipbuilding Company	Portland, Maine	Okess	Cargo ship	For United States Shipping Board.
25 July	United States	Bath Iron Works	Bath, Maine	Philip	Wickes-class destroyer	For United States Navy.
26 July	United States	National Shipbuilding Company	Seattle, Washington	Brisk	Auxiliary schooner	
27 July	United States	Downey Shipbuilding Corporation	Staten Island, New York	Abron	Design 1017 ship	For United States Shipping Board.
27 July	United States	Patterson-MacDonald Shipbuilding Company	Seattle, Washington	Barringa	Cargo ship	
27 July	United States	Great Lakes Engineering Works	Ecorse, Michigan	Crawl Keys	Design 1042 ship	For United States Shipping Board.
27 July	United States	American Shipbuilding Company	Superior, Wisconsin	Lake Dancey	Design 1020 ship	For United States Shipping Board.
27 July	United States	Ames Shipbuilding and Dry Dock Company	Seattle, Washington	L.J. Drake	Tanker	Requisitioned by United States Shipping Board.
27 July	United States	Bethlehem Wilmington	Wilmington, Delaware	O. T. Waring	Tanker	Requisitioned by United States Shipping Board.
27 July	United Kingdom	Harland & Wolff	Belfast	War Envoy	AO tanker	For British Shipping Controller.
27 July	United States	Skinner & Eddy	Seattle, Washington	West Hobomac	Cargo ship	For United States Shipping Board.
27 July	Canada	Cameron-Genoa Mills Shipbuilders	Victoria	West Stikine	Cargo ship	
29 July	United States	J. F. Duthie & Company	Seattle, Washington	Western Hope	Cargo ship	Requisitioned by United States Shipping Board.
29 July	United States	G. M. Standifer Construction	Portland, Oregon	Kangi	Design 1001 ship	For United States Shipping Board.
30 July	United States	Great Lakes Engineering Works	Ashtabula, Ohio	Lake Marion	Cargo ship	Requisitioned by United States Shipping Board.
30 July	United States	Grant Smith-Porter Ship Company	Portland, Oregon	Tillamook	Design 1001 ship	
31 July	United States	American Shipbuilding Company	Chicago, Illinois	Lake Buckeye	Design 1020 ship	For United States Shipping Board.
31 July	United States	American Shipbuilding Company	Lorain, Ohio	Lake Garza	Design 1020 ship	For United States Shipping Board.
31 July	United States	McDougall-Duluth Shipbuilding	Duluth, Minnesota	Lake Orange	Cargo ship	Requisitioned by United States Shipping Board.

== August ==
Date	Ship	Class	Builder	Location	Country	Notes
1 August	United States	Coast Shipbuilding Company	Portland, Oregon	Cabura	Design 1001 ship	
1 August	United States	Supple-Ballin Shipbuilding	Portland, Oregon	Ashburn	Cargo ship	
3 August	United States	Toledo Shipbuilding Company	Toledo, Ohio	Calaveras	Design 1020 ship	For United States Shipping Board.
3 August	United States	Great Lakes Engineering Works	Ecorse, Michigan	Lake Gardner	Cargo ship	Requisitioned by United States Shipping Board.
4 August	United States	Grant Smith-Porter Ship Company	Portland, Oregon	Aiken	1001	For United States Shipping Board.
4 August	United States	Sun Shipbuilding Company	Chester, Pennsylvania	Deerfield	Cargo ship	Requisitioned by United States Shipping Board.
4 August	United States	Bethlehem Alameda	Alameda, California	Invincible	Cargo ship	Requisitioned by United States Shipping Board.
4 August	United States	Fore River Shipbuilding	Quincy, Massachusetts	Mahan	Wickes-class destroyer	For United States Navy.
5 August	United States	American International Shipbuilding	Hog Island, Pennsylvania	Quistconck	Design 1022 ship	For United States Shipping Board.
6 August	United States	Columbia Engineering Works	Portland, Oregon	Gardner Williams	Schooner	
7 August	United States	Manitowoc Shipbuilding Company	Manitowoc, Wisconsin	Corsicana	Design 1044 ship	For United States Shipping Board.
7 August	United States	Grant Smith-Porter Ship Company	Portland, Oregon	Nupolela	Design 1001ship	
7 August	United States	Ropner & Sons	Stockton-on-Tees	War Gnat	Cargo ship	For British Shipping Controller.
7 August	Germany	Bremer Vulkan	Vegesack	U-164	Type U-93 submarine	For Imperial German Navy.
8 August	United States	Grays Harbor Motorship Corporation	Aberdeen, Washington	Brookdale	Design 1005 ship	For United States Shipping Board.
8 August	United States	American Shipbuilding Company	Lorain, Ohio	Lake Deval	Design 1020 ship	For United States Shipping Board.
10 August	United States	Federal Shipbuilding	Kearny, New Jersey	Federal	Design 1037 ship	For United States Shipping Board.
10 August	United States	American Shipbuilding Company	Wyandotte, Michigan	Lake Akkra	Design 1020 ship	For United States Shipping Board.
10 August	United States	Globe Shipbuilding	Superior, Wisconsin	Lake Medford	Cargo ship	Requisitioned by United States Shipping Board.
10 August	United States	Columbia River Shipbuilding	Portland, Oregon	Western Plains	Cargo ship	For United States Shipping Board.
12 August	United States	Seaborn Shipyards	Tacoma, Washington	Wakanna	Design 1001 ship	
12 August	United States	Northwest Steel	Portland, Oregon	Western Scout	Cargo ship	Requisitioned by United States Shipping Board.
12 August	United States	Ames Shipbuilding and Dry Dock Company	Seattle, Washington	Westport	Cargo ship	Requisitioned by United States Shipping Board.
14 August	United States	Merchant Shipbuilding Corporation	Harriman, Pennsylvania	Watonwan	Design 1025 ship	For United States Shipping Board.
15 August	United States	Skinner & Eddy	Seattle, Washington	West Hosokie	Cargo ship	For United States Shipping Board.
17 August	United States	Bethlehem Sparrows Point	Sparrows Point, Maryland	Berwyn	Cargo ship	For United States Shipping Board.
17 August	United States	Pacific American Fisheries	Bellingham, Washington	Bobring	Design 1001 ship	
17 August	United States	Traylor Shipbuilding Corporation	Cornwells Heights, Pennsylvania	Buhlsan	Cargo ship	For United States Shipping Board.
17 August	United States	New York Shipbuilding	Camden, New Jersey	Doheny 3rd	Tanker	Requisitioned by Requisitioned by United States Shipping Board.
17 August	United States	American Shipbuilding Company	Superior, Wisconsin	Lake Agomak	Design 1020 ship	For United States Shipping Board.
17 August	United States	American Shipbuilding Company	Buffalo, New York	Lake Galera	Design 1020 ship	For United States Shipping Board.
17 August	United States	Los Angeles Shipbuilding and Dry Dock Company	San Pedro, California	West Erral	Design 1013 ship	For United States Shipping Board.
17 August	United States	Moore Dry Dock Company	Oakland, California	Zirkel	Cargo ship	For United States Shipping Board.
18 August	United States	American Shipbuilding Company	Cleveland, Ohio	Lake Alvada	Design 1020 ship	For United States Shipping Board.
19 August	United States	Grant Smith-Porter Ship Company	Portland, Oregon	Latoka	Design 1001 ship	
19 August	Canada	J. Coughlan & Sons	Vancouver	War Chief	Cargo ship	
20 August	United States	Peninsula Shipbuilding Company	Portland, Oregon	Braxton	Cargo ship	
20 August	Canada	Western Canada Shipyards	Vancouver	War Tanoo	Cargo ship	
21 August	United States	Foundation Company	Portland, Oregon	Colonel Driant	Auxiliary steamship	
21 August	United States	Foundation Company	Tacoma, Washington	Vimy	Auxiliary steamship	For United States Shipping Board.
21 August	Germany	Bremer Vulkan	Vegesack	U-165	Type U-93 submarine	For Imperial German Navy.
22 August	United Kingdom	John Brown & Company	Clydebank	Hood	Admiral-class battlecruiser	For Royal Navy.
22 August	United States	American Shipbuilding Company	Chicago, Illinois	Lake Fondulac	Design 1020 ship	For United States Shipping Board.
22 August	United States	American Shipbuilding Company	Lorain, Ohio	Lake Gaspar	Design 1020 ship	For United States Shipping Board.
22 August	United States	Nielson & Kelez Shipbuilding Company	Seattle, Washington	Octorara	Design 1001ship	For United States Shipping Board.
22 August	United States	Meacham & Babcock	Seattle, Washington	Toka	Design 1001 ship	For United States Shipping Board.
22 August	United Kingdom	Harland & Wolff	Belfast	War Snake	B-type cargo ship	For British Shipping Controller.
24 August	United States	Grant Smith-Porter Ship Company	Aberdeen, Washington	Anthera	Design 1001 ship	
24 August	United States	Bethlehem Sparrows Point	Sparrows Point, Maryland	Cape May	Cargo ship	Requisitioned by United States Shipping Board.
24 August	United States	American Shipbuilding Company	Wyandotte, Michigan	Lake Licking	Design 1020 ship	For United States Shipping Board.
24 August	United States	Great Lakes Engineering Works	Ashtabula, Ohio	Lake Maurepas	Cargo ship	Requisitioned by United States Shipping Board.
24 August	United States	Great Lakes Engineering Works	Ecorse, Michigan	Lakeville	Cargo ship	Requisitioned by United States Shipping Board.
24 August	United States	American International Shipbuilding	Hog Island, Pennsylvania	Saccarappa	Design 1022 ship	For United States Shipping Board.
24 August	Canada	Foundation Company	Victoria	War Camchin	Cargo ship	
24 August	Canada	New Westminster Construction Company	New Westminster	War Kitimat	Cargo ship	
24 August	United States	Moore Dry Dock Company	Oakland, California	Zaca	Cargo ship	
26 August	United States	Northwest Steel	Portland, Oregon	West View or Westview	Cargo ship	Requisitioned by United States Shipping Board.
26 August	United States	Allen Shipbuilding Company	Seattle, Washington	Bosworth	Cargo ship	
26 August	United States	Manitowoc Shipbuilding Company	Manitowoc, Wisconsin	Lake Wilson	Cargo ship	Requisitioned by United States Shipping Board.
26 August	United Kingdom	Craig, Taylor & Co. Ltd.	Stockton-on-Tees	War Finch	Cargo ship	For British Shipping Controller.
27 August	United States	Ames Shipbuilding and Dry Dock Company	Seattle, Washington	Westmead	Cargo ship	Requisitioned by United States Shipping Board.
28 August	United States	Grays Harbor Motorship Corporation	Aberdeen, Washington	Brookfield	Design 1005 ship	For United States Shipping Board.
28 August	United States	Schaw-Batcher Shipbuilding Company	South San Francisco, California	Oskaloosa	Cargo ship	
28 August	United States	Skinner & Eddy	Seattle, Washington	West Humhaw	Cargo ship	For United States Shipping Board.
29 August	United States	Grant Smith-Porter Ship Company	Portland, Oregon	Medford	Design 1001 ship	
29 August	United States	Globe Shipbuilding	Superior, Wisconsin	Lake Arline	Cargo ship	Requisitioned by United States Shipping Board.
31 August	United States	Toledo Shipbuilding Company	Toledo, Ohio	Calicorock	Design 1020 ship	For United States Shipping Board.
31 August	United States	Bethlehem Wilmington	Wilmington, Delaware	Chas. M. Everest	Tanker	Requisitioned by United States Shipping Board.
31 August	United States	Submarine Boat Corporation	Newark, New Jersey	Ingold	Design 1023 ship	For United States Shipping Board.
31 August	United States	American Shipbuilding Company	Lorain, Ohio	Lake Yelverton	Design 1020 ship	For United States Shipping Board.
31 August	United States	American Shipbuilding Company	Wyandotte, Michigan	Lake Ypsilanti	Design 1020 ship	For United States Shipping Board.
31 August	United States	Pusey & Jones	Wilmington, Delaware	Lynchburg	Cargo ship	Requisitioned by United States Shipping Board.
31 August	United States	Submarine Boat Corporation	Newark, New Jersey	Phoenix Bridge	Design 1023 ship	For United States Shipping Board.
31 August	United States	Long Beach Shipbuilding Company	Long Beach, California	Oshkosh	Design 1021 ship	For United States Shipping Board.
31 August	United States	Los Angeles Shipbuilding and Dry Dock Company	San Pedro, California	West Zucker	Design 1013 ship	For United States Shipping Board.

== September ==
Date	Ship	Class	Builder	Location	Country	Notes
1 September	United Kingdom	Richardson, Duck & Company		War Anglian	Tanker	For British Shipping Controller.
2 September	United States	Pusey & Jones	Gloucester, New Jersey	Brandywine	Tanker	Requisitioned by United States Shipping Board.
2 September	United States	Traylor Shipbuilding Corporation	Cornwells Heights, Pennsylvania	Bulana	Cargo ship	For United States Shipping Board.
2 September	United States	Albina Engine & Machine Works	Portland, Oregon	Cadaretta	Cargo ship	For United States Shipping Board.
2 September	United States	Newburgh Shipyards	Newburgh, New York	Newburgh	Design 1025 ship	For United States Shipping Board.
2 September	United States	Wilson Shipbuilding	Astoria, Oregon	Wakiki	Design 1001 ship	
2 September	United States	Fore River Shipbuilding	Quincy, Massachusetts	W. L. Steed	Tanker	Requisitioned by United States Shipping Board.
2 September	United States	American Shipbuilding Company	Chicago, Illinois	Lake Beacon	Design 1020 ship	For United States Shipping Board.
4 September	United States	Anderson Shipbuilding Company	Houghton, Washington	Oleander	Cargo ship	
5 September	United States	Newport News Shipbuilding	Newport News, Virginia	Agwidale	Tanker	Requisitioned by United States Shipping Board.
5 September	United Kingdom	Harland & Wolff	Belfast	St Bees	Tug	For Royal Navy.
5 September	United States	Newport News Shipbuilding	Newport News, Virginia	Tattnall	Wickes-class destroyer	For United States Navy.
5 September	United Kingdom	Sir Raylton Dixon & Co	Middlesbrough	War Palace	Cargo ship	For British Shipping Controller.
6 September	Germany	Bremer Vulkan	Vegesack	U-166	Type U-93 submarine	Intended for Imperial German Navy, but to French Navy as Jean Roulier.
7 September	United States	Downey Shipbuilding Corporation	Staten Island, New York	Osakis	Design 1017 ship	For United States Shipping Board.
7 September	United States	Federal Shipbuilding	Kearny, New Jersey	Piave	Design 1037 ship	For United States Shipping Board.
7 September	United States	New York Shipbuilding	Camden, New Jersey	Wm. N. Page	Collier	Requisitioned by United States Shipping Board.
8 September	United States	Foundation Company	Portland, Oregon	General Serret	Cargo ship	For United States Shipping Board.
9 September	United States	Rolph Shipbuilding Company	Eureka, California	Hesperian	Barquentine	For United States Shipping Board.
9 September	United States	Manitowoc Shipbuilding Company	Manitowoc, Wisconsin	Lake Kyttle	Design 1044 ship	For United States Shipping Board.
10 September	United States	Great Lakes Engineering Works	Ecorse, Michigan	Craincreek	Design 1042 ship	For United States Shipping Board.
10 September	United Kingdom	Fairfield	Govan	Somme	S-class destroyer	
11 September	United States	Saginaw Shipbuilding Company	Saginaw, Michigan	Lake Winooski	Design 1020 ship	For United States Shipping Board.
11 September	United States	Foundation Company	Tacoma, Washington	Republique	Cargo ship	
11 September	United States	Merchant Shipbuilding Corporation	Harriman, Pennsylvania	Wathena	Design 1025 ship	For United States Shipping Board.
12 September	United States	Staten Island Shipbuilding Company	Port Richmond, New York	Bar Harbor	Cargo ship	Requisitioned by United States Shipping Board.
12 September	United States	Submarine Boat Corporation	Newark, New Jersey	Chariot	Design 1023 ship	For United States Shipping Board.
12 September	United States	American Shipbuilding Company	Lorain, Ohio	Lake Zaliski	Design 1020 ship	For United States Shipping Board.
12 September	United States	Submarine Boat Corporation	Newark, New Jersey	Monana	Design 1023 ship	For United States Shipping Board.
12 September	United States	Skinner & Eddy	Seattle, Washington	West Lashaway	Cargo ship	For United States Shipping Board.
14 September	United States	American Shipbuilding Company	Wyandotte, Michigan	Goodspeed	Design 1020 ship	For United States Shipping Board.
14 September	United States	Grant Smith-Porter Ship Company		Kokoma	Design 1001 ship	
14 September	United States	Great Lakes Engineering Works	Ashtabula, Ohio	Lake Connersville	Design 1042 ship	For United States Shipping Board.
14 September	United States	American Shipbuilding Company	Cleveland, Ohio	Lake Govan	Design 1020 ship	For United States Shipping Board.
14 September	United States	Portland, Oregon	Foundation Company	Nancy	Cargo ship	For United States Shipping Board.
15 September	United States	Pusey & Jones	Gloucester, New Jersey	Castlepoint	Cargo ship	Requisitioned by United States Shipping Board.
16 September	Germany	Kaiserliche Werft	Kiel	Frauenlob	Cöln-class cruiser	For Imperial German Navy.
16 September	United States	Bethlehem Wilmington	Wilmington, Delaware	Tipton	Cargo ship	Requisitioned by United States Shipping Board.
17 September	United States	Bath Iron Works	Bath, Maine	Woolsey	Wickes-class destroyer	For United States Navy.
18 September	United States	Seaborn Shipyards	Tacoma, Washington	Dungeness	Design 1001 ship	
18 September	United States	Manitowoc Shipbuilding Company	Manitowoc, Wisconsin	Lake Corrales	Design 1044 ship	For United States Shipping Board.
18 September	United States	Ames Shipbuilding and Dry Dock Company	Seattle, Washington	West Cape	Cargo ship	Requisitioned by United States Shipping Board.
19 September	United States	American Shipbuilding Company	Wyandotte, Michigan	Goree	Design 1020 ship	For United States Shipping Board.
19 September	United States	Globe Shipbuilding	Superior, Wisconsin	Lake Contoocook	Design 1020 ship	For United States Shipping Board.
19 September	United Kingdom	Harland & Wolff	Belfast	War Icarus	G-type cargo ship	For British Shipping Controller.
20 September	United States	Wright Shipbuilding	Tacoma, Washington	Bowesmont	Design 1001 ship	
20 September	United States	Sloan Shipyards	Olympia, Washington	Nahnet	Cargo ship	
20 September	Germany	AG Vulcan	Hamburg	U-121	Type UE II submarine	For Imperial German Navy
21 September	United States	Great Lakes Engineering Works	Ecorse, Michigan	Cranenest	Design 1042 ship	For United States Shipping Board.
21 September	United Kingdom	British Construction Co. Ltd.	Barnstaple	Cretepath	Concrete barge	For British Shipping Controller.
21 September	United States	Grant Smith-Porter Ship Company	Aberdeen, Washington	Edith	Design 1001 ship	
21 September	United States	Grant Smith-Porter Ship Company	Portland, Oregon	Fort Stevens	Design 1001 ship	
21 September	United States	Benicia Shipbuilding Corporation	Benicia, California	Kimta	Design 1001 ship	
21 September	United States	Skinner & Eddy	Seattle, Washington	Little David	Tug	
21 September	United States	Fore River Shipbuilding	Quincy, Massachusetts	Nantasket	Cargo ship	Requisitioned by United States Shipping Board.
21 September	United States	Elliot Bay Shipbuilding Company	Seattle, Washington	Trolltint	Cargo ship	
21 September	United States	Skinner & Eddy	Seattle, Washington	West Cressey	Cargo ship	For United States Shipping Board.
21 September	United States	Skinner & Eddy	Seattle, Washington	West Loquassuck	Cargo ship	For United States Shipping Board.
21 September	United States	J. F. Duthie & Company	Seattle, Washington	West Pool	Cargo ship	Requisitioned by United States Shipping Board.
21 September	United States	Bethlehem Sparrows Point	Sparrows Point, Maryland	Wheaton	Cargo ship	Requisitioned by United States Shipping Board.
22 September	United States	Submarine Boat Corporation	Newark, New Jersey	Cokato	Design 1023 ship	For United States Shipping Board.
22 September	United States	Bethlehem Alameda	Alameda, California	Courageous	Cargo ship	Requisitioned by United States Shipping Board.
22 September	United States	Union Iron Works	San Francisco, California	Jose Rizal	Cargo ship	For United States Shipping Board.
22 September	United States	Moore Dry Dock Company	Oakland, California	Kameset	Cargo ship	
22 September	United States	Submarine Boat Corporation	Newark, New Jersey	Panola	Design 1023 ship	For United States Shipping Board.
22 September	United States	Union Iron Works	San Francisco, California	Renshaw	Cargo ship	
23 September	United States	Meacham & Babcock	Seattle, Washington	Afalkey	Design 1001 ship	
23 September	United States	American Shipbuilding Company	Lorain, Ohio	Lake Pickaway	Design 1020 ship	For United States Shipping Board.
23 September	United States	G. M. Standifer Construction	Portland, Oregon	Okiva	Design 1001 ship	
23 September	United States	Baltimore Dry Dock and Shipbuilding Company	Baltimore, Maryland	Polar Bear	Refrigerated cargo ship	Requisitioned by United States Shipping Board.
23 September	United Kingdom	Stephens	Linthouse, Glasgow	Sabre	S-class destroyer	
24 September	United States	Foundation Company	Portland, Oregon	Aviateur de Terlines	Cargo ship	
24 September	Canada	Lyall Shipbuilding Company	North Vancouver	J.N. Greenshields	Cargo ship	
24 September	United States	New York Shipbuilding	Camden, New Jersey	Santa Elisa	Troopship	Requisitioned by United States Shipping Board.
24 September	United Kingdom	Harland & Wolff	Belfast	War Aryan	AO tanker	For British Shipping Controller.
25 September	United States	Merachant Shipbuilding Corporation	Chester, Pennsylvania	Auburn	Cargo ship	For United States Shipping Board.
25 September	United States	Long Beach Shipbuilding Company	Long Beach, California	Magunkook	Design 1021 ship	For United States Shipping Board.
25 September	United Kingdom	I. J. Abdela & Mitchell Ltd.	Queensferry	Stephen Kenney	Naval trawler	For Royal Navy.
25 September	United States	Los Angeles Shipbuilding and Dry Dock Company	San Pedro, California	West Amargosa	Design 1013 ship	For United States Shipping Board.
26 September	United States	Great Lakes Engineering Works	Ecorse, Michigan	Craycroft	Design 1042 ship	For United States Shipping Board.
26 September	United States	American Shipbuilding Company	Cleveland, Ohio	Lake Fluvanna	Design 1020 ship	For United States Shipping Board.
26 September	United States	American Shipbuilding Company	Wyandotte, Michigan	Lake Gorin	Design 1020 ship	For United States Shipping Board.
28 September	United States	Grays Harbor Motorship Corporation	Aberdeen, Washington	Aberdeen	Design 1001 ship	For United States Shipping Board.
28 September	United States	Grant Smith-Porter Ship Company	Portland, Oregon	Bancroft	Design 1001 ship	For United States Shipping Board.
28 September	United States	Todd Dry Dock and Construction Company	Tacoma, Washington	Bellingham	Cargo ship	Requisitioned by United States Shipping Board.
28 September	United States	Toledo Shipbuilding Company	Toledo, Ohio	Calispell	Design 1020 ship	For United States Shipping Board.
28 September	United States	Baltimore Dry Dock and Shipbuilding Company	Baltimore, Maryland	Fort Wayne	Refrigerated cargo ship	For United States Shipping Board.
28 September	United States	Standard Shipbuilding Company	Shooters Island, New York	Monmouth	Cargo ship	Requisitioned by United States Shipping Board.
28 September	United States	Submarine Boat Corporation	Newark, New Jersey	Onekama	Design 1023 ship	For United States Shipping Board.
28 September	United States	Seattle North Pacific Shipbuilding Company	Seattle, Washington	Ozette	Cargo ship	
28 September	Canada	J. Coughlan & Sons	Vancouver	War Noble	Cargo ship	
28 September	Canada	Wallace Shipyards Ltd.	North Vancouver	War Storm	Cargo ship	
28 September	United States	Columbia River Shipbuilding	Portland, Oregon	Western Belle	Cargo ship	For United States Shipping Board.
29 September	United States	Grant Smith-Porter Ship Company	Portland, Oregon	Holbrook	Design 1001 ship	
29 September	United States	Bethlehem Alameda	Alameda, California	Triumph	Cargo ship	
30 September	United States	Nielson & Kelez Shipbuilding Company	Seattle, Washington	Adway	Design 1001 ship	For United States Shipping Board.
30 September	United States	Babare Brothers	Tacoma, Washington	Battincau or Bottineau	Design 1001 ship	
30 September	United States	American Shipbuilding Company	Lorain, Ohio	Lake Copley	Design 1020 ship	For United States Shipping Board.
30 September	United States	American Shipbuilding Company	Chicago, Illinois	Lake Desha	Design 1020 ship	For United States Shipping Board.
30 September	United States	American Shipbuilding Company	Wyandotte, Michigan	Lake Gormania	Design 1020 ship	For United States Shipping Board.
30 September	United States	American International Shipbuilding	Hog Island, Pennsylvania	Sac City	Design 1022 ship	For United States Shipping Board.
30 September	United States	Foundation Company	Tacoma, Washington	Souchez	Cargo ship	
30 September	Germany	Schiffsbau & Maschinenfabrik Hansa AG	Tönning	Viceadmiral E. Schmidt	Auxiliary naval vessel	For Imperial German Navy
September	United Kingdom	Blyth Shipbuilding & Dry Docks Co. Ltd	Blyth	War Haven	Cargo ship	For British Shipping Controller.

== October ==
Date	Ship	Class	Builder	Location	Country	Notes
1 October	United States	Pacific American Fisheries	Bellingham, Washington	Boconoff	Design 1001 ship	
1 October	United States	Grant Smith-Porter Ship Company	Portland, Oregon	Fort Scott	Design 1001 ship	
1 October	United Kingdom	Irvine's Shipbuilding & Dry Docks Co. Ltd.	West Hartlepool	War Sirocco	Cargo ship	For British Shipping Controller.
3 October	United States	Tacoma Shipbuilding Company	Tacoma, Washington	Wiea	Design 1001 ship	
5 October	United States	Sanderson & Porter	Raymond, Washington	Addison	Cargo ship	
5 October	United States	McEachern Shipbuilding Company	Astoria, Oregon	Flavel	Design 1003 ship	
5 October	United States	American Shipbuilding Company	Buffalo, New York	Lake Otsquage	Design 1020 ship	
5 October	United States	Pusey & Jones	Wilmington, Delaware	Marshall	Cargo ship	Requisitioned by United States Shipping Board.
5 October	United States	Skinner & Eddy	Seattle, Washington	West Madaket	Cargo ship	For United States Shipping Board.
6 October	United States	Submarine Boat Corporation	Newark, New Jersey	Hico	Design 1023 ship	For United States Shipping Board.
6 October	United States	Moore Dry Dock Company	Oakland, California	Kekettient	Cargo ship	
6 October	United States	Submarine Boat Corporation	Newark, New Jersey	Opelika	Design 1023 ship	For United States Shipping Board.
7 October	United States	Foundation Company	Tacoma, Washington	Egalite	Cargo ship	
7 October	United States	Great Lakes Engineering Works	Ashtabula, Ohio	Lake Crathorne	Design 1042 ship	For United States Shipping Board.
7 October	United States	Northwest Steel	Portland, Oregon	West Kyska	Design 1013 ship	For United States Shipping Board.
8 October	United States	F. Rodgers & Company	Astoria, Oregon	Capiness	Design 1001 ship	For United States Shipping Board.
9 October	United States	McDougall-Duluth Shipbuilding	Duluth, Minnesota	Cedar Spring	Design 1020 ship	For United States Shipping Board.
9 October	United States	American Shipbuilding Company	Lorain, Ohio	Lake Cahoon	Design 1020 ship	For United States Shipping Board.
10 October	United States	Federal Shipbuilding	Kearny, New Jersey	Mercer	Design 1037 ship	For United States Shipping Board.
12 October	United States	American Shipbuilding Company	Superior, Wisconsin	Lake Fostoria	Design 1093 ship	For United States Shipping Board.
12 October	United States	Federal Shipbuilding	Kearny, New Jersey	Marne	Design 1037 ship	For United States Shipping Board.
12 October	United States	Grant Smith-Porter Ship Company	Portland, Oregon	Nashotah	Design 1001 ship	
12 October	United States	Merchant Shipbuilding Corporation	Harriman, Pennsylvania	Waubesa	Design 1025 ship	For United States Shipping Board.
14 October	United States	Submarine Boat Corporation	Newark, New Jersey	Allies	Design 1023 ship	For United States Shipping Board.
14 October	United States	Submarine Boat Corporation	Newark, New Jersey	Consort	Design 1023 ship	For United States Shipping Board.
14 October	United States	Skinner & Eddy	Seattle, Washington	West Eldara	Cargo ship	For United States Shipping Board.
15 October	United States	American Shipbuilding Company	Cleveland, Ohio	Lake Farge	Design 1093 ship	For United States Shipping Board.
17 October	United States	Grays Harbor Motorship Corporation	Aberdeen, Washington	Brookhaven	Design 1005 ship	For United States Shipping Board.
17 October	United States	Great Lakes Engineering Works	Ecorse, Michigan	Lake Costello	Design 1060 ship	For United States Shipping Board.
17 October	United States	Los Angeles Shipbuilding and Dry Dock Company	San Pedro, California	West Arvada	Design 1013 ship	For United States Shipping Board.
18 October	United States	Albina Engine & Machine Works	Portland, Oregon	Caddopeak	Cargo ship	For United States Shipping Board.
19 October	United States	Globe Shipbuilding	Superior, Wisconsin	Contoocook	Design 1020 ship	For United States Shipping Board.
19 October	United States	Grant Smith-Porter Ship Company	Portland, Oregon	Fort Steward	Design 1001 ship	
19 October	United States	Saginaw Shipbuilding Company	Saginaw, Michigan	Lake Belnona	Design 1020 ship	For United States Shipping Board.
19 October	United States	Toledo Shipbuilding Company	Toledo, Ohio	Lake Calistoga	Design 1020 ship	For United States Shipping Board.
19 October	United States	American Shipbuilding Company	Chicago, Illinois	Lake Mattato	Design 1020 ship	For United States Shipping Board.
19 October	United States	Newburgh Shipyards	Newburgh, New York	New Windsor	Design 1025 ship	For United States Shipping Board.
19 October	United Kingdom	Harland & Wolff	Belfast	War Music	N-type cargo ship	For British Shipping Controller.
19 October	United States	Southwestern Shipbuilding Company	San Pedro, California	West Carnifax	Cargo ship	
19 October	United States	Skinner & Eddy	Seattle, Washington	West Mahomet	Cargo ship	For United States Shipping Board.
20 October	United States	Moore Dry Dock Company	Oakland, California	Chipchung	Cargo ship	
20 October	United States	Bethlehem Alameda	Alameda, California	Eclipse	Cargo ship	For United States Shipping Board.
21 October	United States	National Shipbuilding Company	Seattle, Washington	Bright	Cargo ship	For United States Shipping Board.
21 October	United States	American Shipbuilding Company	Lorain, Ohio	Lake Frampton	Design 1093 ship	For United States Shipping Board.
21 October	United Kingdom	Craig, Taylor & Co, Ltd.	Stockton-on-Tees	War Linnet	Cargo ship	For British Shipping Controller.
21 October	United Kingdom	Ropner & Sons	Stockton-on-Tees	War Mallow	Cargo ship	For British Shipping Controller.
22 October	United States	Great Lakes Engineering Works	Ecorse, Michigan	Lake Corydon	Design 1060 ship	For United States Shipping Board.
22 October	United States	American Shipbuilding Company	Superior, Wisconsin	Lake Fouche	Design 1093 ship	For United States Shipping Board.
23 October	United States	American Shipbuilding Company	Wyandotte, Michigan	Lake Grandon	Design 1093 ship	For United States Shipping Board.
23 October	United Kingdom	Swan Hunter & Wigham Richardson Limited	Wallsend	Stalwart	S-class destroyer	For Royal Australian Navy.
24 October	United States	Newport News Shipbuilding	Newport News, Virginia	F. D. Asche	Tanker	Requisitioned by United States Shipping Board.
25 October	United States	Grays Harbor Motorship Corporation	Aberdeen, Washington	Brookland	Design 1005 ship	For United States Shipping Board.
26 October	United States	Standard Shipbuilding Company	Shooters Island, New York	Belvidere	Cargo ship	Requisitioned by United States Shipping Board.
26 October	United States	Columbia River Shipbuilding	Portland, Oregon	West Cobalt	Cargo ship	For United States Shipping Board.
26 October	United States	Northwest Steel	Portland, Oregon	West Zeeda or West Zeda	Design 1013 ship	For United States Shipping Board.
26 October	United States	Todd Dry Dock and Construction Company	Tacoma, Washington	Yukon	Cargo ship	Requisitioned by United States Shipping Board.
29 October	United States	American Shipbuilding Company	Wyandotte, Michigan	Lake Graphite	Design 1093 ship	For United States Shipping Board.
29 October	United States	Sun Shipbuilding Company	Chester, Pennsylvania	South Bend	Cargo ship	For United States Shipping Board.
29 October	United States	American International Shipbuilding	Hog Island, Pennsylvania	Sacandaga	Design 1022 ship	For United States Shipping Board.
30 October	United States	Meacham & Babcock	Seattle, Washington	Ardena	Design 1001 ship	For United States Shipping Board.
30 October	United States	Bath Iron Works	Bath, Maine	Evans	Wickes-class destroyer	For United States Navy.
30 October	United States	Foundation Company	Tacoma, Washington	Justice	Cargo ship	
30 October	United States	Foundation Company	Portland, Oregon	Luneville	Cargo ship	
30 October	United States	Seattle North Pacific Shipbuilding Company	Seattle, Washington	Yaklok	Cargo ship	
31 October	United States	Toledo Shipbuilding Company	Toledo, Ohio	Lake Callicoon	Design 1020 ship	For United States Shipping Board.

== November ==
Date	Ship	Class	Builder	Location	Country	Notes
2 November	United States	Pacific American Fisheries	Bellingham, Washington	Bonneterre	Cargo ship	
2 November	United States	Manitowoc Shipbuilding Company	Manitowoc, Wisconsin	Coperas	Design 1044 ship	For United States Shipping Board.
2 November	United States	American Shipbuilding Company	Chicago, Illinois	Lake Gradan	Design 1093 ship	For United States Shipping Board.
3 November	United States	Fore River Shipbuilding	Quincy, Massachusetts	Cohasset	Cargo ship	Requisitioned by United States Shipping Board.
3 November	United States	Los Angeles Shipbuilding and Dry Dock Company	San Pedro, California	West Cajoot	Design 1013 ship	For United States Shipping Board.
3 November	United States	Schaw-Batcher Shipbuilding Company	South San Francisco, California	West Avala	Cargo ship	
4 November	United States	American Shipbuilding Company	Lorain, Ohio	Franconia	Design 1093 ship	For United States Shipping Board.
6 November	United States	American Shipbuilding Company	Wyandotte, Michigan	Lake Gratis	Design 1093 ship	For United States Shipping Board.
7 November	United States	Great Lakes Engineering Works	Ecorse, Michigan	Lake Cote Blanche	Design 1060 ship	For United States Shipping Board.
9 November	United States	Downey Shipbuilding Corporation	Staten Island, New York	Dio	Design 1017 ship	For United States Shipping Board.
9 November	United States	Texas Steamship Company	Bath, Maine	Dirigo	Tanker	Requisitioned by United States Shipping Board.
9 November	United States	Seattle, Washington	Skinner & Eddy	Edenton	Cargo ship	For United States Shipping Board.
9 November	United States	Groton Iron Works	Groton, Connecticut	Tollard	Design 1016 ship	For United States Shipping Board.
9 November	United States	Ames Shipbuilding and Drydock Company	Seattle, Washington	Western Ally	Cargo ship	Requisitioned by United States Shipping Board.
9 November	United States	Northwest Steel	Portland, Oregon	West Wauna	Design 1013 ship	For United States Shipping Board.
13 November	United States	American Shipbuilding Company	Wyandotte, Michigan	Lake Gravett	Design 1093 ship	For United States Shipping Board.
14 November	United States	Bethlehem Wilmington	Wilmington, Delaware	Norma	Cargo ship	Requisitioned by United States Shipping Board.
15 November	United States	Great Lakes Engineering Works	Ecorse, Michigan	Cotopaxi	Design 1060 ship	For United States Shipping Board.
16 November	United States	Pusey & Jones	Gloucester, New Jersey	Castlewood	Cargo ship	Requisitioned by United States Shipping Board.
16 November	United States	American Shipbuilding Company	Lorain, Ohio	Fray	Design 1093 ship	For United States Shipping Board.
16 November	United States	American Shipbuilding Company	Chicago, Illinois	Lake Grafton	Design 1093 ship	For United States Shipping Board.
16 November	United States	Globe Shipbuilding	Superior, Wisconsin	Conotton	Design 1020 ship	For United States Shipping Board.
17 November	United States	Grays Harbor Motorship Corporation	Aberdeen, Washington	Grayling	Design 1005 ship	For United States Shipping Board.
18 November	United States	Pusey & Jones	Gloucester, New Jersey	Henry Clay	Cargo ship	Requisitioned by United States Shipping Board.
19 November	United Kingdom	Sir Raylton Dixon & Co	Middlesbrough	Binfield	Cargo ship	For British India Steam Navigation Company.
22 November	United States	American International Shipbuilding	Hog Island, Pennsylvania	Saguache	Design 1022 ship	For United States Shipping Board.
22 November	United States	American International Shipbuilding	Hog Island, Pennsylvania	Sapmero	Design 1022 ship	For United States Shipping Board.
22 November	United Kingdom	William Beardmore and Company	Dalmuir	Tasmania	S-class destroyer	For Royal Navy.
22 November	United Kingdom	Harland & Wolff Ltd	Govan	War Cowslip	A-type cargo ship	For British Shipping Controller.
23 November	United States	Standard Shipbuilding Company	Shooters Island, New York	Aledo	Cargo ship	Requisitioned by United States Shipping Board.
23 November	United States	Submarine Boat Corporation	Newark, New Jersey	Chicago Bridge	Design 1023 ship	For United States Shipping Board.
23 November	United States	Submarine Boat Corporation	Newark, New Jersey	Decatur Bridge	Design 1023 ship	For United States Shipping Board.
23 November	United States	Skinner & Eddy	Seattle, Washington	Edgecombe	Cargo ship	For United States Shipping Board.
24 November	United States	Federal Shipbuilding	Kearny, New Jersey	The Lambs	Design 1037 ship	For United States Shipping Board.
26 November	United States	Seattle North Pacific Shipbuilding Company	Seattle, Washington	Iconium	Cargo ship	For United States Shipping Board.
27 November	United States	American Shipbuilding Company	Wyandotte, Michigan	Grattan	Design 1093 ship	For United States Shipping Board.
27 November	United States	Saginaw Shipbuilding Company	Saginaw, Michigan	Lilicusun	Design 1020 ship	For United States Shipping Board.
27 November	United States	Northwest Steel	Portland, Oregon	West Compo	Design 1013 ship	For United States Shipping Board.
27 November	United States	Columbia River Shipbuilding	Portland, Oregon	West Wauneke	Design 1013 ship	For United States Shipping Board.
30 November	United States	Albina Engine & Machine Works	Portland, Oregon	Callabasas	Cargo ship	For United States Shipping Board.
30 November	United States	Manitowoc Shipbuilding Company	Manitowoc, Wisconsin	Coquina	Design 1044 ship	For United States Shipping Board.
30 November	United States	Todd Dry Dock and Construction Company	Tacoma, Washington	Jacona	Design 1014 ship	For United States Shipping Board.
30 November	United States	Sun Shipbuilding Company	Chester, Pennsylvania	Marica	Troopship	Requisitioned by United States Shipping Board.
30 November	United States	Great Lakes Engineering Works	Ashtabula, Ohio	Cowan Shannock	Design 1060 ship	For United States Shipping Board.
30 November	United States	Pacific Coast Shipbuilding Company	Bay Point, California	Diablo	Design 1015 ship	For United States Shipping Board.
30 November	United Kingdom	Harland & Wolff	Belfast	St Mellons	Tug	For Royal Navy.

== December ==
Date	Ship	Class	Builder	Location	Country	Notes
1 December	United States	Los Angeles Shipbuilding and Dry Dock Company	San Pedro, California	West Conob	Design 1013 ship	For United States Shipping Board.
2 December	United Kingdom	Richardson, Duck & Company		War Pansy	Cargo ship	For British Shipping Controller.
4 December	United States	William Cramp & Sons	Philadelphia, Pennsylvania	Santa Malta	Troopship	Requisitioned by United States Shipping Board.
5 December	United States	Nielson & Kelez Shipbuilding Company	Seattle, Washington	Cineas	Design 1001 ship	For United States Shipping Board.
5 December	United Kingdom	Harland & Wolff	Belfast	War Dream	N-type cargo ship	For British Shipping Controller.
7 December	United States	Allen Shipbuilding Company	Seattle, Washington	Allenhurst	Cargo ship	
7 December	United States	American Shipbuilding Company	Wyandotte, Michigan	Gravella	Design 1093 ship	For United States Shipping Board.
7 December	United States	American Shipbuilding Company	Lorain, Ohio	Freeborn	Design 1093 ship	For United States Shipping Board.
9 December	United States	Pusey & Jones	Wilmington, Delaware	Moline	Cargo ship	Requisitioned by United States Shipping Board.
10 December	United States	Great Lakes Engineering Works	Ecorse, Michigan	Cottonwood	Design 1060 ship	For United States Shipping Board.
11 December	United States	Globe Shipbuilding	Superior, Wisconsin	Proctor	Design 1020 ship	For United States Shipping Board.
14 December	United States	Merchant Shipbuilding Corporation	Harriman, Pennsylvania	Cabegon	Design 1025 ship	For United States Shipping Board.
14 December	United States	Manitowoc Shipbuilding Company	Manitowoc, Wisconsin	Corapeak	Design 1044 ship	For United States Shipping Board.
14 December	United States	Ames Shipbuilding and Drydock Company	Seattle, Washington	Western Knight	Cargo ship	Requisitioned by United States Shipping Board.
14 December	United States	J. F. Duthie & Company	Seattle, Washington	West Helix	Cargo ship	For United States Shipping Board.
15 December	United States	Submarine Boat Corporation	Newark, New Jersey	Fort Pitt Bridge	Design 1023 ship	For United States Shipping Board.
15 December	United States	Submarine Boat Corporation	Newark, New Jersey	Mt. Vernon Bridge	Design 1023 ship	For United States Shipping Board.
17 December	United Kingdom	Harland & Wolff Ltd	Govan	War Jasmine	A-Type cargo ship	For British Shipping Controller.
18 December	United Kingdom	Craig, Taylor & Co. Ltd.	Stockton-on-Tees	Bradford City	Cargo ship	For St. Just Steamship Co.
18 December	United States	Grays Harbor Motorship Corporation	Aberdeen, Washington	Brookside	Design 1005 ship	For United States Shipping Board.
18 December	United States	Ropner & Sons	Stockton-on-Tees	War Pyramid	Cargo ship	For British Shipping Controller.
19 December	United Kingdom	Blyth Shipbuilding & Dry Docks Co. Ltd	Blyth	Merry Hampton	24-class sloop	For Royal Navy.
19 December	United States	New York Shipbuilding	Camden, New Jersey	Santa Leonora	Troopship	Requisitioned by United States Shipping Board.
19 December	United Kingdom	Harland & Wolff	Belfast	War Priam	G-type cargo ship	For British Shipping Controller.
20 December	United Kingdom	I. J. Abdela & Mitchell Ltd.	Queensferry	John Kennedy	Naval trawler	For Royal Navy.
21 December	United States	Bethlehem Wilmington	Wilmington, Delaware	Cabrille	Tanker	For United States Shipping Board.
21 December	United States	Todd Dry Dock and Construction Company	Tacoma, Washington	Cascade	Cargo ship	Requisitioned by United States Shipping Board.
21 December	United States	American Shipbuilding Company	Lorain, Ohio	Frecks	Design 1093 ship	For United States Shipping Board.
21 December	United States	Newburgh Shipyards	Newburgh, New York	Poughkeepsie	Design 1025 ship	For United States Shipping Board.
21 December	United States	Toledo Shipbuilding Company	Toledo, Ohio	Strabo	Design 1020 ship	For United States Shipping Board.
21 December	United States	Northwest Steel	Portland, Oregon	Western Modus	Design 1013 ship	For United States Shipping Board.
22 December	United States	Federal Shipbuilding	Kearny, New Jersey	Braddock	Design 1037 ship	For United States Shipping Board.
22 December	United States	Federal Shipbuilding	Kearny, New Jersey	Homestead	Design 1037 ship	For United States Shipping Board.
23 December	United States	American International Shipbuilding	Hog Island, Pennsylvania	Prusa	Design 1022 ship	For United States Shipping Board.
24 December	United States	Skinner & Eddy	Seattle, Washington	Edgehill	Cargo ship	For United States Shipping Board.
24 December	United States	American Shipbuilding Company	Wyandotte, Michigan	Gravity	Design 1093 ship	For United States Shipping Board.
27 December	United States	American International Shipbuilding	Hog Island, Pennsylvania	Sahale	Design 1022 ship	For United States Shipping Board.
27 December	United States	Great Lakes Engineering Works	Ecorse, Michigan	Council Bluffs	Design 1060 ship	For United States Shipping Board.
27 December	United Kingdom	Harland & Wolff	Belfast	St Olaves	Tug	For Royal Navy.
28 December	United States	Submarine Boat Corporation	Newark, New Jersey	Faraby	Design 1023 ship	For United States Shipping Board.
28 December	United States	Saginaw Shipbuilding Company	Saginaw, Michigan	Licoco	Design 1020 ship	For United States Shipping Board.
28 December	United States	Skinner & Eddy	Seattle, Washington	West Maximus	Design 1013 ship	For United States Shipping Board.
29 December	United States	American International Shipbuilding	Hog Island, Pennsylvania	Sagaporack	Design 1022 ship	For United States Shipping Board.
29 December	United States	Los Angeles Shipbuilding and Dry Dock Company	San Pedro, California	West Calumb	Design 1013 ship	For United States Shipping Board.
30 December	United States	Great Lakes Engineering Works	Ashtabula, Ohio	Cowboy	Design 1060 ship	For United States Shipping Board.
30 December	United States	Albina Engine & Machine WorksPortland, Oregon		Jacox	Cargo ship	For United States Shipping Board.
30 December	United States	American International Shipbuilding	Hog Island, Pennsylvania	Saco	Design 1022 ship	For United States Shipping Board.
31 December	United Kingdom	Irvine's Shipbuilding & Dry Docks Co, Ltd.	West Hartlepool	Bonnie	Cargo ship	For British & African Steam Navigation Co.
31 December	United States	G. M. Standifer Construction	Vancouver, Washington	Cokesit	Design 1015 ship	For United States Shipping Board.
31 December	United States	American Shipbuilding Company	Lorain, Ohio	Frazee	Design 1093 ship	For United States Shipping Board.
31 December	United States	Manitowoc Shipbuilding Company	Manitowoc, Wisconsin	Python	Design 1044 ship	For United States Shipping Board.
31 December	United States	American International Shipbuilding	Hog Island, Pennsylvania	Saluda	Design 1022 ship	For United States Shipping Board.
31 December	United States	American International Shipbuilding	Hog Island, Pennsylvania	Saucon	Design 1022 ship	For United States Shipping Board.
31 December	United Kingdom	William Beardmore and Company	Dalmuir	Tattoo	S-class destroyer	For Royal Australian Navy.
31 December	United States	Southwestern Shipbuilding Company	San Pedro, California	West Caruth	Design 1019 ship	For United States Shipping Board.
31 December	United States	Columbia River Shipbuilding	Portland, Oregon	West Corum	Design 1013 ship	For United States Shipping Board.
31 December	United States	Ames Shipbuilding and Drydock Company	Seattle, Washington	Western Glen	Cargo ship	Requisitioned by United States Shipping Board.
December	United Kingdom	British Construction Co. Ltd.	Barnstaple	Cretepond	Concrete barge	For British Shipping Controller.

== Unknown date ==
Date	Ship	Class	Builder	Location	Country	Notes
1st quarter 1918	United Kingdom	I. J. Abdela & Mitchell Ltd.	Queensferry	John Dupuis	Naval trawler	For Royal Navy.
Unknown date	Netherlands	Gebroeders Fikkers	Muntendam	Amsterdam	Fishing trawler	
Unknown date	United Kingdom	J. W. Brooke & Co. Ltd.	Lowestoft	A.S.318	Tug	For Inland Waterways Transport Directorate.
Unknown date	United Kingdom	J. W. Brooke & Co. Ltd.	Lowestoft	A.S.319	Tug	For Inland Waterways Transport Directorate.
Unknown date	United States	Alabama Drydock and Shipbuilding Company	Mobile, Alabama	Banago	Design 1001 ship	For United States Shipping Board.
Unknown date	United Kingdom	Short Brothers Ltd.	Sunderland	Celtic Prince	Cargo ship	For Prince Line Ltd.
Unknown date	France	Canadian Car and Foundry	Fort William, Ontario	Cerisoles	Minesweeper	Lost on maiden voyage.
Unknown date	United Kingdom	J. W. Brooke & Co. Ltd.	Lowestoft	Forked Lightning	Naval drifter / minesweeper	For Royal Navy.
Unknown date	United Kingdom	Short Brothers Ltd.	Sunderland	Gaelic Prince	Cargo ship	For Prince Line Ltd.
Unknown date	United Kingdom	I. J. Abdela & Mitchell Ltd.	Queensferry	Henry Flight	Naval trawler	For Royal Navy.
Unknown date	France	Canadian Car and Foundry	Fort William, Ontario	Inkerman	Minesweeper	Lost on maiden voyage.
Unknown date	Germany	H C Stülcken Sohn	Hamburg	Malmö	Coaster	For Bismark Linie GmbH.
Unknown date	United States	Alabama Drydock and Shipbuilding Company	Mobile, Alabama	Rena A. Murphy	Schooner	For J. G. Murphy.
Unknown date	United Kingdom	Blyth Shipbuilding & Dry Docks Co. Ltd	Blyth	Roseden	Cargo ship	For Stephens, Sutton & Stephens.
Unknown date	United Kingdom	J. W. Brooke & Co. Ltd.	Lowestoft	Shower	Naval drifter	For Royal Navy.
Unknown date	United Kingdom	J. W. Brooke & Co. Ltd.	Lowestoft	Sleet	Naval drifter	For Royal Navy.
Unknown date	United States	Irvine's Shipbuilding & Dry Docks Co, Ltd.	West Hartlepool	War Brae	Cargo ship	For British Shipping Controller.
Unknown date	United Kingdom	Tyne Iron Shipbuilding Co. Ltd.	Newcastle upon Tyne	War Combe	Cargo ship	For British Shipping Controller.
Unknown date	United Kingdom	Harland & Wolff Ltd.	Belfast	War Expert	Cargo ship	For British Shipping Controller.
Unknown date	United States	Irvine's Shipbuilding & Dry Docks Co, Ltd.	West Hartlepool	War Ghurka	Tanker	For British Shipping Controller.
Unknown date	United States	Irvine's Shipbuilding & Dry Docks Co, Ltd.	West Hartlepool	War Simoom	Cargo ship	For British Shipping Controller.

== Sources ==
- Friedman, Norman (2009). British Destroyers: From Earliest Days to the Second World War. Barnsley, UK: Seaforth Publishing. ISBN 978-1-84832-049-9.
- Gröner, Erich; Jung, Dieter; Maass, Martin (1985). Die deutschen Kriegsschiffe 1915–1945: Band 3: U-Boote, Hilfskreuzer, Minienschiffe, netzlager, Sperrbrecher (in German). Koblenz: Bernard & Graefe Verlag. ISBN 3-7637-4802-4.
- Mitchell, W. H.; Sawyer, L. A. (1968). British Standard Ships of World War I. Wartime Standard Ships. Vol. Three. Liverpool: Sea Breezes.
- Mitchell, WH; Sawyer, LA (1990). The Empire Ships (Second ed.). London, New York, Hamburg, Hong Kong: Lloyd's of London Press Ltd. ISBN 1-85044-275-4.
