= Design 1003 ship =

Wood-hulled cargo ship design

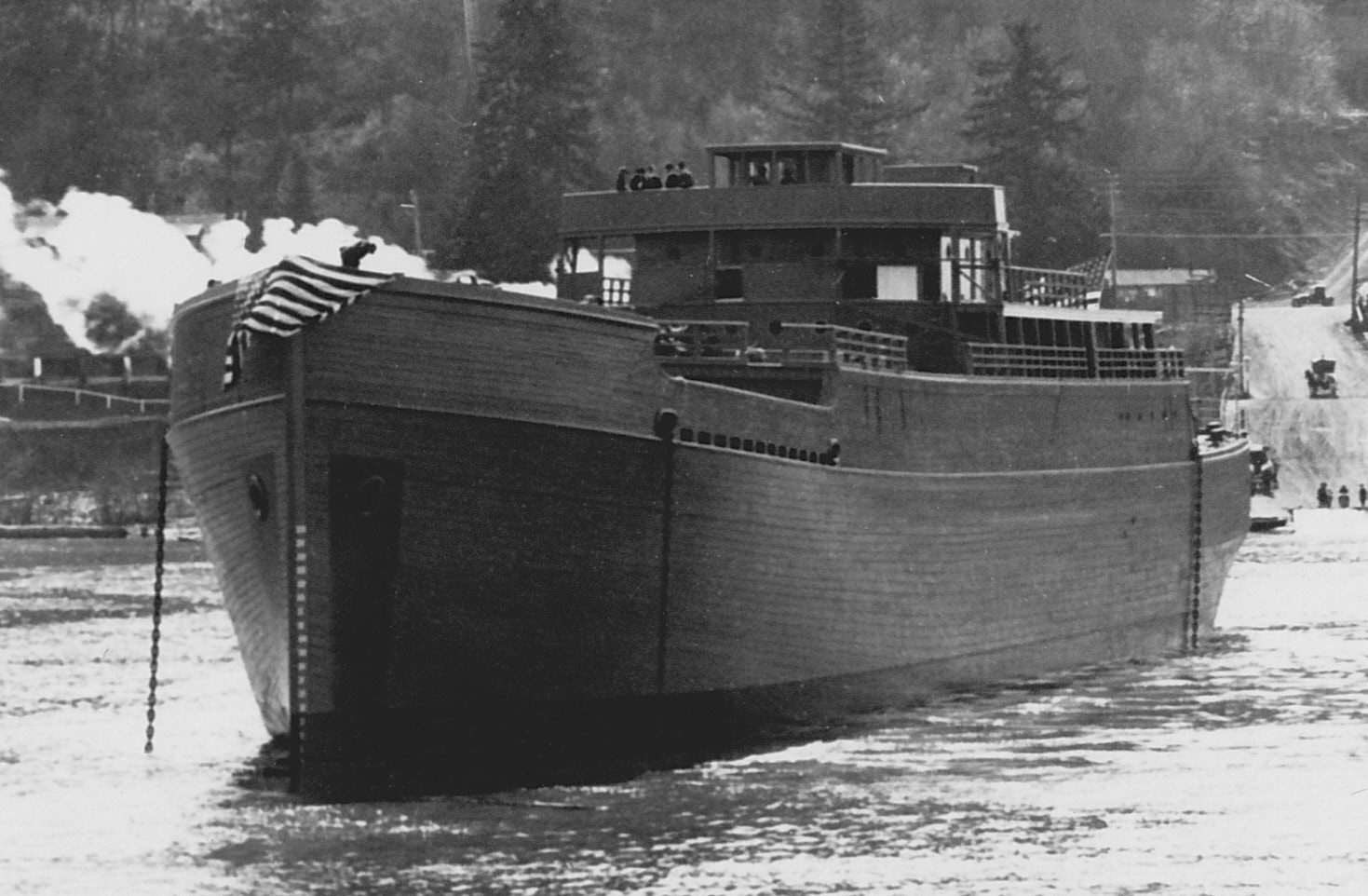
- SS Dumaru in the Willamette River, Portland, Oregon, on April 17, 1918.

Class overview
- Name: EFC Design 1003
- Built: 1918–19 (USSB)

General characteristics
- Type: Cargo ship
- Tonnage: 4,005 dwt
- Length: 288 ft 0 in (87.78 m)
- Beam: 45 ft 2 in (13.77 m)
- Draft: 28 ft 0 in (8.53 m)
- Installed power: 198 nhp
- Propulsion: triple-expansion engines, single screw

The Design 1003 ship (full name Emergency Fleet Corporation Design 1003) was a wood-hulled cargo ship design approved for production by the United States Shipping Board's Emergency Fleet Corporation (EFC) in World War I. They were referred to as the "Hough"-type. Most ships were completed in 1918 or 1919. Many ships were completed as barges or as hulls.
