= Globe Shipbuilding =

Globe Shipbuilding may refer to:

- Globe Shipbuilding and Dry Dock Company of Maryland, former name of Maryland Drydock Company
- Globe Shipbuilding Company was a shipyard and company located in Superior, Wisconsin, active during World War I and revitalized during World War II. The yard constructed vessels for the United States Shipping Board during World War I and later built ships under federal contract during World War II. The site later became the subject of historical preservation efforts.
