= Design 1021 ship =

World War I steel-hulled cargo ship design

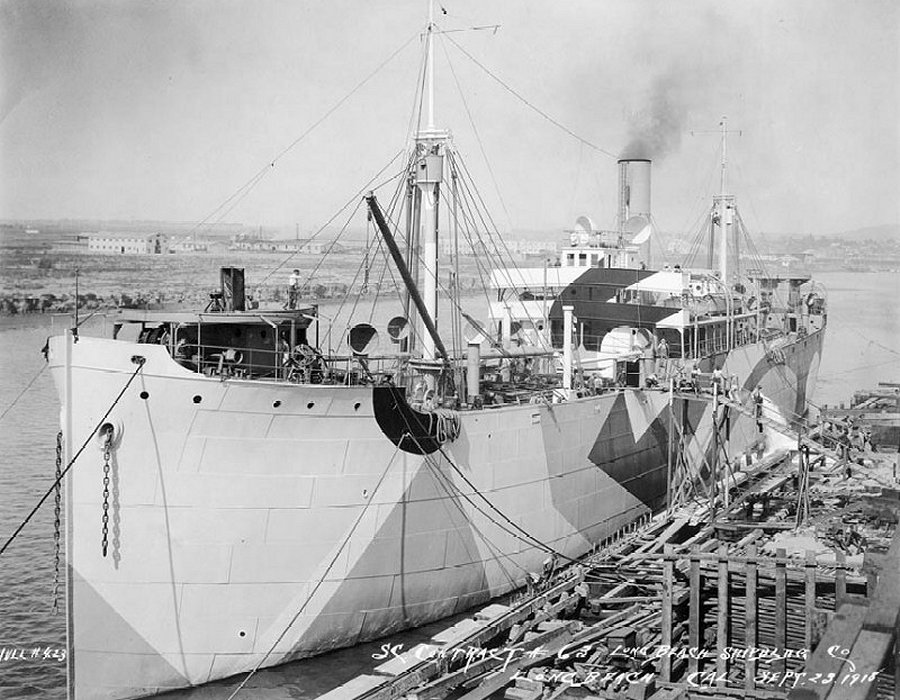
- USS Ozaukee (ID-3439) fitting out at the shipyard of the Long Beach Shipbuilding Company on 23 September 1918.

Class overview
- Name: EFC Design 1021
- Builders: Long Beach Shipbuilding Company
- Built: 1918–1919 (USSB)

General characteristics
- Type: Cargo ship
- Tonnage: 6,000 dwt
- Length: 340 ft 5 in (103.76 m)
- Beam: 48 ft 0 in (14.63 m)
- Draft: 27 ft 2 in (8.28 m)
- Propulsion: Turbine, oil fuel

The Design 1021 ship (full name Emergency Fleet Corporation Design 1021) was a steel-hulled cargo ship design approved for production by the United States Shipping Board's Emergency Fleet Corporation (EFC) in World War I. They were referred to as the "Long Beach-type" as they were built by Long Beach Shipbuilding Company in Long Beach, California. Three ships were completed for the USSB in 1918 and 1919.

== Bibliography ==
- McKellar, Norman L. "Steel Shipbuilding under the U. S. Shipping Board, 1917-1921, Part II, Contract Steel Ships" (PDF). Steel Shipbuilding under the U. S. Shipping Board, 1917-1921. ShipScribe.
