= USS West Zula =

Cargo ship of the United States Navy

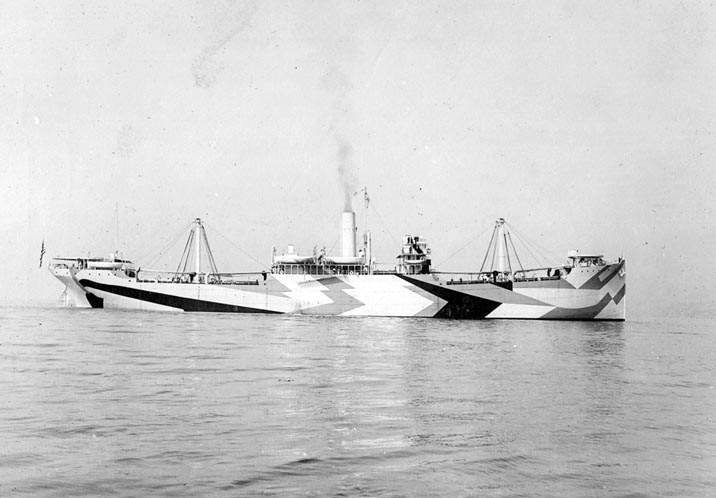
- SS West Zula underway ca. September 1918, probably during her builder's trials, and prior to her acquisition by the United States Navy for service as USS West Zula (ID-3501). She is painted in dazzle camouflage.

History

United States
- Name: USS West Zula
- Namesake: Previous name retained
- Builder: Los Angeles Shipbuilding and Drydock Company, San Pedro, Los Angeles
- Launched: 4 July 1918
- Completed: September 1918
- Acquired: 26 September 1918
- Commissioned: 26 September 1918
- Decommissioned: 24 February 1919
- Stricken: 24 February 1919
- Fate: Transferred to United States Shipping Board 24 February 1919; In reserve 1919–1933; Abandoned 1933, scrapped 1937

General characteristics
- Type: Design 1013 ship (cargo ship)
- Tonnage: 6,000 Gross register tons
- Displacement: 12,287 tons
- Length: 423 ft 9 in (129.16 m)
- Beam: 54 ft (16 m)
- Draft: 24 ft 2 in (7.37 m)
- Propulsion: Steam engine
- Speed: 10.5 knots
- Complement: 71
- Armament: None

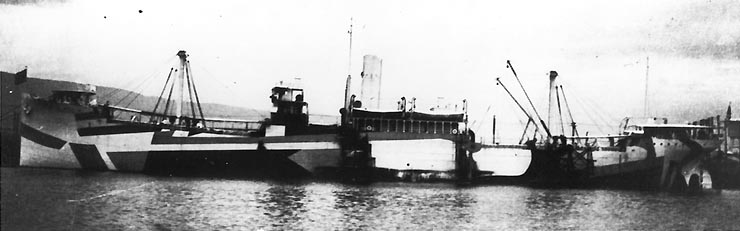
SS West Zula in port ca. September 1918, probably at the time of her completion by the Los Angeles Shipbuilding and Dry Dock Company of San Pedro, Los Angeles, and prior to her acquisition by the United States Navy for service as USS West Zula (ID-3501). She is painted in dazzle camouflage.

USS West Zula (ID-3501) was a United States Navy cargo ship in commission from 1918 to 1919.

== Construction, acquisition, and commissioning ==
West Zula was built as the commercial cargo ship SS West Zula by the Los Angeles Shipbuilding and Drydock Company at San Pedro, Los Angeles, for the United States Shipping Board. Launched on 4 July 1918, she was completed in September 1918, and the U.S. Navy acquired her from the Shipping Board on 26 September 1918. Assigned the naval registry identification number 3501, she was commissioned that day as USS West Zula (ID-3501) at San Pedro, California.

== Operational history ==
Assigned to the Naval Overseas Transportation Service, West Zula conducted sea trials and then departed for Chile. She loaded a cargo of guano at Arica, Chile, got underway on 22 November 1918, and proceeded via the Panama Canal toward New York City. After passing through the canal, however, she was re-routed to Jacksonville, Florida, where she unloaded her cargo of nitrates before steaming on to Philadelphia, Pennsylvania, for repairs which lasted until the end of January 1919.

Shifting to New York City on 31 January 1919, West Zula underwent further repairs there before she was decommissioned on 24 February 1919. She was returned to the Shipping Board that day and simultaneously stricken from the Navy List.

Once again SS West Zula, she was berthed in the Shipping Board's reserve fleet at Norfolk, Virginia. While she was laid up there, she deteriorated until she was abandoned in 1933.
