= USS Nantahala (ID-3519) =

Cargo ship of the United States Navy

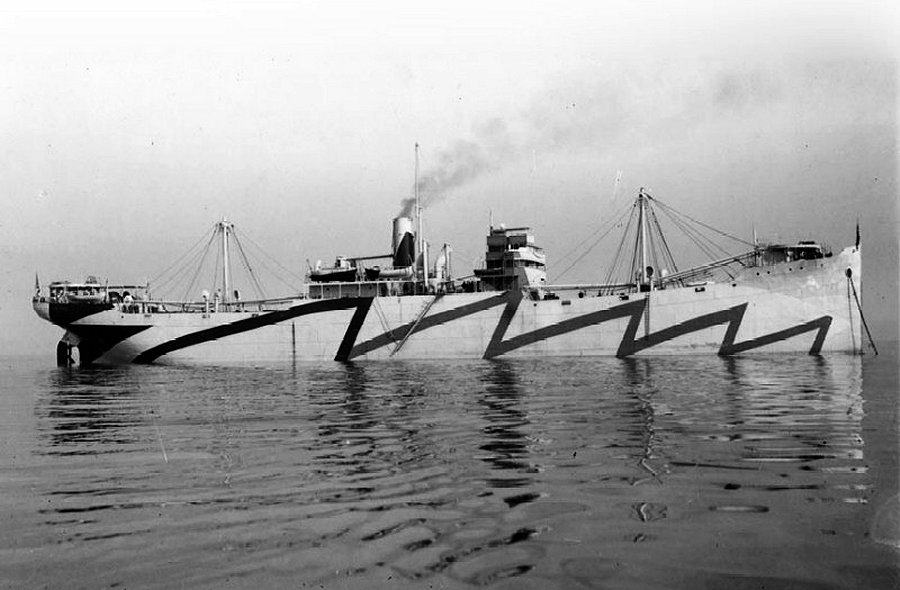
- SS Nantahala at anchor on 30 October 1918 during her sea trials. She is painted in dazzle camouflage.

History

United States
- Name: USS Nantahala
- Namesake: Previous name retained
- Builder: Western Pipe and Steel Company, San Francisco, California,
- Launched: 4 July 1918
- Acquired: 16 November 1918
- Commissioned: 16 November 1918
- Decommissioned: 17 April 1919
- Fate: Transferred to U.S. Shipping Board 30 April 1919; Scrapped 1929

General characteristics
- Type: Design 1019 cargo ship
- Tonnage: 5,895 GRT
- Displacement: 12,250 long tons (12,447 t)
- Length: 427 ft (130 m)
- Beam: 54 ft (16 m)
- Draft: 24 ft 2 in (7.37 m)
- Propulsion: Steam engine, one shaft
- Speed: 11 knots (20 km/h; 13 mph)
- Complement: 72

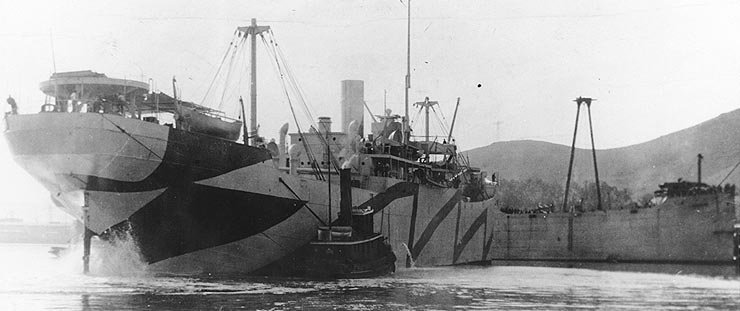
SS Nantahala off San Francisco, California, when first completed, ca. summer 1918. She is painted in dazzle camouflage. The tug Sea Fox is alongside.

The first USS Nantahala (ID-3519) was a United States Navy cargo ship in commission from 1918 to 1919.

== Construction, acquisition, and commissioning ==
Nantahala was constructed as the commercial single-screw cargo ship SS Wautahala for the United States Shipping Board by the Western Pipe and Steel Company at San Francisco, California. Later renamed SS Nantahala, she was launched on 4 July 1918. Transferred to the U.S. Navy on 16 November 1918, she was assigned the naval registry identification number 3519 and commissioned the same day as USS Nantahala (ID-3519).

== Operational history ==
Assigned to the Naval Overseas Transportation Service, Nantahala loaded a cargo of flour and departed the United States West Coast on 5 December 1918 bound for New York City, where she arrived on 31 December 1918. Assigned to duty as a food relief ship, she got underway for the Mediterranean Sea on 9 January 1919 and reached Fiume in mid-February 1919 with her cargo of flour and foodstuffs, which she delivered to help in the relief of starvation in Eastern Europe in the aftermath of World War I.

Nantahala operated in the Adriatic Sea and the central Mediterranean during the next month, then steamed to Gibraltar, from which she left for New York City, where she arrived on 10 April 1919.

== Decommissioning and disposal ==
Nantahala was decommissioned at New York City on 17 April 1919, and the Navy returned her to the U.S. Shipping Board on the 30 April 1919. Once again SS Nantahala, she remained in Shipping Board custody until scrapped at Baltimore, Maryland, in 1929.
