= USS Cape Lookout =

Cargo ship of the United States Navy

History

United States
- Name: USS Cape Lookout
- Builder: Bethlehem Shipbuilding Corporation, Sparrows Point, Maryland
- Launched: 22 June 1918
- Commissioned: 26 July 1918
- Decommissioned: 7 April 1919
- Fate: Sold 1920, broken up 1953

General characteristics
- Type: AK-type cargo ship
- Displacement: 10,505 long tons (10,674 t)
- Length: 391 ft 9 in (119.41 m)
- Beam: 52 ft (16 m)
- Draft: 23 ft 11 in (7.29 m)
- Speed: 11 knots (13 mph; 20 km/h)
- Complement: 62
- Armament: 1 × 6 in (150 mm) gun; 1 × 3 in (76 mm) gun

USS Cape Lookout was a supply ship in the United States Navy. She was named by the U.S. Navy for Cape Lookout, which are points on the coasts of both North Carolina and Washington.

Cape Lookout (No. 3214) was launched in 1918 by Bethlehem Shipbuilding Corp., Sparrows Point, Maryland; acquired by the Navy 26 July 1918; commissioned the same day and reported to the Naval Overseas Transportation Service.

== Atlantic Ocean operations ==
Between 10 August and 12 December 1918, Cape Lookout made two transatlantic voyages between Baltimore and New York and French ports, carrying supplies for the American Expeditionary Force. The cargo ship sailed from Baltimore on 24 January 1919, carrying 5,864 tons of flour to Trieste, Austria, as part of the relief assistance provided for the rebuilding of war-shattered Europe by the United States Food Administration. While homeward-bound Cape Lookout answered a distress call from US Army Transportation Corps ship USAT Melrose which had a disabled rudder. Cape Lookout took Melrose in tow for two days, until the latter could make repairs and proceed unassisted.

== Decommissioning ==
Cape Lookout returned to Baltimore 29 March 1919, and was decommissioned there 7 April 1919. She was returned to the Shipping Board the same day.
