= Design 1005 ship =

Wood-hulled cargo ship design

Class overview
- Name: EFC Design 1005
- Builders: Grays Harbor Motorship Company, Aberdeen, Washington
- Built: 1918–19 (USSB)
- Planned: 17
- Completed: 17

General characteristics
- Type: Cargo ship
- Tonnage: 2,924 gross tons 4,000 dwt
- Length: 272.1 ft (82.9 m)
- Beam: 48.4 ft (14.8 m)
- Depth: 25.7 ft (7.8 m)
- Installed power: 1400 indicated horsepower 324 nhp
- Propulsion: twin screw, coal fuel
- Complement: 47

The Design 1005 ship (full name Emergency Fleet Corporation Design 1005) was a wood-hulled cargo ship design approved for production by the United States Shipping Board's Emergency Fleet Corporation (EFC) in World War I. The ships were referred to as the "Grays Harbor"-type as all were built by the Grays Harbor Motorship Company in Aberdeen, Washington or the "Ward"-type after their designer M. R. Ward. The first ship of the class, the SS Wishkah, was listed at 2,924 gross tons with dimensions of 272.1 x 48.4 x 25.7, 1400 indicated horsepower, and carried a crew of 47. The class does not include the four Design 1116 cargo ships also designed by Ward and completed at the shipyard as they were a modified design at 3,132 gross tons and 5,000 tons deadweight. All ships were completed in 1918 or 1919.

Of the 17 ships ordered, all were completed and delivered to the USSB.
