= SS West Arvada =

American cargo ship (1919–1919)

History

United States
- Name: West Arvada
- Owner: United States Shipping Board
- Builder: Todd Pacific Shipyards, Los Angeles Division
- Launched: 17 October 1918
- Out of service: 16 September 1919
- Fate: Wrecked at Terschelling, the Netherlands on 16 September 1919

General characteristics
- Type: Steamship
- Tonnage: 6,044 GRT
- Length: 124 m (406 ft 10 in)
- Beam: 16 m (52 ft 6 in)
- Crew: 48

SS West Arvada was a 124-metre (406 ft 10 in)-long American cargo steamship. She was built by Todd Pacific Shipyards, Los Angeles Division and owned by United States Shipping Board. During the night of 15–16 September 1919, the ship sank due to naval mines near Terschelling, the Netherlands. One Polish crew member, Stoker D.F. Lavendoski, died.

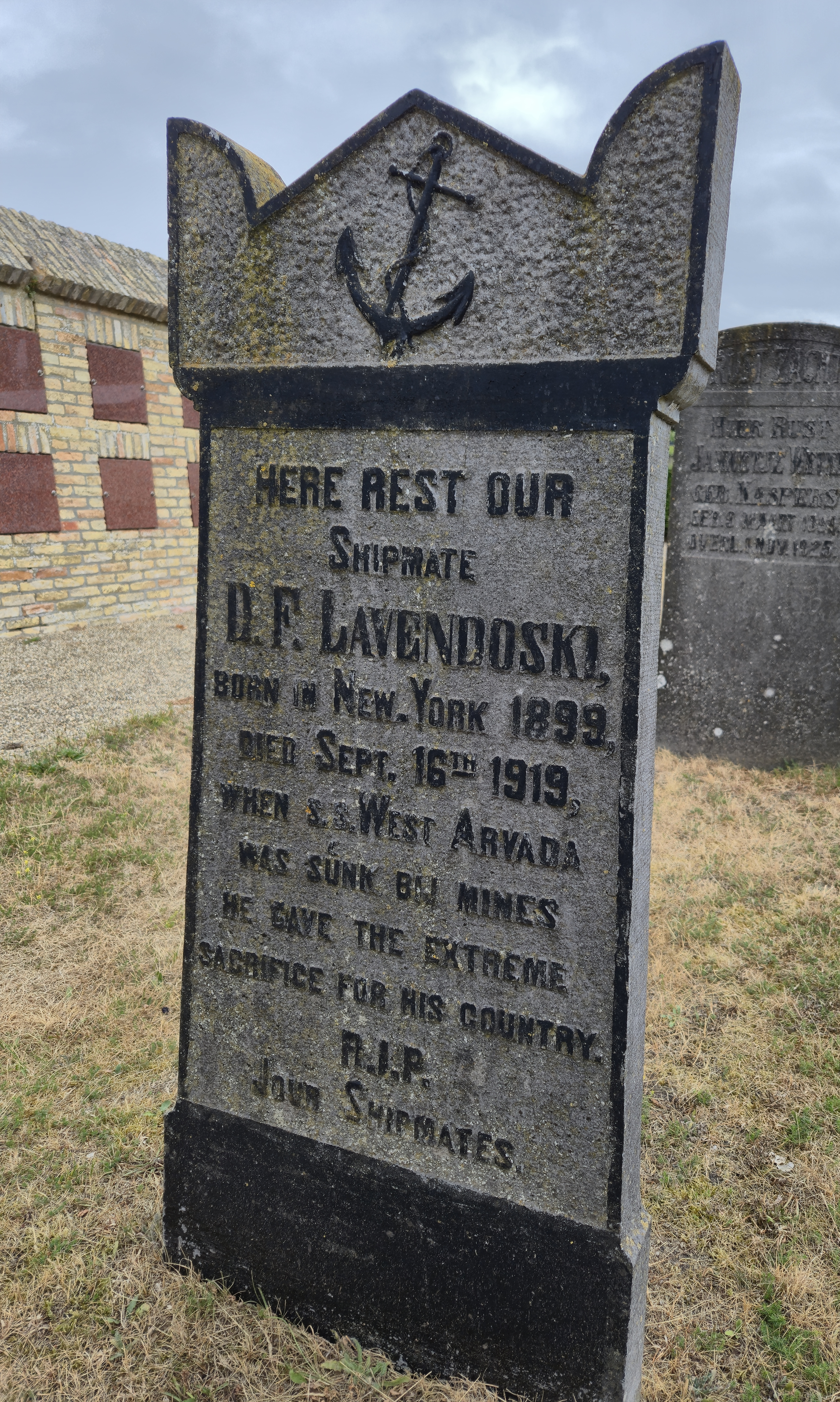
Gravestone of D.F. Lavendoski

The leaking fuel oil from the ship caused many bird deaths. Washed up cotton was sold in 1922. Until 1926, salvage operations were carried out to get cotton from the wreck. Although the position of the wreck was published at the time, it could not be found by divers in 2010.

== Ship details ==
The steel cargo ship was built in 1918 by Todd Pacific Shipyards, Los Angeles Division with the yard number 12 and owned by United States Shipping Board. She was 124 metres (406 ft 10 in) long and had a width of 16 m (52 ft 6 in). She had tonnage of 6,044 gross register tons (GRT). The vessel was propelled by a single screw engine and had a speed of 10.5 knots (19.4 km/h; 12.1 mph). The ship was registered with the Official number 217763.

== Fate ==
In September 1919 she was on voyage from Galveston, United States to Bremen, Germany, with a cargo of 22,000 bales of cotton with a value of 21 million guilder under command of S. Crosby. During the night of 15 to 16 September 1919 she was sailing through a minefield around 16 miles (26 km) northeast of Terschelling, the Netherlands. The second mine the boat struck set fire to the ship's oil and the cotton. The crew went into lifeboats and were picked up by the tugboat Volharding that was the first to reach the ship. Two more mines exploded and ten persons were thrown overboard. The ship Brandaris came from the Terschelling Rescue Committee, which had received a message at 1:45am via Scheveningen that a ship was sinking. The Brandaris took over the 37 people and brought them to Terschelling. 47 people were saved. One Polish stoker, D.F. Lavendoski, was reported missing, who probably fell overboard during the last mine explosion. His body was later found in the water and buried at the old cemetery under lighthouse Brandaris. During the morning the masts and chimney were still visible above the water.

== Aftermath ==
=== Oil disaster ===
The leaking fuel oil from the ship caused many bird deaths.

=== Salvage ===
A lot of cotton washed ashore. In 1922, 400 salvaged bales of cotton were sold for 81,000 guilders, of which the salvagers received 21,000 guilders. A diving investigation was initiated to see whether a salvage operation was worth it. It turned out that the stern had been destroyed by the explosion and a large part of the cargo had floated away. The fore holds were still closed with cotton inside. The British salvage company Reno Marine Salvage Corporation worked for two years until late 1925 to salvage the cotton with the vessel Gundreda and later with the vessel Resource. After a new research by a diver in 1926, it turned out the bow was damaged due to a storm. The water had expanded the cotton, and it was said that the only way to get it out was to blow up the bow with dynamite. In July 1926 a no cure no pay salvage contract for Dros-Doeksen was concluded by Lloyds in London. Between July and September 1926 the vessels Noordsvaarder and Texel salvaged 200 bales of cotton.

=== Wreck locating ===
In October 1926 several buoys were placed at the wreck site, partly to warn other ships. In 2010 divers from Terschelling made several attempts to find the ship, but were unable to find the wreck.
