= USS Newburgh =

Cargo ship of the United States Navy

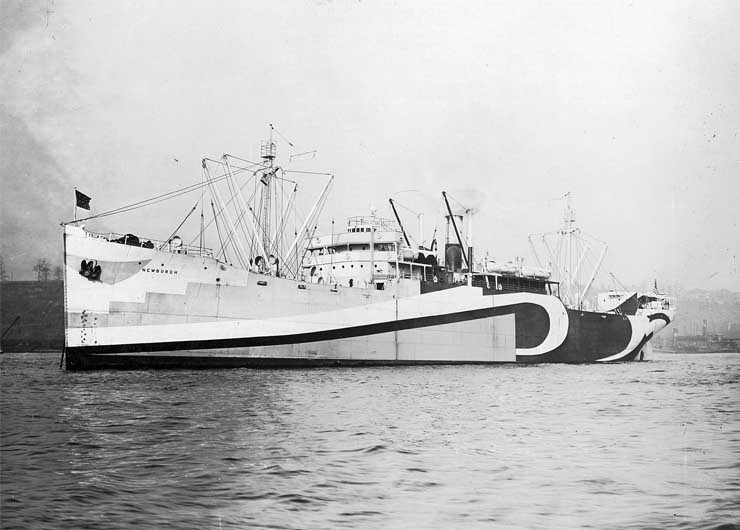
- Newburgh, probably photographed near New York City on the day of her trials (30 December 1918) or the day of her commissioning (31 December 1918).

History

United States
- Name: USS Newburgh
- Namesake: Newburgh, New York
- Builder: Newburgh Shipyards, Newburgh, New York
- Launched: 2 September 1918
- Completed: December 1918
- Acquired: December 1918
- Commissioned: 31 December 1918
- Decommissioned: 19 June 1919
- Fate: Transferred to United States Shipping Board 19 June 1919
- Notes: Under United States Shipping Board Control 1919-1931; Sold for scrapping 1931

General characteristics
- Type: Cargo ship
- Tonnage: 5,983 Gross register tons
- Displacement: 12,330 tons
- Length: 418 ft (127 m)
- Beam: 54 ft (16 m)
- Draft: 25 ft (7.6 m)
- Propulsion: Steam engine, one shaft
- Speed: 11 knots
- Complement: 118

USS Newburgh (ID-1369), also reported as ID-3768, was a United States Navy cargo ship in commission in 1919.

SS Newburgh was laid down for the United States Shipping Board as a cargo ship on 2 September 1918 at Newburgh, New York, by Newburgh Shipyards. She was completed in December 1918 and underwent her sea trials on 30 December 1918. Transferred to the U.S. Navy, she was assigned a naval registry Identification Number (Id. No.) -- either 1369 or 3768, according to various sources—and commissioned at Hoboken, New Jersey, on 31 December 1918 commanded by John Daniel McLeod.

Assigned to the Naval Overseas Transportation Service, Newburgh departed New York City on 25 January 1919 with a cargo of flour, bacon, and lard consigned to the Northern Food Administration. She called briefly at Falmouth, England, on 15 February 1919, where she received orders to steam to Rotterdam, the Netherlands, to offload her cargo.

After bunkering and ballasting at Plymouth, England, Newburgh departed for New York City in ballast on 3 March 1919. In mid-March 1919, during the crossing, she lost two blades from her propeller and was forced to put in at the Azores to await the shipment of a new propeller from New York City.

Following repairs, she returned in early April 1919 to New York City, where she loaded a United States Army cargo of hay and oats. She delivered that cargo to Rotterdam in mid-May 1919, then returned to the United States. On the return voyage she again suffered propeller damage, and this time had to put into Bermuda for repairs and refueling, after which she returned to New York City in June 1919.

Newburgh was decommissioned at New York City on 19 June 1919. She was transferred to the United States Shipping Board the same day, and remained in the Shipping Board's custody as SS Newburgh until sold for scrapping at Baltimore, Maryland, in 1931.
