= USS Auburn (ID-3842) =

Cargo ship of the United States Navy

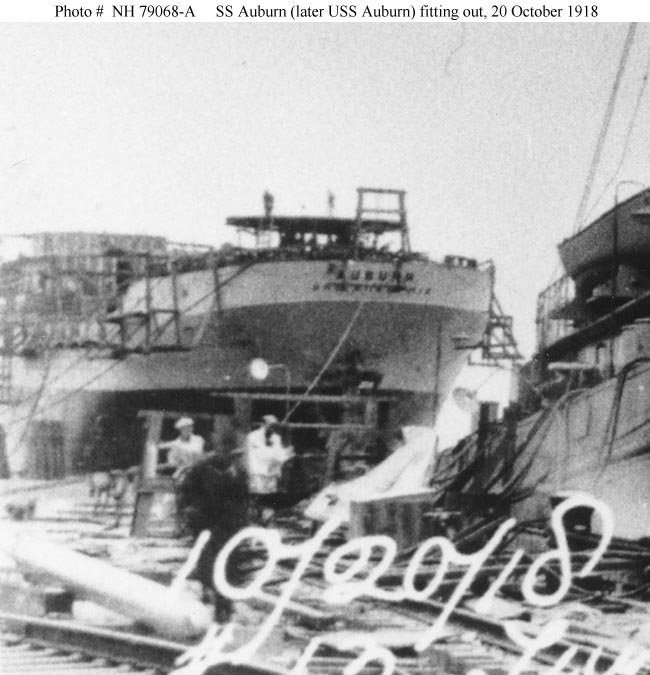
- Fitting out Auburn in Chester, Pennsylvania, 20 October 1918.

History

United States
- Name: Auburn
- Owner: United States Shipping Board
- Operator: 1919: United States Navy
- Port of registry: Philadelphia
- Builder: Chester Shipbuilding Company
- Launched: 25 September 1918
- Commissioned: 24 January 1919
- Decommissioned: 22 February 1919
- Identification: US official number 217438; code letters LPKN
- Fate: Scrapped 1934

General characteristics
- Tonnage: 6,025 GRT, 3,361 NRT
- Displacement: 12,314 tons
- Length: 400.7 ft (122.1 m) registered
- Beam: 54.2 ft (16.5 m)
- Draft: 32 ft 9 in (10.0 m)
- Depth: 30.1 ft (9.2 m)
- Decks: 2
- Propulsion: 1 × screw; 2 × steam turbines
- Speed: 10 knots (19 km/h)
- Complement: 81 officers and enlisted

The first USS Auburn (ID-3842) was a steam turbine cargo ship of the United States Shipping Board that was built in 1919 and scrapped in 1934. In 1919 she briefly served in the United States Navy.

== Building ==
The Chester Shipbuilding Company at Chester, Pennsylvania built Auburn for the United States Shipping Board (USSB). She was launched in 1918 and completed in 1919.

Auburn's registered length was 400.7 ft (122.1 m), her beam was 54.2 ft (16.5 m) and her depth was 30.1 ft (9.2 m). Her tonnages were 6,025 GRT and 3,361 NRT. She had a single screw, driven by a pair of Westinghouse steam turbines via double reduction gearing. The USSB registered her at Philadelphia. Her US official number was 217438 and her code letters were LPKN.

== Career ==
The USSB delivered Auburn to the US Navy for service in the Naval Overseas Transportation Service (NOTS). Assigned the identification number 3842, Auburn was commissioned at Philadelphia on the afternoon of 24 January 1919.

Two days later, the cargo ship got underway for New York harbor, proceeded down Delaware Bay, and dropped anchor off Tompkinsville, Staten Island, on the morning of 27 January. After initially shifting to Bush Terminal pier, South Brooklyn, on the 29th, she moored at pier 61, North River, New York City, on 2 February. There, she loaded 5,236 tons of general cargo (including a large quantity of wheat flour) and prepared for her maiden voyage. However, her engineers discovered several split condenser tubes in her boilers before the trip could begin, and an inspection board convened and visited the ship on 15 February.

After a brief period of repairs, Auburn moved to pier 16, South Brooklyn, on the 17th. By that time, the Navy had apparently decided to demobilize her, and, on the afternoon of 22 February 1919, representatives of the USSB accepted custody of the ship when she was decommissioned.

Auburn's subsequent career, like hers under the aegis of NOTS, was brief. She remained in the USSB fleet into the early 1930s, very probably laid up due to postwar austerity measures in the American merchant marine."

Auburn was recorded as "broken up" in 1934.

== Bibliography ==
- "Steamers & Motorships". Lloyd's Register of Shipping. London: Lloyd's Register of Shipping. 1928. ATR–AUD – via Internet Archive.
- "Steamers & Motorships". Lloyd's Register of Shipping. London: Lloyd's Register of Shipping. 1934. ATT–AUG – via Internet Archive.
