= Design 1025 ship =

World War I steel-hulled cargo ship design

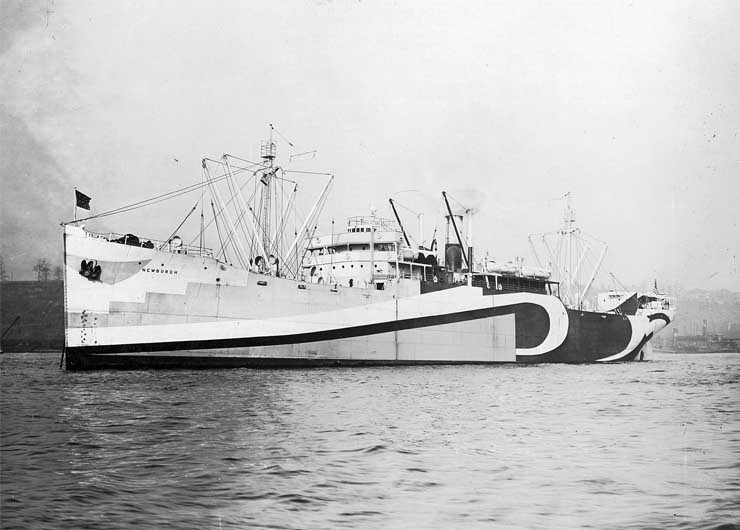
- USS Newburgh (1918)

Class overview
- Name: EFT Design 1025
- Builders: Merchant Shipbuilding Corporation; Newburgh Shipyards; Pensacola Shipbuilding Company
- Built: 1919–1920 (USSB)
- Planned: 62
- Completed: 62

General characteristics
- Type: Cargo ship
- Tonnage: 9,000 dwt
- Length: 410 ft 5 in (125.10 m)
- Beam: 54 ft 0 in (16.46 m)
- Draft: 29 ft 9 in (9.07 m)
- Propulsion: Two turbines, oil fuel

The Design 1025 ship (full name Emergency Fleet Corporation Design 1025) was a steel-hulled cargo ship design approved for production by the United States Shipping Board's Emergency Fleet Corporation (EFC) in World War I. They were referred to as the "Harriman-type" as the majority of ships were built in the Harriman section of Bristol, Pennsylvania. A total of 62 ships were ordered and built at three shipyards: 40 ships at Merchant Shipbuilding Corporation, Bristol, Pennsylvania; 12 ships at Newburgh Shipyards in Newburgh, New York; and 10 ships at Pensacola Shipbuilding Company in Pensacola, Florida.

== Bibliography ==
- McKellar, Norman L. "Steel Shipbuilding under the U. S. Shipping Board, 1917-1921, Part III, Contract Steel Ships" (PDF). Steel Shipbuilding under the U. S. Shipping Board, 1917-1921. ShipScribe.
