= List of ship launches in 1919 =

The list of ship launches in 1919 includes a chronological list of ships launched in 1919. In cases where no official launching ceremony was held, the date built or completed may be used instead.

== January ==
Date	Ship	Class	Builder	Location	Country	Notes
Bath Iron Works	Bath, Maine	2 January	United States			
Buchanan	Wickes-class destroyer	For United States Navy.				
2 January	United States	G. M. Standifer Construction	Vancouver, Washington	Cokesit	Design 1015 ship	For United States Shipping Board.
2 January	United States	Columbia River Shipbuilding	Portland, Oregon	West Corum	Design 1013 ship	For United States Shipping Board.
4 January	United States	Sun Shipbuilding Company	Chester, Pennsylvania	Eddelyn	Troop ship	Requisitioned by the United States Shipping Board.
4 January	United States	Todd Dry Dock and Construction Company	Tacoma, Washington	Quittacas	Design 1014 ship	For United States Shipping Board.
8 January	United States	Union Iron Works	San Francisco, California	Stoddert	Clemson-class destroyer	For United States Navy.
9 January	United States	American Shipbuilding Company	Wyandotte, Michigan	Lake Greenbier	Design 1093 ship	For United States Shipping Board.
10 January	United States	Great Lakes Engineering Works	Ecorse, Michigan	Coulee	Design 1060 ship	For United States Shipping Board.
11 January	United States	William Cramp & Sons	Philadelphia, Pennsylvania	Cole	Wickes-class destroyer	For United States Navy.
11 January	United States	Skinner & Eddy	Seattle, Washington	Edgemont	Design 1079 ship	For United States Shipping Board.
12 January	United States	American Shipbuilding Company	Cleveland, Ohio	Lake Forney	Design 1093 ship	For United States Shipping Board.
14 January	United States	Fore River Shipyard	Quincy, Massachusetts	Belknap	Clemson-class destroyer	For United States Navy.
14 January	United States	Mare Island Navy Yard	Vallejo, California	Claxton	Wickes-class destroyer	For United States Navy.
14 January	United States	Northwest Steel	Portland, Oregon	West Tacook	Design 1013 ship	For United States Shipping Board.
15 January	United States	Mare Island Navy Yard	Vallejo, California	Hamilton	Wickes-class destroyer	For United States Navy.
15 January	United States	Whitney Bros. Company	Superior, Wisconsin	Huckey	Design 1035 tug	For United States Shipping Board.
15 January	United States	Long Beach Shipbuilding Company	Long Beach, California	Wallingford	Design 1097 ship	For United States Shipping Board.
16 January	United States	American Shipbuilding Company	Wyandotte, Michigan	Lake Gretna	Design 1093 ship	For United States Shipping Board.
16 January	United States	Chester Shipbuilding Corporation	Chester, Pennsylvania	Mystic	Cargo ship	Requisitioned by the United States Shipping Board.
18 January	United States	Hanlon Dry Dock and Shipbuilding	Oakland, California	Delfina	Design 1043 ship	For United States Shipping Board.
18 January	United States	Union Iron Works	San Francisco, California	Farquhar	Clemson-class destroyer	For United States Navy.
18 January	United States	Bethlehem Sparrows Point	Sparrows Point, Maryland	Hoven	Design 1047 ship	For United States Shipping Board.
18 January	United States	Atlantic Corporation	Portsmouth, New Hampshire	Kisnop	Design 1019 ship	For United States Shipping Board.
18 January	United States	American Shipbuilding Company	Lorain, Ohio	Lake Freeland	Design 1093 ship	For United States Shipping Board.
18 January	United States	Fore River Shipyard	Quincy, Massachusetts	R-3	R-ckass submarine	For United States Navy.
18 January	United States	American International Shipbuilding	Hog Island, Pennsylvania	Saugertis	Design 1022 ship	For United States Shipping Board.
18 January	United States	American International Shipbuilding	Hog Island, Pennsylvania	Schodack	Design 1022 ship	For United States Shipping Board.
19 January	United States	Union Iron Works	San Francisco, California	Thompson	Clemson-class destroyer	For United States Navy.
20 January	United States	Great Lakes Engineering Works	Ecorse, Michigan	Cottonplant	Design 1060 ship	For United States Shipping Board.
20 January	United States	American Shipbuilding Company	Wyandotte, Michigan	Lake Grogan	Design 1093 ship	For United States Shipping Board.
21 January	United States	Standard Shipbuilding Corporation	Shooters Island, New York	Shooters Island	Cargo ship	Requisitioned by the United States Shipping Board.
22 January	United States	Manitowoc Shipbuilding Company	Manitowoc, Wisconsin	Cornucopia	Design 1044 ship	For United States Shipping Board.
22 January	United States	Union Iron Works	San Francisco, California	Reno	Clemson-class destroyer	For United States Navy.
23 January	United States	American Shipbuilding Company	Chicago, Illinois	Lake Grainger	Design 1093 ship	For United States Shipping Board.
25 January	United States	Submarine Boat Corporation	Newark, New Jersey	Farnam	Design 1023 ship	For United States Shipping Board.
25 January	United States	Toledo Shipbuilding Company	Toledo, Ohio	Lake Charlottesville	Design 1020 ship	For United States Shipping Board.
28 January	United States	Northwest Steel	Portland, Oregon	West Togus	Design 1013 ship	For United States Shipping Board.
29 January	United States	Globe Shipbuilding Company	Superior, Wisconsin	Copalgrove	Design 1020 ship	For United States Shipping Board.
29 January	United States	Alameda Works Shipyard	Alameda, California	Hegira	Design 1032 ship	For United States Shipping Board.
29 January	United States	Baltimore Dry Dock and Shipbuilding Company	Baltimore, Maryland	Pigeon	Lapwing-class minesweeper	For United States Navy.
29 January	United States	Los Angeles Shipbuilding and Dry Dock Company	San Pedro, California	West Selene	Design 1013 ship	For United States Shipping Board.
30 January	United States	American Shipbuilding Company	Wyandotte, Michigan	Lake Flovilla	Design 1093 ship	For United States Shipping Board.
30 January	United States	Staten Island Shipbuilding Company	Mariners Harbor, New York	Ortolan	Lapwing-class minesweeper	For United States Navy.
30 January	United States	Moore Shipbuilding Company	Oakland, California	Tuckanuck	Design 1015 ship	For United States Shipping Board.
31 January	United States	Bethlehem Elizabethport	Elizabeth, New Jersey	Ballenas	Design 1035 tug	For United States Shipping Board.
31 January	United States	Bethlehem Elizabethport	Elizabeth, New Jersey	Ballew	Design 1035 tug	For United States Shipping Board.
31 January	United States	Albina Engine & Machine Works	Portland, Oregon	Glendola	Design 1049 ship	For United States Shipping Board.
31 January	United States	American Shipbuilding Company	Lorain, Ohio	Lake Freed	Design 1093 ship	For United States Shipping Board.
31 January	United States	Fore River Shipyard	Quincy, Massachusetts	McCook	Clemson-class destroyer	For United States Navy.

== February ==
Date	Ship	Class	Builder	Location	Country	Notes	Great Lakes Engineering Works	Ecorse, Michigan	1 February	United States
Cortois	Design 1060 ship	For United States Shipping Board.								
1 February	United States	Great Lakes Engineering Works	Ashtabula, Ohio	Cowee	Design 1060 ship	For United States Shipping Board.				
1 February	United States	Baltimore Dry Dock and Shipbuilding Company	Baltimore, Maryland	Oscoda	Design 1016 ship	For United States Shipping Board.				
1 February	United States	Newburgh Shipyards	Newburgh, New York	Walden	Design 1025 ship	For United States Shipping Board.				
1 February	United States	Southwestern Shipbuilding Company	San Pedro, California	West Catanace	Design 1019 ship	For United States Shipping Board.				
1 February	United States	Columbia River Shipbuilding	Portland, Oregon	West Harcuvar	Design 1013 ship	For United States Shipping Board.				
1 February	United States	Merchant Shipbuilding Corporation	Harriman, Pennsylvania	Wynooche	Design 1025 ship	For United States Shipping Board.				
2 February	United States	Federal Shipbuilding	Kearny, New Jersey	Duquesne	Design 1037 ship	For United States Shipping Board.				
2 February	Canada	Polson Iron Works	Toronto	Oise	Cargo vessel	For Shipping Controller				
5 February	United States	Squantum Victory Yard	Quincy, Massachusetts	Bailey	Clemson-class destroyer	For United States Navy				
5 February	United States	Todd Brooklyn	Brooklyn, New York	Cormorant	Lapwing-class minesweeper	For United States Navy.				
5 February	United States	Whitney Bros. Company	Superior, Wisconsin	Hulver	Design 1035 tug	For United States Shipping Board.				
6 February	United States	American Shipbuilding Company	Wyandotte, Michigan	Lake Flume	Design 1093 ship	For United States Shipping Board.				
6 February	United States	Union Iron Works	San Francisco, California	Woodbury	Clemson-class destroyer	For United States Navy.				
8 February	United States	Submarine Boat Corporation	Newark, New Jersey	Jekyl	Design 1023 ship	For United States Shipping Board.				
8 February	United States	American Shipbuilding Company	Superior, Wisconsin	Lake Fraichur	Design 1093 ship	For United States Shipping Board.				
8 February	United States	American Shipbuilding Company	Lorain, Ohio	Lake Freezeout	Design 1093 ship	For United States Shipping Board.				
8 February	United States	Submarine Boat Corporation	Newark, New Jersey	Nesco	Design 1023 ship	For United States Shipping Board.				
8 February	United States	Downey Shipbuilding Corporation	Staten Island, New York	Sabotawan	Design 1017 ship	For United States Shipping Board.				
11 February	United States	Great Lakes Engineering Works	Ecorse, Michigan	Couparle	Design 1060 ship	For United States Shipping Board.				
11 February	United States	Columbia River Shipbuilding	Portland, Oregon	West Imboden	Design 1013 ship	For United States Shipping Board.				
12 February	United States	Manitowoc Shipbuilding Company	Manitowoc, Wisconsin	Corcoran	Design 1044 ship	For United States Shipping Board.				
12 February	United States	American Shipbuilding Company	Wyandotte, Michigan	Lake Flushing	Design 1093 ship	For United States Shipping Board.				
12 February	United States	Northwest Steel	Portland, Oregon	West Nohno	Design 1013 ship	For United States Shipping Board.				
14 February	United States	Sun Shipbuilding Company	Chester, Pennsylvania	Sol Navis	Troopship	Requisitioned by the United States Shipping Board.				
15 February	United States	Providence Engineering Works	Providence, Rhode Island	Bathalum	Design 1035 tug	For United States Shipping Board.				
15 February	United States	Alabama Dry Dock and Shipbuilding Company	Mobile, Alabama	Bittern	Lapwing-class minesweeper	For United States Navy.				
15 February	United States	Pusey & Jones	Gloucester City, New Jersey	Castle Town	Cargo ship	Requisitioned by the United States Shipping Board.				
15 February	United States	Bethlehem Sparrows Point	Sparrows Point, Maryland	Hoxbar	Design 1047 ship	For United States Shipping Board.				
15 February	United States	Union Iron Works	San Francisco, California	Kennedy	Clemson-class destroyer	For United States Navy.				
15 February	United States	Puget Sound Navy Yard	Bremerton, Washington	Kingfisher	Lapwing-class minesweeper	For United States Navy.				
15 February	United States	Toledo Shipbuilding Company	Toledo, Ohio	Lake Calvenia	Design 1020 ship	For United States Shipping Board.				
15 February	United States	American Shipbuilding Company	Wyandotte, Michigan	Lake Flymus	Design 1093 ship	For United States Shipping Board.				
15 February	United States	American Shipbuilding Company	Cleveland, Ohio	Lake Forsby	Design 1093 ship	For United States Shipping Board.				
15 February	United States	American Shipbuilding Company	Chicago, Illinois	Lake Granca	Design 1093 ship	For United States Shipping Board.				
15 February	United States	Pusey & Jones	Wilmington, Delaware	Rock Island	Cargo ship	Requisitioned by the United States Shipping Board.				
15 February	United States	Lake Torpedo Boat	Bridgeport, Connecticut	S-2	S-class submarine	For United States Navy.				
16 February	United States	Submarine Boat Corporation	Newark, New Jersey	Masca	Design 1023 ship	For United States Shipping Board.				
16 February	United States	Submarine Boat Corporation	Newark, New Jersey	National Bridge	Design 1023 ship	For United States Shipping Board.				
16 February	United States	Submarine Boat Corporation	Newark, New Jersey	Passaic Bridge	Design 1023 ship	For United States Shipping Board.				
16 February	United States	Los Angeles Shipbuilding and Dry Dock Company	San Pedro, California	West Mingo	Design 1013 ship	For United States Shipping Board.				
17 February	United States	Ferguson Steel & Iron	Buffalo, New York	Chimo	Bagaduce-class tug	For United States Navy.				
18 February	United Kingdom	William Hamilton & Co. Ltd.	Port Glasgow	Clan Matheson	Cargo ship	For Clan Line Ltd.				
18 February	United States	Chester Shipbuilding Corporation	Chester, Pennsylvania	Silverbrook	Tanker	Requisitioned by the United States Shipping Board.				
20 February	United States	Merill-Stevens Shipbuilding Corporation	Jacksonville, Florida	Ashbee	Design 1012 ship	For United States Shipping Board.				
20 February	United States	American Shipbuilding Company	Lorain, Ohio	Lake Fresco	Design 1093 ship	For United States Shipping Board.				
21 February	United States	Great Lakes Engineering Works	Ecorse, Michigan	Coushatta	Design 1060 ship	For United States Shipping Board.				
21 February	United States	Union Iron Works	San Francisco, California	Paul Hamilton	Clemson-class destroyer	For United States Navy.				
21 February	United States	American International Shipbuilding	Hog Island, Pennsylvania	Saugus	Design 1022 ship	For United States Shipping Board.				
21 February	United States	Puget Sound Navy Yard	Bremerton, Washington	Tatnuck	Bagaduce-class tug	For United States Navy.				
22 February	United States	Oscar Daniels Company	Tampa, Florida	Yomachichi	Design 1027 ship	For United States Shipping Board.				
26 February	United States	Albina Engine & Machine Works	Portland, Oregon	Glendoyle	Design 1049 ship	For United States Shipping Board.				
26 February	United States	Western Pipe & Steel	South San Francisco, California	West Alcoz	Design 1019 ship	For United States Shipping Board.				
27 February	United States	G. M. Standifer Construction	Vancouver, Washington	Coaxet	Design 1015 ship	For United States Shipping Board.				
27 February	United States	New York Shipbuilding	Camden, New Jersey	Gulf Queen	Tanker	Requisitioned by the United States Shipping Board.				
27 February	United States	Virginia Shipbuilding Corporation	Alexandria, Virginia	Gunston Hall	Design 1015 ship	For United States Shipping Board.				
27 February	United States	Whitney Bros. Company	Superior, Wisconsin	Humaconna	Design 1035 tug	For United States Shipping Board.				
27 February	United States	American Shipbuilding Company	Wyandotte, Michigan	Lake Folcroft	Design 1093 ship	For United States Shipping Board.				
27 February	United States	American Shipbuilding Company	Wyandotte, Michigan	Lake Sapor	Design 1093 ship	For United States Shipping Board.				
28 February	United States	Fore River Shipyard	Quincy, Massachusetts	Ingram	Clemson-class destroyer	For United States Navy.				
28 February	United States	Puget Sound Navy Yard	Bremerton, Washington	Mahopac	Bagaduce-class tug	For United States Navy.				
28 February	United States	Union Iron Works	San Francisco, California	O'Bannon	Wickes-class destroyer	For United States Navy.				
28 February	United States	American International Shipbuilding	Hog Island, Pennsylvania	Sangamon	Design 1022 ship	For United States Shipping Board.				
28 February	United States	Puget Sound Navy Yard	Bremerton, Washington	Sunnadin	Bagaduce-class tug	For United States Navy.				
28 February	United States	Northwest Steel	Portland, Oregon	West Cherow	Design 1013 ship	For United States Shipping Board .				
28 February	United States	Columbia River Shipbuilding	Portland, Oregon	West Hardaway	Design 1013 ship	For United States Shipping Board.				

== March ==
Date	Ship	Class	Builder	Location	Country	Notes	American Shipbuilding Company	Lorain, Ohio	1 March	United States
Lake Frenchton	Design 1093 ship	For United States Shipping Board.								
1 March	United States	American Shipbuilding Company	Chicago, Illinois	Lake Grampian	Design 1093 ship	For United States Shipping Board.				
1 March	United States	Saginaw Shipbuilding Company	Saginaw, Michigan	Lake Saba	Design 1020 ship	For United States Shipping Board.				
1 March	United States	Fore River Shipyard	Quincy, Massachusetts	R-6	R-class submarine	For United States Navy.				
1 March	United States	Southwestern Shipbuilding Company	San Pedro, California	West Sequana	Design 1019 ship	For United States Shipping Board .				
2 March	United States	Submarine Boat Corporation	Newark, New Jersey	Milwaukee Bridge	Design 1023 ship	For United States Shipping Board.				
2 March	United States	Submarine Boat Corporation	Newark, New Jersey	Wisconsin Bridge	Design 1023 ship	For United States Shipping Board.				
4 March	United States	Northwest Engineering Works	Green Bay, Wisconsin	Menominee	Design 1035 tug	For United States Shipping Board.				
5 March	United States	Bethlehem Elizabethport	Elizabeth, New Jersey	Barkhamstead	Design 1035 tug	For United States Shipping Board,				
5 March	United States	Bethlehem Elizabethport	Elizabeth, New Jersey	Barlow	Design 1035 tug	For United States Shipping Board,				
5 March	United States	McDougall-Duluth Shipbuilding Company	Duluth, Minnesota	Chappell	Design 1020 ship	For United States Shipping Board.				
5 March	United Kingdom	Harland & Wolff	Belfast	War Paris	G-type cargo ship	For British Shipping Controller.				
8 March	United States	Great Lakes Engineering Works	Ashtabula, Ohio	Cowiche	Design 1060 ship	For United States Shipping Board.				
8 March	United States	Baltimore Dry Dock and Shipbuilding Company	Baltimore, Maryland	Galahad	Design 1016 ship	For United States Shipping Board.				
8 March	United States	American Shipbuilding Company	Cleveland, Ohio	Lake Fossil	Design 1093 ship	For United States Shipping Board.				
8 March	United States	Newport News Shipbuilding	Newport News, Virginia	Mason	Clemson-class destroyer					
8 March	United States	American International Shipbuilding	Hog Island, Pennsylvania	Schoharie	Design 1022 ship	For United States Shipping Board.				
8 March	United States	Merchant Shipbuilding Corporation	Harriman, Pennsylvania	Wauconda	Design 1025 ship	For United States Shipping Board.				
9 March	United States	Standard Shipbuilding Corporation	Shooters Island, New York	Balsam	Design 1063 ship	For United States Shipping Board.				
9 March	United States	Downey Shipbuilding Corporation	Staten Island, New York	Dochet	Design 1017 ship	For United States Shipping Board.				
9 March	United States	Federal Shipbuilding	Kearny, New Jersey	McKeesport	Design 1037 ship	For United States Shipping Board.				
10 March	United States	Great Lakes Engineering Works	Ecorse, Michigan	Covalt	Design 1060 ship	For United States Shipping Board.				
11 March	United States	Hanlon Dry Dock and Shipbuilding	Oakland, California	Delisle	Design 1043 ship	For United States Shipping Board.				
11 March	United States	Alameda Works Shipyard	Alameda, California	Derbyline	Design 1047 ship	For United States Shipping Board.				
12 March	United States	Newark, New Jersey	Submarine Boat Corporation	Bound Brook	Design 1023 ship	For United States Shipping Board.				
12 March	United States	New York Shipbuilding	Camden, New Jersey	Dickerson	Wickes-class destroyer	For United States Navy.				
12 March	United States	Newark, New Jersey	Submarine Boat Corporation	Opequan	Design 1023 ship	For United States Shipping Board.				
13 March	United States	McDougall-Duluth Shipbuilding Company	Duluth, Minnesota	Chamblee	Design 1020 ship	For United States Shipping Board.				
13 March	United States	American Shipbuilding Company	Wyandotte, Michigan	Lake Fonda	Design 1093 ship	For United States Shipping Board.				
15 March	United States	Pensacola Shipbuilding Company	Pensacola, Florida	Cushnoc	Design 1025 ship	For United States Shipping Board.				
15 March	United States	American Shipbuilding Company	Superior, Wisconsin	Lake Fraley	Design 1093 ship	For United States Shipping Board.				
15 March	United States	American Shipbuilding Company	Chicago, Illinois	Lake Grampus	Design 1093 ship	For United States Shipping Board.				
15 March	United States	American International Shipbuilding	Hog Island, Pennsylvania	Schenectady	Design 1022 ship	For United States Shipping Board.				
15 March	United States	Western Pipe & Steel	South San Francisco, California	West Aleta	Design 1019 ship	For United States Shipping Board.				
15 March	United States	Long Beach Shipbuilding Company	Long Beach, California	West Kasson	Design 1019 ship	For United States Shipping Board.				
15 March	United States	Columbia River Shipbuilding	Portland, Oregon	West Munham	Design 1013 ship	For United States Shipping Board.				
17 March	United States	New York Shipbuilding	Camden, New Jersey	Hatfield	Clemson-class destroyer	For United States Navy.				
17 March	United States	American Shipbuilding Company	Lorain, Ohio	Lake Inaha	Design 1093 ship	For United States Shipping Board.				
17 March	United States	Northwest Steel	Portland, Oregon	West Celeron	Design 1013 ship	For United States Shipping Board.				
18 March	United States	Staten Island Shipbuilding Company	Mariners Harbor, New York	York Harbor	Cargo ship	Requisitioned by the United States Shipping Board.				
19 March	United States	William Cramp & Sons	Philadelphia, Pennsylvania	Chandler	Clemson-class destroyer	For United States Navy.				
19 March	United States	Todd Brooklyn	Brooklyn, New York	Gannet	Lapwing-class minesweeper	For United States Navy				
19 March	United States	American Shipbuilding Company	Wyandotte, Michigan	Lake Fontanet	Design 1093 ship	For United States Shipping Board.				
20 March	United States	Albina Engine & Machine Works	Portland, Oregon	Glorieta	Design 1049 ship	For United States Shipping Board.				
20 March	United States	Southwestern Shipbuilding Company	San Pedro, California	West Cavanal	Design 1019 ship	For United States Shipping Board.				
21 March	United States	Fore River Shipyard	Quincy, Massachusetts	Bancroft	Clemson-class destroyer	For United States Navy.				
21 March	United States	Great Lakes Engineering Works	Ecorse, Michigan	Coutolene	Design 1060 ship	For United States Shipping Board.				
22 March	United States	Skinner & Eddy	Seattle, Washington	Eldena	Design 1079 ship	For United States Shipping Board.				
22 March	United States	Newport News Shipbuilding	Newport News, Virginia	Graham	Clemson-class destroyer	For United States Navy.				
22 March	United States	American International Shipbuilding	Hog Island, Pennsylvania	Sarcoxie	Design 1022 ship	For United States Shipping Board.				
22 March	United States	Squantum Victory Yard	Quincy, Massachusetts	Thornton	Clemson-class destroyer	For United States Navy.				
22 March	United States	Gas Engine and Power Company	New York	Tern	Lapwing-class minesweeper	For United States Navy.				
25 March	United States	Lorain, Ohio	American Shipbuilding Company	Lake Friar	Design 1093 ship	For United States Shipping Board.				
27 March	United States	Submarine Boat Corporation	Newark, New Jersey	Knoxville	Design 1023 ship	For United States Shipping Board.				
27 March	United States	Wyandotte, Michigan	American Shipbuilding Company	Lake Fontana	Design 1093 ship	For United States Shipping Board.				
27 March	United States	Submarine Boat Corporation	Newark, New Jersey	Louisville Bridge	Design 1023 ship	For United States Shipping Board.				
27 March	United States	Downey Shipbuilding Corporation	Staten Island, New York	Strathnaver	Design 1017 ship	For United States Shipping Board.				
28 March	United States	Great Lakes Engineering Works	Ecorse, Michigan	Covena	Design 1060 ship	For United States Shipping Board.				
28 March	United States	Fore River Shipyard	Quincy, Massachusetts	McCalla	Clemson-class destroyer	For United States Navy.				
28 March	United States	Northwest Steel	Portland, Oregon	West Celine	Design 1013 ship	For United States Shipping Board.				
29 March	United States	Skinner & Eddy	Seattle, Washington	Edgemoore	Design 1079 ship	For United States Shipping Board.				
29 March	United States	Texas Steamship Corporation	Bath, Maine	Shenandoah	Tanker	Requisitioned by the United States Shipping Board.				
29 March	United States	J. F. Duthie & Company	Seattle, Washington	West Hembrie	Design 1013 ship	For United States Shipping Board.				
29 March	United States	Ames Shipbuilding and Dry Dock Company	Seattle, Washington	West Irmo	Design 1080 ship	For United States Shipping Board.				
30 March	United States	Submarine Boat Corporation	Newark, New Jersey	Anniston	Design 1023 ship	For United States Shipping Board.				
30 March	United States	Bethlehem Elizabethport	Elizabeth, New Jersey	Barrallton	Design 1035 tug	For United States Shipping Board.				
30 March	United States	Bethlehem Elizabethport	Elizabeth, New Jersey	Barranca	Design 1035 tug	For United States Shipping Board.				
30 March	United States	Submarine Boat Corporation	Newark, New Jersey	Chattanooga	Design 1023 ship	For United States Shipping Board.				
30 March	United States	Moore Shipbuilding Company	Oakland, California	Cotati	Design 1015 ship	For United States Shipping Board.				
30 March	United States	Pacific Coast Shipbuilding Company	Bay Point, California	Cansumset	Design 1015 ship	For United States Shipping Board.				
30 March	United States	Moore Shipbuilding Company	Oakland, California	Imlay	Design 1041 ship	For United States Shipping Board.				
30 March	United States	Los Angeles Shipbuilding and Dry Dock Company	San Pedro, California	West Montop	Design 1013 ship	For United States Shipping Board.				
31 March	United States	Federal Shipbuilding	Kearny, New Jersey	Donora	Design 1037 ship	For United States Shipping Board.				
31 March	United States	Submarine Boat Corporation	Newark, New Jersey	Montgomery	Design 1023 ship	For United States Shipping Board.				
31 March	Japan	Kure Naval Arsenal	Kure	Ro-14	Kaichu II-type submarine	For Imperial Japanese Navy				
31 March	United States	William Cramp & Sons	Philadelphia, Pennsylvania	Southard	Clemson-class destroyer	For United States Navy				
31 March	United States	American International Shipbuilding	Hog Island, Pennsylvania	Schoodic	Design 1022 ship	For United States Shipping Board.				
31 March	United States	Merchant Shipbuilding Corporation	Harriman, Pennsylvania	Waukau	Design 1025 ship	For United States Shipping Board.				
31 March	United States	Federal Shipbuilding	Kearny, New Jersey	Waukigon	Design 1037 ship	For United States Shipping Board.				

== April ==
Date	Ship	Class	Builder	Location	Country	Notes	Merchant Shipbuilding Corporation	Harriman, Pennsylvania	1 April	United States
Intan	Design 1025 shi	For United States Shipping Board.								
2 April	United States	American Shipbuilding Company	Wyandotte, Michigan	Lake Faresman	Design 1093 ship	For United States Shipping Board.				
3 April	United States	Saginaw Shipbuilding Company	Saginaw, Michigan	Lake Canaveral	Design 1020 ship	For United States Shipping Board.				
3 April	United Kingdom	Blyth Shipbuilding & Dry Docks Co. Ltd	Blyth	Dunmail	Cargo ship	For Sharp Steamship Co. Ltd.				
3 April	United Kingdom	Harland & Wolff	Belfast	War Vision	N-type cargo ship	For British Shipping Controller.				
3 April	United States	Columbia River Shipbuilding	Portland, Oregon	West Totant	Design 1013 ship	For United States Shipping Board.				
4 April	United States	Northwest Engineering Works	Green Bay, Wisconsin	Toopi	Design 1035 tug	For United States Shipping Board.				
5 April	United States	Ferguson Steel & Iron	Buffalo, New York	Bagaduce	Bagaduce-class tug	For United States Navy.				
5 April	United States	Providence Engineering Works	Providence, Rhode Island	Bathgate	Design 1035 tug	For United States Shipping Board.				
5 April	United States	McDougall-Duluth Shipbuilding Company	Duluth, Minnesota	Chautauqua	Design 1020 ship	For United States Shipping Board.				
5 April	United States	Standard Shipbuilding Corporation	Shooters Island, New York	Eastside	Design 1063 ship	For United States Shipping Board.				
5 April	United States	American Shipbuilding Company	Cleveland, Ohio	Lake Fannin	Design 1099 ship	For United States Shipping Board.				
5 April	United States	Toledo Shipbuilding Company	Toledo, Ohio	Lake Festina	Design 1099 ship	For United States Shipping Board.				
5 April	United States	American Shipbuilding Company	Chicago, Illinois	Lake Granby	Design 1093 ship	For United States Shipping Board.				
5 April	United States	Seattle North Pacific Shipbuilding Company	Seattle, Washington	Osaqumsick	Design 1015 ship	For United States Shipping Board.				
5 April	United States	Bethlehem Wilmington	Wilmington, Delaware	Romulus	Design 1031 ship	For United States Shipping Board.				
5 April	United States	Fore River Shipyard	Quincy, Massachusetts	R-7	R-class submarine	For United States Navy.				
5 April	United States	American International Shipbuilding	Hog Island, Pennsylvania	Seekonk	Design 1022 ship	For United States Shipping Board.				
5 April	United States	Groton Iron Works	Groton, Connecticut	Worcester	Design 1016 ship	For United States Shipping Board.				
8 April	United States	Staten Island Shipbuilding Company	Mariners Harbor, New York	Peacock	Lapwing-class minesweeper	For United States Navy.				
8 April	United States	Skinner & Eddy	Seattle, Washington	Wheatland Montana	Design 1079 ship	For United States Shipping Board.				
9 April	United States	Great Lakes Engineering Works	Ecorse, Michigan	Cowan	Design 1060 ship	For United States Shipping Board.				
9 April	United States	American Shipbuilding Company	Superior, Wisconsin	Lake Farlin	Design 1099 ship	For United States Shipping Board.				
9 April	United States	Submarine Boat Corporation	Newark, New Jersey	St. Augustine	Design 1023 ship	For United States Shipping Board.				
9 April	United States	Union Iron Works	San Francisco, California	William Jones	Clemson-class destroyer	For United States Navy.				
10 April	United States	Bath Iron Works	Bath, Maine	Aaron Ward	Wickes-class destroyer	For United States Navy.				
10 April	United States	Columbia River Shipbuilding	Portland, Oregon	West Hargrave	Design 1013 ship	For United States Shipping Board.				
11 April	United States	Fore River Shipyard	Quincy, Massachusetts	Aulick	Clemson-class destroyer	For United States Navy.				
11 April	United States	Northwest Steel	Portland, Oregon	Peer Lodge	Design 1013 ship	For United States Shipping Board.				
12 April	United States	Great Lakes Engineering Works	Ashtabula, Ohio	Craigrownie	Design 1060 ship	For United States Shipping Board.				
12 April	United States	Alameda Works Shipyard	Alameda, California	Deroche	Design 1047 ship	For United States Shipping Board.				
12 April	United States	Union Iron Works	San Francisco, California	Hogan	Wickes-class destroyer	For United States Navy.				
12 April	United States	Bethlehem Sparrows Point	Sparrows Point, Maryland	Hugeton	Design 1047 ship	For United States Shipping Board.				
12 April	United States	American Shipbuilding Company	Buffalo, New York	Lake Fugard	Design 1093 ship	For United States Shipping Board.				
12 April	United States	Squantum Victory Yard	Quincy, Massachusetts	Morris	Clemson-class destroyer	For United States Navy.				
12 April	United States	Skinner & Eddy	Seattle, Washington	Polybius	Design 1079 ship	For United States Shipping Board.				
12 April	United States	American International Shipbuilding	Hog Island, Pennsylvania	Satartia	Design 1022 ship	For United States Shipping Board.				
12 April	United States	Baltimore Dry Dock and Shipbuilding Company	Baltimore, Maryland	Yesoking	Design 1016 ship	For United States Shipping Board.				
13 April	United States	Submarine Boat Corporation	Newark, New Jersey	Bethlehem Bridge	Design 1023 ship	For United States Shipping Board.				
13 April	United States	Submarine Boat Corporation	Newark, New Jersey	Hillsborough County	Design 1023 ship	For United States Shipping Board.				
14 April	United States	American Shipbuilding Company	Lorain, Ohio	Lake Frio	Design 1093 ship	For United States Shipping Board.				
14 April	United States	American Shipbuilding Company	Lorain, Ohio	Lake Frohna	Design 1093 ship	For United States Shipping Board.				
15 April	United Kingdom	Harland & Wolff	Belfast	Glenade	Cargo Ship	For Glen Line.				
16 April	United States	American International Shipbuilding	Hog Island, Pennsylvania	Kishacoquillas	Design 1022 ship	For United States Shipping Board.				
16 April	United States	Todd Dry Dock and Construction Company	Tacoma, Washington	Remus	Design 1014 ship	For United States Shipping Board .				
16 April	United States	Southwestern Shipbuilding Company	San Pedro, California	West Cawthon	Design 1019 ship	For United States Shipping Board.				
16 April	United States	Columbia River Shipbuilding	Portland, Oregon	West Quechee	Design 1013 ship	For United States Shipping Board.				
17 April	United States	Federal Shipbuilding	Kearny, New Jersey	Lorain	Design 1037 ship	For United States Shipping Board.				
17 April	United States	Fore River Shipyard	Quincy, Massachusetts	R-8	R-class submarine	For United States Navy.				
17 April	United States	G. M. Standifer Construction	Vancouver, Washington	Waban	Design 1015 ship	For United States Shipping Board.				
19 April	United States	Newport News Shipbuilding	Newport News, Virginia	Branch	Clemson-class destroyer	For United States Navy.				
19 April	United States	Great Lakes Engineering Works	Ecorse, Michigan	Covedale	Design 1060 ship	For United States Shipping Board.				
19 April	United States	Skinner & Eddy	Seattle, Washington	Edgewood	Design 1079 ship	For United States Shipping Board.				
19 April	United States	Submarine Boat Corporation	Newark, New Jersey	Jackson	Design 1023 ship	For United States Shipping Board.				
19 April	United States	Submarine Boat Corporation	Newark, New Jersey	Shortsville	Design 1023 ship	For United States Shipping Board.				
19 April	United States	Oscar Daniels Company	Tampa, Florida	Wilscox	Design 1027 ship	For United States Shipping Board.				
20 April	United States	Standard Shipbuilding Corporation	Shooters Island, New York	Glen Ridge	Design 1063 ship	For United States Shipping Board.				
21 April	United States	American Shipbuilding Company	Buffalo, New York	Lake Furley	Design 1093 ship	For United States Shipping Board.				
22 April	United States	Newburgh Shipyards	Newburgh, New York	Gold Spring	Design 1025 ship	For United States Shipping Board.				
22 April	United States	American International Shipbuilding	Hog Island, Pennsylvania	Shroon	Design 1022 ship	For United States Shipping Board.				
22 April	United States	Union Iron Works	San Francisco, California	S. P. Lee	Clemson-class destroyer	For United States Navy.				
23 April	United States	Albina Engine & Machine Works	Portland, Oregon	Glymont	Design 1049 ship	For United States Shipping Board.				
23 April	United States	New York Shipbuilding	Camden, New Jersey	Schenck	Wickes-class destroyer	For United States Navy.				
23 April	United States	Northwest Steel	Portland, Oregon	Tripp	Design 1013 ship	For United States Shipping Board.				
24 April	United States	New York Shipbuilding	Camden, New Jersey	Brooks	Clemson-class destroyer	For United States Navy.				
24 April	United States	American Shipbuilding Company	Wyandotte, Michigan	Lake Gilboa	Design 1099 ship	For United States Shipping Board.				
24 April	United States	Squantum Victory Yard	Quincy, Massachusetts	Tingey	Clemson-class destroyer	For United States Navy.				
25 April	United States	Chester Shipbuilding Corporation	Chester, Pennsylvania	Ipswich	Cargo ship	Requisitioned by the United States Shipping Board.				
26 April	United States	Union Construction Company	Oakland, California	Hatchie	Design 1015 ship	For United States Shipping Board.				
26 April	United States	William Cramp & Sons	Philadelphia, Pennsylvania	Hovey	Clemson-class destroyer	For United States Navy.				
26 April	United States	Union Iron Works	San Francisco, California	Howard	Wickes-class destroyer	For United States Navy.				
26 April	United States	Submarine Boat Corporation	Newark, New Jersey	Johnston City	Design 1023 ship	For United States Shipping Board.				
26 April	United States	William Cramp & Sons	Philadelphia, Pennsylvania	Long	Clemson-class destroyer	For United States Navy.				
26 April	United States	Fore River Shipyard	Quincy, Massachusetts	Rodgers	Clemson-class destroyer	For United States Navy.				
26 April	United States	American International Shipbuilding	Hog Island, Pennsylvania	Scantic	Design 1022 ship	For United States Shipping Board.				
26 April	United States	J. F. Duthie & Company	Seattle, Washington	West Hematite	Design 1013 ship	For United States Shipping Board.				
26 April	United States	Ames Shipbuilding and Dry Dock Company	Seattle, Washington	West Islay	Design 1080 ship	For United States Shipping Board.				
26 April	United States	Long Beach Shipbuilding Company	Long Beach, California	West Keene	Design 1019 ship	For United States Shipping Board.				
26 April	United States	Federal Shipbuilding	Kearny, New Jersey	Youngstown	Design 1037 ship	For United States Shipping Board.				
27 April	United States	Great Lakes Engineering Works	Ecorse, Michigan	Coverun	Design 1060 ship	For United States Shipping Board.				
27 April	United States	Moore Shipbuilding Company	Oakland, California	Miskianza	Design 1041 ship	For United States Shipping Board.				
27 April	United States	Moore Shipbuilding Company	Oakland, California	Nokatay	Design 1015 ship	For United States Shipping Board.				
27 April	United States	Moore Shipbuilding Company	Oakland, California	Norkum	Design 1015 ship	For United States Shipping Board.				
28 April	United States	Philadelphia Navy Yard	Philadelphia, Pennsylvania	Sandpiper	Lapwing-class minesweeper	For United States Navy.				
29 April	United States	Bethlehem Elizabethport	Elizabeth, New Jersey	Barrenfork	Design 1035 tug	For United States Shipping Board.				
29 April	United States	Bethlehem Elizabethport	Elizabeth, New Jersey	Barrytown	Design 1035 tug	For United States Shipping Board.				
29 April	United States	American Shipbuilding Company	Cleveland, Ohio	Lake Farabee	Design 1099 ship	For United States Shipping Board.				
29 April	United States	American Shipbuilding Company	Wyandotte, Michigan	Lake Gilpen	Design 1099 ship	For United States Shipping Board.				
29 April	United Kingdom	Harland & Wolff	Belfast	War Dahlia	B-type cargo ship	For African Steamship Co.				
29 April	United Kingdom	Harland & Wolff	Belfast	War Pampas	A-type cargo ship	For African Steamship Co.				
30 April	United States	Great Lakes Engineering Works	Ashtabula, Ohio	Crabtree	Design 1060 ship	For United States Shipping Board.				
30 April	United States	Chester Shipbuilding Corporation	Chester, Pennsylvania	Burnwell	Tanker	Requisitioned by the United States Shipping Board.				
30 April	United States	Submarine Boat Corporation	Newark, New Jersey	Brasher	Design 1023 ship	For United States Shipping Board.				
30 April	United States	Submarine Boat Corporation	Newark, New Jersey	Jefferson County	Design 1023 ship	For United States Shipping Board.				
30 April	United States	American Shipbuilding Company	Superior, Wisconsin	Lake Farmingdale	Design 1099 ship	For United States Shipping Board.				
30 April	United States	New York Naval Shipyard	Brooklyn, New York	Tennessee	Tennessee-class battleship	For United States Navy.				
30 April	United Kingdom	Harland & Wolff	Belfast	War Justice	N-type cargo ship	For British Shipping Controller.				

== May ==
Date	Ship	Class	Builder	Location	Country	Notes	McDougall-Duluth Shipbuilding Company	Duluth, Minnesota	1 May	United States
Chantier	Design 1020 ship	For United States Shipping Board.								
1 May	United States	American Shipbuilding Company	Lorain, Ohio	Lake Frolono	Design 1093 ship	For United States Shipping Board.				
1 May	United States	Union Iron Works	San Francisco, California	Nicholas	Clemson-class destroyer	For United States Navy.				
3 May	United States	Atlantic Corporation	Portsmouth, New Hampshire	Babboosic	Design 1019 ship	For United States Shipping Board.				
3 May	United States	American International Shipbuilding	Hog Island, Pennsylvania	Blair	Design 1022 ship	For United States Shipping Board.				
3 May	United States	Bethlehem Sparrows Point	Sparrows Point, Maryland	Huachuca	Design 1046 ship	For United States Shipping Board.				
3 May	United States	Toledo Shipbuilding Company	Toledo, Ohio	Lake Festus	Design 1099 ship	For United States Shipping Board.				
3 May	United States	American Shipbuilding Company	Lorain, Ohio	Lake Frugality	Design 1093 ship	For United States Shipping Board.				
3 May	United States	Northwest Steel	Portland, Oregon	West Chatala	Design 1013 ship	For United States Shipping Board.				
3 May	United States	Columbia River Shipbuilding	Portland, Oregon	West Harlan	Design 1013 ship	For United States Shipping Board.				
4 May	United States	Pacific Coast Shipbuilding Company	Bay Point, California	Cockaponset	Design 1015 ship	For United States Shipping Board.				
4 May	United States	Western Pipe & Steel	South San Francisco, California	West Cactus	Design 1019 ship	For United States Shipping Board.				
5 May	United States	Saginaw Shipbuilding Company	Saginaw, Michigan	Lake Candelaria	Design 1020 ship	For United States Shipping Board.				
6 May	United States	Albina Engine & Machine Works	Portland, Oregon	Glyndon	Design 1049 ship	For United States Shipping Board.				
6 May	United States	Todd Dry Dock and Construction Company	Tacoma, Washington	Ossining	Design 1014 ship	For United States Shipping Board.				
6 May	United States	Merchant Shipbuilding Corporation	Harriman, Pennsylvania	Waxahachie	Design 1025 ship	For United States Shipping Board.				
7 May	United States	Squantum Victory Yard	Quincy, Massachusetts	Swasey	Clemson-class destroyer	For United States Navy.				
8 May	United States	Columbia River Shipbuilding	Portland, Oregon	City of Eureka	Design 1013 ship	For United States Shipping Board.				
8 May	United States	Skinner & Eddy	Seattle, Washington	Elridge	Design 1079 ship	For United States Shipping Board.				
8 May	United States	New York Shipbuilding	Camden, New Jersey	Herbert	Wickes-class destroyer	For United States Navy.				
8 May	United States	Fore River Shipyard	Quincy, Massachusetts	Welles	Clemson-class destroyer	For United States Navy.				
8 May	United States	Union Iron Works	San Francisco, California	Young	Clemson-class destroyer	For United States Navy.				
10 May	United States	Pusey & Jones	Gloucester City, New Jersey	Abraham Lincoln	Cargo ship	Requisitioned by the United States Shipping Board				
10 May	United States	Skinner & Eddy	Seattle, Washington	Edisto	Design 1079 ship	For United States Shipping Board.				
10 May	United States	Manitowoc, Wisconsin	Manitowoc Shipbuilding Company	Lake Gadsden	Design 1074 ship	For United States Shipping Board.				
10 May	United States	American International Shipbuilding	Hog Island, Pennsylvania	Shaume	Design 1022 ship	For United States Shipping Board.				
12 May	United States	Pusey & Jones	Wilmington, Delaware	Knights Island	Cargo ship	Requisitioned by the United States Shipping Board				
12 May	United States	American Shipbuilding Company	Wyandotte, Michigan	Lake Giltedge	Design 1099 ship	For United States Shipping Board.				
12 May	United States	Los Angeles Shipbuilding and Dry Dock Company	San Pedro, California	West Hika	Design 1013 ship	For United States Shipping Board.				
14 May	United States	William Cramp & Sons	Philadelphia, Pennsylvania	Broome	Clemson-class destroyer	For United States Navy.				
14 May	United States	Alameda Works Shipyard	Alameda, California	Devolente	Design 1047 ship	For United States Shipping Board.				
14 May	United States	Union Iron Works	San Francisco, California	Sloat	Clemson-class destroyer	For United States Navy.				
14 May	United States	Southwestern Shipbuilding Company	San Pedro, California	West Chetac	Design 1019 ship	For United States Shipping Board.				
15 May	United States	Submarine Boat Corporation	Newark, New Jersey	Dade County	Design 1023 ship	For United States Shipping Board.				
15 May	United States	Lake Torpedo Boat	Bridgeport, Connecticut	R-25	R-class submarine	For United States Navy.				
15 May	United States	Submarine Boat Corporation	Newark, New Jersey	St. Johns County	Design 1023 ship	For United States Shipping Board.				
15 May	United Kingdom	Harland & Wolff	Belfast	War Liberty	N-type cargo ship	For British Shipping Controller.				
15 May	United States	Ames Shipbuilding and Dry Dock Company	Seattle, Washington	West Isleta	Design 1080 ship	For United States Shipping Board.				
16 May	United States	Union Iron Works	San Francisco, California	Stansbury	Wickes-class destroyer	For United States Navy.				
16 May	United States	Merchant Shipbuilding Corporation	Harriman, Pennsylvania	Winyah	Design 1025 ship	For United States Shipping Board.				
17 May	United States	American Shipbuilding Company	Lorain, Ohio	Lake Frumet	Design 1093 ship	For United States Shipping Board.				
17 May	United States	Northwest Engineering Works	Green Bay, Wisconsin	Moositauka	Design 1035 tug	For United States Shipping Board.				
17 May	United States	Fore River Shipyard	Quincy, Massachusetts	Turner	Clemson-class destroyer	For United States Navy.				
17 May	United States	G. M. Standifer Construction	Vancouver, Washington	Wawalona	Design 1015 ship	For United States Shipping Board.				
19 May	United States	Providence Engineering Works	Providence, Rhode Island	Battleboro	Design 1035 tug	For United States Shipping Board.				
19 May	United States	Union Construction Company	Oakland, California	Hathaway	Design 1015 ship	For United States Shipping Board.				
20 May	United States	Great Lakes Engineering Works	Ecorse, Michigan	Lake Elkwood	Design 1074 ship	For United States Shipping Board.				
20 May	United States	American Shipbuilding Company	Wyandotte, Michigan	Lake Gilta	Design 1099 ship	For United States Shipping Board.				
20 May	United States	American Shipbuilding Company	Superior, Wisconsin	Lake Farragut	Design 1099 ship	For United States Shipping Board.				
20 May	United States	American International Shipbuilding	Hog Island, Pennsylvania	Ogontz	Design 1022 ship	For United States Shipping Board.				
21 May	United States	Bethlehem Elizabethport	Elizabeth, New Jersey	Buttercup	Design 1035 tug	For United States Shipping Board.				
21 May	United States	Bethlehem Elizabethport	Elizabeth, New Jersey	Butterfield	Design 1035 tug	For United States Shipping Board.				
21 May	United States	Manitowoc Shipbuilding Company	Manitowoc, Wisconsin	Lake Savus	Design 1074 ship	For United States Shipping Board.				
21 May	United States	Northwest Steel	Portland, Oregon	West Segovia	Design 1013 ship	For United States Shipping Board.				
21 May	United States	Saginaw Shipbuilding Company	Saginaw, Michigan	Unnamed	Design 1074 ship	For United States Shipping Board.				
22 May	United States	Albina Engine & Machine Works	Portland, Oregon	Meriden	Design 1049 ship	For United States Shipping Board.				
23 May	United States	Whitney Bros. Company	Superior, Wisconsin	Humrick	Design 1035 tug	For United States Shipping Board.				
23 May	United States	Western Pipe & Steel	South San Francisco, California	West Caddoa	Design 1019 ship	For United States Shipping Board.				
23 May	United States	Columbia River Shipbuilding	Portland, Oregon	West Nooska	Design 1013 ship	For United States Shipping Board.				
24 May	United States	Federal Shipbuilding	Kearny, New Jersey	Ambridge	Design 1037 ship	For United States Shipping Board.				
24 May	United States	Standard Shipbuilding Corporation	Shooters Island, New York	Bannack	Design 1063 ship	For United States Shipping Board.				
24 May	United States	Submarine Boat Corporation	Newark, New Jersey	Bay Head	Design 1023 ship	For United States Shipping Board.				
24 May	United States	Federal Shipbuilding	Kearny, New Jersey	Belifort	Design 1037 ship	For United States Shipping Board.				
24 May	United States	Virginia Shipbuilding Corporation	Alexandria, Virginia	Betsy Bell	Design 1015 ship	For United States Shipping Board.				
24 May	United States	Submarine Boat Corporation	Newark, New Jersey	Boston Bridge	Design 1023 ship	For United States Shipping Board.				
24 May	United States	Great Lakes Engineering Works	Ashtabula, Ohio	Craigsmere	Design 1060 ship	For United States Shipping Board.				
24 May	United States	Skinner & Eddy	Seattle, Washington	Edmore	Design 1079 ship	For United States Shipping Board.				
24 May	United States	Pensacola Shipbuilding Company	Pensacola, Florida	Escambia	Design 1025 ship	For United States Shipping Board.				
24 May	United States	New York Shipbuilding	Camden, New Jersey	Gilmer	Clemson-class destroyer	For United States Navy.				
24 May	United States	Whitney Bros. Company	Superior, Wisconsin	Keshena	Design 1035 tug	For United States Shipping Board.				
24 May	United States	American Shipbuilding Company	Cleveland, Ohio	Lake Farber	Design 1099 ship	For United States Shipping Board.				
24 May	United States	Chester Shipbuilding Corporation	Chester, Pennsylvania	Lock Port	Cargo ship	Requisitioned by the United States Shipping Board				
24 May	United States	Squantum Victory Yard	Quincy, Massachusetts	Meade	Clemson-class destroyer	For United States Navy.				
24 May	United States	Downey Shipbuilding Corporation	Staten Island, New York	New Britain	Design 1017 ship	For United States Shipping Board.				
24 May	United States	Fore River Shipyard	Quincy, Massachusetts	R-9	R-class submarine	For United States Navy.				
24 May	United States	American International Shipbuilding	Hog Island, Pennsylvania	Salvation Lass	Design 1022 ship	For United States Shipping Board.				
24 May	United States	Fore River Shipyard	Quincy, Massachusetts	AA-3	AA-1-class submarine	For United States Navy.				
24 May	United States	New York Shipbuilding	Camden, New Jersey	Wenatchee	Design 1029 ship	For United States Shipping Board.				
25 May	United States	Newburgh, New York	Newburgh Shipyards	Firthcliffe	Design 1025 ship	For United States Shipping Board.				
26 May	United States	Philadelphia Navy Yard	Philadelphia, Pennsylvania	Vireo	Lapwing-class minesweeper	For United States Navy.				
26 May	United States	Long Beach Shipbuilding Company	Long Beach, California	West Katan	Design 1019 ship	For United States Shipping Board.				
27 May	United States	Submarine Boat Corporation	Newark, New Jersey	Davidson County	Design 1023 ship	For United States Shipping Board.				
27 May	United States	Submarine Boat Corporation	Newark, New Jersey	Wallkill	Design 1023 ship	For United States Shipping Board.				
28 May	United States	American Shipbuilding Company	Wyandotte, Michigan	Lake Gitano	Design 1099 ship	For United States Shipping Board.				
28 May	United States	Union Iron Works	San Francisco, California	Wood	Clemson-class destroyer	For United States Navy.				
28 May	United States	Union Iron Works	San Francisco, California	Zeign	Clemson-class destroyer	For United States Navy.				
29 May	United States	Federal Shipbuilding	Kearny, New Jersey	Clairton	Design 1037 ship	For United States Shipping Board.				
29 May	United States	Fore River Shipyard	Quincy, Massachusetts	Gillis	Clemson-class destroyer	For United States Navy.				
29 May	United States	Bath Iron Works	Bath, Maine	Hale	Wickes-class destroyer	For United States Navy.				
29 May	United Kingdom	Blyth Shipbuilding & Dry Docks Co. Ltd	Blyth	Hazleside	Cargo ship	For Charlton Steam Shipping Co. Ltd.				
29 May	United Kingdom	Hawthorn Leslie and Company	Hebburn	Montrose	Admiralty type flotilla leader	For Royal Navy.				
29 May	United States	San Francisco Shipbuilding Company	Oakland, California	Palo Alto	Design 1100tanker	For private owner.				
29 May	United States	Southwestern Shipbuilding Company	San Pedro, California	West Cayote	Design 1019 ship	For United States Shipping Board.				
29 May	United Kingdom	Harland & Wolff	Belfast	Yorkshire	Passenger ship	For Bibby Steamship Co.				
30 May	United States	Submarine Boat Corporation	Newark, New Jersey	Assinippi	Design 1023 ship	For United States Shipping Board.				
30 May	United States	Submarine Boat Corporation	Newark, New Jersey	Calno	Design 1023 ship	For United States Shipping Board.				
30 May	United States	American International Shipbuilding	Hog Island, Pennsylvania	Lehigh	Design 1022 ship	For United States Shipping Board.				
30 May	United States	American International Shipbuilding	Hog Island, Pennsylvania	Luxpalile	Design 1022 ship	For United States Shipping Board.				
30 May	United States	American International Shipbuilding	Hog Island, Pennsylvania	Maiden Creek	Design 1022 ship	For United States Shipping Board.				
30 May	United States	American International Shipbuilding	Hog Island, Pennsylvania	Nedmac	Design 1022 ship	For United States Shipping Board.				
31 May	United States	Baltimore Dry Dock and Shipbuilding Company	Baltimore, Maryland	Benoni	Design 1016 ship	For United States Shipping Board.				
30 May	United States	Submarine Boat Corporation	Newark, New Jersey	Pawtucket	Design 1023 ship	For United States Shipping Board.				
30 May	United States	American International Shipbuilding	Hog Island, Pennsylvania	Pipestone County	Design 1022 ship	For United States Shipping Board.				
31 May	United States	Newport News Shipbuilding	Newport News, Virginia	Dallas	Clemson-class destroyer	For United States Navy.				
31 May	United States	Newport News Shipbuilding	Newport News, Virginia	Herndon	Clemson-class destroyer	For United States Navy.				
31 May	United States	Saginaw Shipbuilding Company	Saginaw, Michigan	Lake Cannonsburg	Design 1020 ship	For United States Shipping Board.				
31 May	United States	Manitowoc Shipbuilding Company	Manitowoc, Wisconsin	Lake Galata	Design 1074 ship	For United States Shipping Board.				
31 May	United States	Merchant Shipbuilding Corporation	Harriman, Pennsylvania	Neshaminy	Design 1025 ship	For United States Shipping Board.				
31 May	United States	Bayles Shipyard	Port Jefferson, New York	Osiris	Cargo ship	For United States Shipping Board.				
31 May	Norway	Karljohansvern	Horten	Trygg	Trygg-class torpedo boat	For Royal Norwegian Navy				
31 May	United Kingdom	I. J. Abdela & Mitchell Ltd.	Queensferry	Warita	Coaster	For John Summers & Sons.				

== June ==
Date	Ship	Class	Builder	Location	Country	Notes	Squantum Victory Yard	Quincy, Massachusetts	2 June	United States
Sinclair	Clemson-class destroyer	For United States Navy.								
2 June	United States	J. F. Duthie & Company	Seattle, Washington	West Henshaw	Design 1013 ship	For United States Shipping Board.				
3 June	United Kingdom	Lithgow's Ltd	Port Glasgow	Empirestar	Refrigerated cargo liner	For Empirestar Steamship Co. Ltd.				
3 June	United States	Whitney Bros. Company	Superior, Wisconsin	Kiron	Design 1035 tug	For United States Shipping Board.				
4 June	United States	Hanlon Dry Dock and Shipbuilding	Oakland, California	Dellwood	Design 1043 ship	For United States Shipping Board.				
4 June	United States	Todd Dry Dock and Construction Company	Tacoma, Washington	Zarembo	Design 1014 ship	For United States Shipping Board.				
6 June	United States	Columbia River Shipbuilding	Portland, Oregon	Mount Evans	Design 1013 ship	For United States Shipping Board.				
7 June	United States	William Cramp & Sons	Philadelphia, Pennsylvania	Alden	Clemson-class destroyer	For United States Navy.				
7 June	United States	Skinner & Eddy	Seattle, Washington	Elmsport	Design 1079 ship	For United States Shipping Board.				
7 June	United States	American International Shipbuilding	Hog Island, Pennsylvania	Fluor Spar	Design 1022 ship	For United States Shipping Board.				
7 June	United States	Bethlehem Elizabethport	Elizabeth, New Jersey	Kewanee	Tanker	Requisitioned by the United States Shipping Board.				
7 June	United States	Toledo Shipbuilding Company	Toledo, Ohio	Lake Fibre	Design 1099 ship	For United States Shipping Board.				
7 June	United States	American Shipbuilding Company	Buffalo, New York	Lake Furlough	Design 1093 ship	For United States Shipping Board.				
7 June	United States	Moore Shipbuilding Company	Oakland, California	Mehanno	Design 1015 ship	For United States Shipping Board.				
7 June	United States	Baltimore Dry Dock and Shipbuilding Company	Baltimore, Maryland	Redwing	Lapwing-class minesweeper	For United States Navy.				
7 June	United States	Saginaw Shipbuilding Company	Saginaw, Michigan	Unnamed	Design 1074 ship	For United States Shipping Board.				
9 June	United States	American Shipbuilding Company	Lorain, Ohio	Lake Fanbush	Design 1099 ship	For United States Shipping Board.				
9 June	United States	McDougall-Duluth Shipbuilding Company	Duluth, Minnesota	Lake Flagon	Design 1099 ship	For United States Shipping Board.				
10 June	United States	Great Lakes Engineering Works	Ecorse, Michigan	Lake Elkwater	Design 1074 ship	For United States Shipping Board.				
11 June	United States	Manitowoc Shipbuilding Company	Manitowoc, Wisconsin	Lake Gaither	Design 1074 ship	For United States Shipping Board.				
11 June	United States	Puget Sound Navy Yard	Bremerton, Washington	Sciota	Bagaduce-class tug	For United States Navy.				
11 June	United Kingdom	Harland & Wolff	Belfast	War Jonquil	A-type cargo ship	For British Shipping Controller.				
12 June	United States	Staten Island Shipbuilding Company	Mariners Harbor, New York	Algorma	Bagaduce-class tug	For United States Navy.				
12 June	United States	Seattle North Pacific Shipbuilding Company	Seattle, Washington	Askawake	Design 1015 ship	For United States Shipping Board.				
12 June	United States	Pacific Coast Shipbuilding Company	Bay Point, California	Mohinkis	Design 1015 ship	For United States Shipping Board.				
12 June	United States	Albina Engine & Machine Works	Portland, Oregon	Doylestown	Design 1049 ship	For United States Shipping Board.				
12 June	United States	New York Shipbuilding	Camden, New Jersey	Fox	Clemson-class destroyer	For United States Navy.				
12 June	United States	Bethlehem Sparrows Point	Sparrows Point, Maryland	Huguenot	Design 1047 ship	For United States Shipping Board.				
12 June	United States	Merchant Shipbuilding Corporation	Harriman, Pennsylvania	Mercer Victory	Design 1025 ship	For United States Shipping Board.				
12 June	United States	Downey Shipbuilding Corporation	Staten Island, New York	Richmond Boro	Design 1017 ship	For United States Shipping Board.				
12 June	United States	Oscar Daniels Company	Tampa, Florida	Tampa	Design 1027 ship	For United States Shipping Board.				
12 June	United Kingdom	Harland & Wolff	Belfast	War Triumph	A-type cargo ship	For British Shipping Controller.				
14 June	United States	Union Construction Company	Oakland, California	City of Berkeley	Design 1015 ship	For United States Shipping Board.				
14 June	United States	Skinner & Eddy	Seattle, Washington	City of Spokane	Design 1105 ship	For United States Shipping Board.				
14 June	United States	Whitney Bros. Company	Superior, Wisconsin	Kitchi	Design 1035 tug	For United States Shipping Board.				
14 June	United States	American Shipbuilding Company	Wyandotte, Michigan	Lake Girth	Design 1099 ship	For United States Shipping Board.				
14 June	United States	American Shipbuilding Company	Wyandotte, Michigan	Lake Glasco	Design 1099 ship	For United States Shipping Board.				
14 June	United States	American International Shipbuilding	Hog Island, Pennsylvania	Liberty Glo	Design 1022 ship	For United States Shipping Board.				
14 June	United States	Squantum Victory Yard	Quincy, Massachusetts	McCawley	Clemson-class destroyer	For United States Navy.				
14 June	United States	Sun Shipbuilding Company	Chester, Pennsylvania	S. B. Hunt	Tanker	Requisitioned by the United States Shipping Board.				
14 June	United States	Federal Shipbuilding	Kearny, New Jersey	Westmoreland	Design 1037 ship	For United States Shipping Board.				
15 June	France	Forges et Chantiers de la Méditerranée	Le Havre	Charbonnier	Steel, twin-screw steamer; 1,064 GRT	For French Government (Département de la marine marchand)				
16 June	United States	American Shipbuilding Company	Superior, Wisconsin	Lake Farrar	Design 1099 ship	For United States Shipping Board.				
16 June	United States	Submarine Boat Corporation	Newark, New Jersey	Pontia	Design 1023 ship	For United States Shipping Board.				
16 June	United States	Submarine Boat Corporation	Newark, New Jersey	Woodmansie	Design 1023 ship	For United States Shipping Board.				
17 June	United States	Merchant Shipbuilding Corporation	Harriman, Pennsylvania	Costigan	Design 1025 ship	For United States Shipping Board.				
18 June	United States	Pusey & Jones	Wilmington, Delaware	Fire Island	Cargo ship	Requisitioned by the United States Shipping Board.				
18 June	United States	Lake Torpedo Boat	Bridgeport, Connecticut	R-26	R-class submarine	For United States Navy.				
19 June	United States	Staten Island Shipbuilding Company	Mariners Harbor, New York	Carrabasset	Bagaduce-class tug	For United States Navy.				
19 June	United States	American International Shipbuilding	Hog Island, Pennsylvania	Corson	Design 1022 ship	For United States Shipping Board.				
19 June	United States	Alameda, California	Alameda Works Shipyard	Dilwin	Design 1047 ship	For United States Shipping Board.				
20 June	United States	Union Iron Works	San Francisco, California	Shirk	Clemson-class destroyer	For United States Navy.				
20 June	United States	Northwest Steel	Portland, Oregon	West Cheswald	Design 1013 ship	For United States Shipping Board.				
21 June	United States	Virginia Shipbuilding Corporation	Alexandria, Virginia	Vanada	Design 1015 ship	For United States Shipping Board.				
21 June	United States	J. F. Duthie & Company	Seattle, Washington	West Hepburn	Design 1013 ship	For United States Shipping Board.				
21 June	United States	Southwestern Shipbuilding Company	San Pedro, California	West Inskip	Design 1019 ship	For United States Shipping Board.				
22 June	United States	Fore River Shipyard	Quincy, Massachusetts	Watertown	Design 1045 ship	For United States Shipping Board.				
23 June	United States	McDougall-Duluth Shipbuilding Company	Duluth, Minnesota	Lake Flagstaff	Design 1099 ship	For United States Shipping Board.				
24 June	United States	American Shipbuilding Company	Cleveland, Ohio	Lake Faribault	Design 1099 ship	For United States Shipping Board.				
24 June	United States	Pensacola Shipbuilding Company	Pensacola, Florida	Noccalula	Design 1025 ship	For United States Shipping Board.				
24 June	United States	Moore Shipbuilding Company	Oakland, California	Quabbin	Design 1041 ship	For United States Shipping Board.				
24 June	United States	Ames Shipbuilding and Dry Dock Company	Seattle, Washington	West Islip	Design 1080 ship	For United States Shipping Board.				
25 June	United States	American International Shipbuilding	Hog Island, Pennsylvania	Casper	Design 1022 ship	For United States Shipping Board.				
25 June	United States	Submarine Boat Corporation	Newark, New Jersey	Delavan	Design 1023 ship	For United States Shipping Board.				
25 June	United States	Ferguson Steel & Iron	Buffalo, New York	Kewaydin	Bagaduce-class tug	For United States Navy.				
25 June	United States	Todd Dry Dock and Construction Company	Tacoma, Washington	Olen	Design 1014 ship	For United States Shipping Board.				
25 June	United States	Columbia River Shipbuilding	Portland, Oregon	West Harshaw	Design 1013 ship	For United States Shipping Board.				
26 June	United States	Skinner & Eddy	Seattle, Washington	Colorado Springs	Design 1079 ship	For United States Shipping Board.				
26 June	United States	American Shipbuilding Company	Lorain, Ohio	Lake Faulk	Design 1099 ship	For United States Shipping Board.				
26 June	United Kingdom	Harland & Wolff	Belfast	New Mexico	N-type cargo ship	For Elder Dempster.				
26 June	United Kingdom	Harland & Wolff	Belfast	Siris	B-type cargo ship	For Royal Mail Line.				
26 June	United States	Union Iron Works	San Francisco, California	Yarborough	Clemson-class destroyer	For United States Navy.				
27 June	United States	Chester Shipbuilding Corporation	Chester, Pennsylvania	Texarkana	Cargo ship	Requisitioned by the United States Shipping Board.				
28 June	United States	American International Shipbuilding	Hog Island, Pennsylvania	Afel	Design 1022 ship	For United States Shipping Board.				
28 June	United States	Skinner & Eddy	Seattle, Washington	Eelbeck	Design 1105 ship	For United States Shipping Board.				
28 June	United States	Norfolk Navy Yard	Portsmouth, Virginia	Halbert	Clemson-class destroyer	For United States Navy.				
28 June	United States	Squantum Victory Yard	Quincy, Massachusetts	Henshaw	Clemson-class destroyer	For United States Navy.				
28 June	United States	American Shipbuilding Company	Wyandotte, Michigan	Lake Fabyan	Design 1099 ship	For United States Shipping Board.				
28 June	United States	Globe Shipbuilding Company	Superior, Wisconsin	Lake Fiscus	Design 1074 ship	For United States Shipping Board.				
28 June	United States	Squantum Victory Yard	Quincy, Massachusetts	Moody	Clemson-class destroyer	For United States Navy.				
28 June	United States	Norfolk Navy Yard	Portsmouth, Virginia	Noa	Clemson-class destroyer	For United States Navy.				
28 June	United States	Fore River Shipyard	Quincy, Massachusetts	R-10	R-class submarine	For United States Navy.				
28 June	United States	F. F. Ley and Company	Mobile, Alabama	Selma	Design 1100 tanker	For United States Shipping Board.				
30 June	United States	Bethlehem Elizabethport	Elizabeth, New Jersey	Barstow	Design 1035 tug	For United States Shipping Board.				
30 June	United States	Bethlehem Elizabethport	Elizabeth, New Jersey	Bartheny	Design 1035 tug	For United States Shipping Board.				
30 June	United States	Submarine Boat Corporation	Newark, New Jersey	Cambridge	Design 1023 ship	For United States Shipping Board.				
30 June	United States	Alameda Works Shipyard	Alameda, California	Dillworth	Design 1047 ship	For United States Shipping Board.				
30 June	United States	Great Lakes Engineering Works	Ecorse, Michigan	Lake Ellenorah	Design 1074 ship	For United States Shipping Board.				
30 June	United States	American Shipbuilding Company	Lorain, Ohio	Lake Fansdale	Design 1099 ship	For United States Shipping Board.				
June	United Kingdom	I. J. Abdela & Mitchell Ltd.	Queensferry	Foam	Naval drifter	For Royal Navy.				

== July ==
Date	Ship	Class	Builder	Location	Country	Notes	American Shipbuilding Company	Wyandotte, Michigan	1 July	United States
Lake Fablus	Design 1099 ship	For United States Shipping Board.								
1 July	United States	Submarine Boat Corporation	Newark, New Jersey	Waco	Design 1023 ship	For United States Shipping Board.				
2 July	United States	American International Shipbuilding	Hog Island, Pennsylvania	City of Fairbury	Design 1022 ship	For United States Shipping Board.				
2 July	United States	Manitowoc Shipbuilding Company	Manitowoc, Wisconsin	Lake Onawa	Design 1074 ship	For United States Shipping Board.				
2 July	United States	Moore Shipbuilding Company	Oakland, California	Naugus	Design 1015 ship	For United States Shipping Board.				
2 July	United States	Western Pipe & Steel	South San Francisco, California	West Kader	Design 1019 ship	For United States Shipping Board.				
3 July	United States	Submarine Boat Corporation	Newark, New Jersey	Haddon	Design 1023 ship	For United States Shipping Board.				
3 July	United States	McDougall-Duluth Shipbuilding Company	Duluth, Minnesota	Lake Flambeau	Design 1099 ship	For United States Shipping Board.				
3 July	United States	Mobile Shipbuilding Company	Mobile, Alabama	Moshico	Design 1038 ship	For United States Shipping Board.				
3 July	United States	Providence Engineering Works	Providence, Rhode Island	Tagus	Design 1035 tug	For United States Shipping Board.				
4 July	United States	Atlantic Corporation	Portsmouth, New Hampshire	Portsmouth	Design 1019 ship	For United States Shipping Board.				
7 July	United States	Southwestern Shipbuilding Company	San Pedro, California	Bakersfield	Design 1019 ship	For United States Shipping Board.				
7 July	United States	Charleston Navy Yard	Charleston, South Carolina	Tillman	Wickes-class destroyer	For United States Navy.				
8 July	United States	Groton Iron Works	Groton, Connecticut	Nameaug	Design 1016 ship	For United States Shipping Board.				
10 July	United States	Submarine Boat Corporation	Newark, New Jersey	Asquam	Design 1023 ship	For United States Shipping Board.				
10 July	United Kingdom	Harland & Wolff	Belfast	Glenariffe	Cargo ship	For Glen Line.				
10 July	United States	Union Iron Works	San Francisco, California	Kidder	Clemson-class destroyer	For United States Navy.				
10 July	United States	McDougall-Duluth Shipbuilding Company	Duluth, Minnesota	Lake Flanders	Design 1099 ship	For United States Shipping Board.				
10 July	United States	New York Shipbuilding	Camden, New Jersey	Overton	Clemson-class destroyer	For United States Navy.				
10 July	United States	Downey Shipbuilding Corporation	Staten Island, New York	Yaphank	Design 1017 ship	For United States Shipping Board.				
10 July	United States	Saginaw Shipbuilding Company	Saginaw, Michigan	Name unknown	Design 1074 ship	For United States Shipping Board.				
11 July	United States	Federal Shipbuilding	Kearny, New Jersey	Innoko	Design 1037 ship	For United States Shipping Board.				
11 July	United States	Puget Sound Navy Yard	Bremerton, Washington	Koka	Bagaduce-class tug	For United States Navy.				
12 July	United States	Sun Shipbuilding Company	Chester, Pennsylvania	G. H. Jones	Tanker	Requisitioned by the United States Shipping Board.				
12 July	United States	Toledo Shipbuilding Company	Toledo, Ohio	Lake Fielding	Design 1099 ship	For United States Shipping Board.				
12 July	United States	American International Shipbuilding	Hog Island, Pennsylvania	Minnequa	Design 1022 ship	For United States Shipping Board.				
12 July	United States	Northwest Engineering Works	Green Bay, Wisconsin	Vallonia	Design 1035 tug	For United States Shipping Board.				
13 July	United States	Newburgh Shipyards	Newburgh, New York	Irvington	Design 1025 ship	For United States Shipping Board.				
14 July	United States	William Cramp & Sons	Philadelphia, Pennsylvania	Smith Thompson	Clemson-class destroyer	For United States Navy.				
15 July	United States	William Cramp & Sons	Philadelphia, Pennsylvania	Alameda	Design 1128 ship	For United States Shipping Board.				
15 July	United States	New York Shipbuilding	Camden, New Jersey	Champion	Cargo ship	Requisitioned by the United States Shipping Board.				
15 July	United States	Hanlon Dry Dock and Shipbuilding	Oakland, California	Delrosa	Design 1043 ship	For United States Shipping Board.				
15 July	United States	American Shipbuilding Company	Wyandotte, Michigan	Lake Fackler	Design 1099 ship	For United States Shipping Board.				
15 July	United States	Union Iron Works	San Francisco, California	La Valetta	Clemson-class destroyer	For United States Navy.				
15 July	United States	Pacific Coast Shipbuilding Company	Bay Point, California	Sinasta	Design 1015 ship	For United States Shipping Board.				
15 July	United States	Pensacola Shipbuilding Company	Pensacola, Florida	Red Mountain	Design 1025 ship	For United States Shipping Board.				
16 July	United States	Alameda Works Shipyard	Alameda, California	City of Alameda	Design 1047 ship	For United States Shipping Board.				
16 July	United States	American Shipbuilding Company	Lorain, Ohio	Lake Fanquier	Design 1099 ship	For United States Shipping Board.				
16 July	United States	American Shipbuilding Company	Superior, Wisconsin	Lake Stobi	Design 1099 ship	For United States Shipping Board.				
16 July	United States	J. F. Duthie & Company	Seattle, Washington	Seattle Spirit	Design 1013 ship	For United States Shipping Board.				
17 July	United States	American International Shipbuilding	Hog Island, Pennsylvania	Liberty Land	Design 1022 ship	For United States Shipping Board.				
18 July	United States	American International Shipbuilding	Hog Island, Pennsylvania	Lebanon	Design 1022 ship	For United States Shipping Board.				
18 July	United States	Squantum Victory Yard	Quincy, Massachusetts	Meyer	Clemson-class destroyer	For United States Navy.				
19 July	United States	Baltimore Dry Dock and Shipbuilding Company	Baltimore, Maryland	Dauperata	Design 1016 ship	For United States Shipping Board.				
19 July	United States	Whitney Bros. Company	Superior, Wisconsin	Kiokee	Design 1035 tug	For United States Shipping Board.				
19 July	United States	Submarine Boat Corporation	Newark, New Jersey	Lackawanna Valley	Design 1023 ship	For United States Shipping Board.				
19 July	United States	American International Shipbuilding	Hog Island, Pennsylvania	Lafcomo	Design 1022 ship	For United States Shipping Board.				
19 July	United States	Saginaw Shipbuilding Company	Saginaw, Michigan	Lake Fear	Design 1020 ship	For United States Shipping Board.				
19 July	United States	McDougall-Duluth Shipbuilding Company	Duluth, Minnesota	Lake Flatonia	Design 1099 ship	For United States Shipping Board.				
19 July	United States	Great Lakes Engineering Works	Ashtabula, Ohio	Lake Singara	Design 1074 ship	For United States Shipping Board.				
19 July	United States	Texas Steamship Corporation	Bath, Maine	Lightburne	Tanker	Requisitioned by the United States Shipping Board.				
19 July	United States	Todd Dry Dock and Construction Company	Tacoma, Washington	Orcus	Design 1014 ship	For United States Shipping Board.				
19 July	United States	Standard Shipbuilding Corporation	Shooters Island, New York	Rockaway Park	Design 1063 ship	For United States Shipping Board.				
19 July	United States	Oscar Daniels Company	Tampa, Florida	Seminole	Design 1027 ship	For United States Shipping Board.				
19 July	United States	Columbia River Shipbuilding	Portland, Oregon	West Harts	Design 1013 ship	For United States Shipping Board.				
20 July	United States	New York Shipbuilding	Camden, New Jersey	Sea Girt	Design 1029 ship	For United States Shipping Board.				
20 July	United States	Philadelphia Navy Yard	Philadelphia, Pennsylvania	Warbler	Lapwing-class minesweeper	For United States Navy.				
21 July	United States	Skinner & Eddy	Seattle, Washington	Elkridge	Design 1105 ship	For United States Shipping Board.				
21 July	United States	Submarine Boat Corporation	Newark, New Jersey	Fourth Alabama	Design 1023 ship	For United States Shipping Board.				
21 July	United States	G. M. Standifer Construction	Vancouver, Washington	Nismaha	Design 1015 ship	For United States Shipping Board.				
21 July	United States	Fore River Shipyard	Quincy, Massachusetts	R-11	R-class submarine	For United States Navy.				
21 July	United States	Skinner & Eddy	Seattle, Washington	Stanley	Design 1105 ship	For United States Shipping Board.				
22 July	United States	Globe Shipbuilding Company	Superior, Wisconsin	Lake Fisher	Design 1074 ship	For United States Shipping Board.				
23 July	United States	Bethlehem Wilmington	Wilmington, Delaware	Delco	Design 1094 ship	For United States Shipping Board.				
23 July	United States	Union Construction Company	Oakland, California	Hawarden	Design 1015 ship	For United States Shipping Board.				
23 July	United States	American Shipbuilding Company	Wyandotte, Michigan	Lake Fairfex	Design 1099 ship	For United States Shipping Board.				
23 July	United States	Lorain, Ohio	American Shipbuilding Company	Lake Favonia	Design 1099 ship	For United States Shipping Board.				
23 July	United States	Downey Shipbuilding Corporation	Staten Island, New York	Waterbury	Design 1017 ship	For United States Shipping Board.				
24 July	United States	Submarine Boat Corporation	Newark, New Jersey	Ablanset	Design 1023 ship	For United States Shipping Board.				
24 July	United States	Bath Iron Works	Bath, Maine	Crowninshield	Wickes-class destroyer	For United States Navy.				
24 July	United States	American Shipbuilding Company	Cleveland, Ohio	Lake Fariston	Design 1099 ship	For United States Shipping Board.				
24 July	United States	Puget Sound Navy Yard	Bremerton, Washington	Napa	Bagaduce-class tug	For United States Navy.				
25 July	United States	Merchant Shipbuilding Corporation	Harriman, Pennsylvania	Kittegaun	Design 1025 ship	For United States Shipping Board.				
25 July	United States	Union Iron Works	San Francisco, California	Selfridge	Clemson-class destroyer	For United States Navy.				
26 July	United States	Baltimore Dry Dock and Shipbuilding Company	Baltimore, Maryland	Dannedaike	Design 1058 ship	For United States Shipping Board.				
26 July	United States	Squantum Victory Yard	Quincy, Massachusetts	Doyes	Clemson-class destroyer	For United States Navy.				
26 July	United States	Bethlehem Sparrows Point	Sparrows Point, Maryland	Hulaco	Design 1047 ship	For United States Shipping Board.				
26 July	United States	Great Lakes Engineering Works	Ecorse, Michigan	Lake Ellendale	Design 1074 ship	For United States Shipping Board.				
26 July	United States	Newport News Shipbuilding	Newport News, Virginia	Patoka	Design 1106 ship	For United States Shipping Board.				
26 July	United States	American International Shipbuilding	Hog Island, Pennsylvania	Tulsa	Design 1022 ship	For United States Shipping Board.				
26 July	United States	Western Pipe & Steel	South San Francisco, California	West Cadron	Design 1019 ship	For United States Shipping Board.				
26 July	United States	Ames Shipbuilding and Dry Dock Company	Seattle, Washington	West Ison	Design 1080 ship	For United States Shipping Board.				
27 July	United States	Fore River Shipyard	Quincy, Massachusetts	Baldbutte	Design 1045 ship	For United States Shipping Board.				
28 July	United States	New York Shipbuilding	Camden, New Jersey	Humphreys	Clemson-class destroyer	For United States Navy.				
28 July	Japan	Kawasaki	Kobe	Ro-1	Type F1 submarine	For Imperial Japanese Navy				
29 July	United States	Chester Shipbuilding Corporation	Chester, Pennsylvania	Iceland	Cargo ship	Requisitioned by the United States Shipping Board.				
30 July	United States	Union Construction Company	Oakland, California	Havilah	Design 1015 ship	For United States Shipping Board.				
30 July	United States	American International Shipbuilding	Hog Island, Pennsylvania	Labette	Design 1022 ship	For United States Shipping Board.				
30 July	United States	American Shipbuilding Company	Wyandotte, Michigan	Lake Fagundus	Design 1099 ship	For United States Shipping Board.				
30 July	United States	American Shipbuilding Company	Wyandotte, Michigan	Lake Fairly	Design 1099 ship	For United States Shipping Board.				
30 July	United States	Manitowoc Shipbuilding Company	Manitowoc, Wisconsin	Lake Galewood	Design 1074 ship	For United States Shipping Board.				
30 July	United States	Todd Dry Dock and Construction Company	Tacoma, Washington	Ophis	Design 1014 ship	For United States Shipping Board.				
30 July	United States	Federal Shipbuilding	Kearny, New Jersey	Wytherville	Design 1037 ship	For United States Shipping Board.				
31 July	United States	Submarine Boat Corporation	Newark, New Jersey	Asabeth	Design 1023 ship	For United States Shipping Board.				
31 July	United Kingdom	Amble Ferro-Concrete Co. Ltd.	Amble	Cretebow	Concrete tug	For The Shipping Controller.				
31 July	United States	American Shipbuilding Company	Superior, Wisconsin	Lake Falama	Design 1099 ship	For United States Shipping Board.				
31 July	United States	McDougall-Duluth Shipbuilding Company	Duluth, Minnesota	Lake Flattery	Design 1099 ship	For United States Shipping Board.				
31 July	United States	Submarine Boat Corporation	Newark, New Jersey	Lordship Manor	Design 1023 ship	For United States Shipping Board.				
31 July	United States	Alameda Works Shipyard	Alameda, California	Utacarbon	Design 1047 ship	For United States Shipping Board.				

== August ==
Date	Ship	Class	Builder	Location	Country	Notes	Whitney Bros. Company	Superior, Wisconsin	2 August	United States
Kolda	Design 1035 tug	For United States Shipping Board.								
2 August	United States	Merill-Stevens Shipbuilding Corporation	Jacksonville, Florida	Wekika	Design 1012 ship	For United States Shipping Board.				
5 August	United States	Hog Island, Pennsylvania	American International Shipbuilding	Shickshinny	Design 1022 ship	For United States Shipping Board.				
6 August	United States	Bethlehem Elizabethport	Elizabeth, New Jersey	Bartolome	Design 1035 tug	For United States Shipping Board.				
6 August	United States	Bethlehem Elizabethport	Elizabeth, New Jersey	Barwick	Design 1035 tug	For United States Shipping Board.				
6 August	United States	Los Angeles Shipbuilding and Dry Dock Company	San Pedro, California	West Himrod	Design 1013 ship	For United States Shipping Board.				
6 August	United States	Northwest Steel	Portland, Oregon	West Raritans	Design 1013 ship	For United States Shipping Board.				
7 August	United States	Providence Engineering Works	Providence, Rhode Island	Baymead	Design 1035 tug	For United States Shipping Board.				
7 August	United States	Submarine Boat Corporation	Newark, New Jersey	Monantum	Design 1023 ship	For United States Shipping Board.				
7 August	United States	Seattle North Pacific Shipbuilding Company	Seattle, Washington	Orani	Design 1015 ship	For United States Shipping Board.				
8 August	United States	Great Lakes Engineering Works	Ecorse, Michigan	Lake Ellerslie	Design 1074 ship	For United States Shipping Board.				
8 August	United States	American International Shipbuilding	Hog Island, Pennsylvania	Shannock	Design 1022 ship	For United States Shipping Board.				
9 August	United States	Hanlon Dry Dock and Shipbuilding	Oakland, California	Depere	Design 1043 ship	For United States Shipping Board.				
9 August	United States	Moore Shipbuilding Company	Oakland, California	Quillwark	Design 1015 ship	For United States Shipping Board.				
9 August	United States	Columbia River Shipbuilding	Portland, Oregon	West Hartland	Design 1013 ship	For United States Shipping Board.				
9 August	United States	Norfolk Navy Yard	Portsmouth, Virginia	William B. Preston	Clemson-class destroyer	For United States Navy.				
11 August	United States	American Shipbuilding Company	Cleveland, Ohio	Lake Farley	Design 1099 ship	For United States Shipping Board.				
11 August	United States	Union Iron Works	San Francisco, California	Mervine	Clemson-class destroyer	For United States Navy.				
12 August	United States	New York Shipbuilding	Camden, New Jersey	Kane	Clemson-class destroyer	For United States Navy.				
12 August	United States	Mare Island Navy Yard	Vallejo, California	Luchfield	Clemson-class destroyer	For United States Navy.				
12 August	United States	Puget Sound Navy Yard	Bremerton, Washington	Pinola	Bagaduce-class tug	For United States Navy.				
12 August	United States	Squantum Victory Yard	Quincy, Massachusetts	Sharkey	Clemson-class destroyer	For United States Navy.				
12 August	United States	William Cramp & Sons	Philadelphia, Pennsylvania	Tracy	Clemson-class destroyer	For United States Navy.				
12 August	United States	Mare Island Navy Yard	Vallejo, California	Zang	Clemson-class destroyer	For United States Navy.				
13 August	United States	Toledo Shipbuilding Company	Toledo, Ohio	Lake Fife	Design 1099 ship	For United States Shipping Board.				
13 August	United States	American Shipbuilding Company	Wyandotte, Michigan	Lake Inglenook	Design 1099 ship	For United States Shipping Board.				
13 August	United States	Submarine Boat Corporation	Newark, New Jersey	Putnam	Design 1023 ship	For United States Shipping Board.				
14 August	United States	New York Shipbuilding	Camden, New Jersey	Defender	Cargo ship	Requisitioned by the United States Shipping Board.				
14 August	United States	William Cramp & Sons	Philadelphia, Pennsylvania	Kaweah	Design 1128 tanker	For United States Shipping Board.				
14 August	United States	American Shipbuilding Company	Lorain, Ohio	Lake Faxon	Design 1099 ship	For United States Shipping Board.				
14 August	United Kingdom	Harland & Wolff	Belfast	New Texas	N-type cargo ship	For Elder Dempster.				
15 August	United States	American International Shipbuilding	Hog Island, Pennsylvania	Bird City	Design 1022 ship	For United States Shipping Board.				
15 August	United States	Submarine Boat Corporation	Newark, New Jersey	Parksville	Design 1023 ship	For United States Shipping Board.				
15 August	United States	Fore River Shipyard	Quincy, Massachusetts	R-12	R-class submarine	For United States Navy.				
16 August	United States	Submarine Boat Corporation	Newark, New Jersey	Buffalo Bridge	Design 1023 ship	For United States Shipping Board.				
16 August	United States	Skinner & Eddy	Seattle, Washington	Editor	Design 1105 ship	For United States Shipping Board.				
16 August	United States	Ecorse, Michigan	Great Lakes Engineering Works	Lake Ellicott	Design 1074 ship	For United States Shipping Board.				
16 August	United States	Globe Shipbuilding Company	Superior, Wisconsin	Lake Fitch	Design 1074 ship	For United States Shipping Board.				
16 August	United States	Sun Shipbuilding Company	Chester, Pennsylvania	Sunbeam	Tanker	Requisitioned by the United States Shipping Board.				
16 August	United States	Federal Shipbuilding	Kearny, New Jersey	Vincent	Design 1037 ship	For United States Shipping Board.				
16 August	United States	Federal Shipbuilding	Kearny, New Jersey	Winona County	Design 1037 ship	For United States Shipping Board.				
18 August	United States	Northwest Steel	Portland, Oregon	West Pocasset	Design 1013 ship	For United States Shipping Board.				
19 August	United States	Whitney Bros. Company	Superior, Wisconsin	Kaleen	Design 1035 tug	For United States Shipping Board.				
20 August	United States	Great Lakes Engineering Works	Ashtabula, Ohio	Lake Elon	Design 1074 ship	For United States Shipping Board.				
20 August	United States	McDougall-Duluth Shipbuilding Company	Duluth, Minnesota	La Crosse	Design 1099 ship	For United States Shipping Board.				
21 August	United States	Skinner & Eddy	Seattle, Washington	Elkhorn	Design 1105 ship	For United States Shipping Board.				
22 August	United States	Union Iron Works	San Francisco, California	Marcus	Clemson-class destroyer	For United States Navy.				
22 August	United States	Chester Shipbuilding Corporation	Chester, Pennsylvania	Terre Haute	Cargo ship	Requisitioned by the United States Shipping Board.				
23 August	United States	Bayles Shipyard	Port Jefferson, New York	Cloverock	Cargo ship	For United States Shipping Board.				
23 August	United States	Pusey & Jones	Gloucester City, New Jersey	Daniel Webster	Cargo ship	Requisitioned by the United States Shipping Board.				
23 August	United States	J. F. Duthie & Company	Seattle, Washington	Dewey	Design 1013 ship	For United States Shipping Board.				
23 August	United States	Skinner & Eddy	Seattle, Washington	Endicott	Design 1105 ship	For United States Shipping Board.				
23 August	United States	Great Lakes Engineering Works	Ecorse, Michigan	Lake Ellijay	Design 1074 ship	For United States Shipping Board.				
23 August	United States	Saginaw Shipbuilding Company	Saginaw, Michigan	Lake Girardeau	Design 1020 ship	For United States Shipping Board.				
23 August	United States	Pacific Coast Shipbuilding Company	Bay Point, California	Lavada	Design 1015 ship	For United States Shipping Board.				
23 August	United States	American International Shipbuilding	Hog Island, Pennsylvania	Nobles	Design 1022 ship	For United States Shipping Board.				
24 August	United States	Southwestern Shipbuilding Company	San Pedro, California	West Neris	Design 1019 ship	For United States Shipping Board.				
26 August	United States	Ferguson Steel & Iron	Buffalo, New York	Kalmia	Bagaduce-class tug	For United States Navy.				
26 August	Empire of Japan	Uraga Dock Company	Uraga, Kanagawa	Eastern Breeze	Cargo ship	For United States Shipping Board				
27 August	United States	Submarine Boat Corporation	Newark, New Jersey	Clark Mills	Design 1023 ship	For United States Shipping Board.				
27 August	United States	Fore River Shipyard	Quincy, Massachusetts	R-13	R-class submarine	For United States Navy.				
27 August	United States	Portsmouth Navy Yard	Portsmouth, New Hampshire	S-4	S-class submarine	For United States Navy.				
28 August	United States	Great Lakes Engineering Works	Ecorse, Michigan	Lake Ellithorpe	Design 1074 ship	For United States Shipping Board.				
28 August	United Kingdom	Harland & Wolff	Belfast	New Toronto	N-type cargo ship	For Elder Dempster.				
28 August	Japan	Kure Naval Arsenal	Kure	Ro-11	Kaichu II-type submarine	For Imperial Japanese Navy				
28 August	United Kingdom	Harland & Wolff	Belfast	War Poplar	B-type cargo ship	For British Shipping Controller.				
28 August	United States	Ames Shipbuilding and Dry Dock Company	Seattle, Washington	West Ira	Design 1080 ship	For United States Shipping Board.				
29 August	United Kingdom	Swan Hunter & Wigham Richardson	Wallsend	Belgian	Cargo ship	For F. Leyland & Co. Ltd.				
29 August	United States	Submarine Boat Corporation	Newark, New Jersey	Continental Bridge	Design 1023 ship	For United States Shipping Board.				
29 August	United States	Submarine Boat Corporation	Newark, New Jersey	Federal Bridge	Design 1023 ship	For United States Shipping Board.				
29 August	United States	American International Shipbuilding	Hog Island, Pennsylvania	Hog Island	Design 1022 ship	For United States Shipping Board.				
30 August	United States	Bethlehem Elizabethport	Elizabeth, New Jersey	Bascobel	Design 1035 tug	For United States Shipping Board.				
30 August	United States	Bethlehem Elizabethport	Elizabeth, New Jersey	Basford	Design 1035 tug	For United States Shipping Board.				
30 August	United States	Sun Shipbuilding Company	Chester, Pennsylvania	Hanover	Design 1018 ship	For United States Shipping Board.				
30 August	United States	American Shipbuilding Company	Lorain, Ohio	Lake Felden	Design 1099 ship	For United States Shipping Board.				
30 August	United States	Toledo Shipbuilding Company	Toledo, Ohio	Lake Figart	Design 1099 ship	For United States Shipping Board.				
30 August	United States	McDougall-Duluth Shipbuilding Company	Duluth, Minnesota	Lake Strymon	Design 1099 ship	For United States Shipping Board.				
30 August	United States	Submarine Boat Corporation	Newark, New Jersey	Marsodak	Design 1023 ship	For United States Shipping Board.				
30 August	United States	Northwest Engineering Works	Green Bay, Wisconsin	Outagamie	Design 1035 tug	For United States Shipping Board.				
30 August	United States	Standard Shipbuilding Corporation	Shooters Island, New York	Palisades	Design 1063 ship	For United States Shipping Board.				
30 August	United States	Newburgh Shipyards	Newburgh, New York	Peekskill	Design 1025 ship	For United States Shipping Board.				
30 August	United States	Alameda Works Shipyard	Alameda, California	Portola Plumas	Design 1047 ship	For United States Shipping Board.				
30 August	United States	Bethlehem Wilmington	Wilmington, Delaware	Salem County	Design 1031 ship	For United States Shipping Board.				
30 August	United States	Columbia River Shipbuilding	Portland, Oregon	West Hartley	Design 1013 ship	For United States Shipping Board.				

== September ==
Date	Ship	Class	Builder	Location	Country	Notes	Carolina Shipbuilding Corporation	Wilmington, North Carolina	1 September	United States
Cranford	Design 1037 ship	For United States Shipping Board.								
2 September	United States	Union Iron Works	San Francisco, California	Chase	Clemson-class destroyer	For United States Navy.				
5 September	United States	Squantum Victory Yard	Quincy, Massachusetts	Breck	Clemson-class destroyer	For United States Navy.				
5 September	United States	Merchant Shipbuilding Corporation	Harriman, Pennsylvania	Epitacio Pessoa	Design 1025 ship	For United States Shipping Board.				
5 September	United States	Squantum Victory Yard	Quincy, Massachusetts	Toucey	Clemson-class destroyer	For United States Navy.				
6 September	United States	Fore River Shipyard	Quincy, Massachusetts	AA-2	AA-1-class submarine	For United States Navy.				
6 September	United States	Federal Shipbuilding	Kearny, New Jersey	Anaconda	Design 1037 ship	For United States Shipping Board.				
6 September	United States	Bethlehem Sparrows Point	Sparrows Point, Maryland	Antietam	Design 1047 ship	For United States Shipping Board.				
6 September	United States	Skinner & Eddy	Seattle, Washington	Brave Coeur	Design 1105 ship	For United States Shipping Board.				
6 September	United States	Hog Island, Pennsylvania	American International Shipbuilding	Sinsinawa	Design 1022 ship	For United States Shipping Board.				
6 September	United States	Northwest Steel	Portland, Oregon	West Saginaw	Design 1013 ship	For United States Shipping Board.				
7 September	United States	Fore River Shipyard	Quincy, Massachusetts	Baldhill	Design 1045 ship	For United States Shipping Board.				
7 September	United States	Western Pipe & Steel	South San Francisco, California	West Cahokie	Design 1019 ship	For United States Shipping Board.				
8 September	United States	Virginia Shipbuilding Corporation	Alexandria, Virginia	H. F. Morse	Design 1015 ship	For United States Shipping Board.				
10 September	United States	American International Shipbuilding	Hog Island, Pennsylvania	Chickasaw	Design 1022 ship	For United States Shipping Board.				
10 September	United Kingdom	Blyth Shipbuilding & Dry Docks Co. Ltd	Blyth	Daybreak	Cargo ship	For Claymore Shipping Co. Ltd.				
10 September	United States	Skinner & Eddy	Seattle, Washington	Elkton	Design 1105 ship	For United States Shipping Board.				
10 September	United States	Squantum Victory Yard	Quincy, Massachusetts	Isherwood	Clemson-class destroyer	For United States Navy.				
10 September	United States	Todd Dry Dock and Construction Company	Tacoma, Washington	St. Anthony	Design 1014 ship	For United States Shipping Board.				
11 September	United Kingdom	Harland & Wolff	Belfast	Arundel Castle	Passenger ship	For Union-Castle Line.				
11 September	United States	William Cramp & Sons	Philadelphia, Pennsylvania	Barker	Clemson-class destroyer	For United States Navy.				
11 September	United States	Globe Shipbuilding Company	Superior, Wisconsin	Lake Fithian	Design 1074 ship	For United States Shipping Board.				
11 September	United States	G. M. Standifer Construction	Vancouver, Washington	Olockson	Design 1015 ship	For United States Shipping Board.				
11 September	United States	Newport News Shipbuilding	Newport News, Virginia	Ramapo	Design 1106 ship	For United States Shipping Board.				
11 September	United States	Philadelphia Navy Yard	Philadelphia, Pennsylvania	Willet	Lapwing-class minesweeper	For United States Navy.				
12 September	United States	Seattle North Pacific Shipbuilding Company	Seattle, Washington	Chepadoa	Design 1015 ship	For United States Shipping Board.				
12 September	United States	Great Lakes Engineering Works	Ecorse, Michigan	Lake Ellsworth	Design 1074 ship	For United States Shipping Board.				
13 September	United States	Federal Shipbuilding	Kearny, New Jersey	Bellemina	Design 1037 ship	For United States Shipping Board.				
13 September	United States	Federal Shipbuilding	Kearny, New Jersey	Bellhaven	Design 1037 ship	For United States Shipping Board.				
13 September	United States	Submarine Boat Corporation	Newark, New Jersey	Coquitt	Design 1023 ship	For United States Shipping Board.				
13 September	United States	Long Beach Shipbuilding Company	Long Beach, California	Haleakala	Design 1019 ship	For United States Shipping Board.				
13 September	United States	Submarine Boat Corporation	Newark, New Jersey	Moose Hausic	Design 1023 ship	For United States Shipping Board.				
14 September	United States	McDougall-Duluth Shipbuilding Company	Duluth, Minnesota	Chaparel	Design 1020 ship	For United States Shipping Board.				
15 September	United States	Great Lakes Engineering Works	Ashtabula, Ohio	Lake Elpueblo	Design 1074 ship	For United States Shipping Board.				
16 September	United States	Columbia River Shipbuilding	Portland, Oregon	Silets	Design 1013 ship	For United States Shipping Board.				
17 September	United States	American Shipbuilding Company	Lorain, Ohio	Ashland County	Design 1099 ship	For United States Shipping Board.				
18 September	United States	Submarine Boat Corporation	Newark, New Jersey	Independent Bridge	Design 1023 ship	For United States Shipping Board.				
18 September	United States	American International Shipbuilding	Hog Island, Pennsylvania	Inspector	Design 1022 ship	For United States Shipping Board.				
18 September	United States	Ferguson Steel & Iron	Buffalo, New York	Umpqua	Bagaduce-class tug	For United States Navy.				
19 September	United States	Mobile Shipbuilding Company	Mobile, Alabama	Minooka	Design 1038 ship	For United States Shipping Board.				
19 September	United States	Union Iron Works	San Francisco, California	Robert Smith	Clemson-class destroyer	For United States Navy.				
20 September	United States	Baltimore Dry Dock and Shipbuilding Company	Baltimore, Maryland	Bethelridge	Design 1059 ship	For United States Shipping Board.				
20 September	United States	Bethlehem Sparrows Point	Sparrows Point, Maryland	Gosport	Design 1046 ship	For United States Shipping Board.				
20 September	United States	Submarine Boat Corporation	Newark, New Jersey	Lackawanna Bridge	Design 1023 ship	For United States Shipping Board.				
20 September	United States	Pusey & Jones	Wilmington, Delaware	Long Island	Cargo ship	Requisitioned by the United States Shipping Board.				
20 September	United States	Groton Iron Works	Groton, Connecticut	Merry Mount	Design 1016 ship	For United States Shipping Board.				
20 September	United States	New York Shipbuilding	Camden, New Jersey	Scottsbury	Design 1103 ship	For United States Shipping Board.				
21 September	United States	Squantum Victory Yard	Quincy, Massachusetts	Case	Clemson-class destroyer	For United States Navy.				
22 September	United States	Merchant Shipbuilding Corporation	Harriman, Pennsylvania	Auditor	Design 1025 ship	For United States Shipping Board.				
22 September	United States	Submarine Boat Corporation	Newark, New Jersey	Cook	Design 1023 ship	For United States Shipping Board.				
22 September	United States	Skinner & Eddy	Seattle, Washington	Crisfield	Design 1105 ship	For United States Shipping Board.				
22 September	United States	American International Shipbuilding	Hog Island, Pennsylvania	Magmeric	Design 1022 ship	For United States Shipping Board.				
24 September	United States	Merchant Shipbuilding Corporation	Harriman, Pennsylvania	Bensalem	Design 1025 ship	For United States Shipping Board.				
24 September	United States	Submarine Boat Corporation	Newark, New Jersey	Kootenai	Design 1023 ship	For United States Shipping Board.				
24 September	United States	Great Lakes Engineering Works	Ecorse, Michigan	Lake Ellsbury	Design 1074 ship	For United States Shipping Board.				
24 September	United States	Manitowoc Shipbuilding Company	Manitowoc, Wisconsin	Lake Galien	Design 1074 ship	For United States Shipping Board.				
24 September	United States	Chester Shipbuilding Corporation	Chester, Pennsylvania	Lansdowne	Cargo ship	Requisitioned by the United States Shipping Board.				
24 September	United States	New York Shipbuilding	Camden, New Jersey	Santa Elisa	Troopship	Requisitioned by the United States Shipping Board.				
25 September	United States	Alameda Works Shipyard	Alameda, California	Cathwood	Design 1047 ship	For United States Shipping Board.				
25 September	United Kingdom	Harland & Wolff	Belfast	Glenluce	Cargo ship	For Glen Line.				
25 September	United States	Submarine Boat Corporation	Newark, New Jersey	Kenwood Bridge	Design 1023 ship	For United States Shipping Board.				
25 September	United States	Pensacola Shipbuilding Company	Pensacola, Florida	Rockport	Design 1025 ship	For United States Shipping Board.				
26 September	United States	American International Shipbuilding	Hog Island, Pennsylvania	Clavarack	Design 1022 ship	For United States Shipping Board.				
27 September	United States	Bethlehem Wilmington	Wilmington, Delaware	Bethnor	Design 1094 ship	For United States Shipping Board.				
27 September	United States	Ames Shipbuilding and Dry Dock Company	Seattle, Washington	Cathlamet	Design 1080 ship	For United States Shipping Board.				
27 September	United States	Skinner & Eddy	Seattle, Washington	Cripple Creek	Design 1105 ship	For United States Shipping Board.				
27 September	United States	J. F. Duthie & Company	Seattle, Washington	Deuel	Design 1013 ship	For United States Shipping Board.				
27 September	United States	Union Construction Company	Oakland, California	Haxtum	Design 1015 ship	For United States Shipping Board.				
27 September	United States	Todd Dry Dock and Construction Company	Tacoma, Washington	Higho	Design 1014 ship	For United States Shipping Board.				
27 September	United States	Toledo Shipbuilding Company	Toledo, Ohio	Lake Fighting	Design 1099 ship	For United States Shipping Board.				
28 September	United States	Southwestern Shipbuilding Company	San Pedro, California	West Niger	Design 1019 ship	For United States Shipping Board.				
29 September	United States	Union Iron Works	San Francisco, California	Chauncer	Clemson-class destroyer	For United States Navy.				
29 September	United States	Squantum Victory Yard	Quincy, Massachusetts	Lardner	Clemson-class destroyer	For United States Navy.				
30 September	United States	American International Shipbuilding	Hog Island, Pennsylvania	Afoundria	Design 1022 ship	For United States Shipping Board.				
30 September	United States	McDougall-Duluth Shipbuilding Company	Duluth, Minnesota	Fargo	Design 1099 ship	For United States Shipping Board.				
30 September	United States	Submarine Boat Corporation	Newark, New Jersey	Hamlin	Design 1023 ship	For United States Shipping Board.				
30 September	United States	Great Lakes Engineering Works	Ecorse, Michigan	Lake Elmhurst	Design 1074 ship	For United States Shipping Board.				
30 September	United Kingdom	Lithgows Ltd.	Port Glasgow	Nile	Cargo ship	For Nile Steamship Co. Ltd.				
30 September	United States	Squantum Victory Yard	Quincy, Massachusetts	Putnam	Clemson-class destroyer	For United States Navy.				
30 September	United States	Northwest Steel	Portland, Oregon	West Jaffrey	Design 1013 ship	For United States Shipping Board.				

== October ==
Date	Ship	Class	Builder	Location	Country	Notes	Great Lakes Engineering Works	Ecorse, Michigan	2 October	United States
Lake Elmsdale	Design 1074 ship	For United States Shipping Board.								
4 October	United States	Pusey & Jones	Gloucester City, New Jersey	Andrew Jackson	Cargo ship	Requisitioned by the United States Shipping Board.				
4 October	United States	William Cramp & Sons	Philadelphia, Pennsylvania	Borie	Clemson-class destroyer	For United States Navy.				
4 October	United States	New York Shipbuilding	Camden, New Jersey	Reuben James	Clemson-class destroyer	For United States Navy.				
4 October	United States	McDougall-Duluth Shipbuilding Company	Duluth, Minnesota	Sioux Falls	Design 1099 ship	For United States Shipping Board.				
4 October	United States	Sun Shipbuilding Company	Chester, Pennsylvania	Sunshine	Tanker	Requisitioned by the United States Shipping Board.				
6 October	United States	American International Shipbuilding	Hog Island, Pennsylvania	City of Alton	Design 1022 ship	For United States Shipping Board.				
7 October	United States	Skinner & Eddy	Seattle, Washington	Effingham	Design 1105 ship	For United States Shipping Board.				
7 October	United States	American Shipbuilding Company	Wyandotte, Michigan	Lake Fairport	Design 1099 ship	For United States Shipping Board.				
8 October	United States	American International Shipbuilding	Hog Island, Pennsylvania	Coahoma County	Design 1022 ship	For United States Shipping Board.				
9 October	United States	Globe Shipbuilding Company	Superior, Wisconsin	Lake Flag	Design 1074 ship	For United States Shipping Board.				
10 October	United States	Fore River Shipyard	Quincy, Massachusetts	R-14	R-class submarine	For United States Navy.				
11 October	United States	New York Shipbuilding	Camden, New Jersey	American Legion	Design 1029 ship	For United States Shipping Board.				
11 October	United States	Texas Steamship Corporation|	Bath, Maine	Aryan	Tanker	Requisitioned by the United States Shipping Board.				
11 October	United States	Federal Shipbuilding	Kearny, New Jersey	Bellepline	Design 1037 ship	For United States Shipping Board.				
11 October	United States	Federal Shipbuilding	Kearny, New Jersey	Bellerose	Design 1037 ship	For United States Shipping Board.				
11 October	United States	American International Shipbuilding	Hog Island, Pennsylvania	Casey	Design 1022 ship	For United States Shipping Board.				
11 October	United States	Skinner & Eddy	Seattle, Washington	Effna	Design 1105 ship	For United States Shipping Board.				
11 October	United States	McDougall-Duluth Shipbuilding Company	Duluth, Minnesota	Great Falls	Design 1099 ship	For United States Shipping Board.				
11 October	United States	Toledo Shipbuilding Company	Toledo, Ohio	Lake Filbert	Design 1099 ship	For United States Shipping Board.				
11 October	United States	Northwest Engineering Works	Green Bay, Wisconsin	Pylos	Design 1035 tug	For United States Shipping Board.				
11 October	United Kingdom	Harland & Wolff	Belfast	War Passion	N-type cargo ship	For Elder Dempster.				
11 October	United States	Saginaw Shipbuilding Company	Saginaw, Michigan	Unnamed	Design 1074 ship	For United States Shipping Board.				
15 October	United States	Squantum Victory Yard	Quincy, Massachusetts	Reid	Clemson-class destroyer	For United States Navy.				
16 October	United States	Submarine Boat Corporation	Newark, New Jersey	Indiana Bridge	Design 1023 ship	For United States Shipping Board.				
16 October	United States	New York Shipbuilding	Camden, New Jersey	Williamson	Clemson-class destroyer	For United States Navy.				
17 October	United States	Submarine Boat Corporation	Newark, New Jersey	Cushnet	Design 1023 ship	For United States Shipping Board.				
17 October	United States	Great Lakes Engineering Works	Ashtabula, Ohio	Lake Elrio	Design 1074 ship	For United States Shipping Board.				
18 October	United States	American International Shipbuilding	Hog Island, Pennsylvania	Coldbrook	Design 1022 ship	For United States Shipping Board.				
18 October	United States	Submarine Boat Corporation	Newark, New Jersey	Coskata	Design 1023 ship	For United States Shipping Board.				
18 October	United States	American Shipbuilding Company	Lorain, Ohio	Henry County	Design 1099 ship	For United States Shipping Board.				
18 October	United States	William Cramp & Sons	Philadelphia, Pennsylvania	John D. Edwards	Clemson-class destroyer	For United States Navy.				
18 October	United States	Saginaw Shipbuilding Company	Saginaw, Michigan	Unnamed	Design 1074 ship	For United States Shipping Board.				
19 October	United States	Newburgh Shipyards	Newburgh, New York	Monroe	Design 1025 ship	For United States Shipping Board.				
20 October	United States	Submarine Boat Corporation	Newark, New Jersey	Cuttyhunk	Design 1023 ship	For United States Shipping Board.				
21 October	United States	Fore River Shipyard	Quincy, Massachusetts	Hadnot	Design 1045 ship	For United States Shipping Board.				
21 October	United States	Ferguson Steel & Iron	Buffalo, New York	Wandank	Bagaduce-class tug	For United States Navy.				
23 October	United Kingdom	Harland & Wolff	Belfast	Boma	B-type cargo ship	For Elder Dempster.				
23 October	United Kingdom	Harland & Wolff	Belfast	Dundrum Castle	B-type cargo ship	For Union-Castle Line.				
23 October	United States	McDougall-Duluth Shipbuilding Company	Duluth, Minnesota	Lake Floravista	Design 1099 ship	For United States Shipping Board.				
23 October	United States	Oscar Daniels Company	Tampa, Florida	Unicoi	Design 1027 ship	For United States Shipping Board.				
24 October	United States	Squantum Victory Yard	Quincy, Massachusetts	Worden	Clemson-class destroyer	For United States Navy.				
25 October	United States	Seattle North Pacific Shipbuilding Company	Seattle, Washington	Chicomico	Design 1015 ship	For United States Shipping Board.				
25 October	United Kingdom	Amble Ferro-Concrete Co. Ltd.	Amble	Cretestem	Concrete tug	For The Shipping Controller.				
25 October	United States	Alexandria, VirginiaVirginia Shipbuilding Corporation		E. A. Morse	Design 1015 ship	For United States Shipping Board.				
25 October	United States	Skinner & Eddy	Seattle, Washington	Eglantine	Design 1105 ship	For United States Shipping Board.				
25 October	United States	Newport News Shipbuilding	Newport News, Virginia	Rapidan	Design 1106 ship	For United States Shipping Board.				
25 October	Japan	Mitsubishi Heavy Industries	Kobe	Ro-51	Type L1 submarine	For Imperial Japanese Navy.				
25 October	United States	American International Shipbuilding	Hog Island, Pennsylvania	Sundance	Design 1022 ship	For United States Shipping Board.				
25 October	United States	Ames Shipbuilding and Dry Dock Company	Seattle, Washington	West Ivis	Design 1080 ship	For United States Shipping Board.				
27 October	United States	American International Shipbuilding	Hog Island, Pennsylvania	Cantigny	Design 1024 ship	For United States Shipping Board.				
27 October	United States	Merchant Shipbuilding Corporation	Harriman, Pennsylvania	Lycoming	Design 1025 ship	For United States Shipping Board.				
28 October	United States	Chester Shipbuilding Corporation	Chester, Pennsylvania	John Roach	Cargo ship	Requisitioned by the United States Shipping Board.				
28 October	United States	Submarine Boat Corporation	Newark, New Jersey	Margus	Design 1023 ship	For United States Shipping Board.				
28 October	United States	Atlantic Corporation	Portsmouth, New Hampshire	Nipmuc	Design 1019 ship	For United States Shipping Board.				
28 October	United States	New York Shipbuilding	Camden, New Jersey	Sands	Clemson-class destroyer	For United States Navy.				
29 October	United States	Submarine Boat Corporation	Newark, New Jersey	Northwestern Bridge	Design 1023 ship	For United States Shipping Board.				
31 October	United States	Submarine Boat Corporation	Newark, New Jersey	Lakeside Bridge	Design 1023 ship	For United States Shipping Board.				
30 October	United States	Submarine Boat Corporation	Newark, New Jersey	Massilon Bridge	Design 1023 ship	For United States Shipping Board.				

== November ==
Date	Ship	Class	Builder	Location	Country	Notes	Federal Shipbuilding	Kearny, New JerseyFederal Shipbuilding	1 November	United States
Bellflower	Design 1037 ship	For United States Shipping Board.								
1 November	United States	Baltimore Dry Dock and Shipbuilding Company	Baltimore, Maryland	Danville	Design 1058 ship	For United States Shipping Board.				
1 November	United States	Skinner & Eddy	Seattle, Washington	Egremont	Design 1079 ship	For United States Shipping Board.				
1 November	United States	Toledo Shipbuilding Company	Toledo, Ohio	Lake Fillion	Design 1099 ship	For United States Shipping Board.				
1 November	United States	Groton Iron Works	Groton, Connecticut	Quinnipiack	Design 1016 ship	For United States Shipping Board.				
3 November	United States	Great Lakes Engineering Works	Ashtabula, Ohio	Lake Elsmere	Design 1074 ship	For United States Shipping Board.				
4 November	Empire of Japan	Asano Shipbuilding Company	Tsurumi-ku, Yokohama	Eastern Trader	Cargo ship	For United States Shipping Board.				
5 November	United States	Manitowoc Shipbuilding Company	Manitowoc, Wisconsin	Lake Ikatan	Design 1074 ship	For United States Shipping Board.				
5 November	United States	Submarine Boat Corporation	Newark, New Jersey	Massick	Design 1023 ship	For United States Shipping Board.				
5 November	United States	American International Shipbuilding	Hog Island, Pennsylvania	Wildwood	Design 1022 ship	For United States Shipping Board.				
5 November	Empire of Japan	Uchida		Eastern Glade	Cargo ship	For United States Shipping Board.				
6 November	United States	Fore River Shipyard	Quincy, Massachusetts	Hagan	Design 1045 ship	For United States Shipping Board.				
6 November	United Kingdom	Harland & Wolff	Belfast	New Brighton	N-type cargo ship	For African Steamship Co.				
6 November	United States	Pusey & Jones	Wilmington, Delaware	Staten Island	Cargo ship	Requisitioned by the United States Shipping Board.				
6 November	United States	William Cramp & Sons	Philadelphia, Pennsylvania	Whipple	Clemson-class destroyer	For United States Navy.				
6 November	Empire of Japan	Kawasaki		Eastern Moon	Cargo ship	For United States Shipping Board.				
7 November	United States	Federal Shipbuilding	Kearny, New Jersey	Bellbuckle	Design 1037 ship	For United States Shipping Board.				
7 November	United States	Squantum Victory Yard	Quincy, Massachusetts	Flusser	Clemson-class destroyer	For United States Navy.				
7 November	United States	Mobile Shipbuilding Company	Mobile, Alabama	Hutchinson	Design 1038 ship	For United States Shipping Board.				
8 November	United States	Terry Shipbuilding	Savannah, Georgia	Darden	Design 1031 ship	For United States Shipping Board.				
8 November	United States	American Shipbuilding Company	Lorain, Ohio	Franklin County	Design 1099 ship	For United States Shipping Board.				
8 November	United States	American Shipbuilding Company	Wyandotte, Michigan	Detroit Wayne	Design 1099 ship	For United States Shipping Board.				
10 November	United States	Merchant Shipbuilding Corporation	Harriman, Pennsylvania	Bavington	Design 1025 ship	For United States Shipping Board.				
10 November	United States	Portsmouth Navy Yard	Portsmouth, New Hampshire	S-5	S-class submarine	For United States Navy.				
11 November	United States	McDougall-Duluth Shipbuilding Company	Duluth, Minnesota	Lake Florian	Design 1099 ship	For United States Shipping Board.				
12 November	United States	American International Shipbuilding	Hog Island, Pennsylvania	Cliffwood	Design 1022 ship	For United States Shipping Board.				
14 November	United States	Submarine Boat Corporation	Newark, New Jersey	Mopang	Design 1023 ship	For United States Shipping Board.				
15 November	United States	Carolina Shipbuilding Corporation	Wilmington, North Carolina	City of Omaha	Design 1037 ship	For United States Shipping Board.				
15 November	United States	American Shipbuilding Company	Chicago, Illinois	Geyser	Design 1099 ship	For United States Shipping Board.				
15 November	United States	American Shipbuilding Company	Chicago, Illinois	Giddings	Design 1099 ship	For United States Shipping Board.				
15 November	United States	Bethlehem Sparrows Point	Sparrows Point, Maryland	Hagood	Design 1047 ship	For United States Shipping Board.				
15 November	United States	Skinner & Eddy	Seattle, Washington	Jadden	Design 1079 ship	For United States Shipping Board.				
15 November	United States	Federal Shipbuilding	Kearny, New Jersey	Kearny	Design 1037 ship	For United States Shipping Board.				
15 November	United States	Great Lakes Engineering Works	Ecorse, Michigan	Lake Elmont	Design 1074 ship	For United States Shipping Board.				
15 November	United States	Great Lakes Engineering Works	Ashtabula, Ohio	Lake Elsah	Design 1074 ship	For United States Shipping Board.				
15 November	United States	Great Lakes Engineering Works	Ashtabula, Ohio	Lake Elva	Design 1074 ship	For United States Shipping Board.				
15 November	United States	American Shipbuilding Company	Lorain, Ohio	Lake Fenn	Design 1099 ship	For United States Shipping Board.				
15 November	United States	McDougall-Duluth Shipbuilding Company	Duluth, Minnesota	Lake Floris	Design 1099 ship	For United States Shipping Board.				
15 November	United States	Globe Shipbuilding Company	Superior, Wisconsin	Lake Glaucus	Design 1074 ship	For United States Shipping Board.				
15 November	United States	G. M. Standifer Construction	Vancouver, Washington	Montague	Design 1015 ship	For United States Shipping Board.				
15 November	United States	Standard Shipbuilding Corporation	Shooters Island, New York	Tenafly	Design 1063 ship	For United States Shipping Board.				
15 November	United States	Columbia River Shipbuilding	Portland, Oregon	West Hassavampa	Design 1013 ship	For United States Shipping Board.				
15 November	United States	Ames Shipbuilding and Dry Dock Company	Seattle, Washington	West Jana	Design 1080 ship	For United States Shipping Board.				
17 November	United States	Northwest Steel	Portland, Oregon	Centaurus	Design 1013 ship	For Green Star Line.				
17 November	United States	Skinner & Eddy	Seattle, Washington	Nile	Design 1079 ship	For United States Shipping Board.				
18 November	United States	American International Shipbuilding	Hog Island, Pennsylvania	Argonne	Design 1024 ship	For United States Shipping Board.				
19 November	United States	Squantum Victory Yard	Quincy, Massachusetts	Dale	Clemson-class destroyer	For United States Navy.				
20 November	United States	Mare Island Navy Yard	Vallejo, California	California	Tennessee-class battleship	For United States Navy.				
22 November	United States	Skinner & Eddy	Seattle, Washington	Crosskeys	Design 1079 ship	For United States Shipping Board.				
22 November	United States	Groton Iron Works	Groton, Connecticut	Hartford	Design 1016 ship	For United States Shipping Board.				
22 November	United States	Great Lakes Engineering Works	Ecorse, Michigan	Lake Slavi	Design 1074 ship	For United States Shipping Board.				
22 November	United States	Seattle North Pacific Shipbuilding Company	Seattle, Washington	Manham	Design 1015 ship	For United States Shipping Board.				
22 November	Japan	Kawasaki Heavy Industries	Kobe	Ro-2	Type F1 submarine	For Imperial Japanese Navy				
22 November	United Kingdom	Harland & Wolff	Belfast	SS War Airman	AO tanker	For British Shipping Controller.				
22 November	United States	J. F. Duthie & Company	Seattle, Washington	West Hesseltine	Design 1013 ship	For United States Shipping Board.				
24 November	United States	Pusey & Jones	Gloucester City, New Jersey	John Adams	Cargo ship	Requisitioned by the United States Shipping Board.				
24 November	United States	Submarine Boat Corporation	Newark, New Jersey	Minnewawa	Design 1023 ship	For United States Shipping Board.				
26 November	United States	Merchant Shipbuilding Corporation	Harriman, Pennsylvania	Kayseeka	Design 1025 ship	For United States Shipping Board.				
27 November	United States	American Shipbuilding Company	Wyandotte, Michigan	Lake Vinton County	Design 1099 ship	For United States Shipping Board.				
27 November	United States	Submarine Boat Corporation	Newark, New Jersey	Rock Island Bridge	Design 1023 ship	For United States Shipping Board.				
27 November	United Kingdom	Harland & Wolff	Belfast	War Riddle	N-type cargo ship	For Atlantic Transport Co.				
28 November	United States	Squantum Victory Yard	Quincy, Massachusetts	Converse	Clemson-class destroyer	For United States Navy.				
30 November	United States	Pensacola Shipbuilding Company	Pensacola, Florida	City of Sherman	Design 1025 ship	For United States Shipping Board.				
30 November	United States	American Shipbuilding Company	Wyandotte, Michigan	Lake Hancock County	Design 1099 ship	For United States Shipping Board.				
30 November	United States	Mobile Shipbuilding Company	Mobile, Alabama	Oklahoma City	Design 1038 ship	For United States Shipping Board.				
30 November	United States	Manitowoc Shipbuilding Company	Manitowoc, Wisconsin	Wauwatosa	Design 1074 ship	For United States Shipping Board.				
November	United Kingdom	Blyth Shipbuilding & Dry Docks Co. Ltd	Blyth	Notton	Cargo ship	For Atlantic Shipping & Trading Co. Ltd.				

== December ==
Date	Ship	Class	Builder	Location	Country	Notes	Globe Shipbuilding Company	Superior, Wisconsin	1 December	United States
Lake Glaucus	Design 1074 ship	For United States Shipping Board.								
1 December	United States	Submarine Boat Corporation	Newark, New Jersey	Monomac	Design 1023 ship	For United States Shipping Board.				
1 December	United States	Saginaw Shipbuilding Company	Saginaw, Michigan	Name unknown	Design 1074 ship	For United States Shipping Board.				
2 December	United States	Manitowoc Shipbuilding Company	Manitowoc, Wisconsin	Lake Galva	Design 1074 ship	For United States Shipping Board.				
3 December	United States	Merchant Shipbuilding Corporation	Harriman, Pennsylvania	Mitchell	Design 1025 ship	For United States Shipping Board.				
4 December	United States	Standard Shipbuilding Corporation	Shooters Island, New York	Kerhonkson	Design 1063 ship	For United States Shipping Board.				
5 December	United States	Oscar Daniels Company	Tampa, Florida	Manatee	Design 1027 ship	For United States Shipping Board.				
6 December	United States	American International Shipbuilding	Hog Island, Pennsylvania	Cambrai	Design 1024 ship	For United States Shipping Board.				
6 December	United States	Great Lakes Engineering Works	Ecorse, Michigan	Lake Elmsford	Design 1074 ship	For United States Shipping Board.				
8 December	United States	Submarine Boat Corporation	Newark, New Jersey	Pittsburgh Bridge	Design 1023 ship	For United States Shipping Board.				
8 December	Japan	Sasebo Naval Arsenal	Sasebo	Ro-24	Kaichu III-type submarine	For Imperial Japanese Navy.				
9 December	United States	Submarine Boat Corporation	Newark, New Jersey	Toledo Bridge	Design 1023 ship	For United States Shipping Board.				
9 December	United States	Submarine Boat Corporation	Newark, New Jersey	Vincennes Bridge	Design 1023 ship	For United States Shipping Board.				
9 December	United States	Submarine Boat Corporation	Newark, New Jersey	Virginia Bridge	Design 1023 ship	For United States Shipping Board.				
10 December	United States	Vancouver, Washington	G. M. Standifer Construction	Abercos	Design 1015 ship	For United States Shipping Board.				
10 December	United States	Squantum Victory Yard	Quincy, Massachusetts	Billingley	Clemson-class destroyer	For United States Navy.				
10 December	United States	Sun Shipbuilding Company	Chester, Pennsylvania	Chester Valley	Design 1018 ship	For United States Shipping Board.				
10 December	United States	Bethlehem Wilmington	Wilmington, Delaware	Macomet	Design 1094 ship	For United States Shipping Board.				
10 December	United States	Fore River Shipyard	Quincy, Massachusetts	Trimountain	Design 1045 ship	For United States Shipping Board.				
11 December	United Kingdom	Harland & Wolff	Belfast	War Romance	N-type cargo ship	For Elder Dempster.				
15 December	United States	Terry Shipbuilding	Savannah, Georgia	Dartford	Design 1031 ship	For United States Shipping Board.				
15 December	United States	Chester Shipbuilding Corporation	Chester, Pennsylvania	Amcross	Cargo ship	Requisitioned by the United States Shipping Board.				
15 December	United States	Standard Shipbuilding Corporation	Shooters Island, New York	Hinkley	Design 1063 ship	For United States Shipping Board.				
15 December	United States	Great Lakes Engineering Works	Ecorse, Michigan	Lake Elmwood	Design 1074 ship	For United States Shipping Board.				
15 December	United States	Toledo Shipbuilding Company	Toledo, Ohio	Lake Fillmore	Design 1099 ship	For United States Shipping Board.				
18 December	United States	Squantum Victory Yard	Quincy, Massachusetts	Charles Ausburn	Clemson-class destroyer	For United States Navy.				
18 December	United States	William Cramp & Sons	Philadelphia, Pennsylvania	MacLeish	Clemson-class destroyer	For United States Navy.				
19 December	United States	New York Shipbuilding	Camden, New Jersey	Santa Leonora	Troopship	Requisitioned by the United States Shipping Board.				
20 December	United States	Bethlehem Wilmington	Wilmington, Delaware	Liberty Minquas	Design 1031 ship	For United States Shipping Board.				
20 December	United States	Manitowoc Shipbuilding Company	Manitowoc, Wisconsin	Ripon	Design 1074 ship	For United States Shipping Board.				
20 December	United States	Western Pipe & Steel	South San Francisco, California	West Calera	Design 1019 ship	For United States Shipping Board.				
20 December	United States	J. F. Duthie & Company	Seattle, Washington	West Ivan	Design 1013 ship	For United States Shipping Board.				
20 December	United States	Moore Shipbuilding Company	Oakland, California	Salina	Design 1041 ship	For United States Shipping Board.				
20 December	United States	Moore Shipbuilding Company	Oakland, California	City of Reno	Design 1041 ship	For United States Shipping Board.				
20 December	United States	Moore Shipbuilding Company	Oakland, California	Sapulpa	Design 1041 ship	For United States Shipping Board.				
20 December	United States	Moore Shipbuilding Company	Oakland, California	Jalapa	Design 1015 ship	For United States Shipping Board.				
20 December	United States	Moore Shipbuilding Company	Oakland, California	Mosella	Design 1015 ship	For United States Shipping Board.				
20 December	United States	Moore Shipbuilding Company	Oakland, California	Janelew	Design 1015 ship	For United States Shipping Board.				
23 December	United Kingdom	William Beardmore & Co. Ltd.	Port Glasgow	Cameronia	Ocean liner	For Anchor Line				
23 December	United States	Portsmouth Navy Yard	Portsmouth, New Hampshire	S-6	S-class submarine	For United States Navy.				
24 December	United States	Submarine Boat Corporation	Newark, New Jersey	East Chicago	Design 1023 ship	For United States Shipping Board.				
24 December	United States	Atlantic Corporation	Portsmouth, New Hampshire	Norumbega	Design 1019 ship	For United States Shipping Board.				
24 December	United States	Newport News Shipbuilding	Newport News, Virginia	Sapelo	Patoka-class oiler	For				
25 December	United Kingdom	Harland & Wolff	Belfast	Glentara	Cargo ship	For Glen Line.				
25 December	United States	Bethlehem Wilmington	Wilmington, Delaware	Kehuku	Design 1031 ship	For United States Shipping Board.				
27 December	United States	American International Shipbuilding	Hog Island, Pennsylvania	City of Flint	Design 1022 cargo ship	For				
27 December	United States	Seattle North Pacific Shipbuilding Company	Seattle, Washington	Maquan	Design 1015 ship	For United States Shipping Board.				
27 December	United Kingdom	Harland & Wolff	Belfast	Somerset Coast	Coaster	For Coast Lines.				
29 December	United States	Squantum Victory Yard	Quincy, Massachusetts	Osborne	Clemson-class destroyer	For United States Navy.				
31 December	United States	Merill-Stevens Shipbuilding Corporation	Jacksonville, Florida	Pinellas	Design 1012 ship	For United States Shipping Board.				
31 December	United States	Pensacola Shipbuilding Company	Pensacola, Florida	City of Vernon	Design 1025 ship	For United States Shipping Board.				

== Unknown date ==
Country	Builder	Location	Ship	Class	Notes	Mobile, Alabama	Alta	United States	Alabama Drydock and Shipbuilding Company
Steamship	For United States Shipping Board.								
United Kingdom	Dublin Dockyard Co. Ltd.	Dublin	Bermondsey	Cargo ship	For private owner.				
United States	Alabama Drydock and Shipbuilding Company	Mobile, Alabama	Bittern	Lapwing-class minesweeper	For United States Navy.				
United Kingdom	J. W. Brooke & Co. Ltd.	Lowestoft	Blue Haze	Drifter	For Viking Steam Fishing Co. Ltd.				
United Kingdom	J. W. Brooke & Co. Ltd.	Lowestoft	Bow Wave	Drifter	For Viking Steam Fishing Co. Ltd.				
United Kingdom	J. W. Brooke & Co. Ltd.	Lowestoft	Breaker	Naval drifter	For Royal Navy, but completed as commercial drifter Kathleen for Head & Wright Ltd.				
United Kingdom	J. W. Brooke & Co. Ltd.	Lowestoft	Broil	Naval drifter	For Royal Navy, but completed as commercial drifter.				
United Kingdom	J. W. Brooke & Co. Ltd.	Lowestoft	Bubble	Naval drifter	For Royal Navy, but completed as commercial drifter.				
Germany	Howaldtswerke	Kiel	Gedania	Tanker	For Wareid Tankschiff GmbH.				
United Kingdom	J. W. Brooke & Co. Ltd.	Lowestoft	Grey Sea	Naval drifter	For Royal Navy.				
United Kingdom	J. W. Brooke & Co. Ltd.	Lowestoft	Low Tide	Naval drifter	For Royal Navy, but completed as a commercial fishing vessel.				
United Kingdom	J. W. Brooke & Co. Ltd.	Lowestoft	May Bird	Naval drifter	Intended as Blare for Royal Navy, completed as commercial drifter for Edward Y. Wheatley.				
United Kingdom	James Pollock & Sons	Faversham	Moliette	Ferro-Concrete coaster	For unknown owner.	Queensferry	Robert Farecloth	United Kingdom	I. J. Abdela & Mitchell Ltd.
Naval trawler	For Royal Navy.								
United Kingdom			St. Minver	Saint-class tug	For Royal Navy.				
United States	Alabama Drydock and Shipbuilding Company	Mobile, Alabama	Swan	Lapwing-class minesweeper	For United States Navy.				
United Kingdom	James Pollock & Sons	Faversham	Violette	Ferro-Concrete coaster	For unknown owner.	Port Glasgow	War Celt	United Kingdom	William Hamilton & Co. Ltd.
Cargo ship	For British Shipping Controller.								
United States	Alabama Drydock and Shipbuilding Company	Mobile, Alabama	Whippoorwill	Lapwing-class minesweeper	For United States Navy.				
