= SS Dora =

A number of steamships have carried the name Dora, including:

- SS Dora (1880), launched in 1880 for use in the coastal trade between California and Alaska
- Dora, original name of SS Douglas (1889), launched in 1889 for use by the London and South Western Railway
- Dora (sternwheeler), a 1910 steamboat in Oregon
- SS Dora, subsequently renamed SS Comol Cuba, a Design 1022 ship launched in 1919 as SS Inspector and converted into a tanker
- SS Dora, initially launched in 1898 as SS Vega, was used by Zionist organizations to transport Jewish refugees from Nazi Germany to Palestine in 1939
