= USS Arethusa (IX-135) =

History

United States
- Launched: 9 January 1921
- Acquired: 23 March 1944
- Commissioned: 23 March 1944
- Decommissioned: 16 May 1946
- Stricken: 5 June 1946
- Fate: Scrapped

General characteristics
- Class & type: Design 1041 tanker

USS Arethusa (IX-135) began life as Gargoyle—a tanker built in 1921 at Oakland, Calif., by the Moore Shipbuilding Co. and was renamed Arethusa by the Navy and designated IX-135 on 3 November 1943; acquired by the Navy on 23 March 1944 from the War Shipping Administration on a bareboat basis for use as a mobile floating storage tanker; and placed in commission on that same day at Majuro Atoll, Marshall Islands.

Arethusa remained at Majuro through early June providing fuel to various ships of the Fleet. She got underway on 8 June and proceeded to Eniwetok, where she resumed her fueling operations. The tanker sailed on 19 August for the Admiralty Islands, reached Manus on 28 August, and once again dispensed fuel to Allied ships. The tanker headed for the Philippines on 12 October to support Fleet units about to begin the reconquest of that archipelago. She reached Leyte Gulf on 20 October and commenced fueling operations.

Arethusa shaped a course back to Manus in early January 1945 and operated there through 5 May, when she got underway for the Western Caroline Islands. The vessel reached Ulithi four days later and resumed fueling services. The ship weighed anchor once again on 22 June and set a course for Kerama Retto in the Ryukyus. She was stationed at Okinawa when the Japanese surrendered in mid-August 1945 and continued operations at that island until mid-December.

Arethusa then moved to Subic Bay, Philippines. She provided fuel to fleet ships at that port through 3 March 1946, when the vessel got underway for home. She reached Pearl Harbor, Hawaii, on 28 March and remained there for a short period of voyage repairs. The ship left Hawaiian waters on 5 April and steamed into San Francisco Bay on 15 April. She was decommissioned at San Francisco on 16 May 1946 and returned to the War Shipping Administration on that same day. Her name was struck from the Navy list on 5 June 1946. The vessel was sold to Kaiser Co., Inc., on 8 December 1947, and was subsequently scrapped.

Arethusa won two battle stars for her World War II service.
