= Design 1031 ship =

US tanker ship design in World War I

Class overview
- Name: EFT Design 1031
- Builders: Bethlehem Wilmington Shipyard; Terry Shipbuilding Company
- Built: 1919–1920
- Planned: 16
- Completed: 11
- Canceled: 5

General characteristics
- Type: Tanker
- Tonnage: 7,500 dwt
- Length: 392 ft 0 in (119.48 m)
- Beam: 51 ft 0 in (15.54 m)
- Draft: 29 ft 0 in (8.84 m)
- Propulsion: Triple expansion engine, oil fuel

The Design 1031 ship (full name Emergency Fleet Corporation Design 1031) was a steel-hulled tanker ship design approved for production by the United States Shipping Board's Emergency Fleet Corporation (EFT) in World War I. A total of 16 ships were ordered; 5 were cancelled and 11 were built from 1919 to 1920. Two shipyards were used in their construction: Bethlehem Wilmington Shipyard of Wilmington, Delaware (6 ships); and Terry Shipbuilding Company of Savannah, Georgia (5 ships).

== Bibliography ==
- McKellar, Norman L. "Steel Shipbuilding under the U. S. Shipping Board, 1917-1921, Part III, Contract Steel Ships" (PDF). Steel Shipbuilding under the U. S. Shipping Board, 1917-1921. ShipScribe.
