= SS Rock Island Bridge =

Coordinates: 50°05′36″N 05°05′32″W

History

United States
- Name: Rock Island Bridge
- Namesake: Rock Island Bridge & Iron Works Co.
- Owner: USSB
- Operator: Roger & Webb (1920)
- Ordered: 16 November 1917
- Builder: Submarine Boat Company, Newark
- Yard number: 92
- Laid down: 31 July 1919
- Launched: 22 November 1919
- Sponsored by: Mrs. Edward Manhard
- Completed: December 1919
- Maiden voyage: 20 February 1920
- In service: 17 January 1920
- Home port: Newark
- Identification: US Official number 219337; Call sign LVBP
- Fate: Wrecked, 22 March 1920

General characteristics
- Class & type: Design 1023 ship
- Tonnage: 3,545 GRT; 2,174 NRT; 5,300 DWT
- Length: 324.0 ft (98.8 m)
- Beam: 46.2 ft (14.1 m)
- Draft: 22 ft 9 1/2 in (6.947 m) (loaded)
- Depth: 25.0 ft (7.6 m)
- Installed power: 1,500 ihp
- Propulsion: Westinghouse Electric steam turbine double reduction geared to one screw
- Speed: 10 1/2 knots (19.4 km/h)

Rock Island Bridge was a steam cargo ship built in 1919 by Submarine Boat Company of Newark for the United States Shipping Board (USSB) as part of the wartime shipbuilding program of the Emergency Fleet Corporation (EFC) to restore the nation's Merchant Marine. In March 1920 while on her maiden voyage the vessel collided with another steamer and subsequently had to be beached to avoid sinking. She was later abandoned and sold for scrap.

== Design and construction ==
After the United States entry into World War I, a large shipbuilding program was undertaken to restore and enhance shipping capabilities both of the United States and their Allies. As part of this program, EFC placed orders with nation's shipyards for a large number of vessels of standard designs. Design 1023 cargo ship was a standard cargo freighter of approximately 5,300 tons deadweight designed by Submarine Boat Corp. and adopted by USSB.

Rock Island Bridge was part of the second optional order for 68 additional vessels placed by USSB with Submarine Boat Corp. on 16 November 1917. The ship was laid down at the shipbuilder's yard on 31 July 1919 (yard number 92) and launched on 22 November 1919, with Mrs. Edward Manhard, wife of the Secretary and General Manager of Rock Island Bridge & Iron Works Co. of Rock Island, being the sponsor. The launching was conducted in the evening and on that occasion the ship was decorated with a variety of multi-color lights. The vessel was named after the company, one of many providers of fabricated steel for the shipyard.

Similar to all vessels of this class the ship had three islands and one main deck, had machinery situated amidships and had four main holds, both fore and aft, which allowed for the carriage of variety of goods and merchandise. The vessel also possessed all the modern machinery for quick loading and unloading of cargo from five large hatches, including ten winches and ten booms. She was also equipped with wireless apparatus and had electrical lights installed along the deck.

As built, the ship was 324.0 feet (98.8 m) long (between perpendiculars) and 46.2 feet (14.1 m) abeam and had a depth of 25.0 feet (7.6 m). Rock Island Bridge was originally assessed at 3,545 GRT and 2,174 NRT and had deadweight of approximately 5,300. The vessel had a steel hull with double bottom throughout and a single turbine rated at 1,500 shp, double reduction geared to a single screw propeller, that moved the ship at up to 10 1/2 knots (12.1 mph; 19.4 km/h). The steam for the engine was supplied by two Babcock & Wilcox Water Tube boilers fitted for oil fuel.

The vessel construction was finalized in December 1919 and the ship proceeded to New York on 13 January 1920 where she was inspected by the USSB representatives and officially accepted by them on 17 January 1920.

== Operational history ==
Upon acceptance by USSB the ship was allocated to Boston-based operators Roger & Webb for service to Low Countries and France. The vessel then proceeded to Portland where she arrived on February 1. After loading her cargo, Rock Island Bridge sailed out on February 20 on her maiden voyage bound for Antwerp and Rotterdam. The journey was uneventful until the vessel nearly reached her destination. On March 5 in thick fog the ship went aground just west of Beachy Head, but was able to free herself without suffering any apparent damage and was instructed to proceed to Antwerp where she arrived next day.

After unloading her cargo the freighter left Antwerp on March 19 in ballast, bound for New York via Falmouth. On March 22 while approximately 8 nautical miles (15 kilometres; 9.2 miles) off Ushant in stormy and foggy weather Rock Island Bridge was rammed amidships by a large fully-laden tanker SS Iroquois who also was towing a barge. The collision did not produce significant amount of damage, with the hull of Rock Island Bridge withstanding the impact only resulting in some plates being stove in. However, in subsequent confusion the tanker pressed on and struck the freighter two more times. As a result, the tanker's bow punched a gaping hole in cargo ship's stern below waterline. Rock Island Bridge quickly filled up, but her fore bulkheads held and the ship was able to stay afloat. A distress signal was sent out and another Shipping Board steamer, SS Kenosha, came to her aid. Rock Island Bridge was taken into tow and taken towards Falmouth. However, the vessel soon developed a list and was beached and sunk in shallow water in the mouth of Helford River off Polkerris Point.

Initially USSB was planning to raise and repair the vessel, however, after some considerations they decided against it. Instead, Rock Island Bridge was offered and sold in May 1920 at auction in 'as-is' condition for £15,250 to All Seas Marine & Salvage Co. with the intention of raising and repairing the ship. At the time of auction the ship value was estimated to be approximately £200,000. The wreck was successfully floated in mid-September 1920 with the use of only air compressors. However, the salvage was complicated by the vessel laying on her side. All attempts to pull her upright using tugs or cables attached to huge concrete blocks were unsuccessful and salvage operations were terminated. The wreck remained in its current place until it was reduced to scrap in situ using explosives in 1927.
