= Design 1012 ship =

Steel-hulled cargo ship design

Class overview
- Name: EFC Design 1012
- Builders: Merrill-Stevens Drydock & Repair Company
- Built: 1919–20 (USSB)
- Planned: 21
- Completed: 4
- Canceled: 17

General characteristics
- Type: Cargo ship
- Tonnage: 6,000 dwt
- Length: 333 ft 0 in (101.50 m)
- Beam: 49 ft 0 in (14.94 m)
- Draft: 25 ft 0 in (7.62 m)
- Propulsion: Turbine, oil fuel

The Design 1012 ship (full name Emergency Fleet Corporation Design 1012) was a steel-hulled cargo ship design approved for production by the United States Shipping Board's Emergency Fleet Corporation (EFC) in World War I. They were referred to as the "Munrio"-type which was the name of the SS Munrio, a similar pre-EFC ship built at the Bethlehem Sparrows Point Shipyard.

== Bibliography ==
- McKellar, Norman L. "Steel Shipbuilding under the U. S. Shipping Board, 1917-1921, Part I, Contract Steel Ships" (PDF). Steel Shipbuilding under the U. S. Shipping Board, 1917-1921. ShipScribe.
