= Design 1038 ship =

Standard ship types of the US

Class overview
- Name: EFC Design 1038
- Builders: Mobile Shipbuilding Company
- Built: 1919–1920
- Planned: 16
- Completed: 8

General characteristics
- Tonnage: 5,210 dwt
- Length: 324 ft 0 in (98.76 m)
- Beam: 46 ft 0 in (14.02 m)
- Draft: 25 ft 0 in (7.62 m)
- Installed power: oil fuel
- Propulsion: Triple expansion engine

The Design 1038 ship (full name Emergency Fleet Corporation Design 1038) was a steel-hulled cargo ship design approved for production by the United States Shipping Board's Emergency Fleet Corporation (EFC) in World War I. A total of 16 ships were ordered of which 8 were cancelled and 8 completed from 1919 to 1920. The ships were constructed at the Mobile, Alabama shipyard of the Mobile Shipbuilding Company.

== Bibliography ==
- McKellar, Norman L. "Steel Shipbuilding under the U. S. Shipping Board, 1917-1921, Part IV, Contract Steel Ships" (PDF). Steel Shipbuilding under the U. S. Shipping Board, 1917-1921. ShipScribe.
