= Design 1017 ship =

World War I steel-hulled cargo ship design

Class overview
- Name: EFC Design 1017
- Builders: Downey Shipbuilding
- Built: 1918–19 (USSB); 1920 (private)
- Planned: 10
- Completed: 11

General characteristics
- Type: Cargo ship
- Tonnage: 7,500 dwt
- Length: 387 ft 0 in (117.96 m)
- Beam: 52 ft 0 in (15.85 m)
- Draft: 27 ft 0 in (8.23 m)
- Installed power: 338 NHP
- Propulsion: Triple expansion engines, oil fuel

The Design 1017 ship (full name Emergency Fleet Corporation Design 1017) was a steel-hulled cargo ship design approved for production by the United States Shipping Board's Emergency Fleet Corporation (EFC) in World War I. They were referred to as the "Downey-type" as they were built by Downey Shipbuilding on Staten Island. 10 ships were completed for the USSB in late 1918 and through 1919. An additional ship was completed in 1920 for a private shipping company (502 nhp).

== Bibliography ==
- McKellar, Norman L. "Steel Shipbuilding under the U. S. Shipping Board, 1917-1921, Part II, Contract Steel Ships" (PDF). Steel Shipbuilding under the U. S. Shipping Board, 1917-1921. ShipScribe.
