= Design 1027 ship =

US cargo ship design in World War I

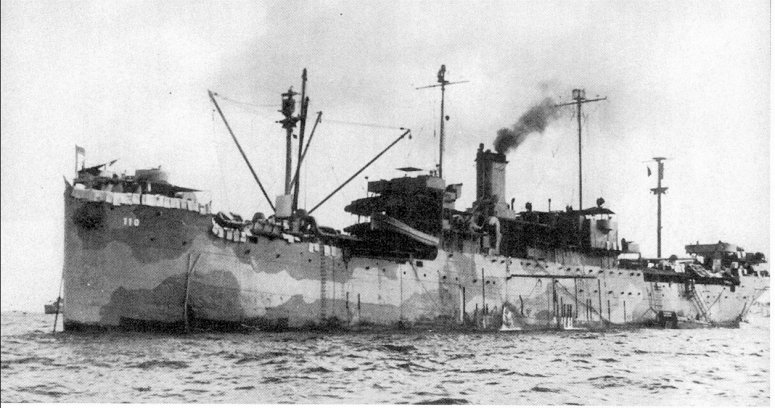
- Former Yomachichi at Ulithi while serving as Service Squadron Ten flagship USS Ocelot (IX-110), 6 May 1945

Class overview
- Name: EFT Design 1027
- Builders: Oscar Daniels Shipbuilding Company, Tampa, Florida
- Built: 1919–1921 (USSB)
- Planned: 10
- Completed: 10

General characteristics
- Type: Cargo ship
- Tonnage: 9,000 dwt
- Length: 402 ft 0 in (122.53 m)
- Beam: 54 ft 0 in (16.46 m)
- Draft: 34 ft 4 in (10.46 m)
- Propulsion: Triple expansion engine, oil fuel

The Design 1027 ship (full name Emergency Fleet Corporation Design 1027) was a steel-hulled cargo ship design approved for production by the United States Shipping Board's Emergency Fleet Corporation (EFT) in World War I. They were referred to as the Oscar Daniels-type as all the ships were built at the Oscar Daniels Shipbuilding Company, Tampa, Florida . A total of 10 ships were ordered and built from 1919 to 1921.

== Bibliography ==
- McKellar, Norman L. "Steel Shipbuilding under the U. S. Shipping Board, 1917-1921, Part III, Contract Steel Ships" (PDF). Steel Shipbuilding under the U. S. Shipping Board, 1917-1921. ShipScribe.
