= Design 1018 ship =

World War I steel-hulled cargo ship design

Class overview
- Name: EFT Design 1018
- Builders: Sun Shipbuilding & Drydock Co.
- Built: 1919–20 (USSB); 1920 (private)
- Planned: 4
- Completed: 5

General characteristics
- Type: Cargo ship
- Tonnage: 10,500 dwt
- Length: 434 ft 0 in (132.28 m)
- Beam: 58 ft 0 in (17.68 m)
- Draft: 27 ft 2 in (8.28 m)
- Propulsion: Triple expansion engines, oil fuel

The Design 1018 ship (full name Emergency Fleet Corporation Design 1018) was a steel-hulled cargo ship design approved for production by the United States Shipping Board's Emergency Fleet Corporation (EFT) in World War I. They were referred to as the "Sun-type" as they were built by Sun Shipbuilding & Drydock Co. in Chester, Pennsylvania. 4 ships were completed for the USSB in late 1919 and through 1920. An additional ship was completed in 1920 for a private shipping company.

== Bibliography ==
- McKellar, Norman L. "Steel Shipbuilding under the U. S. Shipping Board, 1917-1921, Part II, Contract Steel Ships" (PDF). Steel Shipbuilding under the U. S. Shipping Board, 1917-1921. ShipScribe.
