= Design 1016 ship =

World War I steel-hulled cargo ship design

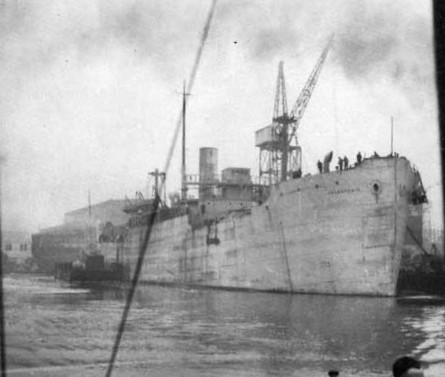
- SS Fort Wayne (1918)

Class overview
- Name: EFT Design 1016
- Built: 1918–19 (USSB)
- Planned: 14
- Completed: 14

General characteristics
- Type: Cargo ship
- Tonnage: 8,800 dwt
- Length: 410 ft 0 in (124.97 m)
- Beam: 54 ft 0 in (16.46 m)
- Draft: 27 ft 0 in (8.23 m)
- Propulsion: Turbine engine, oil fuel

The Design 1016 ship (full name Emergency Fleet Corporation Design 1016) was a steel-hulled cargo ship design approved for production by the United States Shipping Board's Emergency Fleet Corporation (EFT) during World War I. They were referred to as the "Baltimore Drydock"-type.

They were built at two East Coast yards:

- Baltimore Shipbuilding & Drydock Company, Baltimore, Maryland, eight ships, no cancellations
- Groton Iron Works, Groton, Connecticut, six ships, no cancellations

== Bibliography ==
- McKellar, Norman L. "Steel Shipbuilding under the U. S. Shipping Board, 1917-1921, Part I, Contract Steel Ships" (PDF). Steel Shipbuilding under the U. S. Shipping Board, 1917-1921. ShipScribe.
