= Design 1041 ship =

Standard ship types of the US

Class overview
- Name: EFT Design 1041
- Builders: Moore Shipbuilding Company, Oakland, California
- Built: 1919–1920
- Planned: 13
- Completed: 18 (13 for USSB)

General characteristics
- Tonnage: 10,000 dwt
- Length: 425 ft 0 in (129.54 m)
- Beam: 57 ft 0 in (17.37 m)
- Draft: 31.2 ft 0 in (9.51 m)
- Installed power: oil fuel
- Propulsion: Triple expansion engine

The Design 1041 ship (full name Emergency Fleet Corporation Design 1041) was a steel-hulled tanker ship design approved for production by the United States Shipping Board's Emergency Fleet Corporation (EFT) in World War I. A total of 13 ships were ordered and completed for the USSB from 1919 to 1920. The ships were constructed at the Oakland, California shipyard of Moore Shipbuilding Company. An additional 5 ships were completed separately by the shipyard.

== Bibliography ==
- McKellar, Norman L. "Steel Shipbuilding under the U. S. Shipping Board, 1917-1921, Part IV, Contract Steel Ships" (PDF). Steel Shipbuilding under the U. S. Shipping Board, 1917-1921. ShipScribe.
