= SS Comol Cuba =

History

(1919–1939) (1939–1948)
- Name: Red Jacket (1919); Inspector (1919–1927); Dora (1927–1938); Comol Cuba (1938–1948)
- Owner: United States Shipping Board (1919–1921); Dunbar Molasses Company (1921–1927); U.S. Tank Ship Corporation (1927–1928); Steamship Dora Corporation (1928–1938); Commercial Molasses Corporation (1938–1948)
- Builder: American International Shipbuilding Corporation, Philadelphia
- Yard number: 1482
- Launched: 18 September 1919
- Completed: 31 October 1919
- Identification: US Official Number 219159; code letters: LTMN
- Fate: Broken up, 1948

General characteristics
- Type: Design 1022 cargo ship
- Tonnage: 7,500 dwt
- Length: 390 ft (120 m)
- Beam: 54 ft (16 m)
- Draft: 27 ft 5 in (8.36 m)
- Installed power: Oil-fired steam turbines
- Propulsion: Single screw

SS Comol Cuba (ex-Dora, ex-Inspector, ex-Red Jacket) was a Design 1022 cargo ship built for the United States Shipping Board immediately after World War I. Converted to a tanker, she spent most of her career transporting molasses, a byproduct of sugar refining, to the United States. During World War II, she transported petroleum before returning to the private sector.

== History ==
She was laid down as Red Jacket, yard number 1482 at the Philadelphia, Pennsylvania shipyard of the American International Shipbuilding Corporation, one of 110 Design 1022 cargo ships built for the United States Shipping Board. She was launched as the Inspector on 18 September 2019 and completed on 31 October 1919. In 1921, she was purchased by the Dunbar Molasses Company and converted into a tanker with a 344,963 gallon capacity. In 1927, she was purchased by the U.S. Tank Ship Corporation and renamed Dora. In 1928, she was purchased by private investors via the Steamship Dora Corporation, a New York incorporated special-purpose entity established specifically for her purchase, with U.S. Tank Ship Corporation as ship manager. In 1938, she was purchased by the Commercial Molasses Corporation and renamed Comol Cuba. In 1939, her registration was changed to Panama. During World War II, she operated mostly in the Caribbean and the Gulf of Mexico. In January 1943, she was part of convoy PK-135, the last Pilottown, Louisiana to Key West, Florida convoy.

In the fourth quarter of 1948, she was broken up in New Orleans by the Southern Scrap Materials Company.

== General bibliography ==
- McKellar, Norman L. "Steel Shipbuilding under the U.S. Shipping Board, 1917–1921, Part II, Contract Steel Ships, p. 588" (PDF). Steel Shipbuilding under the U. S. Shipping Board, 1917-1921. ShipScribe.
- Marine Review (1920). "1919 Construction Record of U.S. Yards". The Marine Review. 50 (February). New York: 97.
