= SS Cambridge =

Cambridge was the name of a number of steamships.

- SS Cambridge (1886), a Great Eastern Railway passenger ferry
- SS Cambridge (1916), built as Vogtland and surrendered by Germany as war reparations
- SS Cambridge (1919), a Design 1023 ship built by the Submarine Boat Company 1919, broken up 1925
