= Mopang =

Mopang may refer to:

- Mopang, a Design 1023 ship mined and sunk in 1921
- Lake Mopang in Maine (see List of lakes in Maine)
- Mopang Stream, a tributary of Machias River in Maine.
