= SS Suportco =

History

United States
- Name: Suportco
- Namesake: Port of Newark
- Owner: USSB (1920–1931); Portland California Steamship Co. (1931–1939)
- Builder: Submarine Boat Corporation, Newark
- Yard number: 123
- Laid down: 1 December 1919
- Launched: 22 May 1920
- Completed: July 1920
- Homeport: New York
- Identification: US Official Number 220248; code letters: LWTC
- Fate: Broken up, 11 February 1939

General characteristics
- Type: Design 1023 Cargo ship
- Tonnage: 3,545 GRT; 5,075 DWT; 2,174 NRT
- Length: 324.0 ft (98.8 m) registry length
- Beam: 46 ft 2 in (14.07 m)
- Draft: 25 ft (7.6 m)
- Depth: 25.0 ft (7.6 m)
- Installed power: 386 NHP
- Propulsion: 2 oil fired boilers, steam turbine, single screw propeller; 4 Bayles vessels: triple expansion steam engine
- Speed: 10.5 kn (19.4 km/h; 12.1 mph)
- Range: 9,450 nmi (17,500 km; 10,870 mi)
- Crew: 36

SS Suportco was a Design 1023 cargo ship built for the United States Shipping Board immediately after World War I.

== History ==
She was laid down at yard number 123 at the Newark, New Jersey shipyard of the Submarine Boat Corporation (SBC), one of 132 Design 1023 cargo ships built for the United States Shipping Board (there were 154 ships of the class built in total). She was launched on 22 May 1920, completed in July 1920, and named Suportco after her builder and the Port of Newark (SUbmarine PORT COrporation). In 1931, she was one of 22 Design 1023 ships purchased by the Portland California Steamship Company. In 1939, she was broken up by the Boston I & M Company.

== Bibliography ==
- McKellar, Norman L. "Steel Shipbuilding under the U. S. Shipping Board, 1917-1921, Part III, Contract Steel Ships" (PDF). Steel Shipbuilding under the U. S. Shipping Board, 1917-1921. ShipScribe.
- Marine Review (1921). "1920 Construction Record of U.S. Yards". The Marine Review. 51 (February). New York: 100.
