= SS Suedco =

Cargo ship built for the United States Shipping Board following the First World War

History

United States
- Name: Suedco
- Namesake: Electro-Dynamic Company
- Owner: USSB (1920–1931); Portland California Steamship Co. (1931–1934); Matheson Alkali Works (1934–1935)
- Builder: Submarine Boat Corporation, Newark
- Yard number: 121
- Laid down: 24 November 1919
- Launched: 15 April 1920
- Completed: April 1920
- Homeport: New York
- Identification: US Official Number 220011; code letters: LWMV
- Fate: Broken up, 30 July 1935

General characteristics
- Type: Design 1023 Cargo ship
- Tonnage: 3,545 GRT; 5,075 DWT; 2,174 NRT
- Length: 324.0 ft (98.8 m) registry length
- Beam: 46 ft 2 in (14.07 m)
- Draft: 25 ft (7.6 m)
- Depth: 25.0 ft (7.6 m)
- Installed power: 386 NHP
- Propulsion: 2 oil fired boilers, steam turbine, single screw propeller; 4 Bayles vessels: triple expansion steam engine
- Speed: 10 kn (19 km/h; 12 mph)
- Range: 7,000 nmi (13,000 km; 8,100 mi)
- Crew: 36

SS Suedco was a Design 1023 cargo ship built for the United States Shipping Board immediately after World War I.

== History ==
She was laid down as yard number 121 at the Newark, New Jersey shipyard of the Submarine Boat Corporation (SBC), one of 132 Design 1023 cargo ships built for the United States Shipping Board (there were 154 ships of the class built in total). She was launched on 15 April 1920, completed in June 1920, and named Suedco. She was named after Electro-Dynamic Company, (her name being a portmanteau of her manufacturer and her namesake, SUbmarine Boat Electro Dynamic COrporation). In 1931, she was one of 22 Design 1023 ships purchased by the Portland California Steamship Company. In 1934, she was purchased by Matheson Alkali Works of Saltville, Virginia, a manufacturer of chlorine and caustic soda. In 1935, she was broken up.

== Bibliography ==
- McKellar, Norman L. "Steel Shipbuilding under the U. S. Shipping Board, 1917-1921, Part III, Contract Steel Ships" (PDF). Steel Shipbuilding under the U. S. Shipping Board, 1917-1921. ShipScribe.
- Marine Review (1921). "1920 Construction Record of U.S. Yards". The Marine Review. 51 (February). New York: 100.
