= SS Suboatco =

American cargo ship

History

United States
- Name: Suboatco
- Namesake: Submarine Boat Corporation
- Owner: USSB (1920–1931); Portland California Steamship Co. (1931–1935)
- Builder: Submarine Boat Corporation, Newark
- Yard number: 121
- Laid down: 21 November 1919
- Launched: 13 April 1920
- Completed: June 1920
- Homeport: New York
- Identification: US Official Number 220010; code letters: LWMT
- Fate: Broken up, 1 March 1935

General characteristics
- Type: Design 1023 Cargo ship
- Tonnage: 3,545 GRT; 5,075 DWT; 2,174 NRT
- Length: 324.0 ft (98.8 m) registry length
- Beam: 46 ft 2 in (14.07 m)
- Draft: 25 ft (7.6 m)
- Depth: 25.0 ft (7.6 m)
- Installed power: 386 NHP
- Propulsion: 2 oil fired boilers, steam turbine, single screw propeller; 4 Bayles vessels: triple expansion steam engine
- Speed: 10 kn (19 km/h; 12 mph)
- Range: 7,000 nmi (13,000 km; 8,100 mi)
- Crew: 36

SS Suboatco was a Design 1023 cargo ship built for the United States Shipping Board immediately after World War I.

== History ==
She was laid down as yard number 121 at the Newark, New Jersey shipyard of the Submarine Boat Corporation (SBC), one of 132 Design 1023 cargo ships built for the United States Shipping Board (there were 154 ships of the class built in total). She was launched on 13 April 1920, completed in June 1920, and named Suboatco after her builder SUbmarine BOAT COrporation. In 1931, she was one of 22 Design 1023 ships purchased by the Portland California Steamship Company. In 1935, she was broken up.

== Bibliography ==
- McKellar, Norman L. "Steel Shipbuilding under the U. S. Shipping Board, 1917-1921, Part III, Contract Steel Ships" (PDF). Steel Shipbuilding under the U. S. Shipping Board, 1917-1921. ShipScribe.
- Marine Review (1921). "1920 Construction Record of U.S. Yards". The Marine Review. 51 (February). New York: 100.
