= SS Coast Farmer =

1920 steel-hulled cargo ship

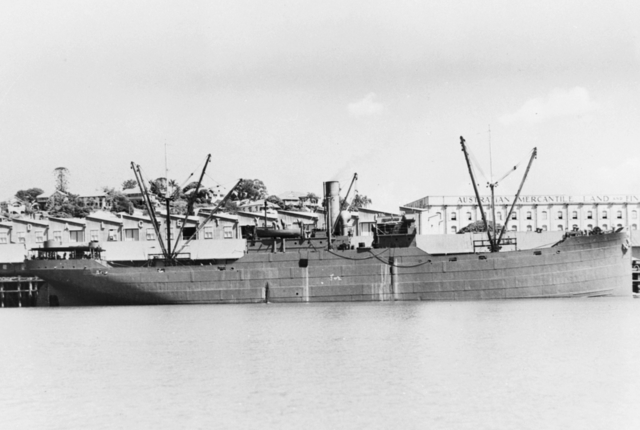
- Coast Farmer in port sometime in late 1941 or early 1942

History

United States
- Name: Riverside Bridge (1920–1928); Point Arena (1928–1937); Coast Farmer (1937—1942)
- Builder: Submarine Boat Company, Newark
- Yard number: 103
- Launched: 7 January 1920
- Identification: ON 219585
- Fate: Sunk, 20 July 1942

General characteristics
- Type: EFC Design 1023
- Tonnage: 3,290 GRT
- Length: 324 ft (99 m)
- Beam: 46.2 ft (14.1 m)
- Draught: 25 ft (7.6 m)
- Installed power: 386NHP
- Propulsion: geared steam turbine
- Speed: 10.5 knots (19.4 km/h; 12.1 mph)

Coast Farmer, gaining the name in 1937 and previously bearing the names Point Arena (1928) and Riverside Bridge (1920), was a U.S. Shipping Board Emergency Fleet Corporation Design 1023 ship ordered under the name Minnewawa and built as hull #103 by Submarine Boat Company, Newark, New Jersey in 1920. Coast Farmer is noted as being a part of the Pensacola Convoy landing the supplies and troops intended for the Philippines in Darwin, Australia after being diverted on the news of the attack on Pearl Harbor. The ship became even more notable being the first of only three ships successfully running the Japanese blockade into the Philippines; leaving Brisbane February (Note: References, including cited official histories, have differing days of departure in February.) 1942. (Note: Charles Dana Gibson notes the food supplies, transshipped from Mindanao aboard two Filipino coasters, with only the Elcano making Corregidor, were largely spoiled and "canned goods had lost their labels rendering their contents a mystery" to the recipients.) Coast Farmer was torpedoed and sunk off Jervis Bay, New South Wales on 20 July 1942.

== Commercial to World War II Service ==
The Gulf-Pacific Line operated the ship as Point Arena from 1928 to 1937. (Note: Lloyd's registers for those years shows "Gulf Pacific Mail Line" and "Swayne & Hoyt, Ltd., the operator of GPML ships.) The ship was acquired and operated as Coast Farmer by the Coastwise Line, a coastal line associated with Pacific Far East Lines, until taken for war time service by the War Shipping Administration on 22 December 1941, the date the Pensacola Convoy reached Brisbane Australia. (Note: The Vessel Data Card indicates with TCA a Transportation Corps agreement, thus the effective date upon which the ship entered the Southwest Pacific Area's local fleet.)

=== Pensacola Convoy ===
Coast Farmer was one of three merchant cargo ships in the convoy and largely carried civilian supplies for the shops of Guam and Manila. After arrival the Coast Farmer along with Meigs and the Admiral Halstead were retained by United States Forces in Australia (USFIA) for operations in Australia.

=== Australia-Philippine Operations ===
Coast Farmer was provided a gun crew from the 453d Ordnance Company, loaded with military supplies including 2,500 tons of rations and departed Brisbane February 10, 1942 (Note: Masterson's work was the official Transportation Corps study undertaken under Chief, Military History, and is cited in the subsequent official histories as an authoritative source using primary materials. The 10 February date is also found in other references, though they may actually be based on Masterson.) for the Philippines where the ship delivered its cargo at Anakan, Mindanao, on 17 February. The supplies were offloaded to the Filipino coasters Lepus and Elcano who then departed for Manila. The Coast Farmer was then loaded for the return trip with tin and baled rubber brought from Cebu City by the Filipino coasters Agustina, Cegostina, and Emilia. On departure a member of the gun crew sent ashore to repair machine guns did not return in time and was left behind.

John A. Matson, master of Coast Farmer on this operation, was later awarded the Army's Distinguished Service Medal and the Merchant Marine Distinguished Service Medal. Coast Farmer became one of only three ships, the others being Dona Nati and The China Navigation Company's Anhui, to successfully break the Japanese blockade. The supplies brought by the Coast Farmer were destroyed in transshipment when the smaller ships trying to reach Corregidor were sunk by gunfire from Japanese naval forces off Mindanao.

On her return she was one of seven vessels in the USFIA Army fleet and one of three assigned indefinitely. Subsequently, General MacArthur received confirmation the vessel was under War Shipping Administration charter for his use without restriction. The Coast Farmer was engaged in supporting the war effort in coastwise shipping when the Japanese submarine I-11 torpedoed and sank her off Jervis Bay, New South Wales, Australia, on 20 July 1942. (Note: Australian and U.S. sources give 20 July date, I-11 page and Australian naval historian Gill give 0200 on 21 July, probably difference in time kept by sources in this area.) 1942. One crew member was lost. The ship was hit amidships at about 2 a.m. and sank within twenty minutes with the submarine surfacing and examining the ship's lifeboats by searchlight before departing the area.

== See also ==
- SS Mopang sister ship
- SS Admiral Halstead sister ship
- SS Coast Trader sister ship

== References cited ==
- American Merchant Marine at War. "Chronological List of U.S. Ships Sunk or Damaged during July to December 1942". American Merchant Marine at War.
- Colton, T. (2012). "Submarine Boat, Newark NJ". Shipbuilding History. Archived from the original on 2012-11-03.
- Gibson, Charles Dana; Gibson, E. Kay (July 2008), "Attempts to Supply The Philippines by Sea: 1942" (PDF), The Northern Mariner, XVIII (3/4)
- Gill, G. Hermon (1968). Royal Australian Navy 1939–1942. Australia in the War of 1939–1945. Series 2 – Navy. Vol. 2. Canberra: Australian War Memorial. LCCN 76454854. Archived from the original on 2013-09-27.
- Hackett, Bob; Kingsepp, Sander (2012). "IJN Submarine I-11: Tabular Record of Movement". SENSUIKAN!.
- "Lloyd's Register (1930–1931)" (PDF). Lloyd's Register. 1931 – via Plimsoll Ship Data.
- "Lloyd's Register (1937–1938)" (PDF). Lloyd's Register. 1938 – via Plimsoll Ship Data.
- Maritime Administration. "Coast Farmer". Vessel Status Card. U.S. Department of Transportation, Maritime Administration. Archived from the original on March 25, 2014.
- The Marine Review (February 1921). "1920 Construction Records of U.S. Yards". The Marine Review. 51 (2). London — New York — Cleveland: The Penton Publishing Company.
- McKellar, Norman L. "Steel Shipbuilding under the U. S. Shipping Board, 1917–1921, Part III, Contract Steel Ships". ShipScribe.
- Masterson, James R. (1949). U. S. Army Transportation In The Southwest Pacific Area 1941–1947. Washington, D. C.: Transportation Unit, Historical Division, Special Staff, U. S. Army.
- Mayo, Lida (1968). The Technical Services—The Ordnance Department: On Beachhead And Battlefront. United States Army In World War II. Washington, DC: Center Of Military History, United States Army. LCCN 79014631. Archived from the original on December 6, 2008.
- Miles, Patricia. "Merchant Navy Losses off the Australian Coast". Mercantile Marine. Archived from the original on 2014-05-02.
- Morton, Lewis (1993). The War in the Pacific: The Fall Of The Philippines. United States Army In World War II. Washington, D.C.: Center Of Military History, United States Army. LCCN 53063678. Archived from the original on 7 April 2013.
- Stauffer, Alvin P. (1990). The Quartermaster Corps: Operations In The War Against Japan. United States Army In World War II. Washington, D. C.: Center Of Military History, United States Army. LCCN 56060001. Archived from the original on October 31, 2011.
