= SS New England (1920) =

History

United States
- Name: New England
- Namesake: New England
- Owner: USSB
- Builder: Submarine Boat Corp., Newark
- Yard number: 112
- Laid down: 21 October 1919
- Launched: 31 January 1920
- Christened: New England Iron
- Completed: April 1920
- Homeport: Newark
- Identification: US Official Number 219583; code letters: LVNQ
- Fate: Broken up, 1929

General characteristics
- Type: Cargo ship
- Tonnage: 3,545 GRT; 5,075 DWT; 2,174 NRT
- Length: 324.0 ft (98.8 m) registry length
- Beam: 46.2 ft (14.1 m)
- Draft: 25 ft (7.6 m)
- Depth: 25.0 ft (7.6 m)
- Installed power: 386 NHP
- Propulsion: 2 oil fired boilers, steam turbine, single screw propeller; 4 Bayles vessels: triple expansion steam engine
- Speed: 10.5 kn (19.4 km/h; 12.1 mph)
- Range: 10,080 nmi (18,670 km; 11,600 mi)
- Crew: 37

SS New England was a Design 1023 cargo ship built for the United States Shipping Board immediately after World War I.

== History ==
She was laid down as yard number 112 at the Newark, New Jersey shipyard of the Submarine Boat Corporation (SBC), one of 132 Design 1023 cargo ships built for the United States Shipping Board (there were 154 ships of the class built in total). She was launched on 31 January 1920, completed in April 1920, and named the New England. In 1929, she was broken up at the Baltimore, Maryland shipyard of Union Shipbuilding.

== Bibliography ==
- McKellar, Norman L. "Steel Shipbuilding under the U. S. Shipping Board, 1917-1921, Part III, Contract Steel Ships" (PDF). Steel Shipbuilding under the U. S. Shipping Board, 1917-1921. ShipScribe.
- Marine Review (1921). "1920 Construction Record of U.S. Yards". The Marine Review. 51 (February). New York: 99.
