= SS Admiral Halstead =

Merchant ship built in 1920

- Aerial starboard side view of the U.S. cargo vessel Admiral Halstead. (Australian War Memorial)

History
- Name: Suwordenco; Admiral Halstead
- Owner: Submarine Boat Corporation (1922—1930); Pacific Steamship Company (1930-1936); Pacific Lighterage Company (1936-1947); Pacific Mail Steamship Company (1947-1949)
- Operator: Transmarine (1922—1930); Pacific Steamship Company (1930-1936); Pacific Lighterage (1936-1947); Pacific Mail Steamship Company (1947-1949)
- Port of registry: New York, New York
- Builder: Submarine Boat Corporation, Newark, New Jersey
- Yard number: 142
- Launched: 22 October 1920
- Completed: November 1920
- Identification: Official number: 220862; Call letters: MCBK
- Fate: Broken up 1949

General characteristics
- Type: EFC Design 1023, postwar commercial completion
- Tonnage: 3,545 GRT; 5,350 DWT
- Displacement: 7,615 tons
- Length: 335 ft 6 in (102.3 m) LOA; 334 ft (101.8 m) B.P.
- Beam: 46 ft (14.0 m)
- Draft: 23 ft (7.0 m)
- Depth: 28 ft 6 in (8.7 m) molded
- Installed power: 2 Babcock & Wilcox water tube boilers
- Propulsion: Westinghouse steam turbine
- Speed: 10.5 kn (12.1 mph; 19.4 km/h)

SS Admiral Halstead was a merchant ship built in 1920 by the Submarine Boat Corporation, Newark, New Jersey, and operating originally as Suwordenco. The ship's history illustrates the state of the industry as the massive World War I shipbuilding program transitioned to an effort to sell and operate hulls in a market glutted by wartime shipbuilding. By the outbreak of World War II Suwordenco was one of the few ships operating as its owners went bankrupt. The ship was bought for operation from the Puget Sound to California ports until it was caught up in the prelude to the United States' entry into the war.

The ship played a role in the effort to support the Philippines, finding itself in the Pensacola Convoy that was diverted to Australia. The convoy reached Brisbane on 22 December 1941 with Admiral Halstead being placed under U.S. Army charter that day to be operated by its company, the Pacific Lighterage Company. The convoy provided the base for the United States Army buildup in Australia. Admiral Halstead was sent to northern Australia arriving at Darwin to be present when the port was bombed on 19 February 1942. The ship came under attack along with the transports of the Timor Convoy escorted by USS Houston and other ships in port. Admiral Halstead was damaged and the crew abandoned but returned and over the next five days, working at night and moving to an anchorage by day, unloaded some 8,000 drums of the cargo of aviation gasoline.

== Construction ==
Submarine Boat Corporation, Newark, New Jersey, had operated the Newark yard to build Emergency Fleet Corporation (EFC) Design 1023 ships designed by Theodore E. Ferris for the United States Shipping Board (USSB) with thirty-two hulls cancelled as the war ended. After the war the USSB agreed to sell the yard to the operator after paying rent for three years and selling steel on hand at half the original cost. Those thirty-two ships were then completed on Submarine Boat's own account. Suwordenco, yard number 142, was launched on 22 October 1920 and completed in November 1920. The name was a construct given to all thirty-two ships. It was formed by a standard prefix "Su" and suffix "co" from Submarine Boat Corporation with an intervening "word" based on a person, place or company. Suwordenco was named for company general manager B. L. Worden. The ship, assigned official number 220862 and call letters MCBK, was registered in New York, New York operated by Submarine Boat's shipping subsidiary, Transmarine.

The standard ship's specifications were for a 3,545 GRT, 5,350 DWT ship of 335 ft 6 in (102.3 m) length overall, 334 ft (101.8 m) length between perpendiculars, 46 ft (14.0 m) molded beam, 28 ft 6 in (8.7 m) molded depth, loaded displacement of 7,615 tons with a draft of 23 ft (7.0 m). Ship's power for propulsion and auxiliaries was steam from two Babcock & Wilcox oil fired water tube boilers. Propulsion was by a Westinghouse steam turbine providing 1,500 shaft horsepower that could propel the ship at 10.5 kn (12.1 mph; 19.4 km/h). Five cargo holds had a bale capacity of 226,150 cubic feet (6,403.9 m^{3}), and a grain capacity of 269,600 cubic feet (7,634.2 m^{3}). Bunker capacity of 301,970 US gallons (1,143,100 L) gave a range of over 18,000 nmi (21,000 mi; 33,000 km).

Submarine Boat went into receivership in 1930 with its Transmarine operating subsidiary ceasing operations. Suwordenco, the last operating ship, arrived in the port of San Pedro, California on 13 January 1930 with an uncertain future. Suwordenco was sold later in 1930 to operate with the Admiral Line of the Pacific Steamship Company and renamed Admiral Halstead. (Note: The name is likely in honor of Rear Admiral Alexander S. Halstead, commander of U.S. Naval Forces in France during the WW I. He directed the return of troops after the war.) After renovation by the Moore Dry Dock Company, Oakland, California, the ship was put on the Puget Sound — California route. In 1936 the ship was sold to Pacific Lighterage.

The company's main routes were from Alaska to California but it had some service into the Pacific to the Philippines. Admiral Halstead was on such service in May 1939 when it lent assistance to the effort to get the USS U. S. Grant off a reef at Guam.

== World War II ==
Pacific Lighterage's Admiral Halstead entered the war as part of the Pensacola Convoy that departed Honolulu on the way to the Philippines. The ship's cargo was approximately 3,000 drums of aviation gasoline. (Note: Cargo of the three civilian vessels is described in Mayo as "loaded with general civilian cargo for merchants in Guam and the Philippines" but other references are clear that Bloemfontein carried crated P-40s, munitions and passengers while Admiral Halstead had drummed aviation gasoline that after arrival at Brisbane and apparently augmented ended up at Darwin the day before the Japanese attack on that port.) The convoy, avoiding the Japanese Mandate island areas with a route southwest, had crossed the Equator on 6 December and received the news of war the morning of 7 December 1941. The convoy arrived at Brisbane on 22 December. On arrival Admiral Halstead was placed under U.S. Army charter with Pacific Lighterage as operator. The ship became part of the Southwest Pacific Area (SWPA) Australian based permanent local fleet on 31 December 1941 assigned the local identification number X-3.

The ship arrived in Darwin on 18 February 1942 loaded with 14,000 drums of aviation gasoline destined for the Philippines. On 19 February 1942 Japanese aircraft attacked the port, surrounding installations, and other ships in the port and area. Those ships included ships of the Timor convoy (Note: Some references have Admiral Halstead as a part of the Timor Convoy escorted by USS Houston. The official references are specific about the ships in that convoy: U.S. transports Mauna Loa and Meigs; Australian transports Tulagi and Portmar.) that had been escorted by USS Houston and turned back by air attacks. Admiral Halstead was strafed and near bomb misses sprung plates causing some flooding. The crew abandoned ship but returned to bring the ship in to unload the critical aviation gasoline cargo over a number of nights and going offshore to during the day. The crew of the heavily damaged and beached Portmar was drafted to unload the cargo. At one point, after objecting that the troops and Australian stevedores were idle and not so engaged, they were held under arrest.

Admiral Halstead remained with the SWPA permanent local fleet until August 1945.

== Post war ==
Admiral Halstead was delivered for commercial operation to Pacific Lighterage at San Francisco on 2 March 1946. The company became Pacific Mail Steamship Company in 1947 with the ship operating with that line until broken up in 1949.

== See also ==
- SS Mopang sister ship
- SS Coast Farmer sister ship
- SS Coast Trader sister ship

== Bibliography ==
- Dunn, Peter (21 February 2020). "Pensacola Convoy (PLUM CONVOY) Arriving in Australia During WWII".
- Bureau of Navigation (1922). Forty Fourth Annual List of Merchant Vessels of the United States, Year ended June 30, 1922. Washington, D.C.: Department of Commerce, Bureau of Navigation.
- Gill, G. Hermon (1957). Royal Australian Navy 1939-1942. Australia in the War of 1939–1945. Series 2 – Navy. Vol. 1. Canberra: Australian War Memorial. LCCN 58037940.
- Maritime Administration. "Admiral Halstead". Ship History Database Vessel Status Card. U.S. Department of Transportation, Maritime Administration.
- Masterson, Dr. James R. (1949). U. S. Army Transportation In The Southwest Pacific Area 1941-1947. Washington, D. C.: Transportation Unit, Historical Division, Special Staff, U. S. Army.
- Matloff, Maurice; Snell, Edwin M. (1953). The War Department: Strategic Planning For Coalition Warfare 1941-1942. United States Army In World War II. Washington, DC: Center Of Military History, United States Army. LCCN 53061477.
- Mayo, Lida (1968). The Technical Services—The Ordnance Department: On Beachhead And Battlefront. United States Army In World War II. Washington, DC: Center Of Military History, United States Army. LCCN 79014631.
- McKellar, Norman L. "Steel Shipbuilding under the U. S. Shipping Board, 1917-1921, Part III, Contract Steel Ships". Steel Shipbuilding under the U. S. Shipping Board, 1917-1921. ShipScribe.
- Naval History And Heritage Command (12 December 2017). "U. S. Grant II (Id. No. 3011)". Dictionary of American Naval Fighting Ships. Naval History And Heritage Command.
- Office Of Naval Intelligence (1943). The Java Sea Campaign. Combat Narratives. Washington, DC: United States Navy. LCCN 2009397493. Archived from the original on June 26, 2015.
- Pacific American Steamship Association (1920). "Pacific Marine Review". San Francisco: J.S. Hines.
- Pacific American Steamship Association (1930). "Who's Who — Afloat and Ashore". Pacific Marine Review. San Francisco: J.S. Hines.
- Pacific American Steamship Association (1933). "Pacific Steamship Company". Pacific Marine Review. San Francisco: J.S. Hines.
- San Pedro News Pilot (14 January 1930). "Transmarine Haitus Lets Nelson Line in". San Pedro News Pilot. Vol. 2, no. 269.
- Submarine Boat Corporation (October 23, 1920). "Suwordenco Launched on Friday". Speed Up. Vol. 3, no. 40.
- Submarine Boat Corporation (November 15, 1923). "Explaining the Names of Transmarine Steamers". Speed Up. Vol. 6, no. 11.
- Supreme Court of the United States (1952). Records and Briefs of the United States Supreme Court, October Term 1952 — Calmar Steamship Co. v. United States/Calmar Steamship Co. v. Sidney Keith Scott, One of the Lloyds Underwriters, Et. Al.
- USMM (31 January 2007). "U.S. Merchant Marine in World War II". American Merchant Marine at War.
- USSB (1935). American Flag Services (Report). United States Shipping Board Bureau.
