= Pacific-Alaska Navigation Company =

American shipping company

The Pacific-Alaska Navigation Company was an American passenger and freight ocean shipping company that operated between 1912 and 1916 on the West Coast of North America. It was formed as a holding company during the merger of the Alaska Pacific Steamship Company and the Alaska Coast Company. During its four years of life, its fleet became known as the Admiral Line because its ships (for example, the Admiral Halstead) were usually named for former U.S. Navy admirals. The company was operated by president H.F. "Bert" Alexander, a former Tacoma longshoreman who worked his way up the ranks.

During the company's brief history, it suffered at least two significant accidents. The steamer SS Yukon ran aground June 23, 1913 on the northwest coast of Sanak Island on a reef subsequently named for the ship. A second major accident occurred Aug. 26, 1914 when the SS Admiral Sampson was rammed by the SS Princess Victoria of the Canadian Pacific Line. Both ships were operating in heavy fog within Puget Sound, 18 miles north of Seattle. The Admiral Sampson sank, killing 11, while the Princess Victoria returned to Seattle with the survivors of the accident.

In 1916, the Pacific-Alaska Navigation Company operated nine steamships when it merged with the Pacific Coast Steamship Company, operator of 13 ships. The resulting company became known as the Pacific Steamship Company.

== See also ==
- Pacific Marine Review, August 1920: "The Admiral Line"
- Pacific Coast Steamship Companies Collection (H.Mss.1043), Special Collections, Honnold/Mudd Library, Claremont University Consortium.
