= SS Cambridge (1919) =

American cargo ship

History

United States
- Name: Cambridge
- Owner: USSB
- Builder: Submarine Boat Company, Newark
- Yard number: 57
- Laid down: 13 March 1919
- Launched: 30 June 1919
- Completed: 29 August 1919
- Home port: Newark
- Identification: US Official Number 218634; code letters: LSFP
- Fate: Broken up, 1926

General characteristics
- Type: Design 1023 Cargo ship
- Tonnage: 3,283 GRT; 5,075 DWT; 2,000 NRT
- Length: 324.0 ft (98.8 m) registry length
- Beam: 46.2 ft (14.1 m)
- Draft: 25 ft (7.6 m)
- Depth: 25.0 ft (7.6 m)
- Installed power: 386 NHP
- Propulsion: 2 oil fired boilers, steam turbine, single screw propeller; 4 Bayles vessels: triple expansion steam engine
- Speed: 10.5 kn (19.4 km/h; 12.1 mph)
- Range: 7,000 nmi (13,000 km; 8,100 mi)
- Crew: 37

SS Cambridge was a Design 1023 cargo ship built for the United States Shipping Board immediately after World War I.

== History ==
She was laid down at yard number 57 at the Newark, New Jersey shipyard of the Submarine Boat Corporation (SBC), one of 132 Design 1023 cargo ships built for the United States Shipping Board (there were 154 ships of the class built in total). She was launched on 30 June 1919, completed in August 1919, and named the Cambridge. Total cost was $1,044,313. In 1925, she was broken up by the Ford Motor Company who purchased 200 vessels from the Shipping Board for $1,706,000 and used the steel to make cars.

== Bibliography ==
- McKellar, Norman L. "Steel Shipbuilding under the U. S. Shipping Board, 1917-1921, Part III, Contract Steel Ships" (PDF). Steel Shipbuilding under the U. S. Shipping Board, 1917-1921. ShipScribe.
- Marine Review (1920). "1919 Construction Record of U.S. Yards". The Marine Review. 50 (February). New York: 107.
