= USS Niagara (PG-52) =

Gunboat of the United States Navy

Coordinates: 9.263°S 157.767°E

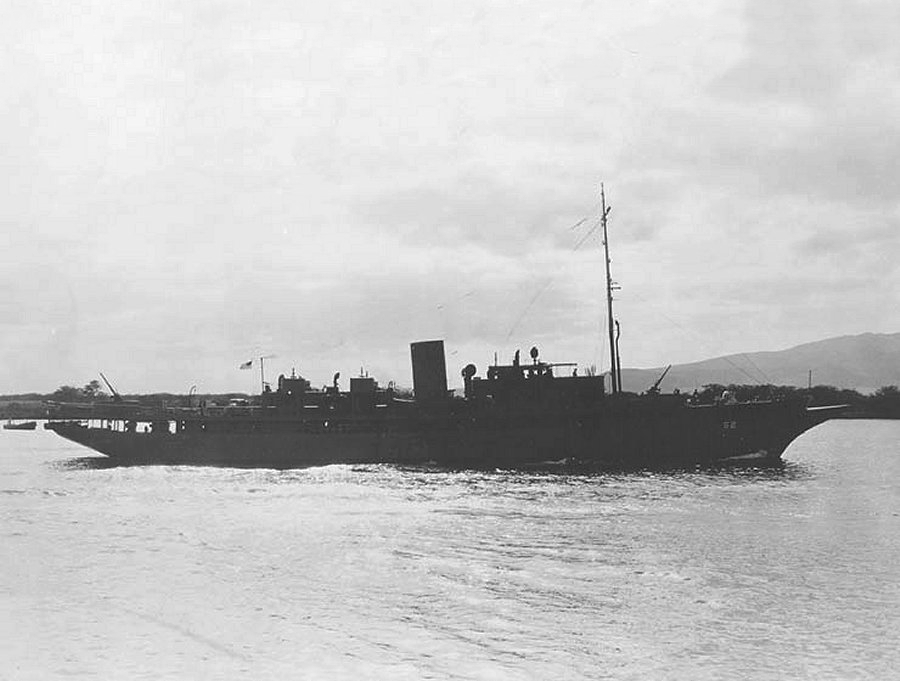
- No Photo Available

History

United States
- Name: Hi-Esmaro
- Owner: Mrs. Hiram Edward Manville
- Builder: Bath Iron Works, Maine
- Laid down: 14 November 1928
- Launched: 7 June 1929
- Acquired: 20 August 1929 (Delivered)
- Fate: Purchased by the US Navy, 16 October 1940

United States
- Name: USS Niagara
- Namesake: Fort Niagara
- Builder: New York Navy Yard (Conversion)
- Acquired: 16 October 1940
- Commissioned: 20 January 1941
- Reclassified: Coastal minelayer, 31 October 1940; Patrol gunboat, 15 November 1940; MTB tender, 13 January 1943
- Identification: Callsign: NUMW; Hull number: CMc-2 (31 October 1940) PG-52 (15 November 1940) AGP-1 (13 January 1943)
- Fate: Lost to enemy air attack and then scuttled by a PT boat, 23 May 1943

General characteristics (USS Niagara)
- Type: Motor torpedo boat tender
- Displacement: 1,922 long tons (1,953 t) full
- Length: 267 ft (81.4 m)
- Beam: 35 ft 4 in (10.8 m)
- Draft: 17 ft (5.2 m) at full load
- Propulsion: 2 × 1,500 shp (1,119 kW) Cooper-Bessemer diesel engines; 2 shafts
- Speed: 16 knots (30 km/h; 18 mph)
- Complement: 139 officers and enlisted men
- Armament: 2 × 3"/50 caliber guns

The seventh USS Niagara (CMc-2/PG-52/AGP-1) was an auxiliary ship of the United States Navy during World War II.

Niagara was laid down on 14 November 1928 as the steel-hulled civilian yacht Hi-Esmaro by the Bath Iron Works, Maine, launched on 7 June 1929, and delivered on 20 August. She was purchased by the Navy on 16 October 1940 from Mrs. Hiram Edward Manville of New York City. Converted to a coastal minelayer at the New York Navy Yard, and designated CMc-2 on 31 October 1940, the ship was renamed Niagara, on 12 November 1940, and reclassified as a patrol gunboat, PG-52 on 15 November 1940. She commissioned at New York on 20 January 1941.

== Service history ==
=== Caribbean ===
Niagara got underway from New York on 4 February 1941 to tend units of Motor Torpedo Boat Squadron 2 operating between Miami and Key West, Florida, and Guantanamo Bay, Cuba. She departed Key West on 20 March 1941 for repairs at New York and operations at the Naval Torpedo Station, Newport, Rhode Island during the summer.

=== Pacific ===
Niagara stood out from New York on 30 August 1941 en route to Hawaii, via Guantanamo Bay, the Panama Canal, and San Diego, arriving at Pearl Harbor on 9 October to patrol on the Hawaiian Sea Frontier. On 29 November she departed Pearl as a unit of the escort of the Pensacola Convoy bound for the Philippines. She was at sea with the convoy approaching Fiji Islands when the Japanese attacked Pearl Harbor. The gunboat then returned to Pearl on 15 December, serving as tender to units of Motor Torpedo Boat Squadron 1 until 1 April 1942.

She then escorted a convoy to San Diego en route Coco Solo, Panama Canal Zone, where she tended torpedo boats and helped to guard the approaches to the Panama Canal. During an overhaul in the New York Navy Yard in the summer, she fitted out to serve at Newport, Rhode Island, as a school ship for a training squadron of motor torpedo boats.

She headed for the Southwest Pacific on 27 November via the Panama Canal and the Society Islands. En route, on 13 January 1943 Niagara was reclassified as the Navy's first motor torpedo boat tender and redesignated AGP-1. Niagara arrived at Nouméa, New Caledonia on 17 January 1943 and began tending Motor Torpedo Boat Division 23, Squadron 8. She sailed with the division on the 27th and reached her base at Tulagi, Solomon Islands on 17 February. In the ensuing months, she tended the motor torpedo boats running security patrols off Guadalcanal.

=== Attacked at Tulagi ===
On 7 April the Japanese raided the Guadalcanal-Tulagi area with 177 planes, of which about 25 were shot down. Two bombs sank the New Zealand corvette HMNZS Moa. Niagara, in the thick of the fight, was north of the harbor, moored to the west bank of the Maliali River, heading downstream with minesweeper Rail (AM-26) tied up outboard well aft. Nine enemy planes came up the river, none of them over 150 feet above the water. Niagara and Rail took them all under fire.

The first plane, already aflame, crashed into trees about 1,000 yards astern of Niagara. The next two planes escaped, but the fourth rapidly lost altitude in a stream of white smoke to explode behind the hills to the north. The following two raiders passed within 150 yards and attempted to strafe the ship, but their firing was erratic and they wobbled uncertainly as they passed through Niagara's heavy fire before crashing into the woods off her port quarter The next two planes sheared up and to the right when taken under fire. One trailed light brown smoke as it disappeared close over the hilltops abaft Niagara's port beam. The other passed to starboard and crashed in the hills on her starboard quarter.

=== Sinking of Niagara ===
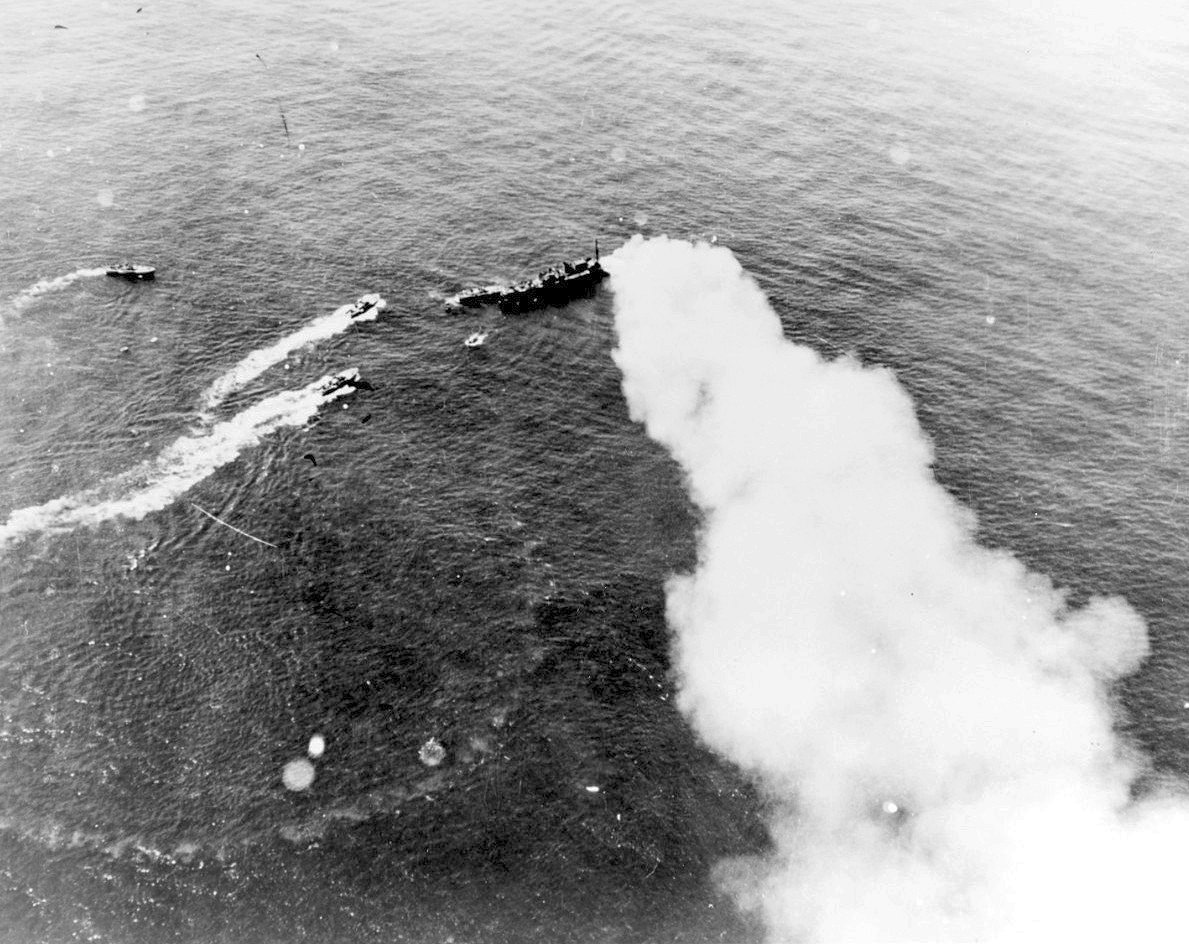
Niagara sinking on 23 May 1943.

On 22 May Niagara, with Motor Torpedo Boat Division 23, departed Tulagi headed towards New Guinea. The following morning a high-flying Japanese twin-engined monoplane attacked with four bombs. The ship made a tight starboard turn at maximum speed until the bombs were released, then swung ship hard to port. Three near-misses to starboard and one to port damaged Niagara's sound gear and the training mechanism of one 3 inch gun and knocked out steering control temporarily. Half an hour later, when steering control had been regained, six more highflying twin-engine planes dropped a pattern of over a dozen bombs. One hit directly on Niagara's forecastle and several were damaging near-misses.

Water rushing through a 14 in (360 mm) hole 6 ft (1.8 m) below her waterline flooded two storerooms, a passageway, and her engine room. All power and lighting failed, and her main engines stopped. Fire below decks forward was out of control, and Niagara listed rapidly to port. Her main engine and steering control were restored 7 minutes after the attack. But her increasing list and imminent danger of explosion of her gasoline storage tanks necessitated the order to "abandon ship."

PT–146 and PT–147 came alongside her stern to take off some of Niagara's crew. Others went over her side into rafts and boats to be picked up by other motor torpedo boats. Niagara was then ablaze from bow to bridge. Flames were spreading aft, and ammunition was exploding on deck. Yet, despite her damage, not one of Niagara's 136 officers and men was killed or seriously wounded.

PT–147 launched a torpedo which struck Niagara in the gasoline tanks. She exploded with a sheet of flame 300 ft (91 m) high, and went down in less than a minute. The motor torpedo boats landed her crew at Tulagi early the next morning.

== Awards ==
Niagara received one battle star for World War II service.
