= MV Emilia =

History

Commonwealth of the Philippines
- Name: Emilia
- Owner: La Naviera Filipina Inc
- Builder: Hua Hin Company, Cebu City
- Launched: 1931
- Home port: Cebu City, Cebu, Philippines
- Fate: Sunk by gunfire, March 1942
- Notes: Call sign: KZAG

General characteristics
- Type: passenger/cargo ship
- Tonnage: 278 GRT
- Length: 142 ft 5 in (43.41 m) registry length
- Beam: 25 ft 6 in (7.77 m)
- Draft: 11 ft 5 in (3.48 m)
- Installed power: 70 nhp
- Propulsion: oil engines

MV Emilia was a passenger/cargo ship that operated in the intracoastal waterways of the Commonwealth of the Philippines. She was sunk in March 1942 by a Japanese destroyer.

== History ==
The Emilia was built in 1931 at the Cebu City shipyard of Hua Hin Company for the benefit of La Naviera Filipina Inc. She operated in the intracoastal waterways of the Philippines until the advent of World War II. In late February 1942, after the SS Coast Farmer arrived in the Bay of Gingoog, off the coast of Anakan, Mindanao with a load of munitions and food, the Emilia along with fellow coasters Agustina and Cegostina, were dispatched to Cebu City where a load of baled rubber and tin was being warehouse. The stock had previously belonged to the cargo ship Admiral Y.S. Williams which had grounded herself immediately before the war began. After the Coast Farmer completed unloading her inventory onto the coasters Lepus and Elcano, who then departed for Manila, Emilia, Agustina, and Cegostina came alongside and offloaded their stock of rubber and tin. The three ships were then dispatched to the nearby port of Bugo in Macajalar Bay to take on a stock of locally produced food for the relief of Bataan. Unfortunately, a Japanese destroyer was nearby and upon sighting the three ships, destroyed them successively with gunfire.
