= Pacific Steamship Company =

Shipping company in Washington, Oregon, California and Alaska

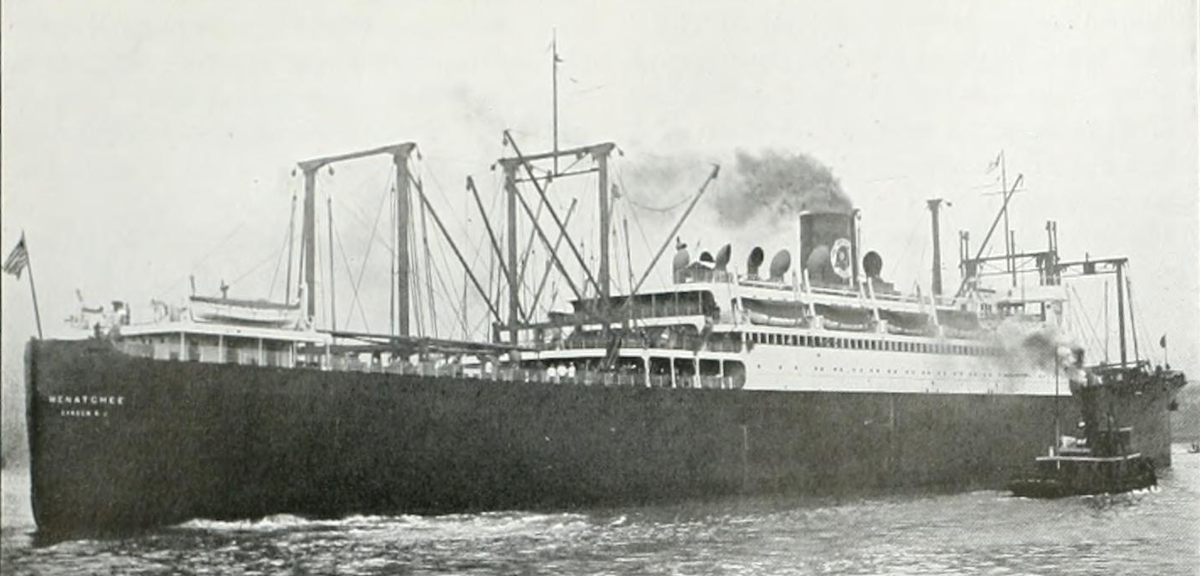
The Pacific Steamship Company ship Wenatchee in Seattle Harbor

The Pacific Steamship Company was a US freight and passenger shipping company that operated between 1916 and 1936. The company was formed by the merger of the Pacific Coast Steamship Company and the Pacific-Alaska Navigation Company and was a direct competitor to the Alaska Steamship Company in the Alaska-Seattle shipping business. Pacific Steamship Co. owned and operated The Admiral Line and The Admiral Oriental Line. American Mail Line worked with the Admiral Oriental Line.

== Pacific Lighterage Company ==
Cargo ship SS Admiral Halstead

Pacific Steamship Company also operated its subsidiary, acquired in 1927, the Pacific Lighterage Company founded in 1917. Pacific Steamship Company acquired the 101.5-foot SS Warrior II on December 21, 1917, The Warrior II was a passenger ship built by the Wilmington Transportation Company and designed by William Muller. Warrior II route was from Los Angeles to Santa Catalina Island, which she did for sixteen years. Warrior II was sold on July 24, 1930, to Pacific Motorship Company. Pacific Lighterage Company operated the Tugboat Warrior and two sealed steel barges from San Francisco to Alaska starting in 1917, the Lighterage in the name, a lighter is a barge. Durning World War II the Pacific Lighterage Company operated the ship SS Admiral Y.S. Williams. On the SS Admiral Y.S. Williams crew sank the ship to avoid capture on Dec. 25, 1941. Of the crew 29 went into Japanese Prisoner of war camp, and four died as POW.

Pacific Lighterage Companyfleet of ships that were used to help the World War II effort. During World War II Pacific Lighterage Company operated Merchant navy ships for the United States Shipping Board. During World War II Pacific Lighterage Company was active with charter shipping with the Maritime Commission and War Shipping Administration. ship for the merchant navy. The ship was run by its Pacific Lighterage Company crew and the US Navy supplied United States Navy Armed Guards to man the deck guns and radio.

- Ships:
- SS Ammiral Cole, Pacific Lighterage as the operator from Feb. 26, 1942, until July 1942, then turned over to the Soviet Union under the Lend-lease Act.
- SS Admiral Y.S. Williams, Japanese took on Dec. 25, 1941 at Hong Kong, became Tatsutama Maru.
- SS Admiral Halstead, United States Army charter with Pacific Lighterage as operator.

== Admiral Oriental Line services ==
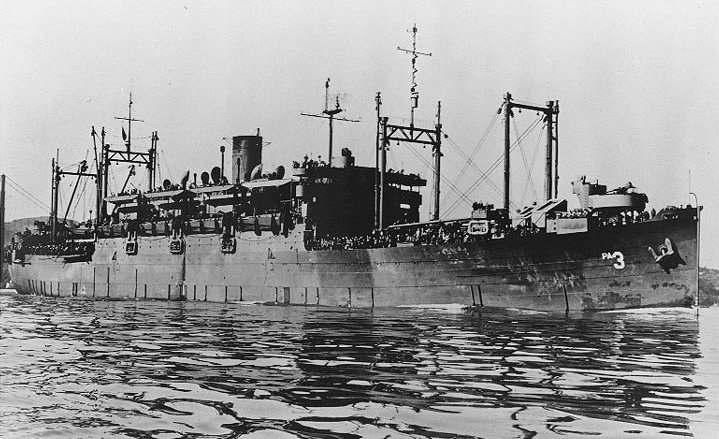
SS President Jackson

Regular Passenger and mail service ships in 1923 and 1936, from the Admiral Oriental Line:

- President Jackson
- President Jefferson
- SS Pine Tree State
- President Madison (American ocean liner in service 1922–1938)
- President McKinley

Regular service ports of call in 1923 and 1936: Seattle, Seattle, Victoria, Yokohama, Kobe, Shanghai, Hong Kong, Manila.

== See also ==
- World War II United States Merchant Navy
