= SS Admiral Sampson =

American-flagged cargo and passenger steamship

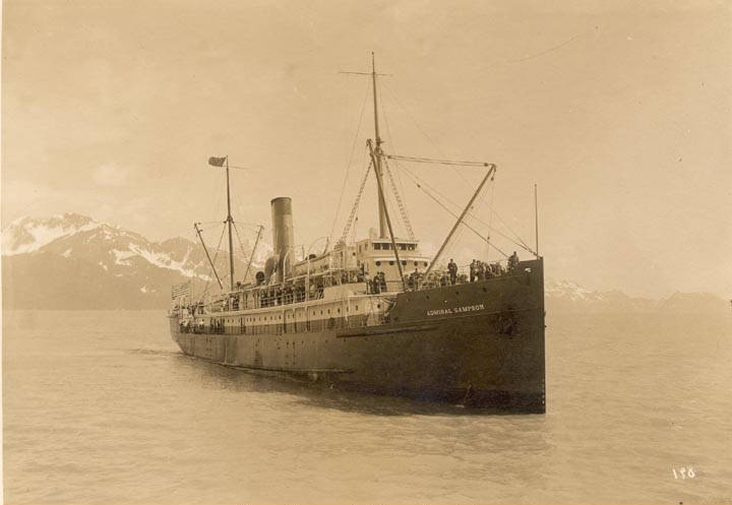
- Admiral Sampson in Resurrection Bay, offshore of Seward, Alaska, some time between 1898 and 1913.

History
- Name: Admiral Sampson
- Owner: American Mail Steamship Company (1898–1906); Alaska Pacific Steamship Company (1906–1912); Pacific-Alaska Navigation Company (1912–1914)
- Port of registry: United States
- Builder: William Cramp & Sons, Philadelphia
- Yard number: 297
- Launched: September 27, 1898
- Completed: 1898
- In service: 1898
- Out of service: 1914
- Identification: Code Letters and radio callsign KNSB
- Fate: Sank as a result of being rammed on August 26, 1914, in Puget Sound

General characteristics
- Class & type: Admiral-class steamship
- Tonnage: 2,262 GRT; 1,432 NRT
- Length: 280.0 ft (85.3 m)
- Beam: 36.1 ft (11.0 m)
- Depth: 22.7 ft (6.9 m)
- Installed power: 2,500 hp (1,900 kW)

SS Admiral Sampson was a U.S.-flagged cargo and passenger steamship that served three owners between 1898 and 1914, when it was rammed by a Canadian passenger liner and sank in Puget Sound. Following its sinking off Point No Point, Admiral Sampson has become a notable scuba diving destination for advanced recreational divers certified to use rebreathing equipment.

== Construction and description ==
Admiral Sampson was one of several Admiral-class steamships built by William Cramp & Sons Shipbuilding Company in Philadelphia, Pennsylvania for the American Mail Steamship Company. Named in honor of the United States Navy Admiral William T. Sampson, the other ships in the class were Admiral Dewey, Admiral Schley, and Admiral Farragut. Admiral Sampson was a steel-hulled, twin-propeller design with two upper decks constructed of wood, and a single smokestack.

== Service history ==
Ordered by the American Mail Steamship Company, the vessel was put in the service of the United Fruit Company and made regular trips between Philadelphia and Caribbean Sea ports. In February 1900, Admiral Sampson came to the rescue of the United States Army transport ship McPherson, which was disabled by a broken propeller shaft off Hampton Roads, Virginia. On November 4, 1902 Admiral Sampson sank the cargo schooner Charlie Bucki in a collision in Massachusetts Bay in dense fog. Charlie Bucki's captain and three crewmen were killed.

In 1909, the Alaska Pacific Steamship Company acquired Admiral Sampson and its sister ship, Admiral Farragut, as a result of its growing business on the West Coast shipping routes. Both ships were placed on the San Francisco–Puget Sound shipping route. In 1912, the Alaska Pacific Steamship Company acquired the remaining Admiral-class steamships and merged with the Alaska Coast Company to form the Pacific-Alaska Navigation Company. The new company offered freight and passenger service between San Francisco and Puget Sound and Alaska ports as far north as Nome.

=== Collision and sinking ===
On the morning of August 26, 1914, Admiral Sampson left Seattle, Washington, en route to Juneau, Alaska, with 126 passengers and crew aboard. Visibility was poor because of fog; the ship's captain, Zimro Moore, ordered a slow crawl of 3 knots (5.6 km/h; 3.5 mph), extra lookouts and the ship's whistle sounded at regular intervals. At the same time, the steamship Princess Victoria was inbound to Seattle with similar precautions in place.

Despite both ships' precautions, Princess Victoria rammed Admiral Sampson at approximately 5:46 a.m. near Point No Point, 18 miles (29 km) north of Seattle. Princess Victoria struck Admiral Sampson broadside, near Admiral Sampson's after hatch, a spot about midway between amidships and the ship's stern. Capt. P. J. Hickey of Princess Victoria kept his ship's engines ahead and pushed Princess Victoria into the gash torn into the hull of Admiral Sampson. This action both reduced the amount of water rushing into the hole and allowed some of Admiral Sampson's passengers and crew to evacuate onto Princess Victoria.

Princess Victoria's crew lowered their ship's lifeboats to aid Admiral Sampson's passengers and crew, as it was apparent that the latter ship was sinking. Captain Moore ordered the same action aboard Admiral Sampson, but only two boats could be lowered in time. Moore ordered that his passengers be dropped overboard for pickup by the lifeboats. He ordered the crew off the ship and said he would stay with the ship.

In addition to tearing a gash that stretched below Admiral Sampson's waterline, the impact of Princess Victoria ruptured an oil tank aboard Admiral Sampson and started a fire. Princess Victoria was forced to pull away and the Admiral Sampson sank, about 15 minutes after the collision. All told, 114 passengers and crew members were saved. Eight crew members, including Capt. Moore, and three passengers drowned. One injured crew member died later in a hospital.

== Casualties ==
The wireless operators of both ships transmitted SOS signals constantly. Aboard Admiral Sampson, wireless operator Walter E. Reker transmitted emergency messages and helped passengers board lifeboats; he then joined his captain on the bridge. Reker and Captain Moore went down with the ship. Reker's name was added to the Wireless Operators Memorial in New York City's Battery Park. The Wireless World reported in April 1915: "As the cargo of his vessel consisted of oil, the horrors of fire were super-added to the situation and Reker found too much work to do to think of his own safety. He shared the fate of the captain side by side with him on the bridge."

Telegraph and Telephone Age reported on May 16, 1915: "It is proof of the bravery and efficiency of the crew that [most] passengers were saved. Reker might have saved himself by taking to the boats with the passengers and the greater part of the crew. He remained at the wireless telegraph key, however, giving direction to the rescuing ship which proved invaluable. He ignored repeated appeals from the boats to save himself. When the last boat had left safely, Reker reported to the bridge and remained to share the fate of the captain. It proved to be too late for them to leave and eight of the men, including the wireless telegraph operator, went down with the ship."

A large crowd met Princess Victoria when it reached the Canadian Pacific Railroad wharf shortly after 10 a.m. Princess Victoria had a gash two or three feet (0.61 or 0.91 m) above the waterline, extending 20 feet (6.1 m) back from the bow.

"Her decks were crowded with people, half of them well-dressed and the other half with only fragments of clothing protecting them from the cold," the Seattle Star reported. "A gaping wound loomed large in the vessel's bow, only two or three feet above the water line … In the breech hung a battered hatch cover from the Admiral Sampson."

== Salvage ==
The wreck of Admiral Sampson remained undisturbed for 80 years, owing to its depth and the difficulty of a salvage operation. In 1991, two divers used side-scan sonar to locate Admiral Sampson's resting place. The following year, the two men obtained exclusive salvage rights for the ship. They began diving on the wreck with a small, two-man submarine and retrieved artifacts, including the ship's whistle.

The wreck rests about 320 feet (98 m) below the surface of Puget Sound, directly under a major shipping route. The hull lies in two pieces, having broken apart either as it sank or shortly after it hit bottom. In 1994, the two men expressed hopes that they might find the ship's safe, which was believed to contain a valuable diamond necklace. Another potential prize was a suitcase containing gold brought aboard by a passenger. The search failed to discover the safe, but the salvagers did recover the ship's engine order telegraph and various galley equipment.

Since the pioneering dives in the early 1990s, Admiral Sampson has become a destination for a handful of technically advanced and experienced divers. Owing to its depth and location, it is believed that fewer than 15 divers visited Admiral Sampson before 2005. Diving Admiral Sampson remains a highly technical and involved experience. Owing to its location in Puget Sound shipping lanes, coordination with the United States Coast Guard is required.
