= SS Princess Victoria =

Ocean liner (1902–1953)

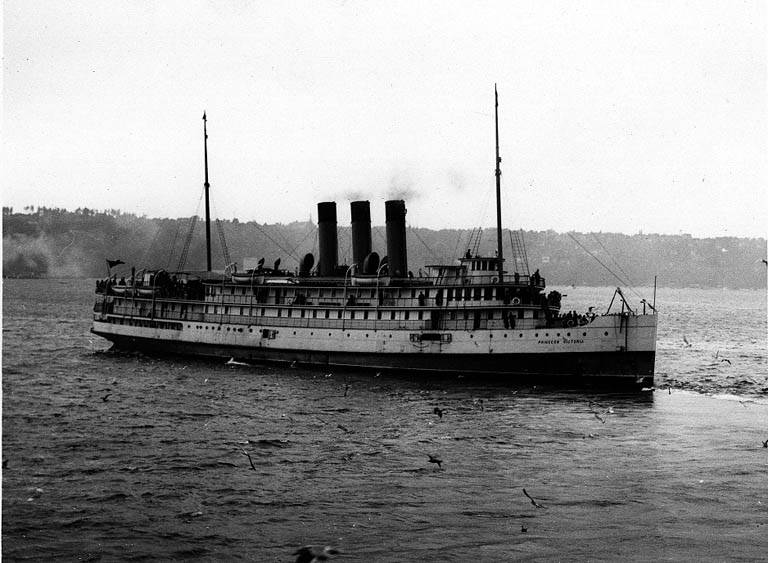

History

Canada
- Name: SS Princess Victoria; Tahsis No. 3
- Operator: Canadian Pacific Railway
- Route: Victoria, Vancouver and Seattle
- Builder: CS Swan & Hunter, Wallsend, Newcastle on Tyne, England
- Launched: 18 November 1902
- Fate: Sank 10 March 1953

General characteristics
- Type: Passenger steamship; later bulk oil carrier
- Tonnage: 1,943 GRT
- Length: 300 feet (91 m)
- Beam: 40.5 feet (12.3 m)

SS Princess Victoria was a luxury passenger ship built in 1902 and operated by the Canadian Pacific Railway. Subsequently, converted into a bulk oil carrier under the name Tahsis No. 3, the ship struck a rock and sank on 10 March 1953.

Princess Victoria was built in Wallsend, Newcastle upon Tyne, England, by the shipyards of CS Swan & Hunter Company. She was 300 feet (91 m) long, with a beam of 40.5 feet, 1,943 gross register tons and three smokestacks. Christened on 18 November 1902, she arrived in Victoria, British Columbia on 28 March 1903. While the ship burned coal when it was built, Princess Victoria was converted to oil fuel in 1912. During her time in Victoria, Princess Victoria ran routes between Victoria, Vancouver and Seattle, Washington.

Princess Victoria was involved in a major accident on 26 August 1914, when she rammed and sank SS Admiral Sampson in Puget Sound during heavy fog.

Laid up in 1950, Princess Victoria was sold to Tahsis & Company of Vancouver in November 1951 and converted into a bulk oil carrier named Tahsis No. 3. Shortly after the conversion, the ship struck a rock on 10 March 1953 and sank in Welcome Pass, a narrow passageway north of Vancouver, British Columbia.

After its sinking, it was broken up at the Victoria Capital Iron Works and its engine room, telegraph, and steering were re-purposed for the MV Uchuck III which still runs today.
