= Alaska Pacific Steamship Company =

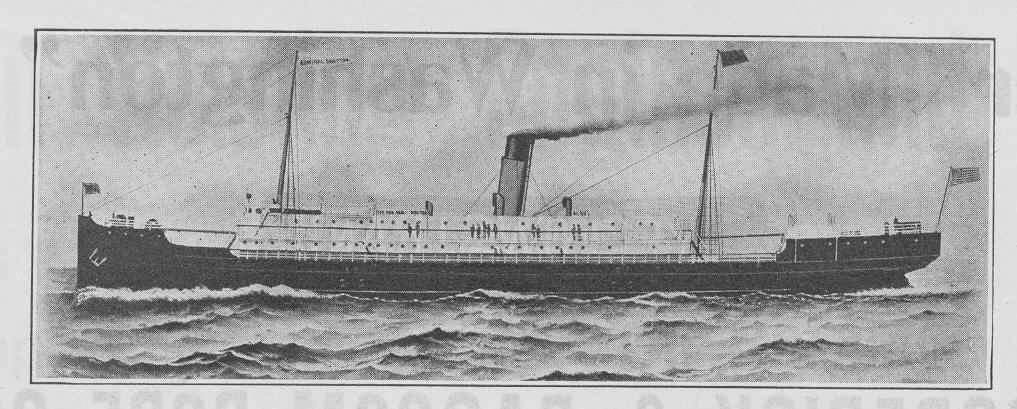
A ship of the Alaska Pacific Steamship Company, Puget Sound San Francisco Route - $1500 First Class, $1000 Second Class

The Alaska Pacific Steamship Company was a short-lived freight and passenger shipping line that operated on the West Coast of North America between 1906 and 1912. The company was created by E.E. Caine, who used the steamships Buckman and Watson on the route between Seattle, Tacoma, and San Francisco. The following year, Caine's partners in the company took over management of the Alaska Coast Company, which operated the steamships Jeanie and Portland. In 1909, Alaska Pacific acquired the twin-propeller steamships Admiral Farragut and Admiral Sampson from the American Mail Steamship Company on the East Coast. In 1912, Alaska Pacific acquired the remaining Admiral-class steamships Admiral Dewey and Admiral Schley from American Mail. Before the end of the year, the company's directors decided to merge Alaska Pacific with Alaska Coast Company to form the new Pacific-Alaska Navigation Company.
