= SS Suremico =

Design 1023 cargo ship

History

United States
- Name: Suremico (1920–1930); Nisqually (1930–1941)
- Namesake: William H. Remick
- Owner: USSB (1920–1930); Pioneer Transportation (1930–1941)
- Builder: Submarine Boat Corporation, Newark
- Yard number: 139
- Laid down: 24 February 1920
- Launched: 17 September 1920
- Completed: October 1920
- Identification: US Official Number 220694; code letters: MBQR
- Fate: Sunk by enemy aircraft, 8 December 1941

General characteristics
- Type: Design 1023 Cargo ship
- Tonnage: 3,658 GRT; 5,075 DWT; 2,214 NRT
- Length: 324.0 ft (98.8 m) registry length
- Beam: 46.2 ft (14.1 m)
- Draft: 25 ft (7.6 m)
- Depth: 25.0 ft (7.6 m)
- Installed power: 386 NHP
- Propulsion: 2 oil fired boilers, steam turbine, single screw propeller; 4 Bayles vessels: triple expansion steam engine
- Speed: 10.5 kn (19.4 km/h; 12.1 mph)
- Range: 10,080 nmi (18,670 km; 11,600 mi)

Suremico was a Design 1023 cargo ship built for the United States Shipping Board (USSB) immediately after World War I. She was later named the Nisqually and converted into a barge and later a scow. She was bombed and sunk during the Battle of Wake Island.

== History ==
She was laid down at yard number 139 at the Newark, New Jersey shipyard of the Submarine Boat Corporation (SBC), one of 132 Design 1023 cargo ships built for the United States Shipping Board (there were 154 ships of the class built in total). She was launched on 17 September 1920, completed in October 1920, and named the SS Suremico. She was named after William H. Remick, former president of the New York Stock Exchange (her name being a portmanteau of her manufacturer and her namesake, SUbmarine Boat REMIck COrporation). On June 3, 1927, while en route from Vancouver to Seattle with a load of lumber, she was involved in a collision in heavy fog with the French cargo ship SS Arkansas near the entrance to Strait of Juan de Fuca off Cape Flattery Light. The USRC Snohomish, HMCS Malaspina, and the Pacific Salvage Company's Salvage King out of Victoria, British Columbia rushed to provide assistance. Both ships were so heavily damaged that the Arkansas required towage to Seattle and the USSB deemed the Suremico a total loss; and rather than repair her, the USSB removed her equipment and engines for the use of other ships in the fleet. In 1930, her hull was purchased by Pioneer Transportation Company, renamed Nisqually, and converted into a barge. In 1937, she was converted into a scow.

On 8 December 1941, she was bombed and sunk by Japanese planes during the Battle of Wake Island.

== Bibliography ==
- McKellar, Norman L. "Steel Shipbuilding under the U. S. Shipping Board, 1917-1921, Part III, Contract Steel Ships" (PDF). Steel Shipbuilding under the U. S. Shipping Board, 1917-1921. ShipScribe.
- "1920 Construction Record of U.S. Yards". The Marine Review. 51 (February). New York: 100. 1921.
