= Bayles Shipyard =

- U.S. National Register of Historic Places
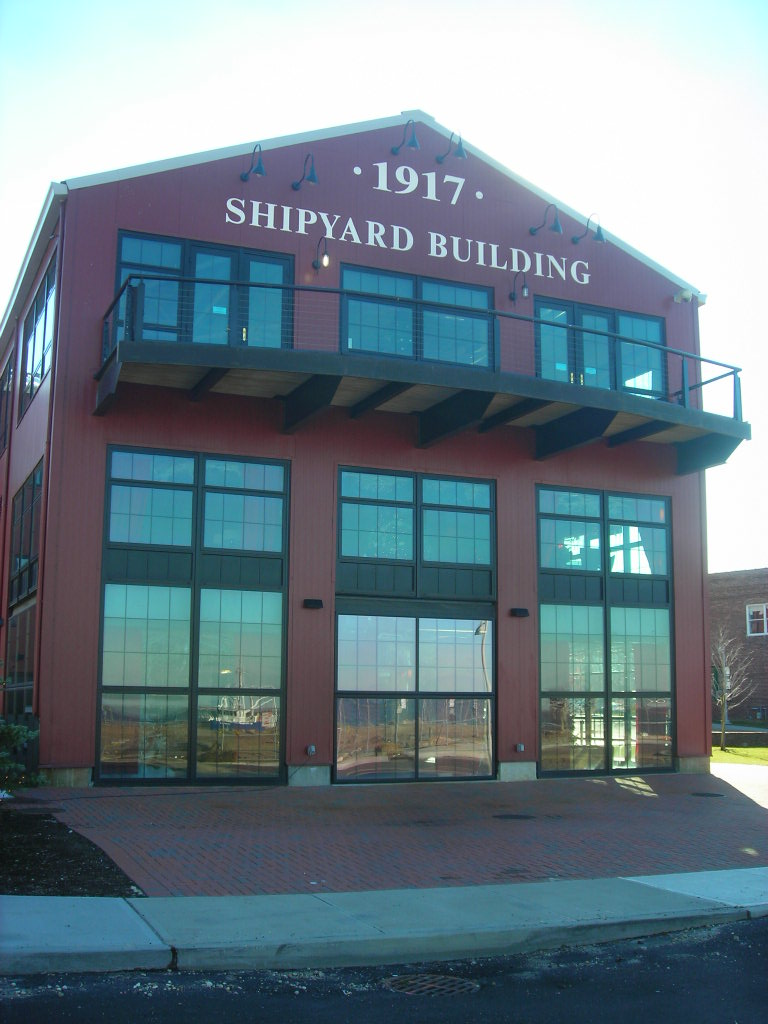
- 1917 Machine Shop and Mould Loft, December 2007

- Location within New York Location within the United States
- Location: 101 E. Broadway, Port Jefferson, New York
- Coordinates: 40°56′54″N 73°4′5″W
- Area: 2.2 acres (0.89 ha)
- Built: 1897
- Architectural style: Queen Anne, Industrial Shed
- NRHP reference No.: 00000580
- Added to NRHP: June 2, 2000

Bayles Shipyard is a historic shipyard located at Port Jefferson in Suffolk County, New York. It includes the 1897 Bayles Chandlery, the 1917 Machine Shop and Mould Loft and the 1917 Compressor House. The vicinity also contained a Mobil Oil Terminal.

It was added to the National Register of Historic Places in 2000. The machine shop and mould loft is currently used as the Port Jefferson Village Center. The former Mobil Oil terminal was converted into the Jeanne Garant Harborfront Park in 2004.
