= Pensacola Convoy =

The Pensacola Convoy is a colloquialism for a United States military shipping convoy that took place in late 1941 as the Pacific War began. The name was derived from that of its primary escort ship, the heavy cruiser USS Pensacola. Pensacola was officially designated Task Group 15.5 and Army sources may use the term Republic convoy for the senior convoy vessel. The convoy, dispatched in peacetime, was intended to reinforce the United States Army Forces Far East (USAFFE), created to defend the U.S. Commonwealth of the Philippines and commanded by General Douglas MacArthur, with artillery, aircraft, munitions and fuel, as the threat of war with the Empire of Japan loomed. After war broke out, and Japanese forces attacked the Philippines, the convoy was diverted to Brisbane, Australia.

== Background ==
On 16 August 1941, the War Department approved large-scale reinforcement of the Philippines. General MacArthur was notified that the first units would sail in September. When Chief of Staff George C. Marshall asked MacArthur if he needed a National Guard division for USAFFE, MacArthur declined, stating: "Equipment and supply of existing forces are the prime essential. I am confident if these steps are taken with sufficient speed, that no further major reinforcement will be necessary for accomplishment of the defense mission." Marshall replied: "I have directed that United States Army Forces in the Philippines be placed in highest priority for equipment ... (and) ... men." Reinforcement convoys began in September and continued through November 1941, escorted from Pearl Harbor, Territory of Hawaii, by naval vessels.

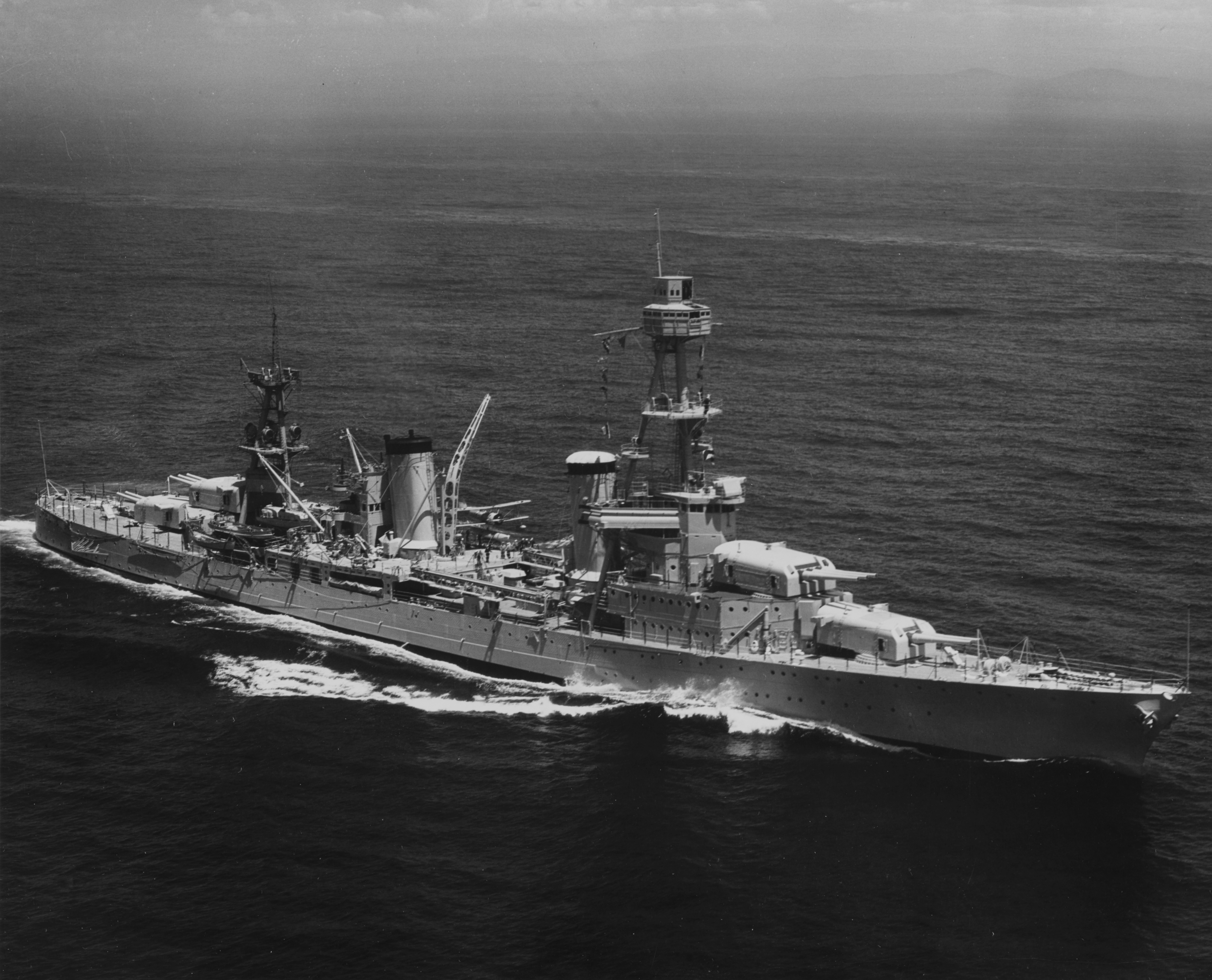
USS Pensacola

Pensacola's convoy included the gunboat USS Niagara; the U.S. Navy transports USS Republic and USS Chaumont; the U.S. Army transport ships USAT Willard A. Holbrook (Note: Holbrook, 1921, 12,562 GRT (Lloyd's 1940–41) ex President Taft, ex Buckeye State acquired by the Army June 1941, attempted to deliver supplies and elements of field artillery units to the Philippines after reloading in Australia, but was turned back and delivered them to Darwin instead. (Masterson, 1949, pages 8–9)) and USAT Meigs; the U.S. merchant ships Admiral Halstead and Coast Farmer; and the Dutch merchant ship Bloemfontein. (Note: Bloemfontein, built 1934, was a motor ship of 10,081 tons that was reloaded in Australia and went on to Surabaya, Java, arriving 5 January 1942 with cargo and field artillery personnel and equipment (See Aftermath below). (Masterson, 1949, page 9). Other references indicate the ship had been used for earlier military movements, including taking elements of the AVG (Flying Tigers) to Burma (Ford, 1991, Flying Tigers: Claire Chennault and his American Volunteers, 1941–1942, page 86), and, as the Dutch had been at war some time, was armed (Williford, 2010 in Racing the Sunrise—Reinforcing America's Pacific Outposts 1941–1942, page 163).)

The convoy was carrying a provisional field artillery brigade, made up of 2,000 National Guard troops:

- HQ and HQ Battery, 26th Field Artillery Brigade (Regular Army)
  - 2nd Battalion, 131st Field Artillery Regiment (Texas National Guard)
  - 1st and 2nd Battalions, 147th Field Artillery Regiment (South Dakota National Guard)
  - 1st Battalion, 148th Field Artillery Regiment (Idaho National Guard)

2,600 U. S. Army Air Forces personnel were also on board, along with aircraft shipped disassembled in crates: Fifty-two Douglas A-24 dive bombers of the 27th Bombardment Group (Light) sent on the Meigs. Eighteen crated Curtiss P-40 fighter planes of the 35th Pursuit Group (Interceptor) on the Bloemfontein. Forty eight pilots of the 35th Pursuit Group traveled on the Republic and thirty-nine newly graduated but unassigned pilots were aboard the Holbrook.

Materiel transported included: 20 75 mm field artillery pieces, AA ammunition, 2,000 500 lb bombs, 3,000 30 lb bombs, 340 motor vehicles, 9,000 barrels of aviation fuel, 500,000 rounds of .50 caliber ammunition and 9,600 rounds of 37 mm anti-aircraft shells.

== Convoy ==
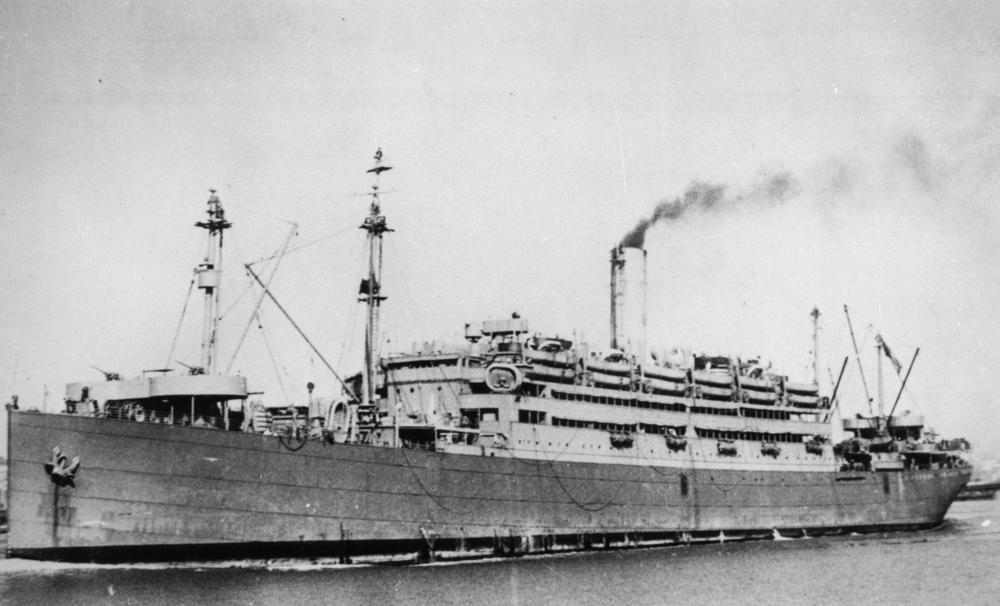
USS Republic entering Brisbane as part of the convoy

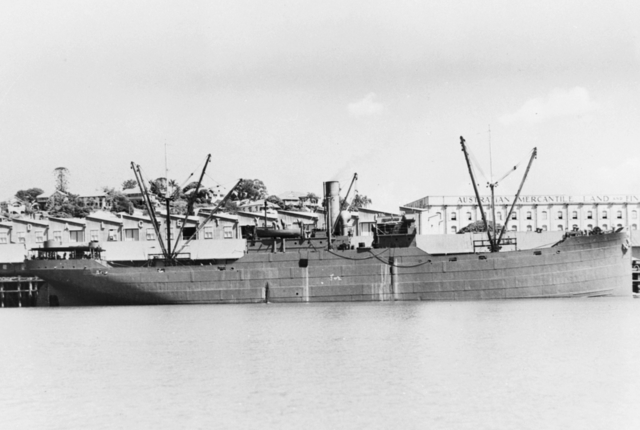
The merchant Coast Farmer, built in 1920.

The ships left San Francisco individually and arrived at Pearl Harbor, Hawaii on 27 November to form the convoy. It sailed for Manila on 29 November by an indirect, southerly route. On 7 December, after news of the attack on Pearl Harbor reached the convoy, the crews and soldiers on board began to cover the civilian paint schemes of the ships with gray paint. Extra lookouts were posted to watch for Japanese planes, submarines and surface ships. All personnel were ordered to wear life jackets and carry full canteens of water, and life rafts were installed on deck. Japanese forces landed in the Philippines on 8 December and the convoy was ordered to put in at Suva, Fiji while its destination was debated.

It became clear over the following hours that the Japanese were rapidly overcoming Allied resistance in the Philippines and many other parts of Southeast Asia. On 9 December, at a meeting of the Joint Board, the chief planners of the respective services, Brigadier General Leonard T. Gerow and Rear Admiral Richmond K. Turner agreed that the convoy should be recalled immediately. Turner wanted it to reinforce Pearl Harbor. Gerow agreed and added that if the convoy was not sent back to Hawaii, it should be brought back to the continental United States.

The Pensacola convoy was also discussed in a meeting at the White House the following day, and Roosevelt suggested that the materiel should be delivered to the Southwest Pacific. He referred the matter back to the Joint Board, which decided at a meeting that same day to send the convoy to Brisbane, Australia by way of Suva, Fiji. The convoy reached Suva on 12 December with Australian warships being dispatched the same date to cover the convoy's final approach. The cruisers HMAS Canberra and HMAS Perth left Sydney for Brisbane where on the 15th Rear-Admiral J.G. Crace hoisted his flag in Canberra and departed for the New Caledonia vicinity to be joined by the light cruiser HMNZS Achilles.

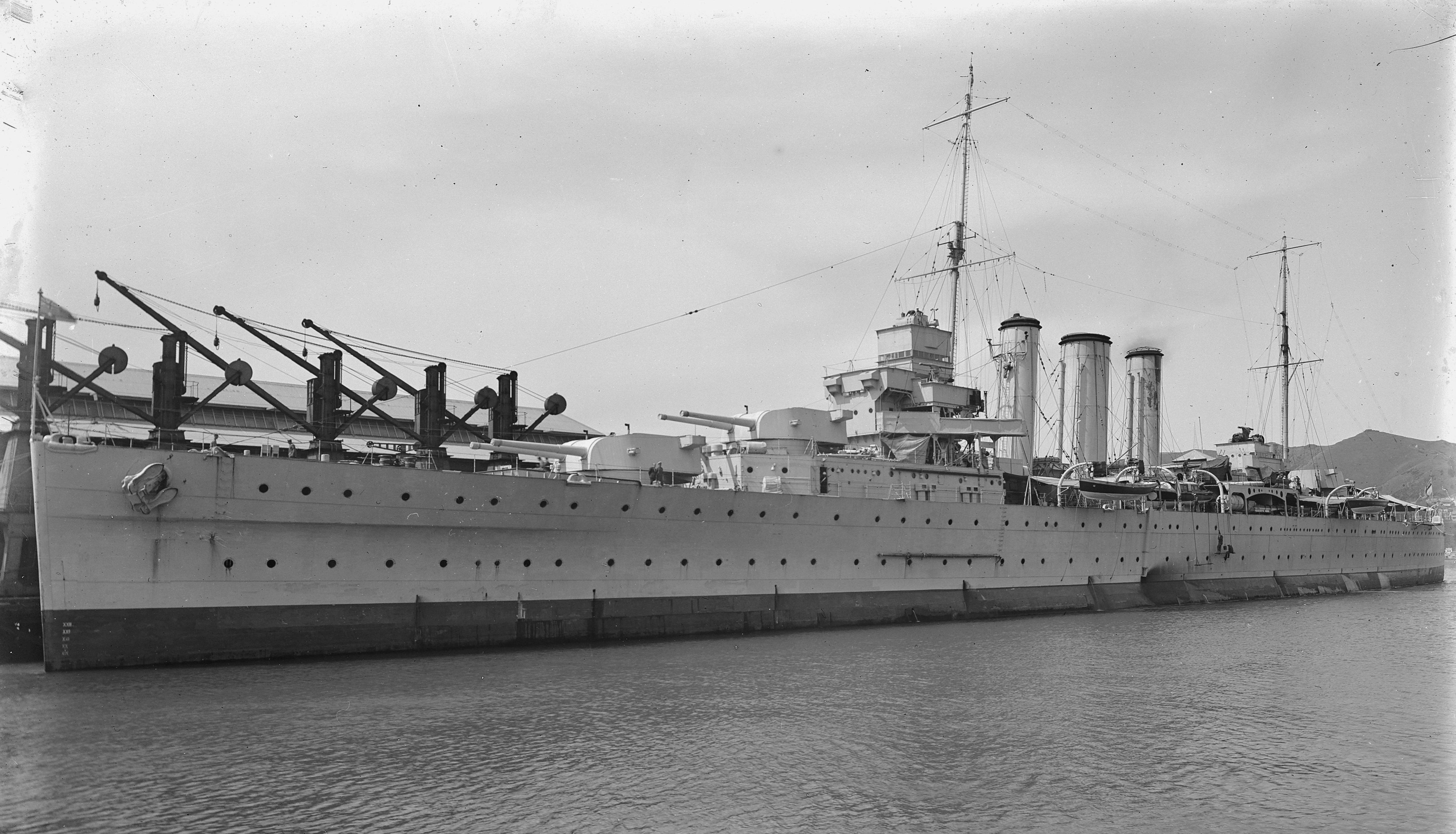
Heavy cruiser HMAS Canberra

The convoy then sailed from Fiji in a zigzag course, at a speed set by the slowest ship. To ensure that the rations on board lasted, the soldiers now received only two daily meals. On 19 December in the vicinity of New Caledonia the convoy escort was augmented by HMAS Canberra, HMAS Perth and HMNZS Achilles. On 21 December 1941 land based Royal Australian Air Force (RAAF) Hudsons provided anti-submarine screening later to be joined by HMAS Swan and HMAS Warrego for the final approaches to Brisbane.

Meanwhile, the staff of the commander of the U.S. Asiatic Fleet, Admiral Thomas C. Hart, considered how the convoy could make its way from Brisbane to Manila. Japanese advances in the Philippines meant that a blockade by the Imperial Japanese Navy was highly possible. Secondary plans to support Dutch and British Commonwealth forces, in the Dutch East Indies, Malaya and Singapore, faced similar difficulties. MacArthur, when advised of Hart's apprehensions, replied that the convoy could reach Manila with an appropriate naval escort and air support.

The situation changed however suddenly, on 22 December, when Japanese forces began landing in Lingayen Gulf. That same day, the convoy reached Brisbane with the additional Australian escort. It was received enthusiastically by people in Australia. This was because they were the first U.S. soldiers on Australian soil, at a time when Japanese forces were seen to threaten Australia. The strongest and only battle-hardened Australian Army units — known as the Australian Imperial Force — were involved in the North African and Malayan Campaigns. The U.S. soldiers were accommodated at Ascot Racecourse (later known as Eagle Farm) in tents, while they awaited further instructions.

It had been decided to send the most important articles of equipment by air to Manila, and General George Brett was en route to Australia to establish a supply system for reinforcing the Philippines. The airplanes sent with the convoy were assembled but no engine coolant had been provided for the fighters, and the dive bombers were without trigger motors, gunsight solenoids, and gun mounts.

The circumstances that led to the omission of these parts were found to be due to inexperience in loading and peacetime lack of standard nomenclature and practices. For example, the A-24 dive bomber trigger motors and solenoids were found to have been overlooked in unpacking, and were destroyed due to being nailed inside the packing crates and being burned with the crates. Few of the troops, who were mostly artillerymen, were familiar with general supply outside their specialties, yet were now responsible for the unexpected unloading and redistribution of cargo for retention in Australia or transshipment onward to Java and possibly the Philippines, even as they were required to begin forming a base in Australia.

The Pensacola was directed on 24 December to escort ongoing elements of her convoy as far as the Torres Strait before returning and rejoining the fleet. On 28 December, after six days of prolonged unloading because cargo had been haphazardly loaded under peacetime standards, two artillery battalions sailed on Holbrook and Bloemfontein, the two fastest ships, destined for Manila. Japanese bases established in Borneo by this time made the blockade of the Philippines effective so that most of the troops were unloaded at Darwin Australia with some sent forward to Surabaja, Java.

== Aftermath ==
The Bloemfontein with an escort composed of the cruisers USS Boise and Marblehead and destroyers Barker, Parrott, Bulmer, Stewart, and Pope departing from Darwin to Surabaya was able to transport the 2nd Battalion, 131st Field Artillery arriving Surabaya on 11 January 1942, where it joined other Allied forces. The battalion was commended for its service in the Battle of Java, during March 1942. After a general Allied surrender, most of its personnel became POWs. However, Headquarters and Headquarters Battery, 26th Field Artillery Brigade evacuated Java on 27 February 1942 and returned to Australia on 4 March 1942.

Seventeen of the eighteen P-40 fighter planes were quickly assembled, then assigned to the 17th Pursuit Squadron (Provisional), formed 15 January from pursuit pilots of the Far East Air Force sent from Luzon at the end of December 1941 to ferry the aircraft back to the Philippines. Japanese advances southward into the Netherlands East Indies cut the ferry route and isolated MacArthur's forces, however. From Brisbane on 16 January, the 17th PS flew its aircraft across northern Australia to Darwin, Northern Territory, where it remained until 24 January, when it moved via Kupang and Bali to its base on Java. On 1 March, the squadron evacuated Java, leaving its surviving aircraft to the Dutch military.

Eleven of the A-24s reached Java on 11 February, assigned to the 27th Bombardment Group's 91st Bomb Squadron. All were lost in action. Several others were later assigned to the 3rd Bombardment Group; most of these were shot down on 26 July 1942, while attacking Japanese shipping off Buna, New Guinea.

The battalions of the 147th and 148th Field Artillery Regiments on the convoy were sent to Darwin to reinforce northern Australia. The 147th units were later reorganized as the 147th and 260th Field Artillery Battalions. The 148th units became the 148th Field Artillery Battalion. Both battalions served in the Southwest Pacific.

USS Pensacola served in many notable actions of World War II; she was decommissioned on 26 August 1946.

== See also ==
- Battle of Brisbane
