= Submarine Boat Company =

Shipyard in Newark, New Jersey, United States

Coordinates: 40.692890°N 74.128704°W

Submarine Boat Company's SS Suwordenco as SS Admiral Halstead

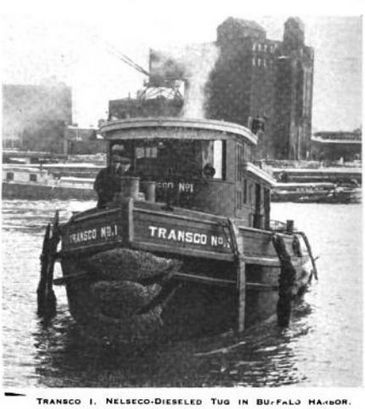
Transmarine Lines New York State Canal Tug No. 1 in Buffalo, New York Harbor in 1922.

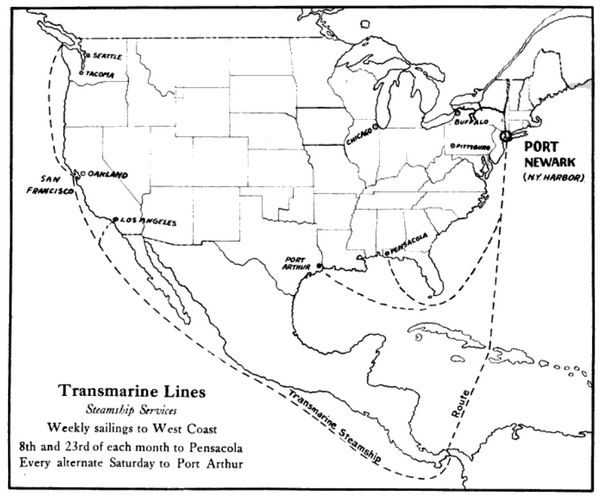
Transmarine Lines route in 1923

Submarine Boat Company (Submarine Boat Corporation) was a large-scale World War I ship manufacturing shipyard, located at Newark, New Jersey's Port of Newark. Submarine Boat Company operated as a subsidiary of the Electric Boat Company, now General Dynamics Electric Boat. Submarine Boat Company was founded in April 1915 to meet the demand for ships for World War I. Submarine Boat Corporation built the Design 1023 ships, this was a steel-hulled cargo ship. Submarine Boat Company built merchant cargo ships from 1917 to 1922. Submarine Boat Company was to able to complete ships quickly as they had other shipyards prefabricate about 80% of the hull. Submarine Boat Company worked with: Merchant Shipbuilding Corporation in Bristol, Pennsylvania, and American International Shipbuilding, in Hog Island, Philadelphia, Pennsylvania. During World War I, at its peak, the shipbuilding the company employed 25,000 people. The Submarine Boat Company received a 150 shipbuilding contract from the United States Shipping Board (USSB)'s Emergency Fleet Corporation, and 118 ships were completed before the contract was canceled. Submarine Boat Company built and sold the last 32 ships on their own for the Transmarine shipping line. After the war in 1920, Submarine Boat built 30 206-ton barges for Transmarine. With no more contracts, the shipyard closed in 1922 and the company went into receivership in 1929. For World War II the shipyard was reopened by Federal Shipbuilding and Drydock Company. Federal Shipbuilding operated its main shipyard 2.8 miles (4.5 km) north of the Submarine Boat Company shipyard, where Uncommon Carrier Inc. in Kearny, New Jersey is now located. The location of the former Submarine Boat Company shipyard is at the Toyota Logistics Services Inc. automobile terminal, 390 E. Port Street, Newark, just south of Interstate 78. Notable ships: SS Mopang, SS Admiral Halstead, SS Coast Trader and SS Coast Farmer.

While Submarine Boat Company ended shipbuilding in 1922, due to its good working with steel, in 1923 it received a construction contract from the Newton Amusement Corporation to build a 1,000-seat stadium theater. Submarine Boat Company supplied 50 tons of steel columns. This was the last project before closing.

== Background ==
The Submarine Boat Company did not build any submarines, its name was given from its parent company Electric Boat Company, which was started in 1899 by Isaac Rice. The Electric Boat Company initially built submarines based on John Philip Holland designs. (i.e. The USS Holland and the A Class.) These submarines were built at Lewis Nixon's Crescent Shipyard in Elizabeth, New Jersey. Electric Boat Company first submarine was the USS Holland, commissioned by the United States Navy on April 11, 1900, becoming the first US Navy submarine commissioned.

== Transmarine Corporation ==
Submarine Boat Company operated the Transmarine Corporation (Transco) or Transmarine Lines a shipping company from 1922 to 1930, with 32 ships and 29 barges they had built. Providing east coast, west coast, Texas, Cuba and South America with cargo shipping services. With the 206 DWT barges working on the New York State Canal System with five tugboats. Barges moved cargo from New York City to Buffalo, New York in seven to nine days.

== Atlantic Port Railway ==
The Submarine Boat Corporation incorporated, on May 4, 1920, the Atlantic Port Railway Corporation, to move cargo to and from Transmarine Lines. The company was a common carrier rail line, it owned no property right of ways. Atlantic Port Railway operated standard-gage steam railroad, at the Port Newark with rail lines that connected to the Central Railroad of New Jersey and the Pennsylvania Railroad Company to Transmarine docks. Atlantic Port Railway had about 18 miles (29 km) of tracks and 59 miles (95 km) of yard tracks and sidings.

== Submarine Boat Company ships ==
(Note if the ship as two or more names listed, this means the ship was renamed while under construction)

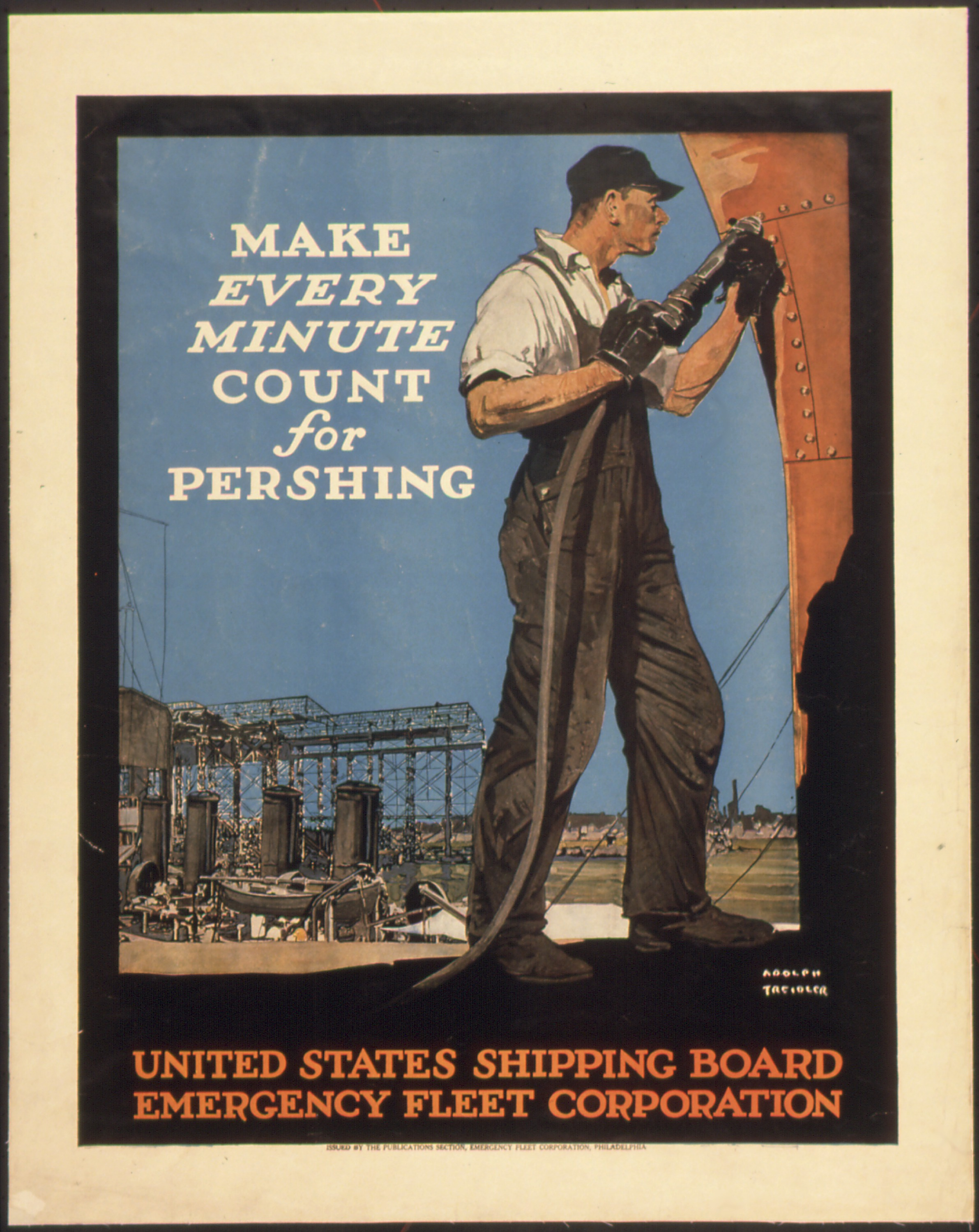
"Make Every Minute Count For Pershing", United States Shipping Board Emergency Fleet Corporation, ca. 1917–1919, poster that would have been posted at Submarine Boat Company for the workers.

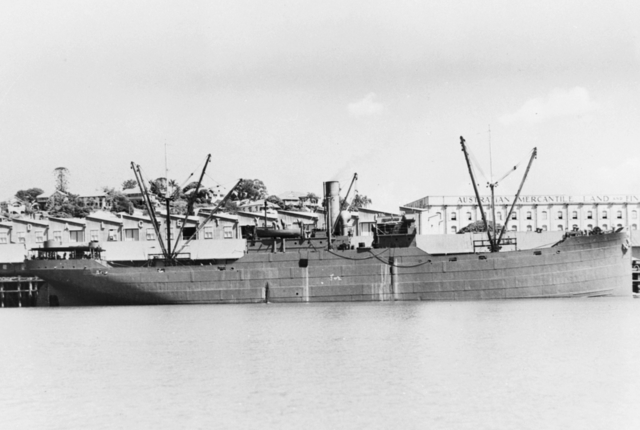
Coast Farmer Australian War Memorial photograph captioned "Starboard side view of the American transport Coast Farmer which brought U.S. troops to Australia as part of the Pensacola Convoy in 1941–12. She was torpedoed and sunk by a Japanese submarine 15 miles off Jervis Bay on 1942-07-20. (Naval Historical Collection)

=== Cargo ship 3,642 DWT ===
Submarine Boat Company built ship's Cargo 1023 ships with 3,642 DWT:

- Agawam, Hull # 1, Ship ID # 216996, Delivered: December 18, USSB # 547,
- Alamosa, Hull # 2, Ship ID # 217244, Delivered: March-19, USSB # 548,
- Alcona, Hull # 3, Ship ID # 217243, Delivered: March-19, USSB # 549,
- Ingold, Hull # 4, Ship ID # 217242, Delivered: April-19, USSB # 550,
- Charlot, Hull # 5, Ship ID # 217253, Delivered: April-19, USSB # 551,
- Chetopa, Hull # 6, Ship ID # 217623, Delivered: August-19, USSB # 552, renamed Ljubica Matkovic in 1938, torpedoed and sank in 1942
- Cokata, Hull # 7, Ship ID # 217254, Delivered: March-19, USSB # 553,
- Minnicotta/Decatur Bridge, Hull # 8, Ship ID # 217485, Delivered: April-19, USSB # 554,
- Minooka/Fort Pitt Bridge, Hull # 9, Ship ID # 217595, Delivered: April-19, USSB # 555,
- Monana, Hull # 10, Ship ID # 217621, Delivered: August-19, USSB # 556,
- Phoenix Bridge, Hull # 11, Ship ID # 217241, Delivered: April-19, USSB # 557,
- Muscado/Chicago Bridge, Hull # 12, Ship ID # 217486, Delivered: April-19, USSB # 558,
- Chartiers/Mount Vernon Bridge, Hull # 13, Ship ID # 217594, Delivered: April-19, USSB # 559,
- Panola, Hull # 14, Ship ID # 217251, Delivered: May-19, USSB # 560,
- Onekama, Hull # 15, Ship ID # 217493, Delivered: August-19, USSB # 561,
- Jekyl, Hull # 16, Ship ID # 217602, Delivered: May-19, USSB # 562,
- Ontonagon/Milwaukee Bridge, Hull # 17, Ship ID # 217928, Delivered: May-19, USSB # 563, Renamed SS Malama in 1927, bombed and sank in 1942, Two died and 33 crew with 5 Air Corps taken to POW Camp.
- Costavailla/Hico, Hull # 18, Ship ID # 217484, Delivered: April-19, USSB # 564,
- Opelika, Hull # 19, Ship ID # 217483, Delivered: May-19, USSB # 565,
- Opelousas/Masca, Hull # 20, Ship ID # 217924, Delivered: May-19, USSB # 566,
- Opequan, Hull # 21, Ship ID # 217925, Delivered: June-19, USSB # 567,
- Oquawka/Allies, Hull # 22, Ship ID # 217581, Delivered: May-19, USSB # 568,
- Oriskany/Consort, Hull # 23, Ship ID # 217622, Delivered: May-19, USSB # 569,
- Decosta/Wisconsin Bridge, Hull # 24, Ship ID # 217929, Delivered: June-19, USSB # 570, Renamed SS Wisconsin Bridge in 1921, wrecked in the Abacos in 1929
- Fortesque/Bethlehem Bridge, Hull # 25, Ship ID # 218237, Delivered: Jul-19, USSB # 571,
- Faraby, Hull # 26, Ship ID # 217640, Delivered: May-19, USSB # 572,
- Farnam, Hull # 27, Ship ID # 217568, Delivered: May-19, USSB # 573,
- Fenwick/Jackson, Hull # 28, Ship ID # 218246, Delivered: June-19, USSB # 574,
- Iberville/Louisville Bridge, Hull # 29, Ship ID # 217997, Delivered: June-19, USSB # 575,
- Acken/National Bridge, Hull # 30, Ship ID # 217927, Delivered: May-19, USSB # 576,
- Nesco, Hull # 31, Ship ID # 217601, Delivered: May-19, USSB # 577,
- Masca, Hull # 32, Ship ID # 217924, Delivered: May-19, USSB # 578,
- Moela/Knoxville, Hull # 33, Ship ID # 217927, Delivered: June-19, USSB # 579,
- Fragata/Anniston, Hull # 34, Ship ID # 217998, Delivered: June-19, USSB # 580,
- Fiaca/Chattanooga, Hull # 35, Ship ID # 217996, Delivered: June-19, USSB # 581,
- Orancken/Montgomery, Hull # 36, Ship ID # 218208, Delivered: June-19, USSB # 582,
- Elberon/St. Augustine, Hull # 37, Ship ID # 218242, Delivered: June-19, USSB # 583,
- Bound Brook, Hull # 38, Ship ID # 218059, Delivered: July-19, USSB # 584, renamed SS China Victor in 1947, sank in 1949
- Amboy/Glynn County/Brasher, Hull # 39, Ship ID # 218234, Delivered: July-19, USSB # 585,
- Aruba/Pinellas County/Johnson City, Hull # 40, Ship ID # 218239, Delivered: July-19, USSB # 586,
- Hamilton County/Shortsville, Hull # 41, Ship ID # 218241, Delivered: August-19, USSB # 587,
- Ocala/Jefferson County, Hull # 42, Ship ID # 218238, Delivered: July-19, USSB # 588,
- Allamuchy/Hillsborough County, Hull # 43, Ship ID # 218240, Delivered: June-19, USSB # 589,
- Oyachita/Dade County, Hull # 44, Ship ID # 218236, Delivered: July-19, USSB # 590,
- Waacksock/St. Johns County, Hull # 45, Ship ID # 218235, Delivered: August-19, USSB # 591,
- Watop/Davidson County, Hull # 46, Ship ID # 218456, Delivered: August-19, USSB # 592,
- Wallkill/Unicoi County, Hull # 47, Ship ID # 218460, Delivered: August-19, USSB # 593,
- Woodmansie/Mantee County, Hull # 48, Ship ID # 218461, Delivered: September-19, USSB # 594,
- Wawayanda/Boston Bridge Hull # 49 Ship ID # 218453 Delivered: July-19 USSB # 595
- Bay Head, Hull # 50, Ship ID # 218454, Delivered: July-19, USSB # 596,
- Morris/Pontia, Hull # 51, Ship ID # 218459, Delivered: Aug-19, USSB # 785,
- Aquahatan/Hopedale/Assinippi, Hull # 52, Ship ID # 218458, Delivered: August-19, USSB # 786,
- Brookline/Delavan, Hull # 53, Ship ID # 218633, Delivered: Sep-19, USSB # 787,
- Springfield/Calno, Hull # 54, Ship ID # 218455, Delivered: August-19, USSB # 788,
- Delcambie/Pawtucket, Hull # 55, Ship ID # 218457, Delivered: August-19, USSB # 789,
- Haddon, Hull # 56, Ship ID # 218631, Delivered: September-19, USSB # 790,
- Aquedocton/Cambridge , Hull # 57, Ship ID # 218634, Delivered: August-19, USSB # 791,
- Bird City/Asquam, Hull # 58, Ship ID # 218691, Delivered: August-19, USSB # 792

=== Cargo ship 3,545 DWT ===
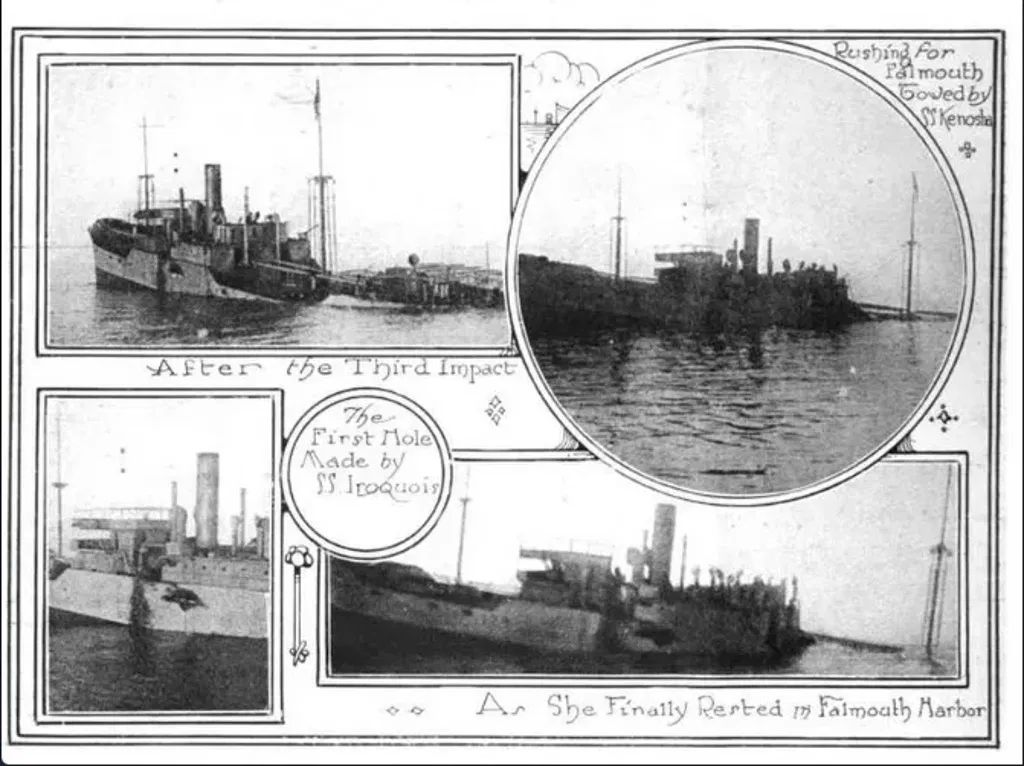
SS Rock Island Bridge collision when the Irish tanker SS Iroquois rammed her three times in fog on March 23, 1920, 8 miles off Lizard Point, Cornwall

Submarine Boat Company built ship's Cargo 1023 ships with 3,545 DWT:

- City of Fairbury/Ablanset, Hull # 59, Ship ID # 218786, Delivered: September-19, USSB # 793,
- Acockus/Casper/Lackawanna Valley, Hull # 60, Ship ID # 218789, Delivered: September-19, USSB # 794,
- Waco, Hull # 61, Ship ID # 218632, Delivered: September-19, USSB # 795,
- Acockus/Labette/Asabeth, Hull # 62, Ship ID # 218787, Delivered: September-19, USSB # 796,
- Ashuelot/Minnequa/Lordship Manor, Hull # 63, Ship ID # 218793, Delivered: September-19, USSB # 797,
- Aspomsok/Tulsa/Parksville, Hull # 64, Ship ID # 218822, Delivered: September-19, USSB # 798,
- Sevo/Fourth Alabama, Hull # 65, Ship ID # 218788, Delivered: September-19, USSB # 799,
- Assinippi/Mabel Hunter/Nonantum, Hull # 66, Ship ID # 218794, Delivered: September-19, USSB # 800,
- Attitash/Corson/Buffalo Bridge, Hull # 67, Ship ID # 218821, Delivered: October-19, USSB # 801, taken by Japan, renamed SS Kosei Maru in 1938, torpedoed and sank in 1943
- Ancoot/Wheatland/Putnam, Hull # 68, Ship ID # 218795, Delivered: September-19, USSB # 802,
- Asquam/Stanley/Continental Bridge, Hull # 69, Ship ID # 218945, Delivered: October-19, USSB # 803, renamed SS Dixie Sword in 1937, sank off Cape Cod Nantucket Shoals on Feb. 12, 1942.
- Autopscot/Nobles/Clark Mills, Hull # 70, Ship ID # 218946, Delivered: October-19, USSB # 804,
- Anaquascut/Deer Lodge/Federal Bridge, Hull # 71, Ship ID # 218944, Delivered: October-19, USSB # 805,
- Absolona/Tripp/Marsodak, Hull # 72, Ship ID # 218943, Delivered: October-19, USSB # 806, renamed SS Balladier in 1942, torpedoed and sank in 1942
- Apautuck/Dewey/Independent Bridge, Hull # 73, Ship ID # 219047, Delivered: October-19, USSB # 807,
- Jalmar/Kootenai, Hull # 74, Ship ID # 219050, Delivered: November-19, USSB # 808,
- Jabish/Deuel/Indiana Bridge/Coquitt, Hull # 75, Ship ID # 219242, Delivered: October-19, USSB # 809,
- Chequocket/Cook, Hull # 76, Ship ID # 219045, Delivered: December-19, USSB # 810,
- Chockolog/Hamlin, Hull # 77, Ship ID # 219076, Delivered: November-19, USSB # 811,
- Coasuck/Tampa/Moosehausic, Hull # 78, Ship ID # 219049, Delivered: October-19, USSB # 812,
- Cohanit/Watertown/Kenwood Bridge, Hull # 79, Ship ID # 219051, Delivered: November-19, USSB # 813, renamed SS Leonita in 1920, foundered in 1921
- Ilion/Lackawanna Bridge, Hull # 80, Ship ID # 219048, Delivered: Oct-19, USSB # 814,
- Coquitt/Indiana Bridge, Hull # 81, Ship ID # 219242, Delivered: December-19, USSB # 815,
- Coskata/Hartford/Coskata, Hull # 82, Ship ID # 219239, Delivered: December-19, USSB # 816,
- Kahna/Lakeside Bridge, Hull # 83, Ship ID # 219243, Delivered: December-19, USSB # 817, wrecked on the Azores Pico Island in 1920, in a gale after loss of propeller
- Cushnet/Waterbury/Cushnet, Hull # 84, Ship ID # 219240, Delivered: December-19, USSB # 818,
- Cuttyhunk/Auditor/Cuttyhunk, Hull # 85, Ship ID # 219241, Delivered: December-19, USSB # 819,
- Mascuppie/Glen Ridge/Massillon Bridge, Hull # 86, Ship ID # 219245, Delivered: December-19, USSB # 820,
- Malysee/Kerhonkson/Northwestern Bridge, Hull # 87, Ship ID # 219246, Delivered: December-19, USSB # 821,
- Massick/Rockaway Park/Margus, Hull # 88, Ship ID # 219244, Delivered: January-20, USSB # 822,
- Margus/Palisades/Massick, Hull # 89, Ship ID # 219263, Delivered: December-19, USSB # 823,
- Meeshawn / Tenafly / Mopang , Hull # 90, Ship ID # 219280, Delivered: January-20, USSB # 824, SS Mopang sank by a mine in 1921 near the port of Burgas
- Brasher/Riverside Bridge/Minnewawa, Hull # 91, Ship ID # 219264, Delivered: January-20, USSB # 825,
- Menemsha / Rock Island Bridge, Hull # 92, Ship ID # 219337, Delivered: January-20, USSB # 826, had collision when the Irish tanker SS Iroquois rammed her three times in fog, Rock Island Bridge on March 23, 1920, was wrecked and then scrapped.
- Monodac/Toledo Bridge, Hull # 93, Ship ID # 219499, Delivered: January-20, USSB # 827,
- Monomac, Hull # 94, Ship ID # 219336, Delivered: January-20, USSB # 828,
- Monponset/Vincennes Bridge, Hull # 95, Ship ID # 219503, Delivered: February-20, USSB # 829,
- Manasack/Virginia Bridge, Hull # 96, Ship ID # 219586, Delivered: April-20, USSB # 830,
- Pittsburgh Bridge/Tekoa, Hull # 97, Ship ID # 219766, Delivered: March-20, USSB # 831,
- Moolinoo/Archbold Bridge/Tashmoo, Hull # 98, Ship ID # 219497, Delivered: April-20, USSB # 832, renamed SS Takusei Maru in 1938, torpedoed and sank in 1942 byb USS Greenling (SS-213)
- Minnehonk/East Chicago/Tonesit, Hull # 99, Ship ID # 219501, Delivered: March-20, USSB # 833,
- Mavosheen/Noddle Island Bridge/Tona, Hull # 100, Ship ID # 219500, Delivered: February-20, USSB # 834,
- Menamah/Noddle Island Bridge/Haslehurst, Hull # 101, Ship ID # 219495, Delivered: March-20, USSB # 835,
- Crailhope/Rising Sun/Tulaid, Hull # 102, Ship ID # 219502, Delivered: February-20, USSB # 836,
- Minnewawa/Riverside Bridge , Hull # 103, Ship ID # 219585, Delivered: April-20, USSB # 837, renamed SS Coast Farmer in 1937, torpedoed and sank in 1942
- Missanco/Moravia Bridge, Hull # 104, Ship ID # 219519, Delivered: April-20, USSB # 838, Later Mana 1926, scrapped 1947
- Manhanset/Des Moines Bridge, Hull # 105, Ship ID # 219587, Delivered: April-20, USSB # 839,
- Yapam/Plow City, Hull # 106, Ship ID # 219584, Delivered: April-20, USSB # 840,
- Yukpa/Sterling Steel Bridge/Suwied, Hull # 107, Ship ID # 219496, Delivered: February-20, USSB # 841, Torpedoed and sank in 1942 off Cozumel Island off the Yucatán Peninsula.
- Yashi/Holyoke Bridge, Hull # 108, Ship ID # 219588, Delivered: May-20, USSB # 842, renamed SS Coast Trader in 1937, torpedoed and sank in 1942
- Yoati/Anthracite Bridge, Hull # 109, Ship ID # 219760, Delivered: May-20, USSB # 843,
- Yokowish/Fort Armstrong, Hull # 110, Ship ID # 219759, Delivered: May-20, USSB # 844, renamed SS Takuen Maru in 1938, foundered off Hokkaido in 1941
- Tona/Noddle Island, Hull # 111, Ship ID # 219765, Delivered: May-20, USSB # 845,
- Tolan/New England Iron/New England , Hull # 112, Ship ID # 219583, Delivered: April-20, USSB # 846,
- Tonesit/East Chicago, Hull # 113, Ship ID # 219758, Delivered: April-20, USSB # 847,
- Tockwotten/Schuylkill Bridge, Hull # 114, Ship ID # 219757, Delivered: May-20, USSB # 848,
- Tuladi/Rising Sun/Oronoke, Hull # 115, Ship ID # 219860, Delivered: June-20, USSB # 849,
- Tacconnet/Wheeling Mold, Hull # 116, Ship ID # 219861, Delivered: June-20, USSB # 850,
- Tashmoo/Archbold Bridge/Pittsburgh Bridge, Hull # 117, Ship ID # 219766, Delivered: May-20, USSB # 851, renamed SS Mapele in 1936, wrecked in 1943 off Shumagin Islands Alaska.
- Tashua/Everett Bridge/Neshobee, Hull # 118, Ship ID # 219859, Delivered: June-20, USSB # 852,
- Tauchaud, Suwied, Sterling Steel Bridge/Italia, Hull # 119, Ship ID # 219876, Delivered: June-20, USSB # 853,
- Telos/Irving Bridge/Suboatco, Hull # 120, Ship ID # 220010, Delivered: June-20, USSB # 854,
- Temisconata/Kellogg Bridge/Suedco, Hull # 121, Ship ID # 220011, Delivered: June-20, USSB # 855,
- Tekoa/Suportco, Hull # 122, Ship ID # 220248, Delivered: June-20, USSB # 856,
- Teapanock/Elchankoe/Sunelseco, Hull # 123, Ship ID # 220012, Delivered: July-20, USSB # 857,
- Tobique/Sudurco, Hull # 124, Ship ID # 220609, Delivered: August-20, USSB # 858,
- Tomahegan/Glenora/Sutransco, Hull # 125, Ship ID # 220246, Delivered: October-20, USSB # 859,
- Pemetic/Natirar/Sutermco, Hull # 126, Ship ID # 220531, Delivered: September-20, USSB # 860, renamed SS Admiral Day in 1931, wrecked off Canton Island in 1940, crew saved by HMAS Manoora (F48).
- Beargrove/Surailco, Hull # 127, Ship ID # 220403, Delivered: October-20, USSB # 861,
- Pico/Suelco, Hull # 128, Ship ID # 220247, Delivered: September-20, USSB # 862,
- Piston/Sunewco, Hull # 129, Ship ID # 220402, Delivered: October-20, USSB # 863,
- Powwow/Sutorpco, Hull # 130, Ship ID # 220401, Delivered: September-20, USSB # 864,
- Onota/Tustem/Suholco, Hull # 131, Ship ID # 220245, Delivered: August-20, USSB # 865, renamed SS Miranda in 1949, foundered in 1950
- Oronoke/Surico, Hull # 132, Ship ID # 220560, Delivered: September-20, USSB # 866,
- Hiawasse/Vierling Bridge/Suduffco, Hull # 133, Ship ID # 220559, Delivered: October-20, USSB # 867, Foundered in 1926
- Quonset/Sudawsonco, Hull # 134, Ship ID # 220626, Delivered: November-20, USSB # 868,
- Naddock/Sumanco, Hull # 135, Ship ID # 220532, Delivered: October-20, USSB # 869,
- Nugunket/Susherico, Hull # 136, Ship ID # 220561, Delivered: October-20, USSB # 870, Renamed Manini in 1928, torpedoed and sank in 1941
- Nehumkee/Jelcaw/Surichco, Hull # 137, Ship ID # 220693, Delivered: November-20, USSB # 871, renamed SS Admiral Wiley in 1930, wrecked off New Guinea in 1940
- Nebelow/Sulanierco, Hull # 138, Ship ID # 220627, Delivered: November-20, USSB # 872,
- Nequosset/Suremico, Hull # 139, Ship ID # 220694, Delivered: November-20, USSB # 873, renamed SS Nisqually in 1928, bombed and sank in off Wake Island in 1941
- Neskett/Suscolanco, Hull # 140, Ship ID # 220635, Delivered: October-20, USSB # 874,
- Neshobee/Sujameco, Hull # 141, Ship ID # 220863, Delivered: November-20, USSB # 875, Wrecked off Coos Bay in 1929
- Quinney/Suwordenco , Hull # 142, Ship ID # 220862, Delivered: December-20, USSB # 876, Renamed SS Admiral Halstead, damaged in Japanese raid on Darwin on 1942-02-19
- Deacon/Suwarinco, Hull # 143, Ship ID # 220861, Delivered: December-20, USSB # 877,
- Ibena/Sunewarkco, Hull # 144, Ship ID # 220994, Delivered: January-21, USSB # 878,
- Desha/Tamara/Sunugentco, Hull # 145, Ship ID # 221024, Delivered: January-21, USSB # 879, renamed SS Sisunthon Nawa in 1940, scuttled off Surabaya in 1942
- Kaboka/Sugillenco, Hull # 146, Ship ID # 220888, Delivered: March-21, USSB # 880, renamed SS Columbine in 1942, torpedoed and sank in 1944
- Dearing/Sujerseyco, Hull # 147, Ship ID # 220993, Delivered: February-21, USSB # 881, Later Makawao 1928, scrapped 1946
- Benoit/Suspearco, Hull # 148, Ship ID # 221066, Delivered: May-21, USSB # 882,
- Bigtunk/Sucubaco, Hull # 149, Ship ID # 221125, Delivered: June-21, USSB # 883,
- Bunganut/Suphenco, Hull # 150, Ship ID # 221212, Delivered: January-23, USSB # 884,

=== Transmarine barges ===
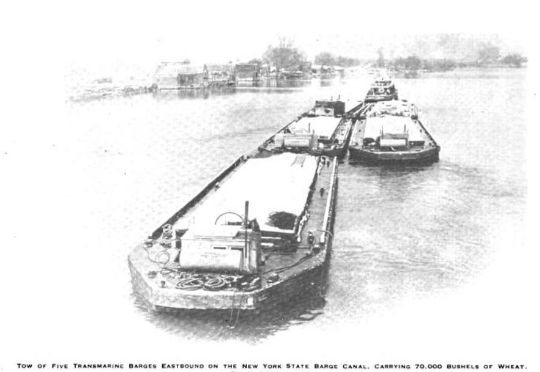
Transmarine Corporation barges working on the New York State Canal System with a cargo of wheat to New York City in 1922. Barges built by parent company Submarine Boat Company.

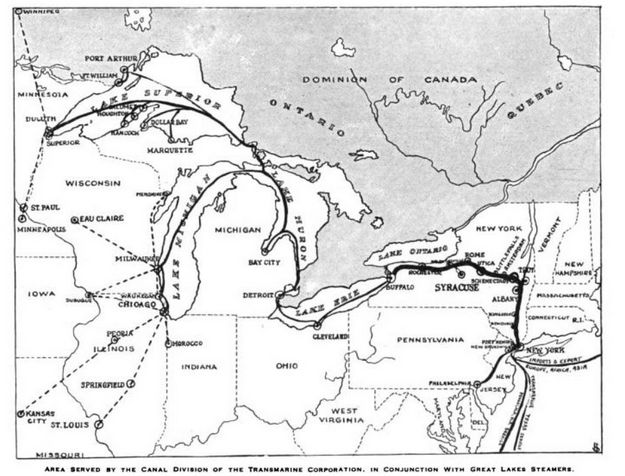
Transmarine Lines New York State Canal System barge routes in 1922. Transmarine Lines was owned by the Submarine Boat Company that built the 29 barges used on the line.

Submarine Boat Company built Transmarine Barge with 206 DWT, these were used for east coast coastal transport by Submarine Boat Company, subsidiary Transmarine:

- Transmarine No. 100, Hull # 151, Ship ID # 167934, Delivered: 1920
- Transmarine No. 101, Hull # 152, Ship ID # 167935, Delivered: 1920
- Transmarine No. 102, Hull # 153, Ship ID # 167936, Delivered: 1920
- Transmarine No. 103, Hull # 154, Ship ID # 167937, Delivered: 1920
- Transmarine No. 104, Hull # 155, Ship ID # 167954, Delivered: 1920
- Transmarine No. 105, Hull # 156, Ship ID # 167955, Delivered: 1920
- Transmarine No. 106, Hull # 157, Ship ID # 167956, Delivered: 1920
- Transmarine No. 107, Hull # 158, Ship ID # 167957, Delivered: 1920
- Transmarine No. 108, Hull # 159, Ship ID # 168161, Delivered: 1921
- Transmarine No. 109, Hull # 160, Ship ID # 168162, Delivered: 1921
- Transmarine No. 110, Hull # 161, Ship ID # 168163, Delivered: 1921
- Transmarine No. 111, Hull # 162, Ship ID # 168164, Delivered: 1921
- Transmarine No. 112, Hull # 163, Ship ID # 168165, Delivered: 1921
- Transmarine No. 113, Hull # 164, Ship ID # 168166, Delivered: 1921
- Transmarine No. 114, Hull # 165, Ship ID # 168167, Delivered: 1921
- Transmarine No. 115, Hull # 166, Ship ID # 168168, Delivered: 1921
- Transmarine No. 116, Hull # 167, Ship ID # 168157, Delivered: 1921
- Transmarine No. 117, Hull # 168, Ship ID # 168158, Delivered: 1921
- Transmarine No. 118, Hull # 169, Ship ID # 168159, Delivered: 1921
- Transmarine No. 119, Hull # 170, Ship ID # 168160, Delivered: 1921
- Transmarine No. 120, Hull # 171, Ship ID # 168382, Delivered: 1922
- Transmarine No. 121, Hull # 172, Ship ID # 168383, Delivered: 1922
- Transmarine No. 122, Hull # 173, Ship ID # 168384, Delivered: 1922
- Transmarine No. 123, Hull # 174, Ship ID # 168385, Delivered: 1922
- Transmarine No. 124, Hull # 175, Ship ID # 168386, Delivered: 1922
- Transmarine No. 125, Hull # 176, Ship ID # 168387, Delivered: 1922
- Transmarine No. 126, Hull # 177, Ship ID # 168388, Delivered: 1922
- Transmarine No. 127, Hull # 178, Ship ID # 168389, Delivered: 1922
- Transmarine No. 128, Hull # 179, Ship ID # 168390, Delivered: 1922
- Transmarine No. 129, Hull # 180, Ship ID # 168391, Delivered: 1922

== See also ==
- Electro-Dynamic Company sister company to Submarine Boat Company
- Electric Launch Company sister company to Submarine Boat Company
- New London Ship and Engine Company sister company to Submarine Boat Company
- Delaware River Iron Ship Building and Engine Works
- John Roach & Sons
