= SS Mopang =

Coordinates: 42°28.086′N 27°41.685′E

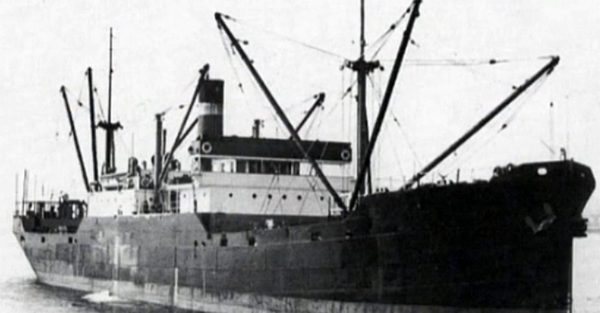
- SS Mopang

History

United States
- Name: Mopang
- Owner: USSB
- Operator: Lykes Brothers (1920); A. H. Bull & Company (1921)
- Ordered: 16 November 1917
- Builder: Submarine Boat Company, Newark
- Yard number: 90
- Laid down: 25 July 1919
- Launched: 15 November 1919
- Sponsored by: Miss Alice L. Cox
- Completed: December 1919
- Maiden voyage: 18 January 1920
- In service: 10 January 1920
- Home port: Newark
- Identification: US Official number 219280; Call sign LTVG
- Fate: Sank, 30 June 1921

General characteristics
- Type: Design 1023 ship
- Tonnage: 3,545 GRT; 2,174 NRT; 5,340 DWT
- Length: 324.0 ft (98.8 m)
- Beam: 46.2 ft (14.1 m)
- Draft: 22 ft 11 3/16 in (6.990 m) (loaded)
- Depth: 25.0 ft (7.6 m)
- Installed power: 1,500 ihp
- Propulsion: Westinghouse Electric steam turbine double reduction geared to one screw
- Speed: 10 1/2 knots (19.4 km/h)

Mopang was a steam cargo ship built in 1919 by Submarine Boat Company of Newark for the United States Shipping Board (USSB) as part of the wartime shipbuilding program of the Emergency Fleet Corporation (EFC) to restore the nation's Merchant Marine. The vessel was chiefly employed on the East Coast and Gulf to Europe routes throughout her short career. In June 1921 the vessel struck a mine while attempting to enter the Burgas Bay and sank without any casualties.

== Design and construction ==
After the United States entry into World War I, a large shipbuilding program was undertaken to restore and enhance shipping capabilities both of the United States and their Allies. As part of this program, EFC placed orders with nation's shipyards for a large number of vessels of standard designs. Design 1023 cargo ship was a standard cargo freighter of approximately 5,300 tons deadweight designed by Submarine Boat Corp. and adopted by USSB.

Mopang was part of the second optional order for 68 additional vessels placed by USSB with Submarine Boat Corp. on 16 November 1917. The ship was laid down at the shipbuilder's yard on 25 July 1919 (yard number 90) and launched on 15 November 1920, with Miss Alice L. Cox, daughter of Daniel H. Cox, secretary-treasurer of the Society of Naval Architects and Marine Engineers, being the sponsor. On this occasion the Society chartered steamer Chester W. Chapin and nearly 250 members and their families attended the launching ceremony.

Similar to all vessels of this class the ship had three islands and one main deck, had machinery situated amidships and had four main holds, both fore and aft, which allowed for the carriage of variety of goods and merchandise. The vessel also possessed all the modern machinery for quick loading and unloading of cargo from five large hatches, including ten winches and ten booms. She was also equipped with wireless apparatus and had electrical lights installed along the deck.

As built, the ship was 324.0 feet (98.8 m) long (between perpendiculars) and 46.2 feet (14.1 m) abeam and had a depth of 25.0 feet (7.6 m). Mopang was originally assessed at 3,545 GRT and 2,174 NRT and had deadweight of approximately 5,340. The vessel had a steel hull with double bottom throughout and a single turbine rated at 1,500 shp, double reduction geared to a single screw propeller, that moved the ship at up to 10 1/2 knots (12.1 mph; 19.4 km/h). The steam for the engine was supplied by two Babcock & Wilcox Water Tube boilers fitted for oil fuel.

The vessel construction was finalized in December 1919 and the ship proceeded to New York on 7 January 1920 where she was inspected by the USSB representatives and officially accepted by them on 10 January 1920.

== Operational history ==
Following delivery and acceptance by the USSB, Mopang was immediately allocated to Lykes Brothers to serve on their Gulf to Europe and United Kingdom routes. The freighter cleared out from New York on January 13 bound for New Orleans but was forced to return on January 15. She sailed out again on January 18 arriving in Port Eads on January 26. After loading her cargo consisting of several hundred thousands feet of planks, ash, pine, gum tree and mahogany lumber and staves in addition to other general merchandise, the freighter departed New Orleans on February 10 bound for London. The ship stopped at Norfolk on February 18 for bunkers and then continued on arriving at her destination on March 12. Prior to her arrival, on March 11, she suffered broken steering gear which caused the vessel to stay in port until repairs were finalized. On her return trip to the United States the freighter had to put into Fayal with her No. 2 hold leaking and ballast shifted. The freighter was only able to sail two weeks later destined for Key West and further west towards Gulf ports. The steamer would continue having problems with her steering gear and engines throughout her career. For example, on July 16 when leaving Mobile for Galveston Mopang was forced to anchor due to her gear becoming unmanageable.

On her next Transatlantic voyage Mopang left Port Arthur on August 2 for Liverpool via Norfolk. On August 29 it was reported that the steamer's engines became disabled and beyond repair and she was drifting helplessly while off the coast of Ireland. The ship was taken into tow by another steamer, SS Capulin, and brought safely into Liverpool. After spending over a month overseas undergoing repairs, Mopang returned to Norfolk on October 21. Once there the vessel was returned by Lykes Brothers to USSB, who in turn reallocated her to Bull Lines.

A.H. Bull & Co. were operators of Bull Line, which provided biweekly service from New York to Constantinople and all Black Sea ports. Upon delivery Mopang was put on this route, and after several delays cleared from New York on December 28, carrying among other cargo approximately 700 tons of food aid destined for the Republic of Armenia. After an uneventful journey the ship reached her destination on 5 February 1921. After unloading the ship sailed back to United States and arrived at New York on March 22.

Upon her arrival Mopang was chosen by the American Committee for Relief in the Near East to carry large quantities of food supplies to famine victims in Armenia. The cargo was collected and loaded over the two months period and consisted of nearly 2,000 tons of foodstuffs in addition to large quantity of flour. The cargo was blessed by the suffragan bishop Herbert Shipman on May 17 in front of a large gathering including many dignitaries including Dr. James L. Barton, Head of the Near East Relief, Ernest M. Bull, owner of the Bull Line, brigadier general William Weigel among others. The freighter eventually sailed out from New York on May 25 bound for Constantinople, where she were to unload the bulk of her cargo, and then continuing on to Burgas and Constanța.

=== Sinking ===
Mopang sailed from New York at the end of May 1921 for the Near East. On June 9 she passed Gibraltar and arrived at İstanbul on June 17. The freighter was under command of captain A. C. Hager and had a crew of 39. The steamship unloaded the bulk of her cargo there and after refilling her bunkers sailed out into Black Sea having on board approximately 650 tons of cargo. The ship arrived in view of Burgas in the early morning of June 30. Mopang then proceeded to enter the Burgas Bay, but at approximately 05:30 when she was 1.7 nmi (3.1 km) off Megalo Nisi light, she hit an old World War I-era naval mine. The contact with mine happened between No. 1 and No. 2 holds and an explosion that followed tore a huge hole in the steamer's hull. The crew hastily abandoned the vessel, which filled up quickly with water and after listing on her starboard side sank bow first approximately 5–6 minutes after the explosion in about 13 fathoms (78 ft; 24 m) of water. There were no casualties and the entire crew was rescued owing to close proximity to the shore and town of Sozopol. In July all crew members with the exception of the captain sailed back to the United States on board steamer SS Magnahelias. The captain stayed behind temporarily in an attempt to recover the ship's safe in case salvage operations would be ordered, however, USSB decided not to pursue them.

== Wreck ==
The wreck lies largely intact on its starboard side at a depth between 20 m (66 ft) and 33 m (108 ft) of water. Height from the bottom is 7 m (23 ft). The main damage from the explosion is to the bow section of the ship. Clearly discernible are the superstructures, parts of the funnel and deck. The holds and some of the cabins are freely accessible. Parts of the cargo – a heap of boots, wooden boxes with spare parts, etc. are visible in the holds. The screw with a diameter of around three meters and the stern hoist are in place. The anchor chain slides along the hull and sinks into the silt on the bottom. Probably the anchor came loose at the time of sinking and wound itself about the ship.

In August 2018, oil leaked from the ship after severe weather and strong underwater currents, but authorities described the leak as "minimal and quite limited." A ship from the European Maritime Safety Agency was sent to the area to collect oil that had leaked into the water. Plans were also made to pump the remaining fuel out of the ship's tanks.
