= Design 1023 ship =

Steel-hulled cargo ship design

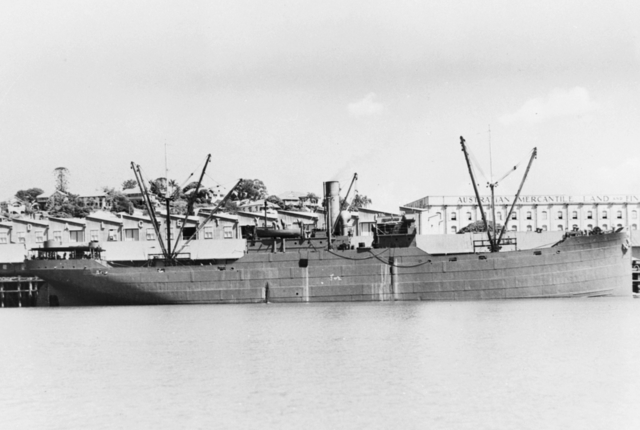
- Coast Farmer, yard #103 completed as Riverside Bridge (1920).

Class overview
- Name: EFC Design 1023
- Builders: Submarine Boat Corporation (SBC); New York Harbor Drydock Company/Bayles Shipyards
- Built: 1918–20 (USSB); 1920–21 (private)
- Planned: 150 SBC; 4 (Bayles)
- Completed: 118 for USSB; 32 by SBC for own account; 4 Bayles hulls purchased on ways incomplete, later completed
- Canceled: 32 Submarine Boat Corporation completed privately; 4 Bayles, bought on ways incomplete
- Lost: 30
- Scrapped: 124

General characteristics
- Type: Cargo ship
- Tonnage: 3,658 GRT; 5,075 DWT; 2,214 NRT
- Length: 324.0 ft (98.8 m) registry length
- Beam: 46.2 ft (14.1 m)
- Draft: 25 ft (7.6 m)
- Depth: 25.0 ft (7.6 m)
- Installed power: 386 NHP
- Propulsion: 2 oil fired boilers, steam turbine, single screw propeller; 4 Bayles vessels: triple expansion steam engine
- Speed: 10.5 kn (12.1 mph; 19.4 km/h)
- Range: 10,080 nmi (18,670 km; 11,600 mi)

The Design 1023 ship (full name Emergency Fleet Corporation Design 1023) was a steel-hulled cargo ship design approved for mass production by the United States Shipping Board's (USSB) Emergency Fleet Corporation (EFC) in World War I. Like many of the early designs approved by the EFC, the Design 1023 did not originate with the EFC itself but was based on an existing cargo ship designed by Theodore E. Ferris for the United States Shipping Board (USSB). The ships, to be built by the Submarine Boat Corporation of Newark, New Jersey, were the first to be constructed under a standardized production system worked out by Ferris and approved by the USSB.

The first contract envisioned construction of fifty vessels and was placed by USSB with Submarine Boat Corp. on 14 September 1917 and included EFC hulls 547–596. Two months later, on 16 November 1917, USSB placed two additional optional orders with the same shipbuilder for sixty eight and thirty two vessels, respectively. This brought the total number of ships ordered from Submarine Boat Corp. to 150 and included EFC hulls 785–884. In addition on 8 November 1917 USSB also placed a small order for four vessels with Bayles Shipyard in Port Jefferson, New York (EFC hulls 773–776). USSB chose to exercise their first optional contract for sixty eight extra vessels planned for Submarine Boat Corp. and 118 ships, yard numbers 1–118, were completed for the USSB between 30 May 1918 and 27 Mar 1920.

The second optional contract for thirty two vessels was never exercised by USSB and the contract was officially rescinded by the Shipping Board on 28 February 1920. The Shipping Board also decided not to build any ships at Bayless Shipyard and officially canceled their order on 1 February 1920. However, Submarine Boat Corp. elected to proceed with construction and completed the remaining thirty two vessels for Submarine Boat's shipping subsidiary, Transmarine, between 30 March 1920 and 11 April 1921. All the Submarine Boat ships were steam turbine propelled. The first vessel, Agawam, was completed in 1918. The government and Submarine Boat reached an agreement by which the company would take over the USSB owned yard that it had been operating. It would pay a rental of $4,000,000 for three years and then buy the plant. It would also buy the fabricated steel at the plant for half price and complete the 32 cancelled hulls on its own account.

Four Design 1023 hulls, EFC 773–776, were under construction by New York Harbor Drydock Company, formerly Bayles Shipyards, when they were cancelled and sold on the ways. The ships were powered by triple expansion steam engines rather than the steam turbine of the basic design.

A number of the ships were lost and known or presumed captured by the Japanese in World War II. For example, Surico, later Admiral Gove and Ramona, was sunk at Shanghai, salvaged and named Hitora Maru. The ship survived the war after being burned out, salvaged again to be repaired in Panama and operating as Valles into the late 1950s. Another became a Japanese ship and a casualty of the war. Buffalo Bridge went to Japan for break up under the temporary name Buffalo Bridge Maru but was not scrapped and became Kosei Maru which was sunk by the USS Sunfish 13 March 1943.

Many of the ships were broken up or otherwise lost between 1929 and 1945 but a few survived the war. An example of surprising survival is Sunewco, one of the ships completed in 1920 for Transmarine as was Surico. Renamed Admiral Y. S. Williams in 1934 the ship was scuttled in Hong Kong in December 1941. The hull was salvaged by the Japanese and operated as Tatsutama Maru which survived the war but was found to be unfit for service in 1945. In 1952 the ship was put back in service as Yamahagi Maru until disappearing from registry in 1956.

== Notable ships of the class ==
- Admiral Halstead, originally Suwordenco, one of the ships of the Pensacola Convoy
- Coast Farmer previously Point Arena (1928) and Riverside Bridge (1920) and one of the ships of the Pensacola Convoy
- Coast Trader originally Holyoke Bridge sank by Japanese submarine I-26 on off state of Washington
- Malama, originally Milwaukee Bridge, scuttled by crew on 2 January 1942 while being pursued by armed merchant cruisers Aikoku Maru and Hōkoku Maru
- Mopang sank on June 30, 1921, after hitting a mine off port of Burgas
- Nisqually, originally Suremico converted to scow 1937, bombed and sunk by Japanese aircraft during the Battle of Wake Island.

== Bibliography ==
- McKellar, Norman L. "Steel Shipbuilding under the U. S. Shipping Board, 1917-1921, Part III, Contract Steel Ships" (PDF). Steel Shipbuilding under the U. S. Shipping Board, 1917-1921. ShipScribe.
