= List of Emergency Fleet Corporation ship designs =

This is a list of ship designs by the Emergency Fleet Corporation, since the corporation's inception in 1917.

Design number	Description	DWT	LOA	Number completed
1001	Wooden cargo ship	3,500 long tons (3,600 t)	281.5 feet (85.8 m)	
1002	Wooden cargo ship	3,000 long tons (3,000 t)	260 feet (79 m)	None ordered
1003	Wooden cargo ship	3,500 long tons (3,600 t)	289 feet (88 m)	
1004	Wooden cargo ship	4,000 long tons (4,100 t)	287 feet (87 m)	
1005	Wooden cargo ship	4,000 long tons (4,100 t)	290 feet (88 m)	
1006	Wooden cargo ship	4,700 long tons (4,800 t)	315 feet (96 m)	
1007	Wooden cargo ship	2,500 long tons (2,500 t)	261 feet (80 m)	
1008	Wooden hull	3,650 long tons (3,710 t)	287 feet (87 m)	
1009	Composite cargo ship	3,500 long tons (3,600 t)	284.5 feet (86.7 m)	
1010	Composite cargo ship	3,500 long tons (3,600 t)	284.5 feet (86.7 m)	
1011	Wooden cargo ship	4,000 long tons (4,100 t)	308 feet (94 m)	
1012	Steel cargo ship	6,000 long tons (6,100 t)	346.5 feet (105.6 m)	4
1013	Steel cargo ship	8,800 long tons (8,900 t)	423.8 feet (129.2 m)	111
1014	Steel cargo ship	7,500 long tons (7,600 t)	396 feet (121 m)	22
1015	Steel cargo ship	9,400 long tons (9,600 t)	416 feet (127 m)	84
1016	Steel cargo ship	8,800 long tons (8,900 t)	423.8 feet (129.2 m)	14
1017	Steel cargo ship	7,500 long tons (7,600 t)	395.5 feet (120.5 m)	11
1018	Steel cargo ship	10,000 long tons (10,000 t)	450 feet (140 m)	5
1019	Steel cargo ship	8,800 long tons (8,900 t)	427 feet (130 m)	55
1020	Steel cargo ship	3,550 long tons (3,610 t)	261 feet (80 m)	92
1021	Steel cargo ship	6,000 long tons (6,100 t)	354.5 feet (108.1 m)	3
1022	Steel cargo ship	7,500 long tons (7,600 t)	401 feet (122 m)	110
1023	Steel cargo ship	5,075 long tons (5,156 t)	335.5 feet (102.3 m)	154
1024	Steel transport	8,000 long tons (8,100 t)	448 feet (137 m)	12
1025	Steel cargo ship	9,000 long tons (9,100 t)	415 feet (126 m)	
1026	Steel cargo ship	7,300 long tons (7,400 t)	385 feet (117 m)	
1027	Steel cargo ship	9,500 long tons (9,700 t)	416 feet (127 m)	
1028	Steel cargo ship	7,500 long tons (7,600 t)	389 feet (119 m)	
1029	Steel transport	13,000 long tons (13,000 t)	535 feet (163 m)	16 (Note: Six ships were laid down as Design 1095, but were completed to Design 1029 specifications)
1030	Steel tanker	10,000 long tons (10,000 t)	444 feet (135 m)	None ordered
1031	Steel tanker	7,500 long tons (7,600 t)	405 feet (123 m)	11
1032	Steel cargo ship	12,000 long tons (12,000 t)	457 feet (139 m)	5
1033	Steel cargo ship	5,650 long tons (5,740 t)	387.3 feet (118.0 m)	None ordered
1034	Steel cargo ship	6,000 long tons (6,100 t)	448 feet (137 m)	None ordered
1035	Steel ocean tug	N/A	150 feet (46 m)	
1036	Steel harbor tug	N/A	100.2 feet (30.5 m)	
1037	Steel cargo ship	9,600 long tons (9,800 t)	410.3 feet (125.1 m)	48
1038	Steel cargo ship	5,000 long tons (5,100 t)	335.5 feet (102.3 m)	8
1039	Steel barge	7,500 long tons (7,600 t)	352 feet (107 m)	
1040	Concrete hull	3,000 long tons (3,000 t)	260 feet (79 m)	
1041	Steel tanker	10,000 long tons (10,000 t)	425 feet (130 m) (pp)	
1042	Steel cargo ship	3,350 long tons (3,400 t)	261 feet (80 m)	6
1043	Steel cargo ship	5,350 long tons (5,440 t)	320.8 feet (97.8 m) (pp)	9
1044	Steel cargo ship	3,400 long tons (3,500 t)	261.3 feet (79.6 m)	8
1045	Steel tanker	9,100 long tons (9,200 t)	431.8 feet (131.6 m)	6
1046	Steel cargo ship	7,400 long tons (7,500 t)	391.8 feet (119.4 m)	6
1047	Steel tanker	10,100 long tons (10,300 t)	435 feet (133 m) (pp)	28
1048	Concrete cargo ship	3,500 long tons (3,600 t)	281.5 feet (85.8 m)	
1049	Steel cargo ship	3,700 long tons (3,800 t)	300 feet (91 m)	11
1050	Steel cargo ship	5,000 long tons (5,100 t)	344.8 feet (105.1 m)	None ordered
1051	Wooden hull	4,600 long tons (4,700 t)	315 feet (96 m)	
1052	Wooden barge	600 long tons (610 t)	100 feet (30 m) (pp)	None ordered
1053	Wooden barge	500 long tons (510 t)	102 feet (31 m)	None ordered
1054	Wooden barge	260 long tons (260 t)	85 feet (26 m) (pp)	None ordered
1055	Wooden ocean tug	N/A	150 feet (46 m)	
1056	Wooden cargo ship	5,000 long tons (5,100 t)	410 feet (120 m) (pp)	
1057	Steel cargo ship	11,800 long tons (12,000 t)	427 feet (130 m)	3
1058	Steel tanker	6,000 long tons (6,100 t)	354.5 feet (108.1 m)	5
1059	Steel tanker	10,300 long tons (10,500 t)	430 feet (130 m)	12
1060	Steel cargo ship	4,200 long tons (4,300 t)	261 feet (80 m)	24
1061	Wooden ocean tug	N/A	133 feet (41 m)	
1062	Wooden barge	3,500 long tons (3,600 t)	255 feet (78 m)	None ordered
1063	Steel cargo ship	7,433 long tons (7,552 t)	392.5 feet (119.6 m)	10
1064	Steel barge	N/A	300 feet (91 m) (pp)	None ordered
1065	Wooden cargo ship	3,500 long tons (3,600 t)	281.5 feet (85.8 m)	
1066	Steel cargo ship	8,800 long tons (8,900 t)	423.8 feet (129.2 m)	
1067	Wooden barge	2,500 long tons (2,500 t)	240 feet (73 m)	
1068	Wooden barge	3,000 long tons (3,000 t)	N/A	None ordered
1069	Wooden barge	3,500 long tons (3,600 t)	275 feet (84 m)	
1070	Concrete cargo ship	3,500 long tons (3,600 t)	281.8 feet (85.9 m)	
1071	Concrete cargo ship	7,500 long tons (7,600 t)	N/A	None ordered
1072	Wooden cargo ship	5,000 long tons (5,100 t)	327.5 feet (99.8 m)	
1073	Steel cargo ship	4,300 long tons (4,400 t)	284.5 feet (86.7 m)	
1074	Steel cargo ship	4,050 long tons (4,110 t)	261 feet (80 m)	52
1075	Wooden cargo ship	4,500 long tons (4,600 t)	307 feet (94 m)	
1076	Wooden ocean tug	320 long tons (330 t)	140 feet (43 m)	
1077	Steel barge	5,000 long tons (5,100 t)	372.8 feet (113.6 m)	None ordered
1078	Steel cargo ship	8,725 long tons (8,865 t)	401 feet (122 m) (pp)	
1079	Steel cargo ship	9,600 long tons (9,800 t)	423.8 feet (129.2 m)	
1080	Steel cargo ship	8,800 long tons (8,900 t)	426 feet (130 m)	12
1082	Steel barge	3,800 long tons (3,900 t)	N/A	None ordered
1084	Wooden cargo ship	1,500 long tons (1,500 t)	N/A	None ordered
1085	Wooden ocean tug	N/A	100 feet (30 m)	
1086	Wooden harbor tug	N/A	101 feet (31 m)	
1090	Steel ocean tug	N/A	150 feet (46 m)	None ordered
1092	Steel cargo ship	10,000 long tons (10,000 t)	443 feet (135 m)	4
1093	Steel cargo ship	4,200 long tons (4,300 t)	361 feet (110 m)	60
1094	Steel cargo ship	5,100 long tons (5,200 t)	339 feet (103 m)	7
1095	Steel transport	12,000 long tons (12,000 t)	502 feet (153 m)	7 (Note: Six ships were laid down as Design 1095, but were completed to Design 1029 specifications)
1096	Steel barge	1,800 long tons (1,800 t)	206 feet (63 m)	
1097	Steel cargo ship	3,200 long tons (3,300 t)	260.8 feet (79.5 m)	1 (Note: Existing ship retrofitted)
1099	Steel cargo ship	4,050 long tons (4,110 t)	261 feet (80 m)	91
1100	Concrete tanker	7,500 long tons (7,600 t)	434.3 feet (132.4 m)	
1101	Concrete cargo ship	7,500 long tons (7,600 t)	434.3 feet (132.4 m) (est)	
1102	Wooden cargo ship	4,500 long tons (4,600 t)	307 feet (94 m)	
1103	Steel cargo ship	11,750 long tons (11,940 t)	419.5 feet (127.9 m) (pp)	1
1104	Wooden cargo ship	4,800 long tons (4,900 t)	298.0 feet (90.8 m) (pp)	
1105	Steel cargo ship	9,500 long tons (9,700 t)	415.9 feet (126.8 m)	14
1106	Steel tanker	11,375 long tons (11,558 t)	477.8 feet (145.6 m)	8
1109	Wooden barge	2,000 long tons (2,000 t)	N/A	
1110	Steel cargo ship	5,800 long tons (5,900 t)	N/A	None ordered
1111	Wooden hull	5,000 long tons (5,100 t)	N/A	
1115	Wooden hull	3,650 long tons (3,710 t)	N/A	
1116	Wooden hull	4,100 long tons (4,200 t)	N/A	
1117	Steel cargo ship	12,500 long tons (12,700 t)	470 feet (140 m)	None ordered
1118	Steel cargo ship	5,500 long tons (5,600 t)	330.3 feet (100.7 m) (pp)	
1119	Steel cargo ship	6,300 long tons (6,400 t)	357 feet (109 m)	
1120	Steel cargo ship	10,500 long tons (10,700 t)	437 feet (133 m)	
1121	Steel cargo ship	5,000 long tons (5,100 t)	315 feet (96 m)	
1122	Steel cargo ship	9,000 long tons (9,100 t)	385 feet (117 m) (pp)	
1123	Steel cargo ship	5,500 long tons (5,600 t)	315.9 feet (96.3 m) (pp)	
1124	Steel cargo ship	12,600 long tons (12,800 t)	461 feet (141 m)	
1125	Steel cargo ship	6,650 long tons (6,760 t)	372 feet (113 m)	
1126	Steel cargo ship	8,360 long tons (8,490 t)	413 feet (126 m)	
1127	Steel cargo ship	10,000 long tons (10,000 t)	420 feet (130 m)	
1128	Steel tanker	10,000 long tons (10,000 t)	446 feet (136 m)	4
1129	Wooden barge	3,500 long tons (3,600 t)	N/A	
1133	Steel cargo ship	11,000 long tons (11,000 t)	431 feet (131 m) (pp)	5
1135	Steel cargo ship	12,706 long tons (12,910 t)	439.5 feet (134.0 m) (pp)	
1136	Steel cargo ship	12,373 long tons (12,572 t)	439.5 feet (134.0 m) (pp)	
