= SS West Caddoa =

Cargo ship

History

United States;United Kingdom
- Name: West Caddoa (1919–1940); Empire Guillemot (1940–1941)
- Owner: USSB (1919–1936); MARCOM (1936-1940); Ministry of War Transport (1940–1941)
- Operator: W. A. Souter & Co (1940–1941)
- Ordered: 2 February 1918
- Builder: Western Pipe & Steel Co of San Francisco
- Yard number: 10
- Launched: May 23, 1919
- Christened: West Caddoa
- Commissioned: September 26, 1919
- Home port: San Francisco (1919-1940); London (1940-1941)
- Identification: US official number 218973; UK official number 168164; code letters LTBW (1920–33); Call sign KODF (1933–40); Call sign GNRN (1940–41)
- Fate: Sunk, October 24, 1941

General characteristics
- Tonnage: 5,641 GRT*; 3,522 NRT; 8,584 DWT
- Length: 410 ft 5 in (125.10 m)
- Beam: 54 ft 0 in (16.46 m)
- Depth: 27 ft 2 in (8.28 m)
- Installed power: 2800 Ihp, 359 Nhp
- Propulsion: Joshua Hendy Co 3-cylinder triple expansion
- Speed: 10.5 knots
- Crew: 45

West Caddoa was a Design 1019 cargo ship built in 1919 by the Western Pipe & Steel Co of San Francisco. She was one of many ships built by the company for the United States Shipping Board.

== Design and construction ==
The West ships were cargo ships of similar size and design built by several shipyards on the West Coast of the United States for the United States Shipping Board (USSB) for emergency use during World War I. Most were given names that began with the word West. West Caddoa was launched at the shipyard of Western Pipe & Steel Co in San Francisco on 23 May 1919 (yard number 10, USSB hull number 1149). As built, the ship was 410 feet 5 1/2 inches (125.108 m) long (between perpendiculars) and 54 feet 0 inches (16.46 m) abeam, a mean draft of 24 feet 2 1/2 inches (7.379 m). West Caddoa was assessed at 5,721 GRT, 3,557 NRT and 8,584 DWT. The vessel had a steel hull, and a single 359 nhp triple-expansion steam engine that drove a single screw propeller, and moved the ship at up to 10.5 knots (12.1 mph; 19.4 km/h).

== Operational history ==
West Caddoa was launched on May 23, 1919, and delivered to the United States Shipping Board on September 26, 1919. Initially, she was operated by Pacific Mail Steamship Company, who ran a Manila-Calcutta route and assigned West Caddoa and another similar ship SS Haleakala to operate on it. On November 16, 1920, following a successful round-the-world trip by another vessel, SS West Kasson, West Caddoa departed San Francisco on a similar mission, touching twenty ports, with the first being Honolulu, and ending at Baltimore. On January 5, 1921, she was in Manila and arrived in New York City on April 18, 1921. In August 1921 she was in dock undergoing maintenance and repairs to her crankshaft.

In early January 1922 West Caddoa was allocated to Strachan Shipping, but on January 25, 1922, she was in Savannah, Georgia for repairs with a broken steerer. In early May 1922 she was reallocated to Carolina Company which would put her on South Atlantic-Hamburg-Bremen route. On June 17, 1922, while coming from Jacksonville, Florida through Bremen to Holtenau, she collided in Kiel Canal with a Swedish steamer. She had to stay in Hamburg to repair damage to her bow.

From late 1922 and on West Caddoa was involved in cotton trade between the Gulf ports of the United States, such as New Orleans and Port Eads and Galveston and British ports of Liverpool and Manchester.

In 1936 she was turned over to MARCOM after the United States Shipping Board was dissolved.

West Caddoa was loaned to the Ministry of War Transport in 1940, and was formally handed over in New Orleans on September 26, 1940. She was renamed Empire Guillemot and her homeport was moved to London.

She subsequently moved north and was scheduled to go to UK with a load of scrap iron with convoy HX 115 on March 17, 1941. Upon arrival she had to undergo repairs to her engines (on February 13) and boilers (on March 25) which delayed her departure. She eventually traveled to Grangemouth with convoy HX 117 instead. The convoy departed Halifax, Nova Scotia on March 27, 1941, and arrived in Liverpool on April 15 of the same year.

Upon arrival in Scotland she was again put in dock for repairs to her engine and deck which kept her out of operation until late summer.

=== Sinking ===
Empire Guillemot was chosen to participate in the Operation "Propeller", an attempt to supply Malta with single ships. She left from Oban on August 30, 1941, with convoy OG 73 with a cargo of fodder for livestock on Malta. After a long journey, she arrived off Gibraltar on September 13, 1941, and passed through the Straits of Gibraltar, with Spanish markings, during the night of 13/14 September 1941 escorted by the corvettes Gentian and Jasmine. She hoisted a Vichy France flag on September 15 until her arrival off Bizerta, where she raised the Italian ensign and followed the route north toward Sicily. On the final run to Malta she wore British colours and reached the island early on 19 September.

Empire Guillemot was scheduled to return during Operation "Halberd" but could not sail as a result of engine defects she experienced again on October 17. She eventually left Malta independently on 22 October 1941 at night, but the freighter was soon shadowed by the Italian naval trawler Corrispondente Beta, which on October 24 vectored three SM-79 of 130 Group (two from 280 Squadron, Capitano Melley's 280–3, and Sototenente Caresio's 280–9, and one from 283 Squadron piloted by Tenente Guido Focacci) towards her west of the island of La Galite. Empire Guillemot was hit at 14:00 by one torpedo launched by the aircraft of Tenente Focacci, and sank 30 miles off Las Rosas about 40 minutes later. The plane piloted by Sototenente Caresio did not launch his torpedo. All planes returned to the base at 15:20.

As a result of the attack, one officer was killed, and the remaining 38 crew and six gunners got away in two boats. One of the boats was wrecked in surf when landing on the North African coast and nine more men were lost. The survivors were interned by the Vichy French, but one more crew member died in captivity. Overall, there were 33 survivors, and 12 fatalities.
