= USS Rainbow =

Tender of the United States Navy

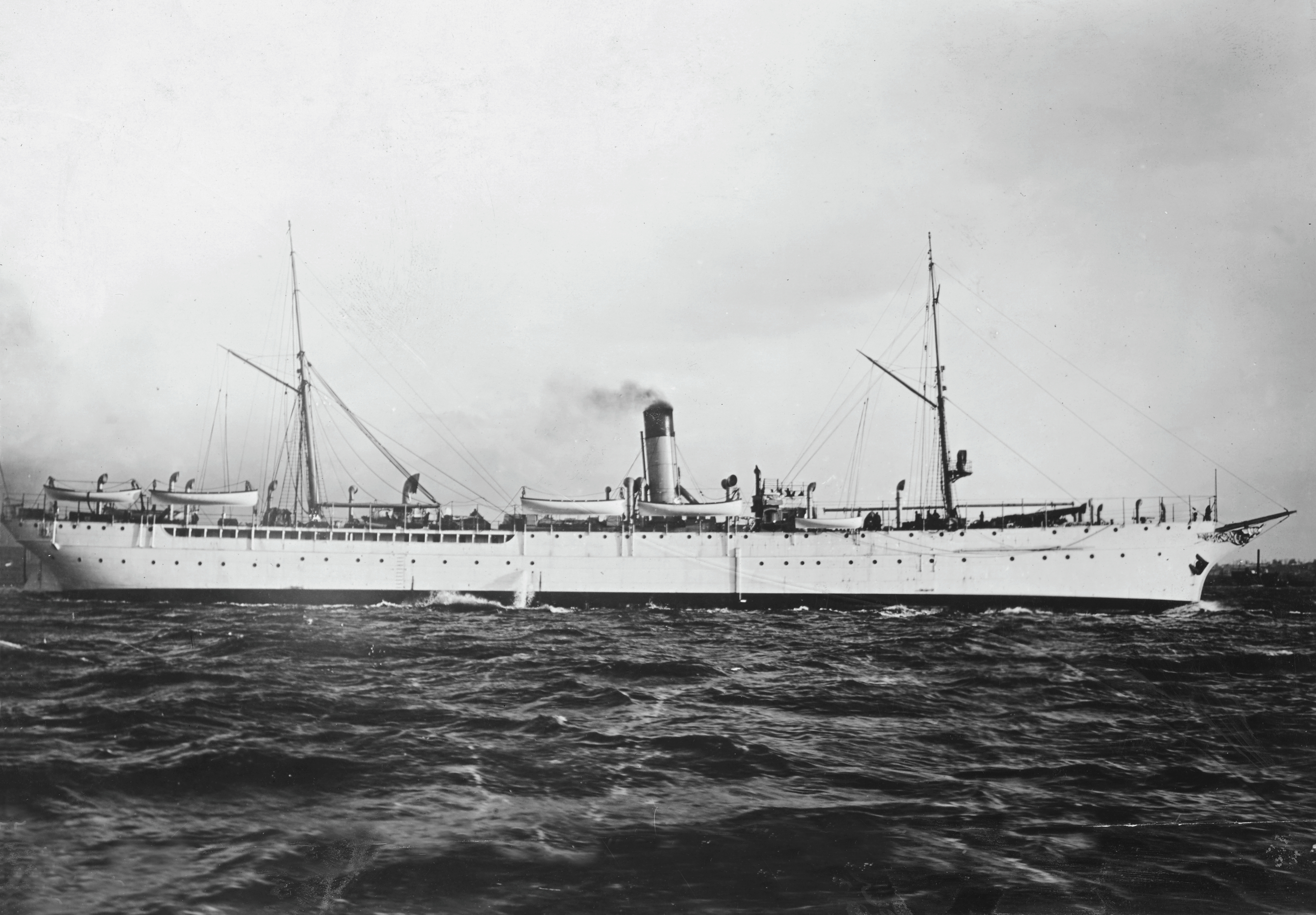

History

United States
- Name: USS Rainbow
- Builder: James Laing, Sunderland, England
- Launched: 7 January 1890, as Norse King
- Acquired: by purchase, 29 June 1898
- Commissioned: 2 December 1901
- Decommissioned: 24 December 1914
- Recommissioned: 29 January 1916
- Decommissioned: 11 July 1925
- Reclassified: AS-7, 17 July 1920
- Stricken: 26 June 1928
- Fate: Sold for scrap, 13 September 1928

General characteristics
- Type: Distilling ship / Submarine tender
- Displacement: 4,360 long tons (4,430 t)
- Length: 325 ft 9 in (99.29 m)
- Beam: 41 ft 1 in (12.52 m)
- Draft: 17 ft 8 in (5.38 m)
- Propulsion: 2 coal-fired boilers, 1 triple-expansion engine, single shaft
- Speed: 12 knots (22 km/h; 14 mph)
- Complement: 55 officers and enlisted
- Armament: 6 × 6 pounder guns; 6 × 1 pounder guns

USS Rainbow (AS-7) was the only ship in the United States Navy by that name. The ship was originally converted to a distilling ship in 1898, and then converted again in 1917 to a submarine tender.

Rainbow was built in 1890 as the merchant ship Norse King by James Laing at Sunderland, England. She was purchased by the U.S. Navy on 29 June 1898, placed in reduced commission on 18 July, and transferred to the New York Navy Yard for fitting out for use as a distilling and station ship in the Philippines.

== Service history ==
=== Asiatic Fleet, 1901–1908 ===
Rainbow was commissioned in full on 2 December 1901, Comdr. S. A. Stanton in command, and was assigned to the Asiatic Fleet. En route to the Philippines, she sailed via Gibraltar for the Suez Canal, calling at Palermo, Sicily; Port Said, Egypt; Colombo, Ceylon; and Singapore before arriving at Cavite on 3 April 1902.

Rainbow, as flagship of the Philippine Squadron, remained in the Philippines, with only periodic runs to Hong Kong for repairs, until 1906. Her range was then expanded from an annual circuit among Philippine ports to include visits to various Japanese ports, and in November 1907, a call at Vladivostok with Secretary of War Taft embarked.

=== Pacific Fleet, 1908–1911 ===
Becoming flagship of the 3rd Squadron, Pacific Fleet, in 1908, Rainbow cruised among the Philippine and Japanese islands and off the coast of China, and, on at least one occasion, December 1908-January 1909, conducted hydrologic surveys. Then, designated tender to the First Torpedo Flotilla, she alternated between the China coast and the Philippines until pressed into service as a transport in 1911.

=== Asiatic Fleet, 1911–1914 ===
Rainbow departed Cavite on 26 October 1911, en route with an expeditionary force of Marines landed at Wusong (31 October-1 November) to help protect American nationals from imminent dangers of the revolutionary turmoil in China. She became the temporary flagship of the Commander-in-Chief, Asiatic Fleet, 1 November 1911, cruising the China coast to observe conditions which might affect the safety of Americans at Shanghai, Wusong, Nanjing, Amoy, Shantou, Qingdao, and Taku.

Saratoga (ACR-2) relieved Rainbow as Asiatic Fleet flagship on 10 April 1912. Rainbow then proceeded to Huangpu where she became the flagship of the China Squadron on 13 April. She supported Marine expeditionary forces on the China coast until 30 August 1912, when she sailed from Yantai for repairs at Olongapo, Philippine Islands.

Rainbow shifted from Olongapo to Cavite on 8 October 1912 and served there as temporary flagship for the Commander-in-Chief, Asiatic Fleet (30 October-7 November). She departed Cavite on 7 November 1912, bound by way of Wusong, Shanghai, and the Yangtze River to Nanjing, China. She arrived at Nanjing on 20 November and sailed 10 days later to cruise with the American ambassador to the ports of Shanghai, Hong Kong, Shantou, Amoy, and Wusong. She departed Wusong on 28 December 1912, investigating the landing facilities at Lingayen Gulf in the Philippines before being repaired at Olongapo in January 1913.

Rainbow shifted from Olongapo to Cavite on 26 January 1913 and remained in the Philippines until 28 March when she again set course for the coast of China. She transferred stores and men to Piscataqua (AT-49) at Wusong, then served as a station ship at Shanghai until 4 November 1913. After calling at Olongapo, she proceeded to Manila, embarked the Commander-in-Chief for transport to Shanghai, and served there as flagship from 21 December 1913 to 19 January 1914.

Rainbow resumed station ship duty at Cavite on 22 January 1914. She again became temporary flagship of the Commander-in-Chief at Cavite on 1 March 1914, but terminated this duty on 23 March 1914 when she shifted to Olongapo for overhaul, completed on 8 July 1914. She departed Manila Bay on 16 July 1914, taking refuge from a storm in Lingayen Gulf the 18th, before proceeding to survey the French Frigate Shoals, Hawaii (7-10 August 1914). She arrived at Honolulu 12 August, basing there for further survey work off the French Frigate Shoals until 14 November 1914. She then set course for San Francisco, arriving 24 November 1914 and shifting to the Mare Island Navy Yard the following day to prepare for inactivation. She decommissioned in the Mare Island Navy Yard on 24 December 1914.

=== Conversion to submarine tender, 1916–1918 ===
Rainbow was placed in commission, in reserve, at the Mare Island Navy Yard on 29 January 1916. She shifted to the U.S. Naval Training Station, Yerba Buena Island, 4 February 1916, serving as a receiving ship there until 14 December 1917. She then entered the Mare Island Navy Yard to fit out for service as a tender to the 6th Division, Submarine Force, U.S. Atlantic Fleet.

=== Submarine tender, 1918–1925 ===
On 2 April 1918 Rainbow, Lieutenant Paul H. Rice commanding, departed Mare Island to tend submarines L-6 (SS-45) and L-7 (SS-46) at Yerba Buena Island, California City, and San Pedro, California. On 3 May 1918 she departed San Pedro for the eastern seaboard in company with L-6 and L-7. She arrived in Charleston with the L-boats on 9 June 1918 and proceeded independently on the 21st for the Philadelphia Navy Yard, arriving on 24 June 1918.

Rainbow overhauled in the Philadelphia Navy Yard until 20 October 1918, then tended the O-boats of Submarine Division 10 at Newport, Rhode Island; Bridgeport, Connecticut; and Tompkinsville, New York. The tender sailed from Tompkinsville in company with Submarine Division 10, bound by way of Hampton Roads, Virginia, to Guantanamo Bay, Cuba, arriving on 7 January 1919.

Rainbow served as tender for Submarine Division 10 at Guantanamo until 10 March 1919; then cruised to Charlotte Amalie Harbor, St. Thomas, Virgin Islands, where the O-boats carried out daily practice on the target range until 16 April. After calling at San Juan, Puerto Rico, the tender and her submarines returned to New York on 1 May 1919.

Rainbow continued as a tender to Submarine Division 10 at Cold Spring Inlet, Cape May, New Jersey, from 14 May to 22 September 1919. She then sailed to Charleston, where she remained in commission, in reserve, until 13 February 1920. She entered the Boston Navy Yard on 18 February 1920 for overhaul and was placed in full commission there 1 July 1920 to serve as a tender to Submarine Division 12.

Reclassified AS-7 on 17 July 1920, Rainbow departed the Boston Navy Yard on 28 October 1920, made a brief call at the Portsmouth Navy Yard, Kittery, Maine, then reached Newport, Rhode Island, 6 November 1921 to commence tending the S-boats of Submarine Division 12. The submarine division shifted base to New York on 19 November and sailed the 30th bound by way of Key West, Guantanamo Bay, the Panama Canal and ports of Mexico, to San Diego, arriving on 9 February 1921.

Rainbow tended Submarine Division 12 on the California coast until 6 April 1921, then set course from San Francisco with the S-boats of Division 12 for Honolulu, arriving 17 April 1921. Tending operations in Hawaiian waters continued until 12 November 1921 when she set course with the S-boats for Apra Harbor, Guam (27-30 November), thence to Cavite, Philippine Islands, arriving on 6 December 1921.

Upon arrival at Cavite, Philippine Islands, Rainbow became the flagship of Submarine Flotilla 3 (later designated Submarine Division), Asiatic Fleet. She also served as tender to Submarine Division 12 and sometimes assisted Finch (AM-9) in tending the "boats" of Submarine Division 18. Except for a visit to Hong Kong (11-31 October 1921), she remained in the Philippines until 23 April 1923. She then sailed with the Submarine Divisions of the Asiatic Fleet and tender Finch to serve along the China Coast at Shanghai, Yantai, Qinhuangdao, Wusong, and Amoy.

Rainbow returned to Olongapo, Philippine Islands, from the coast of China on 10 September 1923, serving there and at Cavite until 24 June 1924. She again sailed from Cavite on 24 June 1924 in company with tender Finch and the S-boats of Divisions 12 and 18 to serve at Qingdao, Yantai, and Amoy until 20 September. She returned to Olongapo on 23 September 1924 and sailed 28 October for return to the western seaboard of the United States. She called at Sorsogon Bay, Luzon (29 September-3 October); Apra Harbor, Guam (6-17 November); Pearl Harbor (7-19 December); and reached the Mare Island Navy Yard on 31 December 1924.

Rainbow departed San Diego on 2 February 1925 to land Marine reinforcements at Corinto, Nicaragua (11-12 February), then proceeded by way of the Panama Canal, Guantanamo Bay, and Hampton Roads to the Philadelphia Navy Yard, arriving on 10 March 1925.

=== Decommissioning and sale, 1925–1928 ===
Rainbow was decommissioned in the Philadelphia Navy Yard on 11 July 1925. She remained inactive in the Philadelphia Navy Yard until her name was struck from the Navy list on 26 June 1928. She was sold for scrapping on 13 September 1928 to the Boston Iron Works, Baltimore, Maryland.
