= SS-45 =

SS-45, SS 45 or SS45 may refer to:

- SS-45 Missile, a surface-to-air missile of the Union of India Army
- USS L-6 (SS-45), a submarine of the United States Navy which saw service during World War I

and also:

- USS S-45 (SS-156), a submarine of the United States Navy commissioned in 1920
