= SS West Kasson =

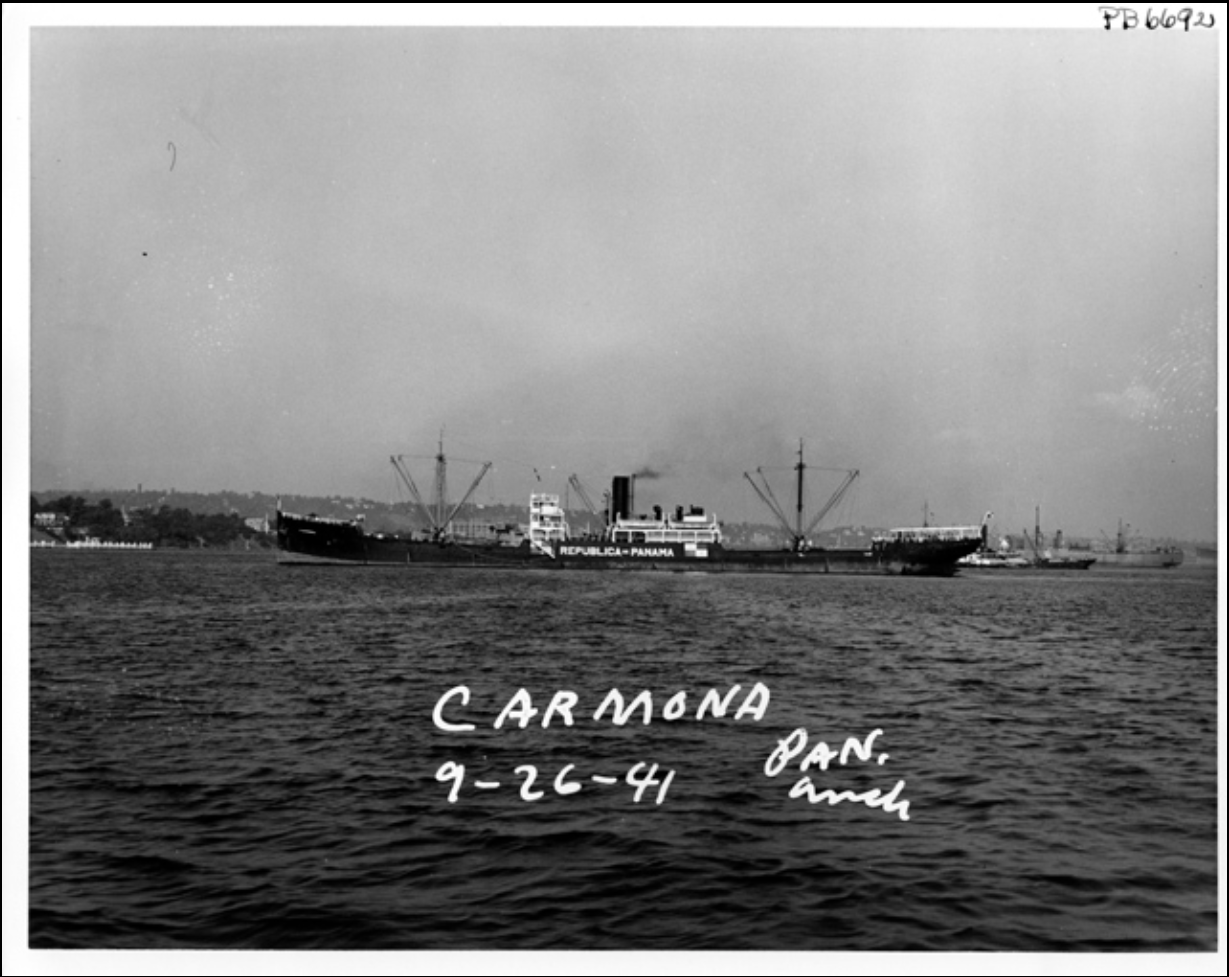
- SS Carmona in September 1941, showing its neutrality markings.

History

United States;Panama
- Name: West Kasson (1919–1926); Cuzco (1926–1940); Carmona (1940–1942)
- Owner: USSB (1919–1926); W. R. Grace & Co. (1926–1940); Compania de Vapores Cardina, S.A. (1940–1942)
- Operator: Pacific Mail Steamship Co. (1919–April 1921); Pacific Steamship Co. (June 1921–Dec 1921); Mississippi Shipping Co. (Dec 1921–May 1925); Carmona Steamship Co. (1940–1942)
- Port of registry: Los Angeles (1919–1926); New York (1926–1940); Panama City (1940–1942)
- Ordered: 10 July 1918
- Builder: Long Beach Shipbuilding Co., Long Beach
- Cost: $1,859,000.65
- Yard number: 130
- Laid down: 15 October 1918
- Launched: 15 March 1919
- Sponsored by: Mrs. John F. Craig
- Commissioned: 30 June 1919
- Maiden voyage: 29 July 1919
- Identification: US official number 218254; code letters LRMW (1919–33); call sign KIKM (1933–40); call sign HPPQ (1941–42)
- Fate: Sunk, 18 July 1942

General characteristics
- Type: Design 1019 Cargo ship
- Tonnage: 5,496 GRT; 3,443 NRT; 8,570 DWT
- Length: 410.5 ft (125.1 m)
- Beam: 54.3 ft (16.6 m)
- Depth: 27.2 ft (8.3 m)
- Installed power: 2800 Ihp, 359 Nhp
- Propulsion: Llewellyn Iron Works 3-cylinder triple expansion
- Speed: 10 1/2 knots (19.4 km/h; 12.1 mph)
- Crew: 45

West Kasson was a steam cargo ship built in 1918–1919 by Long Beach Shipbuilding Company of Long Beach for the United States Shipping Board (USSB) as part of the wartime shipbuilding program of the Emergency Fleet Corporation (EFC) to restore the nation's Merchant Marine. The vessel initially operated on the round-the-world route from the West Coast of the United States via East Asia and Spain before being shifted to serve the Gulf to Europe and South America trade in 1922. In 1926 she was sold to the W. R. Grace and Company and renamed Cuzco. In her new role the ship operated chiefly between the ports of the Pacific Northwest and various Chilean and Peruvian ports. In 1940 the ship was again sold and transferred into Panamanian registry and renamed Carmona. The vessel continued sailing between South America and the United States and was torpedoed and sunk by the German submarine U-160 on one of her regular trips in July 1942.

== Design and construction ==
After the United States entry into World War I, a large shipbuilding program was undertaken to restore and enhance shipping capabilities both of the United States and their Allies. As part of this program, EFC placed orders with nation's shipyards for a large number of vessels of standard designs. Most of these new vessels were known as the West ships as they were built by several shipyards on the West Coast of the United States and all were given names that began with the word West. Design 1019 cargo ship was among the designs adopted by USSB, and was a standard cargo freighter of approximately 8,800 deadweight tonnage designed by Theodore E. Ferris.

West Kasson was part of the order for eight vessels placed by USSB with the Long Beach Shipbuilding Co. on 10 July 1918 and was laid down on 15 October 1918 and launched on 15 March 1919 (yard number 130), with Mrs. John F. Craig, wife of John F. Craig, chairman of the board of directors of the shipbuilding company, being the sponsor. The launch was witnessed by a large crowd of 3,000 shipyard employees consisting of workers and management, and approximately 2,000 spectators. The vessel was launched approximately 80% complete with only her boilers and engine cylinders needed to be installed. Just as with many other vessels being built for the Shipping Board, her name was picked by Mrs. Woodrow Wilson who often chose Native American words for naming purposes.

Similar to all vessels of this class the ship had two main decks and was built on the three-island principle of ship construction. She had her machinery situated amidships and had five main holds which allowed for the carriage of a variety of goods and merchandise. The vessel also possessed all the modern machinery for quick loading and unloading of cargo from five large hatches, including ten winches and eleven booms. She was also equipped with wireless apparatus and submarine signal system and had electric lights installed along the decks.

As built, the ship was 410.5 feet (125.1 m) long (between perpendiculars) and 54.3 feet (16.6 m) abeam, and had a depth of 27.2 feet (8.3 m). West Kasson was originally assessed at 5,937 GRT and 4,525 NRT and had deadweight tonnage of approximately 8,570. The vessel had a steel hull and a single 2,500 ihp triple expansion steam engine, with cylinders of 24 1/2-inch (62 cm), 41 1/2-inch (105 cm) and 72-inch (180 cm) diameter with a 48-inch (120 cm) stroke that moved the ship at up to 10.5 knots (12.1 mph; 19.4 km/h). The steam for the engine was supplied by three Scotch marine boilers fitted for oil fuel.

The four hour long dock trial was successfully held on 25 June 1919 after which the ship sailed to San Pedro. The sea trials were held on June 28 in the channel just outside the harbor during which the ship performed satisfactorily. Following their successful completion, the ship was delivered to her owners and officially accepted by them on June 30.

== Operational history ==
=== Under USSB control (1919-1925) ===
Following delivery to the Shipping Board, West Kasson was allocated to the Pacific Mail Steamship Company, who inaugurated a round-the-world service to promote American shipping. The steamer then proceeded on her shakedown cruise to San Francisco for loading and arrived there on July 9. The next day the vessel was ordered to relocate for docking elsewhere and left her anchorage. During her trip West Kasson suddenly went on a spree of wild turns when the tiller apparently failed to obey the orders, and eventually the pilot was forced to order to stop the vessel and called in a tug to tow the ship to her new anchorage. Following this incident, the Shipping Board ordered the ship to have another trial trip which was conducted on July 18 and after its successful completion the ship was again accepted by USSB. West Kasson then loaded her cargo and departed San Francisco for Manila, Shanghai and Hong Kong on July 29. After visiting Chinese ports the steamer returned to Manila where she took on board a cargo of copra and from there proceeded to Java to load more of the same cargo and take it to Rotterdam. West Kasson reached her destination on November 23 and upon unloading her cargo left for Hampton Roads in ballast on December 4. The freighter was supposed to reach United States around December 15, but was unexpectedly delayed on her journey prompting widespread speculations about her fate. West Kasson finally arrived at Newport News on December 29, thus successfully concluding her five month long maiden voyage. Originally, the ship was supposed to stay in the Atlantic, but the high demand for cargo on the West Coast prompted the Pacific Mail Steamship Co. to send West Kasson west. She proceeded to Baltimore for loading in early January and after embarking 7,300 tons of general cargo sailed for California on 29 January 1920. After passing through the Panama Canal on February 5, the ship reached San Pedro on February 17 after largely an uneventful passage.

Following successful completion of a round the world scout trip through East Asia and the Mediterranean by West Kasson, Pacific Mail Steamship Co. decided to expand this service adding more vessels to the trade route. The freighter departed San Francisco for the inaugural round-the-world trip to a variety of ports in the Far East, India and the Mediterranean on 12 March 1920. She returned to Boston on July 30 bringing general cargo such as sugar from Java and cotton and skins from India to the East Coast ports. Upon discharging part of her cargo, West Kasson loaded at Boston and proceeded to New York and Baltimore to unload and load more cargo. She left Baltimore on September 4 and after passing through the Panama Canal arrived in San Francisco on 4 October 1920 successfully completing another round the world journey covering more than 28,000 miles in the process. West Kasson made one more round-the-world journey while under control of the Pacific Mail Steamship Co., returning to Baltimore on 11 March 1921 to discharge approximately 1,000 tons of manganese ore. On 10 April 1921 it was reported that the Pacific Mail Steamship Co. decided to return four large vessels, including West Kasson, to the Shipping Board citing lack of cargo in all of their foreign ports of service. The vessel arrived at San Pedro on April 20 and then proceeded to San Francisco where she remained berthed awaiting further assignment.

In June 1921 SS West Hartland who was supposed to take a large cargo of lumber to Japan collided with another steamer, SS Governor, and consequently was libeled and had to remain in port awaiting the trial. The Shipping Board dispatched West Kasson to Portland to take her place under control of the Pacific Steamship Company. After taking on board nearly 2,700,000 feet of fir and cedar lumber, West Kasson departed Portland on 5 July 1921 bound for Japanese ports of Kobe and Yokohama. Initially, the freighter was supposed to return directly to the West Coast, however, upon arrival in Japan at the end of July the vessel was rerouted to Singapore resulting in another round-the-world trip. West Kasson departed London for New York on 29 November 1921, however, on her way back 'she lost her propeller and was forced to put in into Bermuda on December 18 for repairs. She spent 59 days there being repaired before departing for Mobile on 15 February 1922. While in Bermuda, the ship was allocated to the Mississippi Shipping Company which operated two different lines from the Gulf ports, one to Le Havre, Antwerp and Ghent and the other to the east coast of South America.

After reaching New Orleans on February 22, West Kasson proceeded to load general cargo in several Gulf ports and cleared from Charleston on 5 April 1922 bound for Antwerp and Havre. She reached Le Havre on April 22 and after discharging her cargo sailed back to New Orleans in ballast on May 5. The steamer continued to operate from the Gulf ports of New Orleans, Mobile, Galveston, Port of Tampa and Charleston to Havre and Antwerp through 1926. She mostly carried cotton, wheat, case oil, phosphate rock and lumber on her transatlantic travels to Low Countries, usually returning home in ballast. For example, West Kasson arrived at Tampa on 20 March 1923 to load part cargo of 3,300 tons of phosphate rock for delivery to Dunkerque. Incidentally, on the same day the ship was raided by local law enforcement officers who confiscated between 6 and 7 pounds of opium. From mid 1923 through the end of 1924 she also made trips to various ports of Argentina, Brazil and Uruguay. For example, the ship left Port Arthur on 11 July 1923 loaded with case oil and rice bound for Buenos Aires and Montevideo. On her way back from South America she usually carried various agricultural and meat products as well as coffee. For example, the freighter left Brazilian ports of Rio de Janeiro, Santos and Vitória at the end of July 1924 carrying nearly 70,000 60-kilogram bags of coffee to New Orleans.

Early in 1925 the vessel returned to her travels to France and Belgium and sailed from New Orleans on 1 February 1925 fully laden with wheat, lumber and case oil bound for Le Havre and Antwerp. After discharging part of her cargo in Havre, West Kasson proceeded to Antwerp. On March 1 While docked there a fire ignited in her holds which burnt for several hours but was eventually contained. The ship suffered heavy damage amidships and had her entire engine room flooded, however, most of her cargo of wheat remained undamaged and was safely unloaded once the fire was completely extinguished. After completing all necessary repairs, the vessel departed Europe on April 18 for Mobile and arrived at New Orleans in May where she was returned to the Shipping Board.

=== W. R. Grace (1926-1940) ===
On 23 January 1926 it was reported that West Kasson together with another Shipping Board ship, SS West Inskip, was sold to W. R. Grace and Company. W. R. Grace paid $55,705 for West Kasson and was required as part of the sale to maintain regular service between the West Coast of the United States and the West Coast of South America for five years. The freighter was delivered to Grace Line in New Orleans and departed it on 18 March 1926 in ballast. After passing through the Panama Canal, she picked up part cargo of coffee and sugar in Central America and delivered it to San Francisco on April 13. West Kasson then immediately sailed out north to the Puget Sound ports to load up for her upcoming trip to South America. The vessel had her new cargo booms installed in Seattle before proceeding to Tacoma area to load flour, lumber and box shooks. She left Tacoma on May 4 bound for Pisco and Chilean ports of Valparaíso and Arica. The steamer reached her destination in mid-June and upon discharging her cargo she loaded 6,550 tons of nitrates and approximately 1,100 tons of copper ore. West Kasson then proceeded to Hawaii where she arrived on August 1 to unload her cargo of fertilizer. The vessel then continued to Tacoma where she arrived on August 23 to discharge ore for the local ASARCO smelter, successfully concluding her first full trip under new ownership. West Kasson immediately left on her second journey loaded with flour, lumber and box shooks for Peru and Chile on 13 September 1926. She sailed back from Callao on November 2 loaded again with nitrates and various ores. On December 6 while being off the southern coast of Mexico, West Kasson sent out a distress signal stating that she had fire in one of her forward holds but not requesting any assistance. The vessel's later messages stated that the fire was under control. Subsequently, the ship owners denied that there was any fire at all, as they claimed a chemical reaction between lead and silver ore concentrates produced fumes which were mistaken for fire. West Kasson safely reached San Pedro ten days without any signs of damage, and later proceeded north to load more cargo for South America. In late November W. R. Grace decided to change the names of all of their recently acquired vessels to various Inca names, with West Kasson becoming Cuzco.

The vessel continued serving roughly the same route through the end of her career with W. R. Grace. On her way down south the ship usually loaded lumber, wheat, flour and paper at various ports of the Pacific Northwest, then would proceed to San Pedro where case oil and general merchandise were loaded. On her trips up north she carried nitrates, chiefly nitrate of soda, in addition to various ores, such as copper, gold and silver. For example, in October 1929 the freighter brought into Tacomea 6,000 tons of copper ore, and in January 1932 Cuzco cleared out from the West Coast ports fully loaded with 1,500 tons of wheat, 1,500,000 feet of lumber in addition to other cargo and 250 tons of infusorial earth. In August 1928 W. R. Grace announced that several of their freighters will be equipped with refrigerating machinery. Cuzco was the first vessel to have such machinery installed in November of the same year, allowing her to carry approximately 250 tons of perishable goods, such as dairy products and produce. Following the installation, Cuzco was able to carry 2,300 cases of fresh eggs as well as butter and apples to Peru on one of her voyages in 1930.

In 1930 Post Office Department awarded W. R. Grace a contract to carry mail to various South American destinations. This resulted in extension of company's shipping services to include extra destinations both in Chile and Peru, with Cuzco becoming the first vessel to inaugurate such mail service for the company in July 1930. As part of the mail contract W. R. Grace placed an order for several new speedier vessels to take over the route. Early in 1932 the company realigned their services shifting six older ships, including Cuzco, to take over the Panama Mail Service Line route covering nearly twenty ports along the Central America and Mexico Pacific coast. In addition, all six vessels were to make stops and pick up cargo at Vancouver and had their passenger accommodations somewhat enlarged. Cuzco departed California in June 1932 to start her new service, carrying among other cargo a repaired fishing motor boat on her deck. She also had corrals erected both aft and fore for mules to be transported between ports along her new route. The new service went into full effect a year later when twenty ports were added to service including Corinto and Acapulco.

During her career Cuzco occasionally carried unusual cargo. For example, in September 1933 the vessel delivered about 24,000 pounds of aerial bombs destined for the Armed Forces of Honduras and El Salvador, and in November 1934 she brought back approximately 500 tons of sulfur from South America to San Pedro. In February 1939 she also transported part order of seven Northrop A-17 bombers from Northrop factory in California for the Peruvian Air Force. Even though Cuzco had limited passenger accommodations, she carried some notable people during her trips. For example, in May 1928 the vessel brought in Laura de la Puente Ganoza, one of the Peru's best dancers to study dance in Los Angeles. Similarly, in December 1934 the ship carried Willard Galbraith, a renowned diplomat, just appointed as a secretary of the US consulate in Tegucigalpa to assume his new post. Following a military coup against Nicaraguan president Juan Bautista Sacasa, Cuzco was delayed in Corinto on 6 June 1936 awaiting arrival of the exiled president and twelve people from his entourage. The ship then took Sacasa to La Libertad where he disembarked on June 9.

During her extensive career Cuzco had several mishaps. On 27 October 1935 while on one of her regular trip from San Pedro to Valparaíso, the ship went aground on Lempa shoals in Jiquilisco Bay on El Salvador's Pacific coast. The vessel was heavily pounded by the waves and started to list prompting the crew to abandon her. All crew was rescued by Gulf-Pacific Mail Line steamer SS Point Ancha where they remained for the duration of salvage work. Meanwhile, a salvage steamer Merritt was dispatched from Jamaica to assist in refloating operations, and a smaller one from sent from the Panama Canal area. Both tugs arrived on the scene in early November and after an inspection determined the vessel's hull was intact, an attempt to refloat the grounded steamer was made. After jettisoning part of Cuzco's deckload of lumber, she was successfully refloated on November 5 and proceeded under her own power to the Panama Canal for inspection and repairs.

On 28 January 1936 Cuzco arrived in Wilmington carrying her usual cargo of nitrates, sulfur and ore concentrates. Next day the unloading started using a clamshell bucket and a crane. During the unloading, the clamshell bucket produced sparks several times when hitting the sulfur rocks, and on one occasion such spark started a fire. The burning was fueled both by sulfur and treated ore concentrates and was threatening to get out of control and destroy the ship, however, the firemen were able to deploy two fireboats in time to quickly extinguish the blaze.

Late in 1939 the Maritime Commission (MARCOM) offered W. R. Grace to put three modern Type C2 vessels in operation between the West Coast and South America. In exchange, MARCOM was to get six World War I era steamers being operated by Grace Line as prepayment. While Grace Line eventually agreed to purchase new vessels for their South American operations, the deal with MARCOM did not include any of their aging ships. Instead, in March 1940 it was announced that W. R. Grace agreed to sell three of their vessels, Cuzco, Capac and Charcas to a Panama-based Compañía de Vapores Cardina, S.A, a subsidiary of Belgium-based Compagnie Continentale d’Importation. The new owners were going to engage in tramp shipping, mainly between the United States and Europe. At the time of sale Cuzco was on her regular journey to Central and South America transporting her usual cargo including five Arabian horses bought by the government of Colombia. After loading her usual cargo of nitrates and copper and vanadium ore the vessel passed through the Panama Canal on May 5 and continued to New York where she was transferred into Panamanian registry.

=== In Panamanian registry (1940-1942) ===
Following arrival in New York in mid-May 1940 Cuzco was renamed Carmona and put under operational control of a newly created company, Carmona Steamship Company. Due to developing disaster in France any potential trips to Europe became impossible. Carmona then sailed from New York for New Orleans where she loaded 7,000 tons of salt for delivery to Tokoyama. The freighter passed through the Panama Canal on 20–21 July 1940 and after making a short stop in Los Angeles in early August continued to Japan. She returned to Seattle on 7 February 1941 and upon loading her cargo the vessel left for South Africa on February 17. The ship then proceeded to the Atlantic where she entered a trade route from the east coast of South America to New York.

=== Sinking ===
SS Carmona (Master Charles Beke) was en route from Buenos Aires to the US with a cargo of 7,138 tons of linseed in bulk. The ship was sailing alone and unarmed. At 11:27 local time on July 18, 1942, in position 10°58′N 61°20′W, southeast of Trinidad, German submarine U-160 under command of Georg Lassen launched four torpedoes and hit Carmona on the starboard side. The first torpedo struck the engine room, and killed four crew members. The second hit at #2 hatch about 10 minutes later, and the other two struck shortly after. The ship turned on her side and sunk at 12:00 noon. The Master ordered to abandon ship and the survivors were picked up by a United States Navy Patrol Boat USS YPC-68 and taken to Port of Spain. There were 31 survivors.
