= Lansing Shoals Light Station =

Lighthouse in Michigan, United States

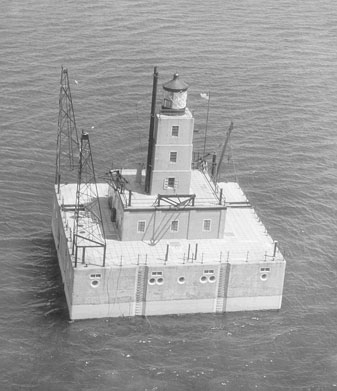
- Location: NE Lake Michigan, 6.3 miles (10.1 km) SE of Point Patterson
- Coordinates: 45°54′12″N 85°33′42″W

Tower
- Foundation: concrete and steel crib
- Construction: reinforced concrete and steel
- Automated: 1976
- Height: 59 feet (18 m)
- Shape: square
- Markings: natural
- Heritage: National Register of Historic Places listed place

Light
- First lit: 1928
- Focal height: 69 feet (21 m)
- Lens: third order Fresnel lens (original), 7.5-inch (190 mm) acrylic optic (current)
- Range: 14 nautical miles; 26 kilometres (16 mi)
- Characteristic: FI W 10s
- Lansing Shoals Light Station
- U.S. National Register of Historic Places
- Nearest city: Newton Township, Mackinac County, Michigan
- Area: less than one acre
- Built by: U.S. Lighthouse Service
- MPS: Light Stations of the United States MPS
- NRHP reference No.: 05000979
- Added to NRHP: September 6, 2005

The Lansing Shoals Light Station is a lighthouse located in northeastern Lake Michigan, 6.3 miles (10.1 km) southeast of Point Patterson, in Newton Township, Mackinac County, Michigan. It was listed on the National Register of Historic Places in 2005.

== History: Lightships ==
The Lansing Shoals are located at the northern end of a narrow shipping passage that ships are forced to navigate on the Lake Michigan side of the Straits of Mackinac. In the 1890s, iron ore shipments from Escanaba, Michigan increased significantly, putting pressure on the Lighthouse Board to improve the lighting in the area. They responded by moving the lightship LV55 from Simons Reef to Lansing Shoals in mid-1900. LV55 was one of three identical lightvessels authorized by Congress in 1889. These vessels were originally to be moored at Simmons Reef, White Shoals, and Grays Reef. The three vessels, designated LV55, LV56, and LV57, were constructed by Blythe Craig Shipbuilding Company of Toledo, Ohio, and were put in service in late 1891.

The removal of LV55 to Lansing Shoals was regarded as only a temporary solution, however. In 1908, the Lighthouse Board requested an appropriation for a permanent structure to be built at the location. The request was not approved, and LV55 stayed on station until 1920, when her hull was found to be unrepairable and she was removed from service. At that time, LV98, a lightvessel built by the Racine-Truscott-Shell Lake Boat Company of Muskegon, Michigan in 1914, was tasked to serve in its place. However, the Great Lakes fleet was operating further and further into the winter season, leaving a substantial shipping time in early spring and late fall where the lightvessel could not be on station due to ice buildup. Thus, replacing the ship with a permanent light station again became a priority.

== History: Light station ==
In 1926, Congress approved expenditure for a permanent station. A site was located, and in 1927 work began on constructing a foundation. On October 6, 1928, the station was lit for the first time and LV98 was removed from duty.

The station was staffed until the summer of 1976, at which time the original third order Fresnel lens was replaced with an acrylic optic, the station was secured, and an automated system was put in place. The original Fresnel lens is now on display at the Michigan History Museum in Lansing, Michigan. The light is still in use as a navigational aid.

== Description ==
The Lansing Shoals Light Station sits on a bed of stone, with concrete caissons forming the foundation. Reinforced concrete forms the crib, within which is a basement 69 feet (21 m) on a side. The basement is divided into two sections: one for machinery and one for the crew's sleeping quarters. The basement originally had 27 porthole-style windows 24 inches (610 mm) in diameter, but all windows in the structure were sealed after the light was automated.

The ceiling of the basement, 20 feet (6.1 m) above the level of the lake, forms the main deck of the light. A house 37 feet (11 m) square and 12 feet 8 inches (3.86 m) high sits in the center of the deck. This house originally held the kitchen, dining room, and other crew living quarters. In the center of the house sits a three-story square tower, tapering from 13 feet (4.0 m) at the base to 11 feet (3.4 m) at the top. Both house and tower are constructed from sheathed concrete. A circular cast iron lantern sits on top of the tower; it originally held a third order Fresnel lens with a 500 Watt lamp.
