= United States lightship LV-57 =

American lightvessel and National Historic Site

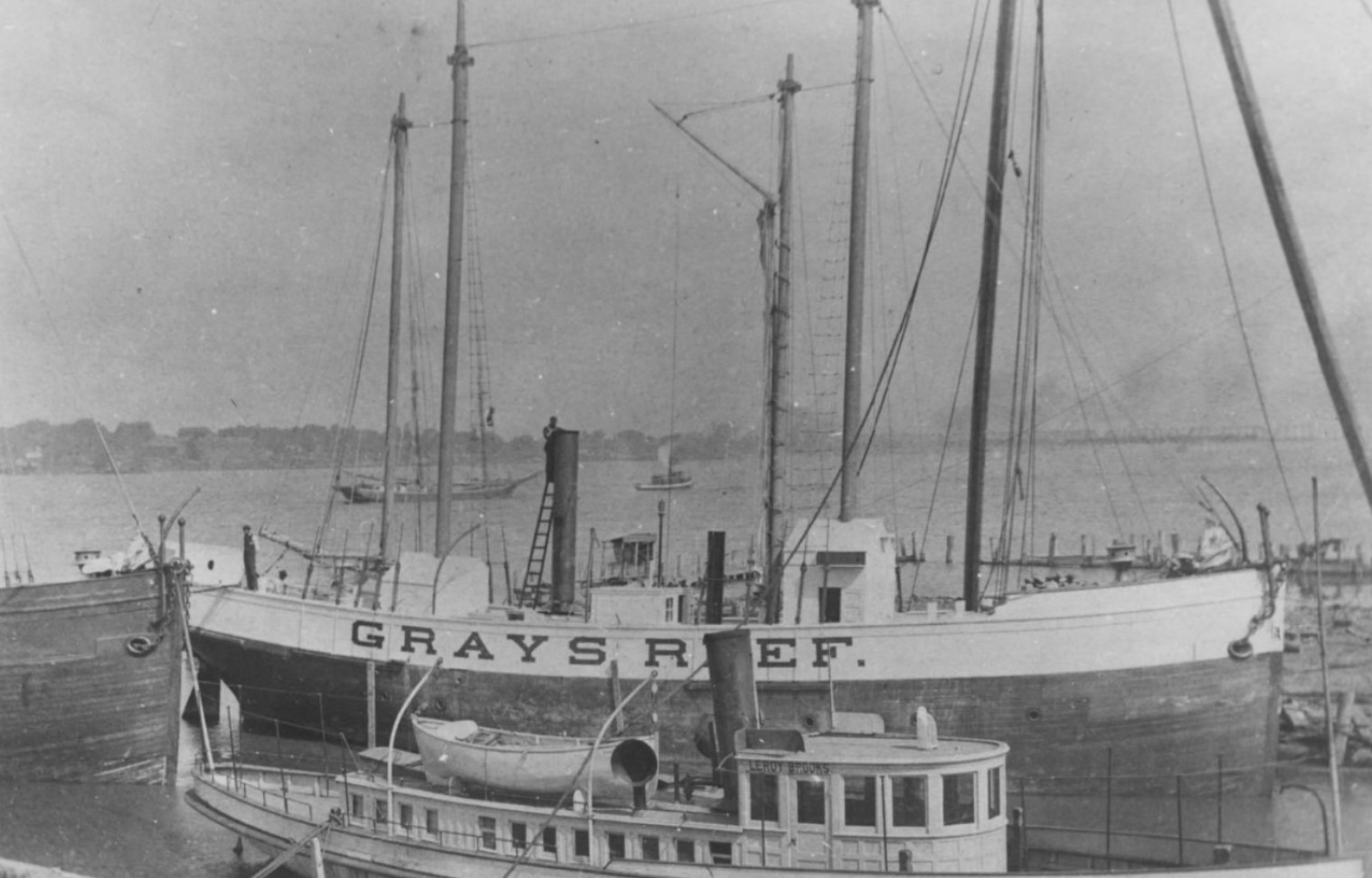
- LV-57 at Toledo, Ohio

History

United States
- Name: LV-57
- Builder: Craig Shipbuilding
- Launched: 1891
- In service: 1891
- Out of service: 1924
- Fate: Wrecked

General characteristics
- Type: Lightvessel
- Tonnage: 130 gross register tons; 101 net register tons
- Length: 90 ft (27 m)
- Beam: 20 ft (6.1 m)
- Depth: 8 ft (2.4 m)

National Register of Historic Places data
LIGHT VESSEL No. 57 (Shipwreck)
U.S. National Register of Historic Places
Location within Wisconsin Location within the United States
Location	600 ft (180 m) south of South Shore Park's northern tip right along the shore
Nearest city	Milwaukee, Wisconsin
Coordinates	43.001533°N 87.8855°W
Built	1891
Architect	Craig Shipbuilding Company
Architectural style	Lightvessel
NRHP reference No.	91001823
Added to NRHP	December 16, 1996

LV-57 was an American lightship that was built in 1891 and served on the Great Lakes (Lake Michigan), west of the Straits of Mackinac (the reef is now the site of the Grays Reef Light), from her construction to her retirement in 1924. She was partly dismantled, used as a clubhouse, and wrecked by a storm after 1928. On December 16, 1996 the remains of LV-57 were listed on the National Register of Historic Places.

== History ==
LV-57 was built in 1891 in Toledo, Ohio by Craig Shipbuilding at a cost of $14,225. She was one of three federal lightvessels designed for use during the navigational season as an experiment to avoid the construction of a much more expensive permanent lighthouse. Her wooden hull was 90 feet (27 m) long, and was built of white oak planks that were fastened together with 5.8-inch (150 mm) iron spikes. Her beam was 20 feet (6.1 m) wide, and her draft was 9 feet (2.7 m) deep. She also had a gross register tonnage of 130 tons, with a net register tonnage of 101 tons. She had two masts, with clusters of three oil-burning lens lanterns that were hoisted onto each masthead. She had a top speed of 8 knots (15 km/h; 9.2 mph).

From 1891 to 1923 LV-57 was stationed at Gray's Reef, a ridge of rock 18 miles (29 km) west of the Mackinac Bridge in northeastern Lake Michigan. Due to the increased ship traffic in the area, it was decided that she would be moved to Gray's Reef to make the area safer.

== Later history ==
LV-57 was retired in 1923. In 1924 she was sold to the South Shore Yacht Club, Milwaukee, Wisconsin, and was no longer in the federal government's records. Later she was condemned, dismantled, and moved to Milwaukee. She lay in Norwegian Alley for several years. In 1928 LV-57 was taken to South Shore Beach, Milwaukee and used as a clubhouse until she was wrecked by a storm several years later.

A November 28, 1926 issue of the Milwaukee Journal Sentinel reported that LV-57 was bought by a junk dealer who "removed the pig iron and sold it with all else removable and salable."

== Wreck of LV-57 ==
The remains of LV-57 were discovered by divers along the shore, about 600 feet (180 m) south off the tip of South Shore Park. One of the divers reported that while most of the ship was buried under silt in 6 to 12 feet (1.8 to 3.7 m) of water, with some parts of her hull poking through the lake floor.

== Legacy ==
In November 2018, the Sprecher Brewery released a beer named after LV-57.
