= USS City of South Haven =

United States Navy WWI-era transport ship

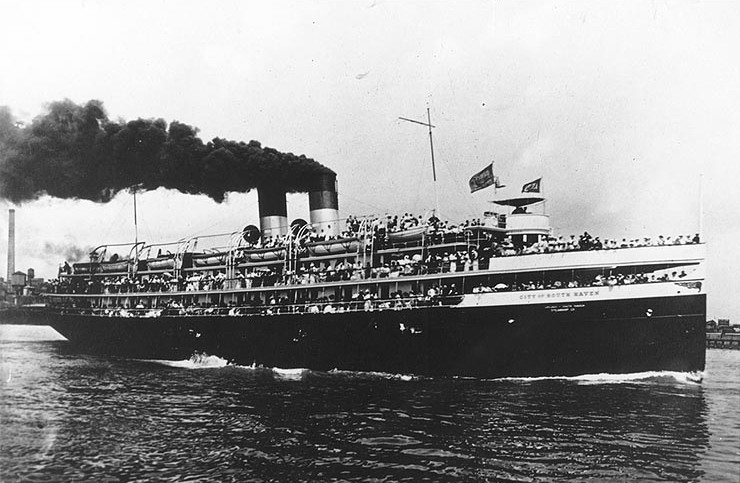
- SS City of South Haven pre-World War I, with her decks crowded with passengers.

History

United States
- Name: SS City of South Haven
- Owner: Dunkley-Williams and Company of South Haven, Michigan
- Builder: Craig Shipbuilding of Toledo, Ohio
- Launched: 1903
- Fate: Damaged by fire 3 December 1935, scrapped 1942

General characteristics
- Tonnage: 1719 gross register tons

USS City of South Haven (ID-2527) was a transport ship for the United States Navy at the close of World War I. Before the war, she was a passenger steamship that sailed as SS City of South Haven on the Great Lakes. In post-war civilian service she operated as SS City of Miami between Florida and Cuba before returning to the Great Lakes as SS E.G. Crosby. She was scrapped in 1942 following a fire.

== Construction ==
SS City of South Haven was built in 1903 by Craig Shipbuilding of Toledo, Ohio for Dunkley-Williams and Company of South Haven, Michigan. She was sold to the Chicago and South Haven Steamship Company of Chicago, Illinois in 1906. City of South Haven operated commercially on the Great Lakes, primarily Lake Michigan, until early 1918.

== World War I ==
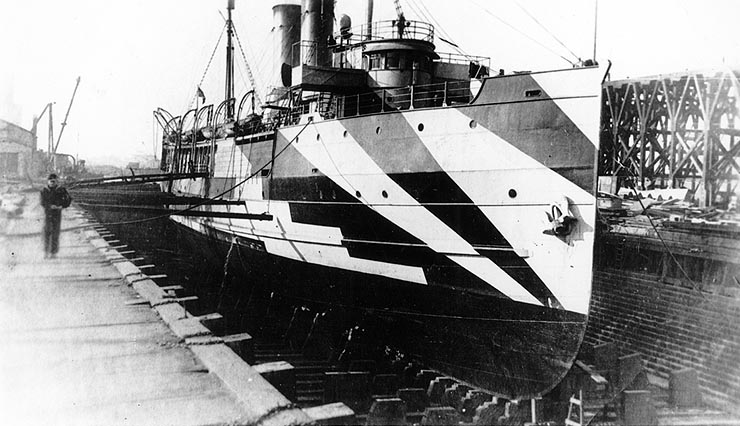
USS City of South Haven in wartime dazzle camouflage

The United States Navy purchased SS City of South Haven on 19 April 1918 at Manistee, Michigan. She was converted for naval service at Kraft Shipyard and Dry Dock Company of Chicago, Illinois. USS City of South Haven was commissioned on 9 November 1918, two days before the Armistice that ended World War I. Commanded by Lieutenant Commander A. C. Wilvers of the United States Naval Reserve Force, she left Chicago on 29 November and arrived in Boston, Massachusetts on 13 December, where she was to be fitted and sent to Europe for cross-channel transport. However, with the end of hostilities the ship, no longer needed, was placed on the sale list, sold to the Goodrich Transit Company of Chicago, struck from the Navy List on 27 September 1919, decommissioned on 3 December, and delivered to her new owners.

== Post-war service ==
Following her brief stint in the Navy, SS City of South Haven would change names and ownership a number of times before finally returning to the Great Lakes. Goodrich Transit sold her in 1919 to J.G. Crosby of Chicago. J.G. Crosby in turn sold her to the Havana-American Steamship Company of Miami, Florida on 3 February 1920. Her name was then changed to SS City of Miami and she was resold on 21 May to A.O. Anderson and Company of Miami. During this period, she would operate between Florida and Cuba. City of Miami returned to her former owners on 17 June 1920 when she was again sold to the Havana-American Steamship Company. The United States Marshals Service next sold her to the O'Brien Brothers Towing Company of Miami on 6 November 1922. Ten days later City of Miami was sold to the Havana Navigation Corporation of Miami. The following year she was sold to the Crosby Transportation Company of Milwaukee, Wisconsin and renamed SS E. G. Crosby. This sale would return her to the Great Lakes. In 1924, she would be sold for the final time to the Wisconsin and Michigan Transportation Company of Milwaukee. She was laid up in 1931 and suffered massive fire damage in a boneyard at Sturgeon Bay, Wisconsin on 3 December 1935. As a result, she was scrapped in 1942.
