= USS Ozaukee =

Cargo ship of the United States Navy

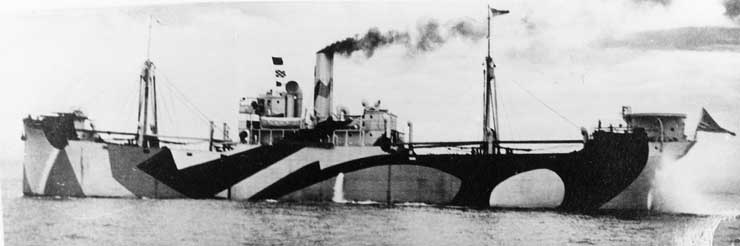
- USS Ozaukee (ID-3429) around the time of her completion in September 1918.

History

United States
- Name: USS Ozaukee
- Namesake: Previous name retained
- Builder: Long Beach Shipbuilding Company, Long Beach, California
- Launched: 5 June 1918
- Completed: September 1918
- Acquired: September 1918
- Commissioned: 30 September 1918
- Decommissioned: 3 April 1919
- Fate: Transferred to United States Shipping Board 3 April 1919; Scrapped 1929

General characteristics
- Type: Cargo ship
- Tonnage: 4,045 Gross register tons
- Displacement: 8,480 tons (normal)
- Length: 354 ft (108 m)
- Beam: 48 ft (15 m)
- Draft: 22 ft 4 in (6.81 m)
- Propulsion: Steam engine
- Speed: 10.5 knots
- Complement: 62

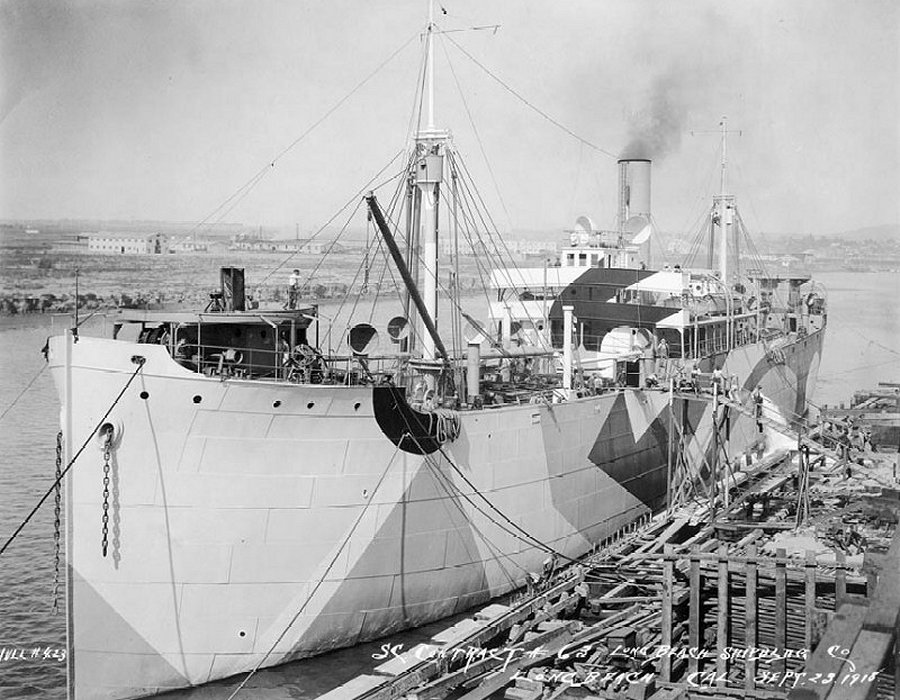
USS Ozaukee (ID-3439) fitting out at the shipyard of the Long Beach Shipbuilding Company at Long Beach, California, on 23 September 1918.

USS Ozaukee (ID-3439) was a United States Navy cargo ship in commission from 1918 to 1919.

== Construction, acquisition, and commissioning ==
SS Ozaukee was built in 1918 as a Design 1021 commercial cargo ship by the Long Beach Shipbuilding Company at Long Beach, California, for the Emergency Fleet Corporation of the United States Shipping Board. Upon her completion in September 1918, the U.S. Navy acquired her from the Shipping Board on a bareboat charter basis. Assigned the naval registry identification number 3439, she was commissioned on 30 September 1918 as USS Ozaukee (ID-3439) at San Pedro, California.

== Operational history ==
Fitted out for service with the Naval Overseas Transportation Service, Ozaukee departed the United States West Coast on 9 October 1918 bound for Chile. At Arica, Chile, she took on nitrates and steamed via the Panama Canal to Jacksonville, Florida, where she arrived on 7 December 1918. Ozaukee then carried a U.S. Shipping Board cargo from Charleston, South Carolina, to Philadelphia, Pennsylvania.

At the end of January 1919, Ozaukee departed Philadelphia to cross the Atlantic Ocean to deliver oil and tobacco to London in the United Kingdom. When she was about 700 nautical miles (1,296 kilometers) east of Philadelphia her steering gear carried away in heavy weather. Her crew rigged temporary steering gear and she completed the trip, arriving at London in mid-February 1919. In March 1919 she made the return voyage from London, arriving at Philadelphia on 15 March 1919.

== Decommissioning and disposal ==
Ozaukee was decommissioned at Philadelphia on 3 April 1919. The Navy returned her to the U.S. Shipping Board the same day. Once again SS Ozaukee, she remained in the custody of the Shipping Board until she was scrapped in 1929.
