= SS Haleakala =

History

United States
- Name: Haleakala
- Namesake: Haleakalā
- Owner: USSB
- Operator: Pacific Mail Steamship Co. (1919–October 1920); Sudden & Christensen (Nov 1920–Feb 1921); International Freighting Corporation (Apr 1922–1926)
- Port of registry: Los Angeles
- Ordered: 10 July 1918
- Builder: Long Beach Shipbuilding Co., Long Beach
- Cost: $1,750,000
- Yard number: 134
- Laid down: 3 February 1919
- Launched: 13 September 1919
- Sponsored by: Mrs. Violet Makee
- Commissioned: 10 December 1919
- Maiden voyage: 6 January 1920
- Identification: US official number 219333; code letters LVBK
- Fate: Disappeared, September 1926

General characteristics
- Type: Design 1019 Cargo ship
- Tonnage: 5,958 GRT; 4,512 NRT; 8,538 DWT
- Length: 410.5 ft (125.1 m)
- Beam: 54.3 ft (16.6 m)
- Depth: 27.2 ft (8.3 m)
- Installed power: 2800 Ihp, 359 Nhp
- Propulsion: Owens, Hooven & Rentschler 3-cylinder triple expansion
- Speed: 11 knots (20 km/h; 13 mph)

Haleakala was a steam cargo ship built in 1919 by Long Beach Shipbuilding Company of Long Beach for the United States Shipping Board (USSB) as part of the wartime shipbuilding program of the Emergency Fleet Corporation (EFC) to restore the nation's Merchant Marine. The vessel was first employed in the Pacific trade before being briefly laid up. She was reactivated in 1922 and entered the South American trade connecting the ports of Argentina and Brazil with a variety of ports in the Northeastern United States. In September 1926 while on one of her regular trips, she disappeared without a trace, possibly foundering in the hurricane with the loss of all hands.

== Design and construction ==
After the United States entry into World War I, a large shipbuilding program was undertaken to restore and enhance shipping capabilities both of the United States and their Allies. As part of this program, EFC placed orders with nation's shipyards for a large number of vessels of standard designs. Most of these new vessels were known as the West ships as they were built by several shipyards on the West Coast of the United States and all were given names that began with the word West. Design 1019 cargo ship was among the designs adopted by USSB, and was a standard cargo freighter of approximately 8,800 deadweight tonnage designed by Theodore E. Ferris.

Haleakala was part of the order for eight vessels placed by USSB with the Long Beach Shipbuilding Co. on 10 July 1918 and was laid down at the shipbuilder's yard on 3 February 1919 and launched on 13 September 1919 (yard number 134), with Mrs. Robert A. Smith, formerly Miss Violet Makee of Ulupalakua Ranch on Maui, being the sponsor. Originally the vessel were to be named West Kaw but thanks to over-subscription to the Fourth Liberty Loan by the residents of Maui, USSB deferred naming rights to them to recognize their contribution. The launch was witnessed by several thousand people, mostly workers of the shipyard. The vessel was launched approximately 80% complete, and was expected to be finished in sixty days.

Similar to all vessels of this class the ship had two main decks and was built on the three-island principle of ship construction. She had her machinery situated amidships and had five main holds which allowed for the carriage of a variety of goods and merchandise. The vessel also possessed all the modern machinery for quick loading and unloading of cargo from five large hatches, including ten winches and eleven booms. She was also equipped with wireless apparatus and submarine signal system and had electric lights installed along the decks.

As built, the ship was 410.5 feet (125.1 m) long (between perpendiculars) and 54.3 feet (16.6 m) abeam, and had a depth of 27.2 feet (8.3 m). Haleakala was originally assessed at 5,958 GRT and 4,512 NRT and had deadweight tonnage of approximately 8,538. The vessel had a steel hull and a single 2,800 ihp triple expansion steam engine, with cylinders of 24 1/2-inch (62 cm), 41 1/2-inch (105 cm) and 72-inch (180 cm) diameter with a 48-inch (120 cm) stroke that moved the ship at up to 11 knots (13 mph; 20 km/h). The steam for the engine was supplied by three Scotch marine boilers fitted both for coal and oil fuel.

The sea trials were held on 2 and 3 December and, after their successful completion, the ship sailed into San Pedro to load part cargo destined for East Asia. While there Haleakala was examined by the Shipping Board representatives and officially accepted by them on 10 December 1919. The ship then continued on to San Francisco where she were to load the rest of her cargo.

== Operational history ==
While Haleakala was nearing her completion, she was allocated by the Shipping Board to Pacific Mail Steamship Company to operate between California and India. The ship loaded part of her cargo at Los Angeles which consisted mostly of general merchandise but also included hundreds of American-made motorcycles and fifty automobiles and continued to San Francisco. After finishing loading the rest of her cargo, the freighter sailed from San Francisco on 6 January 1920 bound for Manila. The vessel made a short stop for bunkers at Honolulu where the crew was given a warm welcome and taught how to properly pronounce their ship's name. Haleakala reached Manila on 5 February 1920 and from there proceeded to visit the ports of Saigon, Singapore, Calcutta and Colombo. Aside from her regular oriental cargo, the ship carried back home a large number of various exotic animals such as monkeys, orangutan, tigers and a 100 year old elephant destined to be sold to zoos around the country. During the trip an elephant died and had to be buried in the ocean, and monkeys got free and the crew was forced to shoot the orangutan when he tried to engage the reverse gear. On her way back Haleakala also met another Shipping Board steamer, SS West Selene, who lost two of her propeller blades and was drifting helplessly. Haleakala took the stricken ship into tow and safely brought her into Honolulu where West Selene was repaired. The vessel returned to San Francisco on 29 April 1920, thus successfully completing her maiden voyage. Following her arrival, four more monkeys escaped from the freighter and after swimming for about an hour made it ashore under the wharves where they joined an existing monkey tribe. After conducting one more trip to India and the Philippines, Pacific Mail Steamship Co. returned Haleakala to the USSB in October 1920 due to significant overabundance of available tonnage and scarcity of cargo.

At about the same time, Sudden & Christensen decided to charter a steamer for one trip from the Pacific Northwest to the United Kingdom and chose to take Haleakala as she was readily available. The ship left San Francisco loaded with a large cargo of fuel oil, and upon reaching Portland embarked a cargo of lumber destined for London and West Hartlepool. After completing the voyage the ship returned to New York in ballast on 19 February 1921 and was laid up as the shipping crisis was still ongoing.

On 13 April 1922 EFC announced that Haleakala was allocated to the International Freighting Corporation to be used in the East Coast of the United States to east coast of South America service. Upon loading, the vessel cleared out from Philadelphia on 12 May 1922 bound for Buenos Aires and various Brazilian ports via Jacksonville. She reached Buenos Aires on 6 July, and then continued on to Rosario and Rio de Janeiro loading various cargo such as fertilizer, manganese ore and coffee. Haleakala returned to Baltimore on 2 September, concluding the first trip for her new operators. The freighter continued serving the same general route for the rest of her career. On her trips south she usually carried case oil and various general merchandise in addition to occasional machinery pieces. For example, in January 1925 Haleakala transported eight locomotives to Brazil as part of her load. On her way north Haleakala transported mainly coffee from Brazilian ports of Santos, Rio de Janeiro and Bahia. In addition, she also carried other agricultural products such as cocoa, hides, wool, quebracho and animal bones. For example, in October 1923 the freighter brought near record load of coffee to Boston in addition to general cargo. Similarly she brought in another large cargo of coffee, wool and hides to Boston in July 1924.

=== Disappearance ===
Haleakala cleared out from Philadelphia on 21 August 1926 laden with case oil, sugar and structural steel bound for Montevideo. The steamer made a call at Newport News where she loaded coal, lumber and general merchandise to complete her cargo. The ship entered Hampton Roads for bunkers and sailed out on 3 September 1926. The vessel was under command of captain John H. Pratt and had a crew of 38. Captain Fischer of the Danish steamer Nevada communicated with Haleakala at about 23:00 on 8 September 1926 in what would prove to be its last transmission, with Captain Pratt identifying the ships approximate position as 26°N 63°W (about 1,050 miles (1,690 km) east of the U.S. city of Miami). Fischer would report later that he had been unable to communicate with Haleakala the next day.

Haleakala was supposed to arrive at her destination by early October, but she never showed up at Montevideo, and, even though she was equipped with wireless, no messages were received from her. Upon arrival of the Nevada at Buenos Aires on 16 October, Captain Fischer reported his 8 September communication with Haleakala. Investigators concluded that Haleakala had run into ran into a strong hurricane that swept through the Bahamas and Florida in the first week of September and that the ship had foundered with the loss of her entire crew.
