= Design 1006 ship =

Wood-hulled cargo ship design

Class overview
- Name: EFC Design 1006
- Builders: National Shipbuilding Company
- Operators: United States Shipping Board; National Oil Transportation Company
- Built: 1918–19 (USSB); 1920 (National Oil Transportation Co.)
- Planned: 40
- Completed: 15 (12 for USSB, 2 as tankers, 1 as a barge)
- Canceled: 28

General characteristics
- Type: Cargo ship
- Tonnage: 4,700 dwt (design) 5,000 dwt (completed)
- Length: 300 ft 0 in (91.44 m)
- Beam: 48 ft 0 in (14.63 m)
- Draft: 28 ft 6 in (8.69 m)
- Propulsion: triple-expansion engine, 296 nhp, single-screw

The Design 1006 ship (full name Emergency Fleet Corporation Design 1006) was a wood-hulled cargo ship design approved for production by the United States Shipping Board's Emergency Fleet Corporation (EFC) in World War I. They were referred to as the "Daugherty"-type after A. A. Daugherty, the president of the National Shipbuilding Company. The USSB ordered a total of 40 hulls from three shipyards: National Shipbuilding Company of Orange, Texas shipyard (28 ordered, 16 cancelled); Union Bridge & Construction Company of Morgan City, Louisiana shipyard (6 hulls ordered, 6 cancelled); and Dirks Blodgett Shipbuilding Company of Pascagoula, Mississippi (6 hulls ordered but built as Design 1001). The design was altered by National Shipbuilding increasing the deadweight to 5,000 tons (the official designation was changed to Design 1056). Only 12 were completed for the USSB while two were built as tankers (A.A. Daugherty - ON 220746; and P.J. Reilly - ON 220969) in 1920 for the National Oil Transportation Company of Port Arthur, Texas and one as a barge (W. E. Ebsen - ON 219455).
