= Design 1075 ship =

Wood-hulled cargo ship design

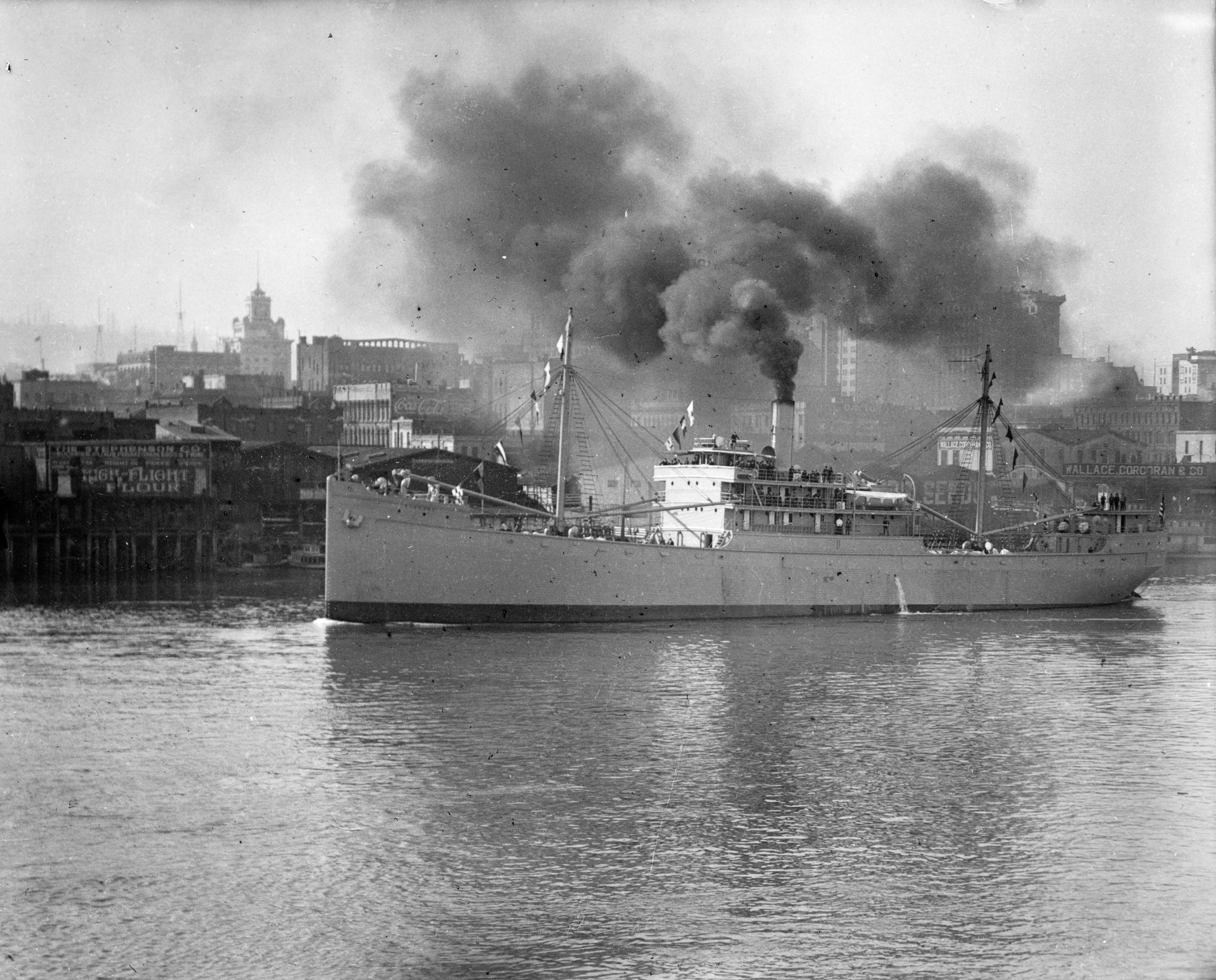
- Design 1075 ship SS Bushong on a Congressional party trip, circa 1919

Class overview
- Name: EFC Design 1075
- Builders: G. M. Standifer Construction Corporation, Vancouver, Washington
- Built: 1919 (USSB)
- Planned: 16
- Completed: 6
- Canceled: 10

General characteristics
- Type: Cargo ship
- Tonnage: 2,848 GRT; 4,326 LT DWT
- Length: 307.0 ft (93.6 m) (overall); 295.4 ft (90.0 m) (p/p)
- Beam: 45.6 ft (13.9 m)
- Draft: 23.25 ft (7.09 m)
- Depth: 26.0 ft (7.9 m)
- Installed power: Two coal-fired watertube boilers, triple-expansion steam engine, 1,400 ihp (1,000 kW)
- Propulsion: Single screw
- Speed: 8 knots (15 km/h; 9.2 mph)
- Crew: 44

The Design 1075 ship (full name Emergency Fleet Corporation Design 1075) was a wood-hulled cargo ship design approved for production by the United States Shipping Board's Emergency Fleet Corporation (EFC) in World War I. The ships were referred to as a "modified Ballin type", as all were a modified version of the Design 1011 ship designed by naval architect Fred A. Ballin. They were built by the G. M. Standifer Construction Corporation in Vancouver, Washington.

== Background ==
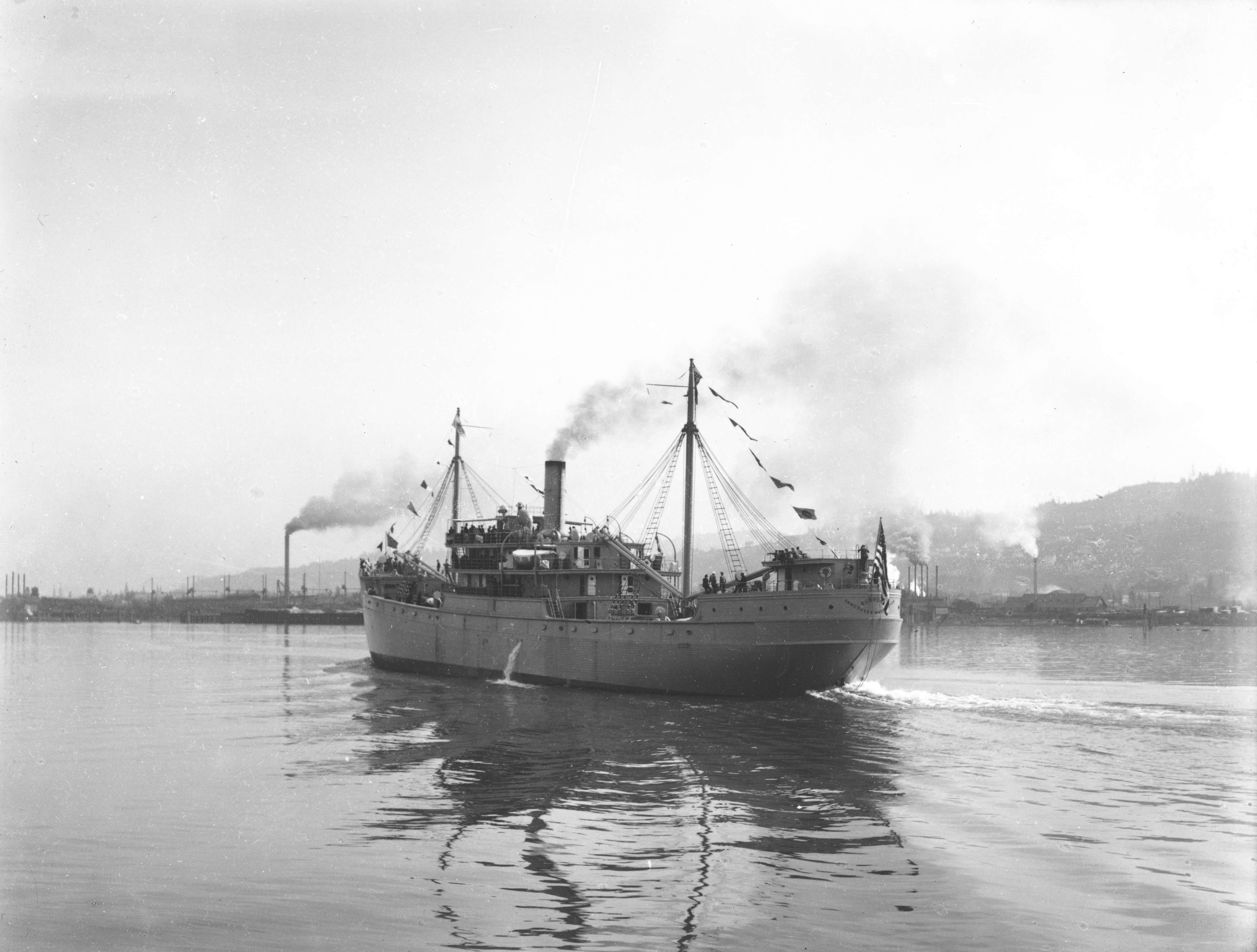
Another view of Bushong on the same occasion.

The Design 1075 ships used the same construction technique as Ballin's Design 1011 ships: to add strength, the wooden hull frames were covered with a skin of double-diagonal wooden planks and the hull's upper edge was reinforced with steel plates. Each Design 1075 ship measured 307.0 feet (93.6 m) in overall length, 295.4 feet (90.0 m) in length between perpendiculars, 45.6 feet (13.9 m) in beam, and 26.0 feet (7.9 m) in hull depth, with a load draft of 23.25 feet (7.09 m). Tonnage was 2,848 gross register tons (GRT) and 4,326 long tons deadweight (DWT). Propulsion was provided by a triple-expansion steam engine of 1,400 indicated horsepower (1,000 kW), fed by two coal-fired water-tube boilers; this engine drove a single screw, giving a speed of 8 knots (15 km/h; 9.2 mph). The crew complement was 44.

Of the twelve ships ordered from G. M. Standifer, only six were completed; these were delivered to the EFC in 1919. Four other ships were ordered from the Kiernan & Kern Shipbuilding Company in Portland, Oregon but were canceled after the end of the war.
