= Design 1116 ship =

Wood-hulled cargo ship design

Class overview
- Name: EFC Design 1116
- Builders: Grays Harbor Motorship Company, Aberdeen, Washington
- Built: 1919
- Planned: 8
- Completed: 3
- Canceled: 4

General characteristics
- Type: Cargo ship
- Tonnage: 3,132 gross register tons (GRT); 4,100 long tons deadweight (DWT)
- Length: 272.8 ft (83.1 m)
- Beam: 49.3 ft (15.0 m)
- Depth: 25.6 ft (7.8 m)
- Propulsion: 1400 hp
- Complement: 36

The Design 1116 ship (full name Emergency Fleet Corporation Design 1116) was a wood-hulled cargo ship design approved for production by the United States Shipping Board's Emergency Fleet Corporation (EFC) in World War I. As part of a larger effort to rapidly increase the country's shipping capacity, the EFC approved several standardized ship designs to be constructed using wood hulls. The Design 1116 was a revision by the Grays Harbor Motorship Company of their earlier Design 1005 ship in order to meet the requirements of commercial ship classification societies.

All were built by the Grays Harbor Motorship Company in Aberdeen, Washington. They were referred to as the "Ward"-type after M.R. Ward, manager at the Grays Harbor shipyard. All the hulls were laid down in 1919. The first ship of the class, the SS Adria, was listed at 3,132 gross register tons (GRT) with dimensions of 272.8 ft × 49.3 ft × 25.6 ft (83.1 m × 15.0 m × 7.8 m), 1400 indicated horsepower, and carried a crew of 36.

Of the 8 ships ordered, 4 were cancelled, 3 were later completed for the National Oil Company (SS Agylla, SS Agron, SS Adria) and one (Agathon) was destroyed in a fire before completion.
