= Craig Shipbuilding Company =

Shipyard in Long Beach, California, United States

Coordinates: 33.770586°N 118.213819°W

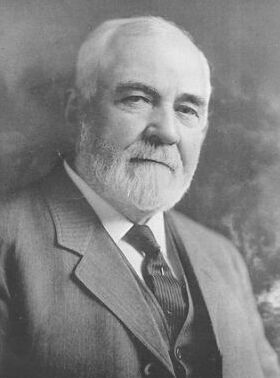
John Craig (1838–1934) founder of Craig Shipbuilding

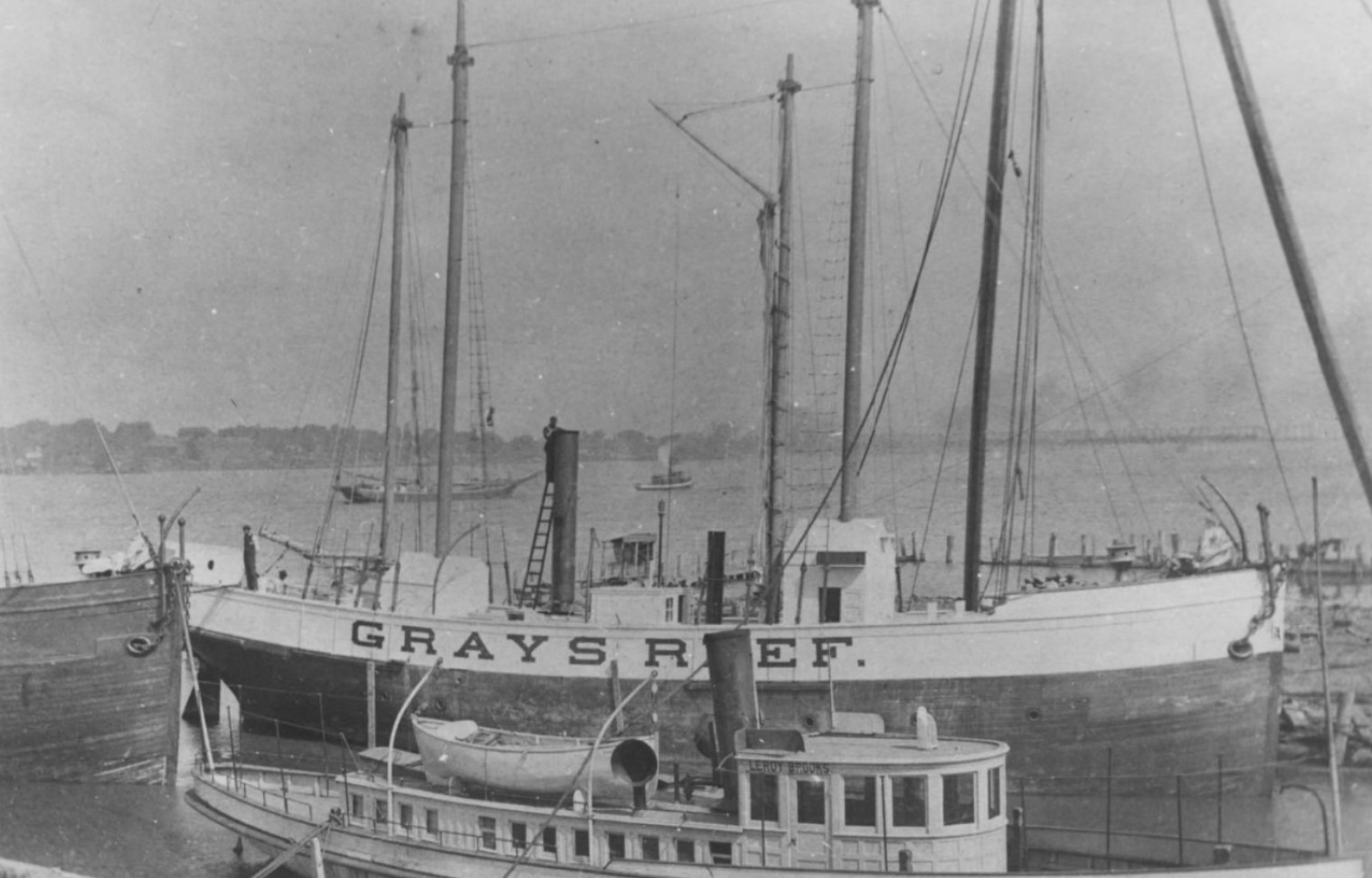
Light Vessel No.57 at Toledo, Ohio

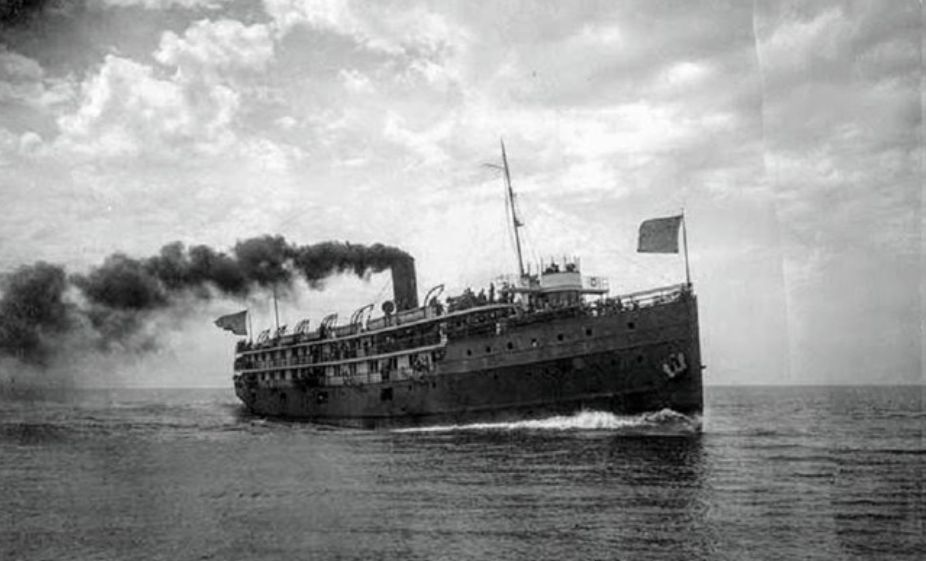
SS Puritan later became SS George M. Cox in 1933

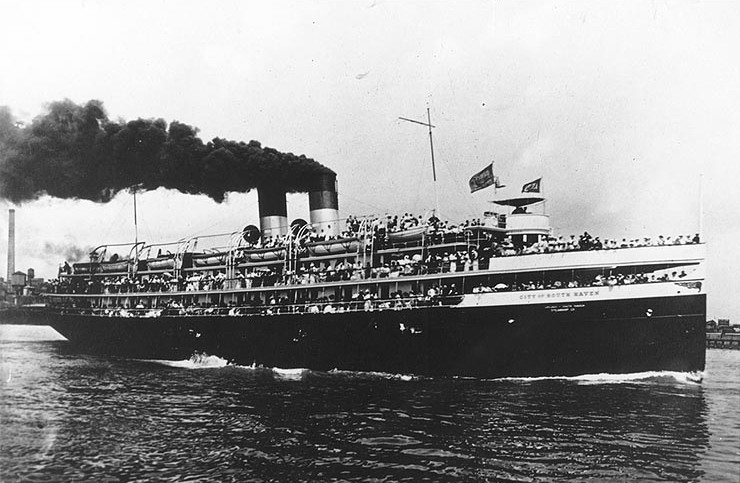
SS City of South Haven (American Passenger Steamship, 1903) Underway prior to World War I, with her decks crowded with passengers. This Great Lakes steamer was USS City of South Haven (ID # 2527) in 1918–1919

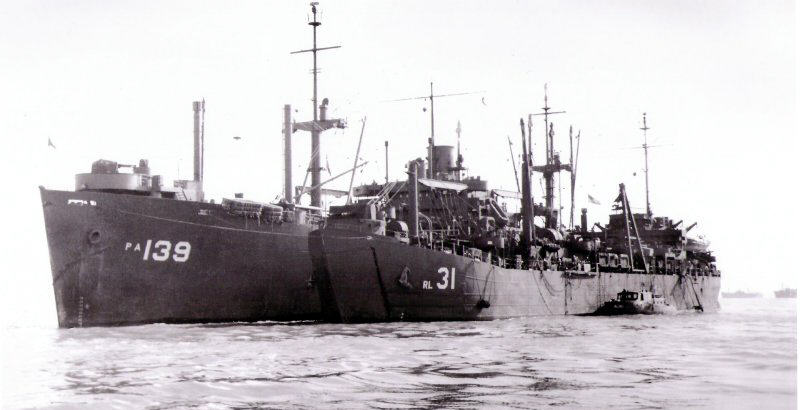
Broadwater (APA-139) alongside Bellerophon (ARL-31) in San Francisco Bay, October 1945

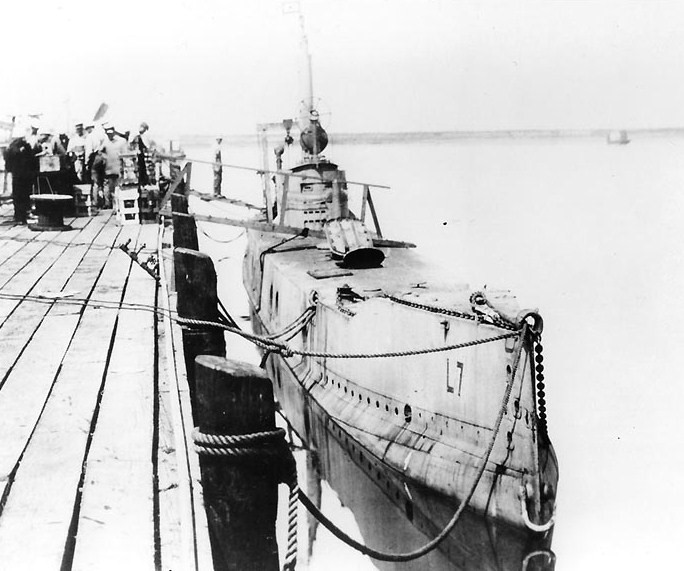
USS L-7 in port, in 1917

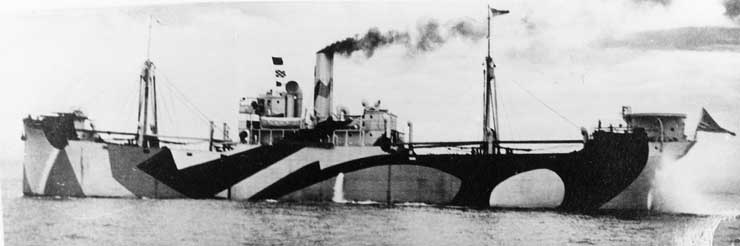
USS Ozaukee (ID-3429) around the time of her completion in September 1918.

Craig Shipbuilding was a shipbuilding company in Long Beach, California. To support the World War I demand for ships Craig Shipbuilding shipyard switched over to military construction and built: US Navy Submarines and Cargo Ships. Craig Shipbuilding was started in 1906 by John F. Craig. John F. Craig had worked in Toledo, Ohio with his father, John Craig (1838–1934), and Blythe Craig, both shipbuilders, their first ship was built in 1864 at Craig Shipbuilding Toledo. John F. Craig opened his shipbuilding company in Port of Long Beach on the south side of Channel 3, the current location of Pier 41 in the inner harbor, becoming the port's first shipyard. In 1908 Craig Shipbuilding was given the contract to finishing dredging of the Port of Long Beach inner harbor and to dredge the channel connecting it to the Pacific Ocean. In 1917 Craig sold the shipyard to the short-lived California Shipbuilding Company. but then opened a new shipyard next to the one he just sold and called it the Long Beach Shipbuilding Company. The Long Beach Shipbuilding Company built cargo ships in 1918, 1919, and 1920 for the United States Shipping Board.

In 1918 California Shipbuilding started to have difficulties completing contracts that it had purchased with the Craig Shipyard, including two submarines and a lighthouse tender. In 1921, Craig purchased his original shipyard back and renamed it back to Craig Shipbuilding. At the same time he renamed the Long Beach Shipbuilding to Craig Shipbuilding and ran both as one company. The tow shipyard did repair work on built yachts.

The United States Maritime Commission started a shipbuilding program in 1939, to support the World War 2 demand for ships. Craig leased the Long Beach Shipbuilding yard to the Consolidated Steel Corporation. Consolidated Steel built Type C1-B and C1-M cargo merchant ships and two Type P1 passenger ships at the leased yard from prefabricated sections erected at their Maywood plant inland. Consolidated Steel operated two other large shipyards, one nearby in the Port of Los Angeles West Basin in Wilmington, which was also supplied by Maywood, the other in Orange, Texas, and two other small boatyards. After World war 2, the Consolidated-leased yard closed. Craig shipyard continued to do repair work as the Long Beach Marine Repair and closed in 1970.

== Craig Shipbuilding Toledo ==
Notable ships built at Craig Shipbuilding Toledo (1864–1905), later purchased by a syndicate of investors in 1905 and renamed Toledo Shipbuilding Company, and then purchased in 1945 by the American Ship Building Company. Run today by the Toledo-Lucas County Port Authority:

- Two schooners, the James H. Seguine and Edwin Kirk in 1864 at Keyport, New Jersey
- Amelia G. Ireland, built at Wicomico Creek, Maryland in 1866
- Schooner Jane Ralston for Robert W. Linn. Craig started partnership with Linn: Linn & Craig
- Manistique in 1882 as John Craig & Son (with George Losee Craig); son John Franklin Craig joins in 1889; yard moves to Toledo.
- E.G. Crosby (1903)
- City of South Haven
- Lakeside
- City of Benton Harbor, the subject of a Supreme Court case
- Indianapolis
- Chippewa
- SS George M. Cox (SS Puritan) 1901 steel passenger screw-steamer, 495 tons, wrecked May 27, 1933.
- Detroiter, 1902
- Light Vessel No.57
- SS City of South Haven
- SS Harriet B.
- SS Puritan
- John C. Barr tug
- Grays Reef Light
- SS Grand Haven
- LV55, LV56, and LV57 at the Lansing Shoals Light Station, Light vessels
- United States lightship Nantucket (LV-58)
- Many tugs, propellers, barges, car ferries, light ships and passenger boats

== Craig Shipbuilding Long Beach Yard ==
On May 19, 1908, the Western Dredging and Marine Construction Co., of which John F. Craig was president and C. H. Windham general manager and treasurer was contracted to complete for $600,000 all dredging of the harbor, including that of Channels 1, 2, 3 and Slips 4 and 6, the turning basin and the ocean entrance at the mouth of San Gabriel River. Included was the purchase of the new electric dredge for $65,000.

Notable ships built at Craig Shipbuilding Long Beach Yard (1906 to 1 January 1916, when it was bought by the California Shipbuilding Company) and (1922–1934):

- Windham, first ship launching on 14 November 1908, attended by 1500 spectators, a 110 ft long all steel dredge named after C. H. Windham, mayor of Long Beach
- Paraiso, built 1912
- Grace Dollar, sister ship of the Paraiso, built 1913
- completed by California S.B. Co.
  - USLHT Cedar, US Coast Guard lighthouse/buoy tender, 1,890 tons, 1917
  - USS L-6 (SS-45), US Navy submarine, 1917
  - USS L-7 (SS-46), US Navy submarine, 1917
- Infanta, built 1930 for the actor John Barrymore (120-foot steel-hulled cruiser)
- Velero III, built 1931 for George Allan Hancock
- USS Amethyst, built 1931
- Georganna, built 1925
- Caroline, built 1931 for Eldridge R. Johnson, later converted to motor torpedo boat tender
- Geoanna, 1934 schooner

In 1932 Craig reconditioned 2 cargo vessels (Point Ancha, Point Lobos) for Swayne & Hoyt, including the installation of a low pressure turbine at the exhaust end of the triple-expansion engine to increase the speed of the ships.

== Long Beach Shipbuilding Company ==
The yard was the smallest of the three steel shipyards in the Ports of Los Angeles and Long Beach active during the World War I shipbuilding boom, responsible for 17% of the tonnage produced there. The Llewellyn Iron Works of Los Angeles produced engines for a number of yards on the West Coast. It is unknown whether a particular hull was towed to them for outfitting or their engine delivered to the yard.

Yard#	USSB#	Type	Engine	Name	Launched (Note: See List of ship launches in 1918 and 1919 for references)
124 (Note: First ship built at the yard, but hull number sequence continued from the Craig yard)	Req.	3,000dwt cargo		Silverado	11 Feb 18
125	Req.	3,000dwt cargo		Eldorado	7 May 18
126	2515	3,200dwt cargo (Note: Single member of the "class" of Design 1097 ships. Design very similar to Silverado and Eldorado.)		Wallingford	15 Jan 19
127	423	6,000dwt cargo (Note: The only 3 members of the class of Design 1021 ships)		Ozaukee	5 Jun 18
128	424	6,000dwt cargo		Oshkosh	31 Aug 18
129	425	6,000dwt cargo		Magunkook	25 Sep 18
130	2075	8.800dwt cargo	LIW	West Kasson	15 Mar 19
131	2076	8.800dwt cargo	LIW	West Keene	26 Apr 19
132	2077	8.800dwt cargo	LIW	West Katan	26 May 19
133	2078	8.800dwt cargo	LIW	Vinita	
134	2079	8.800dwt cargo	HOR	Haleakala	13 Sep 19
135	2080	8.800dwt cargo	LIW	West Keats	
136	2081	8.800dwt cargo	LIW	West Kebar	
137	2082	8.800dwt cargo	LIW	West Kedron	
138 - 141	2511 - 2514	8.800dwt cargo	cancelled		

Other notable ships built at Long Beach Shipbuilding Company Long Beach Yard (1918–1921):

- Edythe, yacht built in 1920 for owner John F. Craig; 186 tons; later sold and renamed Melodie
- MS Mazatlan launched 10 December 1919 for the California & Mexico SS Co. Built at a cost of $250,000. The vessel was equipped with 2 Winton diesels of 350 hp each driving 2 screws. Captain Terry of Swayne & Hoyt. First trip south scheduled for early February. Able to carry 1500 tons of cargo, 42 first class and 22 second class passengers, cost of $300,000. In February 1920 the keel of the second ship (350 tons, 127 ft long) had been laid.
- A 131 ft length, 21 ft beam motor yacht for Craig with two 150 hp engines to be launched Jan 1920.
- "steamship" Casco launched 5 August 1920 for the California & Mexico SS Co.

== California & Mexico Steamship Company ==
This company was established in 1915 with John F. Craig as president, but due to World War I, it was a dormant operation until its service was inaugurated with the launch of the MS Mazatlan. The line was to establish a trade route between Los Angeles and ports on the west coast of Mexico north of Mazatlán. The round trips were planned to include La Paz, Topolobampo, Mazatlan, San Bias, Manzanilio and at times Guaymas and last 25 days.

J. McMillan was general manager and Chas. G. Krueger, Los Angeles agent was also local agent for Swayne & Hoyt on their traffic passing through San Pedro.

In August 1921 the company advertised as representing Swayne & Hoyt (whose volume of course was much bigger than the company's own sailings), and as having offices in 794 Pacific Electric Building and operating on the Fifth Street Wharf in Los Angeles Harbor.

MS Mazatlan
From	To	Departure	Arrival	Cargo / Notes
1920
San Pedro		17 Feb		ship maiden voyage, line inaugural voyage
	San Pedro		18 Mar	22 survivors of H-1
	San Pedro		20 Apr	1500 tons of Mexican tomatoes
	San Pedro		19 May	La Paz district governor General Metza with $150,000 to $200,000 in gold stolen from the Mexican government
Mazatlan	San Francisco	5 Jun	11 Jun	750 tons sugar Topolobampo to S.F., also panocha, expected in San Pedro 12 or 13 June
	San Pedro		11 Aug	700 tons of garabanzas, to be put onto the West Coyote for Britain. 250 tons general for San Francsico. Excepted back from there 28 August.

== Consolidated Steel at the Long Beach Shipyard ==
The Llewellyn Iron Works, builder of marine engines for ships launched from Long Beach during World War I was one of the companies merged into Consolidated Steel. Consolidated did not build any engines during World War II.

See: Consolidated Steel Corporation#Long Beach shipyard

== Shipbuilding in Los Angeles and Long Beach ==
- West Basin
  - Consolidated Steel Wilmington
  - Los Angeles Shipbuilding and Dry Dock Company
  - Western Pipe and Steel
- Terminal Island
  - Southwestern Shipbuilding Company
    - Bethlehem San Pedro
  - California Shipbuilding Corporation
  - Al Larson Boat Shop
- Long Beach
  - Long Beach Shipbuilding Company
    - Consolidated Steel Long Beach
  - United Concrete Pipe Corporation, Steel Shipbuilding Division

== See also ==
- California during World War II#Ship building
- Maritime history of California
