= Design 1011 ship =

Wood-hulled cargo ship design

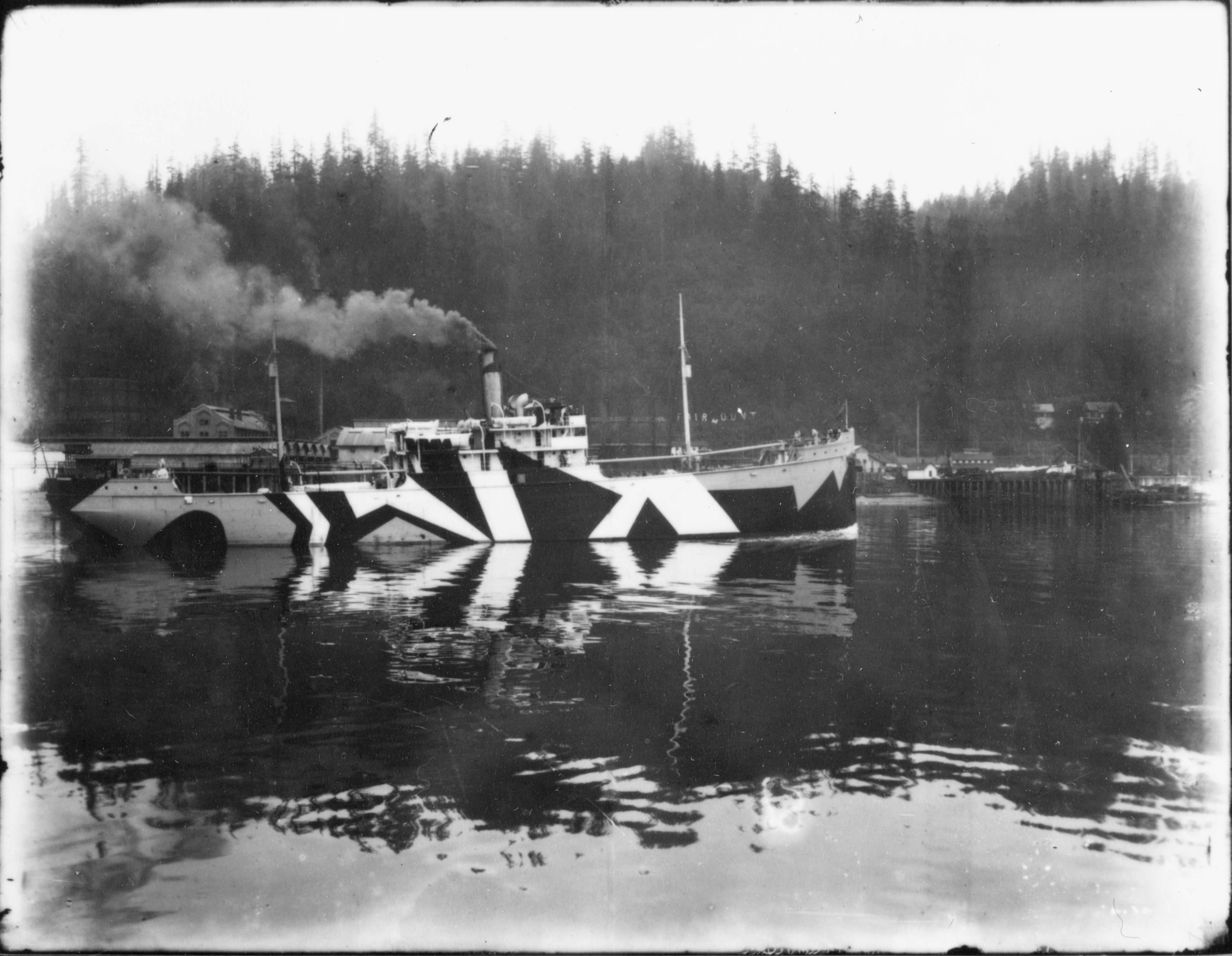
- Design 1011 ship SS Calala, painted in dazzle camouflage, on a trial trip in 1918

Class overview
- Name: EFC Design 1011
- Builders: Supple-Ballin Ship Building Corporation, Portland, Oregon
- Built: 1918–19 (USSB)
- Planned: 8
- Completed: 8

General characteristics
- Type: Cargo ship
- Tonnage: 2,799 GRT; 4,165 LT DWT
- Length: 307.0 ft (93.6 m) (overall); 285.0 ft (86.9 m) (p/p)
- Beam: 44.8 ft (13.7 m)
- Draft: 23.2 ft (7.1 m)
- Depth: 26.0 ft (7.9 m)
- Installed power: Two coal-fired watertube boilers, triple-expansion steam engine, 1,500 ihp (1,100 kW)
- Propulsion: Single screw
- Speed: 9 knots (17 km/h; 10 mph)
- Crew: 38

The Design 1011 ship (full name Emergency Fleet Corporation Design 1011) was a wood-hulled cargo ship design approved for production by the United States Shipping Board's Emergency Fleet Corporation (EFC) in World War I. The ships were referred to as the "Ballin type", as all were designed by naval architect Fred A. Ballin and built by the Supple-Ballin Ship Building Corporation in Portland, Oregon.

== Background ==
For added strength, Ballin's design covered the wooden hull frames with a skin of double-diagonal wooden planks and reinforced the hull's upper edge with steel plates. Each ship of the class measured 307.0 feet (93.6 m) in overall length, 285.0 feet (86.9 m) in length between perpendiculars, 44.8 feet (13.7 m) in beam, and 26.0 feet (7.9 m) in hull depth, with a load draft of 23.2 feet (7.1 m). Tonnage was 2,799 gross register tons (GRT) and 4,165 long tons deadweight (DWT). Propulsion was provided by a triple-expansion steam engine of 1,500 indicated horsepower (1,100 kW), fed by two coal-fired water-tube boilers; this engine drove a single screw, giving a speed of 9 knots (17 km/h; 10 mph). The crew complement was 38.

Of the 8 ships ordered, all were completed and delivered to the EFC in 1918 or 1919.

This class does not include the three Design 1102 cargo ships also built by Supple-Ballin; these were a modified version of Design 1011 with expanded beam. Six other ships were built by G. M. Standifer Construction Corporation to Design 1075, another modified version of Design 1011.
