= USS L-7 =

L-class submarine of the United States

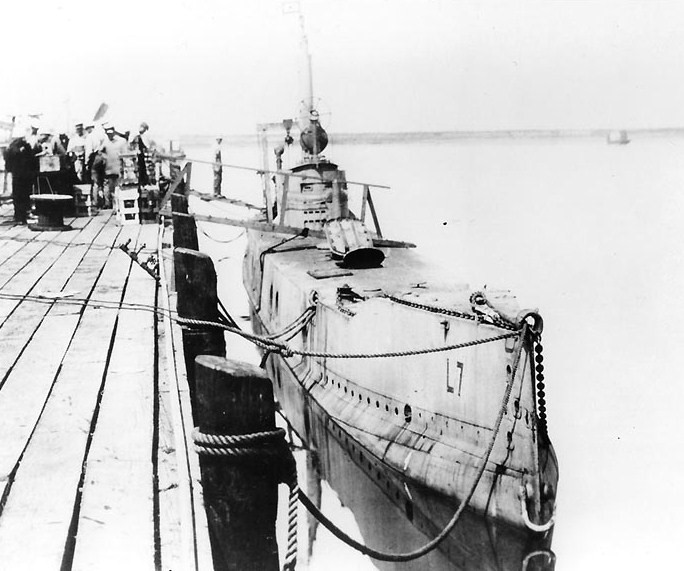
- USS L-7 bow view at Long Beach, California, 3 June 1918

History

United States
- Name: L-7
- Builder: Craig Shipbuilding Company, Long Beach, California
- Cost: $590,144.00 (hull and machinery)
- Laid down: 2 June 1914
- Launched: 28 September 1916
- Sponsored by: Mrs. Sarah Fogarty
- Commissioned: 7 December 1917
- Decommissioned: 15 November 1922
- Stricken: 20 March 1925
- Identification: Hull symbol: SS-46 (17 July 1920); Call sign: NYT
- Fate: Sold for scrapping, 21 December 1925

General characteristics
- Type: L-class submarine
- Displacement: 451 long tons (458 t) surfaced; 527 long tons (535 t) submerged
- Length: 165 ft (50 m)
- Beam: 14 ft 9 in (4.50 m)
- Draft: 13 ft 3 in (4.04 m)
- Installed power: 1,200 bhp (890 kW) (diesel); 800 hp (600 kW) (electric)
- Propulsion: 2 × Busch-Sulzer diesel engines; 2 × Diehl Manufacture Co. electric motors
- Speed: 14 kn (26 km/h; 16 mph) surfaced; 10.5 kn (19.4 km/h; 12.1 mph) submerged
- Range: 3,300 nmi (6,100 km; 3,800 mi) at 11 kn (20 km/h; 13 mph) surfaced; 150 nmi (280 km; 170 mi) at 5 kn (9.3 km/h; 5.8 mph) submerged
- Test depth: 200 ft (61.0 m)
- Complement: 2 officers; 26 enlisted
- Armament: 4 × 18 inch (450 mm) bow torpedo tubes (8 torpedoes); 1 × 3 in (76 mm)/23 caliber deck gun

USS L-7 (SS-46), also known as "Submarine No. 46", was an L-class submarine of the United States Navy. She worked on exercises off the West Coast, prior to sailing to the Azores, during WWI. After the war she transferred back to the Pacific, where she worked with experimental torpedoes and underwater detection equipment.

== Design ==
The L-class boats designed by Lake Torpedo Boat (L-5 through L-8) were built to slightly different specifications from the other L boats, which were designed by Electric Boat, and are sometimes considered a separate L-5 class. The Lake boats had a length of 165 ft (50.3 m) overall, a beam of 14 ft 9 in (4.5 m), and a mean draft of 13 feet 3 inches (4.0 m). They displaced 451 long tons (458 t) on the surface and 527 long tons (535 t) submerged. The L-class submarines had a crew of two officers and 28 enlisted men. They had a diving depth of 200 ft (61.0 m).

For surface running, the boats were powered by two 600-brake-horsepower (447 kW) Busch-Sulzer diesel engines, each driving one propeller shaft. When submerged each propeller was driven by a 400-horsepower (298 kW) electric motor. They could reach 14 kn (26 km/h; 16 mph) on the surface and 10.5 kn (19.4 km/h; 12.1 mph) underwater. On the surface, the Lake boats had a range of 5,150 nmi (9,540 km; 5,930 mi), at 11 kn (20 km/h; 13 mph), and 150 nmi (280 km; 170 mi), at 5 kn (9.3 km/h; 5.8 mph), submerged.

The boats were armed with four 18-inch (450 mm) torpedo tubes in the bow. They carried four reloads, for a total of eight torpedoes. The L-class submarines were also armed with a single 3 in (76 mm)/23 caliber on a disappearing mount.

== Construction ==
L-7's keel was laid down on 2 June 1914, by Craig Shipbuilding Company, in Long Beach, California. L-7 was launched on 28 September 1916, sponsored by Mrs. William B. Forgarty, and commissioned on 7 December 1917.

== Service history ==
After shakedown, L-7 departed the West Coast, on 20 April 1918, arriving in Charleston, South Carolina, on 10 June.

Patrolling off Charleston until 15 October 1918, the submarine finally steamed for the waters of Europe, to battle the U-boats. Arriving at Ponta Delgada, Azores, early in November, she joined Submarine Division 6. for anti-submarine warfare operations. The Armistice with Germany, of 11 November 1918, ended World War I, and L-7 sailed for home on 19 November.

Following stops at Caribbean and Central American ports, the submarine arrived at San Pedro, California, on 14 February 1919, completing one of the first long distance seagoing performances of America's youthful submarine force.

== Fate ==
From 1919 to 1922, she remained on the West Coast, experimenting with new torpedoes and undersea detection equipment. After a period of commission in ordinary early in 1922, L-7 was returned to full commission on 1 July, and sailed for Hampton Roads, Virginia, the same month. She decommissioned there on 15 November 1922, and was sold on 21 December 1925, to M. Samuel and Sons for scrapping.

== Bibliography ==
- "Table 21 - Ships on Navy List June 30, 1919". Congressional Serial Set. U.S. Government Printing Office: 767. 1921.
- Priolo, Gary. "L-7 (SS-46)". Navsource.net.
- Friedman, Norman (1995). U.S. Submarines Through 1945: An Illustrated Design History. Annapolis, Maryland: Naval Institute Press. ISBN 1-55750-263-3.
- Gardiner, Robert & Gray, Randal (1985). Conway's All the World's Fighting Ships 1906–1921. Annapolis, Maryland: Naval Institute Press. ISBN 0-85177-245-5.
- Cressman, Robert J. (29 May 2020). "L-7 (Submarine No. 46)". Dictionary of American Naval Fighting Ships. Navy Department, Naval History and Heritage Command. This article incorporates text from this source, which is in the public domain.
