= Design 1019 ship =

World War I steel-hulled cargo ship design

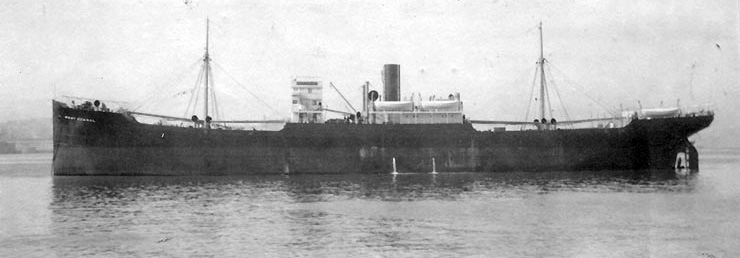
- West Avenal, a Design 1019 ship

Class overview
- Name: EFT Design 1019
- Builders: Atlantic Corporation; Long Beach Shipbuilding Company; Southwestern Shipbuilding; Western Pipe and Steel Company
- Built: 1919–20 (USSB); 1920 (private)
- Planned: 54
- Completed: 55

General characteristics
- Type: Cargo ship
- Tonnage: 8,800 dwt
- Length: 410 ft 5 in (125.10 m)
- Beam: 54 ft 0 in (16.46 m)
- Draft: 27 ft 0 in (8.23 m)
- Propulsion: various

The Design 1019 ship (full name Emergency Fleet Corporation Design 1019) was a steel-hulled cargo ship design approved for mass production by the United States Shipping Board's Emergency Fleet Corporation (EFT) in World War I.

They were referred to as the "Ferris-type". Production was spread out over four shipyards: Atlantic Corporation of Portsmouth, New Hampshire (10 ships); Long Beach Shipbuilding Company of Long Beach, California (8 ships); Southwestern Shipbuilding of San Pedro, California (19 ships); and Western Pipe and Steel Company of San Francisco, California (18 ships). 54 ships were completed for the USSB in late 1919 through 1920. An additional ship was completed in 1920 for a private shipping company. Engines were a mixture of steam turbines, coal-fueled triple expansion engines, and oil fueled triple expansion engines.

== Bibliography ==
- McKellar, Norman L. "Steel Shipbuilding under the U. S. Shipping Board, 1917-1921, Part II, Contract Steel Ships" (PDF). Steel Shipbuilding under the U. S. Shipping Board, 1917-1921. ShipScribe.
