= USS Walworth County =

United States Navy tank landing ship

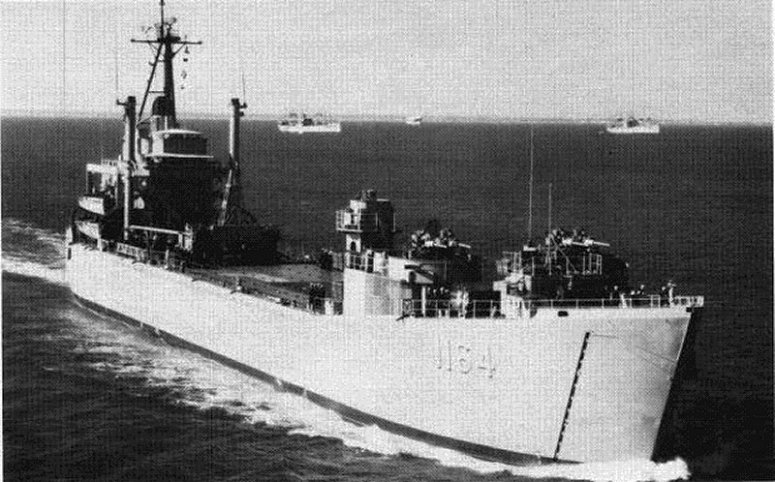
- USS Walworth County (LST-1164) sometime between October 1953 and January 1975.

History

United States
- Name: USS Walworth County
- Namesake: Walworth County, South Dakota, and Walworth County, Wisconsin
- Builder: Ingalls Shipbuilding Corporation, Pascagoula, Mississippi
- Laid down: 22 September 1952
- Launched: 15 May 1953
- Commissioned: 26 October 1953
- Decommissioned: 2 April 1971
- In service: with Military Sealift Command in non-commissioned service from May 1972 to 1 November 1973
- Renamed: USS Walworth County 1 July 1955 (previously was USS LST-1164); Became USNS Walworth County May 1972
- Reclassified: T-LST-1164 May 1972
- Stricken: From Navy List 1 November 1973; From Naval Register 26 April 1999
- Honors and awards: Letter of commendation from Commander, United States Naval Forces, United States Southern Command, and Commandant, 15th Naval District, for 1970 South America and Panama deployment
- Fate: Leased to Peru 7 August 1984; Became Peruvian Paita (DT-141); Sold to Peru 26 April 1999
- Notes: In commissioned service as USS LST-1164 1953–1955 and as USS Walworth County (LST-1164) 1955–1970; in non-commissioned service with Military Sealift Command as USNS Walworth County (T-LST-1162) 1972–1973

General characteristics
- Class & type: LST-1156-(Terrebonne Parish-) class landing ship tank
- Displacement: 2,590 tons (light); 5,800 tons (full load)
- Length: 384 ft (117 m)
- Beam: 56 ft (17 m)
- Draft: 17 ft (5.2 m)
- Installed power: 6,000 shp (4.48 MW)
- Propulsion: Four General Motors 16-278A diesel engines, two controllable-pitch propellers
- Speed: 14 knots
- Boats & landing craft carried: 3 x landing craft, vehicle, personnel LCVPs, 1 x landing craft personnel (large) LCPL
- Troops: 376
- Complement: Variously reported as 160 and 205 (16 officers and 189 enlisted personnel)
- Armor: 3 × twin 3 in (76 mm) dual-purpose gun mounts; 5 × 20 mm antiaircraft guns in single mounts

USS Walworth County (LST-1164), previously USS LST-1164, was a United States Navy landing ship tank (LST) in commission from 1953 to 1971, and which then saw non-commissioned Military Sealift Command service as USNS Walworth County (T-LST-1164) from 1972 to 1973.

== Construction and commissioning ==
Walworth County was designed under project SCB 9A and laid down as USS LST-1164 on 22 September 1952 at Pascagoula, Mississippi by the Ingalls Shipbuilding Corporation. She was launched on 15 May 1953, sponsored by Mrs. John A. Furr, and commissioned on 26 October 1953.

== Operations in U.S. waters 1953–1956 ==
LST-1164 departed Pascagoula on 20 November 1953, bound for Norfolk, Virginia. She conducted shakedown in the Chesapeake Bay and became a unit of Landing Ship Tank Division 23. The ship arrived at her home port of Naval Amphibious Base Little Creek, Virginia Beach, Virginia, on 3 December 1953. On 6 April 1954, LST-1164 departed the amphibious base for a brief stop at the United States Naval Reserve training center at Jacksonville, Florida. On 19 April 1954, the ship took part in simulated nuclear warfare strikes and returned to Little Creek on 25 May 1954.

LST-1164 spent June 1954 participating in amphibious exercises at Vieques Island, Puerto Rico. LST-1164 returned to Little Creek on 11 July 1954 for voyage repairs in the Norfolk Naval Shipyard in Portsmouth, Virginia, and towing exercises off Little Creek beach.

From 3 November 1954 through 24 March 1955, the ship participated in various exercises with the United States Marine Corps and the United States Army in the areas of Camp Pendleton, Virginia; Onslow Beach, North Carolina; and Vieques Island, Puerto Rico.

On 30 March 1955, LST-1164 entered the Philadelphia Naval Shipyard in Philadelphia, Pennsylvania, for a four-month overhaul. During that period, she was named USS Walworth County (LST-1164) on 1 July 1955. She returned to Little Creek on 5 August 1955 and conducted exercises in the Chesapeake Bay. The ship put to sea on 21 September 1955 for nuclear attack drills along the East Coast of the United States; gunnery practice in operating areas out of Jacksonville, Florida, and assault beaching runs with men of the 3rd Marine Regiment and their vehicles and combat equipment on the coast of North Carolina. Walworth County returned to Little Creek on 8 November 1955 and spent the following months in local waters with trips to Guantanamo Bay and the Caribbean.

In January 1956, as part of LANTRAEX-56, she left Morehead City, NC for Vieques, Puerto Rico carrying tanks in her well deck, trucks and construction equipment topside along with Marines from the 2nd Shore Party Bn. 2nd Marine Division.

== First Mediterranean deployment 1956 ==
Walworth County left Norfolk with a load of ammunition on 7 May 1956 and, two weeks later, arrived at the United States naval base at Port Lyautey, French Morocco. On 9 May 1956, she sailed for Greece and arrived at Piraeus on 30 May 1956 for operations with an amphibious task force of the United States Sixth Fleet which took her to principal ports of the Mediterranean Sea. Walworth County returned home to Little Creek on 26 September 1956. She spent the remainder of 1956 in local operating areas.

== Panama deployment 1957 ==
On 5 March 1957, Walworth County arrived at the Naval Base at Coco Solo, Panama Canal Zone. From there, she took survey parties to beaching sites in the Chagres River and other places in preparation for Operation Caribex which tested the mobility of American forces in defending the Panama Canal.

== Operations in U.S. waters and Caribbean exercise 1957–1958 ==
Walworth County returned to Little Creek from her Panama cruise on 16 March 1957 and put to sea on 10 April 1957 to participate in a three-phase operation involving the U.S. Marine Corps, the U.S. Army, and the United States Air Force. The exercise—conducted on Vieques Island, Fort Lorenzo, Canal Zone, and Rio Hata – terminated on 28 April 1957; and Walworth County underwent extended upkeep in the New York Naval Shipyard in Brooklyn, New York, from 14 May 1957 through 11 July 1957. She returned to Little Creek the following day and began local operations which lasted until 14 November 1957. At that time, Walworth County undertook exercises with amphibious warfare forces that included practice assaults with Marines on Vieques Island, Puerto Rico, and St. Thomas, United States Virgin Islands.

== Second Mediterranean deployment 1958 ==
Walworth County returned to Little Creek on 25 March 1958 but a month later headed for Morehead City, North Carolina. There, she loaded Marines and combat cargo in preparation for an amphibious training operation to be held in the Mediterranean with forces of the United Kingdom and Italy. She transited the Strait of Gibraltar on 14 May 1958 and visited the ports of İzmir, Turkey; Athens, Greece; and Suda Bay, Crete. However, the operation was cancelled because of Middle East tensions, and Walworth County had the distinction of acting as a primary control ship in the initial landing of Marines at Beirut, Lebanon, on 15 July 1958. Her operations in this area continued until 1 October 1958 when she departed Beirut and sailed for the United States. She reached Morehead City on 19 October 1958 and became a unit of Amphibious Squadron 6.

== Third Mediterranean deployment 1959–1960 ==
From 12 December 1958 to 24 February 1959, Walworth County underwent an overhaul in the Charleston Naval Shipyard at Charleston, South Carolina. The ship conducted local operations and visited Guantanamo Bay before sailing for Spain. She arrived at Rota, Spain, on 30 July 1959 and commenced her third Mediterranean tour which lasted until 9 February 1960.

== Operations in U.S. waters 1960 ==
Walworth County returned to Morehead City and spent the following months conducting practice landings at Onslow Beach, making cruises to Halifax, Nova Scotia, and to Bermuda, and completing another tour of duty in the Caribbean Sea that included amphibious warfare practice in the waters of Puerto Rico and the U.S. Virgin Islands.

== Fourth Mediterranean deployment 1960–1961 ==
On 28 October 1960, Walworth County sailed from Little Creek with Amphibious Squadron 6 for a fourth Mediterranean deployment. The ship gave effective support to assault practice with Marine battalion landing teams at Augusta Bay, Sicily; with Greek raider teams at Nauplion, Greece; and with both Amphibious Squadrons 6 and 4 and two Marine battalion landing teams at Portoscuso, Sardinia.

== Operations in U.S. waters 1961–1962 ==
Walworth County returned to Little Creek on 19 May 1961 and underwent overhaul in the Norfolk Naval Shipyard through September 1961. She spent the remainder of 1961 in amphibious assault training on Onslow Beach and at Camp Pendleton, Virginia, where she took part in Army landing assault training.

Walworth County departed Little Creek on 17 January 1962, embarked Marines at Morehead City, and headed for Guantanamo Bay to participate in Operation Springboard 62. The ship made calls at several Caribbean ports and then disembarked the Marines at Morehead City on 1 March 1962. On 5 March 1962, she returned to Norfolk where she was placed on restricted availability status until 15 May 1962.

== Fifth Mediterranean deployment 1962 ==
In May 1962, Walworth County embarked Marines of "Foxtrot" Company, Battalion Landing Team 2/6 and, on 1 June 1962, proceeded to tour the entire length of the Mediterranean from Alicante, Spain, to Marmaris, Turkey, where she operated with combined Turkish and Greek forces. After extensive exercises, including seven amphibious training assaults on various beaches, she sailed for her home port and arrived at Norfolk on 20 October 1962.

== The Cuban Missile Crisis and operations in U.S. waters 1962–1964 ==
On 21 October 1962, the day after she arrived at Norfolk, Walworth County was called upon to participate in the blockade of Cuba during the Cuban Missile Crisis and operated in the Caribbean with the ready amphibious group until 4 December 1962, when she returned to the United States and debarked Marines at Morehead City. Walworth County arrived at Norfolk the following day and spent the remainder of 1962 in leave and upkeep.

During the early part of 1963, Walworth County conducted local operations in the Little Creek area. After entering Gibbs Shipyard at Jacksonville, Florida, on 3 April 1963, she completed her scheduled yard period and sea trials, then headed for Little Creek on 10 June 1963. The ship took part in amphibious refresher training through July and August 1963, followed by a three-week period of restricted availability. During the remainder of 1963, she participated in local operations, visited Rockland, Maine, to obtain tactical data for the LST-1156-class landing ships tank (of which she was a part), and underwent overhaul.

== Panama deployment, operations in U.S. waters, and Spain deployment 1964 ==
In January 1964, Walworth County got underway for Panama where she spent more than four months, making 16 transits of the Panama Canal, including one round trip which she completed in less than 23 hours. Late in May 1964, she returned to Little Creek and, after tender availability, took part in the "MEBLEX" and midshipman exercises. Following this, she made a call to New York for the 1964 World's fair and returned to Little Creek on 11 August 1964. While in port, Walworth County was used in the production of a Bureau of Medicine and Surgery mental health movie. In late August 1964, Walworth County again got underway for a lift to Guantanamo Bay, Cuba, and returned via Miami, Florida, on 13 September 1964.

Walworth County spent a short period in the yard before getting underway on 5 October 1964 for "Steel Pike I," the largest amphibious exercise since World War II. Besides carrying out her role in the operation, she called at Rota, Spain, and the Canary Islands before returning home on 28 November 1964.

== Operations in U.S. waters 1964–1965 ==
Walworth County spent the end of 1964 and beginning of 1965 undergoing tender availability.

In early February 1965, she sailed for Vieques Island, Puerto Rico, and took liberty in the U.S. Virgin Islands and at San Juan and Ponce, Puerto Rico. She arrived back at Little Creek on 8 March 1965 and then participated in exercises to train U.S. Army personnel in amphibious warfare. Following these training exercises, the ship conducted local operations and made preparations for an upcoming deployment.

== Sixth Mediterranean deployment 1966 ==
Having completed all preparations, Walworth County got underway with Amphibious Squadron 6 on 24 January 1966. She proceeded to Bermuda as an escort for minesweepers when the squadron was recalled. After spending one week in Bermuda, she returned to Little Creek. On 6 March 1966, the ship got underway for her sixth Mediterranean tour. There, she joined in a combined North Atlantic Treaty Organization (NATO) exercise and other amphibious assault operations. On 1 July 1966, she became a part of Amphibious Squadron 8. Walworth County returned to the United States on 2 August 1966.

== Operations in U.S. waters 1966–1967 ==
Walworth County underwent a period of training and upkeep, and then spent the final weeks of August 1966 on a midshipman cruise and taking on board dependents of the crew for a day at sea.

On 1 September 1966, Walworth County got underway for Guantanamo Bay with Marines embarked. After a short stay, she returned to her home port where she underwent training and upkeep. On 26 September 1966, she headed for the Boston, Massachusetts, operating area with civilian technicians and representatives from the Naval Ordnance Testing Laboratory. The ship travelled to Fort Lauderdale, Florida, to unload testing equipment before returning to Little Creek. On 18 October 1966, Walworth County underwent a period of tender availability. Late in November 1966, she participated in an exercise off Vieques Island and put into San Juan, Puerto Rico, for repairs. On 15 December 1966 she got underway for Little Creek and spent the end of 1966 there.

The new year, 1967, found Walworth County in the Norfolk Naval Shipyard for repairs to her propellers, but she returned to Little Creek on 20 March 1967. After a short trip to New York, she got underway on 8 April 1967 and headed for the Caribbean to participate in the joint services exercise "Clove Hitch III." She returned to Little Creek on 4 May 1967 and spent a month undergoing maintenance and post-repair training.

Walworth County devoted September and October 1967 to a goodwill tour off Deal Island, Maryland, and Operation "JCOC 37," an amphibious assault off Onslow Beach, North Carolina. From 27 October 1967 to 10 November 1967, Walworth County was deployed to the Caribbean. On the ship's return to Little Creek, she began an overhaul and then prepared for an upcoming Mediterranean tour.

== Seventh Mediterranean deployment 1967–1968 ==
On 3 January 1968, Walworth County got underway for Morehead City, where she embarked Marines and loaded equipment. On 6 January 1968, she rendezvoused with five minesweepers and began the voyage across the North Atlantic for her seventh Mediterranean cruise. She reached Rota, Spain, on 3 February 1968 and began a series of "Phiblex" exercises which took her to Sardinia and Corsica. Her crew was given shore leave at Toulon, France; La Spezia and Naples, Italy; and Rota, Spain. On 27 April 1968, Walworth County took part in Operation "Dawn Patrol" involving 40 ships of five nations. The exercises were completed on 12 May 1968 at Timbakion, Crete. The ship then sailed for Rota, Spain, and steamed across the North Atlantic. She arrived at Morehead City on 8 June 1968 and proceeded to Little Creek, where she arrived on 9 June 1968.

== Operations in U.S. waters 1968 ==
After a month of maintenance, Walworth County participated in a riverine warfare exercise in Virginia's James River, which taught the fundamentals of river warfare and lessons learned in the Vietnam War, from 9 July 1968 to 19 July 1968. The ship then spent the remainder of July and most of August undergoing a tender availability.

== Southern Command deployment 1968–1969 ==
Walworth County got underway on 23 September 1968 for a United States Southern Command deployment as a member of Landing Ship Tank Division 41. After a trip to the Panama Canal Zone, she got underway on 9 October 1968 for a visit to Jamaica. Upon reaching Montego Bay, Walworth County was called back to Panama when an uprising overthrew the Panamanian government. She arrived in the Panama Canal Zone on 14 October 1968 and, the next day, transited the canal to the Pacific Ocean. She remained at the Rodman Naval Station in Panama until 8 November 1968.

Loaded with Operation Handclasp material, Walworth County got underway for Ecuador on 8 November 1968 and arrived at Guayaquil on 9 November 1968. She returned to Rodman Naval Station on 17 November 1968 and, except for four amphibious landings and a round-trip transit of the Panama Canal, remained there until 9 January 1969.

== Operations in U.S. waters and the Caribbean 1969–1970 ==
From 1 March 1969 to 16 May 1969, Walworth County underwent upkeep at the Norfolk Shipbuilding and Drydock Corporation in Berkley, Virginia. The ship then began a period of upkeep at her home port of Little Creek. On 21 July 1969, she started amphibious refresher training and then prepared for movement overseas. From 15 September 1969 through 25 November 1969, the ship operated in the Caribbean Ready Group.

Upon her return to Little Creek, Walworth County began another period of leave and upkeep. Then she conducted a training exercise from 12 January 1970 to 16 January 1970. On 30 January 1970, she began a month of tender availability by repair ship USS Vulcan (AR-5), which was moored at the Naval Station Norfolk. This work lasted until 20 February 1970, when Walworth County returned to Little Creek.

== South America and Panama deployment 1970 ==
Following several months of local operations, Walworth County sailed independently on 8 July 1970 for South America. Her mission was primarily one of good will. She delivered earthquake relief supplies to Peruvian ports and carried Project Handclasp material to Ecuador. For the remainder of the deployment, Walworth County carried out many and varied missions, ranging from being a home for Smithsonian Institution scientists performing marine biology research to acting as a ferryboat for United States exhibits to a regional fair at Bocas del Toro, Panama. The scientists worked with the Smithsonian Tropical Research Institute, which conducts research all around Panama including the Panama Canal, Bocas del Toro Archipelago, and Laguna de Chiriquí. During her three-month deployment, Walworth County steamed over 9,000 nautical miles (16,668 kilometers), and she received a letter of commendation from Admiral C. D. Nace, Commander, United States Naval Forces, Southern Command and Commandant, 15th Naval District. After a final transit of the Panama Canal, Walworth County headed homeward, arriving back at Little Creek on 23 October 1970.

== Inactivation and decommissioning 1971 ==
Following the post-deployment leave periods, Walworth County commenced preparations for inactivation. On 4 January 1971, operational and administrative control of the ship was shifted from Amphibious Force, United States Atlantic Fleet to the Inactive Ship Maintenance Facility, Norfolk, Virginia.

After three months of work by her crew, Walworth County was decommissioned on 2 April 1971. She subsequently was towed to Orange, Texas, where she arrived on 14 April 1971. She was drydocked on 11 May 1971 for the underwater phase of inactivation, with the topside phase scheduled to commence upon completion of the drydock phase. She then was laid up in the Atlantic Reserve Fleet, Texas Group at Orange, Texas.

== Military Sealift Command service 1972–1973 ==
In May 1972, Walworth County was scheduled for transfer to the Maritime Administration and layup in the National Defense Reserve Fleet at Suisun Bay, Benicia, California, but instead she served in a non-commissioned status with a primarily civilian crew as a cargo ship in the Military Sealift Command (MSC) as a United States Naval Ship, USNS Walworth County (T-LST-1164), from May 1972 until stricken from the Navy List on 1 November 1973.

== Reserve status and transfer to Peru ==
On 19 June 1974, Walworth County was turned over to the Maritime Administration and berthed at Suisun Bay as part of the National Defense Reserve Fleet.

On 7 August 1984, Walworth County and three of her sister ships -- USS Traverse County (LST-1160), USS Waldo County (LST-1163), and USS Washoe County (LST-1165)—were leased to Peru, and Walworth County was commissioned into service in the Peruvian Navy as Paita (DT-141) on 4 March 1985. Peru renewed the lease on all four ships in August 1989 and August 1994, and the United States sold all four outright to Peru on 26 April 1999 under the Security Assistance Program; all four were struck from the U.S. Naval Register on the day of the sale. She was decommissioned by the Peruvian Navy in September 2012.

== See also ==
- List of United States Navy LSTs
