= USS Waldo County =

United States Navy landing ship tank

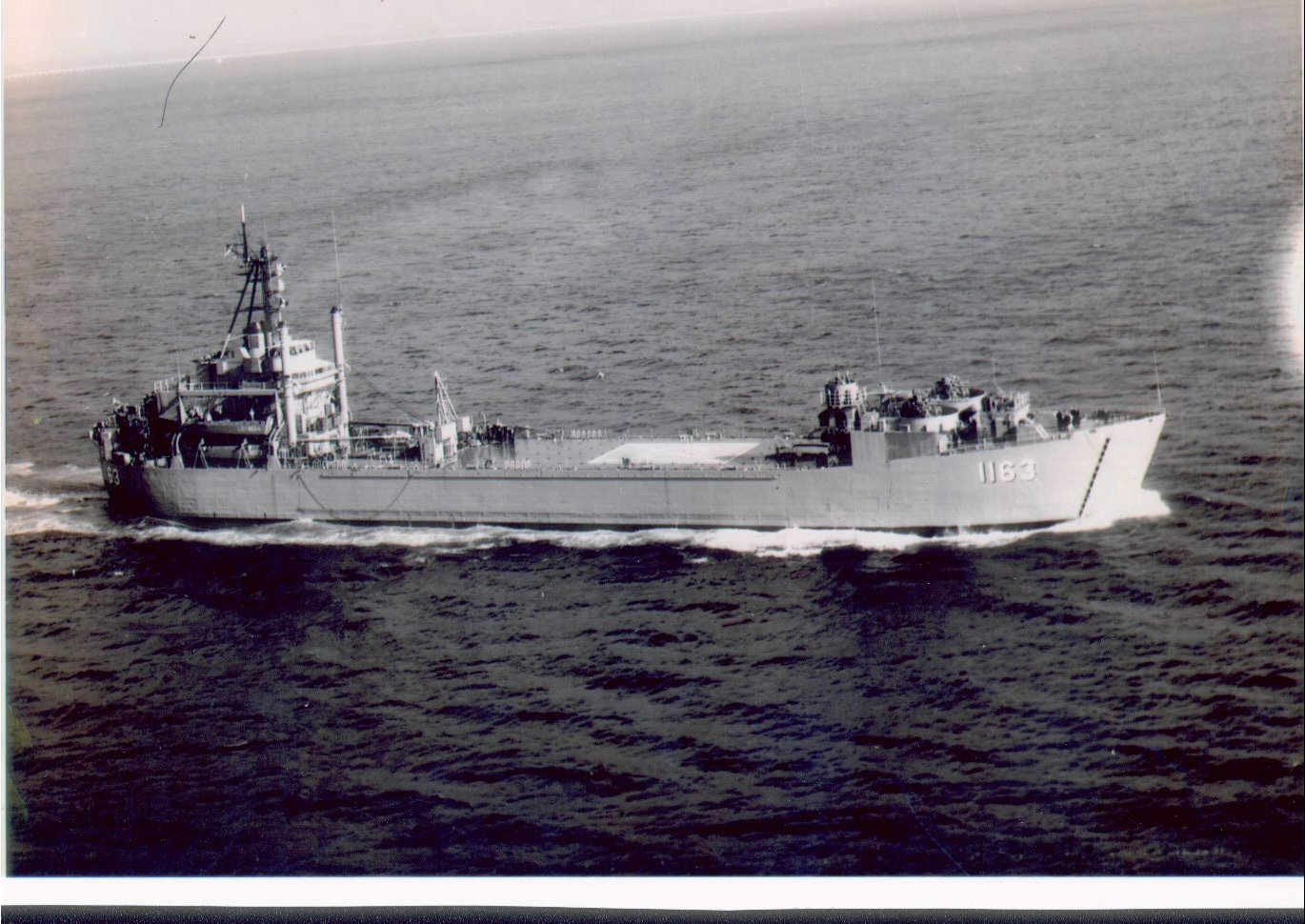
- USS Waldo County (LST-1163) in the Caribbean ca. 1970.

History

United States
- Name: USS Waldo County
- Namesake: Waldo County in Maine
- Builder: Ingalls Shipbuilding Corporation, Pascagoula, Mississippi
- Laid down: 4 August 1952
- Launched: 17 May 1953
- Commissioned: 17 September 1953
- Decommissioned: 21 December 1970
- In service: with Military Sealift Command in non-commissioned service from May 1972 to 1 November 1973
- Renamed: USS Waldo County 1 July 1955 (previously was USS LST-1163); Became USNS Waldo County May 1972
- Reclassified: T-LST-1163 May 1972
- Stricken: From Navy List 1 November 1973; From Naval Register 26 April 1999
- Honors and awards: Armed Forces Expeditionary Medal three times (1961, 1965, 1966)
- Fate: Leased to Peru 7 August 1984; Sold outright to Peru 26 April 1999
- Notes: In commissioned service as USS LST-1163 1953–1955 and as USS Waldo County (LST-1163) 1955–1970; in non-commissioned service with Military Sealift Command as USNS Waldo County (T-LST-1163) 1972–1973

General characteristics
- Class & type: LST-1156—(Terrebonne Parish)—class landing ship tank
- Displacement: 2,440 tons (light); 5,800 tons (full)
- Length: 384 ft (117 m)
- Beam: 55 ft (17 m)
- Draft: 17 ft (5.2 m)
- Installed power: 6,000 shp (4.48 MW)
- Propulsion: Four General Motors 16-278A diesel engines, two controllable-pitch propellers
- Speed: 14 knots
- Boats & landing craft carried: 3 x landing craft, vehicle, personnel LCVPs, 1 x landing craft personnel (large) LCPL
- Troops: 395 (15 officers, 380 enlisted men)
- Complement: 205 (16 officers, 189 enlisted men)
- Armor: 3 × twin 3 in (76 mm) dual-purpose gun mounts; 5 × single 20 mm antiaircraft gun mounts

USS Waldo County (LST-1163), previously USS LST-1163, was a United States Navy landing ship tank (LST) in commission from 1953 to 1970, and which then saw non-commissioned Military Sealift Command service as USNS Waldo County (T-LST-1163) from 1972 to 1973.

== Construction and commissioning ==
Waldo County was designed under project SCB 9A and laid down as USS LST-1163 on 4 August 1952 at Pascagoula, Mississippi, by Ingalls Shipbuilding Corporation. She was launched on 17 March 1953, sponsored by Mrs. C. Richard Shaeffner, and commissioned on 17 September 1953.

== Operations in U.S. waters and Caribbean 1953–1955 ==
LST-1163 departed Pascagoula on 14 October 1953 and steamed via Key West, Florida, Florida; Port Everglades, Florida; and Charleston, South Carolina, to her permanent home port, Naval Amphibious Base Little Creek, in Virginia Beach, Virginia. She arrived at Little Creek on 25 October 1953. Exercises and shakedown training occupied the remainder of 1953 and the first few months of 1954.

On 14 June 1954, LST-1163 departed Little Creek for Morehead City, North Carolina, to embark United States Marines for amphibious exercises. She arrived at Morehead City on 15 June 1954, loaded troops and equipment, and got underway on 16 June 1954 for Vieques Island, located near Puerto Rico in the West Indies. LST-1163 reached Vieques Island on 21 June 1954 and conducted amphibious training until 1 July 1954, when she headed back to Little Creek. She arrived at Little Creek on 5 July 1954 and remained there eight days before entering the Norfolk Naval Shipyard at Portsmouth, Virginia, on 13 July 1954. She left the shipyard on 6 August 1954 and returned to Little Creek to resume duty with the Amphibious Force, United States Atlantic Fleet. For the remainder of the year, LST-1163 conducted a series of amphibious exercises, mostly at Vieques Island, but she also participated in one cold-weather exercise at Hamilton Inlet on the coast of Labrador in Newfoundland, Canada, in November 1954.

On 18 January 1955, LST-1163 entered the Philadelphia Naval Shipyard at Philadelphia, Pennsylvania, for her first major overhaul. She emerged from the yard, revitalized, on 20 May 1955 and resumed duty with the Amphibious Force. On 1 July 1955, LST-1163 was renamed USS Waldo County (LST-1163). Through the summer of 1955, Waldo County remained close to or in Little Creek.

== First Mediterranean deployment 1955–1956 ==
On 24 August 1955, Waldo County departed the Norfolk, Virginia, area for her first overseas deployment. After stops at Bordeaux in France, Port Lyautey in Morocco, and at Gibraltar, she joined the United States Sixth Fleet in the Mediterranean late in September 1955. For the next four months, she ranged the length and breadth of the Mediterranean Sea conducting Sixth Fleet amphibious exercises and making port visits. On 25 January 1956, she departed Port Lyautey on her way home. She returned to Norfolk on 6 February 1956 and resumed operations with the United States Second Fleet.

== Operations 1956–1970 ==
In her first two years of active service, Waldo County established a pattern of operations which endured until the end of 1964. She alternated five Mediterranean deployments with periods of duty out of Little Creek conducting amphibious training at such places as Vieques Island, Onslow Beach in North Carolina, and at various locations in the Canadian Maritime Provinces. During her second Mediterranean deployment, which lasted from August 1957 to February 1958, she acted as a unit of a contingency force established in the eastern Mediterranean during civil unrest in Lebanon.

In 1959 the Waldo County made her first and only Top Secret Mission. A Top Secret crypto message ordered her and two sister ship LST's to proceed from Little Creek to Quantico Marine Base for further orders. At Quantico the LST's on-loaded two battalions of South Vietnamese marines and US Marine trainers and proceeded to the Caribbean to hold amphibious landing exercises for several weeks. At the conclusion the Marines were dropped off at Camp Lejeune. Not too many years later the U.S. was deeply involved in the Vietnam war.

The remaining three deployments were more routine in nature, consisting only of training missions and port visits. Between her third and fourth deployments to the Sixth Fleet, she earned the Armed Forces Expeditionary Medal in November and December 1961 when she cruised Cuban waters as a part of another contingency force established in response to a wave of what the United States considered to be terrorist actions by the Cuban government following the abortive April 1961 Bay of Pigs Invasion of Cuba. Otherwise, the periods between deployments consisted entirely of routine Second Fleet operations, primarily amphibious training missions at the previously named locations.

Waldo County returned to Little Creek from her fifth and last Mediterranean cruise on 17 November 1964. At that point, she began a new phase of her career. No longer did she deploy to the Sixth Fleet. For the remaining six years of her active career, she confined her operations to the East Coast of the United States and the West Indies. The ubiquitous amphibious exercises predominated, but, on two occasions, she did perform special missions. In May and June 1965, she again earned the Armed Forces Expeditionary Medal when she joined another contingency force in the West Indies during a period of extreme internal unrest in the Dominican Republic quelled by the intervention of forces of the Organization of American States. In 1966, she qualified for that award again by returning to the Dominican Republic once more.

From that time on, Waldo County broke her routine of U.S. East Coast – West Indies operations only one time. In January 1970, she steamed to the Panama Canal and transited it for a brief series of landing exercises on the Pacific Ocean side of the Panamanian Isthmus. She retransited the canal on 2 February 1970 and resumed operations in the West Indies. Normal operations occupied her time until September 1970, at which time she began preparations for inactivation.

== Decommissioning, reserve, and Military Sealift Command service 1970–1973 ==
Waldo County was decommissioned on 21 December 1970 and laid up in the Atlantic Reserve Fleet at Orange Texas. She remained there until May 1972, at which time she was reactivated for non-commissioned service as a cargo ship with a civil service crew with the Military Sealift Command (MSC) as the United States Naval Ship USNS Waldo County (T-LST-1163). She operated under MSC control for about 18 months before being sticken from the Navy List on 1 November 1973.

== Layup and transfer to Peru ==
Waldo County name was stricken from the Navy List on 1 November 1973, and she was transferred to the Maritime Administration for layup in the National Defense Reserve Fleet at Suisun Bay at Benicia, California.

On 7 August 1984, Waldo County and three of her sister ships – USS Traverse County (LST-1160), USS Walworth County (LST-1164), and USS Washoe County (LST-1165) – were leased to Peru, and Waldo County was commissioned into service in the Peruvian Navy as BAP Pisco (DT-142) on 4 March 1985. Peru renewed the lease on all four ships in August 1989 and August 1994, and the United States sold all four outright to Peru on 26 April 1999 under the Security Assistance Program; all four were struck from the U.S. Naval Register on the day of the sale. She was decommissioned from the Peruvian Navy in 2012 and scrapped the same year.

== See also ==
- List of United States Navy LSTs
