= Traverse County =

Traverse County may refer to:

Places

- Traverse County, Minnesota
- Grand Traverse County, Michigan

Ships

- USS Traverse County (LST-1160), a United States Navy tank landing ship in commission from 1952 to 1970, which also saw non-commissioned service in the Military Sealift Command from 1972 to 1973 as USNS Traverse County (T-LST-1160)
