= USS Terrebonne Parish =

United States Navy tank landing ship of 1952–1971

History

United States
- Name: USS Terrebonne Parish (LST-1156)
- Namesake: Terrebonne Parish, Louisiana
- Builder: Bath Iron Works, Bath, Maine
- Laid down: 2 January 1952
- Launched: 9 August 1952
- Sponsored by: Miss Anne L. McCrea
- Commissioned: 21 November 1952
- Decommissioned: 29 October 1971
- Renamed: From USS LST-1156 to USS Terrebonne Parish 1 July 1955
- Stricken: 1 November 1976
- Nickname(s): "T-Bone"
- Honors and awards: National Defense Service Medal; Three Armed Forces Expeditionary Medals (one for Cuba, two for the Dominican Republic); Several Battle E awards
- Fate: Loaned to Spain 29 October 1971; Sold to Spain 17 May 1978

Spain
- Name: Velasco (L-11)
- Namesake: Luis Vicente de Velasco (1711–1762), Spanish naval commander
- Acquired: On loan 29 October 1971; Purchased 17 May 1978
- Fate: Hulked 1980; Scrapped 1994

General characteristics
- Class & type: Terrebonne Parish-class tank landing ship
- Displacement: 2,590 tons (light), 5,800 tons (full load)
- Length: 384 ft 0 in (117.04 m)
- Beam: 55 ft 0 in (16.76 m)
- Draft: 17 ft 0 in (5.18 m)
- Installed power: 6,000 shaft horsepower (4.48 megawatts)
- Propulsion: Four General Motors 16-278A diesel engines, two controllable-pitch propellers
- Speed: 14 knots
- Boats & landing craft carried: Three LCVPs, one LCPL
- Troops: 395 (15 officers and 380 enlisted men)
- Complement: 205 (16 officers and 189 enlisted men)
- Armament: Three twin 3 in (76 mm) 50-caliber gun mounts; five single 20 mm gun mounts

USS Terrebonne Parish (LST-1156), originally USS LST-1156, affectionately nicknamed the "T-Bone" by her early crew, was a Terrebonne Parish-class tank landing ship built for the United States Navy in 1952. The lead ship in her class, she was named for Terrebonne Parish, Louisiana, the only U.S. Navy vessel to bear the name. The ship was transferred to Spain in 1971 and renamed Velasco (L-11). She was scrapped in 1994.

== Construction and commissioning, 1952 ==
Terrebonne Parish was designed under Project SCB 9A and laid down as USS LST-1156 on 2 January 1952 at Bath, Maine, by Bath Iron Works. She was launched on 9 August 1952, sponsored by Miss Anne L. McCrea, and commissioned on 21 November 1952.

== U.S. Navy service ==
=== United States East Coast, Caribbean, and Atlantic operations, 1952–1957 ===
Following sea trial and shakedown, LST-1156 underwent post-shakedown alterations at the Norfolk Naval Shipyard at Portsmouth, Virginia, before commencing operations out of Naval Amphibious Base Little Creek at Virginia Beach, Virginia, with Amphibious Forces, United States Atlantic Fleet, on 14 September 1953. The ship then conducted training exercises out of Little Creek before entering the Norfolk Navy Yard for conversion to an LST flotilla flagship, involving the installation of much new communications equipment.

LST-1156 remained on operations out of Little Creek through June 1955. On 1 July 1955 she was named USS Terrebonne Parish.

Following operations in the Caribbean and off North Carolina and overhaul at the Charleston Naval Shipyard at Charleston, South Carolina, Terrebonne Parish conducted a cruise to Lisbon, Portugal, and Port Lyautey, French Morocco, before resuming local operations out of Little Creek. She continued participating in exercises and assault landings in the Caribbean and returned to Norfolk, Virginia, on 14 May 1957 to resume local operations and LST training.

=== First Mediterranean deployment, 1957–1958 ===
On 29 August 1957, Terrebonne Parish cleared Naval Station Norfolk for Morehead City, North Carolina, and, on 30 August 1957, embarked United States Marines, vehicles, and cargo for transport to the Mediterranean. She joined units of the United States Sixth Fleet at Taranto, Italy, on 16 September 1957.

Around September 1957, LST 1157 transported MCB 7, Detachment K (and all of their equipment) from Port Layouty, Morocco too Davisville, RI.

During her subsequent Mediterranean tour of duty, she took part in North Atlantic Treaty Organization (NATO) landing exercises at Saros Gulf, Turkey, and visited ports in Turkey, mainland Greece, mainland Italy, Crete, and Sicily before returning to the United States on 12 February 1958 and resuming local operations out of Little Creek.

=== Second Mediterranean deployment and Caribbean and United States East Coast operations, 1958–1959 ===
Following overhaul and refresher training, Terrebonne Parish again deployed to the Mediterranean for duty with the Sixth Fleet in September 1958, serving as part of Service Force, Mediterranean, before returning westward once again to the United States and operations off the East Coast of the United States and in Caribbean waters.

=== Inland seas cruise, United States East Coast operations, and Mediterranean deployments, 1959–1961 ===
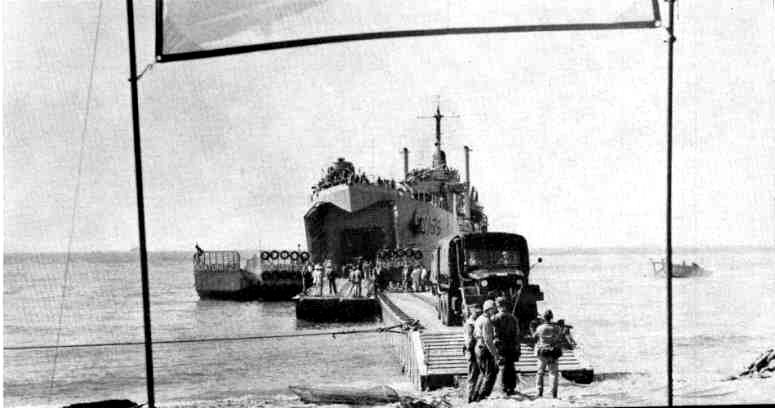
USS Terrebonne Parish (LST-1156) off-loading troops during Sixth Fleet amphibious exercises in December 1961.

On 16 June 1959 Terrebonne Parish commenced an "inland seas" cruise, transiting the St. Lawrence Seaway and calling at Iroquois, Cape Vincent, and Port Weller, Ontario, Canada; Ashtabula, Ohio; Kenosha, Wisconsin; Chicago, Illinois; Milwaukee, Wisconsin; Cleveland, Ohio; Erie, Pennsylvania; Port Colburne, Ontario; and Rochester, New York, before returning to her home base at Little Creek on 6 August.

Terrebonne Parish also participated in Exercise TRALEX in 1959, one of the largest amphibious warfare exercises conducted in that year.

Terrebonne Parish conducted yearly deployments to the Mediterranean, with periodic overhauls and exercises, through 1961.

=== Cuban Missile Crisis, 1962 ===
In late October 1962, after the United States detected the presence of Soviet ballistic missiles in Cuba, the United States instituted a naval blockade – termed a "quarantine" by the United States Government – of Cuba, throwing a naval cordon around the island. During these emergency preparations, Terrebonne Parish operated with the Atlantic Fleet Amphibious Force through December 1962, when the Cuban Missile Crisis finally subsided.

=== United States East Coast operations and Mediterranean deployment, 1963–1964 ===
Attached to Amphibious Forces, Atlantic Fleet, Amphibious Squadron 6, Terrebonne Parish conducted operations off the Virginia Capes in January and February 1963 and then was overhauled in Jacksonville, Florida, before she again departed for the Mediterranean. During her 1963 deployment with the 6th Fleet, Terrebonne Parish participated in MEDLANDEX, a joint American-Spanish exercise in which 3,000 American and Spanish Marines were landed with support from aircraft carrier-based aircraft.

Terrebonne Parish remained in the Mediterranean until February 1964 before returning to the United States for amphibious exercises in the spring of 1964 at Onslow Beach, North Carolina, and off Cape Pendleton, Virginia. She proceeded to New York City in July 1964 to participate as an exhibit in the New York World's Fair before taking part in an amphibious exercise with Marines and United States Naval Academy midshipmen off Camp Pendleton.

=== Mediterranean deployment, 1964–1965 ===
Early in the autumn of 1964, Terrebonne Parish embarked the men and vehicles of "C" Company, 1st Battalion, 2nd Marine Regiment, and proceeded for Huelva, Spain, to take part in "Exercise Steel Pike," in which she became the first LST to "marry" to an eighteen-section causeway for landing her embarked vehicles.

For the remainder of her Mediterranean deployment, Terrebonne Parish took part in landing exercises off Sardinia and Corsica and made visits to ports in Italy, France, Greece, and Spain, spending the Christmas holidays in Barcelona, Spain, in late December 1964 and New Year's Eve (31 December 1964) at Valencia, Spain.

=== Caribbean operations, 1965–1966 ===
Returning home to the United States towards the end of March 1965, Terrebonne Parish transported a United States Marine Corps missile detachment to the Caribbean, and then underwent extensive overhaul for four months by the Bethlehem Steel shipyard at Baltimore, Maryland. After refresher training, Terrebonne Parish got underway for the Caribbean on 3 March 1966 to begin a four-month deployment to participate in exercises and operations involving beachings and landings. She next made two lifts to the Dominican Republic in late August and early September 1965.

During this Caribbean tour, a locking device was developed for the sand flaps on the ship's bow doors to keep them secure while underway, and it was installed on Terrebonne Parish in January 1966 at San Juan, Puerto Rico. Tests proved that the new devices were very efficient. As a result, this modification was approved for all LSTs.

=== Seventh Mediterranean deployment, 1967 ===
Terrebonne Parish commenced her seventh Mediterranean deployment on 30 March 1967. when she embarked Marines of the 1st Battalion, 6th Marine Regiment, at Morehead City and crossed the Atlantic Ocean in company with four minesweepers of Mine Division 83. Upon arriving at Aranci Bay, Sardinia, on 19 April 1967, she joined Amphibious Squadron 6, Task Force 61, and soon participated in "Exercise Fairgame Five," a joint French-American amphibious exercise which brought together elements of the French Army, French Navy, French Commandos, and French Foreign Legion, and a joint United States Navy-United States Marine Corps team.

Terrebonne Parish then headed for the western half of the Mediterranean and proceeded to Italy and Crete for further exercises. While she was at Taormina, Sicily, in late July 1967, volunteers from her ship's company and embarked Marines went ashore to battle a raging brush fire threatening the town of Giardini.

Leaving Taormina on 7 August 1967 and arriving at Porto Scudo, Sardinia, on 12 August 1967, Terrebonne Parish took part in further amphibious exercises before she re-embarked her Marines after field exercises and proceeded to Málaga, Spain, for further amphibious training operations. She subsequently departed Rota, Spain, on 2 September 1967 for her return voyage to the United States.

=== Eighth Mediterranean deployment, 1968 and Caribbean deployment, 1970 ===
Terrebonne Parish deployed to the Mediterranean in 1968 then deployed to the Caribbean early in 1970 as part of the Caribbean Ready Group in Exercise "Carib 1–70," which also included amphibious assault ship USS Guadalcanal (LPH-7), dock landing ship USS Spiegel Grove (LSD-32), attack cargo ship USS Vermilion (AKA-107), and tank landing ship USS Suffolk County (LST-1173). During this deployment, she visited Vieques Island, Puerto Rico, periodically to practice amphibious operations. Other ports visited during this cruise were Mayaguez, Puerto Rico, where the ship's company built playground equipment at a local school; San Juan, Puerto Rico; St. Croix, United States Virgin Islands; Martinique, French West Indies; Colon, Panama; Aruba, Netherlands West Indies; Guantanamo Bay, Cuba; and Roosevelt Roads, Puerto Rico. Terrebonne Parish also participated in an emergency deployment of the Caribbean Ready Group from San Juan, steaming out of sight of land between the islands of Trinidad and Tobago following an attempted coup against the government of Trinidad and Tobago. En route from Aruba, she participated in joint naval exercises with the Venezuelan Navy.

=== United States East Coast operations, 1970 ===
Following return from Carib 1–70, Terrebonne Parish participated in riverine operations in St. Helena Sound, South Carolina. As one of the ships in Amphibious Forces, Atlantic, she earned more Battle E awards than most of the other ships in that command.

In September 1970, Terrebonne Parish steamed in company with the flagship of Commander, Amphibious Forces, Atlantic – amphibious force command ship USS Pocono (AGC-16) – and USS Spiegel Grove – to Halifax, Nova Scotia, Canada, and encountered a confluence of two storms in which she took "green water" on occasion, 25 feet (7.6 meters) over her bows, heavily damaging many weather deck fixtures and equipment. During one 24-hour period, the formation of ships was only able to make one nautical mile (1.85 kilometers) of headway.

=== Ninth Mediterranean deployment, 1970–1971, and Caribbean deployment, 1971 ===
Terrebone Parish returned to the Mediterranean in late 1970 for her ninth deployment.

In 1971, still homeported at Little Creek, Virginia and operating under command of Amphibious Forces, Atlantic, Terrebonne Parish deployed to the Caribbean for exercises and training activities. These included an operation from 5 to 10 August 1971 in which United States Army and Panamanian National Guard units participated.

== Transfer to Spain, 1971, and Spanish Navy career, 1971–1994 ==
Soon after returning from Panama, Terrbonne Parish began preparations for her upcoming transfer to the Spanish government. On 29 October 1971, the ship was decommissioned and loaned to the Spanish Navy at Little Creek the same day. Terrebonne Parish was struck from the Naval Vessel Register on 1 November 1976 and sold outright to Spain on 17 May 1978.

Renamed Velasco (L-11), the ship served Spain until decommissioned by the Spanish Navy and used as a training hulk for UOE ("Unidad de Operaciones Especiales", a Naval Special Operations Unit) at Arsenal de La Carraca in San Fernando, Spain. She was scrapped in 1994.

== See also ==
- List of United States Navy LSTs
