= USS Traverse County =

United States Navy tank landing ship

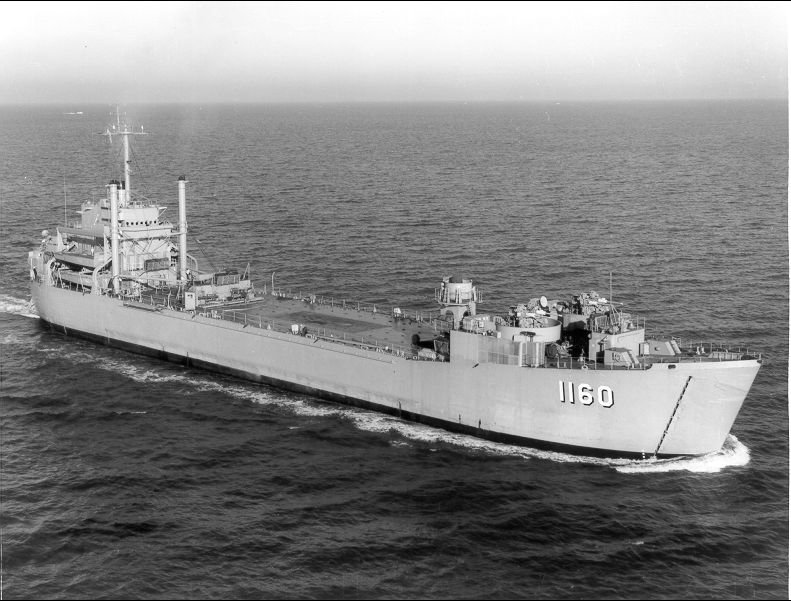
- USS Traverse County (LST-1160) ca. 1969

History

United States
- Name: USS Traverse County
- Namesake: Traverse County in Minnesota
- Builder: Bath Iron Works, Bath, Maine
- Laid down: 18 December 1952
- Launched: 3 October 1953
- Commissioned: 19 December 1953
- Decommissioned: Autumn 1970
- In service: with Military Sealift Command in non-commissioned service from 7 June 1972 until 1 November 1973
- Renamed: USS Traverse County 1 July 1955 (previously USS LST-1160); Became USNS Traverse County 7 June 1972
- Reclassified: T-LST-1160 7 June 1972
- Stricken: 1 November 1973
- Honors and awards: Battle Efficiency "E" in 1955
- Fate: Laid up in the National Defense Reserve Fleet 1973; Leased to Peru 7 August 1984; Sold to Peru 26 April 1999
- Notes: In commissioned service as USS LST-1160 1953–1955 and as USS Traverse County (LST-1160) 1955–1970; in non-commissioned service with Military Sealift Command as USNS Traverse County (T-LST-1160) 1972–1973

General characteristics
- Class & type: LST-1156-(Terrebonne Parish-) class landing ship tank
- Displacement: 2,590 tons (light); 5,800 tons (full)
- Length: 384 ft (117 m)
- Beam: 55 ft (17 m)
- Draft: 17 ft (5.2 m)
- Installed power: 6,000 shp (4.48 MW)
- Propulsion: Four General Motors 16-278A diesel engines, two controllable-pitch propellers
- Speed: 14 knots
- Boats & landing craft carried: 3 x landing craft, vehicle, personnel LCVPs, 1 x landing craft personnel (large) LCPL
- Troops: 395 (15 officers, 380 enlisted men)
- Complement: 205 (16 officers, 189 enlisted men)
- Armor: 3 × twin 3 in (76 mm) dual-purpose gun mounts; 5 × single 20 mm antiaircraft gun mounts

USS Traverse County (LST-1160), previously USS LST-1160, was a United States Navy landing ship tank (LST) in commission from 1953 to 1970, and which then saw non-commissioned Military Sealift Command service as USNS Traverse County (T-LST-1160) from 1972 to 1973.

== Construction and commissioning ==
USS LST-1160 was designed under project SCB 9A and laid down on 18 December 1952 at Bath, Maine, by the Bath Iron Works. She was launched on 3 October 1953, sponsored by Mrs. Omar R. King, and commissioned on 19 December 1953.

== Atlantic, Caribbean, and Mediterranean service ==
Late in January 1954, LST-1160 moved, from Boston, Massachusetts, where she had completed outfitting, to Naval Amphibious Base Little Creek at Virginia Beach, Virginia. On 26 March 1954, after seven weeks of shakedown training in the Virginia Capes operating area and three weeks of post-shakedown availability, LST-1160 became an active unit of the United States Atlantic Fleet Amphibious Force. Between the spring of 1954 and the summer of 1955, she completed seven training exercises to sharpen her skill as an amphibious warfare ship. Those drills frequently took her south to the West Indies, most often to Vieques Island near Puerto Rico, where embarked United States Marines practiced amphibious landings.

On 1 July 1955, LST-1160 was named USS Traverse County (LST-1160). Not long thereafter, she was awarded the Battle Efficiency "E" as the outstanding ship of Landing Ship Tank Flotilla 4.

Late in 1955, Traverse County entered the Philadelphia Naval Shipyard at Philadelphia, Pennsylvania, for a four-month overhaul. She exited the shipyard in April 1956 and, following a month of refresher training, resumed operations out of Little Creek. The remainder of 1956 saw her periodically embarking Marines at Morehead City, North Carolina, and putting them ashore at Little Creek and at nearby Camp Pendleton.

At the beginning of 1957, Traverse County completed preparations for her first deployment with the United States Sixth Fleet. From 1957 through 1968, Traverse County performed eight tours of duty in the Mediterranean. Most often, her operations with the Sixth Fleet included visits to ports in Spain, France, Italy, Greece, and Turkey, and along the North African coast. She often conducted training exercises with units of friendly foreign navies. However, during her 1958 deployment, a crisis erupted in Lebanon at the far eastern end of the Mediterranean, and in July 1958 Traverse County joined other Sixth Fleet units and Amphibious Squadron 6 landing ships tank in landing Marines at Beirut to help stabilize the situation. The remainder of her Mediterranean assignments proved to be more routine in nature.

When not attached to the Sixth Fleet, Traverse County operated out of Little Creek in Virginia. Her western Atlantic duties frequently took her to the West Indies and the Caribbean where, in addition to the usual amphibious exercises, she performed supply missions to various American bases in the area under the auspices of the Commander, Service Force, Atlantic Fleet. Such was her assignment in the fall of 1962 when American surveillance of Cuba uncovered the siting of offensive ballistic missiles on that island by the Soviet Union. When the Cuban Missile Crisis occurred, President John F. Kennedy invoked a successful blockade, or quarantine, of Cuba to secure the removal of the missiles. During that operation, Traverse County provided support as a combat-ready unit. However, the Soviet Union withdrew the missiles and the tension abated, enabling Traverse County to resume her normal routine early in 1963. She returned to supplying Caribbean bases and conducting amphibious exercises at Little Creek, at Onslow Beach, North Carolina, and at Vieques Island near Puerto Rico.

The Cuban Missile Crisis proved to be Traverse County's last internationally significant operation. After 1962, she resumed her routine, alternating Mediterranean deployments with East Coast of the United States operations. She completed her eighth and last Sixth Fleet assignment in December 1968. During 1969, she conducted another series of amphibious exercises at her old haunts, Little Creek, Onslow Beach, and Vieques Island. Similar operations carried her into 1970.

== Latin American operations ==
On 7 March 1970 she headed for the Panama Canal and a tour of special duty. After transporting the 8th Marine Engineering Battalion from Morehead City, North Carolina, to Vieques Island, she arrived at Colon, Panama Canal Zone, on 12 March 1970. She transited the Panama Canal and embarked scientists and equipment of the Smithsonian Institution for research operations in the vicinity of the Secas Islands of Panama. That duty lasted until 3 April 1970 when she returned to Rodman Naval Station in the Canal Zone.

Between 3 April 1970 and 24 April 1970, Traverse County transported United States Army Reserve troops and their equipment between Rio Hato and Rodman Naval Station and carried Operation Handclasp supplies to Guayaquil, Ecuador. On 27 April 1970, she reembarked the Smithsonian scientists for another week of research operations. Upon her return to Rodman Naval Station early in May 1970, she entered the Panama Canal Company's Mount Hope Shipyard for repairs. She exited the shipyard on 11 June 1970, retransited the canal, and joined the Caribbean Amphibious Ready Group for a day before returning to Rodman Naval Station for further orders. Late in June 1970, she transported more Army reservists between Rio Hato and Rodman Naval Station.

== Decommissioning ==
On 7 July 1970, Traverse County headed back to the United States for inactivation. She reached Little Creek on 15 July 1970. Later that autumn, Traverse County was decommissioned. Sometime thereafter, she was moved to the Atlantic Reserve Fleet berthing area at Orange, Texas.

== Military Sealift Command service ==
Traverse County was reactivated on 7 June 1973 to serve as a cargo ship in a non-commissioned status with a civil service crew with the Military Sealift Command, being designated the United States Naval Ship USNS Traverse County (T-LST-1160). This service continued until she was stricken from the Navy List on 1 November 1973. At that time, she was transferred to the Maritime Administration for layup in the National Defense Reserve Fleet at Suisun Bay, Benicia, California.

== Transfer to Peru ==
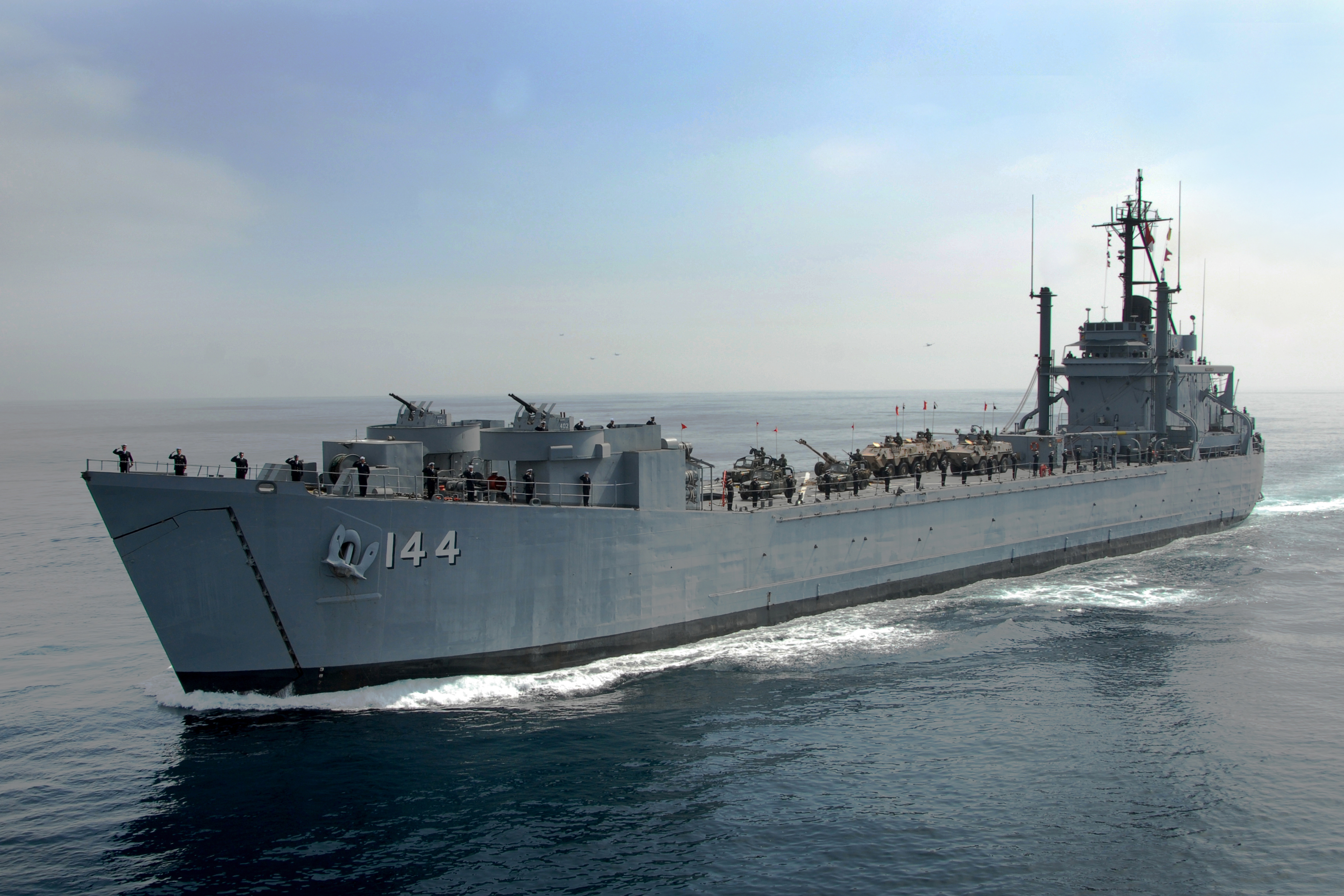
BAP Eten (DT-144) in 2011.

On 7 August 1984, Traverse County and three of her sister ships -- USS Waldo County (LST-1163), USS Walworth County (LST-1164), and USS Washoe County (LST-1165)—were leased to Peru, and Traverse County was commissioned into service in the Peruvian Navy as BAP Eten (DT-144) on 4 March 1985. Peru renewed the lease on all four ships in August 1989 and August 1994, and the United States sold all four outright to Peru under the Security Assistance Program on 26 April 1999; all four were struck from the U.S. Naval Register on the day of the sale.

== See also ==
- List of United States Navy LSTs
