= USS Windham County =

United States Navy landing ship tank

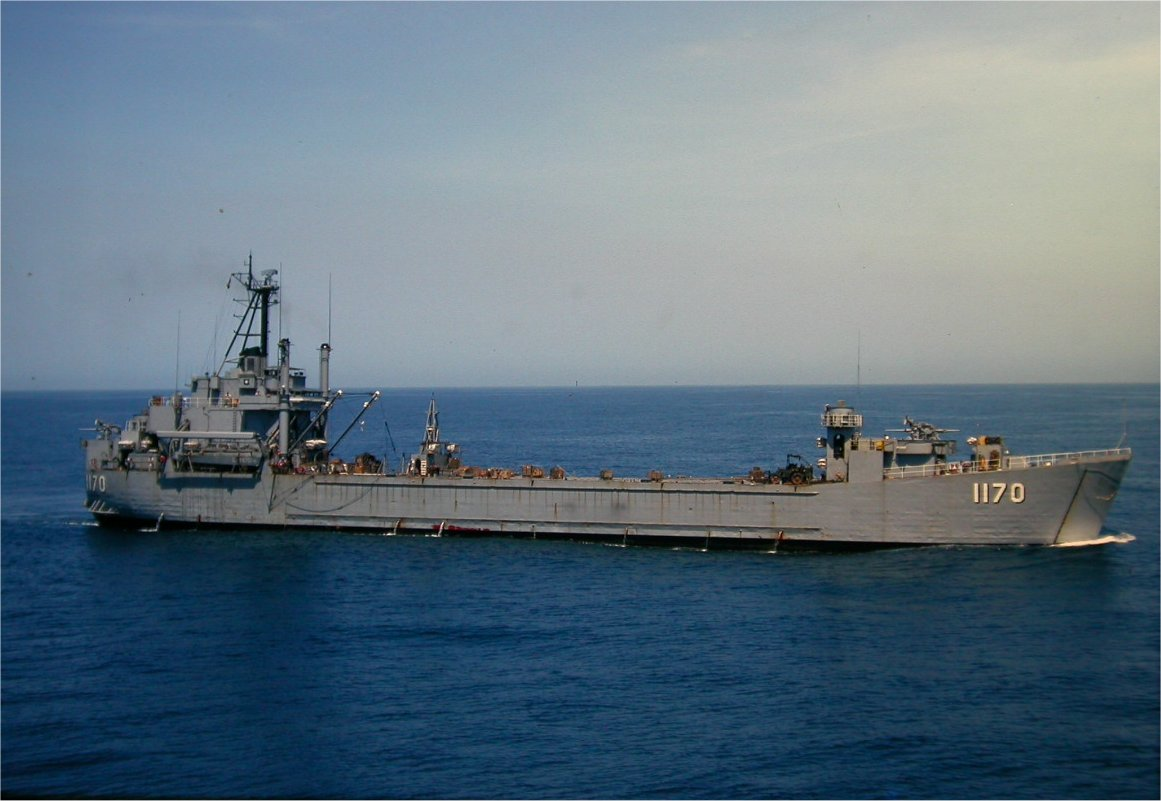
- USS Windham County (LST-1170) off South Vietnam, ca. 1966

History

United States
- Name: USS Windham County
- Namesake: Windham County in Connecticut and Windham County in Vermont
- Builder: Christy Corporation, Sturgeon Bay, Wisconsin
- Laid down: 21 April 1953
- Launched: 22 May 1954
- Commissioned: 15 December 1954
- Decommissioned: 1 June 1973
- Renamed: USS Windham County 1 July 1955 (previously was USS LST-1170)
- Stricken: 6 August 1989
- Honors and awards: 3 Navy Unit Commendations, 3 Meritorious Unit Commendations, and 13 battle stars for Vietnam War service
- Fate: Transferred to Turkey 1973; Became Turkish training ship TCG Ertugrul (L-401)
- Notes: In commissioned service as USS LST-1170 1954–1955 and as USS Windham County (LST-1170) 1955–1973

Turkey
- Name: TCG Ertugrul (L 401)
- Acquired: 1 June 1973
- Out of service: 3 March 2017

General characteristics
- Class & type: LST-1156-(Terrebonne Parish-) class landing ship tank
- Displacement: 2,590 tons (light); 5,800 tons (full)
- Length: 384 ft (117 m)
- Beam: 55 ft (17 m)
- Draft: 17 ft (5.2 m)
- Installed power: 6,000 shp (4.48 MW)
- Propulsion: Four General Motors 16-278A diesel engines, two controllable-pitch propellers
- Speed: 14 knots (25 km/h)
- Boats & landing craft carried: 3 x landing craft, vehicle, personnel LCVPs, 1 x landing craft personnel (large) LCPL
- Troops: 395 (15 officers, 380 enlisted men)
- Complement: 205 (16 officers, 189 enlisted men)
- Armor: 3 × twin 3 in (76 mm) dual-purpose gun mounts; 5 × single 20 mm antiaircraft gun mounts

USS Windham County (LST-1170), previously USS LST-1170, was a United States Navy landing ship tank (LST) in commission from 1954 to 1973 which saw service in the Atlantic, Caribbean, and Pacific and served in the Vietnam War.

== Construction and commissioning ==
USS LST-1170 was designed under project SCB 9A and laid down on 21 April 1953 by the Christy Corporation, Sturgeon Bay, Wisconsin. She was launched on 22 May 1954, sponsored by Mrs. Joseph McCarthy, and commissioned on 15 December 1954.

== Atlantic, Caribbean, and Mediterranean service ==
LST-1170 joined the United States Atlantic Fleet at her home port, Naval Amphibious Base Little Creek at Virginia Beach, Virginia, in January 1955. Following shakedown and type training, she was renamed USS Windham County (LST-1170) on 1 July 1955 and spent much of July and August 1955 in more training exercises. She then helped to support Operation Caesar, an underwater surveillance project, which lasted through the end of 1955.

On 21 February 1956, Windham County reported to the Norfolk Naval Shipyard at Portsmouth, Virginia, for overhaul and conversion.

Early January 1957 LST 1170 transported MCB 7, Detachment K (with all of their equipment) and a Detachment of Marines from Davisville, RI to Port Layouty, Morocco stopping at Lisbon Portugal for liberty.

From January 1957 to mid-March 1957, Windham County operated off the Virginia Capes area. On 14 March 1957, after a brief stop at Davisville, Rhode Island, Windham County proceeded to the Caribbean for operations off Barbados. Upon returning to Little Creek on 1 April 1957, she operated from there until 2 May 1957, when she was deployed to the Mediterranean Sea for a tour of duty with the United States Sixth Fleet. During the cruise, she made stops at Tangier, Morocco; Spain; Malta; Italy; and Gibraltar. She returned to Davisville on 1 October 1957, then headed for Little Creek, arriving there on 18 October 1957.

Windham County got underway for the Caribbean on 14 November 1957 for exercises. After returning to Little Creek on 26 November 1957, she ended 1957 undergoing routine upkeep.

== Pacific service ==
In January 1958, Windham County transited the Panama Canal and arrived at San Diego, on 27 January 1958. Following some four months of operations on the United States West Coast, she sailed for the Western Pacific (WestPac) on 6 June 1958, touched at Pearl Harbor, Hawaii, and arrived in Yokosuka, Japan, for a six-month deployment. While lifting United States Marine Corps units and cargo, she visited Kure, Kobe, Yokohama, and Sasebo, Japan; Subic Bay in the Philippines; Okinawa; Formosa; South Korea; and Hong Kong.

Windham County returned to San Diego on 10 December 1958. The ship engaged in three full-scale amphibious warfare exercises the first half of 1959. She then operated along the southern California coast until 28 November 1959 when she headed north, arriving at San Francisco, California, on 1 December 1959.

Following a two-month overhaul, Windham County returned to San Diego and spent the late winter and early spring of 1960 in intensive refresher training. The ship prepared for a change of her home port from San Diego to Yokosuka, where she was to become a unit of Landing Ship Tank Division 92 of Landing Ship Squadron 9. On 16 June 1960, the ship departed San Diego, and she arrived at Yokosuka on 19 July 1960.

In September 1960, Windham County received notice that she and landing ship tank USS Whitfield County (LST-1169) would participate in a United Nations troop lift from Malaya to the Republic of the Congo. The two ships rendezvoused at Okinawa, then on 26 September 1960 departed for Singapore, where they arrived on 30 September 1960. Departing Singapore on 3 October 1960, the two ships arrived at Port Swettenham, Malaya, on 4 October 1960, where Windham County embarked 300 Malayan troops. The ships then steamed for 27 consecutive days, crossing the Indian Ocean, rounding the Cape of Good Hope on 22 October 1960, and navigating 82 nautical miles (150 kilometers) up the Congo River, before arriving at Matadi, Republic of the Congo, on 31 October 1960. They departed Matadi on 2 November 1960 and arrived at Cape Town, South Africa, on 11 November 1960. They then visited Singapore and Hong Kong before returning to Yokosuka on 20 December I960, where Windham County spent the rest of the year.

On 4 January 1961, Windham County stood out to sea to carry Marine Corps troops from Iwakuni, Japan, to Naval Air Station Cubi Point, the Philippines. During February 1961, she carried another group of Marines from Okinawa to Numazu, Japan. On 24 March 1961, she began a period of shuttling Marines and equipment between Yokosuka and Okinawa which lasted until early in May 1961. She then participated in Southeast Asia Treaty Organization (SEATO) Operation Pony Express on North Borneo in Indonesia. Upon the completion of this mission, she returned via Subic Bay to Yokosuka, where she arrived on 9 June 1961.

On 1 August 1961, Windham County entered the Ship Repair Facility, Yokosuka, for an overhaul. Beginning on 23 October 1961, she conducted a three-week underway training period, and, on 20 November 1961, she commenced two weeks of amphibious training with the Japanese Maritime Self-Defense Force. She then spent the remainder of 1961 at Yokosuka undergoing upkeep.

Windham County sailed on 25 January 1962 for Numazu, Japan, to embark Marines. She took them to Okinawa, before visiting Hong Kong and Subic Bay. Shortly thereafter, she took part in SEATO Operation Tunlungan at Mindoro, the Philippines, and then reembarked participating troops for transport to Naha and Iwakuni, Japan.

Windham, County visited Bangkok, Thailand, in June 1962 and in late July 1962 went to Inchon, South Korea, to pick up United States Army troops bound for Pohang, South Korea. Upon completion of that task, she returned to Yokosuka. Runs to Numazu and Naha with troops in October 1962 preceded her return to Yokosuka for upkeep. December 1962 brought her independent ship's exercises and Marine troop lifts from Numazu to Naha.

On 3 January 1963, Windham County got underway for Hong Kong, where she served as a station ship and did much to promote the People-to-People Program. She returned to Yokosuka in February 1963, but left on 2 March 1963 to lift Marines to Taiwan and then spent the rest of March and most of April 1963 in upkeep in Yokosuka. From May through September 1963, Windham County underwent an overhaul which began in Sasebo and was completed at Yokosuka. October and November 1963 were devoted to underway and refresher training. On 5 December 1963, she headed for Okinawa for type training and a troop lift back to Japan. After unloading her passengers at Numazu, she returned to Yokosuka on 18 December 1963 for an inspection and upkeep period.

Windham County sailed on 2 January 1964 for South Korea to participate in Operation Firehouse, a cold-weather amphibious assault exercise conducted at Chumunjin, South Korea. Late in January 1964 she returned to Yokosuka for upkeep and left on 26 February 1964 to take part in Operation Backpack, a joint American-Taiwanese practice amphibious assault which took place at Che Cheng, Taiwan. She returned to Yokosuka on 26 March 1964 and, from April until June 1964, conducted lifts and training exercises which took her to Taiwan; Iwakuni, Japan; Okinawa; and Hong Kong. On 17 June 1964, Windham County took on Republic of Korea Army students and carried them to Pusan, South Korea, to observe a demonstration of amphibious and beachhead staging techniques.

== Vietnam War service 1964–1966 ==
On 21 July 1964, Windham County got underway for operations in Okinawan waters. While these exercises were still in progress, the Gulf of Tonkin Incident occurred in early August 1964, resulting in a rapid buildup of American forces in South Vietnam and in nearby waters. Windham County loaded Marines and proceeded to the South China Sea, where she remained on station from 16 August 1964 to 28 September 1964 and spent 56 continuous days at sea. Windham County returned to Yokosuka on 19 October 1964. She visited Beppu, Japan, from 19 November 1964 to 23 November 1964 and participated in a variety of People-to-People Program activities. She proceeded to Iwakuni, Japan, for special operations which kept her busy until the latter part of December 1964, when she returned to Yokosuka for upkeep.

During January 1965, Windham County was in Yokosuka for upkeep and type training. On 6 February 1965, she left for training at Pohang, South Korea, but was diverted to Okinawa on 8 February 1965 in a general alert of United States Seventh Fleet forces. From March through May 1965, she was involved in shuttles of personnel and cargo from Okinawa to Da Nang, South Vietnam. On 31 May 1965, she returned to Yokosuka for upkeep. Windham, County departed Yokosuka on 23 June 1965 and participated in various lift operations between Okinawa and South Vietnam. Beginning on 5 September 1965, she commenced an overhaul at Yokosuka. Leaving the shipyard on 12 October 1965, Windham County was engaged in personnel- and cargo-carrying missions along the coast of South Vietnam before returning to Yokosuka on 10 December 1965 for upkeep.

Windham County departed on 6 January 1966 for Naha, Okinawa, and carried out numerous shuttles along the South Vietnamese coast. She arrived in Yokosuka on 5 June 1966 for hull repairs and, on 1 August 1966, commenced regular yard overhaul in Yokosuka. She began sea trials on 7 December 1966 and ended 1966 with type training and upkeep.

== Vietnam War service 1967 ==
Refresher training occupied January 1967, and Windham County sailed on 15 February 1967 for almost two months of operations off the coast of South Vietnam. On 15 April 1967, she headed for Okinawa and arrived at Naha on 20 April 1967. She returned to Yokosuka on 24 April 1967 but, after a month of upkeep, got underway again on 26 May 1967 to resume transport duties off South Vietnam. Windham County returned to Yokosuka on 20 July 1967 and entered normal upkeep. She departed on 9 August 1967 and, during the period of 19 August 1967 through 4 September 1967, was involved in Operation Schoolhouse Lift, delivering prefabricated structures to small villages throughout the Philippines.

On 4 September 1967, Windham County departed Manila and proceeded to Da Nang. Upon completion of several missions, she received upkeep in Subic Bay. After departing that base on 4 October 1967, she returned, via Okinawa, to Yokosuka for a short upkeep period. She departed on 29 October 1967 and headed back to South Vietnam. She stopped briefly at Naha en route and also was diverted from her planned course to evade Typhoon Emma but finally reached Danang on 9 November 1967. From 10 to 16 November 1967, she supported Operation Badger Hunt and then moved to Đức Phổ to conduct salvage operations for landing ships tank USS Clarke County and USS Iredell County, which had run aground there. After Iredell County had been pulled free, Windham County escorted her to Da Nang. Windham County then returned to Đức Phổ to provide a ready helicopter for subsequent operations. During the remainder of her deployment to South Vietnam, she spent most of her time carrying troops, equipment, and mail to support operations ashore. On 27 December 1967, she was detached from these duties and proceeded to Japan.

== Vietnam War service 1968 ==
Windham County arrived in Yokosuka on 5 January 1968 and commenced a period of upkeep and inspections. She got underway for Kaohsiung, Taiwan, on 29 January 1968 to support Exercise Former Champ, a joint United States-Taiwanese amphibious exercise. While in Taiwan, she also participated in amphibious Exercise Final Round. Upon completing these, she headed for Yokosuka on 5 April 1968 and arrived there on 10 April 1968. She promptly began a cycle of upkeep, type training, and inspection.

On 6 June 1968, Windham County left Yokosuka to return, via Okinawa, to South Vietnam to serve as a support ship for Task Group (TG) 117.2 in the Mekong Delta. She arrived at Wunder Beach, South Vietnam, on 17 June 1968 and unloaded 152 jeeps there before moving on to Vung Tau, which she reached on 20 June 1968 and where she began almost two months of duty supporting riverine warfare operations. On 15 August 1968, she set out for Thailand. After a five-day visit to Bangkok, she headed for Japan. However, Typhoon Wendy prevented her from stopping at Okinawa, and she proceeded to Yokosuka for a period of upkeep, arriving on 24 August 1968. She again departed Yokosuka on 3 October 1968 to return to South Vietnam. After several weeks of action, she reported to Subic Bay on 14 November 1968 for upkeep. She left the Philippines on 5 December 1968 and arrived at Yokosuka on 13 December 1968.

== Vietnam War service 1969–1972 ==
After a period of upkeep and inspections, Windham County departed Yokosuka on 10 March 1969 for South Vietnam. She spent the remainder of March, all of April, and the first part of May 1969 operating in the Mekong Delta. She departed on 10 May 1969 and returned, via Subic Bay and Hong Kong, to Yokosuka on 1 June 1969. She left Japan on 23 July 1969 and set a course for South Vietnam.

Windham County began 1970 in preparation for overhaul at Yokosuka, which was completed on 7 April 1970. She sailed on 13 April 1970 for South Korea to take part in Operation Golden Dragon, a joint American-South Korean amphibious exercise. She returned to Yokosuka on 5 May 1970 for upkeep and training. She left Yokosuka on 30 May 1970 and proceeded to the Philippines, arriving at Subic Bay on 13 June 1970 to begin exercises and upkeep. After a brief trip to Hong Kong, she returned to Yokosuka on 20 August 1970. From August through early December 1970, she was involved in shuttles between Okinawa and Japan and routine upkeep and inspection. On 12 December 1970, she got underway for South Vietnam.

Windham County remained in the combat zone for the rest of 1970 and through 23 February 1971, when she was relieved and returned to Yokosuka, arriving on 12 March 1971. From then through 29 July 1971, Windham County was involved in routine shuttles between Okinawa, Numazu, Subic Bay, and Yokosuka. On 29 July 1971, she arrived in South Vietnam and engaged in various operations off the coast. On 7 September 1971, she was relieved and returned to Yokosuka, arriving there on 27 September 1971 to begin a period of restricted availability. Beginning on 9 November 1971, she made several shuttles to Okinawa and Numazu and went to Hong Kong. She was relieved on 17 December 1971 and returned to Yokosuka on 23 December 1971, remaining there for the rest of the year.

Windham County departed Yokosuka in early February 1972 to resume her shuttle operations between Japan, Okinawa, and South Vietnam. In October 1972 she visited Singapore and Bangkok; in November 1972 she stopped in Hong Kong and Taiwan. She returned to Yokosuka in December 1972.

== Vietnam War awards ==
For her Vietnam War service, Windham County received three Navy Unit Commendations, three Meritorious Unit Commendations, and 11 battle stars. The battle stars were for:

- Vietnam Defense 3 August 1965 – 8 August 1965, 19 August 1965 – 24 August 1965, and 31 October 1965 – 11 December 1965
- Vietnamese Counteroffensive 16 January 1966 – 22 February 1966, 6 March 1966 – 11 March 1966, and 21 March 1966 – 23 March 1966
- Vietnamese Counteroffensive Phase II 14 April 1967 – 16 April 1967
- Vietnamese Counteroffensive Phase III 29 June 1967 – 7 July 1967 and 8 November 1967 – 4 December 1967
- Vietnamese Counteroffensive Phase IV 15 June 1968 – 30 June 1968
- Vietnamese Counteroffensive Phase V 1 July 1968 – 19 August 1968
- Tet 69 Counteroffensive 1 May 1969 – 13 May 1969
- Vietnam Summer/Fall 1969 5 August 1969 – 5 October 1969
- Vietnam Winter-Spring 1970 20 November 1968 – 27 November 1969
- Vietnamese Counteroffensive Phase VII 14 December 1970 – 26 February 1971
- Consolidation I 28 July 1971 – 9 September 1971
- Consolidation II 27 February 1972 – 29 March 1972
- Vietnam Ceasefire 30 March 1972 – 3 May 1972, 4 September 1972 – 9 October 1972, and 17 October 1972 – 16 November 1972

== Decommissioning and transfer to Turkey ==
After Windham County returned to Yokosuka in December 1972, an intensive period of preparation for her transfer to the Turkish Navy under the Security Assistance Program began. She was decommissioned on 1 June 1973 and turned over to the Turkish Navy for use as a training ship. She was renamed Turkish Republic Ship (TCG) Ertugrul (L401).

The United States Navy finally struck Windham County's name from the Navy List on 6 August 1989.

== See also ==
- List of United States Navy LSTs
