= USS Tioga County =

US naval vessel (1953–1970)

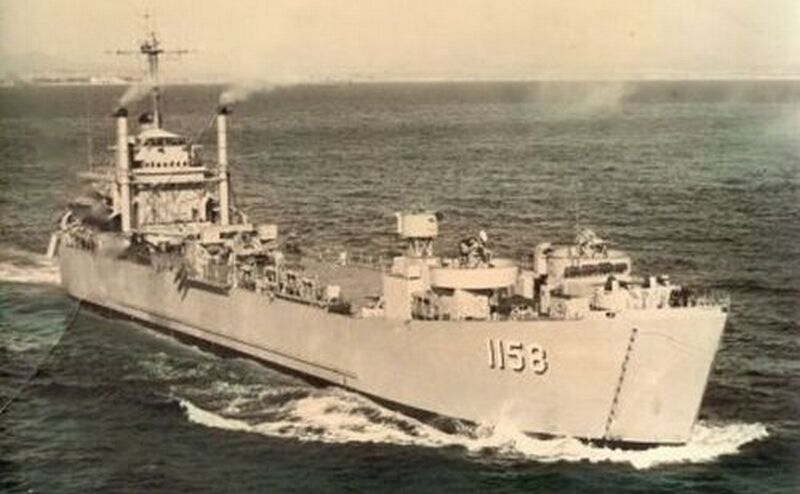
- USS Tioga County (LST-1158)

History

United States
- Name: USS Tioga County
- Namesake: Tioga County in New York and Tioga County in Pennsylvania
- Builder: Bath Iron Works, Bath, Maine
- Laid down: 16 June 1952
- Launched: 11 April 1953
- Commissioned: 20 June 1953
- Decommissioned: 23 December 1970
- In service: with Military Sealift Command in non-commissioned service from mid-1972 until 1 November 1973
- Renamed: USS Tioga County 2 July 1955 (previously USS LST-1158); Became USNS Tioga County mid-1972
- Reclassified: T-LST-1158 mid-1972
- Stricken: 1 November 1973
- Honors and awards: 3 battle stars for Vietnam War service
- Fate: Sold for scrapping 21 July 2005
- Notes: In commissioned service as USS LST-1158 1953–55 and as USS Tioga County (LST-1158) 1955-70; in non-commissioned service with Military Sealift Command as USNS Tioga County (T-LST-1158) 1972-73

General characteristics
- Class & type: LST-1156-(Terrebonne Parish-) class landing ship tank
- Displacement: 2,590 tons (light); 5,800 tons (full)
- Length: 384 ft (117 m)
- Beam: 56 ft (17 m)
- Draft: 17 ft (5.2 m)
- Installed power: 6,000 shp (4.48 MW)
- Propulsion: Four General Motors 16-278A diesel engines, two controllable-pitch propellers
- Speed: 14 knots (maximum sustained speed) and 12 knots (normal cruising speed)
- Range: 14,000 NM (at maximum sustained speed) and 18,000 NM (at normal cruising speed)
- Boats & landing craft carried: 3 x landing craft, vehicle, personnel LCVPs, 1 x landing craft personnel (large) LCPL
- Troops: 395 (15 officers, 380 enlisted men)
- Complement: 205 (16 officers, 189 enlisted men)
- Armor: 3 × twin 3 in (76 mm) dual-purpose gun mounts; 5 × single 20 mm antiaircraft gun mounts

USS Tioga County (LST-1158), previously USS LST-1158, was a United States Navy landing ship tank (LST) in commission from 1953 to 1970, and which then saw non-commissioned Military Sealift Command service as USNS Tioga County (T-LST-1158) from 1972 to 1973.

== Construction and commissioning ==
USS LST-1158 was designed under project SCB 9A and laid down on 16 June 1952 at Bath, Maine, by Bath Iron Works. She was launched on 11 April 1953, sponsored by Mrs. Joseph A. Callaghan, and commissioned on 20 June 1953.

== Pacific service ==
Following shakedown out of Naval Amphibious Base Little Creek at Virginia Beach, Virginia, LST-1158 shifted to the United States West Coast in January 1954 and operated out of San Diego, California. For the next few years, she worked along the U.S. West Coast and in the Hawaiian Islands. On 2 July 1955, LST-1158 was renamed USS Tioga County (LST-1158).

Tioga County conducted two Western Pacific (WestPac) deployments between January 1957 and mid-1960, interspersed with local operations and cruises to the Hawaiian Islands. While en route from the Philippines to Yokosuka, Japan, Tioga County went to the aid of a stricken Taiwanese fishing vessel on 2 February 1960. Bucking gale-force winds and 17-foot (5.2-meter) seas, Tioga County passed lines to the foundering craft and drew her alongside. Tioga County's crew passed lifejackets down to the fishermen and brought them up via a Jacob's ladder, including one of the nine who had injured his leg.

Following her return to the U.S. West Coast from the second Western Pacific deployment, Tioga County resumed local operations out of San Diego. In August 1961, she sailed north for Alaskan waters and operated in the Aleutian Islands for three months. On one occasion off Attu, Tioga County battled high seas and gales up to 80 knots. She returned to San Diego on 1 December 1961.

Tioga County was subjected to at least two simulated biological weapon attacks in the first half of 1963 under Project SHAD.

Sailing for Hawaii following leave and upkeep, Tioga County participated in joint United States Army-United States Navy exercises in the islands before returning to the California coast. She conducted local operations and training out of San Diego, on occasion between the U.S. West Coast and the Hawaiian Islands, into 1965.

On 31 May 1965 of that year, Tioga County was selected as the test bed for the Sea Sparrow antiaircraft and antimissile missile, and she participated in these tests until June 1965, when she was commended by the Raytheon Corporation for her part in the development of the missile system.

In July 1965, Tioga County departed San Diego, bound for Hawaii. During her five-month deployment, she operated out of Pearl Harbor and worked with the U.S. Army 25th Infantry Division on exercises.

== Vietnam War service ==
Although Tioga County was scheduled to spend Christmas 1965 in San Diego, a change of plans sent her to the Far East for her third Western Pacific deployment.

Arriving at Subic Bay, the Philippines, en route to Vietnamese waters, Tioga County loaded barbed wire and aviation fuel tanks and got underway for Da Nang, South Vietnam in mid-January 1966. After delivering her cargo there, she embarked troops and served as a "combat taxi" for the U.S. Army 101st Airborne Division, making troop and vehicle lifts between Phan Rang and Tuy Hòa and carrying up to 1,000 troops each time.

After shifting briefly to Subic Bay for a drydocking for repair of her screws, Tioga County soon returned to Vietnamese waters to take part in Operation Double Eagle, off Quảng Ngãi Province. She made numerous beachings to load troops and cargo and earned her first engagement star for this action.

Following this logistics support evolution, Tioga County returned to the U.S. West Coast via Hong Kong, Yokosuka, Japan, and Pearl Harbor, and reached San Diego on 14 May 1966.

Tioga County conducted local operations along the U.S. West Coast until 2 March 1967, when she got underway for her fourth Western Pacific deployment. Proceeding via Pearl Harbor, Guam, and Subic Bay, she arrived at Da Nang on 28 April 1967 with 43 vehicles and other cargo.

Following a run to Okinawa, Tioga County returned to Vietnam and became the first landing ship tank of her class to participate in duty with the Mobile Riverine Assault Force.

Arriving at Vũng Tàu on 6 June 1967, Tioga County loaded 30,000 cases of C rations, 700 tons of U.S. Army ammunition, and 350 tons of miscellaneous cargo. She transited the Song Cua Thiệu to the 9th Infantry Regiment's advanced base at Dong Tam Base Camp and took on board 369 men of "B" and "C" companies of the 3rd Battalion, 9th Infantry.

Under the aegis of Commander, River Flotilla 1, Tioga County served in the Rung Sat Special Zone of the Mekong Delta region, supporting "search-and-destroy" missions against Viet Cong (VC) troops. She acted as a "Mekong Hilton" to the men who were based on board and served as a mobile ammunition and supply depot. In addition, she accompanied the rest of the riverine warfare force up the Song Soirap to Nha Be for close support of both artillery and infantry combat operations.

Difficulty with Tioga County's generators forced her back to Subic Bay for repairs before she returned to Vietnamese waters in late July 1967. She then joined Amphibious Ready Group Alfa off the coast of Vietnam near the Vietnamese Demilitarized Zone (DMZ). Here she participated in Operation Beacon Gate, Operation Beacon Guide, and Operation Beacon Point. During this period, in addition to logistics support operations, Tioga County conducted her first combat landing as her LCVPs put a U.S. Marine landing team ashore on the coastal region of Quảng Ngãi Province, a known VC stronghold near the DMZ, with the initial landing wave.

Detached from this duty on 6 September 1967, Tioga County sailed for the United States, steamed via Yokosuka and Pearl Harbor, and arrived back at her homeport on Navy Day, 27 October 1967. She conducted local operations and training out of San Diego into 1970, before she conducted her fifth and final Western Pacific deployment from 5 January 1970 to 7 July 1970.

Tioga County received three battle stars for Vietnam War service, for:

- Vietnamese Counteroffensive 11 January 1966 – 27 January 1966, 10 February 1966 – 22 February 1966, and 5 March 1966 – 19 March 1966
- Vietnamese Counteroffensive Phase II 29 April 1967 – 4 May 1967
- Vietnamese Counteroffensive Phase III 2 June 1967 – 21 June 1967, 22 July 1967 – 17 August 1967, and 29 August 1967 – 9 September 1967.

== Decommissioning ==
Decommissioned on 23 December 1970, Tioga County was placed in reserve at San Diego with the inactive fleet.

== Military Sealift Command service ==
Tioga County was reactivated in mid-1972 to serve as a cargo ship in a non-commissioned status with a civil service crew with the Military Sealift Command, being designated the United States Naval Ship USNS Tioga County (T-LST-1158). This service continued until she was stricken from the Navy List on 1 November 1973.

== Disposal ==
After her Military Sealift Command service ended, Tioga County was transferred to the Maritime Administration for layup in the National Defense Reserve Fleet at Suisun Bay, Benicia, California. Custody of Tioga County was transferred to the Maritime Administration on 17 December 1992. She was sold for scrapping to ESCO Marine of Brownsville, Texas on 21 July 2005. She was returned to U.S. Navy custody, removed from the National Defense Reserve Fleet Suisun Bay Group by towing on 17 August 2005 and subsequently scrapped.

== See also ==
- List of United States Navy LSTs
