= USS Wahkiakum County =

US naval vessel (1953–1970)

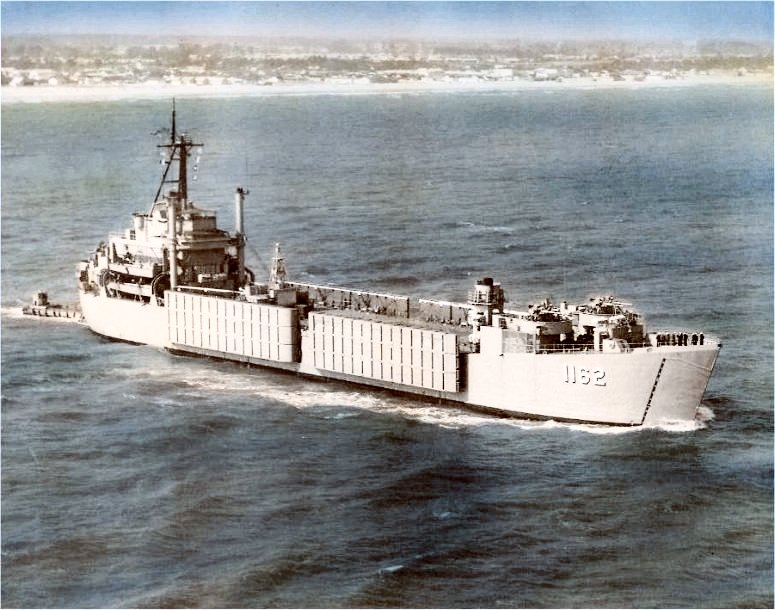
- USS Wahkiakum County (LST-1162)

History

United States
- Name: USS Wahkiakum County
- Namesake: Wahkiakum County in Washington
- Builder: Ingalls Shipbuilding Corporation, Pascagoula, Mississippi
- Laid down: 21 July 1952
- Launched: 23 January 1953
- Commissioned: 13 August 1953
- Decommissioned: 16 October 1970
- In service: with Military Sealift Command in non-commissioned service from 10 April 1972 to 11 January 1973 or 11 November 1973
- Renamed: USS Wahkiakum County 1 July 1955 (previously USS LST-1162); Became USNS Wahkiakum County 10 April 1972
- Reclassified: T-LST-1162 10 April 1972
- Stricken: 11 January 1973 or 11 November 1973
- Fate: Laid up 1973; Transferred to Maritime Administration for lay-up in National Defense Reserve Fleet 29 July 1992; Sold for scrapping 22 June 2005
- Notes: In commissioned service as USS LST-1162 1953-1955 and as USS Wahkiakum County (LST-1162) 1955-1970; in non-commissioned service with Military Sealift Command as USNS Wahkiakum County (T-LST-1162) 1972-1973

General characteristics
- Class & type: LST-1156-(Terrebonne Parish-) class landing ship tank
- Displacement: 2,590 tons (light); 5,800 tons (full)
- Length: 384 ft (117 m)
- Beam: 55 ft (17 m)
- Draft: 17 ft (5.2 m)
- Installed power: 6,000 shp (4.48 MW)
- Propulsion: Four General Motors 16-278A diesel engines, two controllable-pitch propellers
- Speed: 14 knots
- Boats & landing craft carried: 3 x landing craft, vehicle, personnel LCVPs, 1 x landing craft personnel (large) LCPL
- Troops: 395 (15 officers, 380 enlisted men)
- Complement: 205 (16 officers, 189 enlisted men)
- Armor: 3 × twin 3 in (76 mm) dual-purpose gun mounts; 5 × single 20 mm antiaircraft gun mounts

USS Wahkiakum County (LST-1162), previously USS LST-1162, was a United States Navy landing ship tank (LST) in commission from 1953 to 1970, and which then saw non-commissioned Military Sealift Command service as USNS Wahkiakum County (T-LST-1162) from 1972 to 1973.

== Construction and commissioning ==
Wahkiakum County was laid down as USS LST-1162 on 21 July 1952 at Pascagoula, Mississippi by the Ingalls Shipbuilding Corporation. She was launched on 23 January 1953, sponsored by Mrs. Wilbur G. Dees, and commissioned on 13 August 1953.

== Atlantic and Caribbean operations, 1953-1960 ==
Following shakedown in Guantanamo Bay, Cuba, LST-1162 operated out of the United States Atlantic Fleet's Naval Amphibious Base Little Creek, Virginia Beach, Virginia, for the remainder of 1953, conducting local operations out of Little Creek and off the coast of Florida. In 1954, LST-1162 participated in Atlantic Fleet amphibious maneuvers "NprAmEx" and "LantFlex" and conducted operations with the Operational Development Force out of Key West, Florida, testing antisubmarine warfare gear. Later during 1954, LST-1162 visited Havana, Cuba, with embarked naval reservists. During March 1955, LST-1162 operated off Bloodsworth Island, conducting gunfire tests and serving as range safety vessel at the Navy's gunnery practice areas there.

On 1 July 1955, USS LST-1162 was named USS Wahkiakum County (LST-1162). For the next five years, Wahkiakum County pursued a regular schedule of operations off the United States East Coast and into the Caribbean and Gulf of Mexico. She was deployed in the Mediterranean Sea in 1958 and 1959, both from January through June. Operating with the Atlantic Fleet's amphibious force, she served alternatively as a helicopter carrier -— a harbinger of the roles which other ships of her type would perform during the Vietnam War; a shore bombardment safety vessel; an afloat gunnery training ship; and a transport for Navy construction battalions (CB's or "Seabees") and their equipment.

== Atlantic, Caribbean, and Mediterranean operations, 1960-1965 ==
At the end of this period, she deployed to the Mediterranean Sea and operated with the 6th Fleet from May to December 1960. She carried cargo and troops and participated in amphibious exercises with naval units of North Atlantic Treaty Organization (NATO) countries in the Mediterranean.

Wahkiakum County underwent a major overhaul at Newport News, Virginia, in 1961, before she resumed active operations with a three-month Caribbean deployment.

Transferred to Amphibious Squadron (PhibRon) 12 on 1 July 1961, Wahkiakum County participated in several amphibious landing exercises and contingency operations over the remainder of the year. During July and September 1961, she transported United States Naval Academy midshipmen from Annapolis, Maryland, to Little Creek, Virginia, for annual summer training and began a three-month Caribbean deployment in September 1961.

During the Cuban Missile Crisis in the autumn of 1962, Wahkiakum County embarked the 2nd Battalion, 8th Marine Regiment, and operated in support of the blockade of Cuba from 24 October 1962 to 7 December 1962. She deployed to the Mediterranean in the spring of 1963, operating with the 6th Fleet Amphibious Task Force, and again to the Caribbean during the spring of 1964.

== Intervention in the Dominican Republic, 1965 ==
On 24 April 1965, supporters of the ousted Dominican Republic President Juan Bosch launched a coup d'etat in Santo Domingo, which soon degenerated into a civil war, with loyalists battling a rebel group backed by armed civilians. As the fighting threatened Americans there, the United States sent U.S. Marines to protect and evacuate Americans. When it appeared that the revolt had been taken over by Fidel Castro's Cubans, the United States intervened with more men —- paratroops of the 82nd Airborne Division and Marines. During the period from 9 May 1965 to 17 May 1965, Wahkiakum County operated in support of this evacuation and intervention operation.

== Mediterranean and Caribbean operations, 1965-1970 ==
For the remainder of the 1960s and into 1970, Wahkiakum County operated on regular deployments to the Caribbean and Mediterranean.

== Decommissioning and disposal ==
Decommissioned at the Inactive Ship Facility, Orange, Texas, on 16 October 1970, Wahkiakum County was transferred to the Military Sealift Command (MSC) at Brooklyn, New York on 10 April 1972. Reclassified as a United States Naval Ship (USNS) -- indicating non-commissioned U.S. Navy service with a largely civilian crew—and as T-LST-1162, the now-USNS Wahkiakum County operated with MSC as a cargo ship until struck from the Navy List in 1973; sources disagree on the date on which she was struck, claiming it was either on 11 January 1973 or on 11 November 1973. She was then laid up.

Wahkiakum County was transferred to the Maritime Administration on 29 July 1992, for lay up in the National Defense Reserve Fleet, Suisun Bay, Benicia, California. She was sold for scrapping on 22 June 2005 to ESCO Marine, Brownsville, Texas, and removed from the Suisun Bay National Defense Reserve Fleet on 24 August 2005. She was subsequently scrapped.

== See also ==
- List of United States Navy LSTs
