= USS Westchester County =

US Navy tank landing ship built in 1952

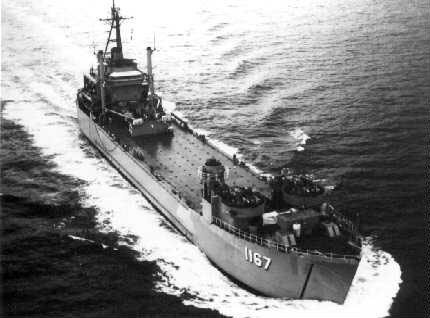
- USS Westchester County underway, c. 1960

History

United States
- Name: USS LST-1167, USS Westchester County (LST-1167) from 1 July 1954
- Namesake: Westchester County, New York
- Builder: Christy Corporation, Sturgeon Bay, Wisconsin
- Laid down: 11 January 1952
- Launched: 18 April 1953
- Commissioned: 10 March 1954
- Decommissioned: 30 August 1973
- Honours and awards: three Navy Unit Commendations, two Meritorious Unit Commendations, and 14 campaign stars for Vietnam War service.

Turkey
- Name: Serdar
- Acquired: 27 August 1974
- Stricken: 2005
- Identification: L-402
- Fate: Sunk as a target on 30 May 2014.

General characteristics
- Class & type: Terrebonne Parish-class tank landing ship
- Displacement: 2,590 tons (light); 5,800 tons (full)
- Length: 384 ft 0 in (117.0 m)
- Beam: 55 ft 0 in (16.8 m)
- Draft: 17 ft 0 in (5.2 m)
- Propulsion: Four General Motors 16-278A diesel engines, two controllable pitch propellers
- Speed: 14 knots (26 km/h)
- Boats & landing craft carried: 3 × LCVPs; 1 × LCPL
- Troops: 15 officers and 380 enlisted
- Complement: 16 officers and 189 enlisted
- Armament: 3 × twin 3 in (76 mm)/50 gun mounts; 5 × single .50 cal (12.7 mm) gun mounts

USS Westchester County (LST-1167) was a Terrebonne Parish-class tank landing ship built for the United States Navy at the tail end of the Korean War. Named for Westchester County, New York, she was the only U.S. Naval vessel to bear the name. The ship served in the Vietnam War and was damaged by limpet mines set by Viet Cong frogmen. It was repaired and later sold to the Turkish Navy and finally sunk as a target in 2014.

== 1950s ==
Designed under project SCB 9A and laid down as LST-1167 on 11 January 1952 by the Christy Corporation of Sturgeon Bay, Wisconsin; launched on 18 April 1953; sponsored by Mrs. Robert E. Wood; and commissioned on 10 March 1954. The tank landing ship departed New Orleans on 8 April 1954 and reached the Naval Amphibious Base at Little Creek, Virginia on 14 April. The remainder of the year was spent in amphibious warfare exercises in the Chesapeake Bay. On 14 February 1955 LST-1167 sailed from Little Creek to embark 205 marines and equipment for exercises in the Caribbean. These exercises were repeated in April, and the ship returned to Little Creek on 6 May 1955.

On 1 July, LST-1167 was renamed USS Westchester County. Westchester County spent the remaining months of 1955 engaged in operations along the east coast with the majority of the time being spent in local training. After loading marines and equipment at Morehead City, North Carolina the tank landing ship sailed for exercises in the Caribbean on 11 January 1956. She returned to Norfolk, Virginia on 6 February and made another training cruise to the Caribbean from 20 February to 24 March. Upon returning to Little Creek the ship conducted local operations until the Fourth of July which she spent at Yonkers, New York. She visited Trenton, New Jersey and Washington, D.C., then went into overhaul on 21 September at the Brewer Dry Dock Company of Staten Island, New York. After a two-month yard period, the ship conducted local operations to finish out the year.

On 28 February 1957 Westchester County embarked personnel and equipment at Morehead City and sailed to the Caribbean for amphibious training exercises, returning to Norfolk on 13 May. She conducted local operations until 28 August when she sailed for a Mediterranean deployment, joining the 6th Fleet at Messina, Sicily on 15 September. The ship conducted exercises off Turkey, Greece, and Spain. On 4 November the ship departed Alicante, Spain for Little Creek, where she spent the remainder of the year in local operations. Westchester County began the year 1958 departing Norfolk for San Francisco via the Panama Canal. She arrived at the San Francisco Naval Shipyard on 31 January for overhaul which was completed on 2 April. The ship put to sea from San Diego on 7 June for her first tour of duty in the Far East. She reached Sasebo, Japan on 5 July for amphibious warfare maneuvers and assault landing practice in Buckner Bay, Okinawa; Subic Bay, Philippines; and Tsoying, Taiwan where she engaged in joint operations with Chinese Underwater Demolition Teams embarked. She returned to San Diego on 10 December 1958 and there finished the year. The first eight months of 1959 were spent in amphibious training along the California coast. On 24 August Westchester County embarked marines and vehicles for Kaneohe, Hawaii and amphibious landings. On 6 October she returned to California, off-loaded the marines and returned to San Francisco. On 30 November Westchester County entered the Todd Shipyard, Alameda, California for overhaul until 12 February 1960.

== 1960s ==
She resumed her training schedule out of San Diego until 1 August 1960 when she shifted to Port Hueneme to load cargo and take on fuel. The next day, she set course for her new home port of Yokosuka, Japan via the Hawaiian Islands and Okinawa. The ship beached at Numazu, Japan on 5 September 1960 to commence a series of large scale amphibious exercises with SEATO forces. From 1 to 31 December, Westchester County underwent overhaul at the Yokosuka Naval Base. The year 1961 was spent making logistic runs between Subic Bay, Okinawa, and North Borneo. Westchester County spent November and December. 1961 in upkeep at her home port. Westchester County got underway on 18 January 1962 for sea trials and refresher training. On 10 March she rendezvoused with other units of the Pacific Fleet and departed for Mindoro, Philippines for amphibious warfare maneuvers. The ship returned to Yokosuka on 20 April and resumed a normal training schedule. The communist threat in Vietnam interrupted this training period and, on 13 May, Westchester County was underway for Subic Bay with a combat load of marines.

On 15 June 1962 the tank landing ship returned to Yokosuka for upkeep and in-port training. She then conducted operations at Keelung, Taiwan; Subic Bay; Bangkok, Thailand; and Naha, Okinawa. During October, the ship participated in amphibious "Exercise Lone Eagle." This exercise was delayed in Okinawa due to the Cuban Missile Crisis, which put United States ships on a worldwide alert. On 12 November Westchester County returned to her home port of Yokosuka, where she spent Christmas. On 28 December 1962 she departed for a New Year's visit to Tokyo, Japan. The year 1963 began with a cold weather operation in Korea which commenced on 16 January. Westchester County spent the time until 24 May shuttling marine personnel and equipment to Naha, Tsoying, and Numazu, Japan with interspersed upkeep periods at Yokosuka. On 24 May she sailed from Naha to transport Korean soldiers from Pusan to Pohang, Korea. After a brief upkeep at Sasebo, Japan Westchester County took part in "Operation Flagpole", a joint amphibious exercise with the Republic of Korea Navy and Marines which concluded on 29 June. July and August were spent in upkeep at Yokosuka, followed by "Exercise Bayonet Beach" on 5 September at Tong Po Pi, Korea. Westchester County returned to Yokosuka on 19 September for inspections and amphibious training. On 7 October the ship sailed for Okinawa where she sustained damage to her bow ramp which required repairs at Sasebo until 29 October. After a brief Marine lift to Okinawa, Westchester County returned to Yokosuka on 9 November for regular overhaul. The ship went into drydock on 27 December 1963 and thus ended the year.

Westchester County remained in drydock until 31 January 1964 and underwent sea trials, refresher training, and amphibious refresher training at Yokosuka until 8 May. She departed Yokosuka on 19 May for Naha, and the first of many Marine lifts between Okinawa, Japan, and the Philippines which occupied the ship until 9 August. At that time, due to the Tonkin Gulf Incident, Westchester County departed Naha for extended operations off Vietnam in the South China Sea. She returned to Subic Bay on 2 October and began a series of Marine lifts between Naha and Buckner Bay, Tsoying, and Yokosuka. On 19 November the ship returned to Yokosuka and underwent upkeep and underway training until 24 December when she visited Tokyo. Westchester County departed Tokyo on 28 December 1964 and returned to Yokosuka. Westchester County started 1965 with two Marine lifts between Okinawa and Japan. February was spent at Okinawa; and, on 3 March, the ship transported marines and vehicles to Subic Bay. Between 17 March and 15 April the tank landing ship completed two Marine lifts to Da Nang, South Vietnam. On 29 April she departed Buckner Bay for the first amphibious landing at Chu Lai, South Vietnam. This operation was the largest in the Pacific since the Korean War. From 11 to 24 May, the ship made two turnaround trips between Naha, Okinawa, and Chu Lai. Following upkeep at Yokosuka, Westchester County spent the period from 22 June to 15 August making Marine lifts to Da Nang and Chu Lai. She returned to Yokosuka for upkeep until 30 September when she transported marines from Naha to Numazu for cold weather operations.

== Vietnam War service ==
After reloading at Yokosuka, Westchester County transported Korean troops from Pusan, Korea to Qui Nhơn, South Vietnam. From 7 to 21 November she joined in "Operation Blue Marlin", making two landings at Tam Kỳ, South Vietnam. These landings were followed by stops at Cam Ranh Bay, Phan Rang, and Da Nang. She arrived at Yokosuka on 16 December and spent Christmas at her home port. On 26 December she put to sea to load cargo at Iwakuni, arriving on the 28th and departing for Naha the next day. On 31 December 1965 she arrived at Naha and there celebrated the New Year.

During 1966 Westchester County served extensively in carrying cargo to the Republic of Vietnam in support of American forces ashore. On 24 January the ship joined in "Operation Double Eagle", an amphibious assault at Cap Mai, Vietnam. From February throughout August, Westchester County transported troops and equipment to Qui Nhơn, Chu Lai, and Da Nang. This duty was interspersed with port visits to Hong Kong and repairs at Subic Bay and Yokosuka. On 1 September 1966 Westchester County anchored at Vũng Tàu, Vietnam to begin operations as the support ship for "Operation Market Time". Until 4 October the ship steamed continuously on station off the Cà Mau Peninsula; refueling, replenishing, and serving as a base for the boats and crews who patrolled the coast of Vietnam to prevent infiltration by sea. After returning to Yokosuka, the ship spent the period from 16 October through 31 December undergoing upkeep interspersed with a short training visit to Okinawa and port visits to Keelung, Taiwan and Hiroshima, Japan. From 3 January to 15 March 1967 Westchester County transported troops and supplies between Okinawa and Vietnam. The ship went into overhaul on 15 March at Yokosuka, followed by refresher training which lasted through 5 August. Westchester County spent the remaining months of 1967 carrying Marines and equipment between Yokosuka, Okinawa, and Vietnam. The LST served as a Mobile Riverine Force support ship in the Mekong Delta from 24 October through 31 December 1967.

Westchester County spent the early weeks of 1968 continuing service as a Mobile Riverine support ship. On 26 January the ship began a series of lifts from Okinawa and the Philippines to Vietnam. She underwent repair availability and training exercises from 16 July through 22 September. The ship resumed duty with the Mobile Riverine Forces on 22 September. On 1 November while Westchester County lay anchored in the vicinity of Mỹ Tho, Vietnam two giant underwater explosions ripped through it, killing 26 men. Viet Cong divers had attached limpet mines to the hull about amidships on the starboard side causing ruptured berthing compartments and fuel and storage tanks. Command-detonated mines were used extensively on "The Long Tau" (Saigon—Vũng Tàu). U.S. minesweepers normally operated between Nha Be south to the ocean, and South Vietnamese operated from Nha Be to Newport. The day following the explosion, the entire Mobile Riverine Force moved from Mỹ Tho to Đồng Tâm. After beaching at Đồng Tâm for temporary repairs, she returned to Yokosuka, via Subic Bay, on 26 November. Westchester County went into drydock at the United States Naval Ship Repair Facility where it remained until 5 February 1969. Upon completion of refresher training and upkeep, the ship got underway on 10 March 1969 for "Operation Market Time" off the Vietnam coast. From 5 July through 23 August, Westchester County joined in the first phase of Vietnam troop withdrawal. The remainder of 1969 was spent carrying personnel and equipment from Korea, Japan, and Okinawa to Vietnam with intermittent periods of repair and liberty. The beginning of the 1970s found Westchester County operating off the northern coast of Vietnam. During February, she conducted troop and equipment withdrawal from South Vietnam, then underwent restricted availability at Yokosuka beginning on 4 March. April through July were spent transporting personnel and cargo from Japan and Okinawa to Vietnam. On 2 August she relieved the Washoe County off the Cà Mau Peninsula for "Operation Solid Anchor", which consisted of fueling boats and helicopters. Nine of Westchester County's sailors received the Combat Action Ribbon when they withstood enemy small arms and rocket fire while transiting the Bo De River.

Following a restricted availability at Yokosuka which commenced on 30 October, Westchester County made stops at Camranh Bay, Da Nang, Hong Kong, Okinawa, and Iwakuni before departing on 17 November for a vehicle lift from Chinhae, South Korea to Okinawa. Westchester County spent the first half of December involved in landing rehearsals and gunnery exercises. She then transited to Singapore to enjoy a Christmas visit. The ship closed out the year en route to Subic Bay. During January 1971 Westchester County sailed between Hong Kong and Subic Bay. On 2 February she departed Subic Bay en route to the Gulf of Tonkin in support of "Operation Lamson III", a Cambodian operation which lasted until 7 March. After restricted availability and training at Okinawa and Yokosuka, the ship returned to Vietnam on 21 June and continued operations. From 6 August through 1 September, Westchester County assumed the administrative duties as SOPA (senior officer present afloat) in Hong Kong. Following restricted availability at Yokosuka, the ship lifted personnel and equipment of a US Army security agency for transit to Pusan, and returned them to Okinawa on 6 December. During this period, she transported Marines from Japan to Okinawa, departing Okinawa on 24 November to spend Thanksgiving at Yokosuka. Following the off-load of Army personnel on 6 December, Westchester County returned to Yokosuka for the holiday season, arriving on 10 December. Westchester County completed a restricted availability on 17 January 1972 and set out for a lift to Subic Bay. The ship spent February at Subic Bay undergoing repairs and local operations. After SOPA duties at Hong Kong from 15 to 31 March, the ship resumed personnel and cargo transits to the Gulf of Tonkin until 30 August 1972. During this period, the ship underwent a seven-week restricted availability followed by refresher training at Yokosuka.

== Post Vietnam War and transfer to Turkish Navy ==
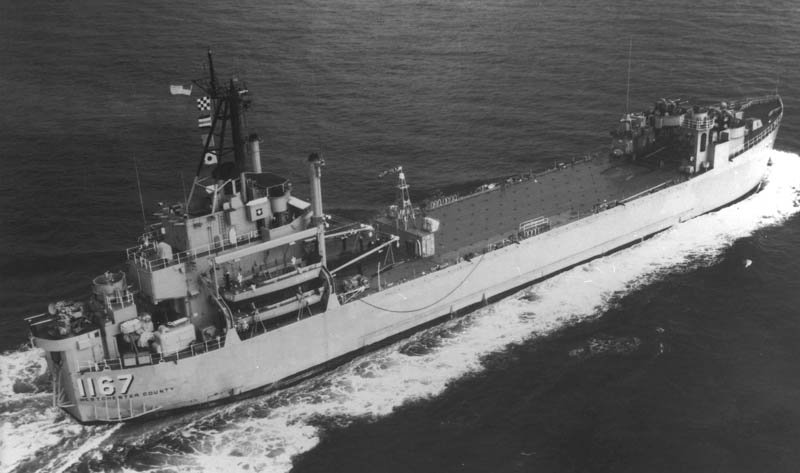
USS Westchester County underway, date and location unknown

From 7 September through 1 October 1972 Westchester County operated in logistic support of Mine Flotilla 1. She returned to Yokosuka on 15 October for availability and inspection. The ship made a brief transit to Okinawa, departing on 30 November. She returned to Yokosuka on 5 December 1972 and enjoyed the Christmas holidays while in upkeep status. On 27 January 1973, following the signing of the Paris Peace Accords, the ship was underway for Subic Bay to transport mine counter-measures equipment and Commander, Mine Flotilla One to the Gulf of Tonkin. Due to a breakdown in the cease-fire negotiations, the tank landing ship was ordered to a rendezvous point near Da Nang. Departing the vicinity on 3 March, she continued to work in support of "Operation End Sweep". After availability and shore bombardment exercises at Subic Bay which commenced on 14 March, Westchester County returned to Vietnam in support of "Operation End Sweep" which was completed on 18 July. The ship made stops at Subic Bay and Okinawa before finally arriving at Yokosuka on 30 July. Westchester County was decommissioned on 30 August 1973 and arrived at the Inactive Ship Facility, Puget Sound Naval Shipyard, Bremerton, Washington on 30 November of that year. On 27 August 1974 she was turned over to the Turkish Navy and commissioned as Serdar (L-402). Decommissioned by the Turkish Navy in 2011 and sunk as a target on 30 May 2014.

== See also ==
- List of United States Navy LSTs
