= USS Washoe County =

United States Navy landing ship tank

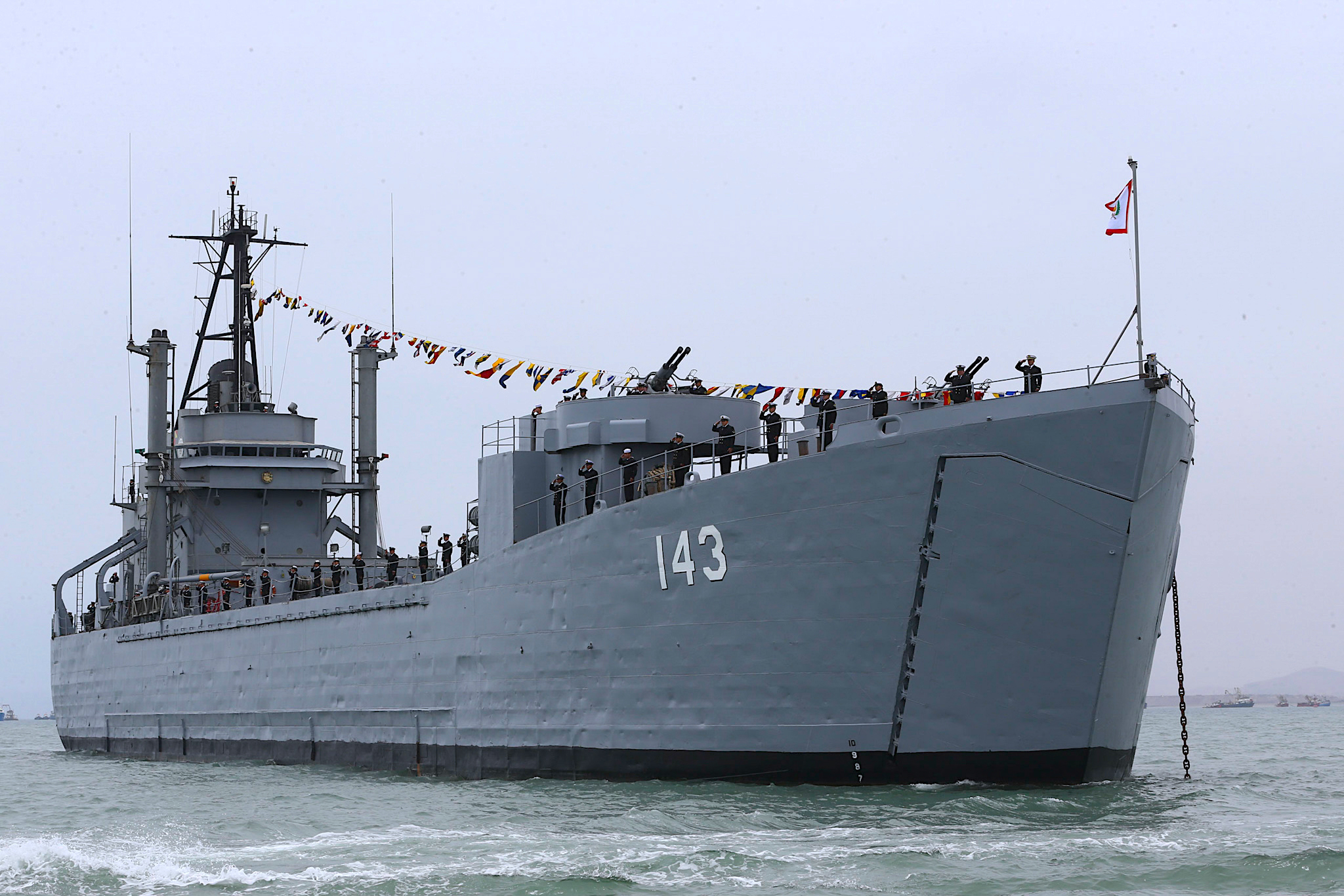
- BAP Callao (DT-143)

History

United States
- Name: USS Washoe County
- Namesake: Washoe County in Nevada
- Builder: Ingalls Shipbuilding Corporation in Pascagoula, Mississippi
- Laid down: 1 December 1952
- Launched: 14 July 1953
- Commissioned: 30 November 1953
- Decommissioned: 25 March 1971
- In service: with Military Sealift Command in non-commissioned service from January 1973 until 1 November 1973
- Renamed: USS Washoe County 1 July 1955 (formerly USS LST-1165); Became USNS Washoe County January 1973
- Reclassified: T-LST-1165 January 1973
- Stricken: 1 November 1973
- Honors and awards: A Presidential Unit Citation, a Navy Unit Commendation, a Meritorious Unit Commendation, and 12 campaign stars for Vietnam War service
- Fate: Laid up in the National Defense Reserve Fleet 1973; Leased to Peru 7 August 1984; Sold to Peru 26 April 1999; Sunk as target 30 September 2021 in UNITAS Exercises.
- Notes: In commission service as USS LST-1165 1953-1955 and as USS Washoe County (LST-1165) 1955-1971; in non-commissioned service with Military Sealift Command as USNS Washoe County (T-LST-1165) 1973

General characteristics
- Class & type: LST-1156-(Terrebonne Parish-) class landing ship tank
- Displacement: 2,590 tons (light); 5,800 tons (full)
- Length: 384 ft (117 m)
- Beam: 55 ft (17 m)
- Draft: 17 ft (5.2 m)
- Installed power: 6,000 shp (4.48 MW)
- Propulsion: Four General Motors 16-278A diesel engines, two controllable-pitch propellers
- Speed: 14 knots
- Boats & landing craft carried: 3 x landing craft, vehicle, personnel LCVPs, 1 x landing craft personnel (large) LCPL
- Troops: 395 (15 officers, 380 enlisted men)
- Complement: 205 (16 officers, 189 enlisted men)
- Armor: 3 × twin 3 in (76 mm) dual-purpose gun mounts; 5 × single 20 mm antiaircraft gun mounts

USS Washoe County (LST-1165), previously USS LST-1165, was a United States Navy landing ship tank (LST) in commission from 1953 to 1971, and which then saw non-commissioned Military Sealift Command service as USNS Washoe County (T-LST-1165) in 1973.

== Construction and commissioning ==
USS LST-1165 was designed under project SCB 9A and laid down on 1 December 1952 at Pascagoula, Mississippi, by the Ingalls Shipbuilding Corporation. She was launched on 14 July 1953, sponsored by Mrs. Ralph K. James, and commissioned on 30 November 1953.

== Atlantic, Caribbean, and Mediterranean service ==
In January 1954, LST-1165 joined the United States Atlantic Fleet and became part of the Atlantic Amphibious Force. After completing training in the vicinity of Hampton Roads, Virginia, in early spring 1954, LST-1165 became very active in United States Naval Reserve training and made cruises to Miami, Florida; Boston, Massachusetts; New York City; and Havana, Cuba.

During 1955, LST--1165 participated in many Atlantic Fleet exercises which took her from Labrador to the Caribbean. She also took part in the filming of the motion picture "Away All Boats" at Vieques Island, Puerto Rico. On 1 July 1955, USS LST-1165 was renamed USS Washoe County (LST-1165). On 5 November 1955, the ship arrived at Naval Amphibious Base Little Creek, Virginia Beach, Virginia, where she spent the remainder of 1955.

Washoe County completed underway preparations at Little Creek on 20 February 1956 and, after a brief stop at Morehead City, North Carolina, sailed on 25 February 1956 for refresher training at Guantanamo Bay, Cuba. She conducted exercises in the Caribbean until 29 April 1956, when she returned to Miami, Florida. For the next few months, Washoe County worked along the United States East Coast taking part in various operations.

Washoe County departed Norfolk, Virginia, on 27 August 1956 and headed for the Mediterranean and her first tour with the United States Sixth Fleet. She also visited ports in Spain, Morocco, France, and Tunisia before returning to Hampton Roads on 5 February 1957.

The next three months of 1957 found Washoe County operating in the Norfolk area. On 28 March 1957, she headed for the Caribbean and operations at Barbados, St. Thomas, and Puerto Rico. She returned to Morehead City on 14 April 1957 and spent the remainder of 1957 in local operations in the Chesapeake Bay area.

== Western Pacific service ==
Washoe County departed Little Creek on 6 January 1958, stopped briefly at Guantanamo Bay, Cuba, then transited the Panama Canal and arrived at San Diego, California, on 27 January 1958. She remained there for the next five months. On 10 June 1958, she began supply runs to Seal Beach, Port Hueneme, and San Nicolas Island, California.

Washoe County returned to San Diego on 26 June 1958 for a month's rest before sailing for Pearl Harbor, Hawaii, on 23 July 1958. The ship returned to San Diego on 20 August 1958 and spent the rest of 1958 in operations off the California coast.

During the early months of 1959, Washoe County was at San Diego preparing for an upcoming Western Pacific (WestPac) deployment. She set course for Japan on 15 April 1959 and arrived at Sasebo, Japan, on 7 May 1959. Except for a visit to Hong Kong during June 1959, Washoe County operated between Okinawa and Japan into the autumn of 1959. She returned to San Diego on 26 November 1959 and conducted local operations in waters off the California coast through the end of the year.

During the first half of 1960, Washoe County conducted various operations along the United States West Coast, including Operation Swan Dive off Cape Pendleton; Operation Bay Island off Tacoma, Washington, with the United States Army and United States Air Force; and Operation Shark Bite at San Francisco, California, with United States Marine Corps reservists.

On 1 July 1960, Washoe County's home port was changed to Yokosuka, Japan. One month later, she sailed for the Western Pacific; she stopped at Pearl Harbor, then arrived at Iwakuni, Japan, on 3 September 1960. She spent September and October 1960 carrying United States Marine Corps troops and vehicles with stops in Naha and Buckner Bay, Okinawa, and Numazu, Japan. Washoe County completed a restricted availability on 17 October 1960 and, after a visit to Hong Kong, took part in Operation Packboard off Okinawa from 11 November 1960 to 19 November 1960. On 7 December 1960, she commenced an overhaul at Yokosuka which lasted into 1957.

Washoe County finished her yard work on 8 February 1961 and began training. She then made a visit to Tokyo and remained there until 22 March 1961. The months of April and May were occupied with operations off Vietnam in the South China Sea, and she returned to Japan late in the spring for local operations. From 2 August 1961 to 14 August 1961, Washoe County participated in Operation Sharp Edge off Korea. The ship ended 1961 by taking part in Operation Fiesta at San Jose, Mindoro, Philippines, commemorating the 17th anniversary of the landing of United States forces in the Philippine Islands in World War II.

On 17 February 1962, Washoe County began her participation in the large-scale Southeast Asia Treaty Organization (SEATO) Exercise Tulungan in the Philippine area which lasted through 20 April 1962. She then devoted the remainder of 1962 to visiting the ports of Keelung, Taiwan; Subic Bay, the Philippines; Hong Kong; and Beppu and Kyūshū, Japan. During July and August 1962, she joined in Operation Seven Seas off Korea. On 8 December 1962, she entered the shipyard at Yokosuka for an overhaul.

She devoted the major portion of 1963 to routine operations and training and from 12 June 1963 to 30 June 1963 participated in her only operation of the year, Operation Flagpole. On 30 September 1963, Washoe County rescued 15 men from the foundering Japanese fishing vessel, Shoyo Maru No. 10, near Miyako Jima.

The year 1964 began with Washoe County moored at Yokohama. From 3 January 1964 to 27 January 1964, she underwent upkeep at Yokosuka. An administrative inspection of the ship held on 3 February 1964 was followed by preparations for the upcoming Exercise Back Pack which she conducted from 26 February 1964 to 16 March 1964.

Washoe County lifted ammunition from Sasebo to Numazu, Japan, from 10 April 1964 to 17 April 1964. The ship participated in Operation Ligtas from 29 May 1964 to 8 June 1964, then sailed to Hong Kong for a port visit. She spent July 1964 undergoing another physical security inspection plus sea trials.

== Vietnam War service ==
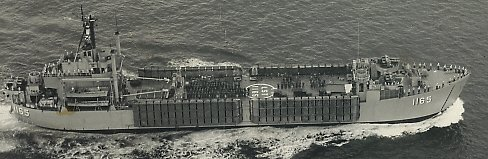
USS Washoe County

During August and September 1964, Washoe County conducted special operations in the South China Sea off the coast of Vietnam. Following routine operations and training, Washoe County visited Beppu, Japan, from 2 December 1964 to 4 December 1964 and, after a force medical inspection and an operational readiness inspection, spent the rest of 1964 at Yokohama.

Washoe County spent the first three-quarters of 1965 making shuttle trips between Okinawa, Japan, and Vietnam in support of American forces in Vietnam. The loads she carried during the year included Marine Corps, Naval Beach Group, Naval Beach Jumper, and Amphibious Construction Battalion equipment and personnel. Most of the year's last quarter was devoted to a yard overhaul at Yokosuka which began on 16 September 1965 and ended on 10 December 1965. On 27 December 1965, the ship commenced refresher training which continued into 1966.

The ship departed Yokosuka loaded with pontoon barge sections destined for Danang, South Vietnam. Following a short stop in Okinawa, the ship arrived at Danang on 22 February 1966. She then proceeded to Chu Lai and discharged the remainder of the cargo.

After hauling cargo to Danang, Chu Lai, Camranh Bay, and Phan Rang, Washoe County joined with an amphibious ready group whose mission was to conduct an amphibious raid, Operation Jackstay against Viet Cong southeast of Saigon. She served in a pioneering role as an advance base providing gunfire support, arms, ammunition, rations, and water to assault boat groups.

Washoe County returned to Yokosuka on 28 May 1966 for a brief period of repairs and rehabilitation. On 18 June 1966, the ship sailed for Okinawa to reload supplies, then made a visit to Hong Kong before resuming her duties as a cargo carrier along the Vietnamese coast.

In mid-August, she steamed through the Inland Sea of Japan and Shimonoseki Strait on her way to Korea. After a week of training with the Republic of Korea Navy, Washoe County returned to Iwakuni, Japan, and embarked Marines and cargo. Before returning to Yokosuka at the end of October 1966, the ship made two more lifts to Vietnam, carrying cargo to Chu Lai and Qui Nhon and returning equipment from Danang to Naha, Okinawa.

The year 1967 began with Washoe County in the port of Naha, Okinawa, loading cargo. She spent the month of January engaged in shuttle runs carrying cargo and personnel along the South Vietnamese coast and Okinawa and then enjoyed a rest and recreation visit to Hong Kong. The ship spent most of February 1967 conducting intracoastal logistic support lifts along the South Vietnam coast. On 20 February 1967, Washoe County participated in Operation De Soto, in which material was offloaded by Marine helicopters operating off the ship's main deck. The operation was concluded on 8 March 1967, and the tank landing ship underwent an upkeep period lasting from 20 March 1967 to 11 April 1967.

From 15 April 1967 to 2 June 1967, Washoe County made shuttle runs with cargo and troops to Chi Lung, Taiwan; Danang and Chu Lai, South Vietnam; Naha, Okinawa; Yokosuka, Japan; and Inchon, South Korea. The ship then returned to Yokosuka for upkeep from 7 June 1967 to 22 June 1967, during which time Washoe County became the flagship for Landing Squadron 9.

The crew enjoyed liberty at Hong Kong from 11 July 1967 to 16 July 1967; then debarked the commodore and his staff at Buckner Bay, Okinawa, and took Army personnel to Pusan, Korea, before returning to Yokosuka on 3 August 1967 for upkeep which was completed on 7 September 1967. In mid-September, the ship arrived at Danang and participated in three major Operation Fortress Sentry, Operation Formation Leader, and Operation Badger Hunt, from 14 September 1967 to 2 December 1967.

Washoe County retired to Subic Bay on 5 December 1967 and soon sailed to Okinawa for training exercises with Marines. She returned to Yokosuka on 18 December 1967 for upkeep which lasted into 1968.

On 1 March 1968, Washoe County sailed for Danang, South Vietnam, in company with USS Terrell County (LST-1157) and USS Westchester County (LST-1167), carrying causeway sections to be used at Wunder Beach, South Vietnam. The sections were splashed and moved into place on 17 March 1968. While engaged in the causeway installation, Washoe County's port shaft was damaged; and she underwent repairs at Subic Bay from 21 March 1968 to 25 March 1968. She then returned to Vietnam, but further problems with the port shaft developed, necessitating more extensive repairs at Subic Bay which lasted until 29 April 1968. The ship then successfully completed sea trials and got underway for Japan and arrived at Yokosuka on 5 May 1968.

Washoe County underwent upkeep at Yokosuka which was not finished until early June 1968. On 3 June 1968, she began loading Marine equipment at Naha, and she delivered it at Subic Bay on 8 June 1968. Following a visit to Hong Kong from 14 June 1968 to 19 June 1968, she headed for South Vietnam. En route on 20 June 1968, Washoe County embarked two injured personnel from the American freighter SS John C. after that ship had run aground on the north reef of the Paracel Islands.

The next day, Washoe County returned to Danang and resumed duties with the amphibious ready group. With the exception of upkeep from 10 July 1968 to 20 July 1968, the ship served in the combat zone continuously through July and much of August. On 24 August 1968, Washoe County headed for her home port and arrived at Yokosuka on 12 September 1968.

Washoe County began her last deployment of 1968 off the coast of South Vietnam at the Ca Mau Peninsula for Operation Market Time, sealing off the coastline of South Vietnam and adjacent waterways from communist infiltration. From 27 October 1968 to 9 December 1968, she functioned as an emergency helicopter landing pad in evacuating eight U.S. Navy and United States Coast Guard personnel wounded in action and the body of one Coast Guardsman who had been killed in action ashore. She also dispensed fuel, food, water, and ammunition to 134 patrol boats and fired 42 naval gunfire support missions.

Washoe County arrived back at Yokosuka on 19 December 1968 and spent the end of 1968 there.

Washoe County began 1969 preparing for the cyclical yard overhaul period which commenced on 19 January 1969 and continued through 10 April 1969. From 20 April 1969 to 6 June 1969, she conducted refresher training and amphibious refresher training. On 12 June 1969, Washoe County got underway for the first deployment of the year as a support ship for Operation Seafloat/Tran Hung Dao III in the Ca Mau Peninsula of South Vietnam. Seafloat was a floating advanced tactical support base primarily for psychological warfare missions conducted in the Cua Lon River at the southernmost tip of South Vietnam. During this period, Washoe County served as a helicopter platform and provided logistics and communications support.

On 10 August 1969, after 46 days on station, Washoe County sailed via Subic Bay to Hong Kong for a two-week assignment as station ship. She got underway on 4 September 1969 for Yokosuka but was diverted by a trip from Okinawa to Danang and finally arrived at her home port on 23 September 1969. She remained there until 9 October 1969 when she transported a detachment of Marines and equipment from Okinawa to Numazu, Japan.

Departing Japan on 28 October 1969, Washoe County participated in Operation Keystone Cardinal, a major troop redeployment lift from Vietnam. During November, Washoe County steamed more than 7,000 nautical miles (12,964 kilometers) bringing troops and equipment from Vietnam to Okinawa before returning to Yokosuka on 3 December 1969 for annual inspections and the Christmas holiday season.

Washoe County took station as a Seafloat support vessel from 20 January 1970 to 12 March 1970 and again from 17 May 1970 to 2 August 1970. Between these two deployments, Washoe County served as station ship in Hong Kong from 18 March 1970 to 27 March 1970.

On 12 August 1970, Washoe County arrived at Osaka, Japan, to enjoy four days at the World's Fair, Expo 70. From 19 August 1970 to 19 September 1970, she underwent upkeep at Yokosuka and then made a visit to Hong Kong.

After stopping at Chu Lai, Vietnam, and Subic Bay, the Philippines, to load cargo on board, Washoe County headed for the California coast, via Pearl Harbor, arriving at San Diego on 10 November 1970. She offloaded Marine cargo at Camp Pendleton on 13 November 1970, then made a port visit to San Francisco.

Washoe County earned a Presidential Unit Citation, a Navy Unit Commendation, a Meritorious Unit Commendation, and twelve campaign stars for Vietnam War service. The campaign stars were for:

- Vietnam Defense 10 July 1965 – 18 July 1965, 13 August 1965 – 17 August 1965, and 28 August 1965 – 15 September 1965
- Vietnamese Counteroffensive 21 February 1966 – 26 February 1966 and 10 March 1966 – 20 May 1966
- Vietnamese Counteroffensive Phase II 2 July 1966 – 7 July 1966, 19 July 1966 – 24 July 1966, 10 September 1966 – 14 September 1966, 29 September 1966 – 6 October 1966, 16 October 1966 – 19 October 1966, 6 January 1967 – 25 January 1967, 15 February 1967 – 12 March 1967, 21 April 1967 – 28 April 1967, and 9 May 1967 – 15 May 1967
- Vietnamese Counteroffensive Phase III 2 July 1967 – 10 July 1967, 15 September 1967 – 26 September 1967, and 7 October 1967 – 3 December 1967
- Tet Counteroffensive 12 March 1968 – 19 March 1968 and 26 May 1968 – 1 April 1968
- Vietnamese Counteroffensive Phase IV 2 April 1968 – 7 April 1968 and 20 June 1968 – 30 June 1968
- Vietnamese Counteroffensive Phase V 1 July 1968 – 8 July 1968, 22 July 1968 – 2 September 1968, and 24 October 1968 – 1 November 1968
- Vietnamese Counteroffensive Phase VI 2 November 1968 – 11 December 1968
- Vietnam Summer-Fall 1969 22 June 1969-12 August 1969 and 13 September 1969 – 16 September 1969
- Vietnam Winter-Spring 1970 3 November 1969-12 November 1969, 19 November 1969 – 24 November 1969, and 19 December 1969 – 17 March 1970
- Sanctuary Counteroffensive 14 May 1970 – 30 June 1970
- Vietnamese Counteroffensive Phase VII 1 July 1970 – 5 August 1970 and 1 October 1970 – 8 October 1970

== Decommissioning ==
On 24 November 1970, Washoe County arrived at Bremerton, Washington, and, on 25 November 1970, her status changed to "in commission, in reserve." On 25 March 1971, the ship was decommissioned.

== Military Sealift Command service ==
Washoe County was reactivated in January 1973 to serve as a cargo ship in a non-commissioned status with a civil service crew with the Military Sealift Command in January 1973, being designated the United States Naval Ship USNS Washoe County (T-LST-1165). This service continued until she was stricken from the Navy List on 1 November 1973. At that time, she was transferred to the Maritime Administration for layup in the National Defense Reserve Fleet at Suisun Bay, Benicia, California. The Washoe County was converted to civilian use at Todd Shipyard in Long Beach, California during the summer of 1972 and was crewed on 12 October by her civil service complement.

== Transfer to Peru ==
On 7 August 1984, Washoe County and three of her sister ships -- USS Traverse County (LST-1160), USS Waldo County (LST-1163), and USS Walworth County (LST-1164)—were leased to Peru, and Washoe County was commissioned into service in the Peruvian Navy as BAP Callao (DT-143) on 4 March 1985. Peru renewed the lease on all four ships in August 1989 and August 1994, and the United States sold all four outright to Peru under the Security Assistance Program on 26 April 1999; all four were struck from the U.S. Naval Register on the day of the sale.

== Notes ==
A section of interstate 80 at the state line of California and Nevada/Washoe County celebrates the crew of the USS Washoe County, the sign is located beneath the "WELCOME TO NEVADA" sign.

== See also ==
- List of United States Navy LSTs
