= Terrebonne Parish-class tank landing ship =

Class of United States Navy tank landing ships

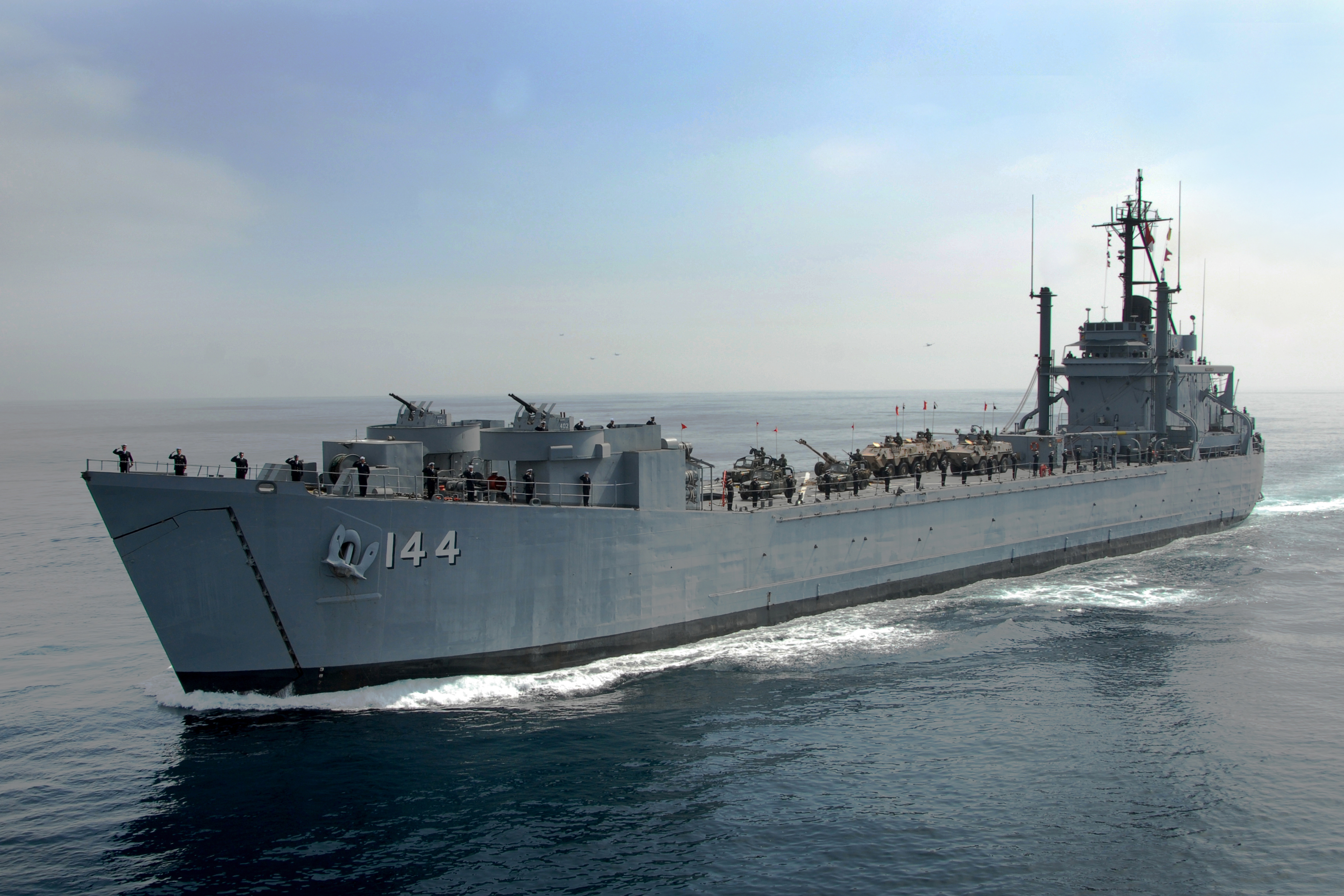
- BAP Eten

Class overview
- Name: Terrebonne Parish class
- Builders: Bath Iron Works; Ingalls Shipbuilding; Christy Shipbuilding
- Operators: United States Navy; Spanish Navy; Hellenic Navy; Peruvian Navy; Bolivarian Navy of Venezuela; Turkish Navy
- Preceded by: Talbot County class
- Succeeded by: De Soto County class
- Built: 1952-1954
- In commission: 1952-1973
- Planned: 15
- Completed: 15
- Laid up: 1
- Retired: 15

General characteristics
- Type: Tank landing ship
- Displacement: 2,590 long tons (2,632 t) light; 5,800 long tons (5,893 t) full load
- Length: 384 ft (117 m)
- Beam: 55 ft (17 m)
- Draft: 17 ft 8 in (5.38 m)
- Propulsion: 4 × General Motors 16-278A diesel engines; 2 × shafts; Controllable pitch propellers
- Speed: 14 knots (26 km/h; 16 mph)
- Boats & landing craft carried: 3 × LCVPs; 1 × LCPL
- Capacity: 28 medium tanks or vehicles to 75 tons on 288 ft (88 m) tank deck; 100,000 gal (US) diesel or jet fuel, plus 7,000 gal fuel for embarked vehicles
- Troops: 395 officers and enlisted men
- Complement: 16 officers and 189 enlisted men
- Armament: 3 × 3 in (76 mm)/50 cal Mark 22 guns; 5 × Oerlikon 20 mm cannons
- Aviation facilities: Helipad

The Terrebonne Parish-class tank landing ship was a class of tank landing ship of United States Navy and later sold to the Spanish, Hellenic, Peruvian, Venezuelan and Turkish Navy.

== Development ==
In the 1950s, fifteen ships were authorized to begin construction by three shipbuilding companies (Bath Iron Works, Ingalls Shipbuilding and Christy Shipbuilding). Three batches of five ships were built by each companies from 1952 until 1954. Several ships proceed to serve in the Vietnam War.

All ships were put out of service in the United States from 1970 to 1973, with many being transferred to foreign service which some were in service until the mid-2010s.

Washtenaw County was sold for commercial service but was abandoned in 1980 in which she remained afloat at the Columbia River as of 6 December 2021. The ship has been heavily vandalized and stripped of parts throughout the years but despite that, efforts were still being done to repair and make her into a museum ship. She is also the only ship converted into a mine sweeper from her class.

== Ships of class ==
Pennant number	Name	Callsign	Builders	Launched	Commissioned	Decommissioned	Fate
Terrebonne Parish-class tank landing ship
LST-1156	Terrebonne Parish	NLOU	Bath Iron Works	9 August 1952	21 November 1952	29 October 1971	Sold to Spain and renamed Velasco (L11), later scrapped in 1994
LST-1157	Terrell County	NNAG	Bath Iron Works	6 December 1952	14 March 1953	25 March 1971	Sold to Greece and renamed Inouse (L-104), later sunk as target on 4 October 2007
LST-1158	Tioga County	NDPR	Bath Iron Works	11 April 1953	20 June 1953	23 December 1970	Scrapped on 17 August 2005
LST-1159	Tom Green County	NCEH	Bath Iron Works	2 July 1953	12 September 1953	5 January 1972	Sold to Spain and renamed Conde del Venadito (L13), fate unknown
LST-1160	Traverse County	NEWO	Bath Iron Works	3 October 1953	19 December 1953	30 November 1970	Sold to Peru and renamed BAP Eten (DT-144). Sunk as target September 2026
LST-1161	Vernon County	NBTB	Ingalls Shipbuilding	25 November 1952	18 May 1953	14 June 1973	Sold to Venezuela and renamed ARV Amazonas (T-21), fate unknown
LST-1162	Wahkiakum County	NHPW	Ingalls Shipbuilding	23 January 1953	13 August 1953	16 October 1970	Scrapped on 22 June 2005
LST-1163	Waldo County		Ingalls Shipbuilding	17 May 1953	17 September 1953	21 December 1970	Sold to Peru and renamed BAP Pisco (DT-142), scrapped in 2012
LST-1164	Walworth County	NEMX	Ingalls Shipbuilding	15 May 1953	26 October 1953	2 April 1971	Sold to Peru and renamed BAP Paita (DT-141), fate unknown
LST-1165	Washoe County	NMHV	Ingalls Shipbuilding	14 July 1953	30 November 1953	25 November 1970	Sold to Peru and renamed BAP Callao (DT-143), sunk as target on 30 September 2021
LST-1166 / MSS-2	Washtenaw County	NFLX	Christy Shipbuilding	22 November 1952	29 October 1953	30 August 1973	Sold to commercial service, abandoned and laid up at Columbia River since 1980
LST-1167	Westchester County	NCBI	Christy Shipbuilding	18 April 1953	10 March 1954	30 November 1973	Sold to Turkey and renamed TCG Serdar (L-402), sunk as target on 30 May 2014
LST-1168	Wexford County	NRHA	Christy Shipbuilding	28 November 1953	15 June 1954	29 October 1971	Sold to Spain and renamed Martín Álvarez (L-12), scrapped in 1995
LST-1169	Whitfield County	NNZE	Christy Shipbuilding	22 August 1953	14 September 1954	15 March 1973	Sold to Greece and renamed Kos (L-116), sunk as target on 24 June 2004
LST-1170	Windham County	NPNC	Christy Shipbuilding	22 May 1954	15 December 1954	1 June 1973	Sold to Turkey and renamed TCG Ertuğrul (L-401), fate unknown
