= Operation Handclasp =

Operation Handclasp was a 1958 joint Air Force-Navy operation conducted with the U.S. Navy's U.S. 7th Fleet to demonstrate military weapons for Asian political and military leaders.

== Example of use ==
DANFS contains numerous references to this operation. For example, see USS Alvin C. Cockrell (DE-366).

Operation Handclasp is not to be confused with Project Handclasp an official U.S. Navy program that distributes materials donated in the U.S. to less economically well-off residents of foreign countries on behalf of American citizens.
