= Onslow Beach =

Beach in North Carolina, U.S.

Coordinates: 34.570442°N 77.2685663°W

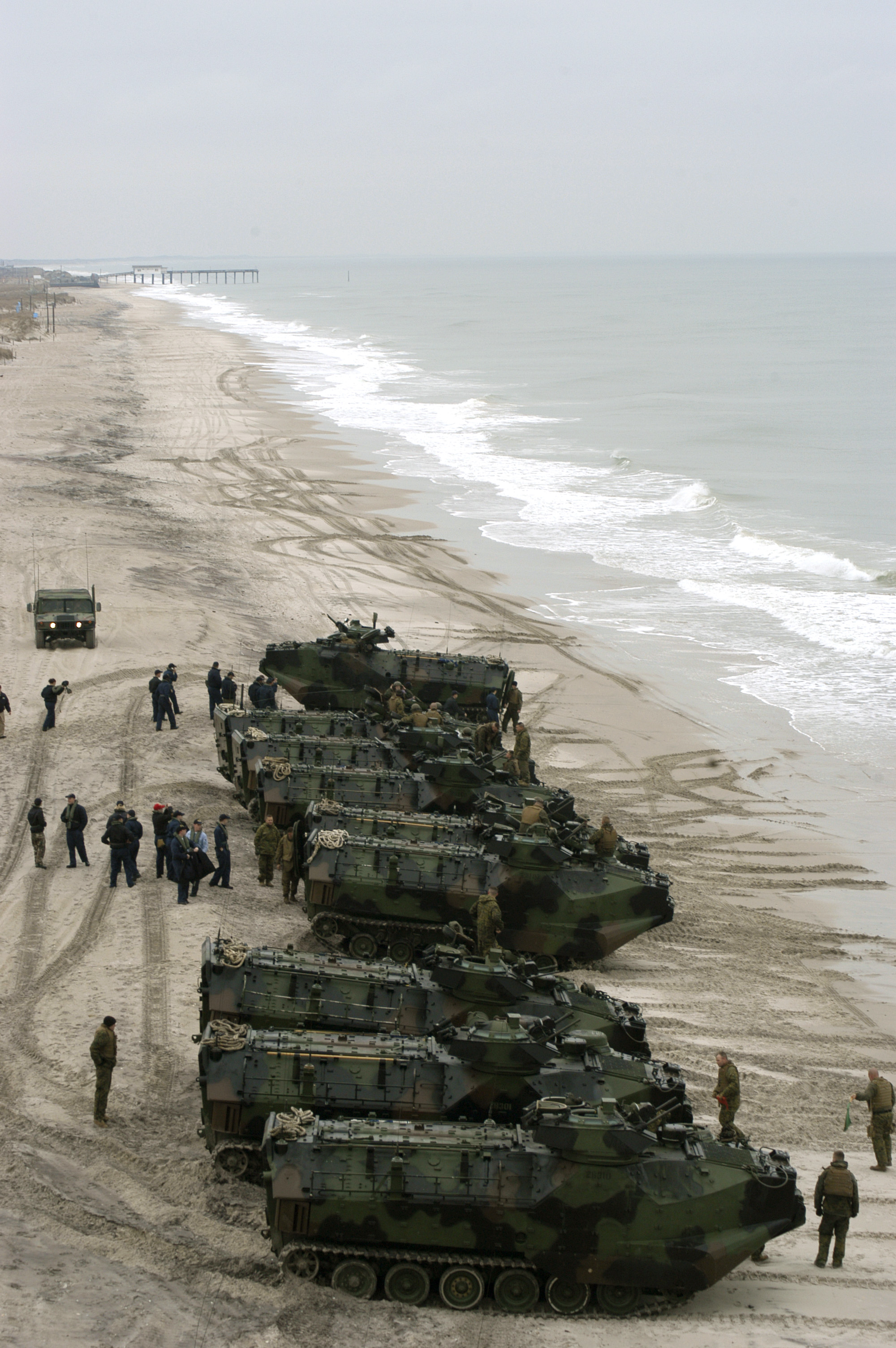
Amphibious Assault Vehicles on Onslow Beach during a beach invasion exercise in 2006

Onslow Beach is a 7.5 miles (12 km) stretch of undeveloped beach at Marine Corps Base Camp Lejeune in Onslow County, North Carolina, United States. It has been used at various times for practice amphibious landings by the U.S. Marine Corps. Presently, it is used as a recreational area by the Camp Lejeune community.

| Preceded by Hammocks Beach | Beaches of Southeastern North Carolina | Succeeded by North Topsail Beach |
