= APL-17-class barracks ship =

Class of United States Navy barrack ships

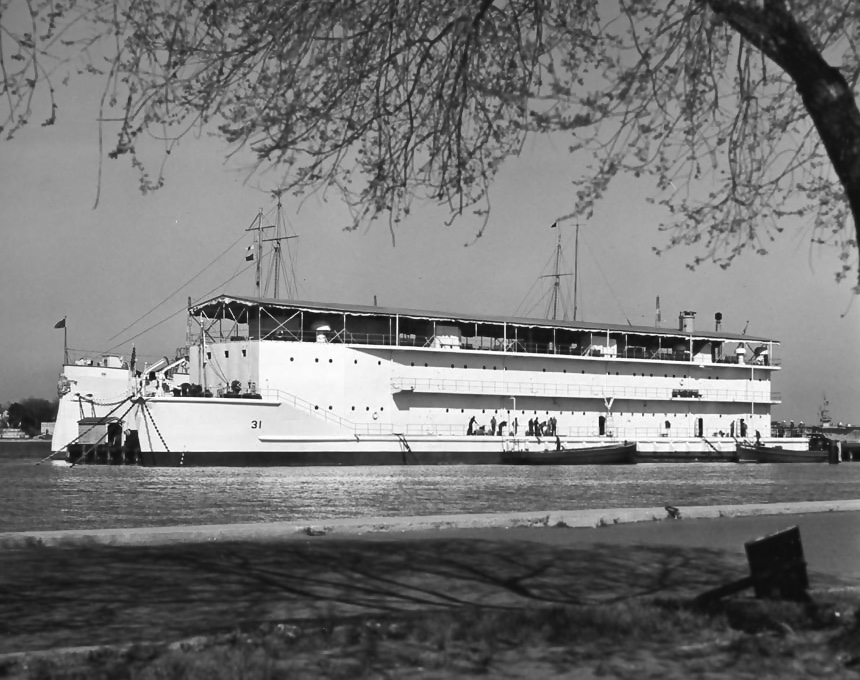
- USS APL-31

Class overview
- Name: APL-17 class
- Builders: Pollock-Stockton Shipbuilding Co.; Boston Navy Yard; Everett-Pacific Shipbuilding; Tampa Shipbuilding Co.
- Operators: United States Navy; United States Coast Guard; Republic of Vietnam Navy; Vietnam People's Navy
- Preceded by: APL-2 class
- Succeeded by: APL-41 class
- Built: 1944-1946
- In commission: 1944-1946
- Planned: 24
- Completed: 18
- Canceled: 6
- Active: 3
- Laid up: 1
- Retired: 15

General characteristics
- Type: Barracks ship
- Displacement: 1,300 t (1,279 long tons) (standard); 2,660 t (2,618 long tons) (full load)
- Length: 260 ft 0 in (79.25 m)
- Beam: 49 ft 2 in (14.99 m)
- Draft: 8 ft 6 in (2.59 m)
- Installed power: 100kW 450 AC
- Propulsion: 3 × Diesel generators
- Capacity: 0 officers; 583 enlisted; 1,000 Bbls (Diesel)
- Complement: 6 officers; 66 enlisted
- Armament: 4 × Oerlikon 20 mm cannons

The APL-17-class barracks ship was a class of barracks ships of the United States Navy after the start of the Second World War, in the 1940s.

== Development ==
Eighteen ships were built during World War II with 6 cancelled, later built as Benewah-class. Franklin D. Roosevelt approved the construction of tenders and repair ships in May 1943, it was then recommended by the Auxiliary Vessels Board on 11 June later that year, the construction of barracks ships.

The class consists of barges with a two-story barracks built on top instead of a warehouse design, and they had an auxiliary vessel designation of "A". Moreover, on their top deck, 4 Oerlikon 20 mm cannons were placed together with 2 guns and their platforms located on each side of the ship. The guns were later removed after being put into the reserve fleet in 1946.

During the Vietnam War, 4 ships (APL-21, 26, 27 and 30) were dispatched to South Vietnam, with APL-26 and 27 later transferred to South Vietnam. The two ships were captured by North Vietnam in April 1975.

Since 2011, only 3 ships have been in service at Naval Station San Diego, Mayport and Norfolk. Notably, APL-24 served as a headquarter for the Suisun Bay Reserve Fleet for the Maritime Administration, since 23 May 1962. On 7 June 1946, APL-33 became the only ship of the class to be intentionally sunk because after grounding in Okinawa, caused by a typhoon.

== Ships of class ==
APL-17-class barracks ship
Name	Builders	Laid down	Launched	Commissioned	Decommissioned	Fate
APL-17	Tampa Shipbuilding Co.	15 May 1944	2 July 1944	20 September 1944	-	Scrapped on 14 January 1971
APL-18	Tampa Shipbuilding Co.	15 May 1944	2 July 1944	29 September 1944	-	CincPacFlt Berthing and Messing Program and is berthed at San Diego
APL-19	Tampa Shipbuilding Co.	21 June 1944	6 August 1944	14 October 1944	-	Sunk as target on 13 June 2002
APL-20	Tampa Shipbuilding Co.	20 July 1944	3 September 1944	2 November 1944	-	Sold to commercial service as merchant barge Northern Shell (ON 571572), 1974
APL-21	Tampa Shipbuilding Co.	29 July 1944	3 September 1944	16 February 1945	-	Scrapped in 1972
APL-22	Tampa Shipbuilding Co.	5 August 1944	12 February 1945	24 March 1945	-	Sold to commercial service as merchant barge FOSS 251., 1961
APL-23	Pollock-Stockton Shipbuilding Co.	24 July 1944	26 September 1944	7 June 1945	-	Disposed in 1971
APL-24	Pollock-Stockton Shipbuilding Co.	24 July 1944	26 September 1944	24 July 1945	-	Suisun Bay Reserve Fleet Headquarters for the Maritime Administration
APL-25	Pollock-Stockton Shipbuilding Co.	24 July 1944	24 December 1944	28 September 1945	-	Sold to commercial service as merchant barge MLC-262 (ON 563795), 1973
APL-26	Pollock-Stockton Shipbuilding Co.	24 July 1944	29 December 1944	18 January 1946	-	Transferred to South Vietnam and redesignated HQ-9050, March 1971
APL-27	Tampa Shipbuilding Co.	10 August 1944	15 October 1944	9 April 1945	-	Transferred to South Vietnam and redesignated HQ-9051, March 1971
APL-28	Tampa Shipbuilding Co.	30 October 1944	10 December 1944	30 April 1945	-	Sold to commercial service, 1960
APL-29	Tampa Shipbuilding Co.	30 October 1944	10 October 1944	14 May 1945	-	CincPacFlt Berthing and Messing Program and is berthed at Norfolk
APL-30	Everett Pacific Shipbuilding Co.	1 June 1944	6 September 1944	11 April 1945	-	Scrapped on 1 February 1975
APL-31	Everett Pacific Shipbuilding Co.	1 June 1944	30 September 1944	14 June 1945	-	Sunk as artificial reef on 23 July 2001
APL-32	Boston Navy Yard	5 September 1944	12 October 1944	17 January 1945	-	CincPacFlt Berthing and Messing Program and is berthed at Mayport
APL-33	Boston Navy Yard	18 November 1944	1 January 1945	5 April 1945	12 April 1946	Destroyed on 7 June 1946
APL-34	Boston Navy Yard	18 November 1944	1 January 1945	16 May 1945	-	Sold to Defense Reutilization and Marketing Service, 7 May 2004
APL-35	Converted to Benewah-class barracks ship as USS Benewah (APB-35)					
APL-36	Converted to Benewah-class barracks ship as USS Colleton (APB-36)					
APL-37	Converted to Benewah-class barracks ship as USS Echols (APB-37)					
APL-38	Converted to Benewah-class barracks ship as USS Marlboro (APB-38)					
APL-39	Converted to Benewah-class barracks ship as USS Mercer (APB-39)					
APL-40	Converted to Benewah-class barracks ship as USS Nueces (APB-40)					

== See also ==
- Barracks ship
- List of auxiliaries of the United States Navy § Barracks Craft (APL)
