= USS Whitfield County =

United States Navy landing ship tank

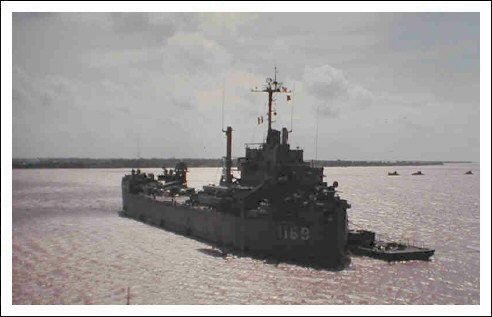
- USS Whitfield County off South Vietnam, ca. 1968

History

United States
- Name: USS LST-1169
- Builder: Christy Corporation, Sturgeon Bay, Wisconsin
- Laid down: 26 November 1952
- Launched: 22 August 1953
- Commissioned: 14 September 1954
- Renamed: USS Whitfield County, 1 July 1955
- Namesake: Whitfield County, Georgia
- Decommissioned: 15 March 1973
- Stricken: 15 August 1976
- Honors and awards: A Presidential Unit Citation, 3 Navy Unit Commendations, 3 Meritorious Unit Commendations, and 11 battle stars for Vietnam War service
- Fate: Sold to Greece, 1 March 1977

Greece
- Name: Kos
- Acquired: 1 March 1977
- Decommissioned: 1 June 2000
- Identification: L116
- Fate: Sunk as target, 24 June 2004

General characteristics
- Class & type: Terrebonne Parish-class tank landing ship
- Displacement: 2,590 tons (light); 5,800 tons (full)
- Length: 384 ft (117 m)
- Beam: 55 ft (17 m)
- Draft: 17 ft (5.2 m)
- Installed power: 6,000 shp (4,500 kW)
- Propulsion: Four General Motors 16-278A diesel engines, two controllable-pitch propellers
- Speed: 14 knots (26 km/h; 16 mph)
- Boats & landing craft carried: 3 x landing craft, vehicle, personnel LCVPs, 1 x landing craft personnel (large) LCPL
- Troops: 395 (15 officers, 380 enlisted men)
- Complement: 205 (16 officers, 189 enlisted men)
- Armor: 3 × twin 3 in (76 mm) dual-purpose gun mounts; 5 × single 20 mm antiaircraft gun mounts

USS Whitfield County (LST-1169), previously USS LST-1169, was a United States Navy landing ship tank (LST) in commission from 1954 to 1973 which saw service in the Atlantic, Caribbean, and Pacific and saw action in the Vietnam War.

== Early career ==
USS LST-1169 was designed under project SCB 9A and laid down on 26 November 1952 at Sturgeon Bay, Wisconsin, by the Christy Corporation. She was launched on 22 August 1953, sponsored by Mrs. John L. Clarkson of Lake Forest, Illinois, and commissioned on 14 September 1954.

After shakedown training in the Gulf of Mexico, LST-1169 departed New Orleans, Louisiana, on 13 October 1954, bound for her home port, Naval Amphibious Base Little Creek at Virginia Beach, Virginia Upon arrival in the Tidewater, Virginia, area, she entered the Norfolk Naval Shipyard in Portsmouth, Virginia, for an availability that lasted from 25 October 1954 to 4 November 1954. She then joined Landing Ship Tank Division 44, Squadron 4, Flotilla 2, Amphibious Force, United States Atlantic Fleet. For the remainder of 1954, LST-1169 operated locally in the Chesapeake Bay.

Following a short availability at Norfolk Navy Yard between 5 January 1955 and 22 January 1955, LST-1169 made a run to Havana, Cuba, and, upon her return, reentered the shipyard for further work. She cleared Norfolk, Virginia, on 11 April 1955, bound for the Caribbean, and took part in amphibious warfare exercises at Vieques Island, Puerto Rico, with a reconnaissance team embarked. During that deployment, LST-1169 visited Charlotte Amalie on St. Thomas in the United States Virgin Islands before heading home on 29 April 1955 with units of the 3rd Battalion of the United States Marine Corps's 10th Marine Regiment embarked. After debarking the Marines at Morehead City, North Carolina, LST-1169 pressed northward, reaching Norfolk on 6 May 1955. Except for a brief cruise to Boston, Massachusetts, between 14 June 1955 and 23 June 1955, LST-1169 remained at Little Creek well into the summer of 1955.

Renamed USS Whitfield County (LST-1169) on 1 July 1955, she remained engaged in local operations into 1956, a year in which she underwent an overhaul at Norfolk Navy Yard between 21 January 1956 and 23 May 1956. She then operated in the Chesapeake Bay and off the Virginia Capes until 13 August 1956, when she got underway for the United States West Coast. After skirting a Caribbean hurricane, she transited the Panama Canal on 20 August 1956. Shortly after leaving Rodman Naval Station, Panama Canal Zone, Whitfield County suffered an explosion and fire. The repairs necessitated by that accident delayed her arrival at her new home port, San Diego, California, until 5 September 1956.

Upon arrival at San Diego, Whitfield County became flagship for Landing Ship Tank Division 12, an assignment that soon changed when she was transferred to Landing Ship Tank Division 11. She soon commenced a regular slate of divisional and squadron exercises out of San Diego that stretched into August 1957.

Whitfield County departed San Diego on 13 August 1957 to begin her first deployment to the Western Pacific (WestPac). She called at Pearl Harbor, Hawaii, between 24 August 1957 and 4 September 1957 and reached Yokosuka, Japan, on 16 September 1957. A little over a week later, she proceeded to Camp McGill to load vehicles and embark troops for the first of several amphibious exercises. After maneuvers at Okinawa, Whitfield County returned her passengers and cargo to Fukuoka, Japan, before she visited Sasebo, Japan, en route to Yokosuka, where she arrived on 11 October 1957.

On 14 October 1957, Whitfield County sailed to Iwakuni, Japan, to pick up troops for additional landing exercises at Okinawa, returning to Yokosuka on 31 October 1957. She departed Japanese waters on 3 November 1957 and reached Son Gap To, South Korea, soon thereafter, beaching on 7 November 1957 and 8 November 1957 to load cargo that she returned to Yokosuka on 12 November 1957. On 18 November 1957, after again loading troops and vehicles, Whitfield County sailed for Okinawa, offloading her cargo upon arrival and taking on board units of the 12th Marine Regiment, 3rd Marine Division.

Whitfield County arrived at Dingalan Bay, Luzon, the Philippines, on 30 November 1957 and served as the base for a reconnaissance team during amphibious exercises that lasted until 10 December 1957. She then joined elements of the United States Seventh Fleet at sea for exercises which kept her busy until she arrived at Subic Bay, the Philippines, on 26 December 1957.

Whitfield County remained there into 1958 before steaming to Naha, Okinawa, on 4 February 1958, for the first of two voyages lifting Marines and their vehicles. She arrived back at Dingalan Bay on 26 February 1958 for exercises in which she acted as receiving ship for simulated battle casualties. On 8 March 1958, Whitfield County headed for the U.S. West Coast and reached San Diego on 31 March 1958.

Between 14 April 1958 and 3 May 1958, Whitfield County underwent an overhaul at the National Steel and Shipbuilding Corporation, San Diego. She then operated off the southern California coast into the summer. Her routine was broken late in July 1958 during the crisis in Lebanon, when American armed forces went on alert for a global posture of readiness. During that time, she cruised to Pearl Harbor between 25 July 1958 and 20 August 1958, after which time she resumed her regular routine out of San Diego.

Shifting to San Francisco and later to Mare Island Navy Yard at Vallejo, California, and Alameda, California, Whitfield County underwent an overhaul at the Todd Shipyards Corporation in preparation for the ship's second Western Pacific deployment. She sailed for the Far East on 23 April 1959, called at Pearl Harbor en route, and reached Yokosuka on 22 May 1959. She then visited Hong Kong between 9 June 1959 and 16 June 1959 and returned to Sasebo on 21 June 1959, via Naha, Okinawa. She then lifted landing vehicles tracked (LVTs) to Chinhae, South Korea, between 22 June 1959 and 28 June 1959 before returning to Sasebo.

Subsequently, loading elements of the 3rd Marine Division at Naha on 6 July 1959, Whitfield County transported the Marines to Numazu, Japan, arriving there a week later. Shifting to Yokosuka shortly thereafter, Whitfield County remained there into August 1959, undergoing needed upkeep and conducting local operations.

Underway for Inchon, South Korea, on 5 August 1959, Whitfield County rendezvoused with other units of Landing Ship Squadron 1 and took part in Operation Seahorse, a full-scale joint amphibious exercise with embarked units of the United States Army's 7th Cavalry Regiment. En route to the maneuver site, Whitfield County evaded Typhoon Ellen. Embarking the elements of the 7th Cavalry at Inchon soon after her arrival on 12 August 1959, Whitfield County sortied for Pohang Dong, on the coast of South Korea, to take part in Operation Seahorse. Whitfield County proved to be the only landing ship tank involved, because the other units of Landing Ship Squadron 1 had been unable to reach the area due to typhoon evasion maneuvers.

Visiting Otaru and Hakodate, Japan, at the end of August 1959 as part of President Dwight D. Eisenhower's People-to-People Program, Whitfield County was en route to Buckner Bay, Okinawa, for routine training evolutions with amphibious tractor units of the 3rd Marine Division when she was diverted for contingency loading at Naha, Okinawa. She received those orders in light of a developing crisis in the landlocked kingdom of Laos.

Whitfield County remained in a high state of readiness in the Okinawa area from 7 September 1959 to 12 October 1959. She steamed between Naha and Buckner Bay during that time and also conducted routine training evolutions, making one transit of the Taiwan Strait and evading five typhoons. During that period, the ship earned a well-done from Commander, Amphibious Squadron 1, for her contributions to relief efforts for Japanese victims of Typhoon Vera.

Ordered to Sasebo on 12 October 1959, Whitfield County underwent voyage repairs there. She cleared that port on 2 November 1959, bound for the U.S. West Coast, and reached San Diego on 24 November 1959. She then remained at her home port in leave and upkeep status for the remainder of 1959.

Following local operations out of her home port into the summer of 1960, including participation in Operation Swandive, held off Camp Pendleton on 8 February 1960 and 9 February 1960, and Operation Bigtop, held between 2 May 1960 and 10 May 1960, Whitfield County got underway for her third Western Pacific tour. After stopping briefly at Pearl Harbor between 22 June 1960 and 26 June 1960, she joined Landing Ship Squadron 9 in Japan on 1 July 1960.

Home-ported then at Yokosuka, Japan, Whitfield County would remain in the Far East until 1973. Her operating schedule reflected the growing American involvement in the affairs of Southeast Asia, particularly in Vietnam.

Whitfield County spent the better part of August 1960 conducting independent ship exercises and transporting Marines between Naha and Numazu and back. She also engaged in the usual typhoon evasions common to operations in that area of the world. In September 1960, she departed Yokosuka for a six-week cruise that was slated to take her to Okinawa, Hong Kong, and Subic Bay, but, soon after leaving Okinawa, she received word to report to Subic Bay. There, she rendezvoused with landing ship tank Windham County and set out for Singapore in the Federated Malay States, on 26 September 1960.

Reaching Singapore on 30 September 1960, the two landing ships tank embarked 600 Malayan troops and their gear, part of a United Nations (UN) force assigned peacekeeping duties in the turbulent Belgian Congo.

Departing Singapore on 3 October 1960, Whitfield County and Windham County tarried briefly at Port Swettenham, Federation of Malaya, to complete the loading and embarkation process begun at Singapore. On 4 October 1960, the two amphibious ships departed Port Swettenham, bound for the port of Matadi, located on the Congo River.

The ships steamed for 27 consecutive days, crossing the Indian Ocean, rounding the Cape of Good Hope on 22 October 1960, and reaching the mouth of the Congo River on 31 October 1960. They then ascended the river some 82 nautical miles (152 km; 94 mi) to Matadi. After disembarking the 600 troops and their equipment, the two ships departed Matadi on 2 November 1960. They arrived at Cape Town, South Africa, on 11 November 1960. They then visited Singapore and Hong Kong before returning to Yokosuka on 20 December 1960. Whitfield County spent the remainder of 1960 in port there.

From 1961 through mid-1964, Whitfield County continued her operations out of Sasebo and ranged from Okinawa to Japan, with port visits at Japanese ports, and to Hong Kong. She also operated upon occasion at Subic Bay.

== Vietnam War ==
In mid-1964, the tempo of operations for the tank landing ship began to change, reflecting the increased role that the United States was playing in Vietnam. On 22 July 1964, Whitfield County departed Yokosuka for a routine trip to Okinawa, but was called away for duty off the coast of Vietnam. She remained at sea for 41 days with Marines embarked, on station off the coast of South Vietnam and ready for contingencies. During that time, the Tonkin Gulf Incident occurred early in August 1964 and further escalated tensions between the United States and North Vietnam.

Whitfield County returned to Yokosuka early in October 1964 for much-needed leave and upkeep. She next conducted type training, made a troop lift from Numazu to Okinawa, and underwent more upkeep in November and December 1964, before rounding out the year in readiness to operate in South Vietnamese waters once more if the situation demanded it.

With a logistical support load on board, Whitfield County departed Okinawa, bound for South Vietnam. She arrived at Da Nang on 5 January 1965 and offloaded part of the cargo before shifting to Chu Lai to discharge the remainder. She sailed for Subic Bay on 6 January 1965, as part of the Subic-South Vietnam shuttle force. Arriving at Subic Bay on 9 January, she took on a load of cargo earmarked for Vietnamese ports and sailed for Da Nang on 16 January with another logistical support load on board.

After unloading that cargo at Da Nang, Whitfield County shifted to Cam Ranh Bay, to load cargo for transport to Phan Rang and Saigon. Ultimately reaching Saigon on 28 January and unloading the remaining cargo, she took on board cargo to be lifted to Qui Nhơn, South Vietnam. Subsequently, routed onward to Okinawa after loading cargo at Da Nang, she reached Okinawa on 10 February.

Taking on board elements of the U.S. Army's 4th Cavalry Regiment, Whitfield County proceeded to Saigon, reaching that port on 20 February. After returning to Okinawa, via Da Nang and Keelung, Taiwan, Whitfield County subsequently steamed back to Vietnamese waters with elements of the 1st Marine Division embarked and put the Marines ashore at Chu Lai. She continued her busy pace of operations, carrying return cargo from Da Nang to Okinawa, arriving at Okinawa on 2 April, before she embarked U.S. Marine Corps elements for maneuvers at Numazu. Reaching her destination on 6 April, she immediately disembarked the Marines and returned to Yokosuka for overhaul.

Following that yard work and the ensuing refresher training, Whitfield County remained at Yokosuka through much of the summer before sailing for Iwakuni, Japan, and arriving there on 27 August to load equipment and embark men of Marine Aircraft Group (MAG) 13 for transfer to South Vietnam. Underway on 29 August, Whitfield County reached Chu Lai on 6 September. She then returned to Japan and made a second trip from Iwakuni to Chu Lai, bringing in the second element of MAG-13.

Whitfield County proceeded thence to Da Nang to embark elements of Marine Battalion Landing Team (BLT) 1st Battalion, 9th Marines for passage to Okinawa. She then proceeded to Naha, where she took on board the men and equipment of the Army's 526th Engineering Detachment. Offloading at Qui Nhơn, the ship shifted to Chu Lai and Da Nang, where she loaded return equipment and sailed for Okinawa. Upon delivering her equipment to Okinawa, she pushed on for Japan and reached Yokosuka on 24 October.

Whitfield County's upkeep period in Japan lasted into November, when she headed for Hong Kong and six days of rest and recreation. Departing on 23 November, Whitfield County proceeded to Kaohsiung, Taiwan, where she loaded 600 tons of cement slated for transport to South Vietnam. Reaching Phan Rang on 30 November, she offloaded her cargo and departed on 1 December, bound for Da Nang. The normally short trip became a four-day voyage after she ran into heavy weather soon after leaving Phan Rang, but she finally reached Da Nang on 5 December, and took on board equipment for lift to Okinawa. After first offloading the retrograde cargo at Naha, Whitfield County reached her home port of Yokosuka on 15 December, and remained there into late December.

=== 1967 ===
Whitfield County sailed for Vietnamese waters on 29 December, bound for Vũng Tàu and her first deployment with riverine forces. Slated to join River Assault Flotilla 1, Whitfield County arrived at Vũng Tàu on 7 January 1967, embarked a river pilot and one River Assault Flotilla liaison officer and proceeded up the muddy Long Tau River to Saigon. She subsequently beached at Newport South Ramp that evening and remained there until 10 January 1967, embarking men and equipment of River Assault Flotilla I.

Departing Saigon on 10 January 1967, Whitfield County arrived at Vũng Tàu late that same evening. The next day she began providing messing, berthing, and logistical support for the men of the river assault force and the 1,800 troops from the U.S. Army's 9th Division, who were training with the riverine forces. On 26 February 1967, Whitfield County weighed anchor and headed for Yokosuka, arriving there on 9 March 1967. On 5 April 1967, she got underway for Okinawa to load cargo for South Vietnam. A port visit slated for 11 April 1967 at Keelung, Taiwan, was cancelled due to the urgent need for landing ships tank for the impending Operation Oregon. Whitfield County sped to Chu Lai, reached that port on 15 April 1967, and discharged her cargo upon arrival. She then took on board 92 tons of vehicles, 200 officers and men, and the cargo of a Marine Corps headquarters battalion; and proceeded to Da Nang, where she arrived on 16 April 1967.

Offloading upon her arrival, Whitfield County came under the operational control of Naval Support Activities (NavSuppAct) Da Nang to support Operation Oregon and remained in that status until 23 April 1967. During that time, she conducted two beachings at Chu Lai and transported a total of 1,300 tons of general cargo, munitions, and vehicles.

Released from Operation Oregon on 23 April 1967, Whitfield County departed Chu Lai and headed toward the Philippines for type training and a visit to Manila. En route, however, dhr was ordered to proceed at "all best speed" to Subic Bay. Upon arrival there on 25 April 1967, she loaded cargo from attack cargo ship USS Seminole. Then, after picking up additional ammunition, Whitfield County got underway on 27 April 1967, bound for South Vietnam.

On the morning of 30 April 1967, Whitfield County rendezvoused with Amphibious Ready Group (ARG) Alfa, consisting of amphibious assault ship USS Okinawa, attack transport USS Bayfield and landing ship dock USS Point Defiance, which was then conducting Operation Beaver Cage. The operation, an over-the-beach landing in quest of one battalion and three companies of local Viet Cong (VC) guerrillas and at least one People's Army of Vietnam (PAVN) battalion, had begun on 28 April 1967.

Assigned an operational area after transferring men and mail brought out from Subic Bay, Whitfield County steamed in the amphibious objective area until 10 May 1967, when she embarked 100 patients and 100 empty oxygen bottles from hospital ship USS Sanctuary for transportation to Da Nang. Reaching Da Nang on 11 May 1967, Whitfield County returned to Amphibious Ready Group "Alfa" on the morning of 13 May 1967, again landed passengers and delivered mail, refilled oxygen bottles, ice cream and other dairy products to Sanctuary. Upon the termination of Operation Beaver Cage that afternoon, the enemy having fled, Whitfield County' proceeded to a holding area at sea northeast of Da Nang and rendezvoused with the other ships of the amphibious ready group that evening.

On 16 May 1967, in a commanders' conference on board Okinawa, the commander of Amphibious Squadron 9 revealed the next operation, Operation Beau Charger. On the morning of 17 May 1967, the task group rendezvoused with stores ship USS Regulus for replenishment and, during the early evening hours, began its approach to the Vietnamese Demilitarized Zone (DMZ).

The largest concentration of naval gunfire support ships since the Korean War (1950–1953) softened the DMZ prior to Amphibious Ready Group Alpha's assault, which was aimed at destroying enemy forces and supplies and evacuating non-combatants. At 08:00, Operation Beau Charger commenced as destroyers quickly moved in and blasted the enemy guns. Resistance at the beach was confined to sniper fire and shells from quickly silenced North Vietnamese shore batteries. Pronounced resistance came at helicopter landing zones, but despite that, the helicopter-landed Marines linked up with tank units and initiated search and destroy operations that lasted through the next week. Whitfield County operated in support of Operation Beau Charger until 25 May 1967, conducting replenishment via landing craft and boats of supplies needed ashore with craft from USS Point Defiance.

Proceeding to Da Nang on 25 May 1967, Whitfield County reached Da Nang on 26 May 1967 and, after offloading, was detached from Amphibious Ready Group Alfa. She subsequently transported a load of bombs from Da Nang to Chu Lai, loading vehicles there for transportation to Naha, before she returned to Da Nang to load equipment and embark men of Amphibious Construction Battalion 1, Detachment "B." She departed Vietnamese waters on the morning of 3 June 1967 and reached Naha on 9 June 1967. Offloading the vehicles and backloading deadlined generators, Whitfield County arrived at Yokosuka on 14 June 1967.

Whitfield County returned to Vietnamese waters in the summer of 1967 to resume her support operations for riverine activities in the Mekong Delta region of South Vietnam, basing again at Vũng Tàu. She departed Yokosuka on 28 July 1967 and reached Vũng Tàu, after a stop at Hong Kong, on 17 August 1967. Relieving landing ship tank USS Vernon County of Task Force 117 support duties on 18 August 1967, Whitfield County got underway on 20 August 1967 for the confluence of the Vam Co River and Soirap River to rendezvous with the Mobile Riverine Base (MRB).

From 20 August 1967 to 5 September 1967, Whitfield County provided "housekeeping" services and support for River Division III, "C" Company, 2nd Brigade, 9th Infantry Division, and "A" Company, 9th Battalion. She supplied ammunition, water, and rations to the troops in the field, was the focal point of helicopter support operations, served as combat store warehouse, and provided mortuary services for the killed in action periodically brought to the ship.

Toward the end of that period, on 3 September 1967, the Mobile Riverine Base shifted its base of operations from the Soirap-Vam Co area back to Vũng Tàu to support projected riverine strikes into the Rung Sat Special Zone. On 11 September 1967, the Mobile Riverine Base proceeded to the Mekong River entrance, escorted by various units of the Riverine Division, who provided minesweeping, close fire support, and reconnaissance when needed. Subsequently, while located in the Dong Tam Base Camp area, Whitfield County assisted search and destroy operations in the Cam Son secret zone, Dinh Tuong Province, Kien Hoa Province and in the Giong Troms district.

On 28 September 1967, the Mobile Riverine Base shifted again, this time to the confluence of the Cua Tien River and the Cua Dai River, to facilitate strike operations into Kien Hoa Province. Whitfield County worked in that locale until 1 October 1967, when the Mobile Riverine Base was shifted back to Dong Tam to support projected strikes into the Western Ben Zong secret zone, Dinh Troung Province, to destroy PAVN/VC forces in that area.

Whitfield County subsequently supported mobile riverine operations at Vũng Tàu and back at the junction of the Soirap and Vam Co Rivers into late October 1967. While in the latter locale, elements of the riverine forces provided the necessary security during the lower house elections for South Vietnam's parliament. Returning to Vũng Tàu on 24 October 1967, Whitfield County was relieved by landing ship tank USS Westchester County and returned to Japan.

Whitfield County underwent a period of upkeep back at Yokosuka before she returned to Vietnamese waters at the end of November 1967. She operated between Da Nang and Chu Lai through early December 1967, transporting vehicles and other cargo, before she steamed back to Yokosuka. She arrived at Yokosuka on 22 December 1967 and remained in port until late in January 1968.

=== 1968 ===
Underway on 22 January 1968 with a cargo of two pontoon causeway sections, the vehicles and men of BMU-1, and a CH-46 helicopter, with its accompanying Sea Van — an experimental housing seeing its first operational test and evaluation aboard Whitfield County — the ship headed for Vietnam. Touching at Naha en route, Whitfield County reached Da Nang on 31 January 1968, transferred the Sea Van to USS Vernon County, and relieved Vernon County as support landing ship tank for Amphibious Ready Group Bravo. With the relief and transfer of the Marines and equipment completed, Whitfield County took on board the men and mail to be transported to Amphibious Ready Group Bravo and got underway on 2 February 1968

Over the ensuing month and a half, Whitfield County operated with Amphibious Ready Group Bravo within various operating areas off the DMZ, occasionally returning to Da Nang for mail, fleet freight, and passengers for delivery to the other units of the ready group. Whitfield County also sailed to Subic Bay as part of the task force for upkeep between 21 February 1968 and 28 February 1968 before she returned to Vietnamese waters. Landing ship tank USS Terrell County relieved Whitfield County as support LST at Da Nang on 14 March 1968.

After a subsequent port call at Hong Kong and a quick run to Yokosuka for restricted availability, Whitfield County returned to Vietnamese waters for a resumption of operations with the Mobile Riverine Force in mid-July 1968 at Dong Tam, again relieving Vernon County. During her deployment with Task Force 117 in ensuing months, Whitfield County operated on a nearly non-stop, 24-hour-a-day basis, supporting the U.S. Army's 4th Battalion, 47th Infantry Regiment), 9th Infantry Division, and three helicopters of a U.S. Army aviation detachment, as well as the boats and men of River Assault Division 92. By the time landing ship tank Westchester County relieved Whitfield County on 23 September 1968, Whitfield County had travelled over 900 nautical miles (1,667 kilometers) within the Mekong Delta, processed over 25,000 hot rations, and handled roughly 4,000 tons of cargo.

Subsequently, visiting Bangkok, Thailand, for rest and recreation, Whitfield County then headed for Da Nang, where she side-loaded two causeway sections for transportation to Okinawa. She then returned to Yokosuka for repairs before again heading for Vietnam toward the end of November 1968. Touching at Subic Bay en route, she reputedly became the first landing ship tank to use water-filled causeway sections to serve as armor along the thinly-armored sides of the ship. The causeway sections were intended provide a water-filled barrier against recoilless rifle projectiles and rockets.

After relieving landing ship tank USS Washtenaw County at Dong Tam on 30 November 1968, Whitfield County spent the rest of 1968 as support landing ship tank for Mobile Riverine Group Alfa, Task Group 117.1, one of the two task groups that made up Mobile Riverine Flotilla 1. Other ships of Mobile Riverine Group Alfa were the barracks ships USS Benewah and USS Colleton, the landing craft repair ship USS Sphinx and the barracks craft USS APL-26 and USS APL-80. Embarked in Whitfield County were elements of the Army's 9th Infantry Division and a Cyclops aviation detachment, equipped with OH-6 Cayuse helicopters. The ship herself performed a fivefold role: (1) maintaining a round-the-clock, air- and water-mobile resupply readiness to provide field units with ammunition, rations, fresh water, and fuel; (2) serving as a mobile base for helicopter operations; (3) providing harassment and on-call gunfire support when necessary; (4) supplying boat service among the ships of the Mobile Riverine Group; and (5) providing subsistence, berthing, and services for embarked personnel.

=== 1969 ===
At 23:30 on 9 January 1969, the Mobile Riverine Group base at Dong Tam came under enemy rocket and mortar attack. Whitfield County went to general quarters and participated in counterbattery fire, hurling 16 rounds of 3-inch (76.2-millimeter) projectiles in the direction of the hostile fire. Although securing at midnight, Whitfield County manned her guns a half-hour later, at 00:30, lobbing three rounds of call fire.

Whitfield County subsequently shifted from Bến Tre to the Song Ham Loung anchorage and returned to Dong Tam at 11:00 on 20 January 1969 to commence turnover to Vernon County, her relief in Task Group 117.1. That night, communist forces attacked the Mobile Riverine Group and the base at Dong Tam with rockets and mortars; Whitfield County went to general quarters at 21:59 and, between 22:50 and 23:00, expended 12 rounds against the enemy artillerymen. Between 1 January 1969 and 22 January 1969, Whitfield County's gunners loosed a total of 78 rounds of call-fire, and the ship held flight quarters for the recovery of Cayuse and UH-lB Huey helicopters 306 times, without mishap. At 23:00 on 23 January 1969, Whitfield County's turnover to Vernon County was complete.

However, there was more work for Whitfield County before she could clear the muddy Vietnamese waters. At 23:21 she headed for Vũng Tàu. There, she took over from landing ship tank USS Tom Green County, which had recently been damaged in a VC rocket attack while beached at the Vũng Tàu ramps, in supporting and resupplying Task Group 117.2, Mobile Riverine Group Bravo.

Late on 24 January 1969, after loading a tank deck cargo of palletized ammunition and C rations and a main-deck load of crated supplies, spare parts, stores, and fresh provisions, Whitfield County got underway for the mouth of the Bassac River (Cua Tranh De). On the morning of 26 January 1969, Whitfield County, escorted by two river patrol boats (PBRs), transited the Bassac River without incident and over the ensuing days resupplied and provisioned the ships of Task Group 117.2, landing craft repair ship USS Satyr and barracks ships USS Mercer and USS Nueces. Whitfield County then returned to Vũng Tàu, where she was relieved as support landing ship tank for Task Group 117.2 by USS Iredell County on 30 January 1969. At noon that day, Whitfield County headed for Hong Kong.

Whitfield County spent six days at Hong Kong before she sailed for Okinawa to pick up cargo earmarked for shipment to Yokosuka. After loading vehicles and nine men from Beachmaster Unit 1, Western Pacific Detachment, at Red Beach 1, Chin Wan, Okinawa, Whitfield County proceeded on to Yokosuka, reaching that port on the morning of 17 February 1969.

After upkeep at Yokosuka in late February 1969, Whitfield County acted as observer at the Republic of Korea Navy amphibious exercise Phiblex 1-69 at Chinhae, South Korea, between 28 March 1969 and 2 April 1969. During that time, she also trained South Korean naval personnel. Whitfield County subsequently returned to Yokosuka for more upkeep before she sailed, via Subic Bay, for Vietnamese waters where she loaded side-protection causeway sections.

Arriving at Dong Tam on 8 May 1969, she there relieved Windham County as support landing ship tank for River Assault Flotilla 1, Task Force 117. As before, she operated alternately at Dong Tam, Song Ham Loung (Bến Tre), and Mỹ Tho. At 02:05 on 6 June 1969, while Whitfield County was at Dong Tam, four rounds of hostile fire landed between 50 and 300 yards (46 and 274 meters) from the ships of the Mobile Riverine Force. Whitfield County immediately set general quarters; and, in the next 35 minutes, her guns hurled some 140 rounds of 3-inch (76.2-millimeter) counterbattery fire at the enemy artillery. The riverine force again came under enemy fire that morning; Whitfield County again blasted the enemy positions with 170 more 3-inch (76.2-millimeter) projectiles.

Whitfield County subsequently shifted to Bến Tre but returned to Dong Tam by 13 June 1969. While she lay anchored there, Storekeeper 3rd Class L. E. Smith, assigned as roving sentry on the port side of the ship, spotted a swimmer in the water at 01:00 on 15 June 1969. Since VC sappers were known to have been active in that area, Storekeeper Smith promptly opened fire. Within a short time, the water around the ship was thoroughly grenaded. Later that morning, a Vietnamese body that had been shot was found floating nearby. For his prompt action, Storekeeper Smith received the recommendation for the Navy Commendation Medal for "effectively thwarting an attempt to mine the ship."

Three days later, rocket fire landed within 50 yards (46 m) of the ship at 14:05 on 18 June 1969. Unable to return the fire because of the presence of friendly forces in the area, Whitfield County shifted her anchorage to avoid being hit. Later that afternoon, the riverine force shifted its anchorage back to Mỹ Tho.

Whitfield County was relieved by landing ship tank USS Tom Green County on 4 July 1969. Between 8 May 1969 and 4 July 1969, Whitfield County had expended some 2,982 rounds of 3-inch (76.2-millimeter) projectiles on call-fire and counterbattery fire, conducted some 850 helicopter landings, and travelled 394 nautical miles (730 km; 453 mi) within the Mekong Delta. She had also witnessed the gradual turnover of all River Assault Flotilla 1 assets to the Republic of Vietnam Navy, the beginning of the redeployment of the 9th Infantry Division from the Mekong Delta, and the gradual disbanding of Task Force 117. When she sailed on 5 July 1969, she left the Mekong Delta region for the last time.

Returning to Yokosuka via Keelung, Taiwan, Whitfield County soon commenced a badly needed overhaul, one that lasted into the autumn of 1969. For the remainder of the 1969, she operated locally in Japanese waters.

=== 1970–1972 ===
Until 1972, Whitfield County worked out of Yokosuka, touching occasionally at Okinawa in the course of amphibious maneuvers and exercises and at Subic Bay in the Philippines. She served three tours with Amphibious Ready Group Bravo in 1970.

During 1971, Whitfield County served two tours as support landing ship tank for Operation Market Time interdiction operations out of Vũng Tàu. A highlight of her 1971 operations were her support activities for stores ship Regulus, which had been forced aground on the rocks in the western harbor of Hong Kong when Typhoon Rose struck China on 16 August 1971; Whitfield County provided berthing and messing facilities for Regulus's crew.

Whitfield County served one tour with Amphibious Ready Group Alfa and one with Operation Market Time forces in 1972.

== Decommissioning and Greek service ==
Whitfield County arrived at Yokosuka on 23 December 1972 after exercising with U.S. Marine Corps units at Okinawa. She remained there until she was decommissioned on 15 March 1973. She was stricken from the Navy List on 15 August 1976.

Whitfield County was sold to Greece on 1 March 1977 under the Security Assistance Program. Commissioned into the Hellenic Navy, she was renamed Kos (L116). Kos had a long career, not being decommissioned until 1 June 2000.

Kos was sunk as a target on 24 June 2004 during the Hellenic Navy exercise Thiela III by Penguin missiles fired by the Greek fast attack craft missile (FACMs) Ypoploiarchos Degiannis and Simeoforos Starakis and torpedoes from the Greek torpedo boats Lailaps and Typhon.

== Awards ==
Whitfield County performed services of signal importance during the Vietnam War, services that were important but, due to their nature, largely unsung in the public eye. Nonetheless, she was awarded the Presidential Unit Citation for her operations with Task Force 117 from 8 May 1969 to 5 July 1969, three Navy Unit Commendations, three Meritorious Unit Commendations, and 11 battle stars. The battle stars were for:

- Vietnam Defense 4 July 1965, 6 July 1965 – 14 July 1965, 14 August 1965 – 19 August 1965, 3 September 1965 – 12 September 1965, 12 November 1965 – 16 November 1965, and 2 December 1965 – 10 December 1965
- Vietnamese Counteroffensive 4 January 1966 – 6 January 1966, 18 January 1966 – 4 February 1966, 20 February 1966 – 7 March 1966, and 25 March 1966 – 27 March 1966
- Vietnamese Counteroffensive Phase II 5 September 1966 – 7 September 1966, 24 September 1966 – 28 September 1966, 11 October 1966 – 14 October 1966, 29 November 1966 – 6 December 1966 7 January 1967 – 27 February 1967, 15 April 1967 – 24 April 1967 and 29 April 1967 – 31 May 1967
- Vietnamese Counteroffensive Phase III 1 June 1967 – 3 June 1967, 17 August 1967 – 29 October 1967, and 28 November 1967 – 13 December 1967
- Tet Counteroffensive 30 January 1968 – 17 February 1968 and 1 March 1968 – 13 March 1968
- Vietnamese Counteroffensive Phase IV 11 May 1968 – 13 May 1968
- Vietnamese Counteroffensive Phase V 15 July 1968 – 23 September 1968 and 5 October 1968 – 9 October 1968
- Vietnam Winter–Spring 1970 30 November 1968 – 4 February 1969, 6 May 1969 – 6 July 1969, and 8 February 1970 – 10 February 1970
- Vietnamese Counteroffensive Phase VII 28 December 1970 – 2 January 1971 and 7 May 1971 – 25 June 1971
- Consolidation II 1 January 1972 – 29 January 1972
- Vietnam Ceasefire 8 July 1972 – 1 August 1972 and 8 August 1972 – 17 September 1972
