= Benewah-class barracks ship =

Class of United States Navy barrack ships

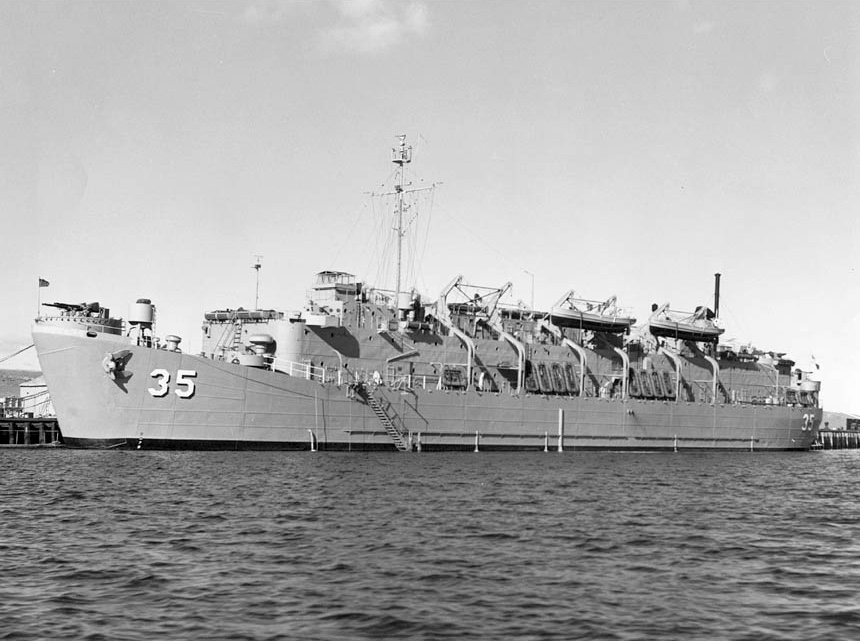
- USS Benewah

Class overview
- Name: Benewah class
- Builders: Boston Navy Yard; Missouri Valley Bridge & Iron Co.; American Bridge and Iron Co.; Jeffersonville Bridge & Machine Co.; Bethlehem Hingham Shipyard
- Operators: United States Navy; Indonesian Navy; Philippine Navy
- Built: 1943-1946
- In commission: 1944-1971
- Planned: 16
- Completed: 16
- Active: 2, military service; 2, commercial service
- Laid up: 1
- Retired: 13

General characteristics
- Type: Barracks ship
- Displacement: 4,000 long tons (4,064 t)
- Length: 328 ft (100 m) oa
- Beam: 50 ft (15 m)
- Draft: Full load: 8 ft 2 in (2.49 m) forward; 14 ft 1 in (4.29 m) aft; Landing at 2,160 t: 3 ft 11 in (1.19 m) forward; 9 ft 10 in (3.00 m) aft
- Installed power: 2 × 900 hp (670 kW) Electro-Motive Diesel 12-567A diesel engines; 1,700 shp (1,300 kW)
- Propulsion: 1 × Falk main reduction gears; 2 × Propellers
- Speed: 12 kn (22 km/h; 14 mph)
- Range: 24,000 nmi (44,000 km; 28,000 mi) at 9 kn (17 km/h; 10 mph) while displacing 3,960 long tons (4,024 t)
- Boats & landing craft carried: 2 or 6 x LCVPs
- Capacity: 2,975 Bbls (diesel)
- Troops: 26 officers, 1200 enlisted men
- Complement: 12 officers, 129 enlisted men
- Armament: 2 × quad Bofors 40 mm guns; 20 × 50 cal and 30 cal machine guns

The Benewah-class barracks ship was a class of barracks ships of the United States Navy after the Second World War, in the late 1940s.

== Development ==
Thirteen ships were converted into repair ships throughout the later stages of World War II. The ships were converted from the LST-1 and LST-542 classes. After the war, a few ships were then sold to the Philippines and Indonesia.

The ship's hulls remained nearly the same but with new equipment to carry out their purpose were placed on deck alongside several cranes. The ships' armament was slightly changed and relocated to make way for the ships' equipment. All ships served in the Pacific Theater until the end of the war with no ships lost in combat.

APL-40 (ex-USS Nueces) is still active, serving as a transport and berthing vessel for the United States Navy in Yokosuka. APL-39 (ex-USS Mercer) also now berthed in Sasebo.

== Ships of class ==
Benewah-class repair ship
Pennant number	Name	Callsign	Builders	Launched	Commissioned	Decommissioned	Fate
APB-35	Benewah	NUIX	Boston Navy Yard	6 May 1945	9 March 1946	26 February 1971	Sold to Philippines and renamed RPS Tulungan (AH-3), sunk as artificial reef in 1975
APB-36	Colleton	NUIN	Boston Navy Yard	30 July 1945	28 January 1967	15 December 1969	Scrapped on 6 January 1973
APB-37	Echols	NUIZ	Boston Navy Yard	30 July 1945	n/a		Sold to Defense Reutilization and Marketing Service (DRMS), in active service since mid-2000s
APB-38	Marlboro	-	Boston Navy Yard	17 November 1944	18 August 1945	5 May 1947	Scrapped
APB-39	Mercer	NUIQ	Boston Navy Yard	17 November 1944	19 September 1945	7 January 1970	Part of the CincPacFlt Berthing and Messing Program and is berthed at Sasebo, Japan
APB-40	Nueces	NUIR	Boston Navy Yard	6 May 1945	30 November 1945	13 March 1970	Part of the CincPacFlt Berthing and Messing Program and is berthed at Yokosuka, Japan
APB-41	Wythe	NEWW	Missouri Valley Bridge & Iron Co.	9 June 1944	30 June 1944	29 May 1947	Scrapped on 10 September 1959
APB-42	Yavapai	NFKT	American Bridge & Machine Co.	6 June 1944	30 June 1944	3 December 1946	Scrapped on 11 September 1959
APB-43	Yolo	NFLE	American Bridge & Machine Co.	16 June 1944	3 July 1944	9 August 1946	Scrapped on 6 February 1960
APB-44	Presque Isle	NFLK	American Bridge & Machine Co.	16 June 1944	19 July 1944	18 April 1947	Sold to Indonesia and renamed KRI Teluk Ratai (LST-509), decommissioned and laid up
APB-45	Blackford	NBCK	Missouri Valley Bridge & Iron Co.	9 April 1945	9 June 1945	26 April 1947	Sold to merchant service, sunk as artificial reef between 1968 and 1970
APB-46	Dorchester	NBCY	Missouri Valley Bridge & Iron Co.	12 April 1945	15 June 1945	16 October 1946	Sold to merchant service, in active service since 1 August 1974
APB-47	Kingman	NBDB	Missouri Valley Bridge & Iron Co.	17 April 1945	17 April 1945	15 January 1947	Scrapped on 19 November 1980
APB-48	Vanderburgh	NBFT	Missouri Valley Bridge & Iron Co.	20 April 1945	3 July 1945	17 January 1947	Scrapped on 12 November 1972
APB-49	Accomac	NFRR	Jeffersonville Boat & Machine Co.	28 June 1944	24 July 1944	9 August 1946	Scrapped on 7 December 1959
APB-50	Cameron	NKBB	Bethlehem Hingham Shipyard	5 July 1944	30 July 1944	13 December 1946	Sold to merchant service, fate unknown
