= Greek ship Kos =

At least two ships of the Hellenic Navy have borne the name Kos (Greek: Κως), after the Greek island of Kos:

- Greek minesweeper Kos (M212) was the ex-British BYMS-class minesweeper HMS BYMS 2191, transferred to Greek service in 1943 and sunk in 1944
- Greek landing ship Kos (L116) a Terrebonne Parish-class tank landing ship launched in 1953 as USS LST-1169 and renamed USS Whitfield County in 1955. She was transferred to Greece in 1977 and renamed Kos. She was stricken in 2000 and sunk as a target in 2004.
