= USS APL-31 =

Barracks ship of the United States Navy

Coordinates: 40.1100000°N 73.6916667°W

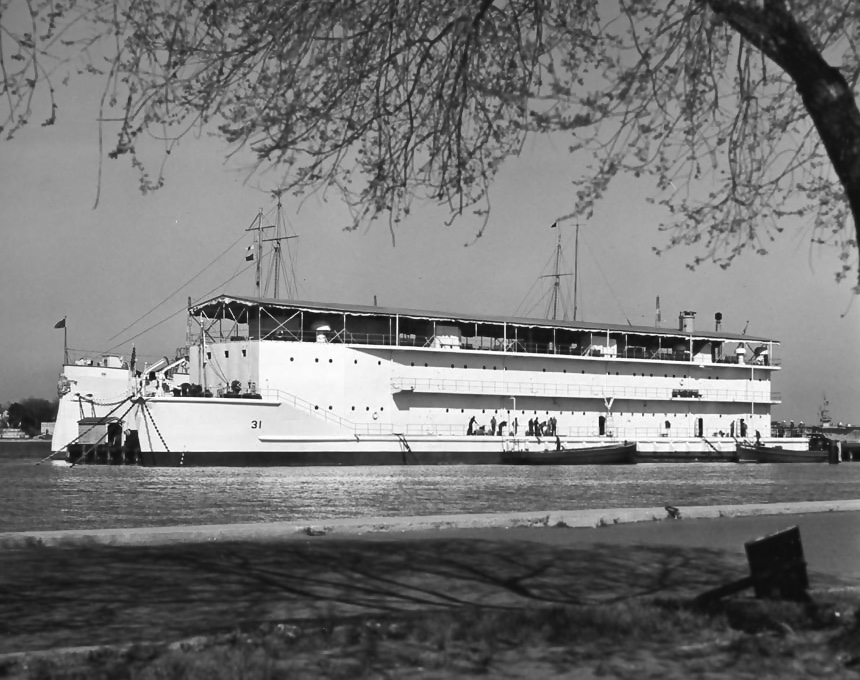
- APL-31

History

United States
- Name: APL-31
- Ordered: April 1944
- Builder: Everett-Pacific Shipbuilding & Dry Dock Co.
- Laid down: 1 June 1944
- Launched: 30 September 1944
- Commissioned: 14 June 1945
- Stricken: 1 August 2000
- Identification: Hull number: APL-31
- Honours and awards: See Awards
- Fate: Sunk as artificial reef, 23 July 2001

General characteristics
- Class & type: APL-17-class barracks ship
- Displacement: 1,300 t (1,279 long tons) (standard); 2,660 t (2,618 long tons) (full load)
- Length: 260 ft 0 in (79.25 m)
- Beam: 49 ft 2 in (14.99 m)
- Draft: 8 ft 6 in (2.59 m)
- Installed power: 100kW 450 AC
- Propulsion: 3 × Diesel generators
- Capacity: 0 officers; 583 enlisted; 1,000 Bbls (Diesel)
- Complement: 6 officers; 66 enlisted

USS APL-31 is an APL-17-class barracks ship of the United States Navy.

== Construction and career ==
The ship was laid down on 1 June 1944, by the Everett-Pacific Shipbuilding & Dry Dock Co. and launched on 30 September 1944. She was commissioned on 14 June 1945.

In April 1948, she was acquired by the United States Naval Academy.

The ship was towed out to sea and later sunk as an artificial reef on 23 July 2001. The wreck is now a scuba diving destination off the New Jersey coast.

== Awards ==
- American Campaign Medal
- World War II Victory Medal
- National Defense Service Medal
