= USS APL-18 =

Barracks ship of the United States Navy

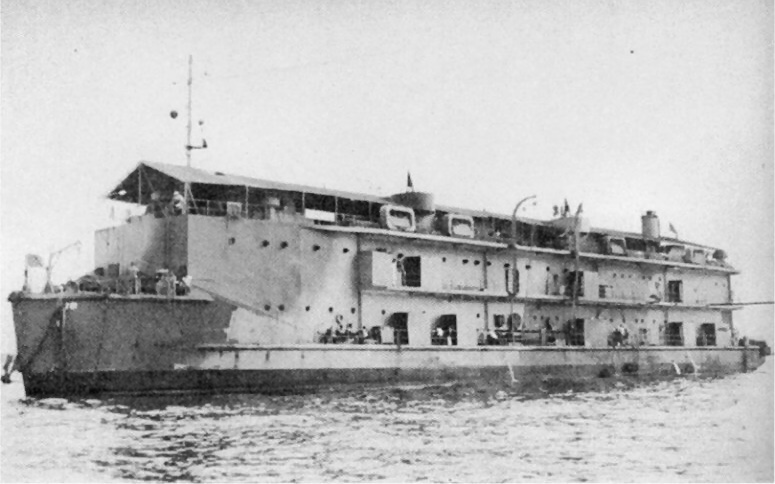
- USS APL-18

History

United States
- Name: APL-18
- Ordered: 9 November 1943
- Builder: Tampa Shipbuilding Co.
- Laid down: 29 October 1943
- Launched: 29 January 1944
- Commissioned: 29 September 1944
- Decommissioned: January 1947
- Renamed: from YF-629, 1943
- Home port: San Diego
- Identification: Hull number: APL-18
- Status: Berthed in San Diego

General characteristics
- Class & type: APL-17-class barracks ship
- Displacement: 1,300 t (1,279 long tons) (standard); 2,660 t (2,618 long tons) (full load)
- Length: 260 ft 0 in (79.25 m)
- Beam: 49 ft 2 in (14.99 m)
- Draft: 8 ft 6 in (2.59 m)
- Installed power: 100kW 450 AC
- Propulsion: 3 × Diesel generators
- Capacity: 0 officers; 583 enlisted; 1,000 Bbls (Diesel)
- Complement: 6 officers; 66 enlisted

USS APL-18 is an APL-2-class barracks ship of the United States Navy.

== Construction and career ==
The ship was laid down on 29 October 1943, by the Tampa Shipbuilding Co. and launched on 29 January 1944. She was commissioned on 29 September 1944.

She was decommissioned and put into the reserve fleet by January 1947.

The ship undertook the CincPacFlt Berthing and Messing Program, in which she is berthed in San Diego since at least the early 2000s. She is being used as a berthing and messing barge.
