= USS Blackford =

20th-century barracks ship

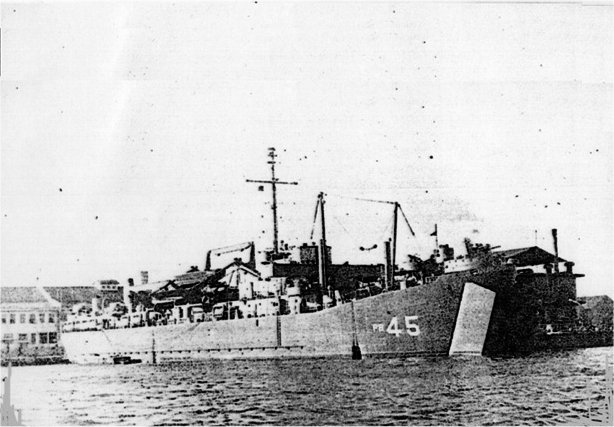
- USS Blackford

History

United States
- Name: Blackford
- Namesake: Blackford County, Indiana
- Builder: Missouri Valley Bridge and Iron Co.
- Laid down: 2 January 1945
- Launched: 9 April 1945
- Commissioned: 9 July 1945
- Decommissioned: 26 April 1947
- Stricken: 1 April 1960
- Identification: APB-45
- Fate: Sunk as a target by South African military 1968-70
- Notes: Ship International Radio Callsign: NBCK

General characteristics
- Class & type: Benewah-class barracks ship
- Displacement: 4,000 tons
- Length: 328 ft (100 m)
- Beam: 50 ft (15 m)
- Draft: 11 ft 2 in (3.40 m)
- Propulsion: 2 × General Motors 12-567A diesel engines
- Speed: 12 knots (22 km/h; 14 mph)
- Complement: 12 Officers, 125 Enlisted (Crew); 28 Officers, 275 Enlisted (Troop Complement)
- Armament: 2 × quad 40 mm AA guns; 20 × 0.5 in (12.7 mm) and 0.3 in (7.6 mm) cal machine guns

USS Blackford (APB-45) was a Benewah-class self-propelled barracks ship that was in service with the United States Navy during the waning days of World War II. She was decommissioned in April 1947 and sold for merchant service. In c. 1968–1970, she was sunk as a target by the South African Military.

== Ship history ==
Authorized as LST-1111, she was redesignated as General Issue Stores Ship Blackford AKS-16 on 8 December 1944. On 2 January 1945, her keel was laid down at Missouri Valley Bridge and Iron Co., and on 6 March 1945 she was once more redesignated, this time as Self-Propelled Barracks Ship Blackford APB-45. She launched on 9 April 1945 and was commissioned 9 July 1945 at Navy Supply Depot, New Orleans.

During the war, Blackford served the U.S. Navy in the Asiatic-Pacific Theatre of Operations.Arriving at Pearl Harbor on 19 August 1945, she joined the 3rd Amphibious Force. On 5 October 1945, she was assigned with Occupation Duty for 25 days up to 30 October 1945. During the next eight months she served at Eniwetok, Ulithi, Leyte, and Tokyo Bay as a floating barracks. She departed Yokosuka, Japan, 7 April and arrived at New Orleans 14 May 1946. Moving to Orange, Texas, 10 June, she went out of commission in reserve there 26 April 1947.

=== Post-military service ===
After 13 years of being laid up in the Atlantic Reserve Fleet, she was struck from the Naval Register on 1 April 1960. 3 years later, in 1963, she was purchased by Collins Submarine Pipeline. She would serve this merchant role until 1968–1970, when she was sunk as a target by the South African military.

== Ship awards ==
- World War II Victory Medal
- American Campaign Medal
- Philippines Liberation Medal
- Navy Occupation Service Medal (With Asia Clasp)
- Asiatic-Pacific Campaign Medal
