= USS Echols =

Barracks ship of the United States Navy

Coordinates: 40.641925°N 74.166316°W

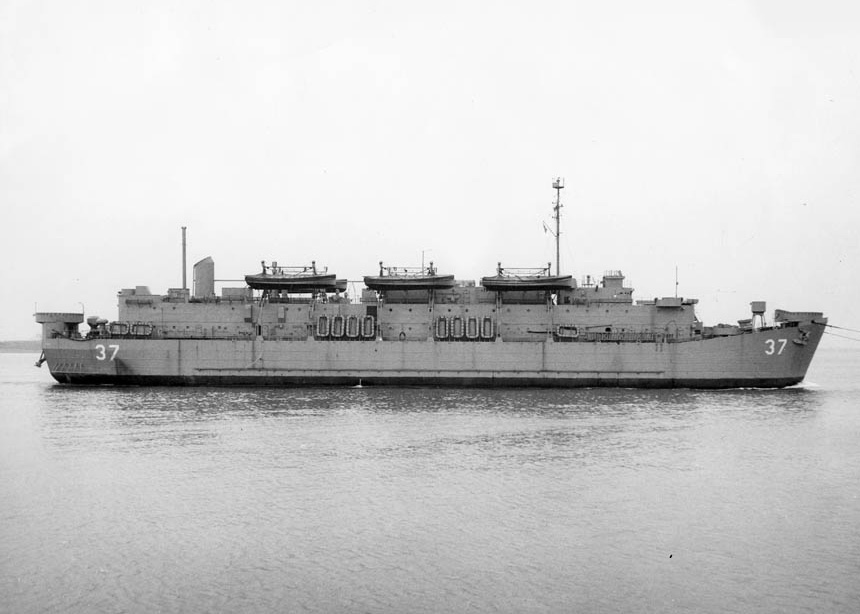
- USS Echols

History

United States
- Name: Echols
- Namesake: Echols
- Awarded: 8 July 1943
- Builder: Boston Navy Yard
- Laid down: 11 August 1944
- Launched: 30 July 1945
- Sponsored by: Mrs. Dorothy O'Brien
- Acquired: 1 January 1947
- Commissioned: January 1947
- Decommissioned: 30 September 1955
- Reclassified: APB-37, 1944; IX-504, 1971
- Stricken: 22 December 1995
- Home port: New London
- Identification: Callsign: NUIZ; Hull number: APL-37
- Fate: Sold to Clean Waters of New York, 12 June 2003

General characteristics
- Class & type: Benewah-class barracks ship
- Displacement: 2,190 long tons (2,225 t) (standard); 4,080 long tons (4,145 t) (full load)
- Length: 328 ft 0 in (99.97 m)
- Beam: 50 ft 0 in (15.24 m)
- Draft: 11 ft 2 in (3.40 m)
- Propulsion: 2 × General Motors 12-567A Diesel engines; double Falk Main Reduction Gears; 5 × Diesel-drive 100kW 120V/240V D.C. Ship's Service Generators; 2 × propellers, 1,800shp; twin rudders
- Speed: 12 knots (22 km/h; 14 mph)
- Capacity: 26 officers; 1,200 enlisted; 2,975 Bbls (Diesel)
- Complement: 12 officers; 129 enlisted
- Armament: 2 × 3 in (76 mm) guns; 2 × quad Bofors 40 mm guns; 20 × 0.5 in (12.7 mm) and .30 cal machine guns

USS Echols (APB-37) is a Benewah-class barracks ship of the United States Navy.

== Construction and career ==
The ship was laid down on 11 August 1944, by the Boston Navy Yard and launched on 30 July 1945, sponsored by Miss Dorothy O'Brien. She was commissioned in January 1947.

The ship was put into the inactive in commissioned status as Echols (APB-37) at Atlantic Reserve Fleet, 6th Naval District from January 1947 until 1961, where she was to Norfolk. Echols was later towed to Groton to accommodate submarine crews at the Naval Submarine Base New London.

In 1971, she was re-designated as IX-504.

On 22 December 1955, Echols was struck from the Naval Register.

The ship was sold by Defense Reutilization and Marketing Service, on 12 January 2003. Between April 2005 and August 2006, the ship was sold to Clean Waters of New York and has been in used since then as an indoor shop and floating office.
