= USS APL-24 =

Barracks ship of the United States Navy

Coordinates: 38.0773780°N 122.0977358°W

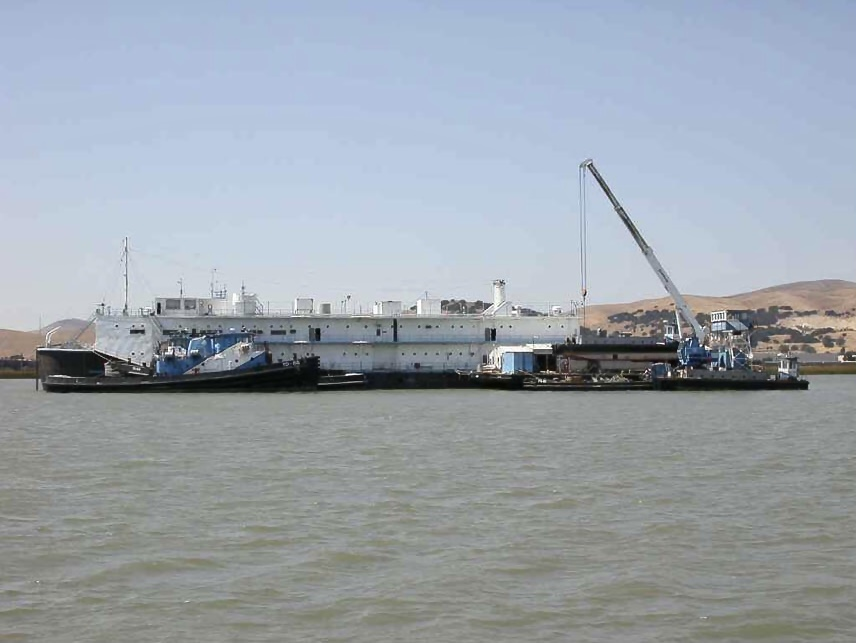
- FB-62

History

United States
- Name: APL-24
- Ordered: 29 January 1944
- Builder: Pollock-Stockton Shipbuilding Co.
- Laid down: 24 July 1944
- Launched: 26 September 1944
- Commissioned: 24 July 1945
- Decommissioned: 24 March 1947
- Stricken: 1 April 1962
- Identification: Hull number: APL-24
- Honors and awards: See Awards
- Status: Transferred to MARAD, 23 May 1962

General characteristics
- Class & type: APL-17-class barracks ship
- Displacement: 1,300 t (1,279 long tons) (standard); 2,660 t (2,618 long tons) (full load)
- Length: 260 ft 0 in (79.25 m)
- Beam: 49 ft 2 in (14.99 m)
- Draft: 8 ft 6 in (2.59 m)
- Installed power: 100kW 450 AC
- Propulsion: 3 × Diesel generators
- Capacity: 0 officers; 583 enlisted; 1,000 Bbls (Diesel)
- Complement: 6 officers; 66 enlisted

USS APL-24 is an APL-17-class barracks ship of the United States Navy.

== Construction and career ==
The ship was laid down on 24 July 1944, by the Pollock-Stockton Shipbuilding Co. and launched on 26 September 1944. She was commissioned on 24 July 1945.

She was decommissioned on 24 March 1947 and put into the reserve fleet.

The ship was transferred to MARAD on 23 May 1962, renamed as FB-62 and used as a headquarter ship in Suisun Bay, California.

== Awards ==
- American Campaign Medal
- World War II Victory Medal
