= USS Dorchester (APB-46) =

World War II barracks ship

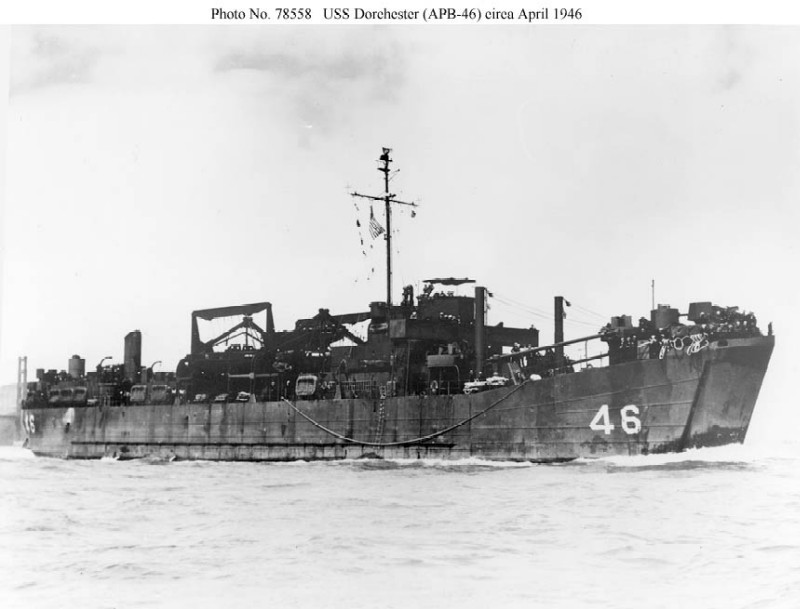
- USS Dorchester (APB-46) probably returning to San Francisco from the Western Pacific on 9 April 1946.

History

United States
- Name: USS Dorchester
- Namesake: Dorchester County, Maryland and Dorchester County, South Carolina
- Builder: Missouri Valley Bridge and Iron Company, Evansville, Indiana
- Launched: 12 April 1945
- Commissioned: 15 June 1945
- Decommissioned: 16 October 1946
- Reclassified: AKS-17 (General Stores Issue Ship), 8 December 1944; APB-46 (Self-propelled Barracks Ship), 1944
- Stricken: 1 June 1973
- Identification: IMO number: 8133059; MMSI number: 366808000; Callsign: WTH4389
- Fate: Sold for conversion to a fish processing vessel, 1 August 1974

General characteristics
- Class & type: LST-542-class tank landing ship
- Displacement: 2,189 long tons (2,224 t)
- Length: 328 ft (100 m)
- Beam: 50 ft (15 m)
- Draft: 11 ft 2 in (3.40 m)
- Propulsion: 2 General Motors 12-567 diesel engines, two shafts, twin rudders
- Speed: 12 knots (22 km/h; 14 mph)
- Capacity: 990 troops
- Complement: 151 officers and men
- Armament: 2 × quad 40 mm guns

USS Dorchester (APB-46), was a Benewah-class barracks ship. Her hull classification symbol was initially to be LST-1112. She was first redesignated a General Stores Issue Ship (AKS-17) on 8 December 1944, then as a Self-propelled Barracks Ship (APB-46). Her keel was laid down by Missouri Valley Bridge and Iron Company of Evansville, Indiana. She was launched on 12 April 1945 sponsored by Mrs. J.A. Walsh, and commissioned on 15 June 1945.

== Service history ==
Sailing from New Orleans 5 August 1945, Dorchester embarked troops at Pearl Harbor, then sailed to deliver cargo and receive more passengers at Eniwetok and Guam as she made her passage to Japan. On 15 October she reported for service as barracks ship at Wakayama and at Kobe from 11 February 1946 to 4 March. Dorchester then sailed for San Francisco, California, arriving 9 April.

She was placed out of commission in reserve at Vancouver, Washington on 16 October 1946. Dorchester remained in the reserve fleet until she was stricken from the Naval Vessel Register on 1 June 1973. She was sold on 1 August 1974 for conversion to commercial service. She was converted to a fish processing vessel under the name Pacific Pride. By 2002, she was owned by Trident Seafoods of Seattle, Washington, and was operating under the name Alaska Packer. She is still on their fleet listing as of February 2008.
