= USS Orvetta (IX-157) =

U.S. World War II auxiliary ship

- USS Orvetta

History

United States
- Name: USS Orvetta
- Builder: Oscar Daniels Company; Tampa, Florida
- Yard number: 9
- Laid down: 12 June 1919 as Tampa
- Completed: February 1920
- Acquired: 4 April 1944
- Commissioned: 7 June 1944
- Decommissioned: End of 1946
- Stricken: 10 June 1947
- Fate: Sold for scrap, 1949

General characteristics
- Type: Design 1027 ship
- Displacement: 12,940 long tons (13,148 t) full
- Length: 418 ft (127 m)
- Beam: 54 ft (16 m)
- Draft: 28 ft (8.5 m)
- Speed: 9.5 knots (17.6 km/h; 10.9 mph)
- Armament: 1 × 3"/50 caliber gun; 1 × 40 mm gun

USS Orvetta (IX–157) was built for the US Shipping Board as Tampa in 1920 by the Oscar Daniels Co., Tampa, Fla. and acquired by the United States Navy on a bareboat charter from the Maritime Commission 4 April 1944. She was renamed Orvetta and converted for military service as a barracks ship by the Matson Navigation Co., San Francisco; and commissioned 7 June 1944.

By 18 June Orvetta had reported for duty with Service Force, Pacific. She operated first with ServRon 8, headquartered at Pearl Harbor. Then, as the war moved west and north from the south Pacific, she shifted to ServRon 10 to provide housing facilities at advanced bases. By the end of the war she was in the Philippines, anchored in San Pedro Bay.

Following the signing of the official surrender documents, Orvetta steamed north to Okinawa, thence to Shanghai, arriving 30 September. She remained at Shanghai until 10 May 1946 when she was taken in tow by USS Serrano for return to the Philippines. Arriving at Subic Bay 18 May she continued to serve as, a barrack ship until decommissioned at the end of the year.

Struck from the Naval Register 10 June 1947, she was returned to the Maritime Commission, at Subic, 26 January 1948. Four months later she departed for the United States and was sold for scrap in early 1949.
