= USS Yolo =

1944 Benewah-class barracks ship

History

United States
- Name: USS Yolo
- Namesake: Yolo County, California
- Builder: American Bridge Company
- Laid down: 25 April 1944
- Launched: 16 June 1944
- Commissioned: 3 July 1944
- Decommissioned: 9 August 1946
- Identification: IMO number: 6721618
- Honors and awards: One battle star for World War II Service.
- Fate: Scrapped 1960

General characteristics
- Length: 328 feet
- Beam: 50 feet
- Draft: 11 feet, 2 inches
- Propulsion: two General Motors 12-567A Diesel engines; five Diesel-drive 100 kW 120 V D.C. Ship's Service Generators
- Complement: 10 Officers, 141 Enlisted, 340 troops
- Armament: four single 40 mm AA gun mounts; two twin 40 mm AA gun mounts; twenty .50 and .30 cal machine guns

USS Yolo (APB-43) was a Benewah-class self-propelled barracks ship of the United States Navy that served in the later years of World War II, and briefly post-war. She was struck in 1959, and scrapped in 1960.

== World War II ==
Yolo was laid down on 25 April 1944 as LST-677 at Ambridge, Pennsylvania, by the American Bridge & Iron Co. She was launched on 16 June 1944, sponsored by Mrs. Lee S. Kreeger and subsequently ferried down the Mississippi River to New Orleans, Louisiana, where she was commissioned on 3 July 1944.

LST-677 conducted her shakedown training out of Panama City, Florida, and then loaded Naval Construction Battalion equipment at Gulfport, Mississippi, before embarking men of the staff of LST Flotilla 6 for transport to combat staging areas. She put to sea from New Orleans on the morning of 8 August 1944, with a convoy bound for the Republic of Cuba, and then proceeded by way of the Panama Canal and San Diego to the Hawaiian Islands. Yolo reached Pearl Harbor on 19 September and, in the ensuing weeks, conducted amphibious warfare exercises at Maui with US Army amphibious teams and their embarked tracked landing vehicles. That duty came to an end on 19 October 1944 when she moored at the amphibious repair dock at Waipio, Pearl Harbor, for conversion to a highly specialized type of support ship for amphibious operations.

LST-677's conversion to a landing craft tender, or self-propelled barracks ship, was completed by 21 January 1945. The ship, reclassified initially to LST(M)-677, spent the following days taking on 406 tons of fresh, frozen, and dry provisions and embarking 315 officers and men of a boat pool for transportation to the Solomon Islands. She left Hawaii astern on the morning of 2 February with an amphibious task group that carried out battle rehearsals in the Solomons before proceeding by way of the Carolines to Okinawa. During the voyage to the next stop on the island-hopping campaign toward the Japanese home islands, LST(M)-677 was reclassified a self-propelled barracks ship, APB-43, and given the name Yolo, effective on 31 March 1945.

=== Battle of Okinawa ===
Yolo arrived off the island of Okinawa on 1 April 1945, and added to the intense gunfire that drove away Japanese bombers that threatened the formation in which she was steaming. The following day, she opened fire on a Kamikaze plane, joining the other ships nearby in putting up a devastating anti-aircraft barrage. That same day, she became the headquarters ship for the 70th Naval SeaBee Pontoon Barge detachment and commenced tender duties that, in the ensuing weeks, saw her service or provision small craft alongside on 915 occasions.

Yolo dispensed a grand total of 991 tons of issues, including 514 tons of dry provisions and 477 tons of frozen foods; delivered nearly 200,000 gallons of fuel to small craft; handled more than 12,000 communications and brought on board several casualties from shore for emergency treatment while they were waiting to be transferred to hospital ships. Under day and night threat of enemy suicide planes and bombers, she shot down one aircraft, assisted in the downing of three others; and witnessed the destruction of more than 50 enemy planes in the vicinity of her anchorage. Yolo's duties at Okinawa ended on 28 June when she sailed for the Philippines with a convoy of amphibious vessels that reached San Pedro Bay, Leyte, on 3 July 1945.

International radio call sign of USS Yolo
| November | Foxtrot | Lima | Echo |

=== Post-War ===
Upon her arrival, she reported for duty to Service Squadron 10 and was assigned to Service Division 101. On 22 July, she sailed for Subic Bay with fresh provisions for an attack transport and two attack cargo ships. She then embarked a draft of 50 men for passage back to Leyte. With the cessation of hostilities with Japan in mid-August 1945, Yolo became "home" for 235 men of ServDiv 101 awaiting occupation service in Japan. She headed out to sea on 3 September; joined a troop convoy off Batangas, Luzon; and proceeded thence to Tokyo Bay where she anchored on 15 September, less than a fortnight after the formal Japanese surrender. Assigned to the Yokohama area, she provisioned small craft on an emergency basis and provided living quarters for men from various naval units until permanent facilities were established ashore.

=== Fate ===
When Yolo's occupation service in the Far East came to an end, she was routed by way of the Panama Canal to Norfolk, Virginia, where she was decommissioned on 9 August 1946. Assigned to the Norfolk Group of the National Defense Reserve Fleet, Yolo remained in reserve until struck from the Naval Register on 1 May 1959. She was removed from U.S. Navy custody on 5 February 1960 and sold to the J. C. Berkwit Co., of New York City, and subsequently scrapped.

== Ship Awards ==
{{center|

| American Campaign Medal | Asiatic-Pacific Campaign Medal with campaign star | |
| World War II Victory Medal | Navy Occupation Medal | Philippine Liberation Medal |
