= USS Nueces =

Barracks ship of the United States Navy

Coordinates: 35.2886818°N 139.6588163°E

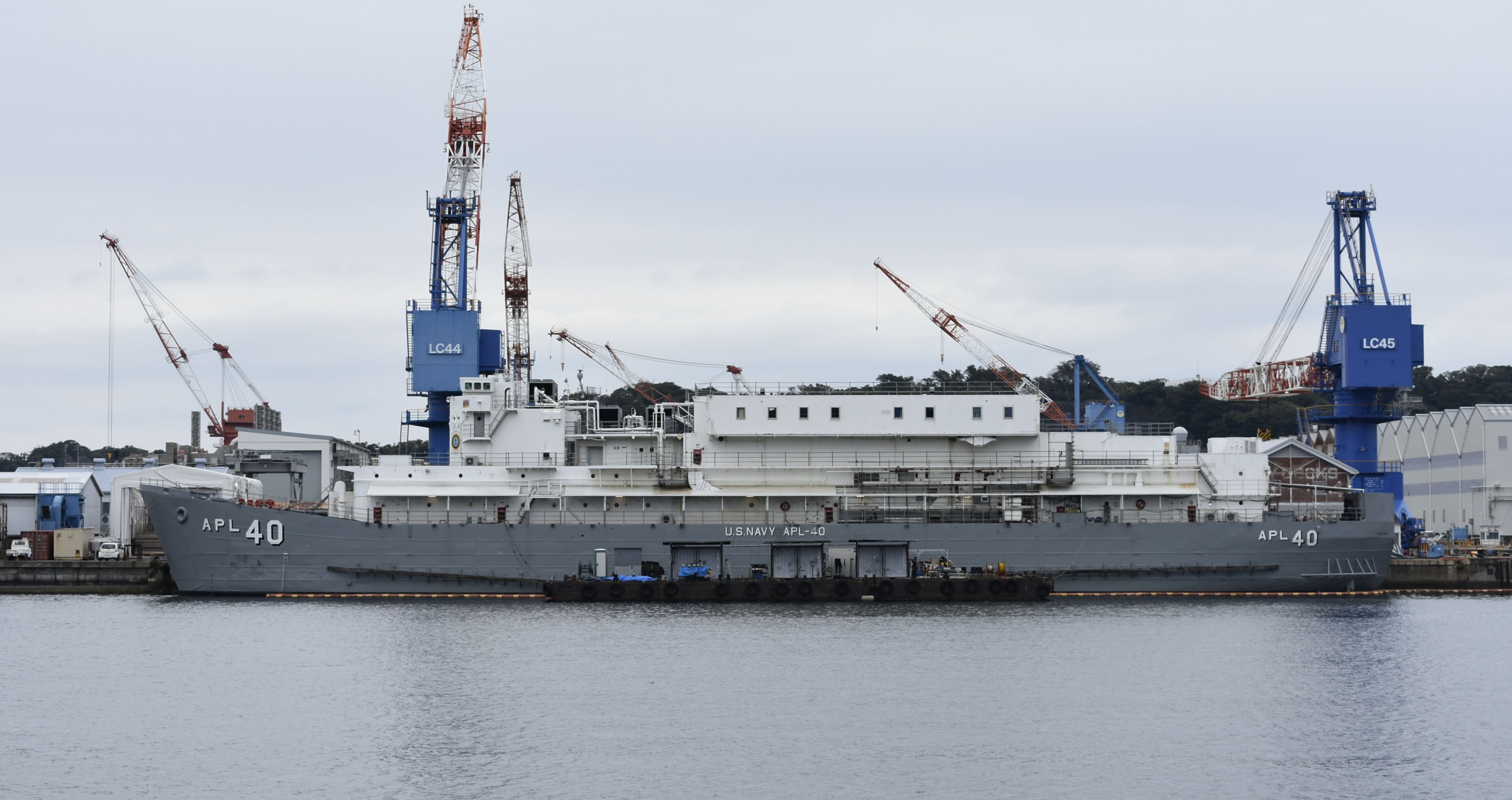
- USS APL-40

History

United States
- Name: Nueces
- Namesake: Nueces
- Builder: Boston Navy Yard
- Laid down: 2 January 1945
- Launched: 6 May 1945
- Sponsored by: Mrs. Dorthy E. Dunnell
- Commissioned: 30 November 1945
- Decommissioned: 30 September 1955
- Recommissioned: 3 May 1968
- Decommissioned: 13 March 1970
- Reclassified: APB-40, 1944; IX-503, 1975; APL-40, 2001
- Home port: Sasebo
- Identification: Callsign: NUIR; Hull number: APL-40
- Honors and awards: See Awards
- Status: in active service

General characteristics
- Class & type: Benewah-class barracks ship
- Displacement: 2,189 t (2,154 long tons) (standard); 4,080 t (4,016 long tons) (full load)
- Length: 328 ft 0 in (99.97 m)
- Beam: 50 ft 0 in (15.24 m)
- Draft: 11 ft 2 in (3.40 m)
- Propulsion: 2 × General Motors 12-567A Diesel engines; double Falk Main Reduction Gears; 5 × Diesel-drive 100kW 120V/240V D.C. Ship's Service Generators; 2 × propellers, 1,800shp; twin rudders
- Speed: 12 knots (22 km/h; 14 mph)
- Capacity: 26 officers; 1,200 enlisted; 2,975 Bbls (Diesel)
- Complement: 12 officers; 129 enlisted
- Armament: 2 × 3 in (76 mm) guns; 2 × quad Bofors 40 mm guns; 20 × 0.5 in (12.7 mm) and .30 cal machine guns

USS Nueces (APB-40) is a Benewah-class barracks ship of the United States Navy. She was notable for her service in the Vietnam War.

== Construction and career ==
The ship was laid down on 2 January 1945, by the Boston Navy Yard and launched on 6 May 1945, sponsored by Miss Dorthy E. Dunnell. She was commissioned on 19 March 1946.

The ship was put into the inactive in commissioned status at Atlantic Reserve Fleet, 6th Naval District from March 1946 until 1947. On 30 September 1955, she was decommissioned and placed in mothball status in Orange, Texas.

Amid the United States involvement in the Vietnam War, she was converted to provide a mobile base for river patrol squadrons of the Mobile Riverine Force Task Force 117. She supported army infantry battalions of the 9th Infantry Division and acted as their command ship. The ship was recommissioned on 3 May 1968 and provided assistance in South Vietnam until August 1969. In late 1968, she sat at Vung Tau near Saigon.

The ship was decommissioned again on 13 March 1970 at Naval Station Long Beach. She was assigned to the Naval Inactive Ship Maintenance Facility, San Diego on 16 April later that year. The ship was assigned to Supervisor of Shipbuilding and berthed at WISCO in Portland, Oregon. On 1 November 1975, Nueces was reclassified as IX-503 and together with USS Mercer were stationed in Sasebo, Japan.

On 3 July 2001, the ship was redesignated as APL-40 and undertook the CincPacFlt Berthing and Messing Program conversion, where she was berthed at Yokosuka. In 2005, she underwent dry docking for repairs. She is being used as a berthing and messing barge in Sasebo. Her boiler and evaporator room has been redesigned into a fitness gym to accommodate the sailors living on board.

== Awards ==
Nueces earned 4 battle stars during the Vietnam War.

- Combat Action Ribbon
- Presidential Unit Citation
- Navy Unit Commendation (2 awards)
- American Campaign Medal
- World War II Victory Medal
- National Defense Service Medal
- Armed Forces Expeditionary Medal (3 awards)
- Vietnam Service Medal (4 battle stars)
- Republic of Vietnam Gallantry Cross Unit Citation (2 awards)
- Republic of Vietnam Campaign Medal
