= USS APL-26 =

Barracks ship of the United States Navy

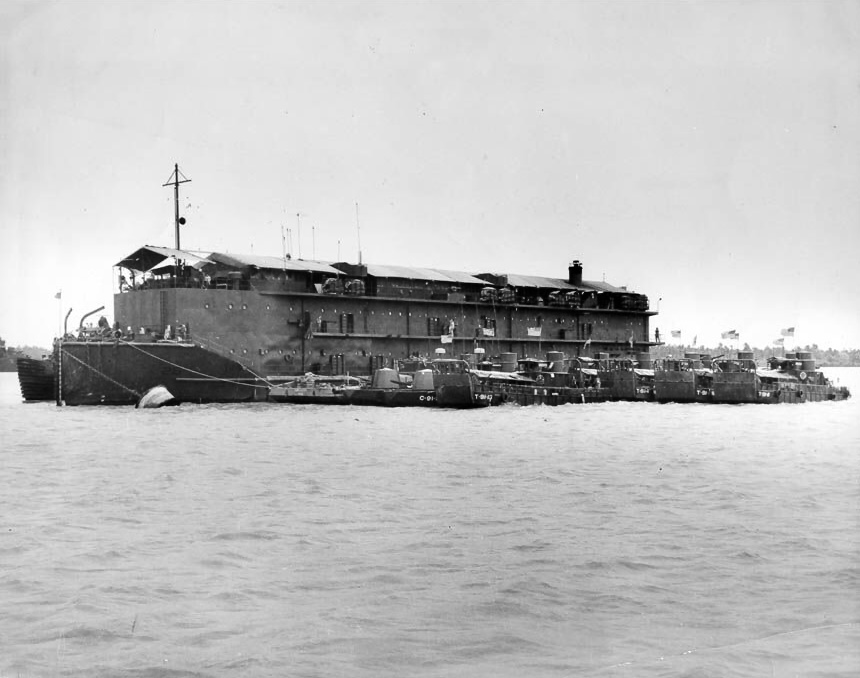
- APL-26

History

United States
- Name: APL-26
- Ordered: 29 January 1944
- Builder: Pollock-Stockton Shipbuilding Co.
- Laid down: 24 July 1944
- Launched: 29 December 1944
- Commissioned: 18 January 1946
- Decommissioned: 1946
- Stricken: 1 November 1971
- Identification: Hull number: APL-26
- Honors and awards: See Awards
- Fate: Transferred to South Vietnam, March 1971

History

South Vietnam
- Name: HQ-9050
- Commissioned: March 1971
- Fate: Captured by North Vietnam, April 1975

History

North Vietnam
- Acquired: April 1975
- Fate: Unknown

General characteristics
- Class & type: APL-17-class barracks ship
- Displacement: 1,300 t (1,279 long tons) (standard); 2,660 t (2,618 long tons) (full load)
- Length: 260 ft 0 in (79.25 m)
- Beam: 49 ft 2 in (14.99 m)
- Draft: 8 ft 6 in (2.59 m)
- Installed power: 100kW 450 AC
- Propulsion: 3 × Diesel generators
- Capacity: 0 officers; 583 enlisted; 1,000 Bbls (Diesel)
- Complement: 6 officers; 66 enlisted

USS APL-26 is an APL-17-class barracks ship of the United States Navy.

== Construction and career ==
The ship was laid down on 24 July 1944, by the Pollock-Stockton Shipbuilding Co. and launched on 29 December 1944. She was commissioned on 18 January 1946.

She was decommissioned in 1946 and put into the reserve fleet.

The ship was then sent to Vietnam by 1967 during the Vietnam War. She took part in several campaigns during the war, from the Tet Offensive until the ending of the war.

In March 1971, the ship was transferred to the South Vietnam and renamed HQ-9050. APL-27 was also transferred with the name HQ-9051.

In April 1975, North Vietnamese troops captured the ship and her fate is unknown.

== Awards ==
- Combat Action Ribbon
- Presidential Unit Citation (2 awards)
- Navy Unit Commendation (3 awards)
- American Campaign Medal
- World War II Victory Medal
- National Defense Service Medal
- Vietnam Service Medal (14 awards)
- Republic of Vietnam Gallantry Cross Unit Citation
- Republic of Vietnam Civil Action Medal (with Palm clasp)
- Republic of Vietnam Campaign Medal
