= USS Colleton =

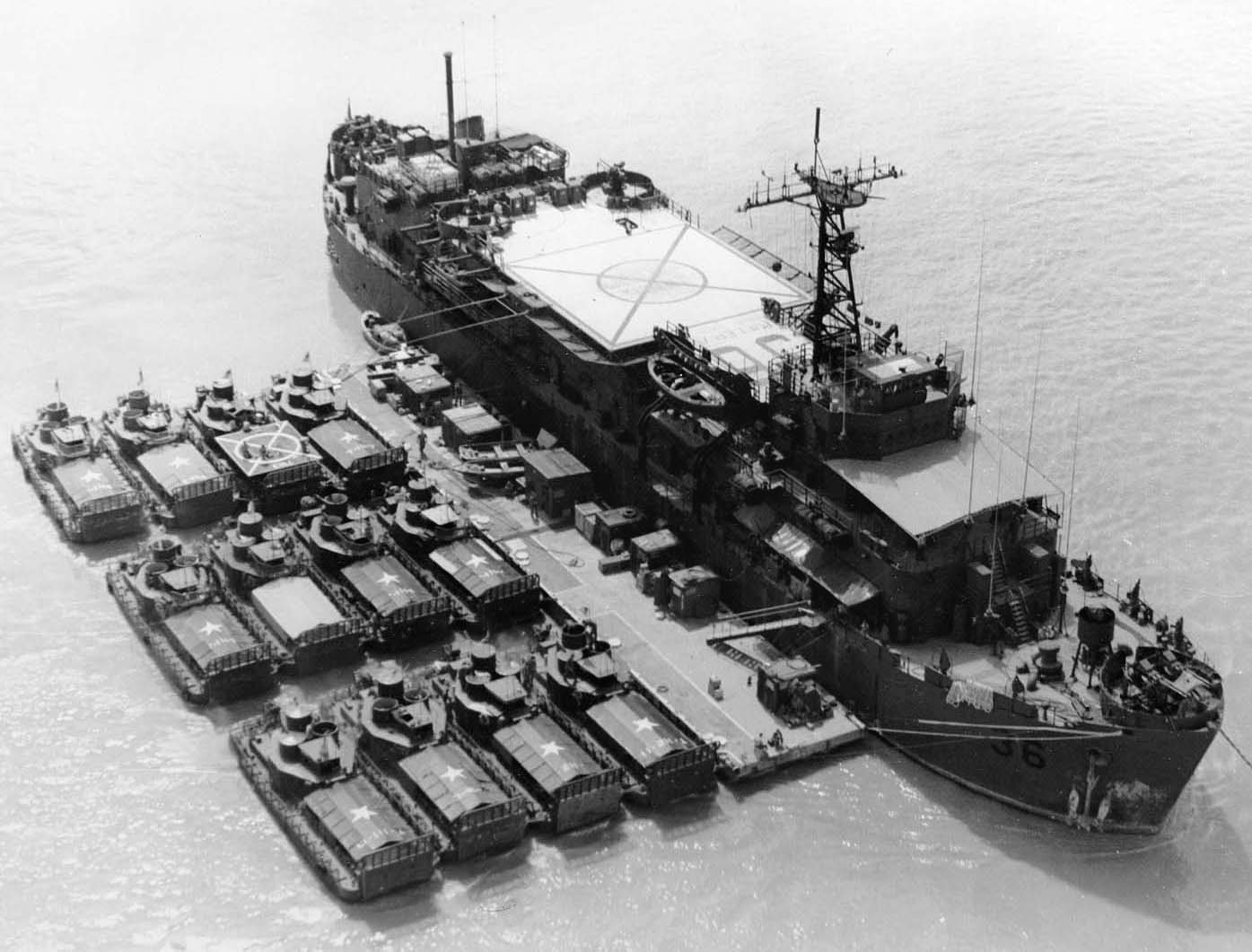
- Colleton with Armoured Troop Carriers in Vietnam, 1968

History

United States
- Name: USS Colleton
- Namesake: Colleton County, South Carolina
- Awarded: 17 December 1943
- Builder: Boston Naval Shipyard
- Laid down: 9 June 1945
- Launched: 30 July 1945
- Acquired: 27 September 1946
- Commissioned: 28 January 1967
- Decommissioned: December 1969
- Stricken: 1 June 1973
- Identification: APB-36
- Honors and awards: Seven battle stars
- Fate: Sold for scrap, 1 August 1974

General characteristics
- Class & type: Benewah-class barracks ship
- Displacement: 2,189 tons (light) 4,080 tons (full)
- Length: 328 ft (100 m)
- Beam: 50 ft (15 m)
- Draft: 11 ft (3.4 m)
- Speed: 12 knots (22 km/h; 14 mph)
- Complement: 193
- Armament: Two 3 in (76 mm) slow fire gun mounts; two quad 40 mm gun mounts; ten 7.62 mm machine guns; eight 0.50 cal machine guns

USS Colleton (APB-36), was a Benewah-class barracks ship. Colleton's keel was laid on 9 June 1945, launched on 30 July 1945 and delivered on 27 September 1946. She was berthed at Boston, Massachusetts in the custody of the United States Maritime Commission.

After extensive conversion beginning in early-mid 1966, which included a helicopter landing pad, she was commissioned 28 January 1967 at the Philadelphia Navy Yard.

Colleton arrived in Vung Tau, Vietnam on 2 May 1967 for duties in the Mekong Delta under Commander River Assault Flotilla One (also known as Task Force 117 (TF117)). Elements of River Assault Squadron Eleven, and the US Army's 4th Battalion, 47th Infantry, 2nd Brigade, 9th Infantry Division embarked on 2 June 1967. During the remainder of the year, operations began taking the Mobile Riverine Force (MRF) further west in the Mekong Delta towards Cambodia, creating longer and delayed aeromedical evacuation support for the assault craft and embarked US Army units of the MRF.

It was determined that the MRF needed a larger medical treatment and patient holding capacity and as a result, Colleton was refitted at U.S. Naval Base Subic Bay, Philippines, in December 1967 and January 1968. The refit expanded the sick bay facilities from one level to two levels and installed a rampway system connecting the levels. (Levels are "decks" above the main deck.) The O-3 level was the helicopter deck and litter storage (port side aft of the helo deck). The O-2 level, connected to the helo deck by a ramp, contained a 6-litter triage, X-ray, blood bank and autoclave. Casualties could also be brought onboard using a hoist for patient transfers from small craft. Another ramp lead from the O-2 level to the O-1 level that contained a two-tabled operating room, recovery rooms, medical supply and storage, 18 bed ward, pharmacy and single chair dental clinic. Arriving in South Vietnam just days before the Tet Offensive, Colleton handled 890 combat casualties from 29 January 1968 – May 1968, admitted 134 patients to the ship's ward, and evacuated 411 after providing emergency life-saving treatment and stabilization.

Although there were four APB's assigned to the MRF, only Colleton was refitted to provide expanded medical treatment and holding capability. Although her medical staff did not consist of a full-time surgeon, Colleton served in conjunction with other hospital ships serving further off coast including USS Repose and USS Sanctuary.

Colleton was decommissioned December 1969 in Bremerton, Washington, stricken from the Naval Vessel Register 1 June 1973, and sold to American Ship Dismantlers, of Portland, Oregon for $172,226.62 on 1 August 1974.

== Ship awards ==

Combat Action Ribbon	Navy Presidential Unit Citation (2)	
Navy Unit Commendation (2)	National Defense Service Medal	Vietnam Service Medal (8)
Vietnam Gallantry Cross	Vietnam Civil Actions Unit Citation	Republic of Vietnam Campaign Medal
