= USS LST-928 =

1944 LST-542-class tank landing ship

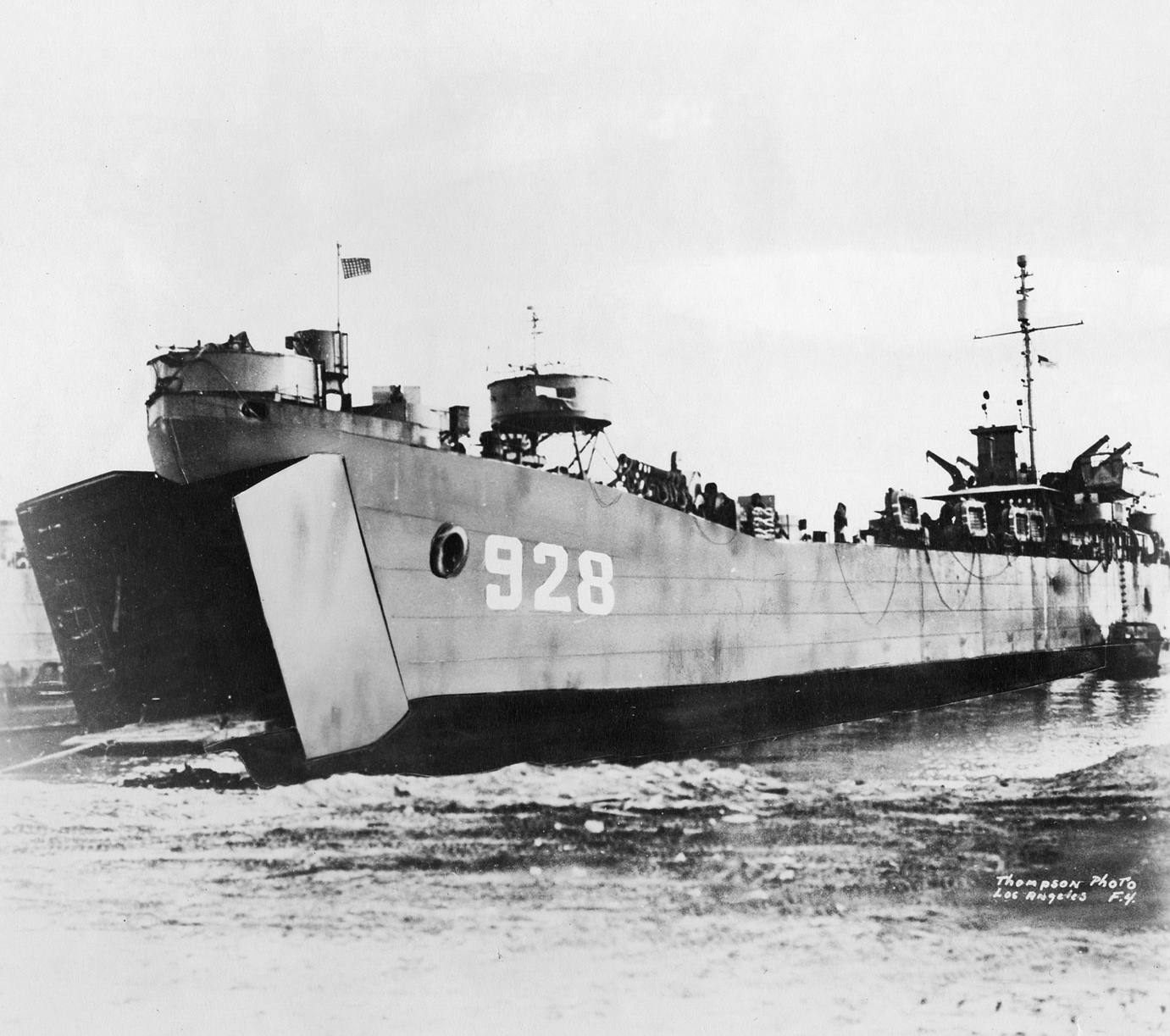
- USS LST-928

History

United States
- Name: LST-928 (1944–1955); Cameron (1955–1959)
- Namesake: Cameron County, Pennsylvania; Cameron County, Texas; Cameron Parish, Louisiana
- Builder: Bethlehem-Hingham Shipyard, Hingham, Massachusetts
- Yard number: 3398
- Laid down: 1 June 1944
- Launched: 5 July 1944
- Commissioned: 30 July 1944
- Decommissioned: 13 December 1946
- Renamed: Cameron, 1 July 1955
- Reclassified: Self-propelled Barracks Ship, 1 July 1955
- Stricken: 1959
- Identification: Hull symbol: LST-928; Hull symbol: APB-50; Code letters: NKBB
- Honors and awards: 1 × battle star
- Fate: Laid up in the Pacific Reserve Fleet, Puget Sound Naval Shipyard, 13 December 1946; Sold for commercial service, 1959

General characteristics
- Class & type: LST-542-class tank landing ship
- Displacement: 1,625 long tons (1,651 t) (light); 4,080 long tons (4,145 t) (full (seagoing draft with 1,675 short tons (1,520 t) load); 2,366 long tons (2,404 t) (beaching)
- Length: 328 ft (100 m) oa
- Beam: 50 ft (15 m)
- Draft: Unloaded: 2 ft 4 in (0.71 m) forward; 7 ft 6 in (2.29 m) aft; Full load: 8 ft 3 in (2.51 m) forward; 14 ft 1 in (4.29 m) aft; Landing with 500 short tons (450 t) load: 3 ft 11 in (1.19 m) forward; 9 ft 10 in (3.00 m) aft; Limiting 11 ft 2 in (3.40 m); Maximum navigation 14 ft 1 in (4.29 m)
- Installed power: 2 × 900 hp (670 kW) Electro-Motive Diesel 12-567A diesel engines; 1,800 shp (1,300 kW)
- Propulsion: 1 × Falk main reduction gears; 2 × Propellers
- Speed: 11.6 kn (21.5 km/h; 13.3 mph)
- Range: 24,000 nmi (44,000 km; 28,000 mi) at 9 kn (17 km/h; 10 mph) while displacing 3,960 long tons (4,024 t)
- Boats & landing craft carried: 2 x LCVPs
- Capacity: 1,600–1,900 short tons (3,200,000–3,800,000 lb; 1,500,000–1,700,000 kg) cargo depending on mission
- Troops: 16 officers, 147 enlisted men
- Complement: 13 officers, 104 enlisted men
- Armament: Varied, ultimate armament; 2 × twin 40 mm (1.57 in) Bofors guns; 4 × single 40 mm Bofors guns; 12 × 20 mm (0.79 in) Oerlikon cannons

Service record
- Part of: LST Flotilla 6
- Operations: Assault and occupation of Iwo Jima (19 February–16 March 1945)
- Awards: American Campaign Medal; Asiatic–Pacific Campaign Medal; World War II Victory Medal

USS LST-928/Cameron (APB-50) was an LST-542-class tank landing ship in the United States Navy. Like many of her class, she was not named and is properly referred to by her hull designation.

== Construction ==
LST-928 was laid down on 1 June 1944, at Hingham, Massachusetts, by the Bethlehem-Hingham Shipyard; launched on 5 July 1944; and commissioned on 30 July 1944.

== Service history ==
During World War II, LST-928 was assigned to the Asiatic-Pacific theater and participated in the assault and occupation of Iwo Jima in March 1945.

She was decommissioned on 13 December 1946, and laid up in the Pacific Reserve Fleet, Puget Sound Naval Shipyard, Bremerton, Washington. On 1 July 1955, she was reclassified as a Self-propelled Barracks Ship and renamed Cameron (APB-50). She was sold to Pacific Inland Navigation Co., for $131,000, in 1959, for hauling freight on the Columbia River. She was removed from the fleet on 1 October 1959. She was scrapped in 1960.

== Awards ==
LST-928 earned one battle star for World War II service.

- American Campaign Medal
- Asiatic-Pacific Campaign Medal with campaign star
- World War II Victory Medal

== Bibliography ==
Online resources

- "LST-928". Dictionary of American Naval Fighting Ships. Naval History and Heritage Command. This article incorporates text from this source, which is in the public domain.
- "Bethlehem-Hingham, Hingham MA". www.ShipbuildingHistory.com. 11 August 2011.
- "USS LST-928". NavSource. 6 November 2015.
