= USS Marlboro =

Barracks ship of the US Navy

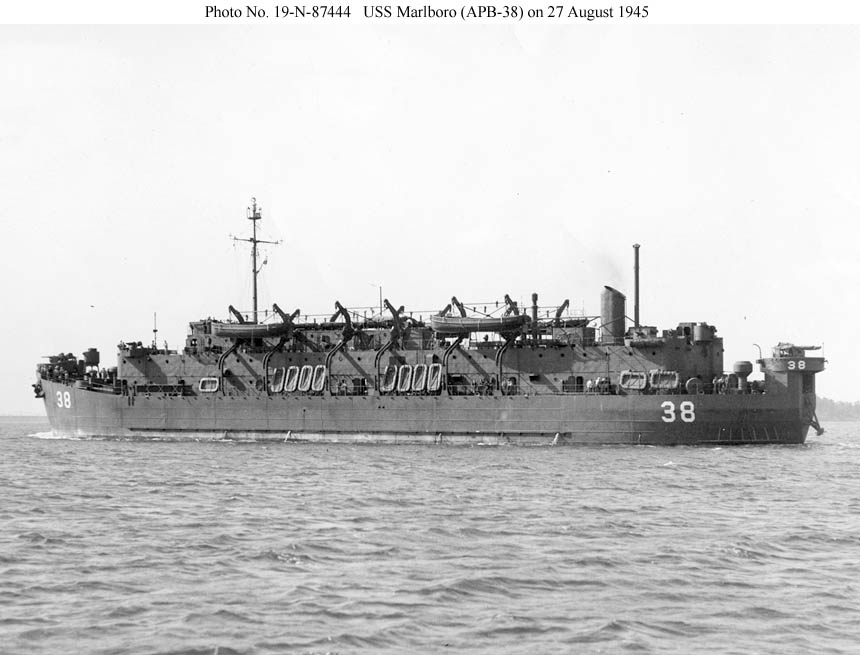
- Marlboro near Boston Navy Yard

History

United States
- Name: USS Marlboro
- Namesake: Marlboro County, South Carolina
- Builder: American Bridge Co.
- Laid down: 25 August 1944
- Launched: 17 November 1944
- Commissioned: 18 August 1945
- Decommissioned: 5 May 1947
- Fate: Scrapped, 1965

General characteristics
- Class & type: Benewah-class
- Displacement: 4,200 tons
- Length: 328 Feet
- Beam: 50 Feet
- Draft: 11 Feet, 2 Inches
- Propulsion: two General Motors 12-567A Diesel engines, double Falk Main Reduction Gears, five Diesel-drive 100 kW 120 / 240 V Ship's Service Generators, twin rudders
- Speed: 12.5 Knots
- Complement: 12 Officers, 129 Enlisted, with an additional 1,226 troops.
- Armament: Two quadruple Bofors 40mm guns, eight single 20mm AA guns

USS Marlboro (APB-38) was a Benewah-class self-propelled barracks ship of the United States Navy.

== Ship history ==
Authorized to be built as APL-38 on 17 December 1943, Marlboro was redesignated APB-38 on 8 August 1944. She was laid down by the Boston Navy Yard at Boston, Massachusetts, on 25 August 1944 and launched on 17 November 1944; sponsored by Mrs. Marjorie Guile. Marlboro was commissioned 18 August 1945. Assigned to the Atlantic Fleet, Marlboro departed Boston 14 September for shakedown in Chesapeake Bay. On 15 October Marlboro got underway from Naval Operating Base, Norfolk, Virginia, for duty with the Service Force out of New York City. She served as a barracks ship along the East Coast to the end of the year. On 8 January 1946, she steamed for the Caribbean, arriving 5 days later at Guantanamo, Cuba, where she remained until sailing 15 May with U.S. Marines embarked for the East Coast. Marlboro reached Norfolk on the 20th.

=== Fate ===
Eight days later, she moved on to Green Cove Springs, Florida, anchoring on 30 May. Assigned to the Atlantic Reserve Fleet on 1 June, she was decommissioned in January 1947 and was berthed on the St. Johns River. Marlboro was struck from the Naval Register on 1 December 1963 and scrapped in 1965.

== Awards ==

- American Campaign Medal
- World War II Victory Medal
