= USS Benewah =

Barracks ship of the United States Navy

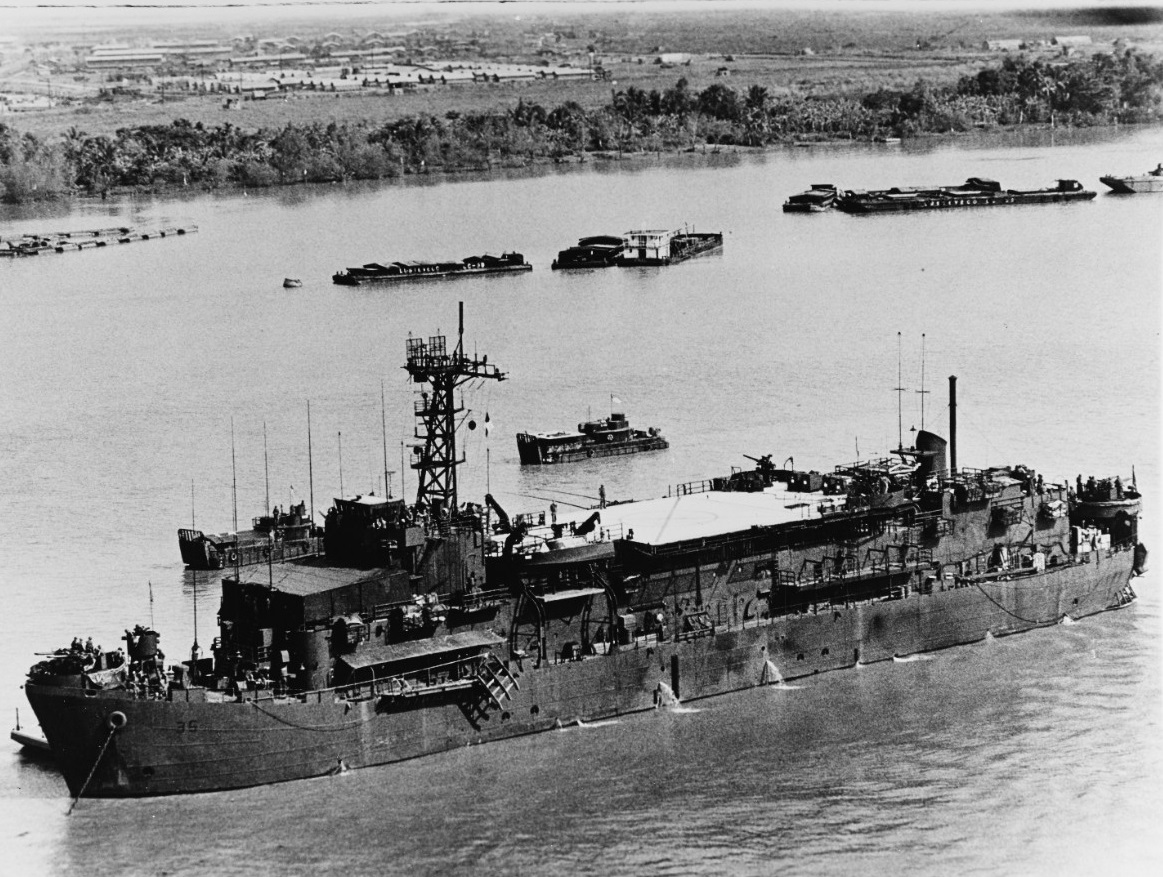
- USS Benewah and smaller craft in the Mekong Delta in 1967.

History

United States
- Name: Benewah
- Namesake: Benewah County, Idaho
- Builder: Boston Navy Yard
- Laid down: 2 January 1945
- Launched: 6 May 1945
- Commissioned: 19 March 1946
- Decommissioned: 26 February 1971
- Stricken: 1 September 1973
- Honours and awards: 11 battle stars
- Fate: Transferred to Republic of the Philippines; Now an artificial reef off the Philippine Islands

General characteristics
- Class & type: Benewah-class barracks ship
- Displacement: 4,080 tons
- Length: 328 ft 0 in (99.97 m)
- Beam: 50 ft 0 in (15.24 m)
- Draft: 11 ft 2 in (3.40 m)
- Speed: 10 knots (19 km/h; 12 mph)
- Complement: 141; 1,226 troops
- Armament: 2 × 3 in (76 mm) guns; 2 × 40 mm quad gun mounts; 2 × 0.5 in (12.7 mm) machine guns; 4 × .30 cal (7.62 mm) machine guns

USS Benewah (APB-35) was a barracks ship of the United States Navy, and lead ship of her class. She was notable for her service in World War II, Korean War, and Vietnam War.

== Launch ==
Benewah (APB-35) was laid down on 2 January 1945, by the Boston Navy Yard and launched on 6 May 1945, sponsored by Miss Priscilla Underwood. She was commissioned on 19 March 1946.

== Atlantic service ==
Following outfitting, Benewah remained at Boston serving with the Atlantic Reserve Fleet as a barracks ship for the crews of aircraft carriers going out of commission. That assignment lasted just four months. On 29 July, she herself began deactivation procedures. Benewah was decommissioned on 30 August 1946.

The barracks ship remained in reserve at Boston until February 1947 when she was moved to the St. Johns River waterfront facilities of Naval Auxiliary Air Station Green Cove Springs, Florida. There, she was placed in service, in reserve, to serve as headquarters ship for Subgroup 3 of the Florida Group, Atlantic Reserve Fleet. On 10 October 1951, work began on Benewah in preparation for her return to active service; and she was recommissioned on 9 November 1951.

Just after commissioning, the barracks ship entered the Gibbs Shipyard at Jacksonville, Florida for outfitting. From mid-January to mid-February 1952, she conducted shakedown and refresher training out of Norfolk, Virginia. After she concluded training in mid-February, Benewah moved north to her new home port, Newport, Rhode Island.

The U.S.S. Benewah APB-35 in port at Naples, Italy during April 1955.

The ship departed Newport on 9 March for her first overseas deployment. For the next nine months, she provided logistics support for mobile construction battalions operations in the European area. The ship returned to Newport on 19 December, and took up operations along the eastern seaboard. In July 1953, Benewah entered the Norfolk Naval Shipyard to be fitted out as a temporary flagship. On 22 August, she departed Norfolk for Naples, Italy, where she served as flagship for the Commander, Fleet Air, Eastern Atlantic and Mediterranean. Late in the summer of 1955, she concluded that assignment and headed back to the United States.

The ship arrived in Norfolk on 11 September, but, later in the month, moved north to New York. On 30 September, Benewah began her second deactivation overhaul at Staten Island, New York, in the yard of the Brewer Dry Dock Company. The barracks ship was decommissioned sometime in December 1955, and was berthed with the Green Cove Springs Group, Atlantic Reserve Fleet. The ship remained inactive until August 1959 when she was placed in service, in reserve. By February 1960, she was at Newport News, Virginia, serving as living quarters for the precommissioning crews of new ships being built by the Newport News Shipbuilding & Drydock Company.

== Vietnam War ==
In July 1966, Benewah entered the Philadelphia Naval Shipyard for conversion and modernization preparatory to her return to active service. She was recommissioned on 28 January 1967.

Following a week of training at the Naval Amphibious Base, Little Creek, Virginia, the ship put to sea for the Far East. After stops at Rodman in the Canal Zone and at Pearl Harbor, Benewah reached South Vietnam on 22 April. Upon arrival, she became flagship for the Commander Task Force (CTF) 117, the Mobile Riverine Force operating in the Mekong Delta. Except for an occasional trip to Japan for repairs, Benewah spent the next 44 months at various locations in the Mekong Delta. In 1967–69, Benewah spent most of its time in the Mekong River near the 9th Infantry Division base at Đồng Tâm or an alternate anchorage near Bến Tre. In addition to serving as headquarters, she provided barracks space, medical facilities, stores issue and a myriad of other services to the sailors and soldiers operating with the Mobile Riverine Force and with the similar formations that succeeded that organization when it was disestablished late in August 1969. The barracks ship frequently suffered enemy fire, and her guns went into action on numerous occasions. In May and early June 1970, Benewah participated in the Cambodian Campaign to support forces interdicting the Viet Cong supply lines running through that country.

== Philippines ==
On 26 November 1970, the ship departed Vietnam and headed for the Philippines. After a visit to Singapore between 28 November and 5 December, she arrived at Subic Bay on 11 December. There, Benewah underwent an inspection by a board of inspection and survey. That board determined that she was unfit for further active naval service. She was decommissioned there on 26 February 1971 and was turned over to the Naval Station, Subic Bay, to serve as station ship. Though decommissioned, Benewah remained on the active list in an in-service status. She was also redesignated a miscellaneous auxiliary, IX-311, two days after her decommissioning on 28 February 1971. She served at Subic Bay until 1 September 1973 on which day her name was struck from the Naval Vessel Register. In May 1974, she was transferred to the Republic of the Philippines.

== Ship awards ==
Benewah earned 11 battle stars during the Vietnam War.

Combat Action Ribbon (2)	Navy Presidential Unit Citation (2)	
Navy Unit Commendation (4)	Navy Meritorious Unit Commendation	American Campaign Medal
World War II Victory Medal	National Defense Service Medal (2)	Vietnam Service Medal (13)
Vietnam Gallantry Cross	Vietnam Civil Actions Unit Citation	Republic of Vietnam Campaign Medal
