= USS Mercer (APL-39) =

American barracks ship (1945–47)

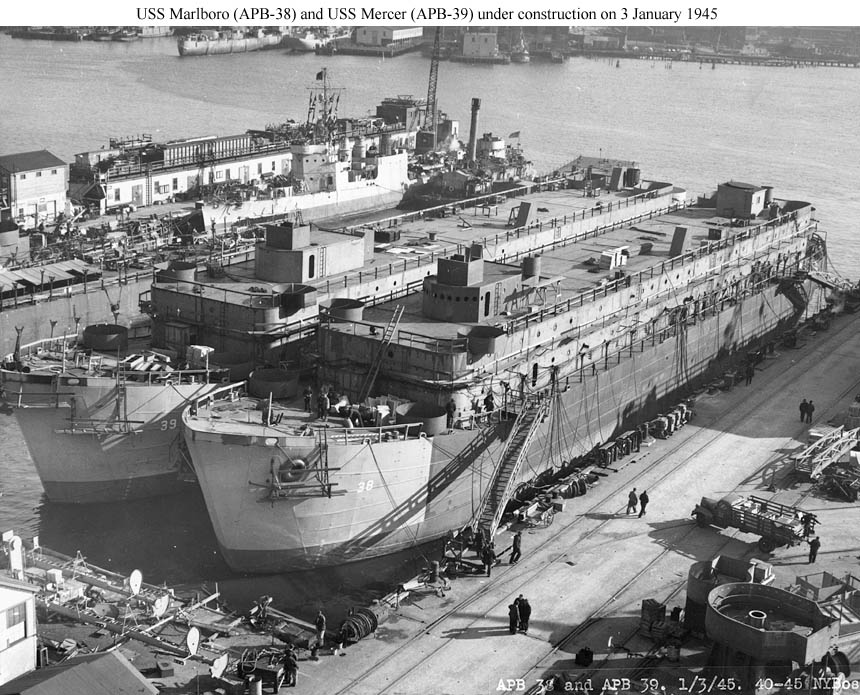

History

United States
- Name: USS Mercer
- Namesake: Mercer County, Illinois; Mercer County, Kentucky; Mercer County, Missouri; Mercer County, New Jersey; Mercer County, North Dakota; Mercer County, Ohio; Mercer County, Pennsylvania; Mercer County, West Virginia
- Builder: Boston Navy Yard, Massachusetts
- Laid down: 24 August 1944
- Launched: 17 November 1944
- Sponsored by: Mrs. Lillian Gaudette
- Commissioned: 19 September 1945
- Decommissioned: 18 June 1947
- Renamed: Mercer, 14 March 1945
- Reclassified: APB-39, 7 August 1944
- Recommissioned: 12 October 1951
- Decommissioned: 17 February 1956
- Recommissioned: 11 May 1968
- Decommissioned: Date unknown
- In service: 1 November 1975
- Reclassified: Miscellaneous Auxiliary IX-502, date unknown; Barracks Ship APL-39, 7 March 2001
- Honors and awards: 4 campaign stars, Presidential Unit Citation and Navy Unit Commendation (Vietnam)
- Status: in active service

General characteristics
- Class & type: Benewah APB-35
- Displacement: 4,080 long tons (4,145 t)
- Length: 328 ft (100 m)
- Beam: 50 ft (15 m)
- Draft: 11 ft 2 in (3.40 m)
- Speed: 10 knots (19 km/h; 12 mph)
- Troops: 1,226
- Complement: 141
- Armament: 8 × 40 mm guns; 8 × 50 cal and 10 X 30 cal machine guns

The second USS Mercer (APB 39/IX 502/APL 39) is an Benewah-class barracks ship of the United States Navy. Originally classified as Barracks Craft APL 39, the ship was reclassified as Self-Propelled Barracks Ship APB 39 on 7 August 1944. Laid down on 24 August 1944 by Boston Navy Yard, and launched on 17 November 1944 as APB 39, sponsored by Mrs. Lillian Gaudette, the ship was named Mercer, after counties in eight states, on 14 March 1945, and commissioned on 19 September 1945.

== Service history ==
=== New York, 1945–1947 ===
Mercer, a barracks ship built on an LST hull, commenced her career of berthing and messing large numbers of naval personnel at New York on 7 November 1945. Transferred to the Inactive Fleet in January 1946, for their first few days after they arrived in New York in March 1946 she served as quarters for the newly assigned 79 member Marine security detachment for the United Nations Organization meetings at Hunter College in The Bronx, she remained at New York until 9 September, when she got underway for Orange, Texas, and remained in duty there until the spring of 1947. She then headed for Green Cove Springs, Florida, where she was decommissioned on 18 June 1947, but remained in service with the Florida Group, Atlantic Reserve Fleet.

=== Naples, Rhode Island and Argentina, 1951–1956 ===
She was recommissioned on 12 October 1951 and after a brief overhaul sailed for Norfolk, Virginia, en route to Naples, Italy, where she served as a receiving ship until 1 July 1952.

Returning to the United States on 21 July, she underwent an overhaul and reported to Davisville, Rhode Island, for duty as a barracks ship for Mobile Construction Battalions. On such duty into late 1955, Mercer was thrice deployed to Argentia, Newfoundland from 19 March to 3 October 1953, 14 March to 18 October 1954, and 27 February to 25 July 1955. Her Seabee duty was interrupted when she sailed to Washington, D.C., to berth midshipmen of the United States Merchant Marine Academy taking part in President Dwight D. Eisenhower's 1953 Inaugural Parade.

Upon returning from her 1955 Argentina deployment, Mercer sailed to New York for a pre-inactivation overhaul, and on 7 November she sailed for Green Cove Springs where she was decommissioned 17 February 1956, and once again entered the Reserve Fleet. Eleven years later she was reactivated and taken to Long Beach, California for modernization.

=== Vietnam, 1968–1969 ===
She was recommissioned on 11 May 1968 and on 2 June reported for duty with the Amphibious Force, Pacific Fleet, at San Diego. Within the month she was en route to her ultimate assignment, South Vietnam where she arrived at Vung Tau on 31 July. Well into 1969 she supported Mobile Riverine Force fighting Viet Cong and People's Army of Vietnam forces operating in South Vietnam.

Mercer left Vietnam in August 1969 and then served as a Barricks Ship at Willamette Iron and Steel Works in Portland, OR. in the mid-1970s.

=== Sasebo, 1975–1980s ===
Decommissioned and reclassified as Miscellaneous Auxiliary IX 502, a messing and berthing barge, she was placed in service on 1 November 1975 at the US Naval Ship Repair Facility, Sasebo, Japan.

=== 1980s and 1990s ===
IX 502 served during the 1980s as a berthing barge at Naval Station San Diego, providing sleeping quarters, messing, and classroom accommodation for crews of ships undergoing maintenance. The ship was towed in the early 1990s to the Long Beach Naval Shipyard, California, where she served the same function until the shipyard closed in 1997.

=== Return to Sasebo ===
Reclassified as Barracks Ship (non-self propelled) APL 39 on 7 March 2001, APL 39 is part of the CincPacFlt Berthing and Messing Program and is berthed at SRF Det. Sasebo, Japan. It was listed for auction on 2 December 2024

== Awards ==
USS Mercer earned four campaign stars for Vietnam War service with four awards of the Combat Action Ribbon, in addition to the Presidential Unit Citation and the Navy Unit Commendation.
