= Barracks ship =

Watercraft used as military accommodation

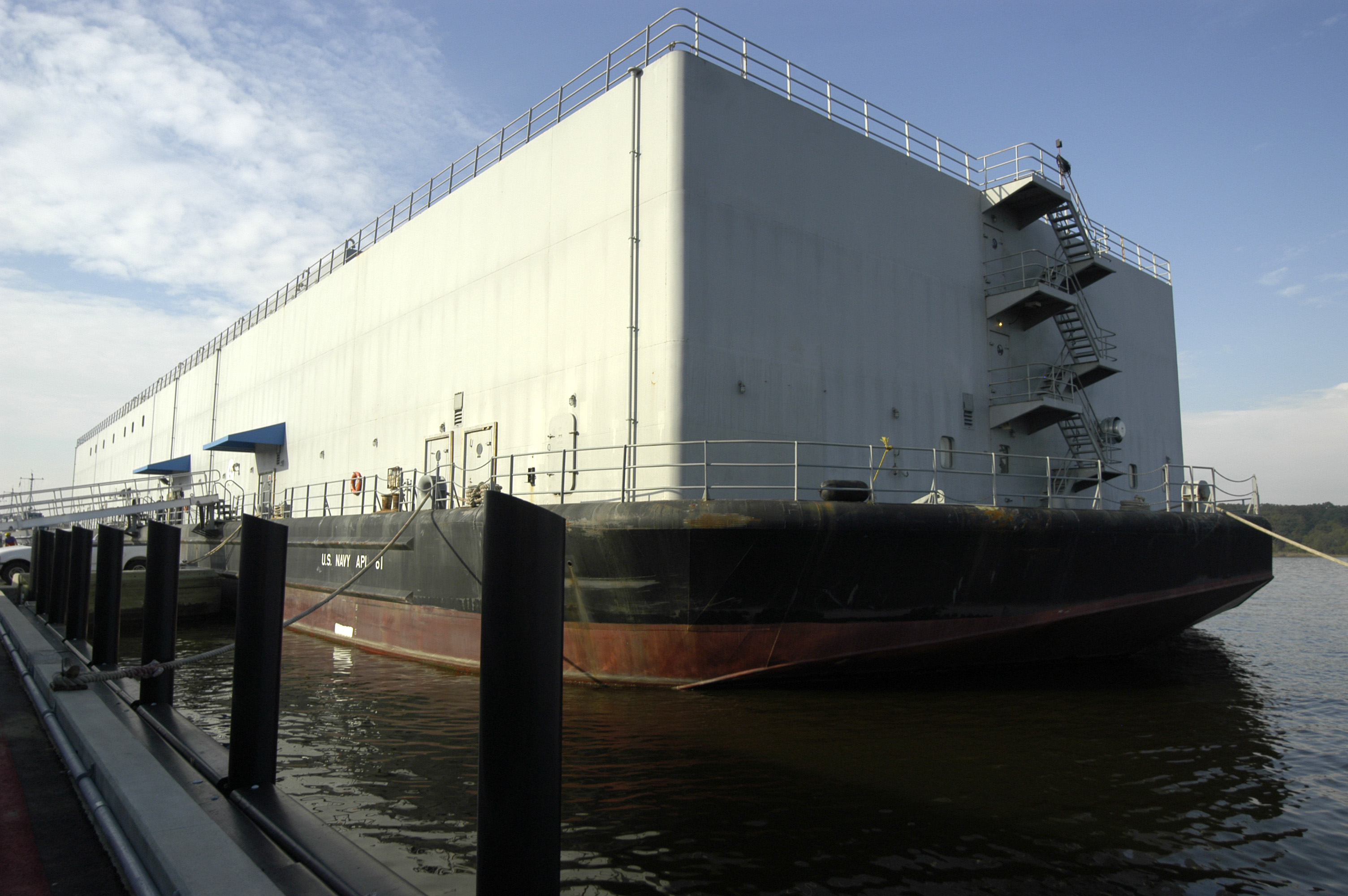
US Navy barracks ship APL-61 in 2003

A barracks ship or barracks barge or berthing barge, or in civilian use accommodation vessel or accommodation ship, is a ship or a non-self-propelled barge containing a superstructure of a type suitable for use as a temporary barracks for sailors or other military personnel. A barracks ship, a military form of a dormitory ship, may also be used as a receiving unit for sailors who need temporary residence prior to being assigned to their ship. The United States Navy used to call them Yard Repair Berthing and Messing with designations YRBM and YRBM(L) and now classes them as either Auxiliary Personnel Barracks (APB) or Auxiliary Personnel Lighter (aka barge) (APL).

== Early use ==
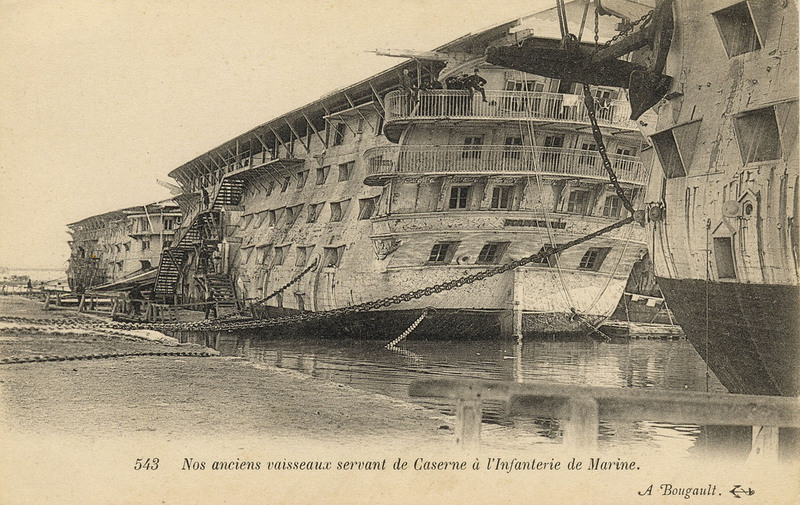
French ship Souverain, barracks for marines

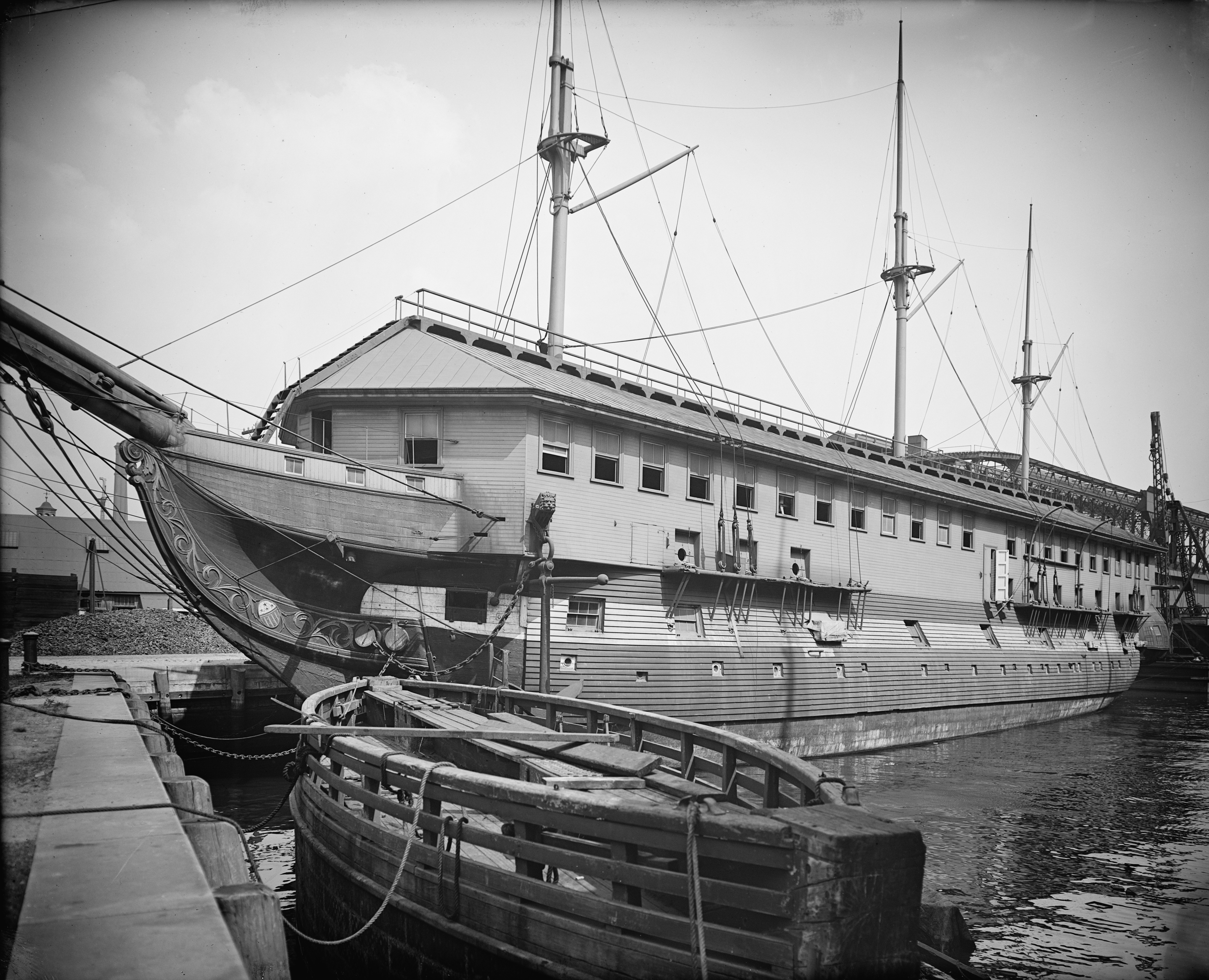
USS Constitution as a barracks ship in Boston c. 1905

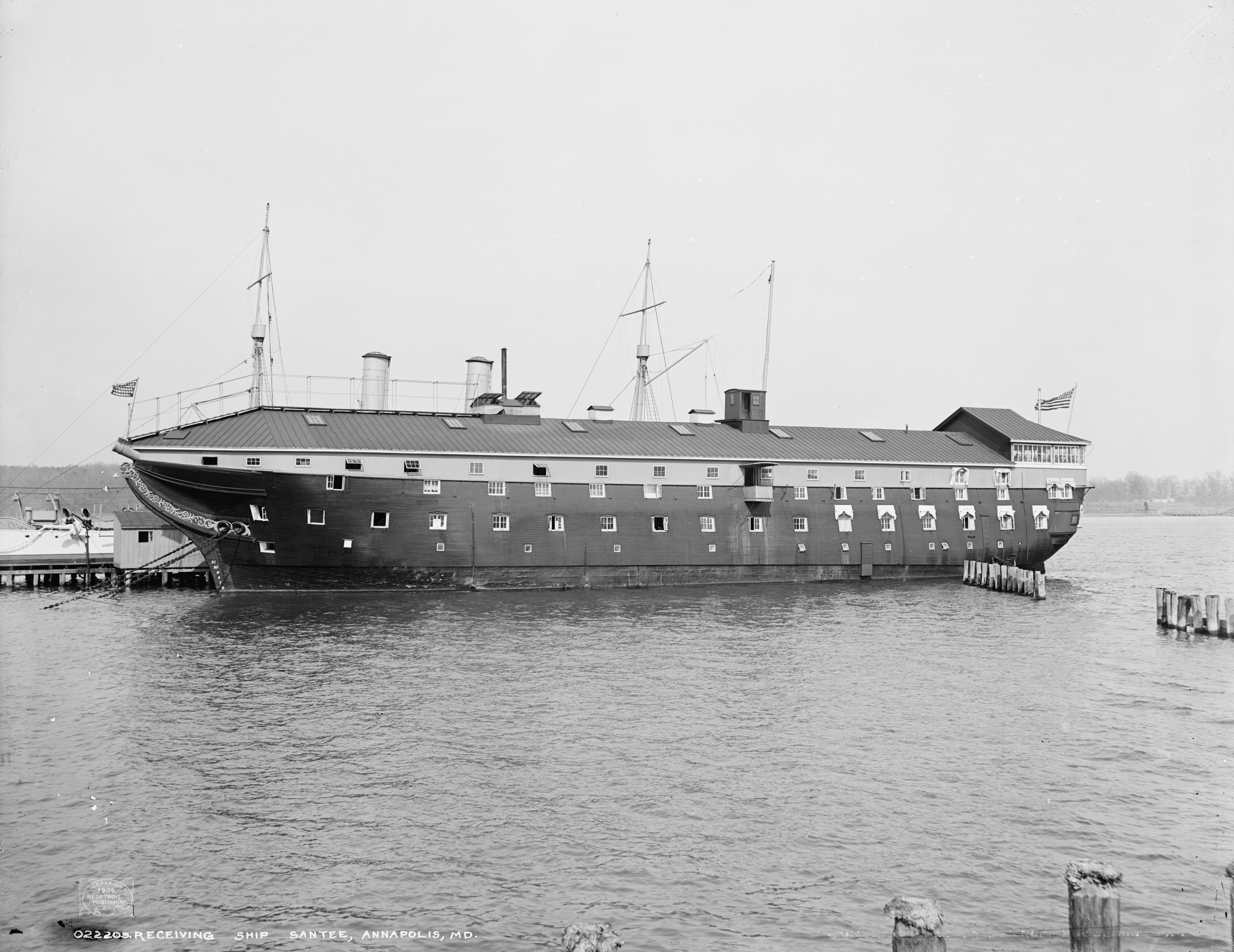
USS Santee moored at the United States Naval Academy as a barracks ship in 1905.

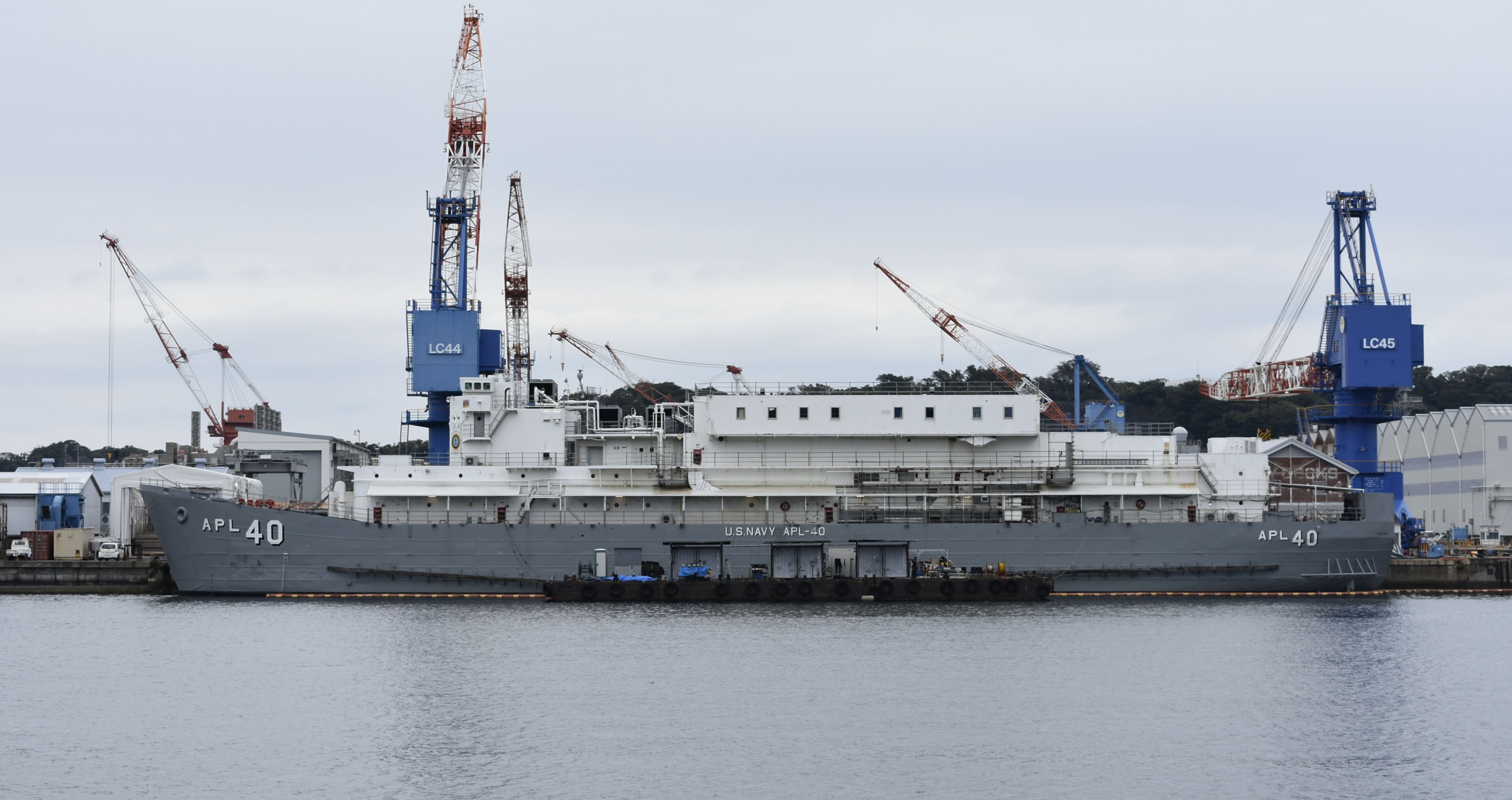
U.S. Navy APL-40 at United States Fleet Activities Yokosuka in October 2021

Barrack ships were in common use during the era of sailing ships when shore facilities were scarce or non-existent. Barrack ships were usually hulks. At times, barrack ships were also used as prison ships for convicts, prisoners of war or civilian internees.

== Use in World War II ==
Barracks ships in the combat area provided necessary residence for sailors and merchantmen whose ship had been sunk, or whose ship had been so damaged that on-board berthing was no longer possible. They were also used as accommodation at advanced bases, and as mobile barracks for units such as construction battalions. Occasionally, they would be used for other roles such as providing office space.

APL were non-self-propelled barracks ships, which were used by the United States Navy in forward areas during World War II, especially in the Pacific Ocean, and were designated APL, such as APL-18 which was commissioned in 1944 and had the following specifications for APL-1 to APL-58:

- Displacement 1,300 t.(lt), 2,579 t.(fl)
- Length 261 ft (80 m)
- Beam 49 ft (15 m)
- Draft 11 ft (3.4 m)
- Complement unknown
- Accommodations 5 Officers, 358 Enlisted

The APL-17-class barracks ship covered APL-17 to APL-40 with APL-35 to APL-40 converted to become Benewah-class barracks ships.

Transport ships were also used as barracks by other war-time navies, such as the Kriegsmarine's SS General San Martin. One of the two abortive Jade class auxiliary aircraft carriers (Elbe) was also converted into a barracks ship.

== Subsequent use ==
The United Kingdom used barracks ships to help garrison the Falkland Islands after it ousted the Argentinian occupation force in the 1982 Falklands War. The former car ferries MV St Edmund and TEV Rangatira were deployed to Port Stanley in 1982, and Rangatira stayed until September 1983.

Rangatira is also an example of a civilian accommodation ship. She and another former ferry, MV Odysseus, housed workers who built an oil platform in Loch Kishorn in Scotland in 1977–1978, and Rangatira housed workers who built Sullom Voe Terminal in the Shetland Islands in 1978–1981.

== Post World War II USN use ==
A large number of United States Navy barges survived World War II and continued to act in a support role as yard repair barges, some with berthing. Some were used by the "Brown Water Navy" of the United States during the Vietnam War as bases for specialized river boats. The barge YRBM-18 (former APL-55) received the Presidential Unit Citation for service during the Vietnam War from 6 December 1968 to 31 March 1969.

The following Yard Repair types have been created:

- Floating Workshops (YR), 96 built, 24 built before WW2
- Repair and Berthing Barges (YRB), 36 built
- Repair, Berthing and Messing Barges (YRBM), 56 built
- Dry-Dock Workshops, Hull (YRDH), 8 built
- Dry-Dock Workshops, Machinery (YRDM), 8 built
- Radiological Repair Barges (YRR), 14 built. Used to support nuclear plant overhauls of nuclear ships and submarines, also refuelling and decontamination of used equipment.

The YRB and YRBM barges and Auxiliary Personnel Lighters (APL) are available to temporarily house personnel off ships. The 70 ships are assigned to the Naval Sea Systems Command (NAVSEA) to bases around the world (Norfolk and Portsmouth, Virginia; San Diego; Bremerton, Washington; Mayport, Florida; Pearl Harbor, Hawaii; Yokosuka and Sasebo in Japan; and Guam).

=== APL 65 class ===
The United States Navy placed a contract for two APL 65 berthing barges in August 1998 which were delivered to the Navy in November and December 2000. The APL 65 berthing barges include post office, barber shop, bank, classrooms, laundry, medical facilities and fitness services.

=== APL 67 class ===
The older berthing barges are being replaced by five newer ships of the APL 67 class which are being purpose built by VT Halter Marine. The first contract was awarded in September 2018 with APL 67 launched in June 2020 and delivered to the USN in August 2021 followed by APL 68 which was delivered in November 2021.

- Displacement: 2,744 t
- Length: 269 ft (82 m)
- Beam 69 ft (21 m)
- Draft 16 or 7 ft (4.9 or 2.1 m)
- Accommodations: 600 (5 Officers, 358 Enlisted)

The APL67 fleet is planned to be 14 in total. 26 'medium' APLs are also planned.

On 21 November 2022, the Navy accepted APL68, saying it would support the impending USS Harry S. Truman carrier repair cycle.

== See also ==
- Type B ship
- Floating battery
- Rhino ferry
- List of auxiliaries of the United States Navy § Self-propelled barracks ships (APB)
- List of auxiliaries of the United States Navy § Barracks craft (APL)
