= Southerland =

Southerland may refer to:

== Persons ==
- Clarence A. Southerland (1889–1973), Justice of the Delaware Supreme Court
- James Southerland, American professional basketball player
- Pug Southerland (1911-1949), American Navy fighter pilot during World War II
- Steve Southerland (Tennessee politician) (born 1955), member of the Tennessee House of Representatives
- Steve Southerland (Florida politician) (born 1965), United States Representative for Florida's 2nd District
- Thom Southerland (fl. 2000s–2010s), English theatre director
- William Henry Hudson Southerland (1852–1933), rear admiral in the United States Navy

== Others ==
- USS Southerland (DD-743), a Gearing-class American destroyer
- Fort Southerland, Arkansas site of a Civil War engagement, part of the Camden Expedition
