= USS APL-15 =

Barracks ship of the United States Navy

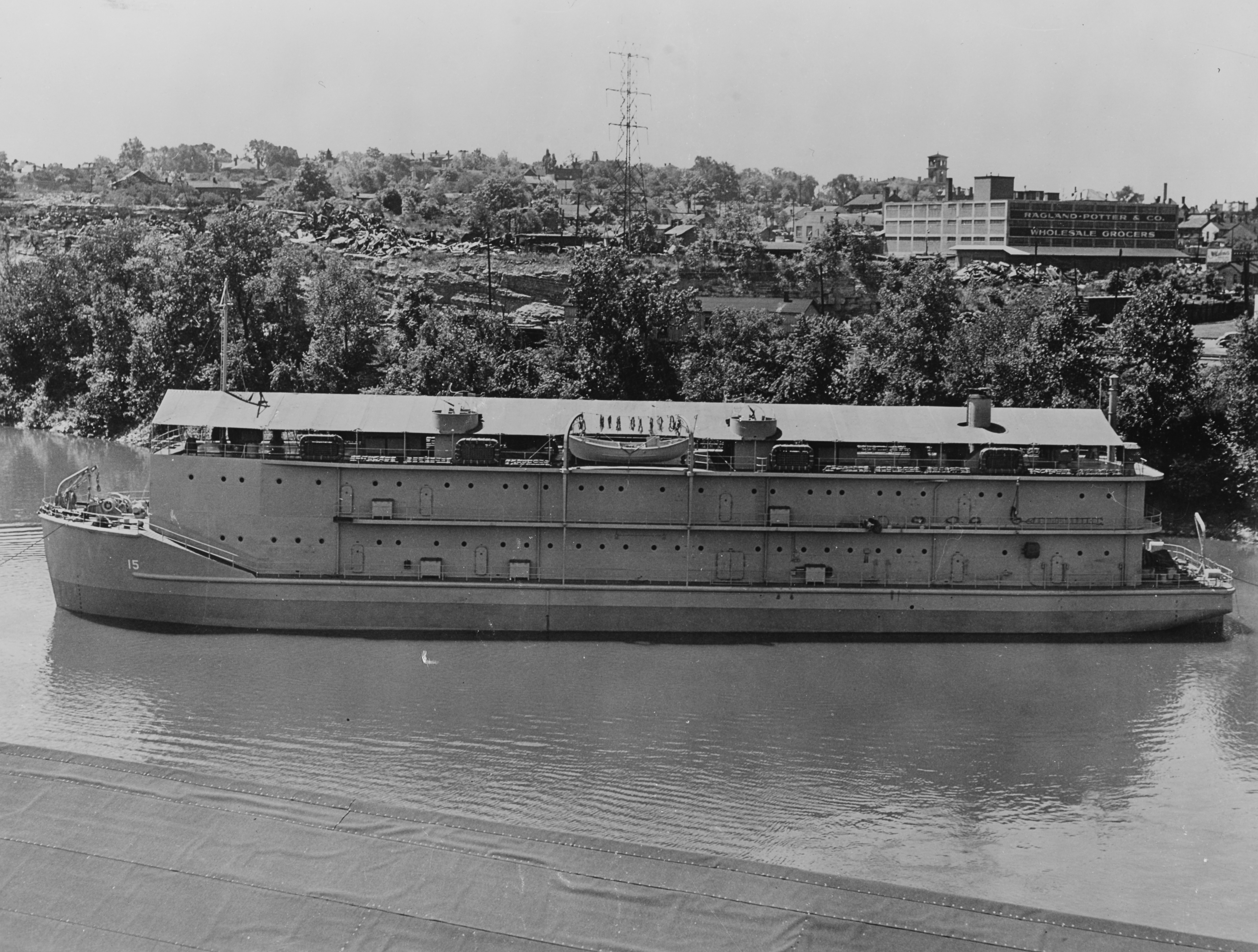
- USS APL-15

History

United States
- Name: APL-15
- Ordered: 3 May 1943
- Builder: Nashville Bridge Co.
- Laid down: 29 October 1943
- Launched: 29 January 1944
- Commissioned: 1 August 1944
- Decommissioned: 17 May 1946
- Renamed: from YF-609, 1943
- Home port: San Diego
- Identification: Hull number: APL-15
- Honors and awards: See Awards
- Status: Berthed in San Diego

General characteristics
- Class & type: APL-2-class barracks ship
- Displacement: 1,300 t (1,279 long tons) (standard); 2,660 t (2,618 long tons) (full load)
- Length: 260 ft 0 in (79.25 m)
- Beam: 49 ft 2 in (14.99 m)
- Draft: 8 ft 6 in (2.59 m)
- Installed power: 100kW 450 AC
- Propulsion: 3 × Diesel generators
- Capacity: 0 officers; 583 enlisted; 1,000 Bbls (Diesel)
- Complement: 6 officers; 66 enlisted

USS APL-15 is an APL-2-class barracks ship of the United States Navy.

== Construction and career ==
The ship was laid down on 29 October 1943, by the Nashville Bridge Co. and launched on 29 January 1944. She was commissioned on 1 August 1944.

From 26 August to 2 November 1944, she was towed by WSA tug Scotch Cap from New Orleans to Pearl Harbor.

The ship was assigned to Naval Base Guam from March 1945 to 17 May 1946.

She was decommissioned on 17 May 1946 and put into the reserve fleet by January 1947.

The ship undertook the CincPacFlt Berthing and Messing Program, in which she has been berthed in San Diego since at least the early 2000s. She is being used as a berthing and messing barge.

== Awards ==
- Asiatic–Pacific Campaign Medal
- World War II Victory Medal
- National Defense Service Medal
- American Campaign Medal
