= USS APL-2 =

Barracks ship of the United States Navy

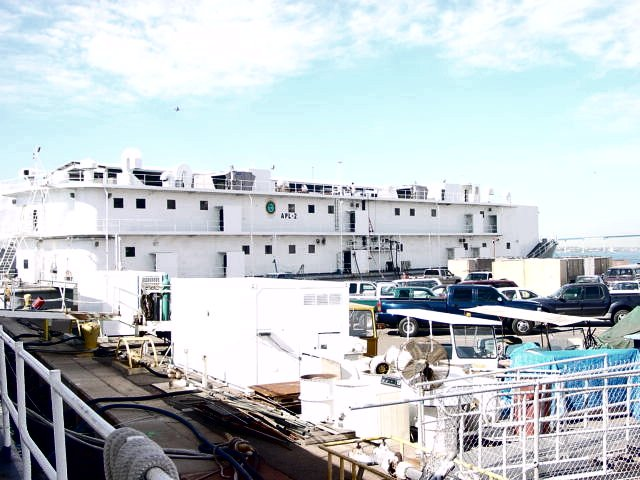
- USS APL-2

History

United States
- Name: APL-2
- Ordered: 7 October 1943
- Builder: Puget Sound Navy Yard
- Laid down: 12 May 1944
- Launched: 6 July 1944
- Commissioned: 25 May 1945
- Decommissioned: January 1947
- Home port: San Diego
- Identification: Hull number: APL-2
- Honours and awards: See Awards
- Status: Berthed in San Diego

General characteristics
- Class & type: APL-2-class barracks ship
- Displacement: 1,300 t (1,279 long tons) (standard); 2,660 t (2,618 long tons) (full load)
- Length: 260 ft 0 in (79.25 m)
- Beam: 49 ft 2 in (14.99 m)
- Draft: 8 ft 6 in (2.59 m)
- Installed power: 100kW 450 AC
- Propulsion: 3 × Diesel generators
- Capacity: 0 officers; 583 enlisted; 1,000 Bbls (Diesel)
- Complement: 6 officers; 66 enlisted

USS APL-2 is the lead ship of the APL-2-class barracks ship of the United States Navy.

== Construction and career ==
The ship was laid down on 12 May 1944, by the Puget Sound Navy Yard and launched on 6 July 1944. She was commissioned on 25 May 1945.

From 15 to 27 June 1945, she was towed by USS Sotoymo (ATA-121) from Seattle to Pearl Harbor. Between 4 and 22 July of that same year, she was towed by the same ship to Eniewetok.

She was put into the reserve fleet by January 1947.

The ship undertook the CincPacFlt Berthing and Messing Program, in which she is berthed in San Diego since at least the early 2000s. She is being used as a berthing and messing barge.

== Awards ==
- American Campaign Medal
- Asiatic-Pacific Campaign Medal
- World War II Victory Medal
- Philippines Liberation Medal
