= USS APL-4 =

Barracks ship of the United States Navy

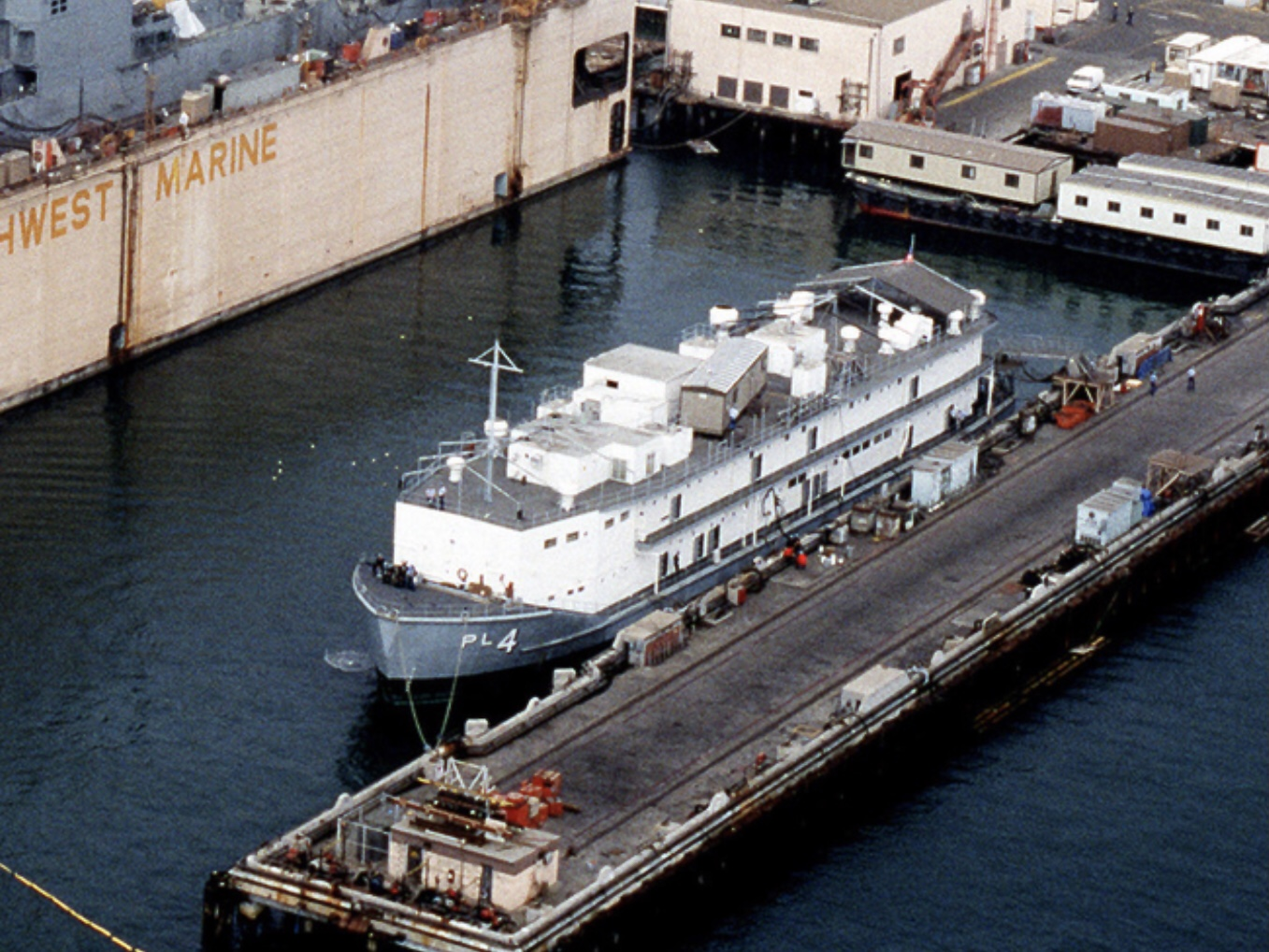
- USS APL-4

History

United States
- Name: APL-4
- Ordered: 7 October 1943
- Builder: Puget Sound Navy Yard
- Laid down: 27 May 1944
- Launched: 3 August 1944
- Commissioned: 21 September 1945
- Decommissioned: January 1947
- Home port: San Diego
- Identification: Hull number: APL-4
- Status: Berthed in San Diego

General characteristics
- Class & type: APL-2-class barracks ship
- Displacement: 1,300 t (1,279 long tons) (standard); 2,660 t (2,618 long tons) (full load)
- Length: 260 ft 0 in (79.25 m)
- Beam: 49 ft 2 in (14.99 m)
- Draft: 8 ft 6 in (2.59 m)
- Installed power: 100kW 450 AC
- Propulsion: 3 × Diesel generators
- Capacity: 0 officers; 583 enlisted; 1,000 Bbls (Diesel)
- Complement: 6 officers; 66 enlisted

USS APL-4 is an APL-2-class barracks ship of the United States Navy.

== Construction and career ==
The ship was laid down on 31 May 1944, by the Puget Sound Navy Yard and launched on 3 August 1944. She was commissioned on 21 September 1945.

She was put into the reserve fleet by January 1947.

The ship undertook the CincPacFlt Berthing and Messing Program, in which she is berthed in San Diego since at least the early 2000s. She is being used as a berthing and messing barge.
