= USS APL-5 =

Barracks ship of the United States Navy

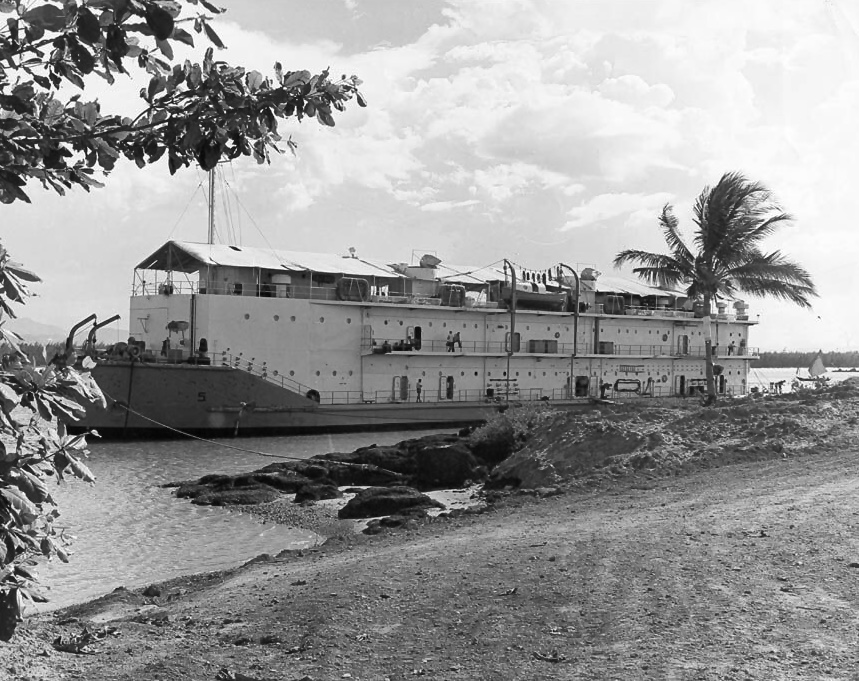
- USS APL-5

History

United States
- Name: APL-5
- Ordered: 7 October 1943
- Builder: Puget Sound Navy Yard
- Laid down: 8 July 1944
- Launched: 14 November 1944
- Commissioned: 5 November 1945
- Decommissioned: January 1947
- Home port: San Diego
- Identification: Hull number: APL-5
- Honors and awards: See Awards
- Status: Berthed in San Diego

General characteristics
- Class & type: APL-2-class barracks ship
- Displacement: 1,300 t (1,279 long tons) (standard); 2,660 t (2,618 long tons) (full load)
- Length: 260 ft 0 in (79.25 m)
- Beam: 49 ft 2 in (14.99 m)
- Draft: 8 ft 6 in (2.59 m)
- Installed power: 100kW 450 AC
- Propulsion: 3 × Diesel generators
- Capacity: 0 officers; 583 enlisted; 1,000 Bbls (Diesel)
- Complement: 6 officers; 66 enlisted

USS APL-5 is an APL-2-class barracks ship of the United States Navy.

== Construction and career ==
The ship was laid down on 8 July 1944, by the Puget Sound Navy Yard and launched on 14 November 1944. She was commissioned on 5 November 1945.

She was put into the reserve fleet by January 1947.

APL-5 was deployed to Vietnam in November 1966 to provide accommodation to sailors stationed in Chu Lai during the Vietnam War. Upon arriving, the ship had run into muddy grounds and became stuck. USS Manhattan was sent to free her from the mud, in which the ship was successfully freed and guided her to her berthing area in Chu Lai. APL-5 had 4-inch/50 cal guns for self defense.

The ship undertook the CincPacFlt Berthing and Messing Program, in which she is berthed in San Diego since at least the early 2000s. She is being used as a berthing and messing barge.

== Awards ==
- National Defense Service Medal
- Vietnam Service Medal
- Republic of Vietnam Campaign Medal
