= APL-2-class barracks ship =

Class of United States Navy barrack ships

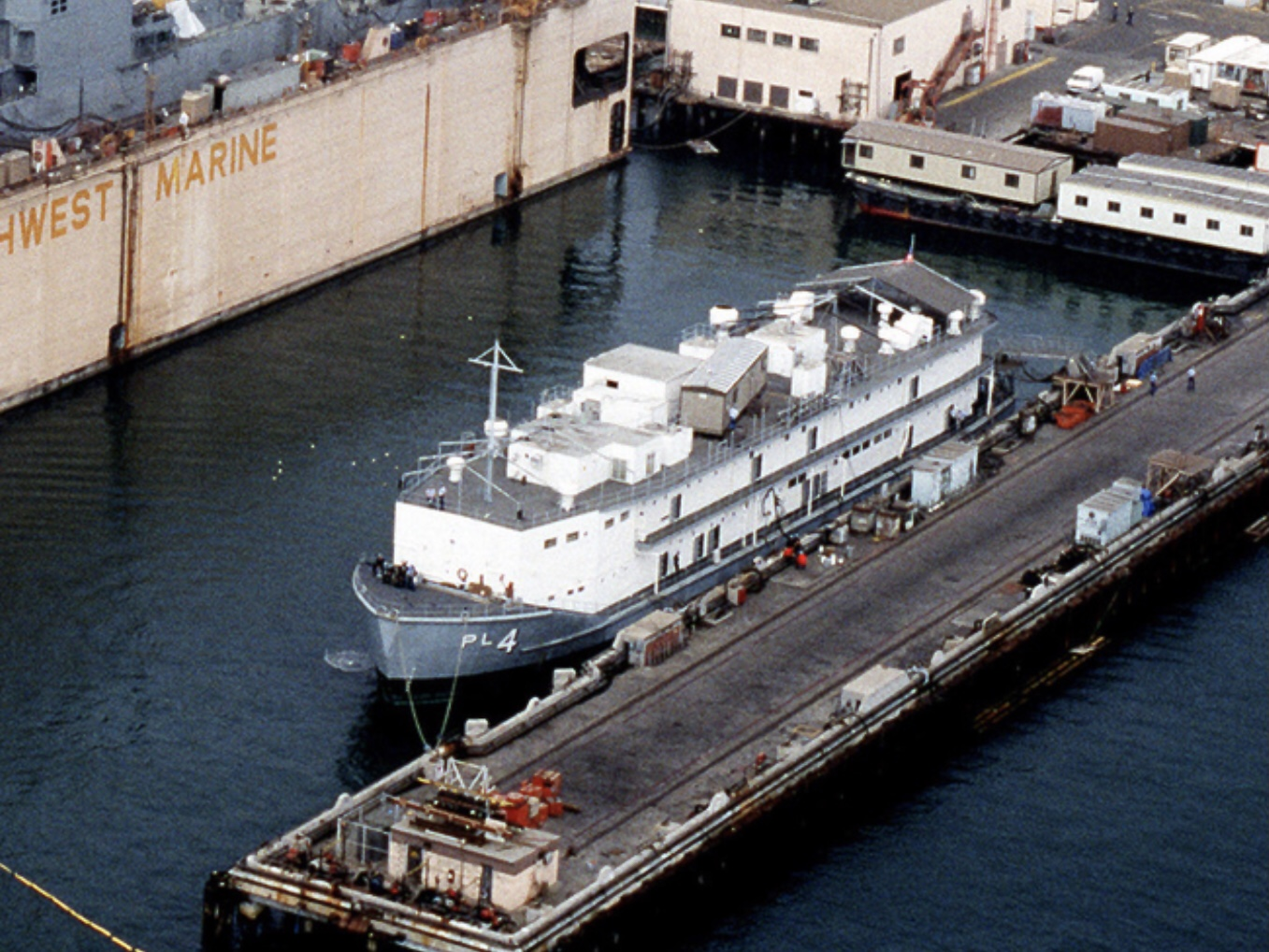
- USS APL-4

Class overview
- Name: APL-2 class
- Builders: Puget Sound Navy Yard; Boston Navy Yard; Nashville Bridge Co.
- Operators: United States Navy; United States Coast Guard
- Preceded by: Edmund B. Alexander class
- Succeeded by: APL-17 class
- Built: 1943-1945
- In commission: 1944-1946
- Planned: 15
- Completed: 12
- Canceled: 3
- Active: 4
- Retired: 8

General characteristics
- Type: Barracks ship
- Displacement: 1,300 t (1,279 long tons) (standard); 2,660 t (2,618 long tons) (full load)
- Length: 260 ft 0 in (79.25 m)
- Beam: 49 ft 2 in (14.99 m)
- Draft: 8 ft 6 in (2.59 m)
- Installed power: 100kW 450 AC
- Propulsion: 3 × Diesel generators
- Capacity: 0 officers; 583 enlisted; 1,000 Bbls (Diesel)
- Complement: 6 officers; 66 enlisted
- Armament: 4 × Oerlikon 20 mm cannons

The APL-2-class barracks ship was a class of barracks ships of the United States Navy after the Second World War, in the late 1940s.

== Development ==
Twelve ships were built during World War II with 3 cancelled. APL-12 and APL-13 were intentionally destroyed after being grounded by Typhoon Louise at Okinawa, by demolition charges, in February 1946. Franklin D. Roosevelt approved the construction of tenders and repair ships in May 1943, it was then recommended by the Auxiliary Vessels Board on 11 June later that year, that the construction of barracks ships.

The class consists of barges with a two-story barracks built on top instead of a warehouse design, and they had an auxiliary vessel designation of "A". Moreover, on their top deck, 4 Oerlikon 20 mm cannons were placed together with 2 guns and their platforms on each side of the ship. The guns were later removed after being put into the reserve fleet in 1946.

Since 2011, only 4 ships have been in service at Naval Station San Diego.

== Ships of class ==
APL-2-class barracks ship
Name	Builders	Laid down	Launched	Commissioned	Decommissioned	Fate
APL-2	Puget Sound Navy Yard	12 May 1944	6 July 1944	25 May 1945	-	CincPacFlt Berthing and Messing Program and is berthed at San Diego
APL-3	Puget Sound Navy Yard	31 May 1944	3 August 1944	30 July 1945	-	Scrapped in 1974
APL-4	Puget Sound Navy Yard	27 May 1944	3 August 1944	21 September 1945	-	CincPacFlt Berthing and Messing Program and is berthed at San Diego
APL-5	Puget Sound Navy Yard	8 July 1944	14 November 1944	5 November 1945	-	CincPacFlt Berthing and Messing Program and is berthed at San Diego
APL-6	Puget Sound Navy Yard	5 August 1944	12 February 1945	Cancelled on 27 August 1945, completed as barge CROWN No.2		
APL-7	Puget Sound Navy Yard	5 August 1944	12 February 1945	Cancelled on 27 August 1945, completed as barge CROWN No.1		
APL-8	Nashville Bridge Co.	21 March 1944	5 June 1944	6 October 1944	-	Sold to commercial service as merchant barge MLC-261 (ON 580686), 1974
APL-9	Nashville Bridge Co.	5 May 1944	21 July 1944	24 November 1944	-	Sold to commercial service as merchant barge MLC-260 (ON 581255), 1974
APL-10	Nashville Bridge Co.	12 July 1944	19 September 1944	6 January 1945	-	Sold to commercial service as merchant barge MLC-263 (ON 561018), 1974
APL-11	Boston Navy Yard	5 August 1944	4 September 1944	10 October 1944	-	Sunk as target by ComNavAirPac, 18 March 1974
APL-12	Boston Navy Yard	5 August 1944	4 September 1944	24 October 1944	-	Destroyed on 26 January 1946
APL-13	Boston Navy Yard	5 September 1944	12 October 1944	20 November 1944	23 November 1945	Destroyed on 22 February 1946
APL-14	Nashville Bridge Co.	11 September 1944	17 January 1944	29 June 1944	3 January 1946	Sold to Foreign Liquidation Committee (FLC), May 1947
APL-15	Nashville Bridge Co.	29 October 1943	29 January 1944	1 August 1944	-	CincPacFlt Berthing and Messing Program and is berthed at San Diego
APL-16	Cancelled on 22 October 1943					

== See also ==
- Barracks ship
- List of auxiliaries of the United States Navy § Barracks Craft (APL)
