= APL-41-class barracks ship =

Class of United States Navy barrack ships

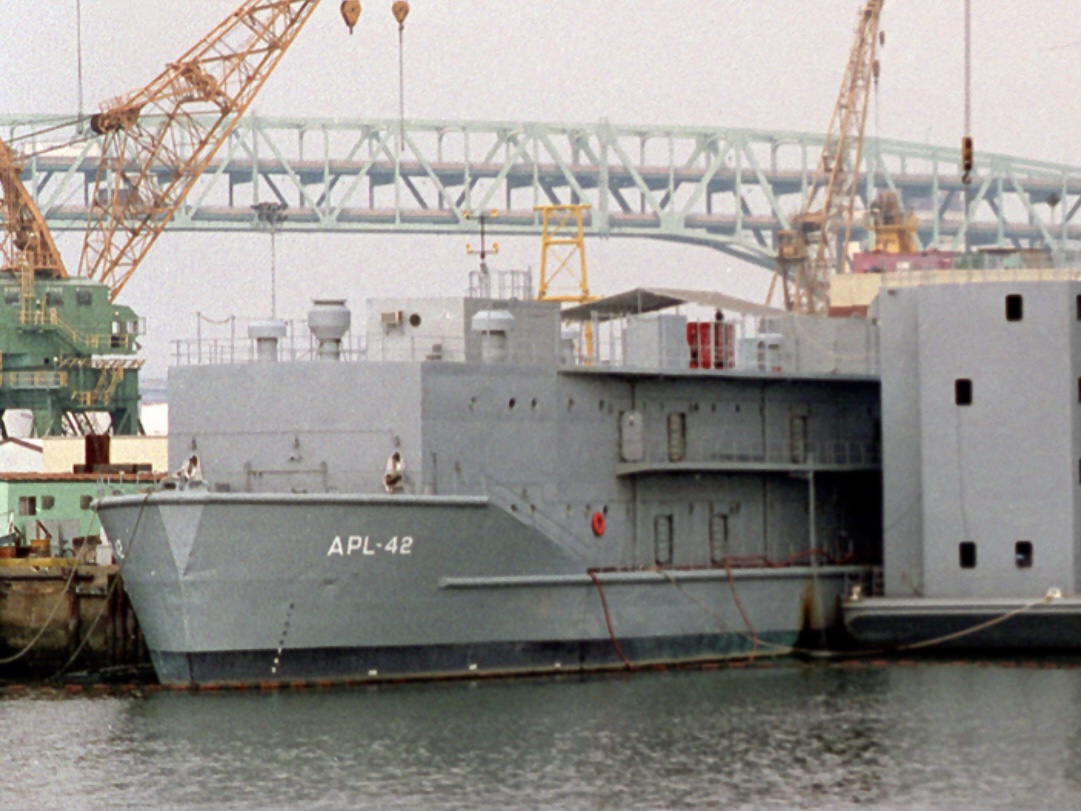
- USS APL-42

Class overview
- Name: APL-41 class
- Builders: Willamette Iron and Steel; Puget Sound Shipbuilding
- Operators: United States Navy; Turkish Navy
- Preceded by: APL-17 class
- Succeeded by: APL-53 class
- Built: 1944-1946
- In commission: 1945-1946
- Planned: 12
- Completed: 10
- Canceled: 2

General characteristics
- Type: Barracks ship
- Displacement: 1,300 t (1,279 long tons) (standard); 2,600 t (2,559 long tons) (full load)
- Length: 261 ft 0 in (79.55 m)
- Beam: 49 ft 2 in (14.99 m)
- Draft: 8 ft 6 in (2.59 m)
- Installed power: 100kW 450 AC
- Propulsion: 3 × Diesel generators
- Capacity: 0 officers; 583 enlisted; 1,000 Bbls (Diesel)
- Complement: 5 officers; 66 enlisted
- Armament: 4 × Oerlikon 20 mm cannons

The APL-41-class barracks ship was a class of barracks ships of the United States Navy after the Second World War, in the late 1940s.

== Development ==
Ten ships were built during World War II with 2 cancelled. Franklin D. Roosevelt approved the construction of tenders and repair ships in May 1943, it was then recommended by the Auxiliary Vessels Board on 11 June later that year, the construction of barracks ships.

The class consists of barges with a two-story barracks built on top instead of the a warehouse design, and they had an auxiliary vessel designation of "A". Moreover, on their top deck, 4 Oerlikon 20 mm cannons were placed together with 2 gun and their platforms on each side of the ship. The guns were later removed after being put into the reserve fleet in 1946.

In December 1972, APL-47 and APL-53 were loaned to Turkey. Since 2011, only 3 ships have been in service at Naval Station Norfolk.

== Ships of class ==
APL-41-class barracks ship
Name	Builders	Laid down	Launched	Commissioned	Decommissioned	Fate
APL-41	Willamette Iron and Steel	2 September 1944	11 November 1944	24 March 1945	-	Disposed on 17 May 1973
APL-42	Willamette Iron and Steel	9 December 1944	6 February 1945	1 May 1945	-	CincPacFlt Berthing and Messing Program and is berthed at Norfolk
APL-43	Willamette Iron and Steel	13 December 1944	27 February 1945	31 May 1945	-	Donated to Panama on 1 October 1993
APL-44	Willamette Iron and Steel	29 December 1944	30 April 1945	30 June 1945	-	Transferred to the U.S. Army District Engineers, 30 April 1960
APL-45	Willamette Iron and Steel	7 February 1945	12 May 1945	28 July 1945	-	CincPacFlt Berthing and Messing Program and is berthed at Norfolk
APL-46	Willamette Iron and Steel	28 February 1945	23 May 1945	31 August 1945	-	Scrapped in 1970
APL-47	Puget Sound Shipbuilding	17 October 1944	5 January 1945	1 June 1945	-	Loaned to Turkey and redesignated TCG Y38, December 1972
APL-48	Puget Sound Shipbuilding	8 November 1944	26 January 1945	26 July 1945	-	Sold to commercial service, August 1958
APL-49	Puget Sound Shipbuilding	28 November 1944	28 May 1945	15 November 1945	-	Transferred to the Thirteenth Naval District, 1961
APL-50	Puget Sound Shipbuilding	29 January 1945	26 July 1945	2 January 1946	-	CincPacFlt Berthing and Messing Program and is berthed at Norfolk
APL-51	Puget Sound Shipbuilding	15 May 1945	Cancelled on 13 August 1945, completed as barge PACIFIC RIM			
APL-52	Puget Sound Shipbuilding	Cancelled on 13 August 1945				

== See also ==
- Barracks ship
- List of auxiliaries of the United States Navy § Barracks Craft (APL)
