= Wyman H. Packard =

20th-century American naval officer and historian

Wyman H. Packard (1911-2002) was a United States Navy captain and historian, best known for his book A Century of U.S. Naval Intelligence.

== Background ==
Wyman Howard Packard was born on December 13, 1911, in Brockton, Massachusetts.

== Career ==
Packard served in the US Navy from 1931 to 1965 and reach the rank of captain. Duty stations included: USS Hornet (CV-8), Assistant Operations Officer COMSOTAC, Assistant (and Deputy) Director in the Office of Naval Intelligence, COF Staff (Intel) CINCPACFLT, and Assistant Naval Attaché in London.

== Personal life and death ==
Packard married Margaret Henderson Packard in 1937. They had two children together, Sara and Robert. Margaret died in 1995, three years after their daughter, Sara.

Packard went on to remarry Ruth Wordell and he adopted her two children.

Wyman H. Packard died on September 12, 2002, in McLean, Virginia, and was buried at Arlington National Cemetery.

== Legacy ==
Aside from his service, Packard's book A Century of U.S. Naval Intelligence is a reliable source for military historians.

== Awards ==
- Legion of Merit (1966)
- Purple Heart
- Bronze Star Medal
- Asiatic-Pacific Campaign Medal (4 Stars)
- World War II Victory Medal

== Works ==
Books

- A Century of U.S. Naval Intelligence (1994)

Articles

- "Notes on the Early History of Naval Intelligence in the United States," ONI Review (1957)
- "The Naval Attaché," U.S. Naval Institute Proceedings (1965)
- "Intelligence and the Navy," Naval Review (1968)
- "The History of ONI," Naval Intelligence Professionals Quarterly (4 parts 1987-1988)
- "The Origins of Naval Intelligence Professionals," Naval Intelligence Professionals Quarterly (1989)
