= USS APL-45 =

Barracks ship of the United States Navy

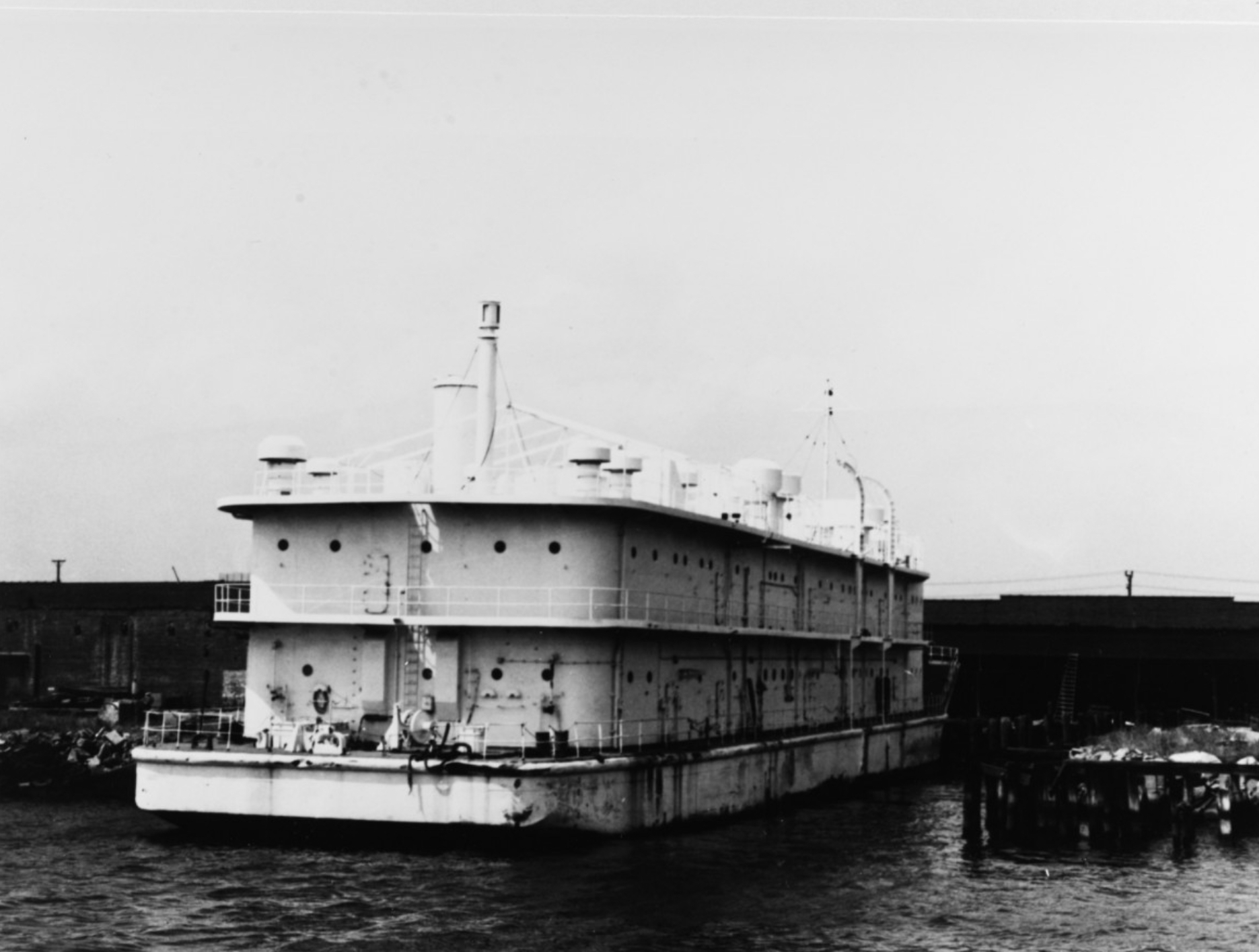
- APL-45

History

United States
- Name: APL-45
- Ordered: 19 July 1944
- Builder: Willamette Iron and Steel Works
- Laid down: 7 February 1945
- Launched: 12 May 1945
- Acquired: 28 July 1945
- Commissioned: 28 July 1945
- Decommissioned: January 1947
- Stricken: 1 November 1972
- Reinstated: 1974
- Home port: Norfolk
- Identification: Hull number: APL-45
- Honors and awards: See Awards
- Status: Berthed in Norfolk

General characteristics
- Class & type: APL-41-class barracks ship
- Displacement: 1,300 t (1,279 long tons) (standard); 2,600 t (2,559 long tons) (full load)
- Length: 261 ft 0 in (79.55 m)
- Beam: 49 ft 2 in (14.99 m)
- Draft: 8 ft 6 in (2.59 m)
- Installed power: 100kW 450 AC
- Propulsion: 3 × Diesel generators
- Capacity: 0 officers; 583 enlisted; 1,000 Bbls (Diesel)
- Complement: 5 officers; 66 enlisted

USS APL-45 is an APL-41-class barracks ship of the United States Navy.

== Construction and career ==
The ship was laid down on 7 February 1945, by the Willamette Iron and Steel Works and launched on 12 May 1945. She was commissioned on 28 July 1945.

She was decommissioned and put into the reserve fleet by January 1947.

The ship undertook the CincPacFlt Berthing and Messing Program, in which she is berthed in Norfolk since at least the early 2000s. She is being used as a berthing and messing barge.

== Awards ==
- American Campaign Medal
- World War II Victory Medal
