= USS Eagle (1898) =

Gunboat of the United States Navy

History

United States
- Name: USS Eagle
- Builder: Harlan and Hollingsworth, Wilmington, Delaware
- Launched: 1890
- Acquired: by purchase, 2 April 1898
- Commissioned: 5 April 1898
- Decommissioned: 23 May 1919
- Fate: Sold, 3 January 1920

General characteristics
- Type: Gunboat
- Displacement: 434 long tons (441 t)
- Length: 177 ft (54 m)
- Beam: 24 ft (7.3 m)
- Draft: 11 ft 6 in (3.51 m)
- Speed: 12 kn (14 mph; 22 km/h)
- Complement: 67 officers and enlisted
- Armament: 2 × 6-pounder (57 mm (2.24 in)) guns

The fifth USS Eagle served in the United States Navy from 1898 to 1919, and saw action in the Spanish–American War and service during World War I.

Eagle, a yacht, was built in 1890 as Almy by Harlan and Hollingsworth, Wilmington, Delaware; purchased by the Navy on 2 April 1898 and renamed Eagle; and commissioned three days later, Lieutenant William Henry Hudson Southerland in command.

== Service history ==
=== Spanish–American War ===
Eagle sailed from New York on 17 April 1898 for duty with the North Atlantic Squadron on blockade and dispatch duty in Cuban waters. On 29 June, she shelled the Spanish battery at Rio Honda and on 12 July captured the Spanish merchantman Santo Domingo. Eagle returned to Norfolk on 22 August to be fitted out for surveying duty, her principal employment through the remainder of her naval service. She compiled new charts and corrected existing ones for the waters surrounding Cuba, Puerto Rico, and Haiti.

=== Pre-World War I ===
Troubled conditions throughout the Caribbean often interrupted Eagle's surveying duty and she gave varied service in protecting American interests. She patrolled off Haiti in January–February 1908 and again in November and December and off Nicaragua in December 1909. In June 1912, she transported Marines to Santiago de Cuba and Siboney to protect American lives and property during a rebellion in Cuba, and continued to investigate conditions and serve as base ship for the Marines until 1914. She also had gunboat duty with a cruiser squadron during the Haiti operation of July 1915 – March 1916, and was commended by the Secretary of the Navy for her creditable performance of widely varied duty. She then remained off Haiti to conduct surveys.

=== World War I ===
With American entry into World War I, Eagle returned to Cuban waters. She was attached to American Patrol Detachment, Atlantic Fleet, and throughout 1917–1918 was continually on patrol off Cuba, Santo Domingo, and the southern coast of the United States. From Key West, Florida, where she arrived on 3 April 1918, she patrolled the Florida Straits and after the end of the war operated on target practice, and tactical exercises and maneuvers. From 7 January – 15 March 1919, she made a cruise to Cuban ports and along the Gulf coast before being detached from the American Patrol Detachment on 28 April. Eagle left Key West the following day for Portsmouth Navy Yard. She was decommissioned there on 23 May and sold on 3 January 1920.
