= Sylvester R. Foley Jr. =

American admiral (1928–2019)

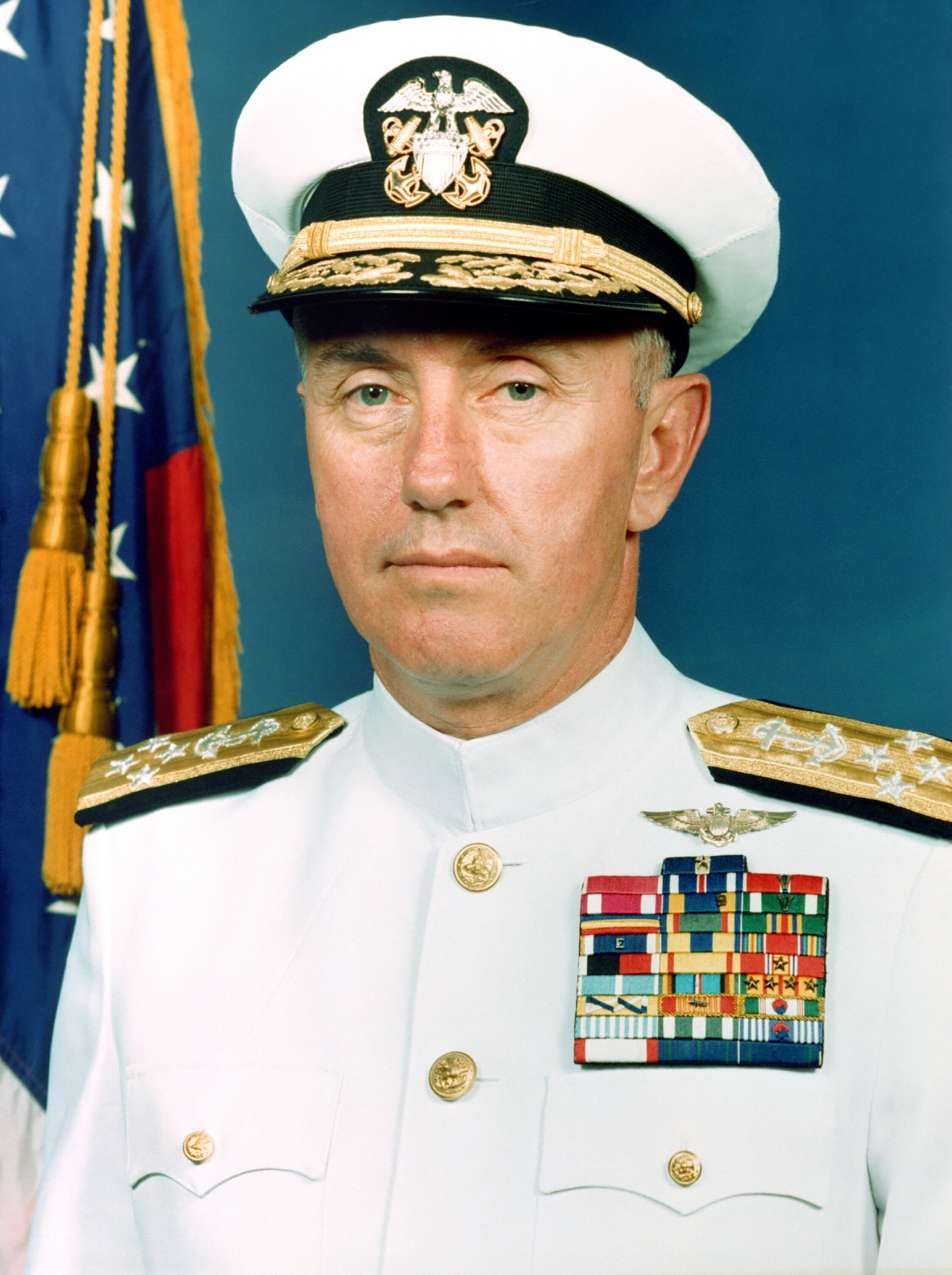
- Born: September 19, 1928; Manchester, New Hampshire, U.S.
- Died: December 31, 2019 (aged 91); Chester, Maryland, U.S.
- Burial place: U.S. Naval Academy Cemetery, Annapolis, Maryland, U.S.
- Military career
- Allegiance: United States
- Branch: United States Navy
- Service years: 1950–1985
- Rank: Admiral
- Nickname: Bob
- Commands: Seventh Fleet; U.S. Pacific Fleet; U.S. Atlantic Command
- Awards: Navy Distinguished Service Medal; French Legion of Honor; Order of the Rising Sun

Sylvester Robert "Bob" Foley Jr. (September 19, 1928 – December 31, 2019) was a four star admiral in the United States Navy who served as the commander-in-chief of the US Pacific Fleet from 1982 to 1985.

== Early life ==
Foley was born in Manchester, New Hampshire. He graduated from the United States Naval Academy in 1950.

== Military career ==
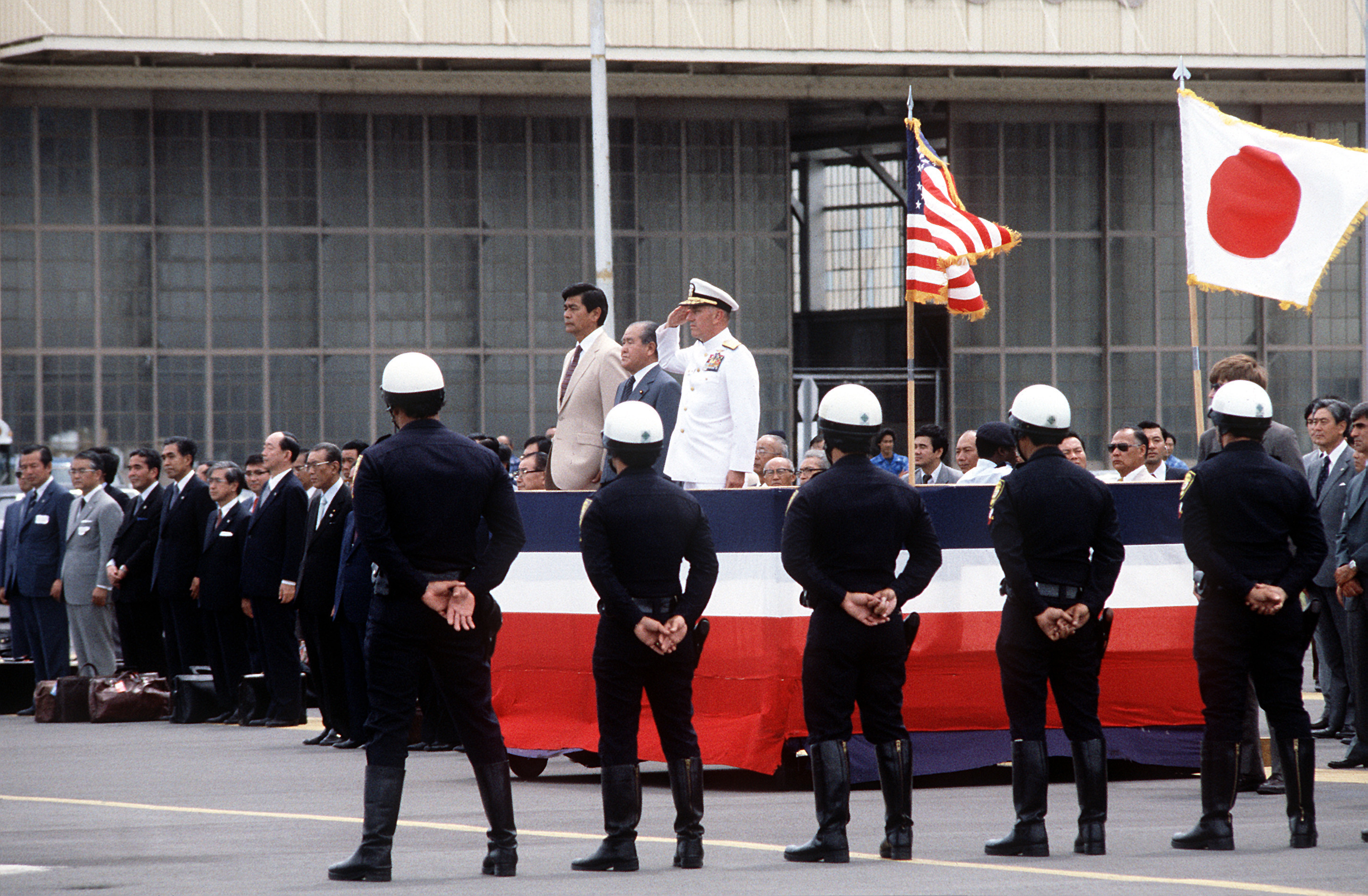
Governor of Hawaii George Ariyoshi, Japanese Prime Minister Zenkō Suzuki, and Admiral Foley at a ceremony at Hickam Air Force Base in 1982 during his time as Commander, U.S. Pacific Fleet

After graduating as a member of the United States Naval Academy's class of 1950, Foley served in the Navy for 35 years. Foley quickly rose through the ranks and held several operational commands during his distinguished naval career. From May 31, 1978 to February 14, 1980, Foley served as commander of the US Seventh Fleet. From May 28, 1982 to September 16, 1985, Foley served as Commander, U.S. Pacific Fleet.

== Retirement from military ==
Foley retired from the Navy in 1985, at which point he served as President Ronald Reagan's assistant secretary of energy for defense programs, where he had responsibility for the nation's nuclear weapons complex.

In 1988, Foley entered the private sector and was named president of the Advanced Technology Group at ICF Kaiser Engineers. In 1991, he joined the Raytheon Company, where he served as vice president of marketing, president of Raytheon Japan, and vice president of Asian operations.

After retiring from Raytheon, Foley served as a consultant to the departments of defense and energy and was a member of President George W. Bush's energy transition team.

In 2003, Foley was appointed the University of California's vice president for laboratory management. In his role, Foley has responsibility for the university's oversight and management at three national laboratories: Los Alamos, Lawrence Livermore, and Lawrence Berkeley.

== Personal life and death ==
Foley earned a master's degree in international affairs from George Washington University in 1968. Additionally, Foley graduated from the Naval War College in 1968 and was recognized as a Distinguished Graduate of the Air War College.

Foley died at his home in Maryland on December 31, 2019, at the age of 91.

== Awards and decorations ==

Naval Aviator Badge
Navy Distinguished Service Medal with one gold award star
Legion of Merit	Distinguished Flying Cross	Bronze Star with Combat V
Meritorious Service Medal	Air Medal with bronze Strike/Flight numeral 9	Navy and Marine Corps Commendation Medal with Combat V
Navy Presidential Unit Citation	Navy Unit Commendation	Navy Meritorious Unit Commendation
Department of Energy, Secretary's Gold Medal for distinguished service	Navy "E" Ribbon	Navy Expeditionary Medal
World War II Victory Medal	Navy Occupation Service Medal	China Service Medal
National Defense Service Medal with one bronze service star	Korean Service Medal	Armed Forces Expeditionary Medal
Vietnam Service Medal with four service stars	Vietnam Navy Distinguished Service Order, 2nd class	Order of National Security Merit, 2nd Class (Republic of Korea)
Order of the Cloud and Banner, 2nd class (Republic of China)	Order of the Rising Sun, Grand Cordon (Japan)	Legion of Honour, degree unknown (France)
Vietnam Gallantry Cross Unit Citation	Korean Presidential Unit Citation	United Nations Korea Medal
Vietnam Campaign Medal	Navy Rifle Marksmanship Ribbon	Navy Pistol Marksmanship Ribbon
Office of the Joint Chiefs of Staff Identification Badge
