= Edward B. Barry =

United States Navy admiral (1849–1938)

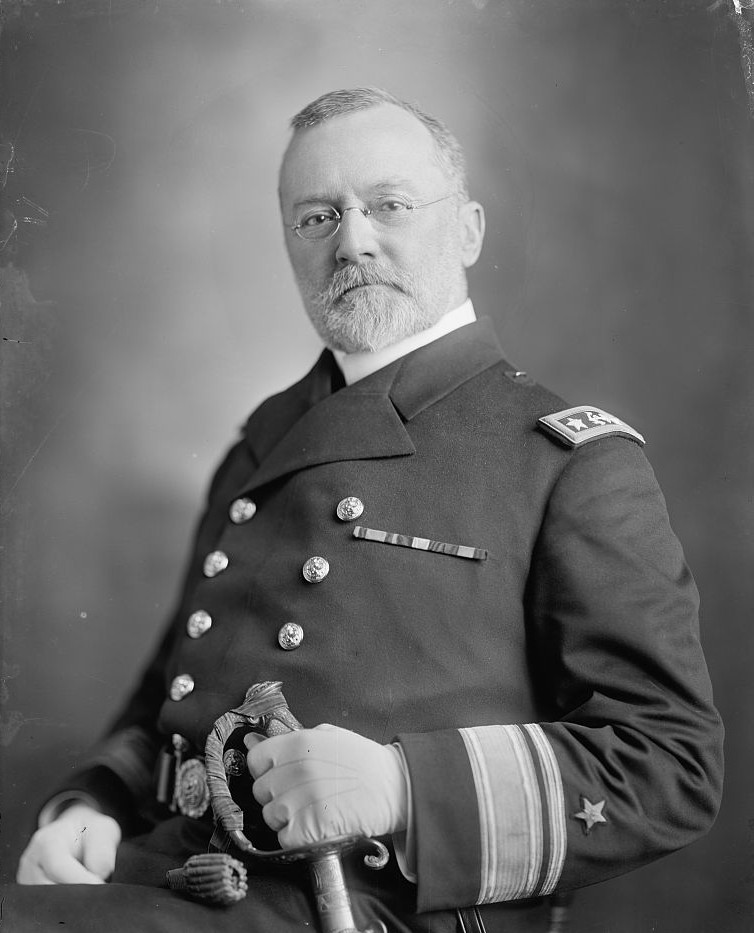
- Born: October 20, 1849; New York City, U.S.
- Died: November 27, 1938 (aged 89) Baltimore, Maryland, U.S.
- Buried: Arlington National Cemetery
- Branch: United States Navy
- Service years: 1865–1911
- Rank: Rear admiral
- Commands: United States Pacific Fleet; USS Kentucky (BB-6); USS Vicksburg (PG-11)
- Conflicts: Spanish–American War; Puerto Rico campaign; Philippine–American War

Edward Buttevant Barry (Note: Barry's middle name is occasionally given as Buttervant.) (October 20, 1849 – November 27, 1938) was a rear admiral in the United States Navy. A popular and mostly successful sailor, Barry took part in the Spanish–American and Philippine–American wars and commanded various ships, including the USS Vicksburg and USS Kentucky.

In November 1910, Barry was appointed as Commander-in-Chief, U.S. Pacific Fleet. He served there until January 1911, when a scandal erupted due to his suspected homosexuality. Despite his request for an early retirement being accepted, pressure from his subordinates and President William Howard Taft led Barry to resign "for the good of the service".

== Early life ==
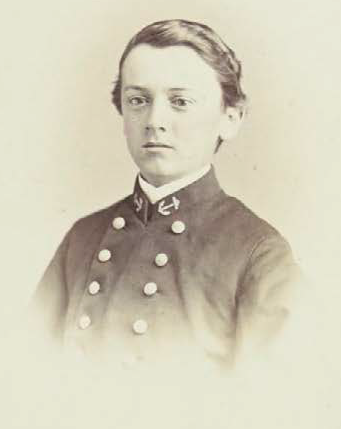
Aged sixteen at the end of his plebe year in the United States Naval Academy

Edward B. Barry was born on October 20, 1849, as the second son in an Irish Catholic family in New York City. His father, Garrett Robert Barry, was a successful Navy purser, who served as paymaster for the New York Navy Yard (now the Brooklyn Navy Yard) during the American Civil War. He studied at St. Francis Xavier College in New York City before entering the United States Naval Academy on July 21, 1865, through being an officer's son. Barry's stay at the naval academy was mediocre, being demerited for various incidents, including "very disorderly humming" and reading a newspaper during fencing lessons. Nevertheless, following three practice cruises aboard the USS Macedonian and USS Savannah, Barry graduated on June 4, 1869, 48th in his 74-man class.

== Naval career ==
=== Early career ===
A year following his graduation to midshipman in 1869, Barry was promoted to ensign. Following a special cruise aboard the USS Sabine, his first mission was aboard USS Worcester, delivering humanitarian supplies to France during the Franco-Prussian War. Despite his undistinguished performance in the naval academy, Barry proved to be a capable officer, rapidly rising through the ranks of the Navy. In 1875, Barry was selected for a position on a board reorganizing the Navy training system, a role considered impressive for a 26-year-old officer.

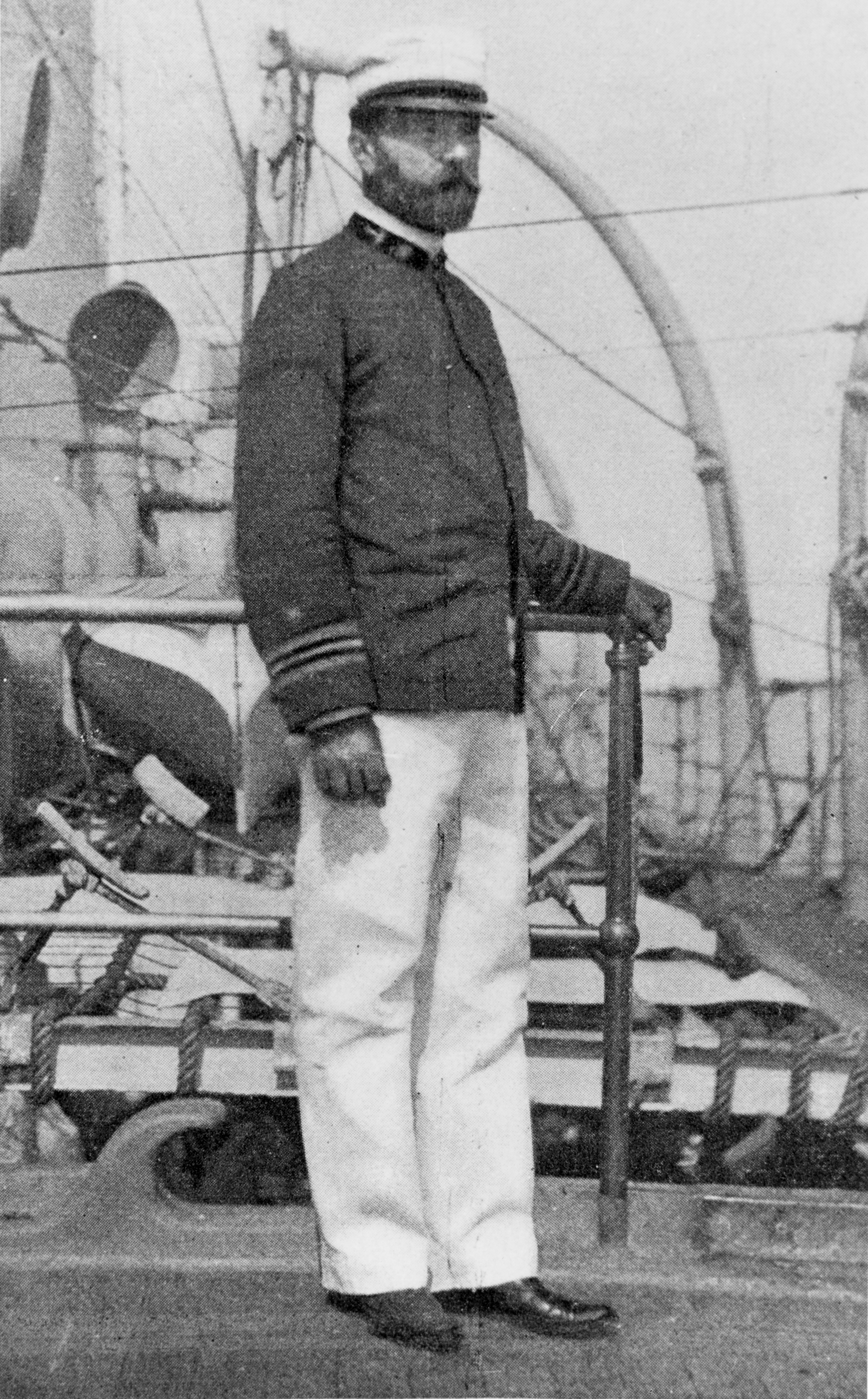
Barry aboard the Cincinnati in 1898

Barry was aboard the USS Alaska during the blockade of Callao in 1880, witnessing the scuttling of Peruvian Navy ships Unión and Loa. Following various stints in the Asiatic Squadron, South Atlantic Squadron, and the Office of Naval Intelligence, war with Spain was looming. In 1897 Barry was promoted to lieutenant commander, and on August 2 of that year was transferred to the USS Cincinnati, serving as her executive officer. He took part in the United States' first attack of the Spanish–American War on April 27, 1898, bombarding Spanish artillery batteries at the entrance of the harbor of Matanzas. Barry took part in the blockades of Havana and Puerto Rico, as well as negotiating with Manuel Macías y Casado, the Governor-General of Puerto Rico, for an armistice.

=== As commanding officer ===
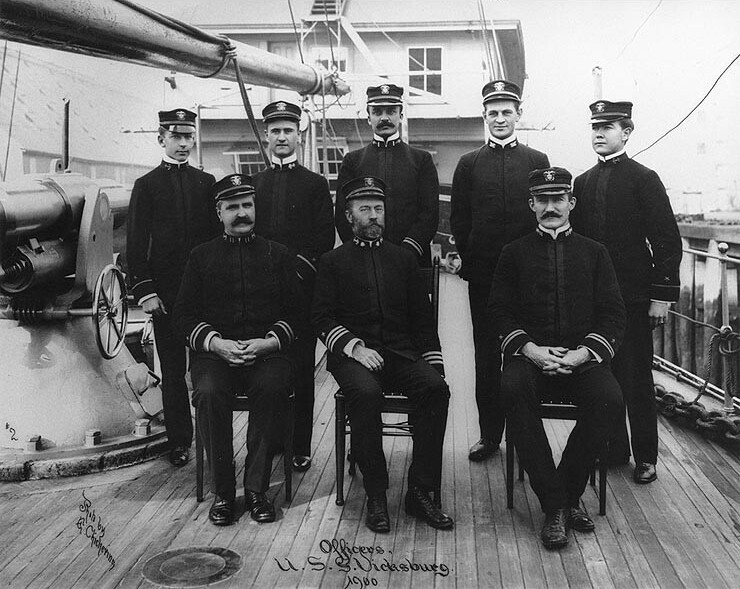
Officers of the Vicksburg in 1900. Barry is seated in the middle.

Following the end of the war, Barry was assigned his first command role aboard the collier USS Marcellus, stationed in the New York Navy Yard. Shortly after, he was promoted to commander, and in March 1900 took command of the recently recommissioned USS Vicksburg, taking her on a short spell in the Atlantic before moving to the Asiatic station. In the Philippine–American War, Barry's Vicksburg took part in an expedition to Palawan, led by Frederick Funston, in order to capture Filipino president Emilio Aguinaldo. The mission was a major success, with the capture being made on March 23, 1901. Five days later, the Vicksburg returned to U.S.-held Malacañang Palace with Funston and Aguinaldo on board. The accomplishment further strengthened Barry's reputation, and he was commended by General Arthur MacArthur Jr. for his conduct in the operation.

After the conclusion of the war, Vicksburg switched her focus to East Asia, moving between China, Japan, and Korea. In January 1902, while docked at Nieu-Chwang (now Yingkou), multiple fights erupted between garrisoned Russian soldiers and American sailors from the Vicksburg, leading to Russian ambassador to China Paul M. Lessar submitting a complaint to his American counterpart Edwin H. Conger. Following further investigation by Barry, he came to the conclusion the Russian garrison was at fault, and demanded reparation from Russia, with an apology being subsequently given.

On April 15, 1903, Barry returned to the New York Navy Yard as aide to commandant Frederick Rodgers. With Rodgers's retirement in October 1904, Barry departed his role too, being replaced by Lieutenant Commander Benjamin Tappan. He then served as a member of the Board of Inspection and Survey. Following the retirement of Rear Admiral A.S. Barker, Barry was promoted to captain on March 31, 1905. Shortly thereafter Barry returned to command, succeeding Captain William J. Barnette as commander of the battleship USS Kentucky. On leaving the yard, the Brooklyn Eagle wrote that "with the departure for Norfolk of the battleship Kentucky to-morrow morning, one of the best liked officers who have ever did duty there will leave the Navy Yard".

Unlike on Vicksburg, Barry's performance on the Kentucky was uninspiring. Only a week after taking command of the ship, on January 7, the Kentucky was exiting Tompkinsville in a fleet with four other ships when she ran aground. The blunder created a chain reaction effect, with the following USS Kearsarge intentionally grounding herself, before the ensuing USS Alabama delivered a glancing blow to Kentucky. There was initial belief Barry would be completely absolved from blame due to his reputation as an excellent navigator. Nonetheless, Barry was blamed for a "slight mistake" during Kentucky's grounding, with the majority of the fault going to an "incompetent helmsman". Following a lackluster stint in command, Barry was eventually ordered to relinquish command of the ship to then-Captain Walter C. Cowles. Shortly before the passing of the torch, Barry's Kentucky again ran aground, this time near Lambert's Point. On November 1, 1907, Barry left the Kentucky to manage the largest Naval Recruiting Station, headquartered in New York City. The Kentucky, under the command of Cowles, would go on to be part of the notable Great White Fleet just a month after Barry's detachment.

In December, Barry departed the recruiting station and became the supervisor of the naval auxiliaries of the Atlantic coast. There he participated in multiple inquiries, including the court-martial of Commander Charles C. Marsh, who accidentally led to the sinking of USS Yankee. Following the retirement of Rear Admiral William J. Barnette, Barry was promoted to rear admiral on February 1, 1909. A few months later, despite initially being promised command of the fourth division of the United States Atlantic Fleet, Barry was reassigned to command the second division of the United States Pacific Fleet after the division's predecessor, Rear Admiral Uriel Sebree, became Commander-in-Chief, U.S. Pacific Fleet.

=== Commander-in-Chief, U.S. Pacific Fleet ===
Barry was promoted to Commander-in-Chief, U.S. Pacific Fleet (CINCPACFLT) on November 1, 1910, with the USS West Virginia serving as his flagship. He succeeded the retiring rear admiral, Giles B. Harber, and immediately left for battle practice. Barry's time as commander-in-chief of the fleet was short-lived. His notable actions included being bitten by an English Bull Terrier named "Bunk" who served as mascot of the USS Colorado and communicating with Glenn Curtiss regarding a possible naval aviation experiment. (Bunk apologized with a lick and was subsequently let off without reprimand).

On January 14, 1911, Barry made an unexpected request for retirement nine months before he was set to pass the mandatory retirement age. Initial speculation for the early timing was due to ill-health, but this was quickly dissipated the following day when the San Francisco Chronicle reported on Barry's officers discovering him a week before in a situation "of such a nature as to forbid explicit statement in print". Barry's suspected homosexuality was not explicitly reported in the newspapers, which instead referred to the matter as "concerning his moral character" and "the same vice which caused the downfall of Oscar Wilde". His sexual orientation was already suspected for months and he was shunned by his officers during his time on the West Virginia. The officers considered sending a loaded revolver to Barry's room with a suggestion to use it before settling on allowing him the opportunity to resign. Barry moved to voluntarily retire rather than resign, a choice the officers considered unacceptable. After increasing pressure and a request from President William Howard Taft, on January 28 Barry resigned from the navy "for the good of the service", forgoing his pension.

== Personal life ==
Edward B. Barry married Mary J. Clitz, daughter of Navy officer John M. B. Clitz, on April 7, 1875. The couple had a son, born in 1876, and a daughter in 1877. Mary died in Washington, D.C., on June 25, 1906. Barry died aged 89 in Baltimore on November 27, 1938, after returning to his room following a church service. Following a service in St. Ignatius Church, Barry was buried in Arlington National Cemetery on November 29. He was a member of the University Club of New York and Army and Navy Club.

Barry's signature

Barry's signature and penmanship were frequent targets of teasing during his time in the navy yard. The Brooklyn Daily Eagle wrote a piece titled "Naval Academy Enrolls [Barry] as the Only Student Who Couldn't Read His Own Writing", and labelled his signature as the "weirdest in the Navy".

Poet T. S. Eliot referred to Barry twice in letters to Ezra Pound, the first dated August 30, 1922.

For below a voice did answer, sweet in its youthful tone,
The sea-dog with difficulty descended, for he had a manly bone.

And the second three weeks later, dated October 22.

In old Manila harbour, the Yankee wardogs lay,
The stars and stripes streamed overhead, & the band began to play;
The band struck up the strains of the old Salvation Rag,
And from the ~~quarter~~ mizzentop there flew REAR ADMIRAL BARRY's flag.

== Dates of rank ==
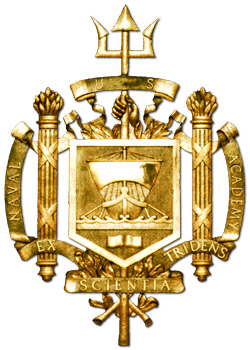
United States Naval Academy Midshipman – June 4, 1869

| Ensign | Master | Lieutenant | Lieutenant commander |
| O-1 | O-2 | O-3 | O-4 |
| July 12, 1870 | January 29, 1872 | April 6, 1875 | March 21, 1897 |

| Commander | Captain | Commodore | Rear admiral |
| O-5 | O-6 | O-7 | O-8 |
| March 9, 1900 | March 31, 1905 | Never held (Note: The rank of Commodore did not exist from 1899–1943) | February 1, 1909 (Note: The modern rear admiral (lower half) rank did not exist during Barry's lifetime) |

== Notes ==
Military offices
| Preceded by Giles B. Harber | Commander-in-Chief of the U.S. Pacific Fleet; November 10, 1910 – January 15, 1911 | Succeeded by Chauncey Thomas Jr. |
