= Chauncey Thomas Jr. =

United States Navy admiral (1850–1919)

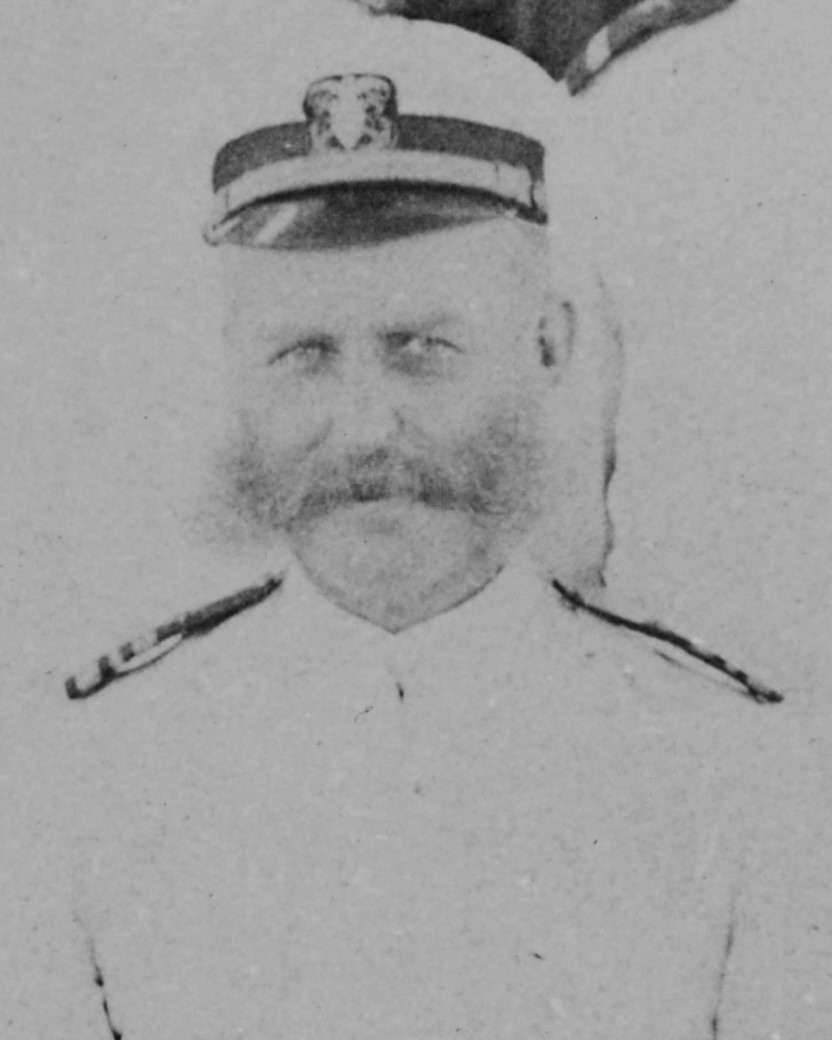
- As a lieutenant commander in 1899
- Born: 27 April 1850; Barryville, New York
- Died: 9 May 1919 (aged 69); Pacific Grove, California
- Relatives: Chauncey Thomas (father)
- Military career
- Allegiance: United States
- Branch: United States Navy
- Service years: 1871–1912
- Rank: Rear Admiral
- Commands: Monadnock; Albatross; Bennington; Maryland; 2nd Squadron, Pacific Fleet; U.S. Pacific Fleet
- Conflicts: Philippine–American War

Chauncey Thomas Jr. (27 April 1850 – 9 May 1919) was a rear admiral of the United States Navy. The son of Chauncey Thomas, a farmer and entrepreneur, who built four bridges across the Delaware River at Shohola Glen, Pennsylvania, Thomas Jr., graduated from the United States Naval Academy third in the class of 1871. He was the Commander of the United States Pacific Fleet when he retired in 1912. He died at the age of 69 at his home in Pacific Grove, California.

== The Albatross expedition ==
Chauncey Thomas, as captain, commanded the US Fish Commission steamer, Albatross during a scientific expedition in the Hawaiian Islands and southern Pacific in 1902. Orders issued at the onset of the expedition made it unclear where ultimate authority in the expedition lay, with the ship's captain, or the scientist-in-charge, Charles Henry Gilbert (1859–1929). Before leaving port, Thomas requested clarification, which he received, confirming the norm: that the ship's captain always had ultimate authority regarding the safety of the crew and the ship. The expedition proceeded, but was marred by a barrage of complaints that pitted the scientific crew against the ship's crew, and was characterized by lengthy letters.

== Career ==
Born in Barryville, New York and raised in Pennsylvania, Thomas served aboard multiple ships as a junior officer. He also had shore assignments in both the Nautical Almanac Office and the Hydrographic Office at the Navy Department in Washington, D.C. Thomas did not see action during the Spanish–American War, instead patrolling Alaskan waters aboard the gunboat Wheeling. He did participate in several engagements during the Philippine–American War while serving as executive officer aboard the gunboat Yorktown.

Thomas held a variety of commands in the United States Navy. He was promoted to lieutenant commander in March 1899 and given command of the monitor Monadnock. Thomas was promoted to commander in September 1901 and given command of the Albatross. For 27 months, he was commanding officer of the gunboat Bennington, which cruised in the eastern Pacific along the coasts of North and South America Alaskan ports in the summer of 1903 and the coast of Central America the following fall and winter. Thomas was promoted to captain in July 1906. From 1907 to 1908, he commanded the armored cruiser Maryland.

=== Rear Admiral ===
Thomas was promoted to rear admiral in March 1910. As commander of the Second Squadron of the Pacific Fleet, he relieved Rear Admiral Edward B. Barry as Commander in Chief of the Pacific Fleet in January 1911 upon orders of the Naval Department. Admiral Barry was forced to resign after an alleged affair with a cabin boy.

== Family and residence ==
On 12 September 1876, Thomas married Carrie Ella Flagg.

In 1895, Chauncey Thomas purchased the property known as Hitching Post Hill, an early 19th-century horse farm in Prince George's County, Maryland.

== Namesake ==
Camp Thomas, formed in 1910 as a base for the 4th Marine Regiment, was named for him. The Regiment was deployed there against the possibility of the disorder in Mexico spreading to Southern California. Camp Thomas disbanded in June, 1911.

Military offices
Preceded by Edward B. Barry	Commander-in-Chief of the U.S. Pacific Fleet; January 15, 1911 – March 1912	Succeeded by William Henry Hudson Southerland
