= Walter Doran =

United States admiral (born 1945)

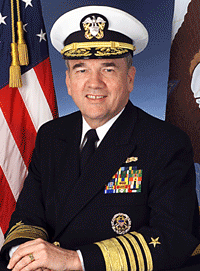
- Born: October 15, 1945 (age 81); Albany, New York, U.S.
- Military career
- Allegiance: United States of America
- Branch: United States Navy
- Service years: 1967 - 2005
- Rank: Admiral
- Nickname: Walt
- Commands: Seventh Fleet; U.S. Pacific Fleet
- Awards: Defense Distinguished Service Medal (2); Navy Distinguished Service Medal (2); Legion of Merit (5)

Walter Francis Doran (born October 15, 1945) is a retired admiral in the United States Navy, who served as the commander in chief, United States Pacific Fleet (CINCPACFLT) from May 2002 to July 2005. He lives with his wife, and has two sons. He currently is Raytheon's president of Asia.

== Navy career ==
A native of Albany, New York, Doran attended Villanova University where he earned a Bachelor of Arts Degree in history. He was commissioned as an ensign in 1967 through the Navy's Reserve Officer Training Corps (U.S. Navy) Program. In 1979, Admiral Doran attended the Indian Defense Services Staff College in Wellington, India, where he earned a master's degree in Defense Studies. He describes this experience in India as "serendipitously important" as he attended the Staff College with men who would later come to serve in high-ranking positions within their respective governments, among them former Indian CNS Arun Prakash and his successor. Admiral Doran also holds a master's degree in communications from the University of Oklahoma, which he received in 1983.

Selected to Flag rank in January, 1993, Doran served as director, operations, Plans and Political-Military (N-31/52) on the staff of the chief of naval operations and as the assistant to the chairman, Joint Chiefs of Staff from September 2000 to May 2002.

Doran commanded the USS De Wert (FFG-45) and the USS Belknap (CG-26), flagship for the United States Sixth Fleet home ported in Gaeta, Italy. From June 1995 to December 1996, Doran served as commander of Amphibious Group One in and the Amphibious Force U.S. Seventh Fleet, both homeported out of Okinawa, Japan. He also served as deputy commander in chief and chief of staff, United States Southern Command from December 1996 through July 1998. From August 1998 to September 2000, Doran commanded United States Seventh Fleet homeported out of Yokosuka, Japan.

Significant shore assignments include tours on the staff of the chief of naval operations in Washington, D.C., including assistant branch head, Pacific Ocean Area/Pacific Plans and Policy Branch (OP-612C) and branch head, Europe/NATO Branch (OP-614). From June, 1983 to July, 1985, Doran was military assistant to the then vice president of the United States George H. W. Bush.

== Awards and decorations ==
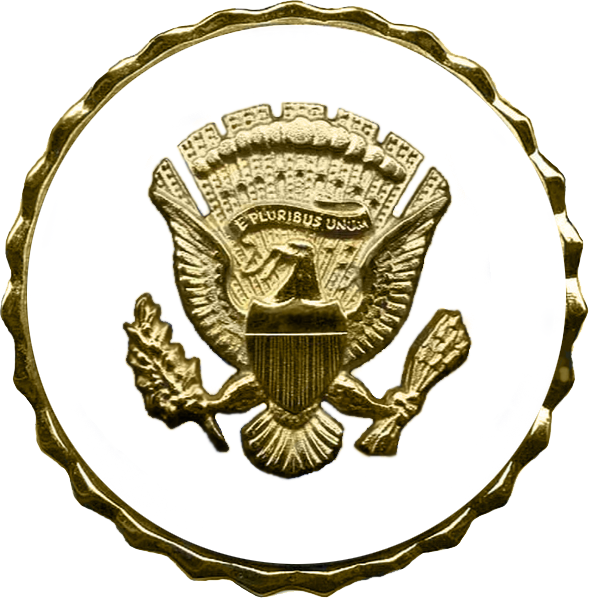
Navy Surface Warfare Officer Pin
Office of the Joint Chiefs of Staff Identification Badge
Vice Presidential Service Badge

Defense Distinguished Service Medal with one bronze oak leaf cluster
Navy Distinguished Service Medal with one gold award star
Legion of Merit with four award stars
Navy Commendation Medal with Combat V
Navy Achievement Medal with award star
Navy Unit Commendation
Navy Meritorious Unit Commendation with one bronze service star
Navy "E" Ribbon with three Battle E awards
Navy Expeditionary Medal
National Defense Service Medal with service star
Vietnam Service Medal with four service stars
Southwest Asia Service Medal
Navy Sea Service Deployment Ribbon with three service stars
Vietnam Gallantry Cross Unit Citation
NATO Medal for the former Yugoslavia
Inter-American Defense Board Medal
Vietnam Campaign Medal
Kuwait Liberation Medal (Kuwait)

== Post-military career ==
In 2005, Doran was appointed to Navy Service Executive for Raytheon Company. Since that time, he has become president of Raytheon Asia. Doran has concentrated a significant portion of his Raytheon work in fostering and developing the company's sales to India.

In 2014, Doran was elected to the Military Officers Association of America board of directors. That organization has approximately 350,000 members, made up of active duty, retired, and former commissioned officers and warrant officers who served in a uniformed services of the United States. In October 2018, Doran became chairman of the Military Officers Association's board of directors. He has also served on the Military Child Education Coalition board of directors and the U.S.-India Business Council board of directors.
