= USS Southerland =

Gearing-class destroyer

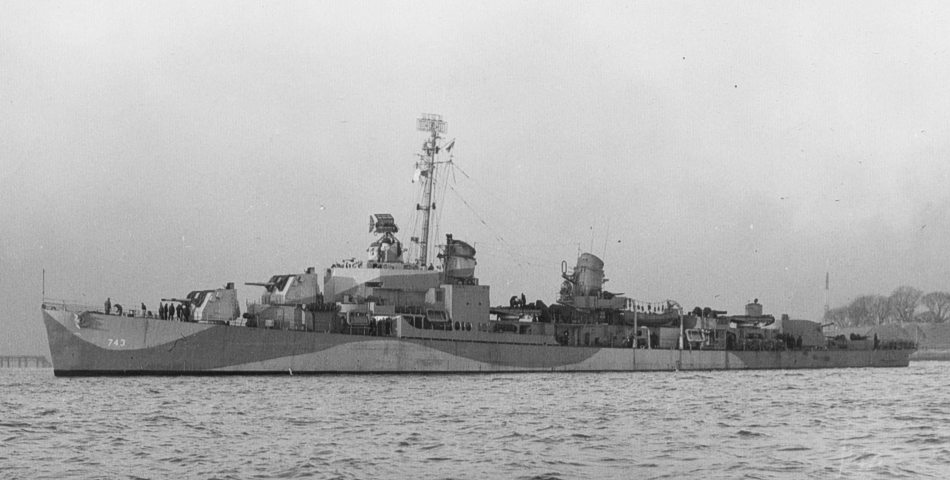
- USS Southerland (DD-743)

History

United States
- Name: USS Southerland
- Namesake: William Henry Hudson Southerland
- Builder: Bath Iron Works, Bath, Maine
- Laid down: 27 May 1944
- Launched: 5 October 1944
- Commissioned: 22 December 1944
- Reclassified: 18 March 1949 (DDR-743); 1 April 1964 (DD-743)
- Modernized: October 1964 (FRAM IB)
- Decommissioned: 26 February 1981
- Stricken: 23 February 1981
- Home port: San Diego, California
- Honors and awards: 1 battle star (World War II); 8 battle stars (Korea); 10 campaign stars (Vietnam)
- Fate: Sunk as a target, 2 August 1997

General characteristics
- Class & type: Gearing-class destroyer
- Displacement: 2,425 long tons (2,464 t)
- Length: 390 ft 6 in (119.02 m)
- Beam: 41 ft 1 in (12.52 m)
- Draft: 18 ft 6 in (5.64 m)
- Speed: 34.5 knots (63.9 km/h; 39.7 mph)
- Complement: 367
- Armament: 6 × 5 in (127 mm)/38 caliber guns; 16 × 40 mm AA guns; 10 × 21 inch (533 mm) torpedo tubes; 6 × depth charge projectors; 2 × depth charge tracks

USS Southerland (DD-743), a Gearing-class destroyer, was the only ship of the United States Navy to be named for William Henry Hudson Southerland, an admiral.

Southerland was laid down on 27 May 1944 by the Bath Iron Works, Bath, Maine and launched on 5 October 1944; sponsored by Mrs. Edmund Richardson, daughter of Rear Admiral Southerland. The destroyer was commissioned on 22 December 1944. The ship served at the end of the Second World War as a radar defence picket and then saw service across most of the mid 20th century, including operations in the Korean War and Vietnam War.

== Service history ==
=== World War II, 1945 ===
Southerland completed shakedown in the Bermuda area in February 1945 and conducted further exercises into April. On 24 April she rendezvoused with TU 23.16.1 off the New Jersey coast and headed for the Pacific. Arriving at Pearl Harbor on 15 May, she sailed for Ulithi on 28 May. In June, she moved on to Leyte; whence, on 1 July, she sailed with TF 38, the Fast Carrier Task Force, for the fleet's final raids on the Japanese home islands. From 10 July until the end of the war, she screened the carriers as their planes flew against military and industrial targets on the Tokyo Plain, in other parts of Honshū, on Hokkaidō, and in the Inland Sea. Twice detached for night shore bombardment missions with TU 34.8.1, she fired on the Hamamatsu area, southern Honshū, on the night of 29 and 30 July, and on Kamaishi, northern Honshū, on 9 and 10 August.

Strikes on the Tokyo Plain scheduled for 15 August were cancelled as hostilities ceased, but the ships continued to cruise off the Japanese coast. On 27 August Southerland anchored in Sagami Wan; and, on 28 August, she moved up to Tokyo, the very first US ship to enter the harbor. On 30 August she covered the landing of occupation troops at Huttu Saki and Yokosuka. A week later, she completed a mail run to the Ryūkyūs; then joined TG 35.1 for further occupation duty. She was the first man of war to enter Tokyo Bay at the time of the signing of the surrender documents

=== Western Pacific, 1946–1949 ===
In January 1946, Southerland sailed for the United States. Immobilized for a time at San Diego, she departed the California coast for the Central Pacific in November; and, in February 1947, she continued on to the western Pacific. She arrived at Shanghai on 8 February and, through the spring, operated along the China coast, primarily out of Qingdao. In June, she was in Japanese waters; and, on 21 June, she sailed for home. From June 1948 to February 1949, she again operated in Chinese and Japanese waters. Southerland had been configured as a radar picket destroyer since World War II and was redesignated DDR-743 on 18 March 1949.

=== Korean War, 1950–1953 ===
Southerland saw service in the Korean War. She was operating in Hawaiian waters at the end of June 1950, when the Korean War broke out. In July, she steamed west to Okinawa; thence proceeded to Japan. On 19 July, she assumed bombardment and patrol duties off the Korean coast.

In September, she joined TF 90 and prepared for the assault landings on the west coast of the embattled peninsula at Inchon. Assigned to Fire Support Group 3, Southerland arrived at Inchon on the morning of 15 September and commenced pre-invasion shelling of targets on Wolmi-do island and in the city of Inchon. After the landings, she provided interdiction, illumination, and support fire. On 16 September she was slightly damaged by counterbattery fire; and, on 17 September, she retired from the area.

For the remainder of the year, the destroyer operated with the carriers of TF 77 and ranged the Korean coast from Pusan to Wonsan and Ch'ongjin. In January 1951, she steamed south. Into February, she operated with the Taiwan Strait patrol; then returned to Japan, whence she sailed for home.

A year later, on 10 February 1952, Southerland was back off Japan. On 14 February, she joined TF 95, the United Nations Blockade and Escort Force, off the west coast of Korea. Carrier escort and coastal patrol duty followed, involving night shore bombardment against enemy transport facilities, boat and troop concentrations, and gun emplacements.

In March, the destroyer conducted ASW exercises off Okinawa; and, in April, as the stalemate in the Panmunjom armistice negotiations continued, she returned to the combat zone. Joining TF 77, she screened carriers, served as plane guard, and participated in shore bombardments - including a combined air/sea strike on Ch'ongjin on Easter Sunday.

On 18 April, Southerland returned to Yokosuka; then steamed to Okinawa for ASW operations. On 11 May, she rejoined TF 77 and, for 28 days, supported the carriers as they struck targets at Ch'ongjin, Wonsan, and other areas. In June, her carrier group shifted to targets inland.

Toward the end of the month, as interservice air strikes hit Communist power sources, Southerland again headed south for Taiwan Strait patrol duty. On 10 July, she rejoined TF 95 off the Korean east coast; and, on the 14th, engaged in a 23-minute duel with seven shore batteries. Taking four direct hits, with eight minor casualties, she made temporary repairs at sea; then continued her patrol. On the 22nd, she put into Sasebo; and, on 10 August, she arrived back in her home port, San Diego.

In mid-April 1953 the ship departed San Diego for her third combat tour off Korea. Until mid-May, and again in June, she patrolled off the Korean coast. On the 27th, she returned to Japan; and, one month later, was assigned to patrol duty along the truce line. On 2 October, she sailed for home.

=== Pacific Fleet, 1954–1962 ===
After Korea, Southerland alternated duty with the 7th Fleet in the western Pacific (WestPac) with training assignments, 1st Fleet operations, and upkeep and overhaul periods. Her Far East deployments included SEATO exercises; Taiwan Strait patrols; 7th Fleet exercises; and, during her 1957 and 1958 WestPac tour, relief work. At the end of December 1958, she joined the aircraft carrier Princeton and the destroyer Henderson in providing emergency relief — food, medicine, and trained medical personnel — for survivors of devastating floods in Ceylon; and she continued that work into January 1958.

In the eastern Pacific, she conducted training exercises, participated in 1st Fleet exercises; and, in 1962, joined Joint Task Force 8 for Operation "Dominic", the upper atmosphere nuclear test series at Christmas Island.

=== FRAM I overhaul, 1963–1964 ===
In November 1963, Southerland, in WestPac and scheduled to participate in amphibious support exercises, was ordered to Vietnam for brief duty as hostilities there threatened American interests. Soon departing, she returned to California for a 10-month FRAM Mark I, overhaul and conversion at Mare Island. During that period, her superstructure above the main deck was removed; berthing and messing areas were renovated; and her engineering spaces were reconditioned. Electronically modernized, her ASW capability was enhanced by the addition of ASROC, an antisubmarine rocket system.

=== Vietnam, 1964–1971 ===
Work was completed in October 1964. Southerland, redesignated DD-743 on 1 April 1964, then tested her new equipment and conducted training exercises until March 1965. She next headed west to return to Vietnam and her third war in the western Pacific.

Departing on 6 March, she joined TF 77 in the South China Sea; and, as in Korea, she screened carriers and acted as plane guard while strikes were flown against Communist targets. After duty with TF 77, she shifted to "Operation Market Time", for trawler surveillance duty. Briefly detached twice in late June, she provided gunfire support in the I Corps area and destroyed several Viet Cong buildings and communications points.

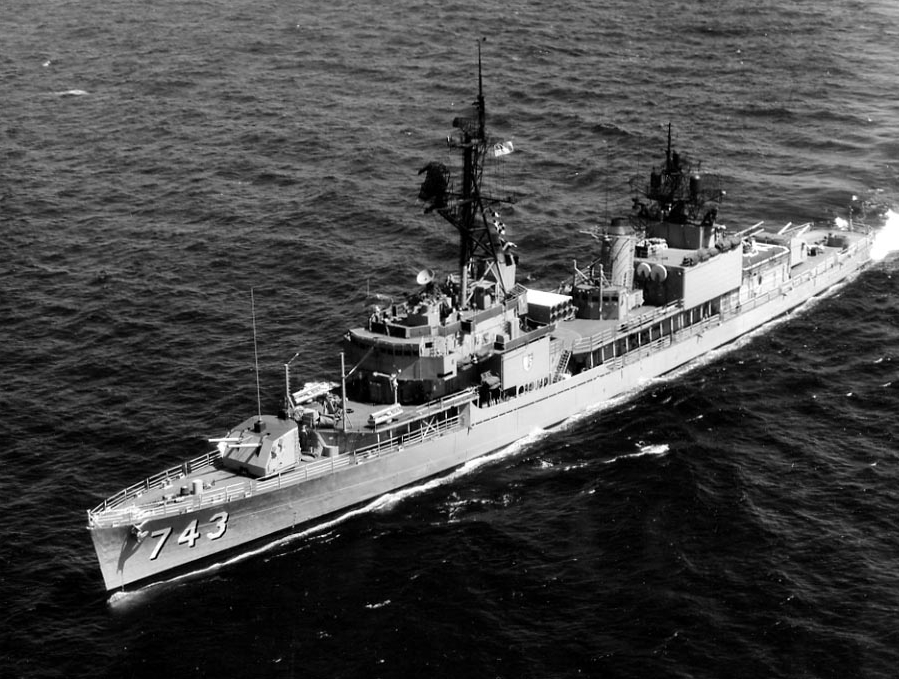
Southerland underway in August 1967.

On 11 September, Southerland arrived back at San Diego. Nine months later, she was underway for another combat tour off Vietnam. On 8 July 1966, she arrived off the embattled coast and, for eleven days, operated with the carrier Intrepid near the Mekong Delta. Detached on 19 July for fire support duty, she returned to the carrier on 28 July; and, at the end of the month, retired to Subic Bay. On 7 August, she was again off Vietnam. Until the end of the month, she operated in Tonkin Gulf with the aircraft carrier Franklin D. Roosevelt. ASW exercises followed; and, in mid-September, she sailed for Japan. At the end of October, she returned to Tonkin Gulf for search and rescue duty.

On 23 November, Southerland completed her Vietnam tour and headed home. In February 1967, she served as ASW School Ship and, in March, as Engineering School Ship. From April to August, she underwent overhaul. In the fall, she conducted refresher training; and, on 28 December, she sailed for WestPac and another tour off Vietnam.

From then until 28 June 1968 and again from 18 March to 3 July 1969, Southerland operated with the 7th Fleet on assignments similar to those in 1965 and 1966. In 1969, she was assigned as one of the escorts of the USS Kitty Hawk (CV-63). In 1970, she sailed west in mid-June; operated in Japanese waters through the end of July; then steamed south, for Vietnam, on 6 August. There, she again alternated carrier escort and plane guard duties in Tonkin Gulf with fire support activities off the southern coast of the divided country until mid-November. On 1 December, she returned to San Diego.

During the first half of 1971, Southerland spent two periods underway, one in January and one in April. Both were in conjunction with Composite Unit Training Exercises conducted in the southern California (SOCAL) operating area. On 29 June, she got underway from San Diego en route to the western Pacific. She remained in the Far East until 5 December, plane guarding for the carrier Enterprise and visiting such oriental ports as Hong Kong, Singapore, and Subic Bay. After a 17-day passage, Southerland returned to San Diego on 22 December.

=== Training ship, 1972–1980 ===
On 2 June 1972, the ship entered the Long Beach Naval Shipyard and commenced an overhaul which lasted until 9 November. During the yard work, her main propulsion plant was converted to use navy distillate fuel.

The destroyer continued her operations out of San Diego along the southern California coast until mid-June 1973. On the 11th, she stood out of San Diego and headed north to Seattle, Washington. There, she embarked naval reservists and shaped a course for the western Pacific, via Adak, Alaska. For the rest of the summer, she participated in Operation "Charger SurfPac 1-73", during which successive complements of reservists received training in 7th Fleet operations and the opportunity to train with elements of friendly foreign navies. The capability of the Naval Reserve to augment the fleet on short notice was demonstrated by the airlift which brought in new groups of reservists at regular intervals once the deployment had begun. Southerland reentered San Diego on 30 August 1973, successfully concluding Operation "Charger SurfPac 1-73." From September through December, she cruised along the west coast, out of San Diego, with naval reservists embarked for training. Through September 1974, Southerland has continued to operate along the west coast out of San Diego, clearing that area only once in late February and early March to visit Pearl Harbor, Hawaii. En route to Hawaii she was accompanied by the British frigate HMS Jupiter, and conducted joint exercises including an exchange of crew members by highline transfer and return by helicopter.

During her final six months in late 1980 and leading up to the decommissioning, the ship continued her role as a training ship for reservists serving their annual mandatory two weeks of active service. By the summer of 1980 the permanent full-time crew had been reduced to approximately two-thirds of the normal full complement. Training reservists filled out the remaining crew. In August 1980 Southerland made her last foreign port-of-call to Acapulco, Mexico. After a brief stop in Mazatlan for fuel, Southerland continued on to Acapulco and spent three full days at anchor near the mouth of the harbor before returning to port in San Diego. During the fall of 1980 she participated in several naval gunnery and training exercises off of southern San Clemente Island.

=== Decommissioning in 1981, fate ===
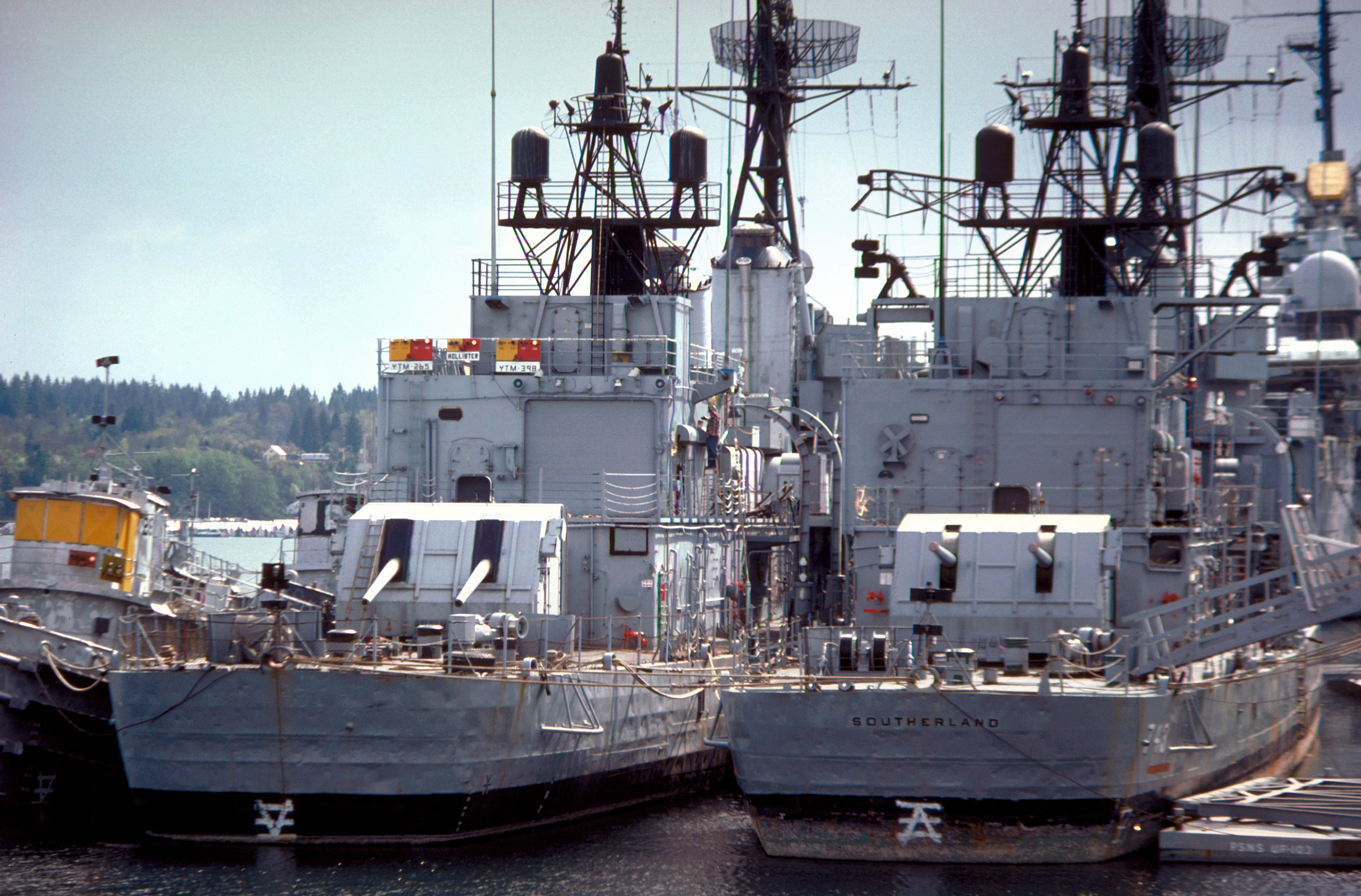
Decommissioned destroyers Southerland and Hollister at Puget Sound, 1981.

Southerland was decommissioned at 10:00 am PST on Thursday, 26 February 1981. The ship was struck from the Naval Vessel Register on 26 February 1981.

A planned transfer of Southerland to the Ecuadoran Navy fell through due to a fishing rights dispute. Subsequently, the ship was disposed of as a missile testing target and sunk at 13:49:30 PST on 2 August 1997 in the Pacific Ocean off the coast of California at 34°57′N 122°08′W.

== Awards ==
Southerland earned one battle star during World War II; eight during the Korean War; and 10 during her Vietnam War tours.
