= James H. Dayton =

United States Navy career officer (1846–1938)

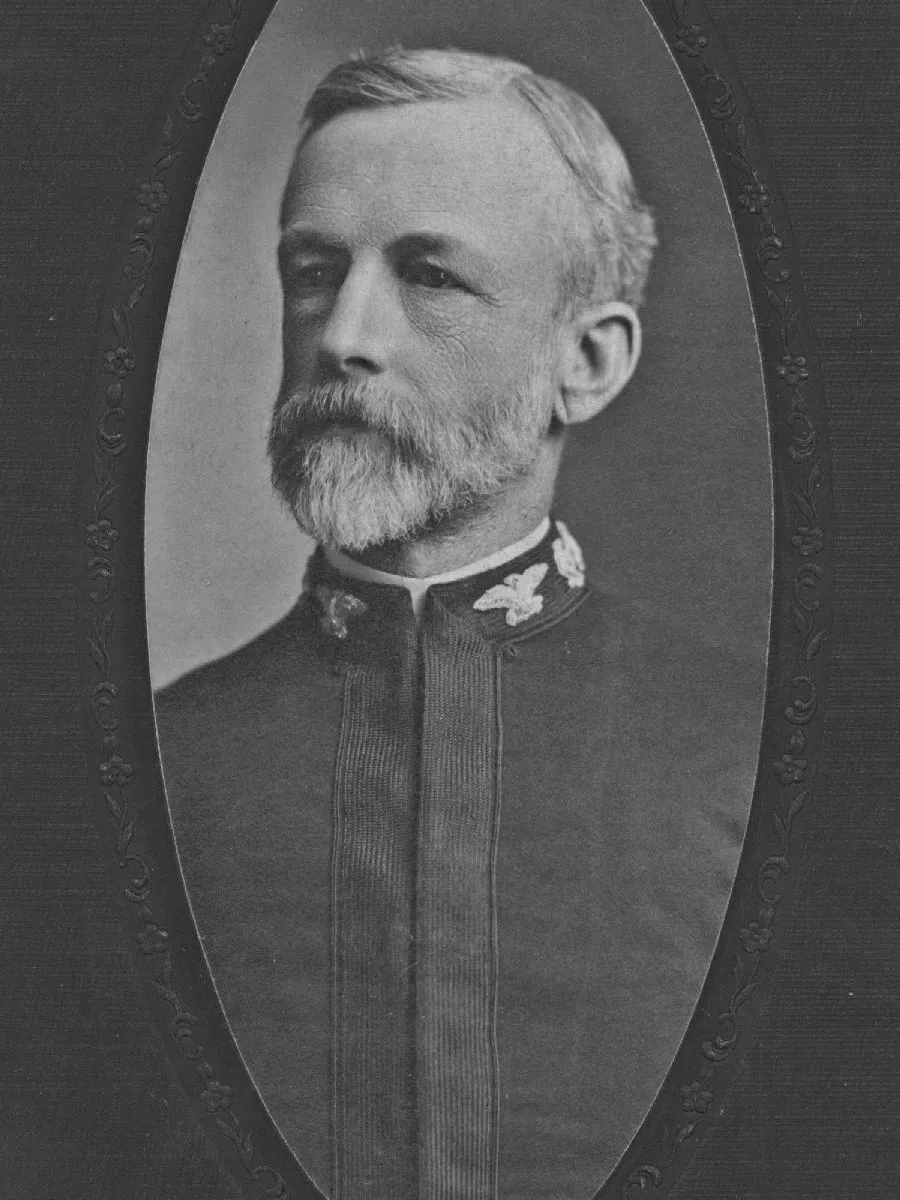
- Born: October 5, 1846; South Bend, Indiana, U.S.
- Died: November 15, 1938; South Bend, Indiana, U.S.
- Burial place: South Bend City Cemetery
- Relatives: Dr. Daniel Dayton (Father); Anna Dayton (Mother)
- Military career
- Allegiance: United States
- Branch: United States Navy
- Service years: 1862–1909
- Rank: Rear admiral
- Commands: USS Chicago; Philippine Squadron, United States Asiatic Fleet; United States Pacific Fleet
- Conflicts: Civil War; Spanish–American War

Navy Career
Midshipman – 1867
- 1867–69: USS Pensacola (1859)

Ensign – 1869
- 1869: USS Cyane (1837)

Master – 1870
- 1870: USS Miantonomoh (1863)

Lieutenant – 1871
- 1871-73: USS Plymouth
- 1874: USS Worcester (1866)
- 1878-81: USS Quinnebaug (1875)
- 1882-83: Navy Yard

Lieutenant Commander – 1884
- 1884: USS Dolphin (PG-24)
- 1884-87: USS Mohican (1883)
- 1892-93: USS Vermont (1848)
- 1893-94: USS Petrel (PG-2)

Commander – 1894
- 1897-98: USS Detroit (C-10)

Captain – 1900
- 1901: Bureau of Navigation
- 1901: USS Chicago (1885)
- 1904: Board of Inspection and Survey (President)

Rear Admiral – 1906
- 1906–07: Philippine Squadron
- 1907–08: United States Pacific Fleet

James Henry Dayton (October 5, 1846 – November 15, 1938) was a rear admiral of the United States Navy and Commander-in-Chief of the United States Pacific Fleet.

== Biography ==
Dayton was born in South Bend, Indiana, and entered the Navy in 1862 as a cadet midshipman at the United States Naval Academy.

He graduated from the Academy in 1866 as a Passed Midshipman. He was promoted to ensign in 1868, master and then lieutenant in 1870, lieutenant commander in March 1884, and captain in 1900.

On promotion to rear admiral on February 27, 1906, he was named Commander-in-Chief of the Asiatic Squadron where he served until the formation of the Pacific Fleet in 1907 when he was named Commander-in-Chief of the fleet, which he held until his retirement in 1908.

After his retirement, he was asked to head the Court-Martial board during World War 1.

== Personal life ==
James Henry Dayton was born in South Bend, Indiana, and was the son of Dr. Daniel and Anna Dayton. His father, a graduate of Geneva Medical College in New York, settled in the area in 1836 and became South Bend's first formally trained physician. He established his practice at the southwest corner of Michigan Street and LaSalle Avenue, close to the family home at 311 North Michigan Street, where James and his sister lived during their childhood.

Military offices
Preceded by	Commander in Chief of the United States Pacific Fleet	Succeeded by William T. Swinburne
