= William Henry Hudson Southerland =

American military officer (1852–1933)

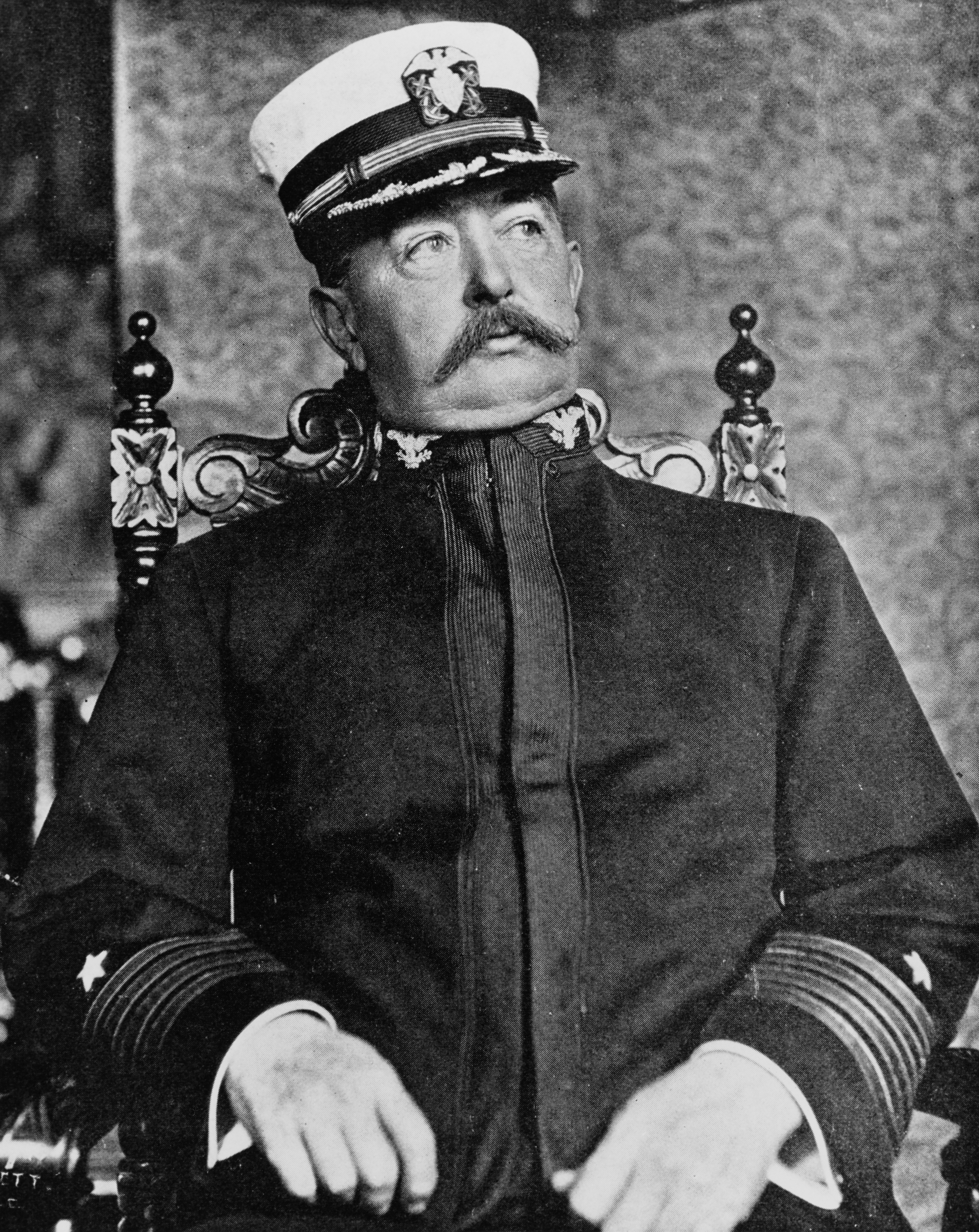
- Southerland, c. 1907
- Born: July 10, 1852; New York City, US
- Died: January 30, 1933 (aged 80); Washington, D.C., US
- Relatives: J. Butler Wright (son-in-law)
- Military career
- Allegiance: United States
- Branch: United States Navy
- Service years: 1865; 1867–1914
- Rank: Rear Admiral
- Commands: Eagle; Yankee; Cleveland (C-19); New Jersey (BB-16); Pacific Fleet
- Conflicts: American Civil War; Spanish–American War; Occupation of Nicaragua

William Henry Hudson Southerland (July 10, 1852 – January 30, 1933) was a rear admiral in the United States Navy. He commanded several ships in Cuban waters during the Spanish–American War, and later served as Commander in Chief of the Pacific Fleet.

== Biography ==
Southerland was born on July 10, 1852, in New York City, to William and Phoebe E. Southerland. Southerland first joined the Union Navy as a volunteer towards the end of the Civil War, despite being only twelve years old, serving for only a brief time. He re-enlisted in early 1867 as a naval apprentice, finally entered the United States Naval Academy in June 1868, shortly before his sixteenth birthday.

After graduating second in his class from the Academy on June 1, 1872, he served aboard the sloop Tuscarora. After a year at sea, he was commissioned as an ensign. From 1875 to 1876, he returned to the Academy as a staff member.

Over the next 34 years, Southerland served in varied positions at sea and ashore, including duty with the Hydrographic Office, the Bureau of Equipment, and the Board of Inspection and Survey. During the Spanish–American War, he commanded the gunboat Eagle in the blockade of Cuban ports; and, in 1905, he returned to the Caribbean to command Yankee and to act as Senior Officer, Naval Forces in Santo Domingo. In between, he supervised the fitting out of the protected cruiser Cleveland (C-19) before briefly serving as her first commander in November 1903. Promoted to captain in 1906, he commanded the battleship New Jersey (BB-16) of the Great White Fleet in 1907–09. He graduated from the Naval War College in 1909.

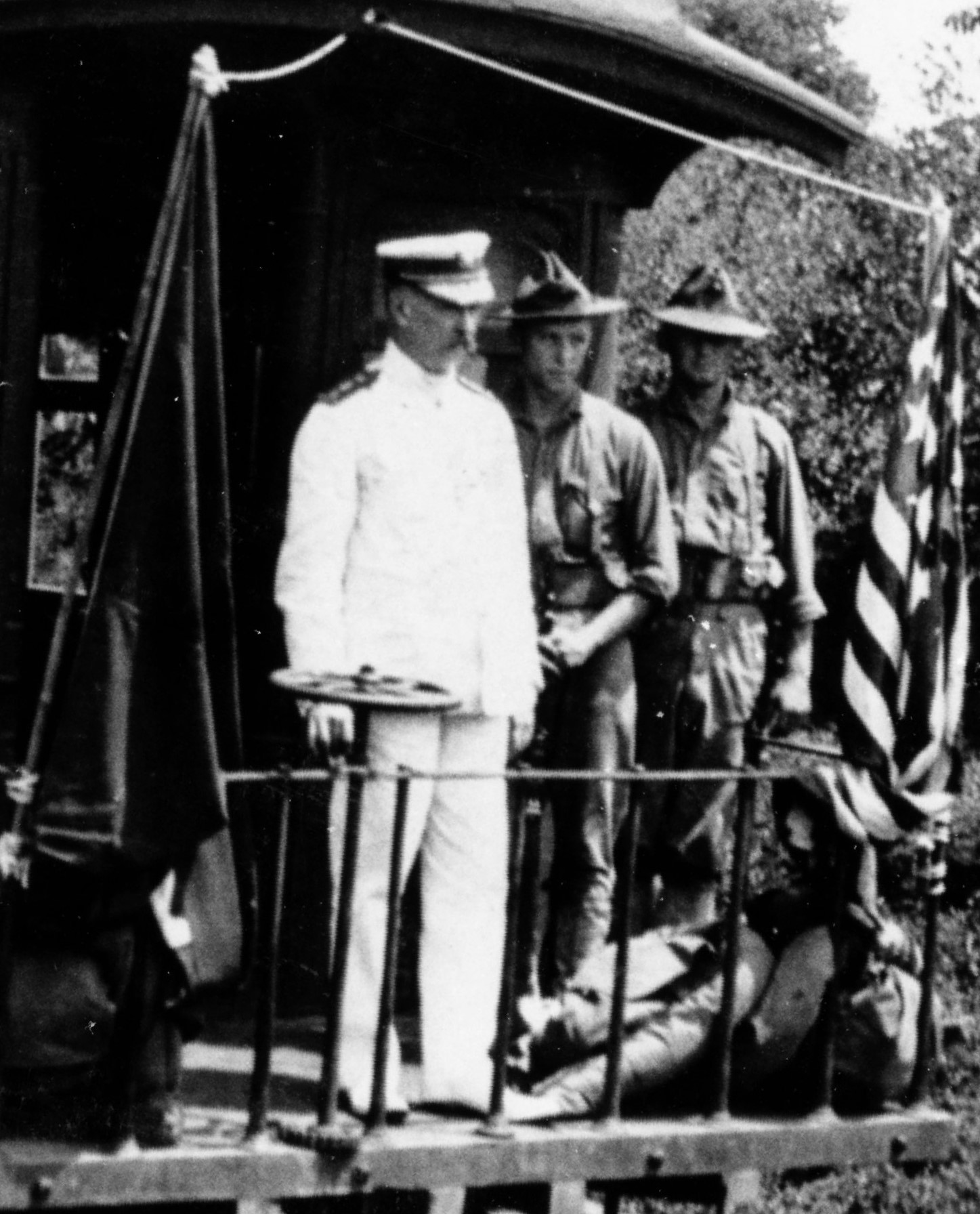
Traveling by train to Managua in 1912

Appointed rear admiral on May 4, 1910, he served as President of the Board of Inspection and Survey for Shore Stations until becoming Commander, 2nd Division, Pacific Fleet in March 1911, and commanded naval forces in the Nicaragua Expedition. In 1912, he became Commander in Chief, Pacific Fleet; and, in March 1913, he left the fleet to take up duties on the General Board.

On his retirement on July 10, 1914, at age 62, Southerland was the last Civil War naval veteran still in active service, and one of very few to rise from enlisted man to admiral in the course of his career.

Admiral Southerland died in Washington, D.C., on January 30, 1933. He was interred at Arlington National Cemetery on February 2, 1933, aged 80.

The destroyer USS Southerland (DD-743) (1944–1981) was named in his honor.

== Family ==
On August 1, 1877, Southerland married Mary Rodman (1859–1935). She was the first cousin of Navy officer Hugh Rodman. The couple had two daughters, one of whom married diplomat J. Butler Wright. After his retirement, Southerland and his wife lived in Washington, D.C.

Military offices
Preceded by Chauncey Thomas, Jr.	Commander-in-Chief of the U.S. Pacific Fleet; 1912–March 1913	Succeeded by Walter C. Cowles
