= William T. Swinburne =

American officer (1847–1928)

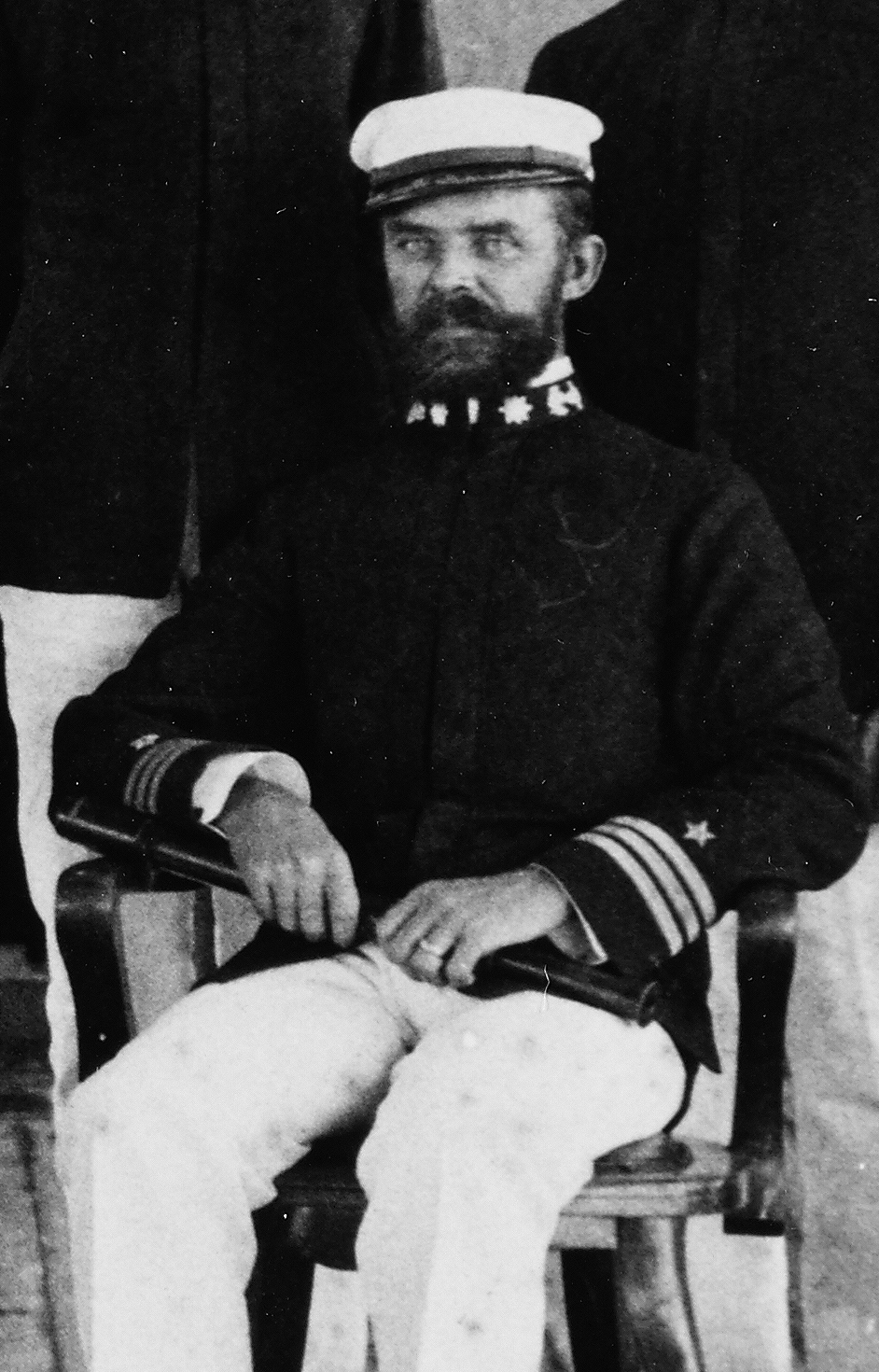
- Born: August 24, 1847; Newport, Rhode Island, U.S.
- Died: March 3, 1928 (aged 80); Coronado, California, U.S.
- Military career
- Allegiance: United States
- Branch: United States Navy
- Service years: 1862–1909
- Rank: Rear admiral
- Commands: Pacific Squadron
- Conflicts: American Civil War; Spanish–American War

William T. Swinburne (August 24, 1847 – March 3, 1928) was a rear admiral of the United States Navy and one-time Commander-in-Chief of the United States Pacific Fleet.

== Biography ==
He was born in Newport, Rhode Island, and entered the Navy on September 29, 1862, as a cadet midshipman at the United States Naval Academy.

He graduated from the Academy in 1866 as a Passed Midshipman. He was promoted to ensign in April 1868, master on March 26, 1869, lieutenant on March 21, 1880, and lieutenant commander in March 1887.

He was Commander-in-Chief of the Pacific Squadron from 1906 to the formation of the Pacific Fleet in 1907 where he commanded the newly formed Second Squadron. He served as Commander-in-Chief of the Pacific Fleet from 1908 until May 17, 1909 pending his retirement.

He was a member of the California Commandery of the Military Order of the Loyal Legion of the United States and was assigned insignia number 15949. He was also a member of the Military Order of Foreign Wars and was assigned insignia number 411.

== Personal life ==
Swinburne's first wife was Catherine Elsie (nee Vincent) Swinburne (1851–1904). They had one daughter, Dorothea Vincent McNamee. Swinburne's second wife was Sophie (nee Cook) Swinburne (1859–1939).

On March 3, 1928, Swinburne died in Coronado, California. Swinburne was buried at sea in accordance with his will. His body was carried by the scout cruiser USS Omaha and consigned to the sea about 20 miles off Point Loma, San Diego on March 5, 1928.

== Gallery ==
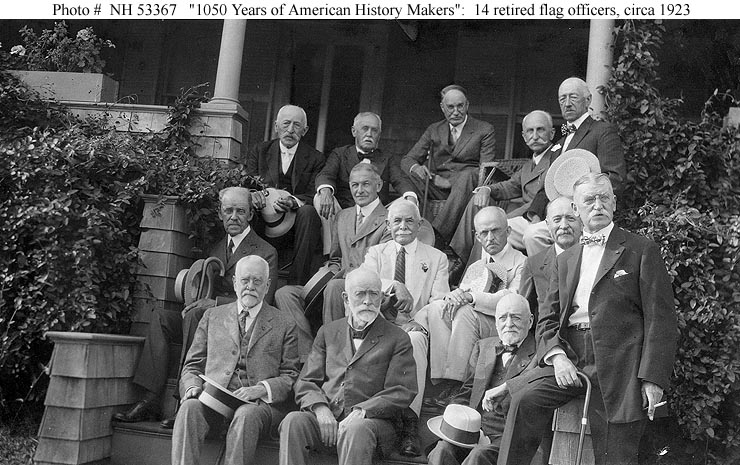
William T. Swinburne is on the left in the middle row in this photograph of 13 retired United States Navy rear admirals and one retired United States Marine Corps major general taken ca. 1923.

== See also ==
- Luke McNamee, Admiral who married his daughter

Military offices
Preceded by James H. Dayton	Commander in Chief of the United States Pacific Fleet; 17 May 1908-17 May 1909	Succeeded by Uriel Sebree
