= Commander, U.S. Pacific Fleet =

Flag officer appointment of the United States Navy

- Commander's seal

- Flag of a U.S. Navy four-star admiral

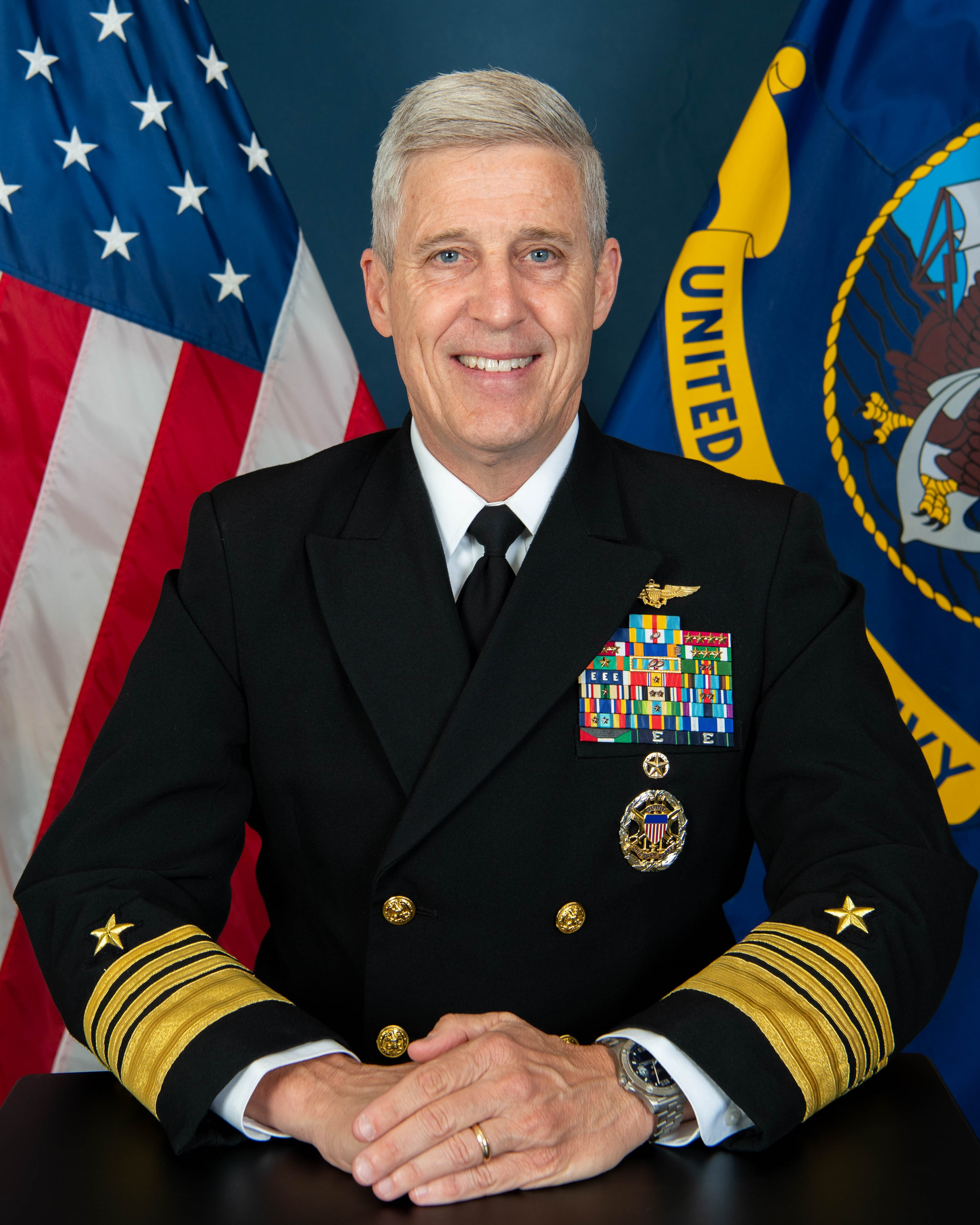
- Incumbent; Admiral Stephen Koehler since April 4, 2024
- United States Pacific Fleet
- Abbreviation: COMPACFLT
- Reports to: Secretary of the Navy (administrative); Chief of Naval Operations (administrative); Commander, U.S. Indo-Pacific Command (operational)
- Seat: Naval Station Pearl Harbor, Hawaii
- Appointer: The president; with Senate advice and consent
- Term length: 2–3 years; (approx.)
- Formation: July 22, 1907
- First holder: RADM James H. Dayton
- Deputy: Deputy Commander, U.S. Pacific Fleet
- Website: Official website

Commander, U.S. Pacific Fleet (COMPACFLT) is the title of the United States Navy officer who commands the United States Pacific Fleet (USPACFLT). Originally established in 1907 as a two-star rear admiral's billet, the position has been held by a four-star admiral since March 19, 1915.

As of April 4, 2024, Admiral Stephen Koehler is the 65th and current commander, U.S. Pacific Fleet.

== History ==
The position has been known by several titles since its inception.

- 1907 to December 6, 1922: Commander-in-Chief, U.S. Pacific Fleet (CINCPACFLT)
- December 6, 1922 to April 1, 1931: Commander-in-Chief, Battle Fleet (CINCBATFLT)
- April 1, 1931 to February 1, 1941: Commander, Battle Force, United States Fleet (COMBATFOR)
- February 1, 1941 to October 24, 2002: Commander-in-Chief, U.S. Pacific Fleet (CINCPACFLT)
- October 24, 2002 to present: Commander, U.S. Pacific Fleet (COMPACFLT)

== List of commanders ==
No.	Commander		Term		
No.	Portrait	Name	Took office	Left office	Term length
Commander-in-Chief, U.S. Pacific Fleet (CINCPACFLT)
1	James H. Dayton	Rear Admiral; James H. Dayton (1846–1938)	July 22, 1907	Oct 25, 1908	1 year, 95 days
2	William T. Swinburne	Rear Admiral; William T. Swinburne (1847–1928)	Oct 25, 1908	May 17, 1909	204 days
3	Uriel Sebree	Rear Admiral; Uriel Sebree (1848–1922)	May 17, 1909	February 19, 1910	278 days
4	Giles B. Harber	Rear Admiral; Giles B. Harber (1849–1925)	February 19, 1910	November 1, 1910	255 days
-	Edward B. Barry	Rear Admiral; Edward B. Barry (1849–1938)	November 1, 1910	January 15, 1911	75 days
-	Chauncey Thomas Jr.	Rear Admiral; Chauncey Thomas Jr. (1850–1919)	January 15, 1911	1912	~351 days
5	William H. H. Southerland	Rear Admiral; William H. H. Southerland (1852–1933)	1912	March 1913	~1 year, 59 days
5	Walter C. Cowles	Rear Admiral; Walter C. Cowles (1853–1917)	March 1913	January 1914	~306 days
6	Thomas B. Howard	Admiral; Thomas B. Howard (1854–1920)	January 1914	September 13, 1915	~1 year, 255 days
7	Cameron M. Winslow	Admiral; Cameron M. Winslow (1854–1932)	September 13, 1915	July 29, 1916	320 days
8	William B. Caperton	Admiral; William B. Caperton (1855–1941)	July 29, 1916	April 30, 1919	2 years, 275 days
9	Hugh Rodman	Admiral; Hugh Rodman (1859–1940)	July 1, 1919	July 5, 1921	2 years, 4 days
10	Edward W. Eberle	Admiral; Edward W. Eberle (1864–1929)	July 5, 1921	December 6, 1922	1 year, 154 days
Commander-in-Chief, Battle Fleet (CINCBATFLT)
10	Edward W. Eberle	Admiral; Edward W. Eberle (1864–1929) (Note: Term shortened due to appointment as Chief of Naval Operations.)	December 6, 1922	June 30, 1923	206 days
11	Samuel S. Robison	Admiral; Samuel S. Robison (1867–1952)	June 30, 1923	October 14, 1925	2 years, 106 days
12	Charles F. Hughes	Admiral; Charles F. Hughes (1866–1934)	October 14, 1925	September 4, 1926	325 days
13	Richard H. Jackson	Admiral; Richard H. Jackson (1866–1971)	September 4, 1926	September 10, 1927	1 year, 6 days
14	Louis R. de Steiguer	Admiral; Louis R. de Steiguer (1867–1947)	September 10, 1927	May 21, 1929	290 days
15	William V. Pratt	Admiral; William V. Pratt (1869–1957)	June 26, 1928	May 21, 1929	329 days
16	Louis M. Nulton	Admiral; Louis M. Nulton (1869–1954)	May 21, 1929	May 24, 1930	1 year, 3 days
17	Frank H. Schofield	Admiral; Frank H. Schofield (1869–1942)	May 24, 1930	April 1, 1931	312 days
Commander, Battle Force, United States Fleet (COMBATFOR)
17	Frank H. Schofield	Admiral; Frank H. Schofield (1869–1942)	April 1, 1931	September 15, 1931	167 days
18	Richard H. Leigh	Admiral; Richard H. Leigh (1870–1946)	September 15, 1931	August 11, 1932	331 days
19	Luke McNamee	Admiral; Luke McNamee (1871–1952)	August 11, 1932	May 20, 1933	282 days
20	William H. Standley	Admiral; William H. Standley (1872–1963)	May 20, 1933	July 1, 1933	42 days
21	Joseph M. Reeves	Admiral; Joseph M. Reeves (1872–1948)	July 1, 1933	April 1, 1935	349 days
22	Frank H. Brumby	Admiral; Frank H. Brumby (1874–1950)	June 15, 1934	April 1, 1935	290 days
23	Harris Laning	Admiral; Harris Laning (1873–1941)	April 1, 1935	March 30, 1936	364 days
24	William D. Leahy	Admiral; William D. Leahy (1875–1959)	March 30, 1936	December 31, 1936	276 days
25	Claude C. Bloch	Admiral; Claude C. Bloch (1878–1967)	December 31, 1936	January 29, 1938	1 year, 29 days
26	Edward C. Kalbfus	Admiral; Edward C. Kalbfus (1877–1954)	January 29, 1938	June 24, 1939	1 year, 146 days
27	James O. Richardson	Admiral; James O. Richardson (1878–1974)	June 24, 1939	February 1, 1941	1 year, 222 days
Commander-in-Chief, U.S. Pacific Fleet (CINCPACFLT)
28	Husband E. Kimmel	Admiral; Husband E. Kimmel (1882–1968) (Note: Relieved of command after the Japanese attack on Pearl Harbor on December 7, 1941.)	February 1, 1941	December 17, 1941	319 days
-	William S. Pye	Vice Admiral; William S. Pye (1880–1959); Acting	December 17, 1941	December 31, 1941	14 days
29	Chester W. Nimitz	Fleet Admiral; Chester W. Nimitz (1885–1966) (Note: Nimitz was appointed CINCPAC in grade of admiral; he was promoted to fleet admiral on December 19, 1944.)	December 31, 1941	November 24, 1945	3 years, 328 days
30	Raymond A. Spruance	Admiral; Raymond A. Spruance (1886–1969)	November 24, 1945	February 1, 1946	69 days
31	John H. Towers	Admiral; John H. Towers (1885–1955)	February 1, 1946	February 28, 1947	1 year, 27 days
32	Louis E. Denfeld	Admiral; Louis E. Denfeld (1891–1972)	February 28, 1947	December 3, 1947	278 days
33	DeWitt C. Ramsey	Admiral; DeWitt C. Ramsey (1888–1961)	December 3, 1947	April 30, 1949	1 year, 148 days
34	Arthur W. Radford	Admiral; Arthur W. Radford (1896–1973)	April 30, 1949	July 10, 1953	4 years, 71 days
35	Felix B. Stump	Admiral; Felix B. Stump (1894–1972)	July 10, 1953	January 14, 1958	4 years, 188 days
36	Maurice E. Curts	Admiral; Maurice E. Curts (1898–1976)	January 14, 1958	February 1, 1958	18 days
37	Herbert G. Hopwood	Admiral; Herbert G. Hopwood (1898–1966)	February 1, 1958	August 30, 1960	2 years, 211 days
38	John H. Sides	Admiral; John H. Sides (1904–1978)	August 30, 1960	September 30, 1963	3 years, 31 days
39	U.S. Grant Sharp Jr.	Admiral; U.S. Grant Sharp Jr. (1906–2001) (Note: Term shortened due to appointment as Commander-in-Chief, U.S. Pacific Command.)	September 30, 1963	June 26, 1964	270 days
40	Thomas H. Moorer	Admiral; Thomas H. Moorer (1912–2004) (Note: Term shortened due to appointment as Commander-in-Chief, Atlantic Command and U.S. Atlantic Fleet.)	June 26, 1964	March 30, 1965	277 days
41	Roy L. Johnson	Admiral; Roy L. Johnson (1906–1999)	March 30, 1965	November 30, 1967	2 years, 245 days
42	John J. Hyland Jr.	Admiral; John J. Hyland Jr. (1912–1998)	November 30, 1967	December 5, 1970	3 years, 5 days
43	Bernard A. Clarey	Admiral; Bernard A. Clarey (1912–1996)	December 5, 1970	September 30, 1973	2 years, 299 days
44	Maurice F. Weisner	Admiral; Maurice F. Weisner (1917–2006)	September 30, 1973	August 12, 1976	2 years, 317 days
45	Thomas B. Hayward	Admiral; Thomas B. Hayward (1924–2022)	August 12, 1976	May 9, 1978	1 year, 270 days
46	Donald C. Davis	Admiral; Donald C. Davis (1921–1998)	May 9, 1978	July 31, 1981	3 years, 83 days
47	James D. Watkins	Admiral; James D. Watkins (1927–2012)	July 31, 1981	May 28, 1982	301 days
48	Sylvester R. Foley Jr.	Admiral; Sylvester R. Foley Jr. (1928–2019)	May 28, 1982	September 16, 1985	3 years, 111 days
49	James A. Lyons Jr.	Admiral; James A. Lyons Jr. (1927–2018)	September 16, 1985	September 30, 1987	2 years, 14 days
50	David E. Jeremiah	Admiral; David E. Jeremiah (1934–2013)	September 30, 1987	February 15, 1990	2 years, 138 days
51	Charles R. Larson	Admiral; Charles R. Larson (1936–2014)	February 15, 1990	February 15, 1991	1 year, 0 days
52	Robert J. Kelly	Admiral; Robert J. Kelly (born 1938)	February 15, 1991	August 6, 1994	3 years, 172 days
53	Ronald J. Zlatoper	Admiral; Ronald J. Zlatoper (1942–2022)	August 6, 1994	November 7, 1996	2 years, 93 days
54	Archie Clemins	Admiral; Archie Clemins (1943–2020)	November 7, 1996	October 8, 1999	2 years, 335 days
55	Thomas B. Fargo	Admiral; Thomas B. Fargo (born 1948)	October 8, 1999	May 4, 2002	2 years, 208 days
56	Walter F. Doran	Admiral; Walter F. Doran (born 1945)	May 4, 2002	October 24, 2002	173 days
Commander, U.S. Pacific Fleet (COMPACFLT)
56	Walter F. Doran	Admiral; Walter F. Doran (born 1945)	October 24, 2002	July 8, 2005	2 years, 257 days
57	Gary Roughead	Admiral; Gary Roughead (born 1951)	July 8, 2005	May 8, 2007	1 year, 304 days
58	Robert F. Willard	Admiral; Robert F. Willard (born 1950)	May 8, 2007	September 25, 2009	2 years, 140 days
59	Patrick M. Walsh	Admiral; Patrick M. Walsh (born 1955)	September 25, 2009	January 20, 2012	2 years, 117 days
60	Cecil D. Haney	Admiral; Cecil D. Haney (born 1955)	January 20, 2012	October 16, 2013	1 year, 269 days
61	Harry B. Harris Jr.	Admiral; Harry B. Harris Jr. (born 1956)	October 16, 2013	May 27, 2015	1 year, 223 days
62	Scott H. Swift	Admiral; Scott H. Swift (born 1957)	May 27, 2015	May 17, 2018	2 years, 355 days
63	John C. Aquilino	Admiral; John C. Aquilino (born 1962)	May 17, 2018	April 30, 2021	2 years, 348 days
-	Stephen T. Koehler	Rear Admiral; Stephen T. Koehler (born 1964); Acting	April 30, 2021	May 5, 2021	5 days
64	Samuel J. Paparo Jr.	Admiral; Samuel J. Paparo Jr. (born 1964)	May 5, 2021	April 4, 2024	2 years, 335 days
65	Stephen T. Koehler	Admiral; Stephen T. Koehler (born 1964)	April 4, 2024	Incumbent	2 years, 203 days

== In popular culture ==
In the movie Top Gun: Maverick, Val Kilmer plays Adm. Tom "Iceman" Kazansky, Commander of the U.S. Pacific Fleet.

== See also ==
- Commander, U.S. Fleet Forces Command
