= USS Washtenaw County =

United States Navy minesweeper (1953–1973)

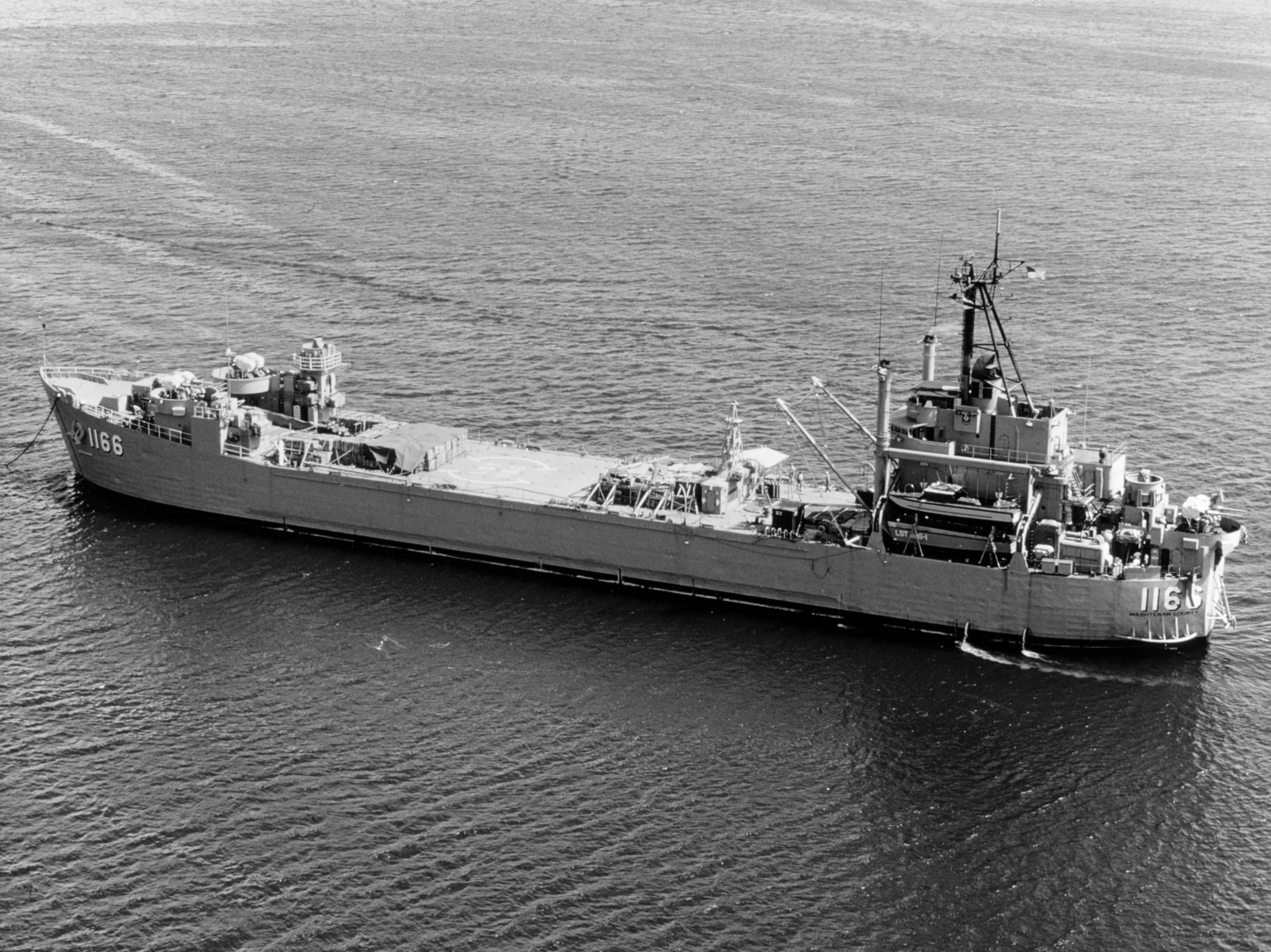
- Washtenaw County (MSS-2) underway in Haiphong harbor, North Vietnam in June 1973. By running the channel to Haiphong, Washtenaw County verified that all U.S. mines had been cleared.

History

United States
- Name: USS Washtenaw County
- Namesake: Washtenaw County, Michigan
- Builder: Christy Shipbuilding Corporation, Sturgeon Bay, Wisconsin
- Laid down: 29 November 1951
- Launched: 22 November 1952
- Commissioned: 29 October 1953, as USS LST-1166
- Decommissioned: August 1973
- Renamed: USS Washtenaw County, 1 July 1955
- Reclassified: MSS-2 (Special Device Minesweeper), 9 February 1973
- Stricken: 30 August 1973
- Identification: IMO number: 7743405
- Honours and awards: Vietnam; 17 battle stars; 2 Presidential Unit Citations; 2 Navy Unit Commendations; 4 Meritorious Unit Commendations
- Fate: Undergoing restoration to museum ship (presently on hold)
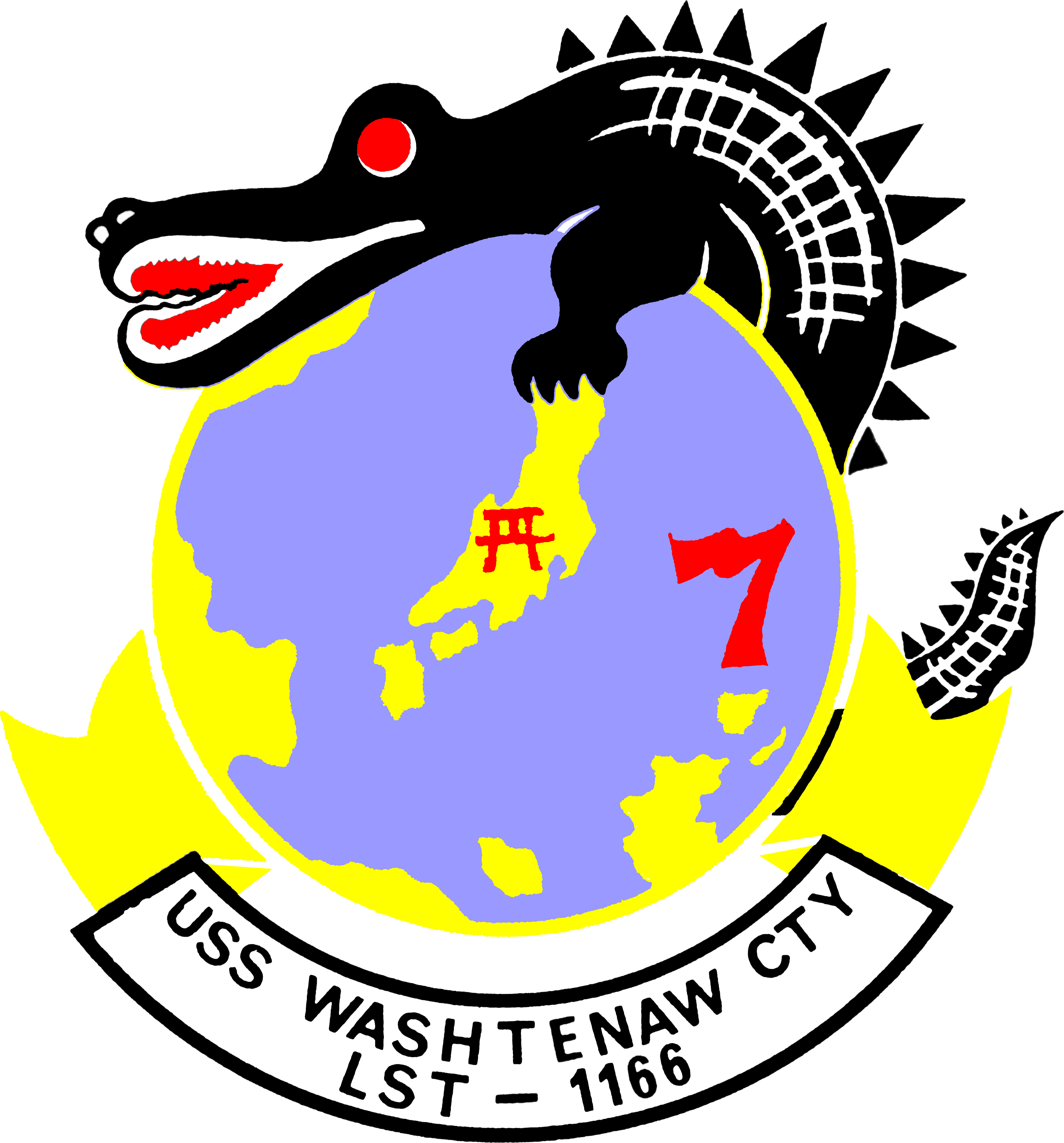
- Badge

General characteristics
- Class & type: Terrebonne Parish-class tank landing ship
- Displacement: 2,590 long tons (2,632 t) light; 5,800 long tons (5,893 t) full load
- Length: 384 ft (117 m)
- Beam: 55 ft (17 m)
- Draft: 17 ft (5.2 m)
- Propulsion: 4 × General Motors 16-278A diesel engines, 2 controllable pitch propellers
- Speed: 14 knots (26 km/h; 16 mph)
- Boats & landing craft carried: 3 × LCVPs; 1 × LCPL
- Troops: 15 officers and 380 enlisted men
- Complement: 16 officers and 189 enlisted men
- Armament: 3 × twin 3"/50 caliber guns; 5 × single 20 mm guns
- Aviation facilities: Helicopter landing deck

USS Washtenaw County (LST-1166) was a Terrebonne Parish-class tank landing ship in commission in the United States Navy from 1953 to 1973. Named for Washtenaw County, Michigan, she was the only U.S. Navy vessel to bear the name. She is currently derelict. In October 2008, she was reported to be at the southeastern tip of Lord Island on the Columbia River in Rainier, Oregon at 46°07′18″ N 123°00′51″ W next to the Oregon shoreline. She is listed as a derelict vessel by the interagency Derelict Vessel Task Force, and has suffered damage from vandalism and looting between 2005 and 2008. While some had hoped to restore the ship as a museum ship, there is no funding or plan to do so.

== Service history (source: Dictionary of American Naval Fighting Ships) ==
=== Construction and commissioning ===
Designed under project SCB 9A and laid down as LST-1166 on 29 November 1951 at Sturgeon Bay, Wisconsin by the Christy Shipbuilding Corporation. The ship was launched on 22 November 1952, sponsored by Miss Dorothy Christenson; and commissioned at the New Orleans Naval Station on 29 October 1953.

==== 1953–1955 ====
The tank landing ship departed New Orleans on 28 November 1953 to join Landing Ship Flotilla 2, Atlantic Fleet, based at Little Creek, Virginia. There, she first joined the Amphibious Operational Training Element for seven weeks of shakedown training, following which she participated in amphibious operations at Vieques Island near Puerto Rico as a unit of LST Squadron 4. Routine operations out of the amphibious base at Little Creek occupied her time through the summer of 1954 and into the fall. In October, she began an extended repair period at the Philadelphia Naval Shipyard to correct vibration problems. She returned to active operations in March 1955. On 1 July 1955 she was named USS Washtenaw County (LST-1166). Between July and November, she operated out of Little Creek and then began preparations for her first overseas deployment.

==== 1956–1957 ====
On 9 January 1956 Washtenaw County stood out of Norfolk for a cruise with the 6th Fleet in the Mediterranean. That deployment proved to be a quiet one, and the most notable events in which she participated were exercises and visits to a long itinerary of ports along the Mediterranean littoral. At the conclusion of that assignment, she headed back to Norfolk, where she arrived on 4 June. Following repairs at the Norfolk Naval Shipyard, she resumed operations with the Atlantic Amphibious Force out of Little Creek. That November, the amphibious exercise in which she was scheduled to participate were cancelled because of the Suez Crisis. Washtenaw County remained in port through the end of the year on alert status ready to leave port on 24 hours notice. By January 1957, however, the crisis subsided, and the ship moved north to Staten Island, New York for an overhaul, followed by a month of refresher training in April. In June and July, she joined in a series of exercises in preparation for the NATO exercises which followed that fall.

==== 1958 ====
On 6 January 1958 the ship departed Little Creek in conjunction with her transfer to the Pacific Fleet Amphibious Force as a unit of PhibRon 1. She transited the Panama Canal on the 15th and headed north in company with sister ships Vernon County (LST-1161), Washoe County (LST-1165), Westchester County (LST-1167), and Windham County (LST-1170).

The landing ships reached San Diego on 27 January and began a period of upkeep and local operations. In May, Washtenaw County participated in two amphibious exercises with marines from Camp Pendleton and, in June, joined the Thomaston (LSD-28) for another one. In July and August, the crises which broke out in Lebanon and Taiwan, respectively, caused Washtenaw County to be alerted once again. In August, she embarked upon an emergency deployment to the Far East. The tank landing ship made it only as far as Pearl Harbor before the trouble in the Orient abated sufficiently to allow her to head back to the west coast. There, she resumed her schedule of normal operations and exercises with PhibRon 1 until 3 October when she entered the Mare Island Naval Shipyard for a two-month overhaul. Upon completion of the yard work, the ship returned to San Diego on 7 December for refresher training and preparations for her first deployment to the Far East.

==== 1959–1960 ====
On 15 April 1959 she cleared San Diego in company with the Terrell County (LST-1157) and Washoe County. After stops at Sasebo, Japan and Buckner Bay, Okinawa Washtenaw County got underway with the other ships of PhibRon 1 for SEATO Exercise "Saddle Up," conducted along the coast of British North Borneo. After 19 days of drills, she departed Borneo for a liberty visit to the British crown colony at Hong Kong. Washtenaw County's first western Pacific assignment lasted until September. In the period of time between Exercise "Saddle Up" and the end of the tour, she participated in a number of routine exercises, transported troops and equipment, and visited such ports as Sasebo, Numazu, and Yokosuka, in Japan; Naha, Okinawa; and Keelung, Taiwan. On 10 September the tank landing ship was again placed on alert in response to the tense situation in Laos. At the time, it was felt that troops might be required there under the aegis of the United Nations. However, the situation never developed to full crisis proportions, and ships such as Washtenaw County were not needed to lift troops into the area. Consequently, the tank landing ship ended her deployment on schedule, returned to the west coast in November, and resumed normal operations out of San Diego. Late in June 1960 Washtenaw County travelled across the Pacific Ocean to her new home port, Yokosuka, Japan, arriving on 12 July. A brief period for voyage repairs followed, and then she was off to join the 7th Fleet in training operations in the Philippines near Manila.

=== Vietnam War ===
==== 1960–1964 ====
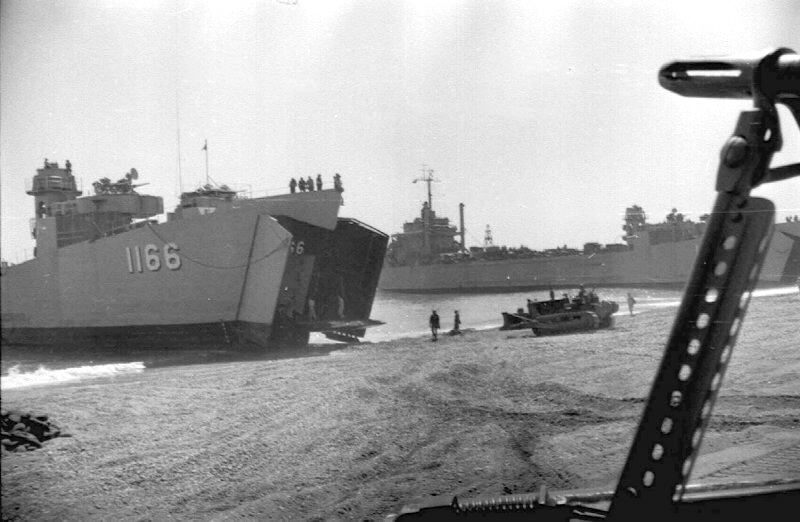
USS Washtenaw County (LST-1166) (foreground) and Washoe County (LST-1165) (background) beached at Pohang, South Korea during "Operation Seven Seas," circa late July-early August 1962

Washtenaw County's final 13 years of service in the U.S. Navy can be divided easily into two phases: the period before America's buildup in South Vietnam, and the period of that involvement. The first phase was characterized by routine operations in support of the 7th Fleet Amphibious Force and encompassed the period from 1960 to 1964. During that time, she carried troops and equipment to various bases in the Far East, including a trip or two to South Vietnam during the initial stages of the American presence there. More often, however, she engaged in amphibious exercises – both unilateral and with units of foreign navies – as well as goodwill missions to Far Eastern ports. The tank landing ship's itinerary of foreign ports during those four years would read like a travel guide of the Orient, ranging from Korean and Japanese ports in the north to Philippine harbors in the south and across to cities on both coasts of the Southeast Asian peninsula.

==== 1964–1967 ====
Not long after the Gulf of Tonkin Incident in the summer of 1964, however, she began to concentrate increasingly upon the waters around Southeast Asia, though not to the exclusion of other areas. Initially, her efforts in regard to the Vietnam War centered around logistics and troop transportation. During the buildup, the ship carried troops and supplies into Vietnam and took on equipment headed for other American bases. When not engaged in that duty, Washtenaw County continued her routine of amphibious training at Okinawa and in the Philippines with Marine Corps battalion landing teams based at Numazu, Japan.

Throughout the first four years of America's involvement in Vietnam, Washtenaw County's contact with that war remained one of brief visits, though with one notable exception. In January 1967 she helped to pioneer some of the techniques which later became the basis of the doctrines used by the River Patrol and Mobile Riverine Forces. In Operation Deckhouse V, she joined USS Coconino County and USS St. Francis River in conducting the first seaward penetration of the Co Chien River to support an assault launched by the 7th Marines against enemy forces in the area. Otherwise, she made only brief visits to bring in troops and supplies.

==== 1968 ====
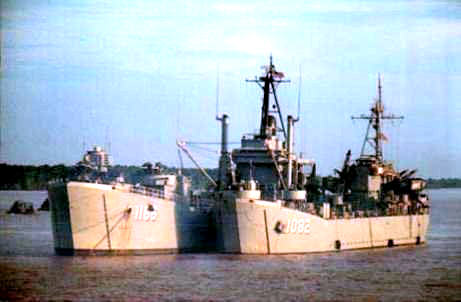
USS Washtenaw County (LST-1166) anchored alongside the smaller LST-542-class Pitkin County (LST-1082), date and location unknown

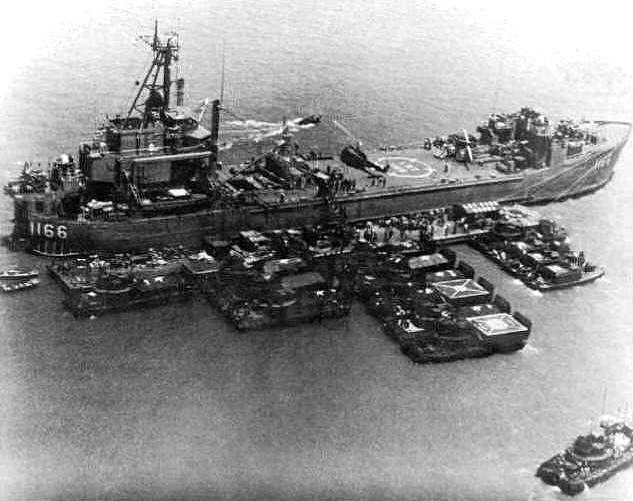
USS Washtenaw County (LST-1166) in the Mekong Delta, circa 1968. Two helicopters sit atop her flight deck.

It was not until 1968 that Washtenaw County began a more intimate association with the war in Vietnam. That phase of her service began as a result of her duty in support of the Mobile Riverine Force operating in the Mekong Delta area of South Vietnam. She departed Yokosuka on 8 January, stopped at Da Nang to unload cargo on the 15th and 16th, and then continued on to the mouth of the Cua Tien River in the Mekong Delta where she arrived on the 17th. The ship anchored there for the night and, the next morning, crossed the bar and headed upriver to join Task Force 117, the Mobile Riverine Force. She relieved Westchester County as support ship for the boats and monitors of the riverine force on 27 January. For three months, she served as a mobile home for 200 Army troops and 170 sailors of the force: a joint Army-Navy organization charged with the mission to control the many waterways in the Mekong Delta. In addition to providing berthing space for men, she also served as a mobile, floating supply depot transporting and issuing tons of ammunition, rations, and other supplies to the gunboats and river monitors operating in the delta.

Washtenaw County ended her assignment in the Mekong Delta on 27 March and headed for Bangkok, Thailand. There, her crew enjoyed five days of rest and relaxation before departing with a Saigon-bound cargo of steel. After a brief stop at Sattahip, Thailand to embark an Army signal company, she reached Saigon on 11 April, unloaded the steel, and then continued on via Naha, Okinawa to Japan. The tank landing ship arrived in Yokosuka on 22 April and began 37 days of upkeep, inspections, and repairs. On 29 May she departed Yokosuka on what was supposed to be a round-trip voyage to Subic Bay and back to her home port. However, two days out, she received a change in orders sending her back to Vietnam at the completion of her mission to the Philippines. On 20 June the ship arrived at Can Tho in the Mekong Delta and relieved Vernon County as the support LST for the Mobile Riverine Force. This time, she remained only one month and made just nine river transits before USS Whitfield County relieved her on 20 July. After a visit to Kaohsiung, Taiwan and another to Naha, the ship reentered Yokosuka on 5 August.

Another period of repairs, upkeep, and inspections followed as well as a training exercise with units of the Republic of Korea (ROK) Navy at Chin Hae late in September. At the completion of those exercises, the ship returned to Yokosuka on 7 October to prepare for another tour of duty in Vietnam. Ten days later, she put to sea again for the combat zone. Before joining the riverine forces, however, she completed a brief assignment at Vung Tau. She arrived there on 26 October and began a two-week assignment in support of Operation Bold Dragon VIII, an amphibious search-and-destroy mission conducted at Phu Quoc Island by TF 115, the Coastal Surveillance Force. Washtenaw County joined USS Weiss and two AH-1 Cobra helicopter gunships in providing naval gunfire support for Navy SEAL teams engaged in the actual operation. She completed her assignment with TF 115 on 7 November and headed on to Dong Tam (Dong Tam Base Camp) to join TF 117. She arrived on the 10th and relieved Westchester County, heavily damaged below the waterline by a bomb planted by a Viet Cong swimmer. Her emergency assignment to the riverine forces lasted less than a month, though, because Whitfield County took over as support LST on 2 December and released Washtenaw County for a liberty call at Hong Kong followed by a return to Yokosuka on 20 December.

==== 1969 ====
She remained at Yokosuka for about a month, departing again on 21 January 1969 for minor repairs at Subic Bay and thence returned to Vietnam. After loading ammunition at Baie de Binh Ba and Vung Tau on 2 and 3 February, she relieved Terrell County as support LST for the Coastal Surveillance Force's Operation Market Time. For the next six weeks, she served as a mobile supply ship for the smaller patrol craft engaged in the interdiction of enemy coastwise logistics efforts. On one occasion, 20 February, she entered the fray herself, when her 3-inch guns were called upon to support the smaller craft with naval gunfire. On 23 March Westchester County relieved her as support ship, and Washtenaw County moved out for Yokosuka by way of Keelung, Taiwan. She reached her home port on 3 April and began an extended overhaul which lasted until late August.

On 26 August she put to sea again, this time to join Amphibious Ready Group "Alpha" at Da Nang. She reached her destination on 3 September and spent the next two days loading Marines and equipment for the first phase of Operation Defiant Stand. Before dawn on 7 September Washtenaw County debarked her complement of Marines which made up the first and second waves of the first phase. Over the next three days, the ship embarked troops of the 5th and 6th Companies of the ROK Marine Brigade for the second phase of the amphibious operation, conducted on 11 September. That landing marked the first combined American-Korean combat operation since the end of the Korean War in 1953. After a five-day Hong Kong visit and an 11-day upkeep period at Subic Bay, Washtenaw County rejoined Amphibious Ready Group "Alpha" at Da Nang on 19 October. A month later, she was reassigned to Amphibious Ready Group "Bravo" for a short time before heading for a visit at Manila. From there she steamed to Naha, Okinawa, to pick up marines for transportation to Japan. Upon her arrival there, she disembarked the marines at Numazu and returned to Yokosuka, where she spent the remainder of the year.

==== 1970 ====
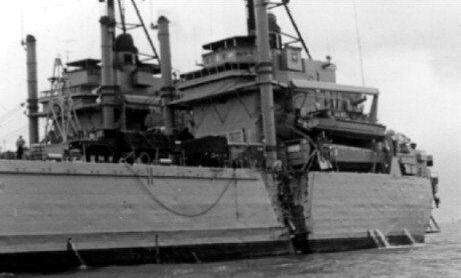
Damage to USS Washtenaw County (LST-1166) as a result of a collision with the SS Kota Selatan while entering Hong Kong Harbor in 1970

Washtenaw County made a brief visit to Vietnam in late February to participate in Operation Keystone Blue Jay but spent most of her time during the first part of 1970 conducting amphibious exercises. While entering Hong Kong on 18 May, the ship suffered extensive damage when a merchant steamer, SS Kota Selatan, struck her. She continued into the harbor where temporary repairs were made during the next 11 days. She then departed the British colony for Yokosuka where she entered drydock for permanent repairs on 12 June.

Washtenaw County completed repairs and left drydock on 22 July. Two days later, she embarked marines at Numazu for transportation to Okinawa. Following that voyage, she returned to Yokosuka, where she remained until mid-August. When not in port at Yokosuka, during the rest of the year, the ship supported 7th Fleet training activities. Most frequently, her training took her to the Philippines where she operated out of Subic Bay. The major exercise scheduled for that fall, Operation Fortress Light, a joint Philippine-American amphibious exercise set for the last half of October, had to be cancelled due to heavy typhoon activity in the area. While the rest of her task force headed south to assist victims of storm damage, Washtenaw County debarked Philippine Navy men and picked up elements of the "aggressor force" positioned earlier at Paluan Bay for the exercise. After returning those troops to Manila, the ship headed for Taiwan where she made a five-day visit to Kaohsiung. Following that, she steamed back to Subic Bay for 11 days of upkeep during the second week in November. On the 16th, she got underway for Okinawa to transport marines there from the Philippines. She reached her destination on the 20th, disembarked her troops and cargo, and picked up 261 marines bound for Japan. She departed the Ryukyus on 25 November, delivered her passengers to Numazu on 1 December, and then returned to Yokosuka, where she remained through the end of the year.

==== 1971 ====
The year 1971 brought a resumption of duty in South Vietnam. Upon completion of a restricted availability at Yokosuka in January, Washtenaw County departed Japan to rejoin TF 115, the Coastal Surveillance Force, off the coast of Vietnam. For almost three months, the ship provided logistics support for "Market Time" operations, the interdiction of enemy coastal and coastwise logistics operations, in the vicinity of Vung Tau and Da Nang. In mid-April, the ship headed back to Japan, where she spent several weeks undergoing extensive repairs. Following that, she was engaged in a number of logistic lifts as well as amphibious training at Okinawa. She also managed a visit each to Hong Kong and Kaohsiung before entering another period of restricted availability in preparation for her return to the Vietnamese combat zone. On 27 September she stood out of Yokosuka for South Vietnam. There, she resumed logistic support duties for Operation Market Time as well as some shore bombardment and patrol assignments. At the conclusion of her deployment in December, she loaded troops and equipment upriver on the Cua Tien and departed Vietnam for Yokosuka by way of Subic Bay. The ship reached Japan on 20 December and began post-deployment standdown.

==== 1972 ====
Washtenaw County began the year 1972 at Yokosuka and departed her home port on 31 January for Iwakuni where she embarked marines for training at Okinawa. During the next two months, she made two such voyages between Japanese ports and Okinawa to carry marines to the Ryukyus for training exercises. She concluded the second round trip at Yokosuka on 19 March. After a six-week availability, she departed Japan for her only Vietnam deployment of the year. She made a stop at Subic Bay to load ammunition desperately needed by 7th Fleet ships which were fighting hard to stem the North Vietnamese Easter Offensive. She reached Da Nang on 21 May, unloaded the ammunition, and then headed for Qui Nhon. During this tour of duty in Vietnam, the ship served at Qui Nhon until 10 July as a mobile helicopter platform in support of coastal radar stations engaged in Market Time operations. Relieved of that duty on 10 July, she made a brief stop at Vung Tau on the 11th before continuing on to Bangkok, Thailand, for a four-day port visit. From there, she moved to Singapore and thence to Keelung, Taiwan, via Subic Bay. From Keelung, Washtenaw County headed back to Yokosuka, arriving there on 12 August. For the remainder of the year, the ship steamed from port to port in the Far East making goodwill visits and transporting marines between Japan and Okinawa. By 22 November, she was back in Yokosuka to begin an extended period of repairs and modifications. Those modifications continued into 1973.

==== 1973, Special Device Minesweeper ====
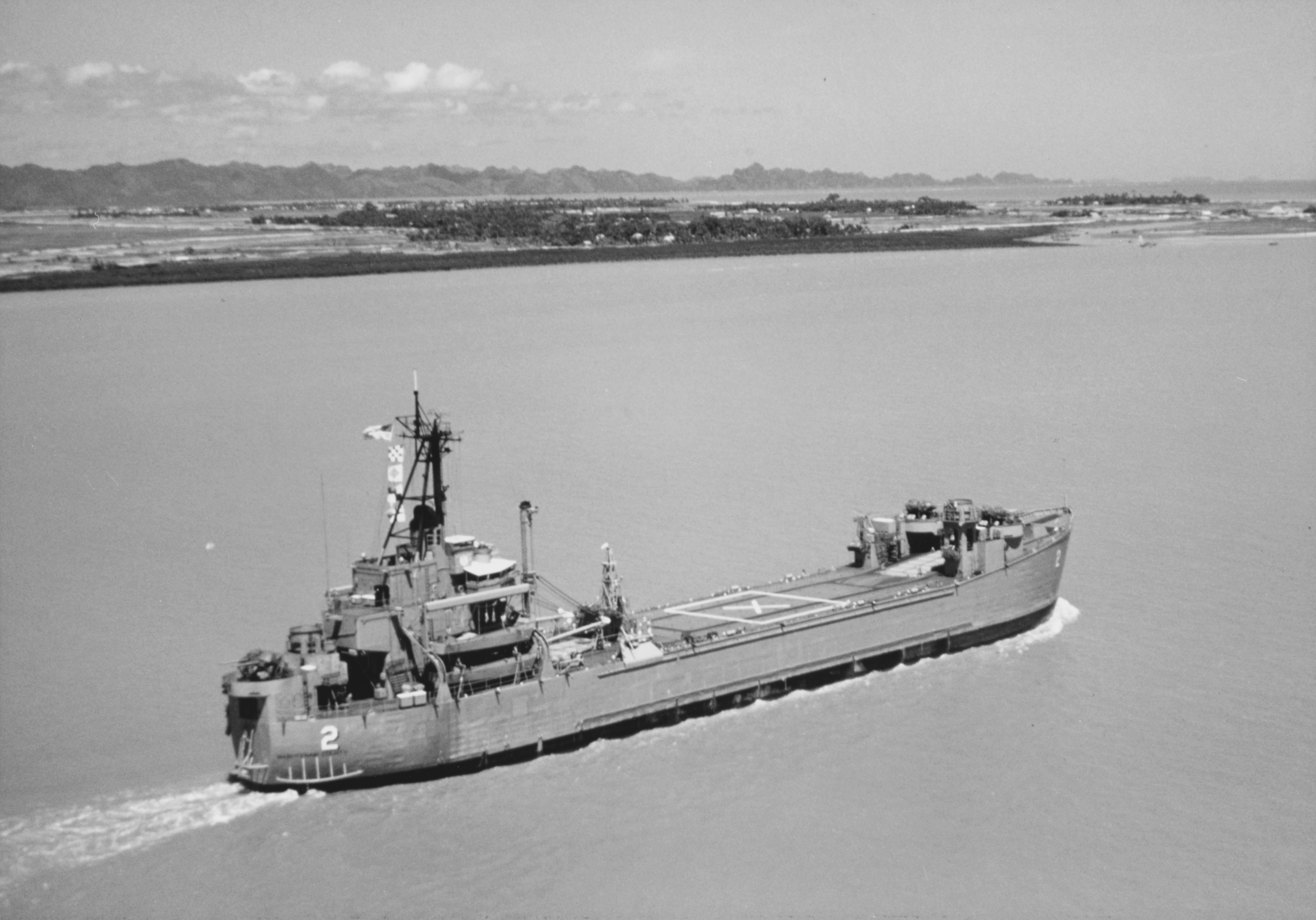
Washtenaw County (MSS-2) underway in Haiphong harbor, North Vietnam in June 1973

On 9 February 1973 Washtenaw County was decommissioned at Yokosuka after completing conversion to a "Special Device Minesweeper" and became Washtenaw County (MSS-2). That same day, she departed Yokosuka for Subic Bay where she underwent a restricted availability in preparation for minesweeping operations to be conducted along the coast of North Vietnam. On 2 April the ship stood out of Subic Bay, bound for Haiphong harbor in North Vietnam. She reached that port on 6 April and joined TF 78, the force assigned to sweep up the mines following the termination of hostilities between the United States and North Vietnam.

Washtenaw County served as a special type of auxiliary craft to check the channels for mines. Specially configured for that purpose over the previous two months and manned by a volunteer skeleton crew, she was to make several transits of the mined areas to ascertain whether or not sweeping operations had to be made. She made her first six runs on 14 April, thereby becoming the first American ship to enter Haiphong in over a decade. She was scheduled to make an additional six transits the next day; but, after the first two, political complications in the negotiations between the United States and North Vietnam caused an interruption in minesweeping operations. Ultimately, Washtenaw County took a 50-day break in operations at Subic Bay while the negotiators resolved the political difficulties. On 15 June, she departed Subic Bay once more and reached Haiphong again on the morning of 20 June. She completed her assignments in Operation End Sweep and departed Haiphong. She returned to Subic Bay in July to await the completion of other phases of the operation. On 24 July she headed for Yokosuka with Westchester County and reached that port on 30 July. Washtenaw County completed final deactivation work during the following month, and her name was struck from the Naval Vessel Register on 30 August 1973.

== Awards ==
Washtenaw County earned 17 battle stars, two Presidential Unit Citations, two Navy Unit Commendations, and four Meritorious Unit Commendations for Vietnam service.

== Commercial service ==
Washtenaw County was sold to Arthur A. Raz in 1983. After his purchase, it partially sank in the Willamette River due to a frozen pipe.

== Current situation ==
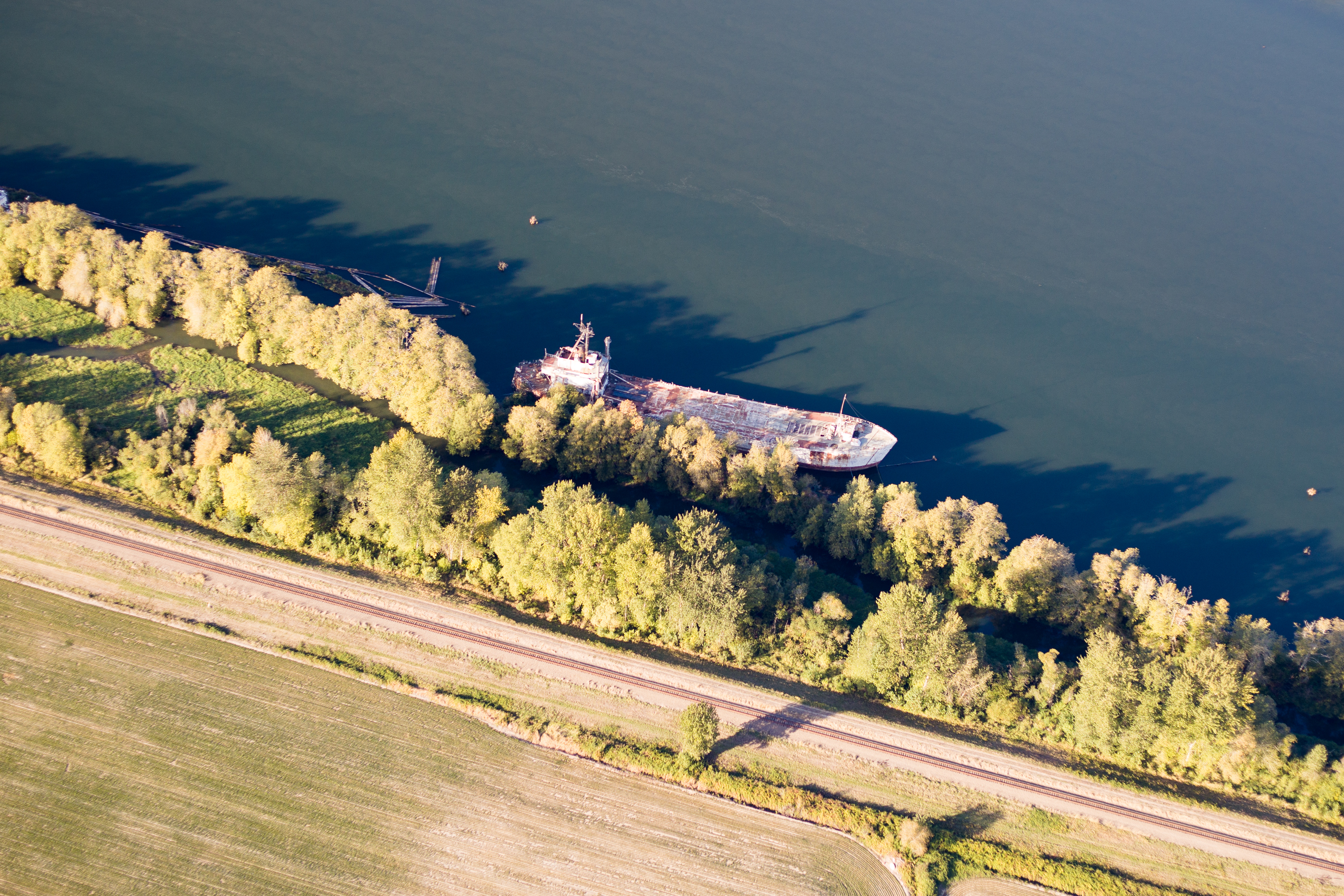
An aerial view of USS Washtenaw County, moored near Rainier, Oregon, taken 8 October 2017

The former Washtenaw County LST-1166 has been moored since 2003 in a backwater of the Columbia River near Rainier, Oregon. Some had hoped to restore it as a museum ship, however it is damaged beyond reconstruction from vandalism and there is no current plan to do so. In October 2008, coast guard reported the location of the ship at 46°07′18″ N 123°00′51″ W. Environmental concerns preclude disposing of the ship by towing it into the ocean and sinking it.

Since 2005, several cases of metal theft from her have been reported to local authorities. The ship has also been used as a party destination by teenagers and young adults. In 2007, more than US$100,000 in materials were stolen, including brass coverings over generators and motors, lift boats, and plumbing. It also has been reported that thieves ripped asbestos up to get to wire and piping on the ship, and that the thieves caused extensive flooding damage. Its future is currently in doubt due to the amount of damage and environmental problems, and a lack of funding to fix them.

Three residents from the Longview/Kelso, Washington area, Clifford Lee O'Dell Polston, Christine Faith Wilson, and Scott Chandler Miller, were arrested on 5 September 2007 on a boat near the ship. Wilson was also charged with possession of methamphetamine. Several days later on 8 September, Michael L. Lauman from Bremerton, Washington was arrested on board the ship on suspicion of first degree theft.

Metal thieves caused leaks and other damages to the ship while they were looting. In June 2008, the United States Coast Guard and the Port of Portland (Oregon) ordered the owner to submit plans for hazardous material abatement. The local non-profit which owns it was unable to meet the requirements causing the Coast Guard to have to oversee the operations. The clean up had cost state and federal agencies nearly $1 million.

== See also ==
- Harry L. Glucksman (MSS-1)
- List of United States Navy LSTs
- List of mine warfare vessels of the United States Navy
