= USS Terrell County =

US naval vessel (1952–1971)

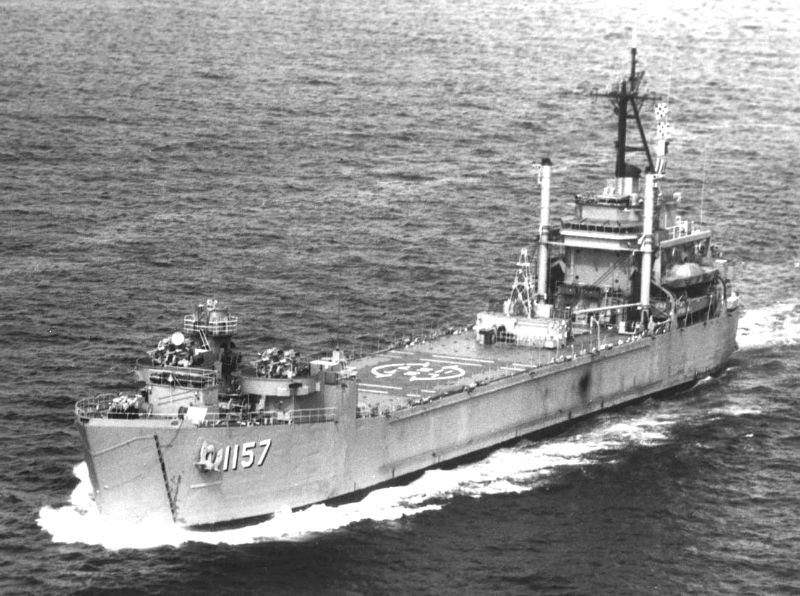
- USS Terrell County (LST-1157).

History

United States
- Name: USS LST-1157
- Builder: Bath Iron Works, Bath, Maine
- Laid down: 3 March 1952
- Launched: 6 December 1952
- Sponsored by: Mrs. John H. Spiller
- Commissioned: 14 March 1953
- Renamed: USS Terrell County (LST-1157), 1 July 1955
- Namesake: Counties in Georgia, Texas
- Decommissioned: 25 March 1971
- Stricken: 1 November 1976
- Honors and awards: 12 campaign stars for Vietnam War service; Presidential Unit Citation; Navy Unit Commendation; Three Meritorious Unit Commendations
- Fate: Loaned to Greece; sold outright to Greece, March 1977

Greece
- Name: Oinoussai
- Namesake: Oinousses
- Acquired: 17 March 1977
- Decommissioned: 20 March 2003
- Identification: L104

General characteristics
- Class & type: Terrebonne Parish-class tank landing ship
- Displacement: 2,590 tons (light), 5,800 tons (full load)
- Length: 384 ft 0 in (117.04 m)
- Beam: 55 ft 0 in (16.76 m)
- Draft: 17 ft 0 in (5.18 m)
- Installed power: 6,000 shaft horsepower (4.48 megawatts)
- Propulsion: Four General Motors 16-278A diesel engines, two controllable pitch propellers
- Speed: 14 knots (26 km/h)
- Boats & landing craft carried: Three LCVPs, one LCPL
- Troops: 395 (15 officers and 380 enlisted men)
- Complement: 205 (16 officers and 189 enlisted men)
- Armament: 3 x twin 3 in (76 mm) 50-caliber gun mounts; 5 x single 20 mm gun mounts

USS Terrell County (LST-1157), originally USS LST-1157, was a Terrebonne Parish-class tank landing ship built for the United States Navy in 1952. Named for Terrell County, Texas, and Terrell County, Georgia, she was the only U.S. Navy vessel to bear the name. She was later lent to Greece and subsequently sold to Greece, being renamed Oinoussai (L104) in Greek service.

== Early career ==
USS LST-1157 was designed under project SCB 9A, laid down on 3 March 1952 at Bath, Maine, by Bath Iron Works and launched on 6 December 1952, sponsored by Mrs. John H. Spiller. She was commissioned on 14 March 1953.

Following shakedown training and operations out of Naval Amphibious Base Little Creek at Virginia Beach, Virginia, LST-1157 departed Morehead City, North Carolina, on 25 September 1953 with a full load of United States Marines and amphibious vehicles for transfer to the United States Pacific Fleet and arrived in San Diego, on 25 October 1953.

Assigned to Amphibious Forces, Pacific Fleet, LST-1157 operated out of San Diego into February 1954 before getting underway for the Central Pacific. She soon took part in moving natives from northern islands in the Marshall Islands to new homes in southern islands in May and June 1954. This lift involved the shipment of lumber for new homes, schools, and churches, as well as of the personal belongings and livestock of the natives. She returning to a routine of local operations on the West Coast of the United States upon arrival at Port Chicago, California, on 2 July 1954.

LST-1157 was renamed USS Terrell County (LST-1157) on 1 July 1955.

Terrell County departed the U.S. West Coast on 9 September 1955 for her first Western Pacific (WestPac) deployment. She operated out of ports in Okinawa and Japan before returning to the U.S. West Coast and resuming local operations.

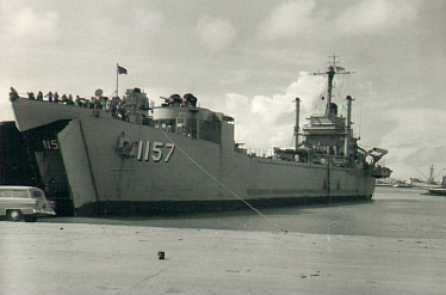
USS Terrell County at Naha, Okinawa in 1957.

Terrell County's second Western Pacific deployment commenced on 13 August 1957. In the succeeding months, she steamed a total of 25,600 nautical miles (47,400 km; 29,500 mi), conducted three amphibious landing exercises and four troop lifts, and transported 500 vehicles and 1,500 men in five beachings and nine "marriages" to landing causeway sections. She also served as flagship for Landing Ship Squadron One.

The sudden flare-up of tension halfway around the world in Lebanon in 1958 temporarily interrupted Terrell County's routine. She sailed for Pearl Harbor and conducted emergency exercises in the Hawaiian area before the Middle Eastern crisis abated.

Departing the U.S. West Coast on 15 April 1959, Terrell County headed across the Pacific Ocean for her third Western Pacific deployment. She subsequently returned to San Diego in November and began an extensive overhaul.

On 16 June 1960, Terrell County departed the U.S. west Coast for her fourth Western Pacific cruise. In July 1960 her permanent home port was changed from San Diego to Yokosuka, Japan. In the Far East, Terrell County participated in a wide variety of operations with beachings and landings of embarked United States Marines and their equipment. Occasionally, maneuvers with warships of other Southeast Asia Treaty Organization (SEATO) member countries took place in locales ranging from Thailand to South Korea and from Borneo to the Philippine Islands. Liberties at Hong Kong and Tokyo brightened a sometimes uneventful deployment while typhoon evasions, too, were common occurrences.

== Vietnam War service ==
Following the Gulf of Tonkin Incident, on 4 August 1964 Terrell County proceeded to Iwakuni, Japan where she remained on alert until 20 August 1964, when she headed for Yokosuka and extended upkeep. Next, local operations in Japanese and Korean waters occupied Terrell County through the end of 1964. Underway training began the ship's new year in 1965 and lasted through February and into March 1965.

On 12 March 1965 Terrell County departed the Ryūkyū Islands, bound for South Vietnam. She arrived at Da Nang four days later, unloaded embarked men and cargo, and then returned to Yokosuka for major overhaul. The ship returned to Vietnamese waters following the refit and transported Marine Air Control Squadron 9 to Chu Lai Air Base, South Vietnam, before returning to Japanese waters. Operational commitments subsequently overrode refresher training out of Yokosuka in July, forcing the ship to embark Naval Beach Group 1. Dispatched to Okinawa on 1 August 1965, Terrell County evaded a typhoon en route and made port to load Regimental Landing Team 7 before sailing on 9 August 1965 for Chu Lai. Remaining at that American base from 15 to 17 August, the ship evaded two typhoons en route back to Japanese waters before she reached Yokosuka on 25 August.

Following further refresher training and an upkeep period, Terrell County got underway for South Korea on 21 October 1965 and arrived at Pusan, South Korea, on 23 October 1965. She embarked elements of the Republic of Korea Army Tiger Division. Departing Pusan on 25 October 1965, Terrell County arrived at Qui Nhơn, South Vietnam, on 2 November 1965 and debarked the South Korean troops.

Terrell County operated in support of Operation Blue Marlin from 4 to 17 November 1965; included in this deployment was a landing near Chu Lai and a trip to Da Nang, South Vietnam, with support equipment on board. Once she completed this assignment, she received orders to proceed to Nha Trang and thence to Cam Ranh Bay for further operations. On 21 November she embarked South Korean Marines and United States Army support units for transport to Tuy Hòa. Soon after reaching Tuy Hòa, Terrell County, with her troops still embarked, broached in the heavy surf and went aground. On 24 November the fleet tugs USS Molala and USS Mahopac succeeded in pulling Terrell County off the beach and towed to Nha Trang, VN. Subsequently patched and pumped dry, she got underway on 2 December 1965, under tow for Yokosuka. She was subsequently towed to Mitsubishi Shipyards in Yokohama, Japan, where permanent repairs were made to her damaged hull.

The restoration work was complete on 22 February 1966, and the ship got underway for Naha, Okinawa. She embarked men and equipment of the Army's 1st Engineering Battalion and transported them to Vietnam. She completed the task on 7 March and then made another transport run from 14 March 1966 to 26 March 1966, carrying American troops from Naha to Saigon, South Vietnam.

After coastal operations off Vietnam from 27 March to 5 May, Terrell County retired to Japan on one shaft, since her starboard shaft had ceased functioning. On 13 May, as she crept along toward Yokosuka, her lookouts sighted the Soviet merchant ship Makhachala two points abaft the starboard beam and closing. Both ships continued steady on their courses, as Terrell County assumed that the heavily laden Soviet ship would stay clear. Finally, both ships were forced to maneuver radically to avert a collision, with the Soviet vessel passing close aboard at Terrell County's port aft quarter.

Shaft troubles continued to plague the landing ship but did not interfere with the completion of her transport and cargo missions. She continued these duties into the Autumn of 1966. In October 1966, Terrell County sailed to Tacloban, Leyte, RP to serve as the United States representative at the 22nd annual Battle of Leyte Gulf celebration, which commemorated General MacArthur's return and the American landings of 1944 supported by an earlier breed of LSTs.

Subsequently completing a Nuclear Weapons Acceptance Inspection (the first ship in her squadron to do so), Terrell County conducted two more transport lifts—both to Chu Lai, Vietnam—before rounding out the year 1966 by joining Task Unit 76.0.7 as part of the Da Nang-Chu Lai shuttle. The ship remained with Task Unit 76.0.7 until 18 January 1967, when she sailed for Okinawa. She proceeded from there to her home port, Yokosuka. Transport operations to Okinawa, intermingled with type and refresher training exercises, continued through the spring of 1967.

On 9 July Terrell County relieved landing ship tank USS Tom Green County as part of Amphibious Ready Group Bravo, TG 76.5, then engaged in the midst of Operations Beaver Track and Buffalo. Given the mission of "sea-trailer" or contingency logistics, she carried ammunition, medical supplies, and vehicles assigned to the 2nd Battalion, 3rd Marine Division, the Marine units bearing the brunt of the fighting ashore. For two months, Terrell County supported operations in Quảng Trị Province, just south of the demilitarized zone (DMZ), and conducted a series of landings in rapid succession: Bear Chain, Kangaroo Kick, and Belt Drive, before heading for Hong Kong on 19 September 1967.

Following visits to Okinawa and Subic Bay, Terrell County loaded ammunition and causeway sections and departed Yokosuka on 1 March 1968, bound for Vietnam. However, while steaming in company with two of her sister ships, tank landing ships USS Washoe County and USS Westchester County, Terrell County lost two causeways which were torn loose by heavy seas. Returning to Yokosuka, Terrell County obtained replacement sections and embarked Amphibious Construction Battalion (ACB) 1 before getting underway again and rejoining Washoe County and Westchester County en route to South Vietnam. Arriving at Da Nang on 13 March, she delivered her causeways and proceeded to Tien Sha to unload her ammunition and to take on the gear necessary for her forthcoming operations.

Joining the Amphibious Ready Group once again, Terrell County operated off Mỹ Thủy, South Vietnam, from 15 March to 12 April 1968 before retiring to Subic Bay. She rendezvoused with the landing platform helicopter USS Valley Forge off Vietnam on 29 April 1968 for operations on station in area "Alice". Subsequently sailing for Hong Kong on 12 May for a five-day visit, Terrell County headed for Buckner Bay, Okinawa, to deliver cargo from Da Nang before moving to Yokosuka for an overhaul which lasted through the summer of 1968. Training and drills occupied the ship well into the autumn of 1968 before she proceeded back to Vietnam.

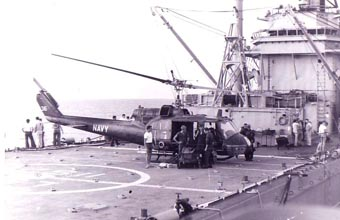
A view of the Terrell County's flight deck as taken from USS Clarion River, alongside. A UH-1B Huey helicopter is being tended to.

From 1 to 7 December 1968, Terrell County conducted general drills and gunnery exercises before beaching at Vũng Tàu to load ammunition. On 10 December 1968, she relieved Washoe County as support LST for Task Force 115 on Operation Market Time, the interdiction operation attempting to interrupt North Vietnamese logistics operations in South Vietnamese coastal waters.

On 1 January 1969 Terrell County, still supporting Operation Market Time, was assigned additional duty as support ship for the fast Fast Patrol Craft (PCF) boats engaged in riverine operations off the lower Cà Mau Peninsula. Three days after undertaking this duty, the LST launched her LCVPs to participate in an assault north of Song Ong Doc, in conjunction with PCFs and Song Ong Due regional forces. When Viet Cong (VC) gunners opened fire on the allied force, Terrell County returned the fire, killing five VC and assisting in the successful withdrawal of the assault forces.

Terrell County then participated in other operations against the VC, firing on their positions along the banks of the Song Bp De River and the Duong Keo River, coordinating PCFs, aircraft, and ships' batteries in firing on VC concentrations and staging areas. As a result of these operations, VC extortion from local South Vietnamese foresters and fishermen in the lower Cà Mau peninsula was substantially, albeit temporarily, curtailed. Relieved as Market Time support LST, Terrell County got underway on 5 February 1969 for the Philippines and arrived at Subic Bay on 11 February 1969.

Training and local operations in Japanese, Okinawan, and Philippine waters preceded yet another Vietnam deployment which commenced upon Terrell County's arrival at Vũng Tàu on 8 May 1969. The next day, she relieved Westchester County and found that the tempo of operations in the lower Cà Mau peninsula had increased. With 50 men of the Mobile Strike Force embarked, as well as a U.S. Army scout helicopter and a U.S. Navy Underwater Demolition Team (UDT) detachment, Terrell County provided support for multifaceted operations designed to destroy VC factories, training and supply camps, and extortion stations. She remained on station in the Cà Mau region until 25 June.

A visit to Hong Kong from 8 to 24 July preceded Terrell County's sailing for Yokosuka and upkeep. The ship subsequently carried causeways to Da Nang, Vietnam before resuming duties as support LST for continued interdiction and pacification operations at her old haunt, Cà Mau.

From 10 October to 25 November 1969, Terrell County supported Operation Seafloat. With an embarked helicopter detachment, she undertook refueling and rearming of helicopters, and provided ammunition and services for PCFs, SEAL teams, and troops. She also undertook small boat and PCF maintenance, as well as providing numerous personal services—laundry and small stores, to name but two. During this period, Terrell County established regular mail deliveries to off-shore units by helicopter, the first such services provided in the Cà Mau vicinity. On 15 October she fired a gunfire-support mission against VC vessels.

On 25 November 1969, tank landing ship USS Vernon County came alongside, and Terrell County entrusted her Seafloat support duties to Vernon County before sailing for Da Nang. Loading troops and equipment on 30 November 1969, she got underway on 1 December 1969 to neutralize a threatened mortar attack before returning and refueling from SS Hampton Roads.

Terrell County then returned again to Vũng Tàu, relieving tank landing ship Washoe County as Seafloat support vessel, providing fuel, ammunition, and communications support for a brood of smaller craft. She also assisted the landing craft repair ship USS Krishna by receiving Krishna's stores from provision ships and delivering them, and by also serving as a platform upon which Krishna's mail and spare parts could be helicoptered in. Terrell County also provided repair and maintenance services for PCFs and smaller craft, such as PBRs. She remained at this duty through the spring of 1970.

When American forces invaded Cambodia in the spring of 1970, Terrell County operated as "contingency LST" from 17 to 19 May 1970. She then proceeded to Da Nang to pick up equipment and a "Seabee" causeway section for transport to Yokosuka. Soon after reaching Yokosuka, she commenced an upkeep period which lasted until 1 August 1970. A trip to Hong Kong and a final deployment to Vietnam rounded out Terrell County's stay in the Far East.

On 1 October 1970 the Panama-registered freighter SS Tung Yang lost all power and wallowed in heavy seas. Terrell County and Washoe County went to the ship's assistance, and Terrell County passed a towline to Tung Yang. By midafternoon on 2 October 1970, Tung Yang rode at the end of the towline but, late the next day, the tow parted, and Tung Yang was once again adrift. The rescue and salvage ship USS Deliver, also in the area, soon retrieved the tow, and thus allowed Terrell County to proceed to Chu Lai. After loading U.S. Marine Corps and U.S. Navy vehicles, Terrell County departed Chu Lai on 6 October 1970 for Subic Bay. Arriving there on 8 October 1970, she took on supplies and got underway on 9 October 1970 in company with her sister ship Washoe County and three Military Sealift Command ships. The two LSTs provided support services for these craft during the long voyage to the U.S. West Coast.

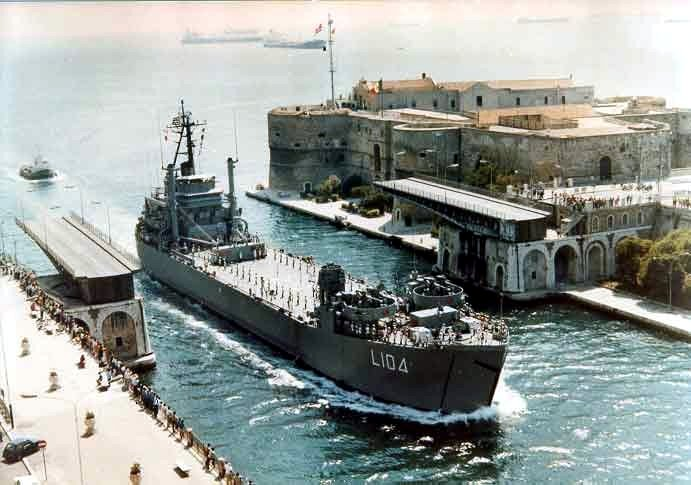
The ex-USS Terrell County in Greek service as Oinoussai (L104) entering port at Taranto, Italy, date unknown.

The little convoy arrived at San Diego on 11 November 1970. After off-loading her cargo on 13 November 1970, Terrell County proceeded to San Francisco, California, for four days liberty before continuing northward. She reached Bremerton, Washington, on 24 November 1970 and was placed in "in commission, in reserve" status. Her inactivation work lasted into the new year.

== Decommissioning and transfer to Greece ==
On 25 March 1971 Terrell County was decommissioned at the Puget Sound Naval Shipyard at Bremerton and placed in the Reserve Fleet there. She was berthed at the Pier "D" Inactive Ship Facility at Bremerton.

Transferred, on loan, to Greece under the Security Assistance Program, she was renamed Oinoussai (L104) in Hellenic Navy service and was stricken from the Naval Vessel Register on 1 November 1976.

Sold outright to Greece in March 1977, Oinoussai was decommissioned by the Greek Navy on 20 March 2003.
