= USS Vernon County =

Tank landing ship in the US Navy

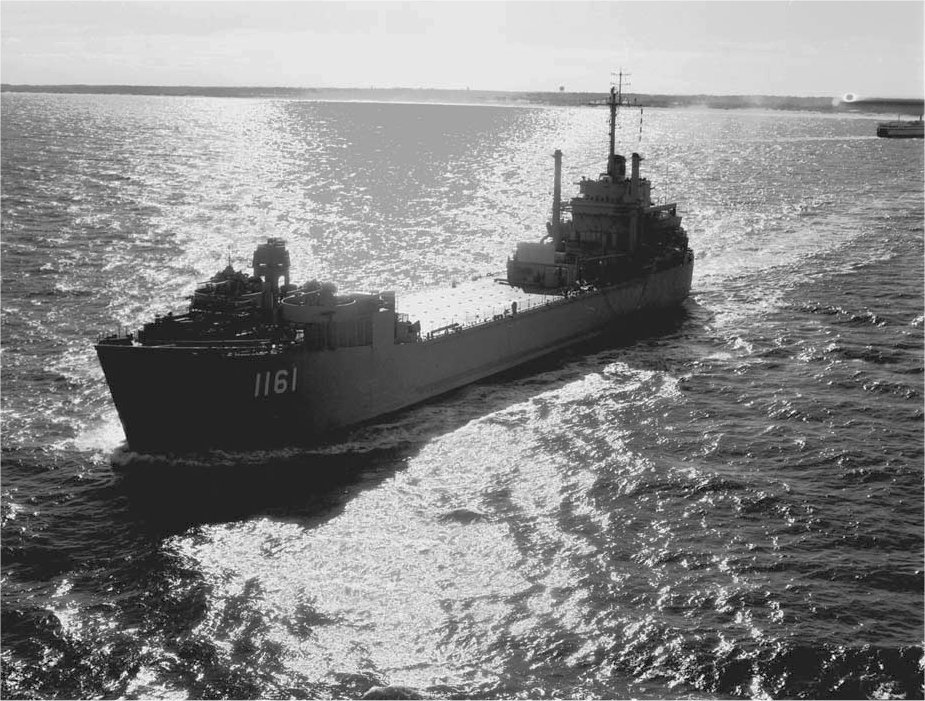
- USS Vernon County (LST-1161)

History

United States
- Name: USS Vernon County (LST-1161)
- Namesake: Vernon County, Missouri, Vernon County, Wisconsin, and Vernon Parish, Louisiana
- Builder: Ingalls Shipbuilding Corporation, Pascagoula Mississippi
- Laid down: 14 April 1952
- Launched: 25 November 1952
- Sponsored by: Mrs. Hugh White
- Commissioned: 18 May 1953
- Decommissioned: 14 June 1973
- Renamed: From USS LST-1161 to USS Vernon County 1 July 1955
- Stricken: 1 December 1977
- Honors and awards: Presidential Unit Citation; Three Meritorious Unit Commendations; Three Navy Unit Commendations; 13 campaign stars for Vietnam War service.
- Fate: Loaned to Venezuela 29 June 1973; Sold to Venezuela 1 December 1977
- Notes: Served in Venezuelan Navy as Amazonas (T-21)

Venezuela
- Name: Amazonas (T-21)
- Namesake: Amazonas
- Acquired: On loan from 29 June 1973, purchased 1 December 1977

General characteristics
- Class & type: Terrebonne Parish-class tank landing ship
- Displacement: 2,590 tons (light), 5,800 tons (full)
- Length: 384 ft 0 in (117.04 m)
- Beam: 55 ft 0 in (16.76 m)
- Draft: 17 ft 0 in (5.18 m)
- Installed power: 6,000 shaft horsepower (4.48 megawatts)
- Propulsion: Four General Motors 16-278A diesel engines, two controllable pitch propellers
- Speed: 14 knots (26 km/h)
- Boats & landing craft carried: Three LCVPs, one LCPL
- Troops: 395 (15 officers and 380 enlisted men)
- Complement: 205 (16 officers and 189 enlisted men
- Armament: Three twin 3 in (76 mm) 50-caliber gun mounts; Five single 20 mm gun mounts

USS Vernon County (LST-1161) was a United States Navy, Terrebonne Parish-class tank landing ship in commission from 1953 to 1973. She saw extensive service in the Vietnam War before being transferred to the Venezuelan Navy, where she became Amazonas (T-21).

== Construction and commissioning ==
Vernon County was designed under project SCB 9A and laid down as USS LST-1161 on 14 April 1952 at Pascagoula, Mississippi, by Ingalls Shipbuilding Corporation and launched on 25 November 1952;, sponsored by Mrs. Hugh White, the wife of the then-governor of Mississippi, Hugh L. White. USS LST-1161 was commissioned on 18 May 1953.

== Atlantic, Caribbean, and Mediterranean operations, 1953–1958 ==
After conducting her shakedown cruise, LST-1161 operated off the United States East Coast out of Naval Amphibious Base Little Creek at Virginia Beach, Virginia, and Morehead City, North Carolina, through mid-February 1954. She subsequently deployed twice to Caribbean operating areas during 1954. During an exercise at Vieques Island, Puerto Rico, between 11 April 1954 and 7 May 1954, she participated in the filming of the movie Away All Boats.

LST-1161 entered the Philadelphia Naval Shipyard on 28 July 1954 for extensive modifications. Once those alterations and repairs were completed, she headed for Naval Amphibious Base Little Creek at Virginia Beach, arriving there on 19 December 1954.

LST-1161 was renamed USS Vernon County (LST-1161) on 1 July 1955.

Vernon County operated with the Amphibious Forces of the United States Atlantic Fleet, alternating between Norfolk, Virginia, and Little Creek as her home ports. During her years of operations from those places, she deployed regularly to the North Atlantic, Mediterranean, and Caribbean areas.

== Pacific operations, 1958–1964 ==
In 1958, Vernon County was transferred to the United States Pacific Fleet, sailing via the Panama Canal to her new assigned home port, San Diego, California. She operating from San Diego for over a year and a half, conducting regular periods of underway training and local operations off the Southern California coast.

Vernon County changed home ports again in 1960. On 16 June 1960, she departed the United States West Coast bound for her new home port, Yokosuka, Japan. Together with seven other tank landing ships, Vernon County comprised Amphibious Squadron (PhibRon) 9. They reached Yokosuka on 6 August 1960.

Vernon County subsequently formed an integral part of the amphibious forces supporting the Southeast Asia Treaty Organization (SEATO), participating in SEATO's Operation Tulungan in May 1962. In so doing, she became one of the first American amphibious vessels to transport U.S. Marines to Thailand.

Her first years in Yokosuka saw her participate in many major amphibious exercises, including those named "Pony Express" and "Sharp Edge." After an upkeep period in June 1962, Vernon County transported U.S. Marines from Subic Bay in the Philippines, to Iwakuni, Japan; she paid a port call at Karatsu, Japan, reportedly the first American warship to visit Karatsu since the Korean War (1950–1953).

February 1963 saw Vernon County at Kobe, Japan. In March 1963 she visited Tspying and Kaohsiung, Taiwan, and she spent much of April 1963 at Subic Bay. In June 1963, she participated in Operation Flagpole, a joint United States Seventh Fleet–Republic of Korea (ROK) naval exercise. Before returning to Yokosuka, she called at Shimonoseki, Japan; Naha, Okinawa; and Keelung, Taiwan.

After her return to Yokosuka and subsequent refresher training at Numazu, Japan, Vernon County took part in Operation Litgas in company with other SEATO naval units. Subsequently, returning to Hong Kong, via Yokosuka, she visited Kobe in mid-July 1964.

== Vietnam War service ==
=== Tonkin Gulf Incident ===
For a few days, Vernon County trained in nearby Sagami Bay. She was there when the Tonkin Gulf incident occurred and Vernon County embarked U.S. Marines and steamed for South Vietnam. For the next 60 days, as part of the force thrown into Southeast Asian waters ready for any contingency.

Vernon County was then relieved on station and proceeded back to Yokosuka, but the respite offered was, in retrospect, only a short one.

=== Operations off South Vietnam, January–April 1965 ===
In January 1965, Vernon County again headed for South Vietnamese waters to provide amphibious support. Departing Yokosuka on 8 February 1965, Vernon County proceeded to Iwakuni, Japan and Naha, Okinawa, before pushing on to Da Nang, South Vietnam, where she arrived on 18 February 1965. Upon arrival, she disembarked Company C, 7th Engineer Battalion, to provide construction support for the MIM-23 Hawk light surface-to-air missile battery then being emplaced there, thus completing the Hawk deployment.

Over the ensuing months, Vernon County conducted various operations: loading, offloading, stand-by alerts, and the landing of and equipment on South Vietnamese shores. In April 1965, Vernon County supported the landing of U.S. Marines at Da Nang and brought Marine Corps cargo and equipment from Okinawa to Da Nang.

=== Operations at Chu Lai, 1965 ===
Once the Da Nang landing was completed, Vernon County moved south and took part in one of the largest amphibious undertakings since the 1950 Inchon landings in South Korea when she participated in the 6 May landings at Chu Lai, South Vietnam. In that operation, three U.S. Marine Corps battalion landing teams and a U.S. Navy mobile construction battalion went ashore to initiate construction of an airfield.

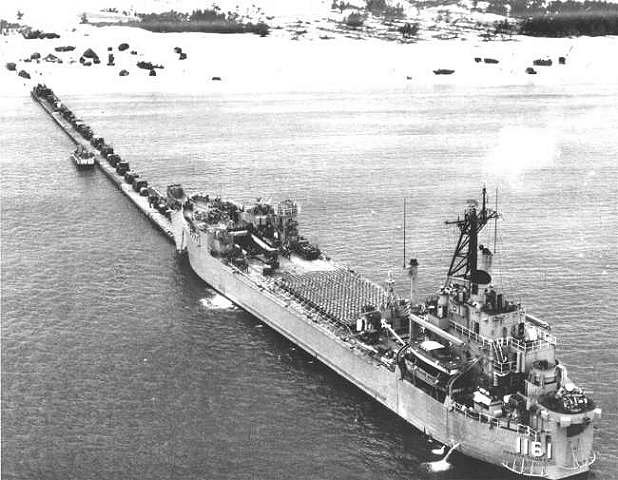
USS Vernon County unloading United States Marines and their equipment at Chu Lai, South Vietnam.

Vernon County then conducted more cargo runs to ensure the steady flow of supplies and equipment to support the ever-expanding Chu Lai beachhead and the development of Chu Lai Air Base to support the operations of a Marine Air Wing. As U.S. Marine reinforcements arrived in the Western Pacific area, Vernon County continued to load and land supplies at Chu Lai.

While Vernon County was carrying out those duties, American military intelligence picked up evidence that a Viet Cong (VC) force was massing for an attack on Chu Lai. Accordingly, a joint U.S. Marine Corps-Army of the Republic of Vietnam (ARVN) operation was launched on 6 August 1965 to search for the VC. In that operation, code-named Operation Thunderbolt, the Marines and South Vietnamese soldiers did not find the VC in strength, meeting only scattered resistance. Nevertheless, the operation was deemed to be, in retrospect, a "Successful experiment in command and control." Subsequently, however, the interrogation of a VC deserter revealed the location of the VC 1st Regiment. It was, as thought, moving toward Chu Lai. Accordingly, another operation, code-named Operation Starlite, was planned expeditiously. Vernon County embarked elements of the 3rd Battalion, 3rd Marines, (Battalion Landing Team) (BLT) 3, under Lieutenant Colonel Joseph E. Muir, at Chu Lai, and moved south along the South Vietnamese coast to An Thuong, where she put the Marines ashore in one phase of Starlite. The operation, involving amphibious, helicopter-borne, and ground forces, started out as a "search and destroy" operation but soon escalated into a battalion-sized offensive against the VC. Starlite thwarted the incipient VC move toward Chu Lai, some nine miles (14 kilometers) to the north, the main battle taking place in the Van Truong village complex. The Marines discovered communication equipment, numerous documents, munitions, rice, and propaganda – all leading intelligence men to estimate that the hamlet of Van Thuong had served as a VC command post. During the operation, Marines of the III Marine Amphibious Force (III MAF) annihilated the VC 60th Battalion and crippled the 40th Battalion. It was the first big battle of the Vietnam War for the Marines, who came away from Starlite confident in their ability to meet the enemy on the field of battle and defeat him.

=== Transportation operations, 1965–1966 ===
Late in October 1965, Vernon County sailed for South Korea and, with other units of the Seventh Fleet, participated in the movement of the Republic of Korea Army "Tiger" Division to South Vietnam. Subsequently, she took part in direct lifts of equipment and troops to South Vietnam before returning to Yokosuka on 25 December 1965.

After operating locally out of Yokosuka and in South Vietnamese waters, primarily at Chu Lai, Vernon County replenished and underwent a period of upkeep at Subic Bay in the Philippines. She then returned to intracoastal shipping operations off the coast of South Vietnam and even penetrated the Mekong Delta to pay a port call at Saigon, South Vietnam. She returned to Yokosuka in early June 1966.

Vernon County trained briefly at Numazu, Japan, before going to Okinawa, and from there to Hong Kong to allow her crew liberty there. Returning to South Vietnamese waters from Hong Kong, she headed for Subic Bay, via Da Nang and Cam Ranh Bay, South Vietnam, soon thereafter, for 13 days of upkeep in the Philippine Islands. Returning to Yokosuka after conducting lifts of men and materiel to Okinawa and Sasebo, Japan, Vernon County remained in port at Yokosuka until 21 September 1966.

=== Operation Market Time, 1966 ===
Ordered back to South Vietnam, Vernon County operated in support of Operation Market Time, the coastal interdiction of communist supply traffic off the coast of South Vietnam, serving as "mother ship" for the Patrol Craft Fast used for those operations. Vernon County remained on station on Market Time duties until 29 November 1966. From there, she went on to Yokosuka, commencing a regularly scheduled shipyard overhaul on 8 December 1966.

=== Upkeep and training in Japan, 1966–1967 ===
Completing those repairs and alterations on 15 March 1967, Vernon County ran sea trials and conducted refresher training before visiting Kobe in April 1967. Subsequently, the ship returned to Yokosuka, where she conducted more training during May 1967.

=== Riverine operations, 1967 ===
Leaving Yokosuka on 6 June 1967, Vernon County was heading for Sasebo when she received orders directing her to return to South Vietnam. Upon arrival, Vernon County became a part of the Mobile Riverine Force (MRF), a joint U.S. Navy-U.S. Army assault unit conducting riverine search and destroy missions in the Mekong Delta region. While assigned to the MRF, Vernon County was a veritable picture of versatility: she carried ammunition for U.S. Army troops, fire support bases, and the U.S. Navy's Patrol Boat, River (or PBRs); she carried boats, clothing, batteries, and C rations for troops in the field; she carried purified water and supplied fuel to various riverine craft; she housed, fed, and entertained over 340 additional U.S. Army and U.S. Navy combat personnel; and she logged over 780 helicopter landings on her flight deck.

Relieved from MRF support duties on 20 August 1967, Vernon County headed for Chu Lai, and from there to Keelung, Taiwan. Reaching Keelung on 30 August 1967, she remained there until 4 September 1967 before moving on, ultimately returning to her home port, Yokosuka, on 8 September 1967.

=== Operations in Japan, Okinawa, and the Philippines, 1967 ===
Vernon County remained in port at Yokosuka until 5 October 1967, when she headed south for Ora Bay, Okinawa, to conduct two days of training with U.S. Marine Corps amphibious forces. Upon completion of training, she shifted to Subic Bay, where she loaded various items for churches, schools, and hospitals at Tacloban on the island of Leyte. She departed Subic Bay on 18 October 1967 and was to represent the United States at ceremonies on 20 October 1967 commemorating the Philippines campaign in World War II. A typhoon brewing in the vicinity, however, forced a cancellation of the ceremonies. Vernon County subsequently returned to Subic Bay, whence she sortied on 23 October 1967 for Yokosuka.

Arriving at Yokosuka on 1 November 1967, Vernon County remained in port there until 20 November 1967, at which time she got underway for Naha, Okinawa, and from there for Subic Bay.

=== Amphibious Ready Group Bravo, 1967–1968 ===
Upon reaching Subic Bay, Vernon County was assigned to Amphibious Ready Group (ARG) Bravo. Underway for South Vietnam on 18 December 1967, she arrived at Cửa Việt Base on 20 December 1967. Over the days that ensued, prior to Christmas (25 December) 1967, she took part in Operation Fortress Ridge in company with the other units of ARG Bravo. In that operation, U.S. Marines from the group landed, unopposed, and swept through the sandy, marshy regions north of the Cửa Việt Base, encountering several pockets of enemy resistance. Helicopter gunships, air strikes, naval gunfire, and artillery all assisted in subduing the enemy in what proved to be the last operation prior to the Christmas truce.

Vernon County took part in her second amphibious operation within a month when she participated in Operation Badger Tooth between 26 December 1967 and 2 January 1968. Helicopter and landing craft-borne U.S. Marines met no opposition in the initial landing, 13 miles (21 kilometres) east of Quảng Trị city but, on 27 December 1967, encountered a stubborn and well-disciplined North Vietnamese unit in the fortified town of Thon Tham Khe. Several hours of intense fighting ensued, with the North Vietnamese eventually withdrawing from the fight.

Vernon County operated with ARG "Bravo", Task Group (TG) 76.5, until 3 February 1968, operating off the South Vietnamese coast between Da Nang and the DMZ (DMZ). After completing her part in Operations Fortress Ridge and Badger Tooth, she remained offshore, devoting a good deal of her time to training because of the slow tempo of operations after those missions against the Viet Cong.

=== Operations in Japan and South Korea, 1968 ===
Vernon County, when relieved of duty with TG 76.5, headed for Japan and returned to her home port of Yokosuka for a scheduled two-month overhaul, after which time she sailed for Korean waters. She conducted joint training with ROK naval units, including a United States detachment from Amphibious Construction Battalion 1 embarked with four pontoon causeways and associated equipment. After a complete slate of exercises, the tank landing ship returned to Japan for upkeep. She then sailed for Okinawa, there loading cargo before proceeding back to Vietnam.

=== Riverine operations, May–June 1968 ===
Offloading her cargo at Wunder Beach, Vernon County shifted operations to the Mekong Delta region, where she assumed the duty of support LST for mobile riverine forces. From 25 May 1968 to 21 June 1968, Vernon County operated as support ship for Task Force (TF) 115, Mobile Riverine Force (MRF) Alfa. During that period, the group operated at Bến Tre, Dong Tam Base Camp, Vĩnh Long, Sa Đéc, Mỹ Tho, and Cần Thơ, all in the Mekong Delta, or IV Corps, area of South Vietnam. In the little over three-week period, Vernon County traveled some 556.5 nautical miles (1,031 kilometers) through South Vietnamese rivers.

The MRF relied upon the support services rendered by the duty LST. Vernon County served as a floating warehouse wherein 600 tons of ammunition, plus non-ordnance support material, could be stowed in the capacious tank deck area. From those supplies, Vernon County supported U.S. Navy river craft, U.S. Army operations in the field, and U.S. Army fire support bases. She, in turn, was replenished by another LST that came up river from the port of Vũng Tàu.

A good deal of activity took place during that period of both base and ship defense; 15 to 20 rounds of 3-inch (76.2-millimeter gunfire were fired nightly for harassment and interdiction; all gun mounts were manned continuously throughout the nocturnal hours, to be fired while the crew was proceeding to their general quarters stations. In addition, six sentries patrolled the pontoons moored alongside, and on the main deck; boats patrolled 150 to 200 yards (140 to 180 meters) away, remaining alert for possible swimmers, naval mines, or traffic of a suspicious nature. Periodically, percussion grenades were tossed into the water as anti-swimmer measures.

Vernon County also served as a landing pad for helicopters making resupply runs both to and from the ship to units in the field; whenever the ship made a transit of the waterways of the Mekong Delta, she stood at general quarters with .50-caliber (12.7-millimeter) and .30-caliber (7.62-millimeter) machine guns mounted to provide the ship with close-range firepower when needed.

Upon relief by tank landing ship USS Washtenaw County on 21 June 1968 at Cần Thơ, Vernon County proceeded down the Bassac River to the South China Sea.

=== Repairs, 1968 ===
Upon reaching the South China Sea, Vernon County headed to Subic Bay for generator repairs. En route and three days out of Vietnamese waters, her commanding officer, Lieutenant Commander L. D. Mott, was stricken with acute appendicitis, necessitating his emergency medical evacuation by air.

Subsequently, Vernon County reached Subic Bay on 24 June 1968. Upon arrival, however, it was found that her generators could not be repaired there, so she moved for Naha, Okinawa, with cargo on board, en route Japan. She offloaded her cargo at Naha and proceeded on, reaching Yokosuka on 13 July 1968. There, the repairs were effected. While at Yokosuka, she received the Navy Unit Commendation for her service with the Mobile Riverine Force.

=== Riverine operations, August–October 1968 ===
Vernon County subsequently returned to South Vietnamese waters, lifting cargo to Vũng Tàu and offloading it while at anchor on 14 August 1968. On 15 August 1968, she proceeded to Nha Be, where she relieved USS Windham County as support LST for Mobile Riverine Assault Force Bravo. For the next two months, she operated primarily in the Nha Be region but also at the junction of the Soirap River and Vam Co River. Midway through that period, the base was shifted to Dong Tam, where Vernon County remained until relieved by USS Caroline County on 16 October 1968.

Sailing to Kaohsiung, Taiwan, with a cargo of jeeps, and encountering Tropical Storm Hester en route, Vernon County visited Hong Kong for rest and recreation before returning to Yokosuka in late October 1968. She remained at Yokosuka for the rest of the year.

=== Riverine operations, 1969 ===
Underway again for South Vietnam on 6 January 1969, Vernon County encountered engineering difficulties en route to her initial destination, Naha. Reaching Okinawa on 10 January, she offloaded her cargo – 54 tons of cargo and 303 tons of vehicles – before departing for Subic Bay for four days of upkeep and repair work on her engineering spaces. By 17 January 1969, the problem was corrected, thus permitting her to get underway and proceed for her ultimate destination, South Vietnam.

Lifting cargo that proved to be about the smallest in the history of the vessel—one man and two tons of LCPL equipment – Vernon County disembarked her passenger and unloaded the equipment upon arrival at Vũng Tàu. Shifting to the Mekong Delta region soon thereafter, Vernon County embarked 360 troops and support units and relieved USS Whitfield County as support ship for Task Force 117, a mobile riverine force, with which she deployed from 17 January 1969 to 24 March 1969. Once again, she served as a floating warehouse for ammunition, fuel, and other support materiel; a mooring point for river patrol craft; and a helipad for the detachment of four helicopters.

The most noteworthy events of the deployment occurred in Vernon County's direct contact with the enemy. During the latter part of February 1969 and early days of March 1969, Vernon County took two near-misses from People's Army of Vietnam (PAVN) mortar batteries located on the south bank of the Song Mỹ Tho River at about 02:30 hours on 22 February 1969. One landed approximately 25 metres (27 yards) off the starboard side near an ammunition pontoon; the other landed some 25 metres (27 yards) off the port quarter. A large rocket missed the ship, landing harmlessly 200 yards (180 meters) away. Vernon County manned her battle stations and returned the fire with 46 rounds of 3-inch (76.2-millimeter) gunfire.

On 23 February 1969, PAVN/VC automatic weapons fire came in the direction of Vernon County, most rounds concentrated on one of the pontoons alongside or at the bridge. On 25 February 1969, lookouts spotted a swimmer 50 yards (46 meters) from the stern; grenades from M79 grenade launchers were soon directed at him, thoroughly saturating the area. A body was sighted soon thereafter, the grenades apparently having done their work.

On 26 February 1969, Vernon County came in for further attention from VC sappers. A deck sentry sighted a dark object floating in the water near the fantail and fired two M16 rifle rounds, quickly resulting in a violent thrashing about in the water below. Shortly thereafter, the target, probably a sapper, sank.

Closely related to Vernon County's activities was a recoilless rifle attack on the Philippine tug Kangaroo, 500 yards (460 meters) downriver from Vernon County. Kangaroo sustained serious damage, and fires broke out on board; Vernon County's rescue and assistance team boarded the crippled tug and promptly extinguished the fires, performing temporary repairs on Kangaroo's damaged superstructure as well. The action on the part of Vernon County, described as "quick and professional", resulted in 27 letters of commendation and a Bronze Star for the ship's sailors who participated in the salvage operation.

Relieved on station by USS Windham County on 24 March 1969, Vernon County sailed for Yokosuka, via Penang, Malaysia; Da Nang; Subic Bay; and Okinawa. She reached Yokosuka on 22 April 1969 and subsequently remained in port there for slightly more than a month.

=== Operations in Japan and South Korea, 1969 ===
After conducting refresher trials in company with USS Tom Green County, Vernon County sailed to South Korea, where she loaded a World War II-vintage PT boat hull on 5 June 1969 for eventual transfer to a museum in the United States. She began her return voyage to Yokosuka on 6 June 1969.

=== Transportation operations in South Vietnam, 1969 ===
Vernon County began her next line tour in South Vietnam on 5 July 1969, this time transiting to South Vietnam in company with tank landing ship USS Westchester County. Arriving on 13 July 1969, Vernon County loaded A Company, 3rd Motor Transport Battalion, 3rd Marine Division – 264 Marines, five naval enlisted men, 10 officers, 49 vehicles, and 44 tons of miscellaneous equipment – and departed Da Nang on the evening of 13 July 1969. On 18 July 1969, Vernon County and Westchester County arrived at Kin Red, Okinawa, and discharged their cargoes and disembarked their passengers.

Although Vernon County was slated to return to South Vietnamese waters, engineering casualties diverted her to Subic Bay for repairs. From Subic Bay, she was ordered, upon completion of repairs, to join AEG Bravo, operating off the I Corps zone in the northern part of South Vietnam.

Vernon County carried out training activities in the days that ensued, lifting 185 field troops from E Company, 2nd Battalion, 26th Marines, from Chu Lai to Da Nang. Debarking the Marines on 10 August 1969, Vernon County loaded cargo that day for shipment to Okinawa. Although initially slated to depart on 10 August 1969, the loss of the ship's stern anchor forced a delay of one full day. She ultimately accomplished the cargo lift, however, reaching White Beach, Okinawa, on 16 August 1969.

=== Operations at Okinawa, Taiwan, and Japan, 1969 ===
Vernon County participated in exercises over the succeeding days before proceeding to sea at 23:00 on 19 August 1969 to evade Typhoon Cora. Subsequently, she proceeded to Taiwan for rest and recreation at the port of Keelung.

With the end of the Taiwan stay, she put to sea again to return to Yokosuka. En route, she rescued three Taiwanese fishermen early on the evening of 29 August 1969 northeast of Taiwan. The fishermen, who had been adrift for a week, were returned later that evening to a ship of the Nationalist Chinese Navy.

Vernon County operated between Okinawa and Japan through mid-October 1969.

=== Transportation and Operation Market Time operations, 1969–1970 ===
In mid-October 1969, Vernion County returned to South Vietnamese waters, sailing to Da Nang in company with tank landing ships USS Washoe County, Westchester County, and Tom Green County. Reaching Da Nang on 4 November 1969, Vernon County embarked 147 Marines of the Headquarters and Service Company, 9th Motor Transport Battalion, 53 vehicles, and 58 tons of equipment. The lift, designated Operation Keystone Cardinal, was scheduled to terminate at Kin Red, Okinawa. En route, however, heavy seas held progress to a virtual standstill while three days out of Da Nang. Vernon County suffered storm damage – two perpendicular cracks began to develop on opposite sides of her mast, directly below the radar platform. Diverted to Subic Bay, she effected repairs there before proceeding on and ultimately unloading her cargo at Kin Red on 17 November 1969.

Vernon County returned to South Vietnam soon thereafter, initially to Vũng Tàu, where she took on a load of ammunition to be delivered to tank landing ship supporting Task Force 115's riverine operations. From Vũng Tàu, Vernon County proceeded to the vicinity of the Cà Mau Peninsula and there relieved USS Terrell County on station as part of Operation Market Time, which kept Vernon County on station for eight weeks. Operating slightly to the north of Square Bay and Point de Daniau, she remained at anchor 90 percent of the time, about 5,000 yards (4,600 meters) from shore. During that time, she acted as a floating landing pad for support helicopters; provided goods and services to small craft operating on the coastal interdiction and patrol functions of the Market Time operation; assumed the role of naval gunfire support ship; and established the central communications point for Task Group 115.7. Vernon County performed all of her duties well, servicing and rearming helicopter gunships, providing supplies to her frequent customers – PCF's and PGM (motor gunboats) – and providing fire support.

Relieved by Washoe County on 21 January 1970, Vernon County sailed first to Hong Kong, and from there to the Philippines, the latter in connection with the first leg of the lift known as Operation Keystone Bluejay. Provisioning at Subic Bay, Vernon County returned to South Vietnamese waters on 19 February, embarking men and equipment of Marine Aircraft Group 12, Marine Air Base Support Squadron (MABS) 12, and Marine Air Tactical Control Unit (MAC TU) 62 shortly after her arrival.

Departing Chu Lai in company with Westchester County, Vernon County sailed to Iwakuni, Japan, reaching Iwakuni ahead of schedule on 27 February 1970. The two ships then sailed for Yokosuka, arriving soon thereafter.

=== Operations in Japan and South Korea, 1970 ===
Vernon County subsequently sailed to South Korean waters, participating in Operation Golden Dragon – a joint Republic of Korea Navy-United States Navy operation – before returning to Japanese waters and the port of Sasebo. She operated between Japan and Okinawa into the summer of 1970. During one of her in-port periods, the ship received a visit from Admiral Elmo Zumwalt, Jr., the Chief of Naval Operations, on 16 May 1970.

=== Operation Market Time, 1970 ===
Following an availability and refresher training, Vernon County departed Yokosuka in company with gunboat USS Crockett. She was diverted to Subic Bay to meet an additional two gunboats to escort to Vietnamese waters. Necessary upkeep items, however, could only be completed by Vernon County and gunboat USS Welch, which then proceeded to sea as scheduled to resume the transit to Cam Ranh Bay. Once within South Vietnamese waters on 29 September 1970, Welch proceeded independently, leaving Vernon County to proceed to Vũng Tàu to relieve Westchester County as Operation Market Time support LST.

Her responsibilities and activities generally similar to those of previous Market Time deployments, Vernon County remained on station supporting Task Force 115 until 5 November 1970. Then, after a period of time at Hong Kong, she returned to Japan, reaching Yokosuka on 21 December 1970.

== Operations at Diego Garcia, 1971 ==
Vernon County began 1971 in dry dock number one at Yokosuka, Japan, at the naval ship repair facility. During the first few weeks of 1971, Vernon County took on a decidedly different appearance, because, instead of the standard U.S. Navy haze gray, Vernon County had been painted white overall in preparation for her next – and perhaps most interesting – deployment. During the week of 7 February 1971, the final preparations were made for Vernon County to become, by necessity, totally self-sufficient, far from the U.S. Navy's logistic, maintenance, and support areas. After taking on part of the necessary stores and equipment, she sailed for Okinawa to pick up the rest before proceeding on her way, bound for remote Diego Garcia, in the Chagos Archipelago in the British Indian Ocean Territory, with an interim stop at Singapore.

Vernon County ultimately reached Diego Garcia shortly after 17:00 hours on 9 March 1971 and, on 10 March 1971, began underwater reconnaissance and beach surveys. On 11 March 1971, the first formal construction of a United States Navy communication station on Diego Garcia began, which was to forge another link in the globe-girdling system of transmitting and receiving stations. On 12 March 1971, Vernon County became the first LST in history to beach on largely unexplored Diego Garcia, offloading much of her heavy equipment to prepare a staging site for the reception of the many tons of supplies and equipment needed to build the station.

As the days passed, the atoll began to change; the ship rode higher in the water as equipment was unloaded. Temperatures on deck averaged 122 degrees Fahrenheit (50 degrees Celsius) between 10:00 and 15:00 hours each day; "tropical" duty hours of 0400 to 1400 soon commenced aboard the ship. The men of Underwater Demolition Team 12 and a platoon of Seabees removed underwater obstacles, installed buoys, marked anchorages, cleared land, set up a tent city, and began laying down an airfield. By the time dock landing ship USS Monticello (LSD-35) and amphibious cargo ship USS Charleston (LKA-113) arrived, the base camp was fully ready, as was a harbor. Later, having established a self-sustaining shore party, Vernon County made two additional voyages to and from Diego Garcia, picking up more men and supplies at Singapore, Cocos Island, and Mauritius.

During the last few days of her deployment to Diego Garcia, Vernon County was repainted her standard haze gray, a sure sign that the time had come for the ship to sail away from the atoll upon which she had established a base camp and the beginnings of a communication station.

== Transportation operations, 1971 ==
Vernon County returned to the Philippines via Australia and transferred military vehicles from the Sangley Point Naval Air Station (which was being turned over to the Philippine government) to Okinawa in early June 1971. She ultimately returned to her home port, Yokosuka, on the afternoon of 19 June 1971.

== Return to Vietnam War service ==
=== Operation Market Time, 1971 ===
Vernon County conducted another tour of duty in South Vietnamese waters in the summer of 1971, again performing the duties of Operation Market Time support ship, a job that entailed her staying close to shore and serving as a landing platform for helicopters, a haven for patrol boats, and a supplier of food, fuel, water, lodging, and ammunition for both helicopters and patrol craft. Turning over those duties to landing ship tank Windham County on 6 September 1971, Vernon County remained on patrol off the coast of South Vietnam on another phase of Market Time support, turning over those duties to tank landing ship Washtenaw County on 19 October 1971 before proceeding to Bangkok, Thailand, for rest and recreation.

=== Thailand, 1971 ===
Departing Bangkok on 27 October 1971 for Hong Kong, Vernon County spotted a Thai fishing boat in distress on 28 October 1971. Several of Vernon County's engineers boarded the boat and diagnosed the problem as an electrical failure in the engine. After completing repairs to the fishing craft's engine, Vernon County's men received a present of four boxes of fresh crabs and squid in grateful appreciation of the services they rendered. Happy possessors of a picture of Vernon County and cigarettes given in return by Vernon County, the fishing craft sailed off. "We might have been forgiven for being proud of our role as Good Samaritans", the ship's cruise book recorded. "In any case, the crabs were delicious."

=== Vietnam and Far Eastern operations, 1971–1972 ===
Vernon County ultimately spent the remainder of her active naval career in the Far East, returning twice more to South Vietnamese waters and serving once more as Operation Market Time support LST. She visited the familiar ports of Subic Bay, Hong Kong; Vũng Tàu; Kuching, Malaysia; and Singapore, among others. She also served another tour with the Amphibious Ready Force in the Gulf of Tonkin in early October 1972.

=== Awards ===
Vernon County earned a Presidential Unit Citation (for her actions between 28 February 1969 to 25 March 1969), three Meritorious Unit Commendations, three Navy Unit Commendations, and 13 campaign stars for her Vietnam War service.

== Decommissioning and transfer to Venezuela ==
Decommissioned on 14 June 1973 at Yokosuka, Japan, Vernon County was transferred to the Venezuelan Navy on 29 June 1973 on loan. Assigned the name Amazonas (T-21) in Venezuelan service, she was permanently transferred, via cash sale, to Venezuela on 1 December 1977. She was simultaneously struck from the Navy List.

Amazonas ran aground on 6 August 1980, but was repaired and returned to Venezuelan Navy service.
