= USS Pitkin County =

1945 LST-542-class tank landing ship

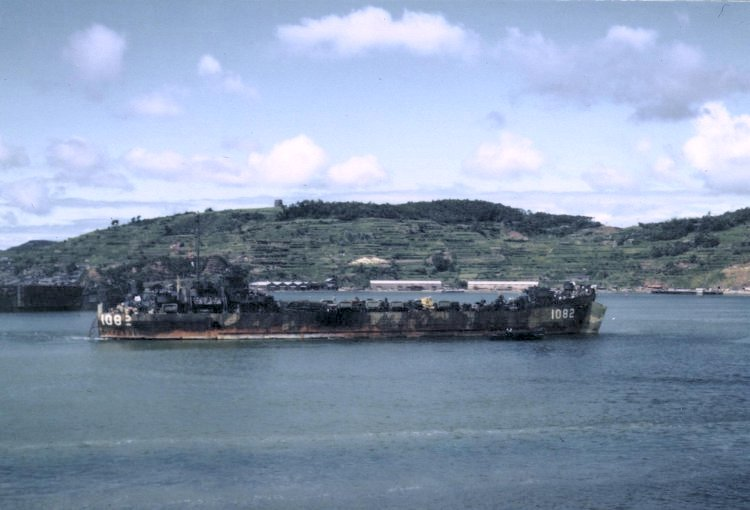
- LST-1082, with pontoons lashed to her side, at anchor opposite a small fishing village near Sasebo, Japan, 23 September 1945

History

United States
- Name: USS LST-1082
- Builder: American Bridge Company, Ambridge, Pennsylvania
- Laid down: 18 November 1944
- Launched: 26 January 1945
- Commissioned: 7 February 1945
- Decommissioned: 5 August 1946
- Recommissioned: 6 September 1950
- Decommissioned: 1 September 1955
- Renamed: USS Pitkin County (LST-1082), 1 July 1955
- Recommissioned: 9 July 1966
- Decommissioned: 1 September 1971
- Stricken: 1 April 1975
- Identification: IMO number: 7629908
- Honors and awards: 1 battle star (World War II); 4 battle stars (Korea); 10 campaign stars (Vietnam)
- Fate: Sold, 19 December 1975; Scrapped, 1988

General characteristics
- Class & type: LST-542-class tank landing ship
- Displacement: 1,625 long tons (1,651 t) light; 4,080 long tons (4,145 t) full
- Length: 328 ft (100 m)
- Beam: 50 ft (15 m)
- Draft: Unloaded : 2 ft 4 in (0.71 m) forward; 7 ft 6 in (2.29 m) aft; Loaded : 8 ft 2 in (2.49 m) forward; 14 ft 1 in (4.29 m) aft
- Propulsion: 2 × General Motors 12-567 diesel engines, two shafts, twin rudders
- Speed: 12 knots (22 km/h; 14 mph)
- Boats & landing craft carried: 2 × LCVPs
- Troops: 16 officers, 147 enlisted men
- Complement: 7 officers and 204 enlisted men
- Armament: 8 × 40 mm guns; 4 × 20 mm guns

USS Pitkin County (LST-1082) was an LST-542-class tank landing ship built for the United States Navy during World War II. Named after Pitkin County, Colorado, she was the only U.S. Naval Vessel to bear the name.

Originally laid down as LST-1082 on 18 November 1944 by the American Bridge Company of Ambridge, Pennsylvania. The ship was launched on 26 January 1945, sponsored by Mrs. Stephen Anzio; departed Ambridge on 26 January 1945 under a ferry crew which piloted her down the Ohio and Mississippi Rivers to the U.S. Naval Repair Base, Algiers, Louisiana; and commissioned at New Orleans on 7 February 1945.

== World War II, 1945–1946 ==
After shakedown to St. Andrews Bay, Florida, and alterations at Mobile, the new tank landing ship loaded pontoon barges at Gulfport, Mississippi, and departed on 24 March 1945 with 90 Navy passengers who were disembarked in the Panama Canal Zone. From there she proceeded to Pearl Harbor where she embarked marines bound for Guam, and sailed on 27 April entering Apra Harbor on 17 May. LST–1082 departed Guam two days later and proceeded via Saipan for Okinawa. After weathering a typhoon on 5 June, she arrived Buckner Bay, Okinawa on 8 June and lay hidden under a smoke screen with her crew at general quarters during the many air alerts. LST–1082 departed Naha, Okinawa, on 4 July, to return marines and their combat gear to Guam. She then returned via Saipan to Pearl Harbor on 5 August.

She was in floating drydock number 2, when news came of the end of hostilities with Japan on 15 August. Fourteen days later she stood out of Pearl Harbor with 210 Marines and their equipment bound for occupation duty in Japan, and reached Sasebo on 23 September. LST–1082 departed Sasebo two days later for Subic Bay, Luzon, Philippine Islands, where she embarked elements of the Fifth Air Force. Following a brief stay in Lingayen Gulf, she departed San Fabian on 12 October to land the Army troops and their equipment at Wakayama, Japan arriving on 22 October. She sailed the following day for Manila, thence proceeded to the San Fabian Beach in Lingayen Gulf. There she embarked 185 officers and men of an Army aviation battalion and debarked these occupation troops in Sasebo, Japan, on 15 November.

LST–1082 departed Sasebo on 23 November and steamed home via Saipan, and Pearl Harbor arriving at San Francisco on 16 January 1946. LST–1082 decommissioned at Astoria, Oregon, on 5 August 1946, and entered the Pacific Reserve Fleet.

== Korean War, 1950–1955 ==
The LST remained in reserve until recommissioned at Astoria on 6 September 1950. She fitted out in the Puget Sound Naval Shipyard, trained out of San Diego, and sailed on 19 December for Japan via Pearl Harbor and Midway Island. LST–1082 arrived in Yokosuka on 23 January 1951 to begin support of United Nations Forces in Korea. She departed on 8 February with units of LST Division 13 bound to Urusan Wan, Korea. Here, she received vehicles and men of a United States Engineering Special Brigade for transport to Pusan, arriving on 13 February 1951. That afternoon she was outbound with American and Korean Army troops, and 387 South Korean laborers. These passengers and their equipment were debarked at Inchon on 15 February. The following weeks, she transported thousands of prisoners-of-war from Inchon to Koje Do Island for internment. LST–1082 left Koje Do Island on 20 March for Kobe, Japan. Following repairs, she touched at Sasebo en route to Okinawa thence steamed to Kunsan, Korea to transfer combat cargo to shore from the attack cargo ship Andromeda (AKA-15). She returned to Okinawa on 4 May and sailed two days later with passengers and freight for Inchon. She put into Sasebo Harbor on 13 May 1951, for tactical exercises off the coast of Japan before departing from Yokosuka for home on 7 June. LST–1082 arrived at San Diego from the Far East on 28 June for amphibious assault tactics and exercises before she returned to the Far East reaching Yokosuka on 7 April. She sailed for shuttle duty at Pusan, Korea, transferring Communist Chinese prisoners-of-war to Koje Do Island.

Returning to Yokosuka on 6 July, LST–1082 carried out amphibious assault training with Army field artillery troops along the coast of Japan before transporting them to Pusan. She entered Pusan Harbor on 10 August to land vehicles and Army troops. She again called at Pusan, 20 to 23 September, transporting 105 prisoners-of-war in a shuttle trip to Koje Do Island. She spent the following weeks among ports of Japan and in Fleet exercises stretching along the coast of Korea to P’ohang Do. She departed Yokosuka on 22 November and returned to San Diego on 20 December.

She trained along the Southern California coast and was overhauled in the Mare Island Naval Shipyard until sailing on 19 October 1953 for the Far East. She touched at Pearl Harbor, then stopped briefly on 10 November to launch and recover a landing force at Taka Atoll in the Marshall Islands and arrived at Yokosuka on 23 November 1953. She spent much of the next eight months in Marine amphibious assault landing exercises that took her from the shores of Japan to the beaches of Okinawa, Iwo Jima, and Inchon. She departed from Yokosuka on 17 June 1954 and returned to San Diego on 19 July.

Named USS Pitkin County (LST-1082) on 1 July 1955, she operated on the West Coast until she decommissioned at San Diego on 1 September 1955 and entered the Pacific Reserve Fleet.

== Vietnam War, 1966–1971 ==
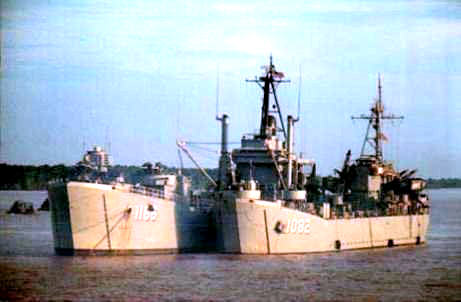
Pitkin County (LST-1082) alongside the larger Terrebonne Parish-class LST Washtenaw County, date and location unknown.

Pitkin County recommissioned at Long Beach Naval Shipyard on 9 July 1966. The same day she became flagship for Landing Ship Squadron 3. After training through the summer, she sailed for South Vietnam and arrived Da Nang on 29 November. After debarking Marines, she began shuttle operations between Da Nang and Chu Lai until sailing for Guam on 21 December, arriving at Apra Harbor on 2 January 1967. On 26 January she got underway for a survey cruise taking her to the Marianas, Volcano Islands, Bonins, and Ryukyus. Arriving at Okinawa on 7 February, she loaded supplies and vehicles and sailed on the 10th for Chu Lai, arriving on the 14th. After unloading, she sailed via Da Nang for Hong Kong.

For the next three years, operating out of Guam, she alternated service in Vietnam, largely for Operation Market Time operations with visits to other Far Eastern ports. On Christmas Eve she sped to assist the merchant tug Makah ablaze in Vũng Tàu Harbor, and extinguished the fires saving the stricken and abandoned ship.

== Decommissioning and sale ==
Pitkin County was decommissioned on 1 September 1971, and struck from the Naval Vessel Register on 1 April 1975 and transferred to the Defense Reutilization and Marketing Service (DRMS) for disposal. Pitkin County was sold for scrapping by DRMS on 19 December 1975.

However, she was then sold to Max Rouse & Sons, Beverly Hills, California, and taken in hand by Marine Industries, Tacoma, Washington for conversion for commercial use. She was then sold on to Landing System Technology Pte. Ltd, Singapore in 1975 and renamed LST-4. She arrived at Piraeus, Greece having been acquired by Maritime & Commercial Co. Argonaftis S.A., Panama (Greek flag) and was renamed Petrola 144, on 6 June 1978. She arrived at the ship breakers at Gadani Beach, Pakistan for demolition, on 16 April 1988.

== Awards ==
LST-1082 earned one battle star for World War II, four battle stars for the Korean War, and as Pitkin County ten campaign stars for the Vietnam War.

== See also ==
- List of United States Navy LSTs
