= Harry L. Glucksman =

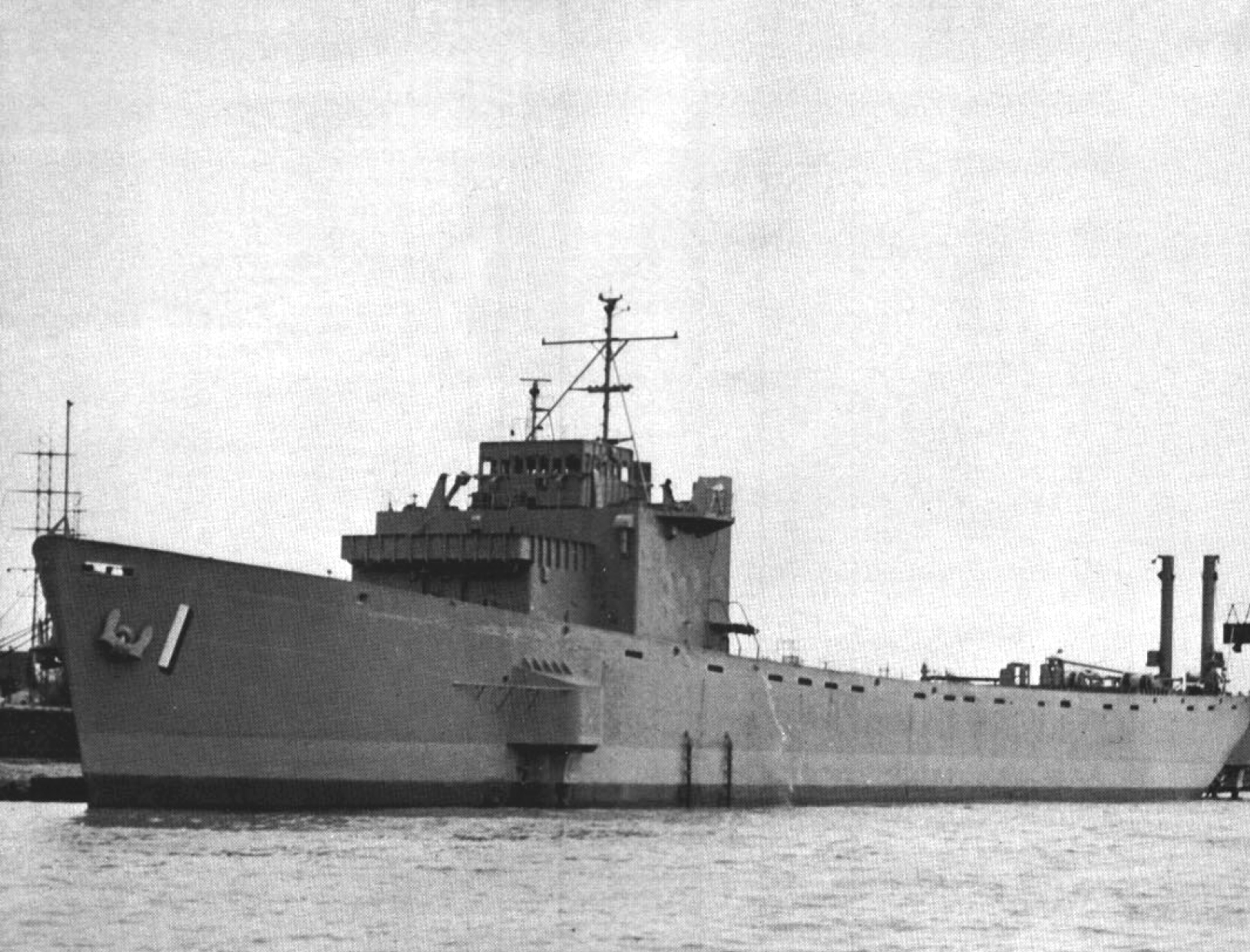
- Minesweeper, Special MSS-1 pierside at American Shipbuilding, Lorraine, Ohio in April 1969.

History

United States
- Name: Harry L. Glucksman; MSS-1
- Builder: Southeastern Shipbuilding Corporation, Savannah, Georgia
- Laid down: 18 March 1944
- Launched: 29 April 1944
- Acquired: 1966
- In service: (WSA/MARAD) 20 May 1944–23 August 1966; (Navy) 16 June 1969
- Out of service: (Navy) 15 March 1973
- Fate: Sold for scrap, 9 September 1975
- Notes: U.S. Official Number 245528

General characteristics Harry L. Glucksman
- Type: EC2-S-C1
- Tonnage: 7,198 GRT; 10,488 DWT
- Length: 422 ft 8 in (128.8 m)
- Beam: 57 ft (17.4 m)
- Decks: 2
- Propulsion: Triple expansion steam

General characteristics Navy MSS-1
- Displacement: 4,023 long tons (4,088 t) light; 11,565 long tons (11,751 t) full load
- Length: 441 ft 6 in (134.57 m)
- Beam: 56 ft 11 in (17.35 m)
- Draft: 28 ft 4 in (8.64 m)
- Propulsion: Five outboard deck-mounted diesels with Murrat-Tregurtha Harbormaster outdrives
- Speed: 10 knots (19 km/h; 12 mph)
- Complement: 1 officer and 8 enlisted men
- Armament: None
- Aviation facilities: Helicopter flight deck, one spot

Harry L. Glucksman was a 7,198 GRT Liberty ship (MC type EC2-S-C1) built by the Southeastern Shipbuilding Corporation of Savannah, Georgia, launched on 29 April 1944, delivered to the War Shipping Administration 20 May 1944, and sailing in convoy from New York to the United Kingdom on 10 June. The ship was laid up 29 May 1948 with two withdrawals from reserve 20 November 1951 – 9 June 1952 and 29 November 1956 – 31 March 1958, the second withdrawal for transporting coal to Europe. The ship remained in reserve until transferred permanently to the United States Navy which completely gutted the ship in a conversion to become a "device," (Note: Official classification as a "device" rather than "ship" accounts for absence of listings among the Navy's ships.) designated Minesweeper, Special, MSS-1, for the Atlantic Fleet Mine Force research and development project intended to develop an unsinkable hull equipped with magnetic coils to increase its magnetic signature for the detonation of magnetic mines and using its hull pressure to detonate pressure mines. MSS-1 was placed out of service 15 March 1973 and returned to the Maritime Administration (MARAD) for disposal on 2 September 1975.

== Construction and wartime service ==
Harry L. Glucksman was a 7,198 GRT Liberty ship (MC type EC2-S-C1) laid down on 18 March 1944 under a Maritime Commission contract (MC hull MCE 2445) by the Southeastern Shipbuilding Corporation af Savannah, Georgia and launched on 29 April 1944. The ship was delivered to the War Shipping Administration (WSA) on 20 May 1944 and operated by Merchants and Miners Transportation Company as the WSA agent until 1 November 1946 when the ship was operated by Isthmian Steamship Company under bareboat charter. Records show that only weeks after delivery to WSA on 20 May 1944 Harry L. Glucksman joined Convoy number HXM 295 that sailed from Halifax and later from New York on 10 June arriving United Kingdom on 26 June.

== Intermittent commercial service & layups ==
The ship was taken over by Dichman Wright and Pugh on 6 May 1948 and laid up in the reserve fleet at Wilmington, North Carolina on 29 May. The ship briefly came out of reserve 20 November 1951 – 9 June 1952 for operation by United States Navigation Company under a Military Sea Transportation Service charter before again being laid up at Wilmington. Another period of activity was from 29 November 1956 – 17 March 1958 with American Coal Shipping, Inc., under bareboat charter for transporting coal to Europe until delivered to Arrow Steamship at Norfolk, Virginia for deactivation and then lay up in the James River Reserve Fleet on 31 March.

== Transfer to Navy ==
On 23 August 1966 the ship was transferred to the United States Navy to be converted into a Minesweeper, Special by American Shipbuilding of Lorain, Ohio. The ship's hull was completely gutted and a shock-hardened pilot house was fitted. Intended to sweep influence mines by detonating them with pressure wave or magnetic signature generated by her hull. In late summer of 1969, the ship underwent extensive shock testing off Key West, Florida.

=== Minesweeper, Special MSS-1 ===
The ex-Harry L. Glucksman was placed in service as an Atlantic Fleet Mine Force research and development project, officially a "device" for testing, and designated Minesweeper, Special, MSS-1. The "device," arriving at Charleston, South Carolina in August 1969, was intended to test the feasibility of using an "unsinkable" ship to produce by its own hull and special magnetic coils ringing the main deck the magnetic and pressure signature of a larger ship. MSS-1, displacing nearly 15,000 tons, was filled with about 140,000 cubic feet (3,964.4 m^{3}) of styrofoam and all compartments below the waterline were flooded for ballast. Propulsion was by five inboard/outboard diesel engines to minimize risk of loss of propulsion from explosions. The pilot house was shock mounted and special padded, shock mounted chairs were provided for the officer in charge and eight enlisted crew. The shock tests took place in the Gulf of Mexico and by October 1970 eight such tests had taken place as the MSS-1 developed from a complete unknown to an operationally tested platform. The original officer in charge, Lieutenant Eugene N. Cate, received the Meritorious Unit Commendation for the crew and several members received individual awards.

=== Out of service and disposal ===
MSS-1 was removed from service 15 March 1973 and returned to the Maritime Administration (MARAD) for disposal on 2 September 1975 and delivered to Luria Brothers and Company for scrapping the same day. The former Harry L. Glucksman was scrapped in 1975 at Brownsville, Texas.

== Bibliography ==
- Gravat, Johy J. (1971). "Minesweeper Special 'The World's Largest Outboard'" (PDF). All Hands (April). Washington: Bureau of Naval Personnel: 56–57. Archived from the original (PDF) on September 13, 2015.
- Lloyds. "Lloyd's Register 1945–46" (PDF). Lloyd's Register (through PlimsollShipData).
- Maritime Administration. "Harry L. Glucksman". Ship History Database Vessel Status Card. U.S. Department of Transportation, Maritime Administration. Archived from the original on March 4, 2016.
- "Convoy number HXM295 from Halifax (later New York) to UK. Sailing on 10 6 1944 and..." Records of the Admiralty. The National Archives (UK), Kew.
- NavSource. "Harry L. Glucksman (MSS 1)". NavSource.
- Naval History And Heritage Command. "Glossary of Abbreviations and Terms". Naval History And Heritage Command.

== See also ==
- USS Washtenaw County (LST-1166)
- List of mine warfare vessels of the United States Navy
