= USS Tom Green County =

US naval vessel (1953–1972)

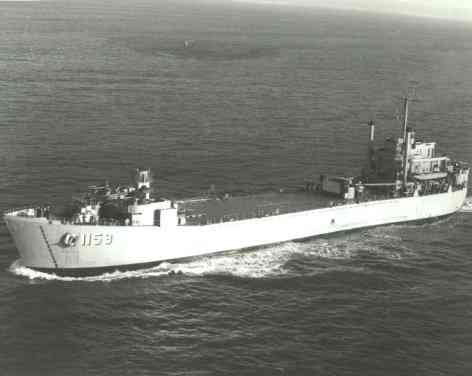
- LST-1159 at sea, circa September 1953.

History

United States
- Name: USS Tom Green County (LST-1159)
- Namesake: Tom Green County, Texas
- Builder: Bath Iron Works, Bath, Maine
- Laid down: 2 September 1952
- Launched: 2 July 1953
- Commissioned: 12 September 1953
- Decommissioned: 5 January 1972
- Fate: Transferred to Spain, 5 January 1972
- Stricken: 1 November 1976
- Honors and awards: 12 engagement stars, two Navy Unit Commendations, and one Meritorious Unit Commendation for her Vietnam War service

Spain
- Name: Conde de Venadito (L-13)
- Namesake: Juan Ruiz de Apodaca, 1st Count of Venadito
- Acquired: 5 January 1972
- Stricken: 1990

General characteristics
- Class & type: Terrebonne Parish-class tank landing ship
- Displacement: 2,590 tons (light), 5,800 tons (full)
- Length: 384 ft 0 in (117.04 m)
- Beam: 55 ft 0 in (16.76 m)
- Draft: 17 ft 0 in (5.18 m)
- Propulsion: Four General Motors 16-278A diesel engines, two controllable pitch propellers
- Speed: 14 knots (26 km/h; 16 mph)
- Boats & landing craft carried: Three LCVPs, one LCPL
- Troops: 15 officers and 380 enlisted men
- Complement: 16 officers and 189 enlisted men
- Armament: Three twin 3"/50 gun mounts, five single 20 mm gun mounts

USS Tom Green County (LST-1159) was a Terrebonne Parish-class tank landing ship built for the United States Navy at the tail end of the Korean War. Named for Tom Green County, Texas, she is the only U.S. Naval vessel to have borne that name. She was subsequently transferred to Spain, where she served in the Spanish Navy as Conde de Venadito (L-13).

== Operational history ==
=== Pacific ===
Designed under project SCB 9A and laid down as LST-1159, the ship was launched on 2 July 1953; sponsored by Mrs. R. T. Cowdrey; and commissioned on 12 September 1953.

Initially attached to Amphibious Forces, Atlantic Fleet, LST-1159 conducted shakedown in Guantánamo Bay and the Caribbean before commencing local operations out of Norfolk and Little Creek, Virginia. She departed Norfolk on 24 February 1954 for duty with Amphibious Forces, Pacific Fleet, and, after a transit of the Panama Canal, reached the west coast on 20 March. The tank landing ship operated out of her new home port, San Diego, until 20 September, including calls at San Francisco, San Pedro, Los Angeles, and Esquimalt, British Columbia. LST-1159 stopped briefly at Pearl Harbor before proceeding on toward Japan. While on the voyage across the Pacific, the ship was diverted to join Task Force (TF) 98 in Southeast Asian waters and arrived at Henriette Pass, near the port of Haiphong, French Indochina on 29 October. Taking part in "Operation Passage to Freedom", LST-1159 transported refugees from the northern part of what became a divided Vietnam, to the southern ports of Tourane (Da Nang) and Saigon.

On 29 November 1954, her job in the massive humanitarian effort completed, the tank landing ship proceeded toward her original destination via Subic Bay, Philippine Islands and Hong Kong, British Crown Colony, and arrived at Yokosuka, Japan on 22 December. The tank landing ship paid calls on the Japanese ports of Moji, Sasebo, and Kobe before a deteriorating international situation resulted in the ship's call to duty with TF 76 at Buckner Bay, Okinawa on 3 February 1955. She sortied from Okinawa soon thereafter and took part in the evacuation of the Tachen Islands from 8 to 13 February, moving 2,144 civilians, 1,100 troops, 600 tons of ammunition, and 37 vehicles to Formosa in two round trips. Soon after completing these operations, LST-1159 was named USS Tom Green County (LST-1159).

Returning via Sasebo and Inchon, Korea to the United States, Tom Green County made port at San Diego on 2 April to begin a period of local operations out of that port. On 14 October the tank landing ship entered the Mare Island Naval Shipyard at Vallejo, California for four months. Moving back to San Diego following the overhaul, Tom Green County departed the west coast for her second Far East deployment on 24 April and arrived at Pearl Harbor on 4 May. Underway on 7 May, the ship made port at Yokosuka on the 24th and operated in the Far East for the remainder of 1956, touching at her normal ports of call, such as Sasebo, Iwakuni, Nagasaki, and Yokosuka, Japan; Buckner Bay and Naha, Okinawa; as well as Hong Kong and Iwo Jima, before returning to Yokosuka on 22 November. On 23 January 1957 the tank landing ship departed Japanese waters for Hawaii and reached Pearl Harbor on 9 February.

Tom Green County conducted local operations between the Hawaiian Islands and the west coast for the remainder of the year, with calls at San Diego, Monterey, Oakland, San Francisco, and Camp Pendleton, before she headed for Pearl Harbor. Deployed again to the Far East, Tom Green County made port at Yokosuka on 4 July 1958 to commence amphibious support exercises and training cruises to familiar places: Buckner Bay, Naha, Subic Bay, and a new port on the itinerary, the Nationalist Chinese base at Kaohsiung, Taiwan. She remained engaged in these activities through the fall of 1958, before returning, via Pearl Harbor, to San Diego to round out the year. Local operations between the west coast and Pearl Harbor occupied the ship through 1959. In July 1960 new orders dictated the tank landing ship's change of home port from San Diego to Yokosuka and assigned Tom Green County as flagship of Landing Ship Division 92. She continued her operations much as before, but maintenance work was now conducted in Japanese yards, obviating returns to United States for overhauls. Local operations, interspersed yard periods, and training exercises kept the tank landing ship engaged through 1962.

=== Cuban Missile Crisis ===
Following the ship's participation in Operations "Tulungan" (9 March to 9 April 1962) and "Lone Eagle" (14 to 23 October), at Subic Bay and Okinawa, respectively, Tom Green County went on alert as the presence of Russian ICBMs in Cuba brought on a confrontation between the Soviet Union and the United States. Ready for any eventuality, the Navy prepared itself, worldwide. Tom Green County sailed for Naha on 24 October, moored at the LST ramp, and took on board Marines and their equipment. After the crisis passed, the ship returned to her normal operating schedule, making for Iwakuni on the 27th to offload, before proceeding to Yokosuka. Upkeep from 2 to 25 November at Yokosuka preceded the ship's type-training exercises through 29 November. Tom Green County paid a port visit at Beppu, Japan, from 1 to 3 December before returning to her home port on the 7th. Underway three days later, the ship made for Numazu, Japan to load Marines and material for transport to Okinawa and arrived on the 15th. The tank landing ship off-loaded, headed for Japanese waters, and arrived at Yokosuka on 19 December before getting underway again on Christmas Eve for Tokyo. Tom Green County departed the Japanese capital city on the 28th and returned to Yokosuka, where she spent the remainder of the year in upkeep status. The following year saw more of the same activities in store for the tank landing ship. Port visits to Tsoying, Taiwan (12 to 14 March 1963); Hong Kong (16 to 22 March); Osaka, Japan (8 to 15 April); and Taipei, were interspersed with local operations out of Yokosuka. Tom Green County participated in Operations "Flagpole" (16 to 28 June) and "Bayonet Beach" (31 August to 9 September) along the eastern coast of South Korea, transporting embarked Marines and vehicles to landing beaches and putting them ashore. Following her return to Japanese home waters with a visit to Kagoshima from 9 to 15 November, the ship proceeded to Sasebo for three weeks of upkeep. Conducting type training in Buckner Bay, she on-loaded Marines for transport to Numazu and subsequently arrived home at Yokosuka on 20 December.

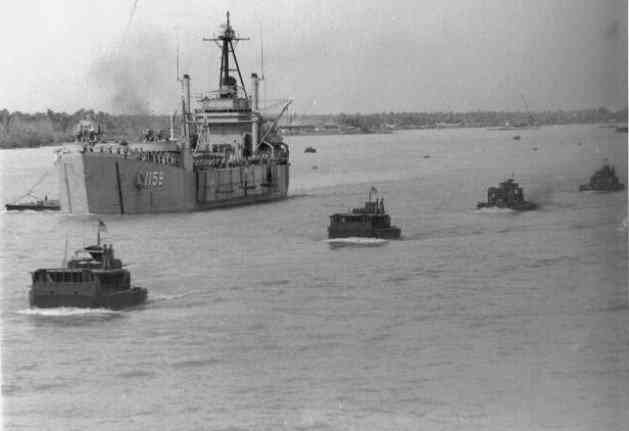
USS Tom Green County (LST-1159) operating in the Mekong River, circa 1968.

=== Vietnam War ===
As the situation in Southeast Asia worsened, the United States began to take a more active part in the Vietnam War. Operation Jungle Drum, towards the end of 1965, landed Marines in southern Thailand. With increasing American commitments in South Vietnam, Tom Green County participated in Operations Piranha and Double Eagle in January and February 1966. The latter was the first large-scale amphibious landing under combat conditions since Inchon. In June 1966 the ship came under the operational and administrative command of Landing Ship Squadron 9; and, in November, the ship commenced support commitments for the Vietnam Coastal Surveillance Force, engaged in monitoring and interdicting offshore small craft traffic, TF 115. The year 1967 found the ship participating in further combat operations: Operation Beacon Torch, Operation Beaver Track, Operation Bear Chain, and Operation Kangaroo Kick. As an element of Amphibious Ready Group Bravo (TG 76.5), Tom Green County received the Meritorious Unit Commendation for these operations conducted between 18 June and 4 August 1967. During this deployment in Southeast Asia, the ship also underwent a yard overhaul at Yokosuka from 16 August to 17 November before she returned to Vietnamese waters. On 22 March 1968 Tom Green County arrived in the Mekong Delta region to commence a deployment as support LST for the Mobile Riverine Assault Force. On 15 April Viet Cong (VC) insurgents attacked the ship with recoilless-rifle and automatic-weapons fire, taking nine hits in quick succession. Following repairs, the ship resumed operations with Amphibious Ready Group Alpha (TG 76.4) and participated in Operation Swift Pursuit, before returning to the Mekong in December to commence resupply duties for TG 117.2—Mobile Riverine Group Bravo. While en route on 28 December, Tom Green County came under rocket fire from VC gunners and took seven hits on her port side.

Repairing the damage and continuing her assigned missions, she conducted her operations in the Bassac River near Cần Thơ. On 21 January 1969, while beached at Vũng Tàu and loading supplies for a routine convoy run, the ship again came under fire as VC launched a rocket barrage directed at the loading ramp and the adjacent airstrip. One rocket (122 millimeter) impacted on the fantail and exploded in the mess decks of Tom Green County, inflicting heavy materiel damage and wounding several men in the after part of the ship. Retracting and anchoring at Vũng Tàu Bay, Tom Green County effected temporary repairs before being relieved by the USS Whitfield County to sail for Yokosuka and permanent repairs. On 2 February the ship made port at Yokosuka to commence a long repair period, after which she conducted support operations for an assault boat school at Numazu while undertaking independent steaming exercises. Sudden troop deployments in Vietnam resulted in a recall to Southeast Asian waters, and Tom Green County accordingly sailed for Vũng Tàu on 23 June. En route, the ship trained in riverine warfare tactics. Tom Green County relieved Whitfield County on 4 July 1969 at Mỹ Tho, near Dong Tam Base Camp, and spent the next six weeks supporting the operations of TF 117, as it prepared to "wrap up" its operations in the Mekong Delta region. While at Mỹ Tho and in the Delta, the ship served as a floating supply base and a transient barracks ship for members of the Army 9th Division who were being processed for stateside duty. Tom Green County also fired over 3,000 rounds of 3-inch/50-caliber counter-battery harassment and interdiction fire, while maintaining watch for VC swimmer-sappers who might attempt to mine the ship while she lay at anchor.

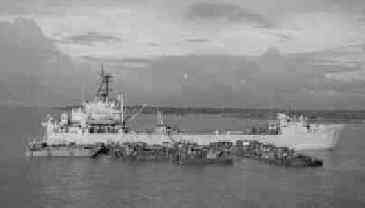
Tom Green County (LST-1159) at anchor in the Mekong River, circa 1968.

On 18 August, the day before the disestablishment of the Mobile Riverine Force, Tom Green County departed Vietnamese waters and steamed for Subic Bay, arriving in the Philippines on the 23rd. Taking on provisions after arriving, the tank landing ship proceeded for Keelung, Taiwan on the 23rd, making port four days later. Underway for the Marianas on 2 September, the ship stopped briefly at Guam before pressing on with a Micronesian cruise, calling at Koror, Babelthuap, and Yap, before returning to Guam and subsequent operations transporting men and materiel to Yokosuka. On 25 October, with the ship's dependents on board, Tom Green County cruised from Yokosuka to Tokyo, unloading the dependents upon arrival and on-loading a 5-ton, 135-foot totem pole from Alaska, to transport it to Expo '70 at Osaka. "Operation Totem Pole" proceeded to completion on 27 October when the ship docked at Kobe and unloaded her unusual cargo. After a one-night liberty, Tom Green County joined the USS Vernon County, USS Washoe County and USS Westchester County in support of Operation Keystone Lift from Da Nang, where they made port on 5 November. Four and one-half hours later, the ship got underway for Kin Red, Okinawa with elements of the 3rd Battalion, 12th Marines, embarked; and arrived at her destination on the 11th, unloaded and disembarked the troops; and headed back toward Yokosuka. En route, however, the ship was redirected to Da Nang for another lift, and she took on board a full cargo of railroad rolling stock. Her ship's historian nicknamed Tom Green County the "Ghost Ship of Da Nang" because of her nocturnal loading operation in which she arrived after dark and was gone before the dawn. On the night of the 25th, Tom Green County made port at Okinawa; unloaded in just one and one-half hours; and steamed for Yokosuka, her job completed. Four days later, on the afternoon of 29 November, the ship arrived at her home port in time to spend Thanksgiving of 1969 at "home." Returning to the business of transporting marines soon thereafter, Tom Green County completed one round-trip haul from Okinawa to Numazu before making port at Yokosuka on 13 December for a year-end leave and upkeep period.

For the next two years, Tom Green County remained in the Far East serving as she had done since she was first homeported at Yokosuka. Late in 1971, she was ordered home to the United States and her home port changed to San Diego. The ship departed Japanese waters on 27 October and made port at Pearl Harbor on 12 November for a seven-day stay before beginning the last leg of her voyage to the west coast. Upon her arrival at San Diego on 28 November, she soon commenced preinactivation preparations; and, on 23 December, she cruised in San Diego harbor, commencing the training of the new Spanish crew slated to take over the ship. On 5 January 1972 Tom Green County was decommissioned and transferred to Spain. Renamed Conde de Venadito (L-13), she served the Spanish Navy through 1989. Struck from the Spanish Naval list in 1990, her final fate is unknown.
