= Belorussia-class cargo ship =

Class of cargo ship

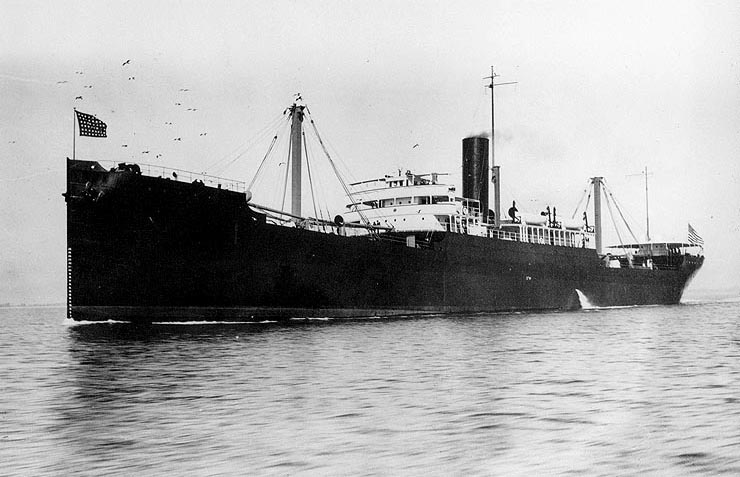
A typical Design 1013 ship under way in 1919

Belorussia-class cargo ships were a Soviet Union class of 25 cargo ships which were built on the West Coast of the United States as per Design 1013 ship and as per Lend-Lease Agreement purchased by USSR in 1942–1945 years, during World War II, as the USSR needed ships of the merchant fleet during World War II and in the first years after this war. Sometimes this class of the ships in USSR marked as West-class cargo ships due to all ships were built on the West Coast of US.

== List of Belorussia-class cargo ships, design 1013 ==
Original name / Year of build (delivery date) / Shipyard in US	Ship's particulars	Ship's names and history
West Modus; February or April 1919 "Northwest Steel Company"; Portland, Oregon	BRT = 5690; GT = 6020; DW = 8677 mt LBP = 124.91 m Beam = 16.52 m Draft = 8.44 m ME - boiler & turbine HP = 2332; Speed = 12.0 kt, later 9.5 kn	West Modus (1919–1942), US flag. The ship was built by "Northwest Steel Company", Portland, Oregon and delivered to United States Maritime Commission in February or April, 1919. Newspaper "The New York Times" wrote on 8 November 1919: "RESCUES 611 PASSENGERS.; American Ship West Modus Also Saves British Steamer's Crew." Argun (Russian: Аргунь), Soviet Union flag. As per Lend-Lease Agreement the ship was adopted by the Soviet procurement commission on 20 November 1942. The ship was renamed Аргунь and included in the Far Eastern State Sea Shipping company (it was renamed Far Eastern Shipping Company later). Following armament was installed on the ship by Soviet militarу in 1942: 1 × 102 mm, 4 × 12.7 mm machine guns. During the World War II the ship was used as one of the paramilitary ships of the Far Eastern Basin, the ship carried out export-import shipments between the Pacific ports of the USSR and its allies. From May 1943 and until completion of World War II, the ship had the following armament: 1 × 102 mm, 1 × 76.2 mm, 8 × 12.7 mm machine guns. The ship was transferred to the balance of the Black Sea State Shipping Company (later Black Sea Shipping Company) on 12 April 1951. Steamer Аргунь was decommissioned, excluded from the vessels' lists of Minmorflot of the USSR on 11 April 1962 and handed over to "Glavvtorchermet" (Main organization for the Second use of Black Metals, - Mainsecondblackmet) for dismantling and cutting into metal.
Culberson; October 1920 "Los Angeles Shipbuilding & Dry Dock Corporation"; Los Angeles, California	BRT = 5453; LBP = 124.97 m Beam = 16.58 m Draft = 7.32 m ME - boiler & machinery HP = 3500; Speed = 10.5 kn	Culberson (October 1920 – 1938), US flag. The ship was built by "Los Angeles Shipbuilding & Dry Dock Corporation", Los Angeles, California. She was laid on in 1919 and delivered in October 1920. Mormacmar (1938 – 20.03.1945), US flag. Belinskiy (Russian: Белинский) (20.03.1945 – 27.08.1945), Soviet Union flag. As per Lend-Lease Agreement the ship was adopted by the Soviet procurement commission on 3 March 1945. The ship was renamed Белинский and included in the Far Eastern State Sea Shipping company (it was renamed Far Eastern Shipping Company later). During the World War II the ship carried out export-import shipments between the Pacific ports of the USSR and its allies. From 9 August to 27 August 1945, the ship was part of the Soviet Pacific Navy as a transport vessel. On 27 August 1945, the ship was excluded from the list of ships of the Narkomat of Marine Fleet in connection with the return to the US due to unsatisfactory technical condition. Scrapped in 1946 Mormacmar (27.08.1945 – 1946), US flag. Due to the ship returned to the US, the ship again received previous name Mormacmar. Scrapped in 1946.
West Hosokie; August 1918 "Skinner & Eddy Corporation"; Seattle, Washington	BRT = 5561; LBP = 124.85 m Beam = 15.91 m Draft = 8.26 m ME - boiler & turbine HP = 2500; Speed = 10.5 kn	West Hosokie (1918–1929), US flag. The ship was built by "Skinner & Eddy Corporation", Seattle, Washington and delivered to owner in August 1918. Constance Chandler (1929–1938), US flag. Liloa (1938 – 13.01.1045), US flag. Belorussia (Russian: Белоруссия), Soviet Union flag. As per Lend-Lease Agreement the ship was adopted by the Soviet procurement commission on 13 January 1945. The ship was renamed Белоруссия and included in the Far Eastern State Sea Shipping company (it was renamed Far Eastern Shipping Company later). Scrapped in 1968. Read more about ship's history in the article SS West Hosokie.
West Celeron; June 1919 "Northwest Steel Company"; Portland, Oregon	BRT = 5763; LBP = 124.91 m Beam = 16.52 m Draft = 8.44 m ME - boiler & turbine HP = 2332; Speed = 9.5 kn	West Celeron (June 1919 – 1942), US flag. The ship was built by "Northwest Steel Company", Portland, Oregon, and delivered to owner in June 1919. In June 1940, the United States Maritime Commission (USMC) opened bidding for the reconditioning of ten laid up cargo ships, which included West Celeron. (Note: Total ten laid up ships selected for reconditioning were Waukegan, West Honaker, Deer Lodge, West Celeron, West Corum, Vincent, Siletz, West Cheswald, Mount Evans, and West Segovia. (See ref #8)) Vostok (Russian: Восток), Soviet Union flag. As per Lend-Lease Agreement the ship was adopted by the Soviet procurement commission on 20 November 1942. The ship was renamed Восток and included in the Far Eastern State Sea Shipping company (it was renamed Far Eastern Shipping Company later).
Siletz; 1919 Columbia River Shipbuilding Company; Portland, Oregon	BRT = 6069; LBP = 129.24 m Beam = 16.46 m Draft = 7.29 m ME - boiler & turbine HP = 2500; Speed = 9.5 / 8.4 kn	Silets (West Hasoon), US flag. The ship was built in 1919 by "Columbia River Shipbuilding Corporation", Portland, Oregon, US. But from beginning, but he the name during laid on was Hasson West (West Hasoon). In June 1940, the United States Maritime Commission (USMC) opened bidding for the reconditioning of ten laid up cargo ships, which included Siletz. Vtoraya Paytiletka (Russian: Вторая Пятилетка)б Soviet Union flag. As per Lend-Lease Agreement the ship was adopted by the Soviet procurement commission on 19 December 1942. The ship was renamed Вторая Пятилетка and included in the Far Eastern State Sea Shipping company (it was renamed Far Eastern Shipping Company later). During the World War II the ship was used as one of the paramilitary ships of the Far Eastern Basin, the ship carried out export-import shipments between the Pacific ports of the USSR and its allies. The ship was transferred to the balance of the Black Sea State Shipping Company (later Black Sea Shipping Company) on 6 February 1946. Steamer Вторая Пятилетка was decommissioned, excluded from the vessels' lists of Minmorflot of the USSR on 23 March 1967 and handed over to "Glavvtorchermet" (Main organization for the Second Use of Black Metals, - Mainsecondblackmet) for dismantling and cutting into metal.
West Cajoot; 1919 "Los Angeles Shipbuilding & Dry Dock Corporation"; Los Angeles, California	BRT = 5504; LBP = 125.12 m Beam = 16.55 m Draft = 8.44 m ME - boiler & machinery HP = 2332; Economic speed = 10.0 kn	West Cajoot (1919–1928), US flag. The ship was built by "Los Angeles Shipbuilding & Dry Dock Corporation", Los Angeles, California and was delivered to the US Shipping Board in 1919. Golden Bear (1928–1937), US flag. Kailua (1937 – 06.11.1942), US flag. Vyborg (Russian: Выборг) (06.11.1942 – 22.12.1948), Soviet Union flag. As per Lend-Lease Agreement the ship was adopted by the Soviet procurement commission on 6 November 1942. The ship was renamed Выборг and included in the Far Eastern State Sea Shipping company (it was renamed Far Eastern Shipping Company later). During the World War II the ship was used as one of the paramilitary ships of the Far Eastern Basin, the ship carried out export-import shipments between the Pacific ports of the USSR and its allies. The steamer was lost in Nagaev Bay due explosion of dangerous cargo on 19 December 1947, and excluded from the vessels' lists of Minmorflot of the USSR on 22 December 1948.
West Camargo; July 1920 "Western Pipe and Steel Company"; San Francisco, Northern California	BRT = 5804; LBP = 125.13 m Beam = 16.52 m Draft = 8.32 m ME - boiler & machinery HP = Speed = 10.0 kn	Desna (Russian: Десна), Soviet Union flag. As per Lend-Lease Agreement the ship was adopted by the Soviet procurement commission on 24 December 1942. The ship was renamed Десна and included in the Far Eastern State Sea Shipping company (it was renamed Far Eastern Shipping Company later). During the World War II the ship was used as one of the paramilitary ships of the Far Eastern Basin, the ship carried out export-import shipments between the Pacific ports of the USSR and its allies.
West Helix; May 1919 "J. F. Duthie & Company"; Seattle, Washington	BRT = 5651 (GT = 5670); DW = 8527; LBP = 124.88 m Beam = 16.53 m Draft = 8.44 m ME - boiler & machinery HP = Speed = 10.0 kn	West Helix (1919–1927), US flag. The ship was built by "J. F. Duthie & Company", Seattle, Washington and was delivered to the US Shipping Board in May 1919. Pacific Hemlock (1927–1937), US flag. The ship was taken by an American shipping company. Vermont (1937–1945), US flag. The ship was taken by another American shipping company. From 1939 to 1 February 1945, the ship was managed by "Pacific Atlantic Steamship Co." and owner was "California Eastern Line Inc."". This ship was included in Arctic convoy JW 51B, total was 15 cargo ships in this convoy, which was sent from United Kingdom by the Western Allies to aid the Soviet Union during World War II. It sailed in late December 1942, reaching the Soviet northern ports in early January 1943. This convoy arrived at Murmansk without loss of cargo ships, though one had been damaged. Izmail (Russian: Измаил), Soviet Union flag. As per Lend-Lease Agreement the ship was adopted by the Soviet procurement commission шт Portland, Oregon, on 1 February 1945. The ship was renamed Измаил and included in the Far Eastern State Sea Shipping company (it was renamed Far Eastern Shipping Company later). During the World War II the ship was used as one of the paramilitary ships of the Far Eastern Basin, the ship carried out export-import shipments between the Pacific ports of the USSR and its allies. As a troop transport this ship was carrying military replenishment and goods in the port of Maoka (Kholmsk) in August 1945, evacuated injured people from the landing area of the troops. The ship was transferred to the balance of the Black Sea State Shipping Company (later Black Sea Shipping Company) on 20 April 1964. The ship 6.09.1965 G. decommissioned and excluded from the vessels' lists of Minmorflot of the USSR on 6 September 1965.
West Cavanal; June 1919 "Southwestern Shipbuilding Company"; San Pedro, California	BRT = 5505; DW = 8500; LBP = 125.12 m Beam = 16.55 m Draft = 7.35 m ME - boiler & machinery HP = 2500; Speed = 10.0 kn	West Cavanal (1919–1923), US flag. The ship was built by "Southwestern Shipbuilding Company", San Pedro, California in June 1919 and was admitted to the US Shipping Board. Edgar Bowling (1923–1927), US flag. Texmar (1927–1945), US flag. From 1939 to 6 February 1945, the ship was under command "Bethlehem Steel Corporation" ("Calmar Steamship Corporation"). Irkutsk ((Russian: Иркутск), Soviet Union flag. As per Lend-Lease Agreement the ship was adopted by the Soviet procurement commission on 6 February 1945. The ship was renamed Иркутск and included in the Far Eastern State Sea Shipping company (it was renamed Far Eastern Shipping Company later). During the World War II the ship was used as one of the paramilitary ships of the Far Eastern Basin, the ship carried out export-import shipments between the Pacific ports of the USSR and its allies. The ship was transferred to the balance of the Black Sea State Shipping Company (later Black Sea Shipping Company) on 9 March 1950. Steamer Вторая Пятилетка was decommissioned, excluded from the vessels' lists of Minmorflot of the USSR on 27 May 1966 and handed over to "Glavvtorchermet" (Main organization for the Second Use of Black Metals, - Mainsecondblackmet) for dismantling and cutting into metal.
Westbrook; 1918 "Columbia River Shipbuilding Corporation"; Portland, Oregon	BRT = 5586.35; DW = 8800; LBP = 125.05 m Beam = 16.53 m Draft = 7.32 m ME - boiler & turbine HP = 2500; Speed = 10.5 / 10.0 kn	Westbrook (1918–1929), US flag. The ship was built by "Columbia River Shipbuilding Corporation", Portland, Oregon in 1918. Wind Rush (1929–1945), US flag. From 1939, the ship was owned by Shepard Steamship Company, US. Kvkaz (Russian: Кавказ), Soviet Union flag. As per Lend-Lease Agreement the ship was adopted by the Soviet procurement commission on 3 February 1945. The ship was renamed Кавказ and included in the Far Eastern State Sea Shipping company (it was renamed Far Eastern Shipping Company later). The following armament was installed on the ship by Soviet militaries: 1 × 102 mm, 1 × 76.2 mm, 8 × 20 mm machine guns. During the World War II the ship was used as one of the paramilitary ships of the Far Eastern Basin, the ship carried out export-import shipments between the Pacific ports of the USSR and its allies. The ship was transferred to the balance of the Black Sea State Shipping Company (later Black Sea Shipping Company) on 11 June 1950. But later this ship was back to Far East Shipping Company. Steamer Кавказ was decommissioned, excluded from the vessels' lists of Minmorflot of the USSR on 27 May 1966 and handed over to "Minrybprom" on 2 March 1955, to use as an industrial and transport floating base. The ship was decommissioned and turned into a floating mast in 1977.
West Harts; August 1919 "Columbia River Shipbuilding Corporation"; Portland, Oregon	BRT = 5538.1; LBP = 124.97 m Beam = 16.52 m Draft = 7.32 m ME - boiler & turbine HP = 2500; Speed = 10.5 kn	West Harts (1919–1929), US flag. The ship was built by "Columbia River Shipbuilding Corporation", Portland, Oregon in August 1919. Texas (1929–1945), US flag. Kapitan Vislobokov (Russian: Капитан Вислобоков) (13.01.1945 – 13.06.1950), Soviet Union flag. As per Lend-Lease Agreement the ship was adopted by the Soviet procurement commission on 13 January 1945. The ship was renamed Капитан Вислобоков and included in the Far Eastern State Sea Shipping company (it was renamed Far Eastern Shipping Company later). During the World War II the ship was used as one of the paramilitary ships of the Far Eastern Basin, the ship carried out export-import shipments between the Pacific ports of the USSR and its allies. The ship was transferred to the balance of the Black Sea State Shipping Company (later Black Sea Shipping Company) on 11 June 1950. Omsk (Russian: Омск) (13.06.1950 – 03.02.1959), Soviet Union flag The ship was renamed Омск от 13 June 1950. Steamer Омск was decommissioned, excluded from the vessels' lists of Minmorflot of the USSR on 3 February 1959 and handed over to "Glavvtorchermet" (Main organization for the Second use of Black Metals, - Mainsecondblackmet) for dismantling and cutting into metal.
Circinus; 1919 "Columbia River Shipbuilding Company"; Portland, Oregon	BRT = 5568.1; LBP = 124.97 m Beam = 16.52 m Draft = 8.38 m ME - boiler & machinery HP = 2328; Speed = 10.0 kn	Circinus (1919–1930), US flag. The ship was built by "Columbia River Shipbuilding Company", Portland, Oregon in 1919. Vermar (1930 – 22.11.1942), US flag. Kamenets-Podolsk (Russian: Каменец-Подольск) (22.11.1942 – April 1944), Soviet Union flag. As per Lend-Lease Agreement the ship was adopted by the Soviet procurement commission on 22 November 1942. The ship was renamed Каменец-Подольск and included in the Far Eastern State Sea Shipping company (it was renamed Far Eastern Shipping Company later). During the World War II the ship was used as one of the paramilitary ships of the Far Eastern Basin, the ship carried out export-import shipments between the Pacific ports of the USSR and its allies. In April 1944, the ship was returned to the US because of unsatisfactory technical condition and in exchange for another steamer. Vermar (April 19441 – 06.02.1945), US flag. The ship was renamed and seems her name was again Vermar Karaganda (Russian: Караганда) (1942–1944), Soviet Union flag. This ship was taken by Soviet Union, "Far Eastern State Sea Shipping company" again, on 6 February 1945, after major repairs in US shipyard. Due to another Soviet ship was named Каменец-Подольск during the repair. It is why the ship was named Караганда. During the World War II the ship was used as one of the paramilitary ships of the Far Eastern Basin, the ship carried out export-import shipments between the Pacific ports of the USSR and its allies. On 24 March 1948, the crew of the ship was awarded the memorial plaque of the Minmorflot for special merits. The ship was transferred to the balance of the Black Sea State Shipping Company (later Black Sea Shipping Company) on 9 March 1950. Steamer Караганда was decommissioned, excluded from the vessels' lists of Minmorflot of the USSR in 1967 and handed over to "Glavvtorchermet" (Main organization for the Second use of Black Metals, - Mainsecondblackmet) for dismantling and cutting into metal.
West Hesseltine; January 1920 "J. F. Duthie & Company"; Seattle, Washington	BRT = 5599; LBP = 124.82 m Beam = 15.52 m Draft = 7.5 m ME - boiler & machinery HP = 2800; Economic Speed = 10.0 kn	West Hesseltine (1920–1930), US flag. The ship was built by "J. F. Duthie & Company", Seattle, Washington in January 1920. From the beginning the ship was under command of U.S. Shipping Board, then was transferred to a U.S. shipping company. Monfiore (1930–1942), Italia flag. The ship was sold to the Italian shipping company in 1930. White Clover (1942–1944), US flag. The ship back to US, under US flag. Lev Tolstoy (Russian: Лев Толстой) (30.04.1945 – 01.03.1948), Soviet Union flag. As per Lend-Lease Agreement the ship was adopted by the Soviet procurement commission on 20 November 1942. The ship was renamed Лев Толстой and included in the Far Eastern State Sea Shipping company (it was renamed Far Eastern Shipping Company later). Following armament was installed on the ship by Soviet militarу during World War II: 1 х 102 мм, 1 х 76.2 мм, 8 х 20 мм machine guns. From 9 August to 3 September 1945, the ship was included in the Soviet Pacific Navy Fleet as a transport ship. On 1 March 1948, The ship was towed by Soviet tanker ship Maikop ((Russian: Майкоп) to Yokohama (Japan) to return to the US due to unsatisfactory technical condition. Monfiore (1948–1956), Italia flag. After the overhaul, the ship was given to the government of Italy and joined the Italian merchant fleet in 1948. Carla Laviosa (1956–1967), Italia flag. The ship changed name to Carla Laviosa in 1956. Scrapped in 1967.
West Bridge; May 1918 "J. F. Duthie & Company"; Seattle, Washington	BRT = 5599; LBP = 124.82 m Beam = 15.52 m Draft = 7.5 m ME - boiler & machinery HP = 2800; Economic Speed = 10.0 kn	West Bridge (1918–1929), US flag. At the beginning of the ship's laying on the slipway she was named War Topaz. The ship was built by "J. F. Duthie & Company", Seattle, Washington in May 1918. Pan Gulf (1929–1938), US flag. Barbara Gates (1929–1938), US flag. Lermontov (Russian: Лермонтов) (30.04.1945 – 01.03.1948), Soviet Union flag. As per Lend-Lease Agreement the ship was adopted by the Soviet procurement commission on 20 November 1942. The ship was renamed Лермонтов and included in the Far Eastern State Sea Shipping company (it was renamed Far Eastern Shipping Company later). Following armament was installed on the ship by Soviet militarу during World War II: 1 х 102 мм, 1 х 76.2 мм, 8 х 20 мм machine guns. From 9 August to 3 September 1945, the ship was included in the Soviet Pacific Navy Fleet as a transport ship. The ship was transferred to the balance of the Black Sea State Shipping Company (later Black Sea Shipping Company) in the end of 1940s. Later steamer Lermontov received IMO number 5520680. Steamer Лермонтов was decommissioned, excluded from the vessels' lists of Minmorflot of the USSR on January 12, 1966, and handed over to "Glavvtorchermet" (Main organization for the Second use of Black Metals, - Mainsecondblackmet) for dismantling and cutting into metal. The ship was scrapped in Split in 1966.
West Wauneke; January 1919 "Long Beach Shipbuilding"; Long Beach, California	BRT = 5735; LBP = 124.91 m Beam = 16.52 m Draft = 8.44 m ME - boiler & machinery HP = 2332; Economic Speed = 10.5 kn	West Wauneke (1919–1929), US flag. The ship was built by "Long Beach Shipbuilding", Long Beach, California in January 1919. Dorothy Cahill (1929–1937), US flag. De Soto (1937–1938). Pan Atlantic (1937 – 06.01.1943), US flag. Luga (Russian: Луга) (06.01.1943 – 25.08.1950), Soviet Union flag. As per Lend-Lease Agreement the ship was adopted by the Soviet procurement commission on 6January 1942. The ship was renamed Луга and included in the Far Eastern State Sea Shipping company (it was renamed Far Eastern Shipping Company later). Following armament was installed on the ship by Soviet militarу during World War II: 1 х 102 мм, 4 х 20 мм, 4 х 12.7 мм machine guns. During the World War II the ship was used as one of the paramilitary ships of the Far Eastern Basin, the ship carried out export-import shipments between the Pacific ports of the USSR and its allies. On 9 September 1948, the ship was thrown by the storm on the rocks near the cape Kril'on, Sakhalin island, and subsequently was broken by wave's surf. Steamer Луга was decommissioned, excluded from the vessels' lists of Minmorflot of the USSR on August 25, 1950, due to impossibility to take out or lift the ship from the rocks.
West Norramus; June 1920 "South Western Shipbuilding Company"; San Pedro, California	BRT = 5435; LBP = 125.12 m Beam = 16.55 m Draft = 8.29 m ME - boiler & machinery HP = 2332; Economic Speed = 10.0 kn	West Norramus (1920–1926), US flag. The ship was built by "South Western Shipbuilding Company", San Pedro, California in June 1920. Pacific Pine (1926–1937), US flag. Maine (1937–1945), US flag. Lvov (Russian: Львов) (06.01.1943 – 13.06.1950), Soviet Union flag. As per Lend-Lease Agreement the ship was adopted by the Soviet procurement commission on 14 February 1945. The ship was renamed Львов and included in the Far Eastern State Sea Shipping company (it was renamed Far Eastern Shipping Company later). During the World War II the ship was used as one of the paramilitary ships of the Far Eastern Basin, the ship carried out export-import shipments between the Pacific ports of the USSR and its allies. The ship was transferred to the balance of the Baltic State Shipping Company (later Baltic Shipping Company) on March 9, 1950. Istra (Russian: Истра) (13.06.1950 – end of 1950s), Soviet Union flag. Renamed Истра on June 13, 1950. Steamer Истра was decommissioned, excluded from the vessels' lists of Minmorflot of the USSR in the end of 1950s and handed over to "Glavvtorchermet" (Main organization for the Second use of Black Metals, - Mainsecondblackmet) for dismantling and cutting into metal.
West Selene; 1919 "Los Angeles Shipbuilding & Dry Dock Company"; Los Angeles, California	BRT = 5940.75; LBP = 129.20 m Beam = 16.46 m Draft = 7.32 m ME - boiler & machinery HP = 3500; Economic Speed = 12.5 kn	West Selene (1919–1938), US flag. The ship was built by "Los Angeles Shipbuilding & Dry Dock Company", Los Angeles, California in 1919. Mormacrio (1938 – 22.03.1945), US flag. Magadan (Russian: Магадан) (22.03.1945 – 29.08.1945), Soviet Union flag. As per Lend-Lease Agreement the ship was adopted by the Soviet procurement commission on 22 March 1945. The ship was renamed Магадан and included in the Far Eastern State Sea Shipping company (it was renamed Far Eastern Shipping Company later). During the World War II the ship was used as one of the paramilitary ships of the Far Eastern Basin, the ship carried out export-import shipments between the Pacific ports of the USSR and its allies. Following armament was installed on the ship by Soviet militarу during World War II: 1 х 102 mm, 4 х 20 mm, 4 х 12.7 mm machine guns. Mormacrio (29.08.1945 – 1947), US flag. The ship was return to the US on 29 August 1945, due to unsatisfactory technical condition.
West Henshaw; 1919 "J.F. Duthie & Co."; Seattle, Washington	BRT = 6062; LBP = 124.87 m Beam = 16.52 m Draft = 7.36 m ME - boiler & machinery HP = 2800; Economic Speed = 10.5 kn	West Henshaw (1919–1928), US flag. The ship was built by "J.F. Duthie & Co.", Seattle, Washington in 1919. Golden Cross (1928–1938), US flag. Kohala (1938 – 02.01.1945), US flag. Petr Chaykovsky (Russian: Пётр Чайковский) (22.03.1945 – 1951), Soviet Union flag. As per Lend-Lease Agreement the ship was adopted by the Soviet procurement commission on 2 January 1945. The ship was renamed Пётр Чайковский and included in the Far Eastern State Sea Shipping company (it was renamed Far Eastern Shipping Company later). During the World War II the ship was used as one of the paramilitary ships of the Far Eastern Basin, the ship carried out export-import shipments between the Pacific ports of the USSR and its allies. Istra (Russian: Истра) (1951–1966), Soviet Union flag. Steamer Истра was excluded from the vessels' lists of Minmorflot of the USSR in the fall of 1966 and handed over to DPR Korea for conversion to a depot ship for acceptance and processing of fish and seafood.
West Hepburn; 1919 "J.F. Duthie & Co."; Seattle, Washington	BRT = 5630; LBP = 124.88 m Beam = 16.52 m Draft = 7.49 m ME - boiler & machinery HP = 2800; Economic Speed = 10.5 kn	West Hepburn (1919–1927), US flag. The ship was built by "J.F. Duthie & Co.", Seattle, Washington in 1919. Charles Christenson (1927 – 05.03.1945), US flag. Plehanov (Russian: Плеханов) (05.03.1945 – 1949), Soviet Union flag. As per Lend-Lease Agreement the ship was adopted by the Soviet procurement commission on 5 March 1945. The ship was renamed Плеханов and included in the Far Eastern State Sea Shipping company (it was renamed Far Eastern Shipping Company later). During World War II the ship was used as one of the paramilitary ships of the Far Eastern Basin; the ship carried out export-import shipments between the Pacific ports of the USSR and its allies. Following armament was installed on the ship by Soviet militaries in 1945: 1 х 102 mm, 5 х 20 mm machine guns. In August 1945, the ship took part in the delivery of human replenishments of military troop and cargo to the port of Maoka (Kholmsk) on Sakhalin island. Professor Lobachevsky (Russian: Профессор Лобачевский) (1949 – 11.02.1956), Soviet Union flag. The ship was transferred to the balance of the Baltic State Shipping Company (later Baltic Shipping Company) on 21September 1949. The ship Плеханов was renamed Профессор Лобачевский in 1949. the ship was back to the Far Eastern State Sea Shipping company on February 11, 1956. Steamer Профессор Лобачевский was decommissioned, excluded from the vessels' lists of Minmorflot of the USSR in the end of 1950s and was turned into a floating warehouse.
West Cressey; 1918 "Skinner & Eddy"; Seattle, Washington	BRT = 5596; LBP = 124.88 m Beam = 16.52 m Draft = 8.23 m ME - boiler & machinery HP = 2500; Economic Speed = 10.0 kn	West Cressey (1918 – 17.12.1942), US flag. The ship was built by "Skinner & Eddy", Seattle, Washington in 1919. Briansk, but today it is written as Bryansk (Russian: Брянск) (17.12.1942 – 1944), Soviet Union flag. As per Lend-Lease Agreement the ship was adopted by the Soviet procurement commission on 17December 1942. The ship was renamed Брянск and included in the Far Eastern State Sea Shipping company (it was renamed Far Eastern Shipping Company later). During the World War II the ship was used as one of the paramilitary ships of the Far Eastern Basin, the ship carried out export-import shipments between the Pacific ports of the USSR and its allies. Following armament was installed on the ship by Soviet militaries during the World War II: 1 х 102 mm, 8 х 20 mm machine guns. In April 1944, the ship was returned to the US because of unsatisfactory technical condition and in exchange for another steamer. Tallin (Russian: Таллин) (1944 – 17.03.1948), Soviet Union flag. As per Lend-Lease Agreement the ship was adopted again by the Soviet procurement commission on 5 November 1944. The ship was renamed Таллин in 1944 and included in the Far Eastern State Sea Shipping company (it was renamed Far Eastern Shipping Company later). During the World War II the ship was used as one of the paramilitary ships of the Far Eastern Basin, the ship carried out export-import shipments between the Pacific ports of the USSR and its allies. The ship was transferred to the balance of the Baltic Sea State Shipping Company (later Baltic Sea Shipping Company) on 11 June 1946. Steamer Таллин run aground on the coastal rocks in Bering Sea, close to Ust-kamchatsk, on 4 September 1946. Due to impossibility to float the ship, she was excluded from the vessels' lists of Minmorflot of the USSR on 17 March 1948.
West Hembrie; 1918 "J.F. Duthie & Co."; Seattle, Washington	BRT = 5622; LBP = 124.88 m Beam = 16.52 m Draft = 8.44 m ME - boiler & machinery HP = 2500; Economic Speed = 10.5 kn	West Hembrie (1918–1929), US flag. The ship was built by "J.F. Duthie & Co.", Seattle, Washington in 1918. Pacific Oak (1929 – 22.03.1943), US flag. Ingul (Russian: Ингул) (22.03.1943 – 10.05.1944), Soviet Union flag.Colton, Tim. "J. F. Duthie & Company, Seattle WA". Shipbuildinghistory.com. The Colton Company. Archived from the original on 2009-12-17. As per Lend-Lease Agreement the ship was adopted by the Soviet procurement commission on 17 March 1943. The ship was renamed Ингул and included in the Far Eastern State Sea Shipping company (it was renamed Far Eastern Shipping Company later). Taras Shevchenko (Russian: Тарас Шевченко) (1945 – 07.03.1963), Soviet Union flag.
West Mingo; 1918 "J.F. Duthie & Co."; Seattle, Washington	BRT = 5940; LBP = 124.96 m Beam = 16.58 m Draft = 8.79 m ME - boiler & machinery HP = 3500; Economic Speed = 10.5 kn	
G.R. Gordon (was commenced on shipyarn as West Joplin); 1919 "Northwest Steel Company"; Portland, Oregon	BRT = 5557; LBP = 124.9 m Beam = 16.52 m Draft = 8.44 m ME - boiler & machinery HP = 2800; Economic Speed = 10.5 kn	
Corvus; 1919 "Columbia River Shipbuilding Company"; Portland, Oregon	BRT = 5551; LBP = 129.16 m Beam = 16.46 m Draft = 7.35 m ME - boiler & machinery HP = 2800; Economic Speed = 10.5 kn	
Westboro; April 1918 "J.F. Duthie & Co."; Seattle, Washington	BRT = 5747; LBP = 124.82 m Beam = 16.52 m Draft = 8.41 m ME - boiler & machinery HP = 2500; Economic Speed = 10.0 kn	

== See also ==
- Design 1013 ship
