= SS Karaganda =

Ship built in 1919

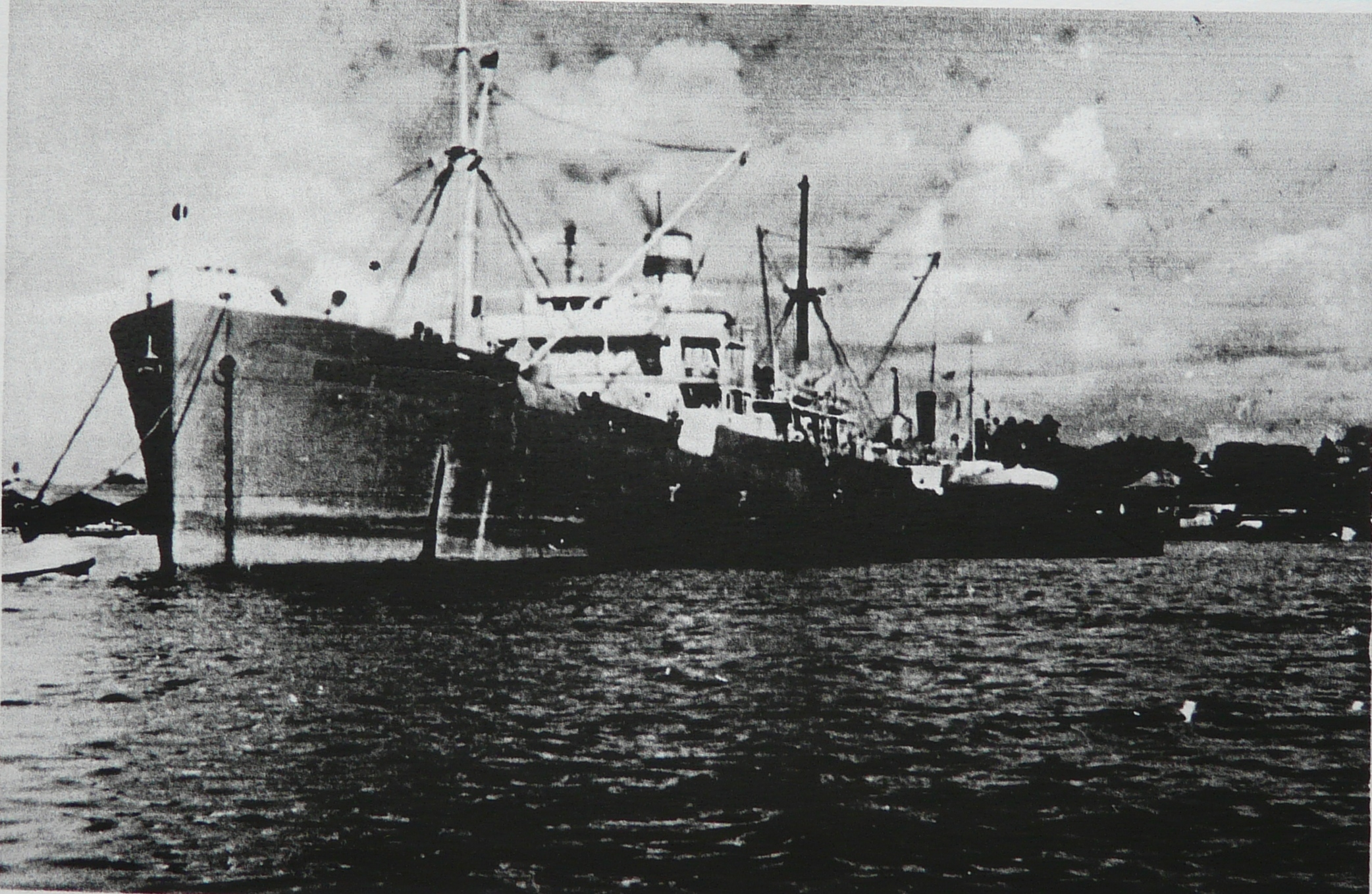
- Soviet steamer Karaganda. Photo dated between 18 March 1961 and 1 October 1963

History
- Name: Karaganda from 6 February 1945 to 1967. (Russian: Караганда); IMO number: 5181861
- Namesake: Circinus (1919–30); Vermar (1930–1942); Kamenets-Podolsk (1942–44)
- Owner: 1919 – 1923: Green Star Line, (United States) US; 1923 – 13 December 1929: Planet Star Corp. (United States) US; 13 December 1929 – 20 November 1942: Calmar Steamship Corp., (United States) US; 20 November 1942 – Apr 1944: Far East Shipping Company, (Soviet Union) USSR.; Apr 1944 – 6 February 1945: Back to US. Repair was carried out.; 6 February 1945 – 9 March 1950: Far East Shipping Company, (Soviet Union) USSR.; 9 March 1950 – 1967: Black Sea Shipping Company, (Soviet Union) USSR.
- Operator: 20 November 1942 – Apr 1944: Far East Shipping Company, (Soviet Union) USSR.; 6 February 1945 – 9 March 1950: Far East Shipping Company, (Soviet Union) USSR.; 9 March 1950 – 1967: Black Sea Shipping Company, (Soviet Union) USSR.
- Port of registry: 20 November 1942 – Apr 1944: Vladivistok, (Soviet Union) USSR.; 6 February 1945 – 9 March 1950: Vladivistok, (Soviet Union) USSR.; 9 March 1950 – 1967: Odessa, (Soviet Union) USSR.
- Builder: Columbia River Shipbuilding Company, Portland, Oregon, (United States) US.
- Launched: Year of built: 1919.
- Renamed: Circinus (1919–1930); Vermar (1930 – 20 November 1942); Kamenets-Podolsk (Russian: Каменец-Подольск) (20 Nov 1942 – Apr 1944); Karaganda (Russian: Караганда) (Apr 1944 – 1967)
- Fate: Scrapped in 1967

General characteristics
- Type: freighter, tweendecker
- Tonnage: GRT 5568.
- Length: 410.0 ft (124.97 m).
- Beam: 54.2 ft (16.52 m).
- Height: 27.5 ft (8.38 m).
- Propulsion: 2328 hrp. Single screw.
- Speed: 10 knots (economic speed).
- Crew: 60 men
- Armament: 1 x 102 mm gun, 4 x 12.7 mm machine guns.

Karaganda (Russian: Караганда) was a merchant steam ship of the Black Sea Shipping Company (Soviet Union) from 9 March 1950 to 1967. This ship was built in the US in 1919, named Circinus and used in some shipping companies of the United States and from 1942 in Soviet shipping companies.

She was a West-class ship as per American shipyards position and Belorussia-class cargo ships as per Russian classification due to one of the West-class cargo ships being named Belorussia when she was purchased by the Soviet Union.

== Ship's particulars. ==
Design 1013 ship. Low free board.

Cargo gear: derricks equipped with steam motors.
Cargo holds: 4 cargo holds and tweendecks.

== US history of this ship ==
This ship was built in 1919 in United States.

=== SS Circinus (1919–1930). ===
During and just after World War I, the Shipping Board's sales campaigns urged Americans to buy ships for wealth and patriotism. Other ethnic groups set up shipping lines by appealing to group solidarity. So, Irish businessmen created the "Green Star Line".

- 18 January 1920. The Sunday Oregonian (Portland) wrote on page 46:

GREEN STAR WILL PLY ATLANTIC

Four Steamers Purchased Here to Sail From Baltimore.
ORIENTAL RUN PROMISED
Cruft Now Being Built at Standifer Plant Expected to Be Operated on Pacific.

Speculation as to the future field of operations of the Green Star Steamship company, which purchased four steel steamers in Portland and placed orders for the construction of five more, was ended last week by a formal announcement from the headquarters of the company in Baltimore, where the Green Star line has purchased a large building to serve as a home for its shipping enterprises. The last of the steamers purchased by, the line here, the Circlnus, sailed from Astoria Wednesday with a full cargo of lumber for Melbourne and Adelaide, Australia. This cargo amounted to 4.086,103 feet, it is reported by Brown & McCabe, stevedores, who had charge of loading the vessel.

- 20 December 1919. The Morning Oregonian in Portland, Oregon, wrote:

"The new steel steamer Circinus of the "Green Star Line" dropped down to St. Helens yesterday and will start loading there Monday. The Circinus has been chartered by J.J. Moore of San Francisco to carry a full cargo of lumber to Australia. She will load at several Columbia river ports. She experienced no trouble beyond a slight checking of her speed in moving through the loose Ice."

- 28 February 1920, Saturday. The Register (Adelaide, SA: 1901 – 1929) wrote in Chapter "Shipping" that the ship Circinus will arrive at Portland, Oregon, on Monday, 2 March 1920.
- 1923 year. In February 1923 five ships of the "Green Star Line" were sold at auction at Baltimore for $735,000, a figure that was considered too low by shipping experts (NYT, 28 February 1923). The "Green Star Line" was not officially reorganized until March 1923. A new corporation the "Planet Star Corp.", brought the remainder of ships owned by the "Green Star Line". In September 1923 an official exchange of securities began, allowing holders of "Green Star Line" stock to trade for stock in the new company (NYT, 8 March and 4 September 1923).
- 21 September 1927. The Prescott Evening Courier wrote:

"Freighter on rocks in So. Pacific.

SAN DIEGO, Sept. 21 – (AP) – Believed to have lost its course in a heavy fog that prevailed last night, the freighter Circinus, en route to San Diego, San Pedro and San Francisco from New York, struck the rocks at Descanso Point, Lower California, 16 miles south of here, according to information received here this morning. The Circinus is a 10,000-ton ship of the Isthmian Line and carries a crew of 60 men. According to the information received here, the ship is resting easily and is in no immediate danger.

Captain Oakley J. Hall of the "Star and Crescent Boat Company" sent a company's tug, Palomar, to the aid of the Circinus and at the same time requested the navy department to dispatch the naval tug Koka to the scene".

- 30 September 1927. The Madera Tribune, Number 126, wrote:

"ROCK PREVENTS SHIP'S SINKING.
(United Press Dispatch)
SAN DIEGO, 30 Sep – A huge bolder which stuck to the hull of the freighter Circinus, when grounded 17 miles south of the border, kept tho ship from sinking, a diver discovered. The freighter was floated Wednesday and brought here.
The rock punctured both bottoms of the vessel. It was embedded firmly". "Calmar Steamship Co." (1927–1976). A subsidiary of "Bethlehem Steel Corp.", serving the intercoastal trade. The company was established by Bethlehem in 1927 to complete with United States Steel's Isthmian Line. Bethlehem had previously operated the "Ore Steamship Corp." as a proprietary operation, but "Calmar" was only "half proprietary", carrying exclusively Bethlehem's steel westbound, but functioning as a common carrier on the return voyage to the East Coast by carrying lumber from a variety of shippers. In addition, "Calmar" collaborated with Moore-McCormack Lines, Inc., in these voyages.

- 13 December 1929. The Oakland Tribune wrote:

Isthmian Lines House Flag from 1910 to 1974.

"CALMAR BUYS SHIPS.

The "Calmar Line" has purchased five freighters from the "Planet Steamship company", according to announcement from New York. This purchase increases the Calmar intercoastal fleet to 11 ships. The new craft are 880 tons register.

The vessels involved are all well known on this coast, consisting of the Circinius, Corvus, Clauseus, Centaurus and Eurana. They have run into local ports for several years under the Isthmian Line houseflag".

The steamer Circinius was renamed Vermar in 1930.

=== SS Vermar (1930–1942) ===
- December 1938. "The Master, Mate and Pilot", number 8, December 1938, mentioned in the article "Calmar Steamship Corp." buys three 10,000-tons Freighters:

"H. W. Warley, vice president of the "Calmar Steamship Corporation", has announced that the concern has purchased three freighters of 10,000 tons deadweight capacity, bringing its intercoastal fleet to 14 ships. The three vessels, the Ehnsport, Colorado Springs, and Edgehill, will enter service as the Kenmar, Marymar, and Oremar, following the nomenclature system now in effect and honoring the states of Kentucky, Maryland, and Oregon.

The expansion program will make possible a new schedule of weekly sailings between ports on the two coasts, Mr. Warley explained. In future, vessels will sail westbound from Baltimore each Saturday and from Philadelphia on Wednesdays, for Los Angeles, San Francisco, Alameda, Oakland, Richmond, Calif, Portland, Seattle, and Tacoma. It is also planned to reduce the transit time to the northernmost ports. The first sailing for the West Coast will be that of the Vermar, leaving Baltimore 7 January and returning from Puget Sound 16 February."

- 1 May 1939. The Eugene Register-Guard wrote:

"Portland Hearings Will be Continued this Wednesday.

PORTLAND, Ore., May 1. (AP) – Labor hitched up its "justiciable controversies" today and prepared to make a fresh assault on Oregon's new union-control law.

At a preliminary hearing on a constitutional test by a group of unions, three circuit court judges decided no "justiciable controversy" had been shown – the union hadn't proved they were hurt.
When the case reaches court again Wednesday, a new suit will be included. A motion picture operator's union ask the right to picked the Circle theater because of contract differences although it constitutes less than a majority of employers and under the law could not picket. Waterfront Mentioned

If that doesn't provide enough force to test the law which was passed last November in the wake of a year-long campaign against labor terrorism, there is the matter of waterfront picketing.

CIO woodworkers from a Carlton lumber mill, on strike because three members of their union were realized, continued to prevent loading of lumber from the mill on the freighter Vermar. Ship agents threatened to invoke the control law on the ground less than half the mill's employees were involved, a stand that ended picketing at the mill last week.

It was indicated the theater suit".

- 5 May 1939. The Spokane Daily Chronicle wrote:

"Restraining Order Blocks Picketing.

PORTLAND, Ore., May 5. (AP) – A temporary restraining order to stop picketing was issued Wednesday in one of Portsland's two labor controversies that have tied up ships and the order was settled when the union accepted a company offer.
The International Woodworkers of America Wednesday accepted an offer from the Engle & Worth Lumber company at Cariton, ending the dispute that prevented the freighter Vermar loading lumber for five days. The firm reinstated two dismissed workers.
Circuit Judge John P. Winter issued the order restraining pickets of the maritime office employees' local, 1–25, from picketing the steamer William Luckenbach.

The union picketed the boat in protest to the company's asserted failure to company with a national labor relations board order to reinstate three workers".

- 6 May 1939. The Capital Journal (Salem, Oregon) wrote on page 12:

"Moody's Report On Good Cases Barred by Court.

Portland, May 6 (AP) – Oregon's union-control law faced a new challenge today in a series of waterfront disputes.

While three circuit judges heard defendant officials answer a labor coalition test of the law's constitutionally, another was added when charges against 21 men indicated for alleged unlawful picketing of the steamer Vermar were shifted to the same court. Accused of having prevented loading of the freighter Vermar with lumber from a Carlton sawmill, the men, mostly members of the Carlton CIO woodworkers' union, were realised from custody after a demurrer to the indictments was filed.

Gus Solomon, CIO attorney who filed the demurrer on the ground that the law was unconstitutional, asked transfer of the case to the judges hearing the test.
The law forbids demonstrations on premises of employers not involved in controversies and in cases where less than majority of workers are concerned. The woodworkers' strike at the Carlton mill was settled but only after loading of the Vermar was delayed three days.

George Cron, who declared the state courts had no jurisdiction and picketed in defiance of the circuit court order, was charged with contempt but released on bond. However longshoremen and CIO sailors pleaded "danger" and refused to board the vessel.
Cron's arrest followed a demonstration be the maritime office workers' union in protesting alleged refusal of the Luckenbach line to heed a national labor relations board order and reinstate three members with back pay.

In the original labor-coalition test of the law, the court acting upon answers filed by defendant city, county and state officials admitted all the evidence with the exception of a report on labor terrorism by special prosecutor Ralph Moody, which is termed a "special pleading by a skilled partisan"."

In the immediate post-World War II period, Calmar purchased eight Liberty ships and modified them for the company's purposes. Seems the ship Vermar was counted as one of these eight Liberty ships, but she was not really Liberty class ships.

== Soviet history of this ship ==
=== SS Каменец-Подольск (1942–1944). ===
- 20 November 1942. Former US cargo ship Vermer was adopted by the Soviet Purchasing Committee, renamed Kamenyets-Podolsk and entered in the Far Eastern State Shipping Company on 20 November 1942.
- April 1944. The ship Kamenyets-Podolsk was returned to the U.S. due to poor technical condition in exchange for another steamer.

=== Ship Караганда in Far East Shipping Company (1945 – March 1950). ===
The ship, ex-Circinus, ex-Vermar, ex-Kamenets-Podolsk, was back after major overhaul to the Far East Shipping Company from the United States on 6 February 1945 and was named Karaganda as another ship Robert S. Abbot (built in 1944), which was Liberty ship and also received from the United States, already was named Kamenets-Podolsk. The ship was named in honor of Karaganda city in Kazakhstan SSR, USSR.

=== Ship Караганда in Black Sea Shipping Company from March 1950 to 1967. ===
This ship was transferred to balans of the Black Sea Shipping Company on 9 March 1950.

Seems this steamer was used for the Line between Soviet Black Sea ports and Indian ports from the 1950s. So, Soviet Union magazine Ogoniok (Russian: Огонёк) number 38, 14 September 1952, wrote:

"To the shores of India.

... Joint Committee was established For the purpose of immediate assistance to the hungry people in the Andhra State. The Committee members belong to different political organizations. The Committee requested the Trade Unions with a request to help the starving in Andhra State.

As reported by our press, Soviet trade unions warmly responded to this request and decided to send food to the starving population of the southern regions of India.

Again "the ships of peace and friendship" go to the shores of India. The ship Karaganda is already in the Red Sea, on the way to India. The wheat was grown Ukrainian farmers and after loaded in the holds. On the eve of the departure from the Soviet Union the crew of Karaganda under command of Captain P. I. Boyko worked tirelessly to prepare the ship for exemplary long voyage through many Seas and the Indian Ocean. The completion of ship's loading was eight hours earlier of schedule. The crew of the ship Karaganda declared own voyage as Stakhanovite movement and dedicated it to the XIX Congress of the party. ... "

==== Collision in May 1957. ====
The ship Karaganda, GRT more than 6000, under command of captain P. I. Boyko, discovered the lights of an oncoming vessel at a distance of 100 meters approximately at 01 hrs 14 min on 1 May 1957, when she was following "slow ahead" in the Black Sea during the fog with visibility up to 50–70 meters. That was the ship Zaporozhye, GRT 2000 approximately, under the command of captain L. M. Preobrazhensky which was coming with speed slow ahead also, 5–6 knots, and on this ship the lights of the ship Karaganda were seen on a distance of approximately 100 m. The command "full speed astern" were given on both ships for 2–3 minutes before collision, but was not possible to snub the ships and Karaganda, having considerable inertia of moving forward, hit the port side board of the ship Zaporozhye by own left foreword quarter and by the left anchor at 01 hours 16 minutes. The Zaporozhye sank rapidly after 28 minutes due to list was increased rapidly to the port side. The Karaganda suffered a lot of damage to the bow part of the hull. Due to correct actions of the captain of the Zaporozhye after the collision, who took all demanded measures setting for the salvation of all 54 crew members as well as the ship's papers and money, the abandonment of the sinking ship was organized without panic and in compliance with good maritime traditions. The watch sailor was risking own life when he hacked the jammed door of the chief mate's cabin and released the chief officer before the sinking vessel. There were no victims after the collision of two ships and the loss of one of them.

Due 1 May was one of the main the Soviet Union celebrations the date of collision was changed to 3 May 1957.

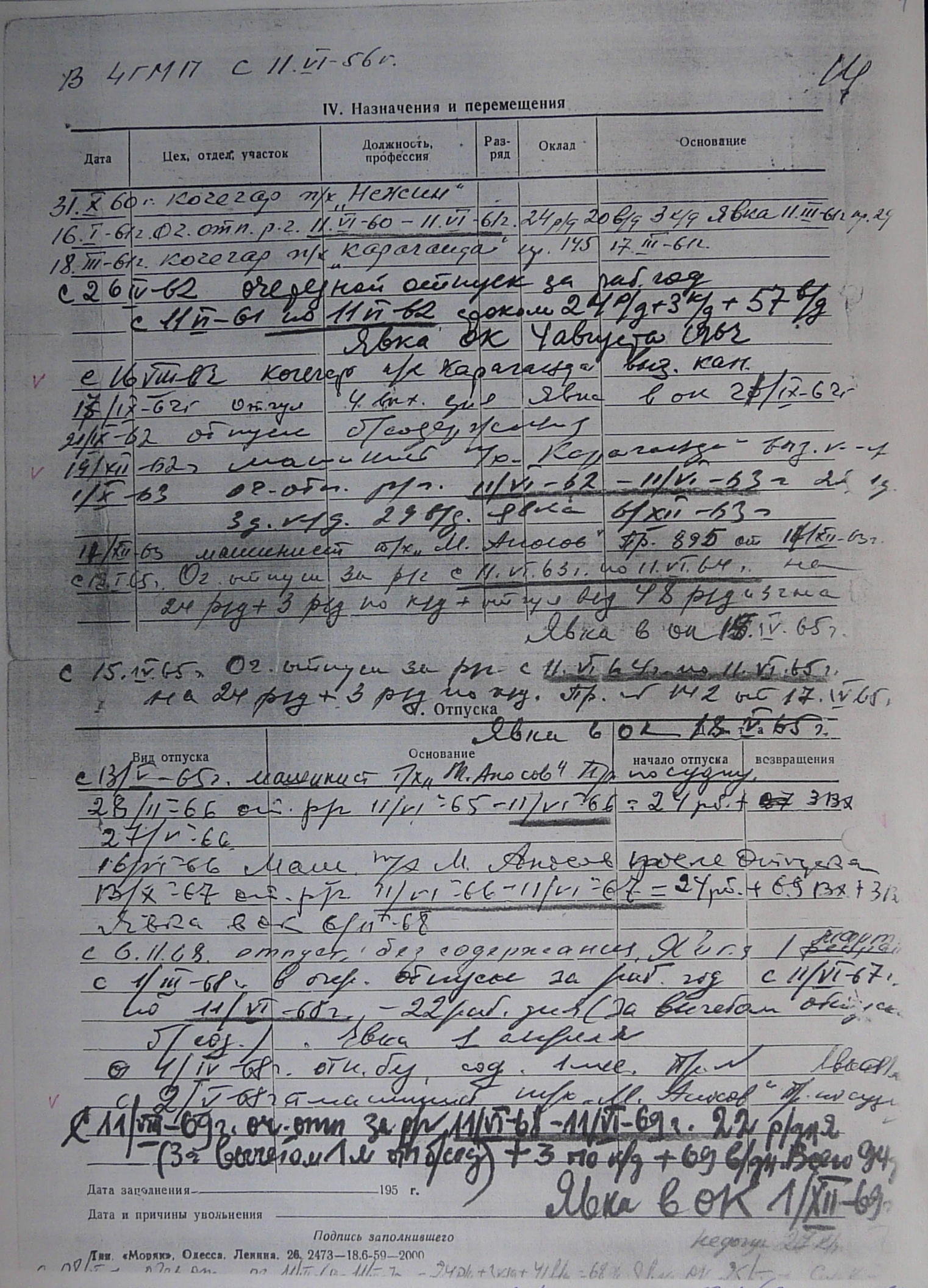
One side of card from the personnel department of Black Sea Shipping Company as confirmation that the person worked on the ships Nezhin, Karaganda, Metallurg Anosov. Only this person worked on these three ships.

After the collision of two Black Sea Shipping Company ships, all big ships of this company were equipped with radar during some years. The short separate mast was added on accommodation for radar installation (to see ship's photo).

==== Newcomer in March 1961. ====
Motorman Nikolay, his previous ship was steamer Nezhin, joined the ship Karaganda on 18 March 1961 and the ship already was equipped with one radar and re-equipped as a motor-ship.

To read article: SS Nezhin

==== The word "Gde" in Odessa language ====
The mix of two official language of part of population named "Soorzhyck" (Russian: "суржик") language in Russia and Ukraine. A person speaking on "Soorzhyk" also named a "soorzhyk". The population of Odessa had good mix of two languages, Ukrainian and Russian, in the 1960s still. Due to Odessa citizens use mix of more than two languages it was impossible to name "Soorzhyk" language. And Odessa citizens did not glad when somebody call them "soorzhyks". They say that Odessa has own language.

Also Odessa citizens use Russian worlds so that other population of the U.S.S.R. smile and sometimes smile wildly. It is depends and questions including the word "Gde" (Russian: "Где").

English question-word "Where" has following translations on Russian:

- Где – in case anybody asking about position.
- Куда – in case anybody asking about direction.

For example:

- Where are you going? – Куда Вы идёте?
- Where are you? – Где Вы?
- Where is it? – Где это?

Odessa citizen can replace the word "Куда" by the word "Где":

- Where are you going? – Где Вы идёте?

It is means that the word "Где" can means and position, and direction in Odessa. And other population of the USSR smile when Odessa somebody say like this. Theremore, Odessa citizens can replace other question-words by the "Где" or directly or changing the phraze:

- How are you? – Как поживаете? (Как Вы себя чувствуете?)

can be changed as

- And, where you have pain? – И где у Вас болит?

==== Gde-Gde? Na Karagande. ====
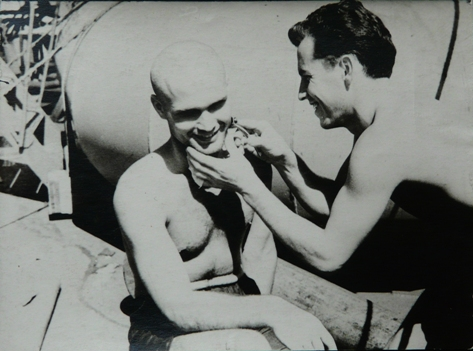
Rest hours on board of Soviet ship Karaganda during the voyage to India. A haircut and having between cargo for India. Photo dated 1961 or 1962.

"Gde-gde ..." (Russian: "Где-где" and on English: "Where, where") – it is an adverb of Russian language. Mostly "gde-gde" means any area or any place where is very bad conditions or conditions more worst then in other mentioned place as per text in the sentence. For example:

- the article "Где, где? В Караганде! – Чрезвычайное происшествие (18+)" (English: "Gde, gde? In Karaganda(-e)! – Emergency incident (18+)");
- examples in any Russian vocabulary.

Karaganda is a city in Kazakhstan that was built during Soviet Union period and is known for coal mining and concentration camps. It is good rhyme: "Gde, gde? V Karagande!" where last character "a" changed to "e" as per Russian grammatical rules.

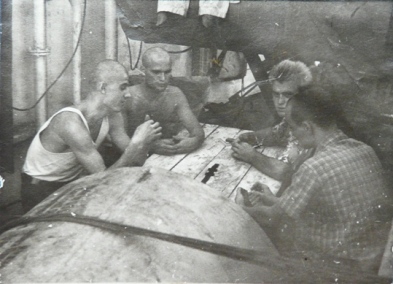
Rest hours on board of Soviet ship Karaganda during the voyage to India. The crew members play dominoes close to lashed cargo for India during rest hours. Photo dated 1961 or 1962.

In case somebody asked any crew member of ship Karaganda:
– "Where are You now?" -
he reply
– "Gde, gde? Na Karagande?" (English: "Where, where? On (board of) Karaganda") – it is means on board of ship Karaganda.

The same reply was from Nikolay to anybody. It is means that conditions on this ship was not very good due to the Karaganda was old and one of the worst ships of Black Sea Shipping company. The Karaganda was re-equipped as motor-ship before outomn 1961. The ship was built on the riveted joints, but the metal sheets of the hull were thick. Cargo derricks were equipped by hydraulic motors. During the engines run the motorman had to check heating of cylinders by hand and was necessary often to add oil.

==== MS Karaganda between May 1961 and autumn 1962 ====
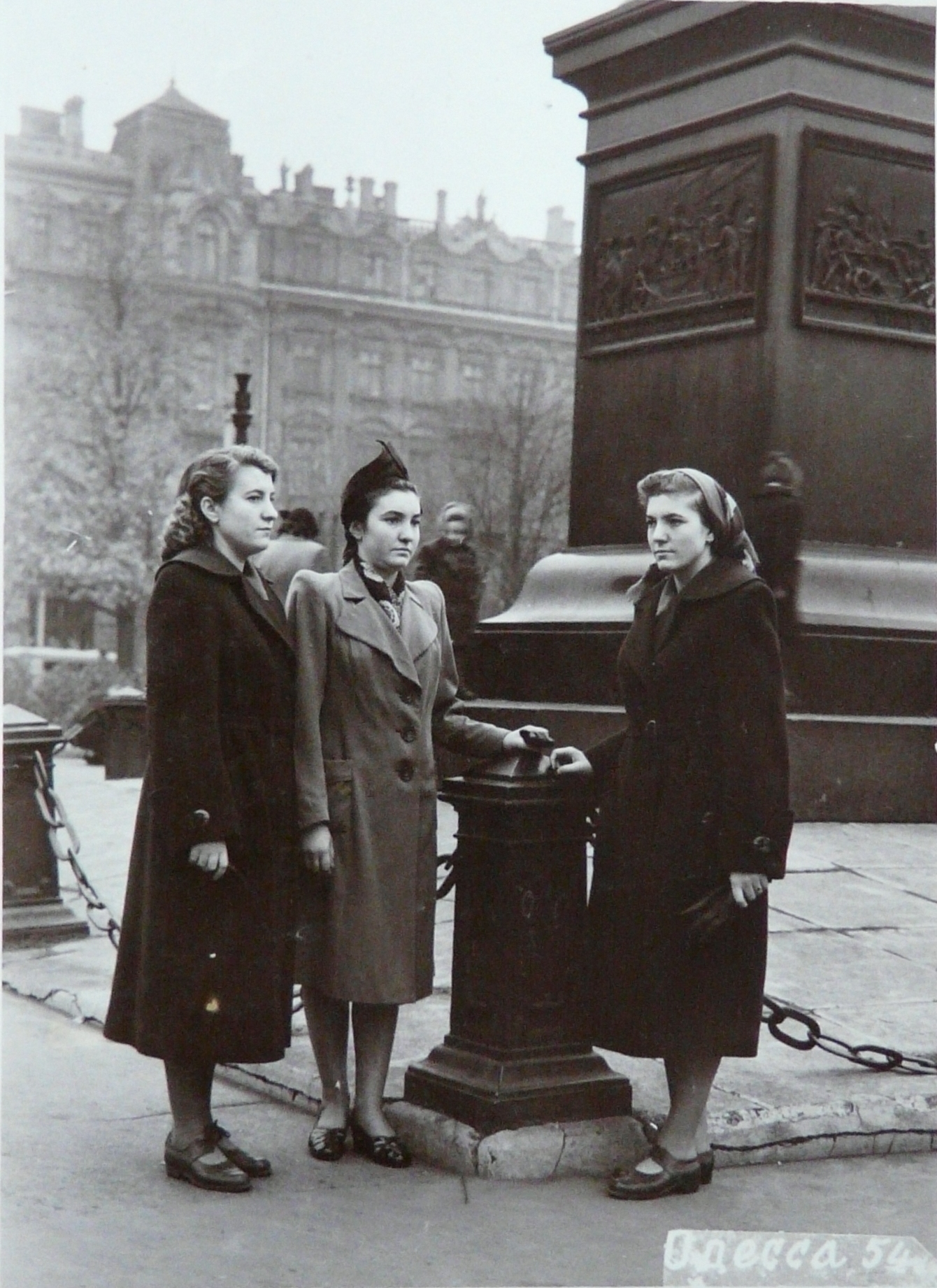
Daughters of Grigoriy Zhukovsky at Statue of Graf Vorontsov, Odessa on the Soviet Army Square in Odessa in 1954.

Nikolay joined Karagnda as motorman in March 1961. Motorman Ivan Gorbunkov already was a crew member of this ship in the same rank. Due to Odessa population mostly stocked up on coal for winter season beforehand, Ivan asked Nikolay to assist one family. Every seaman of Black Sea Shipping Company could receive a certain amount of coal without payment as the furnaces was used for heating in the houses in 1960-s still. Due to Nikolay was not married and had not own house he was agree to give own portion of coal to that family. For this reason was necessary to take signature, name and passport details for formalities and he visited that family. That was Zhukovsky family.

Zhukovsky family lived on the Kartamyshevskaya street, 26, Moldavanka district in Odessa. That was old courtyard that include 7 houses about. Moldavanka district was recognized as Intelligence center of Odessa historically due to the large network of catacombs beneath this district was used in the 19th century and the first half of the 20th century for smuggling, revolutionary activities, underground and partisan movement.

Grigoriy Fyodorovitch Zhukovsky was the head of family. His wife was Antonina Zhukovskaya (maiden name was Chernyavskaya). They already had three daughters. The eldest and the youngest daughters was not married yet. The medium daughter was married Ivan Gorbunkov in 1961, before May. Nikolay commenced meetings with the youngest daughter after the first visit to this family. Soon they were married, in September 1961.

The ship Karaganda carried cargoes to the Eastern Mediterranean ports and through Suez Canal to India, Yemen's ports. During period between May 1961 and October 1963, Karaganda did not visit Spain, France and did not pass Gibraltar strait. The main direction of this ship were Middle East, Yemen, India and Ceylon ports.

==== Historical events and motor-vessel Karaganda between December 1962 and December 1963. ====
- October 1962. Oleg Penkovsky, he was a chief officer of the special Department of the 3rd Directorate (the scientific and technical Directorate) of the GRU, came under KGB surveillance in December 1961. The lookout was arranged for all the British diplomats and the British, who lived in Moscow, and one of the contacts gave the trail to Penkovsky. Oleg Penkovsky was arrested on 22 October 1962.
- 2 February 1963. Ivan Serov was removed from the post of the chief of the GRU of the General Staff of the Soviet Armed Forces in connection with the "loss of vigilance", as was revealed Penkovsky. Nikita Khrushchev appointed Serov as the chief of the GRU on 10 December 1958. Khrushchev trusted Serov unconditionally to fulfill of his instructions. Serov participated in the suppression of the Hungarian Uprising of 1956. He led the arrests of participants in the uprising and the creation of new security agencies in Hungary. The failure of Penkovsky was a blow not only to the General Intelligence Department, but to the prestige of Khrushchev.
- 9 February 1963. The ship Karaganda arrived in Odessa from Alexandria, Egypt.
- March 1963. Due to the Syrian coup d'état on 8 March 1963, referred to by the Syrian government as the 8 March Revolution, the power in Syria was seized by the military committee of the Syrian Regional Branch of the Arab Socialist Ba'ath Party. Egypt and the Soviet Union began to lose influence over Syria.
- Due to the severe illness of Frol Kozlov from April 1963, the balance of power in the immediate environment N. S. Khrushchev and the Presidium of the CPSU Central Committee has changed radically. Nikita Khrushchev sought to find a replacement for Frol Kozlov and advanced to the first position in the guide Leonid Brezhnev and Nikolai Podgorny. In the meetings of the Presidium and Plenum of the Central Committee of the CPSU in October 1964, on which N. Khrushchev was sent into retirement, did not participate.
- On the 1-st of May 1963 the ship Karaganda was alongside in Latakia, Syria. It is confirmed by photographs, which recorded the visit of the British citizens on board of this ship due to Soviet celebration 1 May. Two soviet seamen, which were married the daughters of Zhukovsky family from M. Raskova (Kartamyshevskaya) street in Odessa, were a seamen of this ship and one of them was exactly on board of this ship during this visit (he is on the photo also, his eyes are closed on the photo). Necessary to pay attention, that in 1963 the jamming of transmissions by Soviet Jammer's stations was lifted, and the jamming was resumed in 1968, after the Czechoslovak events. The foreign Intelligence subdivisions had interest to M. Raskova street from 1962 or earlier. Can be this street was interesting for them after the Jammer installation on Kartamyshevskaya street? Seems the Jammer on Kartamyshevskaya street was not only for foreign station jamming, but it was also for the local radio-waves jamming to avoid any foreign radio-wave espionage. Anyhow motorman Nikolay did not speak English and the next attempts to start conversation between Nikolay and the foreigners, who was speaking Russian, had place during the next his ship Metallurg Anosov calls in Sydney in April 1964 and Kyoto in October 1975.
- 11 May 1963. Oleg Penkovsky was convicted of treason and sentenced to death (executed on 16 May 1963).
- From June 1963, the duties of the second Secretary of the Central Committee of the CPSU was performed by L. I. Brezhnev.
- The ship visited Venezia in summer 1963 approximately.
- October–December 1963. Nikolay was sing off the ship Karaganda for vacation on 1 October 1963. The ship Karaganda was used for marriage between two seamen of Karaganda and two daughters of Grigoriy Zhukovsky. If Ivan knew some details about Intelligence activity around Grigoriy Zukovsky family, Nikolay did not know about it from beginning. November 1963 The "beastito", the son of Nikolay, began to walk alone, without any support from anybody, on 2 November 1963. During the vacation Nikolay had to pass courses to change qualification to motoman of turbine engines. In December 1963 Nikolay joined the ship Metallurg Anosov, which was delivered to the Black Sea Shipping Company in the day of his son birthday, 29 September 1962. Is it was a coincidence of dates, or scheduled in advance for future intelligence activities? Due to the same coincidence of dates the son of Nikolay had alias "beastito". Obviously political events have affected the intelligence related to M. Raskova (Karamyshevskaya) street, 26, in Odessa. Leonid Brezhnev and others made the overall camp of the Soviet regime, which ousted Nikita Khrushchev and Yuri Andropov joined the camp later. Nikolay was joined the ship Metallurg Anosov and the name of this ship was associated with Georgy Zhukov, who had mutual understanding with Leonid Brezhnev and Yuriy Andropov.

=== The fate. ===
There is no any information about this ship during period from 1964 to 1967. Seems the ship was not active after 1963 due to ship's age 44–48.

The ship Karaganda, IMO number 5181861, was decommissioned, removed from the vessels' lists of Minmorflot and handed over to Glavvtorchrmet for dismantling and cutting into metal in 1967.

The new motor vessel Karaganda, IMO number 6912889, was built in GDR in June 1969 for the Baltic Sea Shipping Company, USSR.

== Crew members. ==
Captains:

- P. I. Boyko

== See also ==
- SS West Hosokie
- SS Corvus
- SS Nezhin
- SS Metallurg Anosov
- Kartamyshevskaya street
- Statue of Graf Vorontsov, Odessa
- Statue of Yuriy Dolgorukiy, Moscow
