= Kolomna-class cargo ship =

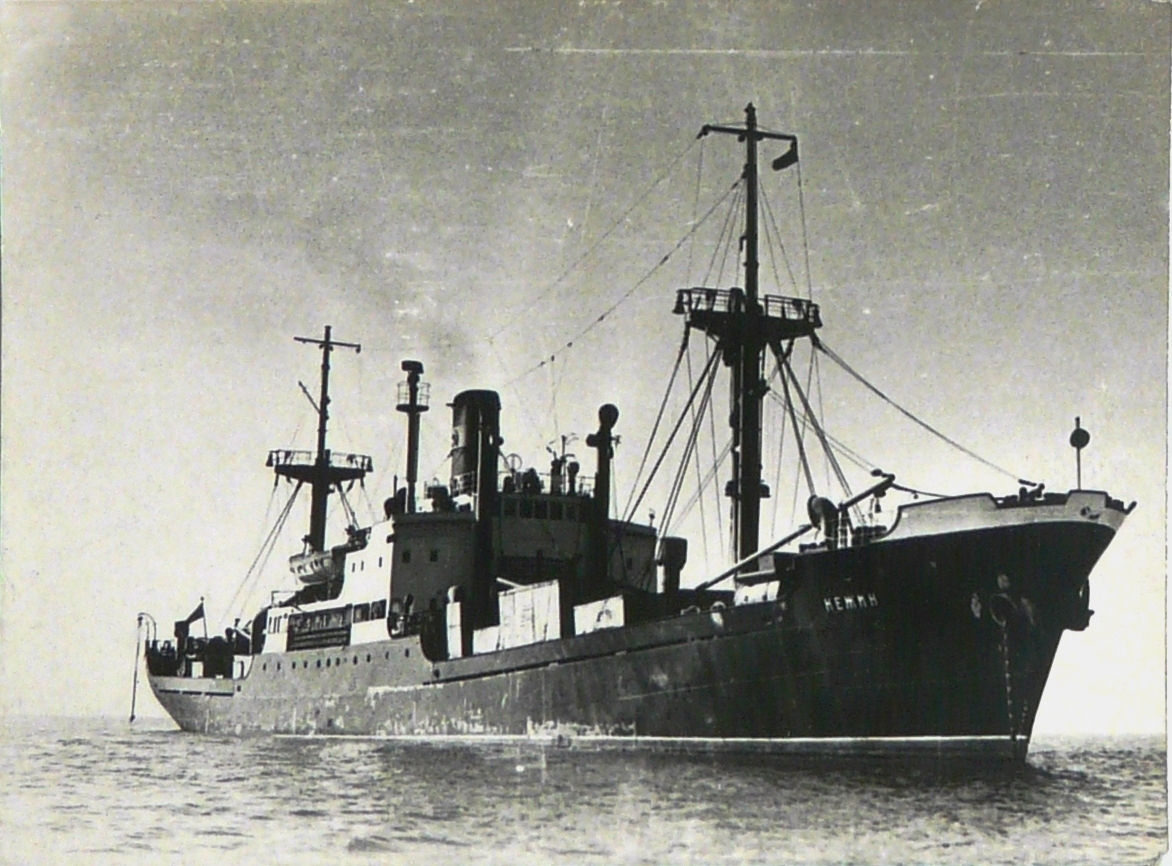
- Soviet steamer Nezhin is a Kolomna-class ship, built in 1956 or 1957

Class overview
- Name: Kolomna class (Project 233)
- Builders: VEB Schiffswerft Neptun, Rostock, East Germany
- Operators: Baltic Shipping Company; Latvian Shipping Company; Black Sea Shipping Company; Far East Shipping Company; Azov Shipping Company; Soviet Navy; Federal Agency for Maritime and River Transport; Lukoil; People's Republic of China
- Planned: 17
- Completed: 17

General characteristics
- Type: Dry cargo steamship
- Tonnage: GT: 3,245-3,862 tonnes; DWT: 4,355-4,410 tonnes
- Length: 102.33 m (335.7 ft)
- Beam: 14.44 m (47.4 ft)
- Draught: 6.65 m (21.8 ft)
- Installed power: 2450 hp (1800 kW)
- Speed: 13.6 knots (25.2 km/h)
- Capacity: 4 cargo compartments, 18 passengers
- Crew: 36

Kolomna class (Russian: Коломна класс) is a class of sea-going dry cargo steamers, tweendeckers, that were built in VEB Schiffswerft Neptun, Rostock, GDR, between 1952 and 1958, as per Projects 233. In total 17 Kolomna-class ships were built as per program for modernization of the Soviet Union merchant fleet.

The ships was delivered to the various shipping companies of the Soviet Union.

== Ship's data ==
Ship's type:

- steamer;
- dry cargo ship.

Constructive type:

- tweendecker;
- three-islands (3 structures): accommodation superstructure, forecastle and aftcastle);
- with a middle location of MO and accommodation superstructure;
- with a sloping nose and a cruiser stern.

Purpose: transportation of general cargo.

Length overall 102.33 m; length between perpendiculars 96.8 m; breadth 14.44 m
Moulded depth 7.93 m; draught 6.65 m.

GT = 3245-3862 mt, DWT = 4355-4410 mt, speed 12,6 / 13,6 knots.

One main steam boiler «DMT 24 50/90" (GDR) with capacity 2450 hp (1800 kW).

All ships were steamers before 1961 and engines of all ships were modernized to liquid oil from 1961.

Cargo corpartments: total 4.

Cargo gear: 8 cargo derricks (2 for each cargo corpartment) and 2 heavy lift cargo derricks.

All ships had high ventilation heads (ganders or mushrooms) and was possible to divide all Kolomna-class ships to some subclasses as per ventilation heads type.

Crew: 36 persons.
Passengers or cadets: 18 persons.

== Ships in class ==
Official № Register № Call Sign; IMO number	Original name English name Deadweight; GT	Keel laid down Launched date Delivery date Scrapped or Lost	History
810/203; М-21774; UVCM; 5191907	Коломна; Kolomna; DWT = 4355 mt GT = 3258 mt	25 June 1951; 29 April 1952; 21 February 1953; 1978	The ship was included to Baltic State Shipping Company, home port Leningrad, on 21 of February, 1953. And after trials she was delivered to the Soviet Union finally on 23 of November, 1953, on account of war reparations.
811; М-21775; UVCN; 5180453	Калуга; Kaluga; DWT = GT =	? ? March 1954; August 1979	The ship worked in Latvian Shipping Company.
812; М-21833; UQQK; 5332329	Смела; Smela; DWT = 4401 mt GT = 3261 mt	? ? June 1954; 2006	The ship worked in Black Sea Shipping Company, commissioned on 15 of July 1954, and was transferred to Azov Shipping Company in 1969 abt. Beached on 23 of July, 2006, and scrapped in Aliağa, Turkey, in 2006. Photo: The ship Smela at anchor in Turkish waters.
813; М-21865; UQQL; 5250480	Нежин; Nezhin; DWT = 4475 mt GT = 3262 mt	1953 ? July 1954; 1978	The ship worked in Black Sea Shipping Company and Azov Shipping Company.
814; М-21866; UQQM; 5183015	Кашира; Kashira; DWT = GT =	? ? September 1954; 14 June 1980	The ship worked in Latvian Shipping Company.
817 U... 5619093	Красноармейск; Krasnoarmeysk; DWT = GT =	? ? 31 December 1954 ?	Later the ships was delivered to Soviet Union Navy and renamed Мегра (Megra)
818; М-22651; UOLW; 5195018	Котлас; Kotlas; DWT = GT =	? ? August 1955 ?	The ship worked in Latvian Shipping Company from 1955 and was delivered to Northern Shipping Company. Still alive.
819 U... 5619063	Кузнецк; Kuznetsk; DWT = GT =	? ? 29 June 1955 ?	The ship worked in Far East State Shipping Company from 1955. She was delivered to Red Banner Northern Fleet in 1964 about and changed name to Сванетия (Svanetiya).
834; М-22701; UNIW; 5180661	Каменск; Kamensk; DWT = GT =	? ? October 1955; July 2003	The ship worked in Baltic Shipping Company. She was rebuilt as Teaching Training Ship. Than it was signed on to "Lukoil - Navigator" Ltd. Scrapped in 2003.
835; М-24513; USKD; 5025380	Арзамас; Arzamas; DWT = GT = ?	? ? November 1955 ?	The ship worked in Latvian Shipping Company.
836; М-24514; USKE; 5034367	Балашов; Balashov; DWT = GT =	? ? December 1955; September 1985	The ship worked in Latvian Shipping Company. Scrapped in Aviles, Spain, in 1985.
837; М-24515; UNGR; 5017151	Ангарск; Angarsk; DWT = GT =	? ? March 1956; 1980	The ship worked in Baltic Shipping Company.
852 U... / BRVB; 7734210	Кизил; Kizil; DWT = GT =	? ? April 1958 ?	
854 U... 7734193	Калач; Kalach; DWT = GT =	? ? February 1958 ?	
855 U... / BPKT; 7734208	Серов; Serov; DWT = GT =	? ? April 1958 ?	In 1958 delivered to China and renamed Ho Ping 45. In 1967 renamed Zhan Dou 45. In 1985 renamed He Ping 45.
856 U... 7734222	Кунгур; Kungur; DWT = GT =	? ? April 1958 ?	
857; М-25160; UIAB; 5191921	Колпино; Kolpino; DWT = 4287 mt GT = 3245 mt	? ? March 1958; 2002	The ship worked in Baltic Shipping Company. Decommissioned from Soviet Union Merchant Fleet and delivered to Murmansk in 1985, and from this year was mentioned as Teaching Training Ship. Scrapped in Liepāja, Latvia in 2002.
