= Black Sea Shipping Company =

Ukrainian shipping company

- Type: State company
- Industry: Maritime transport
- Founded: 1833
- Headquarters: Kyiv, Ukraine
- Number of employees: 29
- Website: blasco.com.ua

Black Sea Shipping Company (Ukrainian: Чорноморське морське пароплавство; Russian: Черноморское морское пароходство) is a Ukrainian shipping company based in Kyiv.

The company was established during the Imperial Russian rule in 1833. Following the World War I and reorganization of the former empire as a Soviet state, company was owned by the Soviet government. During Soviet rule, the company held the title of world's largest shipping company for several years and was instrumental in important foreign trade and international aid initiatives of the Soviet government.

== History ==
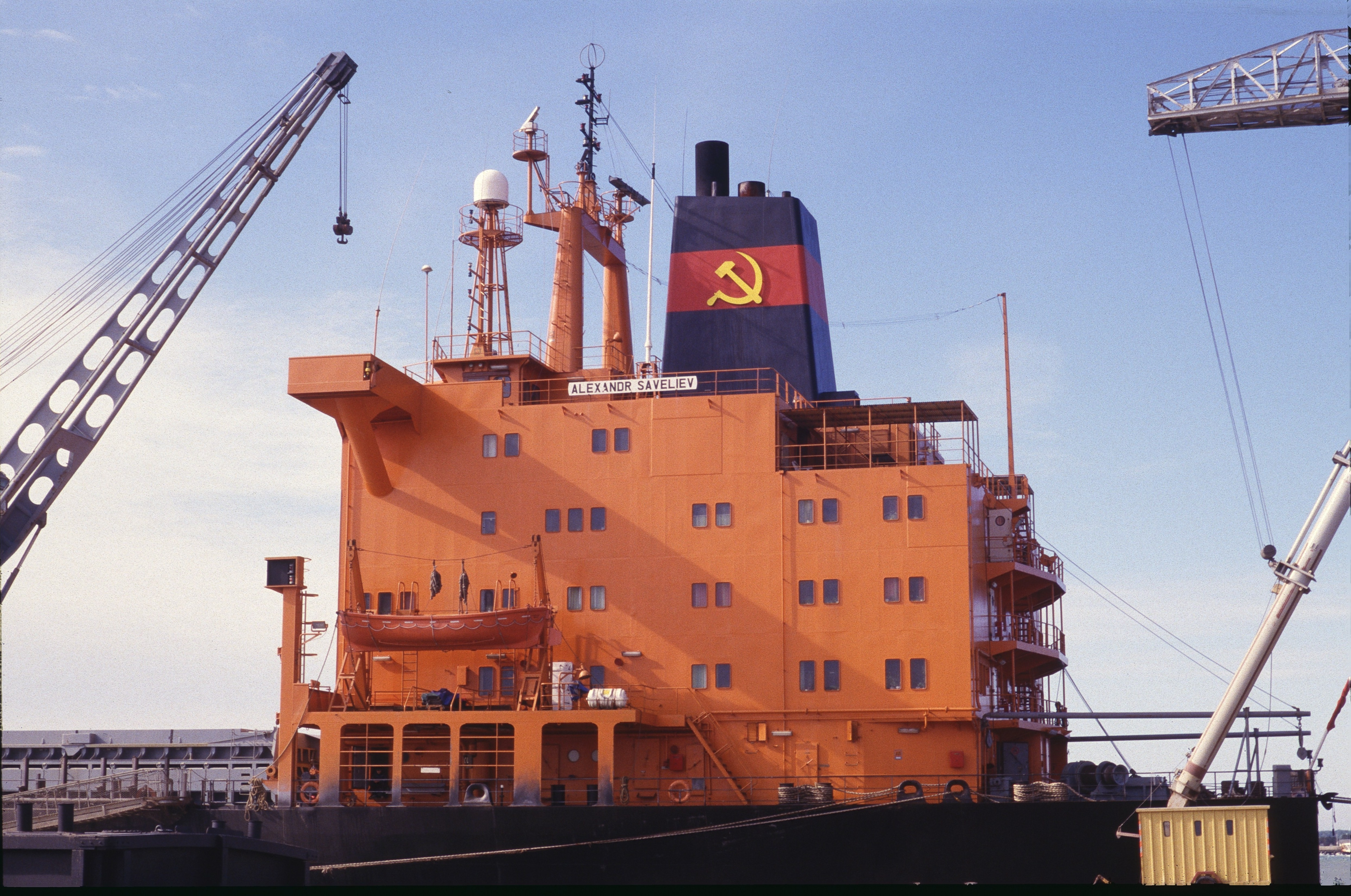
Funnels of the Black Sea Shipping Co. cargo ships during Soviet period were the same as the funnel of cargo ship "Alexandr Saveliev". Some vessels, mostly passenger ships, had the same red stripe and red emblem on the white color funnels.

The company can trace its history to 16 May 1833, when the Black Sea Society of Steamships (ROPiT) was established as means of permanent communications between Odessa and Istanbul, but the company disappeared after the Crimean War of the 1850s. The company was re-established on 13 June 1922 as Black Sea - Azov Sea Shipping by the Council of Labour and Defence as part of the People's Commissariat of Communication Routes and administered by the Central Administration of State Merchant Fleet (Gostorgflot). The Black Sea - Azov Sea Shipping company split into Black Sea Shipping Company, Azov Sea Shipping Company and Georgian Shipping Company after World War II. Another split took place in 1964 when a new company, Novorossiysk Shipping Company, was created from the tanker division of the Black Sea Shipping Company.

Azov Sea region management of Black Sea Shipping Company was created in Mariupol (then known as Zhdanov) in 1953. Azov Sea region management was reorganized in Azov Sea Shipping Company in 1967. It is why some ships of Black Sea Shipping Company ships were handed over changed to Azov Sea Shipping Company and home port was changed from Odesa to Mariupol. So, two sister ships Nezhin and Smela were transferred to Azov Sea Shipping Company in 1969 or in 1967.

In 1990, Black Sea Shipping was the biggest one in Europe among other shipping companies and the second in whole world. With the fall of the Soviet Union, the company was passed from the Ministry of Sea Fleet of the Soviet Union as a state company of Ukraine and later registered with the State Property Fund of Ukraine.

On 13 August 1993, President Leonid Kravchuk issued the Decree #303, creating the state conglomeration "Blasko" based on "Black Sea Shipping Company". The Decree was canceled in January 1995.

Speaking in 2013, Kravchuk accepted his blame for decisions leading to ruining of the "Black Sea Shipping Company".

== Leaders of the Black Sea Shipping Company ==
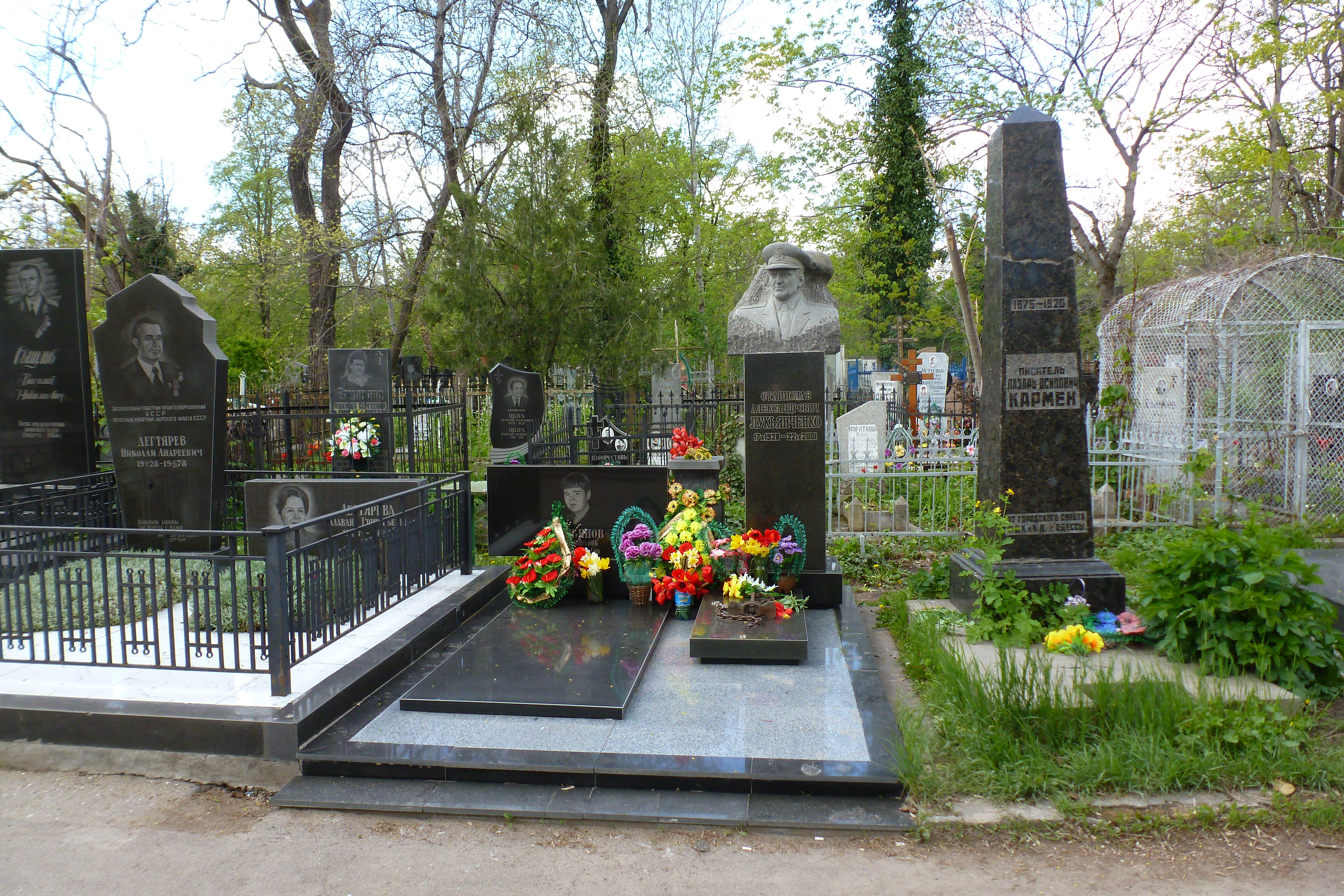
The tombstones of Stanislav Lukiyanchenko (center) on the Second Christian Cemetery in Odesa.

- 1928—1931 — F. I. Matveyev
- 1931—1934 — Boris Matveyevich Zanko
- 1934—1935 — P. P. Koval
- 1935—1937 — Genrikh Yakovlevich Magon
- 1937 — Andrey Sergeyevich Polkovskiy
- 25.11.1938—15.05.1939 — Semyon Ivanovich Tyomkin
- 1939—1941 — Georgiy Afanasiyevich Mezentsev
- 1942 — Ivan Georgiyevich Syryh (could be leader of Black Sea Shipping department "Sovtanker")
- 1941—1944 — Pahom Mihailovich Makarenko
- 1956—1972 — Aleksey Yevgeniyevich Danchenko — The favorite leader of the Black Sea Shipping Company sailors.
- 1972—1975 — A. V. Goldobenko
- 1975—1978 — Oleg Konstantinovich Tomas
- 1978—1986 — Stanislav Aleksandrovich Lukiyanchenko
- 1986—1992 — Viktor Vasiliyevich Pilipyenko
- 1992—1994 — Pavlo Kudyukin
- 1994—1995 — Oleksiy Koval
- 1995—1997 — Oleksandr Stohniyenko
- 1997—1998 — Oleksandr Diordiyev
- 1998—2000 — Serhiy Melashchenko
- 2000—2002 — Borys Shcherbak
- 2002—2004 — Mykhailo Mazovskyi
- 2004—2009 — Yevhen Kozhevin
- 2021 - Smetanin Volodymyr

== Fleet ==
Black Sea Shipping company was the biggest company in the world in the 1980s as per quantity of sea-going vessels. The company had more than 250 sea-going ships during the best times.

== Ports and harbours of operation ==
During the Soviet Union period and after the creation of the Novorossiysk Sea Shipping Company all of the large ports on the present Ukrainian territory except Sevastopol, Asov Sea ports, Kerch port and Danube river ports were owned and administered by the Black Sea Shipping Company. After the collapse of the Soviet Union these ports separated from the shipping company.

Ports of Black Sea Shipping Co. during Soviet Union period:

- Constellation of the Black Sea basin (by analogy with the word Mediterranean):
  - Odesa
  - Chornomorsk
  - Yuzhne
- River ports:
  - Mykolaiv Sea port
  - Kherson Sea port
  - Bilhorod-Dnistrovsky
- Crimea ports
  - Yalta
  - Alushta
  - Feodosiya

Before the creation of the Novorossiysk Sea Shipping Company, the Black Sea Shipping Company also included all ports of Novorossiysk Sea Shipping Company on the east coast of the Black Sea:

- Novorossiysk
- Tuapse

The main port was Odessa during all times. And most of tonnage of cargо passed via Constellation of the Black Sea basin - Odessa, Chornomorsk, Yuzhne ports.

Sevastopol was not a Black Sea Shipping Company port. It was a naval port of Soviet Union in Black Sea.

== Ships of Black Sea Shipping Company ==
=== List of ships ===
List of current ships

- Volzhskiy class cargo ship:
1. Aleksandr Lebed (received from Kama Shipping in 2014)
- Volgo-Don class cargo ship:
1. Catharine (received from unknown in 2002)
2. Chalsi (received from Volga Shipping in 2001)
3. Vasiliy Tatischev (received from Kama Shipping in 2014)
- Chelsea class cargo ship: (all built in Kherson based on Volgo-Don class cargo ships)
1. Chelsea-1 (received from Malta in 2014)
2. Chelsea-2 (2006)
3. Chelsea-3 (2006)
4. Chelsea-4 (2007)
5. Chelsea-5 (2007)
6. Chelsea-6 (2008)
7. Chelsea-7 (2010)
- Ganz class floating cranes: (built in Budapest, Hungary)
1. Stryzh (1997)

=== List of ships used with Saluta Shipping ===
In association with Kama Shipping

- Volgo-Don class cargo ship:
1. Corvus (received from unknown in 2011)
2. Evgenia Z (received from unknown in 2011)
3. Nikolay Meshkov (received from Cyprus in 2011)

=== List of former ships ===
During the best period of this company, which was the 1970s to the first part of the 1980s, it had more than 250 sea going ships. The company had the following ships, (with description in brackets mentioning the years of a ship with the Black Sea Shipping Company):

==== Passengers ships ====
- Ex. Nazi Germany passenger ships which were received by the Soviet Union as per the Allies Agreement:
1. Admiral Nakhimov (1954-1986)
2. Admiral Ushakov (1946-1975)
3. Rossia (7 Feb, 1946 — 1985)
4. Pobeda (18 Feb, 1946 — end of 1970s)
5. Ukraina
- Other purchased passenger ships:
1. Pyotr Velikiy, previously Polish Jagiełło, previously German Duala
- Ivan Franko class passenger ships:
1. MS Shota Rustaveli
2. MS Ivan Franko
- Belorussiya-class cruiseferry:
1. MS Belorussiya
2. MS Gruziya (1975—1996)
3. Azeibarzhan (1975-1996)

==== Cargo ships ====
1. Коммунист (1922 — 14.01.1942), ex. UK ship Regimen (built in 1891). From 14.01.1942 the ship was included in Black Sea Naval Force fleet and was lost on 24.02.1942, due to World War II.
2. Передовик (English: Peredovik) (1939-1951). The ship was built in the Soviet Union in 1939, transferred in 1951 to the Far East Shipping Company.
- Ex. Germany cargo ships which were taken by Soviet Union as per the Alias Agreement:
- Belorussia-class cargo ships or West-class. Total 11 general cargo ships of this class were transferred from Far East Shipping Company to Black Sea Shipping Company:
1. Белоруссия (6 June 1947 — 28 Nov, 1960)
2. Восток (5 July 1948 — 26 Sept, 1966)
3. Лермонтов (end of 1940's — 12 Jan, 1966)
4. Плеханов (21 Sept, 1949 — 9 March 1950)
5. Тарас Шевченко (21 Sept, 1949 — 7 March 1963)
6. Вторая Пятилетка (6 Feb, 1950 — 23 March 1967)
7. Иркутск (9 March 1950 — 27 May 1966)
8. Караганда (9 March 1950 — 1967). This ship was used on the line between Black Sea Soviet ports and India ports.
9. Кавказ (11 June 1950 — 2 March 1955)
10. Омск (ex. Капитан Вислобоков) (11 June 1950 — 3 Feb, 1959)
11. Аргунь, ex. US ship West Modus from 1919 to 1942, (12 April 1951 — 11 April 1962).
- Kolomna-class cargo ships, - total 2 ships of this class ships were in Black Sea Shipping Company:
1. Nezhin
2. Smela
- Divnogorsk-class cargo ships
1. SS Divnogorsk (1961)
2. SS Mednogorsk (1961)
- Leninsky Komsomol class cargo ships, - total 25 ships
1. SS Leninsky Komsomol (1959)
2. SS Metallurg Baykov (1960)
3. SS Fizik Kurchatov
4. SS Metallurg Anosov
5. SS Bratstvo (1963)
6. and others
- Slavyansk-class cargo ships or Slanyanye-class cargo ships were built in Soviet Union:
1. Slanyansk
2. Sarny
- Liberty class cargo ships. In addition to 40 Liberty ships purchased by the Soviet Union under Lend-Lease during World War II. 10 vessels of this type were purchased for the Black Sea State Shipping Company from Europe (mainly in Italy) in 1963:
1. Алатау
2. Авача
3. Бештау
4. Дарьял (1963-1977),ех. George Whitefield which was built at the "Southeastern Shipbuilding Corporation" shipyard in 1943 and sold to Norway in 1947 and changed name to Wilford, then sold to Italy in 1957 and changed name to Orata. The ship was purchased by Soviet Union in 1963 and scrapped in 1977.
5. Карпаты
6. Хибины
7. Машук
8. Саяны
9. Сихотэ-Алинь
10. Малахов Курган
- Kommunist-class cargo ships were built in East Germany:
1. Fridrikh Engels
2. Rosa Luksemburg
3. Ernst Telman (Russian: Эрнст Тельман) (1970—1997), IMO 7023269
4. Toyvo Antikaynen

==== Oil tanker ====
- Apsheron-class, former Antarctica scientific research ship built in Copenhagen, Denmark; refit as oil tanker
1. Tuapse (1953-1954), illegally seized by Republic of China Navy of the Kuomintang regime

== See also ==
- FC Chornomorets Odesa
- Video "Passenger ships of Black Sea Shipping Company"
- Video "Black Sea Shipping Company ships"
