= Maykop (disambiguation) =

Maykop is the capital city of the Republic of Adygea, Russia.

Maykop or Maikop may also refer to:

- Maykop culture, prehistoric culture of the northern Caucasus, ca. 3500 BCE–2500 BCE
  - Maikop kurgan, the eponym for the Maykop culture
- Maykop Airport, a civilian airport in the Republic of Adygea, Russia

== See also ==
- Maykopsky (disambiguation)
