= SS Nezhin =

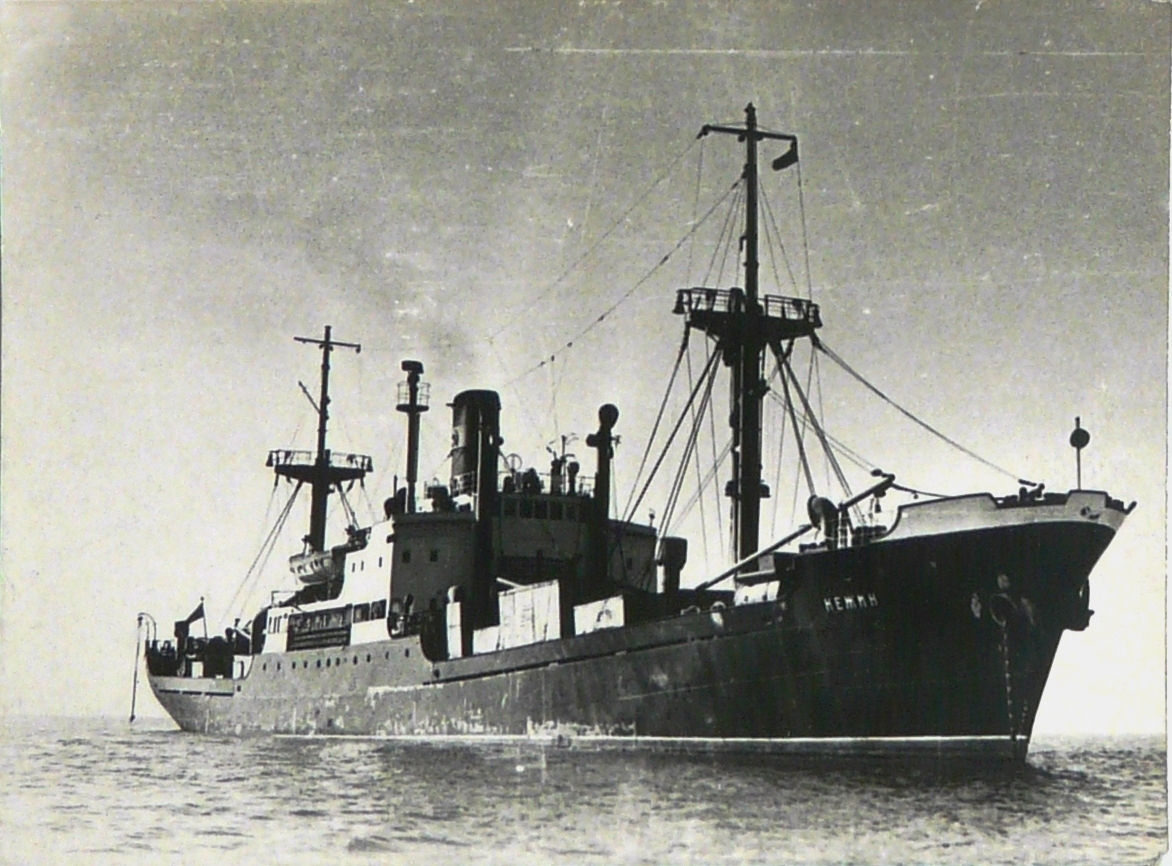
- Soviet steam ship Nezhin had black hull from the beginning. Photo dated before 1959.

History
- Name: Nezhin; (Russian: Нежин); Call sign: UQQL; Shipbuilding №: 813; Register: Register of USSR; Register №: М-21865; IMO number 5250480
- Namesake: Kolomna-class cargo ships, project 233
- Owner: July 1954 – 1969: Black Sea Shipping Company, (Soviet Union) USSR; 1969 – 1978: Azov Sea Shipping Company, (Soviet Union) USSR
- Operator: July 1954 – 1969: Black Sea Shipping Company, (Soviet Union) USSR; 1969 – 1978: Azov Sea Shipping Company, (Soviet Union) USSR
- Port of registry: July 1954 – 1969: Odessa, (Soviet Union) USSR; 1969 – 1978: Zhdanov, (Soviet Union) USSR
- Builder: (East Germany) Meyer Neptun Rostock - Rostock, GDR.
- Laid down: 1953
- Refit: Re-equipment for liquid fuel in 1961
- Fate: Scrapped in 1978

General characteristics
- Type: freighter, tweendecker
- Tonnage: GT 3,262 mt; DW 4,475 mt
- Length: length overall 336 ft (102.3 m); length between perpendiculars 314 ft (95.8 m)
- Beam: 47 ft (14.4 m)
- Height: Moulded depth 26 ft (7.9 m)
- Draught: 21.8 ft (6.65 m)
- Propulsion: Valce twin steam engine of "DMT 24 50/90" Lents built in GDR in 1952. 2,450 HP. Single screw propeller had diameter 4.8 m.
- Speed: in ballast 13.6 knots; loaded 13.0 knots
- Crew: 36 persons + 18 passengers or cadets

Nezhin (Russian:Нежин), was a merchant steam ship of Black Sea Shipping Company (Soviet Union) from July 1954 to 1965 and of Azov Sea Shipping Company (Soviet Union) from 1965 to 1978, tweendecker type general cargo ship. It was one of the Kolomna-class cargo ships, project 233. The ship was named in honor of Nizhyn, Ukraine.

== History ==
The construction of the ship Nezhin commenced in 1953 in Rostock, GDR. The ship was built and handed over to Black Sea Shipping Company in July, 1954. Only two ships of Kolomna-class cargo ships was built for Black Sea Shipping Company: Nezhin and Smela. And both this ships were built in July 1954. All other Kolomna-class ships worked in other Shipping Companies of the USSR.

=== Voyages to Egypt and Syria ===
The Soviet Union first time offered politically and economic assistance to Syria in 1955 in case Syria had been refusing to join the Baghdad Pact (CENTO). Baghdad Pact was created as per initiative of the US, UK and Turkey military Association, including Iraq, Iran and Pakistan, whose main purpose was to fight against "Communist aggression".

Soviet Foreign Minister Shepilov Dmitry Trofimovich visited Syria in June 1956. He offered that in addition to political and economic assistance can be military assistance from the Soviet Union to the young Syrian state. In 1956 the first 60 specialists were sent to Syria, and began delivery weapons (from the fighter planes and tanks to ammunition) from Czechoslovakia with a total value of $18 million. At the end of the year, the Soviet Union and Syria signed first direct agreement on deliveries of weapons, jet aircraft and anti-aircraft guns, and also about the training of Syrian military personnel. At the same time, the countries of the Baghdad Pact organized economic pressure on Syria, including a boycott of Syrian goods.

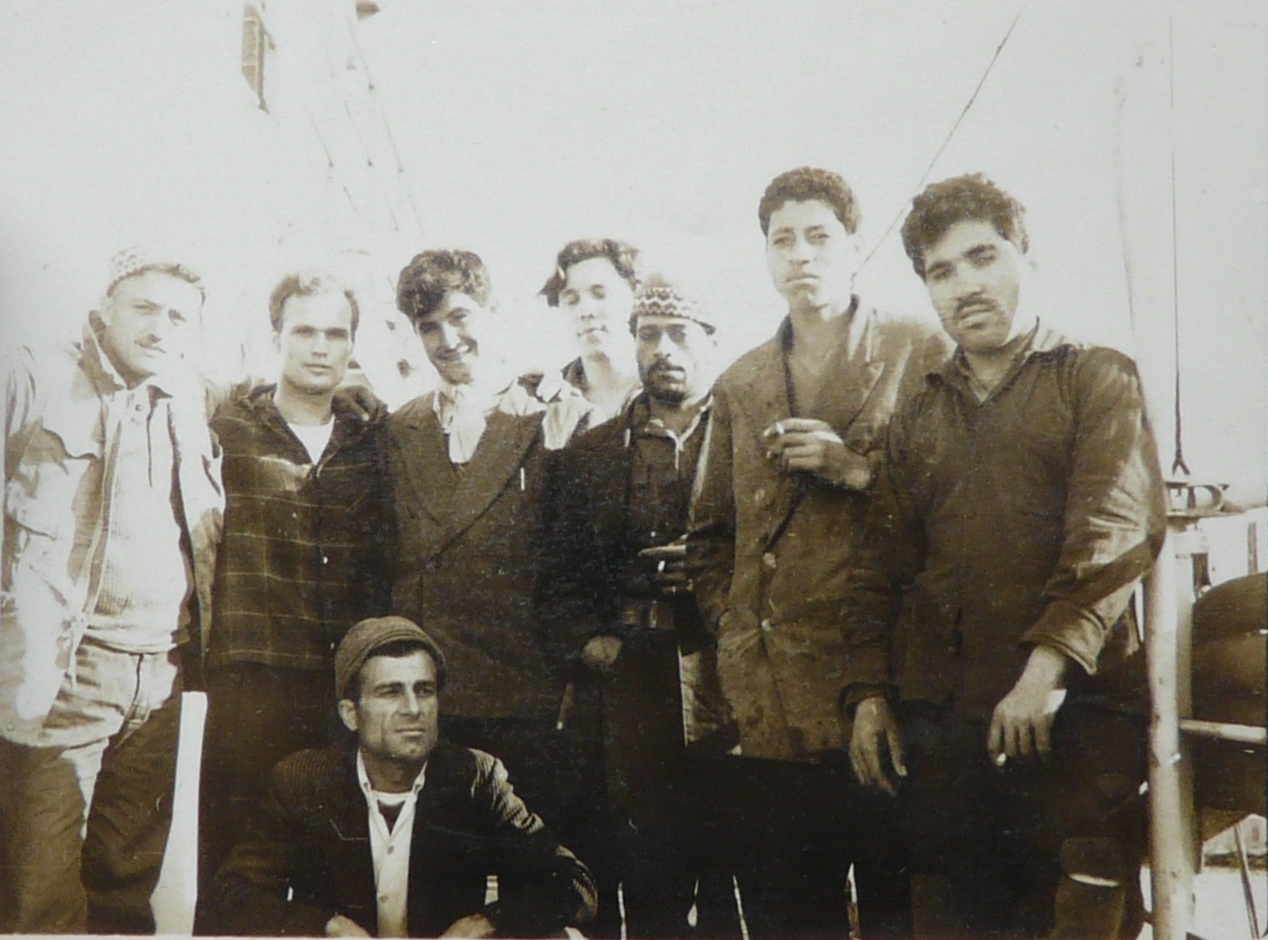
Stoker Nikolay (The second from the left), electrician Shumilov (his eyes are closed) and Syrian stevedores on board of the ship Nezhin in Syria, between July 1956 and April 1957.

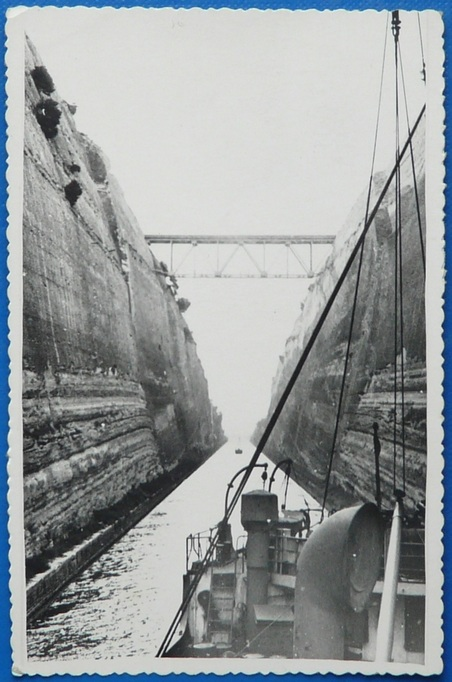
Steamer Nezhin in Corinth Canal. The photo dated between summer 1956 and 1960.

After voyage Soviet Union-Egypt-Soviet Union in May–June 1956, ship Nezhin passed to discharge cargo in Syria in summer 1956.

On 26 July 1956, Egyptian President Gamal Abdel Nasser gave a speech in Alexandria announcing the nationalization of the Suez Canal Company, owned by the French and the British, as a means to fund the Aswan Dam project in light of the British–American withdrawal (Withdrawal was completed on 18 July 1956).

The nationalization of the channel led to the invasion of the British, French and Israeli troops and the beginning of the Suez campaign (October 1956 - March 1957). The channel was partially destroyed, part of the ships were sunk. Shipping was closed until 10 April 1957, when Suez Canal was cleared with the help of UN forces.

The Nezhin often visited Syria and Egypt after 1956 also. Cargo for discharge in these countries was loaded in the Soviet Union.

=== The cargo for the Soviet Union ===
Nezhin loaded cotton bales in Egypt to discharge this cargo in Novorossiysk or in Kherson port for "Kherson cotton-paper factory", which was founded in 1952 and the first products were released in 1954.

Also the ship often loaded bauxite in Itea region, Greece, to discharge in Nikolayev. During this voyages and some voyages to Italy and back, Nezhin had to pass through Corinth Canal.

=== Voyage to Algeria ===
Since the beginning of the liberation war against colonial France from 1954 to 1962 the USSR rendered full support to Algeria. It included speeches in defense of the Algerian people in the United Nations, in various international forums, providing financial, material and military assistance, the organization of solidarity campaigns on an international scale with Algerians struggle for freedom and independence. The ship brought cargo to Algeria. The ship dropped anchor at Algerian port and was awaiting free berth. Due to the war in Algeria one small military catter kept guard at the ship Nezhin to prohibit the ship from divers or torpedo boat attack.

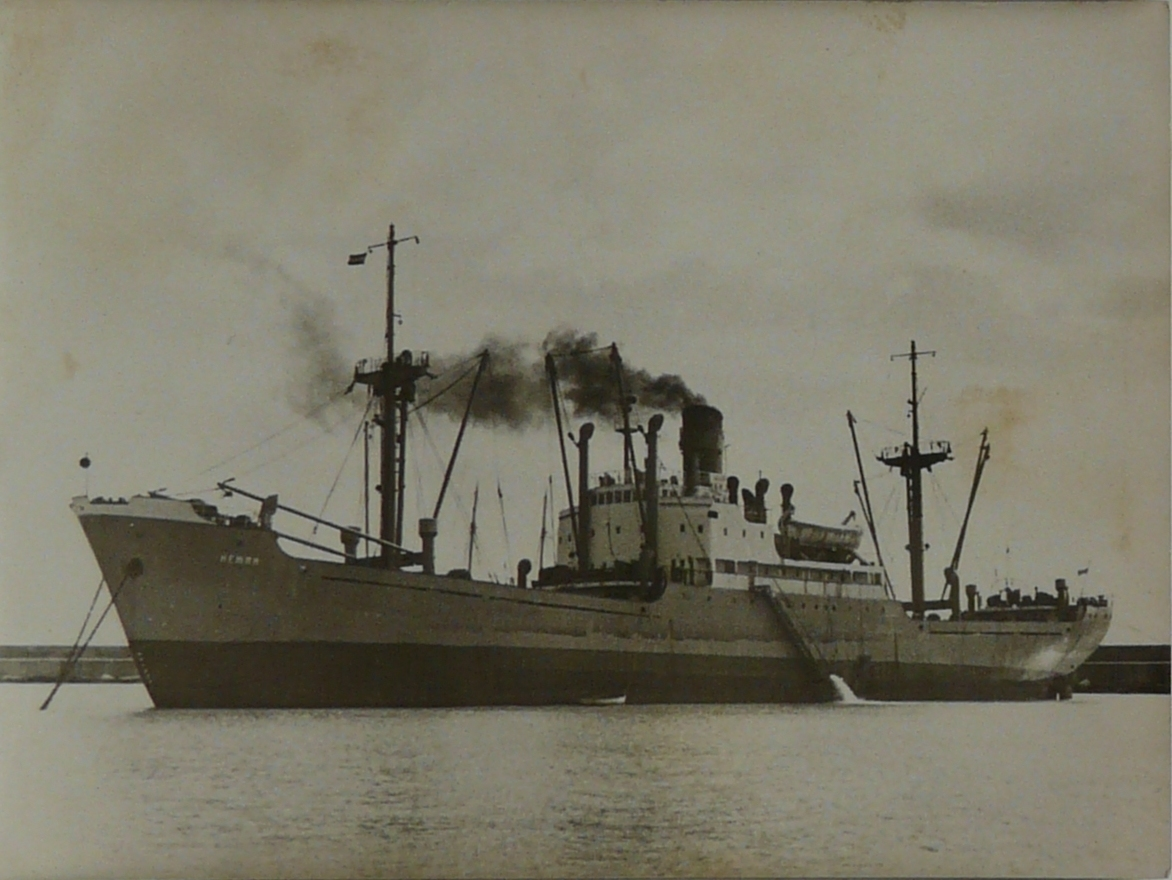
Soviet steam ship Nezhin anchored and moored can be in Egipt (Port-Said) or in Siria. Photo dated between 1958 and 1960 years including.

8 of March, 1958 year, Yemen became a member of the United Arab Republic Confederation. Soviet experts began to build port facilities at Hodeida, "Ahmadi" port, in 1958.

The Nezhin brought cargo from the USSR to North Yemen, Hodeidah port.

Soviet Society of Red Cross and Red Crescent sent 10.000 tons of wheat to Yemen in 1959 to help in overcoming the effects of drought. But the steamer Nezhin carried military cargo to North Yemen mostly including tanks.

The above water part of the ship Nezhin hull was re-painted in light grey color, seems before 1960.

Only one voyage of Nezhin was from Black Sea to Ceylon and seems it was between end of 1959 and September 1960.

=== Reapair in Bulgaria ===
The ship's repair commenced in spring or summer 1960 and completed in the end of 1960 or in the first part of January 1961.

Preparations for the filming of movie "Striped Trip" commenced in April and May 1960.

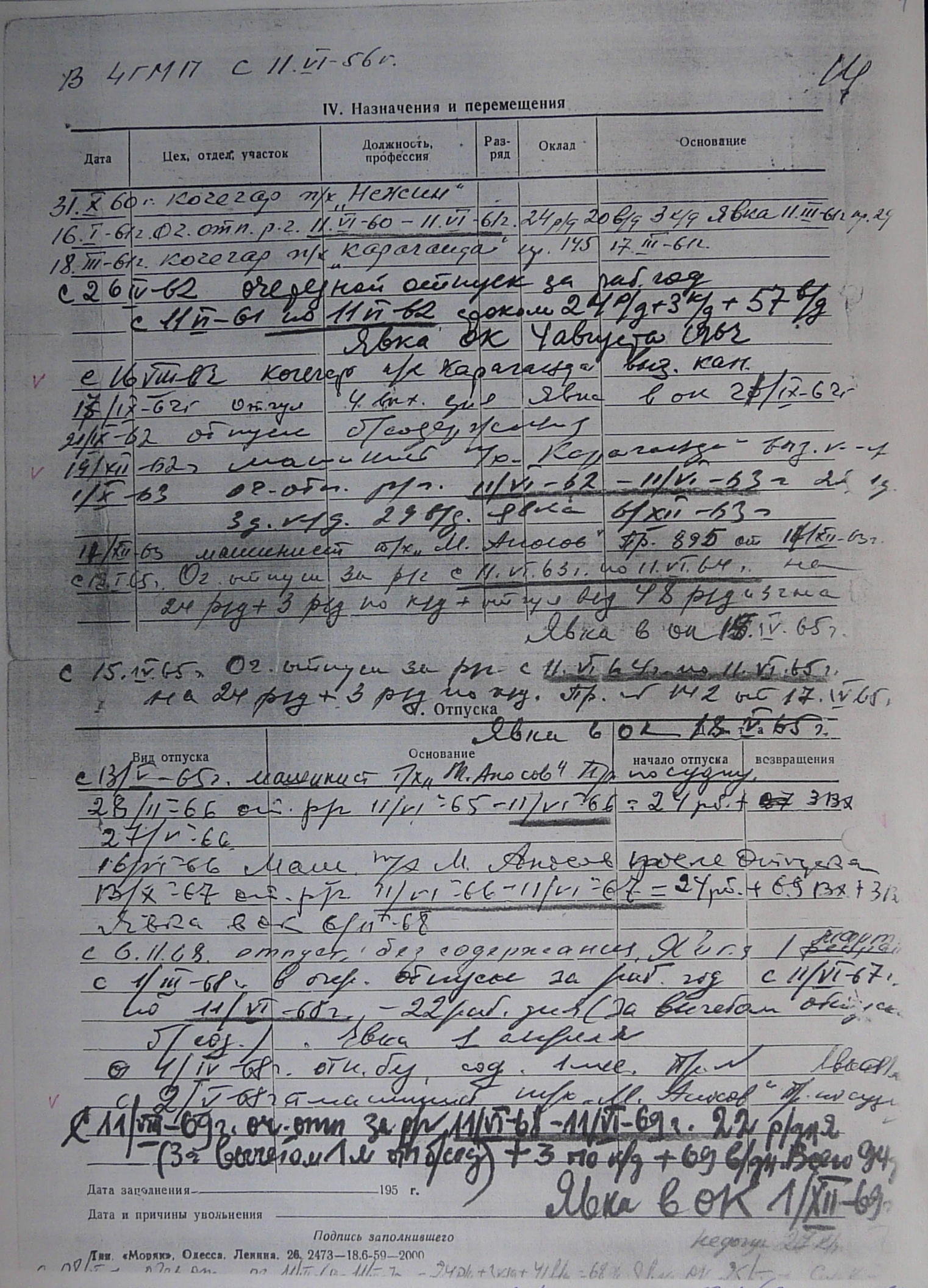
One side of card from the personnel department of Black Sea Shipping Company as confirmation that the person worked on the ships Nezhin, Karaganda, Metallurg Anosov. Only this person worked on this 3 ships.

=== Re-equipment of the ship for liquid fuel ===
After sailing from Bulgaria the ship Nezhin arrived in Odessa and commenced re-equipment for liquid fuel. Nikolay was signed off for vacation from the steam ship Nezhin on 16 January 1961. His next ship was steamer Karaganda.

So, the steamer Nezhin became the motor ship Nezhin from 1961.

=== Azov Sea Shipping Company ===
Azov Sea region management of Black Sea Shipping Company was created in Zhdanov in 1953. Azov Sea region management was reorganized in Azov Sea Shipping Company in 1967. It is why some ships of Black Sea Shipping Company ships were handed over changed to Azov Sea Shipping Company and home port was changed from Odessa to Zhdanov. So, two sister ships Nezhin and Smela were transferred to Azov Sea Shipping Company in 1969 or in 1967.

=== The fate ===
The last voyage of the ship Nezhin was from Azov Sea, from Zhdanov port, to La Spezia in 1978 and then the ship was scrapped in 1978.

== See also ==
- Cold War
- Statue of Yuriy Dolgorukiy, Moscow
- SS Karaganda
- SS Metallurg Anosov
- Pirates of the 20th Century
