= SS West Hosokie =

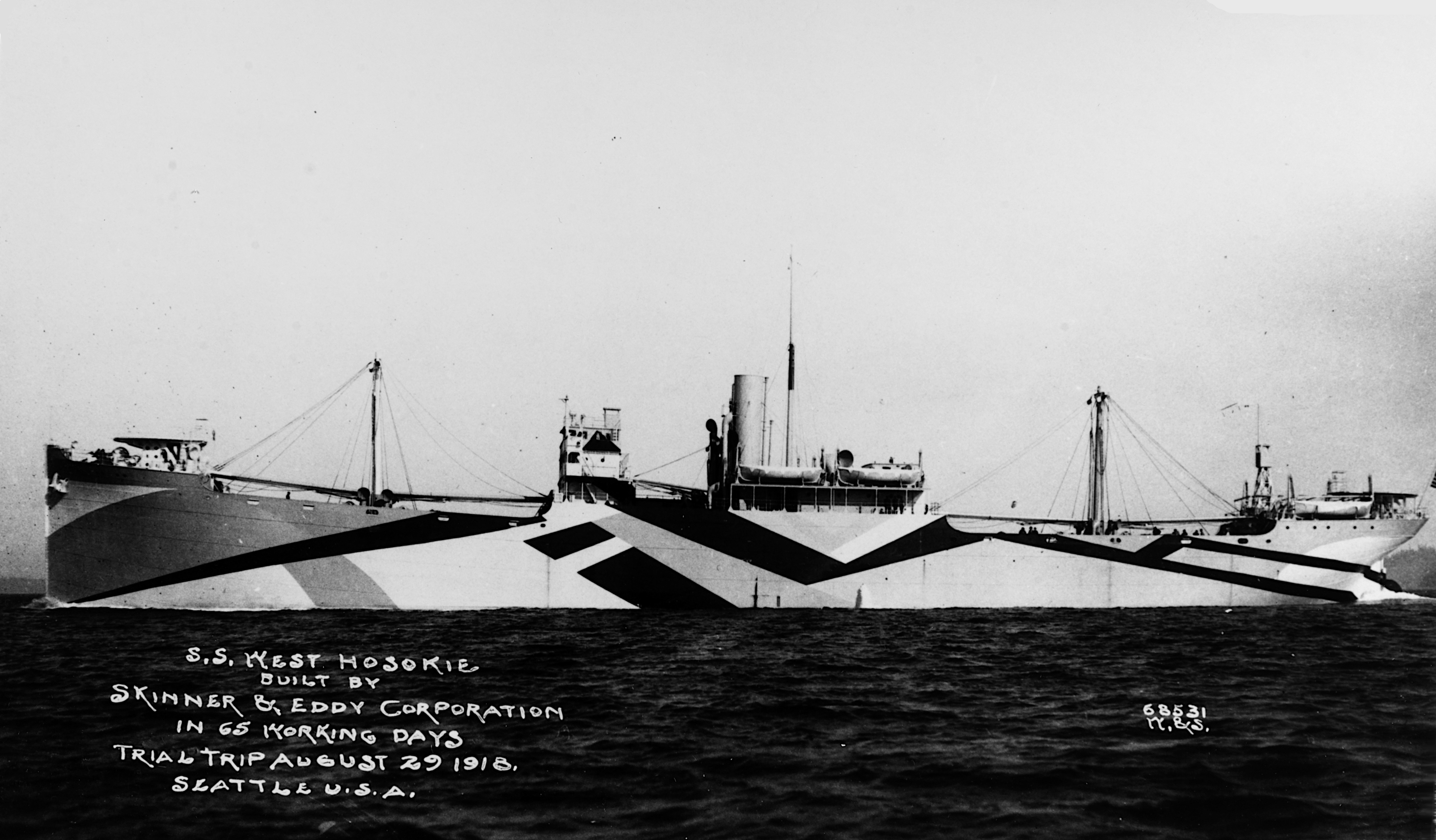
- A camouflaged SS West Hosokie on trials, 29 August 1918

History
- Name: SS West Hosokie
- Operator: 1918: U.S. Navy; 1919: U.S. Shipping Board; 1928: Los Angeles SSC; 1930: Matson Line; 1945: Soviet Union
- Builder: Skinner & Eddy
- Yard number: 29 (USSB #1182)
- Laid down: 11 July 1918
- Launched: 15 August 1918
- Christened: SS West Hosokie
- Completed: 29 August 1918
- Commissioned: 29 August 1918–2 July 1919
- In service: 29 August 1918–1955?
- Renamed: 1918: USS West Hosokie (ID-3695); 1919: West Hosokie; 1930: Constance Chandler; 1938: Liloa; 1945: Belorussia
- Stricken: 2 July 1919
- Fate: Scrapped, 1960

General characteristics
- Type: Design 1013 cargo ship
- Tonnage: 5,600 gross, 8,800 dwt
- Displacement: 12,100
- Length: 423 ft 9 in (129.16 m); 410 ft 5 in (125.10 m) bp
- Beam: 54 ft (16 m)
- Draft: 24 ft (7.3 m)
- Depth of hold: 29 ft 9 in (9.07 m)
- Installed power: 1 × Curtis geared turbine
- Propulsion: Single propeller
- Speed: 11.5 kn (21.3 km/h)
- Complement: World War I (USN): 70; Merchant: about 30

SS West Hosokie was a steel–hulled cargo ship built in 1918 as part of the World War I emergency wartime shipbuilding program organized by the United States Shipping Board.

On completion in August 1918, West Hosokie was immediately commissioned into the U.S. Navy as the auxiliary ship USS West Hosokie (ID-3695), and made several voyages on the Navy's behalf before decommissioning in July 1919. She then entered merchant service as SS West Hosokie.

In 1928, West Hosokie was acquired by the Los Angeles Steamship Company, renamed SS Constance Chandler, and placed into service as a coastal freighter on the west coast of the United States. By 1930 she was operating for the Matson Line, participating in the sugar trade between the U.S. and Honolulu, Hawaii. She was renamed SS Liloa in 1938.

In 1944, Liloa was turned over to the Soviet Union and renamed SS Belorussia. Belorussia was scrapped in 1960.

== Construction and design ==
West Hosokie was built in Seattle, Washington in 1918 at the No. 1 Plant of the Skinner & Eddy Corporation—the 14th in a series of 24 Design 1013 cargo ships built by Skinner & Eddy for the USSB's emergency wartime shipbuilding program. The ship was laid down on June 11, launched 54 working (65 calendar) days later on 15 August and completed on 29 August—a total time under construction of 65 working (79 calendar) days, putting West Hosokie into the record books as the fourth-fastest built seagoing ship of the war, and the second fastest ship (behind sister ship West Lianga) of more than 5,500 deadweight tons.

West Hosokie had a design deadweight tonnage of 8,800 tons and gross register tonnage of 5,600. She had an overall length of 423 feet 9 inches, a beam of 54 feet and a mean draft of 24 feet. The ship was powered by a Curtis geared turbine, driving a single screw propeller and delivering a speed of 11.5 knots.

== Service history ==
=== U.S. Navy service, 1918-19 ===
Upon delivery to the Navy on 29 August, West Hosokie was commissioned the same day for operation with the Naval Overseas Transportation Service (NOTS) as USS West Hosokie (ID-3695).

USS West Hosokie commenced her first voyage for the Navy on September 7, when she sailed for Arica, Chile to load a cargo of guano, which was duly delivered to New Orleans, Louisiana on 12 November—the day after Armistice Day. On 20 November West Hosokie departed for Newport News, Virginia to load a cargo of Army supplies earmarked for delivery to the U.S. Army in France. She then proceeded to Baltimore to load some additional cargo before departing for France on 15 December.

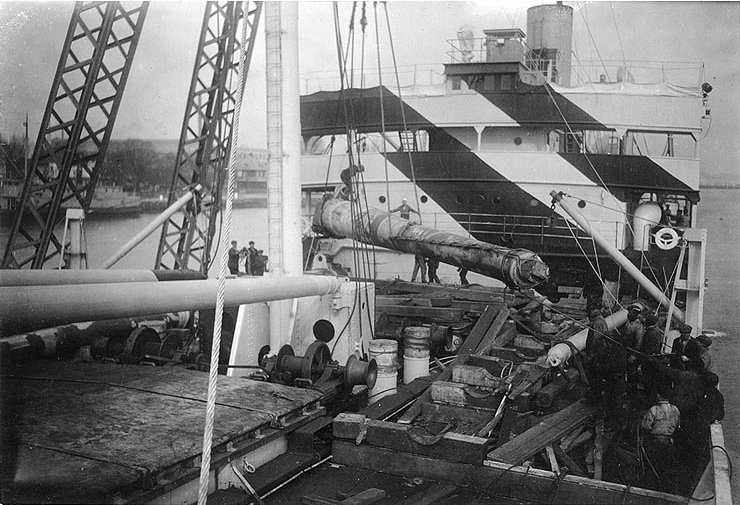
Unloading rail guns returned from France, March 1919.

After arriving at Le Verdon-sur-Mer, France, West Hosokie unloaded her cargo and shipped an Army return cargo bound for Philadelphia, United States, departing 14 February 1919. Pausing briefly at the Azores for provisions and fuel, West Hosokie continued on to Philadelphia, where she arrived 10 March. After discharging her cargo, the ship departed for New York, where more Army supplies bound for France were loaded prior to her departure once again on 10 April.

Arriving at St. Nazaire, West Hosokie discharged her cargo and loaded Army ordnance materials for the return journey to the U.S. Crossing the Atlantic once more, West Hosokie reached Newport News on 20 June. She was simultaneously decommissioned, struck from the Navy List and returned to control of the U.S. Shipping Board on 2 July 1919.

=== Merchant service ===
Following her Naval decommission, West Hosokie was placed into merchant service by the USSB as SS West Hosokie. Little is known about the ship's movements in the early 1920s, but she made a voyage from Antwerp, Belgium to New York in August 1920, suggesting she may have been engaged in transatlantic service.

On April 26, 1929, West Hosokie was purchased from the USSB by the Los Angeles Steamship Company (LASSCO), and placed into service as a coastal freighter on the west coast of the United States. Renamed SS Constance Chandler after the socialite daughter of LASSCO's founder, Harry Chandler, the ship would maintain a steady service well into the 1930s between west coast ports such as Portland, Oregon; Seattle, Washington; and Los Angeles, San Francisco and Balboa, California. She also made numerous voyages via the Panama Canal (where she sometimes ported at Colón) to east coast destinations including Savannah, Georgia, Jacksonville, Florida, Baltimore, Maryland and New York.

In 1930, LASSCO was taken over by the Matson Line, which maintained Constance Chandler on her existing routes. On 10 July 1932, about 50 miles off Cristobal, Panama, Constance Chandler caught fire in one of her cargo holds. The fire burned for 15 hours before being brought under control, after which the ship was towed 20 miles to port for repairs. Almost a year later, on 9 June 1933, the ship suffered a collision with the steamer Andrea off the Golden Gate, San Francisco. Constance Chandler escaped serious damage in the accident and was able to renew service a few days later. By 1934, in addition to her existing operations, Constance Chandler had begun making regular trips for the Matson Line to Honolulu, Hawaii, transporting sugar from the island's plantations to the continental United States.

In 1938, Constance Chandler was renamed SS Liloa, but continued to work for the Matson Line in her usual capacity. After America's entry into World War II in December 1941, no more information about the ship's movements appears in contemporary newspaper records, presumably because of a news blackout, but one of the ship's last recorded journeys was a voyage from Hawaii to Australia in January 1941 to pick up a cargo of wool.

== Under Soviet Union flag ==
On 13 January 1945, Liloa was sold to the Soviet Union, renamed SS Belorussia and commissioned to the Far East State Shipping Company. During World War II the ship was used for export and import carriages between Union ports and allies ports in Pacific Ocean. The ship was mentioned as a transport ship in Soviet Union Pacific Ocean Navy Fleet list from 9 of August to 3 September 1945.

She was transferred to the balance of the Black Sea State Shipping Company on 9 of June 1947. She was decommissioned, deleted from the ship's lists of Ministry of Maritime fleet of the USSR on 11 of April 1962 and transferred to "Glavvtorchermet" (Main organization for the Second use of Black Metals, - Mainsecondblackmet) for dismantling and scrapping. The ship was scrapped in 1968.

== Bibliography ==
Books

- Hurley, Edward N. (1920): The New Merchant Marine, p. 93, The Century Co., New York.
- Pacific Ports Inc. (1919): Pacific Ports Annual, Fifth Edition, 1919, pp. 64–65, 402–405, Pacific Ports Inc.
- Silverstone, Paul H. (2006): The New Navy, 1883-1922, Routledge, ISBN 978-0-415-97871-2.

Journals

- McKellar, Norman L. (1962): "Steel Shipbuilding under the U.S. Shipping Board, 1917–1921, The Belgian Shiplover, p. 479a, No. 89, September–October 1962.
