= Maykopsky =

Maykopsky (masculine), Maykopskaya (feminine), or Maykopskoye (neuter) may refer to:

- Maykopsky District, a district of the Republic of Adygea, Russia
- Maykopsky (rural locality), a rural locality (a khutor) in Rostov Oblast, Russia
- Maykopskoye, a rural locality (a selo) in Krasnodar Krai, Russia
