= Latvian Shipping Company =

Company based in Riga, Latvia

- Company type: Joint-stock company
- Traded as: Nasdaq Baltic: LSC1R
- Industry: Shipping
- Founded: 29 October 1940
- Headquarters: Riga, Latvia
- Area served: Worldwide
- Key people: Simon Richard Blaydes (Chairman of the Management Board); Paul Thomas (Member of the Management Board)
- Revenue: € 172 million (2008)
- Net income: ▲€ 40 million (2008)
- Owner: Ventspils Nafta (49.94%)
- Number of employees: 760
- Website: http://www.lk.lv/en/

Latvian Shipping Company (Latvian: Latvijas kuģniecība, Nasdaq Baltic: LSC1R) is a Latvian joint-stock shipping line. Founded on 29 October 1940, the company owns 20 ships, employing more than 700 seamen from Latvia. The total carrying capacity of the LK fleet is 957 974 DWT, and the average age of the fleet does not exceed 6.5 years. It is listed on the NASDAQ OMX Riga, and its main shareholder is Ventspils Nafta (49.94%).

== History ==
The date of the company's foundation is 29 October 1940, when the Latvian State Shipping Company was established by a decision of the Council of People's Commissars of the USSR. Its fleet consisted of 54 vessels. After the war, the Latvian State Navy had only eight ships. In the late 1950s, the fleet began to be renewed with new ships.

In 1961, the oil base of the Ventspils port began to operate, and the shipping industry began to specialise in oil transport. The fleet was expanded with tankers, reefers, gas carriers and container carriers. In the 1980s, the number of vessels reached 100; 90% of the shipments were oil and oil products, chemicals and liquefied gas.

On 29 August 1991, the state-owned company JSC Latvijas kuģniecība was established, which took over 87 vessels from the merchant fleet of the former USSR, mainly for the transport of oil and chemicals. P. Avotiņš became the head of the company. In 1996, Latvian Shipping was privatised. In 1998, A. Kļaviņš became the company's president.

On 5 June 2002, Latvijas kuģniecība became a public joint-stock company. On 26 June, Ventspils nafta acquired 49.94% of the shares of Latvijas kuģniecība in an auction on the Riga Stock Exchange. In 2004, three almost new tankers were purchased and 14 medium-sized tankers were ordered from Croatian and Korean shipyards. In 2007, four more medium-sized tankers were ordered from Korea. In 2008, Latvian shipping added 14 new vessels to its fleet.

In 2004, the privatization of the company was completed, and Ventspils Nafta became the largest shareholder.

In 2011, a new fleet of tankers was delivered from the Korean shipyard Hyundai Mipo Dockyard Co. Ltd.

In 2016, Latvian shipping operated with a loss of 21.156 million euros. In June 2017, Latvian Shipping's subsidiary SIA LASCO Investment sold the Preses nams building to SIA PN Project, which is managed by the Lithuanian real estate and private equity company Lords LB Asset Management.

In 2017, turnover of the company decreased by 9.1%, profit was 11.273 million euros.

In February 2018, SIA LSC Shipmanagement, a subsidiary of Latvian Shipping Company, which performed technical supervision of tankers, was renamed SIA LSC. In May 2018, the subsidiary company of Latvian Shipping Company SIA LASCO Investment became the property of Ventspils nafta. On June 20, Vitol Netherlands B.V. became the owner of SIA LSC. In May 2018, the subsidiary company of Latvian Shipping Company SIA LASCO Investment became the property of Ventspils nafta. On June 20, Vitol Netherlands B.V. became the owner of SIA LSC.

On 16 December 2019, Latvijas kuģniecība was merged into Ventspils nafta, which in turn was renamed Latvijas kuģniecība.
