= Baltic Sea Shipping Company =

Russian sea transport engaged in the business

The Baltic Sea Shipping Company or B.S.S.C (Russian: ОАО Балтийское морское пароходство, БМП) is a Russian sea transport engaged in the business of oil products storage via rail wagons within Russian link-able terminals, and tanker ship along the inland waterways and coastal seas of European Russia. The company is headquartered in Saint Petersburg and operates in the Baltic Sea. It was founded in 1835. In the Soviet Union it was the largest steamship company with about two hundred registered vessels. In November 1992, it was transformed into a joint stock company.

== History ==
=== Background ===
The Baltic Sea Shipping Company (BMP) traces its history from the Saint Petersburg- Lübeck Society of Steamships, founded in 1830.

On January 26 (February 8), 1918, the Council of People's Commissars of the RSFSR adopted a decree on the nationalization of the sea and river fleet, in accordance with which the Main Directorate of Water Transport of the Supreme Council of the National Economy of the Supreme Soviet of the National Economy was created. On May 18, 1918, to manage the nationalized transport (both fleets and all freight and passenger traffic in the Baltic), the Regional Directorate of Maritime Transport of the Baltic Sea of the Main Directorate of Water Transport of the Supreme Council of the National Economy of the RSFSR was formed. In February 1919, it was reorganized into the Baltic-Mariinsky Directorate of Water Transport, and in January 1920 - into the Directorate of Maritime Transport of the Baltic Sea (Baltmortran) of the Central Directorate of Maritime Transport of the RSFSR People's Commissariat of Communications.

=== Establishment of a shipping company ===
The date of foundation (and actually re-creation) of the shipping company is June 13, 1922. On this day, the Council of Labor and Defense of the RSFSR approved the "Regulations on the State Merchant Fleet of the RSFSR", which was the constituent document for state shipping enterprises. On the basis of this document, Baltmortrans (Baltic Sea Transport Administration) was transformed into the State Baltic Shipping Company of the Central Board of the State Merchant Fleet of the RSFSR People's Commissariat of Railways.

In 1924, the shipping company became part of the joint-stock company Soviet Merchant Fleet (Sovtorgflot) and was reorganized into the Baltic head office of Sovtorgflot.

In December 1925, the Leningrad city office of the North-West branch of Dobroflot, formed in 1924, was transferred to the subordination of the Baltic head office, which became known as the Leningrad city office of the Baltic head office. In May 1926, it was merged with the freight forwarding unit.

=== 1930s ===
By the decree of the Central Executive Committee and the Council of People's Commissars of the USSR of February 13, 1930, the joint-stock company was reorganized into the All-Union Association "Sovtorgflot" of the USSR People's Commissariat of Railways (since 1931 - the People's Commissariat of Water Transport), its Baltic office was transformed into the Baltic Administration of the Sovtorgflot (BUSTF), which in 1933 reorganized into the Baltic Directorate of Sovtorgflot (BDSTF).

On 15 March 1934, by the Decree of the Central Executive Committee and the Council of People's Commissars of the USSR "On the reorganization of water transport management bodies", the Central Department of the Marine Fleet (Tsumorflot) was established. On the basis of this resolution, Bumorflot was established in Leningrad.

After the Sovtorgflot association was liquidated in April 1934, the Baltic Directorate was reorganized into the Baltic Sea Fleet Directorate of the People's Commissariat of Water Transport. In 1935 it was transformed into the Baltic State Shipping Company (BSMP) of the USSR People's Commissariat for Water. On March 5, 1935, in accordance with Article 2 of the Decree of the Council of People's Commissars of the USSR of December 9, 1934 on state shipping companies, the Order of the People's Commissariat of Water Transport No. 99 approved the Charter of the Baltic State Shipping Company.

In 1939, the People's Commissariat of the USSR was liquidated, and the shipping company was taken over by the People's Commissariat of the USSR Navy. By 1941, the shipping company numbered 20 ships with a total cargo capacity of more than 84 thousand tons.

=== 1940—1960 ===
With the beginning of the Eastern Front (World War II), in June - July 1941, the ships of the Estonian (formed in October 1940) and Latvian Shipping Company were assigned to the shipping company. During the war years, the BSC, in close contact with the Red Banner Baltic Fleet, was engaged in evacuation, medical support, and the supply of military garrisons defending blockaded Leningrad. Many of the shipping company's employees joined the people's militia, soviet partisans, worked on the Road of Life and in the ports of Ladoga. In 1944, BMP flights were resumed within the Gulf of Finland, and then throughout the Baltic. By the end of the war, the shipping company had 24 vessels with a cargo capacity of 72 thousand tons.

In 1956 and 1958, on the basis of the units of the Baltic Shipping Company, independent Estonian and Latvian state shipping companies were formed, which later, according to the decree of the Council of Ministers of the USSR of January 27, 1964, were once again merged with the BSC. In January 1967, they became independent again. In January 1969, the Lithuanian Shipping Company was established on the basis of the Klaipeda Maritime Agency BMP.

=== The heyday of the BSC ===
In 1982, the BSC was headed by Viktor Ivanovich Kharchenko, who held this post for twelve years. During this period, the Baltic Shipping Company reached its peak of development. In 1990, it had three ports in its structure (Leningrad, Vyborg and Kaliningrad), a ship-repair base at the Kanonersky ship-repair plant, the Torgmortrans administration, an expeditionary group of rescue ship-lifting and underwater technical works (EO ASPTR), a repair and construction trust, nautical school and other departments.

The BSC fleet consisted of more than 170 large-tonnage cargo and cargo-passenger ships with a total carrying capacity of over 1.5 million tons, visiting more than 400 ports in 70 countries, passenger ships operating on sea, ocean and cruise international lines. The BSC had 18 cargo and passenger lines, and the ships went on schedule even to Australia and New Zealand. The total number of employees in the organization reached 46,000 people, including 15,400 - sailors on ships serving 18 regular shipping lines.

During the years of perestroika, the Ministry offered BSC an economic experiment, within the framework of which the shipping company was given greater independence in resolving certain organizational and economic issues. Thanks to the new opportunities in the BSC, the fleet of ships was significantly updated. The shipping company gained leadership in the Baltic basin and even began to dictate freight prices.

Within a year, the BSC launched the country's first wetsuit factory. They actively provided the sailors with housing, not only buying it from the city, but also building it independently (in particular, a record 750 apartments were commissioned in a year and a half). Joint-stock company Energomashzhilstroy was established jointly with eight largest Leningrad enterprises, where BSC invested 30% of the capital. A house-building plant with a capacity of up to 100,000 m² of housing per year was purchased in Italy. With the participation of foreign firms, a sanitary equipment plant for 3 thousand sets per year was built. Together with other Soviet enterprises and the Hamburg firm "Transglob", the shipping company built the first plant in the North-West for the production of containers for sea transportation, which had to be bought abroad earlier.

In the state farm "Agro-Balt" sponsored by the shipping company in the Kingiseppsky, a powerful complex was created: fruit and vegetable, meat and dairy, sausage factories. With the help of Dutch combines in the fields of the state farm, crops were grown up to 300 centners of potatoes per hectare, which were stored without loss in a new vegetable storehouse. Crews and coastal services were provided with fresh and high quality while the country introduced a ration stamp.

On January 13, 1990, the shipping company was reorganized into a leased company (from November 12, 1992 - OJSC) “Baltic Shipping Company”. Under the new conditions, the enterprise gained full economic independence, 50% of the earned profit was left at the disposal of the shipping company. At that time, contracts were signed for the construction of 18 new ships at the shipyards of Leningrad, Poland, Germany, in 1991 the passenger ferry "Anna Karenina" was purchased. The working conditions of seafarers have changed, their real wages have increased: a sailor began to receive $360 per month instead of 40. The queue for receiving apartments for the ship crew was almost completely satisfied.

The BSC's net profit from the sale of transport services in 1991 amounted to $571 million, and the shipping company deductions formed about 1/3 of the unified budget of Leningrad and the Leningrad region.

=== Post-Soviet period and ruin ===
In February 1993, V.I. Kharchenko, who was the head of BSC, was arrested on charges of major violations in the expenditure of foreign exchange funds of the shipping company, placed in a pre-trial detention center for 4 months, but then released on recognizance not to leave (the case was subsequently closed for lack of corpus delicti).

In the mid-1990s, the division of BSC began. Passenger ships and several dozen more of the best ships were arrested abroad for salary and loan debts and subsequently sold at auction, and regular ferry service between St. Petersburg and European cities was interrupted.

On June 30, 1996, Decree of the President of the Russian Federation No. 1004 "On State Support of the Russian Merchant Marine Fleet in the Baltic" was issued, instructing the government to take urgent measures to stabilize the operation of infantry fighting vehicles, protect the marine fleet in the Baltic and bring to justice those responsible for violations of Russian legislation on privatization.

Despite this, by the end of the 1990s, the BSC existed only formally and no longer had a single vessel.

Sergey Frank (Russian: Сергей Франк) was the supervisor at the OJSC Baltic Shipping Company (Russian: АООТ “Балтийское морское пароходство”), which was worth $2.5 billion, had 180 vessels, and was the largest shipping company in Russia when Baltic Shipping when bankrupt. (Note: Later, Sergei Frank was Minister of Transport from 1998–2004.)

=== In XXI century ===
On November 5, 2002, while Sergei Frank was Minister of Transport and after a meeting of former BSC director Viktor Kharchenko with President of the Russian Federation Vladimir Putin, the shipping company was revived and re-registered as Joint Stock Company Baltic Sea Shipping Company Holding Company (HC BMP LLC). The company's development program provides for the construction of 116 vessels for various purposes, 4 passenger ferries and large infrastructure facilities, which include a terminal in the port of Ust-Luga Multimodal Complex, a shipyard with a dry dock, the Lesnoye industrial and business zone in the Vsevolozhsk district of the Leningrad region, a mini-CHP plant and the modern headquarters of the shipping company, as well as the Baltic Interregional High-Tech Medical Center and a residential complex. The total cost of the projects is about US $8 billion.

== Website ==
- Baltic Sea Steamship Company's former official site
