= Fesco Transport Group =

Largest intermodal transport operator in Russia

FESCO Transportation Group

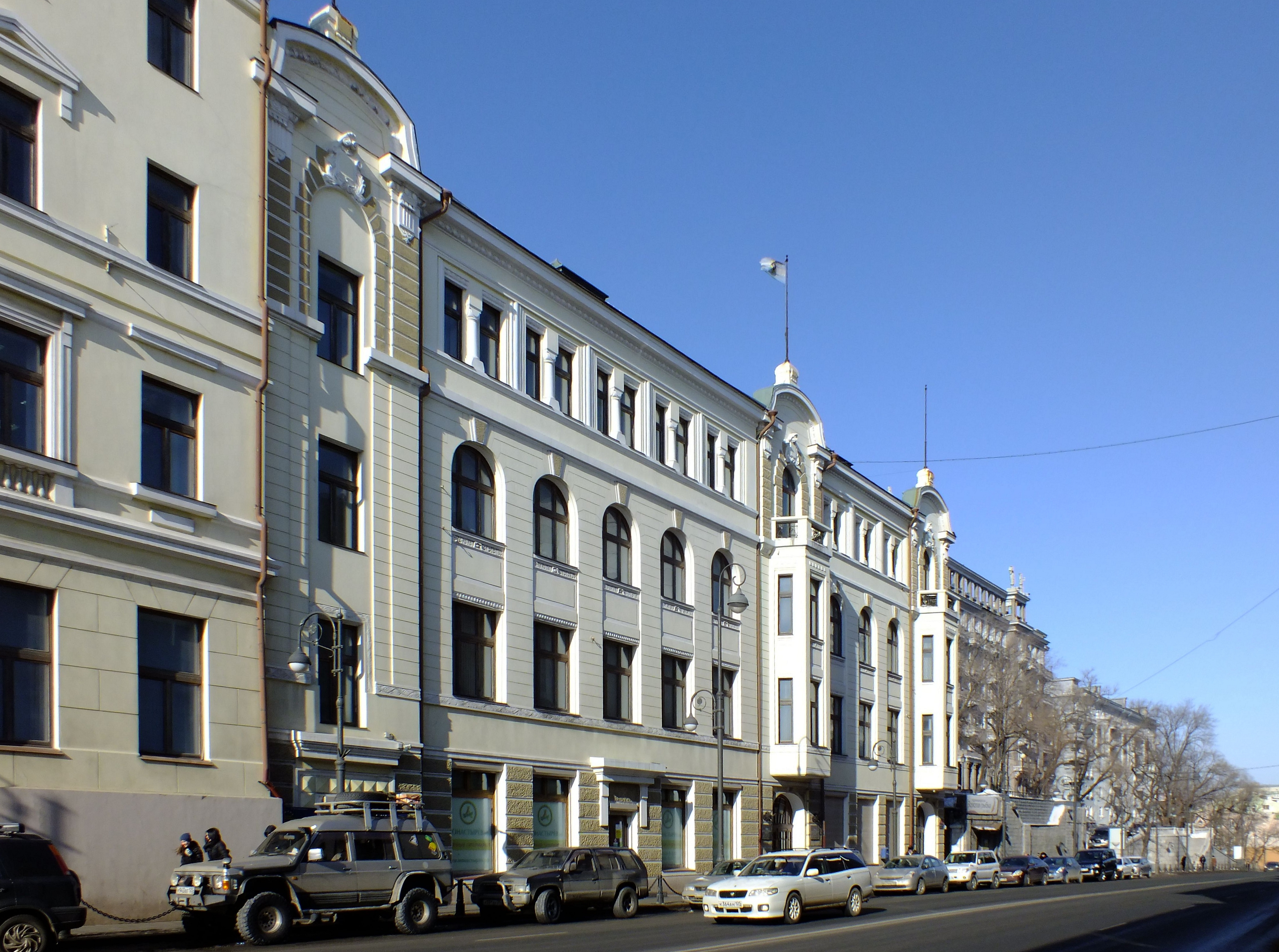
- Company type: Group of companies
- Traded as: MCX: FESH
- Industry: Transportation
- Founded: 1880
- Headquarters: Moscow, Russia
- Key people: Peter Ivanov (General Director & Chairman of the Executive Board)
- Revenue: ₽56,993 million (2018)
- Operating income: ₽8,334 million (2018)
- Net income: ₽7,009 million (2018)
- Total assets: ₽60,827 million (2018)
- Total equity: ₽3,176 million (2018)
- Number of employees: 5,000 (2019)
- Website: www.fesco.com/en/

FESCO Transportation Group (Note: "FESCO" is an abbreviation for "Far Eastern Shipping Company".) is an intermodal transport operator in Russia, which provides services, including marine shipping, roll-on/roll-off, rail transportation and port handling. The parent company of the Group is Far-Eastern Shipping Company JSC. FESCO Group is headquartered in Moscow.

== Share capital and management ==
The base company of the group is the Far-Eastern Shipping Company (FESCO; Russian: Дальневосточное морское пароходство, romanized: Dal'nevostochnoye morskoye parokhodstvo). The company was founded in Vladivostok in 1880.

FESCO is publicly traded as MCX: FESH. Current shareholding structure is: Mr. Magomedov – 32.5%; entities controlled by Mr. Garber (is one of the controlling shareholders of GHP Group) – 23.8%, TPG – 17.4%, other shareholders/Free float – 26.3%. The General Director and Chairman of the Executive Board is Peter Ivanov.

On 13 December 2012, Summa Group and GHP Group indirectly acquired 49.99% and 23.75% of the shares of FESCO, respectively. The acquisition was funded by a mixture of debt and equity. In December 2012, TPG joined in Summa Group's investment in FESCO, as a result of which TPG has certain rights in respect of oversight of the FESCO business and an indirect economic ownership interest of 17.5% in the Group.

== Business ==
The majority of the company's operations are located in the Russian Far East. FESCO operations are handled by five divisions, namely Port, Rail, Liner and Logistics, Shipping, and Bunkering.

== Cooperation highlights and joint ventures ==
The 100% FESCO subsidiary Transgarant and Russkaya Troyka (50% joint venture with the Russian Railways).

In 2011, the Bremen-based BLG Group and FESCO founded a joint venture for logistics for the Russian automotive industry.

== Gallery ==
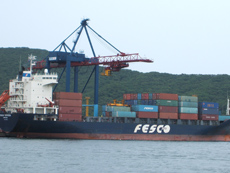
Fesco container ship in Port Vostochniy, the port at the Eastern end of the Trans-Siberian Railway

== See also ==
- MV Lyubov Orlova – ghost ship formerly owned by FESCO.
