= MS Mikhail Lermontov =

Soviet cruise liner wrecked in the Marlborough Sounds, New Zealand

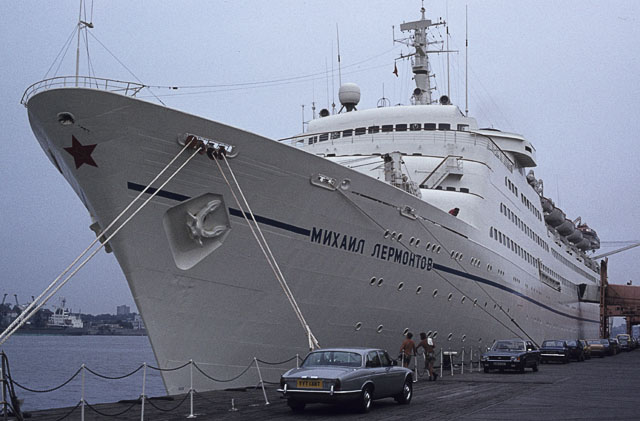
- Mikhail Lermontov at Tilbury in 1983

History

Soviet Union
- Name: Mikhail Lermontov
- Namesake: Mikhail Lermontov
- Owner: Baltic Shipping Company
- Operator: Baltic Shipping Company
- Port of registry: Leningrad, Soviet Union
- Builder: VEB Mathias-Thesen Werft; Wismar, East Germany
- Yard number: 129
- Launched: 31 December 1970
- Acquired: 18 March 1972
- In service: 21 April 1972
- Identification: Call sign UQTT; IMO number: 7042318
- Fate: Sank 16 February 1986 near; Marlborough Sounds in New Zealand. One crew member killed, cause of death unconfirmed.; 41.042087°S 174.219496°E

General characteristics
- Class & type: Ivan Franko-class passenger ship
- Tonnage: 19,872 gross register tons (GRT); 4,956 tonnes deadweight (DWT)
- Length: 175.77 m (576 ft 8 in)
- Beam: 23.60 m (77 ft 5 in)
- Draught: 7.80 m (25 ft 7 in)
- Depth: 13.50 m (44 ft 3 in)
- Installed power: 2 × 7-cylinder Sulzer-Cegielski diesels; combined 15,666 kW (21,008 hp)
- Propulsion: Two propellers
- Speed: 20 knots (37.04 km/h) service speed
- Range: 8,000 mi (13,000 km)
- Capacity: 1334 passengers (maximum); 700 passengers (cruise service)
- Crew: 347

MS Mikhail Lermontov was an ocean liner owned by the Soviet Union's Baltic Shipping Company, built in 1972 by V.E.B. Mathias-Thesen Werft, Wismar, East Germany. It was later converted into a cruise ship. On 16 February 1986 it collided with rocks near Port Gore in the Marlborough Sounds, New Zealand, and sank, claiming the life of one of its crew members.

== MS Mikhail Lermontov ==
MS Mikhail Lermontov, launched in 1972, was the last of the five "poet" ships: Ivan Franko, Taras Shevchenko, Alexandr Pushkin (later became Marco Polo), Shota Rustaveli and Mikhail Lermontov, named after famous Ukrainian, Georgian and Russian writers (Ivan Franko and Taras Shevchenko being Ukrainian, and Shota Rustaveli being Georgian), built to the same design at V.E.B. Mathias-Thesen Werft, Wismar, East Germany. Mikhail Lermontov, born 1814 and died 1841, was known as the "poet of Caucasus."

MS Mikhail Lermontov was originally used as an ocean liner on the Leningrad–New York run. However, the Soviet government realised that there was more money to be made by converting it to a cruise ship, and the accommodation and facilities on board were significantly upgraded in 1982 to meet the expectations of western customers.

=== Background ===
On 16 February 1986 Mikhail Lermontov was cruising in New Zealand for the CTC cruise company. On that day it left Picton for the Marlborough Sounds, carrying mostly elderly Australian passengers. The Picton pilot, Don Jamison (who was also a Picton harbourmaster), piloted the ship out of Picton. His presence, and his knowledge of the area, should have assured the safety of MS Mikhail Lermontov.

Hugging the shoreline to give the Australian passengers a good view of the area, Jamison continued towards the cape. About one mile from Cape Jackson, Jamison made the decision to take MS Mikhail Lermontov through the passage. A Russian officer questioned the decision, but the harbour-master assured him it would be a safe course, and at the time the decision was made the ship was still within the harbour limits.

Little more is known of the circumstances of the wrecking. Jamison retired in 2006 and died in 2025.

=== Disaster ===
On 16 February 1986, Mikhail Lermontov sailed from Sydney on the beginning of a two-week cruise around New Zealand, carrying 372 passengers and a crew of 348, which combined to a total of 743 people. On the evening of 16 February, Mikhail Lermontov was sailing past Cape Jackson, on the northeastern shore of New Zealand's South Island, about 30 miles (48 km) northwest of Picton. At 5:37 pm, travelling at 15 knots (28 km/h; 17 mph), Mikhail Lermontov struck rocks about 5.5 metres (18 ft) below the waterline on its port side.

By 8:30 pm, passengers began to abandon ship, with the aid of the crew and local rescue vessels. The passengers were transferred to several ships in the area, including the LPG tanker Tarihiko (Captain Reedman) and the SeaRail road-rail ferry Arahura (Capt John Brew). As darkness set in MS Mikhail Lermontov listed further to starboard. Within 20 minutes of the last passenger being rescued, the ship had disappeared completely, sinking at approximately 10:27pm, 4 hours and 50 minutes after running aground. The sinking resulted in one casualty, 33-year-old crew engineer Pavel Zagladimov, who went down with the ship. The coroner's report lists his official cause of death as 'unknown', as his remains were never found. Eleven of those rescued had minor injuries.

== Wreck ==
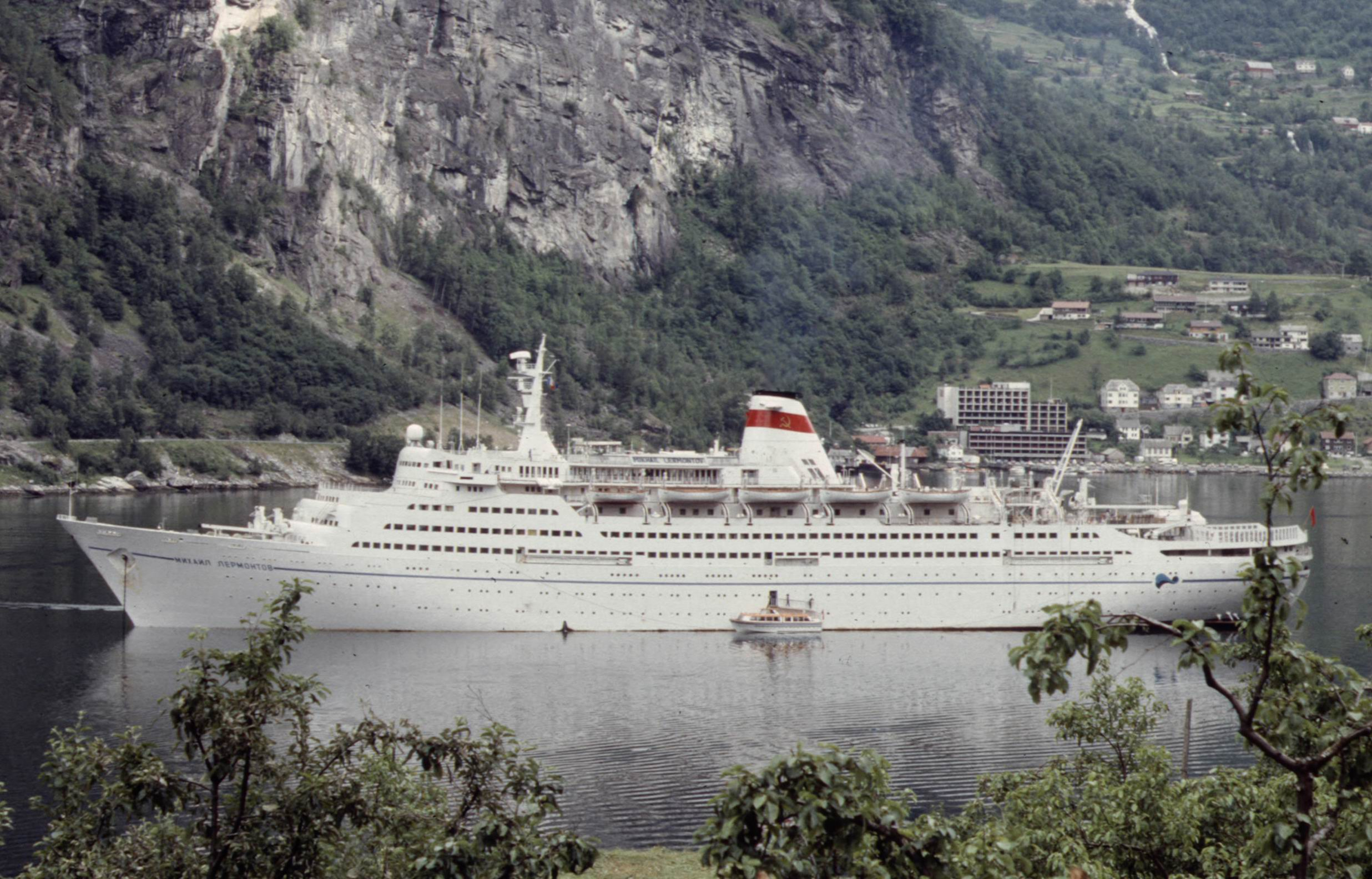
Mikhail Lermontov in 1984

MS Mikhail Lermontov rests where it sank, lying on its starboard side in depths reaching up to a maximum of about 38 metres (125 ft). It is popular with scuba divers and the site is served by local dive shops in Picton and Kaikōura. It is also one of the biggest, easily accessible, diveable ship wrecks in the world. The dives range from an easy 12 metres (39 ft) depth at the top of the wreck, through to deep penetration and decompression dives to depths of 36 metres (118 ft). It is possible to enter the wreck, especially in the open public areas accessible from the port side windows near the top of the wreck, although care must be taken and guides familiar with the wreck are highly recommended, especially for enclosed overhead environments and where entanglement hazards may exist. Closed circuit diving is recommended to avoid causing reduced visibility when entering enclosed areas such as restaurants, crew messes, and shopping arcades. Three divers are known to have died while exploring the ship, including one diver whose body is still possibly trapped inside.

=== Cause as established by New Zealand inquiry ===
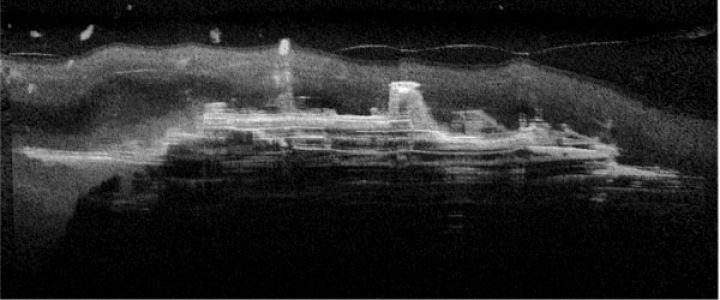
NIWA sonar image of Mikhail Lermontov resting on the seafloor.

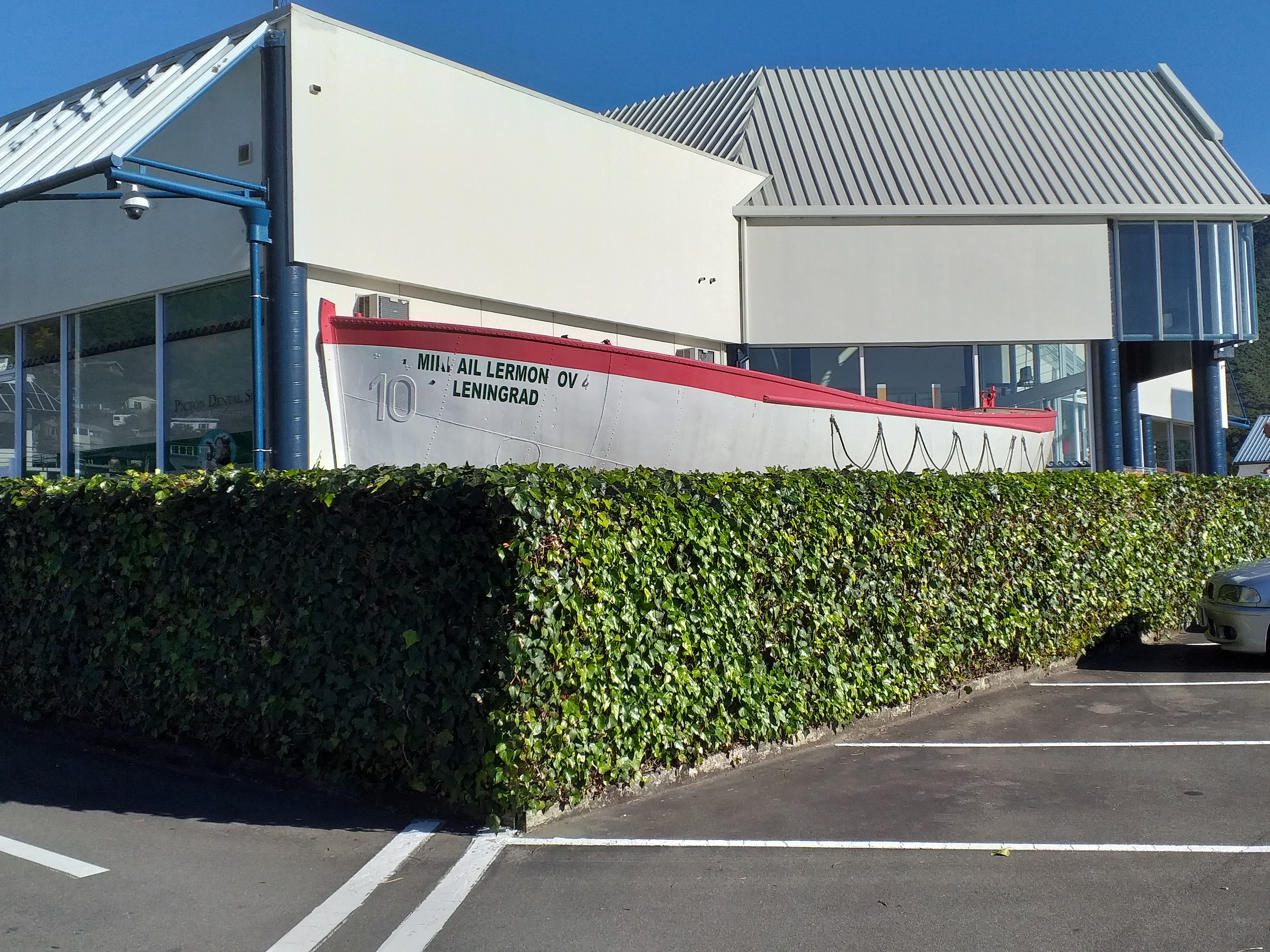
Mikhail Lermontov lifeboat No. 10, on display in Picton.

The New Zealand preliminary inquiry report found that; "at the time of the grounding the ship's courses and speeds were being directed by Captain D.I. Jamison in the employ of the Marlborough Harbour Board as Harbourmaster and chief pilot."

"The decision to direct the ship through the channel was made by Captain Jamison without consulting any other person at the time the ship was in position Lat 41˚ 01' 04" S Long 174 19' 30" E."

"When Captain Jamison observed the passage between Cape Jackson and the Cape Jackson light house, to open up, he made a sudden decision to navigate the ship through that passage."

The 1986 New Zealand Minister of Transport Richard Prebble later stated of the captain's actions, "why he decided to guide the ship over a passage that he actually knew was too shallow, I don't think he'll ever be able to answer."

=== Cause as established by Soviet inquiry ===
The Soviet commission of inquiry concluded that; "Pilot Don Jamieson took a decision which was not justified by anything and gave a command to steer the ship through the dangerous for navigation passage between Cape Jackson and Jackson Head which must not be passed through because of insufficient depths for a ship of such draught." Nevertheless, the Russian navigator, chief officer Sergey Stepanishchev was sent to prison for 4 years "with labor" and fined $US30,000 because he did not overrule the pilot. New Zealand Prime Minister at the time of the sinking, David Lange, called the sentence "totally absurd; it's an instance of totalitarian justice being meted out to a man who had no ... responsibility for steering the ship anywhere near Port Jackson. In fact, he'd been stood down in favour of Captain Jamison." As harsh as it may seem - "The presence of a pilot on board does not relieve the master or officer in charge of the watch from their duties or obligations for the safety of the ship"

== Court case ==
The disaster was the subject of the celebrated Australian restitution case Baltic Shipping Company v Dillon (The Mikhail Lermontov) (1993) 176 CLR 344, in which Mrs Dillon, having already been awarded damages for loss to both her possessions and person, as well as a pro-rata refund on her cruise ticket, claimed restitution for the remaining value of her ticket on the basis of failure of consideration. Rejecting proposed analyses of the cruise as an entire obligation, and alternatively as a payment conditional on performance, the High Court re-affirmed the rule that failure of consideration must be total in order for a claim for restitution to be sustained. Simply put, Mrs Dillon could not deny the benefit she received during her first eight days on the cruise. Furthermore, the court, following earlier English authority, held that full damages and complete restitution will not be given for the same breach of contract. The now-abolished forms of action cast a long shadow: a claim for money had and received evolved from the writ of indebitatus assumpsit, a legal fiction that the parties had an implied agreement that upon discharge for breach or frustration that the subject matter of the original agreement would be returned. An alternative form of action lay in debt. In Holmes v Hall (1677) 2 Mod 260, it was recognised that where concurrent claims existed and a claim in assumpsit indebitatus was available, the claim in assumpsit operated to exclude other claims. In the 'modern' language of Dutch v Warren (1720) 1 Stra 406, '[the defendant] has given the plaintiff an option to disaffirm the contract, and recover the consideration he was paid for it in the same manner as if it had never existed....but then the contract must be totally rescinded...;since otherwise, the contract is affirmed by the plaintiff's having received part of that equivalent for which he has paid his consideration, and it is then reduced to a mere question of damages proportionate to the extent to which it remains unperformed.'

== See also ==
- Baltic Shipping Company v Dillon (1993) 176 CLR 344
- Costa Concordia, Italian cruise ship which ran aground off Italy in 2012, in – possibly – roughly similar circumstances – close to shore, but, unlike Mikhail Lermontov, without a pilot on board.
- MS Sea Diamond
- MV Salem Express, Egyptian roll on/roll off ferry sunk in similar circumstances
