= Soviet ship Kalinin =

Three ships of the Soviet Navy have been named for the Bolshevik leaders Mikhail Ivanovich and Fedor Ivanovich Kalinin.

- Kalinin - an Izyaslav-class destroyer formerly named Prymyslav
- Kalinin - a Kirov-class cruiser
- Kalinin - a Kirov-class missile cruiser/battlecruiser subsequently named Admiral Nakhimov with the Russian Navy

== See also ==
One ship of the Baltic State Shipping Company was also named for Mikhail Kalinin

- MS Mikhail Kalinin - the lead ship of her class of passenger liner
