= Shipbuilding in Ukraine =

The Ukrainian shipbuilding industry began to develop during the time of the Cossacks.

== History ==
=== Cossack era ===
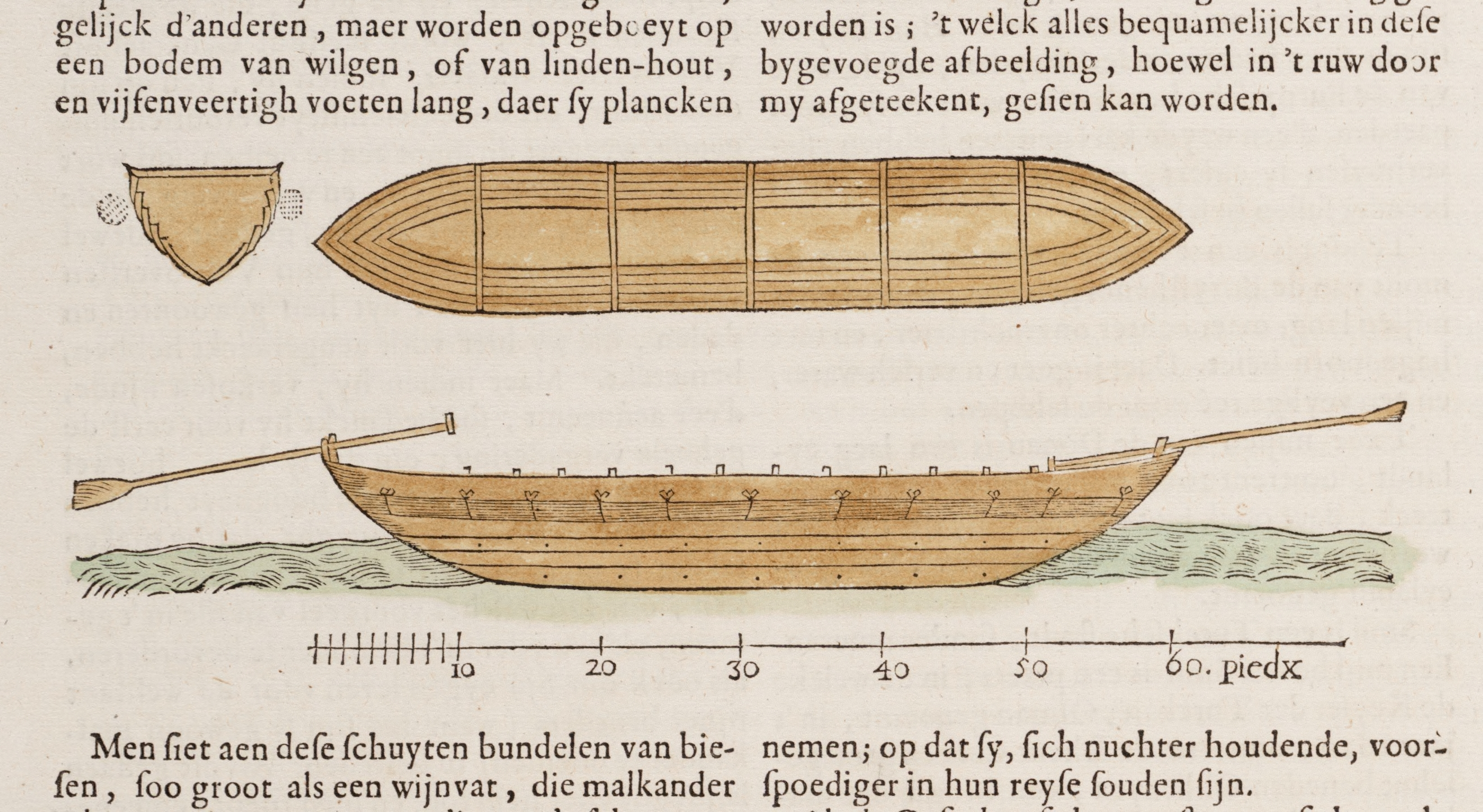
Illustration of a Cossack chaika from Description of Ukraine by Guillaume Le Vasseur de Beauplan (1664), with some commentary in Dutch

The most popular ships built were chaiky (singular: chaika) and large single-mast ships. As the sea was controlled by the Ottoman Empire, shipbuilding developed along the Dnipro River, where wood—the primary shipbuilding material at the time—was readily available.

Building a Cossack chaika took approximately two weeks and required the labor of about 60 people. The bottoms of the ships were made of willow or linden, while the hulls were constructed from oak planks. Cabins were built fore and aft to store provisions, ammunition, and weapons. A mast with sails was fixed at the center of the deck, and the boat was equipped with 20 to 40 oars on each side. These ships were highly maneuverable. They ranged from 15 to 22 m (49 to 72 ft) in length, with a height of approximately 4 m (13 ft) and a width of 6 m (20 ft). Each boat could hold between 40 and 60 Cossacks.

=== Pre-Soviet period ===
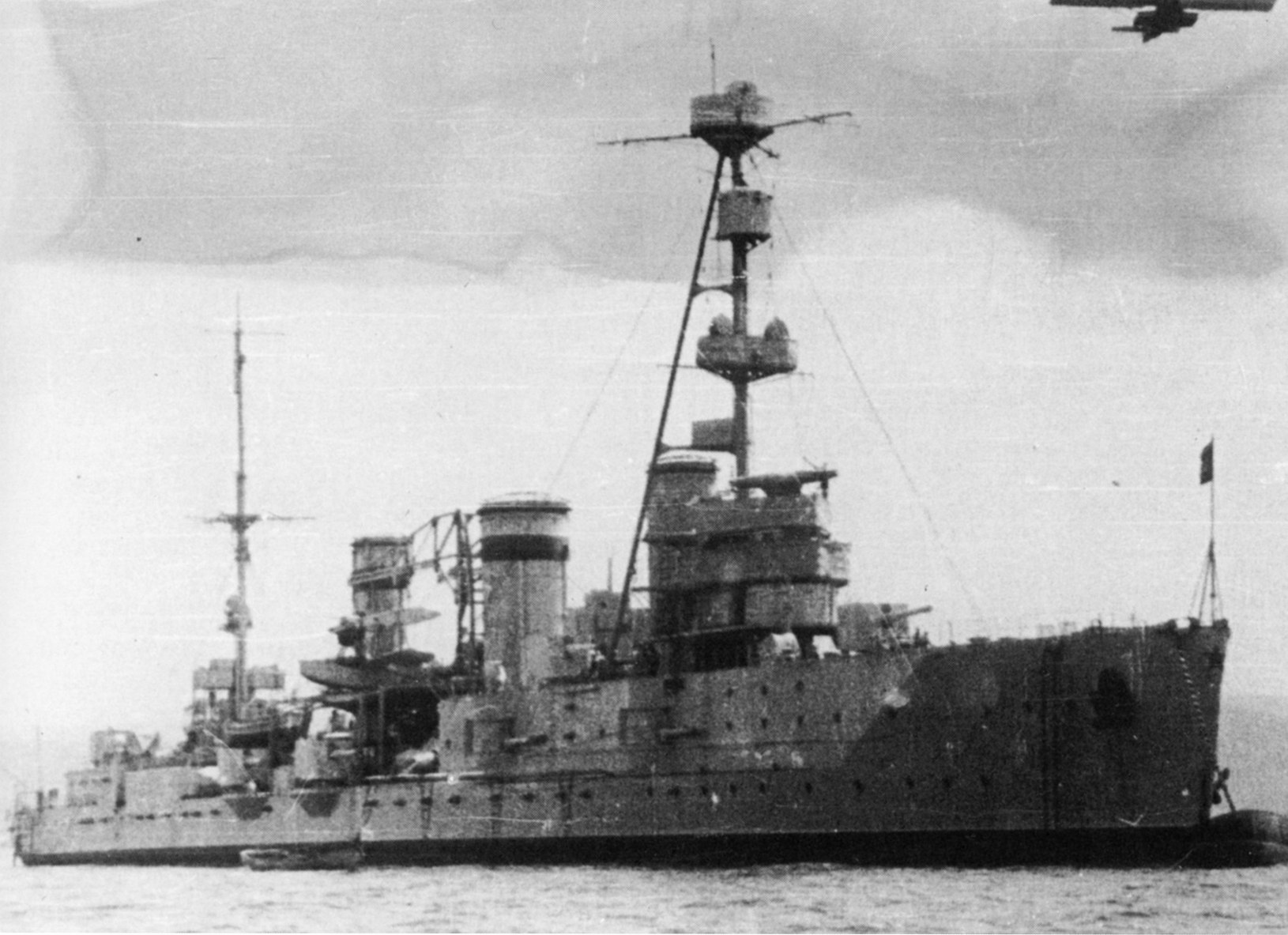
Cruiser Hetman Bohdan Khmelnytsky

The first shipyard for the construction of warships in Ukraine was built in 1788 in Mykolaiv. In 1862, a mechanical enterprise was established in Kyiv, which later became a shipyard (today known as Kuznya na Rybalskomu). Between 1895 and 1897, two shipyards were built in Mykolaiv. By 1913, there were seven shipbuilding and ship-repair enterprises in Ukraine, located in Mykolaiv, Kherson, and Odesa.

Shipbuilding in Ukraine developed further in the 1920s and 1930s. Between 1928 and 1929, the sector produced 14% of the region's total engineering output, and its significance increased within the USSR. Many new factories were built during this period, and older factories were reconstructed.

After World War II, destroyed factories were rebuilt and new facilities were constructed.

=== Soviet period ===
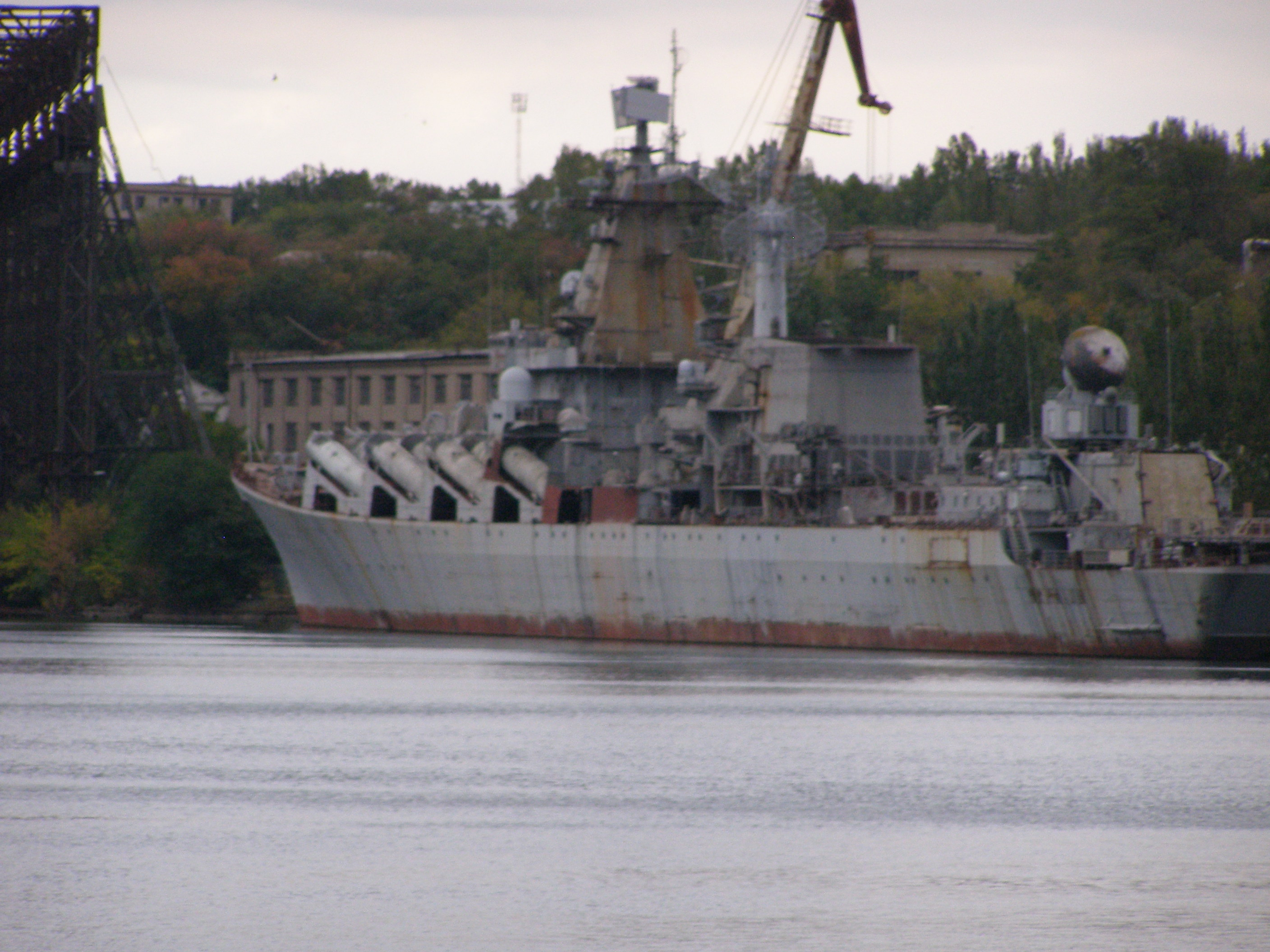
Missile cruiser Ukraina

In the Ukrainian Soviet Socialist Republic, major shipbuilding companies were located in Mykolaiv, Odesa, Kherson, and Kyiv. Smaller companies were located in Sevastopol, Zhdanov (now Mariupol), and Kerch. River ship repair facilities operated in Zaporizhzhia, Dnipro, Kiliya, Pinsk, and other cities. Outside the Ukrainian SSR, major regional shipbuilding centers included Tahanrih, Novorossiysk, and Tuapse.

The largest plants were the Black Sea Shipyard in Mykolaiv, the Kherson Shipyard, and Kuznya na Rybalskomu in Kyiv. The Black Sea Shipyard was formed in 1907 through the merger of two existing shipyards. It produced ocean vessels, tankers, and dry cargo vessels. By 1912, the shipyard had built the world's first minelaying submarine, the Krab, as well as the first turbine-powered destroyers in the Russian Empire. From 1957 to 1961, the shipyard built the whaling factory ships Sovetskaya Ukraina and Sovetskaya Rossiya, which had a displacement of more than 20,000 t (22,000 short tons). The Kherson Shipyard was built between 1951 and 1953 and produced ocean vessels, riverboats, and other ships. The Kuznya na Rybalskomu plant was founded in 1862 as a mechanical enterprise but was converted into a shipyard in 1913; it produces river vessels, sea fishing trawlers, and other craft.

Shipbuilding statistics in the USSR were not published, and there is no public information regarding the exact structure of military ship production at Ukrainian shipyards. It is estimated that by 1941, Ukraine was producing 15–20 military ships annually. By 1914, Ukrainian shipbuilding had focused mainly on military vessels.

=== Independent Ukraine ===
Currently, different types of vessels are built in Ukraine, including dry cargo ships, bulk tankers, drilling platforms, freezing fishing trawlers, timber carriers, seismic search vessels, and passenger hydrofoils. The proportion of military vessel production has increased significantly. There are also many ship repair companies.

In the first half of 2002, Ukrainian shipbuilding companies produced products worth ₴270 million. The improvement in the industry was largely due to restructuring, with the vast majority of companies transforming into joint-stock societies. Non-core assets were separated from plants and turned into independent economic entities. The factories divested themselves of social infrastructure (such as employee housing), which had previously required large maintenance expenditures.

Another favorable factor was cooperation between Ukrainian factories and European shipbuilding companies. In many cases, hulls were produced in Ukraine and then transported to Europe for final completion. Under this scheme, hulls have been constructed by plants such as Okean Shipyard, Zalyv (Kerch), and Kuznya na Rybalskomu (Kyiv).

However, many problems remain. A number of companies continue to construct vessels under previously signed unprofitable contracts. Plants experience difficulties in obtaining loans for modernization and suffer from a lack of working capital and low capacity utilization.

In 2006, Ukrainian shipbuilding companies produced products worth ₴2.3 billion. The volume of manufactured products increased by 11% compared to 2005. In 2007, 42 vessels were ordered for a total of $248 million.

Between 2000 and 2006, the Ukrainian shipbuilding industry displayed positive trends, and the media frequently reports on developments in the shipbuilding and ship-repair sectors.

== Companies ==
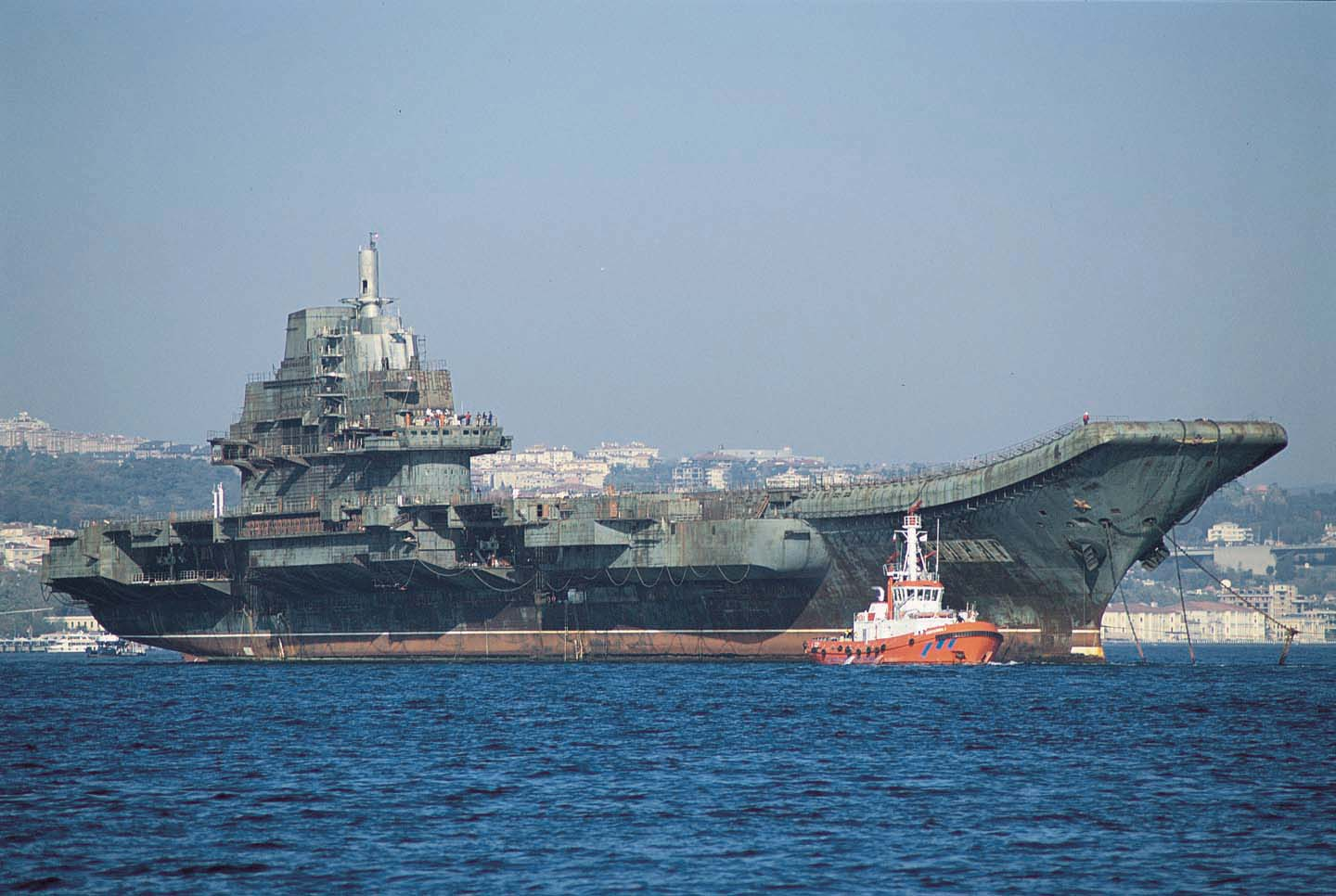
The aircraft carrier Varyag in 2001

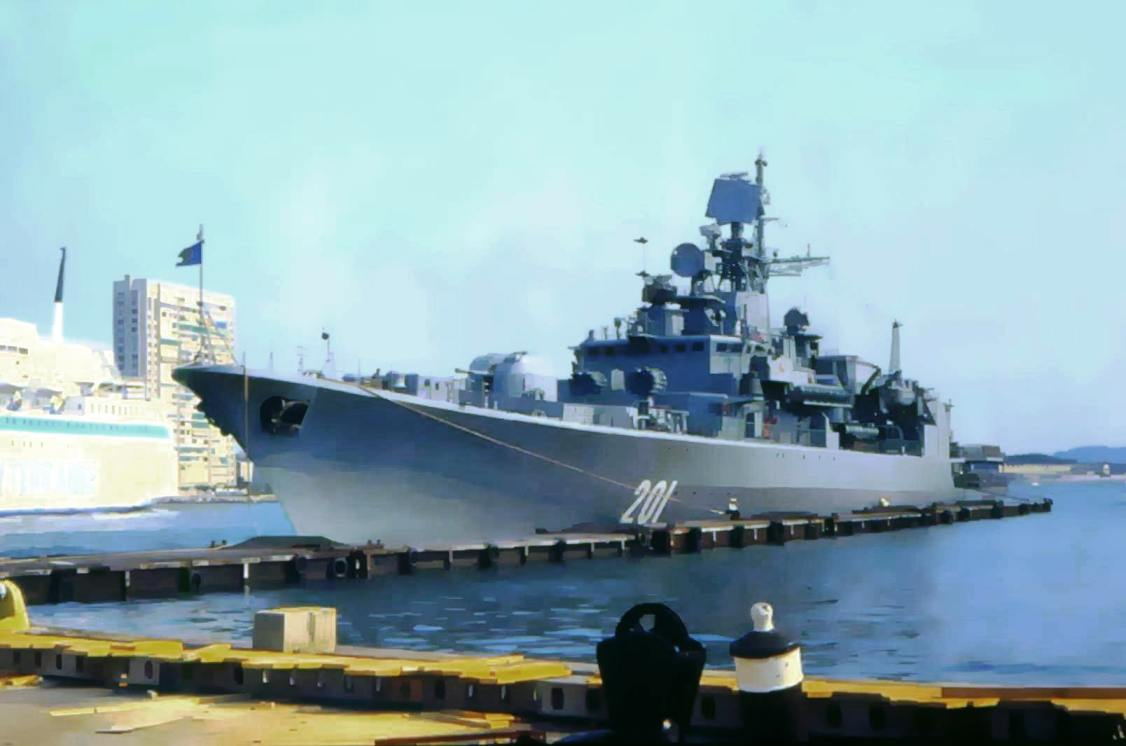
Frigate Hetman Sahaydachny, the flagship of the Ukrainian Navy

=== Shipbuilding and ship repair yards ===
- Kuznya na Rybalskomu (Kyiv)
- Zaporizhzhia Shipbuilding-Shiprepair Plant (Zaporizhzhia)
- Black Sea Shipyard (Mykolaiv)
- Mykolayiv Shipyard (Mykolaiv, defunct)
- Okean Shipyard (Mykolaiv)
- Nibulon Shipbuilding-Shiprepair Plant
- Kherson Shipyard (Kherson)
- Palada State Plant (Kherson)

The following shipyards are located in the Russian-occupied territories of Ukraine and are not controlled by Ukraine:

- Sevastopol Shipyard (Sevastopol)
- Zalyv Shipbuilding yard (Kerch)
- More Shipbuilding Yard (Feodosiya)
- Azov Shiprepair Plant (Mariupol)
- Mariupol Shipyard (Mariupol)

=== Design companies ===
- State Research and Design Shipbuilding Center (Mykolaiv)
- Zaliv Ship Design (Mykolaiv)

=== Engine manufacturers ===
- Zoria-Mashproekt (Mykolaiv)

== See also ==
- List of shipyards of the Soviet Union
