= Ivan Franko-class passenger ship =

Soviet ocean liner and cruise ships line

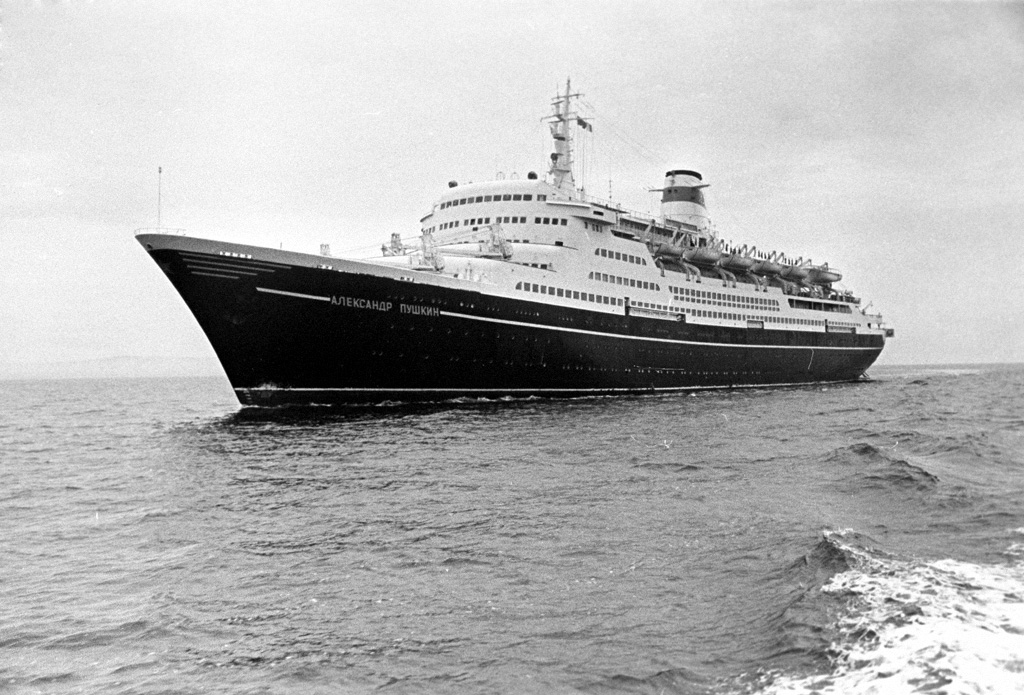
- Aleksandr Pushkin, 1966

Class overview
- Builders: VEB Mathias-Thesen Werft, Wismar, East Germany
- Preceded by: Mikhail Kalinin class (project 101/SeeFa 340)
- Built: 1963–1972
- In service: 1964–2020
- Planned: 5
- Completed: 5
- Lost: 1
- Retired: 4

General characteristics
- Type: Ocean liner → Cruise ship
- Tonnage: 19,861 GRT
- Length: 175.79 m (577 ft) overall
- Beam: 23.61 m (77 ft)
- Height: 16.19 m (53 ft)
- Draught: 8.11 m (27 ft)
- Decks: 8 passenger decks
- Installed power: 2 × Sulzer-Cegielski 7RND76 diesels, 15,666 kW (21,008 hp)
- Propulsion: 2 propellers
- Speed: 20.45 knots (37.87 km/h; 23.53 mph)
- Capacity: 750 passengers

The Ivan Franko-class passenger ship (project 301, in Germany known as Seefa 750) was a class of Soviet ocean liners and cruise ships, operated by the Baltic State Shipping Company (BGMP) and Black Sea Shipping Company (ChMMP or BLASCO). The five Soviet ships Ivan Franko, Aleksandr Pushkin, Taras Shevchenko, Shota Rustaveli and Mikhail Lermontov were constructed in 1963–1972 by the East German company VEB Mathias-Thesen Werft, in Wismar. The class was named after its lead ship, which took its name from the Ukrainian poet Ivan Franko. The last remaining vessel, the Aleksandr Pushkin – last known as Marco Polo, was retired in 2020 and beached in Alang, India for scrapping on 13 January 2021.

== Description and construction ==
The Ivan Franko class surpassed the earlier Mikhail Kalinin class as Germany's (in both parts of Germany) largest passenger ships after World War II. With a length of 176 metres (577 ft 5 in) the Ivan Franko vessels were 54 metres (177 ft 2 in) longer than the prior largest passenger ship, Mikhail Kalinin and its classmates. The Ivan Franko vessels were also 7.5 metres (24 ft 7 in) wider, and with a gross register tonnage of 19,861, almost three times larger.

The construction of this class featured some notable differences from contemporary ships built in the west. Among other things they offered cabins for six people and had three taps in the bathrooms – for hot, cold and sea water – Both of these features had been long abandoned in western liners. The ships also featured certain forward-looking features, such as all outside accommodation for passengers as well as the crew, and an indoor/outdoor swimming pool with a sliding glass roof.

== Ocean liners/cruise ships of Project 301/Seefa 750 ==
Ivan Franko class passenger ships
No.	Original name	English transliteration
1	Иван Франко (Frank)	Ivan Franko (Frank)
2	Александр Пушкин (Marco Polo)	Aleksandr Pushkin (Marco Polo)
3	Тарас Шевченко (Tara)	Taras Shevchenko (Tara)
4	Шота Руставели (Assedo)	Shota Rustaveli (Assedo)
5	Михаил Лермонтов	Mikhail Lermontov

== Overview ==
Ivan Franko class passenger ships
Year of build	Hull No	Image	Name	First operator	Port of Registry	Flag	IMO-No.	Status
1964	125		Ivan Franko	ChMMP	Odessa → Kingstown	→	5415901	originally, Ivan Franko; sold in 1997 to Polluks Shipping; out of service since 21 July 1997; scrapped in Alang
1965	126		Marco Polo	BGMP	Leningrad → Vladivostok → Nassau	→ →	6417097	originally Aleksandr Pushkin; scrapped in Alang in 2021
1966	127		Tara	ChMMP	Odessa → Monrovia → Odessa	→ → → →	6508195	originally, Taras Shevtchenko; out of service since 29 January 2005; scrapped in Chittagong
1968	128		Assedo	ChMMP	Odessa → Monrovia → Odessa → Kingstown	→ → → → →	6707753	originally, Shota Rustaveli; scrapped in Alang in 2003
1972	129		Mikhail Lermontov	BGMP	Leningrad	Soviet Union	7042318	sank on 16 February 1986 near Gannet Point (New Zealand)

== See also ==
- List of cruise ships
- Iosif Stalin-class passenger ship
