= MS Sounds of Orient =

Soviet cruise ship

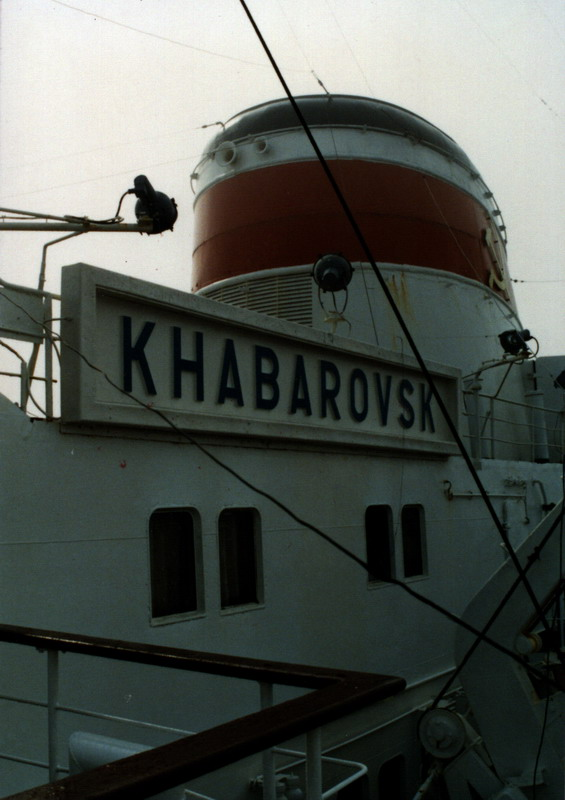
- Khabarovsk’s funnel, 1985
- Name: Khabarovsk (1962–1988); Sounds of Orient (1988–1989)
- Owner: 1962–1988: Far East Shipping Company
- Operator: 1962–1988: Far East Shipping Company
- Port of registry: 1962–1988: Vladivostok, Soviet Union 1988–1989: Panama City, Panama
- Builder: VEB Mathias-Thesen Werft, Wismar, East Germany
- Yard number: 113
- Launched: 12 July 1961
- Completed: 1962
- Acquired: 1962
- In service: 1962
- Out of service: 1989
- Identification: Call sign: UUYW; IMO number: 5186196
- Fate: Scrapped 1989

General characteristics
- Class & type: Mikhail Kalinin-class ocean liner
- Tonnage: 5,235 GRT; 1,358 DWT
- Length: 122.15 m (400.75 ft)
- Beam: 16.05 m (52.66 ft)
- Height: 7.63 m (25.03 ft)
- Draught: 5.22 m (17.13 ft)
- Installed power: 2 × MAN-DMR K6Z57/80 diesels, 6,192 kW (8,304 hp)
- Propulsion: 2 propellers
- Speed: 17.0 knots (31.5 km/h; 19.6 mph)
- Capacity: 333 passengers
- Crew: 134

MS Sounds of Orient was an ocean liner owned since 1988 by Crosby Corp. Ltd in Panama. She was built in 1962 by VEB Mathias-Thesen Werft, Wismar, East Germany as Khabarovsk for the Soviet Union's Far East Shipping Company. The ship was used for service between Nakhodka and Yokohama, Japan. It was named after the largest city and the administrative center of Khabarovsk Krai, Soviet Union Khabarovsk.

== See also ==
- List of cruise ships
