= MS Excelsior Neptune =

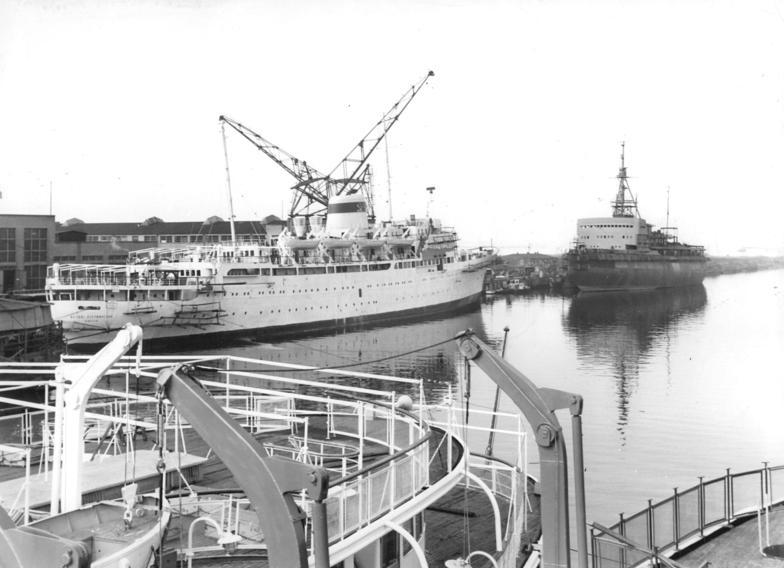
- Feliks Dzerzhinskiy and Krasin at shipyard in Wismar in 1958

History
- Name: Feliks Dzerzhinskiy (1958–1988); Excelsior Neptune (1988–1993)
- Owner: 1958–1970: Black Sea Shipping Company; 1970–1988: Far East Shipping Company; 1988–1991: Excelsior Third Marine Tpt. Inc.; 1991–1993: Excelsior SG Co. Ltd.
- Operator: 1958–1970: Black Sea Shipping Company; 1970–1988: Far East Shipping Company
- Port of registry: 1958–1970: Odessa, Soviet Union; 1970–1988: Vladivostok, Soviet Union; 1988–1991: Panama City, Panama; 1991–1993: San Lorenzo, Honduras
- Builder: VEB Mathias-Thesen Werft, Wismar, East Germany
- Yard number: 102
- Launched: 30 December 1957
- Completed: 1958
- Acquired: 1958
- In service: 1958
- Out of service: 1993
- Identification: Call sign: HQEV2; IMO number: 5113436
- Fate: Sank at shipyard, wrecked in tow off Canton in January 1993

General characteristics
- Class & type: Mikhail Kalinin-class ocean liner
- Tonnage: 4,871 GRT; 1,358 DWT
- Length: 122.15 m (400.75 ft)
- Beam: 16.00 m (52.49 ft)
- Height: 7.60 m (24.93 ft)
- Draught: 5.21 m (17.09 ft)16.00 m (52.49 ft)
- Installed power: 2 × MAN-DMR K6Z57/80 diesels, 6,192 kW (8,304 hp)
- Propulsion: 2 propellers
- Speed: 17.0 knots (31.5 km/h; 19.6 mph)
- Capacity: 333 passengers
- Crew: 134

MS Excelsior Neptune (originally, the Feliks Dzerzhinskiy) was an ocean liner owned by the Soviet Union's Black Sea Shipping Company. She was built in 1958 by VEB Mathias-Thesen Werft, Wismar, East Germany, as one of the Mikhail Kalinin series of ships. It was named after Felix Dzerzhinsky, a Soviet statesman and founder of the Soviet secret police (Cheka).

The Feliks Dzerzhinskiy entered regular service with the Black Sea Shipping between Odessa and Alexandria in 1958, and after 1970 she was used by the Far East Shipping between Vladivostok and Kamchatka, and from Nakhodka to Yokohama and Hong Kong. In the late 1970s she was also used by the CTC Line for Pacific Ocean cruises out of Fremantle and Sydney.

In 1988 she was renamed Excelsior Neptune, and was sold to Chinese interests in 1992. It was planned to rebuild her as a cruise ship, along with her sister ship Excelsior Mercury (formerly the Mariya Ulyanova), but she sank in January 1993 while being towed from Hong Kong to Guangzhou.

== See also ==
- List of cruise ships
