= MS Grigoriy Ordzhonikidze =

Soviet ocean liner

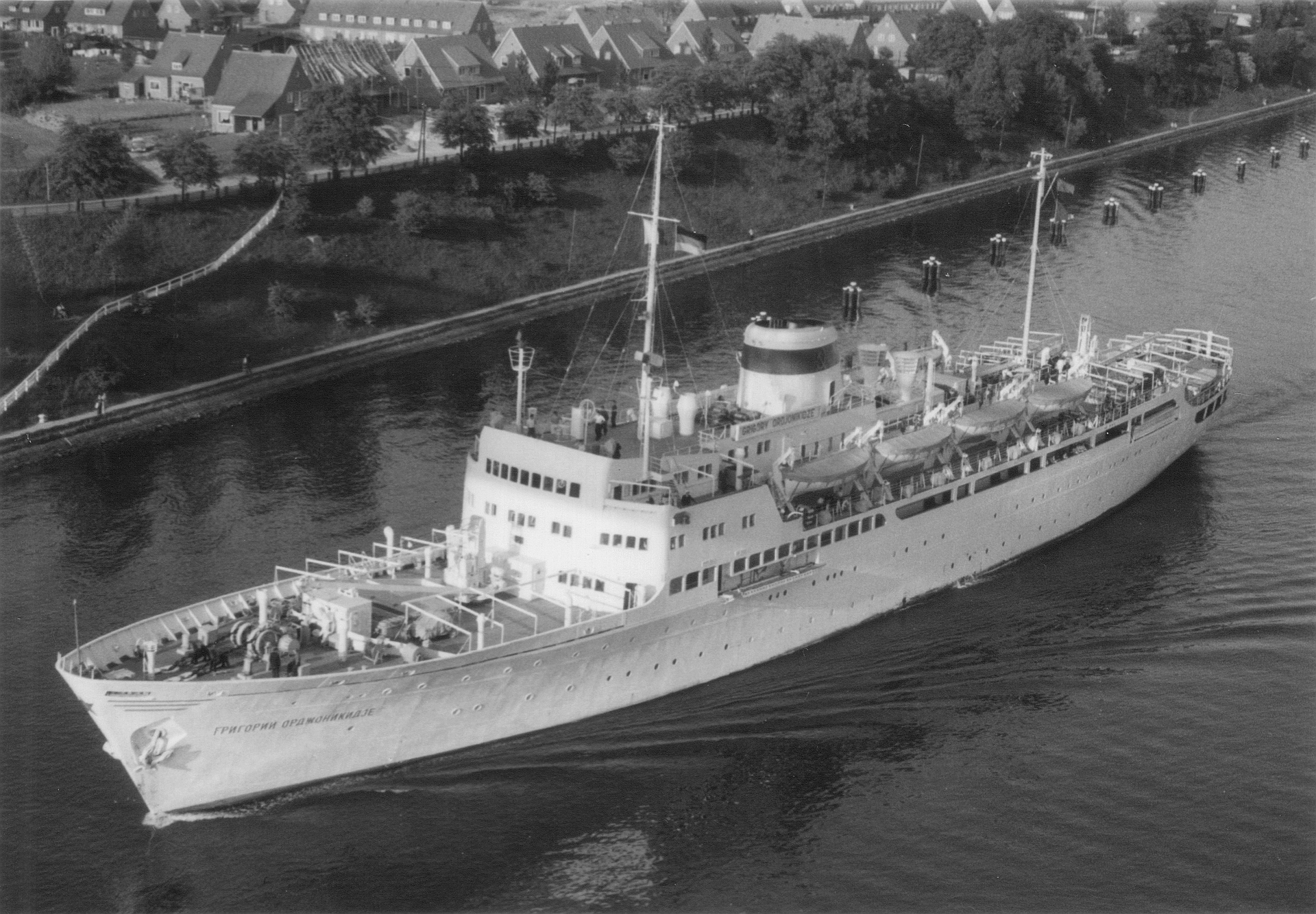
- Grigoriy Ordzhonikidze on Kiel-Canal in Kiel-Holtenau

History
- Name: Grigoriy Ordzhonikidze (1959–1992)
- Owner: 1959–1992: Far East Shipping Company
- Operator: 1959–1992: Far East Shipping Company
- Port of registry: Vladivostok, Soviet Union
- Builder: VEB Mathias-Thesen Werft, Wismar, East Germany
- Yard number: 103
- Launched: 30 June 1958
- Completed: 1959
- Acquired: 1959
- In service: 1959
- Out of service: 1992
- Identification: Call sign: UIDQ; IMO number: 5404677
- Fate: Scrapped 1992

General characteristics
- Class & type: Mikhail Kalinin-class ocean liner
- Tonnage: 4,871 GRT; 1,372 DWT
- Length: 122.15 m (400.75 ft)
- Beam: 16.00 m (52.49 ft)
- Height: 7.60 m (24.93 ft)
- Draught: 5.18 m (16.99 ft)16.00 m (52.49 ft)
- Installed power: 2 × MAN-DMR K6Z57/80 diesels, 6,192 kW (8,304 hp)
- Propulsion: 2 propellers
- Speed: 17.0 knots (31.5 km/h; 19.6 mph)
- Capacity: 333 passengers
- Crew: 134

MS Grigoriy Ordzhonikidze was an ocean liner owned by the Soviet Union's Far East Shipping Company named after Georgian Bolshevik and later member of the CPSU Politburo Grigory Ordzhonikidze. She was built in 1959 by VEB Mathias-Thesen Werft, Wismar, East Germany. She was scrapped in 1992 in Alang, India.

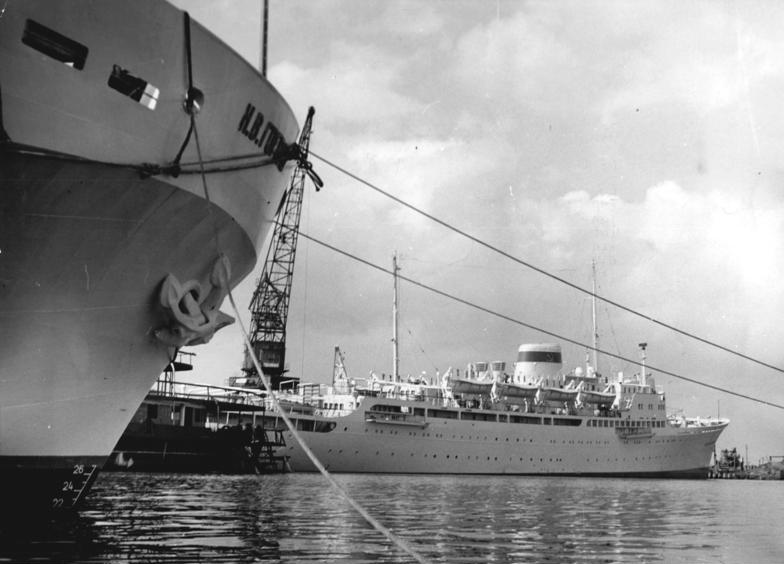
Grigoriy Ordzhonikidze at shipyard on April 9, 1959

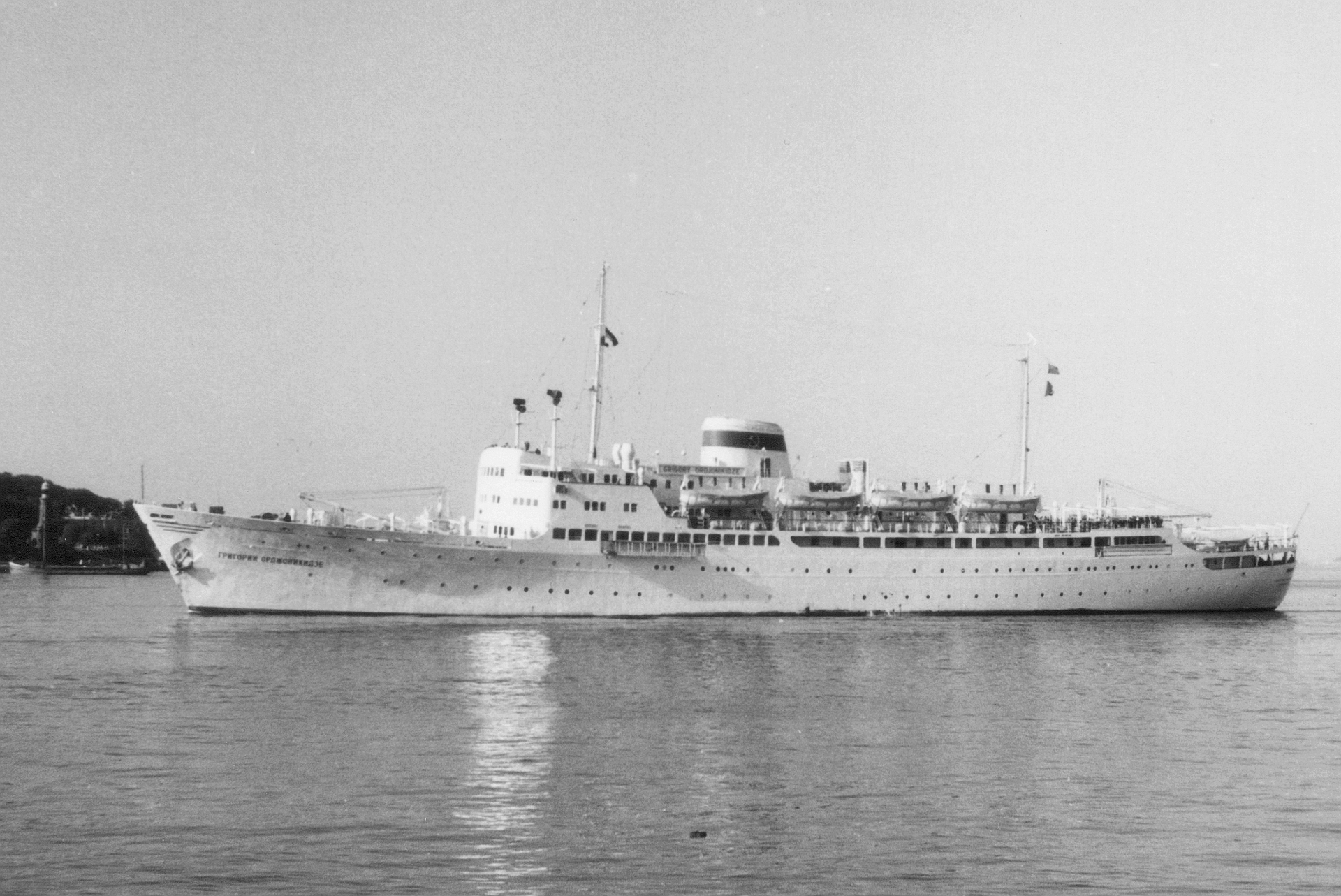
Grigoriy Ordzhonikidze at Kiel-Canal lock in Holtenau

== See also ==
- List of cruise ships
