= Kaalbye Group =

Ukrainian shipping company

Kaalbye Shipping International Ltd or Kaalbye Group is a Ukrainian shipping company which is mostly involved in the transport of military equipment.

== History ==
The company is headquartered in Odesa, Ukraine but officially registered in the British Virgin Islands. They have branches in other countries such as Belize and work in commercial, chartering and technical management of cargo fleet.

In May 1998, they obtained a Safety Management Certificate which permitted them to run passenger ships in compliance with the requirements of the International Safety Management Code. Annually Kaalbye Shipping transports more than 800,000 tonnes of cargo. In 2000 they purchased the MS Shota Rustaveli, built in 1968.

== List of ships ==
- 215613 – OCEAN FORCE Barge Carrier1983 Belize
- 9111216 – OCEAN VOYAGER General Cargo Ship1 St Vincent and Grenadines
- 9117753 – LS AIZENSHTAT Container Ship St Vincent and Grenadines
- 9179842 – OCEAN ENERGY Ro-Ro Cargo Ship Liberia
- 9179854 – OCEAN POWER Ro-Ro Cargo Ship Liberia
- 9512422 – OCEAN WINNER General Cargo Ship Liberia
- 9512434 – OCEAN FORTUNE General Cargo Ship Liberia

== Operations ==
=== 2008 MV Faina incident ===
On September 25, 2008, a ship named the MV Faina, heading to Mombasa in Kenya (with an alleged end destination of South Sudan) with T-72 tanks and other small arms and ammunition, was captured by Somali pirates. A ransom of $3.2 million was paid for the ship's release. Some sources have reported Kaalbye as the owning and operating company of the ship, though a call to the company could not confirm ownership.

=== Center for Advanced Defense Studies report and lawsuit ===
On April 11 2014, the Center for Advanced Defense Studies (C4ADS), a Washington, D.C.–based conflict research group, filed a complaint requesting a declaratory judgment and anti-suit injunction in the Superior Court of the District of Columbia against Kaalbye Shipping International Ltd, Global Strategic Communications Group (Kaalbye's public relations firm) and Peter Hannaford, senior consultant at GSCP, for shipping arms to Syria, China, Venezuela, and Angola. A report published by C4ADS alleges that Kaalbye Group is closely affiliated with powerful politicians in Russia. The report was cited in the Washington Post and other media.

=== Arms to Syria ===
Kaalbye has been accused of sending arms to Syria to be used in that country's civil war. Kaayble Group has disputed the allegations and the Washington Post would post a correction apologizing for supporting the allegations.

=== Iraq ===
In February 2018, in a legitimate arms sale, the Kaalbye-owned ship OCEAN ENERGY carried T-90S tanks from Ust-Luga in Russia to Umm Qasr in Iraq.
