= Port Gore =

Natural harbour in Marlborough, New Zealand

Coordinates: 41°00′S 174°15′E

Port Gore (officially Te Anamāhanga / Port Gore) is a bay and natural harbour at the northern end of the Marlborough Sounds in New Zealand. It is close to the northern tip of the South Island, at the western end of Cook Strait. It is directly west of the entrance to Queen Charlotte Sound.

Port Gore is the resting place of the 170-metre (560 ft) Soviet luxury cruise liner, the Mikhail Lermontov, which sank on 16 February 1986 as a result of attempting to navigate the narrow passage between Cape Jackson and the Lighthouse Rock. As a consequence of the disaster, Russian president Boris Yeltsin joked that New Zealand was the only country to get away with sinking a Russian ship. It is now a popular attraction as the largest fully intact wreck dive in the world and easily accessible at a depth of only 37 metres (121 ft).

In August 2014, the name of the bay was officially altered to Te Anamāhanga / Port Gore.
