= Wadan Yards =

Shipbuilder

Wadan Yards Group
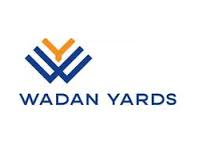
- Type: Aktiengesellschaft
- Industry: Shipbuilding
- Headquarters: Oslo, Norway
- Number of employees: 5000

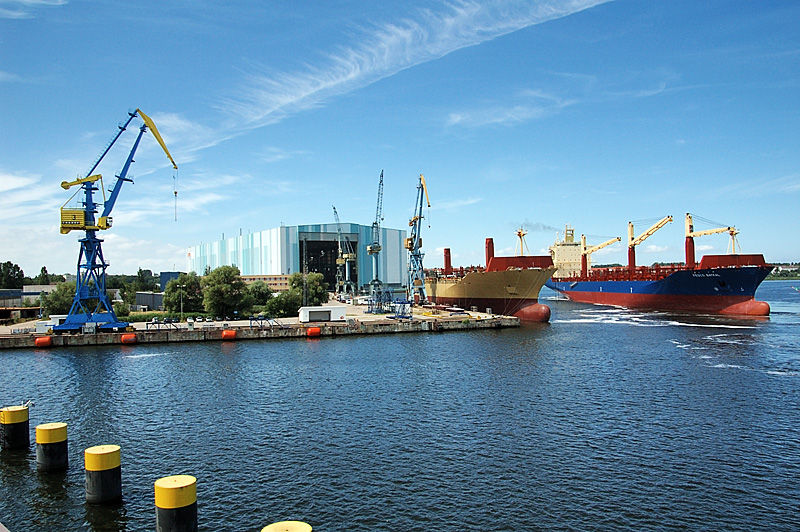
Wadan-Werft Wismar

Wadan Yards was a shipbuilding company that filed for bankruptcy in December 2009, followed by bankruptcy in March 2010.

The company was created by the sale of the two German shipyards in Wismar and Warnemünde and the shipyard in Mykolaiv in Ukraine by the Norwegian company STX Europe (formerly Aker Yards) to the Russian-controlled investment company FLC West.

== History ==
In March 2008, Aker Yards sold the majority of the two German shipyards and the Ukrainian shipyard to the Russian-controlled investment company FLC West, which is controlled by the entrepreneurs Andrei Burlakov (Russian: Андрей Бурлаков), Sergey Morozov (Russian: Сергей Морозов) and Evgeniy Zaritsky (Russian: Евгений Зарицкий). (The three shipyards were renamed Wadan Yards MTW Wismar, Wadan Yards Warnow GmbH and Wadan Yards Okean OJSC.) The three shipyards became part of the new company Aker Yards Ukraine Holding, of which FLC West held 70 percent and Aker Yards held 30 percent. The transaction was effective retrospectively from 1 January 2008, and since 22 September the shipyards have gone by the name of Wadan Yards. The purchase price was 248.9 million euros.

The agreements between STX Europe and FLC West included contracts for four container ships, to be delivered in 2010. The agreements also included an option for Wadan Yards on a 21.3-percent holding in the Finnish technology company Aker Arctic, in which STX Europe previously (as of 2008) held 71.4%.

The holding company, Wadan Yards Group AS, was based in Oslo.

=== German subsidiaries file for bankruptcy ===
On 5 June 2009, the company filed for bankruptcy. In the course of the insolvency proceedings, the shipyards in Wismar and Warnemünde were acquired by Nordic Yards.

On 5 June 2009, the German parts of the company (Wadan Yards MTW GmbH, Wadan Yards Warnow GmbH, Wadan Yards Warnow Real Estate GmbH, Wadan Yards LNG Technology GmbH, Wadan Yards MTW Real Estate GmbH) filed for bankruptcy at the court in Schwerin. The Schwerin lawyer Marc Odebrecht, a member of the law firm of Brinkmann & Partner was appointed as administrator. In mid- August 2009, the administrator succeeded in finding a buyer for the shipyards and their assets. The head of the Moscow Nordstream office, Witali Jussufow (Russian: Виталий Юсуфов, Vitaly Yusufov), the son of the former Russian Minister of Energy and Gazprom board chairman Igor Jussufow (Russian: Игорь Юсуфов, Igor Yusufov) acquired the shipyards for approx. 40.5 million euros via the Nordic Yards vehicle created by him. The creditors' committee approved the purchase retrospectively from 17 August 2009. Yusufov announced that he would retain half the 2500 workforce. He issued a job guarantee for 1200 employees. Following the sale of all assets, the insolvent companies of the German Wadan Yards are now a legal shell without content, via which Wadan creditors' claims are to be settled.

=== Legal challenges to the transfer of the Ukrainian shipyard ===
The Ukrainian shipyard was transferred to different companies in the weeks before konkursåpning (bankruptcy proceedings, in March 2010), and eventually was transferred to a company in the British Virgin Isles—Dartwell. (Templestowe Trading Corp hired the lawyers that transferred the Ukrainian shipyard.)

Johan Ratvik was appointed administrator, and he asked Økokrim and the Oslo Police District to investigate for bounndragelse (withholding assets from the estate).

The estate of the bankrupted Norwegian company (konkursboet) made a deal with Kostjantin Zjevago: Zjevago acquired claims of 50 million euro that the bankrupted company has against the Ukrainian shipyard, in addition to Zjevago receiving the shares in Okean—the company that owned 98.7% of the Ukrainian shipyard. If Zjevago is successful in recouping the assets, then the bankrupted estate will get a share of that.

In a spring of 2012 press release Tom Einertsen announced Zjevago's lawsuit, saying "The transfer of shares and loans were part of an operation to withhold (unndra) great assets from creditors. The transfers were illegal. Our goal is to get the shipyard back." Zjevago has sued, in Amsterdam, five companies and a Swiss lawyer. In New York, Zjevago initiated a discovery court process, to demand access to the documentation of a U.S. law firm that assisted in transferring the ownership of the shipyard, to companies—first in the British Virgin Isles, then Panama, then Netherlands, and then back again to the British Virgin Isles. Court hearings in New York are scheduled to proceed in July 2013.

=== Allegations of money laundering ===
On 29 September 2011 the former owner of the company, Andrey Burlakov was murdered in a restaurant in Moscow.

A 2013 article in Dagens Næringsliv reported what Aleks Bezborodov (one of Russia's best known shipping analysts) has said to InfraNews: "Andrej Burlakov was the first Russian to buy a shipbuilding company abroad. Only a crazy man would have bought a shipbuilding company without the consent of the [Russian] government. It looked more like an attempt at laundering money, rather than a reell investment. Clearly someone wanted to hide the trail of government money that had vanished."

The article in Dagens Næringsliv reported what the well-known Russian investigative journalist Roman Sjlejnov said: "Neither the Germans or the Norwegians asked critical questions about where the money came from. That is odd. Then when things went wrong, everyone started looking for scapegoats".

The article in Dagens Næringsliv said that "today there still is nobody who will tell where the mysterious Templestowe Trading Corp got the nearly 200 million Euro it borrowed to buy the three Aker Yards shipyards in 2008".

== Organization ==
In addition to three shipyards, the company also includes the engineering company Wadan Yards Engineering Rostock GmbH, formerly Warnow Design GmbH, Wadan Yards Engineering Nikolaev CJSC, formerly Aker Yards Design Ukraine, and Wadan Yards LNG Technology GmbH, formerly Aker Yards LNG Technik GmbH (before that Aker Yards LNG Unit) registered in Warnemünde, and the site management companies in Germany Wadan Yards Warnemünde Real Estate GmbH and Wadan Yards MTW Real Estate GmbH.
