= Blue Dream Melody =

Cruise ship built in 2002

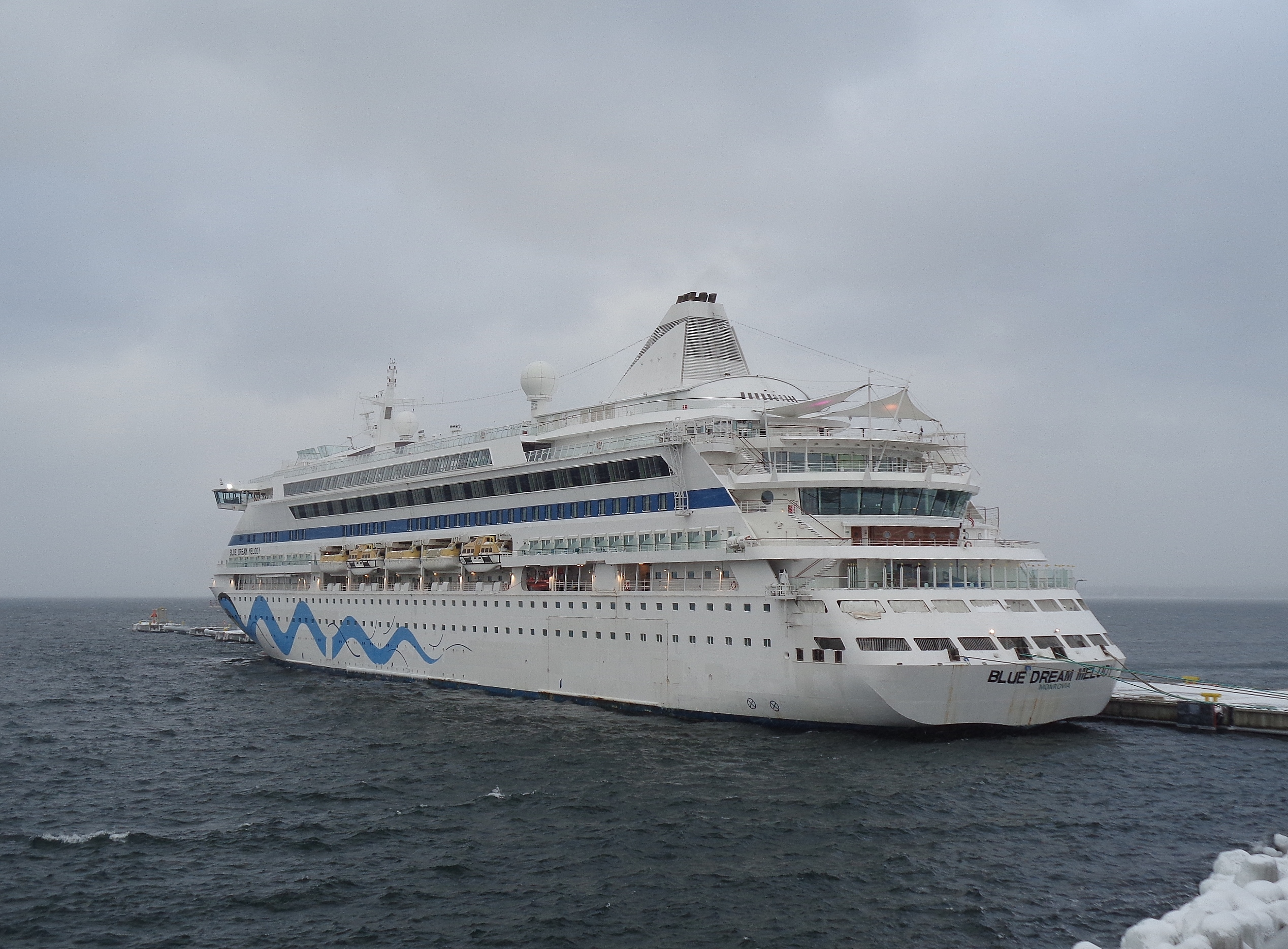
- Blue Dream Melody (with the image of AIDA Cruises) at Pier 26 in Port of Tallinn (January 2024)

History
- Name: 2002–2023: AIDAvita; 2023–2024: Avitak; 2024: Blue Dream Melody
- Owner: 2002–2022: Carnival Corporation; 2023–2024: Beta Marine Ltd.; 2024: Blue Dream Cruises
- Operator: 2002–2022: AIDA Cruises; 2024: Blue Dream Cruises
- Port of registry: 2002–2004: London, United Kingdom; 2004–2023: Genoa, Italy; 2023: Madeira, Portugal; 2023–present: Monrovia, Liberia
- Builder: Aker MTW, Wismar, Germany
- Cost: $350 million
- Yard number: 3
- Laid down: 21 November 2000
- Launched: 15 November 2001
- Completed: 30 April 2002
- In service: 2002–present
- Out of service: 2020
- Identification: Call sign: 5LKV2; IMO number: 9221554; MMSI number: 636022869; DNV ID: G94690
- Status: In Service

General characteristics
- Type: Cruise ship
- Tonnage: 42,289 GT; 20,877 NT; 4,232 DWT
- Length: 202.85 m (665 ft 6 in)
- Beam: 35.5 m (116 ft 6 in)
- Draught: 6.3 m (20 ft 8 in)
- Decks: 10
- Installed power: 18,800 kW (25,200 hp)
- Propulsion: 2 × diesel-electric motors
- Speed: 21 knots (39 km/h; 24 mph)
- Capacity: 1,266 passengers
- Crew: 426

AIDAvita is a cruise ship, built by Aker MTW at Wismar, Germany in 2002 and was operated by AIDA Cruises until the COVID-19 pandemic. In 2022 she was sold to Turkish buyers and renamed Avitak, remaining laid up, and resold in 2024 for operation by Chinese line, Blue Dream International Cruise.

== History ==
AIDAvita was the second ship in AIDA Cruises' fleet, and identical to AIDAaura. She was built in 2002 by the German shipyard Aker MTW in Wismar.

Out of service during the COVID-19 pandemic, she was laid up at Tallinn, Estonia in November 2021. In June 2022, AIDA Cruises announced that the ship would not return to service for AIDA Cruises and had been sold to an undisclosed buyer. Later, she was renamed Avitak but remained laid up in Tallinn, Estonia. and listed as owned by Beta Marine Ltd. of Majuro, Marshall Islands, and managed by Istanbul-based Sealife Denizcilik Ltd. Sti.

In January 2024, the ship was sold to China Development Bank, Hong Kong for lease to Chinese operator Blue Dream International Cruise of Shanghai. he ship was renamed Blue Dream Melody and entered service after refurbishment in China. The ship arrived in March 2024 in China. In December 2025 it was impounded in Beihai over unpaid fuel bills.
