= MS Siritara Ocean Queen =

German-built cruise ship

Coordinates: 13.681111°N 100.521389°E

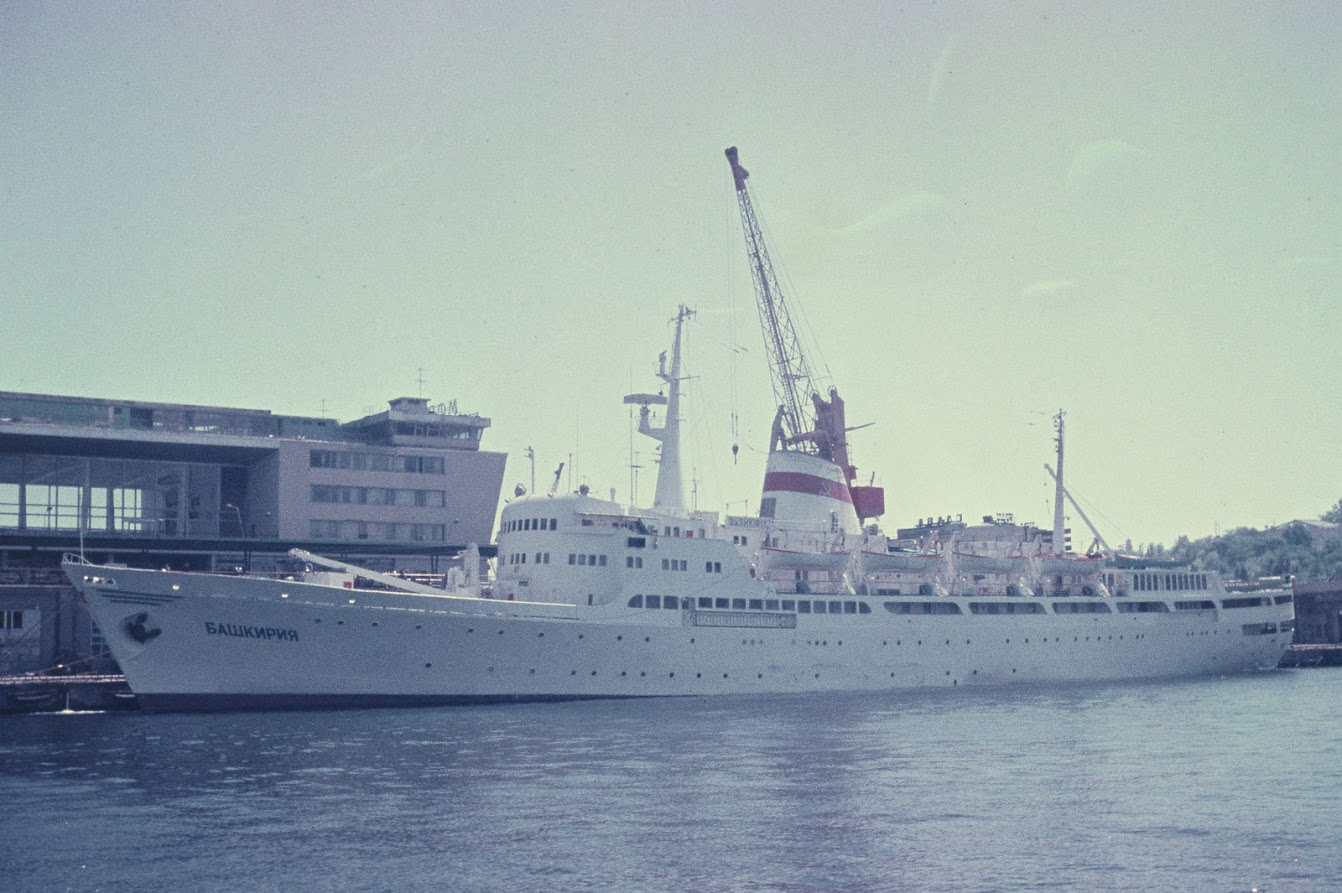
- Bashkiriya at quay 19 in Port of Odessa
- Name: Bashkiriya (1964–1992); Odessa Song (1992–1997); Royal Dream (1997–1998); Silver Star (1998–2003); Nandini (2003–2003); Olviara (2003–2004); Ocean Princess (2004–2006); Siritara Ocean Queen (2006–)
- Owner: 1964–1992: Black Sea Shipping Company; 2006– : Siritara Enterprise
- Operator: 1964–1992: Black Sea Shipping Company; 2006– :Siritara Enterprise
- Port of registry: 1964–1992: Odessa, Soviet Union; 1998–2003: Valletta, Malta; 2003–2004: Panama City, Panama; 2006–: Bangkok, Thailand
- Builder: VEB Mathias-Thesen Werft, Wismar, East Germany
- Yard number: 118
- Launched: 23 June 1963
- Completed: 1964
- Acquired: 31 March 1964
- In service: 1964
- Out of service: 10 October 2006
- Identification: Call sign: HSB3052; IMO number: 5414971
- Fate: Capsized on the Chao Praya River in Bangkok, later Scrapped

General characteristics
- Class & type: Mikhail Kalinin-class ocean liner
- Tonnage: 6,262 GRT; 1,355 DWT
- Length: 122.15 m (400.75 ft)
- Beam: 16.00 m (52.49 ft)
- Height: 7.60 m (24.93 ft)
- Draught: 5.26 m (17.26 ft)
- Installed power: 2 × MAN-DMR K6Z57/80 diesels, 6,192 kW (8,304 hp)
- Propulsion: 2 propellers
- Speed: 17.0 knots (31.5 km/h; 19.6 mph)
- Capacity: 333 passengers
- Crew: 134

MS Siritara Ocean Queen was a cruise ship owned since 2006 by Siritara Enterprise in Thailand. She was built in 1964 by VEB Mathias-Thesen Werft, Wismar, East Germany as Bashkiriya (Russian: Башкирия) for the Soviet Union's Black Sea Shipping Company. It was named after Bashkir Autonomous Soviet Socialist Republic (now Bashkortostan) in the former Soviet Union. Since 2003 she has also been the sole surviving Ivan Franko-class vessel, the other sisters having sunk or been scrapped.

The ship capsized on the Chao Praya River in Bangkok on 10 October 2006 and was a total loss. She was later scrapped on site.

== See also ==
- List of cruise ships
