= Okean Shipyard =

Shipyard in Mykolaiv, Ukraine

Coordinates: 46.8554°N 31.9853°E

The Okean Shipyard (Ukrainian: Завод «Океан») is the third major ship construction yard in Mykolaiv, Ukraine. It features modern production facilities supplied by world-renowned companies, and has both medium and heavy tonnage production lines. The shipyard has constructed a variety of vessels, including non-self propelled barges, sea rescue tugs, timber-carriers, fish-processing factories, bulk carriers, and research ships.

The shipyard was established in the 1950s and has specialized in large merchant ships, including the oil/ore carriers of the Boris Butoma class (130,000 DWT).

== History ==
Dock of the Okean Shipyard in 2004.

The factory was started in 1951. In 1955, a lateral transfer and trigger device (slip) was installed.

From 1952 – 1972 more than 200 ships were built. These included 7 bulk carriers type “Irgiz”, 46 reefers type “Tavriya”, 14 timber-carriers type “Sibirles” (for the USSR Navy), and 15 fishing trawlers type “Altay” (for the Murmansk trawler fleet).

During the 1970s, the shipyard underwent significant reconstruction. In 1972, one of Europe's largest dry docks was commissioned, allowing the installation of a second line. Simultaneously, fabrication continued on fishing trawlers for the Murmansk fleet, and fabrication began on eight large ore carriers of the "Zoe Kosmodemyanskaya" type, two of which were intended for export.

In 1974, 18 vessels of a new series of super-trawlers type “Gorizont” (for Murmansk fleet) were constructed. From 1977, the yard built 26 ore carriers of type “Hariton” for Black Sea Shipping. Research vessels were fabricated for the Moscow Sonar Institute for oceanographic research. Fish processing bases were constructed for the Far East and installed a new slip.

In 1997, Okean produced bulk carriers of type Panamax.

In the fall of 2000, a tender was issued for 78% for the company. In October 2000, an agreement was signed between Damen Shipyards Group and the State Property Fund of Ukraine. The shipyard was renamed as Damen Shipyards Okean. In 2001, Damen Shipyards Group purchased additional shares of Okean, gaining 98.7% control of the factory.

Since August 2006 until July 2008, the controlling share of the company has belonged to a Norwegian group, Aker Yards ASA. During this period, the yard launched a total of 13 ships.

In the fall of 2008 the yard became part of Wadan Yards Group AS.

From 2009 to 2010, 24 self-propelled dry cargo twin-mixed (river-sea) navigation vessels were fabricated for Nibulon. On March 18, 2011, the yard was renamed Nikoliavsky shipbuilding yard Okean.

In May 2011, a series of multi-function pushers were displayed for Nibulon. A total of 13 vessels were ordered for Russian company Technogarant, including pontoons and dreggers.

=== Legal challenges to the former transfers of ownership ===
The Ukrainian shipyard was transferred to different companies in the weeks before konkursåpning (bankruptcy proceedings, in March 2010), and eventually was transferred to a company in the British Virgin Isles—Dartwell.

Johan Ratvik was appointed administrator, where he then asked Økokrim and the Oslo Police District to investigate for bounndragelse (withholding assets from the estate).

The estate of the bankrupted Norwegian company (konkursboet) made a deal with Kostyantyn Zhevago; Zhevago acquired claims of 50 million euro that the bankrupted company has against the Ukrainian shipyard, in addition to Zhevago receiving the shares in 'Okean' — the company that owned 98.7% of the Ukrainian shipyard. If Zhevago is successful in recouping the assets, then the bankrupted estate will get a share.

In a spring 2012 press release, Tom Einertsen announced Zhevago's lawsuit, saying that "The transfer of shares and loans were part of an operation to withhold (unndra) great assets from creditors. The transfers were illegal. Our goal is to get the shipyard back." Zhevago has sued in Amsterdam by five companies. In New York, Zhevago initiated a discovery court process to demand access to the documentation of a U.S. law firm that assisted in transferring the ownership of the shipyard to multiple companies— first in the British Virgin Isles, then Panama, then the Netherlands, and then to the British Virgin Isles again. Court hearings in New York were scheduled to proceed in July 2013.

== Layout ==
The shipyard is located in the southern portion of Mykolaiv Oblast in the ship-building region of Ukraine, downstream of the Southern Bug river's left bank. The total area of the plant is 101 hectares with an additional water area of 42 hectares. The total length of the outfitting quays is more than 600 metres. There are two SZMT (Krasnoyarsk) 300 ton (530?) lift each gantry cranes.

== See also ==
- Wadan Yards
- List of ships of Russia by project number
- List of Soviet and Russian submarine classes
