= Zaporizhzhia Shipbuilding-Shiprepair Plant =

Civil shipbuilding company in Ukraine

Open Joint Stock Company Zaporizhzhia Shipbuilding-ShipRepair Plant is a civil shipbuilding company that carries out the repair of vessels and ships to the needs of river and sea fleet, located in Zaporizhzhia (Ukraine). The branch of a joint-stock shipping company "Ukrrichflot." The factory has a developed shipbuilding base, including technology, equipment, specialists, that allows to repair and build ships and river vessels of mixed type of swimming "river-sea", passenger boats and other marine equipment.

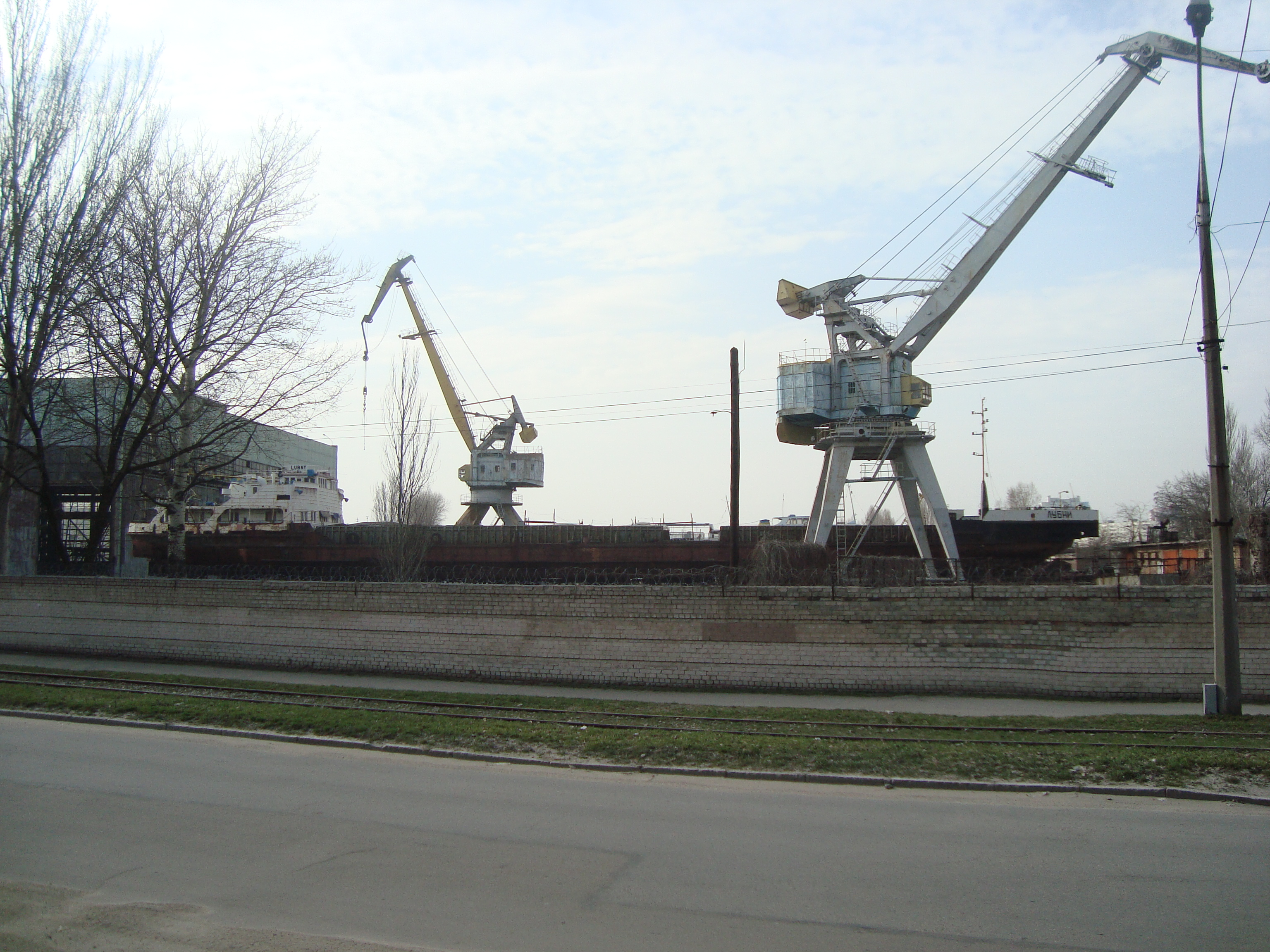
Zaporizhzhia Shipbuilding-Shiprepair Plant

The legal address of the company: 69055, Ukraine, Zaporizhzhia, Glisserna street, 14.

== Production capacity ==
- special wheel to lift vessels weighing up to 800 tons, length to 90 m, width to 16 m;
- floating dock for lifting vessels weighing up to 5,000 tons, a length to 135 m, a width to 20 m;
- lift vessels weighing up to 327 tons;
- floating workshop

== Main products ==
Civil shipbuilding

- Vessels of type "Sea- Sea"
  - Construction and repair of ships of type "the sea - the sea"
- Cargo ships
  - Vehicles for transportation lamps
  - Ships containers
  - Universal cargo ships
- Tankers
  - Sea Tankers
- Auxiliary vessels
  - Icebreakers

Ship repair and specialized work

- Capital, average, current, emergency repairs, accommodation in ports and modernization of vessels weighing up to 5,000 tons, passenger boats and other vessels of technical and passenger fleets.
- all types of repair of river ships and vessels of mixed type "sea -sea" and ship equipment
- repair of ship systems and devices
- overhaul of diesel engines (fuel equipment, adjustment and repair nozzles)
- electrical work, repair and manufacturing of switchgear, making jobs with current and

average repair of ship electrical equipment.

== Shipbuilding ==
In 2008, in Zaporizhzhia joint stock shipping company "Ukrrichflot" has completed production of series of five self-propelled barges of the type "Europe-M". Non-propelled barges of the type "Europa-M", were designed by office "Ukrrichflot" in 2004 and they are modern vehicles, which have a number of competitive advantages over most barges of fleets that were operated on the Danube. The length of the vessel is 76 meters, width - 11.4 m, capacity - 2080 tons.
