= MS Shota Rustaveli =

Soviet cruise ship built in 1968

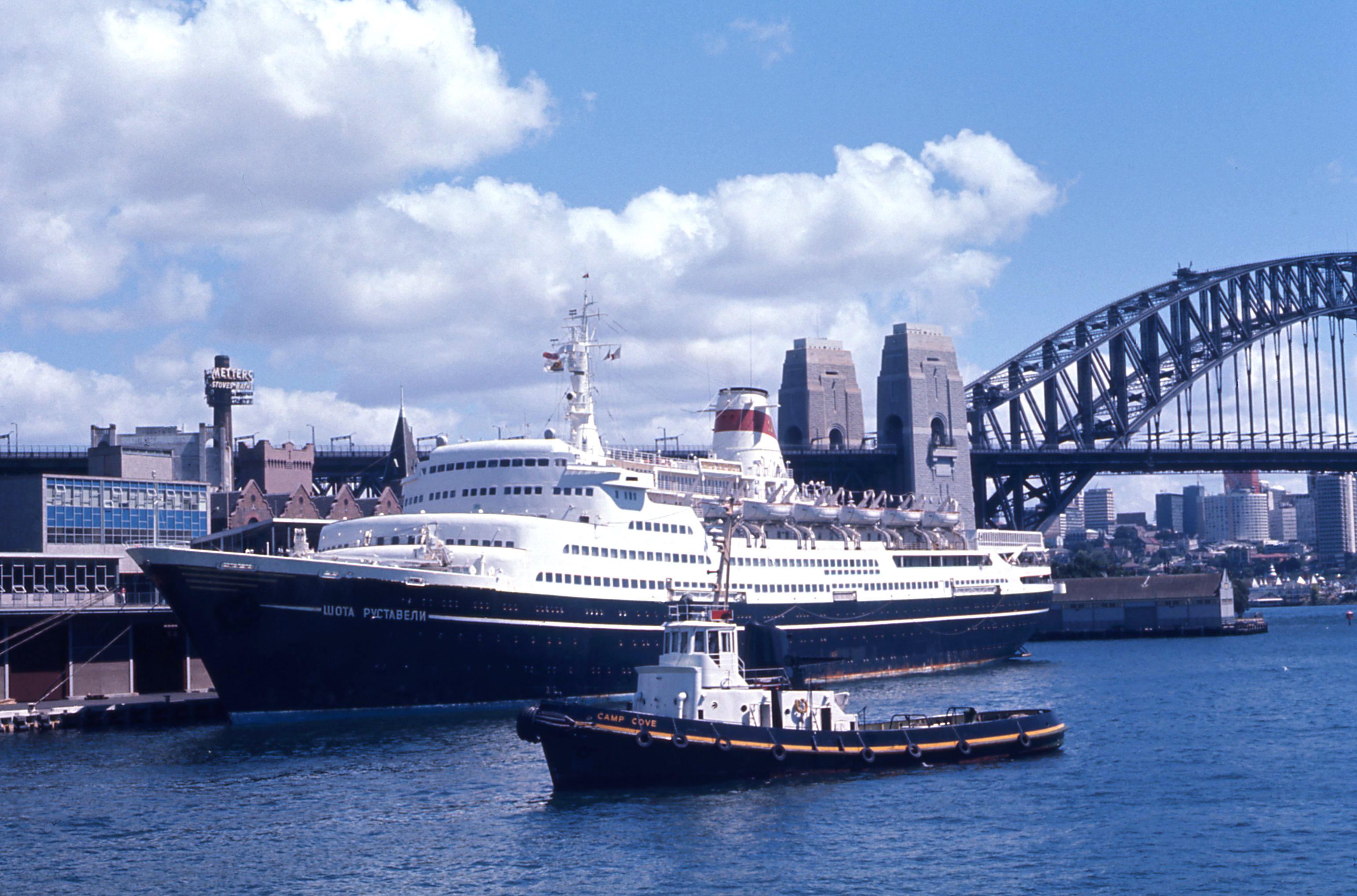
- Shota Rustaveli in Sydney Cove

History
- Name: 1968–2000: Shota Rustaveli; 2000–2003: Assedo
- Owner: 1968–1995: Black Sea Shipping Company; 1995–1997: BLASCO UK; 1997–2000: Ocean Agencies; 2000–2003: Kaalbye Shipping International
- Port of registry: 1968–1991: Odesa, Soviet Union; 1991–1995: Odesa, Ukraine; 1995–1997: Monrovia, Liberia; 1997–2001: Odesa, Ukraine; 2001–2002: Kingstown, Saint Vincent and the Grenadines; 2002–2003: Odesa, Ukraine
- Builder: Mathias Thesen Werft, Wismar, East Germany
- Yard number: 128
- Laid down: 11 October 1965
- Launched: 29 December 1966
- Acquired: 30 June 1968
- In service: 1968
- Out of service: 2003
- Identification: Call sign: UUGF; IMO number: 6707753
- Fate: Scrapped in Alang, India, in 2003

General characteristics (as built)
- Class & type: Ivan Franko-class passenger ship
- Tonnage: 19,361 GRT; 5,696 DWT
- Displacement: 13,010 tons
- Length: 175.77 m (576 ft 8 in)
- Beam: 23.55 m (77 ft 3 in)
- Draught: 8.10 m (26 ft 7 in)
- Depth: 13.5 m (44 ft 3 in)
- Installed power: 2 × Sulzer-Cegielski 7RND76; 15,666 kW (combined)
- Speed: 21 knots (39 km/h; 24 mph)
- Capacity: 750 passengers
- Crew: 347

MS Shota Rustaveli was a cruise ship, built in 1968 by V.E.B. Mathias-Thesen Werft, Wismar, East Germany for the Soviet Union's Black Sea Shipping Company and named after the Georgian poet Shota Rustaveli. After the fall of the Soviet Union she was handed to Ukraine. In 2000, she was sold to Kaalbye Group and renamed MS Assedo. In 2003, she was scrapped at Alang, India.
