= MS Ivan Franko =

Soviet cruise ship

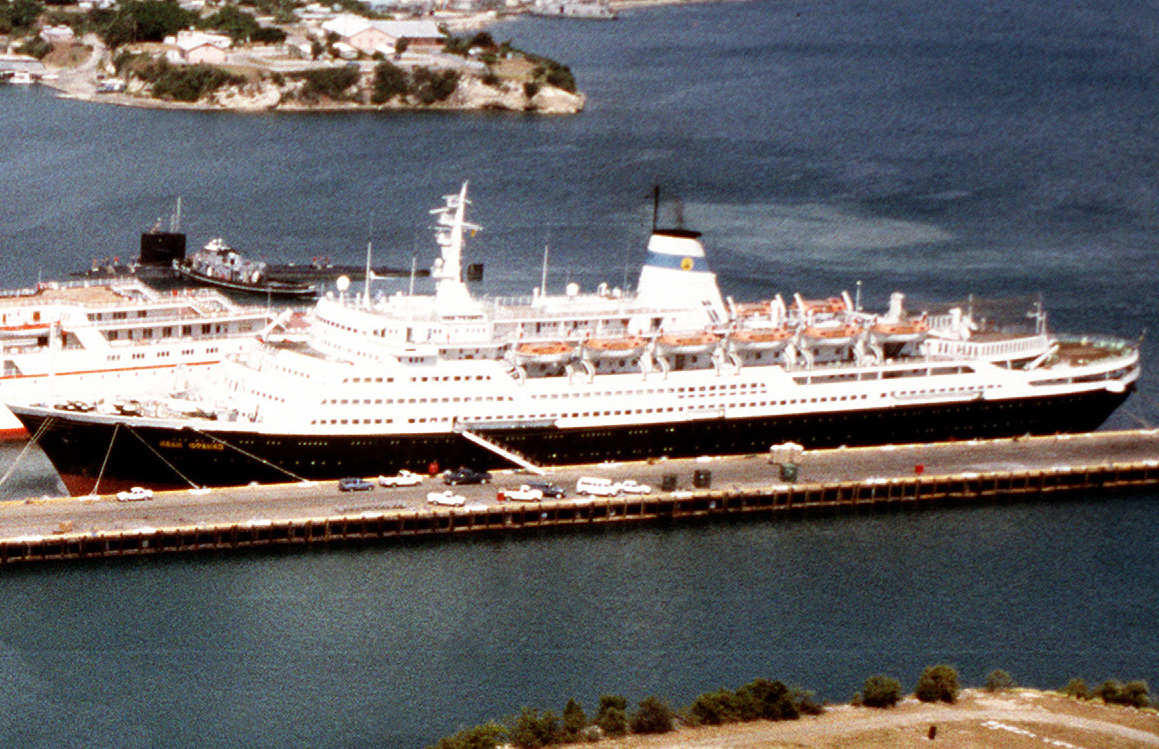
- Ivan Franko

History
- Name: Ivan Franko
- Namesake: Ivan Franko
- Operator: Black Sea Shipping Co., Odesa
- Port of registry: 1964–1992: Odesa, Soviet Union; 1992–1997: Odesa, Ukraine; 1997 onwards: Kingstown, Saint Vincent and the Grenadines
- Builder: V.E.B. Mathias-Thesen Werft, Wismar, East Germany
- Yard number: 125
- Launched: 15 June 1963
- Completed: 1964
- Acquired: 14 November 1964
- Maiden voyage: 1964
- In service: 1964
- Out of service: 21 July 1997
- Identification: Call sign: J8TA9; IMO number: 5415901
- Fate: Scrapped at Alang, India, in 1997
- Notes: Beached for scrap on July 21, 1997

General characteristics
- Type: Cruise ship
- Tonnage: 19,861 GT; 6,007 DWT
- Length: 155 m (508 ft 6 in)
- Beam: 25 m (82 ft 0 in)
- Draught: 7.8 m (25 ft 7 in)
- Propulsion: 2 × Sulzer Werkspoor 7-cylinder diesel engines, 15,666 kW (21,008 hp)
- Speed: 21 knots (39 km/h; 24 mph)
- Capacity: 750 passengers

MS Ivan Franko was the first Ivan Franko-class passenger ship owned by the Soviet Union's Black Sea Shipping Company. She was built in 1964 by V.E.B. Mathias-Thesen Werft, Wismar, East Germany. She was scrapped in 1997 at Alang, India.
