= Mikhail Kalinin-class passenger ship =

Class of Soviet ocean liners and cruise ships

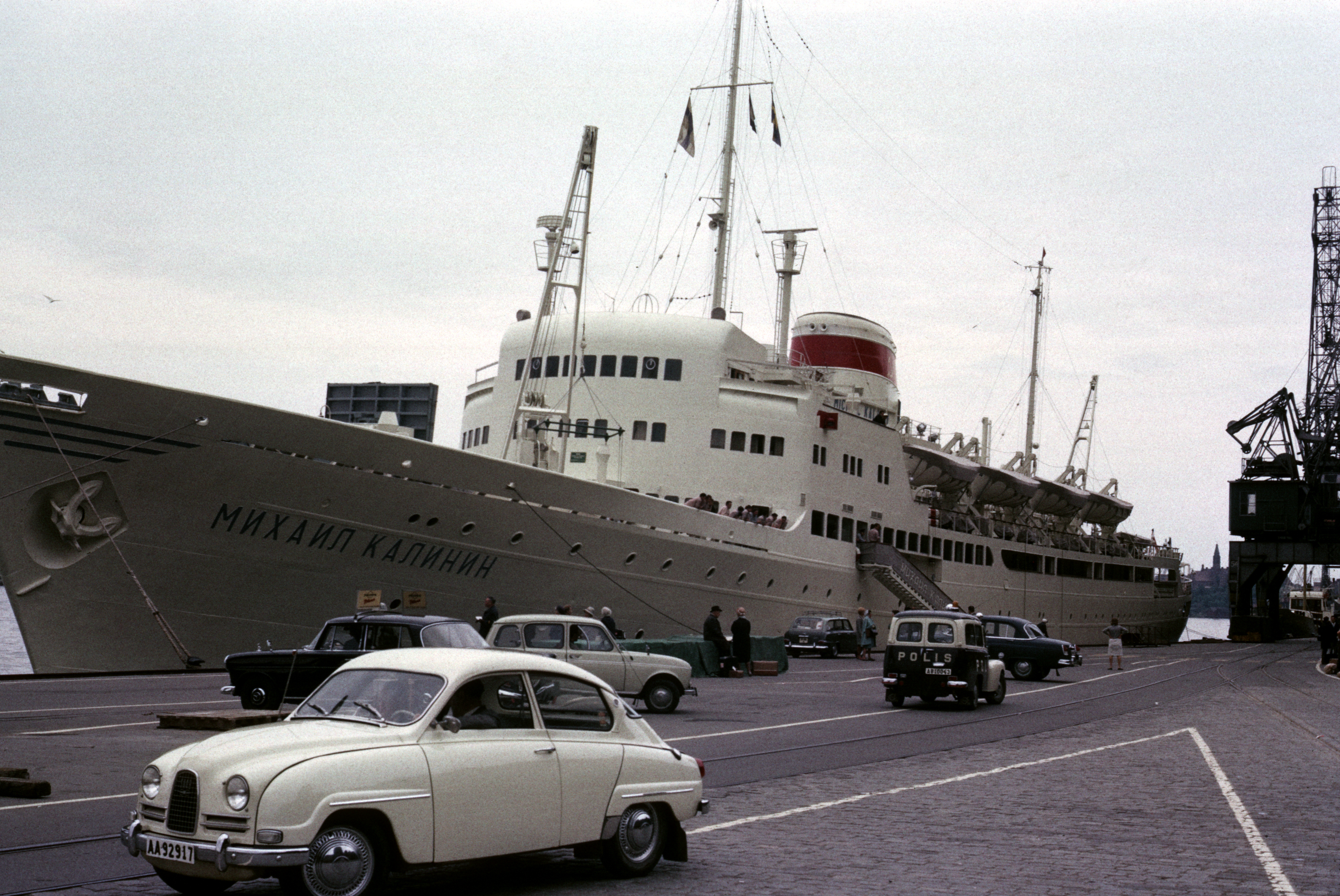
- MS Mikhail Kalinin in Stockholm, 1965

Class overview
- Builders: VEB Mathias-Thesen Werft, Wismar, East Germany
- Succeeded by: Ivan Franko-class (project 301/SeeFa 750)
- Built: 1958–1964
- In service: 1958
- Planned: 19
- Completed: 19
- Lost: 2
- Retired: 17

General characteristics
- Type: Ocean liner → Cruise ship
- Tonnage: 1st series: 4,871 GT; 2nd series: 5,230 GT; 3rd series: 6,152 GT; 4th series: 5,261 GT
- Length: 122.15 m (401 ft) overall
- Beam: 16.00 m (52 ft)
- Height: 7.60 m (25 ft)
- Draught: 5.18 m (17 ft)
- Decks: 4 passenger decks
- Installed power: 2 × MAN-DMR K6Z57/80 diesels, 6,192 kW (8,304 hp)
- Propulsion: 2 propellers
- Speed: 17.0 knots (31.5 km/h; 19.6 mph)
- Capacity: 333 passengers

The Mikhail Kalinin-class passenger ship (project 101, in Germany known as Seefa 340) is a class of Soviet ocean liners and cruise ships, operated by the Baltic State Shipping Company (BGMP), Far East Shipping Company (FESCO) and Black Sea Shipping Company (ChMMP or BLASCO). The 19 Soviet ships of this class were constructed in 1958–1964 by the East German company VEB Mathias-Thesen Werft, in Wismar. The class was named after the first ship in the class Mikhail Kalinin, which in her turn was named after the nominal head of state of Russia and later of the Soviet Union Mikhail Kalinin.

== Ocean liners/cruise ships of the project 101/Seefa 340 ==
Mikhail Kalinin-class passenger ships
No.	Original name	English transliteration
First series of Project 101/Seefa 340
1	Михаил Калинин	Mikhail Kalinin
2	Феликс Дзержинский (Exelsior Neptune)	Feliks Dzerzhinskiy (Exelsior Neptune)
3	Григорий Орджоникидзе	Grigoriy Ordzhonikidze
4	М. Урицкий	M. Uritskiy
5	Вацлав Воровский	Vatslav Vorovskiy
6	Мария Ульянова (Excelsior Mercury)	Mariya Ulyanova (Excelsior Mercury)
7	Эстония (Екатерина II)	Estoniya (Ekaterina II)
8	Латвия	Latviya (Latvia)
9	Литва (Boguchar, Fu Jian, Green Coast)	Litva (Boguchar, Fu Jian, Green Coast)
10	Петропавловск (Босфор)	Petropavlovsk (Bosfor)
11	Владивосток (Приамурье, Priamurye)	Vladivostok (Priamurye (ru), Priamurye)
Second series of Project 101/Seefa 340
12	Туркмения	Turkmeniya
13	Хабаровск (Sounds of Orient)	Khabarovsk (Sounds of Orient)
14	Николаевск	Nikolayevsk
15	Байкал	Baykal
Third series of Project 101/Seefa 340
16	Надежда Крупская (Кубань, Susana)	Nadezhda Krupskaya (Kuban, Susana)
Fourth series of Project 101/Seefa 340
17	Армения (Odessa Star, Арм)	Armeniya (Odessa Star, Arm)
18	Башкирия (Odessa Song, Royal Dream, Silver Star, Star, Nandini, Olviara, Ocean Princess, Siritara Ocean Queen)	Bashkiriya (Odessa Song, Royal Dream, Silver Star, Star, Nandini, Olviara, Ocean Princess, Siritara Ocean Queen)
19	Аджария	Adzhariya

== Overview ==
Mikhail Kalinin-class passenger ships
Year of build	Hull No	Image	Name	First operator	Port of Registry	Flag	IMO-No.	Status
1958	101		Mikhail Kalinin	BGMP	Leningrad	→	5234917	1994 laid up in Murmansk, later scrapped in India
1958	102		Excelsior Neptune	BLASCO	Odessa → Vladivostok → Panama City → San Lorenzo	→ →	5113436	originally, the Feliks Dzerzhinskiy (until October 1988), sank at shipyard in 1993, later scrapped
1959	103		Grigoriy Ordzhonikidze	FESCO	Vladivostok	Soviet Union	5404677	scrapped in 1992
1959	104	Image	M. Uritskiy	FESCO	Vladivostok → Ust-Dunaysk	→	5215997	scrapped in 1996
1959	105		Vatslav Vorovskiy	MMP	Murmansk	Soviet Union	5429407	wrecked
1959	106		Excelsior Mercury	SMP	Arkhangelsk → Leningrad → Vladivostok → Panama City → San Lorenzo	→ →	5223384	originally, the Mariya Ulyanova (until 1988); scrapped in 1993
1960	107	Image	Ekaterina II	FESCO	Leningrad → Novorossiysk	→	5109019	originally, the Estoniya (until 1992); scrapped in 2003
1960	108	Image	Latviya	BLASCO	Odessa	→	5203920	scrapped in 1995
1960	109	Image	Boguchar	BLASCO	Odessa	→	5209780	originally, the Litva (until 1992); scrapped in 1997
1960	110		Bosfor	BLASCO	Odessa → Panama City	→	5276563	originally, the Petropavlovsk (until the 1980s); scrapped in 1997
1961	111		Priamurye	FESCO	Vladivostok → Saint John's	→	5383029	originally, the Vladivostok (until 1967); burnt in Port of Osaka on May 18, 1988, and was consequently scrapped
1961	112		Turkmeniya	FESCO	Vladivostok	Soviet Union	5371131	scrapped in 1992
1962	113		Sounds of Orient	FESCO	Vladivostok → Panama City	→	5186196	originally, the Khabarovsk; scrapped in 1989
1962	114	Image	Nikolayevsk	FESCO	Petropavlovsk-Kamchatsky → Murmansk	→	5252359	scrapped in 1994
1962	115		Baykal	FESCO	Vladivostok	→	5401352	scrapped in 1998
1963	116		Susana	BGMP	Leningrad	→	6415207	originally, the Nadezhda Krupskaya, scrapped in 1998
1963	117	Image	Arm	BLASCO	Odessa	→	5024752	originally, the Armeniya, formerly Odessa Star (1993–1995), scrapped as Arm in July 1995
1964	118		Siritara Ocean Queen	BLASCO	Odessa → Valletta → Panama City → Bangkok	→ → →	5414971	originally, the Bashkiriya, formerly Odessa Song, Royal Dream, Silver Star, Star, * Nandini, Olviara, Ocean Princess;* capsized on the Chao Praya River in Bangkok on October 10, 2006
1964	119	Image	Adzhariya	BLASCO	Odessa	→	6415130	scrapped in 1996

== See also ==
- List of cruise ships
