= MS Taras Shevchenko (1965) =

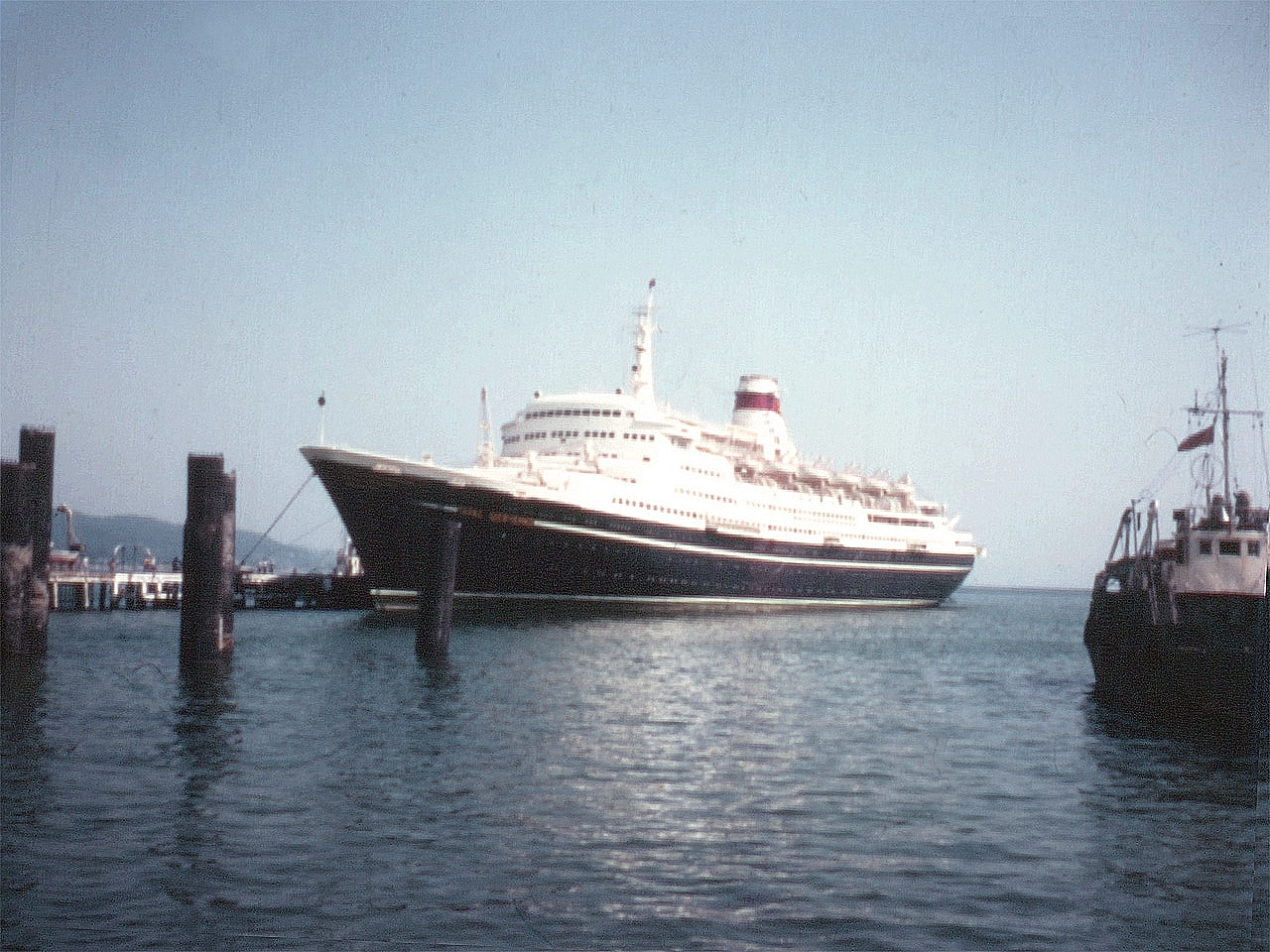
- Taras Shevchenko in Quay in Sukhumi, June 1970

History
- Name: 1966-2004: Taras Shevchenko; 2004-2005: Tara
- Owner: 1966–1995: Black Sea Shipping Company; 1995–1997: Blasco UK; 1997–2004: Ocean Agencies
- Operator: 1966–1989: Black Sea Shipping Company; 1989–1994: Jahn Reisen; 1995–1997: Blasco UK; 1997–1998: Ocean Agencies; 1998–2003: laid up; 2003–2004: Antarktika JSC
- Port of registry: 1966–1991: Odessa, Soviet Union; 1991–1995: Odesa, Ukraine; 1995–1997: Monrovia, Liberia; 1997–2005: unknown; 2005: Moroni, Comoros
- Builder: V.E.B. Mathias-Thesen Werft, Wismar, East Germany
- Yard number: 127
- Launched: 16 January 1965
- Completed: 1966
- Acquired: 26 April 1966
- In service: 1966
- Out of service: November 2004
- Identification: Call sign: UTVT; IMO number: 6508195
- Fate: Scrapped 2005

General characteristics
- Class & type: Ivan Franko-class passenger ship
- Tonnage: 20,027 GRT; 6,000 t DWT
- Length: 175.80 m (576.77 ft)
- Beam: 23.53 m (77.20 ft)
- Draught: 8.16 m (26.77 ft)
- Installed power: 4 × Sulzer-Cegielski diesels, combined 15445 kW
- Speed: 20,5 knots
- Capacity: 750 passengers (as built); 400 passengers (as rebuilt); 714 passengers (as rebuilt)
- Crew: 370

This is about the cruise ship. For the river cruise ship, see T. G. Shevchenko (1991).

MS Taras Shevchenko was a cruise ship owned by the Soviet Union's Black Sea Shipping Company. She was built in 1966 by V.E.B. Mathias-Thesen Werft, Wismar, East Germany. She was scrapped in 2005 in Chittagong, Bangladesh. The ship was named after Ukrainian painter and poet Taras Shevchenko.

== History ==
Taras Shevchenko was the third Ivan Franko-class passenger ship built by V.E.B. Mathias-Thesen Werft for the Soviet Union. Originally she was planned as the last ship of the series, but the Soviet Union's national shipping company Morflot decided to order two additional sisters, which made her the middle sister. She was delivered to the Black Sea Shipping Company on 26 April 1966 and placed on cruise traffic. Sometime during her Soviet Union career the Taras Shevchenko was rebuilt with a larger forward superstructure. In 1989 she was chartered to Jahn Reisen for a five-year period. The Soviet Union broke up during this charter, and as a result of this the Taras Shevchenko was handed over to the state of Ukraine. Following the end of the Jahn Reisen charter in 1995, she was transferred to Blasco UK and re-flagged to Monrovia, Liberia. During the same year she was rebuilt at Odessa.

In 1997 Taras Shevchenko was sold to the Ukraine-based Ocean Agencies who used her for further cruise traffic. In June 1998, when she was about to depart on a three-week cruise, the ship was arrested in Piraeus, Greece due to the company's financial problems. In July 1998 the ship was laid up at Ilichevsk, where she remained for five years. In 2003 she was put back into service as a cruise ship by the Ukraine-based Antarktika JSC, who used her for cruises aimed at a Ukrainian cliente. This venture was not able to attract a viable charterer, and Taras Shevchenko was sold for scrap in 2004. Renamed Tara, scrappers in Alang, India were outbid, and Tara was scrapped in Chittagong, Bangladesh in 2005.

== See also ==
- List of cruise ships
- T. G. Shevchenko (1991)
