= TKMS Wismar =

German shipbuilding company

Coordinates: 53.896667°N 11.436389°E

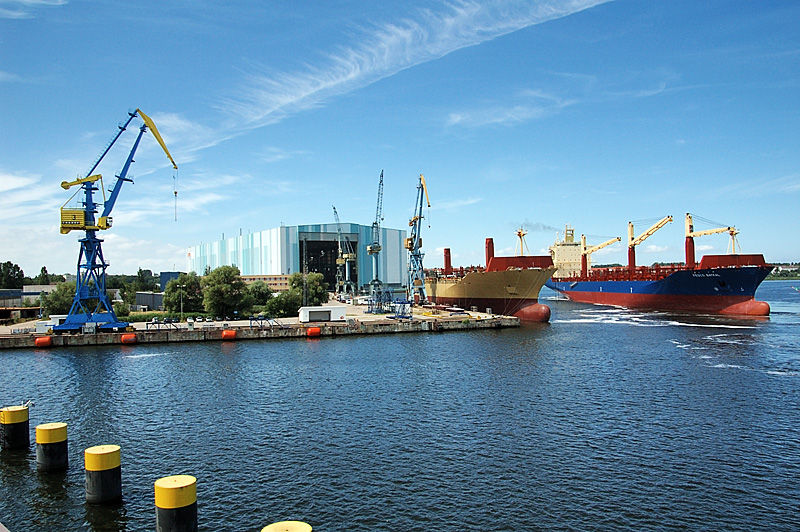
- Wismar shipyard
- Type: Subsidiary
- Industry: Shipbuilding
- Founded: 27 April 1946
- Headquarters: Wismar, Germany
- Number of employees: 700
- Parent: TKMS
- Website: tkmsgroup.com/wismar

TKMS Wismar is a German shipyard located in Wismar owned by TKMS (ThyssenKrupp Marine Systems). The yard was founded on 27 April 1946 as a Red Army ship repair facility. Over the decades it has changed ownership several times and has operated under a number of names, including VEB Mathias-Thesen-Werft Wismar, Aker MTW Werft, Wadan Yards, Nordic Yards Wismar, MV Werften Wismar, and Meyer Wismar.

== History ==
The yard at Wismar was founded on April 27, 1946 as a Red Army ship repair shop, which was handed over to the German state administration on January 1, 1947.

=== 1951 to 1990: VEB Mathias-Thesen-Werft Wismar ===
After the takeover of the old Hanse shipyard, the integration of the site of the former "Hafenschmiede" and the boatyard "Schröder und Schackow", the resulting state-owned company was renamed VEB Mathias-Thesen-Werft Wismar (MTW) on 31 October 1951. In 1959, MTW and other shipbuilding companies were merged into the Association of Publicly-owned Shipbuilding Companies (VVB Schiffbau). The development of group-like organizational structures, which can generally be observed in the industrial sector of the GDR, continued in 1979 with the conversion of VVB Schiffbau into the Kombinat Schiffbau Rostock.

From the 1950s, a large number of seagoing vessels were built for the trading and fishing fleets of the East Germany (GDR), other Comecon countries and the international market. In 1960 the only new cruise ship built in the GDR, MS Fritz Heckert, was launched in Wismar.

Extensive modernization work took place between 1982 and 1985 to bring the shipyard up to date.

=== 1990 to 1992: Mathias-Thesen-Werft ===
In the course of the economic reforms in the period of reunification in the former GDR, the VEB Mathias-Thesen-Werft Wismar was converted into a corporation on June 1, 1990 and operated as Mathias-Thesen-Werft Wismar GmbH, a subsidiary of Deutsche Maschinen- und Schiffbau AG (DMS) in Rostock, fully owned by the Treuhandanstalt.

=== 1992 to 1998: MTW Shipyard ===
After the renaming in 1992 to MTW Schiffswerft GmbH (MTW now for "Meerestechnik Wismar", the takeover by the Bremer Vulkan Verbund AG followed in August 1992. From 1994 to 1998 modernization took place through investments amounting to approx. 1 billion DM, although Bremer Vulkan had to file for bankruptcy in 1996.

=== 1998 to 2008: Aker MTW ===
On May 1, 1998, the Norwegian group Aker RGI took over the shipyard, which henceforth bore the name "Aker MTW". The former Kvaerner Warnow Werft Rostock GmbH and the Aker MTW Werft have been cooperated under the name "Aker Ostsee" since about the integration of the Kvaerner Group into the existing Aker Yards group of companies in 2002, as Aker MTW Wismar from 2006.

=== 2008 to 2009: Wadan Yards MTW Wismar ===
In 2008, Aker Yards sold the majority of its shares to a Russian financial investor. The transaction came into effect retrospectively as of January 1, 2008, and from September 22 the yards traded as "Wadan Yards".

On June 5, 2009, the German divisions of Wadan Yards Group AS, including the yard in Wismar, filed for insolvency at the District Court of Schwerin. The Schwerin lawyer Marc Odebrecht, a member of the law firm Brinkmann & Partner, was appointed as insolvency administrator.

=== 2009 to 2016: Nordic Yards Wismar ===
In mid-August 2009, the insolvency administrator was able to present an investor who also took over the Wismar shipyard. Nord Stream Moscow office head Vitaly Yusufov (Russian: Виталий Юсуфов, English transcription: Vitaly Yusufov), son of former Russian Energy Minister and Gazprom Supervisory Board member Igor Yusufov (Игорь Юсуфов, Igor Yusufov), acquired the assets of the German Wadan business units through the Nordic Yards, founded by him, for around 40.5 million euros. After the sale of all assets, the still insolvent German Wadan Yards parts are a legal shell through which the Wadan creditors are compensated.

In October 2009, work was resumed in the company, but new orders were initially pending. It was not until 2010 that construction of a Nordic AT 19 tanker designed for arctic conditions for the Russian company MMC Norilsk Nickel, worth around 100 million euros, could begin. Since 2010, the company has been involved in the offshore sector with the construction of platforms and special ships . In December 2012, the shipyard received a Russian government contract to build two ice-breaking rescue and recovery ships for the Arctic.

The director Dieter Schumann accompanied the slide of the company and its employees into insolvency as well as the rescue maneuvers that were supposed to lead out of it in his film "Wadan's World". This premiered on October 22, 2010 as part of the 53rd International Leipzig Festival for Documentary and Animated Film.

=== 2016 to 2022: MV Werften Wismar ===
In March 2016, the Malaysian-Chinese shipping company Genting Hong Kong acquired Nordic Yards for €230 million; the Wismar shipyard was valued at €108.5 million. Together with Lloyd Werft Bremerhaven, the shipyards in Wismar, Warnemünde, and Stralsund were initially intended to operate under the name “Lloyd Werft Group” and focus on the construction of cruise ships. However, in July 2016 the establishment of MV Werften, headquartered in Wismar, was announced, and cruise ship construction was concentrated at the MV Werften sites.

On 20 March 2020, production on ongoing shipbuilding projects was suspended and the shipyard was temporarily closed due to operational restrictions related to the COVID-19 pandemic. Norddeutscher Rundfunk reported that the shipyard group was having difficulty paying invoices for the second Global-class cruise ship and the expedition yacht Crystal Endeavor, which were being built at the Warnemünde and Stralsund sites. MV Werften contacted KfW and applied for liquidity assistance under the federal COVID-19 special programme.

On 10 January 2022, the company filed for bankruptcy.

=== From 2022: TKMS / Meyer Werft ===
On 10 June 2022, the shipyard was sold to TKMS (Thyssenkrupp Marine Systems), which plans to build naval vessels, including submarines and research ships, at the site from 2024. Meanwhile, the approximately 80 percent-completed Global Dream was acquired in November 2022 by Disney Cruise Line. Since renamed as Disney Adventure, it was completed and converted under the direction of Meyer Werft and entered service in March 2026. The insolvency administrator leased the shipyard facilities to Meyer Werft for the completion of the cruise ship.

== Ships built at Wismar shipyard, 1951–2025 ==
=== Ocean liners/Cruise ships ===
| Name | Year built | Built for | Status | Notes |
|---|---|---|---|---|
| Mikhail Kalinin | 1958 | Black Sea Shipping Company | scrapped in India 1994 | Mikhail Kalinin-class passenger ship (19 total in class) |
| Feliks Dzerzhinskiy | 1958 | Black Sea Shipping Company | sank off Canton, China 1993 | Mikhail Kalinin-class passenger ship (19 total in class) |
| Grigoriy Ordzhonikidze | 1959 | Far East Shipping Company | scrapped in India 1992 | Mikhail Kalinin-class passenger ship (19 total in class) |
| Bashkiriya | 1964 | Black Sea Shipping Company | Capsized in the Chao Praya River October 10, 2006 (Bangkok, Thailand) as MS Siritara Ocean Queen. Was later scrapped on site. | Mikhail Kalinin-class passenger ship (19 total in class) |
| Ivan Franko | 1964 | Black Sea Shipping Company | scrapped in 1997 | Ivan Franko-class passenger ship |
| Aleksandr Pushkin | 1965 | Baltic Shipping Company | scrapped in 2021 | Ivan Franko-class passenger ship |
| Taras Shevchenko | 1966 | Black Sea Shipping Company | scrapped in Chittagong, Bangladesh in 2005 | Ivan Franko-class passenger ship |
| Shota Rustaveli | 1968 | Black Sea Shipping Company | scrapped at Alang, India in 2003 | Ivan Franko-class passenger ship |
| Mikhail Lermontov | 1972 | Baltic Shipping Company | sank 1986 near Marlborough Sounds in New Zealand | Ivan Franko-class passenger ship |
| C. Columbus | 1997 | Hapag & Lloyd | in service | designed for transit in the Great Lakes |
| Norwegian Sun | 2001 | Norwegian Cruise Line | in service | hull constructed at Wismar for subsequent outfitting at Lloyd Werft Bremerhaven |
| AIDAvita | 2002 | AIDA Cruises | in service | |
| AIDAaura | 2003 | AIDA Cruises | in service | |
| Disney Adventure (former Global Dream) | 2025 | Disney Cruise Line | in service | unfinished hull acquired by Disney Cruise Line from defunct Dream Cruises |

=== Folding kayaks ===
- Typ Kolibri

=== Cargo ships ===
- Typ Afrika
- Typ MBC
- Typ OBC
- Stephan Reeckmann (1982)

=== River cruise ships ===
- V. Chkalov (1954) – Rodina-class motorship for Yenisei Shipping Company
- Korolenko (1954)
- Kavkaz (1958)

=== Container ships ===
- MS Asterix 2010 – being converted (2015–2018) as Auxiliary replenishment vessel for Royal Canadian Navy
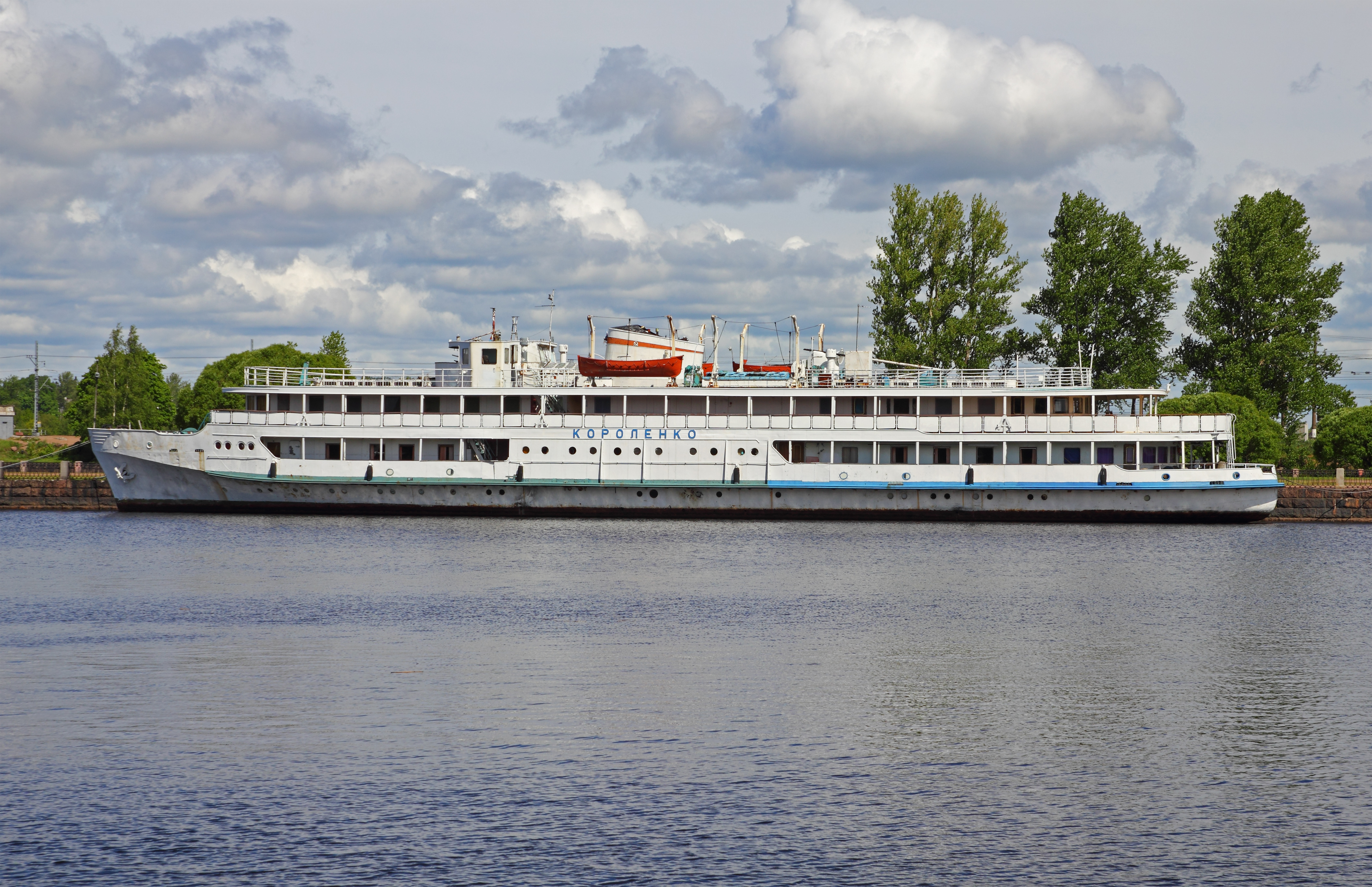
Korolenko as hotelship at Vyborg

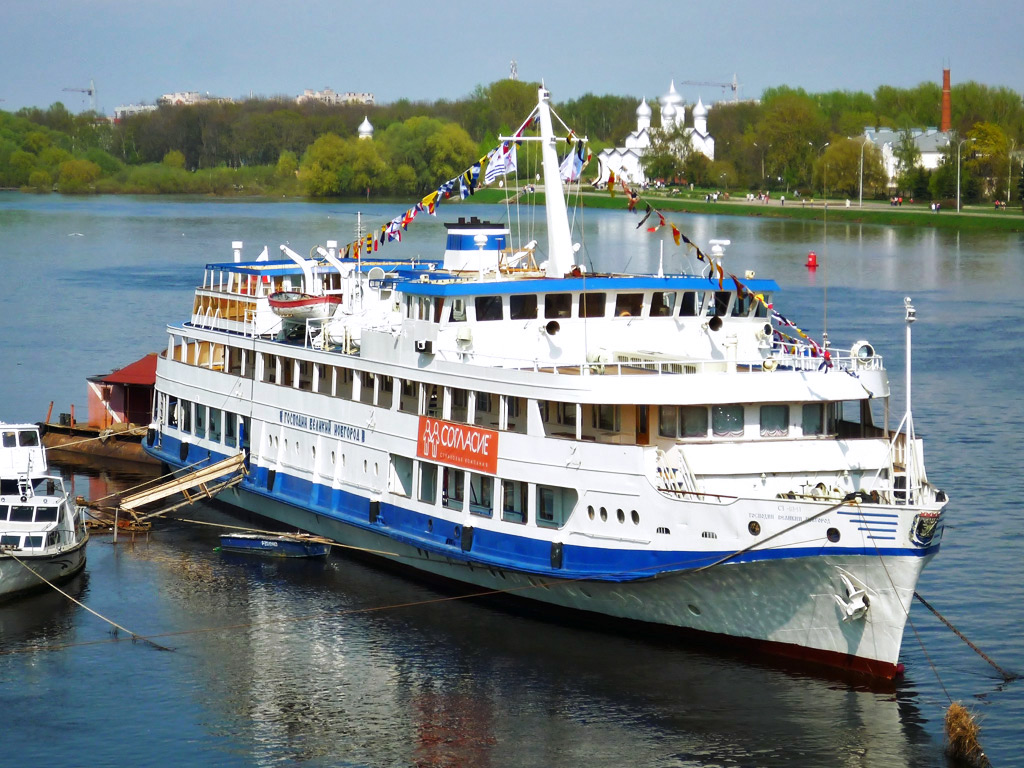
The Russian training ship Gospodin Velikiy Novgorod on the Volkhov River

== See also ==
- Elbewerft Boizenburg
- Wadan Yards
