= MS Mikhail Kalinin =

Soviet ocean liner built in 1958

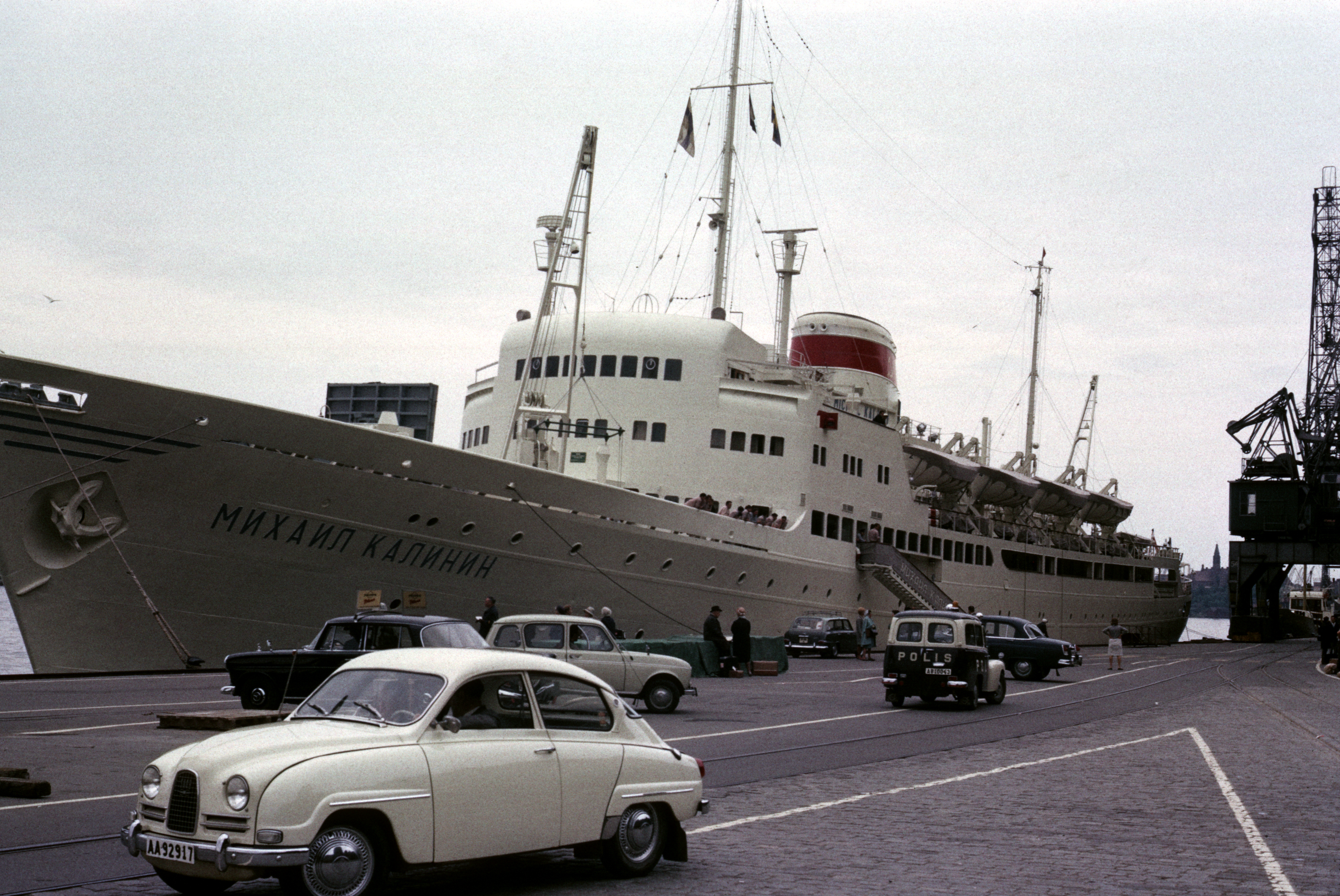
- Ocean liner Mikhail Kalinin at Stockholm in 1965

History
- Name: 1958–1994: Mikhail Kalinin
- Owner: 1958–1992: Baltic State Shipping Company; 1992–1994: OAO BMP
- Operator: 1958–1992: Baltic State Shipping Company
- Port of registry: 1958–1992: Leningrad, Soviet Union; 1992–1994: Saint Petersburg, Russia
- Builder: VEB Mathias-Thesen Werft, Wismar, East Germany
- Yard number: 101
- Laid down: 1956
- Launched: 25 May 1957
- Completed: 1958
- In service: 1958
- Out of service: 1994
- Identification: Call sign: UIDO; IMO number: 5234917
- Fate: Scrapped 1994

General characteristics
- Class & type: Mikhail Kalinin-class ocean liner
- Tonnage: 4,871 GRT; 1,358 DWT
- Length: 122.15 m (400.75 ft)
- Beam: 16.00 m (52.49 ft)
- Height: 7.60 m (24.93 ft)
- Draught: 5.18 m (16.99 ft)16.00 m (52.49 ft)
- Installed power: 2 × MAN-DMR K6Z57/80 diesels, 6,192 kW (8,304 hp)
- Propulsion: 2 propellers
- Speed: 17.0 knots (31.5 km/h; 19.6 mph)
- Capacity: 333 passengers
- Crew: 134

MS Mikhail Kalinin was an ocean liner owned by the Soviet Union's Baltic State Shipping Company. She was built in 1958 by VEB Mathias-Thesen Werft, Wismar, East Germany. The Mikhail Kalinin, named after the nominal head of state of Russia and later of the Soviet Union Mikhail Kalinin, was scrapped in 1994 in Alang, India.

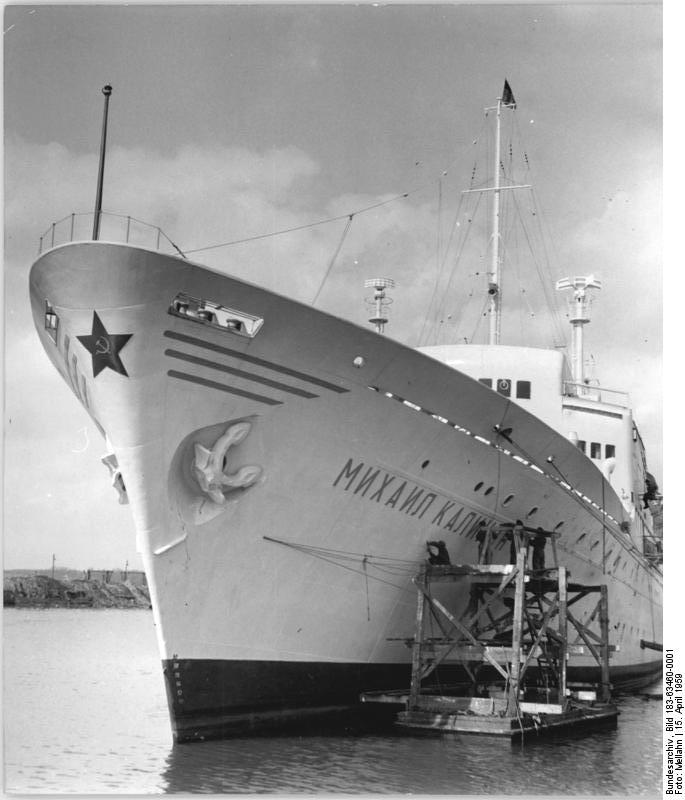
First passenger ship in sea-shipping history returned from Antarctica

== See also ==
- List of cruise ships
