= SS Metallurg Baykov =

Cargo ship built in 1960

History

Soviet Union
- Name: Metallurg Baykov; (Russian: Металлург Байков); Call Sign: UWQU; IMO number: 5233468
- Owner: 24 July 1960 – 1985: Black Sea Shipping Company, USSR
- Operator: 24 July 1960 – 1985: Black Sea Shipping Company
- Port of registry: 1960 – 1985: Odessa, USSR
- Builder: Kherson Shipyard
- Laid down: 25 March 1958
- Acquired: 24 July 1960; delivered by P. A. Martynov
- Maiden voyage: 24 July 1960
- Identification: IMO number: 5233468
- Fate: Decommissioned in 1985

General characteristics
- Class & type: Leninsky Komsomol-class cargo ship
- Tonnage: 11,094 GT; DW 16,090 or 16,020 mt
- Length: 557 ft (169.9 m)
- Beam: 72 ft (21.8 m)
- Height: 42 ft (12.9 m)
- Draught: 31.9 ft (9.73 m)
- Propulsion: Two steam turbine engines driving a 6.3 m (21 ft) screw propeller
- Capacity: Bale capacity 20,220 m^{3}; Grain capacity 23,765 m^{3}
- Crew: 48 crew members, 12 passengers and 8 cadets

The SS Metallurg Baykov (Russian: Металлург Байков) was a tweendecker freighter with steam turbine engines and the second Leninsky Komsomol-class cargo ship (Project 567). The merchant ship belonged to the Black Sea Shipping Company in the Soviet Union, and was named in honor of metallurgist Alexandr Baykov (in Russian).

== Background ==
Project 567 was developed at the Chernomorsudoproekt Central Design Bureau (CDB ChSP) in Nikolayev. K. I. Bohonevich was the chief designer until 1956, and B. K. Sidorov took over until 1961. All ship specifications are similar to those of the SS Leninsky Komsomol, the first ship in the Leninsky Komsomol class.

== History ==
=== Construction and early voyages ===
In 1959, despite the Kherson Shipyard's delivery of four tankers and the SS Leninsky Komsomol, the shipyard's productivity was only 82 percent. Its inability to reach production targets was due to a delay in the construction of the Metallurg Baykov. Expected to sign an agreement to begin the ship in 1959, the Black Sea Shipping Company only agreed to construction terms on 24 July 1960. The delay was due to a number of design errors, which were remedied in 1959. Logistical issues precluded rapid changes, since the Soviet system prevented the hasty acquisition of equipment from manufacturers.

According to the Singapore Free Press, the Metallurg Baykov was at berth 15/16 on 2 November 1960. She was briefly mentioned in an article, "Great Labour Victory", in the 14 March 1962 issue of the Soviet newspaper Одесский портовик (English: Odessa Port Workers): "The turbine ship Metallurg Baykov was unloaded 100 hours early".

=== Cuban blockade ===
The Metallurg Baykov's first voyage to Cuba during the Cuban blockade began in early August 1962 from Novorossiysk, and she arrived in Cuba on 25 August (Casablanca was an announced port of arrival). The ship carried a reported 1,400 tons of cargo, including trucks and cranes on the open deck.

Her second voyage to Cuba began on 14 September from Sevastopol, and the Metallurg Baykov arrived in Casilda on 30 September. The technicians and personnel of the mobile missile base, commanded by Lieutenant-Colonel I. V. Shishchenko of the 50th Missile Army, were on the ship.

On 14 October, US intelligence detected Soviet missiles in Cuba in an aerial photographic survey. Since 18 September, US warships had questioned the cargo aboard Soviet transport ships. According to Ivan Shishchenko, captain (a lieutenant-colonel in some sources) of an escort subdivision:

... At three o'clock in the morning on 14 September, the Metallurg Baykov cast off from the pier and took the course to the Bosphorus. When the ship approached Istanbul, the pilot boarded the ship. I was worried, a stranger on board, but these are the rules for ships passing through the straits ... On 18 September, two American warships with the numbers 858 and 931 on their sides met us between Sardinia and Tunisia. One had uncovered guns (the crew was standing by at battle stations) and approached to 80–100 meters. The Americans communicated with flag signals:

- What is your ship's destination?
- We are running to Casablanca (an answer ordered by ship captain Vasily Gurzhiy).
- What's on board?
- Agricultural machinery.
- Have a good trip.

The American warship 858 turned away and joined ship number 931, one kilometer away. That day, American reconnaissance aircraft circled our ship at an altitude of 2–3 kilometres (6,600–9,800 ft) and returned to its base in Tunisia. When our ship passed Gibraltar, we received a signal to open an envelope. The envelope contained a form with the name of the actual destination port (Matanzas) and information about the politics and government of Cuba and climatic conditions on the island. In 15 minutes, the officers collected the contents of the envelope. US Air Force reconnaissance aircraft again came within sight near the Azores. On 28 September, as we approached Cuba, an American cargo ship set a collision course with our ship in violation of the rules of navigation. The watch officer reported to Gurzhiy about the collision threat. He immediately issued an order, the ship turned abruptly and ... the collision was avoided ...

The Metallurg Baykov moored at the port of Casilda. On 30 September, Soviet ambassador to Cuba Aleksandr Alekseyev ordered the troops ashore. That night the first convoy was sent to Las Villas province, accompanied by Cuban motorcyclists who attracted the attention of local residents.

According to a 16 August 2012 story in the newspaper Вечерняя Одесса (Evening Odessa), "During the Cuban Missile Crisis in 1962, aircraft from the US and other NATO countries made 1,300 flights over our [Soviet] ships. Their ships, maneuvering in close proximity to our ships, provoked collisions and made 75 attempts to stop our ships for inspection on the open sea."

=== 1980s ===
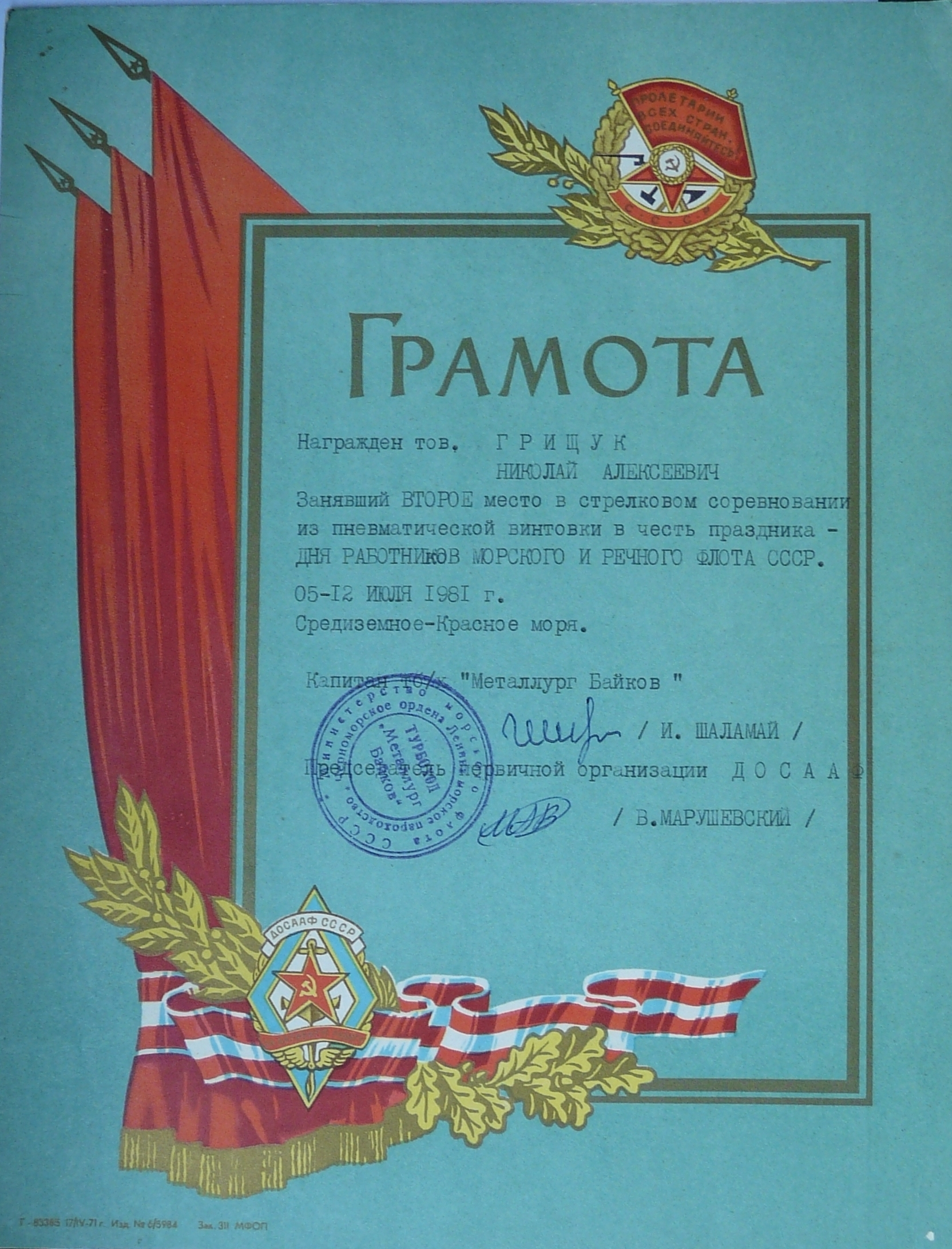
Second-place award in the rifle competition at the first Day of Sea and River Fleet Workers in 1981, signed and stamped with the Metallurg Baykov's stamp by captain I. Shalamay and signed by V. Marushevskiy, the ship's DOSAAF coordinator

The Day of Sea and River Fleet Workers was established by Decree of the Supreme Soviet of the Soviet Union No. 3018-X ("Regarding public holidays and commemorative days") on 1 October 1980 and amended by Decree No. 9724-XI ("Regarding Amendments to the legislation of the USSR regarding holidays and commemorative days") on 1 November 1988. The holiday for sea and river-fleet workers in the USSR was celebrated annually on the first Sunday of July.

Rifle-shooting competitions were held periodically on Soviet merchant ships as a part of DOSAAF programs to provide military training for merchant seamen during the Cold War. A competition in air gun shooting was held on the Metallurg Baykov during Mediterranean and Red Sea voyages from 5–12 July 1981. The ship crossed the equator on 6 July 1984 and received a crossing certificate.

== Fate ==
The Metallurg Baykov was decommissioned at Valencia in 1985, the third Leninsky Komsomol-class cargo ship to be decommissioned and scrapped (after the Fizik Vavilov and the Bratstvo).

== See also ==
- SS Leninsky Komsomol
- SS Metallurg Anosov
- Leninsky Komsomol class cargo ships
