= List of ships named Leninsky Komsomol =

Leninsky Komsomol can refer to the following vessels:

- Soviet submarine K-3 Leninsky Komsomol
- SS Leninsky Komsomol, lead ship of her class of merchant vessels
  - Leninsky Komsomol-class cargo ship - the name of a series of 25 dry cargo merchant tweendeckers with turbine main engines that were built in the USSR.
