= Anosov =

Anosov (masculine, Russian: Аносов) or Anosova (feminine, Russian: Аносова) is a Russian surname. Notable people with the surname include:

- Anosov Pavel Petrovich (Russian: Аносов Павел Петрович) () - Russian scientist-metallurgist
- Dmitri Anosov (1936–2014), Russian Soviet mathematician
  - Anosov diffeomorphism
- Nikolai Anosov (1900–1962), Soviet conductor
- Vitaly Anosov (born 1977), Uzbekistani canoeist

Metallurg Anosov, later renamed to Anosov - Soviet merchant freighter, tweendecker, one of the Leninsky Komsomol class of cargo ships. This cargo ship was buil in 1959.
