= SS Leninsky Komsomol =

Ship built in 1959

History
- Name: Leninsky Komsomol; (Russian: Ленинский Комсомол); Call Sing: UQIM
- Owner: 1959–1988: (Soviet Union) Black Sea Shipping Company, USSR
- Operator: 1959–1988: (Soviet Union) Black Sea Shipping Company
- Port of registry: Dec 1959 – 1988: (Soviet Union) Odessa, USSR; 1988: unknown
- Builder: (Soviet Union) Kherson shipyard
- Launched: 11 of April, 1959. Construction completed including trials, handed over to Black Sea Shipping Co. and put into operation on 23 of December, 1959.
- Renamed: Ungur (Russian: Унгур) on 31 of January, 1986
- Identification: IMO number: 5206166
- Fate: Scrapped in 1988

General characteristics
- Type: freighter, tweendecker
- Tonnage: 11,094 GT; 15,980 DW
- Length: 557 ft (169.9 m)
- Beam: 72 ft (21.8 m)
- Height: 42 ft (12.9 m)
- Draught: 31.9 ft (9.73 m)
- Propulsion: two steam turbine engines driving a single bronze screw propeller diam. 6.3 m (21 ft)
- Crew: 48 crew members, 12 passengers and 8 cadets

Leninsky Komsomol (Russian: Ленинский Комсомол) was a merchant ship of Black Sea Shipping Company (Soviet Union), a tweendecker type freighter with steam turbine engines and the first ship in the Leninsky Komsomol class, project 567. The ship is named in honor of the Komsomol league, which was added by Lenin.

Plenty of newspapers, magazine articles and short stories were written about this ship. This vessel was also mentioned in some books of various writers and in the memories of Soviet Union and United States witnesses.

== Ship's data ==
Project 567 was developed at the Central Design Bureau Chernomorsudoproekt (CDB ChSP) in Nikolayev.
Major designers:

- Bohonevich K.I. (until 1956)
- Sidorov B.K. (1956–1961)

=== Steering gear ===
The rudder is typical, 21 m^{2} (230 sq ft), and hung on hinges. Steering is carried out via an electrohydraulic drive.

=== Anchor and mooring gears ===
- Two bow anchors of Hall design and weighing 5 tons each.
- One stern anchor of Hall design on the starboard side of the stern and weighing 2 tons.
- One spare anchor Hall design and weighing 2 tons.
- Two windlasses on the forecastle for anchor and mooring operations.
- One capstain on the aft mooring station that was used for stern anchor and mooring operations.

=== Cargo holds, speed of cargo operations and cargo safety. ===
- 6 cargo holds and each hold has one tweendeck.
- Dimensions of hatches openings: four hatches 11.9 x 9 m; one 8.3 x 6.0 m; one 9.3 x 7.0 m.

Due to the tweendecker design the ship uses a dehumidification system to avoid cargo damage due to moisture which is particularly high in the tropics.

== History ==
=== Ship's building. ===
After the Kherson Shipyard restoration had been completed on 12 December 1952. The tanker "Kherson" was the first large-tonnage ship and was delivered on 2 December 1952.

During 1957 the main efforts of the shipyard was directed to the construction of the first of a new line of merchant ships for the USSR. From the beginning the pre-production was delayed due to the backlog of the design work in the Nicholayev Central Design Buro "Chernomorsudoproekt", as well as receiving unsatisfactory ship building materials.

The komsomols and youth of Kherson Shipyard took patronage over the construction of the first cargo vessel in new class of ships and committed to pass this ship into operation to the 40th anniversary of Komsomol organization; that meant two months earlier than planned. Due to request of the komsomols and youth of Kherson Shipyard, the Ministry of the Merchant Fleet named this ship Leninsky Komsomol.

The construction of the head freighter begun in the metalworking shop in June 1957. Sectional assembly shop mastered the construction of large sections weighing up to 100 tons. In addition, some problems were created due to the mistakes that were made in the manufacture of the rigging, as well as poorly assembled beds used as support for large sections of the ship.

A change in leadership at the Kherson shipyard occurred in August 1958: the director of the shipyard IG Anatsky I.G. was transferred to work in the Kherson Economic Council, as well as former chief technology officer of the Black Sea Shipyard Zakharov A.N. was appointed the Kherson shipyard director. The new director paid much attention to the construction of the Leninsky Komsomol. The volume of work on the freighter has increased more than 2 times as compared with the tanker.

== See also ==
- Cuban blokade
- Cuban crisis
- SS Metallurg Baykov
- SS Metallurg Anosov
