= SS Fizik Kurchatov =

Ship built in 1962

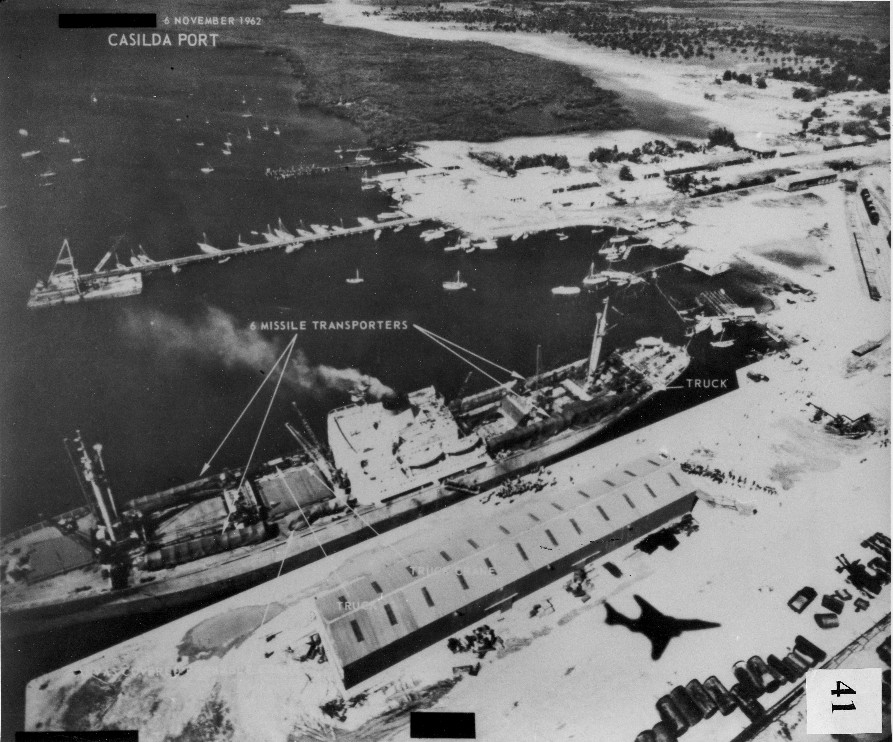
- The Fizik Kurchatov loading missiles in Casilda port. The photo was taken by an RF-101 pilot with the 363rd Tactical Reconnaissance Wing on 6 November 1962. Note the aircraft's shadow.

History
- Name: Fizik Kurchatov; (Russian: Физик Курчатов); Call sign: UYOM; Register number: М-27551; Class formula until 1975: Л *Р4/1С *РСМ; Class formula from 1975: КМ( *)Л3[1]; IMO number: 5404093
- Namesake: Igor Kurchatov
- Owner: June 1962 – 30 April 1986: Black Sea Shipping Company, Soviet Union
- Operator: June 1962 – 30 April 1986: Black Sea Shipping Company, USS
- Port of registry: June 1962 – 30 April 1986: Odesa, Ukraine, USSR; 30 April 1986 - August 1986: George Town, Cayman Islands
- Builder: Kherson Shipyard
- Renamed: Kurchat (home port George Town, Cayman Islands
- Identification: IMO number: 5404093
- Fate: Scrapped at Kaohsiung, China in August 1986

General characteristics
- Type: freighter, tweendecker
- Tonnage: 11,206 GT or 12,127 GT; DWT 16247 mt or 16,225 mt; Displacement 22,225 mt
- Length: 557.7 ft (170.0 m)
- Beam: 72.2 ft (22.0 m)
- Propulsion: Two steam turbine engines driving a single 6.3 m (21 ft) screw propeller
- Speed: 18.5 knots (34.3 km/h; 21.3 mph)
- Capacity: Bale capacity: 20,220 m^{3}; Grain capacity: 23,763 m^{3}

SS Fizik Kurchatov (Russian: Физик Курчатов) was a Leninsky Komsomol-class multi-purpose tweendecker freighter owned by the Soviet Black Sea Shipping Company. She was powered by steam turbine engines. The ship was named after Soviet physicist Igor Kurchatov (1903–1960).

Fizik Kurchatov was one of the Soviet ships which participated in Operation Anadyr, as one of nine Soviet ships which returned missiles to the USSR after the Cuban Missile Crisis, and also took part in the 1973 Arab–Israeli War.

== History ==
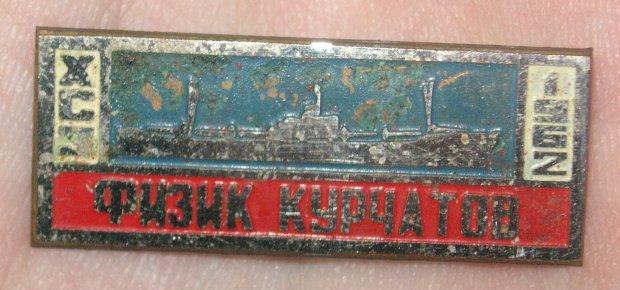
The Fizik Kurchatov on a 1962 commemorative badge

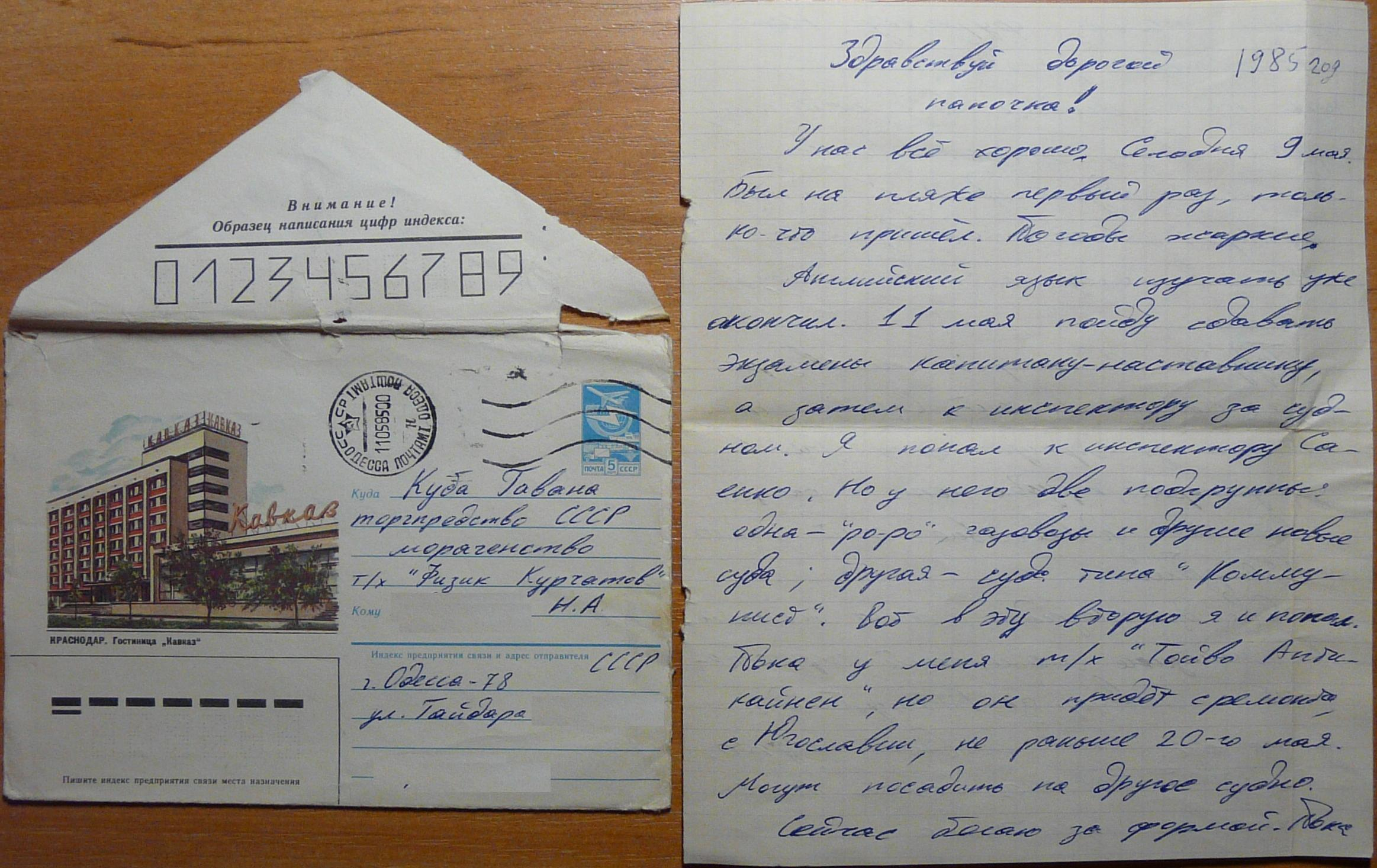
Part of a 9 May 1985 letter from a junior officer on the Toyvo Antikaynen to his father when the father was in Cuba aboard the Fizik Kurchatov. The son wrote that he was awaiting the ship's arrival in the USSR from Yugoslavia.

The Fizik Kurchatov's keel was laid down at the Kherson Shipyard on 20 March 1961. By that time, the shipyard had built seven of her sister ships. The ship was completed in June 1962 and transferred to the Black Sea Shipping Company on 30 June of that year.

=== Operation Anadyr ===
The maiden voyage of the ship was from Nikolayev port to Cuba. The ship loaded cargo in Mykolaiv port. Her cargo was an air defense battalion and its equipment. After unloading in Cuba, the Fizik Kurchatov loaded sugar and returned to the USSR in June 1962. Other sources say that the ship was built in May and delivered to the Black Sea Shipping Company after this voyage.

Some sources say that the Fizik Kurchatov's maiden voyage began before 25 July, when 1,131 tons of general cargo and trucks were loaded on her main deck. Although she sailed from Odessa with Ghana her declared destination, she arrived in Cuba on 7 August.

Her second voyage reportedly began in September 1962, when she loaded 9,500 tons of general cargo (including portions of a missile division) and sailed from Odesa. Oran, an Algerian port, was declared her destination but she arrived in Cuba.

=== Cuban Missile Crisis ===
On 23 October 1962, she was still in Cuba.

The Fizik Kurchatov left Cuba on 7 November 1962, and was photographed by U.S. reconnaissance planes during her return to the Soviet Union. She returned six canvas-covered missiles, which had been aimed at the United States, to the USSR on her open main deck.

=== 1973 Arab–Israeli War ===
The Yom Kippur War, also known as the Ramadan War, the October War and the 1973 Arab–Israeli War, was fought by a coalition of Arab states led by Egypt and Syria against Israel from 6 to 25 October 1973. At least twenty-three Soviet merchant ships carried military cargoes to Syria and Egypt in October and November 1973, including eight Leninsky Komsomol-class cargo ships; the Fizik Kurchatov among them. According to U.S. intelligence, the Fizik Kurchatov made three voyages from Soviet Black Sea ports to Syria and Egypt between October and November 1973:

- Transited the Bosphorus on 9 October and arrived in Alexandria three days later, on 12 October 1973.
- Sailed from the USSR to Syria, transiting the Bosphorus on 23 October and arriving in Latakia two days later, on 25 October.
- Transited the Bosphorus on 10 November and arrived in Alexandria on 13 November 1973.

=== Ethiopian cargo ===
The Fizik Kurchatov delivered P-205 and P-206, two Zhuk-class patrol boats, to Ethiopia in October 1982 when the Soviet Union supplied the African country's new fleet.

== Fate ==
The Fizik Kurchatov was renamed the Kurchat and her home port became George Town, Cayman Islands on 30 April 1986. She was scrapped in Kaohsiung, China in August of that year.

== See also ==
- United States embargo against Cuba
