= Day of Sea and River Fleet Workers =

Professional holiday in Russia

The Day of Sea and River Fleet Workers or the Sea and River Fleet Worker's Day (Russian: День работников морского и речного флота) – a professional holiday of sea and river fleet workers in the USSR, which was celebrated annually on the first Sunday of each July since 1981.

== Holiday history ==
=== Whether there was a similar holiday in the Soviet Union until 1981? ===
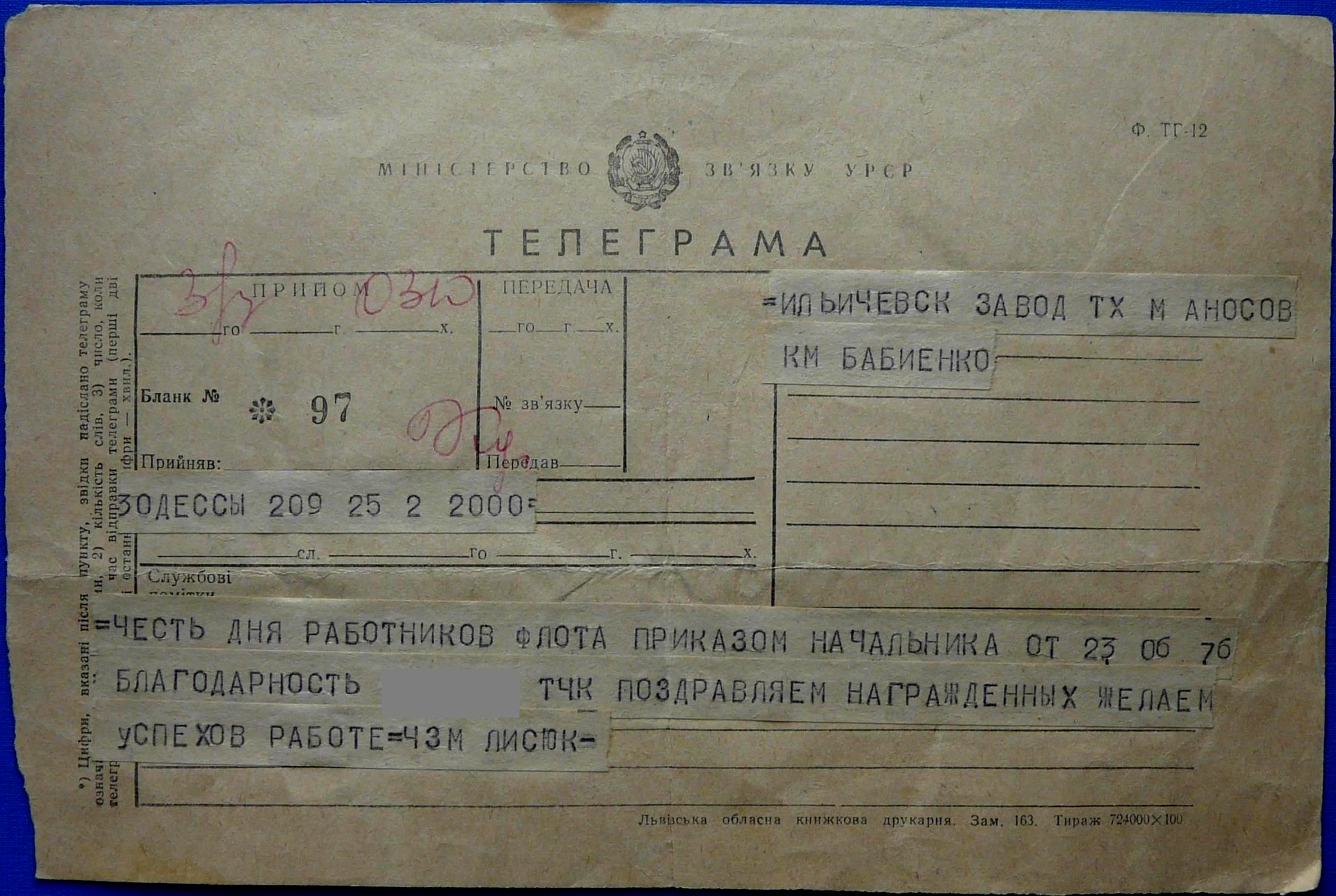
The telegram from the Deputy of the Head of the Black Sea Shipping Company to the ship Anosov. The Deputy was abbreviated to "ЧЗМ" and the Black Sea Shipping Company was abbreviated as "ЧМП". The teleram dated 25 of June 1976.

In the Soviet Union, Navy Day was established by the Decree of the Council of People's Commissars of the USSR and the Central Committee of the VKPB dated 22 of June, 1939. The Soviet Navy Day was celebrated on the Last Sunday of June annually from 1939.

Workers of the Soviet Merchant Fleet, including the sailors, had not own holiday. However, the Day of the Soviet Navy, which was celebrated on the Last Sunday of June annually from 1939, was considered as the Day of All Workers of the Soviet Fleet in the Black Sea Shipping Company in 1970-s or before also and can be in other Soviet Shipping Companies also. The Black Sea Shipping Company had own reasons to celebrate it due to the ships of this shipping company took the largest share in the shipping of military cargoes of the Soviet Union, including the Cuban blockade breaking and to tropical and temperate ports in allied countries. But commercial sailors did not celebrate this day, on the Last Sunday of June, due to they did not consider it as own celebrate. However, congratulatory telegrams from the management of the Black Sea Shipping Company followed in the address of the ships and seafarers, to see the right:

"In honor of the Fleet Day and by the Head's order dated 26 of June 1976, the gratitude to (surname). Congratulations to the awardees and wish success during the works. ЧЗМ Lisyuk."

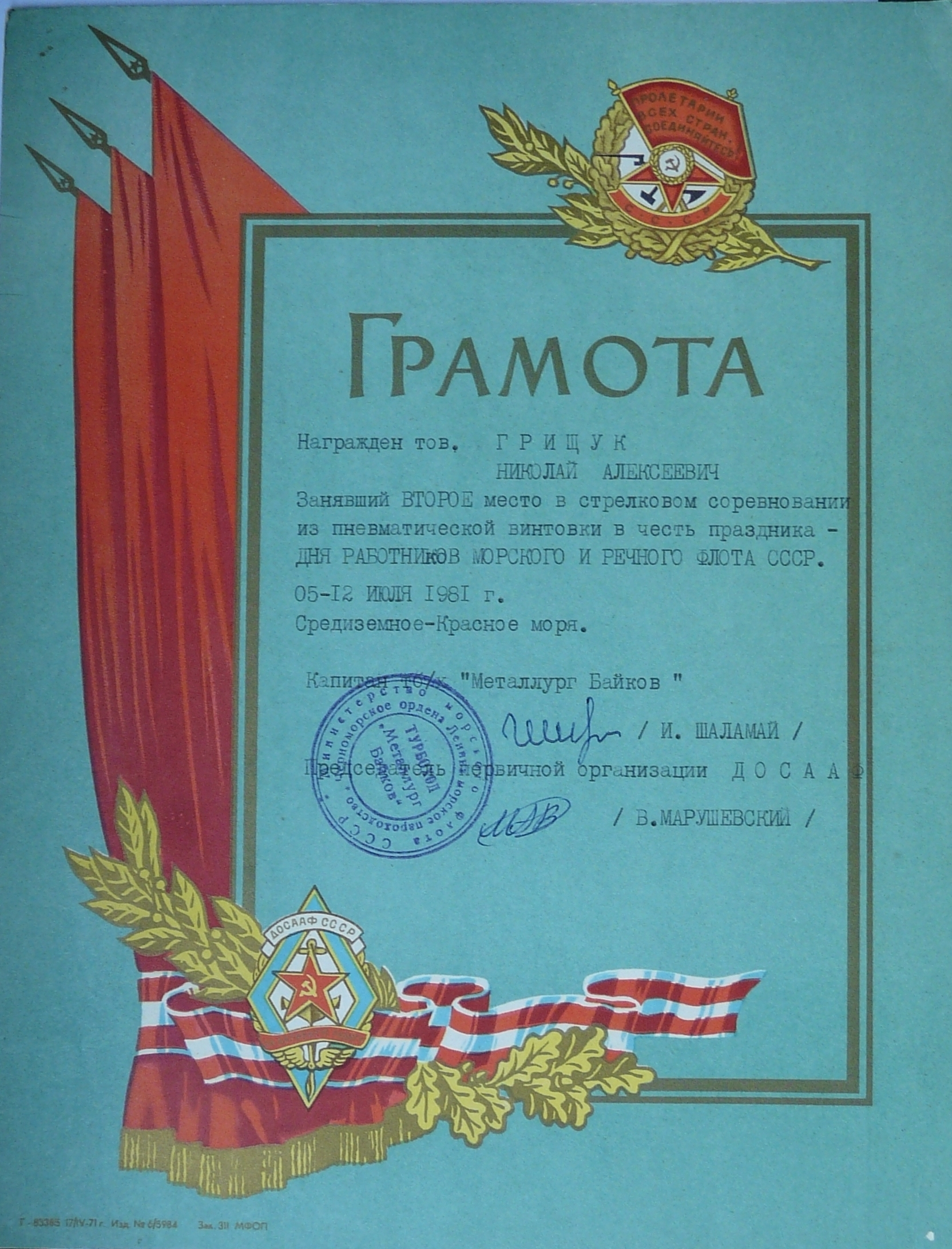
The diploma for the second place in the competition in pneumatic rifle shooting on the Soviet ship Metallurg Baykov in July 1981. It was the first celebration of the Day of Sea and River Workers in the USSR.

=== Holiday history from 1981 till beginning of 1990-s ===
The Soviet Navy Day was canceled by the Presidium of the Supreme Soviet on the 1-st of October, 1980, and commenced to celebrate it on the Last Sunday of July annually from 1981. The Russian Federation Navy Day was reestablished by the Decree of the President of Russia Vladimir Putin on 31 of May 2006.

The Day of Sea and River Fleet Workers of the Soviet Union was founded by the Decree of the Supreme Soviet of the Soviet Union № 3018-X "Regarding public holidays and commemorative days" dated the 1 of October, 1980, as amended by the Decree of the Supreme Soviet of the Soviet Union № 9724-XI "Regarding Amendments to the legislation of the USSR regarding holidays and commemorative days" dated 1 of November, 1988.

The first celebration of the Day of Sea and River Fleet Workers fell in the Soviet Union on 5 July 1981, first Sunday in July of this year, and this Day was celebrated on some ships of Black Sea Shipping Company, with various competitions. So, it was celebrated on the ship Metallurg Baykov of the Black Sea Shipping Company with the competition in pneumatic rifle shooting in honor of the Day of Sea and River Fleet Workers celebration and this competicion was also a part of the DOSAAF program as a part of the military training for civil seamen due to Cold War period. - To see the Diploma on the right.

=== After the Soviet Union collapse ===
In the beginning of 1990s, after the Soviet Union collapse, this holiday was preserved in the Russian Federation and in Ukraine.

In Ukraine this holiday (Ukrainian: День працівників морського та річкового флоту) was established and confirmed by Decree of the President of Ukraine "Regarding the Day of Sea and River Fleet" № 236/93 dated 29 June 1993, "... to promote the initiative of sea and river fleet workers of Ukraine ...". It was celebrated in Ukraine on the First Sunday of July annually and from 1993 to 2008.

The Day of Sea and River Fleet Workers in Ukraine and the Day of Naval Forces of Ukraine were cancelled with resumption of the Day of Sea and River Fleet Workers and military men of Ukrainian Navy as the Fleet of Ukraine Day by Decree of the President of Ukraine "Regarding the Fleet of Ukraine Day" № 1053/2008 dated 18 November 2008.

=== International Day of the Seafarers ===
In 2010, the IMO adopted the decision to celebrate the International Day of the Seafarers on 25 June annually.
