= Kherson Shipyard =

Harbour in Ukraine

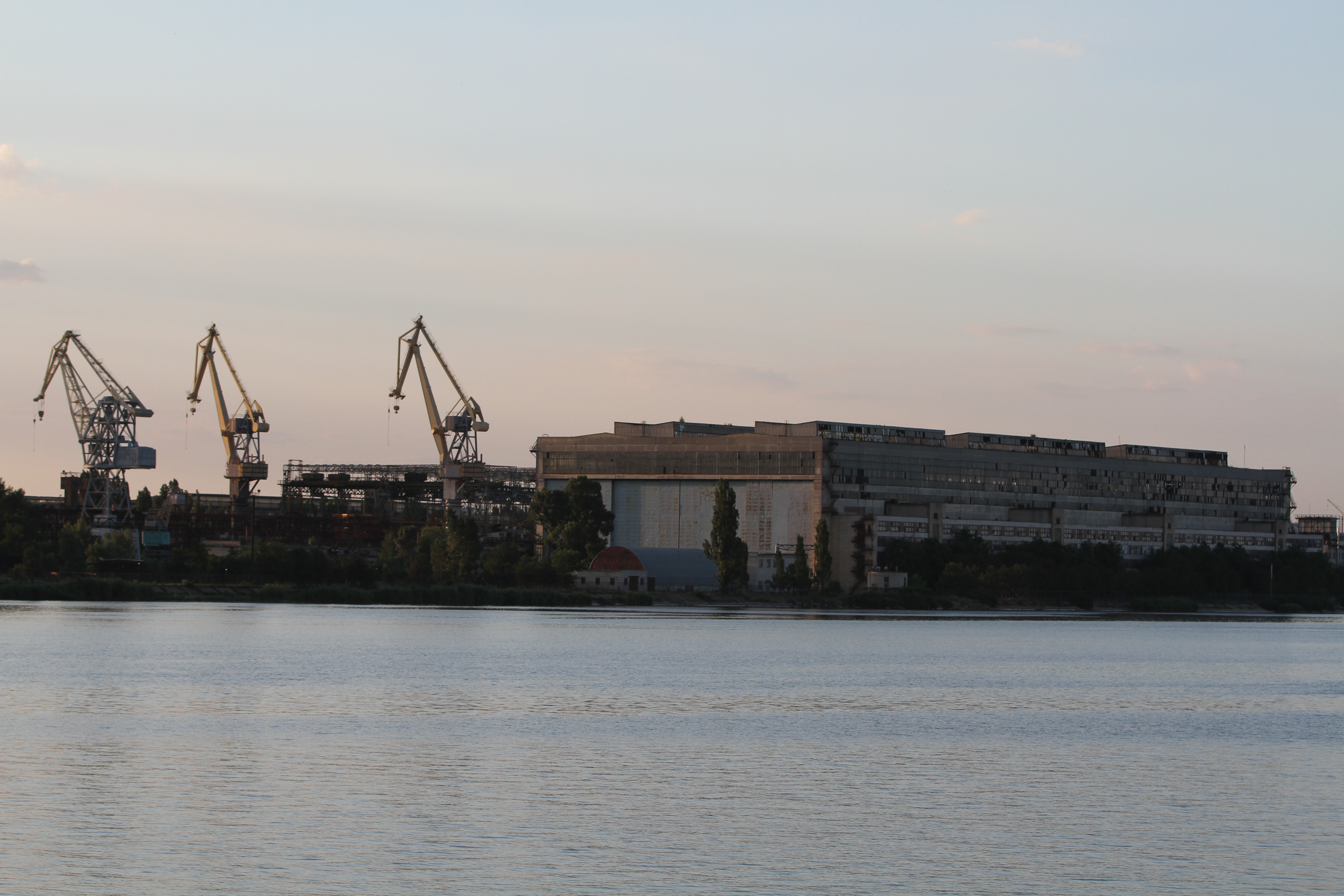
Part of Kherson Shipyard

The Kherson Shipyard (Ukrainian: Херсонський суднобудівний завод, ХСЗ) is a joint stock company located in Kherson, Ukraine, at the mouth of the Dnieper River. The shipyard specializes in building merchant ships to include dry cargo ships, tankers, ice-breakers, container-ships, drilling vessels, and floating dry docks. In 1983, the shipyard delivered the impressive Alexei Kosygin class (named after Soviet Premier Alexei Kosygin) of Arctic barge carriers (40,900 tons deadweight (DWT)).

== History ==
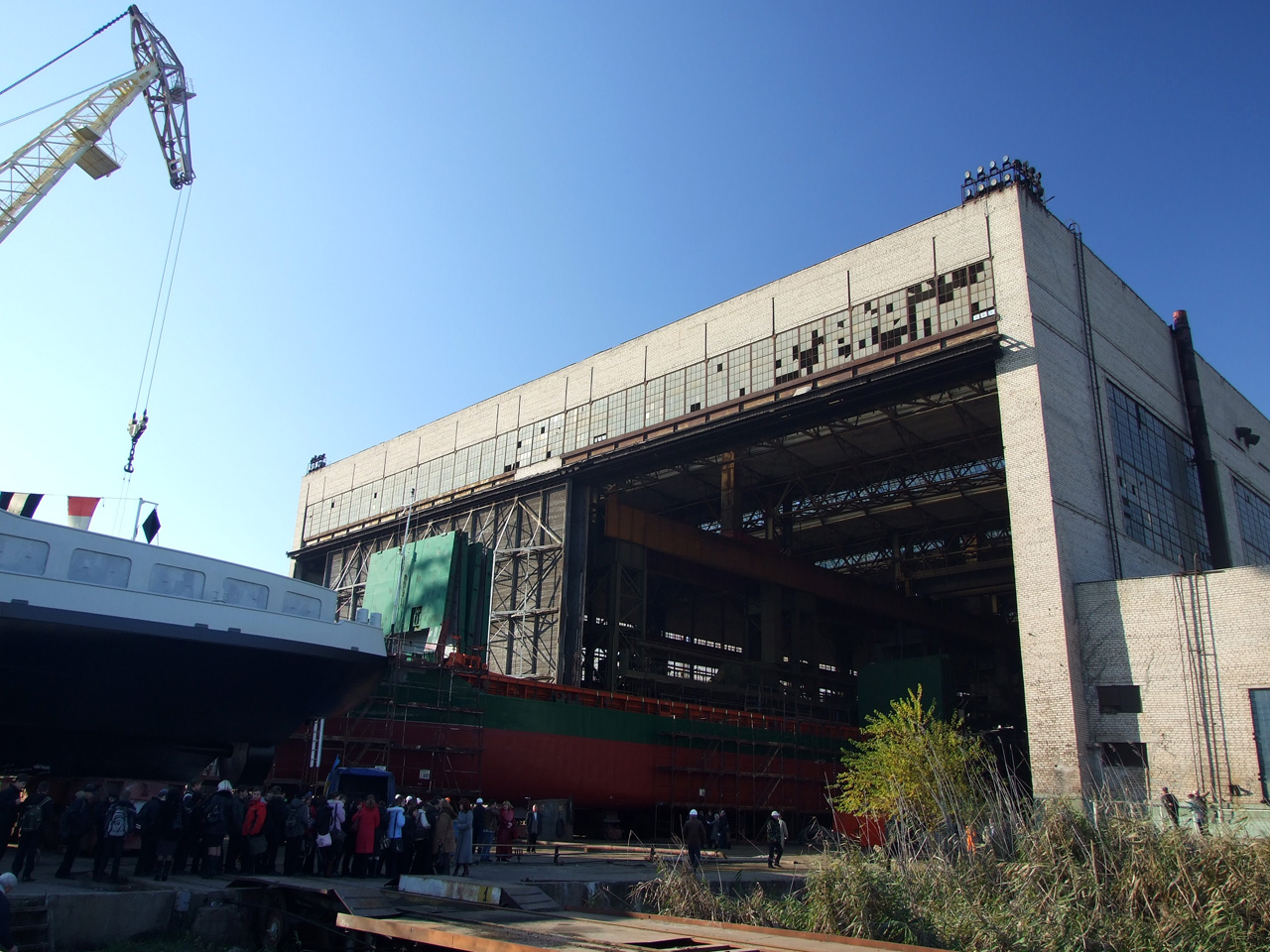
A factory building and vessels

The city of Kherson was founded in 1778 at a fortress that protected the lands of Russian Empire from Turkish raids. Kherson's proximity to the Black Sea initiated shipbuilding and the settlement of people in the estuary of the Dnieper river.

Kherson Shipyard was founded in 1951. The first Soviet tanker ships, Kherson and Grozny, were completed there in 1953. A few years later, the production of dry cargo ships began. In 1965, one of the first ocean-going dry cargo gas turbines in the former Soviet Union, the Paris Commune, was built at the plant. In 1970, the main Soviet icebreaker and transport vessel, Captain Myshevsky, was built at the shipyard.

During Ukraine's independence, Kherson Shipyard built about 25 ships, including 13 tankers for shipowners in Norway, Denmark, Russia, two Arctic supply vessels for clients in South Africa and China, and four multi-purpose dry cargo ships for the Philippines and Norway.

In 2010, the plant was engaged in the construction of a series of anchor vessels for the Norwegian company Myklebust Prosjekt AS, as well as ship repair and production of river tankers for the Dutch company Veka Shipbuilding BV.

In autumn 2019, the company is carrying out preparatory work for the installation of equipment for thermal cutting of metal SAPPHIRE of the Polish company "ECKERT".

== Facilities and services ==
The shipyard consists of two main production areas:

- Production Area No. 1 is where units up to 2,000 tons are formed in what is called the Large Unit Building to be further moved on to the building berth (two building berth lines, each 300 meters (980 ft) long).
- Production Area No. 2 is where hull forming is carried out in a roofed building berth on two building berth lines each 240 meters (790 ft) long.

	Length	Width	Draft	Launching weight
Area No. 1	180–185 meters (590 1/2—607 ft)	25.5 meters (84 ft)	4.5 meters (15 ft)	10,000 tons
Area No. 2	140–160 meters (460–520 ft)	32.5 meters (107 ft)	4.0 meters (13.1 ft)	6,000 tons
3 outfitting quays	-	-	-	-

The hull assembling and metal processing facilities performs pre-processing of rolled metal to include straightening, shot-blasting, priming, cutting, and bending. Specific capabilities include:

- Straightening and shot-blasting of rolled metal plates up to 50 millimeters (2.0 in) thick; the plasma and gas cutting machines can cut metal plates up to 16 centimeters (6.3 in) thick.
- Bending of metal plates up to 50 millimetres (2.0 in) thick of all types and shapes, including shaped bends by profile gauge and frame work, bottom stamping of plates up to 10 millimeters (0.39 in) thick, with diameters ranging from 350 to 800 millimeters (14 to 31 in).
- Assembly and welding of flat sections sizing 16 by 25.3 meters (52 ft × 83 ft) and volumetric units up to 85–180 tons. Production of sections and units facilitated by using 5 to 125 tons overhead cranes and semi- and fully automatic welding equipment.

== Notable vessels ==
Notable vessels Imperial Russian Navy (1696–1917) • Soviet Navy (1917–1991) • Russian Navy (1991–2005)
Name	Laid	Launched / Completed	Class (NATO)	Type
Херсон; Kherson		1953		First Soviet tanker ship
Грозный; Grozny		1953		First Soviet tanker ship
Ленинский Комсомол; Leninsky Komsomol	1957	1959	Leninsky Komsomol class cargo ships	General cargo ship
Металлург Байков; Metallurg Baykov	1958	1960	Leninsky Komsomol class cargo ships	General cargo ship
Металлург Курако; Metallurg Kurako	1959	1961	Leninsky Komsomol class cargo ships	General cargo ship
Юрий Гагарин; Yuriy Gagarin	1959	1961	Leninsky Komsomol class cargo ships	General cargo ship
Металлург Бардин; Metallurg Bardin		1961	Leninsky Komsomol class cargo ships	General cargo ship
Хирург Вишневский; Khirurg Vishnevsky	1961	1962	Leninsky Komsomol class cargo ships	General cargo ship
Химик Зелинский; Khimik Zelinsky	20 March 1961	June 1962	Leninsky Komsomol class cargo ships	General cargo ship
Физик Курчатов; Fizik Kurchatov	1961	1962	Leninsky Komsomol class cargo ships	General cargo ship
Металлург Аносов; Metallurg Anosov		29 September 1962	Leninsky Komsomol class cargo ships	General cargo ship
Красная Пресня; Krasnay Presnya		16 December 1962	Leninsky Komsomol class cargo ships	General cargo ship
Трансбалт; Transbalt		29 December 1962	Leninsky Komsomol class cargo ships	General cargo ship
Красный Октябрь; Krasnyi Oktyabr		23 May 1963	Leninsky Komsomol class cargo ships	General cargo ship
Валентина Терешкова; Valentina Nereshkova		30 June 1963	Leninsky Komsomol class cargo ships	General cargo ship
Равенство; Ravenstvo		30 September 1963	Leninsky Komsomol class cargo ships	General cargo ship
Братство; Bratstvo	20 September 1962	29 December 1963	Leninsky Komsomol class cargo ships	General cargo ship
Свобода; Svoboda		12 March 1964	Leninsky Komsomol class cargo ships	General cargo ship
Академик Шиманский; Akademik Shimansky		27 June 1964	Leninsky Komsomol class cargo ships	General cargo ship
Кремль; Kreml		28 September 1964	Leninsky Komsomol class cargo ships	General cargo ship
Парижская Коммуна; Parizhskaya Kommuna	25 июня 1964	December 1965 / 17 December 1968	Leninsky Komsomol class cargo ships	General cargo ship
Юный Ленинец; Yunyi Leninets		30 December 1964	Leninsky Komsomol class cargo ships	General cargo ship

== See also ==
- List of ships of Russia by project number
- List of Soviet and Russian submarine classes
