= SS Bratstvo =

Ship

History
- Name: Bratstvo; (Russian: Братство); Call sign: UDXO; Register number: М-27595; Class formula until 1975: Л *Р4/1С *РСМ; Class formula from 1975: КМ( *)Л3[1]; IMO number: 6405044
- Namesake: Leninsky Komsomol class cargo ships, projects 567 and 567К
- Owner: 29 December 1963 – March 1985: Black Sea Shipping Company, (Soviet Union) USSR
- Operator: 29 December 1963 – March 1985: Black Sea Shipping Company, USSR
- Port of registry: 29 December 1963 – March 1985: Odessa, USSR
- Builder: Kherson Shipyard (number 1215)
- Laid down: 20 September 1962
- Fate: Scrapped in Algeciras, Spain in 1985.

General characteristics
- Type: Freighter, tweendecker
- Tonnage: 11,521 GT or 11,509 GT; DWT 16186 mt; Summer DWT 16230 mt
- Length: 557.7 ft (170.0 m) abt
- Beam: 72.2 ft (22.0 m) abt
- Propulsion: Two steam turbine engines driving a single 6.3 m (21 ft) screw propeller

The SS Bratstvo (Russian: Братство) was a multi-purpose tweendecker freighter owned by the Black Sea Shipping Company in the Soviet Union. It was a Leninsky Komsomol-class cargo ship, with steam-turbine engines, and was built in accordance with the specifications of Projects 567 and 567K.

== Construction ==
Its keel was laid on 20 September 1962, the ship was completed in December 1963 and the Bratstvo was delivered to the Black Sea Shipping Company on 29 December of that year.

== Early voyages ==
Due to the closure of the Suez Canal from June 1967 to summer 1975, the Bratstvo sailed around Africa on her voyages to the Indian Ocean or Far Eastern ports and sailed to Cuba and Syria. The ship sailed from Antwerp on 19 January 1973, bound for North Korea via Las Palmas and around Africa. In 1974 she sailed from the Black Sea to Umm Qasr, Iraq, a voyage which again took her around the Cape of Good Hope. The ship stopped at Cape Town for bunkering.

== Yom Kippur War ==
The Yom Kippur War, also known as the Ramadan War, October War and the 1973 Arab–Israeli War, was fought by a coalition of Arab states led by Egypt and Syria against Israel from 6 to 25 October 1973. Twenty-three Soviet merchant ships carried military cargo to Syria and Egypt in October and early November of that year. The Bratstvo was one of eight Leninsky Komsomol-class cargo ships which participated in the transport. According to the United States, the Bratstvo visited Syria once—sailing from the Black Sea, passing through the Bosphorus on 18 October and arriving at Latakia on 20 October. The merchant seamen were witnesses to and participants in the war, since the ports were bombed by the Israeli Air Force. When the Bratstvo arrived in Syria on 20 October, she was unloaded despite the air raids.

== Final voyage ==
The Bratstvo, carrying a bulk shipment of Canadian wheat, sailed from Port-Cartier bound for Odessa in early September 1984. When the ship passed the Strait of Gibraltar, she visited Ceuta for fresh water and bunkering. After fresh water and fuel were supplied to the ship, the Bratstvo left Ceuta for Odessa on 18 September. When the ship passed the port gates, she changed course to 98 degrees and her speed was 14.0 knots. The weather was favorable and the night visibility good, about 4 miles (6.4 km).

=== Incident ===
At 23:33 local time on 18 September, a severe concussion occurred aboard the Bratstvo. According to the memoirs of Captain Vadim Fillipovich Demchenkov, it felt like an explosion across the ship. Within 50 seconds, the ship's engine room was flooded up to the main deck.

The three-man watch escaped the engine room up the ladders when they were knee- to waist-deep in water. The second engineer, hearing the alarm, closed off the engine room. The capacity of the ship was at least 1,500 tons. If it filled with seawater, it would have been lost. She remained afloat due to calm seas and the grain's remaining intact.

— Captain Vadim Fillipovich Demchenkov

Although the captain's memoirs indicate his belief that the ship should have sunk within a minute of the disaster, it did not capsize as expected. The engine room was flooded and the turbine generator had stopped, but the emergency diesel generator was started in 20 seconds. This, and the disruption of the ship's internal lighting for only 30–40 seconds, allowed the crew to evacuate. In 10 minutes, the lifeboats were lowered into the water and all crew members escaped.

The crew was near the abandoned ship. After a quick SOS signal, other vessels came to the aid of the Bratstvo. The Bulgarian transport ship Pyatiero iz PMS arrived first. Her crew lowered their ship's motor-boat into the water, and its engine stalled; the captain did not take the Soviet seamen aboard until the engine could be started and the Soviet crew was towed to the Bulgarian ship. The Bulgarian crew welcomed each bratooshka. The Soviet ship Kapitan Medvyedev soon reached the scene and took the Soviet sailors.

Although the crew had abandoned the Bratstvo, a lifeboat was moored at the side of the ship to prevent looting. The captain and the chief radioman boarded her periodically to communicate with the shipping company. Her crew found a Spanish tug-boat, which towed the waterlogged ship to the Bay of Gibraltar onto a shallow sand bank. Demchenkov said, "Until the Spanish diver emerged from the flooded engine room, showed us pieces of rubber and shouted 'Russian submarine', everyone thought it was an explosion."

The hole in the Bratstvo was 100 square metres (1,100 sq ft): 5 metres (16 ft) above the keel and 20 metres (66 ft) long. It was later learned that a Soviet submarine accidentally struck the ship with its nose at the end of the third hold, damaging the engine room.

=== Soviet Navy version ===
Admiral Arkady Mikhailovsky, commander of the Soviet Navy Northern Fleet and a Hero of the Soviet Union, was called by the Northern Fleet chief of staff and Vice-Admiral Vadim Konstantinovich Korobov on 19 September and informed of the incident. According to the Soviet Navy, the commander of submarine K-53 (the submarine which rammed the Bratstvo) did not report the incident for nine hours. This failure to report led to the first news of the collision arriving from the Soviet Ministry of Foreign Affairs, which had received the intelligence from the Spanish government; the normal route of information would have been the Ministry of Defence. The central command of the general staff remained uninformed, since no alarm from the submarine had been received. K-53's eventual reporting of the incident evoked the indignation of Defence Minister Dmitry Ustinov and a dressing-down (Russian: втык) of Chief Commander and Fleet Admiral Sergey Gorshkov.

=== Summary ===
The Bratstvo collided with the Soviet Victor I-class submarine K-53 at the exit of the Strait of Gibraltar in the Alboran Sea on 18 (ship time) or 19 (submarine time) September 1984 and was towed to Algeciras to be scrapped. The incident was described differently by three parties: the crew of the Bratstvo, the crew of K-53 and the Soviet Navy. Until the dissolution of the Soviet Union, the Bratstvo was listed as decommissioned after an explosion due to engine failure. During the early 2000s, declassified information and reports from involved seamen detailed the actual events of September 1984. The Bratstvo was decommissioned in March 1985 and scrapped in Algeciras that year.

== Crew ==
Anatoliy Matveyevich Romanov, staff master of the Bratstvo, died in 2011. Viktor Snisarenko worked aboard the Bratstvo from 1969 to 1983, rising from junior deck officer to master of the ship. Vladimir Filipovich Demchenkov was the ship's captain in 1984, when the collision occurred.
