= Leninsky Komsomol-class cargo ship =

Class of Soviet Union merchant ships

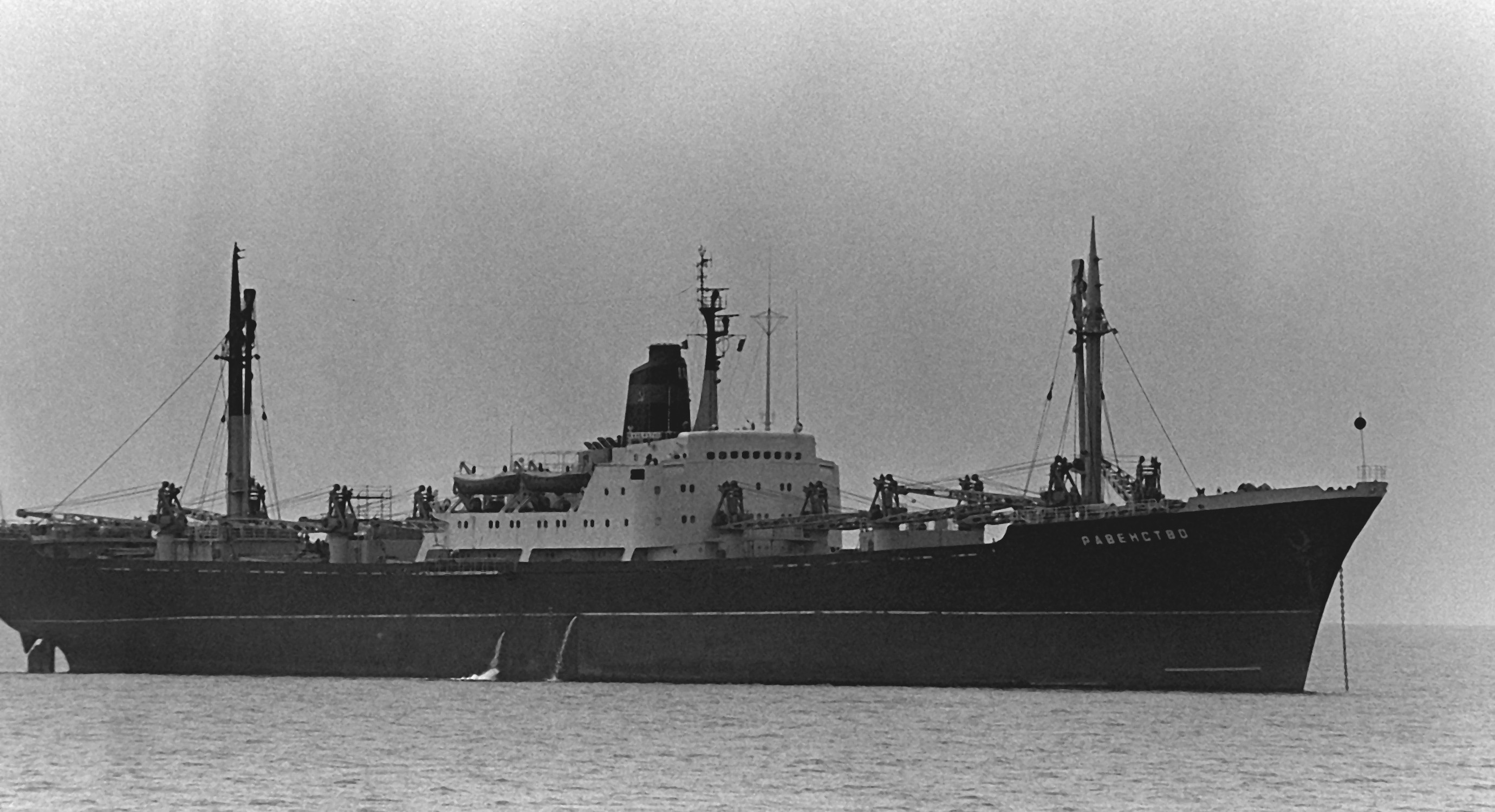
- Ravenstvo at anchor in July 1979

Class overview
- Builders: Kherson Shipyard; Nikolayev Shipyard
- Operators: Black Sea Shipping Company; Soviet Navy
- Completed: 25
- Scrapped: 25

General characteristics
- Tonnage: 11,926 gross tons; 16,185 DWT; 13,270 GRT; 6,866 NRT
- Displacement: 2225 т (Leninsky Komsomol)
- Length: 169.9 m (557 ft) - 179 m (587 ft)
- Beam: 21.8 m (72 ft) - 22.6 m (74 ft)
- Draught: 19.73 m (64.7 ft) - 12 m (39 ft)
- Depth: 12.9 m (42 ft) - 16 m (52 ft)
- Propulsion: Steam turbine (gas turbine in Parizhskaya Kommuna); 13000/14300 hp
- Speed: 18.2 knots - 20.5 knots
- Range: 12,000 miles
- Capacity: 19,925 m³ (bale capacity); 23,355 m³ (bulk capacity)
- Complement: 35-51

The Leninsky Komsomol class (also transliterated as Leninskiy Komsomol or Leninskij Komsomol (Russian: тип Ленинский Комсомол) is a class of 25 ocean-going dry cargo ships, tweendeckers with turbine main engines, built between 1959 and 1968 in the Soviet Union under the designations Projects 567 and 567K. Twenty were built by the Kherson Shipyard, and five in either the Nikolayev Shipyard, or the Nosenko Shipyard in Nikolayev. They were part of a program to modernize the Soviet Union's merchant fleet.

Three forms of transliteration of the Russian name are used in English-language sources:

- Leninsky Komsomol – the official registered English name of the first ship of this class, used as the name of the class of as a whole.
- Leninskiy Komsomol – an alternative transliteration sometimes used in press or literature after 1975. It is also the official registered English name of a river vessel built after 1975.
- Leninskij Komsomol – an alternative transliteration.

The Leninsky Komsomol-class ships were the first merchant ships of the Soviet Union to have turbine engines. They were called "turbo-runners" in news reports and by seamen.

The class was named after the lead ship, the Leninsky Komsomol. This first vessel was laid on 25 September 1957 and was handed over to Black Sea Shipping Company on 23 December 1959. The last ship in the class was named Parizhskaya Kommuna (Russian: Парижская Коммуна) which was taken into operation on 17 December 1968. This was the third largest class of ship in Black Sea Shipping Company by number of ships in the class. The Parizhskaya Kommuna was the first Soviet merchant ship with controllable pitch propeller and the largest ship with gas-turbine main engines in the world at the time of her launching.

The Leninsky Komsomol-class ships were excellent for transatlantic traffic. Their speed, manoeuvrability and seaworthiness forced foreign experts to pay attention to the design. The ships had high freeboard and, because of this, excellent stability and seaworthiness.

== Development and operational history ==
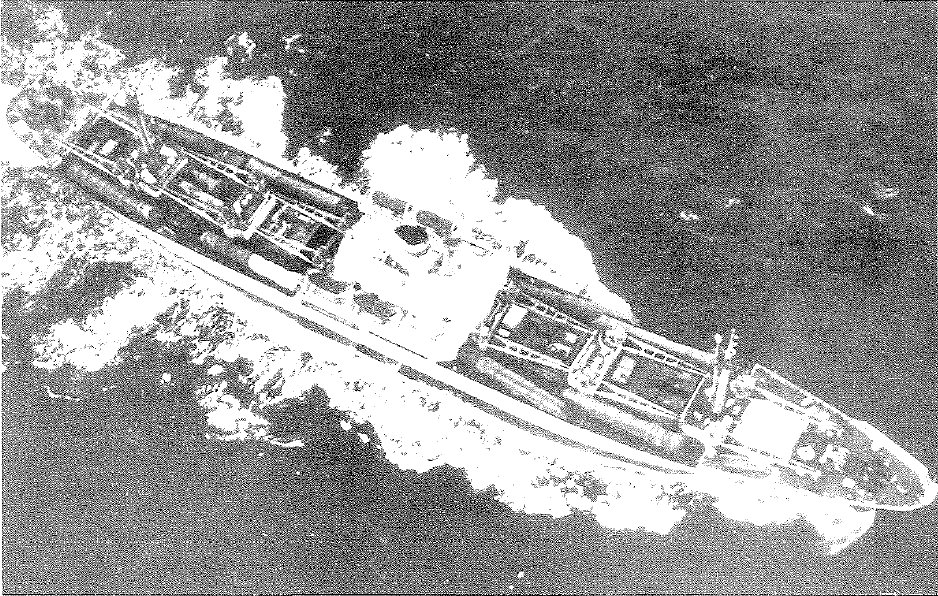
Metallurg Anosov departing Cuba on November 7, 1962. Her deck cargo of eight missile transporters with canvas-covered missiles is visible.

Project 567 was developed at the Central Design Bureau Chernomorsudoproekt (CDB ChSP) in Nikolayev. The main designers were K. I. Bohonevich, B. K. Sidorov and F. V. Sibir'.

Ships of this class were designed for use:

1. as merchant ships during peacetime;
2. as "blockade runners" in case of a blockade of friendly states;
3. as fast troop transports in wartime, after their mobilization, arming and commissioning in the Soviet Navy

The Leninsky Komsomol-class cargo ships were a continuation of a tradition already established in Russian and Soviet shipbuilding. Ships built with a dual purpose in Russia dated back to the age of sailing ships and the paddle steamer fleet. Russia had been defeated in the Crimean War of 1853–1856, and the terms of the resulting Treaty of Paris prohibited Russia from maintaining a naval force in the Black Sea. This led to the practice of building merchant ships with extra strength and speed that operated under the flags of the Russian Steam Navigation and Trading Company (ROPIT), the Voluntary Fleet (Dobroflot), and other shipping companies of the Russian Empire during peacetime. These vessels could be quickly mobilised for military duty in wartime, with 200 merchant ships mobilised for service with the Imperial Russian Navy after the outbreak of the First World War in just the Black Sea.

During the Soviet period shipbuilders built several types of high-speed (for that time) ocean-going cargo ships with dual-purpose-use. The Leninsky Komsomol class had a deadweight of 16 thousand tons, with six holds and six tweendecks, with cabins for one or two crewmembers each. They were built in Nikolayev and Kherson. A ship class is often called by the name of the first ship of the class to be launched or delivered. In this instance the first ship was named Leninsky Komsomol. This was most likely due to the influence of the KGB, which had a strong interest in building such ships and was led consistently by former Komsomol leaders, such as Alexander Shelepin and Vladimir Semichastny. The phenomenon of former Komsomol workers working in the KGB was termed Shelepintsy, and included Vladimir Semichastny, N. N. Mesyatsev and others.

The Leninsky Komsomol class demonstrated the expertise of the Soviet Black Sea shipbuilders and the increased level of the Soviet shipbuilding industry. All of the class were initially operated by the Black Sea Shipping Company, homeported in Odessa. By the early 1980s the Black Sea Shipping Company included 270 ocean-going ships, and was ranked as the world's largest shipping company by number of vessels, due to the construction of ships in the 1960s and 1970s. Three Leninsky Komsomol class cargo ships were transferred to the Soviet Navy in 1985–1986 for use as large dry-cargo transports:

- Ravenstvo was transferred in 1985.
- Akademik Szymanskiy and Leninsky Pioner were transferred in 1986.

=== Use in military transportation ===
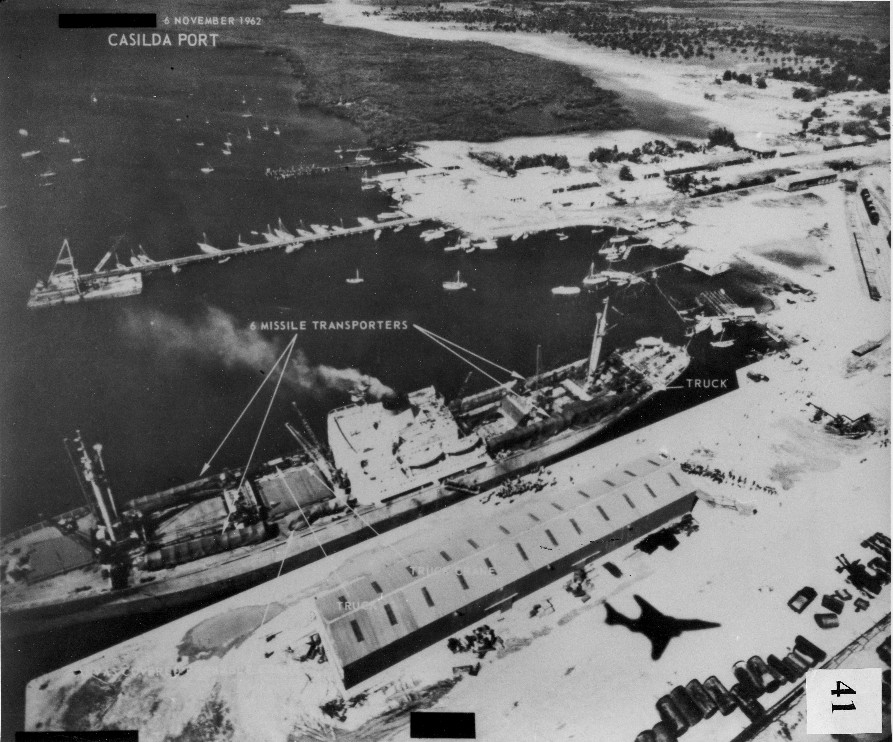
The Fizik Kurchatov in Casilda port. The photograph was taken by an RF-101 pilot with the 363rd Tactical Reconnaissance Wing on November 6, 1962. The shadow of the aircraft is visible.

Leninsky Komsomol-class ships were used as a "blockade runners" during "Operation Anadyr", the Soviet effort to break the Cuba blockade during the Cuban Missile Crisis. 57 ships of the Black Sea Shipping Company were involved in breaking the blockade. An additional 34 vessels from Baltic Shipping Company, the Murmansk Shipping Company, the Latvian Shipping Company and the Far Eastern Shipping Company also participated. Leninsky Komsomol-class ships were later used to carry military cargo to Angola, Vietnam and other countries in conflict zones during the Cold War.

During the 1973 Arab-Israeli War, eight Soviet Leninsky Komsomol-class ships carried military cargoes to Syria and Egypt in October and early November 1973:

1. Leninsky Komsomol - arrived in Alexandria on 28 October 1973.
2. Fizik Kurchatov - visited Alexandria twice and Latakia once.
3. Bratstvo - arrived in Latakia on 20 October 1973.
4. Khimik Zelinskiy
5. Krasnyy Oktyabr
6. Leninsky Pioner
7. Yunyi Leninets
8. Parizhskaya Kommuna

Other classes of merchant ship carried military cargoes to Syria and Egypt during this period, but more Leninsky Komsomol-class ships were involved in these operations than any other class of Soviet merchant ship.

== Design ==
Project 567 was developed at the Central Design Bureau Chernomorsudoproekt (CDB ChSP) in Nikolayev.
Major designers:

- K. I. Bohonevich (until 1956)
- B. K. Sidorov (1956–1961)
- F. V. Sibir' (from 1961)

A total of 25 ships were built. Twenty of the ships were built at the Kherson Shipyard and a further five at the Nikolayev Shipyard, or the Nosenko Shipyard in Nikolayev under the Soviet merchant fleet modernization program. The first ship was laid down in 1957 and was completed and handed over in December 1959. The last ship was completed and handed over in 1968.

Outwardly the Leninsky Komsomol-class resembled the US Mariner class, with their cargo derricks and their superstructure divided into three structures (a long forecastle, central accommodation structure, and aftcastle), the engine room in the centre, a sloping bow, and a cruiser stern. The Leninsky Komsomol-class ships were roughly the same length as the American vessels, but were less broad beamed.

The ships were classed as multipurpose tweendeckers and as dry cargo freighters. All were powered by steam-turbines, with the exception of the gas-turbine-powered SS Parizhskaya Communa. They had two decks in the tweendecker style, and their superstructure in three blocks. Their general purpose was the carriage of general and grain cargoes.

=== Specifications ===
The ships of the class were between 169.9 m (557 ft) and 179 m (587 ft) long, with a beam of between 21.8 m (72 ft) and 22.6 m (74 ft). Their moulded depth amidships varied between 12.9 m (42 ft) and 16 m (52 ft), and their draught from approximately 9,739 m (31,952 ft) and 12 m (39 ft). The dimensions and tonnage of each ship varied slightly from her sisters, but shape of the hull and the proportions were the same. A new and improved hull design was developed for the Leninsky Komsomol class. The design proved successful and was used in the construction of later classes of Soviet merchant ships. including those of the Slavyansk and Kapitany classes. Some variations in the later designs included the placing of the superstructure closer to the stern, and reducing the number of hold compartments to five larger ones. The design was continually refined and improved as the ships were being built, using lessons learned from preceding ships. The cargo booms used on the earlier ships were replaced with brand new Soviet-made cargo cranes on those built after 1961. But generally the overall design remained the same.

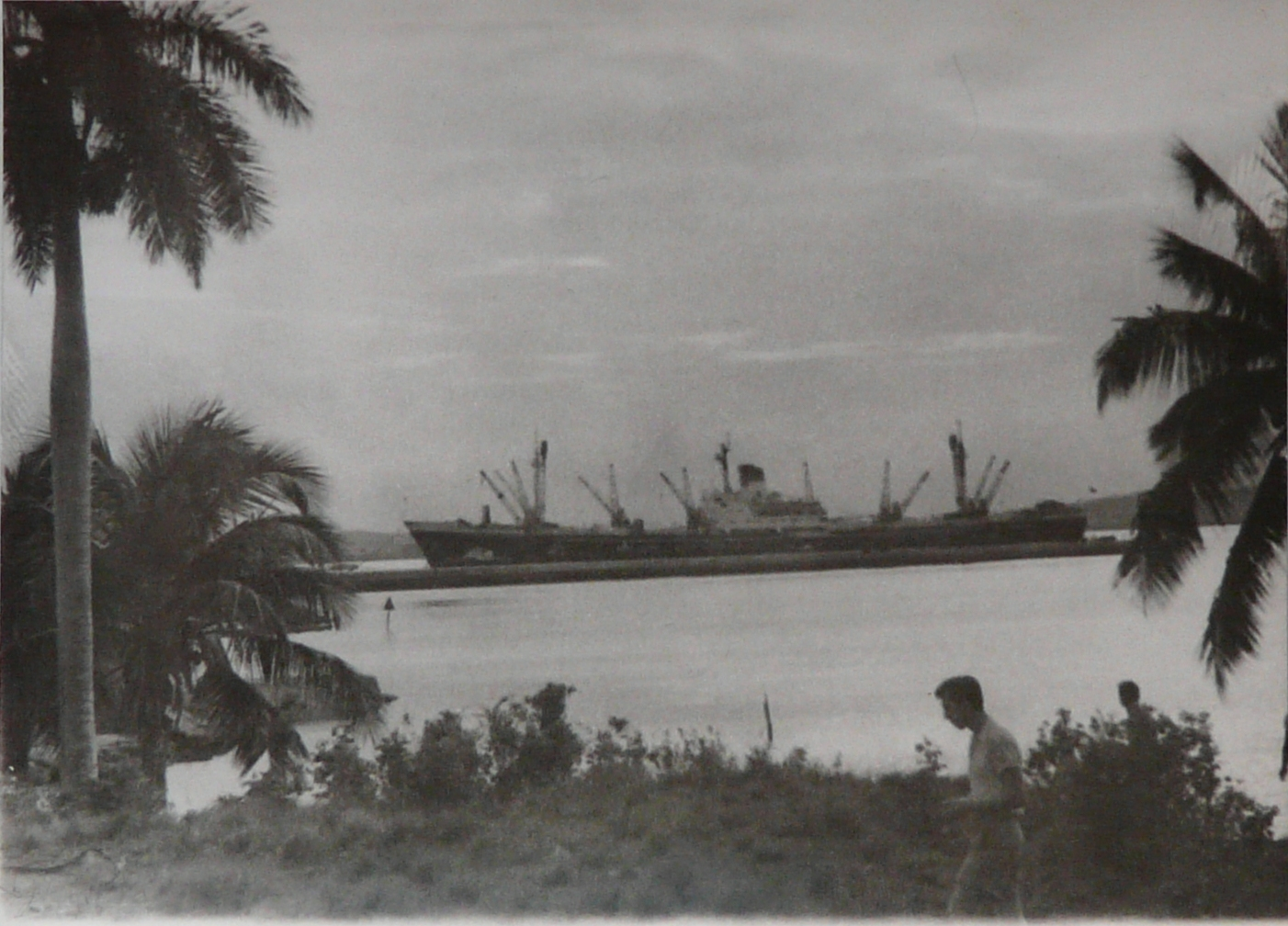
Metallurg Anosov unloading cargo at Cuba

Engines for all ships in the Leninsky Komsomol series were made at the Kirov Plant in Leningrad and installed at the Kherson and Nikolayev shipyards. All, with the exception of the last to be built, Parizhskaya Kommuna, were equipped with a "ТС-1" steam turbine turbo gear unit consisting of a double-case turbine and gears fed by two fuel oil boilers with capacity of 25 tons of steam per hour at a pressure of 42 atmospheres and a temperature of 470 °C. Turbine power was 13 000 hp, giving 1000 rpm at full speed. The gearbox lowered this to 100 rpm in the transition to a single four-bladed bronze propeller with a diameter of 6.3 m. The processes managing the boilers and turbine were automated. The Parizhskaya Communa, completed in 1968, was equipped with a "ГТУ-20" gas turbine from the Kirov Plant.This provided 13,000 hp and allowed Parizhskaya Communa to reach a speed of 19 knots. At that time she was the largest merchant freighter with gas turbine engine in the world. Generally the power output for ships of the class was between 13000 and 14300 hp. Leninsky Komsomol attained a speed of 18.2 knots. The maximum speed of other ships in the class while carrying cargo was 19.2 knots, rising to 20.4 knots when sailing in ballast. This made the Leninsky Komsomol ships faster than most contemporary merchant ships. They had a cruising range of some 12,000 miles.

There were frequent turbine breakdowns while sailing at high speed. If one turbine blade was damaged while at full speed the ship lurched with such force that people on the deck fell and people working at height risked falling and being injured. The heightened fuel consumption at high speed in the face of rising fuel prices made the operation of the ship too expensive. Careful attention was paid to the different speed gradations used in service:

- Maximum speed – the speed recorded on tests after delivery into service, which a ship could reach in case of emergency (such as escaping pursuit; or arriving at a destination port on schedule);
- Operational speed – the speed at which the ship's engines did not receive damage;
- Economic speed – speed that is profitable from an economic point of view and taking into account the prevention of damage to the engine room.

=== Cargo operations ===
The Leninsky Komsomol-class ships had six cargo holds, providing a total bale capacity of 19,925m³ and a bulk capacity of 23,355m³.

Four of the class, including the Metallurg Anosov, were specially equipped for the transportation of troops and weapons, including long-range missiles. The Metallurg Anosov's length overall was 9.1 m longer than the Leninsky Komsomol, the first ship in the class. The beam, moulded depth and size of cargo hatches were also increased.

The Leninsky Komsomol-class ships were equipped with either cargo derricks, used on the first four ships built, or cargo cranes, used on every Leninsky Komsomol-class ship built from 1961 onwards.

The first configuration used was for a ship equipped with cargo booms (cargo derricks) and two heavy-lift derricks:

- 16 cargo derricks lifting 5.0 metric tons. Holds No.1 and No.6 were serviced by two derricks each, the other holds by four derricks each. Holds number 3 and 4 had two derricks lifting 5 metric tons and two derricks lifting 10 metric tons . The other four cargo derricks lifted 10.0 metric tons each.
- The automated derricks were equipped with winches and managed by one person, which could work with two combined derricks.
- Two heavy lift derricks capable of lifting 60.0 metric tons each. These derricks were operated by two people, with two control columns installed on the mast of each derrick.
- Five masts: four of them in an inverted v-shaped construction to carry cargo derricks lifting 5 metric tons each, and an additional one on the accommodation superstructure in the center of the vessel.
- Two pairs of cargo gear columns carrying cargo derricks lifting 10 metric tons.

The second configuration was for cargo cranes and two heavy-lift derricks:

- Twelve electric cargo cranes of type "КЭ-26" with a carrying capacity of 5.0 metric tons, two cranes serving each hold.
- Two heavy derricks with a capacity of 60.0 tons each.
- Three masts: one on the accommodation superstructure in the center of the vessel and two carrying two heavy-lift derricks.

=== Self-defense ===
In the event of military mobilization Leninsky Komsomol-class ships could be fitted with anti-aircraft guns installed on rotary mounts in place of the cargo cranes. The comparatively high speed that the ships could attain would have allowed them to outrun some pursuers, or to escape dangerous areas quickly.

=== Crew ===
The first vessels had berths for 51 people, including 10 spare beds, though the last vessels to be introduced had berths for 48 persons or fewer. The Soviet shipping companies began reducing the crews of merchant ships in the late 1960s, a process which continued into the 1990s. During the last years of their operation, the Leninsky Komsomol-class ships were crewed by around 35 people, nearly half that had originally been necessary. Cabins were initially for single, double or four-person occupancy, and by the 1970s the four-berth cabins had been converted into double berths. The ships were fitted with Soviet-made air-conditioning.

== List of ships ==
Ship	Builder	Official No.	Registry No.	Call Sign	IMO number	Laid down	Launched	Delivered^{[a]}	Fate	Notes
Leninsky Komsomol (Russian: Ленинский Комсомол)	Kherson Shipyard	1201	М-22384	UQIM	5206166	25 September 1957	11 April 1959	23 December 1959	Scrapped in 1988	Renamed Ungur (Унгур) on 31 January 1986
Metallurg Baykov (Russian: Металлург Байков)	Kherson Shipyard	1202	М-22511	UWQU	5233468	25 March 1958		24 July 1960	Scrapped in 1985	Scrapped in Valencia
Metallurg Kurako (Russian: Металлург Курако)	Kherson Shipyard	1203	М-22528	UERM	5233482	18 February 1959		2 November 1961	Scrapping began on 15 November 1986	Sold to Furusawa Kozei Co. Ltd. in 1986. Scrapped at Etajima, Japan in 1986.
Yuriy Gagarin (Russian: Юрий Гагарин)	Kherson Shipyard	1204	М-22552	URDO	5397111	20 December 1959	22 April 1961	30 June 1961	Scrapping began on 2 July 1986	Sold to Zuru Maritime Co. Lt., Cayman Islands and renamed Yuriy (Юрий) in 1986. Scrapped by Sing Cheng Yung Iron & Steel Co. at Kaohsiung, Taiwan in 1986.
Metallurg Bardin (Russian: Металлург Бардин)	Kherson Shipyard	1205		URDP	5233470			17 October 1961	Scrapped in 1986	Renamed Bardin (Бардин) on 6 June 1986 (U.K. flag). Scrapped at Kaohsiung in 1986.
Khirurg Vishnevsky (Russian: Хирург Вишневский)	Kherson Shipyard	1206		UYOK	5186366			28 December 1961	Scrapped in June 1986	Renamed Khirurg (Хирург) in 1986 (unknown flag) and scrapped in Kaohsiung in June 1986.
Khimik Zelinsky (Russian: Химик Зелинский)	Kherson Shipyard	1207	М-27523	UYOL	5186330	30 January 1961		8 April 1962	Scrapping began on 6 June 1994	Trapped by the maritime blockade during the Iran–Iraq War. Damaged by rocket off Basra on 19 September 1980. Crew sent home and local watchmen hired to guard the ship. Finally decommissioned and abandoned. Renamed Dolphin VI and scrapped at Gadani Beach, Pakistan, in 1994.
Fizik Kurchatov (Russian: Физик Курчатов)	Kherson Shipyard	1208	М-27551	UYOM	5404093	20 March 1961		June 1962	Scrapped in August 1986	Renamed Kurchat, home flag Gorgetown (Cayman Islands) on 30 April 1986, scrapped at Kaohsiung (Taiwan) in August 1986.
Metallurg Anosov (Russian: Металлург Аносов)	Kherson Shipyard	1209	М-27552	USMW	5233456			29 September 1962	Scrapped in 1986	Renamed Anosov and homeported in George Town, Cayman Islands on 21 March 1986. Decommissioned in May 1986. Scrapped at Qinhuangdao in 1986.
Krasnay Presnya (Russian: Красная Пресня)	Kherson Shipyard	1210		UKJA	5196426			16 December 1962	Scrapped in 1986	Renamed Krasnaya (unknown flag) in 1986. Scrapped at Kaohsiung in 1986.
Transbalt (Russian: Трансбалт)	Kherson Shipyard	1211		UKER	5367283			29 December 1962	Scrapped in 1986	Renamed Orion (unknown flag) in 1986. Scrapped at Kaohsiung in 1986.
Krasnyi Oktyabr (Russian: Красный Октябрь)	Kherson Shipyard	1212		ULZB	5406338			23 May 1963	Scrapped in 1986	Renamed Krasnyy (unknown flag) in 1986. Scrapped at Kaohsiung in 1986.
Valentina Tereshkova (Russian: Валентина Терешкова)	Kherson Shipyard	1213		ULZD	5425736			30 June 1963	Scrapped in 1989	Renamed Valentina (unknown flag) in 1988. Scrapped in China in 1989.
Ravenstvo (Russian: Равенство)	Kherson Shipyard	1214		UDWH	6401517			30 June 1963	Scrapped c. 1991	Sold for scrapping in 1991
Bratstvo (Russian: Братство)	Kherson Shipyard	1215	М-27595	UDXO	6405044	20 September 1962		29 December 1963	Scrapped in 1985	Damaged in a collision with the Soviet submarine K-53 in the Gibraltar Straits in September 1984. Towed to Algeciras, decommissioned in March 1985 and scrapped in Algeciras in 1985.
Svoboda (Russian: Свобода)	Kherson Shipyard	1216		UEAM	6412528			12 March 1964	Scrapped in July 1989	Attacked by pirates in the Malacca Strait 50 miles from Singapore on 15 January 1987. Pirates boarded at night but the crew neutralized them. Scrapped at Chittagong in July 1989.
Akademik Shimansky (Russian: Академик Шиманский)	Kherson Shipyard	1217		UYBV	6419485			27 June 1964		Transferred to the Soviet Navy's Pacific Fleet and renamed Самара (Samara) in 1986. Subsequent fate unknown.
Kreml (Russian: Кремль)	Kherson Shipyard	1218		UYBW	6511154			28 September 1964	Scrapped in 1986	Renamed Krem (unknown flag) in 1986 and scrapped at Kaohsiung in 1986.
Parizhskaya Kommuna (Russian: Парижская Коммуна)	Kherson Shipyard	1219		UTKX	6612001	25 June 1964	December 1965	17 December 1968	Scrapped in 1992	Renamed Pariz (unknown flag) in 1991 and scrapped at Aliağa, Turkey in 1992.
Yunyi Leninets (Russian: Юный Ленинец)	Kherson Shipyard	1220		UYCG	6511116			30 December 1964	Scrapped in 1990	Scrapped in Chittagong in 1990.
Fizik Vavilov (Russian: Физик Вавилов)	Nikolayev Shipyard	804	М-22509	UYYU	5115769			1960	Scrapped in November 1984	Scrapped in Huangpu River in November 1984.
Fizik Lebedev (Russian: Физик Лебедев)	Nikolayev Shipyard	805	М-22526	UYYV	5115757			1960	Scrapped in 1991	Renamed Aragvi (unknown flag) in January 1986 and sold for scrap. Departed on last voyage on 26 January 1986. Scrapped in Qian-Jin, China in 1991.
Frederik Jolio-Kyuri (Russian: Фредерик Жолио-Кюри)	Nikolayev Shipyard	806	М-22554	UQDP	5120714			1961	Scrapped in 1989	Renamed Fred and homeported in Basra, Iraq in 1988. Scrapped at Alang, India in May 1989.
Leninsky Pioner (Russian: Ленинский Пионер)	Nikolayev Shipyard	807	М-27565	ULZW	5206178			1962	Scrapped in 1987	Transferred to the Soviet Navy in 1986 for use as a large sea-going dry cargo transport and the same year renamed Колхида. Sold for scrap in 1987, name removed from Lloyd's List in 1999.^{[b]}
Krasnoe Znamya (Russian: Красное Знамя)	Nikolayev Shipyard	808	М-27588	ULZX	6401476			1963	Scrapped in 1986	Renamed Krasnое in 1986, homeported in George Town, Cayman Islands. Scrapped at Kaohsiung in April 1986.

== Ship specifications ==
Ship	Displacement	DWT	Gross tonnage	GRT	Gear	Length	Beam	Moulded depth	Draught (laden)	Speed
Leninsky Komsomol	22,200 t (21,849 long tons; 24,471 short tons)	15,980 t (15,728 long tons; 17,615 short tons)	11,094 t (10,919 long tons; 12,229 short tons)		Derricks	169.9 m (557 ft)	21.8 m (72 ft)	12.9 m (42 ft)	9.73 m (32 ft)	18.2 kn (34 km/h; 21 mph) (laden)
Metallurg Baykov		16,020 t (15,767 long tons; 17,659 short tons)	11,094 t (10,919 long tons; 12,229 short tons)		Derricks					
Metallurg Kurako		16,003 t (15,750 long tons; 17,640 short tons)	11,243 t (11,065 long tons; 12,393 short tons)	12,285	Cranes	169.9 m (557 ft)	21.8 m (72 ft)	12.9 m (42 ft)	9.7 m (32 ft)	19 kn (35 km/h; 22 mph)
Yuriy Gagarin		16,195 t (15,939 long tons; 17,852 short tons)		12,285	Cranes					
Metallurg Bardin		16,249 t (15,992 long tons; 17,911 short tons)	11,206 t (11,029 long tons; 12,353 short tons)		Cranes					
Khirurg Vishnevsky					Cranes					
Khimik Zelinsky					Cranes					
Fizik Kurchatov	22,225 t (21,874 long tons; 24,499 short tons)	16,247 t (15,990 long tons; 17,909 short tons)			Cranes	170 m (558 ft)	22 m (72 ft)			18.5 kn (34 km/h; 21 mph)
Metallurg Anosov		16,251 t (15,994 long tons; 17,914 short tons)			Cranes	179 m (587 ft)	22.6 m (74 ft)	16 m (52 ft)		
Krasnay Presnya					Cranes					
Transbalt					Cranes					
Krasnyi Oktyabr					Cranes					
Valentina Tereshkova					Cranes					
Ravenstvo		16,255 t (15,998 long tons; 17,918 short tons)	11,206 t (11,029 long tons; 12,353 short tons)		Cranes					
Bratstvo		16,230 t (15,974 long tons; 17,891 short tons)	11,509 t (11,327 long tons; 12,687 short tons)		Cranes					
Svoboda					Cranes					
Akademik Shimansky					Cranes					
Kreml					Cranes					
Parizhskaya Kommuna					Cranes					
Yunyi Leninets					Cranes					
Fizik Vavilov		16,032 t (15,779 long tons; 17,672 short tons)	11,094 t (10,919 long tons; 12,229 short tons)		Derricks					
Fizik Lebedev					Derricks					
Frederik Jolio-Kyuri		16,215 t (15,959 long tons; 17,874 short tons)			Cranes					
Leninsky Pioner					Cranes					
Krasnoe Znamya					Cranes					

== Significance ==
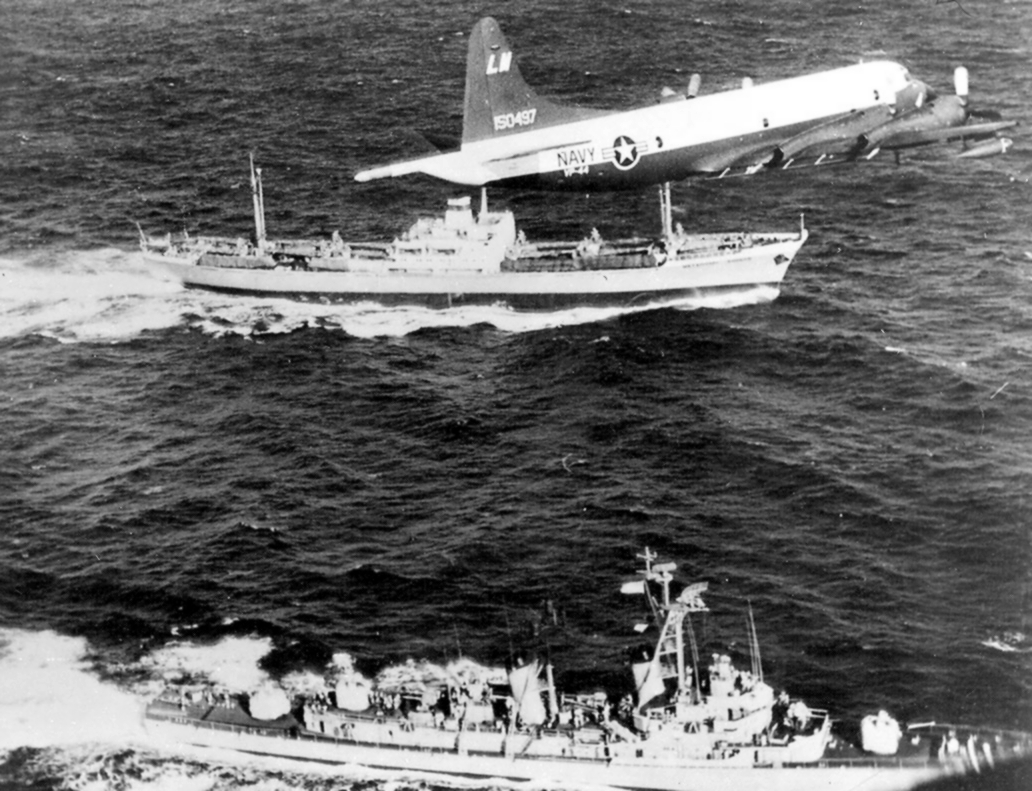
A U.S. Navy Lockheed P-3A-20-LO Orion (BuNo 150497) of Patrol Squadron VP-44 flies over the Metallurg Anosov and destroyer USS Barry during the Cuban Missile Crisis. Photo taken 10 November 1962.

Michael Yakovich Kozubenko (Russian: Козубенко Михаил Якович), a cinematographer working at Odessa Film Studio from 1953 produced the 1959 documentary film "Leninsky Komsomol class turbo-runners". The class were held up as examples of the latest in Soviet shipping construction, and used in promotional advertisements in 1963/1964 for the USSR Maritime Transport, depicting the Leninsky Komsomol-class ships built in the shipyards of the Ukrainian SSR, and the tanker Sofia, which had been built in a Leningrad shipyard. The Leninsky Komsomol-class ships also received wide coverage in newspaper and magazine articles. The class was a particularly significant milestone in the shipbuilding history of U.S.S.R., and Kherson Shipyard in particular. They were somewhat less so for Nikolayev Shipyard, as only five were built there, and the yard was already well known for the construction of naval vessels.

In 2009 the Marshall Islands issued a series of stamps dedicated to the Cuban Missile Crisis. One depicted a Leninsky Komsomol-class ship, described as the Metallurg Kurako, surrounded by warships and patrol aircraft of the US Navy. The depiction is similar to a photograph of the Metallurg Anosov, and it may be that it is the Metallurg Anosov pictured on this stamp.

== Notes ==
a. All ships were handed over to the Black Sea Shipping Company on the date of their completion, with the exception of Parishskaya Kommuna, which was delivered to the company after an extended period of sea trials.

b. The dates of the scrapping of Leninsky Pioner and her removal from Lloyd's Register are different. Leninsky Pioner was transferred from Black Sea Shipping Company to the Soviet Navy's Black Sea Fleet in 1986. A new container ship also named Leninsky Pioner was laid down on 23 January 1987. It is not clear which vessel was removed from Lloyd's List in 1999.
