= Cuba crisis =

Cuba crisis and Cuban crisis may refer to:

- The 1962 Cuban Missile Crisis
- The 1994 Cuban rafter crisis
- The 2021–2023 Cuban migration crisis
- The 2026 United States fuel blockade on Cuba

== See also ==
- United States embargo against Cuba (1960-)
- 2024–2026 Cuba blackouts
