= Ship measurements =

Term or definition relating to measuring a ship's characteristics

Ship measurements consist of a multitude of terms and definitions specifically related to ships and measuring or defining their characteristics.

== Definitions ==
Beam – A measure of the width of the ship. There are two types
Beam, Overall (BOA), commonly referred to simply as Beam – The overall width of the ship measured at the widest point of the nominal waterline.
Beam on Centerline (BOC) – Used for multihull vessels. The BOC for vessels is measured as follows: For a catamaran: the perpendicular distance from the centerline of one hull to the centerline of the other hull, measured at deck level. For a trimaran: the perpendicular distance between the centerline of the main hull and the centerline of either ama, measured at deck level. This term is typically used in conjunction with LOA (Length overall; see below). The ratio of LOA/BOC is used to estimate the stability of multihull vessels. The lower the ratio, the greater the vessel's stability.
Carlin
Similar to beam, except running in a fore and aft direction.
Complement
The full number of people required to operate a ship. Includes officers and crew; does not include passengers. The number of people assigned to a warship in peacetime may be considerably less than her full complement.
Cube
The cargo carrying capacity of a ship, measured in cubic metres or feet. There are two common types:
Bale Cube (or Bale Capacity) – The space available for cargo measured in cubic metres or feet to the inside of the cargo battens, on the frames, and to the underside of the beams. It is a measurement of capacity for cargo in bales or pallets, etc, where the cargo does not conform to the shape of the ship.
Grain Cube (or Grain Capacity) – The maximum space available for cargo measured in cubic metres or feet, the measurement being taken to the inside of the shell plating of the ship or to the outside of the frames and to the top of the beam or underside of the deck plating. It is a measurement of capacity for cargoes such as grain, where the cargo flows to conform to the shape of the ship.
Displacement
A measurement of the weight or mass of the vessel, at a given draught.
(Merchant ships display gross tonnage; see tonnage), deadweight and the number of items it can carry i.e. TEU 20 ft equivalent units. Displacement is expressed in tonnes (metric unit). Displacement of a ship built for the US is in long tons, Warships are shown in displacement tons or tonnes. To preserve secrecy, nations sometimes misstate a warship's displacement.
Lightweight displacement – LWD – The weight or mass of the ship excluding cargo, fuel, ballast, stores, passengers, and crew, but with water in the boilers to steaming level.
Loadline displacement – The weight or mass of the ship loaded to the load line or plimsoll mark.
Deadweight tonnage (DWT) is a measure of how much weight a ship can carry. It is the sum of the weights of cargo, fuel, fresh water, ballast water, provisions, passengers, and crew.
Draft or draught (d) or (T)
The vertical distance from the bottom of the keel to the waterline. Used mainly to determine the minimum water depth for safe passage of a vessel and to calculate the vessel's displacement (obtained from ship's stability tables) so as to determine the mass of cargo on board.
Draft, Air
Air Draft/Draught is the distance from the water line to the highest point on a ship (including antennas) while it is loaded. Air draft is the minimum height a ship needs to pass under, while standard draft is the minimum depth a ship needs to float over.
Length between perpendiculars
The distance between where the forward part cuts the waterline and the rudder post of the ship.
Length Overall (LOA) – The maximum length of the ship between the ship's extreme points; important for berthing purposes.
Length at Waterline (LWL) – The ship's length measured at the waterline.
Length of gun deck (LGD)
Length of Keel (LK)
Shaft Horsepower (SHP)
The amount of mechanical power delivered by the engine to a propeller shaft. One horsepower is equivalent to 746 watts.
Tonnage
A number derived from any of several methods to calculate the volume or other number indicative of a ship's cargo carrying capacity.
Gross tonnage – GT – Not expressible in units of mass or weight but is based on the total volume of the vessel in cubic meters with a formula applied. GT replaced Gross register tonnage (GRT), which is now an obsolete unit.
Net tonnage – NT – Not expressible in units of mass or weight but is based on the cargo volume of the vessel in cubic meter with a formula applied. NT replaced Net register tonnage (NRT) which is now an obsolete unit.

== See also ==
- Metrics
- Ship size categories
- List of Panamax ports
