= SS Metallurg Anosov =

Merchant ship of Black Sea Shipping Company

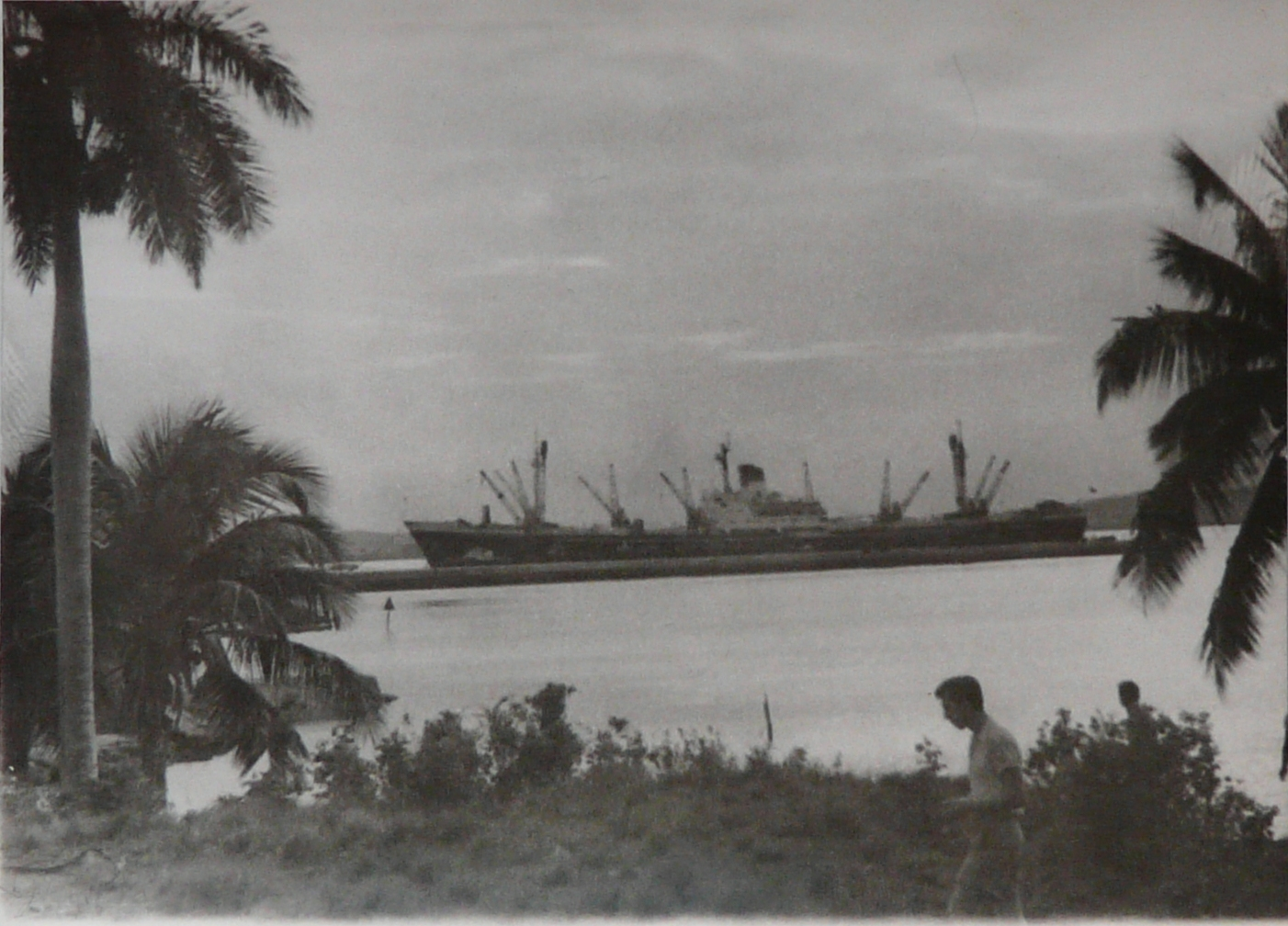
- SS Metallurg Anosov during a cargo operation in Cuba, during the 1960s

History
- Name: Metallurg Anosov; (Russian: Металлург Аносов)
- Namesake: Anosov Pavel Petrovich
- Owner: 1962–1986: Black Sea Shipping Company, (Soviet Union) USSR
- Operator: 1962–1986: Black Sea Shipping Company, (Soviet Union) USSR
- Port of registry: Sept 1962 – 21 March 1986: Odessa, (Soviet Union) USSR; 21 March 1986 - May 1986: George Town, Cayman Islands
- Route: 30 Sept – 02 Nov 1962: Odessa-Nikolayev–Mariel, Cuba; 03 Nov - end of Nov 1962: Mariel, Cuba - USSR; Dec 1962 - Sept 1963: Voyages from U.S.S.R. to Cuba; Aug - Dec 1964: First circumnavigation
- Builder: (Soviet Union) Kherson shipyard
- Launched: July, 1962
- Completed: 29 September 1962
- Maiden voyage: Odessa-Nikolayev–Mariel, Cuba from 30 of September to 2 of November 1962
- Renamed: Anosov in 1988
- Identification: Call sign: USMW; IMO number: 5233456
- Fate: Scrapped in May, 1986

General characteristics
- Type: freighter, tweendecker
- Tonnage: 12,285 GT; 16216 winter DW; 16251 summer DW
- Length: 587.3 ft (179.0 m)
- Beam: 74 ft (22.6 m)
- Height: 52.5 ft (16.0 m)
- Propulsion: two steam turbine engines driving a single 6.3 m (21 ft) screw propeller
- Speed: 20 knots in ballast condition, 24 knots in cargo condition.
- Capacity: bale: 20220 cub.m.; grain: 23763 cub.m.

The SS Metallurg Anosov (Russian: Металлург Аносов) was a merchant ship of Black Sea Shipping Company (Soviet Union). the ship was one of the project 567K Leninsky Komsomol class, a multi-purpose tweendecker freighter with steam turbine engines. The ship takes its name from scientist and metallurgist Pavel Anosov.

== Specifications ==
=== Modifications ===
The SS Metallurg Anosov was one of the four Leninsky Komsomol-class cargo ships specially equipped for troop and weapon transportation. The overall length of these transports was increased by 9.1 metres (30 ft), along with size increases to the cargo hold widths, depths and bay doors. These modifications allowed the class to be used as a missile carrier.

=== Engines ===
The main engines were made at the Kirov Plant (Leningrad, USSR), and were installed in the Kherson shipyard. The engines produced 13000/14300 horsepower at 1000 rpm, allowing the ship to achieve a ballasted speed of 20 kn (37 km/h; 23 mph). The ship was equipped with a steam turbine turbo gear unit, the "TS-1" consisting of double-case turbine and gear fed by two fuel oil boilers, with a steam capacity of 25 tons per hour, at pressure of 42 atmospheres and temperature of 470 °C. The gearbox lowered the output rpm to 100, and fed the power to the main propeller, a single four-bladed bronze propeller with a diameter of 6.3 metres (21 ft) in an automated process.

=== Self-defence ===
In the event of mobilisation, the ship could mount several anti-aircraft guns on the rotary turrets where the cargo cranes were mounted.

== Record of service ==
After the completion of construction in Kherson shipyard, the ship passed sea trials for three days in September 1962. The ship was commissioned by Black Sea Shipping Company on 29 September 1962. At the time, the turbine-runner Metallurg Anosov was the fastest merchant vessel in the Soviet Union. The ship's dimensions: length overall 179 m, width – 22.6 m, moulded depth – 16 m, speed – 20 knots (37 km/h; 23 mph).

After the signing of the act of acceptance, the ship was moved to Odessa. Hold number 4 was converted for troop transportation by the dock workers, allowing for up to 1,600 soldiers to be bunked aboard. The vessel also took on fuel, food, fresh water, and other marine supplies before moving to Nikolayev for the loading of its main cargo, a set of missiles.

=== Maiden voyage ===
The maiden voyage of Metallurg Anosov occurred during the Cuban blockade, the most stressful period of the Cuban Missile Crisis.

The ship was initially loaded in Nikolayev port with missiles of an unknown type and also a special containers for rocket fuel were latched onto the main deck.

A large number of troops from the 51st Missile Division, 664th Missile Regiment, including the regiment headquarters, combat support, and service subdivisions were housed in hold number 4 on 3 October 1962. At the time, only the commanding officer knew that the destination was Cuba. Before deploying, General Degtyarev, who was in charge of the Defence Ministry at the time, held a briefing. The general then handed a secret package, marked "To be opened four days after the passage of the Strait of Gibraltar" to the master of the ship Babienko. Later that day, at 02:00 on the 4th of October 1962, the ship unmoored and began its maiden voyage to the Strait of Gibraltar.

Turkish warships met the ship close to the Bosphorus. After quarantine formalities, the warships accompanied the SS Metallurg Anosov through the Bosphorus, the Marmara Sea and Dardanelles to access the Aegean Sea.

During transit through the Bosphorus, a barge without any illumination or signal lights appeared beside the Metallurg Anosov at night. The ship took evasive action, avoiding a collision with the barge by 10 metres (33 ft). Russian officials theorized that the Turks would have used a collision as pretext to storm the vessel, exposing the secret shipment.

A man aboard a similar ship taking the same route, the Divnogorsk, recounted the voyage:

... the bunk beds were equipped for the personnel. They were allowed to let out on the open deck at night only and not more than four persons on the open deck... We were escorted by NATO ships, planes and helicopters ... Once day the captain of ship together with the commander of echelon climb down into the hold to us and said that NATO troops tried to stop the previous ship, it is why we need to be ready for anything. He said: "You are like the agricultural specialists and carrying farm machinery, but do not forget who you are." Then orders were given to petty officers to hand tommy-guns with a clear mission to prevent entering the hold for everybody. The tommy-guns were stored under the bed mattress ...

Combined with the difficulties of transporting a large number of people on a vessel not designed for such, several difficulties were encountered with the ship's cargo. Primarily, the refueling tracks, tanks, and containers produced toxic fumes, and the containers themselves were volatile at high temperatures. The fuel could become toxic to people in the surrounding area, and there was a risk of explosion during the hot weather. Over these fuel tanks and containers, seawater was poured almost 24 hours per day to avoid an explosion from overheating. Living conditions of the people who accompanied the cargo were difficult. They breathed toxic substances, were irradiated, and accordingly became sick.

The rocket fuel "heptyl" was carried in special containers which were not present in the holds of the most common commercial vessels.

Four days after passing through the Gibraltar Strait the captain opened the secret package in the presence of the pompolit and the commander, Colonel Sergei Verenik. The package contained only a single line: "Turbine-runner 'Metallurg Anosov' has to sail to the Cuban port Cabañas." After it was read, the orders were burned.

Soldiers and officers came out at night only to breathe the ocean air, and to be away from the fumes below. Lessons on Cuban culture were taught during the voyage.

As the ship approached Cuba, it had several encounters with NATO forces. U.S. submarines were spotted floating in front of the ship, in an attempt to provoke a collision, or to send the ship off course. Additionally, several U.S. Navy airplanes repeatedly flew close over the ship, sometimes coming close to crashing into the ship's superstructure.

On 22 October, Metallurg Anosov arrived at the port of Cabañas. The first rank captain and two colonels met the ship at the pier. There the ship received a new order: to proceed to Mariel Bay and receive a new order from the Soviet ambassador to Cuba, Alexander Alexeyev. One general and several colonels of General Staff met the ship at the specified bay.

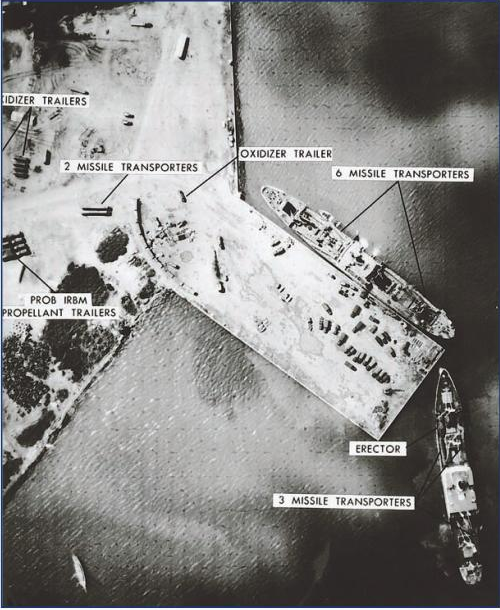
A Department of Defense photo shows Soviet missiles being loaded on the ship Metallurg Anosov at port in Mariel port

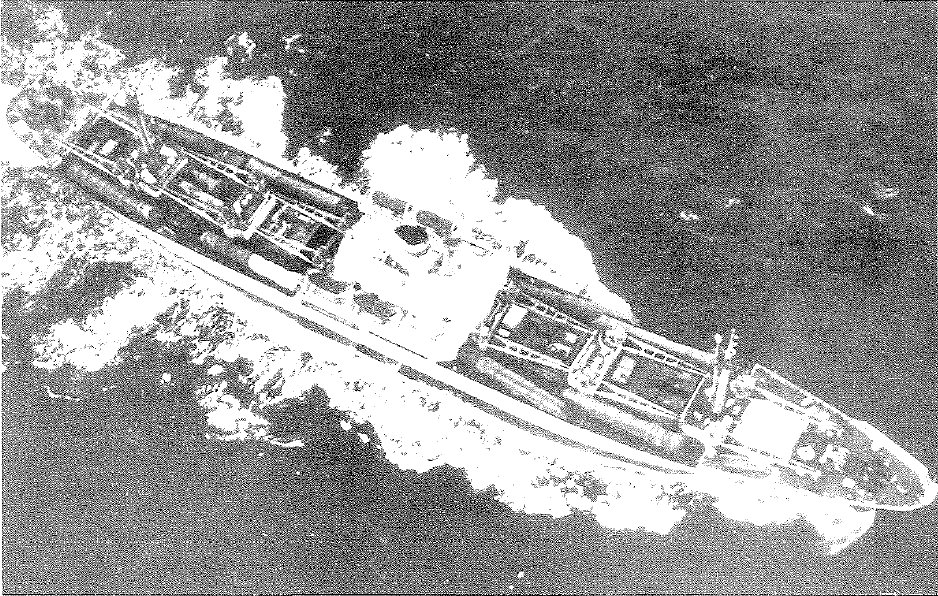
The Metallurg Anosov, carrying eight missile transporters with canvas-covered missiles

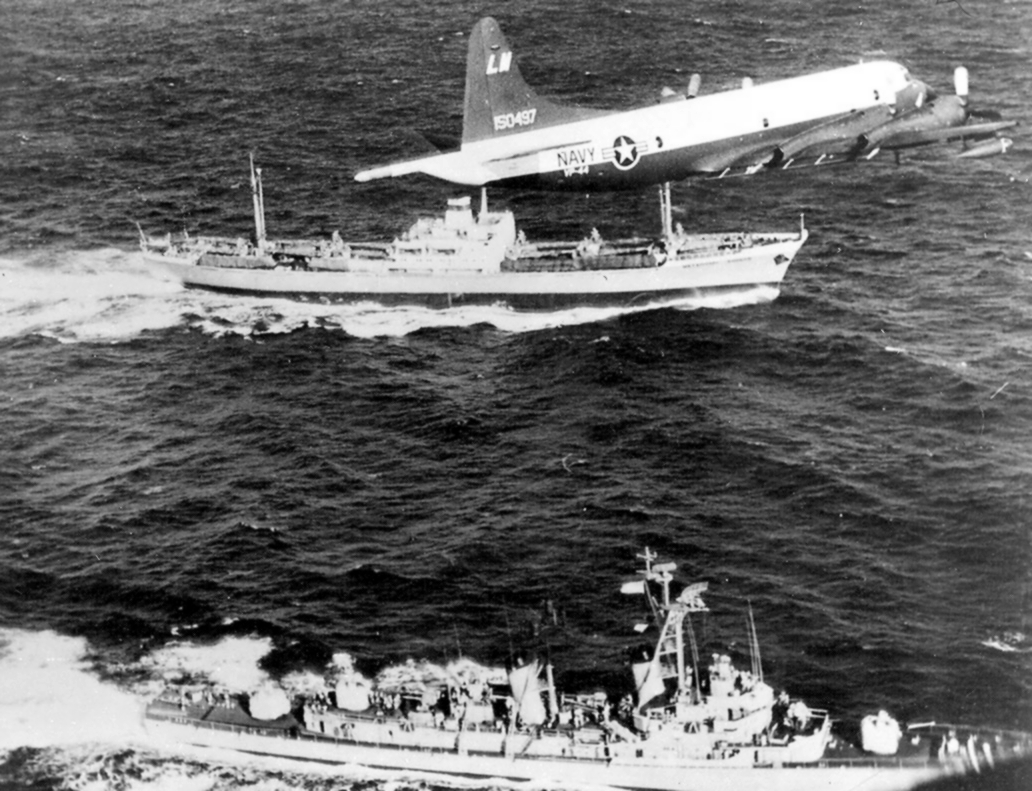
A U.S. Navy Lockheed P-3A-20-LO Orion (BuNo 150497) of Patrol Squadron VP-44 flies over the Metallurg Anosov and destroyer USS Barry (DD-933) during the Cuban Missile Crisis.

On 25 October, the Soviet government issued a statement of protest following the United States' blockade of Cuba as an illegal action under maritime law. Captains of Soviet vessels received an order to not obey commands from US ships forbidding them from entering Cuban waters.

On 29 October 1962 the USSR decided to take the missiles and other offensive weapons out of Cuba. Nine vessels, including the Metallurg Anosov, were allocated to the task.

The ship was quickly unloaded, and as soon as the last cargo was ashore, the captain of the ship Babienko, received an order for the ship to return to Soviet Union. However, right before ship's departure a general came aboard for inspection. He immediately halted ship's departure. It would later be revealed that the First Vice Chairman of the Council of Ministers of the USSR Mikoyan had flown to Cuba on 2 November 1962, prompting the move.

=== Removing missiles from Cuba ===
The Metallurg Anosov was one of the nine Soviet freighters involved in returning Soviet missiles and their launchers to the USSR from Cuba. The loading of the missiles and their launchers was carried out in Mariel Bay, from 2 November through 7 November 1962. During the loading, NATO aircraft flew over the port and took photos. The Metallurg Anosov sailed from Mariel on 7 November 1962.

USS Barry was ordered to investigate a Soviet merchant ship, and proceeded to her station on 9 November, sighting the merchant ship that evening. The Barry closed to within 400 yards (370 m) of the Metallurg Anosov's starboard quarter, illuminated the ship's quarter and bow, and identified her. Trailing astern, the Barry followed the merchant ship, heading east away from the blockade zone, until morning. After dawn, the destroyer closed on the merchant, in order to "obtain photographs of deck cargo", until late morning when she changed course for the aircraft carrier USS Essex for refueling and to transfer the photographs.

USS Barry and a Patrol Squadron of VP-44 escorted this ship on the 10 of November, 1962. The VP-44 patrol squadron achieved international recognition of sorts when an aircraft photographed the deck while flying close surveillance over the Metallurg Anasov. The Metallurg Anasov was the only Russian vessel refusing to uncover all of the missiles lashed to the deck. The squadron verified that eight large oblong objects, which appeared to be missiles, were located on its deck and the ship was allowed to proceed. The Utica Observer-Dispatch newspaper reported on 11 November 1962:

When the destroyer Barry inspected the freighter Anosov at dawn yesterday the Soviet skipper refused repeated requests to completely uncover missiles lashed to the deck. But there seemed no doubt that they were rockets and the Pentagon said the count was carried out "without incident".

The Metallurg Anosov arrived at its destination port in the Black Sea after 20 November and was likely unloaded before 1 December 1962.

=== From December 1963 to August 1964 ===
After December 1962, the Metallurg Anosov performed voyages to Cuba and Angola under the command of Captain Babienko.

=== First circumnavigation ===
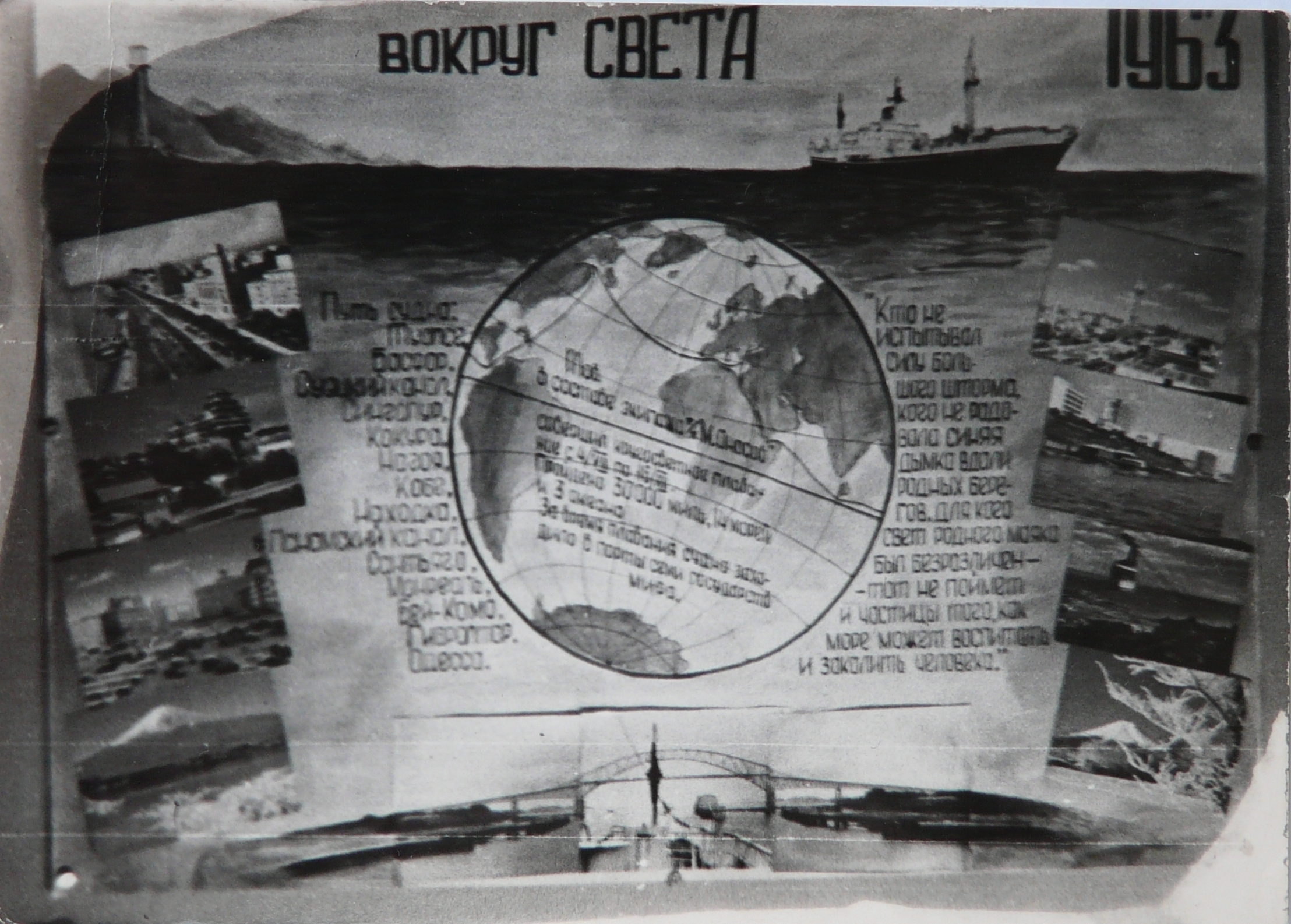
Certificate of circumnavigation «Металлург Аносов»

The first circumnavigation of the world for the Metallurg Anosov occurred from 4 August to 16 December 1963.

Ports of call, main straits and canals during the circumnavigation:

- Tuapse – sailed from port on 4 of August, 1963
- Bosphorus Strait transit
- Suez Canal transit
- Singapore – bunkering
- Kokura, Japan
- Nagoya, Japan
- Kobe, Japan
- Nakhodka, USSR
- Panama Canal transit
- Santiago de Cuba – discharge military cargo and likely loaded with sugar
- Montreal, Quebec, Canada – sugar discharge
- Baie-Comeau, Quebec, Canada – loading with grain
- Gibraltar – bunkering
- Bosphorus Strait transit
- Odessa – arrived 16 of December, 1963

=== Australian voyage ===
Ships of Black Sea Shipping Company rarely made call in Australian. This time the Metallurg Anosov made port in Australia, hence on this voyage the crew called it the "Australian voyage". The captain during this voyage was Nikolay Babienko.

The Metallurg Anosov sailed from the Black Sea through the Bosphorus, Dardanelles, Suez Canal entered the Red Sea and then to the final destination in the Far East.

==== Call to Nakhodka ====
The ship arrived at Nakhodka port in Russia early in 1964 to take in bunker and supply.

==== Call in Japan ====
In March 1964 the ship sailed from Japan, crossed the equator at longitude 154° 00' E on 14 March 1964, before proceeding to their destination port of Sydney, Australia.

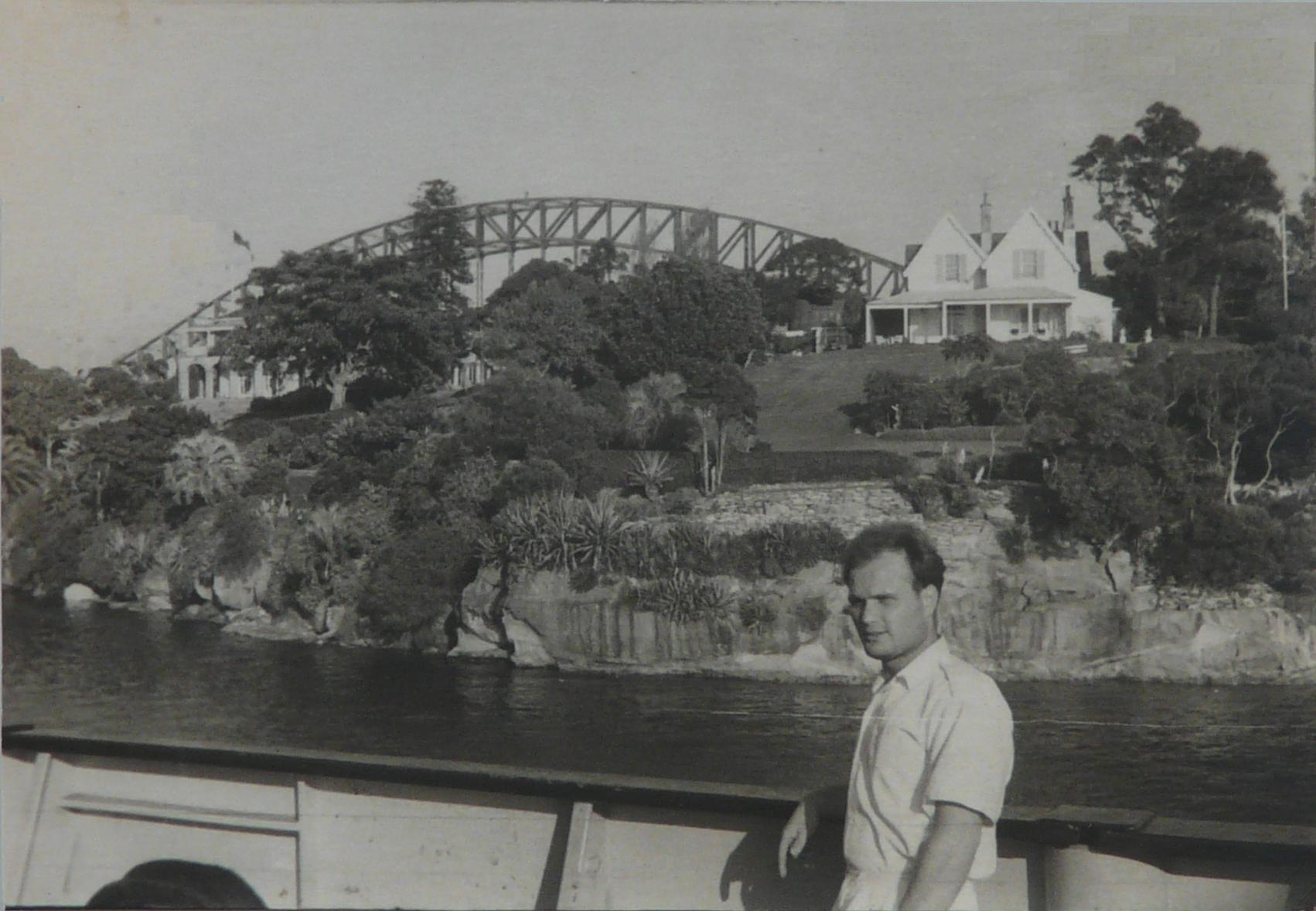
The ship Metallurg Anosov near Sydney Harbour Bridge in 1964.

==== Call in Sydney ====
The Metallurg Anosov proceeded to the berth for mooring in Sydney on 4 April 1964. The cargo for loading was grain. The ship briefly appears in 12th episode of NFSA "Life in Australia" series, "Life in Sydney".

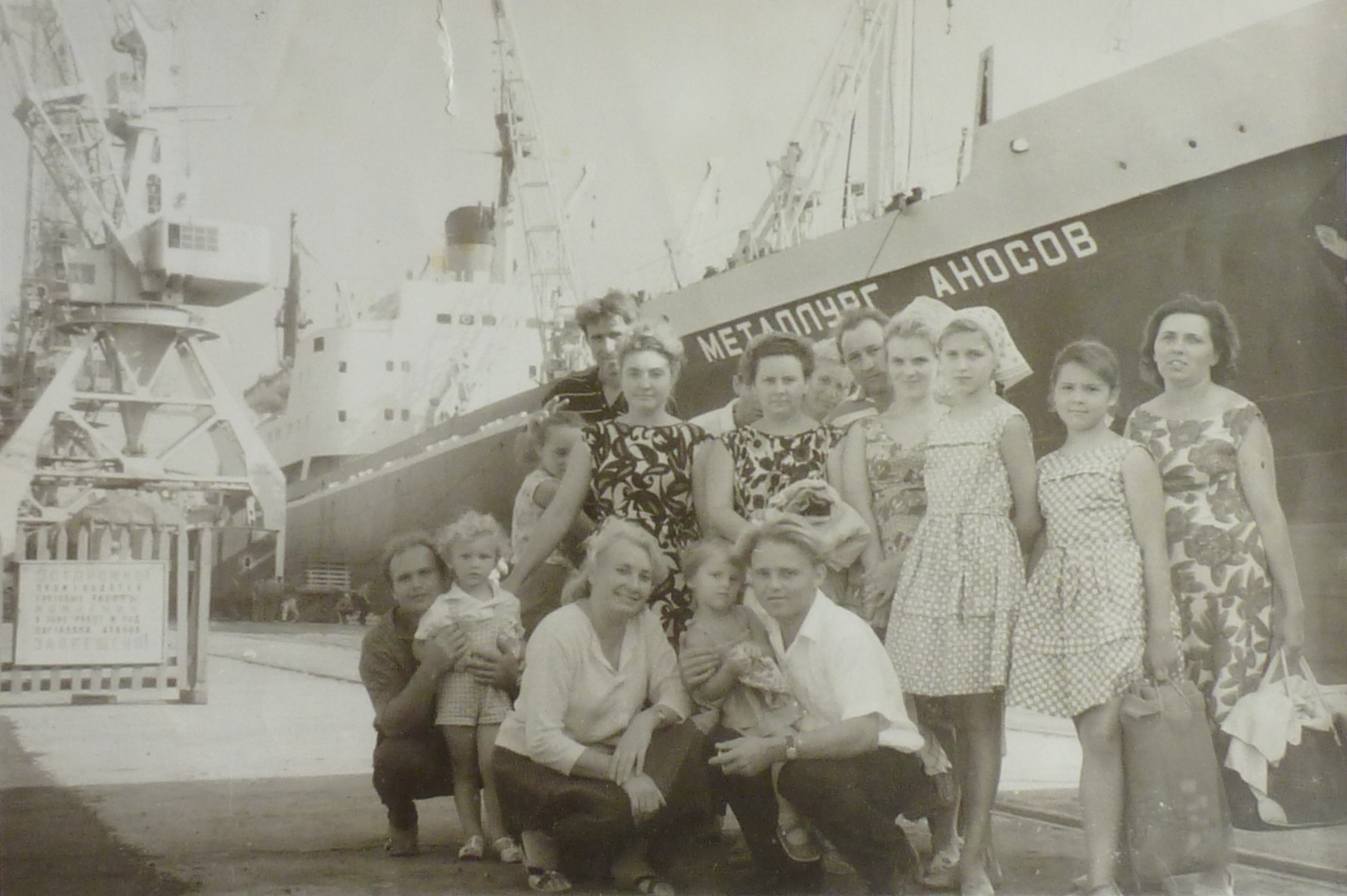
Crew-members of the Metallurg Anosov and their families in a Soviet Black Sea port, after the Australian voyage.

=== Voyage from August 1964 to January 1965 ===
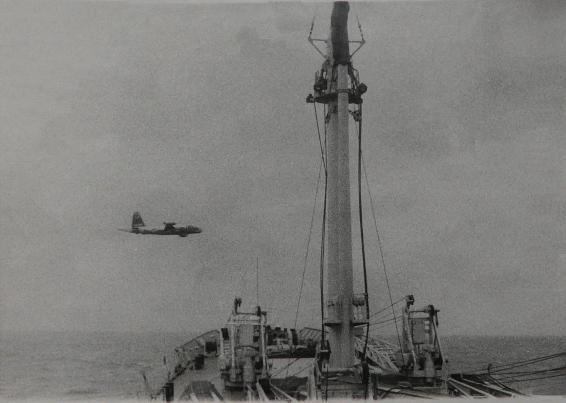
US Navy P-2 Neptune over the bow of the ship Metallurg Anosov close to Cuba in September or November 1964.

The ship sailed from the Black Sea to Japan through the Suez Canal in August 1964. From Japan, the Metallurg Anosov passed to Cuba through the Panama Canal. From Cuba, the ship went back to Japan through the Panama Camal to unload a cargo of sugar in Japan. Then the vessel ran to Singapore to load rubber. After Singapore, the ship returned to the Black Sea and discharged cargo in Illichivsk port in January 1965.

=== Service from 1965 to 1967 ===
For its next voyages, of Metallurg Anosov went between the Black Sea and Cuba.

The ship also visited Alexandria and Algeria between 1965 and 1967.

During its voyages to Algeria, the ship carried military cargo.

=== Around Africa from 1967 to 1969 ===
During the Six-Day War in June 1967 Israel occupied the Sinai Peninsula, and as such the Suez Canal was closed for shipping between 1967 and 1975.

Therefore, the Metallurg Anosov was forced to go around Cape Horn from 1967 to 1975, visiting South African ports for bunkering for voyages from the Black Sea to Asian ports in the Indian and Pacific Oceans. During its trip, the ship crossed the equator at longitude 009° 30' W on 24 of July 1967 and the crew received Equator Line Crossing Certificates.

=== Circumnavigation including equatorial crossing (1969-1970) ===
According to another certificate of equatorial crossing, the Metallurg Anosov again circumnavigated the globe when she sailed from Odessa to Cuba. After leaving port in Cuba in late 1969 or early January 1970, the ship passed through the Panama Canal and steamed to Japan. The equator was crossed in the Atlantic Ocean in March 1970. The ship then passed around Africa and received bunker and other ship's supply in a South African port.

=== Around Africa from 1971–1975 ===
The ship was in a Black Sea Soviet port in February 1971, for a change of crew.

The Metallurg Anosov skirted the epicenter of a cyclone with a strength of 8 points on the Beaufort scale, when she came back from Cuba in 1971.

The ship visited Qatar once, sometime between 15 April 1971 and February 1973.

The ship visited Ceylon in the second part of January 1973.

The ship was in Cuba at the end of March and in May 1973. After Cuba the ship was loaded in the United States and proceeded to Beirut for discharge. After Beirut the ship went back to the USSR.

During the next voyage from the USSR, the ship arrived at Cuba in the second part of September, and sailed from Havana on 7 October 1973 to Canada. During voyage, ship was repeatedly buzzed by American planes. The ship was loaded with grain in Canada, before sailing to Odessa in the second part of November 1973, and finally on to Novorossiysk port.

The ship was docked in Cuba at the end of March and in April 1975.

The ship docked in Haiphong port, Vietnam, in the second half of June, and in the first half of August 1975.

In October 1975 the ship visited Japan.

=== From 1976 to 1986 ===
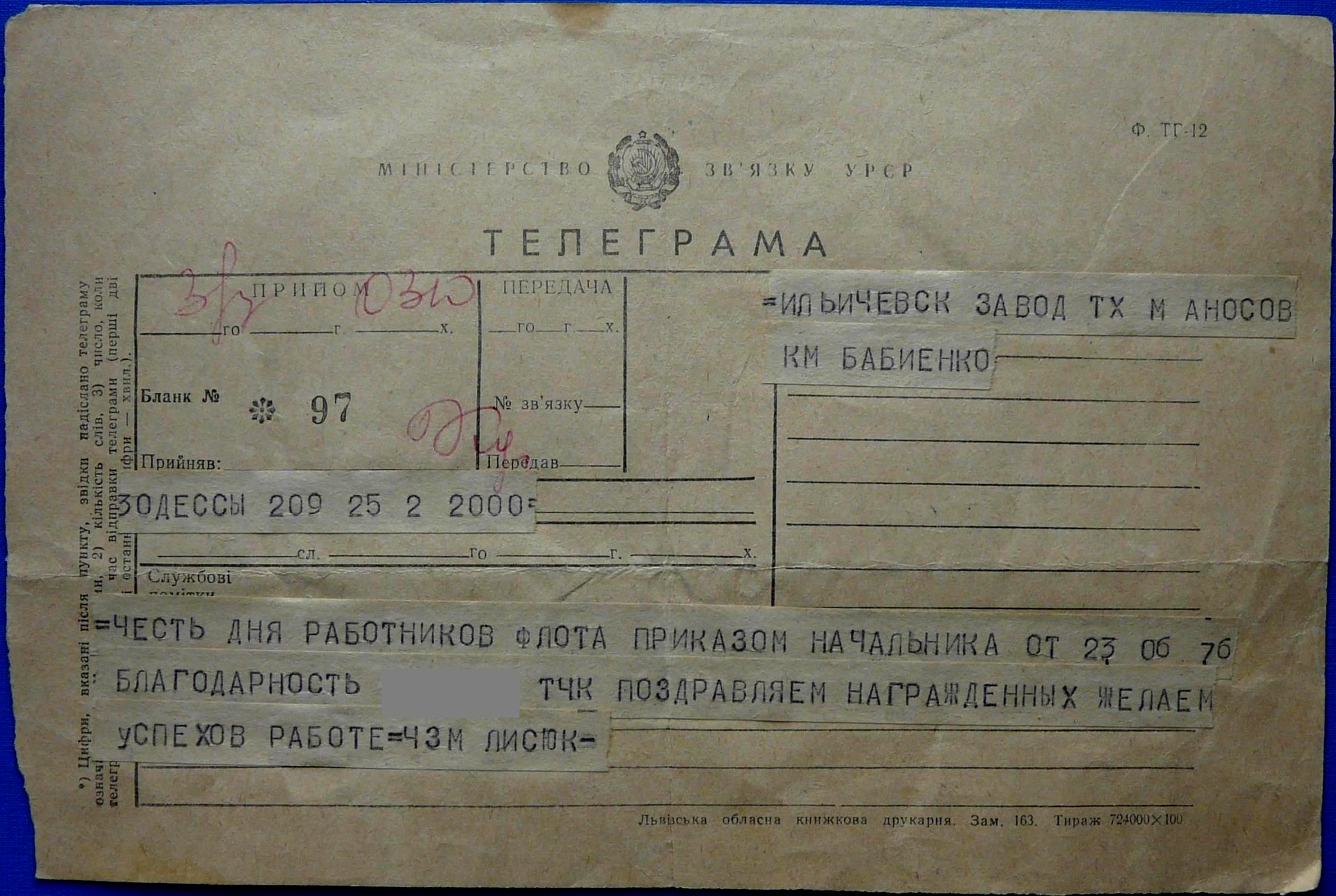
From: representative of Black Sea Shipping Company To: ship Metallurg Anosov in Illichevsk Shipyard, captain Babiyenko. "In honour of the Day of Sea Workers and as per Decree of the Head of Shipping Company dated 23 of June 1976 it is declared a gratitude to Nicholay (surname is closed). Congratulations to the awarded crew members, we wish success in your works. ChZM Lisyuk". The telegram was sent on 2 July and received on 3 July 1976.

Metallurg Anosov visited Angola once, in 1976. The ship brought in military cargo to Luanda.

The ship was under repair in Ilyichevsk Shipyard in the summer of 1976.

Metallurg Anosov arrived in Odessa from Rijeka on 19 of February, 1977.

The ship was on Cuba in the first part of May 1979, again to deliver missiles and other military cargo.

=== Final journey and scrapping ===
Metallurg Anosov was sold for scrap on 21 March 1986 and renamed Anosov. The ship's home port and flag were changed to George Town, Cayman Islands. The ship arrived in China in May 1986. Anosov proceeded to Qinhuangdao and scrapped on 22 May 1986.

== Stamps ==
The SS Metallurg Anosov was featured on a postage stamp issued in 2008, and another issued in 2013.

This was the only Soviet ship mentioned in Cuban Missile Crisis and Cold War stamps, as it was involved in both the Cuban Missile Crisis and other Cold War operations.

== See also ==
- Operation Anadyr
- Cuban blockade
- Cuban Missile Crisis
- Leninsky Komsomol class cargo ships
