= Tweendecker =

Type of cargo ship

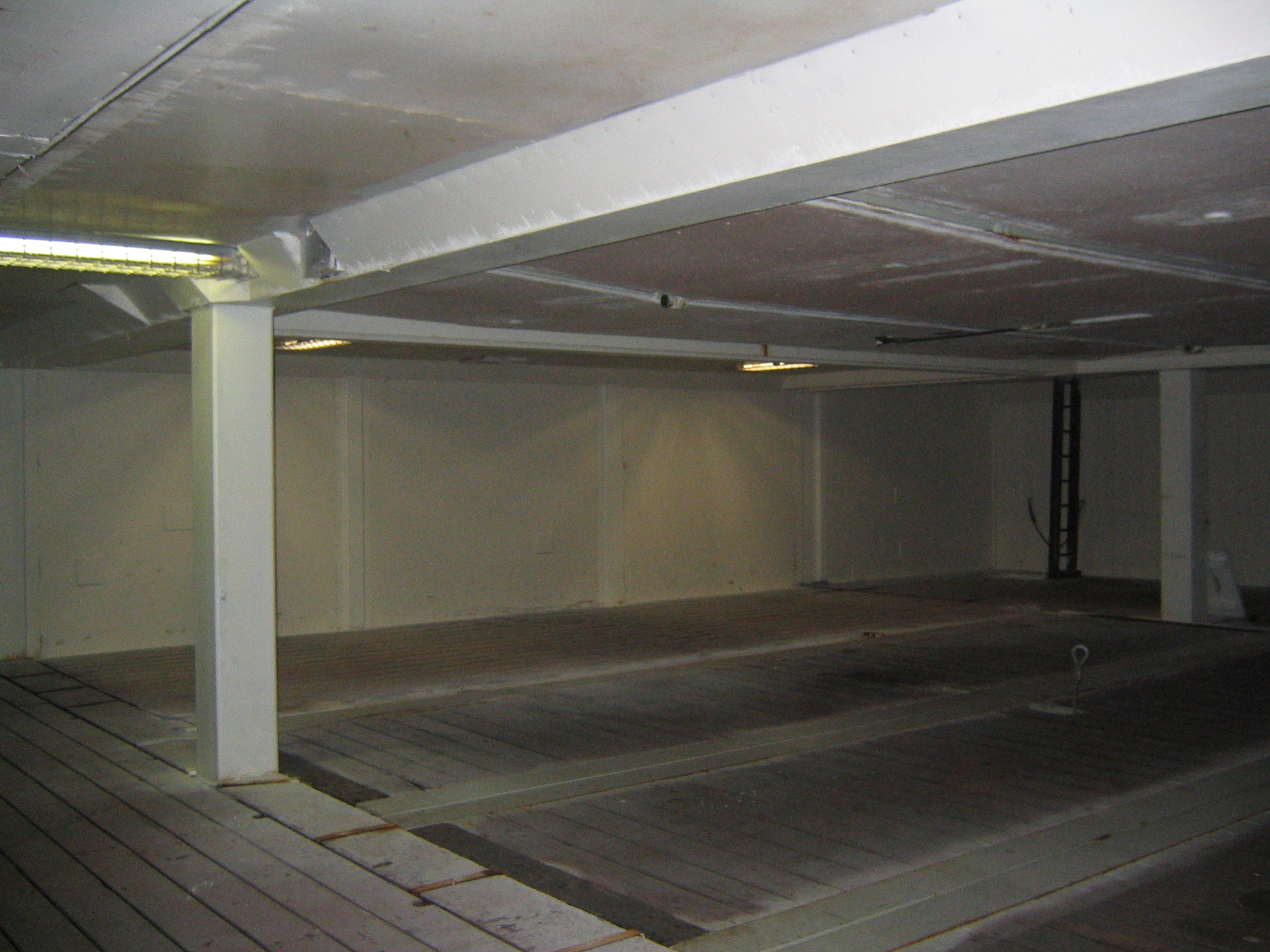
Tweendeck compartment

Tweendeckers are general cargo ships with two or sometimes three decks. The upper deck is called the main deck or weather deck, and the next lower deck is the tweendeck. Cargo such as bales, bags, or drums can be stacked in the tweendeck space, atop the tweendeck. Beneath the tweendeck is the hold space, used for general cargo. Cargo ships that have fittings to carry standard shipping containers and retractable tweendecks (that can be moved out of the way) so that the ship can carry bulk cargo are known as multipurpose vessels.
