= MV Delphin =

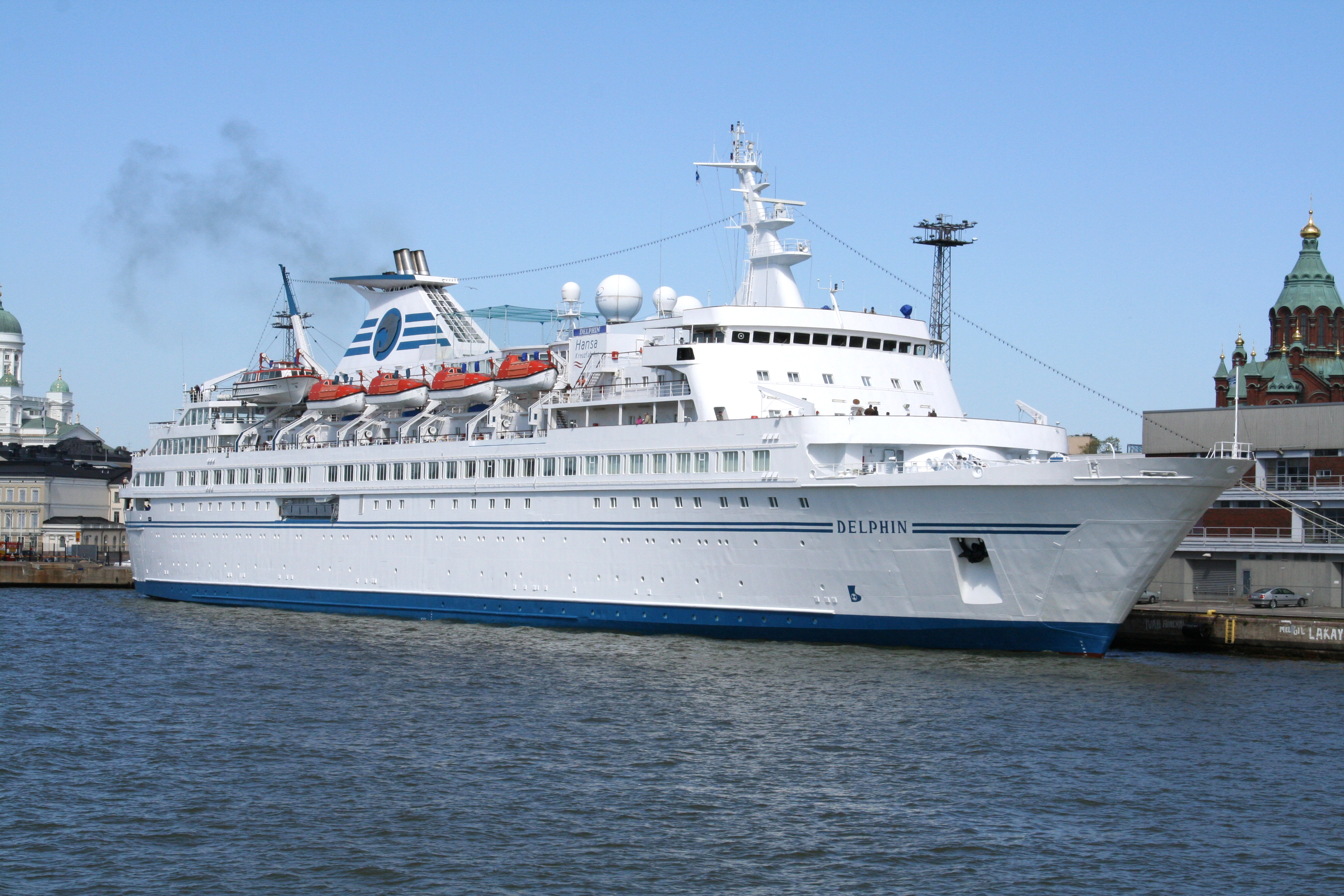
- Delphin in Helsinki South Harbour, May 2009

History
- Name: 1975-1993: Byelorussiya; 1993-1996: Kazakhstan II; 1996-2022: Delphin
- Namesake: Belorussiya (2nd name)
- Owner: 1975–1995: Black Sea Shipping Company; 1995-1996: Lady Lou Shipping Co. Ltd.; 1996-2006: Dolphin Maritime Ltd.; 2007-2010: Delphin Shipping Ltd.; 2011-2022: Vishal Cruises Pvt. Ltd.
- Operator: 1993-2004: Delphin Seereisen; 2004-2010: Hansa Kreuzfahrten; 2012-2022: Passat Kreuzfahrten
- Port of registry: 1975-1993: Odesa, Soviet Union; 1993-1995: Odesa, Ukraine; 1995-1996: Limassol, Cyprus; 1996-2006 La Valletta, Malta; 2007-2022: Nassau, Bahamas
- Builder: Wärtsilä Turku Shipyard, Finland
- Yard number: 1212
- Launched: 6 March 1974
- Acquired: 1975
- In service: 1975
- Identification: Call sign: C6ZV6; IMO number: 7347536; MMSI number: 311067500
- Fate: Beached for scrapping in Aliaga

General characteristics
- Type: Cruise ship
- Tonnage: 16.331 GT; 2.251 DWT
- Length: 156.27 m (512.70 ft)
- Beam: 22.05 m (72.34 ft)
- Height: 16.30 m (53.48 ft)
- Draught: 5.90 m (19.36 ft)
- Decks: 7
- Installed power: 2 × 18 cyl.four stroke single acting Pielstick-Wärtsilä diesel engines type 18PC2-2V; 13,240 kW (combined)
- Propulsion: 2 x Controllable pitch propellers
- Speed: 21.5 knots (39.8 km/h; 24.7 mph)
- Capacity: 640 passengers

MV Delphin was a cruise ship owned by the Mauritius-based Vishal Cruises Pvt. Ltd., under charter to the Germany-based Passat Kreuzfahrten. Built 1975 by Oy Wärtsilä Ab Turku Shipyard in Finland and renovated 1986 and 1993 by Lloyd Werft, Bremerhaven, Germany and got converted into a cruise ship, with her bow unloading doors permanently welded. In 1992, while being serviced at Singapore's Singmarine Dockyard, she toppled over when a floating dock sank with her in it. In 1993, she went through renovations at Lloyd-Werft again and got completely modernized and elegantly re-equipped. At the same time, the Delphin Seereisen and later Delphin-owned Hansa Kreuzfahrten of Germany, had been chartered until bankruptcy. The ship was managed by MTC Marine Trade Consulting GmbH.

Due to the insolvency of Delphin Kreuzfahrten in October 2010, ship was not returned until late 2011 which had been sold to Vishal Cruises Pvt. Ltd.

Sister ships are: Azerbaizhan, Gruziya, Kareliya and Kazakhstan. As of February 7, 2018, MV Delphin is chartered by the first cruise line in the Argentine Republic, Alteza Cruises The Delphin operate from the Port of the city of Buenos Aires with various itineraries including Patagonia, southern Brazil, southern Chile and Antarctica.

The shipping company Alteza never started operations, giving rise to the accusations of fraud that had been published by the Argentine digital newspaper Noticias de Cruceros. MV Delphin - 04.03.2022 was sold to a Turkish scrap metal trader and scrapped in Aliaga.

== See also ==
- Belorussiya-class cruiseferry
