= MS Salamis Filoxenia =

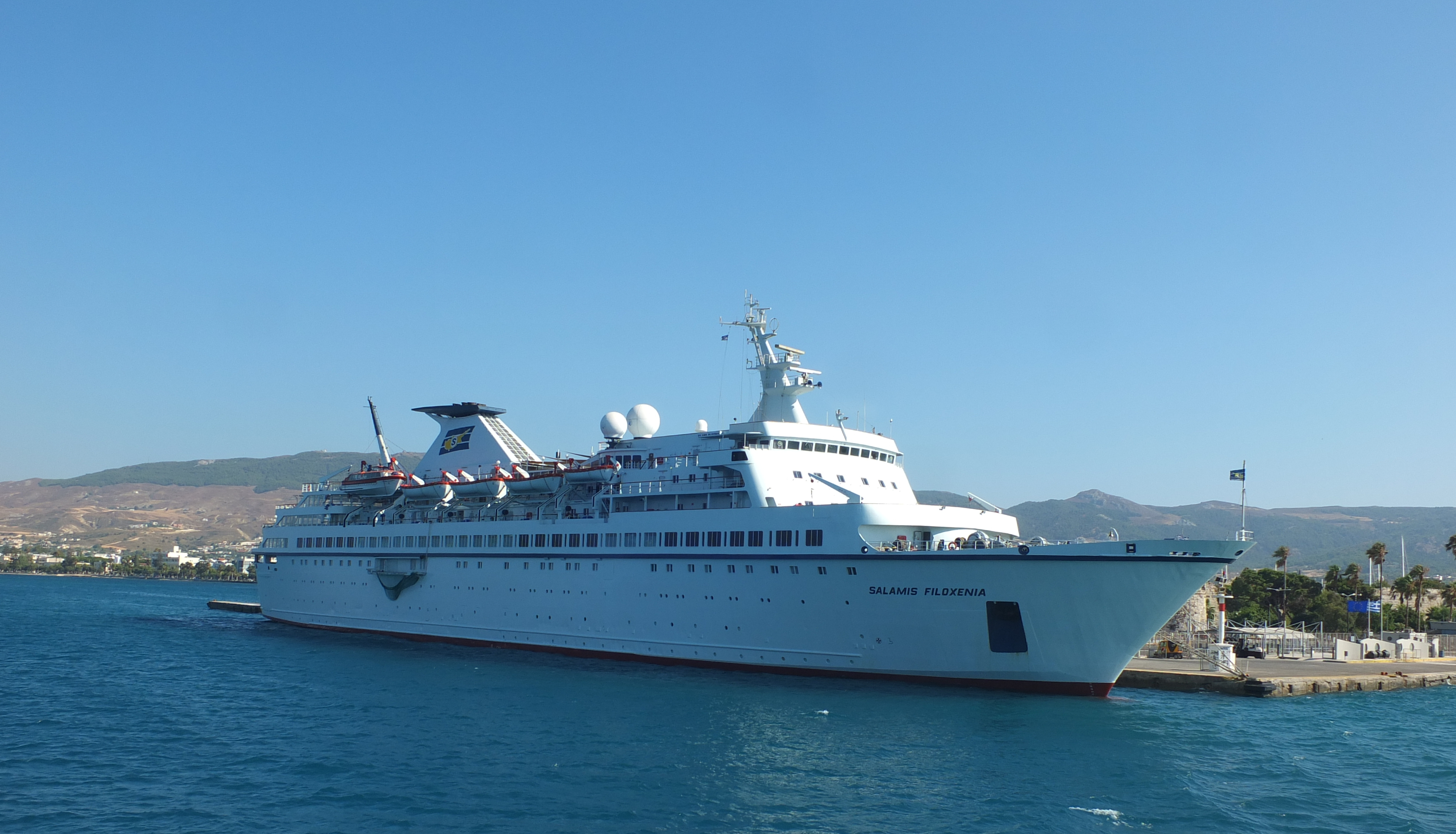
- Salamis Filoxenia at Kos in 2013.

History
- Name: 1975–1995: Gruziya; 1995–1999: Odessa Sky; 1999–1999: Club 1; 1999–2009: Van Gogh; 2009–2022: Salamis Filoxenia; March 2022–April 2022: Phoenix Titan; April 2022: Titan
- Namesake: Gruziya: Georgian Soviet Socialist Republic; Van Gogh: Vincent van Gogh; Salamis Filoxenia Salamis
- Owner: 1975–1995: Black Sea Shipping Company; 1995–1998: Blasco UK; 1998–2009: Club Cruise; 2009–2022: Salamis Lines; March 2022–April 2022: Prime Spot Ship Trading of Dubai
- Operator: 1975–1995: Black Sea Shipping Company; 1995–1996: Blasco UK; 1996–1999: laid up/rebuilt; 1999: Club Cruise; 1999–2002: Nouvelles Frontieres; 2002–2007: Travelscope; 2008: Van Gogh Cruises; 2008: Metropolis Tur
- Port of registry: 1975–1991: Odesa, Soviet Union; 1991–1995: Odesa, Ukraine; 1995–1996: Monrovia, Liberia; 1996–1999: Odesa, Ukraine; 1999–2006: Kingstown, Saint Vincent and the Grenadines; 2006–2009: Majuro, Marshall Islands; 2009–2022: Limassol, Cyprus; 2022: Saint Kitts and Nevis
- Builder: Wärtsilä Turku Shipyard, Finland
- Cost: $ 25 million
- Yard number: 1213
- Launched: 18 October 1974
- Completed: 1975
- Acquired: 30 June 1975
- Maiden voyage: 1975
- In service: 1975
- Out of service: 2022
- Identification: IMO number: 7359400
- Fate: Scrapped at Gadani, Pakistan in 2022.

General characteristics (as built)
- Class & type: Belorussiya-class cruiseferry
- Tonnage: 16,331 GRT; 3,004 DWT
- Length: 156.27 m (512 ft 8 in)
- Beam: 22.05 m (72 ft 4 in)
- Draught: 5.90 m (19 ft 4 in)
- Depth: 16.31 m (53 ft 6 in)
- Decks: 9
- Ice class: ICE-C
- Installed power: 2 × Wärtsilä-Pielstick 18PC2V diesels; combined 13240 kW
- Propulsion: Two propellers
- Speed: 21 kn (38.89 km/h) (service speed)
- Capacity: 1,009 passengers; 504 passenger berths; 256 cars
- Crew: 216

General characteristics (as Salamis Filoxenia)
- Class & type: none
- Type: Cruise ship
- Tonnage: 15,402 GT; 2,452 DWT
- Decks: 7 (passenger accessible)
- Capacity: 506 passengers (795 maximum)

MS Salamis Filoxenia was a cruise ship formerly owned by the Cyprus-based Salamis Cruises, but sold, as the company closed business. She was built in 1975 by Wärtsilä Turku Shipyard as the Belorussiya class-cruiseferry Gruziya for the Black Sea Shipping Company, Soviet Union. She was rebuilt into a cruise ship during the 1980s. In 1995, she was renamed Odessa Sky and in 1999 briefly Club 1 before renamed Van Gogh later in 1999. In 2009, she was acquired by her current owner and renamed Salamis Filoxenia. The ship was later renamed as Titan and sold to ship-breakers in Gadani, Pakistan where she was scrapped in 2022.

== Concept and construction ==
The Gruziya was one of five cruiseferries built between 1975 and 1976 for the Black Sea Shipping Company for intra-Soviet Union service on the Black Sea. The ships were built to the same standards of technology and passenger accommodation as cruiseferries built outside the Eastern Bloc at the time. As built she was able to accommodate 1009 passengers (504 with cabin berths) and 256 cars. In practice her passenger capacity was excessive in comparison with her car capacity, but her relatively high standard of accommodation made her popular as a cruise ship, and during the 1980s she was rebuilt as a cruise ship. The precise year of her rebuilding is unknown, with different sources stating either 1984 or 1988 as the year of the refit.

In 1999, the ship was rebuilt at Bremerhaven, Germany, before entering service for Club Cruise.

== Service history ==
=== 1975–1996 ===
After she was delivered to the Black Sea Shipping Company, the Gruziya was used on ferry service between the Crimean Peninsula and the Caucasus, as well as cruising. For cruise service she was often chartered to operators outside the Eastern Bloc, but she did also make cruises aimed at Soviet passengers. Following the conversion into a cruise ship she was (naturally) used exclusively for cruising.

In 1984, the vessel figured prominently in negotiations by the Soviet Union to act as lodging for Olympic personnel other than athletes and trainers, for equipment storage and recreational space during the 1984 Summer Olympics in Los Angeles, with the Soviets requesting permission for the Gruziya to dock in Long Beach harbor for the duration of the Games. U.S. President Reagan, in National Security Decision Directive Number 135, gave permission for the Gruziya to dock at Pier 2, Berth 53, where it would be watched closely by the U.S. Coast Guard and its radio transmissions prohibited for the duration of its stay. Despite work spent securing the vessel's berth in Long Beach harbor, the ship's necessity was negated when the Soviets' announced that they were boycotting the Olympic Games.

Following the collapse of the Soviet Union in 1991 the Black Sea Shipping Company came to be based in the newly independent state of Ukraine, and the Gruziya hoisted the Ukrainian flag. In 1995, she was transferred under the ownership of Blasco UK, re-registered to Liberia and renamed Odessa Sky. On 26 August 1995 the vessel was arrested in Montreal, Quebec, Canada, and remained there for several months. In August 1996 she was re-registered to Odesa. On 11 September 1996 the ship arrived in Wilhelmshaven, Germany for an engine overhaul. Blasco could not pay for the overhaul, and as a result the Odessa Sky was arrested in Wilhelmshaven. Her crew remained on board, unpaid.

=== 1997 onwards ===
In August 1998 the Odessa Sky was sold in an auction to the Dutch businessman Gerard van Leest for 16.5 million Deutsche Mark. The crew of the ship however refused to leave the ship unless they were paid the two years worth of salaries Blasco owed them, and even threatened to sink the ship should their demands not be met. A settlement was eventually reached where the crew were given flight tickets home and even money for newer clothes, and the Odessa Sky could proceed to Bremerhaven for rebuilding for her new service.

On 27 March 1999 the Odessa Sky was renamed Club I and re-registered to Saint Vincent and the Grenadines. From April 1999 onwards she made short cruises out of Rotterdam under the banner of Club Cruise. The Club 1 failed to find popularity in The Netherlands, and as a result the planned winter program was cancelled and the ship was laid up in September 1999. In December 1999 Nouvelles Frontieres, a France based group, chartered the Club 1 and renamed her Van Gogh for cruises around the Mediterranean and Caribbean. In 2002 she was chartered to the United Kingdom-based Travelscope.

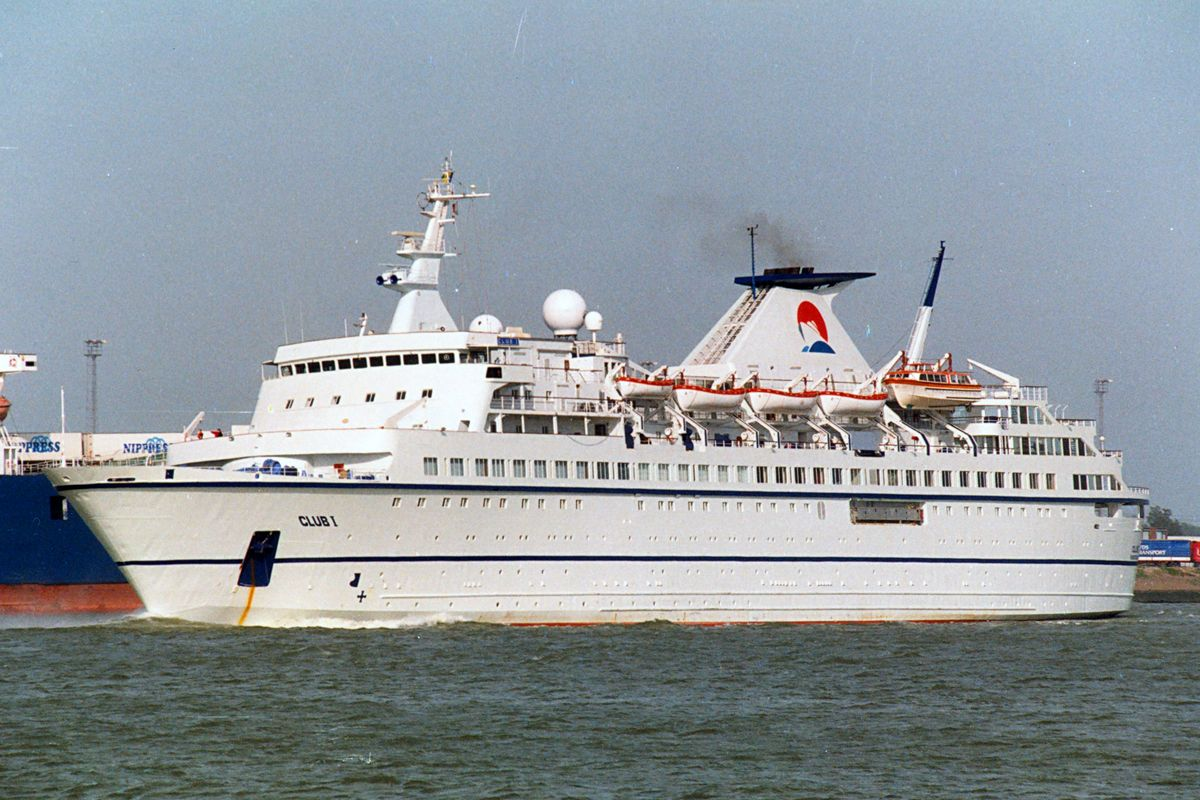
MS Club l in Hoek van Holland, 1999

On September 26, 2004, the Van Gogh, while outbound from Gibraltar to Tangier, collided with the tanker Spetses outside Gibraltar in heavy fog. The Van Gogh received heavy damage to her bow, but there were no injuries on either ship and the Van Gogh could return to Gibraltar for repairs under her own power. Later investigations revealed the Van Gogh had been traveling at 14 kn (25.93 km/h), a speed considered unsafe under the weather conditions. Additionally the crew of the Van Gogh had neglected to give proper audio signals for restricted visibility and the crews of both vessels had neglected to keep proper radar watch. No emergency signal had been sounded on the Van Gogh before or after the accident, resulting in confusion amongst her passengers.

Traveloscope went bankrupt in December 2007, but Club Cruise took over the ship's planned 2008 world cruise. In January 2008, Club Cruise established a new subsidiary, Van Gogh Cruises, which took over all existing bookings for the Van Gogh and planned to continue to operate her in the UK market. Due to difficulties in acquiring a membership in the Association of British Travel Agents, Van Gogh Cruises were forced to suspend operations in April 2008. As a result, the Van Gogh was chartered to the Russia-based Metropolis Tur for the 2008 Northern Hemisphere summer season.

During the final leg of her 2007/2008 world cruise, the Van Gogh was arrested by police in Funchal, Madeira on 1 April 2008, in a dispute over an unpaid debt from a previous operator. She was allowed to depart Funchal for Falmouth after some 48 hours on 3 April.

In July 2009, following the bankruptcy of Club Cruise, Van Gogh was sold in an auction at Eleusis, Greece to the Cyprus-based Salamis Cruises for $ 6.5 million. Van Gogh replaced the MS Salamis Glory on short cruises out of Limassol.

== Design ==
=== Exterior ===
The Belorussiya class ships were built with an exterior appearance that was in keeping with the aesthetic of the time, described by Douglas Ward in 2006 as being "reasonably smart-looking – with a square-ish 1970s profile". The hull of the ships had a rounded bow and a rear that tapered inwards so that at the very back the width of the hull was only marginally wider than the width of the large central car-ramp (however, in addition to the ramp at the rear, side doors were fitted on the starboard side) The lowest deck of the superstructure (deck 6) extended slightly beyond the width of the hull, resulting an appearance similar to the overhanging promenade decks of many ocean liners. Deck 6 also extended further than the higher decks of the superstructure, originally in a wedge-like form. The rear decks were tiered, with glass screens protecting the lido area on deck 7. Lifeboats were fairly high in the superstructure. The fairly large funnel included a smoke deflector fin.

During the conversion into a cruise ship, the forward superstructure on deck 6 was enlarged to that it extends all the way to the sides for the full length of the deck. In 1999, refit the rear car-ramp was removed.

=== Interior ===
As built, all public spaces on board were located on deck 6, with most passenger cabins on deck 5, additional cabins on the sides of the car deck on decks 3 & 4, and deluxe cabins on deck 7. Originally the interiors were decorated in contemporary modernist style, with bright colours combined with dark brown, psychedelic patterns in curtains and dark wood veneer used on many walls, particularly in the cabins.

In the conversion to a cruise ship carried out during the 1980s, the upper level of the car deck (deck 4) was built in with 80 cabins, while a cinema and a bar/casino complex was added to the lower level (deck 3). Initially a small garage for 50–70 cars was retained.

Following the 1999 refit, the public spaces include five bars, a dining room, self-serve buffet, casino, discotheque, cinema, library, gymnasium, sauna and one swimming pool. During the 1999 refit, two additional suites were added on deck 8.
