= Belorussiya-class cruiseferry =

Class of cruiseferries

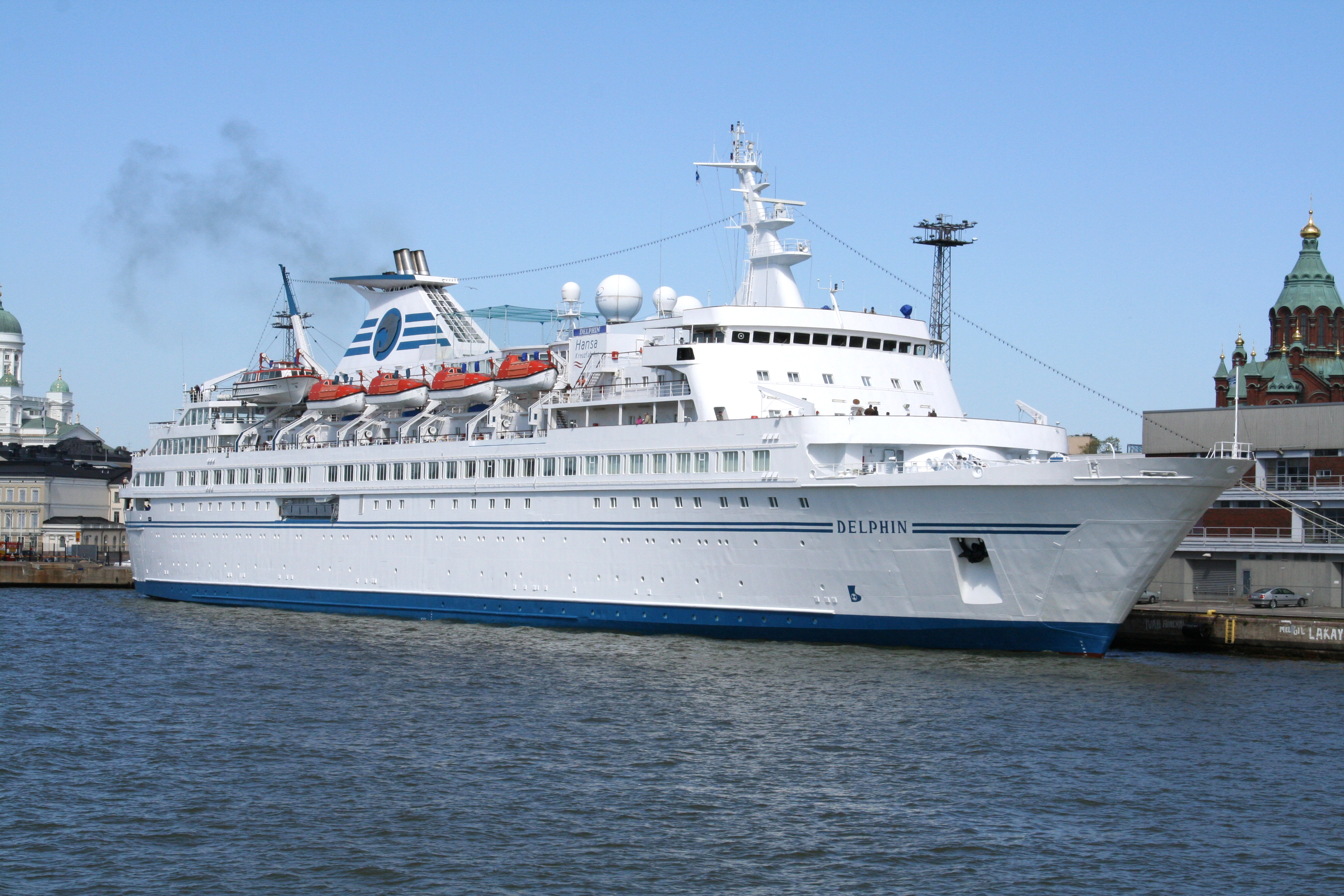
- Delphin in Helsinki South Harbour, May 2009

Class overview
- Builders: Wärtsilä Turku Shipyard, Turku, Finland
- Operators: Numerous
- Built: 1975–1976
- In service: 1975–2020
- Completed: 5
- Lost: 1
- Retired: 4

General characteristics (as built)
- Type: Cruiseferry
- Tonnage: 16,331 GRT; 2,251 DWT
- Length: 156.27 m (512 ft 8 in)
- Beam: 22.05 m (72 ft 4 in)
- Draught: 5.90 m (19 ft 4 in)
- Depth: 16.31 m (53 ft 6 in)
- Decks: 9
- Ice class: ICE-C
- Installed power: 2 × Wärtsilä-Pielstick 18PC2V diesels; combined 13,240 kW (17,760 hp)
- Propulsion: Two propellers
- Speed: 21.50 knots (39.82 km/h; 24.74 mph)
- Capacity: 872 passengers; 480 passenger berths; 256 cars
- Crew: 216

The Belorussiya class was a class of cruiseferries (sometimes also referred to as the Gruziya class) that were built by Wärtsilä Turku Shipyard, Finland, in 1975–1976 for the Black Sea Shipping Company, Soviet Union. The five ships in the class were originally used in cruiseferry service around the Black Sea. During the 1980s all ships in the class were rebuilt into cruise ships. During the end of the 1990s all ships in the class were sold to other operators. The remaining ships in this class ended service in 2020. All ships as of 2022 have been scrapped except for Enchanted Capri, which was shipwrecked on the Gulf coast of Mexico and only has partially been dismantled.

== Concept and construction ==
During the early 1970s, the Black Sea Shipping Company of the Soviet Union decided to order five cruiseferries to be used on domestic traffic around the Black Sea. Instead of having the ships built domestically or ordering them from Comecon member states, the new ships were ordered from the Wärtsilä shipyards in neutral Finland.

The Belorussiya-class ships were built to the same standards of technology and passenger comfort as the cruiseferries built in the western world at the time. They were also amongst the largest cruiseferries of their time, surpassing the largest cruiseferries built in the west at the same time (MS Tor Britannia and MS Tor Scandinavia) in terms of gross register tonnage.

When the Belorussiya-class ships entered service, it soon turned out their car-carrying capacity was too small in comparison with their passenger-carrying capacity. Due to their high standards of passenger accommodation, it was decided that instead of rebuilding the ships with larger car-decks, they would be converted into cruise ships with minimal car-carrying facilities. Between 1981 and 1988 all ships in the class were rebuilt at West German or British shipyards, with the car decks built in with cabins and additional public spaces, and the forward superstructure slightly expanded.

Following the collapse of the Soviet Union and the sale of the Belorussiya-class ships to different operators around the world, some of the ships have received further rebuildings.

== Service history ==
During their career under the Soviet flag, the Belorussiya-class ships were used on domestic traffic between Crimea and the Caucasus, as well as considerable cruising both for Soviet passengers as well as under charter to travel companies outside the Eastern Bloc. Following the collapse of the Soviet Union, the ships were initially transferred under a Ukrainian flag, then towards the end of the 1990s they were transferred under various flags of convenience but soon afterwards sold off to other operators.

== The ships ==
=== Belorussiya ===
The Belorussiya was launched on 6 March 1974 and delivered on 15 January 1975. She was named after the Byelorussian Soviet Socialist Republic. The Belorussiya was rebuilt into a cruise ship in 1986 at Lloyd Werft, Bremerhaven, West Germany. From 1987 until late 1992, Belorussiya was chartered by CTC Cruises to operate budget cruises from Sydney, Australia to ports in the south Pacific region. During this time, Belorussiya operated from Sydney during the Australian summer and in Europe for the rest of the year. On 25 October 1992, while in drydock in Singapore, the ship developed a heavy list and filled with water. She was eventually floated out in January 1993 and sailed to Lloyd Werft, where her interiors were entirely rebuilt. On completion of the refit on 9 December 1993 she was renamed Kazakhstan II. From 22 December 1993 onwards she was chartered to Delphin Seereisen, Germany. In June 1995 she was sold to Lady Lou Shipping Co, Cyprus. In May 1996 Delphin Seereisen purchased the vessel and renamed her Delphin. The ship stopped operating for passenger service by 2010. The ship was moved to Rijeka, Croatia to be an accommodation ship for shipyard workers until 2017. The ship was laid up and later sold for scrap in 2022. The ship was later beached and has since been scrapped in Aliaga, Turkey within the same year.

=== Gruziya ===
The Gruziya was launched on 18 October 1974 and delivered on 30 June 1975. She was named after the Georgian Soviet Socialist Republic. The Gruziya was rebuilt into a cruise ship between 1984 or 1988, due to different sources stating different years. In 1995 she was transferred under the ownership of Blasco UK, transferred under Liberian flag and renamed Odeassa Sky. On 26 August 1995 she was arrested in Montreal, Quebec, Canada and remained there for at least five months. In August 1996 she reverted to Ukrainian flag. On 11 September 1996 she arrived at Wilhelmshaven, Germany for engine inspection, but was subsequently arrested in the port of Wilhelmshaven due to unpaid debts of her owners. In August 1998 she was sold to the Dutch businessman Gerard van Leest, and subsequently rebuilt in Bremerhaven, Germany for cruise traffic. Renamed Club I, the ship begun making short cruises from Rotterdam under the banner of Club Cruise in April 1999. In December 1999 she was renamed Van Gogh and chartered to Nouvelles Frontieres. She was later chartered to Travelscope, without a change of name, until Travelscope went bankrupt in December 2007. Following the bankruptcy of Travelscope, Club Cruise established a new subsidiary, Van Gogh Cruises to operate the Van Gogh. This was not a success and in 2009 the ship was sold to Salamis Lines, Cyprus and renamed Salamis Filoxenia. The ship remained in service until 2020 when the financial strain from the COVID-19 pandemic shutdown caused the ship's operator to end cruise operations and sell the ship for scrap. The ship was beached in Gadani, Pakistan on April 17, 2022 under the name Titan.

=== Azerbaizhan ===
The Azerbaizhan was launched on 14 April 1975 and delivered on 18 December 1975. She was named after the Azerbaijan Soviet Socialist Republic. The Azerbaizhan was converted to a cruise ship at Lloyd Werft, West Germany in 1986. In early 1996 she was transferred under the ownership of Blasco UK, transferred under Liberian flag and renamed Arkadia, but already in July 1996 she reverted to Ukrainian flag. In 1997 she was chartered to SeaEscape, United States under the name Island Holiday. In 1998 she was chartered to Commodore Cruise Lines and renamed Enchanted Capri. In 2001 she was laid up, until chartered to Señor Demar of Mexico in 2003. Demar purchased the ship on 1 November 2006. The ship was sold in late 2020 with the intentions of being broken up for scrap. While being towed from Coatzacoalcos the ship broke loose and was grounded at Alvarado in October of 2020. The ship was not refloated and became wrecked after it split into two and was subject to damage from rough waves. As of mid-2022 the wreck is still present and has been partially demolished.

=== Kazakhstan ===
The Kazakhstan was launched on 17 October 1975 and delivered in June 1976. She was named after the Kazakh Soviet Socialist Republic. The Kazakhstan was converted to a cruise ship at Lloyd Werft, West Germany in 1984. In December 1994 she was transferred under the ownership of Blasco UK, transferred under Liberian flag and renamed Ukraina. On 2 September 1996 she was chartered to Royal Seas Cruises Lines, reverted to Ukrainian flag and used for cruising from Tampa. After the end of charter in January 1997 she reverted to the name Ukraina and was chartered to SeaEscape. On 13 February 1998 she was renamed Island Adventure but continued service with SeaEscape until the company ceased operations in August 2008. The ship never re-entered service and was sold for scrap in 2011. The ship was scrapped in Alang, India in 2012.

=== Kareliya ===
The Kareliya was launched on 14 April 1976 and delivered in December 1976. She was the only Belorussiya class ship not named after a Soviet Socialist Republic (Karelia being an Autonomous Soviet Socialist Republic at the time). On 1 June 1981 she was grounded while on a cruise near Arrecife, Canary Isles, and her passengers had to be evacuated. Following the grounding she sailed to Tyne, United Kingdom for repairs. In addition to repairs the chance was taken to convert her into a cruise ship. The Kareliya received a more extensive expansion of her forward superstructure than her other sisters. In December 1982 the Kareliya was renamed Leonid Brezhnev in honour of the recently-deceased long-time General Secretary of the Communist Party of the Soviet Union Leonid Brezhnev. In 1989 the ship reverted to her original name.

In 1995 the Kareliya was transferred to Maddock Trading and re-flagged to Liberia. In 1996 she reverted to Ukrainian flag. On 17 March 1997 she was arrested at Nouméa due to debts of her owners. In May 1998 she was sold to Kaalbye Group, renamed Olvia and moved back under the Liberian flag. On 17 September 2001 she was sold to K&O Shipping and used for service with Peace Boat. On 20 December 2004 she was renamed Neptune, on 14 April 2005 CT Neptune and on 27 May 2006 she reverted to Neptune. Subsequently, she was sold to Walden Maritime and used for casino cruising out of Hong Kong. The ship was sold to China International in 2011 and renamed the Starry Metropolis continuing to sail as a gambling ship. Due to the COVID-19 pandemic shutdown in 2020, the ship was in debt and was sold for scrap on March 25, 2021. It was the last casino ship to operate out of Hong Kong, China. The ship was beached in Alang, India on June 14, 2021, and has been since broken up for scrap.
