= GTS Finnjet =

Baltic sea cruise ferry

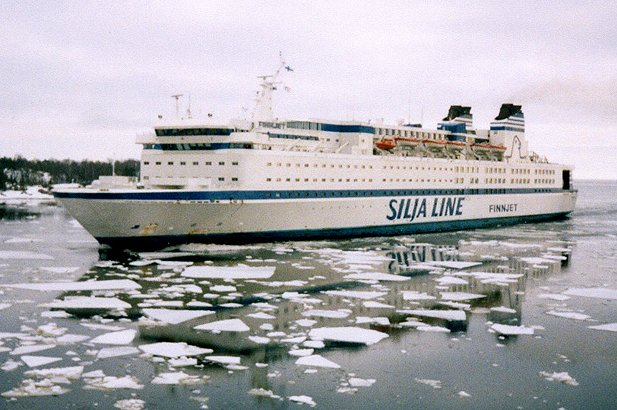
- Finnjet approaching Helsinki in spring 2004.

History
- Name: 1977–2008: Finnjet; 2008: Da Vinci; 2008: Kingdom
- Owner: 1977–1982: Enso-Gutzeit; 1982–1986: Effoa (75%), Enso-Gutzeit (25%); 1986–1989: Effoa; 1989–1991: Partrederiet för GTS Finnjet; 1991–1993: Effdo 1; 1993–1997: Silja Line; 1997–2006: Sally Ab; 2006–2007: Finnjet Bermuda Ltd; 2007–2008: Cruise Ship Holdings Four Ltd
- Operator: 1977–1983: Finnlines; 1983–1987: Finnjet Line; 1987–2005: Silja Line; 2005–2008: laid up
- Port of registry: 1977–1993: Helsinki, Finland; 1993–2006: Mariehamn, Åland; 2006–2008: Nassau, Bahamas; 2008: Panama City, Panama
- Ordered: 5 December 1973
- Builder: Wärtsilä Helsinki Shipyard, Helsinki, Finland
- Yard number: 407
- Laid down: 20 May 1975
- Launched: 28 March 1976
- Christened: 28 April 1977
- Completed: 1977
- Acquired: 28 April 1977
- In service: 13 May 1977
- Out of service: 19 September 2005
- Identification: IMO number: 7359632
- Fate: Scrapped in Alang, India, 2008.

General characteristics (as built)
- Type: Cruiseferry
- Tonnage: 24,605 GRT; 2,825 DWT
- Length: 212.96 m (698 ft 8 in)
- Beam: 24.40 m (80 ft 1 in)
- Draught: 6.60 m (21 ft 8 in)
- Ice class: 1 A Super
- Installed power: 2 × Pratt & Whitney FT4C-1DLF gas turbines; 55,000 kW (74,000 hp) (combined)
- Speed: 31 knots (57 km/h; 36 mph)
- Capacity: 1,800 passengers; 1,532 passenger berths; 380 cars

General characteristics (after 2004 refit)
- Type: Cruiseferry
- Tonnage: 32,975 GT; 2,827 DWT
- Length: 214.96 m (705 ft 3 in)
- Installed power: 2 × Pratt & Whitney FT4C-1DLF gas turbines; 2 × Wärtsilä-Vasa 18V32 diesel engines; 66,400 kW (89,000 hp) (combined)
- Speed: 33.5 knots (62.0 km/h; 38.6 mph)
- Capacity: 1,781 passengers; 1,631 passenger berths; 325 cars; 815 lanemeters
- Crew: 178
- Notes: Otherwise the same as built

The GTS Finnjet was a cruiseferry, built in 1977 by Wärtsilä Helsinki Shipyard, Finland for Finnlines traffic between Finland and Germany. At the time of her delivery, Finnjet was the fastest, longest and largest car ferry in the world, and the only one powered by gas turbines. At the point of her scrapping in 2008, she remained the fastest conventional ferry in the world, with a recorded top speed of 33.5 knots (62.0 km/h; 38.6 mph).

Finnjet had remained out of service since 2005, laid up in Baton Rouge, Freeport and Genoa. Although she was purchased by Club Cruise in November 2007 and renamed MS Da Vinci in January 2008 for rebuilding into a cruise ship, the ship was sold for scrap in May 2008. Following the sale she was renamed MS Kingdom for her final voyage to the scrapyard in Alang, India where scrapping finally started in September 2008.

== Overview ==
Finnjet was built by Wärtsilä at the Helsinki Shipyard (Build-No. 407) in Helsinki, Finland and delivered to Enso-Gutzeit to serve in their subsidiary Finnlines. The ship was built specifically for the route between Helsinki in Finland and Travemünde in West Germany which Finnlines had previously trafficked with slower conventional ferries. The gas turbine engines combination gave a top speed of 31 knots (57 km/h), a one-way crossing was planned to take only 22 hours for the ship. At the time Travemünde was the closest port to Finland in mainland Western Europe, being located in the Federal German state of Schleswig-Holstein just west of the border with East Germany.

In addition to being the largest and fastest ship of her time, Finnjet is also widely considered to have been the first genuine cruiseferry. Her cabins were very much ahead of their time for a ferry, it was not until over a decade later when other ferries would match the size and fittings of Finnjet's cabins. Her restaurants and other services were also superior to other ferries of her time. Finnjet's influence can be clearly seen on the first genuine cruiseferries built for Finland–Sweden traffic in 1980–81, ships such as MS Viking Song, MS Viking Sally and MS Finlandia.

Partially due to being such a ground-breaking ship, Finnjet was also extremely prestigious, which helps explain why she remained in traffic on the Baltic Sea for such a long time even though she was often unprofitable. Famous Finnish painter Kimmo Kaivanto provided paintings and drawings to decorate the ship, and he even designed a Finnjet medallion to commemorate the ship's commission. Kaivanto's main work for the ship, the three-deck high Pictures of Finland, was given to the Finnish Maritime Museum in 2007, destined for display in the museum from 2008 onwards. In 1977 a 7-inch single, "Finnjet Waltz", was recorded in honour of the ship, and she was the first ship ever to have a Lego model of her for sale on board. As late as the early 1990s Silja Line still considered Finnjet to be one of their greatest ships, and in their brochures she appeared right after the brand-new Helsinki–Stockholm ferries, ahead of many ships that were both newer and larger than Finnjet herself was. Finnjet still remains the best-known individual ship in Finland. She also has a very good reputation in Germany, and in August 2006, Silja Line's new owners Tallink went on record considering adapting the name 'Finnjet' for their Finland–Germany ferries (to the dismay of ferry enthusiasts in Finland and Germany). However Finnjet is a registered trademark of Finnlines (until 2017) and therefore Tallink could not go ahead with their plan.

== Concept and construction ==
In the beginning of the 1970s a study was made about the future development of passenger numbers on the ferry service between Finland and West Germany. The study projected notable growth, with 300,000 to 800,000 passenger projected to make a crossing in 1980, with the likeliest number projected at 500,000. At the time Finnlines and Finland Steamship Company were maintaining a joint service on the route with two ships built during the latter half of the 1960s (MS Finnhansa (1966) and MS Finlandia (1966), respectively), both capable of transporting a maximum of 100,000 passengers per year. Based on the estimates made Enso-Gutzeit, one of the owners of Finnlines, begun planning a new, larger and faster ferry for the service. Initial plans made in 1971 called for a ship with 800 passenger berths (the Finnhansa had only 300 at the time), but these were abandoned in favour of an even larger ship. The plans for the new ship, codenamed Finnjet, were developed within the next two years.

Project Finnjet was developed into a much larger ship than the Finnhansa or Finlandia. Finnjet was to have 1,500 passenger berths and the ship would be powered by two gas turbines instead of the traditional diesel engines. Gas turbines would give her a service speed of 30.5 knots (56.5 km/h; 35.1 mph) (compared to the 20 knots (37 km/h; 23 mph) of the Finnhansa), making it possible to cut the passage time between Helsinki and Travemünde from 36 hours to just 22 hours. Advanced loading systems developed for the ship meant her port turnaround time would be just two hours. These factors combined meant that Finnjet would have a yearly passenger capacity of over 300,000.

As a temporary measure to cover for the rising passenger numbers Thomesto Oy, another member of the Finnlines consortium, purchased the 1966-built MS Finnpartner (1973) and placed it in Finnlines traffic in 1973. On 5 December 1973 Enso-Gutzeit placed an order for project Finnjet with the Wärtsilä Hietalahti shipyard in Helsinki, Finland. The cost of the ship has been estimated at being between 200 and 300 million Finnish markka, making her the largest investment made to Finnish tourism by that time. At the time Finnjet was in fact planned as the first in a pair of identical sisters. The build contract included an option for a second vessel that was offered to the Finland Steamship Company as a part of the joint service agreement between Finland SS Co and Finnlines, but Finland SS Co decided not to utilise the option.

Following further refining of the plans to the ship by the shipyard, the keel of Project Finnjet was laid on 20 May 1975. In a traditional ceremony, coins were thrown onto the keel to wish the ship good luck. These coins were then welded on the keel. By 1975 it was clear that the growth predictions based on which the plans of Finnjet had been made had been overtly positive. At the time Finnlines and Finland Steamship Company were negotiating the formation of a joint subsidiary for their cargo-carrying operations. To ensure the success of Finnjet, Enso-Gutzeit and Finnlines were eager to induce Finland Steamship Company to withdraw from the Finland–West Germany passenger services completely. This was successful, and as a part of the agreement of forming Finncarriers as a joint subsidiary of Finnlines and Finland Steamship Company the latter withdrew from the Finland–West Germany passenger service, selling their Finlandia to Finnlines (in exchange for the ro-ro freighter MS Finncarrier).

The construction of Finnjet was not without mishaps, as on 24 March 1976 a fire broke out in the bow thruster room but was quickly brought under control. On 28 March 1976 the ship was launched from drydock without ceremonies. As "Finnjet" was only a working name given to the ship, other names were considered by Enso-Gutzeit as the final name of the vessel. Naming the ship after Urho Kekkonen, President of the Republic of Finland at the time, was considered. Eventually the project name Finnjet was chosen as the official name of the ship.

Coinciding with the work done on the ship itself work was carried out in the Port of Helsinki in order to accommodate the large ship. The Kustaanmiekka strait leading to Helsinki South Harbour had to be widened so that Finnjet could safely sail through it. A former warehouse at Katajanokka, Helsinki was rebuilt as a ferry terminal that would be exclusively used by Finnjet (today the same terminal is used by Viking Line).

Finnjet undertook her first sea trial between 9 and 12 December 1976. Testing the gas turbines of the ship revealed that the original hull structure could not withstand the water pressure caused by the 30.5 knots (56.5 km/h; 35.1 mph) service speed, and on returning to the shipyard various parts of the ship had to be strengthened. On 1 March 1977 the ship sailed from Helsinki to Kiel in West Germany, where she was drydocked and her bottom painted. On the return voyage from Kiel she also visited Travemünde for the first time. The second test cruise of the ship was carried out on 14 March 1977. On 28 April 1977 Finnjet was delivered to Finnlines in a ceremony at the Finnjet terminal in Katajanokka, Helsinki. The ship was officially christened as a part of the same ceremony by Annikki Mattila, the wife of Enso-Gutzeit CEO Olavi J. Mattila. The actual christening ceremony took place on the car deck of the ship.

== Service history ==
=== 1977–1987 ===
The Finnjet's maiden voyage was originally scheduled to depart from Helsinki on 1 May 1977. However, this was delayed due to an engine officers' strike. Finally the ship left on her maiden voyage on 13 May 1977, after a final turbine test drive had been carried out on 12 May 1977.

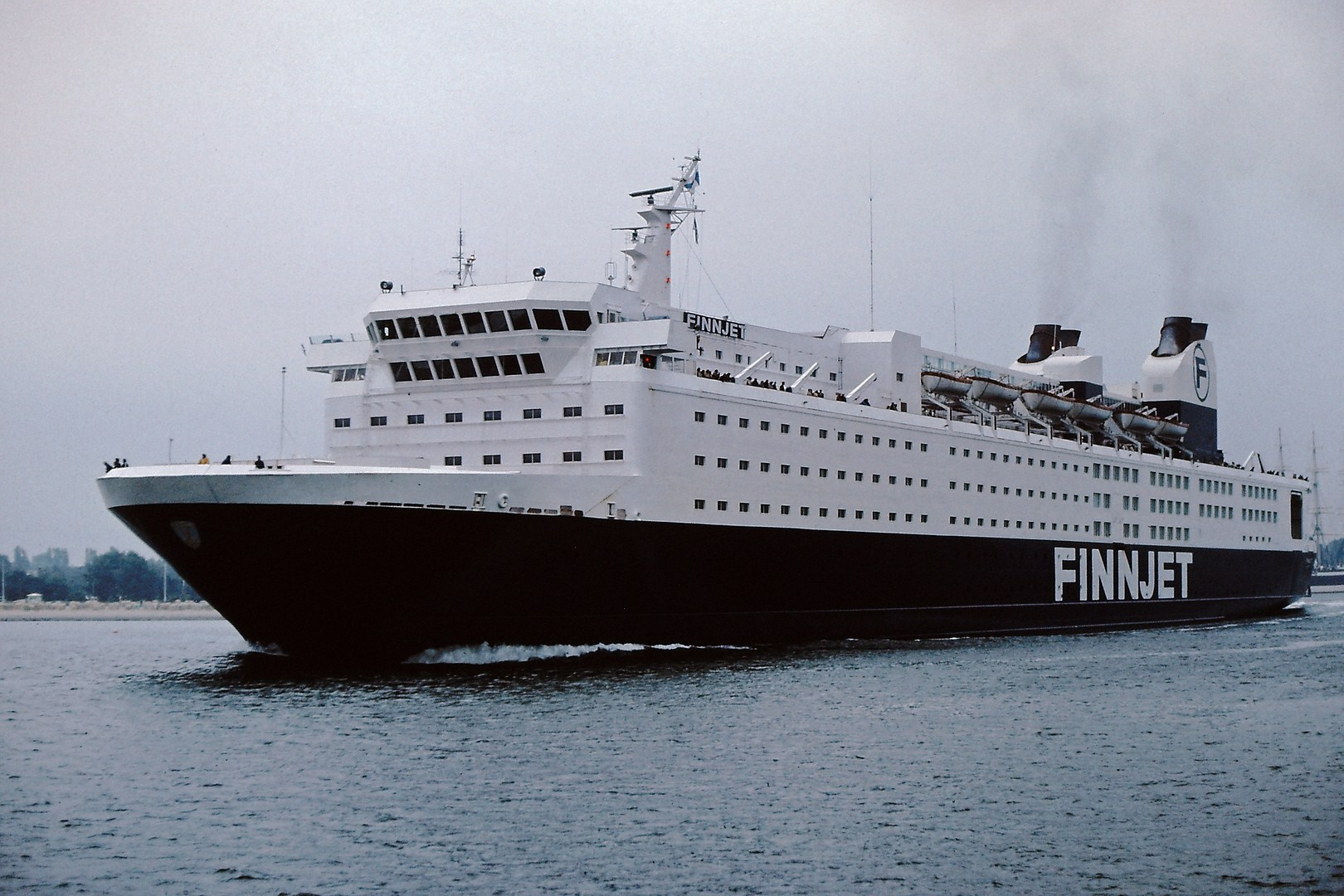
Finnjet

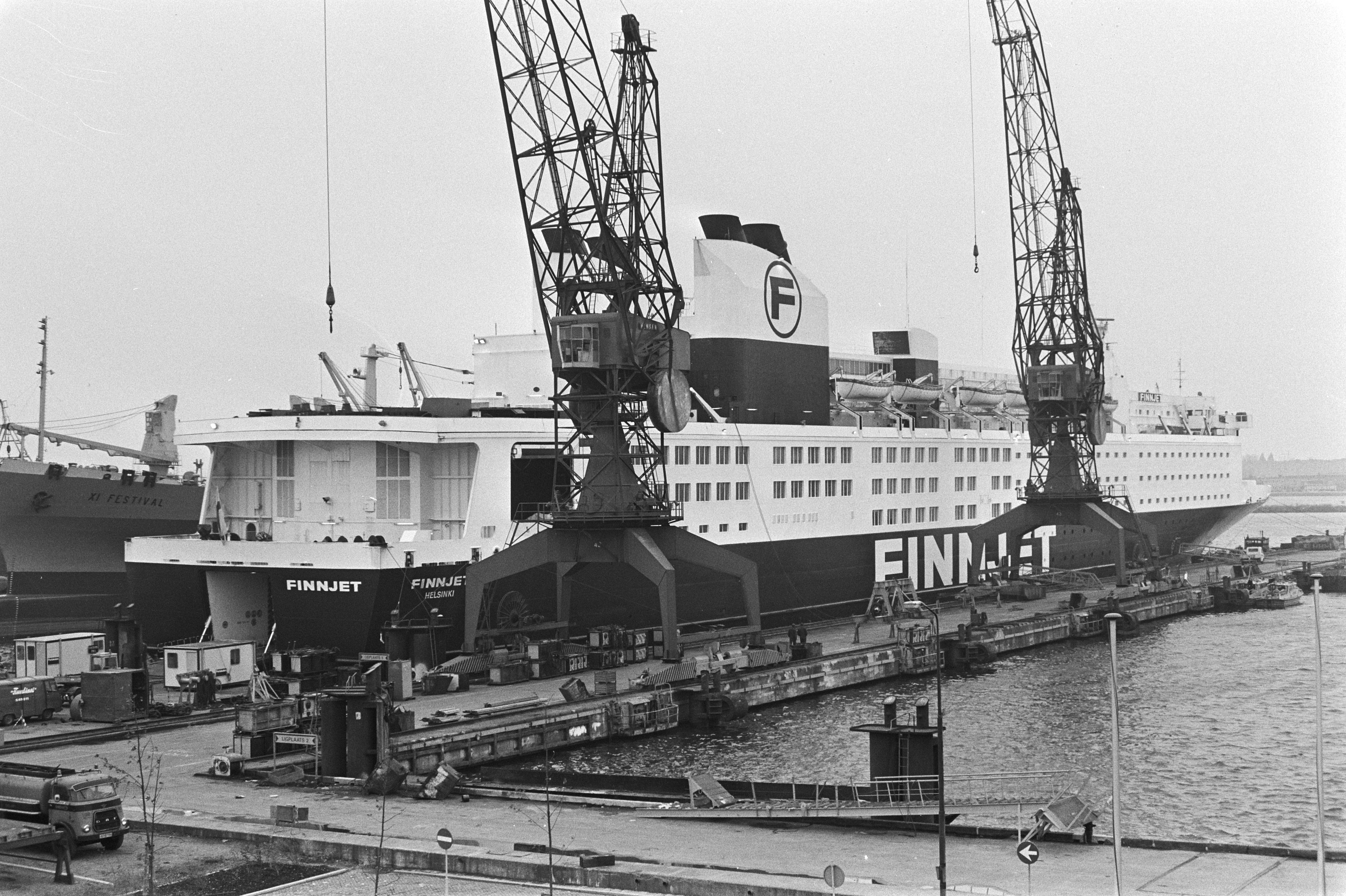
Finnjet in 1981

Finnjet's estimated fuel consumption for the 22-hour travel time was 300 tonnes of fuel; approx 350,000 litres total or 16,000 litres per hour. Initially Finnjet was not a very profitable ship and after only a few years of service there were rumours that she would be sold. The ship had been ordered in the same year as the beginning of the 1973 oil crisis, which reached its peak around the time of the ship's launch. Yet another huge leap of the oil price occurred near the turn of the decade. To increase her profitability, the ship was converted to a combined diesel-electric and gas propulsion with the addition of diesel-electric generators in 1981 in Amsterdamse Droogdok Maatschappij, Amsterdam. The change allowed to operate the ship at slower speeds, using cheaper fuel during the winter months. On the way to the shipyard she became the largest ship to have passed through the Kiel Canal at that time.

A year later 75% of Finnjet's shares were sold to Effoa (one of the owners of Silja Line), and Finnjet Line was established as a joint venture of Finnlines and Effoa to operate Finnjet. Starting from November 1985, Finnjet made 24-hour (later 22-hour) backtracking cruises from Helsinki during the winter season. The final batch of these cruises in October–December 1995 included a short stop in Tallinn. In January 1986 another major renovation was carried out at Wärtsilä Helsinki, with new Commodore-class cabins added in place of the old sundeck. Shortly after the refit the Denmark-based DFDS made an offer to buy the Finnjet, but the offer was refused. Instead, in June of the same year Finnlines sold their remaining shares of the Finnjet to Effoa. In the beginning of 1987 the ship was painted in Silja Line's colors and incorporated in Silja's fleet. However, the technical responsibility for operating Finnjet remained with Finnlines until May 1989 (this was of little consequence as Finnlines was almost entirely owned by Effoa at the time).

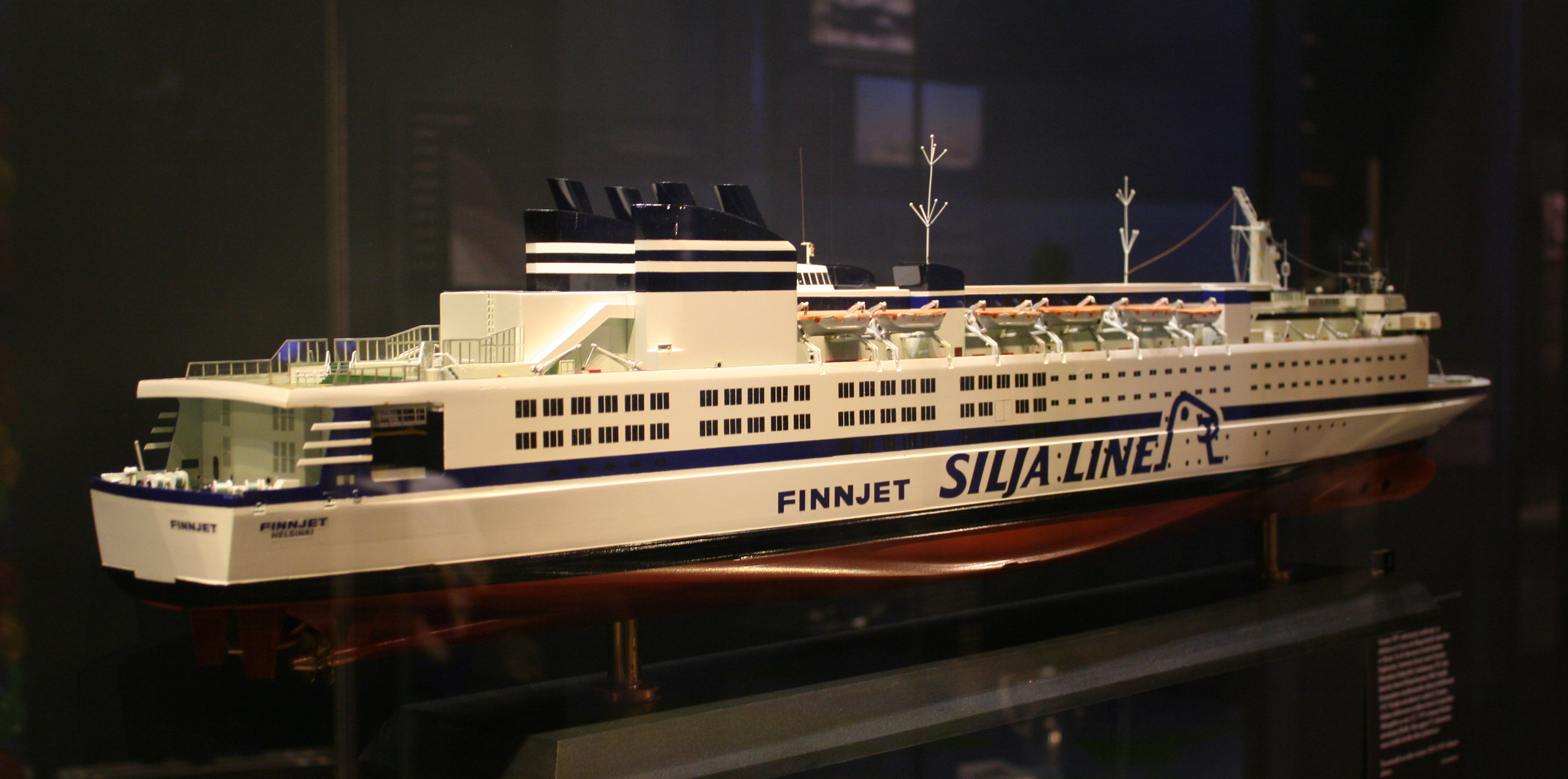
A model of the Finnjet in the Effoa/Silja Line livery she carried 1987–1990

=== 1987–2005 ===
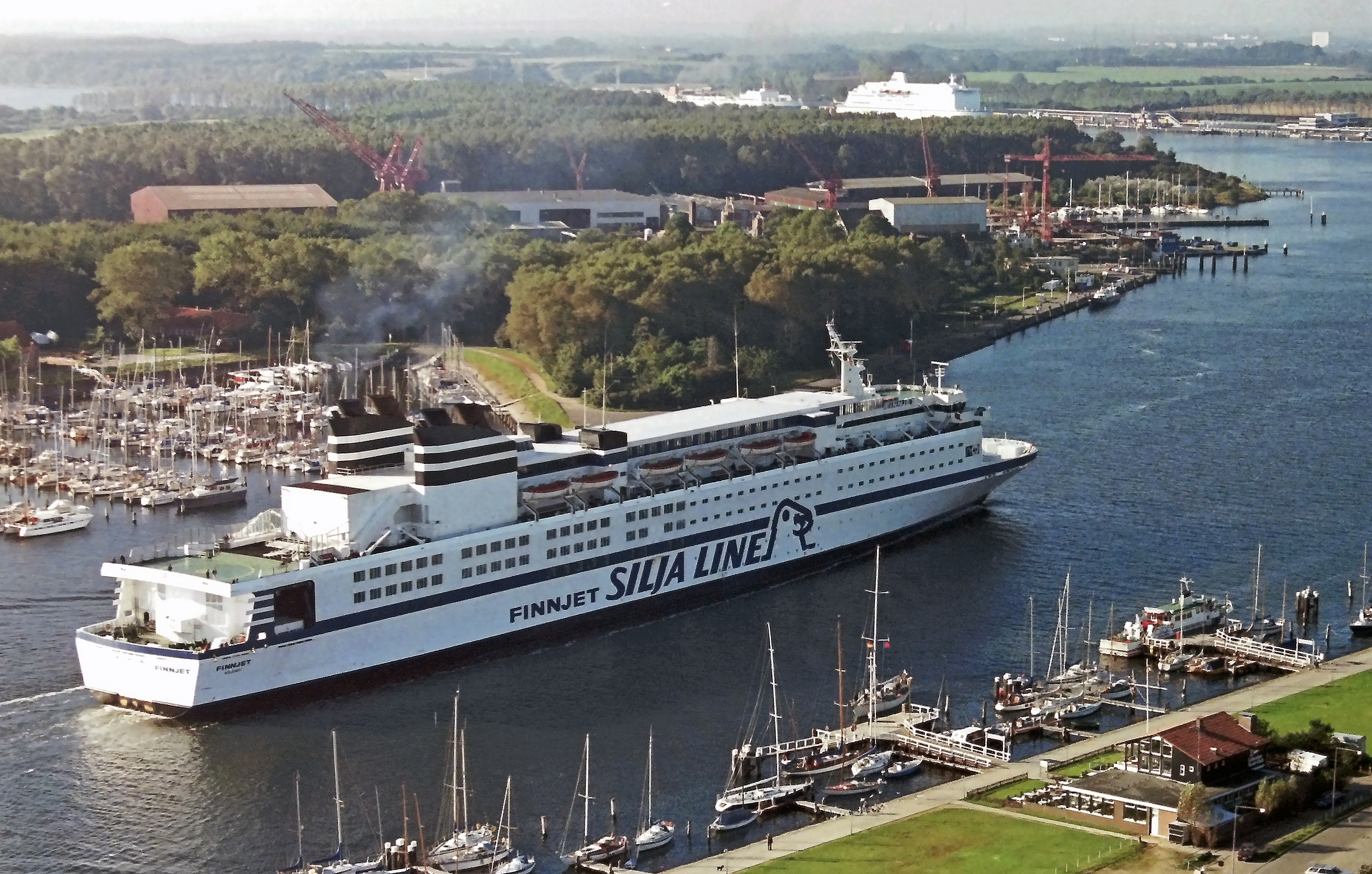
Finnjet at Travemünde in 1987

GTS Finnjet passing through the Kustaanmiekka strait near Helsinki

After the ship had become a part of the Silja Line fleet, further renovations at Howaldtswerke-Deutsche Werft Kiel (HDW) in 1987, 1988 and 1989 saw almost all of the ship's public spaces rebuilt. In 1990 Effoa merged with its fellow Silja Line partner Johnson Line to form EffJohn. In 1991 an extremely large-scale reconstruction was planned, where the ship would have been lengthened by 20 metres (66 ft), cabins enlarged, a new outdoor swimming pool added, and much of the superstructure built to a sleeker appearance. Unfortunately the plan proved to be too costly and was abandoned; the funds that had been raised for this reconstruction went to the rebuilding of Svea and Wellamo into Silja Karneval and Silja Festival.

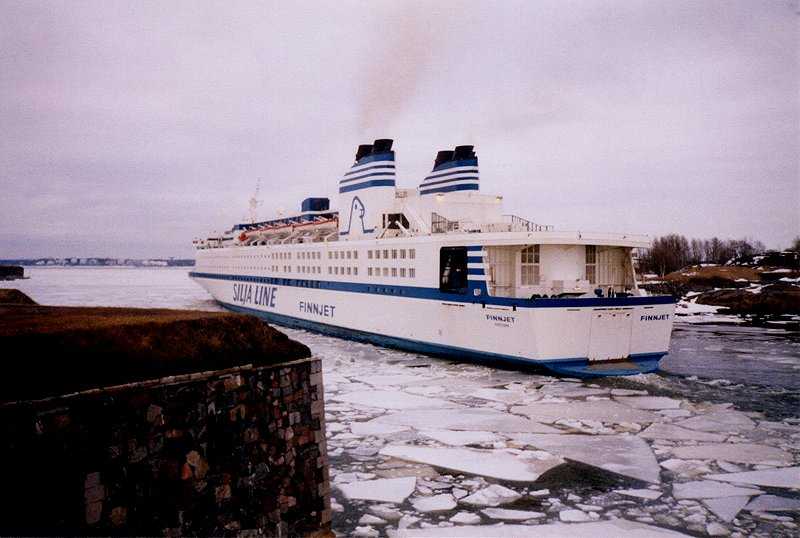
Finnjet at Helsinki in spring 2004

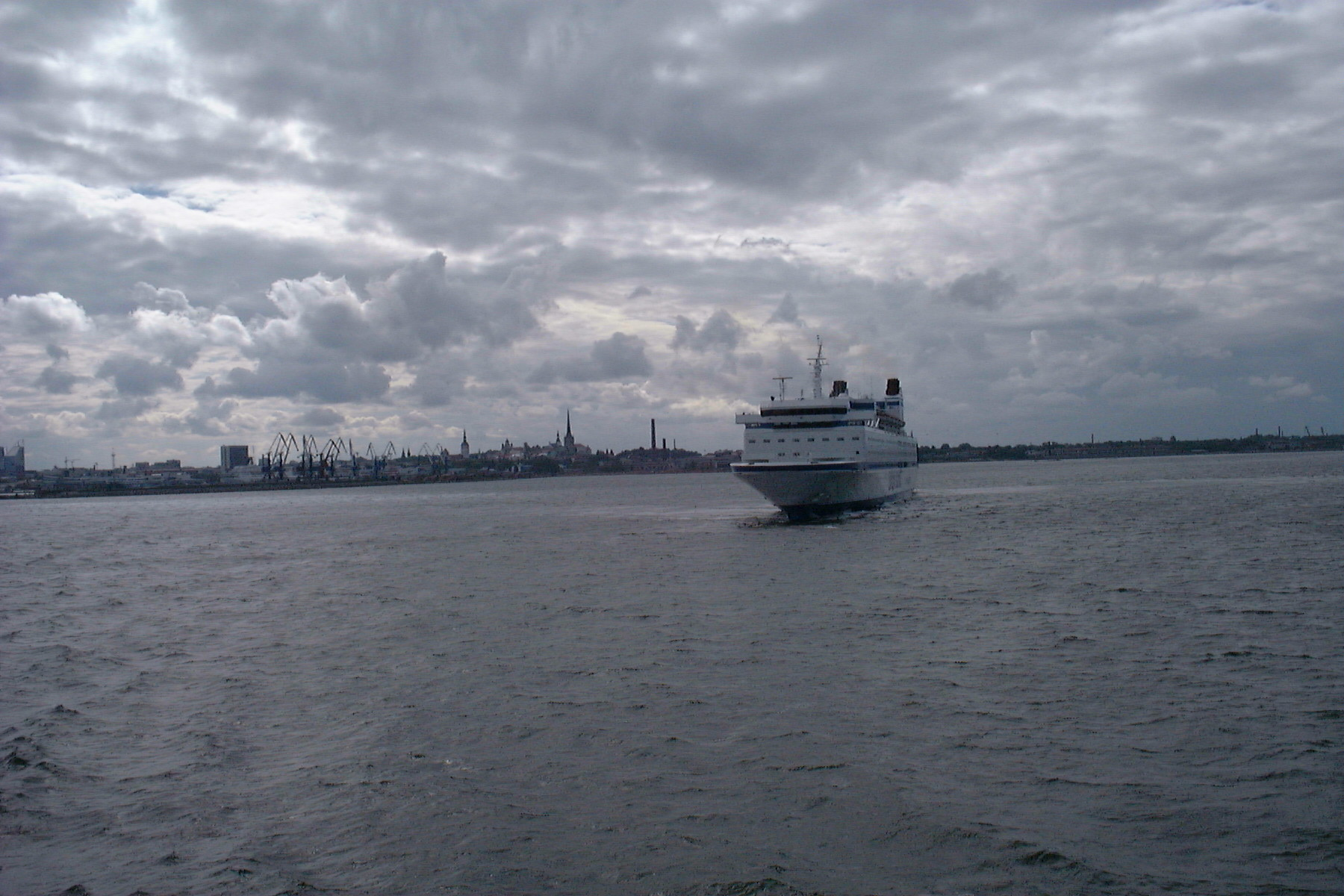
Finnjet between Helsinki and Tallinn on August 28, 1998

Starting from 1992 Finnjet was used to monitor surface-layer chlorophyll, temperature and salinity in waters she sailed through for research by the Finnish Institute of Marine Research. A new transmission system installed in 1994 (again at HDW Kiel) raised the top speed to 33 knots (61 km/h) and allowed for a mixed operation of turbines and diesel engines. September of the same year MS Estonia, Finnjet's former fleetmate, sank during a heavy storm on the North Baltic. Finnjet was amongst the ferries used to search for survivors on the disaster area but she had to leave soon when cars carried on her upper cardeck started moving in the heavy seas, creating another potentially dangerous situation. In 1997 Finnjet was docked at Götaverken Cityvarvet, Gothenburg and rebuilt with a larger tax-free shop in preparation for her new itineraries where she served on the Helsinki–Travemünde route only during the summer months, the rest of the year sailing on the Helsinki–Tallinn route. Originally the port in Tallinn was Muuga, but when the ship-way of Tallinn's old harbour was reconstructed in 1998, Finnjet moved there from the start of January 1999. Between 1997 and 2000 segments for the Finnish comedy series Huuliveikot were shot on board Finnjet.

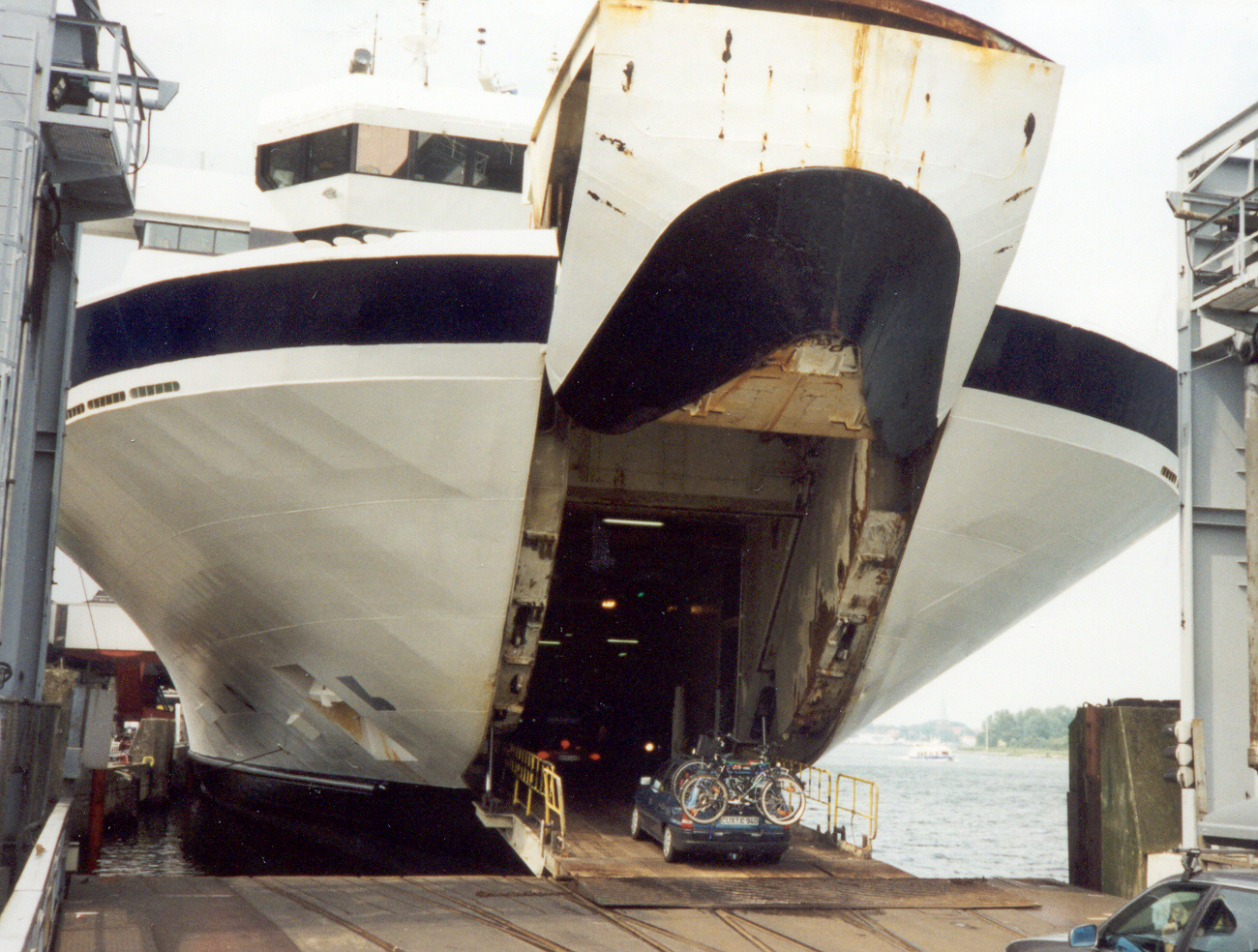
Finnjet's bow

In 1999 the summer-route was altered to Helsinki–Tallinn–Rostock. In autumn of the same year the Finnish Institute of Marine Research installed new equipment for monitoring water quality and algae. In 2001 the ship was docked with modifications made to the turbines and propeller shaft. These and a new bottom paint allowed her to increase her top speed once more, to 33.5 knots (62.0 km/h; 38.6 mph). In mid-May 2002, only a few days after Finnjet's 25th anniversary cruise, Finnish newspaper Helsingin Sanomat reported the ship was for sale. At the time the information was thought to be false but later reports indicate the Finland-based Eckerö Line did consider buying her around that time. In April 2004, Finnjet called in to Helsinki for the last time, after which she left for another refit at Aker Finnyards Rauma shipyard in preparation for her new Saint Petersburg – Tallinn–Rostock route. During the refit most of her interiors were entirely rebuilt, new rudders were installed and bridge wings covered. The new route was believed to be profitable all year round, but this proved not to be the case. After the first summer season Finnjet was laid up for the winter 2004–2005. The route was eventually terminated after the 2005 summer season, and the ship was put up for sale.

=== 2005–2008 ===
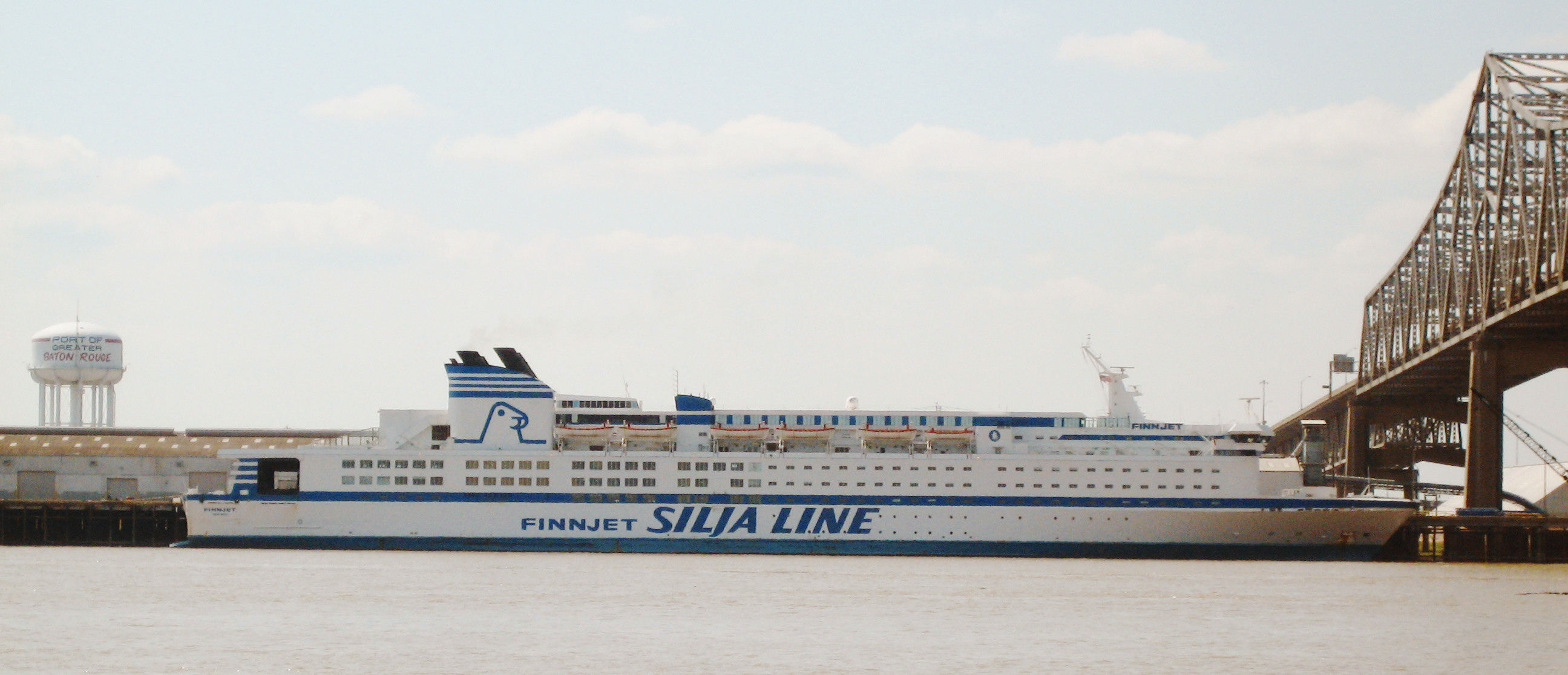
GTS Finnjet when she was housing for the students, faculty, and staff of the Louisiana State University's Health Sciences Center

During the winter of 2005–2006, Finnjet was chartered to the faculty of medicine of Louisiana State University Health Sciences Center New Orleans as a dormitory ship to provide housing to students, faculty, and staff displaced by Hurricane Katrina. She was moored on the west bank of the Mississippi River across from Baton Rouge, at the base of the Horace Wilkinson Bridge during relief efforts.

On 6 June 2006, at the end of her charter, Finnjet left Baton Rouge for Freeport, in the Bahamas. At the same time her ownership passed from Silja Line to their (then-)parent company Sea Containers. The ship had all Silja Line markings painted over and was reflagged from Finnish to Bahamian registry. During the following months, several rumours surfaced about the future use of the ship. These included a sale to a Florida-based company as a casino-ship, a sale to Moby Lines, a charter or sale to the St. Kitts and Nevis-based cruise company Royal Zante Cruises, and a charter to Venezuela-based company for two years from June 2007 onwards. On 28 October 2007 Finnjetweb.com reported that Finnjet was to be sold to a Bahama-based, US-controlled company that planned to rebuild her into the world's largest, most luxurious casino-cruise ship, capable of catering for some 3100 guests; plans for the reconstruction were reportedly to be drawn by the Finnish Deltamarin.

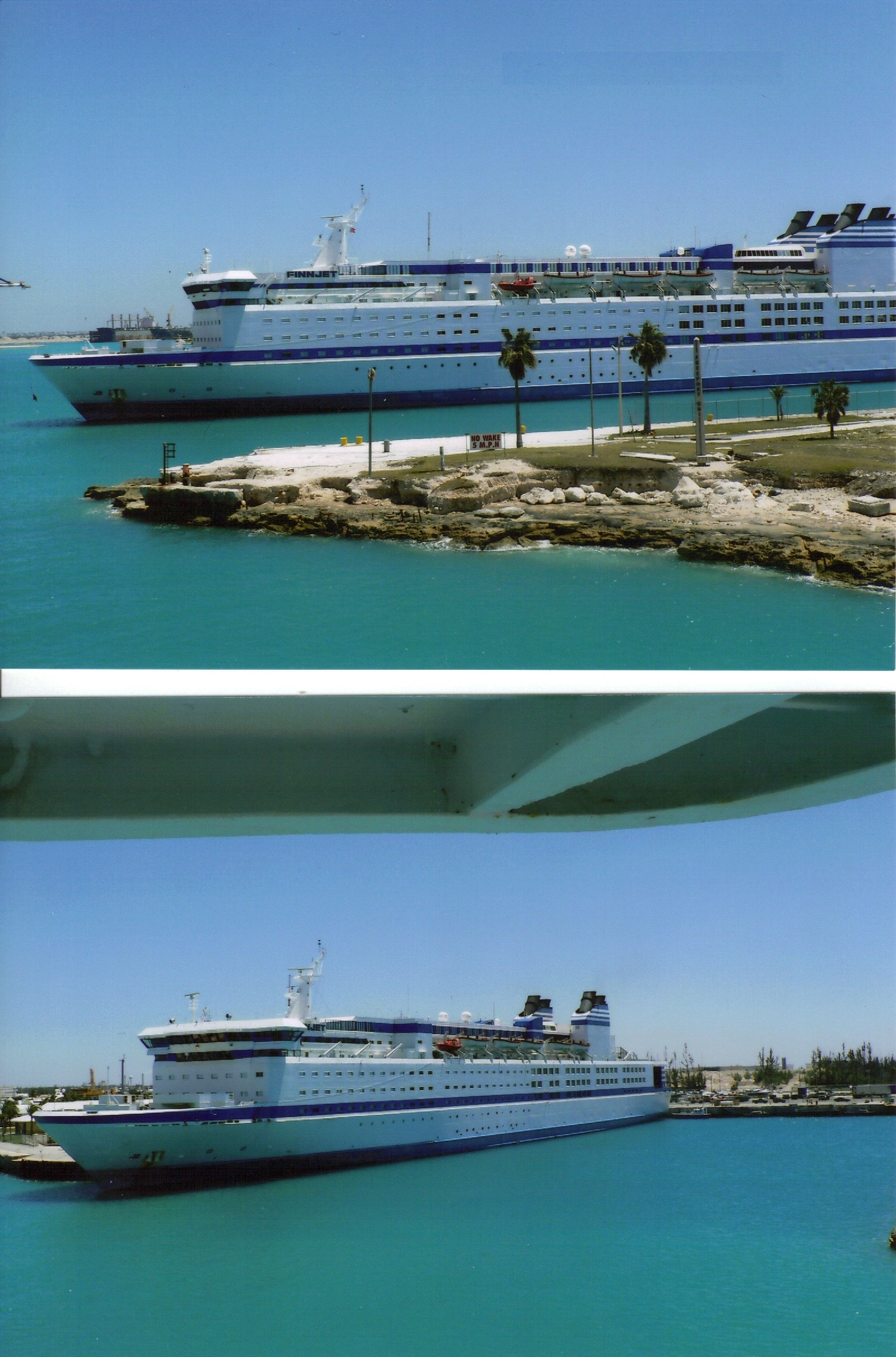
Finnjet laid up at Freeport, The Bahamas, March 2007

On 21 November 2007 the ship was sold to Cruise Ship Holdings Four, a daughter company of the Netherlands-based Club Cruise. On 16 January 2008 she was officially renamed Da Vinci, and sailed to the T. Mariotti shipyard in Genoa, where she was to be rebuilt into a cruise ship. However, it turned out that the price of the conversion was much higher than anticipated, and as a result Da Vinci was sold for scrap in May 2008 at a price of approximately $9.85 million (€6.5 million). On 6 May 2008 she left Genoa for Jeddah in Saudi Arabia, where she was turned over to her new owners in mid-May. The ship was then renamed MV Kingdom.

== Rescue efforts and recycling 2008–2009 ==
During May 2008 Finnjet's chief designer Martin Saarikangas led an effort to purchase Finnjet as a housing vessel for the Finnish cities Espoo or Turku. After these plans were deemed unfeasible, further efforts took place to find a new operator for Finnjet. The ship's original builder in Helsinki offered assistance in reconditioning or converting the vessel to a new buyer's required standards. A potential Nordic buyer for the vessel was turned away when a Finnish entrepreneur foiled the work of Saarikangas. "Finnjet is lost", Martin Saarikangas declared and withdrew.

The ship arrived at the scrapyard in Alang, India on Friday, 13 June 2008. On Thursday, 19 June the ship was beached at Plot 109 of the Alang scrapyard. Although partially beached, scrapping did not start immediately, when an international lobby group initiated by former Finnjet passenger Risto Kempas managed to negotiate a halt into the breaking at the Rishi Ship Breaker's facility. The fine overall condition of the vessel had impressed the breaker into considering of the ship having more value if returned to traffic. Several parties then searched for potential buyers and the work culminated into a Finnish ship operator sending a three-man team to inspect Finnjet during the August of that year. The team discovered only loose items such as mattresses, fridges, television sets and furniture had been removed from the ship, along with some consoles in accordance to Indian laws. However, the damp Indian climate had encrusted Finnjet completely with mold in just three months. She had become unsalvageable for the potential buyers and full breaking was initiated on 12 September 2008.

In spring of 2009, the breaker went on record for the Finnish newspaper Helsingin Sanomat of the breaking being more expensive than the scrapping value. Finnjet's thick steel (Rautaruukki NVA-36) ice-strengthened hull with double bottom, excessively strong bulkheads and reinforced fire-proofed compartments turned out to be a nightmare for the breaker. In September 2009 the remains of Finnjet still stood on plot 109.

== Legacy ==
The license and trademark to the name Finnjet continue to reside with Finnlines Oyj/Plc, with a shared non-commercial license issued to Finnjet Historical Society ry. The society holds the official documentation, operator's archive and complete sets of building plans to realized or planned-only Finnjet conversions. Several lead designers, ship builders, captains, chief engineers and crew have joined the society during 2009.

== Decks ==
Public spaces have been named as they were when the ship was last in active service for Silja Line in 2005. On Finnjet, only decks to which passengers had access are numbered, the main engine room is below deck 1.

1. Silja Spa, swimming pool
2. Crew cabins, cardeck
3. Crew cabins, driver's club, cardeck
4. Seaside- and Tourist I-S-class cabins, information desk, Buffét Silja, galley, crew mess, crew dayroom, boarding
5. Seaside- and Tourist I-S-class cabins, cinema, Chef's Dining, El Capitán and Maxim á la Carte -restaurants, sea shop, perfume shop
6. Seaside- and Tourist I-S-class cabins, Siljaland children's playroom, hairdresser, Navigator's Pub, Seaside Café, Ocean Club nightclub, boarding
7. "Air seats", crew accommodations, sundeck
8. Bridge, crew accommodations, officer's mess, hospital
9. Commodore-class cabins, Stardust Bar, crew's sundeck
10. Stardust cabinet

== Record and firsts ==
During her career the Finnjet held numerous records, including the following:

- Largest ferry in the world in terms of gross register tonnage, number of passengers carried and number of passenger berths (1977–1981).
- Longest ferry in the world (1977–2001).
- Fastest conventional ferry in the world (1999–2009). Finnjet's speed record of 33 knots (61 km/h; 38 mph) remains unbroken as of February 2009.
- First and only gas turbine powered ferry in the world (1977–1996).
- First ferry in the world with a Lego model of it commercially available (1977).
- Only civilian ship in the world with a CODLAG-propulsion system (1994–2000).
- First civilian ship in the world with Electronic Chart Display and Information System (1994).

Preceded by MS Napoléon	World's Largest Cruiseferry; 1977–1981	Succeeded by MS Finlandia
