= Club Cruise =

Netherlands-based cruise ship company

Club Cruise was a Netherlands-based cruise ship company, that chartered vessels to other operators, including Transocean Tours and Phoenix Reisen. The company had also operated ships under its own brands, first in 1999 on short cruises from the Netherlands and during 2008 in the United Kingdom cruise market under the banner of Van Gogh Cruises.

Club Cruise was reportedly seeking to list itself in the London Stock Exchange.

== History ==
Club Cruise was founded in 1999 to operate short cruises out of Rotterdam with one ship, MS Club 1. The service was not a success, and the company ceased operations after the 1999 Northern Hemisphere summer season. Subsequently, the Club 1 was renamed MS Van Gogh and chartered to the France-based Nouvelles Frontieres. In 2002 the ship was chartered to the United Kingdom–based Travelscope. Two additional ships were acquired in 2006. MS Albatros was purchased from a Bahamas-based company and continued under charter to her previous operator, the Germany-based Phoenix Reisen. MS Walrus was purchased from SeaContainers. She was renamed MS Jules Verne and chartered to the Spain-based Vision Cruises. In 2008 she was renamed MS Alexander von Humboldt II and also chartered to Phoenix Reisen.

In 2007, Club Cruise acquired MS Astoria from Sovcomflot. Sovcomflot had chartered her to the Germany-based Transocean Tours, and Club Cruise continued this charter. During the same year Club Cruise were reported to be planning an ambitious new building programme of six 20,000 GT ships. In early 2008 the company were reportedly negotiating with a South Korean shipyard about ordering three 20,000 GT ships. In late 2007, Club Cruise purchased the cruiseferry GTS Finnjet from SeaContainers. She was renamed GTS Da Vinci with plans to convert her to a cruise ship, but due to higher-than-anticipated costs of the conversion the plan was abandoned and the ship was sold for scrap in May 2008. Around the same time it was reported that Club Cruise were experiencing financial difficulties and as a result were looking to sell the Astoria. This was realised in June 2008, when the Astoria was sold to Saga Cruises, with delivery in April 2009, following the end of her charter to Transocean Tours.

=== Van Gogh Cruises ===
Van Gogh Cruises was established in January 2008, following the collapse of Travelscope who had previously chartered MS Van Gogh from Club Cruise. Due to the popularity of the ship in the UK cruise market, Club Cruise decided to establish a new subsidiary to operate her, staffed mostly by ex-Travelscope employees. Van Gogh Cruises was planned to tale over most of the existing 2008 and 2009 itineraries Travelscope had planned for the Van Gogh. Due to difficulties in acquiring membership of the Association of British Travel Agents, the company were unable to sell any cruises. Due to this the company have chartered the Van Gogh to the Russia-based Metropolis Tur for the 2008 Northern Hemisphere summer season. Originally Van Gogh Cruises planned to restart operations in 2009 after ABTA membership had been acquired, but the company has ceased operations.

== Fleet ==
=== Ships chartered out ===
- MS Albatros
- 2006 - 2008
- under charter to Phoenix Reisen.
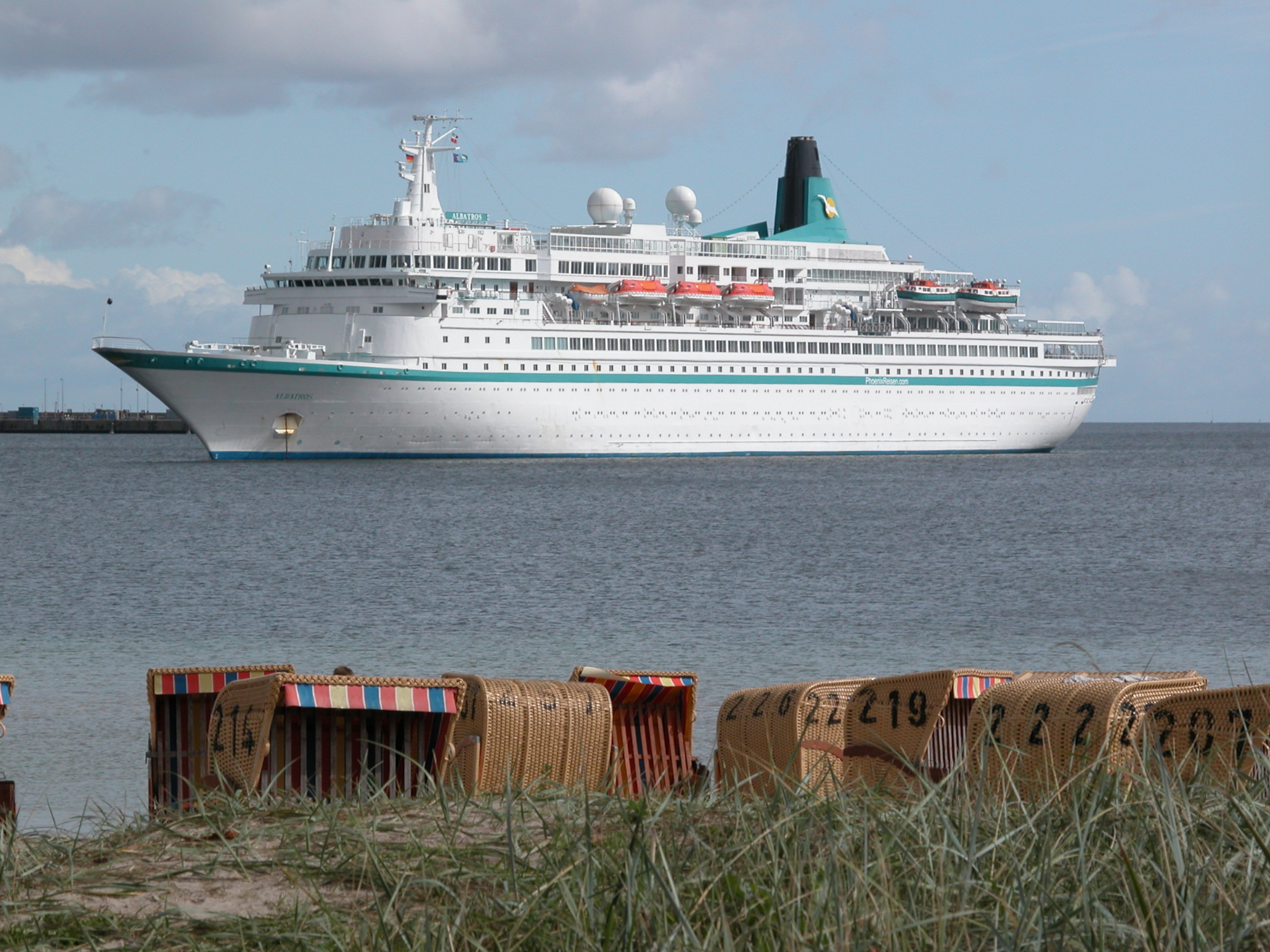
- MS Alexander von Humboldt II
- 2008
- under charter to Phoenix Reisen.
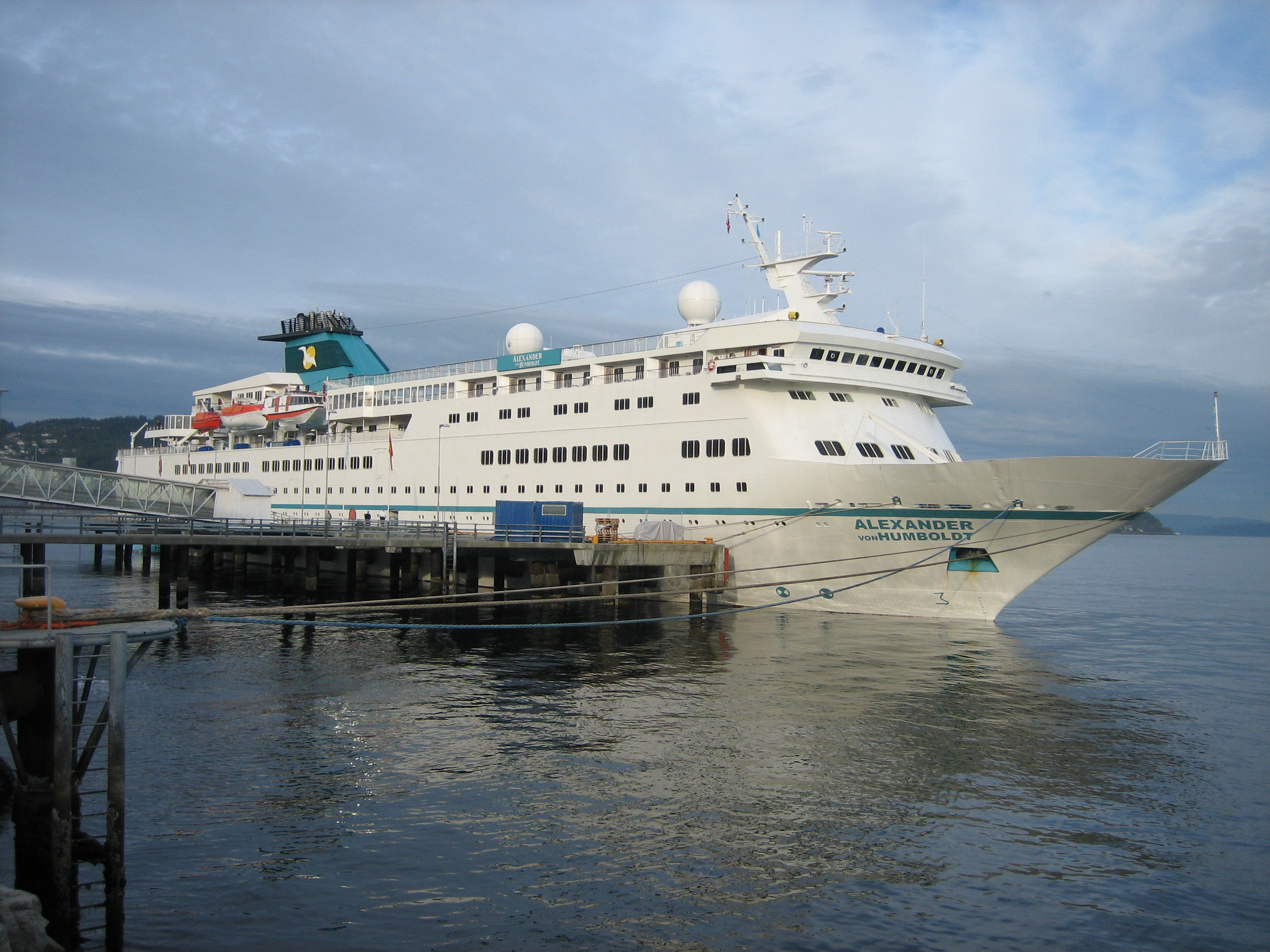
- MS Astoria
- 2007 - 2009
- under charter to Transocean Tours until April 2009. Following the end of the charter she will be sold to Saga Cruises.
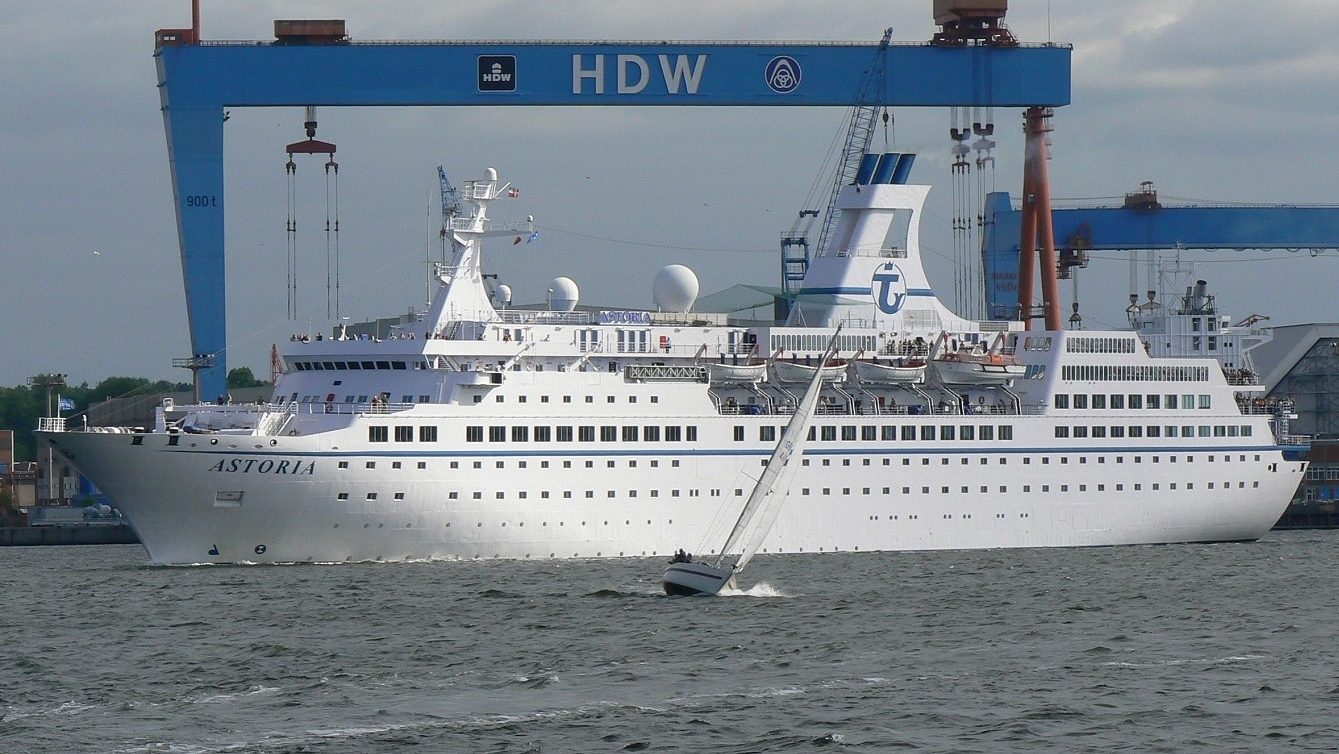
- MS Club 1 / Van Gogh
- 1999 - 2008
- under charter to Metropolis Tur for the 2008 Northern Hemisphere summer season.
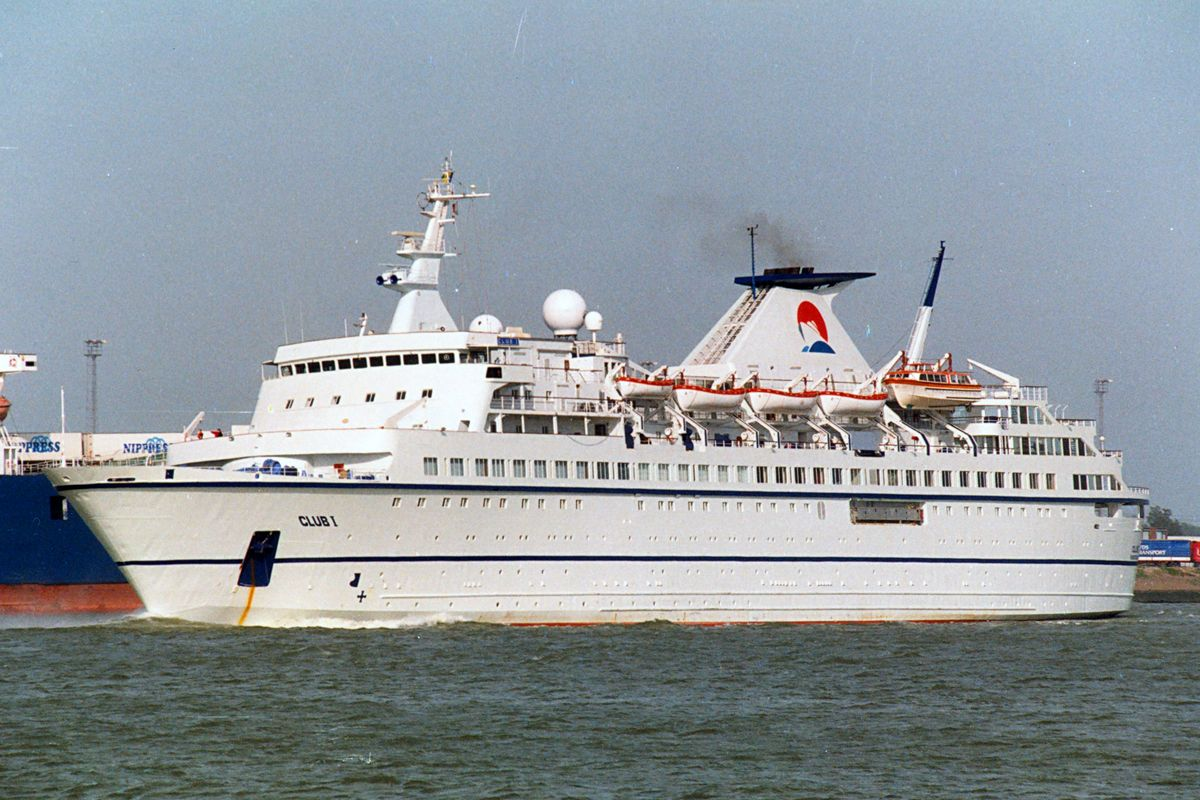
  M.S Van Gogh as Club 1.

=== Former ships ===
- GTS Da Vinci (2007–2008) – Originally the cruiseferry Finnjet. Purchased by Club Cruise to be rebuilt into a cruise ship, November 2007, but sold for scrap in May 2008.
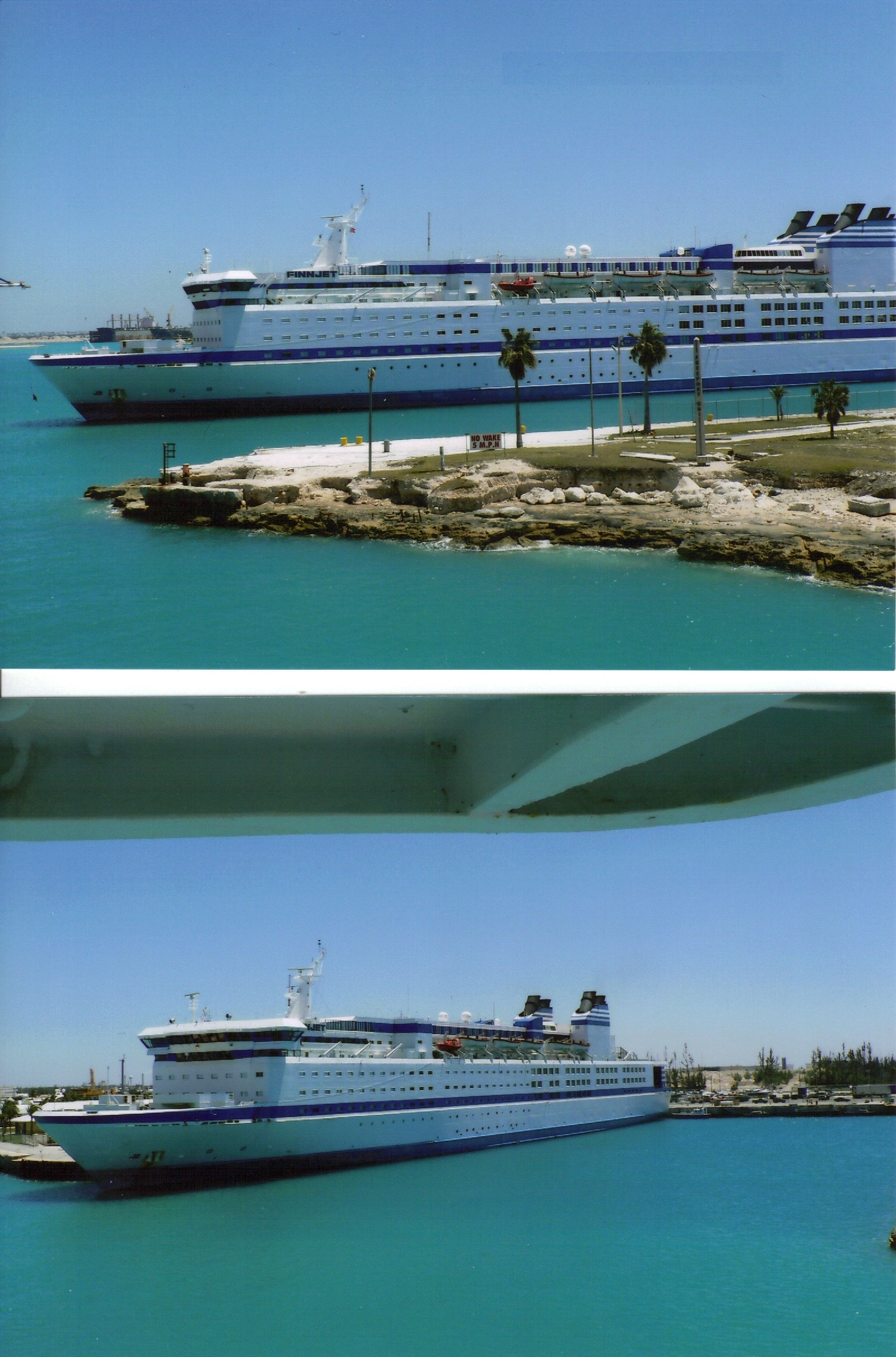
  The (G.T.S) Finnjet as Da Vinci laid up, 2008
