= Joseph Rosendo =

American journalist and television personality

- Born: Joseph Ramon Rosendo; September 20, 1946 (age 79); Miami, Florida, U.S.
- Education: UCLA
- Occupations: Travel Journalist, TV Personality
- Website: www.travelscope.net

Joseph Ramon Rosendo (born September 20, 1946) is an American travel journalist, broadcaster, television personality and public speaker. Since 2007 he has been the executive producer, host, director and writer of the American Public Television series Joseph Rosendo’s Travelscope which has aired on PBS and Public Television Stations in the United States and Canada with 117 episodes in distribution. Season 10 was released in the spring of 2018, and Season 11 followed in August 2019.

Joseph Rosendo’s Travelscope has won 42 Telly awards, been nominated for 18 National Daytime Emmy Awards and won six, including 2 personal Emmys for Outstanding Directing in a Lifestyle/Culinary/Travel Program category and 2 Emmys for his role as host.

== Career ==
Rosendo published his first travel story in the Los Angeles Times in 1980 and since then has been published in national and regional publications. In addition, he has authored a selection of books and acted as consultant editor on others including Where To Go When and Where To Go When – The Americas for D.K. Eyewitness Travel Guides, a guide to Los Angeles during the 1984 Olympics and a book of short stories entitled, MUSINGS — The Short Happy Pursuit of Pleasure and other Journeys.

Rosendo also hosted Travelscope – a national travel radio show from 1985 until 2009, creating more than a thousand original hour-long shows. In addition to his radio show he produced radio features for, among others, ABC News, Discovery Channel Radio and the Associated Press.

Rosendo, presented at the New York Times Travel Show, LifeWorks Erie Expo in Erie, Pennsylvania and the benefit for Books That Build Bridges in Kansas City, Missouri where he spoke on Travel As A Life-Changing Experience.

Rosendo’s journalist awards include nine Lowell Thomas Travel Journalism Awards for Video and Audio, the Travel Industry Association of Canada (TIAC) National Award for Tourism Excellence - Globe and Mail Travel Media Award and two Canadian Tourism Commission Northern Lights Broadcast Award. Joseph has also been honored with the Government of France’s Medaille d’Or du Tourisme for his decades of travel journalism on France and his support of France during the run-up to the Iraq War in 2003.

Joseph Rosendo is a member of the Society of American Travel Writers. In addition to his television shows, he also produces travel stories, radio shows, pod casts and a blog covering a wide diversity of travel destinations and lifestyle topics.

In August 2016, Rosendo released a series of archaeological documentaries titled "Digging into the Future" which present archaeological expeditions to a number of countries - Armenia, Peruvian south coast, Albania, Tunisia and others.

== Personal life ==
Rosendo lives in Topanga, California. Rosendo is the past president of the Topanga Chamber of Commerce and is active in community affairs in the Topanga area, such as the effort to stop the spraying of herbicides by Caltrans along Topanga Canyon Boulevard. He was married to Julie Rosendo since 1987. In December 2021, Joseph filed for divorce. The couple share two children.
