= List of unclassified miscellaneous vessels of the United States Navy =

Ships of the United States Navy

Ships in current service
- Current ships

Ships grouped alphabetically
- A–B; C; D–F; G–H; I–K; L; M; N–O; P; Q–R; S; T–V; W–Z

Ships grouped by type
- Aircraft carriers; Airships; Amphibious warfare ships; Auxiliaries; Battlecruisers; Battleships; Cruisers; Destroyers; Destroyer escorts; Destroyer leaders; Escort carriers; Frigates; Hospital ships; Littoral combat ships; Mine warfare vessels; Monitors; Oilers; Patrol vessels; Registered civilian vessels; Sailing frigates; Steam frigates; Steam gunboats; Ships of the line; Sloops of war; Submarines; Torpedo boats; Torpedo retrievers; Unclassified miscellaneous; Yard and district craft

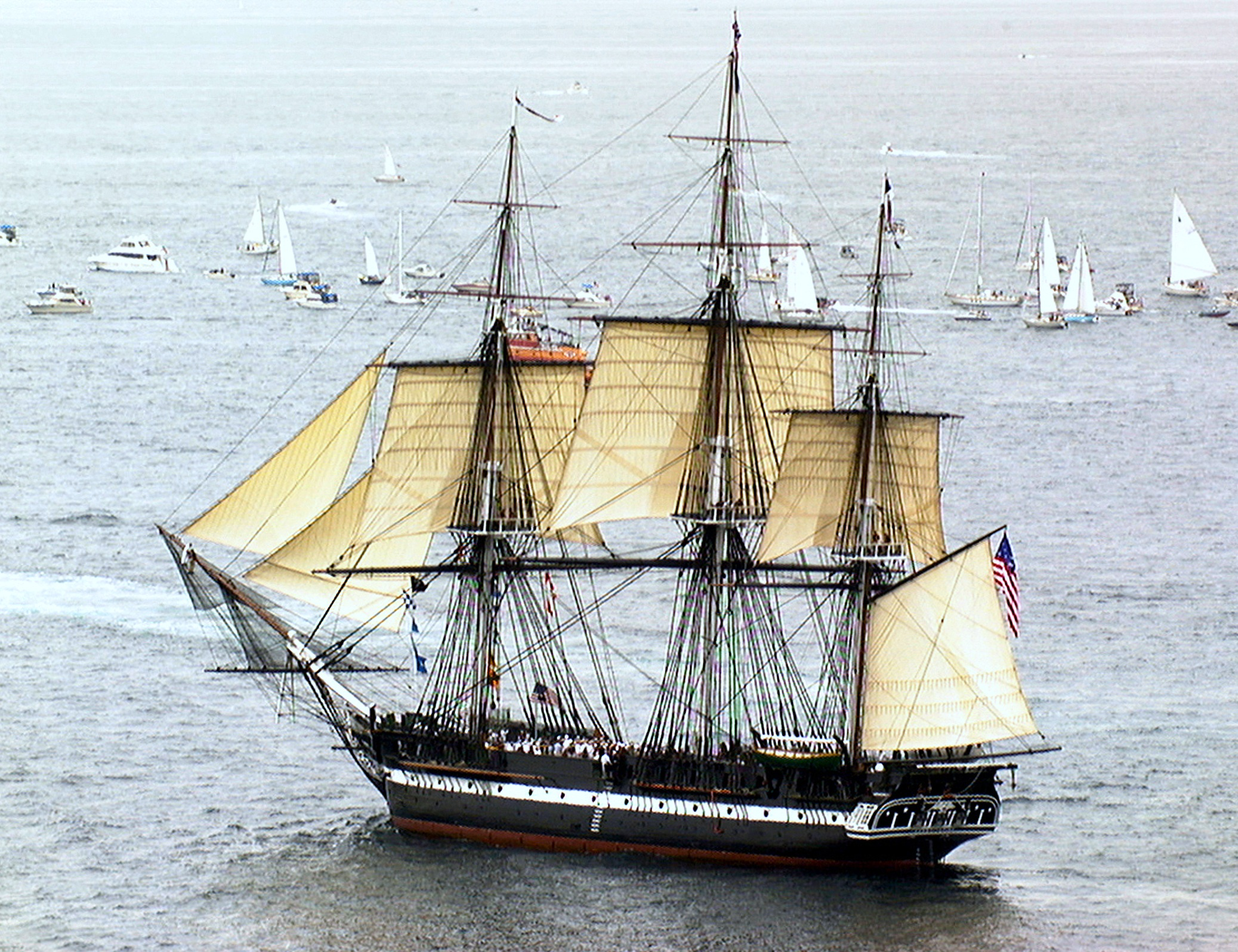
USS Constitution in 1997, formerly (IX-21) from 1941 to 1975

The IX (unclassified–miscellaneous) hull classification symbol is used for ships of the United States Navy that do not fit into one of the standard categories. Similar lists of 'miscellaneous' ships can found at

List of auxiliaries of the United States Navy § Miscellaneous ships (AG, T-AG)

and

List of yard and district craft of the United States Navy § District auxiliary, miscellaneous (YAG).

Ship status is indicated as either currently active [A] (including ready reserve), inactive [I], or precommissioning [P]. Ships in the inactive category include only ships in the inactive reserve, ships which have been disposed from US service have no listed status. Ships in the precommissioning category include ships under construction or on order; IX ships are generally not ordered as such, but are rather converted from other roles.

== Historical overview ==
These vessels usually fall into these categories:

- Armed decoys (Q-ships)
- Experimental vessels
- Former yachts
- Mobile base vessels used by service squadrons (command ships, barracks ships, bulk storage ships including tankers, unnamed barges, and floating shipyard equipment)
- Retired warships
- Training equipment and simulators (including two Great Lakes-based paddlewheel aircraft carriers)
- War prizes

As of 2026 only one ship, USS Prevail (IX-537), actively carries an IX hull symbol.

=== World War II ===
See also

List of United States Navy amphibious warfare ships § World War II
List of auxiliaries of the United States Navy § World War II

During the naval build-up for World War II at least 45 vessels of Maritime Commission (MarCom, later MarAd) standard designs were converted to US Navy unclassified miscellaneous vessels (several after suffering heavy damage in commercial service):

- 12 Type EC2 Liberty ships (3 later classed as auxiliaries)
- 20 Type Z-ET1 Liberty ships (2 later classed as auxiliaries)
- 13 Type B7-D1 concrete barges

== Unclassified miscellaneous vessels (IX) ==
- Annapolis (IX-1), ex-PG-10

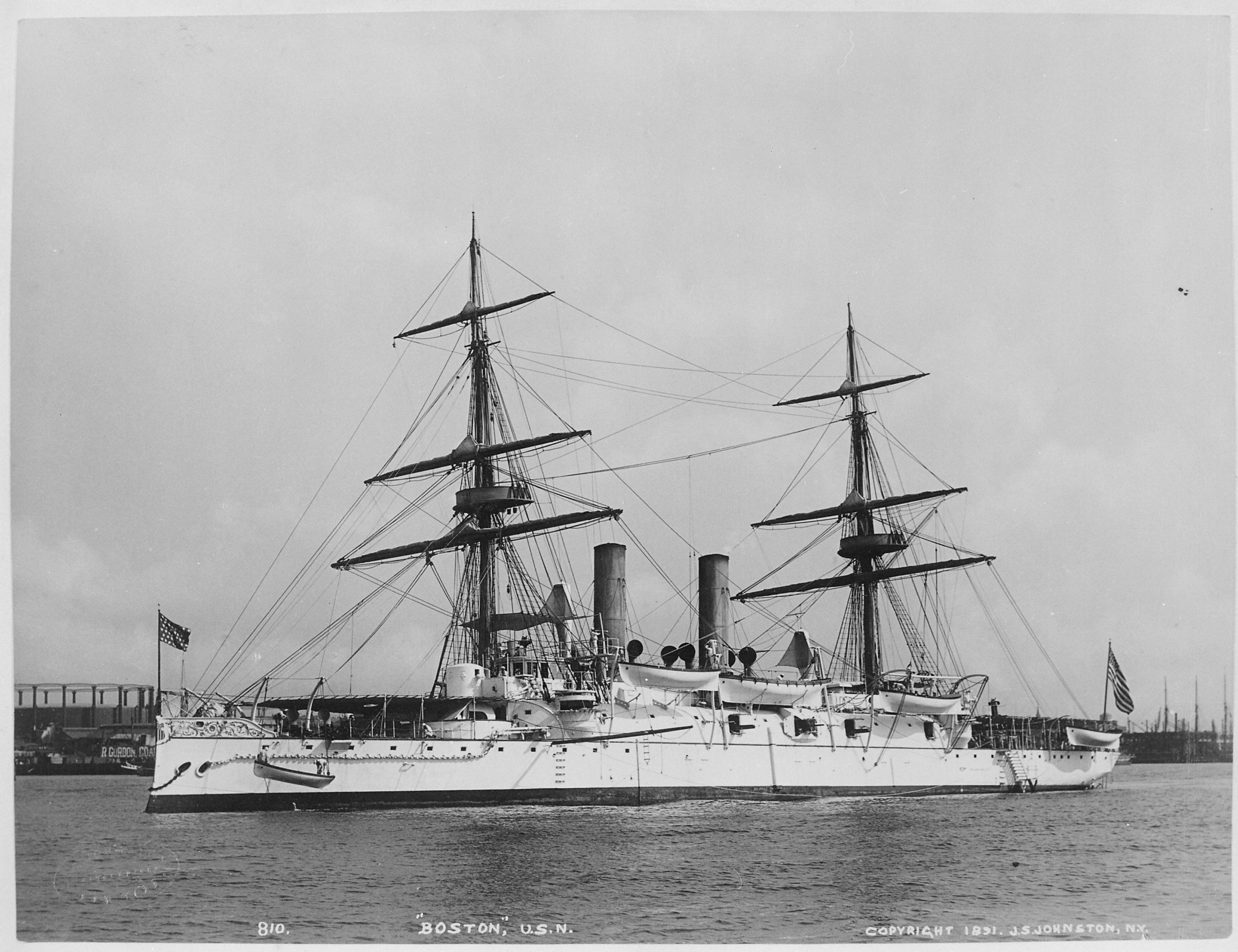
USS Dispatch (IX-2) as Boston

- Dispatch (IX-2), ex-Boston, protected cruiser
- Briarcliff (IX-3), receiving ship
- Cheyenne (IX-4), ex-BM-10
- Alton (IX-5), ex-CA-14, ex-CL-14
- Coastal Battleship Number 4 (IX-6), ex-BB-4
- Commodore (IX-7), receiving ship, armory
- Cumberland (IX-8), receiving ship
- Dubuque (IX-9), ex-AG-6, later PG-17
- Essex (IX-10), ex-sloop of war, receiving ship
- Gopher (IX-11), ex-Fern, training ship, sank while under tow 21 September 1923
- Hancock (IX-12), ex-AP-3, receiving ship

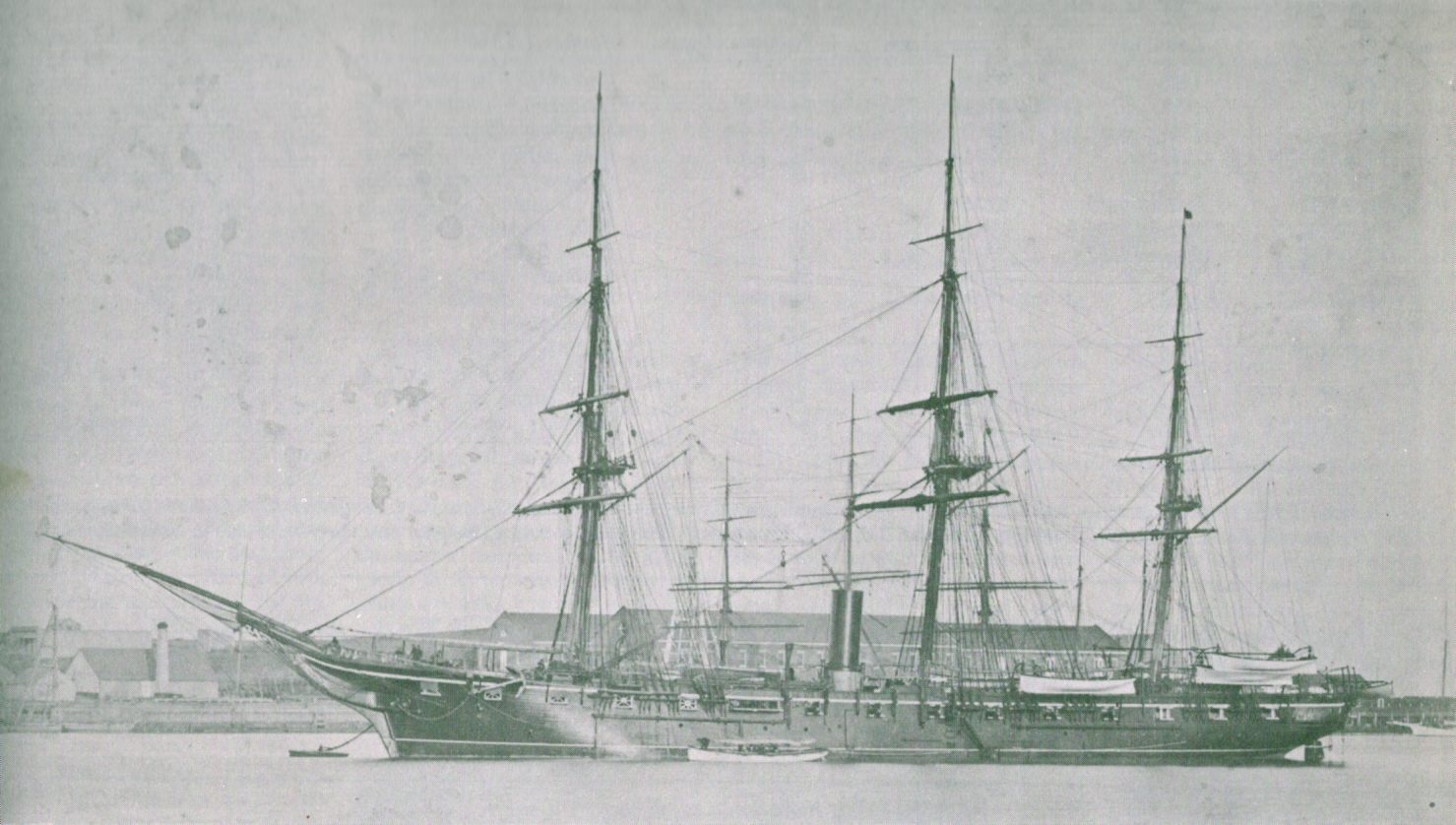
USS Hartford (IX-13)

- Hartford (IX-13), Civil War relic
- Hawk (IX-14), ex-PY-2
- Prairie State (IX-15), ex-BB-7
- Tallahassee (IX-16), ex-BM-9
- Monadnock (IX-17), ex-BM-3
- Nantucket (IX-18), ex-PG-23
- Newport (IX-19), ex-PG-12

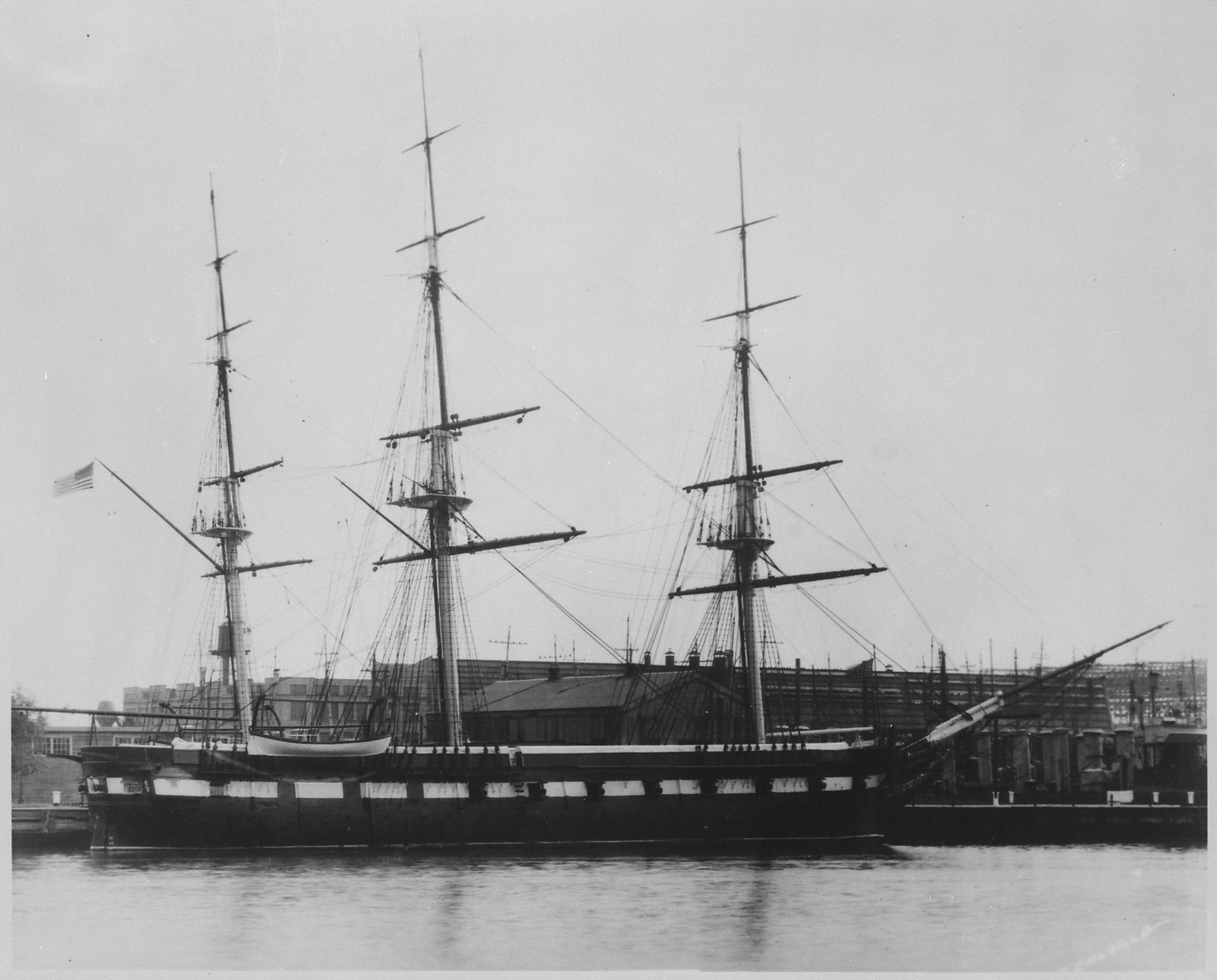
USS Constellation (IX-20)

- Constellation (IX-20), museum ship
- Constitution (IX-21) [A], later 'none' classification as museum ship still in commission
- Oregon (IX-22), ex-BB-3
- Paducah (IX-23), ex-AG-7, later PG-18
- Philadelphia (IX-24), ex-C-4
- Reina Mercedes (IX-25), Spanish-American war prize
- Southery (IX-26)
- Sturgeon Bay (IX-27)
- Wheeling (IX-28), ex-PG-14
- Wilmette (IX-29)
- Dover (IX-30), ex-PG-8
- Wolverine (IX-31), ex-Michigan
- Yantic (IX-32)
- Newton (IX-33), ex-ID-4306
- Henry County (IX-34), later TS Golden State
- Topeka (IX-35), ex-PG-35
- Light Target Number 2 (IX-36), ex-DD-136, later DMS-3, AG-19
- Light Target Number 3 (IX-37), ex-DD-275
- Empire State (IX-38), ex-AG-11
- Seattle (IX-39), ex-CA-11

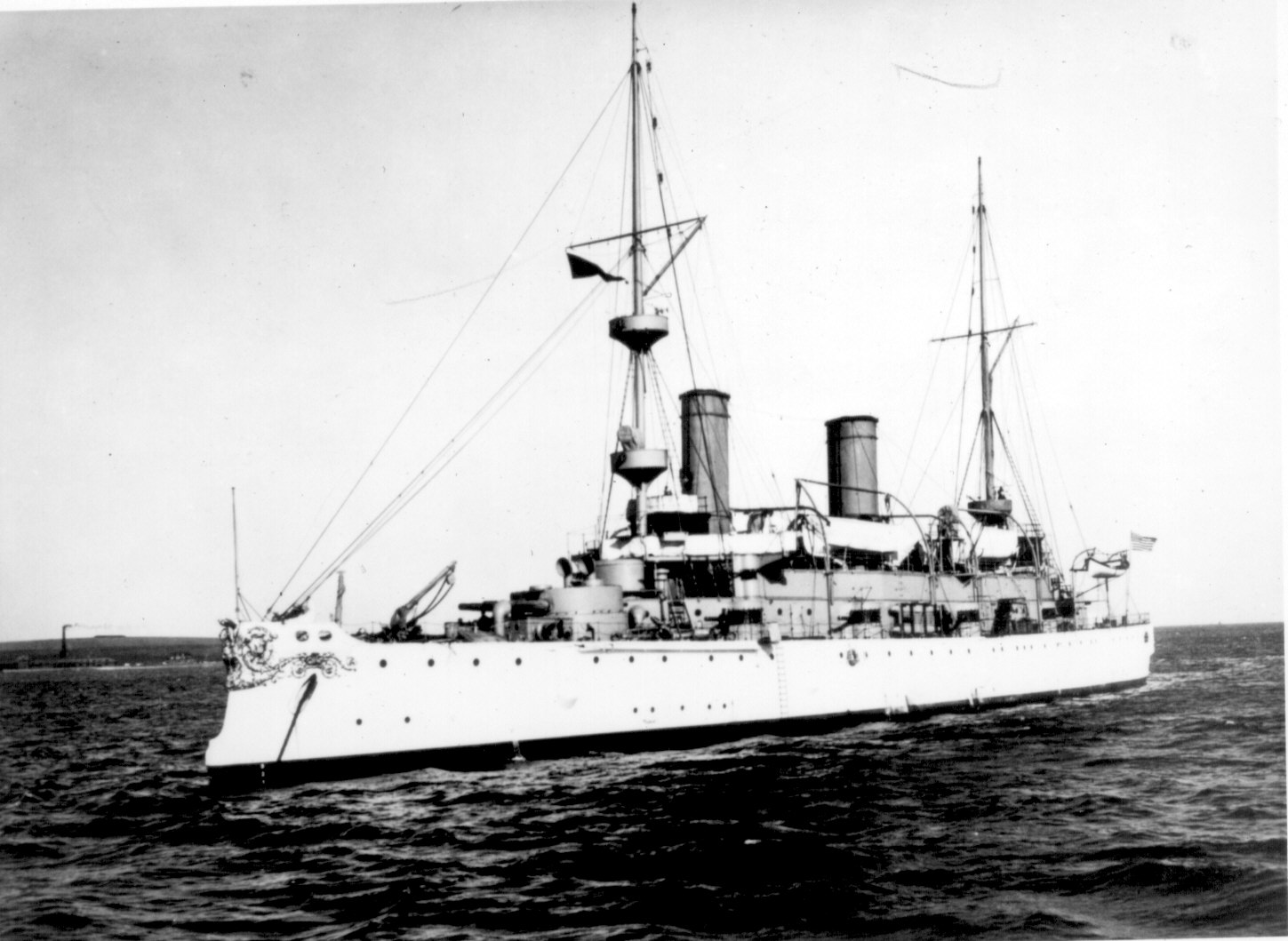
USS Olympia (IX-40) as (C-6)

- Olympia (IX-40), ex-CL-15, later museum ship
- America (IX-41), converted yacht
- Camden (IX-42), ex-AS-6
- Freedom (IX-43), converted yacht
- Damage Control Hulk Number 1 (IX-44), ex-DD-163
- Favorite (IX-45)
- Transfer (IX-46)
- Vamarie (IX-47), converted yacht
- Highland Light (IX-48), converted yacht
- Spindrift (IX-49), converted yacht

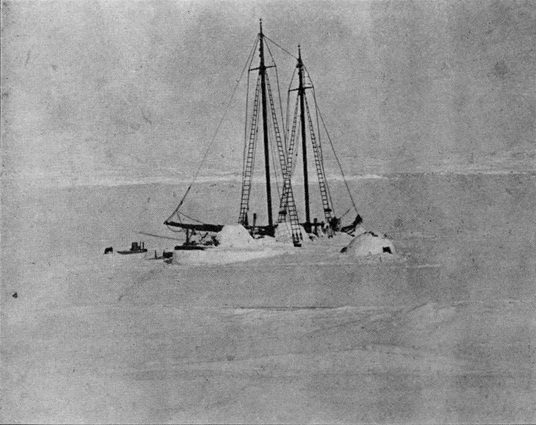
Future USS Bowdoin (IX-50) frozen in Arctic ice with igloo habitats (1923)

- Bowdoin (IX-50), converted yacht, former Arctic research vessel
- Sea Otter I (IX-51)
- Cheng Ho (IX-52), converted yacht
- Sea Otter II (IX-53)
- Galaxy (IX-54)

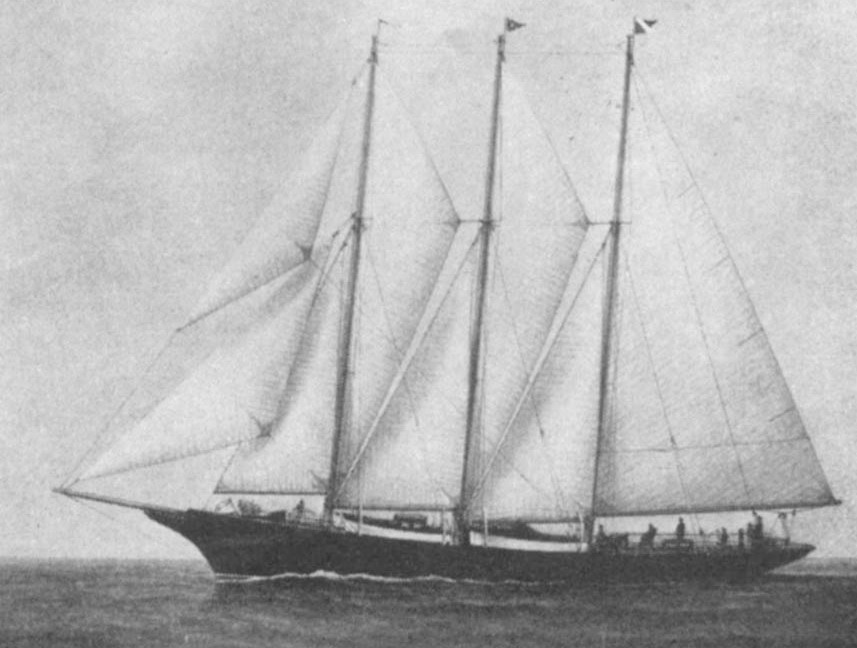
USS Black Douglas (IX-55)

- Black Douglas (IX-55), ex-PYc-45, later royal yacht of Morocco
- Navajo (IX-56), ex-AT-52
- Araner (IX-57), converted yacht
- Dwyn Wen (IX-58), converted yacht
- Volador (IX-59), converted yacht
- Seaward (IX-60), converted yacht
- Geoanna (IX-61), converted yacht, later US Army TP-249
- Vileehi (IX-62), converted yacht
- Zahma (IX-63), converted yacht

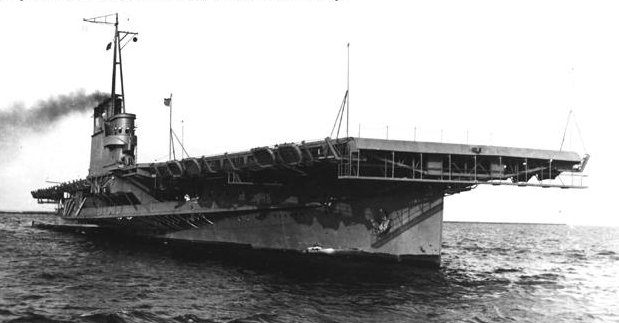
USS Wolverine (IX-64)

- Wolverine (IX-64), ex-SS Seeandbee, Great Lakes Aircraft Training Carrier (CV)
- Blue Dolphin (IX-65), converted yacht
- Migrant (IX-66), converted yacht
- Guinevere (IX-67), converted yacht (note duplicated number)
- Burleson (IX-67), training ship, ex-APA-67 (note duplicated number)
- Seven Seas (IX-68), converted yacht
- Puritan (IX-69), converted yacht
- Gloria Dalton (IX-70), converted yacht

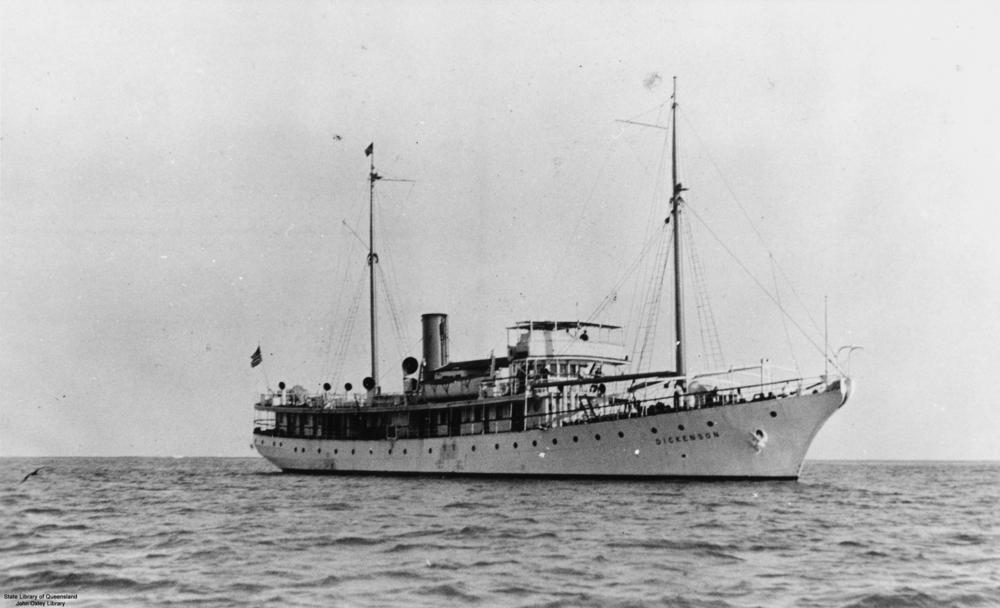
USS Kailua (IX-71) as Dickenson

- Kailua (IX-71), ex-CS Dickenson (cable ship)
- Liberty Belle (IX-72)
- Zaca (IX-73), converted yacht
- Metha Nelson (IX-74), converted yacht
- John M. Howard (IX-75), ex-Elsie Fenimore converted yacht
- Ramona (IX-76), converted yacht
- Juniata (IX-77), converted yacht
- Brave (IX-78), converted yacht
- El Cano (IX-79), converted yacht
- Christiana (IX-80), seaplane tender, ex-USLHT Azalea, briefly USS Azalea (returned to USLHT service), later YAG-32

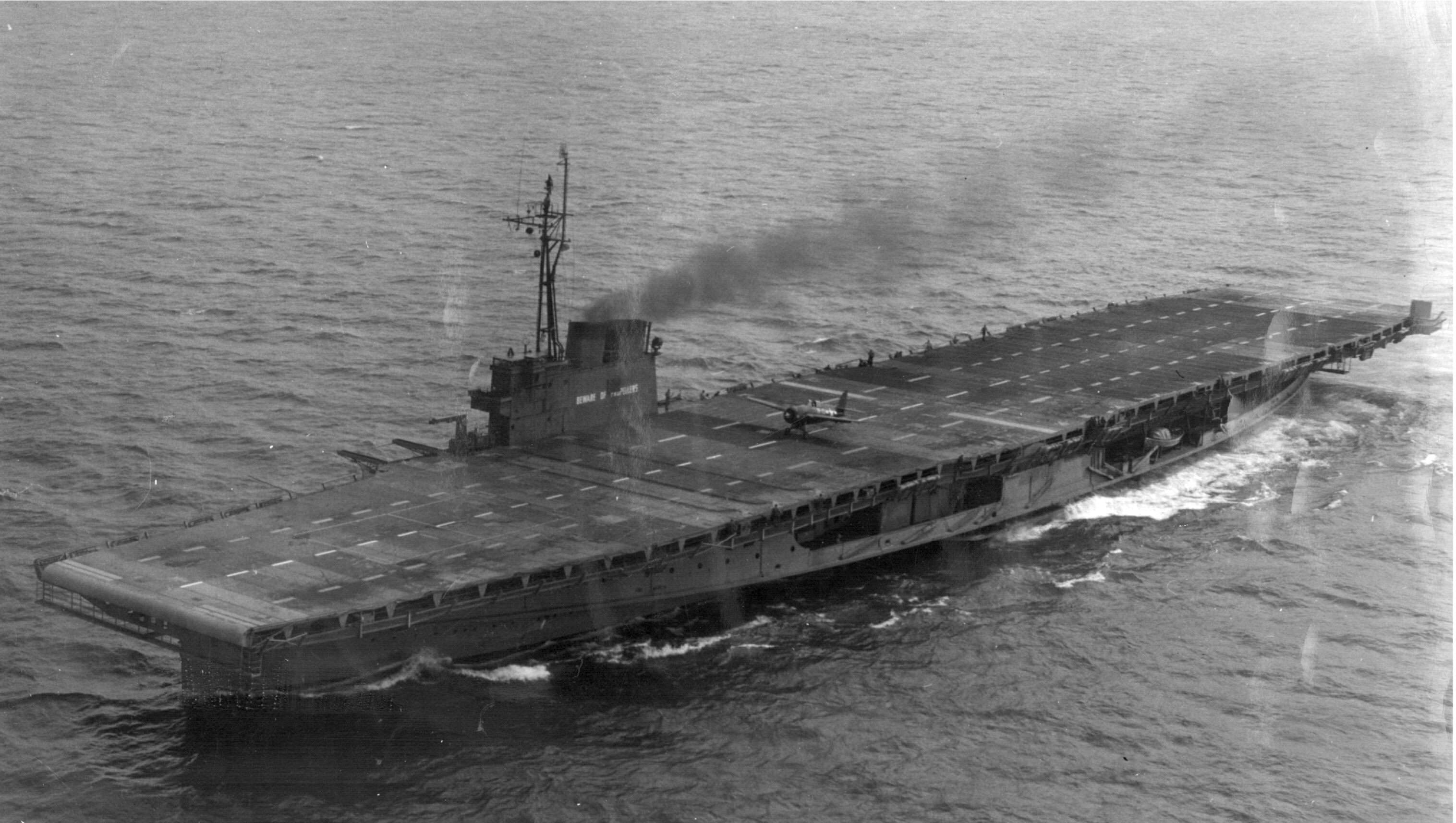
USS Sable (IX-81)

- Sable (IX-81), ex-SS Greater Buffalo, Great Lakes Aircraft Training Carrier (CV)
- Luster (IX-82), converted yacht
- Ashley (IX-83), converted yacht
- Congaree (IX-84), converted yacht
- Euhaw (IX-85), converted yacht
- Pocotaligo (IX-86), converted yacht
- Saluda (IX-87), converted yacht, sound test ship, later YAG-87
- Wimbee (IX-88), converted yacht
- Romain (IX-89), converted yacht
- Forbes (IX-90), converted yacht
- Palomas (IX-91), converted yacht
- Liston (IX-92), converted yacht

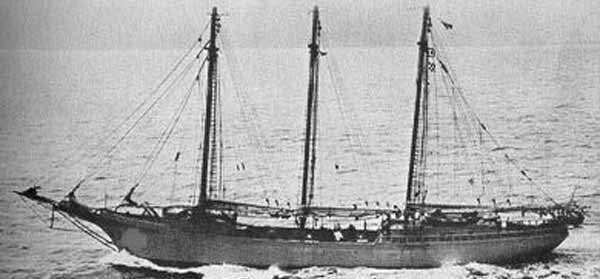
USS Irene Forsyte (IX-93)

- Irene Forsyte (IX-93), converted yacht, Q-ship (armed decoy)
- Ronaki (IX-94), converted yacht, grounded eastern Australia, 18 June 1943
- Echo (IX-95), converted yacht, inspiration for the movie The Wackiest Ship in The Army
- Richard Peck (IX-96), electric generator
- Martha's Vineyard (IX-97)

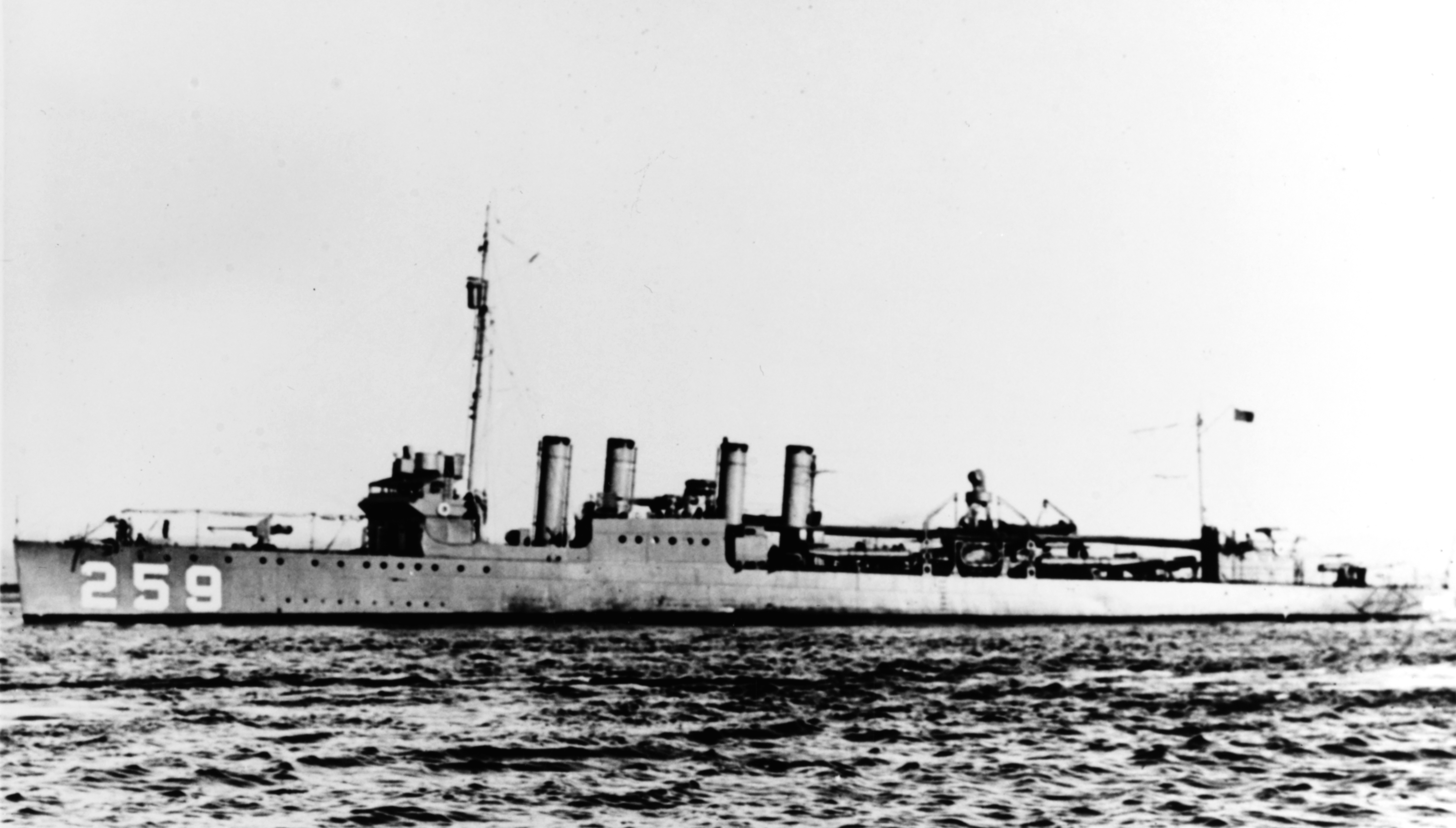
USS Moosehead (IX-98) as (DD-259)

- Moosehead (IX-98), ex-DD-259, ex-YW-56, combat information center training ship
- Sea Cloud (IX-99), ex-WPG-284 weather ship
- Racer (IX-100), ex-PC-501, SC-501
- Big Chief (IX-101)
- Majaba (IX-102), ex-SS El Capitan, ex-AG-43
- E.A. Poe (IX-103), MC type EC2, mobile base dry storage
- Peter H. Burnett (IX-104), MC type EC2, mobile base dry storage
- Panther (IX-105), ex-SC-1470
- Greyhound (IX-106), ex-ID-1672
- Zebra (IX-107), MC type EC2, later AKN-5
- Atlantida (IX-108)
- Antelope (IX-109), MC type EC2, mobile base dry storage

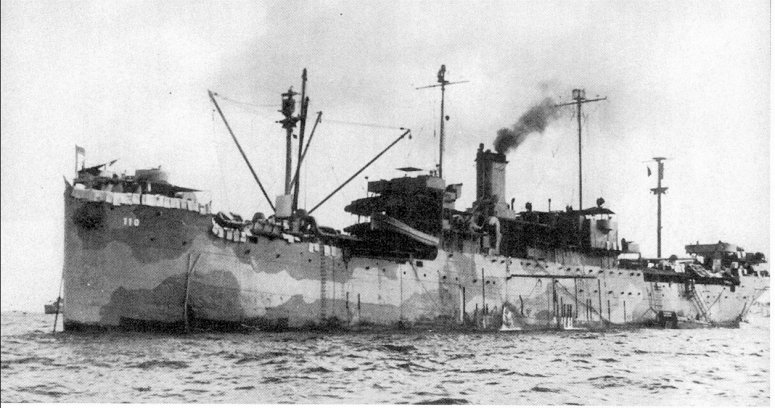
USS Ocelot (IX-110)

- Ocelot (IX-110), mobile base command ship, wrecked by Typhoon Louise Okinawa October 1945

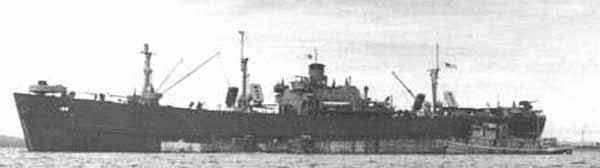
USS Porcupine (IX-126)

Armadillo-class: MC type Z-ET1-S-C3 hulls, mobile base storage tankers

- Armadillo (IX-111), ex-SS Sidney Howard
- Beagle (IX-112), ex-SS David Rittenhouse
- Camel (IX-113), ex-SS William H. Carruth
- Caribou (IX-114), ex-SS Nathaniel Palmer
- Elk (IX-115), ex-SS William Winter
- Gazelle (IX-116), ex-SS Cyrus K. Holliday
- Gemsbok (IX-117), ex-SS Carl R. Gray
- Giraffe (IX-118), ex-SS Sanford B. Dole
- Ibex (IX-119), ex-SS Nicholas Longworth
- Jaguar (IX-120), ex-SS Charles T. Yerkes
- Kangaroo (IX-121), ex-SS Paul Tulane
- Leopard (IX-122), ex-SS William B. Bankhead
- Mink (IX-123), ex-SS Judah Touro
- Moose (IX-124), ex-SS Mason L. Weems
- Panda (IX-125), ex-SS Opie Read
- Porcupine (IX-126), ex-SS Leif Ericson, sunk by kamikaze 30 December 1944, 7 killed
- Raccoon (IX-127), ex-SS J. C. W. Becham
- Stag (IX-128), ex-SS Norman O. Pedrick, converted to a distilling ship, later AW-1
- Whippet (IX-129), ex-SS Eugene W. Hilgard
- Wildcat (IX-130), ex-SS Leon Godchaux, converted to a distilling ship, later AW-2

Other unknown classes

- Abarenda (IX-131), ex-SS Acme ID-2103, mobile base storage tanker
- Andrew Doria (IX-132), ex-SS Aleibiades
- Antona (IX-133), ex-SS Birkenhead
- Arayat (IX-134), ex-SS Faireno, mobile base storage tanker
- Arethusa (IX-135), ex-SS Gargoyle, mobile base storage tanker
- Carondelet (IX-136), ex-SS Gold Heels, mobile base storage tanker
- Celtic (IX-137), ex-SS Kerry Patch
- Malvern (IX-138), ex-SS Orissa
- Octorara (IX-139), ex-SS Purisima, mobile base storage tanker
- Quiros (IX-140), ex-SS Osmand
- Manileno (IX-141)
- Signal (IX-142), ex-ID-1532, mobile base storage tanker
- Silver Cloud (IX-143), ex-AO-10, mobile base storage tanker
- Clyde (IX-144)
- Villalobos (IX-145)
- Fortune (IX-146), mobile base aviation stores ship, later AVS-2
- Supply (IX-147), mobile base aviation stores ship, later AVS-1
- North Star (IX-148), ex-WPG-59
- Mustang (IX-155), ex-William H. Smith (fishing schooner), amphibious training ship

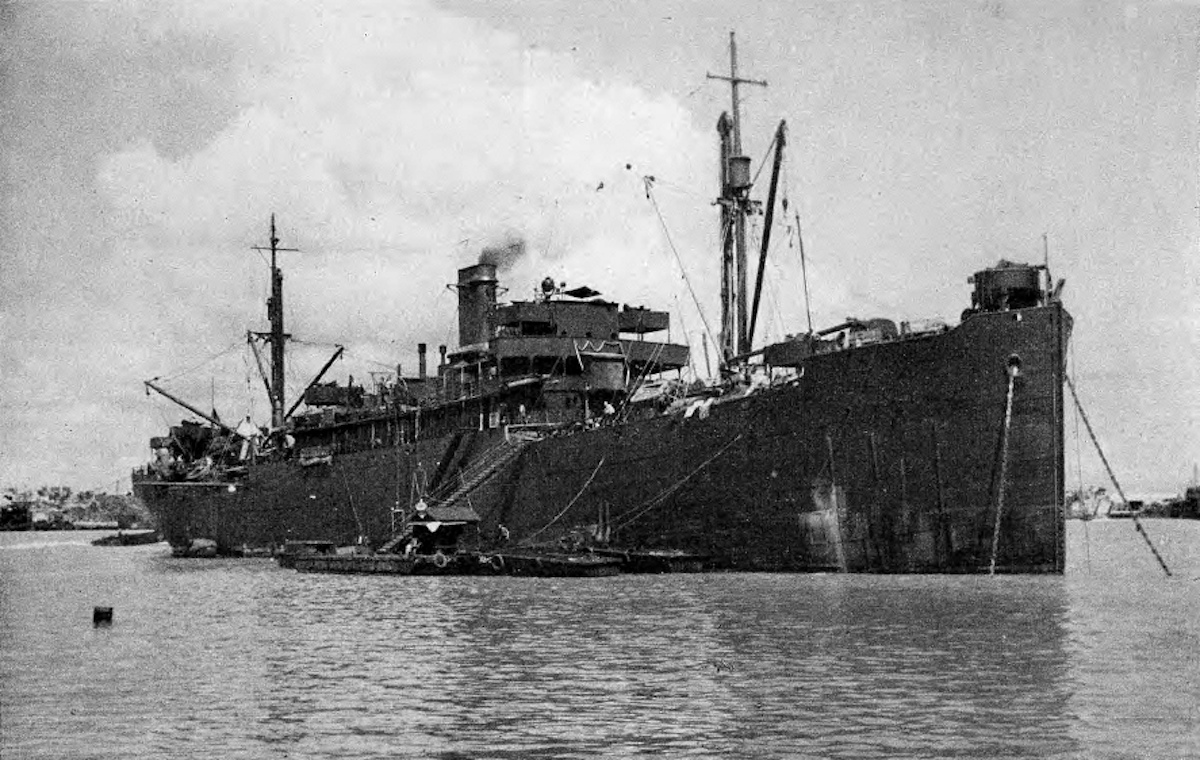
USS City of Dalhart (IX-156)

- City of Dalhart (IX-156), construction battalion (Seebee) command ship, Brodie landing system installed
- Orvetta (IX-157), ex-Tampa, mobile base barracks

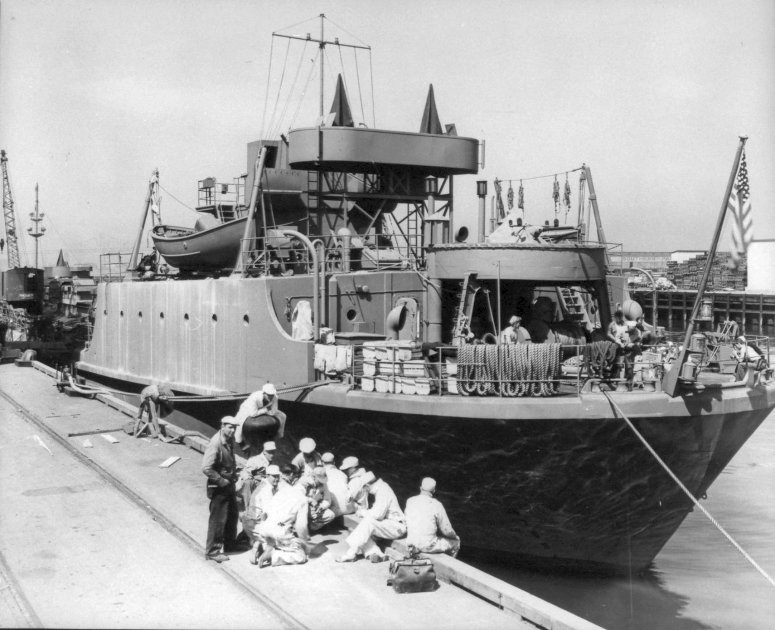
USS Trefoil (IX-149) as Midnight

Trefoil-class: MarCom B7-D1 concrete barges

- Midnight / Trefoil (IX-149)
- Quartz (IX-150), Operation Crossroads nuclear test participant
- Silica (IX-151), wrecked by Typhoon Louise Okinawa October 1945
- Carmita (IX-152), ex-Slate
- Asphalt (IX-153), wrecked 6 October 1944
- Bauxite (IX-154)
- Limestone (IX-158)
- Feldspar (IX-159)
- Marl (IX-160)
- Barite (IX-161)
- Lignite (IX-162), wrecked by Typhoon Louise Okinawa October 1945
- Cinnabar (IX-163)
- Corundum (IX-164)

Other unknown classes

- Flicker (IX-165), ex-AM-70
- Linnet (IX-166), ex-AM-76
- Leyden (IX-167), transport
- Southland (IX-168), transport

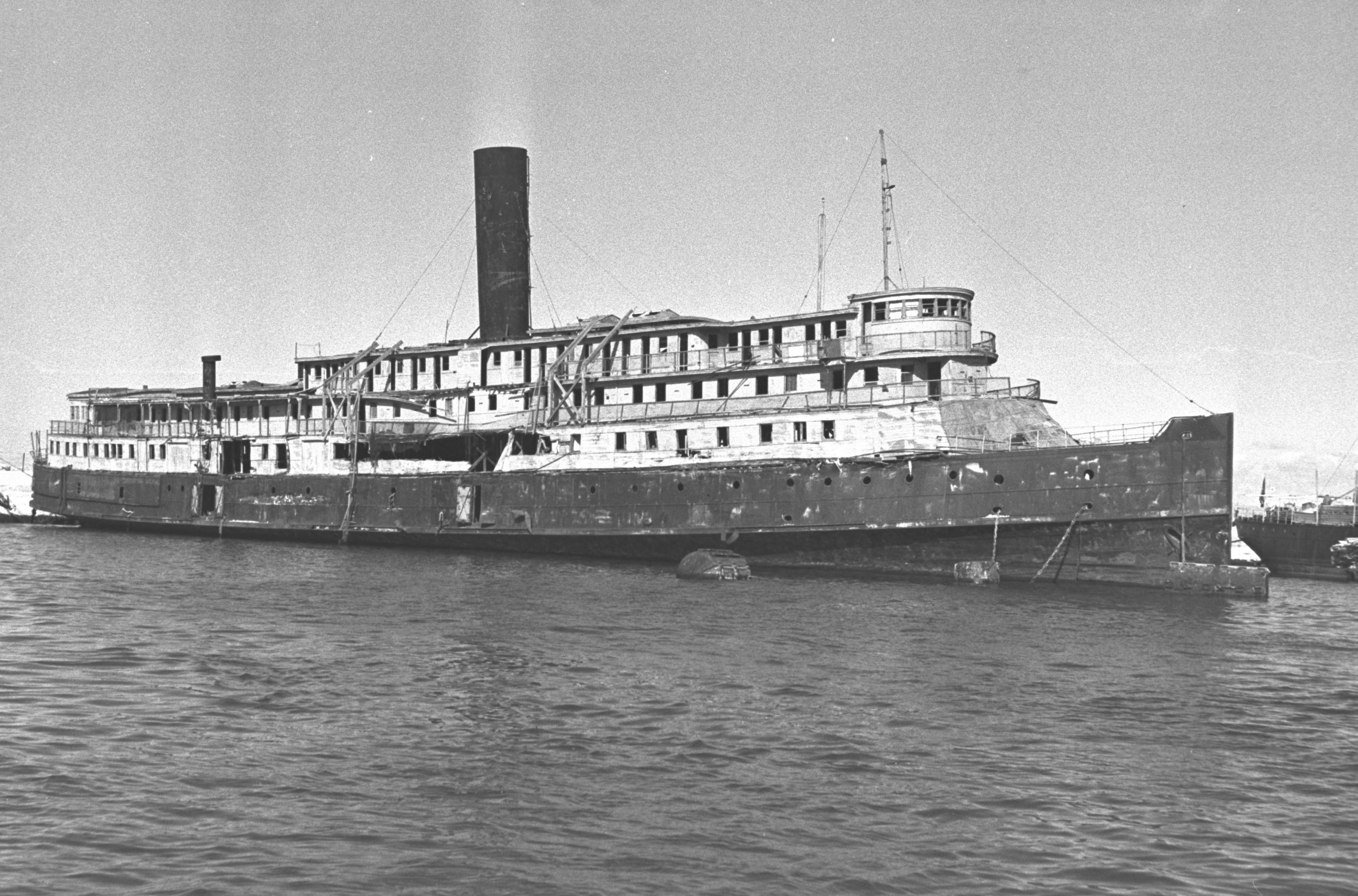
USS President Warfield (IX-169) as SS Exodus

- President Warfield (IX-169), transport, later SS Exodus
- Curlew (IX-170), ex-AM-69
- Albatross (IX-171), ex-AM-71
- Bluebird (IX-172), ex-AM-72
- Etamin (IX-173), MC type EC2, ex-AK-93
- Grumium (IX-174), MC type EC2, ex-AK-112, mobile base aviation stores ship, later AVS-3
- Kestrel (IX-175), ex-AMc-5
- Kingbird (IX-176), ex-AMc-56
- Nightingale (IX-177), ex-AMc-149
- Banshee (IX-178), ex-SS Fairbanks
- Kenwood (IX-179)
- Flamingo (IX-180), ex-AMc-22
- Egret (IX-181), ex-AMc-24
- Donnell (IX-182), ex-DE-56, electric generator
- Catbird (IX-183), ex-AM-68, mine testing
- Clifton (IX-184), ex-SS Dilworth
- Stonewall (IX-185), ex-SS Frank G. Drum
- Dawn (IX-186), mobile base storage tanker
- Belusan (IX-187), ex-SS Vistula
- Chotauk (IX-188), ex-SS American Arrow, mobile base storage tanker
- Marmora (IX-189), ex-SS F.C. Fitzsimmons, mobile base storage tanker
- Nausett (IX-190), ex-SS W.M. Irish, mobile base storage tanker
- Vandalia (IX-191), ex-SS Walter Jennings, mobile base storage tanker, wrecked by Typhoon Louise Okinawa October 1945
- Flambeau (IX-192), ex-SS S.B. Hunt, mobile base storage tanker
- Meredosia (IX-193)
- Killdeer (IX-194), ex-AMc-21
- Goshawk (IX-195), ex-AM-79
- Spark (IX-196), ex-LST-340
- Mariveles (IX-197)
- Cohasset (IX-198), ex-LST-129
- Barcleo (IX-199), ex-AMb-17, ex-YP-375
- Maratanza (IX-200), ex-YP-448
- Sterling (IX-201), ex-YP-449
- Liberator (IX-202), ex-AMc-87
- Agile (IX-203), ex-AMc-111
- Allioth (IX-204), MC type EC2, ex-AK-109, mobile base aviation stores ship, later AVS-4

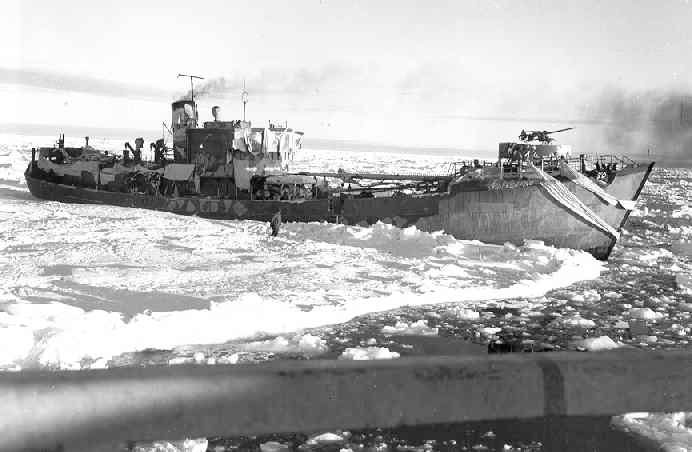
USS Callao (IX-205) as Externsteine

- Callao (IX-205), German icebreaker war prize Externsteine
- Chocura (IX-206), ex-PC-452

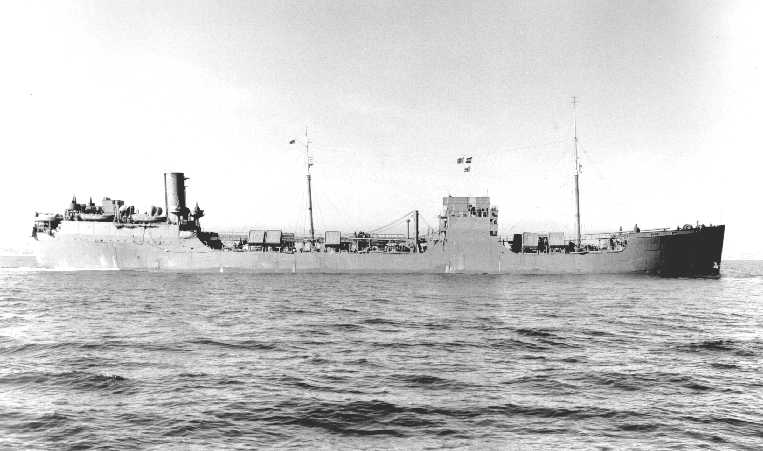
USS Big Horn (IX-207)

- Big Horn (IX-207), ex-AO-45, ex-Q-ship (armed decoy), oil storage vessel
- Domino (IX-208), mobile base dry storage, not acquired
- Seaward (IX-209), ex-LST-278
- Sea Foam (IX-210), mobile base storage tanker
- Castine (IX-211), ex-PC-452, experimental engine
- IX-212, ex-LCI(G)-396
- Serapis (IX-213), ex-SS District of Columbia, mobile base storage tanker
- Yucca (IX-214), ex-SS Utacarbon
- Don Marquis (IX-215), MC type EC2, mobile base dry storage
- Unicoi (IX-216), mobile base dry storage
- Tackle (IX-217), ex-ARST-4
- Gardoqui (IX-218), mobile base storage tanker
- Eureka (IX-221), ex-PC-488
- Pegasus (IX-222), ex-AK-48, mobile base dry storage
- Triana (IX-223), MC type EC2, mobile base dry storage
- Aide de Camp (IX-224), sonar research, converted yacht
- Harcourt (IX-225), MC type EC2
- Araner (IX-226), MC type EC2
- Gamage (IX-227) - same ship as Inca (IX-229)
- Justin (IX-228), MC type EC2
- Inca (IX-229), MC type EC2, mobile base dry storage, grounded by Typhoon Louise Okinawa October 1945
- Tapacola (IX-230), ex-AMc-54, target tug
- Stalwart (IX-231), ex-AMc-105, target tug
- Summit (IX-232), ex-AMc-106, target tug
- Canandaigua (IX-233), sonar test schooner, sank at pier in storm 22 November 1945
- Eastwind (IX-234), German racing yacht war prize
- Royone (IX-235), Naval Academy yacht

IX-236 through IX-299 unused

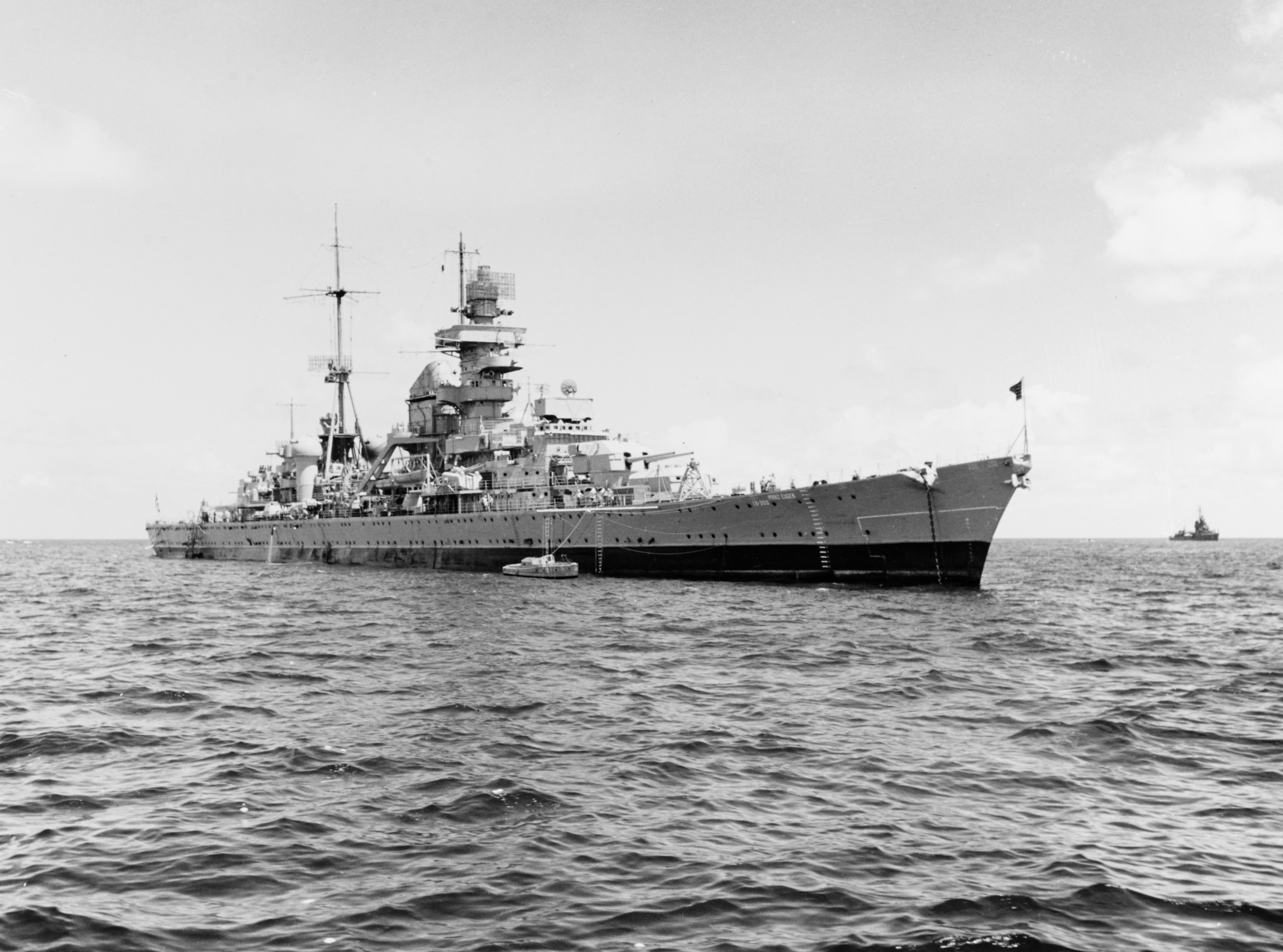
USS Prinz Eugen (IX-300)

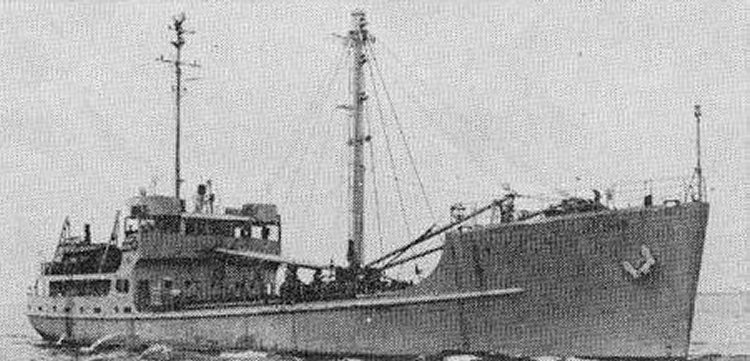
USNS New Bedford (IX-308) as FS-289

- Prinz Eugen (IX-300), German cruiser war prize, Operation Crossroads target
- Dithmarschen (IX-301), German replenishment oiler war prize, later USS Conecuh (AO-110 / AOR-110)
- Atlanta (IX-304), ex-CL-104, weapons effects test ship
- Prowess (IX-305), ex-AM-280, ex-MSF-280, training ship
- USS IX-306, ex-US Army FS-221
- Brier (IX-307), ex-WLI-299
- New Bedford (IX-308), ex-US Army FS-289, ex-AKL-17, Texas Towers support ship, torpedo testing
- Monob One (IX-309), ex-YW-87, later YAG-61
- USS IX-310, sonar test barge
- Benewah (IX-311), ex-APB-35
- Horst Wessel (IX-327), German barque war prize, later USCGC Eagle (WIX-327)

IX-328 through IX-500 unused

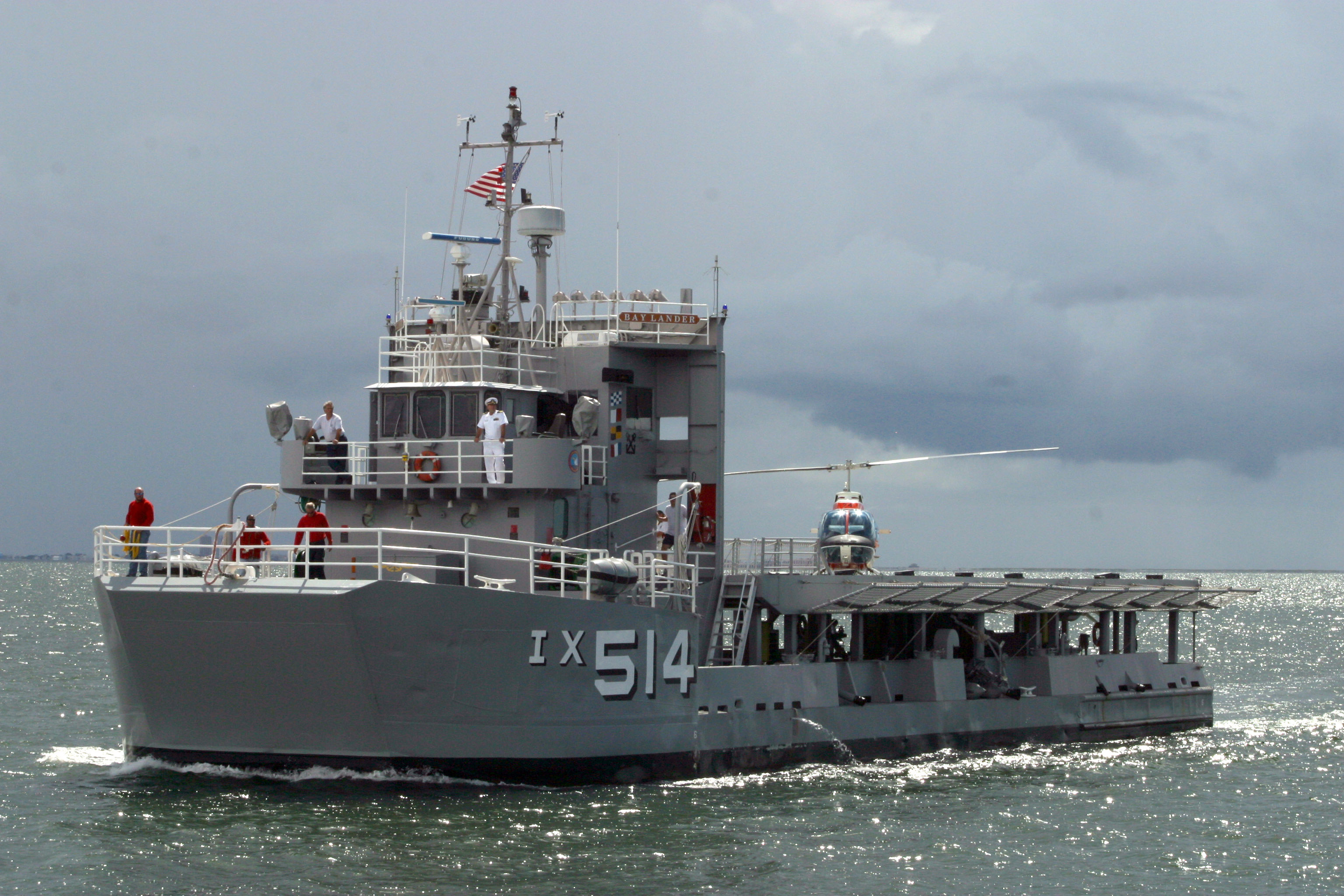
Baylander (IX-514)

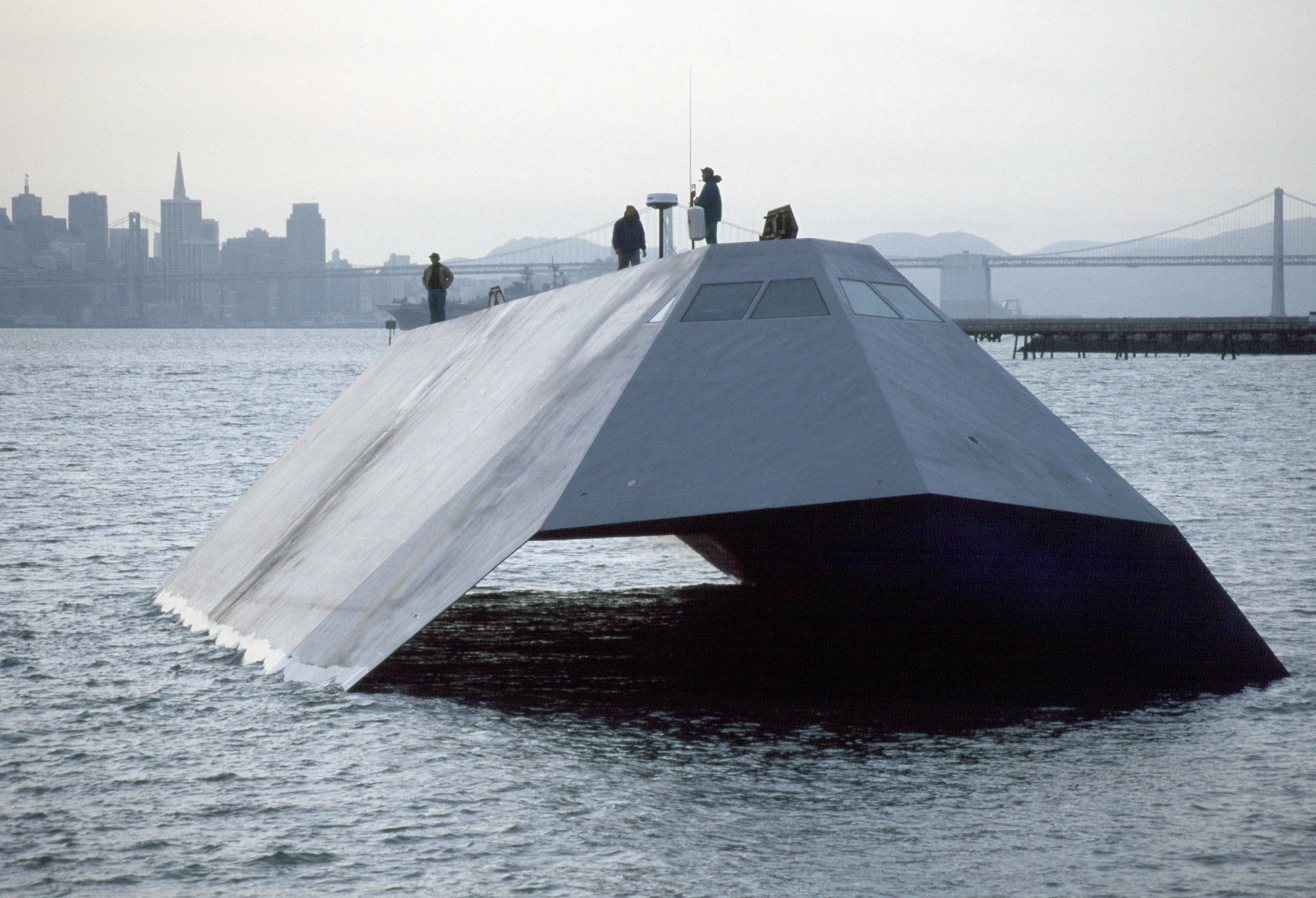
Sea Shadow (IX-529)

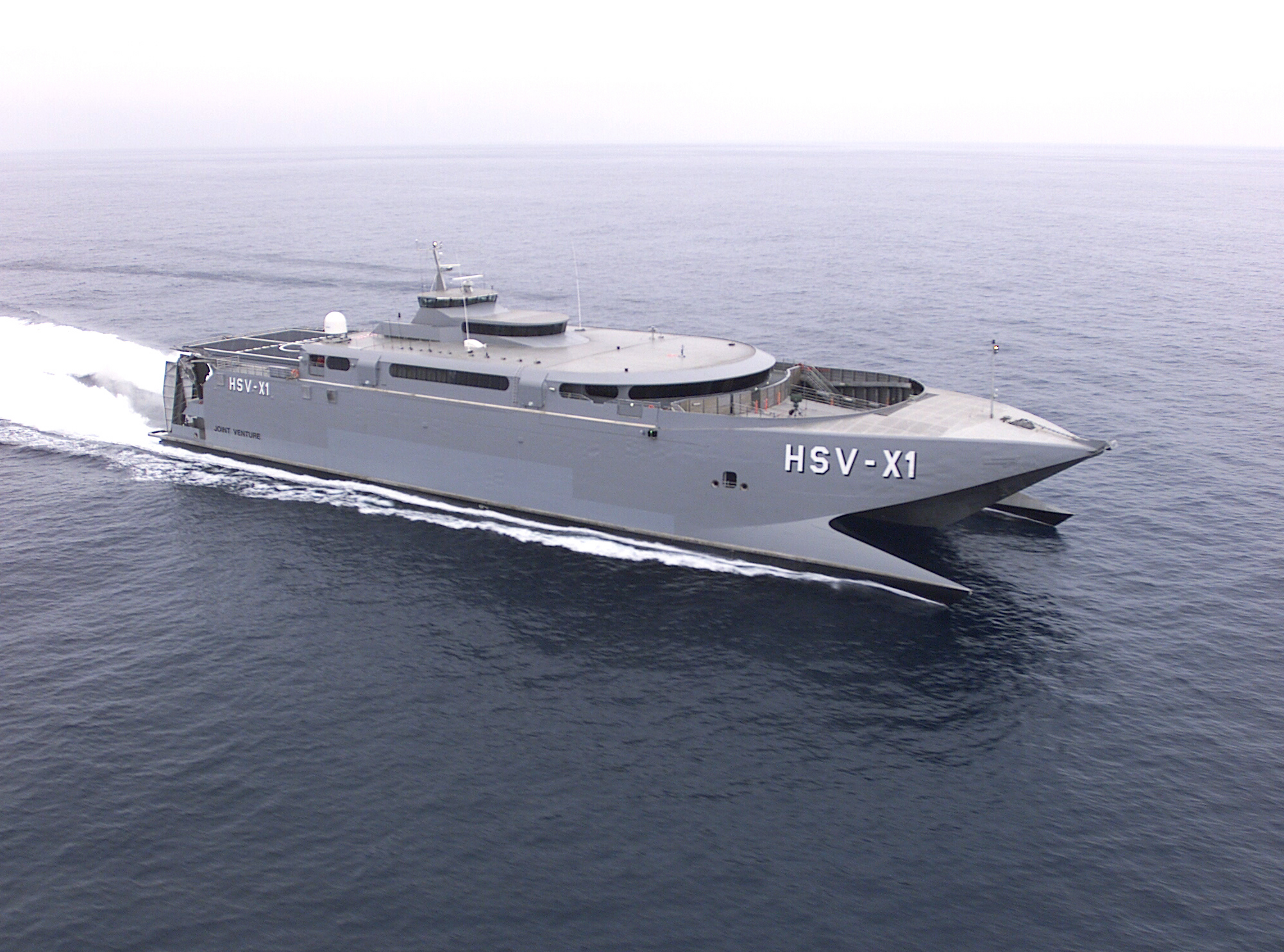
Joint Venture (IX-532)

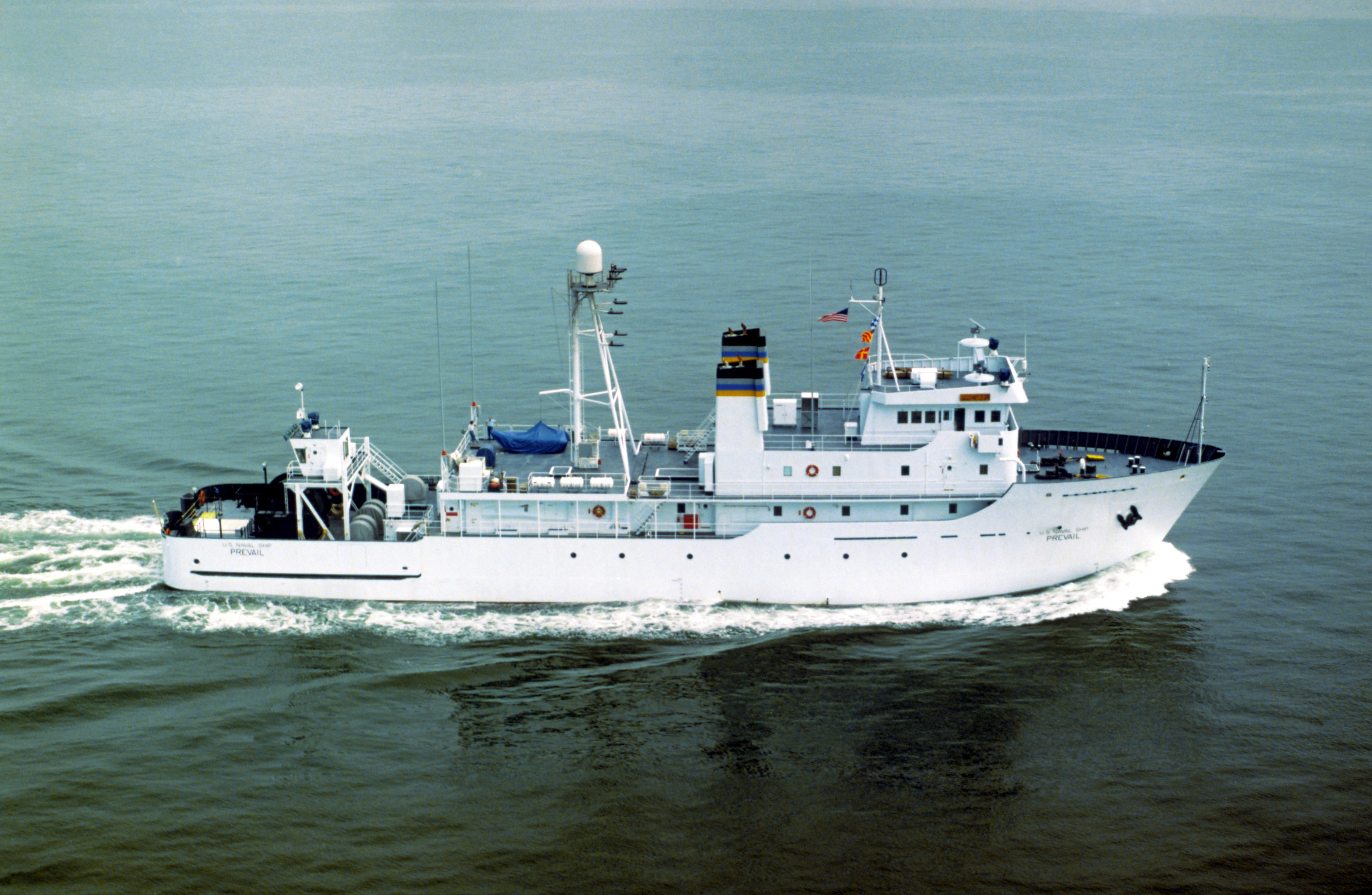
USNS Prevail (IX-537) as (T-AGOS-8)

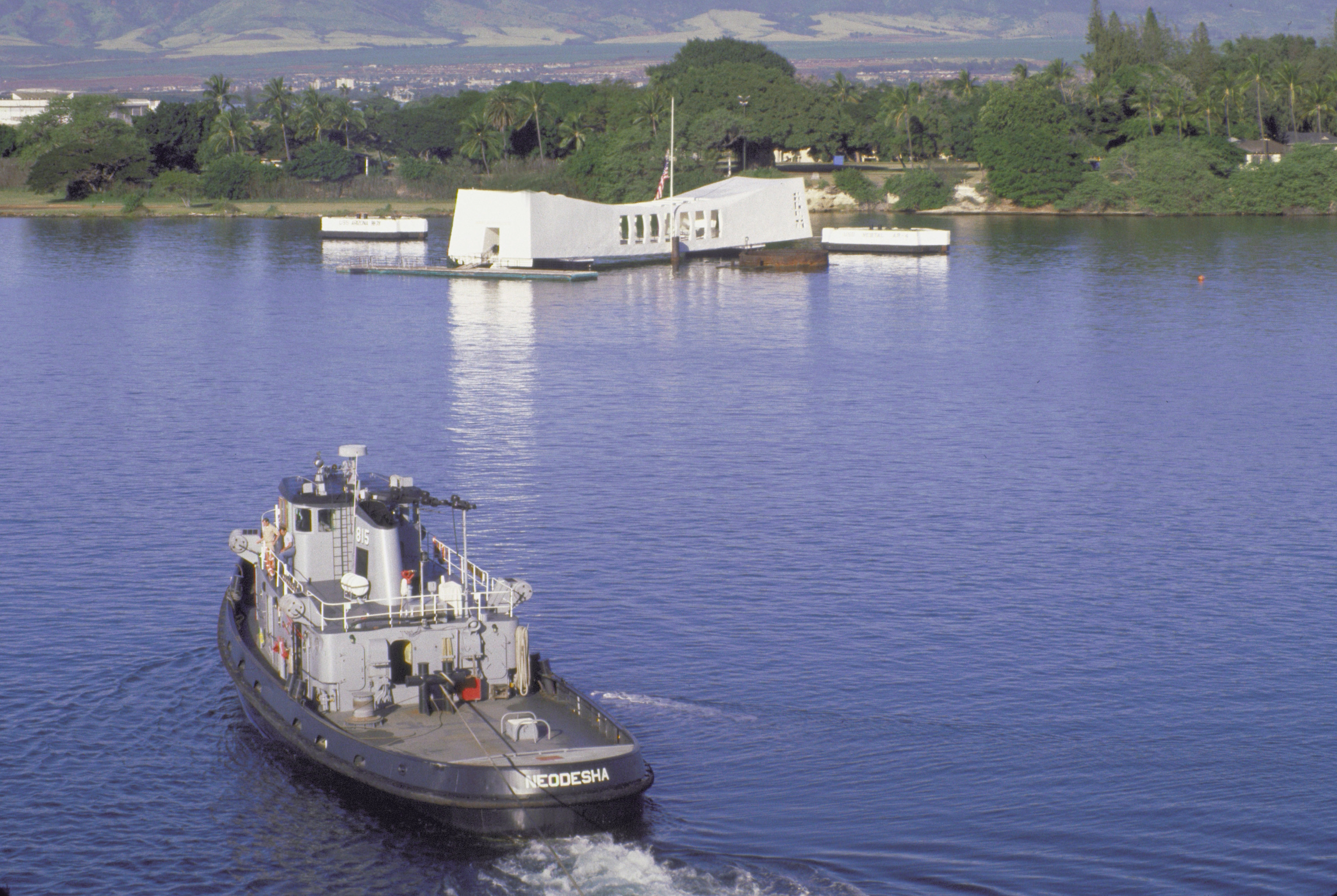
USS Neodesha (IX-540) as (YTB-815)

- Elk River (IX-501), ex-LSM-501, ex-LSMR-501, barracks ship
- Mercer (IX-502), ex-APB-39
- Nueces (IX-503), ex-APB-40
- Echols (IX-504), ex-APL-37, ex-APB-37
- IX-505, ex-YTM-759
- IX-506, ex-YFU-82
- General Hugh J. Gaffey (IX-507), ex-AP-121
- Orca (IX-508), ex-LCU-1618, ROV/AUV test support
- USS Underwater Explosives Barge Number 1 (IX-509)
- USS IX-510, ex-T-AP-127, barracks hulk
- USS IX-511, ex-LST-399
- IX-512, ex-US Army BD 6651
- IX-513, EMPRESS II (Electromagnetic Pulse Environment Simulator for Ships)
- Baylander (IX-514), ex-YFU-79, 1986 conversion to a helicopter Landing Ship for pilot training, nicknamed the "world's smallest aircraft carrier"
- IX-515, ex-WSES-1 (surface effect ship)
- IX-516, 3-story classroom Trident missile training barge
- Gosport (IX-517), ex-Pacific Escort, ex-Thomas G. Thompson
- Proteus (IX-518), ex-AS-19, berthing craft
- USS IX-519, ex-YC-1643, boat landing stage
- USS IX-520, ex-APL-19
- USS IX-521, ex-AFDB-1, section D
- USS IX-522, ex-ABSD-2, ex-AFDB-2, section D, target support barge
- USS IX-523, ex-YOG-93, training hulk (boarding party tactics)
- USS IX-524, ex-ABSD-2, ex-AFDB-2, section F, target support barge
- USS IX-525, ex-AFDB-1, section C
- USS IX-526, ex-YRST-1, later YR-94
- USS IX-527, ex-YFN-1259, submarine test support barge
- USS IX-528, ex-YR-55, ex-YRDH-1, submarine test support barge
- Sea Shadow (IX-529), radar stealth technology demonstrator
- USS IX-530, ex-YFN-268, ex-YFND-5
- USS IX-531, ex-YP-679
- Joint Venture (IX-532), experimental high speed transport
- USS IX-533, ex-US Army BD 6652, ex-YD-222
- USS IX-534, ex-ABSD-2, ex-AFDB-2, section B
- USS IX-535, ex-ABSD-2, ex-AFDB-2, section H
- USS IX-536
- Prevail (IX-537) [A], ex-AGOS-8, Training Support Vessel
- USS IX-538
- USS IX-539
- Neodesha (IX-540), ex-YTB-815, non-operational training hulk
- USS IX-541
- USS White Bush (IX-542), ex-YF-339, ex-WLM-542
- USS IX-543
- USS IX-544
- USS IX-545, ex-YTB-814, reusable target vehicle

== Unclassified miscellaneous submarines (IXSS) ==
A number of submarines were briefly given the IXSS hull symbol in 1971 prior to their disposal, nearly all had previously held the AGSS designation.

Gato class

- Cod (IXSS-224), ex-SS-224, AGSS-224, museum ship
- Rasher (IXSS-269), ex-SS-269, SSR-269, AGSS-269

Balao class

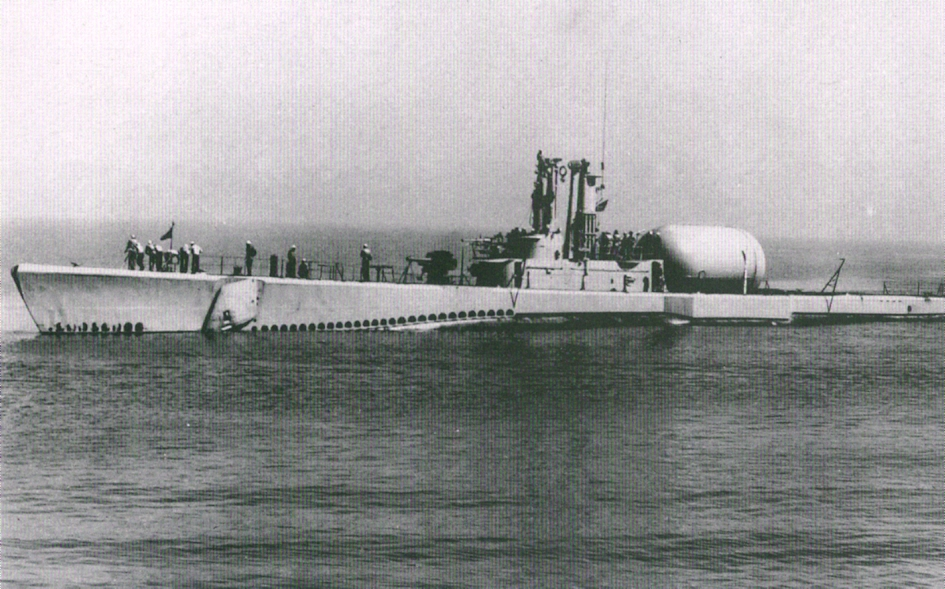
USS Perch as (ASSP-313)

- Bowfin (IXSS-287), ex-SS-287, AGSS-287, museum ship
- Ling (IXSS-297), ex-SS-297, AGSS-297, museum ship
- Lionfish (IXSS-298), ex-SS-298, AGSS-298, museum ship
- Roncador (IXSS-301), ex-SS-301, AGSS-301
- Perch (IXSS-313), ex-SS-313, SSP-313, ASSP-313, APSS-313, LPSS-313
- Charr (IXSS-328), ex-SS-328, AGSS-328
- Carp (IXSS-338), ex-SS-338, AGSS-338
- Chopper (IXSS-342), ex-SS-342, AGSS-342
- Pampanito (IXSS-383), ex-SS-383, AGSS-383, museum ship

Tench class

- Torsk (IXSS-423), ex-SS-423, AGSS-423, museum ship
- Runner (IXSS-476), ex-SS-476, AGSS-476
- Requin (IXSS-481), ex-SS-481, SSR-481, AGSS-471, museum ship

== See also ==
- Liberty ship § World War II
- List of current ships of the United States Navy
- List of United States Navy ships
- List of United States Navy losses in World War II § Unclassified miscellaneous (IX) - abbreviated list
- List of U.S. Navy ships sunk or damaged in action during World War II § Miscellaneous unclassified (IX) - detailed list
- List of United States Navy hospital ships § Receiving Ships, Supply Ships, and Guard Ships
