= USS Zahma =

U.S. navy ship

History

United States
- Name: USS Zahma
- Builder: George Lawley & Son, Neponset, Massachusetts
- Launched: 1915
- In service: 26 February 1942
- Out of service: 13 April 1943
- Stricken: 18 July 1944
- Fate: Unknown

General characteristics
- Type: Ketch
- Displacement: 75 tons
- Length: 93 ft (28 m)
- Beam: 20 ft 7 in (6.27 m)
- Draft: 7 ft 9 in (2.36 m)
- Depth of hold: 9 ft 10 in (3.00 m)
- Speed: 8 kn (15 km/h; 9.2 mph)
- Complement: 6 officers and men

USS Zahma (IX-63), an unclassified miscellaneous vessel, was the only ship of the United States Navy to be given that name. A wooden-hulled ketch with an auxiliary engine, she was designed by Bowdoin B. Crowninshield and completed in 1915 at Neponset, Massachusetts, by George Lawley & Son, for John H. Cromwell of Cold Spring Harbor, Long Island, New York. Inspected by the Navy at the entry of the United States into World War I for possible service as a patrol craft, the vessel was rejected as "unsuitable for naval use."

A quarter of a century later, the exigencies of war changed the Navy's evaluation of the graceful craft, as she was again inspected, this time at the 11th Naval District, in early 1942. Acquired by the Port Director of San Diego, California, from R. J. Rheem on 13 February, Zahma was placed in service on 26 February 1942. Classified as an unclassified miscellaneous vessel and designated IX-63, Zahma was based at San Diego and operated as a local patrol craft into the spring of 1943. Placed out of service on 13 April 1943, her name was struck from the Naval Vessel Register on 18 July 1944.
