= Freedom (IX-43) =

Unclassified miscellaneous vessel of the US Navy in service 1940-42

USS Freedom
History

United States
- Name: USS Freedom
- Owner: United States government
- Operator: United States Navy
- Port of registry: IX-43
- Builder: Great Lakes Boat Building Co.
- Acquired: 10 September 1940
- In service: 10 September 1940
- Out of service: 1962
- Fate: Unknown
- Notes: Ship Radio Callsign: NACY

General characteristics
- Type: Two Masted Auxiliary Schooner
- Displacement: 60 light tons, 72 gross tons
- Length: 88 Feet 8 Inches
- Beam: 20 Feet
- Propulsion: Hall Scott Gasoline auxiliary engine single propeller,175 shp
- Armor: none
- Aircraft carried: none
- Aviation facilities: none

Freedom (IX-43), an unclassified miscellaneous vessel, was the second ship of the United States Navy of that name. An auxiliary schooner, she was acquired by the Navy in 1940, and assigned to the United States Naval Academy where she served in a noncommissioned status through 1962.

== History ==
An Act of Congress of 6 June 1940 authorized the Secretary of the Navy to accept without expense to the Government the 88-foot 2-masted schooner Freedom and her equipment as a gift to the Naval Academy from her owner J. Sterling Morton, nephew of former Secretary of the Navy Paul Morton. She had been designed by John G. Alden and built at Milwaukee, Wisconsin. The yacht was delivered to the Navy on September 10, 1940, at the shipyard of Henry B. Nevins, Inc., City Island, Bronx and arrived at the Naval Academy two days later. On 24 October 1940 the Chief of Naval Operations assigned her the class designation "Unclassified" and directed that her name be retained. On 8 January 1941 the Secretary of the Navy approved the adoption by the BuShips of the symbol IX, already in use in the Navy Filing Manual, for vessels designated "Unclassified," and BuShips assigned her the hull designation IX-43.

Freedomproved to be an excellent boat for ocean cruising and for teaching midshipmen how to handle a large sailing rig. She was sold in 1968, following the investigation of the faltering sailing program at the Naval Academy by the Fales Committee in the mid-1960s.

Purchased by the Harry Lundeberg School of Seamanship in Annapolis, Md., she became the miscellaneous function (training) vessel Freedom and was still in service in 1972.
