= USS Sea Otter II =

History

United States
- Name: USS Sea Otter II
- Builder: Levingston Shipbuilding Co., Orange, Texas
- Launched: 23 August 1941
- Sponsored by: Mrs. Eads Johnson
- Acquired: 26 September 1941
- Commissioned: 26 October 1941
- Decommissioned: 28 May 1942
- Stricken: 8 May 1946
- Fate: Transferred to the War Shipping Administration, 26 June 1942

General characteristics
- Displacement: 1,941 long tons (1,972 t)
- Length: 254 ft (77 m)
- Beam: 38 ft (12 m)
- Draft: 10 ft 2 in (3.10 m)
- Complement: 15

USS Sea Otter II was a ship of the United States Navy during World War II. Launched on 23 August 1941 by the Levingston Shipbuilding in Orange, Texas., sponsored by Mrs. Eads Johnson, wife of the designer, she was acquired by the US Navy on 26 September 1941 and placed in service on 26 October 1941.

== Service history ==
Sea Otter II proceeded to the Charleston Navy Yard on 26 October 1941, arriving on 2 November. After completion of voyage repairs, Sea Otter II got underway for sea trials on 4 November.

Constructed during the height of enemy submarine attacks along the Atlantic coast, Sea Otter II was designed to allow torpedoes to pass beneath her shallow draft. The draft, however, proved to be almost twice the amount expected, and her 16 unmuffled gasoline engines would be noisy enough to alert any submarine in the area.

Consequently, Sea Otter II, like her predecessor, the 80-foot shallow draft Sea Otter I (IX-51), was destined for little use. She remained at Charleston until being placed out of service on 28 May 1942. On 26 June, she was transferred to the War Shipping Administration, subsequently transferred to Cargoes Incorporated, and struck from the Navy list on 8 May 1946.

== Sources ==
- Photo gallery of USS Sea Otter II at NavSource Naval History
