= Waxahachie (YTB-814) =

Tugboat of the United States Navy

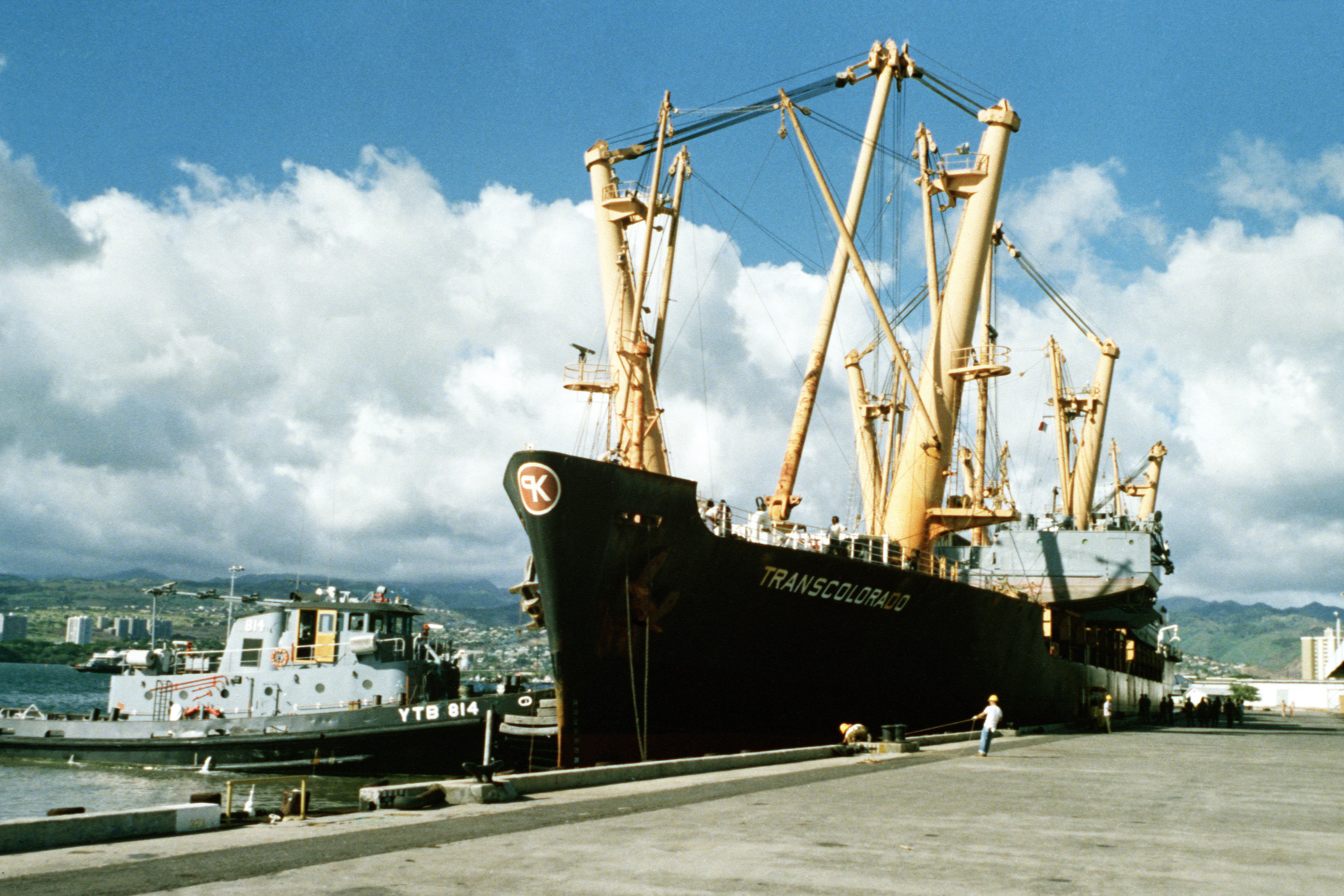
- Waxahachie at left

History

United States
- Namesake: Waxahachie, Texas
- Awarded: 22 June 1970
- Builder: Peterson Builders, Sturgeon Bay, Wisconsin
- Laid down: 1 April 1971
- Launched: 9 September 1971
- Acquired: 2 January 1972
- Decommissioned: 2006
- Reclassified: IX-545
- Stricken: 27 September 2011

General characteristics
- Class & type: Natick-class large harbor tug
- Displacement: 283 long tons (288 t) (light); 356 long tons (362 t) (full)
- Length: 109 ft (33 m)
- Beam: 31 ft (9.4 m)
- Draft: 14 ft (4.3 m)
- Propulsion: One diesel propulsion engine, 2,000 hp (1,500 kW)
- Speed: 12 knots (22 km/h; 14 mph)
- Complement: 12
- Armament: None

Waxahachie (YTB-814), sometimes misspelled Waxahatchie, was a United States Navy Natick-class large harbor tug named for Waxahachie, Texas.

== Construction ==
The contract for Waxahachie was awarded 22 June 1970. She was laid down on 1 April 1971 at Sturgeon Bay, Wisconsin, by Peterson Builders and launched 9 September 1971.

== Operational history ==
Delivered to the Navy on 4 January 1972 at Pearl Harbor, Hawaii, Waxahachie was assigned to the 14th Naval District. She continued to serve the fleet actively, providing tug and tow services, as well as pilot assistance, at the busy Pacific Fleet base at Pearl Harbor into 1980.

On 3 August 2007, she was reclassified as an unclassified miscellaneous vessel, stripped of her name, and given the hull number IX-545. For the remainder of her career, IX-545 served as a reusable target vehicle.

Stricken from the Navy Directory on 27 September 2011, the former Waxahachie awaits disposal.

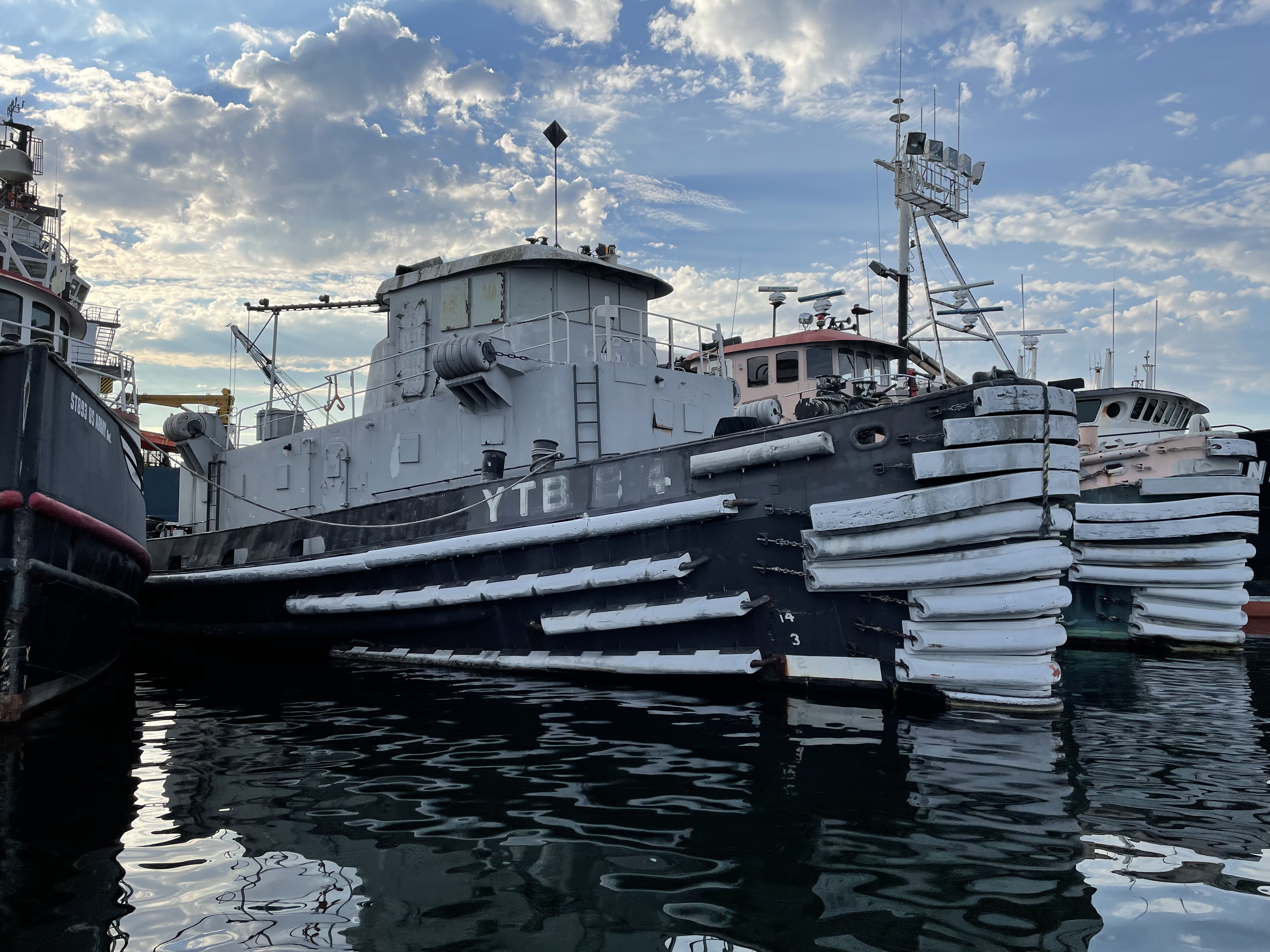
Former Waxahachie in Seattle, Washington

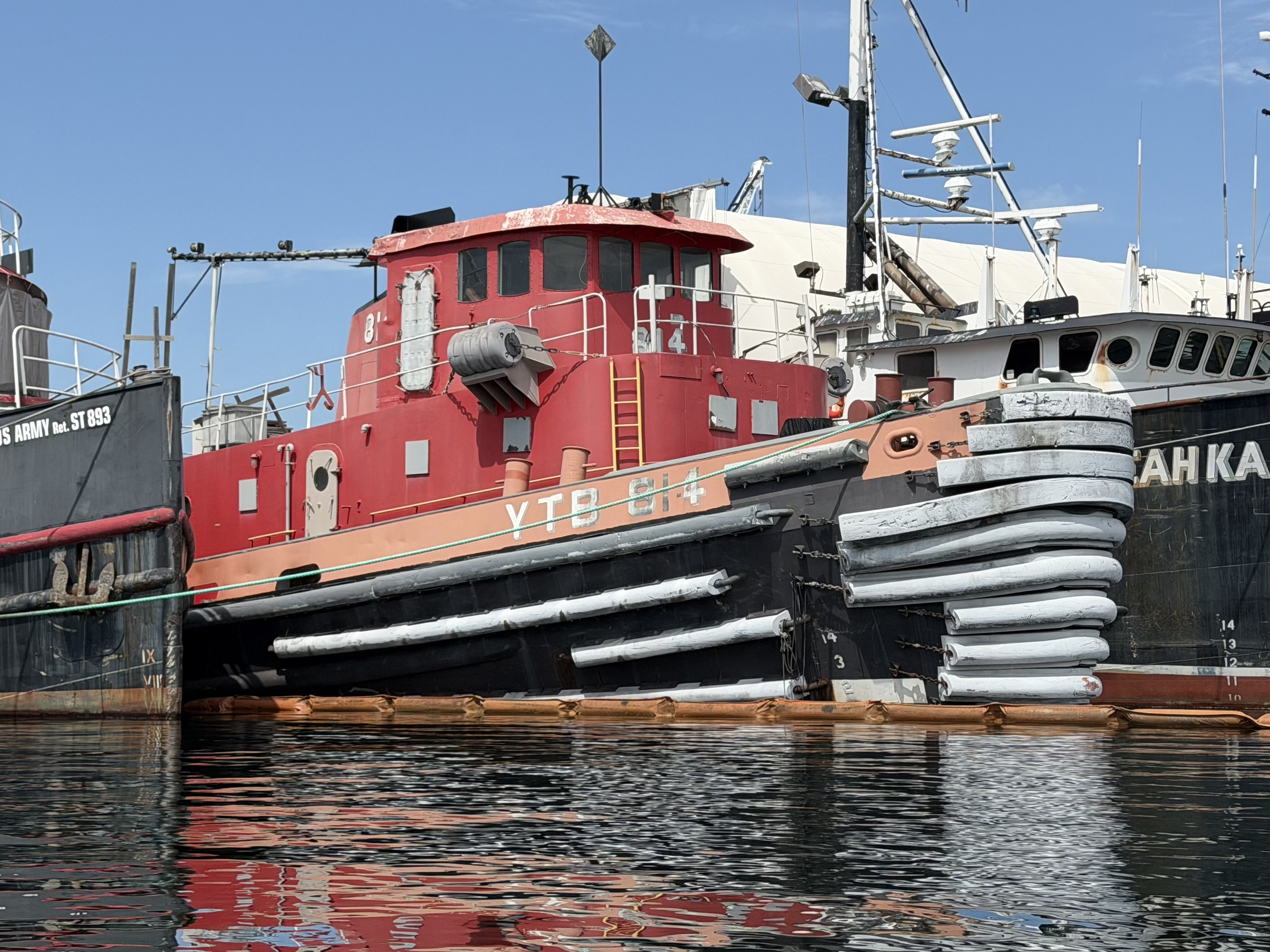
Ex-Waxahachie berthed in Seattle, Washington, 2026
