= USS Briarcliff =

History

United States
- Laid down: 1919
- Out of service: 25 November 1938
- Stricken: 29 December 1938
- Fate: Sank at her moorings, raised and resunk in deep water

General characteristics
- Displacement: 5990 tons
- Length: 268 ft (82 m)
- Beam: 45 ft 2 in (13.77 m)
- Draught: 23 ft 10 in (7.26 m)
- Speed: not self-propelled
- Armament: one four-inch gun

USS Briarcliff (IX-3), an unclassified miscellaneous vessel, was the only ship of the United States Navy of that name. A wooden-hulled freighter, she was constructed in 1919 at Portland, Maine, by the Russell Shipbuilding Company as a Design 1001 ship for the Emergency Fleet Corporation of the United States Shipping Board (USSB). Originally the Briarcliff was designed to increase the merchant fleet during World War I; however, before she could be completed, the war ended.

The Briarcliff would have rotted in Maine were it not for Lt. Commander Charles Reginald Jacobsen who was looking for a home for his reservists in New York. On 1 January 1922 she was acquired by the Navy from the USSB in an incomplete condition. Since she had neither engines nor boilers, she served as a floating armory and training vessel for the 33rd Fleet Militia at the Tompkinsville section of Staten Island, Pier 8.

That duty lasted until 25 November 1938 when she sank at her moorings as a result of a rotting hull. Later raised and inspected, she was declared unserviceable. Briarcliff was towed to deep water and sunk on 29 December 1938. Her name was struck from the Naval Vessel Register that same day.

Her memory lives on as the name of a chapter of the NAVAL ENLISTED RESERVE ASSOCIATION, an organization of veterans of the Navy, Marine Corps, and Coast Guard. The chapter is located in Staten Island, NY. (H)
