= Neodesha (YTB-815) =

Tugboat of the United States Navy

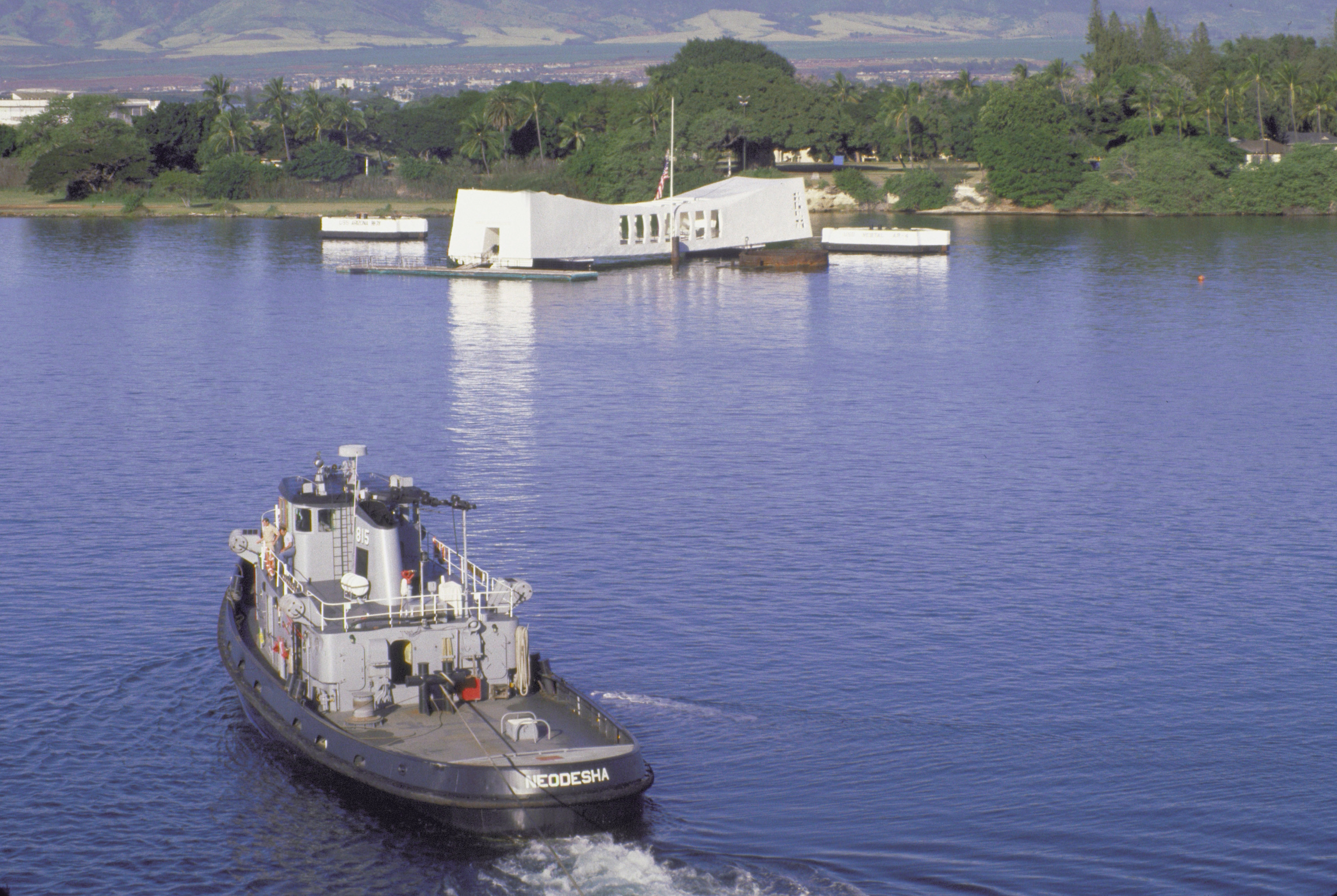
- Neodesha (YTB-815) approaches the USS Arizona (BB-39) Memorial at Naval Station Pearl Harbor in December 1984.

History

United States
- Awarded: 22 June 1970
- Builder: Peterson Builders, Sturgeon Bay, Wisconsin, U.S.
- Laid down: 10 May 1971
- Launched: 6 October 1971
- Acquired: 2 January 1972
- Reclassified: IX-540, 3 August 2007
- Stricken: 28 May 2021

General characteristics
- Class & type: Natick-class large harbor tug
- Displacement: 282 long tons (287 t) (light); 344 long tons (350 t) (full)
- Length: 109 ft (33 m)
- Beam: 31 ft (9.4 m)
- Draft: 14 ft (4.3 m)
- Speed: 12 knots (14 mph; 22 km/h)
- Complement: 12
- Armament: None

Neodesha (YTB-815) was a United States Navy Natick-class large harbor tug.

== Construction ==
The contract for Neodesha was awarded on 22 June 1970. She was laid down on 10 May 1971 at Sturgeon Bay, Wisconsin, by Peterson Builders and launched 6 October 1971.

== Operational history ==
Neodesha served the 14th Naval District at Pearl Harbor, Hawaii.

On 3 August 2007 she was reclassified as an unclassified miscellaneous vessel, given the hull number IX-540. Neodesha is assigned to Mobile Diving and Salvage Unit One as a non-operational training hulk. Neodesha was stricken from the naval register on 28 May 2021.
