= USS El Cano =

History

United States
- Name: USS El Cano
- Namesake: USS Elcano
- Acquired: 8 August 1942, as Pioneer
- Renamed: El Cano, 17 August 1942
- Fate: Struck from Naval Register, Disposed of, 24 October 1945
- Status: Laid up, awaiting buyer (2009)

General characteristics
- Type: Schooner
- Displacement: 600 long tons (610 t)

USS El Cano (IX-79), an unclassified miscellaneous vessel, was the only ship of the United States Navy to be named for Elcano (PG-38). A schooner, she was acquired on 8 August 1942 as Pioneer, renamed El Cano on 17 August 1942, and served in a noncommissioned status in the 11th Naval District during World War II.

== Ship History ==
On 13 Jul 42 VCNO asked BuShips to negotiate a bareboat charter agreement with the owner of the auxiliary steel schooner yacht PIONEER at $1.00 per year. This vessel had been designed by Cox & Stevens and built by Krupp's Germaniawerft at Kiel, Germany, in 1927 as CRESSIDA for the German-American industrialist Hermann Oelrichs, who was a member of the Vanderbilt family. She was reputed to be one of the fastest tall ships on the west coast, often making 14 knots in races off Newport Beach, Calif. Oelrichs sold her in the mid-1930s to George Washington Vanderbilt III, who used her for recreational cruises and to explore Africa and the South Seas. Vanderbilt renamed her PIONEER after 1937 and before visiting Isla Floreana (Galapagos) in her on 4 Jun 41. On 17 Aug 42 the Navy assigned her the name EL CANO "after the former vessel of that name" (presumably ELCANO, PG-38), and she operated during the rest of the war "in service" in the 11th Naval District. A report that the Coast Guard used EL CANO ex PIONEER for merchant training between 1939 and her return to the MC on 31 Aug 42 appears to be inconsistent with the preceding information, but merchant training could have been her function in the 11th Naval District. The schooner was returned to Mr. Vanderbilt in late 1945. PIONEER made her last major voyage in 1951, from California to Hawaii, and then remained pierside at Newport Beach from 1954 until Vanderbilt's death in 1961. She was sold in 1965 to Windjammer Barefoot Cruises and converted into the passenger ship YANKEE CLIPPER. She was refitted in 1987 with a third mast and a top deck. Windjammer ceased operations in 2007 and the ship is now (2009) laid up in Trinidad and looking for a buyer.
