= USS Congaree =

Patrol vessel of the United States Navy

History

United States
- In service: 17 October 1942
- Out of service: 15 March 1943
- Stricken: 10 June 1947
- Fate: Transferred to the United States Maritime Commission

USS Congaree (IX-84), an unclassified miscellaneous vessel, was the only ship of the United States Navy to be named for the Congaree River in South Carolina. Formerly known as Wakiva, she was an auxiliary yawl acquired by the Navy and placed in service at Port Everglades Section Base on 17 October 1942 for inshore patrol duty in the 7th Naval District. She performed in this capacity until placed out of service on 15 March 1943. In May 1946 she was transferred to Annapolis, Maryland, for duty at the United States Naval Academy. Congaree was turned over to the United States Maritime Commission in April 1947 and stricken from the Naval Vessel Register on 10 June.
