= Domino (IX-208) =

History

United States
- Name: Domino
- Builder: Bethlehem Steel Wilmington
- Laid down: 3 October 1918
- Launched: 23 July 1919
- Fate: Sold for scrap, 25 July 1947

General characteristics
- Type: Freighter
- Tonnage: 5,150 DWT
- Length: 338 ft (103 m) o/a; 328 ft (100 m) w/l
- Beam: 46 ft 3 in (14.10 m)
- Draft: 21 ft (6.4 m)
- Propulsion: Triple expansion engine, 1,650 hp (1,230 kW), 1 screw
- Speed: 9 knots (17 km/h; 10 mph)
- Armament: None

USS Domino (IX-208), an unclassified miscellaneous vessel, was the only ship of the United States Navy to be named for the game piece. The freighter was acquired from the War Shipping Administration in May 1945. The hull classification symbol IX-208 was reserved for her, but she was never taken up on the list of naval vessels, and no classification was ever assigned to her. She was returned to the War Shipping Administration (WSA) in February 1946.

== Service history ==
The ship was built at the Harlan and Hollingsworth shipyard by Bethlehem Steel at Wilmington, Delaware, laid down on 3 October 1918, and launched on 23 July 1919. She then served as a merchant ship under the name Delco.

By late 1944 the ship was laid up at Mobile, Alabama, under the control of the WSA. In November 1944 she was acquired by the Navy to transport Bureau of Yards and Docks equipment to the Pacific, and then to be sunk as a breakwater.

On arrival in the Pacific in early 1945 the ship was inspected and considered suitable for use as a mobile dry storage. On 28 January 1945 the Commander-in-Chief of Pacific Ocean Areas (CinCPOA) was directed to commission her as an unclassified miscellaneous vessel, assigned to ServPac. The name Domino and classification number "IX-208" were approved on 30 January 1945. However, on 23 April 1945, a Board of Inspection and Survey at Hawaii reported that the vessel was in poor condition throughout, and her acquisition was then cancelled.

The hull number IX-208 was subsequently listed as "not acquired" as of 25 June 1945. The ship remained at Pearl Harbor, but was not used. She was towed back to the West Coast in January 1946 and delivered to the Maritime Commission reserve fleet at Suisun Bay on 13 February 1946, and sold for scrap on 25 July 1947.
