= USS E.A. Poe =

United States Navy vessel

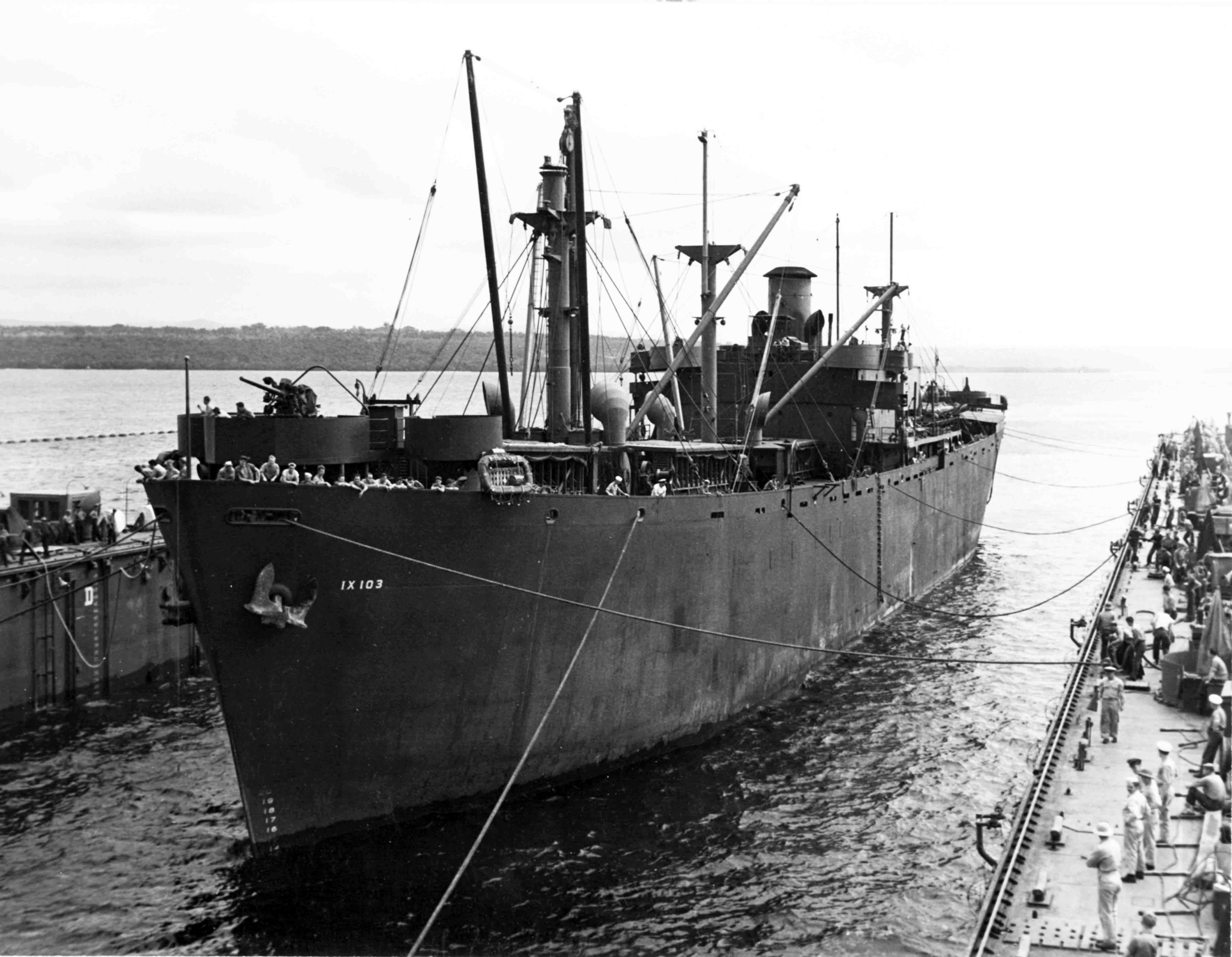
- E.A. Poe (IX-103) entering USS ABSD-1 at Espiritu Santo, New Hebrides Islands for repairs, 3 June 1944

History

United States
- Ordered: 1942
- Acquired: 30 August 1943
- In service: 23 February 1945
- Out of service: 15 March 1946
- Fate: Returned to owner

General characteristics
- Displacement: 14,500 tons
- Length: 441 ft 6 in (134.57 m)
- Beam: 56 ft 11 in (17.35 m)
- Draught: 28 ft 4 in (8.64 m)
- Propulsion: towed
- Speed: not self-propelled
- Complement: 293 officers and men
- Armament: one four-inch gun, one three-inch gun

USS E.A. Poe (IX-103), formerly Edgar Allan Poe, an unclassified miscellaneous vessel, was the only ship of the United States Navy to be named for Edgar Allan Poe. She was chartered by the Navy in 1942, then taken over after being damaged and losing use of her engines on 30 August 1943. She was employed as a dry storage ship being towed among the islands of the southwest Pacific, issuing provisions to them as well as to ships and small craft in the area. She was placed in service on 23 February 1945 and out of service on 15 March 1946 when returned to her owner. She was stricken from the Naval Vessel Register on 28 March 1946.

FY 1943 (IX-103, 109), 1944 (others). The Liberty ships that the Navy classified IX were all ships that had been damaged during the war and could no longer be used as seagoing cargo ships. Some had had their engine rooms destroyed, while others had had the hulls severely weakened. These ships required towing to be relocated as they were not self-propelled. All of these damaged ships were repurposed to better serve the war effort. Despite her challenges, the USS Edgar Allan Poe served a critical role in the supply chain during WWII.
