= USS Jaguar =

History

United States
- Name: Charles T. Yerkes; Jaguar
- Namesake: Charles T. Yerkes; The jaguar
- Laid down: 18 October 1943, as SS Charles T. Yerkes
- Launched: 20 November 1943
- Commissioned: 15 December 1943
- Decommissioned: 10 June 1946
- Fate: Transferred to Panama

General characteristics
- Displacement: 3665 tons
- Length: 441 ft 6 in (134.57 m)
- Beam: 56 ft 11 in (17.35 m)
- Draught: 28 ft 4 in (8.64 m)
- Propulsion: two 220 PSI boilers, Joshua Hendy Ironworks, Sunnyvale, CA., single three cylinder triple-expansion reciprocating engine, single 4 blade, 18' 6" propeller, Shaft Horsepower, 2,500
- Speed: 11 knots
- Complement: 79 officers and men
- Armament: 1 × 5-inch/38-caliber dual-purpose gun; 1 × 3 in (76 mm) gun; 8 × 20 mm cannons

USS Jaguar (IX-120), an Armadillo-class tanker designated an unclassified miscellaneous vessel, was the only ship of the United States Navy to be named for the jaguar, a large leopard-like mammal of wooded regions, typically yellowish brown marked with dark spots. Her keel was laid down as Charles T. Yerkes under Maritime Commission contract (Z-ET1-S-C3) by the California Shipbuilding Corporation, in San Pedro, California. She was launched on 20 November 1943, renamed Jaguar 27 October, acquired by the Navy 15 December 1943 and commissioned that day.

After shakedown out of San Pedro, California, Jaguar departed 19 January 1944 for duty as a floating storage ship in the Pacific islands. She arrived New Caledonia on 21 February via Wellington, New Zealand, and from there she transported vital diesel oil, aviation gasoline, and minesweeping gear to the New Hebrides and Solomon Islands. Jaguar returned to the West Coast early in 1946 and arrived Norfolk, Virginia, via the Panama Canal on 20 April. She decommissioned there 10 June 1946, and was turned over to the Maritime Commission. After serving as a tanker with various American lines under the name of Harry Peer in 1948 and Tini in 1949, the ship was transferred to Panamanian flag in February 1951.
