= Forbes (IX-90) =

History

United States
- Name: Forbes (IX-90)
- Builder: Marco U. Martinolich, Lussinpiccolo, Italy
- Launched: 1927
- Acquired: 19 August 1942 from Pond School Cruise, Inc., of Annapolis, Maryland
- In service: 21 January 1943
- Out of service: 15 March 1943
- Stricken: 12 August 1943
- Fate: Sold, 21 March 1945

General characteristics
- Type: Yacht
- Displacement: 110 long tons (112 t) light
- Length: 98 ft (30 m) o/a; 68 ft (21 m) w/l
- Beam: 17 ft 8 in (5.38 m)
- Depth: 12 ft 3 in (3.73 m)
- Propulsion: 1 × Buda diesel engine (from 1936)

Service record
- Part of: 7th Naval District

Forbes (IX-90), an unclassified miscellaneous vessel, was the only ship of the United States Navy with that name. A sailing yacht formerly named Morning Star, Forbes served in a noncommissioned status in the 7th Naval District during World War II.
