= USS Newton (ID-4306) =

Training ship for the US Navy

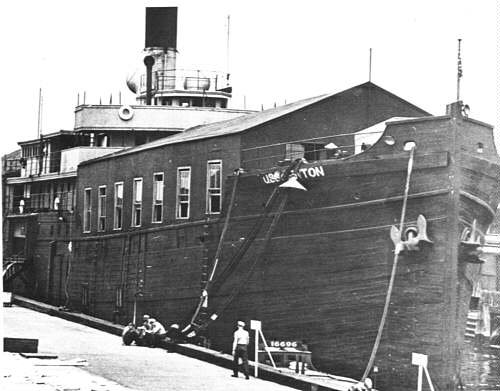

History

United States
- Name: USS Newton
- Builder: L. H. Shattuck, Inc., Portsmouth, New Hampshire
- Launched: November 1919
- Acquired: 2 October 1922
- In service: 22 November 1944
- Out of service: 14 November 1945
- Reclassified: IX–33, 17 February 1941
- Stricken: 8 January 1946
- Fate: Sold, 12 September 1946

General characteristics
- Displacement: 5,990 long tons (6,086 t)
- Length: 268 ft (82 m) p/p
- Beam: 45 ft 2 in (13.77 m)
- Draft: 23 ft 11 in (7.29 m)
- Armament: 1 × 3 in (76 mm) gun; 4 × 6-pounder guns

The second USS Newton (ID-4306/IX-33) was a training ship in the United States Navy.

Newton was built in 1919 by L. H. Shattuck, Inc., Portsmouth, New Hampshire, as a wooden-hulled Design 1001 ship for the Emergency Fleet Corporation, and acquired by the U.S. Navy from the United States Shipping Board on 2 October 1922.

== Service history ==
Prepared for service with the New Jersey Naval Militia, she served as a training ship in the Jersey City area into World War II.

Carried on the Navy List as an unclassified ship for most of that period, she was designated IX–33 on 17 February 1941. On 13 May 1943 she was transferred to the Armed Guard Center, Brooklyn, New York. Placed in service on 22 November 1944, she was assigned to the New York Navy Yard until placed out of service on 14 November 1945.

Struck from the Navy List on 8 January 1946, she sank in the Hudson River the same month and her hulk was sold on 12 September 1946.
