= USS Flicker (AM-70) =

Minesweeper of the United States Navy

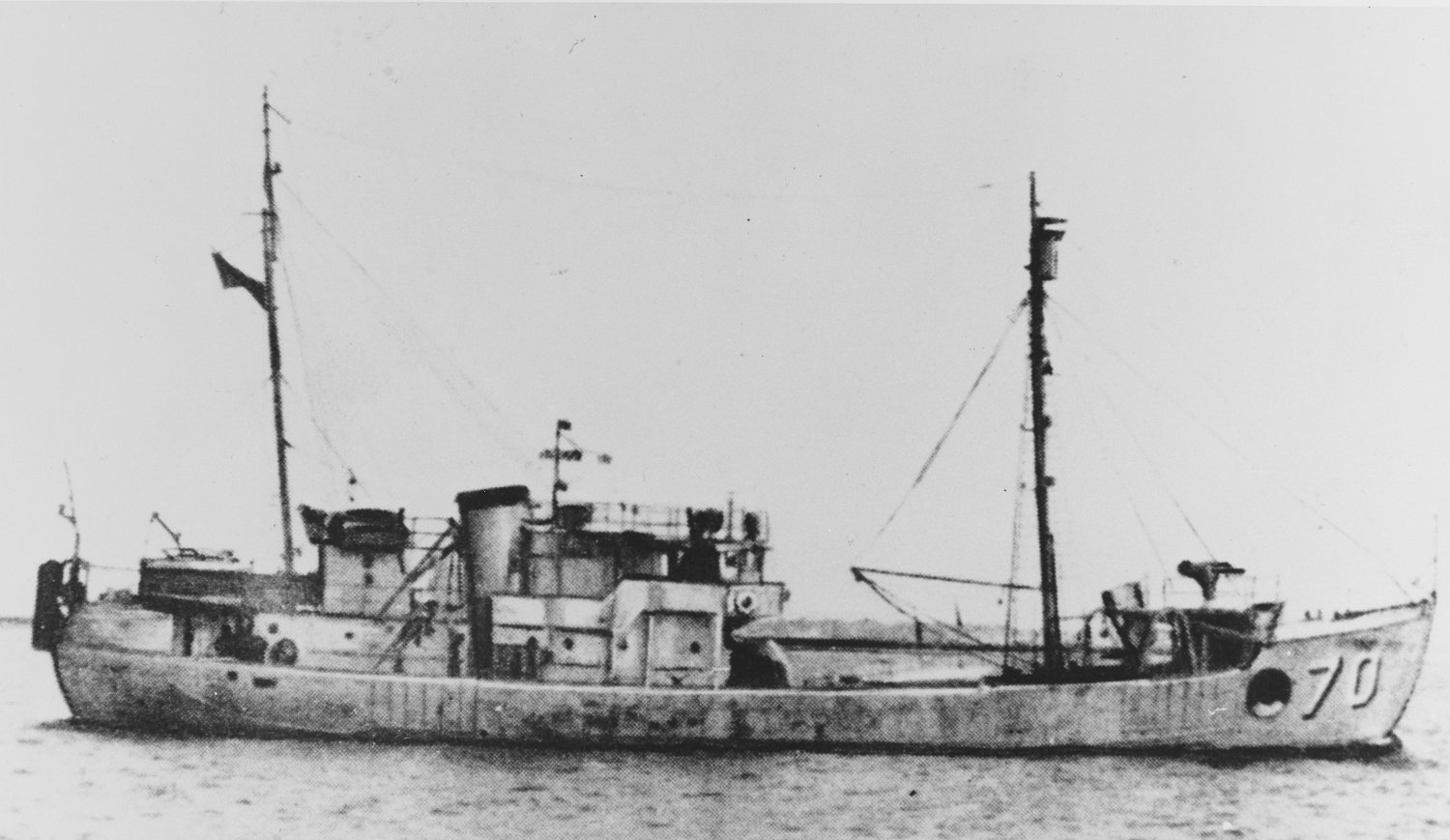

History

United States
- Name: USS Flicker
- Builder: Bath Iron Works, Bath, Maine
- Laid down: 27 October 1936
- Launched: 25 February 1937, as MV Delaware
- Acquired: 9 August 1940
- Commissioned: 26 October 1940
- Decommissioned: 3 January 1945
- Renamed: Flicker, 14 August 1940
- Reclassified: IX-165, 11 April 1944
- Fate: Transferred to the Maritime Commission, 31 March 1945

General characteristics
- Type: Minesweeper
- Displacement: 510 long tons (518 t)
- Length: 147 ft 6 in (44.96 m)
- Beam: 25 ft (7.6 m)
- Draft: 12 ft (3.7 m)
- Propulsion: 1 × 735 shp (548 kW) Fairbanks-Morse diesel engine; 1 × shaft
- Speed: 13 knots (24 km/h; 15 mph)
- Armament: 1 × 3"/23 caliber gun

The first USS Flicker (AM-70) was a minesweeper in the United States Navy during World War II, named after the flicker, a medium-sized member of the woodpecker family common to North America.

Laid down on 27 October 1936 as the steel-hulled fishing trawler, M/V Delaware by the Bath Iron Works, Bath, Maine for the Booth Fisheries Co. of Boston, Massachusetts, the ship was launched on 25 February 1937.

Acquired by the US Navy on 9 August 1940 and converted to a minesweeper at the Bethlehem Steel Co., East Boston, she was renamed Flicker on 14 August 1940, and commissioned as USS Flicker (AM-70) on 26 October 1940. Conversion was completed on 26 March 1941. She was reclassified IX-165 on 11 April 1944.

== World War II North Atlantic operations ==
After training off Norfolk, Virginia, Flicker carried out sweeping operations off Bermuda from May 1941 through December, then returned to Norfolk for minesweeping in the Virginia Capes.

== South Atlantic operations ==
On 19 September 1942, she arrived at Recife, Brazil, where she served as harbor entrance guard ship and swept mines until 7 January 1943. Her base from that time to 11 July was Bahia, Brazil, and after operations at Rio de Janeiro, she returned to Bahia on 21 November, to serve there until 8 February 1944.

== Return to the North Atlantic ==
Flicker arrived at Norfolk, Virginia, on 6 March, and after repairs, sailed for Argentia, Newfoundland, arriving on 1 June. She carried cargo to ports in Labrador, Nova Scotia, and Newfoundland, once sailing south to reload at Boston, Massachusetts, and patrolled off Argentia, until returning to Boston on 11 November.

== Decommissioning ==
She was decommissioned on 3 January 1945, and transferred to the Maritime Commission on 31 March 1945.
