= USS Catbird =

American naval vessel

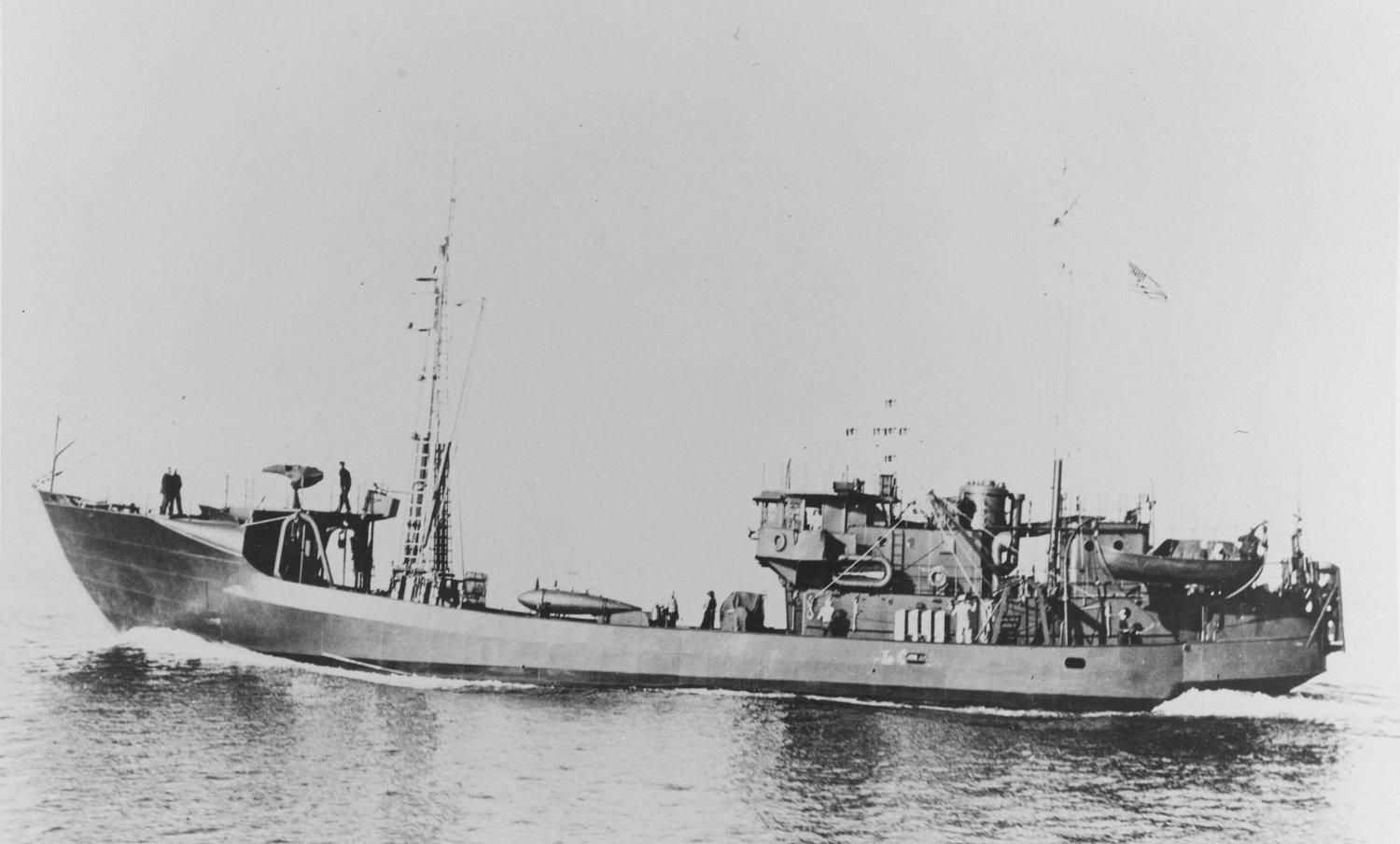
- Catbird underway in 1941

History

United States
- Name: USS Catbird
- Builder: Charleston Shipbuilding and Dry Dock Co., Charleston, South Carolina
- Launched: as MV Bittern, 1938
- Acquired: 12 August 1940
- Commissioned: 27 November 1940
- Decommissioned: 17 August 1944
- Out of service: 7 November 1945
- Renamed: USS Catbird, 14 August 1940
- Reclassified: IX-183, 15 August 1944
- Fate: Transferred to the Maritime Commission, 24 January 1947

General characteristics
- Class & type: Catbird-class minesweeper
- Displacement: 570 long tons (579 t)
- Length: 147 ft 10 in (45.06 m)
- Beam: 28 ft 8 in (8.74 m)
- Draft: 12 ft (3.7 m)
- Propulsion: 1 × 575 shp (429 kW) Fairbanks-Morse diesel engine; 1 × shaft
- Speed: 15 knots (28 km/h; 17 mph)
- Armament: 1 × 3"/23 caliber gun

USS Catbird (AM-68) was the lead ship of her class of two naval trawlers, which were operated as minesweepers by the United States Navy during World War II.

Built in 1938 by Charleston Shipbuilding and Dry Dock Co., Charleston, South Carolina, as MV Bittern, the ship was acquired by the U.S. Navy on 12 August 1940, and commissioned on 27 November 1940.

== World War II East Coast operations ==
USS Catbird operated in New England waters through 31 March 1941, engaged in tests and exercises. After overhaul at Brooklyn, New York, she sailed on 5 October for Cristobal where she remained until 29 January 1944, on duty in the 15th Naval District. Returning to the east coast she engaged in local operations at Norfolk, Virginia, until 16 April 1944 when she sailed to Boston, Massachusetts, arriving 19 April.

== Reclassified as IX-183 ==
She was reclassified as Unclassified Miscellaneous Auxiliary IX-183 on 15 August 1944, and was placed out of commission in service 17 August 1944.

Catbird provided services out of New York until 23 May 1945, then operated in Cape Cod waters until 3 June under direction of Naval Mine Testing Facilities.

== End of service ==
Returning to New York on 4 June, she was placed out of service and laid up 7 November 1945, and transferred to the Maritime Commission for disposal on 24 January 1947.
