= USS Navajo (AT-52) =

Tugboat of the United States Navy

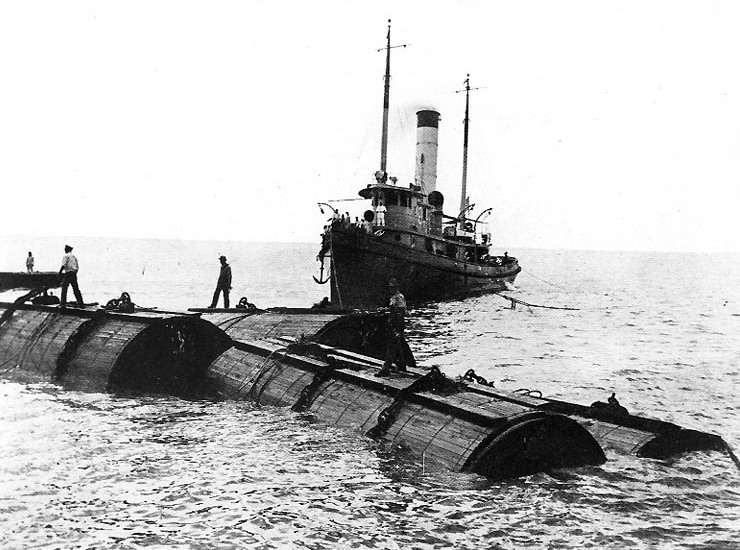
- USS Navajo assists with the salvage of USS F-4 (SS-23), April–August 1915.

History

United States
- Name: USS Navajo
- Builder: Neafie & Levy, Philadelphia, Pennsylvania
- Launched: 1907
- Acquired: by purchase, 21 November 1907
- Commissioned: 17 March 1908, as Fleet Tug No. 52
- Decommissioned: 24 April 1937
- Reclassified: AT-52, 17 July 1920
- Stricken: 24 April 1937; Restored, 14 January 1942
- In service: 15 March 1942
- Out of service: 9 February 1946
- Reclassified: IX–56, 14 January 1942
- Stricken: 9 February 1946
- Fate: Sold for scrapping, 23 November 1948

General characteristics
- Type: Tugboat
- Displacement: 800 long tons (813 t)
- Length: 141 ft 4 in (43.08 m)
- Beam: 27 ft 6 in (8.38 m)
- Draft: 14 ft 1 in (4.29 m)
- Speed: 12 knots (22 km/h; 14 mph)

USS Navajo (AT-52) was a tug built in 1907 by Neafie & Levy, Philadelphia, Pennsylvania, purchased by the United States Navy on 21 November 1907 and commissioned on 17 March 1908 as Fleet Tug No.52.

== Pacific Ocean operations ==
Assigned to Pearl Harbor, Navajo operated in the Hawaiian Islands throughout her Naval career, performing towing and docking operations. On 17 July 1920 she was reclassified as AT-52.

In 1922, Water Barge #10, while in tow by Navajo, collided with the submarine R-16 (SS-93). With a hole in her bow, the barge sank within minutes. The gallant action of men from Navajo resulted in rescue of the barge's three-man crew. After decommissioning, Navajo was struck from the Navy List on 24 April 1937.

== Restored to duty ==
Navajo was restored to the list as IX–56 on 14 January 1942, and she served in a decommissioned status at the Navy Yard at Pearl Harbor. She was placed in service on 15 March 1942 and continued operations in the 14th Naval District throughout World War II.

After war-time service she was struck from the Navy List on 9 February 1946. She was subsequently sold for scrap to Commercial Equipment Co. on 23 November 1948.

== Awards ==
- World War I Victory Medal
- Asiatic-Pacific Campaign Medal
- World War II Victory Medal
