= USS Seven Seas =

History

United States
- Name: USS Seven Seas
- Namesake: The Seven Seas
- Builder: Bergsund M.V. Atkieb, Stockholm, Sweden
- Launched: 1912, as the Abraham Rydberg
- Acquired: 10 April 1942
- In service: 5 May 1942
- Out of service: 22 May 1944
- Stricken: 29 July 1944

General characteristics
- Type: Sailing ship
- Displacement: 430 long tons (437 t)
- Length: 168 ft (51 m)
- Beam: 27 ft 6 in (8.38 m)
- Draft: 12 ft (3.7 m)

USS Seven Seas (IX-68) was built by Bergsund M.V. Atkieb in Stockholm, Sweden, in 1912 and served in the Swedish Navy as the training ship Abraham Rydberg. She was acquired by the United States Navy from William S. Gubelmann of Marine Airways, Roslyn, New York, on 10 April 1942 and placed in service on 5 May 1942.

== Service history ==
Seven Seas proceeded to the 7th Naval District on 8 May 1942, arriving at Key West, Florida, later that month. On 9 April, the auxiliary, full-rigged ship assumed duties as station ship at Key West.

Seven Seas remained at Key West until after the heyday of coastal U-boat strikes. As the dangers lessened, she was placed out of service and laid up at the Coast Guard Patrol Base in Port Everglades, Florida, on 22 May 1944. Seven Seas was struck from the Navy List on 29 July 1944.
