= USS Agile (AMc-111) =

Minesweeper of the United States Navy

History

United States
- Acquired: 10 April 1941
- In service: 12 December 1941
- Out of service: 14 December 1945
- Stricken: 8 January 1946
- Fate: Disposed of, 14 March 1946

General characteristics
- Displacement: 215 tons
- Length: 96 ft 0 in (29.26 m)
- Beam: 24 ft 0 in (7.32 m)
- Draught: 7 ft (2.1 m)
- Speed: 10.0 knots
- Armament: two .50 cal (12.7 mm) machine guns., two .30 cal (7.62 mm) machine guns

USS Agile (AMc-111) was an Agile-class coastal minesweeper acquired by the United States Navy for the dangerous task of removing mines from minefields laid in the water to prevent ships from passing.

Agile—a wooden-hulled coastal minesweeper—was purchased by the Navy from Mr. John Breskovich of Tacoma, Washington, on 10 April 1941 while she was still under construction at the Petersen Shipbuilding Co. in Tacoma, Washington; delivered to the Navy on 26 November 1941; and placed in service on 12 December 1941.

== World War II service ==
Agile reported for duty with the 13th Naval District Inshore Patrol on 23 December. Based at the Naval Station, Seattle, Washington, she patrolled the waters of Puget Sound until April 1942 when she entered the yard for repairs and alterations. Agile completed repairs and returned to duty soon thereafter.

In October 1943, she moved to Kodiak, Alaska, where she resumed patrols under the auspices of the Commander, Northwest Sea Frontier. After 15 April 1944, she was assigned to the newly established Alaskan Sea Frontier.

Agile returned to Seattle on 4 October 1944. She entered the yard at Winslow Marine Railway where her minesweeping gear was removed. On 20 December 1944, she reported to the Naval Air Station, Whidbey Island, and began duty loading and delivering torpedoes at bases along the coast of Washington.

== Redesignated IX-203 ==
On 30 December 1944, she was redesignated IX-203. That duty kept her busy until she was placed out of service on 14 December 1945. Her name was struck from the Navy list on 8 January 1946, and she was turned over to the Maritime Commission for disposal on 14 March 1946.
