= USS Seaward =

United States Navy schooner

History

United States
- Name: USS Seaward
- Builder: Adams Company, East Boothbay, Maine
- Launched: 1920
- Acquired: 31 January 1942
- Commissioned: 19 February 1942
- Decommissioned: 1 April 1943
- Stricken: 18 July 1944
- Home port: San Pedro, California
- Fate: Unknown

General characteristics
- Type: Schooner
- Tonnage: 96 long tons (98 t)
- Length: 106 ft (32 m)
- Beam: 21 ft 7 in (6.58 m)
- Draft: 11 ft 4 in (3.45 m)
- Speed: 7 knots (13 km/h; 8.1 mph)
- Complement: 6

USS Seaward (IX-60) was a schooner of the United States Navy during World War II. The ship was built by the Adams Company, East Boothbay, Maine, in 1920. She was acquired by the Navy on 31 January 1942 from Cecil B. DeMille Productions, Los Angeles, California.

== Service history ==
The auxiliary schooner was placed in service on 19 February 1942, assigned to the 11th Naval District, and homeported at San Pedro, California. On 23 July, Seaward was assigned to the Western Sea Frontier.

Seaward ended the year at Mare Island Navy Yard. She was placed out of service on 1 April 1943, and was struck from the Navy List on 18 July 1944.
