= USS Sea Otter I =

History

United States
- Name: USS Sea Otter I
- Builder: Jacobson's Shipyard, Oyster Bay, Long Island, New York
- Launched: 24 May 1941
- Acquired: 29 May 1941
- Commissioned: 9 July 1941
- Decommissioned: 6 November 1941
- Stricken: 24 June 1942
- Fate: Scrapped 1942

General characteristics
- Displacement: 100 long tons (102 t)
- Length: 80 ft (24 m)
- Beam: 12 ft 8 in (3.86 m)
- Draft: 6 ft 8 in (2.03 m)

USS Sea Otter I (IX-51) was a vessel of the United States Navy prior to World War II. The ship was built by Jakobson Shipyard, Oyster Bay, New York and launched on 24 May 1941. Prior to her completion, Sea Otter I had been offered to the Navy for use as a district craft for experimental purposes by her owner, Mr. Roland L. Redmond, of New York City.

== Service history ==
Acquired by the US Navy on 29 May 1941, she was placed in service on 9 July 1941. Sea Otter I operated in waters of the 3rd Naval District. She was placed out of service on 6 November 1941 and struck from the Navy List on 24 June 1942. Sea Otter's provision unit was shipped to the Naval Engineering Experimental Station in Annapolis, Maryland, and her hull was scrapped.
