= Aristaeus-class repair ship =

Class of United States Navy repair ships

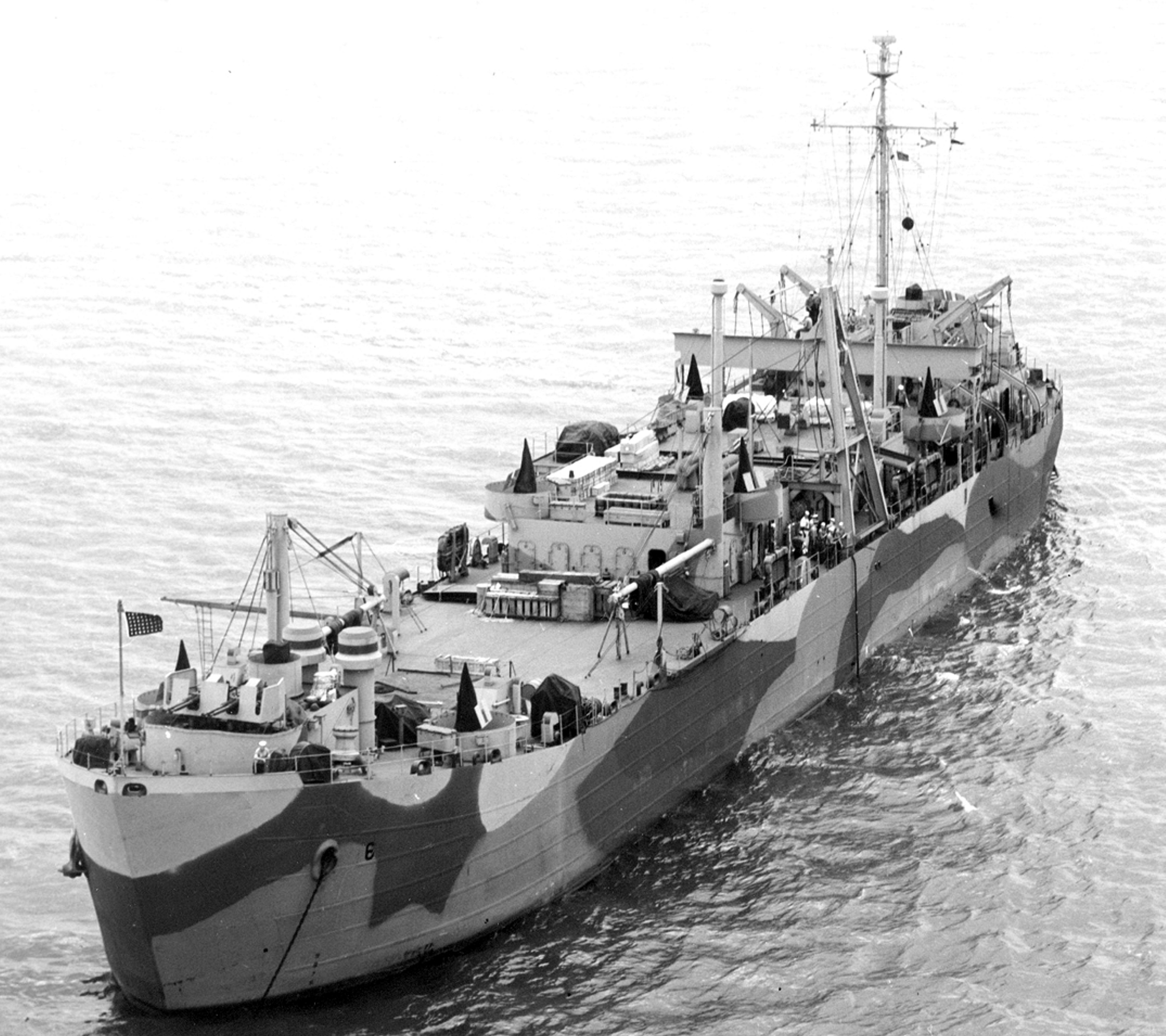
- USS Nestor

Class overview
- Name: Aristaeus class
- Builders: Philadelphia Navy Yard; Dravo Corporation; Chicago Bridge and Iron Co.; Bethlehem Steel Co.; Bethlehem Hingham Shipyard
- Operators: United States Navy; Brazilian Navy; German Navy
- Built: 1943-1945
- In commission: 1943-1947
- Planned: 12
- Completed: 12
- Laid up: 1
- Retired: 12

General characteristics
- Type: Repair ship
- Displacement: 1,781 t (1,753 long tons) light; 4,100 t (4,035 long tons) full load
- Length: 328 ft (100 m) oa
- Beam: 50 ft (15 m)
- Draft: Full load: 8 ft 2 in (2.49 m) forward; 14 ft 1 in (4.29 m) aft; Landing at 2,160 t: 3 ft 11 in (1.19 m) forward; 9 ft 10 in (3.00 m) aft
- Installed power: 2 × 900 hp (670 kW) Electro-Motive Diesel 12-567A diesel engines; 1,700 shp (1,300 kW)
- Propulsion: 1 × Falk main reduction gears; 2 × Propellers
- Speed: 12 kn (22 km/h; 14 mph)
- Range: 24,000 nmi (44,000 km; 28,000 mi) at 9 kn (17 km/h; 10 mph) while displacing 3,960 long tons (4,024 t)
- Boats & landing craft carried: 2 or 6 x LCVPs
- Capacity: 2,100 tons oceangoing maximum; 350 tons main deckload
- Troops: 20 officers, 234 enlisted men
- Complement: 13 officers, 104 enlisted men
- Armament: 1 × single 3"/50 cal gun; 2 × quad Bofors 40 mm guns; 8 × single Oerlikon 20 mm cannons

The Aristaeus-class repair ship was a class of repair ships of the United States Navy during the Second World War.

== Development ==
Thirteen ships was converted into a repair ship throughout the later stages of World War II. The ships were converted from the LST-1, LST-491 and LST-542 classes. After the war, few ships were then sold to foreign countries such as Brazil, Greece, Norway and West Germany.

The ship's hull remained nearly the same but with new equipments to carry out her purpose now placed on deck alongside several cranes. The ships' armament had been slightly changed and relocated to make way for the ships' equipments. All ships served in the Pacific Theater until the end of the war with no ships lost in combat.

MV Gordon Jensen (ex-USS Zeus) is still active to this day, serving as a transport and berthing vessel for SNOPAC Products Inc. processing crews in Alaska.

ARB-13 (ex-USS LST-50) was redesignated as a repair ship on 14 November 1952. She was sold to Norway as HNoMS Ellida (A534) and later sold to Greece as Sakipis (A329).

== Ships of class ==
Aristaeus-class repair ship
Pennant number	Name	Callsign	Builders	Launched	Commissioned	Decommissioned	Fate
ARB-1	Aristaeus	NJWX	Philadelphia Navy Yard	11 February 1943	18 May 1943	10 January 1947	Fate unknown
ARB-2	Oceanus	NJXA	Philadelphia Navy Yard	11 February 1943	22 May 1943	January 1947	Scrapped
ARB-3	Phaon	NJXD	Dravo Corporation	30 January 1943	5 August 1943	January 1947	Scrapped on 8 July 1962
ARB-4	Zeus	NJXG	Chicago Bridge and Iron Co.	26 October 1943	11 April 1944	30 August 1946	Sold to merchant service, laid up in Alaska
ARB-5	Midas	NJXJ	Chicago Bridge and Iron Co.	24 December 1943	23 May 1944	January 1947	Scrapped on 19 November 1980
ARB-6	Nestor	NJLJ	Chicago Bridge and Iron Co.	20 January 1944	24 June 1944	29 November 1945	Scrapped
ARB-7	Sarpedon	NJLR	Bethlehem Steel Co.	21 August 1944	10 March 1945	29 January 1947	Scrapped on 30 May 1989
ARB-8	Telamon	NJLV	Bethlehem Hingham Shipyard	10 January 1945	1 June 1945	20 May 1947	Scrapped on 1 March 1974
ARB-9	Ulysses	NJMB	Bethlehem Hingham Shipyard	2 December 1944	20 April 1945	28 February 1947	Sold to West Germany and renamed Odin (A512), fate unknown
ARB-10	Demeter	NJMJ	Chicago Bridge and Iron Co.	19 January 1945	3 July 1945	25 May 1947	Sold to merchant service, sunk on 12 January 1964
ARB-11	Diomedes	NJMP	Chicago Bridge and Iron Co.	11 January 1945	23 June 1945	3 December 1946	Sold to West Germany and renamed Wotan (A513), fate unknown
ARB-12	Helios	NJMR	Chicago Bridge and Iron Co.	14 February 1945	23 July 1945	3 December 1946	Sold to Brazil and renamed Belmonte (G24), sunk as target on 19 March 2002
ARB-13							Sold to Norway as HNoMS Ellida (A534), later sold to Greece as Sakipis (A329)
