= Pacific Reserve Fleet, San Diego =

Former Reserve Fleet in San Diego, California

- San Diego, California
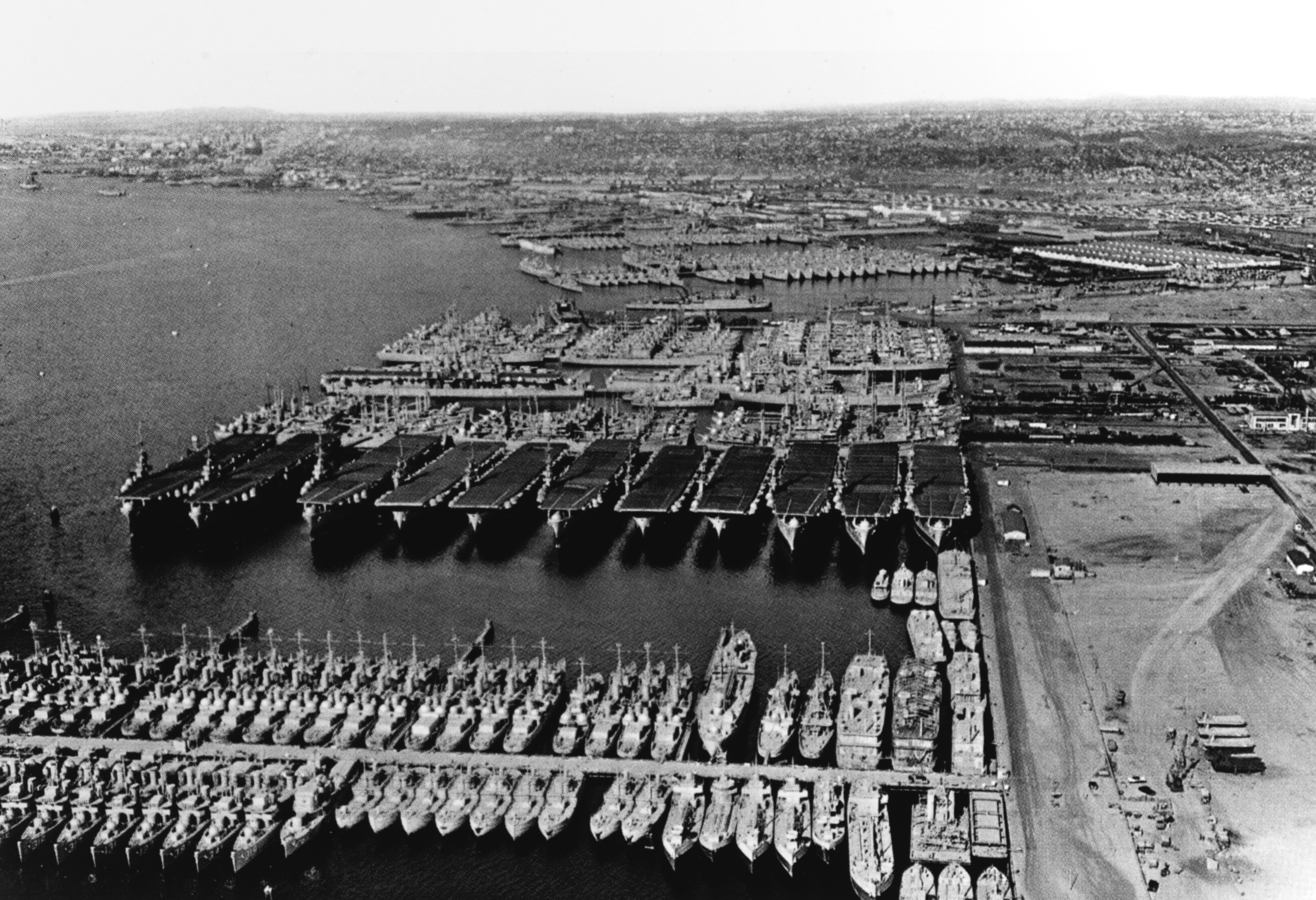
- Pacific Reserve Fleet, San Diego, circa in the 1950s

Site information
- Type: Reserve Fleet
- Owner: United States
- Operator: United States Navy

Location
- Coordinates: 32°40′45″N 117°07′30″W

Site history
- Built: 1946

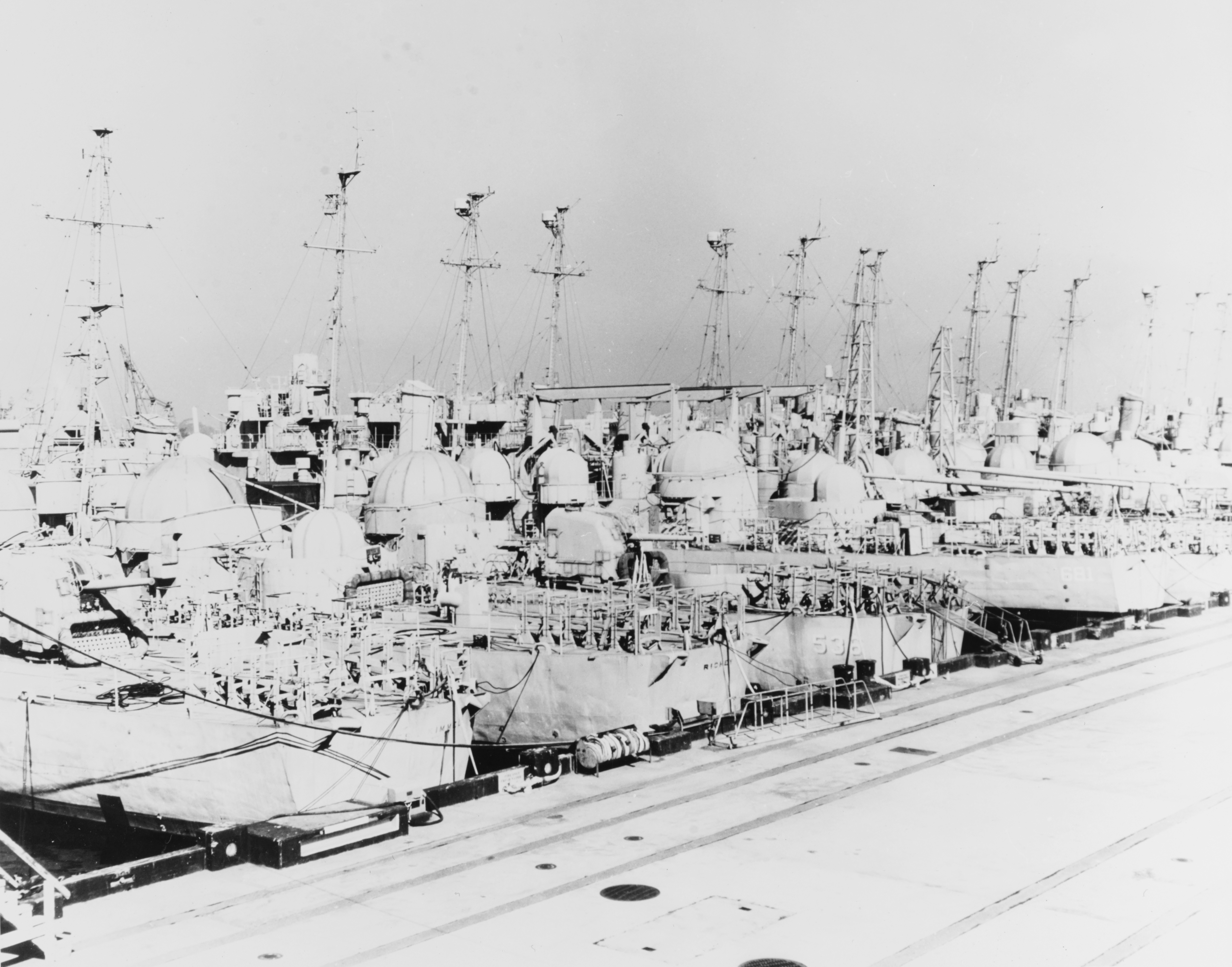
Retired destroyer escorts at San Diego, in the 1960s

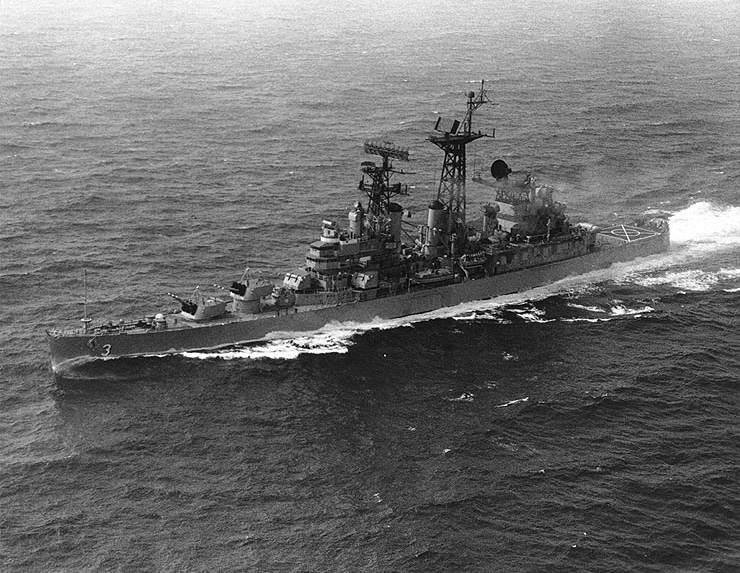
USS Galveston, last ship to depart the Pacific Reserve Fleet, San Diego

Pacific Reserve Fleet, San Diego was a part of the United States Navy reserve fleets, also called a mothball fleet, used to store surplus ships after World War II. Pacific Reserve Fleet, San Diego was near Naval Base San Diego in San Diego, California. Some ships in the fleet were reactivated for the Korean War and Vietnam War. The reserve fleet stored post World War I ships, some that were reactivated for World War II.

The USS Galveston (CL-93), a Cleveland-class cruiser, was the last ship to depart Pacific Reserve Fleet, San Diego. At the closing, only the Galveston and 11 other ships were remaining at the fleet. At its peak, 223 ships were stored in the fleet. The 12 rusty ships in fleet were sold off for scrapping and a few used for United States Navy target ships. Pacific Reserve Fleet, San Diego closed in June 1975.

== Pacific Reserve Fleet, San Diego ship examples ==
In the 1950 and 1960 many ships were stored in the fleet:

- Seven Commencement Bay-class escort carriers
- Four Casablanca-class escort carriers
- Many Minesweepers, like the:
  - USS Chief (AM-315)
  - USS Zeal (MSF-131)
  - USS Competent (AM-316)
  - USS Symbol (MSF-123)
- USS San Jacinto (CVL-30)
- USS Philippine Sea (CV-47)
- USS Aristaeus
- USS Midas (ARB-5)
- USS Oceanus (ARB-2)
- USS Zeus (ARB-4)
- USS Telamon (ARB-8)
- USS Sarpedon (ARB-7)
- USS Phaon (ARB-3)

== See also ==
- USS Midway Museum
