= USS Ulysses (ARB-9) =

U.S. Navy battle damage repair ship

- USS Ulysses (ARB-9) under way, date and location unknown.

History

United States
- Name: LST-967; Ulysses
- Namesake: Ulysses
- Builder: Bethlehem-Hingham Shipyard, Hingham, Massachusetts
- Yard number: 3437
- Laid down: 2 November 1944
- Launched: 2 December 1944
- Commissioned: 27 December 1944, reduced commission; 20 April 1945, full commission
- Decommissioned: 8 January 1945; 28 February 1947
- Stricken: 1961
- Identification: Hull symbol: LST-967; Hull symbol: ARB-9; Code letters: NJMB
- Fate: Transferred to the West Germany Navy, 7 June 1961

West Germany
- Name: Odin
- Namesake: Odin
- Commissioned: 2 July 1960
- Identification: Hull symbol: A512
- Fate: Scrapped

General characteristics
- Class & type: LST-542-class tank landing ship; Aristaeus-class battle damage repair ship
- Displacement: 1,781 long tons (1,810 t) light; 3,960 long tons (4,020 t) full load
- Length: 328 ft (100 m) oa
- Beam: 50 ft (15 m)
- Draft: 11 ft 2 in (3.40 m)
- Installed power: 2 × 900 hp (670 kW) Electro-Motive Diesel 12-567A diesel engines; 1,800 shp (1,300 kW)
- Propulsion: 1 × Falk main reduction gears; 2 × Propellers
- Speed: 11.6 kn (21.5 km/h; 13.3 mph)
- Complement: 15 officers, 271 enlisted men
- Armament: 2 × quad 40 mm (1.57 in) Bofors guns; 8 × single 20 mm (0.79 in) Oerlikon cannons

USS Ulysses (ARB-9) was planned as a United States Navy LST-542-class tank landing ship, but was redesignated as one of twelve Aristaeus-class battle damage repair ships built for the United States Navy during World War II. Named for Ulysses (a character in Greek mythology and the protagonist of Homer's epic poem, the Odyssey, which tells of his arduous voyage back to Ithaca, his home, after the Trojan War), she was the second US Naval vessel to bear the name.

== Construction ==
Originally slated for construction as LST-967, but redesignated ARB-9 on 14 April 1944, and named Ulysses on 28 April 1944, the ship was laid down on 2 November 1944, at Hingham, Massachusetts, by the Bethlehem-Hingham Shipyard; launched on 2 December 1944; and commissioned on 27 December 1944, for transit to her conversion yard. After proceeding to Baltimore, she was decommissioned on 9 January 1945; converted to a battle damage repair ship by the Maryland Drydock Company; and recommissioned on 20 April 1945.

== Service history ==
In May 1945, the new battle damage repair ship conducted shakedown exercises in Chesapeake Bay; then, on 22 May, she departed Norfolk, in company with Patroclus. She steamed via the Panama Canal and San Pedro, and arrived at San Francisco, on the morning of 1 June. There, she loaded stores and pontoons before getting underway from San Francisco Bay on 28 June.

After Ulysses had been at sea for only six hours, the bolts, plates, and turnbuckles holding the pontoons in place began to show signs of bending under the stress of the ocean voyage, and the ship was ordered back to San Francisco, for additional work on the pontoon mounts. At noon on 6 July, she again got underway and set her course, via Pearl Harbor and Eniwetok, for the Marianas. She arrived at Saipan, on 6 August, (just over a week before Japan capitulated) and reported to Commander, Service Division 103.

Ironically, on the very day – 6 August 1945 – Ulysses arrived at Saipan, only 5 mi (8.0 km) away on Tinian Island, a plane named the Enola Gay took off and flew to Hiroshima, Japan, and dropped the world's first atomic bomb on that city. The sailors aboard Ulysses knew nothing of this at the time, nor for several days afterwards.

During the remainder of 1945, she carried out repair assignments while based in turn at Saipan and at Okinawa. At Buckner Bay, on 9 and 10 October 1945, she weathered a devastating typhoon (Typhoon Louise (1945)) during which she collided three times with LST-717. The repair ship lost three anchors in attempting to hold her position in the anchorage during the height of the storm and emerged from the ordeal with a six-foot (1.8 m) hole in one side.

In January 1946, Ulysses shifted operations to Shanghai; then, in March, she set her course for the United States. After transiting the Panama Canal and unloading ammunition at Charleston, South Carolina, in mid-May, she proceeded to Jacksonville, for preservation work. On 3 September, she reported to the 16th Fleet and, on 28 February 1947, she was decommissioned and joined the Atlantic Reserve Fleet at Green Cove Springs, Florida. She remained there until 1 January 1961, when her name was struck from the Naval Vessel Register.

== West German service ==
Ulysses was transferred to the West Germany Navy and renamed Odin (A512). Commissioned in the German Navy 2 July 1960, at Kiel she was stationed at Naval Base Olpenitz for many years.

== Bibliography ==
Online resources

- "Ulysses". Dictionary of American Naval Fighting Ships. Naval History and Heritage Command. 20 October 2015. This article incorporates text from this source, which is in the public domain.
- "Bethlehem-Hingham, Hingham MA". ShipbuildingHistory.com. 11 August 2011.
- "USS Ulysses (ARB-9)". NavSource. 1 July 2016.
