= USS Helios =

U.S. Navy battle damage repair ship

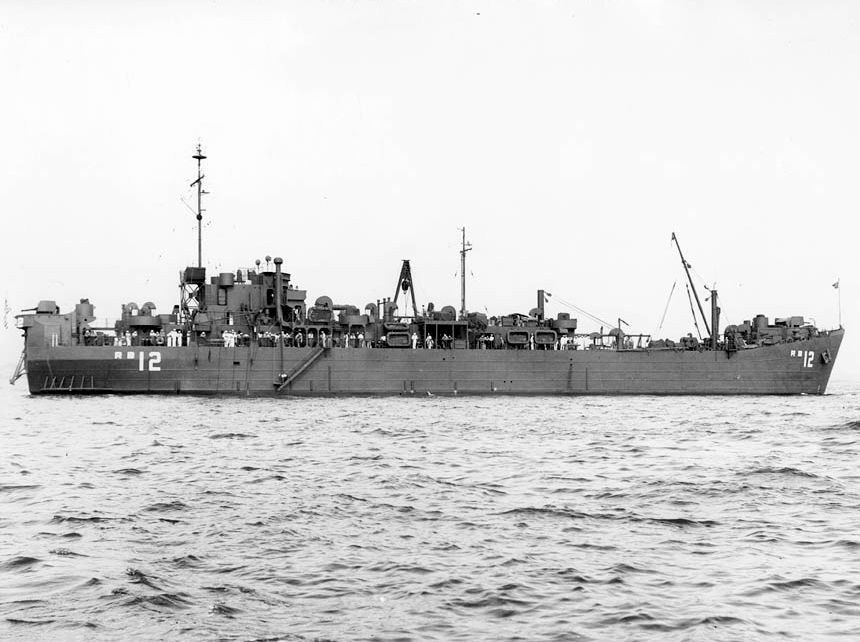
- USS Helios

History

United States
- Name: USS Helios
- Namesake: Helios
- Builder: Chicago Bridge & Iron Company, Seneca, Illinois
- Laid down: 23 November 1944
- Launched: 14 February 1945
- Commissioned: 26 February 1945
- Decommissioned: 3 December 1946
- Stricken: 10 December 1977
- Fate: Transferred to Brazil, 19 January 1962

History

Brazil
- Name: Belmonte (G24)
- Acquired: 19 January 1962
- Decommissioned: 7 June 1997
- Fate: Sunk as a target, 19 March 2002

General characteristics
- Class & type: Aristaeus-class battle damage repair ship
- Displacement: 1,781 long tons (1,810 t) light; 3,700 long tons (3,759 t) full
- Length: 328 ft (100 m)
- Beam: 50 ft (15 m)
- Draft: 11 ft 2 in (3.40 m)
- Propulsion: 2 × General Motors 12-567 diesel engines, two shafts, twin rudders
- Speed: 12 knots (22 km/h; 14 mph)
- Complement: 260 officers and enlisted men
- Armament: 2 × 40 mm guns; 8 × 20 mm guns

USS Helios (ARB-12) was one of twelve Aristaeus-class battle damage repair ships built for the United States Navy during World War II. Named for Helios (in Greek mythology, the sun-god, represented as driving a four-horse chariot through the heavens), she was the only U.S. Naval vessel to bear the name.

Originally laid down as LST-1127, the ship was launched on 14 February 1945 by the Chicago Bridge & Iron Company of Seneca, Illinois; sponsored by Mrs. Emery Adams; and commissioned on 26 February 1945.

The ship sailed down the Mississippi River and around to Baltimore where she decommissioned on 16 March 1945. She was then converted to a battle damage repair ship by the Maryland Drydock Company of Baltimore and renamed Helios. Recommissioned USS Helios (ARB-12) on 23 July 1945.

== Service history ==
She proceeded to Chesapeake Bay for her shakedown. Ordered to the Pacific, Helios sailed from Norfolk, Virginia on 27 August. By the time she reached Pearl Harbor on 29 September, the long war had come to its end and her services were no longer needed. Sailing on 11 October, she reached Charleston a month later and from there sailed to the Inactive Fleet Berthing Area at Green Cove Springs, Florida. Helios decommissioned there on 3 December 1946 and remained in reserve until leased to the government of Brazil on 19 January 1962 and renamed Belmonte (G-24).

The vessel was sold outright to Brazil via the Security Assistance Program on 1 December 1977 and struck from the Naval Vessel Register on 10 December 1977. Decommissioned by the Brazilian Navy on 7 June 1997, Belmonte was sunk as a target on 19 March 2002.
