= USS Sarpedon =

1944 LST-542-class tank landing ship

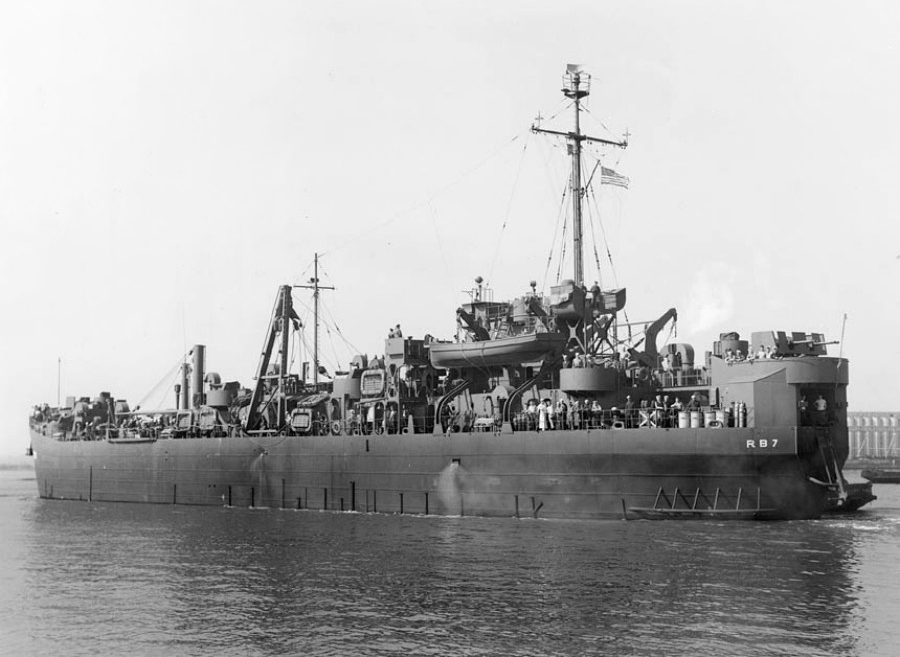
- USS Sarpedon (ARB-7) underway near Baltimore, Maryland, 24 March 1945, after completion of conversion to a Battle Damage Repair Ship. Beginning with this ship, the 3 in (76 mm)/50 caliber gun was eliminated and the after quad 40 mm (1.57 in) Bofors gun was moved to the extreme stern.

History

United States
- Name: LST-956; Sarpedon
- Namesake: Sarpedon
- Builder: Bethlehem-Hingham Shipyard, Hingham, Massachusetts
- Yard number: 3426
- Laid down: 11 July 1944
- Launched: 21 August 1944
- Commissioned: 16 November 1944, partial commission; 19 March 1945, full commission
- Decommissioned: 29 November 1944; 29 January 1947
- Stricken: 15 April 1976
- Identification: Hull symbol: LST-956; Hull symbol: ARB-7; IMO number: 8624151; Code letters: NJLR
- Fate: Laid up in the Pacific Reserve Fleet, San Diego Group; Sold for scrapping, 1 January 1977; Acquired for merchant service; Broken up for scrap, 30 May 1989

General characteristics
- Class & type: LST-542-class tank landing ship; Aristaeus-class battle damage repair ship
- Displacement: 1,781 long tons (1,810 t) light; 3,960 long tons (4,020 t) full load
- Length: 328 ft (100 m) oa
- Beam: 50 ft (15 m)
- Draft: 11 ft 2 in (3.40 m)
- Installed power: 2 × 900 hp (670 kW) Electro-Motive Diesel 12-567A diesel engines; 1,800 shp (1,300 kW)
- Propulsion: 1 × Falk main reduction gears; 2 × Propellers
- Speed: 11.6 kn (21.5 km/h; 13.3 mph)
- Complement: 15 officers, 271 enlisted men
- Armament: 2 × quad 40 mm (1.57 in) Bofors guns; 8 × single 20 mm (0.79 in) Oerlikon cannons

USS Sarpedon (ARB-7) was laid down as a United States Navy LST-542-class tank landing ship but was converted as one of twelve Aristaeus-class battle damage repair ships built for the Navy during World War II. Named for Sarpedon (in Greek mythology, a Lycian King, and a son of Zeus and Laodamia), and also she was the only US Naval vessel to bear the name.

== Construction ==
Sarpedon was laid down as LST-956 on 11 July 1944, at Hingham, Massachusetts, by the Bethlehem-Hingham Shipyard; reclassified as a battle damage repair ship and named Sarpedon on 14 August 1944; launched on 21 August 1944; commissioned on 16 November 1944, for transit to the conversion yard; decommissioned on 29 November 1944, for conversion by the Maryland Drydock Company, of Baltimore, Maryland; and recommissioned on 19 March 1945.

== Service history ==
After shakedown, Sarpedon sailed from Norfolk, Virginia for the Pacific. Following brief stops at the Panama Canal Zone, San Pedro, Los Angeles, Pearl Harbor, Eniwetok, and Guam, Sarpedon arrived at Saipan on 2 July 1945. While awaiting further routing there, she began functioning as a repair ship, doing numerous jobs on equipment brought to her shops from other ships. She sailed for Okinawa on 1 August, and upon arrival at Naval Base Okinawa on 7 August, began work repairing the damage caused to ships there by heavy enemy air attacks and long continuous operations.

The Japanese surrendered on 15 August, but Sarpedon, plagued by a new enemy, the weather, continued to work in support of occupation forces. After riding out Typhoon Ida at anchor on 16 September, she went to sea to avoid the Typhoon Jean of 29 September, but was ordered to remain in port when a third, Typhoon Louise struck on 8 and 9 October. Many craft were wrecked in the harbor, but Sarpedon's anchor held despite collisions with two barges and a PC which broke their moorings and crashed alongside. Later moving to Shanghai, China, Sarpedon continued to provide repair support to ships engaged in occupation duties until sailing from Shanghai, on 20 March 1946, for Bikini. However, her participation in the atomic bomb tests there was cancelled. After remaining at Kwajalein from 5 April to 8 May, she arrived at San Pedro, Los Angeles, on 28 May 1946, for inactivation. Sarpedon was decommissioned on 29 January 1947, and placed in reserve at San Diego.

Laid up in the Pacific Reserve Fleet, San Diego Group, she was struck from the Naval Vessel Register 15 April 1976; sold for scrapping 1 January 1977, by the Defense Reutilization and Marketing Service (DRMS); and acquired by Phaethon Shipping & Trading Corporation S.A., Panama, and renamed SS Petrola 133. The ship was broken up for scrap 30 May 1989.

== Bibliography ==
Online resources

- "Sarpedon". Dictionary of American Naval Fighting Ships. Naval History and Heritage Command. 2 September 2015. This article incorporates text from this source, which is in the public domain.
- "Bethlehem-Hingham, Hingham MA". ShipbuildingHistory.com. 11 August 2011.
- "USS Sarpedon (ARB-7)". NavSource. 9 June 2017.
