= USS Galveston (CL-93) =

Light cruiser of the United States Navy

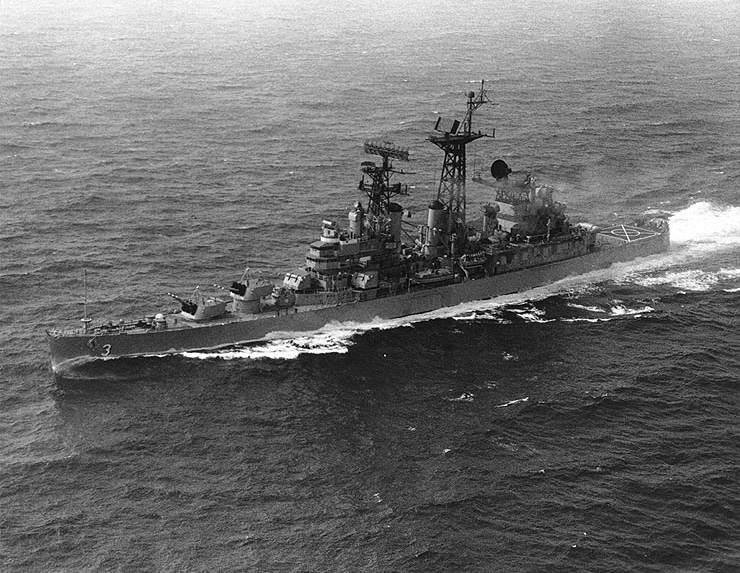
- USS Galveston, Mediterranean Sea, May 1967

History

United States
- Name: Galveston
- Namesake: City of Galveston, Texas
- Builder: Cramp Shipbuilding Co., Philadelphia
- Yard number: 536
- Laid down: 20 February 1944
- Launched: 22 April 1945
- Commissioned: 28 May 1958
- Decommissioned: 25 May 1970
- Reclassified: CLG-93, 4 February 1956; CLG-3, 23 May 1957
- Stricken: 21 December 1973
- Identification: Hull symbol:CL-93; Hull symbol:CLG-93; Hull symbol:CLG-3; Code letters:NBUV; Call sign:Giant Killer
- Fate: Sold for scrap on 16 May 1975 for $828,291
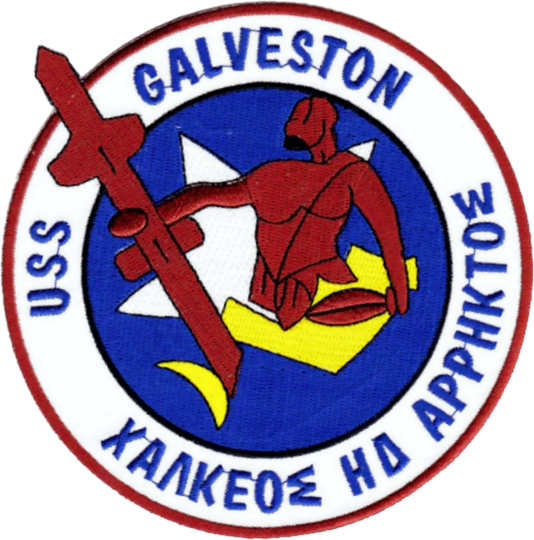
- Badge

General characteristics (as built)
- Class & type: Cleveland-class Light cruiser
- Displacement: 11,744 long tons (11,932 t) (standard); 14,131 long tons (14,358 t) (max)
- Length: 610 ft 1 in (185.95 m) oa; 608 ft (185 m)pp
- Beam: 66 ft 4 in (20.22 m)
- Draft: 25 ft 6 in (7.77 m) (mean); 25 ft (7.6 m) (max)
- Installed power: 4 × 634 psi Steam boilers; 100,000 shp (75,000 kW)
- Propulsion: 4 × geared turbines; 4 × screws
- Speed: 32.5 kn (37.4 mph; 60.2 km/h)
- Range: 11,000 nmi (20,000 km) @ 15 kn (17 mph; 28 km/h)
- Complement: 1,255 officers and enlisted
- Armament: 4 × triple 6 in (150 mm)/47 caliber Mark 16 guns; 6 × dual 5 in (130 mm)/38 caliber anti-aircraft guns; 4 × quad 40 mm (1.6 in) Bofors anti-aircraft guns; 6 × dual 40 mm (1.6 in) Bofors anti-aircraft guns; 21 × single 20 mm (0.79 in) Oerlikon anti-aircraft cannons
- Armor: Belt: 3 1/2–5 in (89–127 mm); Deck: 2 in (51 mm); Barbettes: 6 in (150 mm); Turrets: 1 1/2–6 in (38–152 mm); Conning Tower: 2 1/4–5 in (57–127 mm)
- Aircraft carried: 4 × floatplanes
- Aviation facilities: 2 × stern catapults

General characteristics (1958 rebuild)
- Class & type: Galveston-class guided missile cruiser
- Complement: 1,426 officers and enlisted
- Armament: 2 × triple 6 in (150 mm)/47 caliber Mark 16 guns; 3 × dual 5 in (130 mm)/38 caliber anti-aircraft guns in Mark 32 mount; 1 × twin-rail Mark 7 Talos SAM launcher, 46 missiles

USS Galveston (hull numbers: CL-93/CLG-3) was a Cleveland-class light cruiser of the United States Navy that was later converted to a Galveston-class guided missile cruiser. She was launched by William Cramp & Sons Shipbuilding Company, Philadelphia 22 April 1945, sponsored by Mrs. Clark Wallace Thompson. The cruiser's construction was suspended when nearly complete on 24 June 1946; and the hull assigned to the Philadelphia Group of the Atlantic Reserve Fleet. She was reclassified CLG-93 on 4 February 1956; then reclassified to CLG-3 on 23 May 1957; and commissioned at Philadelphia 28 May 1958.

== 1958–1960 ==
Refit as a Galveston-class guided missile light cruiser, the warship departed Philadelphia on 30 June 1958 for builder's trials out of Norfolk, Va., in the Virginia Capes area, that included "highly successful" tests of her new Talos missile and tracking gear. The Talos supersonic surface-to-air missile was 38 ft long, weighed nearly 3,000 pounds (1,400 kg), and was powered by a novel 20,053 lbf ramjet engine, plus a solid-fuel rocket booster. With a range of over 65 miles (105 km) for early variants, and over 100 for later ones, and speeds of up to Mach 4, it was designed to destroy enemy aircraft at high altitudes using either a conventional or atomic warhead. She finished out the year with operations in the Norfolk area.

Galveston arrived at San Juan, Puerto Rico, on 16 January 1959, for training and evaluation operations in the waters of the West Indies. She successfully launched the first Talos missile ever fired at sea on 24 February 1959. The Talos was termed by Admiral Arleigh Burke as "the best antiaircraft missile in any arsenal in the world". The cruiser set course for Norfolk on 17 March and a special yard period in the Philadelphia Naval Shipyard.

In July 1959, Galveston conducted shakedown and acceptance trials in the Virginia Capes area, followed by a refresher training cruise to waters off Cuba and the testing of her radar and communications in war games with the U.S. Air Force. On 4 January 1960, she departed Norfolk for a visit to Charleston, South Carolina, and operations off the Florida coast, Puerto Rico, and the Virgin Islands. She then headed to her namesake city of Galveston, arriving on 16 February for a Silver Service presentation. Returning to Norfolk, the cruiser unloaded her ammunition for shock tests off the Bahamas, then entered the Philadelphia Naval Shipyard on 25 March 1960 for a yard period that extended into the fall. During this time the cruiser entertained more than 30,000 visitors. She headed for the Virginia Capes 24 October 1960, successfully completing her first missile transfer at sea.

== 1961 ==
On 6 January 1961, Galveston departed Norfolk for more Bureau of Naval Weapons technical evaluation of her Talos missile systems, including tests of the IV Talos, its capabilities and potentials, in areas off Jacksonville, Florida, Puerto Rico and the Virgin Islands. These evaluations completed 1 March, she departed San Juan for refresher training and her final acceptance trial out of Guantanamo Bay. The cruiser returned to Norfolk on 9 April, but soon steamed to Jacksonville, where on 8 May she began duty under the Operational Technical Evaluation Force that included extensive testing of her missile system and many Talos firings. The effectiveness of the system and the weapon were demonstrated by a new, long-range record as well as a successful two-missile salvo shot. The Talos missile cruiser entertained over 17,000 visitors at Cape Canaveral on the Armed Forces weekend celebration in May; completed later phases of her evaluation exercises in the Caribbean through 21 July 1960; then visited Bayonne, New Jersey, where her missile fire-control radars were removed in preparation for overhaul. Galveston was overhauled in the Philadelphia Naval Shipyard (30 August 1961 – 23 July 1962). This overhaul included modifications to the fire control system of the Talos missile.

The visit to Charleston was for electronic equipment repair. She had to go in at low tide, and lightning rods had to be lowered to pass under the Charleston bridge.

== 1962–1964 ==
Galveston departed Philadelphia on 23 July 1962, transited the Panama Canal for San Diego, California; and joined Cruiser-Destroyer Flotilla 9, U.S. Pacific Fleet, on 24 August 1962. While home-ported in San Diego she continued trials with the Talos. The Talos was fired successfully at an old destroyer escort, striking it above decks and exiting above the waterline. No explosives were used. She operated along the West Coast until October 1963 when she sailed for the Western Pacific as flagship of the flotilla. During the next six months she operated in the Far East with the 7th Fleet off Japan, Taiwan, and Okinawa. She returned to San Diego 16 April 1964 and resumed West Coast training.

== 1965 ==
Following a four-month overhaul from October 1964 to February 1965, Galveston departed San Diego 4 June for operations off the coast of South Vietnam. She touched at Subic Bay, Philippines, 21 June, then sailed to join the 7th Fleet in the South China Sea. During the next 5 months she ranged the Southeast Asian waters from the Gulf of Thailand to the Gulf of Tonkin while supporting the American effort to repel Communist aggression in South Vietnam. She provided gunfire support during search-and-clear operations at Chu Lai and at the Vung Tuong Peninsula. In addition she provided air defense for 7th Fleet carriers in the South China Sea and conducted search and rescue operations in the Gulf of Tonkin. She departed the Philippines on 2 December and arrived at San Diego on 18 December.

== 1966–1967 ==
Resuming operations early in January 1966, Galveston operated out of San Diego to the Hawaiian Islands and along the California coast while keeping her crew and equipment in a peak state of readiness. From 31 July to 4 November she underwent modernization overhaul, then she resumed training for the remainder of 1966. Early in 1967 she departed San Diego for the East Coast, and for much of the rest of that year was assigned to the Atlantic Fleet for duty in the Atlantic and the Mediterranean.

== 1968–1969 ==
On 19 October 1968, Galveston departed Seal Beach, California on her final Westpac tour. She divided her time between operations on Yankee Station in the north and the Da Nang area in the south where she temporarily replaced the USS New Jersey (BB-62) on the gun line, firing 3,500 rounds of ammunition from her 5"/38 and 6-inch/47-caliber guns in one nine-day period. She effectively supported Republic of Korea Marines in the Delta area. Galveston returned to San Diego on 2 February 1969. She departed San Diego for the East Coast and duty with the Atlantic Fleet performing duties in the Mediterranean. In 1970 she was placed in the Pacific Reserve Fleet, San Diego and in 1975 was sold for scrap to National Metal and Steel Corp.

== In popular culture ==
The 1963-1964 Far East tour was commemorated in the large back patch on the G-1 flight jacket worn by lead Tom Cruise in the 1986 film Top Gun. Retired U.S. Navy Commander Michael Dahm theorizes the patch may have been a reference to real U.S. Navy pilot Harry J. Post, commanding officer of the Navy's first Fighter Weapons School. Post had been the only naval aviator on board on the tour.

== Gallery ==
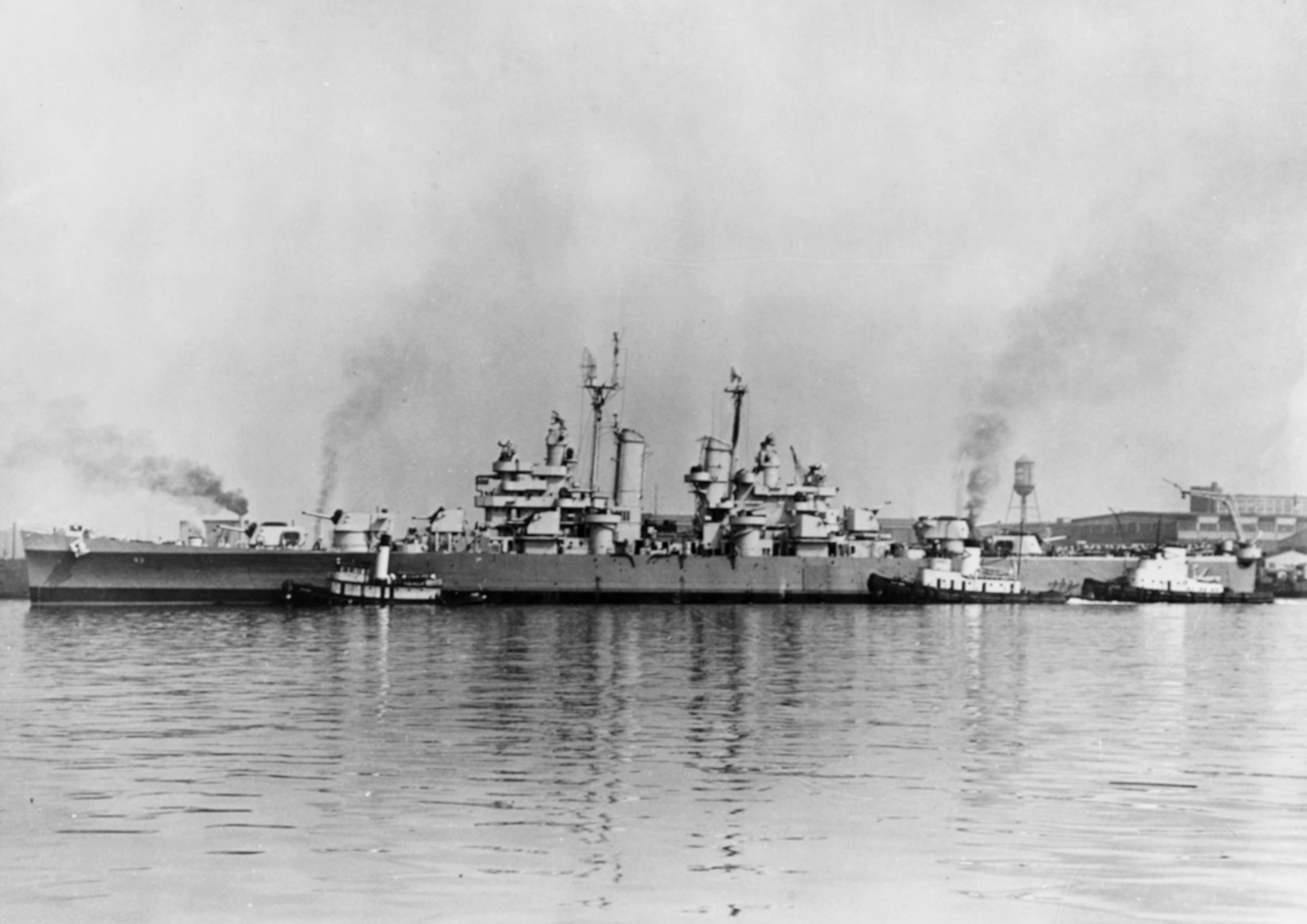
USS Galveston (CL-93) at the Cramp shipyard, 1946.

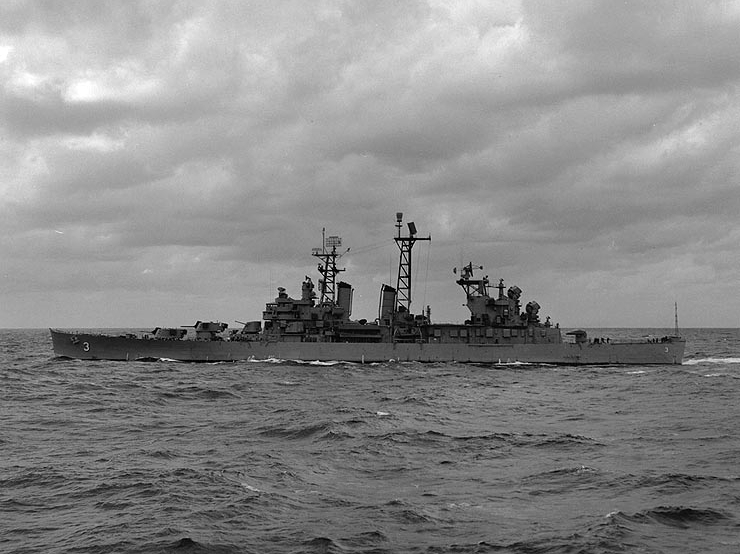
USS Galveston (CLG-3) after her conversion, 1959.

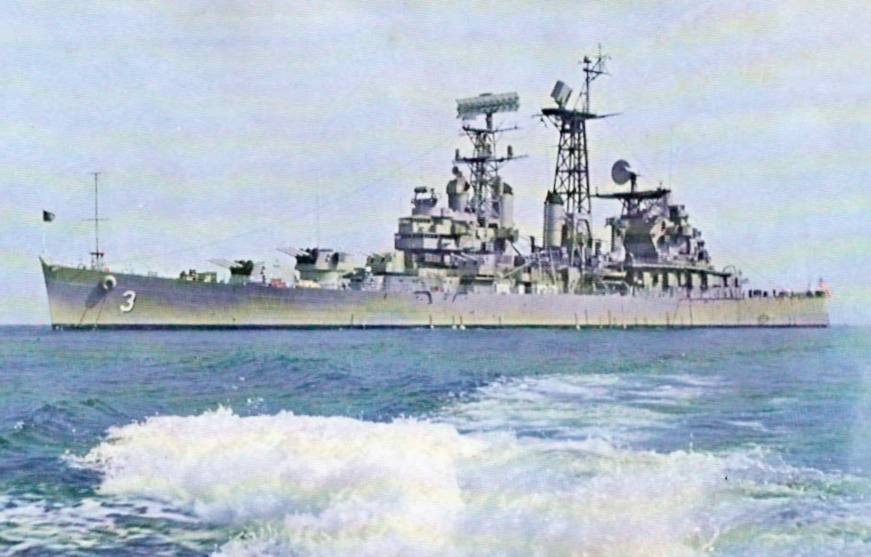
Galveston in 1963.

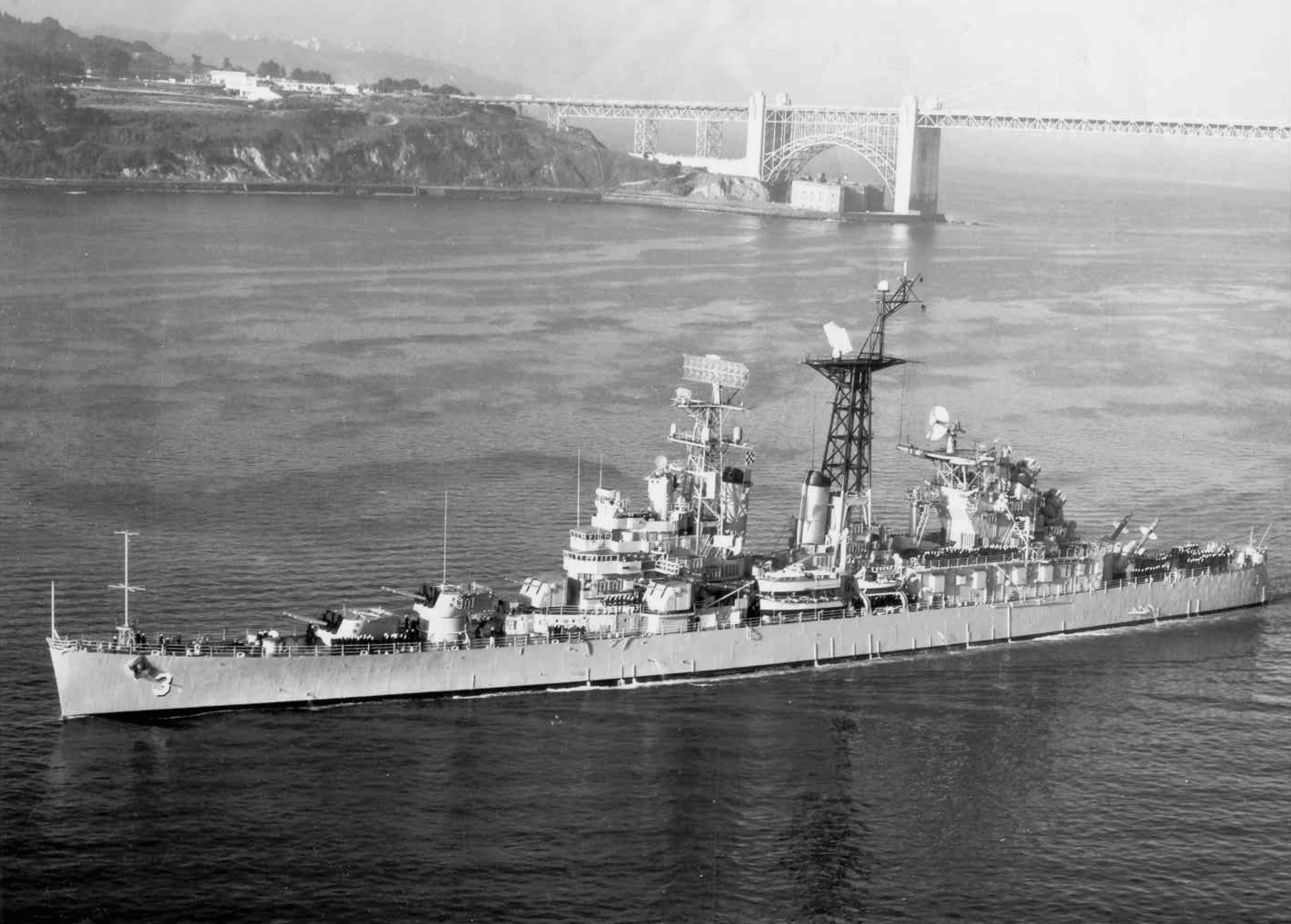
Galveston in 1965.

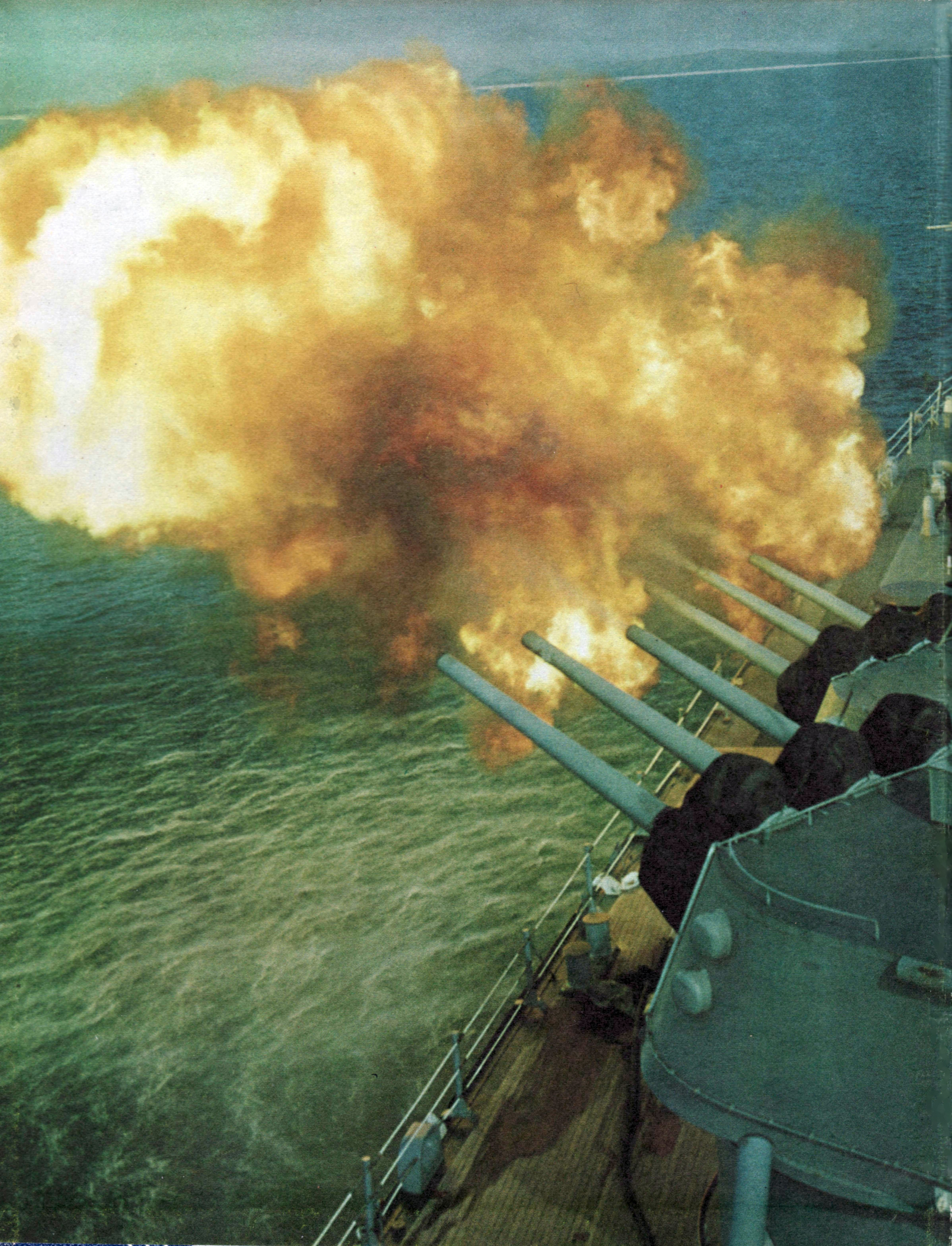
Fire support off Vietnam, 1965.
