= USS Midas =

WWII repair ship

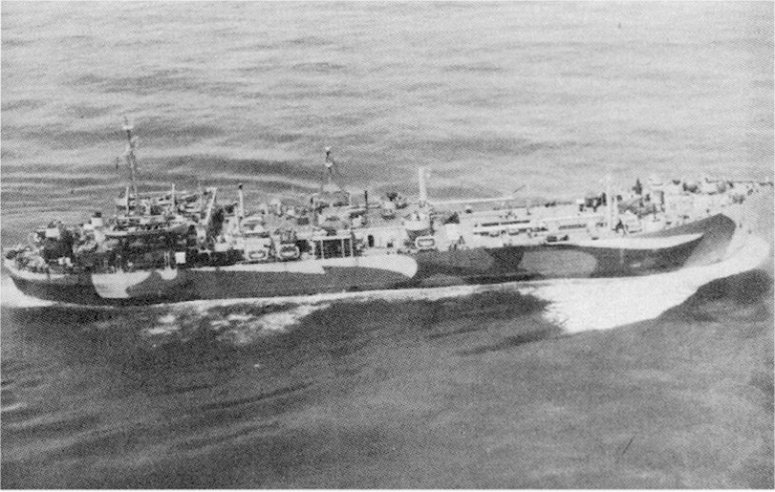
- USS Midas (ARB-5), underway, date and location unknown. Note Midas is painted Camouflage Measure 31, Design 8L.

History

United States
- Name: LST-514; Midas
- Namesake: Midas
- Builder: Chicago Bridge & Iron Company, Seneca, Illinois
- Laid down: 31 August 1943
- Launched: 24 December 1943
- Commissioned: 23 May 1944
- Decommissioned: January 1947
- Reclassified: Battle Damage Repair Ship, 3 November 1943
- Stricken: 15 April 1976
- Identification: Hull symbol: LST-514; Hull symbol: ARB-5; Code letters: NJXJ
- Honors and awards: 1 × battle star (World War II)
- Fate: Disposed of by MARAD sale, 19 November 1980

General characteristics
- Class & type: LST-491-class tank landing ship; Aristaeus-class battle damage repair ship
- Displacement: 1,781 long tons (1,810 t) (light); 4,100 long tons (4,200 t) (full)
- Length: 328 ft (100 m) oa
- Beam: 50 ft (15 m)
- Draft: 11 ft 2 in (3.40 m)
- Installed power: 2 × 900 hp (670 kW) Electro-Motive Diesel 12-567A diesel engines; 1,700 shp (1,300 kW)
- Propulsion: 1 × Falk main reduction gears; 2 × Propellers
- Speed: 11.6 kn (21.5 km/h; 13.3 mph)
- Complement: 20 officers, 234 enlisted men
- Armament: 1 × 3 in (76 mm)/50 caliber gun; 2 × quad 40 mm (1.57 in) Bofors guns; 8 × 20 mm (0.79 in) Oerlikon cannons

Service record
- Operations: Leyte landings (5–18 October, 12–29 November 1944)
- Awards: Combat Action Ribbon; American Campaign Medal; Asiatic–Pacific Campaign Medal; World War II Victory Medal; Philippine Republic Presidential Unit Citation; Philippine Liberation Medal

USS Midas (ARB-5) was planned as a United States Navy LST-491-class tank landing ship, but was redesignated as one of twelve Aristaeus-class battle damage repair ships built for the United States Navy during World War II. Named for Midas (in Greek mythology, the king of Phrygia, whose touch turned all to gold), she was the only US Naval vessel to bear the name.

== Construction ==
Laid down as LST-514 on 31 August 1943, by the Chicago Bridge & Iron Company of Seneca, Illinois; reclassified and named Midas (ARB‑5) 3 November 1943; launched 24 December 1943; sponsored by Mrs. Frederick J. Miller; converted by the Maryland Drydock Company for service as a battle damage repair ship; and commissioned on 23 May 1944, at Baltimore, Maryland.

== Service history ==
Midas got underway for the Pacific, departing Norfolk, Virginia, on 25 June 1944. She arrived off New Guinea on 26 August, having repaired ships in the Society Islands and New Caledonia en route. She continued to operate along the northern coast of New Guinea until late in October, when ordered to the Philippines, arriving on 12 November, as the first 7th Fleet repair ship at San Pedro, Leyte.

During her stay she witnessed numerous air attacks. She shot down an aircraft on 27 November, and she repaired ships of all types, readying them for further operations in the Philippines. After 25 May 1945, she continued her battle damage and routine repair work from Guiuan Roadstead, Samar, in the Philippine Islands. With the end of the war, Midas centered more on mine damaged hulls. Short handed as a result of men transferred for discharge, she steamed for home on 10 December, arriving San Francisco on 17 January 1946.

== Post-war service ==
Midas served in the 12th Naval District until transferred to San Diego in May. The repair ship was placed in reserve, in commission, on 30 November 1946, as part of the 19th Fleet. She was decommissioned on 17 January 1947. Transferred to the Maritime Commission (MARCOM) for lay up in the National Defense Reserve Fleet, Suisun Bay, California. She was struck from the Naval Vessel Register on 15 April 1976. Disposed of by MARAD sale on 19 November 1980, sold to Colombia, and retained her name, Midas.

== Awards ==
Midas received one battle stars for World War II service.

== Bibliography ==
Online resources

- "Midas". Dictionary of American Naval Fighting Ships. Naval History and Heritage Command. 10 August 2015. This article incorporates text from this source, which is in the public domain.
- "USS Midas (ARB-5)". NavSource. 8 November 2013.
