= Naval Base San Diego =

US Navy facility in California

- San Diego, California in the United States
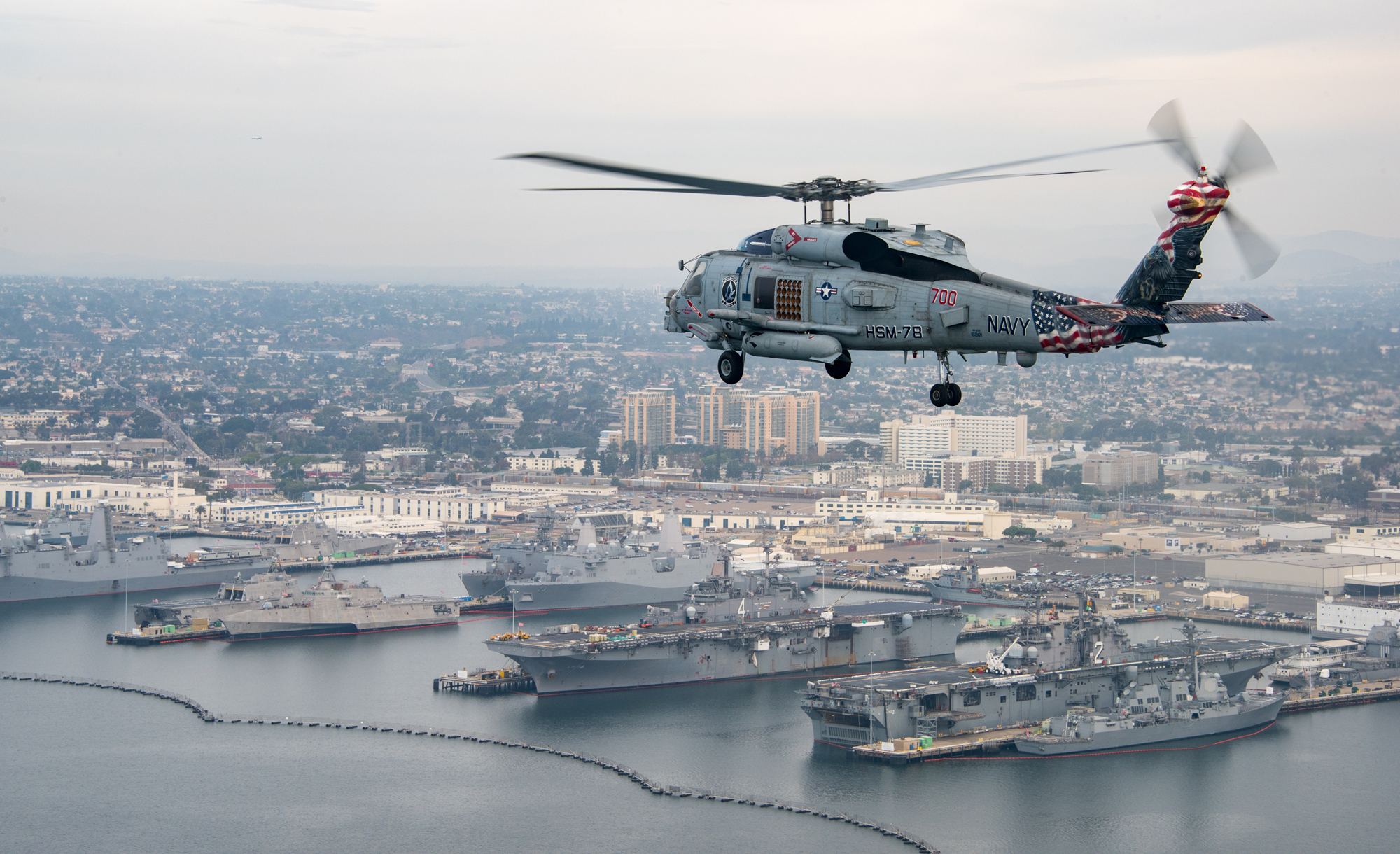

Site information
- Type: Naval base
- Owner: Department of Defense
- Operator: US Navy
- Controlled by: Navy Region Southwest
- Condition: Operational
- Website: Official website

Location
- Location within California Location within the United States
- Coordinates: 32°41′05″N 117°07′48″W
- Area: 1,926 acres (779 ha; 3.009 sq mi)

Site history
- Built: 1918; 108 years ago
- In use: 1918 - present

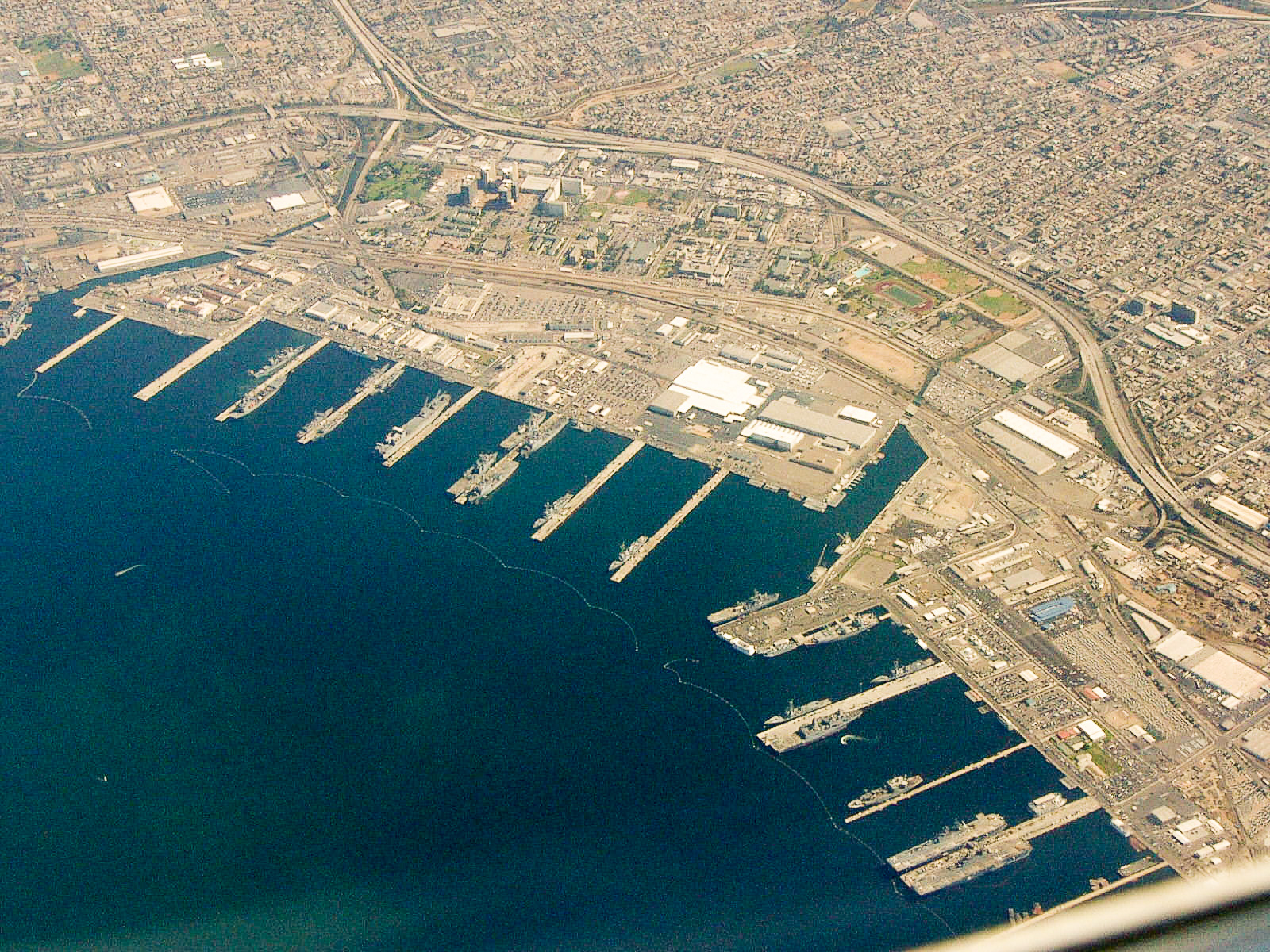
2008 aerial view of Naval Base San Diego

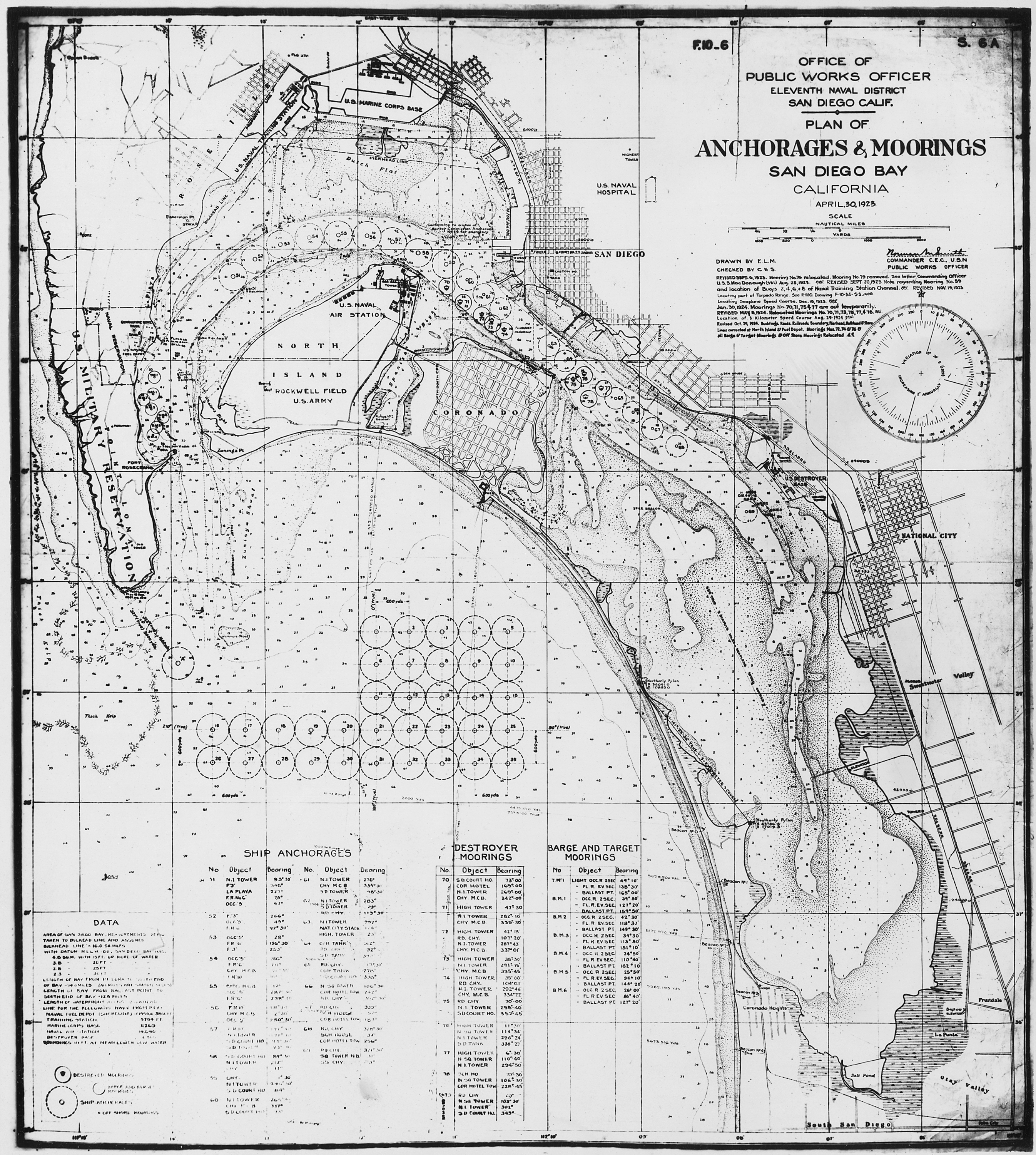
1923 military map of San Diego Bay, depicting anchorages and moorings, various military facilities, Coronado, National City, and the surrounding area.

Naval Base San Diego is a United States Navy base in San Diego, California. It is the world's second largest surface ship naval base, after Naval Station Norfolk. Naval Base San Diego is the principal homeport of the United States Pacific Fleet, consisting of over 50 ships and over 150 tenant commands. The base is composed of 13 piers stretched over 1,600 acres (650 ha) of land and 326 acres (132 ha) of water. The total on base population is over 24,000 military personnel and over 10,000 civilians.

== History ==
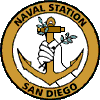
Seal of Naval Station San Diego prior to its re-designation as a naval base.

The 1,600 acres (650 ha) of land on which the Naval Base sits today was occupied in 1918 by a coalition of concrete ship building firms known as the Emergency Fleet Corporation, under the single company name Pacific Marine Construction. But Pacific Marine began to lose profits with the conclusion of World War I, and negotiated a return of the land back to the City of San Diego. Meanwhile, the Navy was exploring the small tract of land to establish a west coast ship repair facility and moved on the opportunity to acquire the land. By 1920, the Navy and the Emergency Fleet Corporation had negotiated the transfer of land improvements to the United States Navy. Still, three obstacles stood in the way of a Navy repair facility: the coalition company, Schofield Engineering Co., still retained an option to purchase the existing plant; a local shipping board had not granted permission for more construction; and finally, Congress had not yet passed an appropriations bill to authorize funds to begin work.

Nevertheless, by June 1920, Congress passed the appropriations bill- $750,000 of which was earmarked for the navy repair base. With the money appropriated, Schofield still delayed in releasing their option on the land. At the time, Admiral Roger Welles, then Commandant of the 11th Naval District, had grown weary of Schofield's delaying tactics and threatened to pull stakes and establish a repair base in San Pedro, Los Angeles, California.

His threats worked. On 21 February 1921, Welles assumed formal custody of the property. In May 1921, Commander H.N. Jensen, Commanding Officer of the repair tender USS Prairie, was directed to moor at the site to establish repair operations. On 23 February 1922, acting Secretary of the Navy Theodore Roosevelt Jr. issued General Order 78 establishing the facility as the U.S. Destroyer Base, San Diego.

During its first years in commission, the base grew rapidly as repair facilities expanded, torpedo and radio schools were established, and more shops were constructed. During 1924, the base decommissioned 77 destroyers and commissioned seven.

By 1937, the Destroyer Base had added two additional tracts of land and by then, its 29 buildings and other improvements amounted to a cost of more than $3.2 million.

The base then expanded heavily during World War II, and by 1942, the Navy had added expanded fleet training schools, and an amphibious force training unit. By the following year, it was determined the scope of operations exceeded the base's basic function as a Destroyer Base. On 7 October 1943, the base was re-designated the U.S. Repair Base, San Diego, a title it retained throughout World War II. Between 1943 and 1945, the newly named base performed conversion, overhaul, maintenance, and battle damage repair to more than 5,117 ships. Central to this maintenance were the Navy's construction and delivery of 155 new floating dry docks deployed to various bases, including three 3,000-ton, three 1,000-ton and one 900-ton floating docks remaining at the San Diego Repair Base. The floating dry docks became the central repair and training facilities on the base which were crucial to the World War II mission.

After World War II, base operations were again reorganized, with a post-war mission to provide logistical support (including repair and dry-docking) to ships of the active fleet. On 15 September 1946, the Secretary of the Navy re-designated the repair base Naval Station, San Diego. By the end of 1946, the base had grown to 294 buildings with floor space square footage of more than 6,900,000 square feet (640,000 m^{2}), berthing facilities included five piers of more than 18,000 feet (5,500 m) of berthing space. Land then totaled more than 921 acres (373 ha) and 16 miles (26 km) of roads. Barracks could accommodate 380 officers and 18,000 enlisted men. More than 3,500 sailors could be fed in the galley at a single sitting on the base.

Later, in the 1990s, the Naval Station became the principal homeport of the U.S. Pacific Fleet, when the Long Beach Naval Shipyard was closed for the final time on 30 September 1994. Naval Station San Diego was realigned under Commander, Navy Region Southwest and became one in a triad of metropolitan Navy bases that now make up the bulk of the metro area Navy's presence. With that change, the base became the hub of all Navy port operations for the Region, assumed logistical responsibility for both Naval Medical Center San Diego and the Region headquarters and was re-designated Naval Base San Diego.

== Operations ==
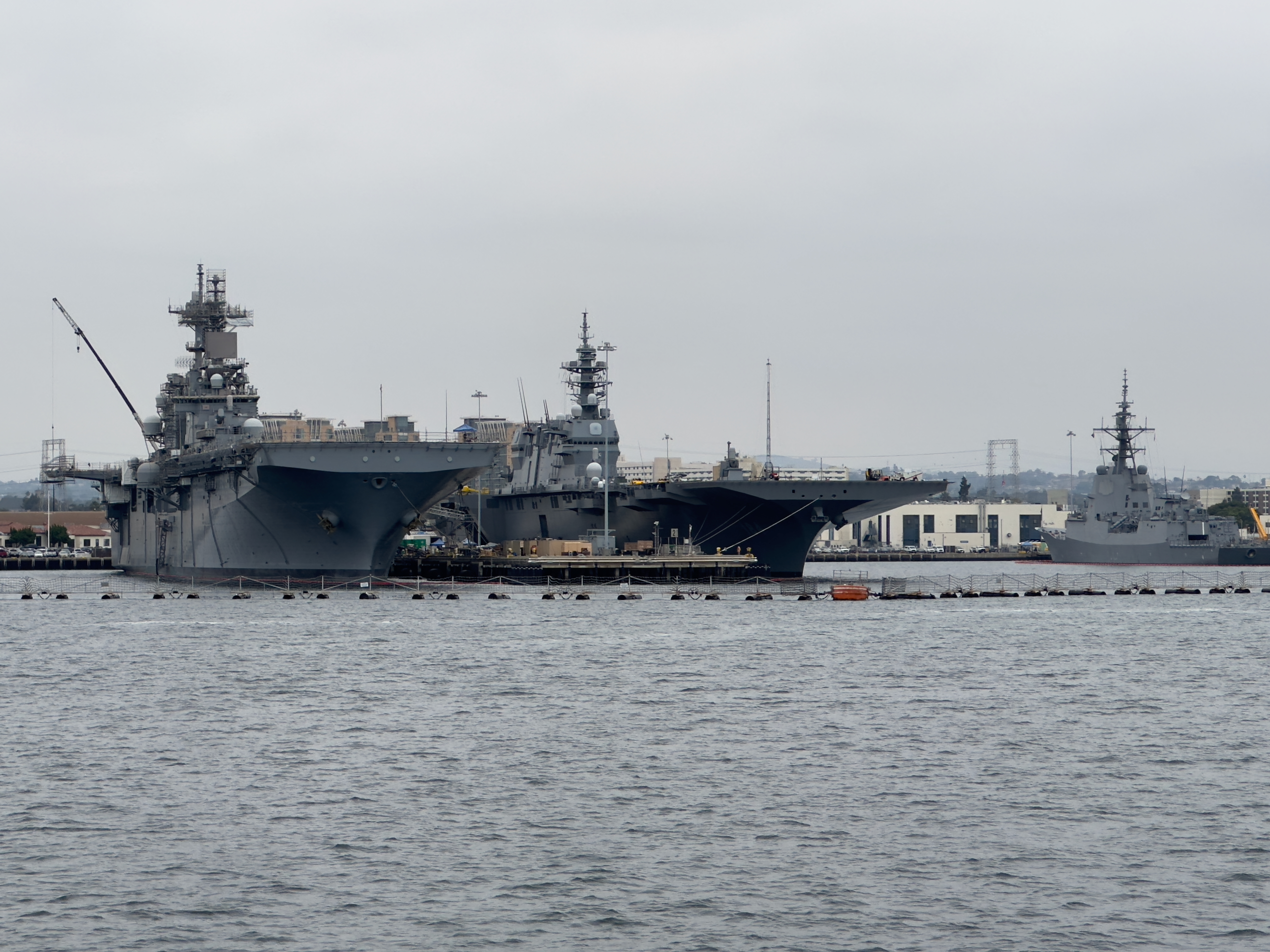
American, Australian, and Japanese ships at the base.

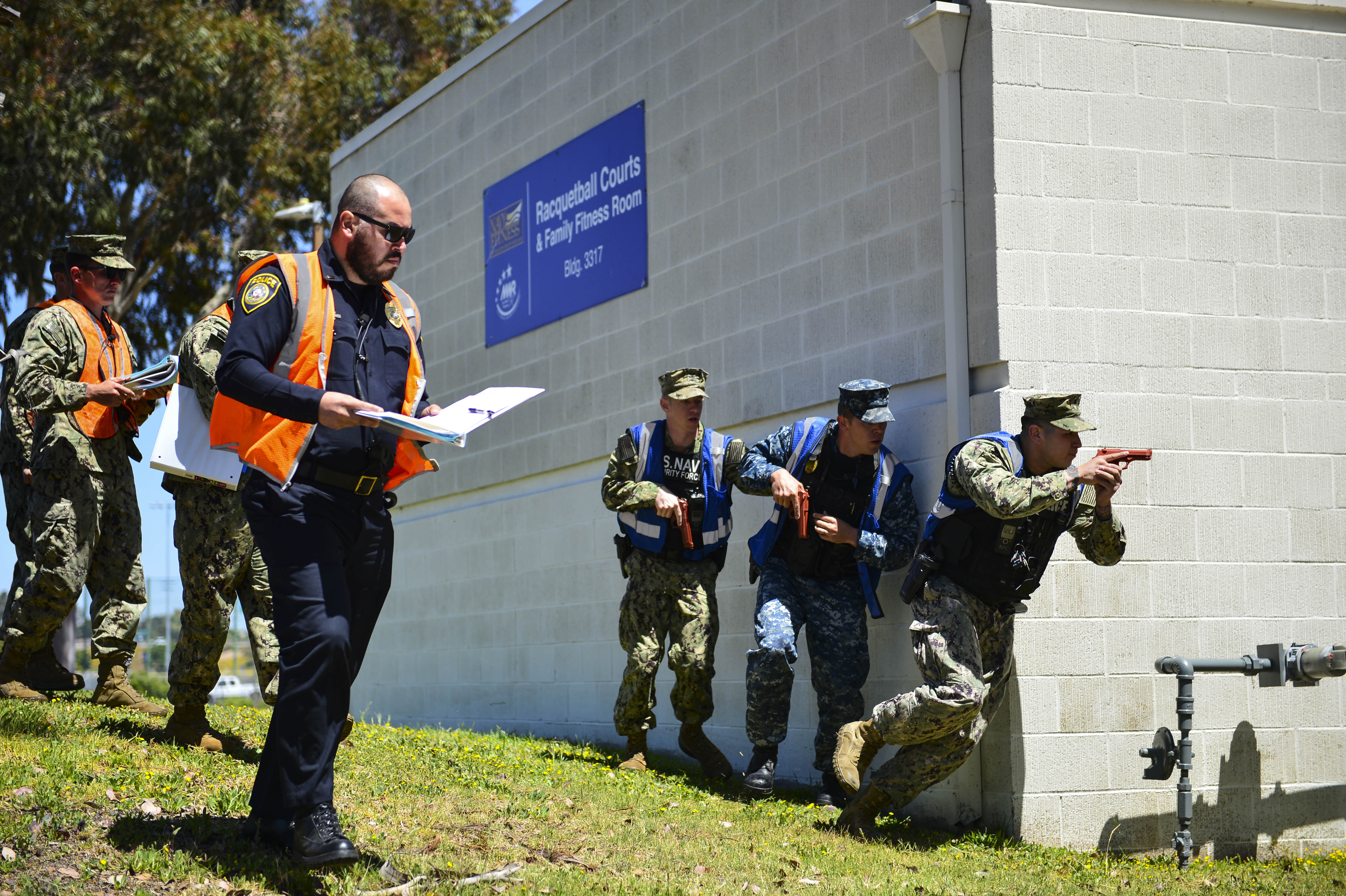
Navy Security Forces respond to a simulated attack during a force protection exercise on Naval Base San Diego.

Naval Base San Diego is home port to approximately 54 ships, including 46 U.S. Navy ships, two Littoral Combat Ships, two U.S. Coast Guard cutters, and eight ships of the Military Sealift Command, as well as research and auxiliary vessels.

Ashore, the base has approximately 150 separate tenant commands and other Navy support facilities, each having specific and specialized fleet support missions. The base is a workplace for approximately 26,000 military, civilian, and contract personnel. Additionally, the base has rooms to house more than 4,000 men and women in modern apartment-like barracks, including new state-of-the-art residential towers.

Support services on base includes less direct and indirect fleet support: waterfront operations, force protection (security), supply, Navy Exchange and Commissary shopping centers, bachelor quarters, food services, public affairs, administration, transient personnel administration, fiscal management, equal employment opportunity, civil engineering, family services, recreation on the base and near various military family housing areas, medical and dental care, religious services, transportation, utilities, legal support, counseling and assistance, facility maintenance, fire protection, educational services, and child care for more than 300 children daily at the base Child Development Center.

The base has a plant value of $4.5 billion.

An explosion and fire on the USS Bonhomme Richard (LHD-6) on July 12, 2020, resulted in the eventual decommissioning and scrapping of the ship.

== Homeported ships ==
(As of August 2025)

=== Amphibious Assault Ships ===
- USS Essex (LHD-2)
- USS Boxer (LHD-4)
- USS Makin Island (LHD-8)
- USS Green Bay (LPD-20)
- USS Anchorage (LPD-23)
- USS Somerset (LPD-25)
- USS John P. Murtha (LPD-26)
- USS Portland (LPD-27)
- USS Germantown (LSD-42)
- USS Comstock (LSD-45)
- USS Ashland (LSD-48)
- USS Harpers Ferry (LSD-49)
- USS Pearl Harbor (LSD-52)

=== Cruisers ===
- USS Princeton (CG-59)
- USS Chosin (CG-65)
- USS Lake Erie (CG-70)
- USS Cape St. George (CG-71)

=== Destroyers ===
- USS Curtis Wilbur (DDG-54)
- USS Russell (DDG-59)
- USS Paul Hamilton (DDG-60)
- USS Fitzgerald (DDG-62)
- USS Stethem (DDG-63)
- USS O'Kane (DDG-77)
- USS Mustin (DDG-89)
- USS Chafee (DDG-90)
- USS Pinckney (DDG-91)
- USS Momsen (DDG-92)
- USS Chung-Hoon (DDG-93)
- USS Halsey (DDG-97)
- USS Sterett (DDG-104)
- USS Stockdale (DDG-106)
- USS Spruance (DDG-111)
- USS Lenah H. Sutcliffe Higbee (DDG-123)
- USS Jack H. Lucas (DDG-125)
- USS Zumwalt (DDG-1000)
- USS Michael Monsoor (DDG-1001)
- USS Lyndon B. Johnson (DDG-1002)

=== Littoral Combat Ships ===
- USS Fort Worth (LCS-3)
- USS Jackson (LCS-6)
- USS Montgomery (LCS-8)
- USS Gabrielle Giffords (LCS-10)
- USS Omaha (LCS-12)
- USS Manchester (LCS-14)
- USS Tulsa (LCS-16)
- USS Charleston (LCS-18)
- USS Cincinnati (LCS-20)
- USS Kansas City (LCS-22)
- USS Oakland (LCS-24)
- USS Mobile (LCS-26)
- USS Savannah (LCS-28)
- USS Canberra (LCS-30)
- USS Santa Barbara (LCS-32)
- USS Augusta (LCS-34)
- USS Kingsville (LCS-36)
- USS Pierre (LCS-38)

=== Supply and Support Ships ===
- USNS Bob Hope (T-AKR-300) Transferred to MARAD
- USNS Mercy (T-AH-19)
- USNS Henry J. Kaiser (T-AO-187)
- USNS Yukon (T-AO-202)
- SS Curtiss (T-AVB-4)

== In fiction and literature ==
Naval Base San Diego is the setting for the 2005 naval thriller novel Treason by Don Brown.

== Aerial view ==
The Navy has promised to alter the design of one of the buildings on site, which from above clearly resembles a Nazi swastika pitched at the correct 45-degree angle the Nazis used. A report by SFGATE suggests that top officials in the Navy knew what the design of the building would look like prior to the installation.

== See also ==
- Pacific Reserve Fleet, San Diego
- USS Midway Museum
