= USS Diomedes =

Aristaeus-class repair ship

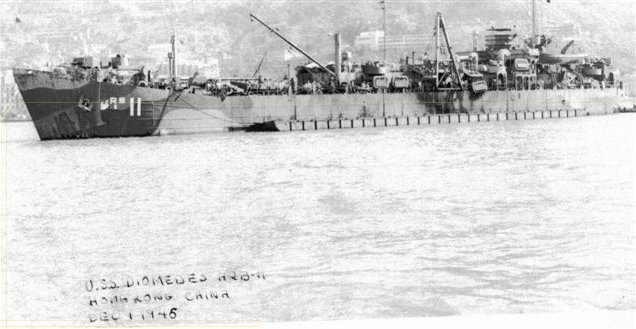
- USS Diomedes (ARB-11) at anchor in Hong Kong Harbor, 1 December 1945

History

United States
- Name: USS LST-1119
- Builder: Bethlehem Steel Company, Hingham, Massachusetts
- Laid down: 19 October 1944
- Launched: 11 January 1945
- Sponsored by: Mrs. M. D. Hembree
- Commissioned: 23 January 1945
- Decommissioned: 21 February 1945
- Renamed: USS Diomedes (ARB-11)
- Namesake: Diomedes
- Recommissioned: 23 June 1945
- Decommissioned: 3 December 1946
- Fate: Transferred to West Germany, 7 June 1961

History

West Germany
- Name: Wotan (A513)
- Namesake: Wotan
- Acquired: 7 June 1961
- Commissioned: 20 January 1966
- Decommissioned: 23 August 1991
- Fate: used for training and public events of the Bundeswehr

General characteristics
- Class & type: Aristaeus-class repair ship
- Displacement: 1,781 long tons (1,810 t) light; 3,700 long tons (3,759 t) full
- Length: 328 ft (100 m)
- Beam: 50 ft (15 m)
- Draft: 11 ft 2 in (3.40 m)
- Propulsion: 2 × General Motors 12-567 diesel engines, two shafts, twin rudders
- Speed: 12 knots (22 km/h; 14 mph)
- Complement: 260 officers and enlisted men
- Armament: 2 × 40 mm guns; 8 × 20 mm guns

USS Diomedes (ARB-11) was an Aristaeus-class repair ship built for the United States Navy during World War II. Named for Diomedes (in Greek mythology, a prince of Argos, one of the bravest heroes of the Trojan War), she was the only U.S. Naval vessel to bear the name.

LST-1119 was launched on 11 January 1945 by the Chicago Bridge and Iron Company of Seneca, Illinois; sponsored by Mrs. M. D. Hembree; placed in partial commission from 23 January to 21 February 1945 for the passage to Baltimore, Maryland; converted to a battle damage repair ship as USS Diomedes (ARB-11); and commissioned on 23 June 1945.

== Service history ==
Diomedes arrived at Okinawa on 25 September, and on 3 October got underway for Hong Kong to provide repair services. She sailed from Hong Kong on 8 December and called at Kiirun, Formosa before arriving at Taku, China on 19 December to continue her repair work. Departing Taku on 20 March 1946 Diomedes called at Pearl Harbor, and arrived at Charleston, South Carolina on 28 May. She arrived in Jacksonville, Florida on 2 June, and was placed out of commission in reserve there on 3 December 1946.

Diomedes was transferred on 7 June 1961 to West Germany, whereupon she was renamed Wotan (A513). Her final fate is unknown.
