= USS Telamon =

1944 LST-542-class tank landing ship

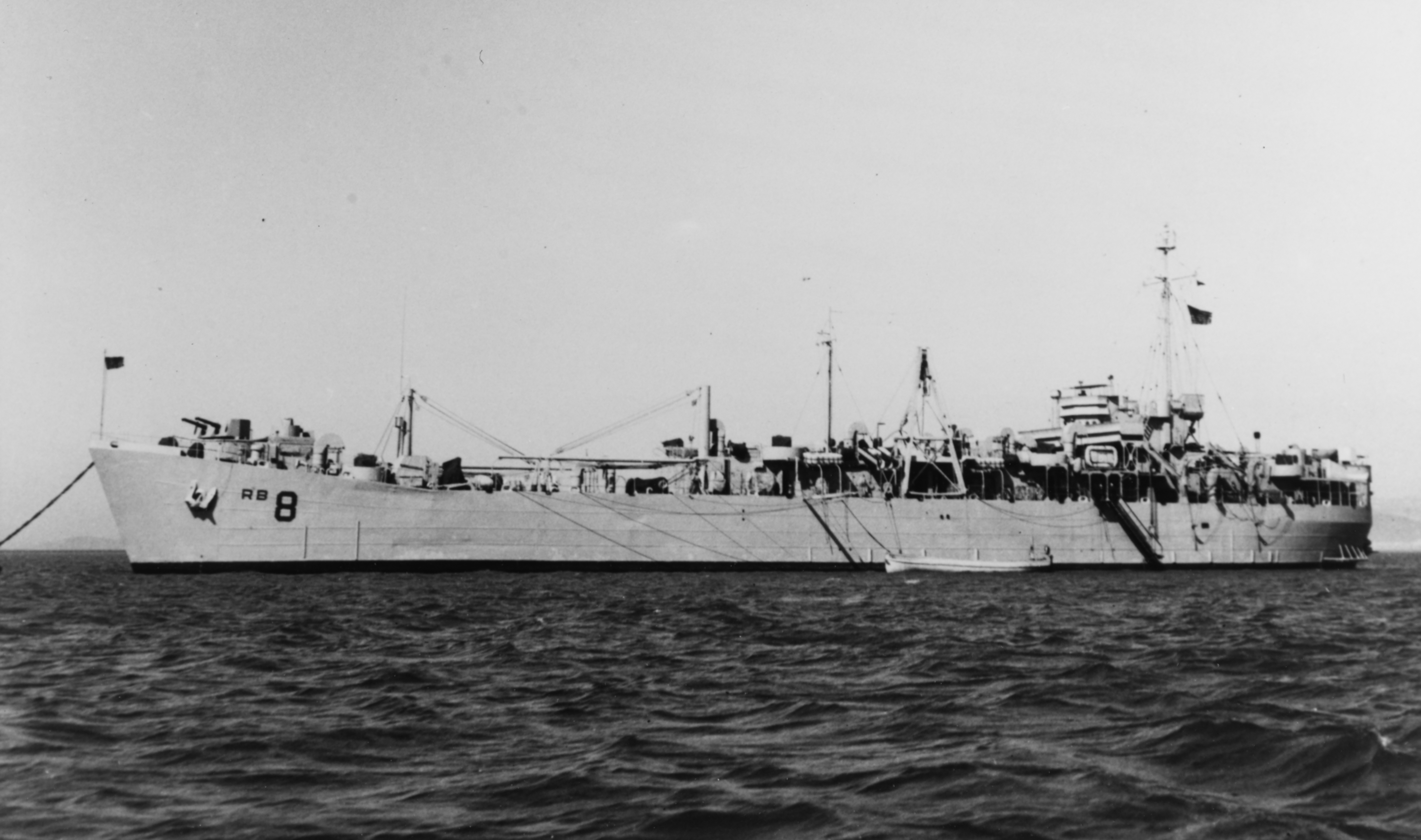
- USS Telamon (ARB-8), circa 1946

History

United States
- Name: LST-976; Telamon
- Namesake: Telamon
- Builder: Bethlehem-Hingham Shipyard, Hingham, Massachusetts
- Yard number: 3446
- Laid down: 5 December 1944
- Launched: 10 January 1945
- Commissioned: 5 February 1945, partial commission; 1 June 1945, full commission
- Decommissioned: 11 September 1945
- Recommissioned: 1946
- Decommissioned: 20 May 1947
- Stricken: 1 June 1973
- Identification: Hull symbol: LST-976; Hull symbol: ARB-8; Code letters: NJLV
- Fate: Sold for scrapping, 1 March 1974

General characteristics
- Class & type: LST-542-class tank landing ship; Aristaeus-class battle damage repair ship
- Displacement: 1,781 long tons (1,810 t) light; 3,960 long tons (4,020 t) full load
- Length: 328 ft (100 m) oa
- Beam: 50 ft (15 m)
- Draft: 11 ft 2 in (3.40 m)
- Installed power: 2 × 900 hp (670 kW) Electro-Motive Diesel 12-567A diesel engines; 1,800 shp (1,300 kW)
- Propulsion: 1 × Falk main reduction gears; 2 × Propellers
- Speed: 11.6 kn (21.5 km/h; 13.3 mph)
- Complement: 15 officers, 271 enlisted men
- Armament: 2 × quad 40 mm (1.57 in) Bofors guns; 8 × single 20 mm (0.79 in) Oerlikon cannons

USS Telamon (ARB-8) was planned as a United States Navy LST-542-class tank landing ship but was converted as one of twelve Aristaeus-class battle damage repair ships built for the Navy during World War II. Named for Telamon (in Greek mythology, son of the King Aeacus, who accompanied Jason as one of his Argonauts), she was the only US Naval vessel to bear the name.

== Construction ==
Originally designated LST-956, the ship was redesignated ARB-8 and named Telamon on 28 April 1944, before the construction began. She was laid down on 5 December 1944, at Hingham, Massachusetts, by the Bethlehem-Hingham Shipyard; launched on 10 January 1945; and commissioned on 5 February 1945. After steaming to Baltimore, she was decommissioned, underwent conversion at Maryland Drydock Company, and was recommissioned on 1 June 1945.

== Service history ==
On 14 July, the new battle damage repair ship reported for duty with the US Pacific Fleet and on 23 July, was assigned to Pearl Harbor as her home port and yard. She joined Service Squadron 10 at Guam, in September, shortly before being placed in the Pacific Fleet Reserve on 11 September 1945.

In the spring of 1946, as part of Service Group 1.8, she took part in preparations for "Operation Crossroads" at Bikini Atoll. On 21 June 1946, before the nuclear tests took place, she departed the atoll and steamed to Kwajalein. She was decommissioned on 20 May 1947, and joined the San Diego Group Reserve Fleet that same day. She remained inactive until 1 June 1973, when her name was struck from the Naval Vessel Register.

Telamon was sold for scrapping 1 March 1974, by the Defense Reutilization and Marketing Service.

== Bibliography ==
Online resources

- "Telamon". Dictionary of American Naval Fighting Ships. Naval History and Heritage Command. 25 September 2015. This article incorporates text from this source, which is in the public domain.
- "Bethlehem-Hingham, Hingham MA". ShipbuildingHistory.com. 11 August 2011.
- "USS Telamon (ARB-8)". NavSource. 2 December 2016.
