= USS Zeus (ARB-4) =

Aristaeus-class battle damage repair ship

- USS Zeus (ARB-4), underway near Baltimore, Maryland, 18 April 1944, after completion of conversion to a Battle Damage Repair Ship. Note the 3"/50 gun on the stern with the 40 mm quad mount just forward of and above it.

History

United States
- Name: LST-132; Zeus
- Namesake: Zeus
- Builder: Chicago Bridge and Iron Company, Seneca, Illinois
- Laid down: 17 June 1943
- Launched: 26 October 1943
- Commissioned: 11 April 1944
- Decommissioned: 30 August 1946
- Stricken: 1 June 1973
- Identification: Hull symbol: LST-132; Hull symbol: ARB-4; Code letters: NJXG
- Fate: Sold for merchant service, 1 August 1974

United States
- Name: Cape St. Elias
- Namesake: Cape St. Elias
- Owner: Snopac Enterprises
- Identification: IMO number: 8836273
- Fate: Sold, 1988

United States
- Name: Coastal Star
- Owner: Icicle Sea Foods
- Identification: IMO number: 8836273
- Fate: Sold, December 2007

United States
- Name: SNOPAC Innovator
- Owner: SNOPAC Products Inc.
- Renamed: Gorden Jensen, April 2012
- Identification: IMO number: 8836273; MMSI number: 367526070; Callsign: WDG3440
- Status: in active service

General characteristics
- Class & type: LST-1-class tank landing ship; Aristaeus-class battle damage repair ship
- Displacement: 1,781 long tons (1,810 t) (light); 4,100 long tons (4,200 t) (full)
- Length: 328 ft (100 m) oa
- Beam: 50 ft (15 m)
- Draft: 11 ft 2 in (3.40 m)
- Installed power: 2 × 900 hp (670 kW) Electro-Motive Diesel 12-567A diesel engines; 1,700 shp (1,300 kW)
- Propulsion: 1 × Falk main reduction gears; 2 × Propellers
- Speed: 11.6 kn (21.5 km/h; 13.3 mph)
- Complement: 20 officers, 234 enlisted men
- Armament: 1 × 3 in (76 mm)/50 caliber gun; 2 × quad 40 mm (1.57 in) Bofors guns; 8 × 20 mm (0.79 in) Oerlikon cannons

USS Zeus (ARB-4) was planned as a United States Navy LST-1-class tank landing ship, but was redesignated as one of twelve Aristaeus-class battle damage repair ships built for the United States Navy during World War II. Named for Zeus (in Greek mythology, the king of the gods, the ruler of Mount Olympus, and god of the sky and thunder), she was the only US Naval vessel to bear the name.

== Construction ==
The ship was laid down as LST-132 on 17 June 1943, at Seneca, Illinois, by the Chicago Bridge & Iron Company; launched on 26 October 1943; sponsored by Mrs. C. A. Brown, wife of Lieutenant C. A. Brown, USNR, who was assigned to the shipyard. With the reallocation of the ship to carry out battle damage repairs, the ship was named Zeus on 4 November 1943, and reclassified as ARB-4. The Maryland Drydock Co., Baltimore, Maryland, carried out the conversion work, and Zeus was commissioned at her conversion yard on 11 April 1944.

== Service history ==
Shifting to Port Covington, Baltimore, on 16 April 1944, to take on supplies and fuel, Zeus reported to Commander Amphibious Training, Atlantic Fleet, on 23 April, for shakedown. She sailed for the Naval Operating Base (NOB), Norfolk, on 24 April, and calibrated her radio direction finder en route. After taking on ammunition and supplies at NOB Norfolk (26 April), the ship departed at Lambert's Point, Norfolk, the following day (27 April), then began her shakedown on 28 April, conducting an eight-hour full power run on 29 April.

Anchoring off Cove Point, Solomons Island, Maryland, on 30 April 1944, Zeus carried out short range battle practice in Chesapeake Bay, firing at a moored sled target, her gun crews putting the weapons through their structural tests on 3 May, and conducted anti-aircraft warfare practice the next day. She then proceeded to the Norfolk Navy Yard on 5 May, for scheduled work.

Underway once more on 11 May 1944, Zeus fueled at Craney Island, Virginia, the following day, and the following morning received ammunition from a lighter moored alongside. She returned to NOB Norfolk and moored later that day. She took on board supplies and provisioned from the Naval Supply Depot, Norfolk, then reported to the Commander Service Force, Atlantic Fleet, for duty and for onward routing, on 14 May.

A little over a half hour after the start of the afternoon watch on 16 May 1944, Zeus got underway in company with the internal combustion engine repair ship Oahu, and the submarine chaser SC-706, their escort. The ships joined convoy 435, encountering a moderate sea on the beam that caused Zeus to roll quickly to 30 degrees. The convoy reached Guantánamo Bay, Cuba, without incident at 17:43 on 22 May, then sailed less than 24 hours later with convoy GZ-62, setting course for Panama.

Zeus made arrival at Cristóbal, Colón, Canal Zone, late on the morning of 27 May 1944, then transited the Panama Canal. The next day, she reported to Commander in Chief Pacific Fleet for duty and Commander Panama Sea Frontier for onward routing. On the morning of 29 May, Zeus sailed for San Diego, California, in company with Oahu. During the passage, a moderate sea on the beam again prompted the battle damage repair ship to roll – on this occasion to 35 degrees. On 5 June, Zeus fired an antiaircraft practice at balloons released by Oahu, then released balloons so that her consort could conduct firing later that same afternoon.

Reaching her destination on 10 June 1944, Zeus reported to Commandant Eleventh Naval District for onward routing. She fueled the next day, then shifted moorings the next morning, taking on fresh water and stores. She got underway on the morning of 14 June, sailing in company with Oahu, with the latter's captain, senior to Zeus's, becoming officer in tactical command (OTC). The next afternoon, the latter's reversing course left Zeus to proceed independently, but Oahu rejoined Zeus on the afternoon of 19 June, and the two ships proceeded together to their destination.

Arriving at Pearl Harbor, Territory of Hawaii, early on the afternoon on 23 June 1944, Zeus reported to Commander Service Force, Pacific Fleet (ComServPac), for duty, and received assignment to Service Squadron (ServRon) 2. Shifting to Ten-Ten Dock during the first dog watch the following day to begin a 48-hour availability, the battle damage repair ship loaded stores and provisions during that period, and received fresh water, ultimately sailing in convoy 4032A late in the afternoon watch on 27 June, setting course for the Marshall Islands. The ships proceeded toward Eniwetok, zig-zagging for an hour (16:00-17:00) on 1 July, and crossed the International Date Line at midnight on 3 July, advancing the calendar date to 4 July. The assemblage steered zig-zag courses again, beginning at 08:00 on 4 July, and ending at 19:00 the following day, then began zig-zagging again one hour later (20:00) on 5 July.

During the forenoon watch on 6 July 1944, however, an escort on the port side of the convoy obtained a sound contact, the alarm prompting the ships to make an emergency 45 degree turn to starboard at 10:53. Zeus went to general quarters at 10:56, after which time an escort dropped depth charges at 10:57. The battle damage repair ship resumed her original base course at 11:13, then secured from general quarters seven minutes later. The convoy resumed zig-zagging (11:30-15:30), suspended steering those courses for a brief period while one escort and two ships from the group left on duty assigned (15:40), then again began steering zig-zag courses twenty minutes later, with Zeus being ordered to assume a new position at 16:15. The passage proceeded uneventfully for a little over an hour, before an escort ahead of the disposition made a sound contact at 17:16, with general quarters being sounded again, with the convoy steering another emergency 45 degree turn to starboard. Subsequently, the disposition resumed steering zig-zag courses at 17:30, with Zeus standing down from general quarters two minutes later. The convoy continued its zig-zagging until noon on 8 July, then reached Eniwetok a little less than four hours later. Steering various courses and speeds to conform to the channel, Zeus anchored in berth 526 in the central anchorage at 18:45.

The following day, 9 July 1944, in compliance with orders received from ComServPac, Zeus reported to Commander ServRon 10 for duty. She shifted berths within the central anchorage that afternoon, dropping anchor in berth 562, then on 15 July, set about her work, carrying out repair work for her first three vessels: the infantry landing craft LCI-371, the motor minesweeper YMS-385, and the tank landing ship LST-38. Zeus shifted her berth to M-8 on 16 July, doing repairs for the escort carriers White Plains and Corregidor, then moved back to the central anchorage (berth 563) on 18 July, where she soon began repairs on the old tug Ontario and a landing craft (vehicle and personnel) (LCV(P)). For the remainder of the month, the ship carried out work on a variety of vessels ranging from two submarine chasers (SC-775 and SC-670) to three pontoon barges and a pair of target rafts.

Zeus's first full month of work at Eniwetok (August 1944) found her interrupted by Flash Red alerts that sent the ship to general quarters twice (04:05-04:28 on 5 August, and a fortnight later, on 19 August, from 22:25-22:50). The rest of her time that month continued to be occupied with repairs to 42 ships and small craft that ranged from the heavy cruiser New Orleans, the destroyer escorts Cloues, Parks, Riddle and Fair, and the minesweeper Captivate, to four LCV(P)s and five target rafts. During September, from her anchorage in berth 563 during the first half of the month, Zeus's work encompassed not only a tank landing ship, LST-684, but one of that ship's LCV(P)s as well, and ranged from 110-foot submarine chasers SC-759 and SC-775, 136-foot submarine chaser PCS-1457 and the 173-foot submarine chasers PC-1127 and PC-1135, to the big harbor tug Waneta, the water barge YW-88 and the garbage lighter YG-30. Zeus shifted to berth 579, still in the waters of Eniwetok's central anchorage, where, outside of a Flash Red that sent her to general quarters (15:53-16:04) on 21 September, she continued her toil, her customers ranging from the minesweeper Vigilance and salvage vessel Preserver to 12 LCV(P)s and three medium landing craft (LCM), one of which belonged to the cargo ship Ascella.

Remaining anchored in berth 579 into the month of October 1944, as the fleet prepared for the return to the Philippine Islands in the invasion of Leyte, Zeus provided repairs to ships and craft that ranged from minesweeper Capable, fleet ocean tug Lipan, and net-laying ship Mahogany to small coastal transports APc-110 and APc-111, the seaplane wrecking derrick YSD-36 and US Army Crash Boat 20989. Shifting to Eniwetok's south anchorage (berth K-1) at the end of the afternoon watch on 14 October, the battle damage repair ship conducted work on 26 vessels ranging from six 173-foot submarine chasers and three 110-footers, the miscellaneous auxiliary Gemsbok and big harbor tug Oconostota to two US Army crash boats and the Army small tug LT-392, during the second half of the month.

The first half of November 1944 proceeded without incident, Zeus continuing her vital repair work to units of the fleet – three dozen all told—from large to small, including six motor minesweepers and eight 173-foot submarine chasers. On 17 November, however, an hour before the end of the mid watch, the wind increased in velocity to 15–20 kn (28–37 km/h; 17–23 mph) – the ship would clock those during the rest of the day but occasionally reached 45 kn (83 km/h; 52 mph) for brief periods of time – and by the end of the morning watch (08:00) Zeus, with PC-600, old ocean tug Keosanqua, transport Gemini, and non-self-propelled covered lighter YF-385 moored alongside to starboard at the time—was dragging her anchor. PC-600 got underway and cast off immediately. Zeus employed her engines "to ease [the] strain on the chain" until Gemini's black gang lit off her propulsion plant, permitting her to get underway, too. Zeus shifted back to K-1, anchoring at 13:50.

Zeus's clientele expanded to include the steel-hulled floating dry dock AFD-21 – the type suitable for docking minesweepers (AM) and net-laying ships (AN) – as well as to the concrete-hulled storage barge Lignite, during the first week of December 1944. At the end of that period, the battle damage repair ship got underway for the first extended period of time – albeit brief – since her arrival at Eniwetok. She upped anchor and fired antiaircraft practices, her gunners on all of her battery, from 3-inch (76 mm) to 40-and-20-millimetre (1.57 and 0.79 in) weapons, firing at towed sleeves twice on 7 December, and once the following day, before she returned to K-1 at 10:59 on 8 December. Her customers ranged from the destroyer Meade, seven destroyer escorts of various types and classes, to miscellaneous auxiliaries (IX), four 173-foot submarine chasers, motor minesweepers, floating dry dock AFD-19, and the War Shipping Administration EC2-S-C1 type cargo vessel Philip Livingston, a total of 37 vessels.

The ship's workload clearly reflected the pace of the war, such as the invasion of Luzon, and of the many types and classes of naval vessels involved as the New Year 1945 began. During January 1945, Zeus's skilled specialists forged ahead through work on 77 ships of 21 different types and classes, the most numerous being destroyer escorts (11), followed by tank landing ships (9) and 173-foot submarine chasers (PCs) (8). Small craft serviced included 11 LCMs. She also provided repairs to three War Shipping Administration (WSA) Victory Ships, and the WSA, US-registry troop ship Cape Newenham.

During February 1945, Zeus serviced 108 naval vessels of 34 different types, including battleship New York and aircraft carrier Bunker Hill, the most numerous vessels needing repairs being destroyer escorts (17), wooden-hulled motor minesweepers (14), 173-foot submarine chasers (13) and tank landing ships (8). Some 18 WSA ships required varying degrees of work as well. Toward the end of that month, Lt. Groves, Zeus's commanding officer, assumed the duties of ComServRon 10 representative and administrative senior officer present afloat (SOPA) at Eniwetok, relieving Oahu's commanding officer of those responsibilities, on 24 February.

Zeus provided repairs to 35 different types of US Navy ships and craft, totaling 81 vessels, during March 1945. The more numerous of those included 22 173-foot submarine chasers (in addition to 11 of the 110-foot wooden class), 22 tank landing craft (LCT), 15 destroyer escorts, 15 motor minesweepers, 14 fleet minesweepers and ten LSTs. In addition, 39 WSA ships received repairs, as did one US Army inter-island freighter, FS-374.

As the war moved closer to the Japanese homeland with the invasion of Okinawa, during April 1945, Zeus performed repairs to 101 US Navy vessels of 31 different types (the most numerous type of ship being destroyer escorts – 13 – and 11 PCs) in addition to 18 WSA ships. Early in that month, on 8 April, Oahu's commanding officer relieved Zeus's Lt. Groves as administrative SOPA at Eniwetok. Two days later, the ship shifted her anchorage from J-3 to L-3, and on 21 April, in compliance with orders from ComServRon 10, reported to Commander Marshalls-Gilberts Area for temporary duty.

During May 1945, Zeus serviced 69 US Navy ships and craft, representing 28 different types, from berth L-3, in addition to seven WSA vessels. In June, the battle damage repair ship worked on 74 naval ships and craft, 27 types ranging from nine PC, seven YMS, and six DE, to a transport and a non-self-propelled floating workshop (YR), in addition to 11 WSA vessels and one small US Army tug. During July, still lying anchored in berth L-3, Zeus repaired 82 US Navy ships, nine WSA and one small US Army freighter, FS-230. On 2 July, ComServDiv 102 (formerly ComServRon 10 Representative ABLE) assumed duties as the administrative SOPA at Eniwetok, in Argonne, and Zeus reported to ComServDiv 102 one week later, on 9 July, for temporary operational control.

The relentless pressure upon the Japanese Empire continued into August 1945, while Zeus continued her work out of Eniwetok, shifting her anchorage from L-3 to berth 552 on 13 July. In the wake of atomic bombs on Hiroshima and Nagasaki, Japan finally agreed to the terms put forth in the Potsdam Declaration, and indicated its willingness to surrender. The end of hostilities, however, meant no cessation of the repair ship's work, and during the month of August her artificers toiled on 67 vessels of 21 types, the most numerous being infantry landing craft (LCI) – 13 of them – in addition to 30 medium landing craft (LCM) from the local boat pool.

With the Japanese surrender on 2 September 1945, however, Zeus's workload decreased to 39 naval vessels of 16 types, the most numerous being barracks ships (APL) – seven in all, with no WSA or US Army vessels worked-on. During October, Zeus conducted work on 41 ships of 23 types, in addition to the marine railway at Parry Island and a British ship, HMS Letitia (F16). Also during that month, Zeus entered the floating dry dock ARD-30 for a brief period of repairs (22-23 October), returning to berth 552 to resume her work. In November, the battle damage repair ship worked on 45 naval vessels (the most numerous again being APLs) and two WSA ships, shifting her berth twice, to berth 564 on 5 November and back to L-3 on 12 November.

Zeus departed Eniwetok a little over an hour into the forenoon watch on 6 December 1945, set course for the west coast of the United States. After a "quiet and uneventful" passage, the battle damage repair ship reached San Pedro Bay, California, on Christmas morning 1945, finding "various units of the United States Fleet, local defense craft, and merchantmen…” there. She reported her arrival to Commander Western Sea Frontier, Commandant Eleventh Naval District, and Commander Naval Base, Terminal Island. Her repair work in December had encompassed only four ships: the destroyer Hyman, cargo ship Hidalgo and two barracks ships, APL-47 and APL-2.

Zeus remained at San Pedro through mid-March 1946, spending part of that time providing repairs to a quartet of destroyer escorts – Johnnie Hutchins, Rombach, Gentry and Traw. Shifting to the Ammunition Depot at Seal Beach, California, on 19 March, she discharged ammunition there until the following morning, at which point she got underway again and proceeded to San Diego. Assigned to the 19th Reserve Fleet, Zeus remained at San Diego, ultimately moored at the Naval Repair Base there, for the remainder of her commissioned service.

On 30 August 1946, as she lay alongside the internal combustion engine repair ship Culebra Island, Zeus was placed out of commission and berthed at San Diego with the Pacific Reserve Fleet. She remained in reserve until 1 June 1973, at which time her name was stricken from the Naval Vessel Register.

== Commercial service ==
Zeus was sold 1 August 1974, by the Defense Reutilization and Marketing Service to Mickey Jones for commercial service as a salmon processor and freight ship, whereupon she was renamed Cape St. Elias. She was sold to Snopac Products in 1986, for service as a frozen fish freighter in Alaska. Again sold in 1988 to Icicle Seafoods, she was renamed Coastal Star, and served as a seafood processing ship in Alaska. In December 2005, she was resold to Snopac Products, renamed Snopac Innovator. In 2012 she was again resold to Icicle Seafoods, renamed Gordon Jensen and continues in service as a seafood processing ship.

== Bibliography ==
Online resources

- "Zeus I (ARB-4)". Dictionary of American Naval Fighting Ships. Naval History and Heritage Command. 7 March 2016. This article incorporates text from this source, which is in the public domain.
- "USS Zeus (ARB-4)". NavSource. 7 August 2015.
