= USS Demeter =

U.S. Navy battle damage repair ship

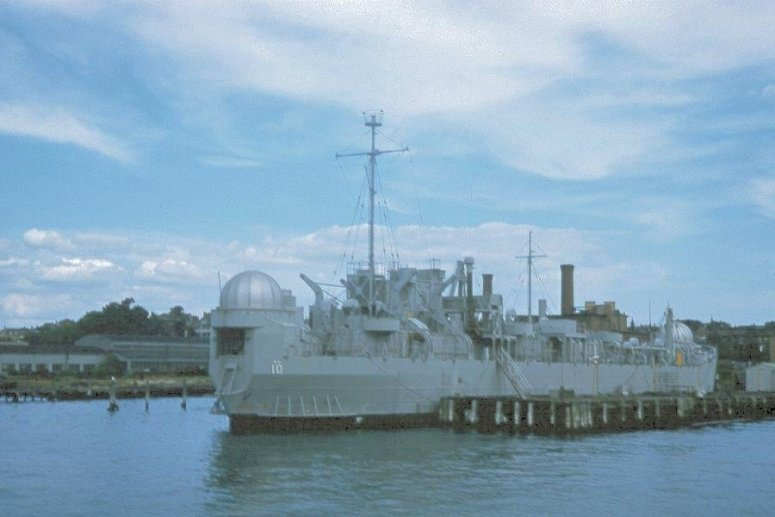
- USS Demeter (ARB-10), laid up in reserve at East Boston Naval Annex, September 1960.

History

United States
- Name: LST-1121; Demeter
- Namesake: Demeter
- Builder: Chicago Bridge & Iron Company, Seneca, Illinois
- Laid down: 25 October 1944
- Launched: 19 January 1945
- Commissioned: 31 January 1945, reduced commission; 3 July 1945, full commission
- Decommissioned: 2 March 1945; 27 May 1947
- Identification: Hull symbol: LST-1121; Hull symbol: ARB-10; Code letters: NJMJ
- Fate: Placed in service in reserve, 27 May 1947, at Green Cove Springs Group; Sold, 3 September 1959; Resold for merchant service, 1961

United States
- Name: Motonave; Demeter
- Fate: Sunk, 12 January 1964

General characteristics
- Class & type: LST-542-class tank landing ship; Aristaeus-class battle damage repair ship
- Displacement: 1,781 long tons (1,810 t) light; 3,960 long tons (4,020 t) full load
- Length: 328 ft (100 m) oa
- Beam: 50 ft (15 m)
- Draft: 11 ft 2 in (3.40 m)
- Installed power: 2 × 900 hp (670 kW) Electro-Motive Diesel 12-567A diesel engines; 1,800 shp (1,300 kW)
- Propulsion: 1 × Falk main reduction gears; 2 × Propellers
- Speed: 11.6 kn (21.5 km/h; 13.3 mph)
- Complement: 15 officers, 271 enlisted men
- Armament: 2 × quad 40 mm (1.57 in) Bofors guns; 8 × single 20 mm (0.79 in) Oerlikon cannons

USS Demeter (ARB-10) was planned as a United States Navy LST-542-class tank landing ship, but was redesignated as one of twelve Aristaeus-class battle damage repair ships built for the United States Navy during World War II. Named for Demeter (the Greek goddess of agriculture), she was the only US Naval vessel to bear the name.

== Construction ==
Laid down as LST-1121 on 25 October 1944, by the Chicago Bridge & Iron Company of Seneca, Illinois; launched 19 January 1945; sponsored by Mrs. W. B. Wynn; placed in partial commission on 31 January 1945, under the command of Lieutenant P. P. Wynn, USNR; sailed down the Mississippi River on her way to Baltimore, where she was decommissioned on 2 March 1945, for conversion to a battle damage repair ship; and commissioned as Demeter (ARB-10) on 3 July 1945.

== Service history ==
Demeter called at San Diego, from 1 to 6 September 1945, and arrived at Pearl Harbor ten days later. She embarked passengers for the United States and sailed 11 October, for the east coast, arriving at Charleston, South Carolina, on 11 November. She arrived at Green Cove Springs, Florida, on 27 November, and was placed in service in reserve on 27 May 1947, to provide services there to the reserve fleet group. Demeter was sold on 3 September 1959.

Resold in 1961, for merchant service and renamed Motonave, the ship was later renamed Demeter (date unknown). She sank on 12 January 1964.

== Bibliography ==
Online resources

- "Demeter". Dictionary of American Naval Fighting Ships. Naval History and Heritage Command. This article incorporates text from this source, which is in the public domain.
- "USS Demeter (ARB-10)". NavSource. 10 February 2017.
