= USS Phaon =

1942 LST-1 class American tank landing ship

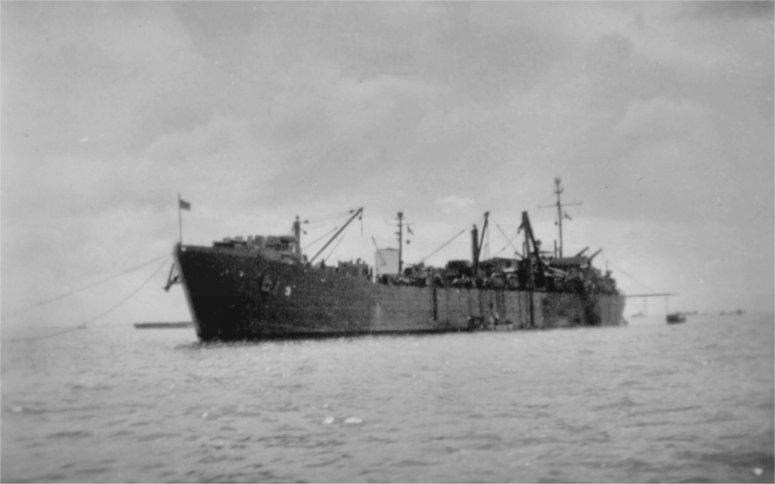
- USS Phaon (ARB-3), moored to a buoy in the harbor at Saipan, c. late 1944 to early August 1945.

History

United States
- Name: LST-15; Phaon
- Namesake: Phaon
- Builder: Dravo Corporation, Neville Island, Pennsylvania
- Laid down: 17 September 1942
- Launched: 30 January 1943
- Sponsored by: Mrs. Marion D. Calabreeze
- Commissioned: 5 August 1943
- Decommissioned: January 1947
- Reclassified: Battle Damage Repair Ship, 25 January 1943
- Stricken: 1 July 1961
- Identification: Hull symbol: LST-15; Hull symbol: ARB-3; Code letters: NJXD
- Honors and awards: 3 × battle stars (World War II)
- Fate: Laid up in the Pacific Reserve Fleet, San Diego, California; Sold for scrapping, 8 July 1962

General characteristics
- Class & type: LST-1-class tank landing ship; Aristaeus-class battle damage repair ship
- Displacement: 1,781 long tons (1,810 t) (light); 4,100 long tons (4,200 t) (full)
- Length: 328 ft (100 m) oa
- Beam: 50 ft (15 m)
- Draft: 11 ft 2 in (3.40 m)
- Installed power: 2 × 900 hp (670 kW) Electro-Motive Diesel 12-567A diesel engines; 1,700 shp (1,300 kW)
- Propulsion: 1 × Falk main reduction gears; 2 × Propellers
- Speed: 11.6 kn (21.5 km/h; 13.3 mph)
- Complement: 20 officers, 234 enlisted men
- Armament: 1 × 3 in (76 mm)/50 caliber gun; 2 × quad 40 mm (1.57 in) Bofors guns; 8 × 20 mm (0.79 in) Oerlikon cannons

Service record
- Operations: Gilbert Islands operation; Gilbert and Marshall Islands campaign (20 November–8 December 1943); Marianas operation; Capture and occupation of Saipan (19 June–10 August 1944); Tinian capture and occupation (24 July–1 August 1944)
- Awards: Combat Action Ribbon; American Campaign Medal; Asiatic–Pacific Campaign Medal; World War II Victory Medal

USS Phaon (ARB-3) was planned as a United States Navy LST-1-class tank landing ship, but was redesignated as one of twelve Aristaeus-class battle damage repair ships built for the United States Navy during World War II. Named for Phaon (in Greek mythology, a boatman of Mitylene in Lesbos), she was the only US Naval vessel to bear the name.

== Construction ==
Laid down as LST-15 on 17 September 1942, by the Dravo Corporation in Pittsburgh, Pennsylvania; reclassified as a battle damage repair ship 25 January 1943; launched 30 January 1943; sponsored by Mrs. Marion D. Calabreeze; converted at Tampa, Florida, by the Tampa Shipbuilding Company for service as a battle damage repair ship; and commissioned 5 August 1943.

== Service history ==
As an ex-LST, Phaon had heavier armament, greater deck facilities for cargo handling, and a much longer superstructure deck, though in this case the tank deck was covered with lathes, grinders, drills, metal cutters, welding machines and other shop equipment not found on an LST.

After shakedown to New Orleans, and final fitting out there, she sailed 3 September, via Guantanamo Bay and the Panama Canal for Samoa, anchoring in Pago Pago Harbor on 13 October.

From Samoa, Phaon moved to Funafuti in the Ellice Islands, arriving there shortly after the occupation of that island on 18 October. There, she repaired LCTs, pontoon barges, and patrol torpedo (PT) boats. She restored many craft used in the invasion of Tarawa, Gilbert Islands.

From Funafuti, Phaon advanced westward to Majuro in the Marshall Islands, arriving 6 February 1944, shortly after the invasion. Here, in the same harbor with one of the mightiest fleets ever assembled, Phaon worked on minelayers, tankers, minesweepers, destroyers, and small boats (LCVPs and LCMs). On 18 March 1944, Phaon weighed anchor again, proceeded via Kwajalein to Eniwetok in the Marshalls, arriving 23 March for repair work on small boats, LCTs, and yard minesweepers.

On 9 June 1944, Phaon left Eniwetok, arriving on 15 June, at Saipan, for the invasion. There, on "D-Day" plus three, the destroyer Phelps came alongside for repairs and many other ships thereafter. As metalsmiths, mechanics, and carpenters from Phaon swarmed over Phelps repairing the damaged boiler, blower, deck and bulkheads, the sturdy warship was still very much in the fight, blasting away at enemy troops and pillboxes.

On 24 June, during an air raid by Japanese G4M "Betties", Phaon suffered a near-miss on the starboard side. The damage to the ship was not very serious but the shrapnel fragments killed two of her men and injured eleven others. That day, she worked on a PCS and two LCIs, also repairing other small craft in preparation for the invasion of Tinian. On 24 July, the morning of the Tinian invasion, the destroyer Norman Scott came alongside, with numerous dead and wounded officers and men. She had suffered several direct hits from a Japanese six-inch (152 mm) shore battery and her bridge was practically torn away. While Phaon's medical department cared for the wounded, her repair department patched up the ship, enabling Norman Scott to pull away two days later.

The securing of Saipan by no means ended Phaon's work there. Saipan was her last invasion, but she prepared and repaired ships for Iwo Jima, Okinawa, and the Philippines. During the month between the invasions of Iwo Jima and Okinawa, Phaon worked on 96 different ships. After V-J Day, her work was still far from finished and she continued repairing and overhauling the ships that needed it.

On 28 December 1945, Phaon was ordered back to the United States. In 29 months away, she had completed approximately 2,000 repair jobs, on almost everything from small boats to battleships.

== Post-war service ==
Phaon was assigned to Operation Crossroads, the atomic bomb tests at Bikini Atoll, in July 1946, with the Repair and Service Unit.

She was decommissioned and placed in reserve on 15 January 1947, berthed at San Diego, struck from the Naval Vessel Register on 1 July 1961, and sold for scrapping on 8 July 1962 to Zidell Explorations, Inc. of Portland, Oregon.

== Awards ==
Phaon received three battle stars for World War II service.

== Bibliography ==
- "Phaon". Dictionary of American Naval Fighting Ships. Naval History and Heritage Command. 20 August 2015. This article incorporates text from this source, which is in the public domain.
- "USS Phaon (ARB-3)". NavSource. 19 February 2016.
