= USS Oceanus =

1943 Aristaeus-class battle damage repair ship

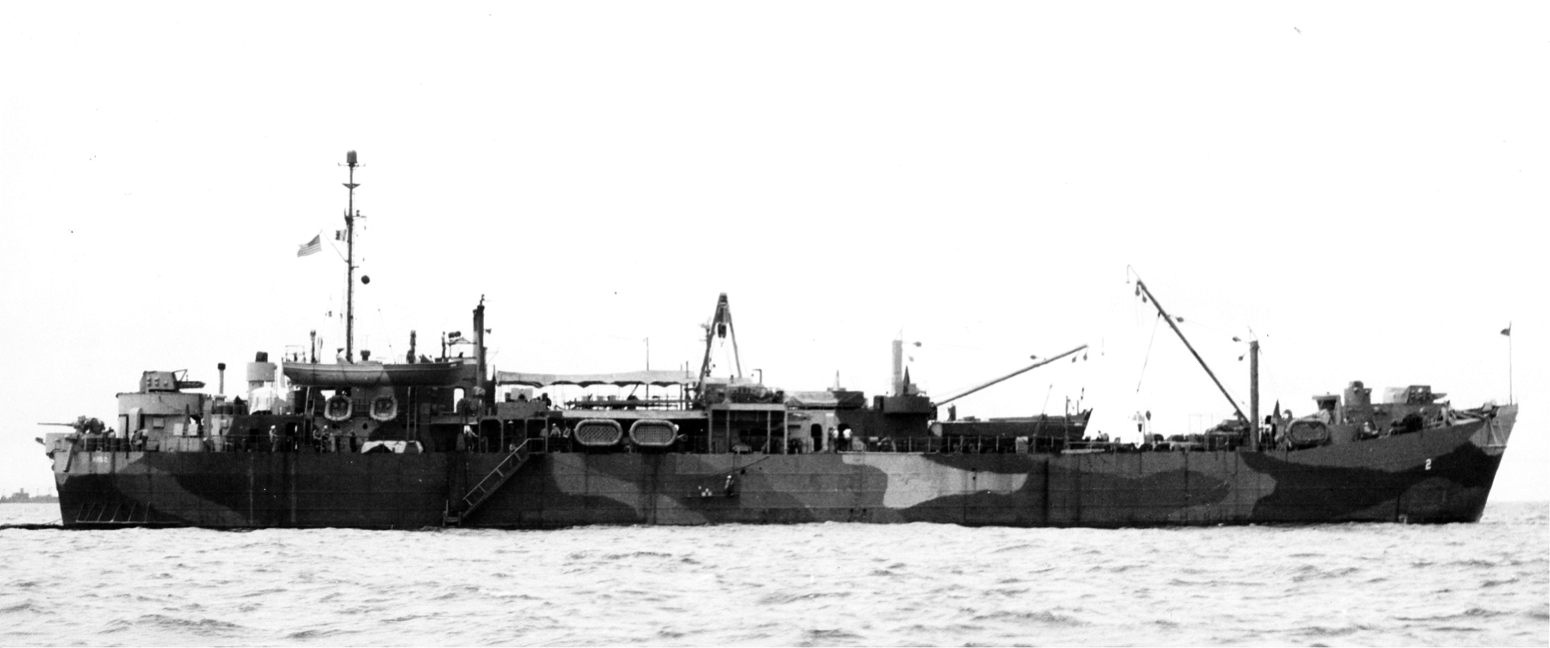
- USS Oceanus (ARB-2) at anchor, date and location unknown. Note Oceanus is painted Camouflage Measure 31, Design 11L.

History

United States
- Name: LST-328; Oceanus
- Namesake: Oceanus
- Builder: Philadelphia Navy Yard, Philadelphia, Pennsylvania
- Laid down: 12 November 1942
- Launched: 11 February 1943
- Commissioned: 22 May 1943
- Decommissioned: January 1947
- Reclassified: Battle Damage Repair Ship, 25 January 1943
- Stricken: 1 July 1961
- Identification: Hull symbol: LST-328; Hull symbol: ARB-2; Code letters: NJXA
- Honors and awards: 1 × battle stars (World War II)
- Fate: Laid up in the Pacific Reserve Fleet, San Diego, California; Sold for scrapping, 3 May 1962

General characteristics
- Class & type: LST-1-class tank landing ship; Aristaeus-class battle damage repair ship
- Displacement: 1,781 long tons (1,810 t) (light); 4,100 long tons (4,200 t) (full)
- Length: 328 ft (100 m) oa
- Beam: 50 ft (15 m)
- Draft: 11 ft 2 in (3.40 m)
- Installed power: 2 × 900 hp (670 kW) Electro-Motive Diesel 12-567A diesel engines; 1,700 shp (1,300 kW)
- Propulsion: 1 × Falk main reduction gears; 2 × Propellers
- Speed: 11.6 kn (21.5 km/h; 13.3 mph)
- Complement: 20 officers, 234 enlisted men
- Armament: 1 × 3 in (76 mm)/50 caliber gun; 2 × quad 40 mm (1.57 in) Bofors guns; 8 × 20 mm (0.79 in) Oerlikon cannons

USS Oceanus (ARB-2) was planned as a United States Navy LST-1-class tank landing ship, but was redesignated as one of twelve Aristaeus-class battle damage repair ships built for the United States Navy during World War II. Named for Oceanus (believed to be the world-ocean in classical antiquity), she was the only US Naval vessel to bear the name.

== Construction ==
The ship was laid down as LST–328 on 12 November 1942, at the Philadelphia Navy Yard; redesignated ARB-2 on 25 January 1943, she was then launched on 11 February 1943, and commissioned on 22 May 1943.

== Service history ==
Following shakedown in Chesapeake Bay, Oceanus departed Norfolk, Virginia on 23 July 1943 for the Pacific, arriving at Nouméa, New Caledonia 18 September. She remained there, converting LCIs to shoal-draft gunboats and making emergency repairs to damaged vessels. On 28 October, she shifted to Espiritu Santo, thence, departing on 1 July 1944, to Florida Island. On 9 September 1944, she departed the Solomon Islands in TG 31.4 and on 20 September, arrived at Kossol Roads, Palaus. There she repaired, often while underway, craft and vessels damaged in the assaults against those islands and against the Philippines. In February 1945, she steamed to Guam to join TG 51.5 for the Iwo Jima invasion, arriving on 20 February, and remaining until 17 March.

The Okinawa campaign next took Oceanus to Kerama Retto, where work on ships damaged by kamikazes and bombs kept her on a round-the-clock schedule into mid-May. On 14 May, she shifted to the Hagushi anchorage for emergency repairs to the battleship New Mexico. Completing the work and returning to Kerama Retto's "Scrap Iron Row" on 21 May, she remained until early June when she steamed to the Philippines.

Arriving at Leyte 15 June, she remained in San Pedro Bay until after the end of the War.

== Post-war ==
Post-war duties took her to Okinawa, then to China. At Shanghai from October into December, she serviced landing and patrol craft assigned to China Group. On 25 December, she headed back to the United States to prepare for inactivation. Decommissioned 15 January 1947, she was berthed at San Diego, as a unit of the Pacific Reserve Fleet until struck from the Naval Vessel Register 1 July 1961, and sold 3 May 1962 to Zidell Exploration of Portland, Oregon for scrapping.

== Awards ==
Oceanus earned one battle stars for World War II service.

== Bibliography ==
Online resources

- "Oceanus". Dictionary of American Naval Fighting Ships. Naval History and Heritage Command. 17 August 2015. This article incorporates text from this source, which is in the public domain.
- "USS Oceanus (ARB-2)". NavSource. 2 December 2016.
