= USS LST-50 =

1943 LST-1-class tank landing ship

History

United States
- Name: USS LST-50
- Builder: Dravo Corporation, Pittsburgh, Pennsylvania
- Laid down: 29 August 1943
- Launched: 16 October 1943
- Commissioned: 27 November 1943
- Decommissioned: 6 February 1946
- Reclassified: USS ARB-13 (Battle Damage Repair Ship), 14 November 1952
- Stricken: 8 September 1952
- Honours and awards: 3 battle stars (WWII)
- Fate: Transferred to Norway, 1952

Norway
- Name: HNoMS Ellida
- Acquired: 1952
- Identification: A534
- Fate: Returned to the United States, 1 July 1960

Greece
- Name: Sakipia
- Acquired: 16 September 1960
- Identification: A329
- Fate: Unknown

General characteristics
- Class & type: LST-1-class tank landing ship
- Displacement: 1,625 long tons (1,651 t) light; 4,080 long tons (4,145 t) full
- Length: 328 ft (100 m)
- Beam: 50 ft (15 m)
- Draft: Unloaded: Bow: 2 ft 4 in (0.71 m); Stern: 7 ft 6 in (2.29 m); Loaded : Bow: 8 ft 2 in (2.49 m); Stern: 14 ft 1 in (4.29 m)
- Depth: 8 ft (2.4 m) forward, 14 ft 4 in (4.37 m) aft (full load)
- Propulsion: 2 General Motors 12-567 diesel engines, two shafts, twin rudders
- Speed: 12 knots (22 km/h; 14 mph)
- Boats & landing craft carried: Two or six LCVPs
- Troops: 14-16 officers, 131-147 enlisted men
- Complement: 7-9 officers, 104-120 enlisted men
- Armament: 2 × twin 40 mm gun mounts w/Mk.51 directors; 4 × single 40 mm gun mounts; 12 × single 20 mm gun mounts

USS LST-50 was an LST-1-class tank landing ship built for the United States Navy during World War II.

LST-50 was laid down on 29 August 1943 at Pittsburgh, Pennsylvania by the Dravo Corporation; launched on 16 October 1943; sponsored by Mrs. Tito Tarquinio; and commissioned on 27 November 1943.

== Service history ==
=== US Navy, 1942–1946 ===
The tank landing ship was initially assigned to the European Theater and participated in the invasion of Normandy between 6 and 25 June 1944 and the invasion of southern France between 15 August and 25 September 1944. She was later transferred to the Asiatic-Pacific Theater of operations where she took part in the Okinawa assault between 18 and 30 June 1945. Following the war, LST-50 performed occupation duty in the Far East until early February 1946. Upon her return to the United States, the ship was decommissioned on 6 February 1946 and was struck from the Naval Vessel Register on 8 September 1952.

=== Norway & Greece, 1952– ===
On 14 November 1952, she was redesignated USS ARB-13 and transferred to Norway as HNoMS Ellida (A534). She was returned to the United States on 1 July 1960, but was retransferred to Greece on 16 September 1960 and served with the Greek Navy as Sakipia (A329). Her final fate is unknown.

LST-50 earned three battle stars for World War II service.
