= Maryland Drydock Company =

Former shipbuilding company in Baltimore, Maryland

- Type: Defunct (1984)
- Industry: Shipbuilding
- Founded: 1920
- Headquarters: Baltimore, Maryland, USA
- Services: Ship construction, upgrades, conversions and repairs
- Parent: Fruehauf Trailer Corporation

The Maryland Drydock Company was a shipbuilding company that operated in Baltimore, Maryland during the 20th century.

The company started life in 1920 as the Globe Shipbuilding and Dry Dock Company of Maryland. Its president at this time was B. C. Cooke. The company bought land along the Patapsco River across the Bay from Fort McHenry. It later changed its name to the simpler "Maryland Drydock Company". Sometime after 1950, its name was changed again, to the Maryland Shipbuilding and Drydock Company.

Maryland Drydock specialized in ship conversions, upgrades and repairs rather than with shipbuilding per se. During World War II, the company was employed in the conversion of numerous warships built at other yards for the US war effort. Unlike many other shipbuilding companies of the period, it survived the postwar downturn in the shipbuilding industry.

In 1970, the company's yard in Baltimore was purchased by the Fruehauf Trailer Corporation which spent $30 million upgrading the site. Adverse economic conditions caused the yard to close in 1984 and much of the site was razed, although one drydock was preserved and was being used by Kurt Metal for the scrapping of old ships in 1995.

Not counting the many vessels "jumbosized" there, a total of at least eighteen vessels were built during the shipyard's history.

== List of vessels built by the company ==
This is an incomplete list.

- Gov. Harry W. Nice (ferry), keel laid September 15, 1937, launched December 11, 1937 and delivered to the Claiborne-Annapolis Ferry Company April 30, 1938. Later sold and used in Puget Sound.
- Gov. Herbert R. O'Conor (ferry), launched 1946, used in Puget Sound.
- M/V Islander (ferry), launched 1950.
- M/V North River, launched 1974, still in service for New York City DEP. (Photo).
