= USS Aristaeus =

1943 Aristaeus-class battle damage repair ship

- USS Aristaeus (ARB-1), overhead view while underway, date and location unknown.

History

United States
- Name: LST-329; Aristaeus
- Namesake: Aristaeus
- Builder: Philadelphia Navy Yard, Philadelphia, Pennsylvania
- Laid down: 12 November 1942
- Launched: 1 February 1943
- Sponsored by: Mrs. Arthur Taylor
- Commissioned: 18 May 1943
- Decommissioned: 15 January 1947
- Reclassified: Battle Damage Repair Ship, 26 January 1943
- Stricken: 1 July 1961
- Identification: Hull symbol: LST-329; Hull symbol: ARB-1; Code letters: NJWX
- Honors and awards: 1 × battle stars (World War II)
- Fate: Sold for scrapping, 14 March 1962

General characteristics
- Class & type: LST-1-class tank landing ship; Aristaeus-class battle damage repair ship
- Displacement: 1,781 long tons (1,810 t) (light); 4,100 long tons (4,200 t) (full)
- Length: 328 ft (100 m) oa
- Beam: 50 ft (15 m)
- Draft: 11 ft 2 in (3.40 m)
- Installed power: 2 × 900 hp (670 kW) Electro-Motive Diesel 12-567A diesel engines; 1,700 shp (1,300 kW)
- Propulsion: 1 × Falk main reduction gears; 2 × Propellers
- Speed: 11.6 kn (21.5 km/h; 13.3 mph)
- Complement: 20 officers, 234 enlisted men
- Armament: 1 × 3 in (76 mm)/50 caliber gun; 2 × quad 40 mm (1.57 in) Bofors guns; 8 × 20 mm (0.79 in) Oerlikon cannons

USS Aristaeus (ARB-1) was planned as a United States Navy LST-1-class tank landing ship, but was redesignated as one of twelve Aristaeus-class battle damage repair ships built for the United States Navy during World War II. The lead ship in her class, she was named for Aristaeus (in Greek mythology, the son of Apollo and the huntress Cyrene), the only US Naval vessel to bear the name.

== Construction ==
The ship was laid down as LST-329 on 12 November 1942, at the Philadelphia Navy Yard; reclassified ARB-1 on 25 January 1943; launched on 1 February 1943; sponsored by Mrs. Arthur Taylor; converted at Fairfield, Maryland, by the Maryland Drydock Company for service as a battle damage repair ship; and commissioned on 18 May 1943.

== Service history ==
On 1 June, the ship got underway for Norfolk, Virginia. During the next six weeks, she conducted shakedown training out of Norfolk and in the Chesapeake Bay. On 23 July, she left the east coast and shaped a course for the Pacific. The vessel transited the Panama Canal and joined the Pacific Fleet on 1 August. She then continued on via Bora Bora, the Society Islands, and Tutuila, American Samoa to Nouméa, New Caledonia.

Aristaeus reached Nouméa on 14 September, and operated in its immediate vicinity through the remainder of 1943, and the first six months of 1944. Early in July 1944, she anchored at Sydney, Australia. After upkeep at that port, the repair ship journeyed to New Guinea, in late September, and provided battle damage repairs to vessels in this area into April 1945. On 1 May, she anchored at Kerama Retto in the Ryukyu Islands.

The vessel remained at Kerama Retto during the next two months. As a member of Service Squadron (ServRon) 10, she performed battle damage and voyage repairs to various ships of the fleet. On 2 July, the ship moved her base of operations to Buckner Bay, Okinawa, where she provided routine repair services. On 13 August, she was ordered to assist in repairing the torpedoed battleship Pennsylvania. Many of Pennsylvania's compartments were flooded, and she had settled heavily by the stern. Aristaeus' repair efforts, however, enabled the battleship to get underway for Pearl Harbor on 24 August, nine days after the Japanese capitulation ended hostilities.

== Post-war service ==
Aristaeus remained at Buckner Bay until early December. She left Okinawa on 3 December, and shaped a course for the west coast of the United States. The ship reached San Francisco, California, on 27 December, and entered a period of upkeep and repairs. She remained at San Francisco until 22 May 1946, when she got underway for San Diego. Upon her arrival there, the vessel reported to the San Diego Group, 19th Fleet, for inactivation. Aristaeus was decommissioned on 15 January 1947, and was placed in the Pacific Reserve Fleet. Her name was struck from the Naval Vessel Register on 1 July 1961. The vessel was sold to Brown Industries, Inc. of Oakland, California on 14 March 1962, and was subsequently scrapped.

== Awards ==
Aristaeus earned one battle star for her World War II service.

== Bibliography ==
Online resources

- "Aristaeus (ARB-1)". Dictionary of American Naval Fighting Ships. Naval History and Heritage Command. 7 April 2016. This article incorporates text from this source, which is in the public domain.
- "USS Aristaeus (ARB-1)". NavSource. 1 July 2016.
