= List of shipwrecks in October 1945 =

The list of shipwrecks in October 1945 includes ships sunk, foundered, grounded, or otherwise lost during October 1945.

== 1 October ==
List of shipwrecks: 1 October 1945
Ship	State	Description
Empire Cormorant	United Kingdom	Loaded with obsolete chemical munitions, the cargo ship was scuttled 120 nautical miles (220 km; 140 mi) northwest of Ireland at 55°30′N 11°00′W.

== 3 October ==
List of shipwrecks: 3 October 1945
Ship	State	Description
Grenada	United Kingdom	World War II: The fishing vessel (183 GRT) was sunk by a mine in the North Sea 30 miles (48 km) south of the Old Head of Kinsale, County Cork, Ireland. Nine crewmen were killed. The only survivor was rescued by the British steamer Fort Souris (United Kingdom).

== 4 October ==
List of shipwrecks: 4 October 1945
Ship	State	Description
Duburg	Allied-occupied Germany	The cargo ship was scuttled in the North Sea.
Louise Schröder	Allied-occupied Germany	The cargo ship was scuttled in the Skagerrak with a cargo of poison gas munitions.
Muriel	Sweden	World War II: The cargo ship (1,296 GRT, 1918) struck a mine and sank off the Dutch coast with the loss of one crew.
Patagonia	Allied-occupied Germany	The cargo ship was scuttled in the Skagerrak with a cargo of poison gas munitions.
Pillau	Allied-occupied Germany	The cargo ship was scuttled in the Skagerrak.
Triton	United Kingdom	The cargo ship was scuttled off Jutland with a cargo of obsolete ammunition.

== 5 October ==
List of shipwrecks: 5 October 1945
Ship	State	Description
HMS MFV 118	Royal Navy	The MFV-1-class motor fishing vessel burned at Portsmouth.

== 6 October ==
List of shipwrecks: 6 October 1945
Ship	State	Description
Chales M. Hall	United States	The Liberty ship struck a submerged object and was damaged in the River Seine, France. She was subsequently withdrawn from service and laid up in the James River, Virginia, United States.
Glenn's Ferry	United States	The T2 tanker ran aground on Batag Island, Philippines, exploded and was burnt out. She was on a voyage from Los Angeles, California to Manila, Philippines.

== 7 October ==
List of shipwrecks: 7 October 1945
Ship	State	Description
Juta	United Kingdom	The cargo ship struck a rock and sank off the Welsh coast. All twenty crew were rescued by a naval trawler.
Westbank Park	Canada	The Park ship ran aground in Magdalena Bay, Baja California Sur, Mexico, and was wrecked.
USS YP-239	United States Navy	Typhoon Louise: The Yard Patrol Boat was wrecked in the typhoon.
USS YP-289	United States Navy	Typhoon Louise: The Yard Patrol Boat was wrecked in the typhoon.

== 8 October ==
List of shipwrecks: 8 October 1945
Ship	State	Description
Kiri Marti	Japan	The cargo ship ran aground in the Pacific Ocean on Miyake Shima. Survivors were rescued by USS Colahan (United States Navy).
Kuri	Imperial Japanese Navy	The Momi-class destroyer was sunk by a mine off Pusan, Korea, while serving as a minesweeper.
Patrol No. 3	United States	The 8-gross register ton, 33.3-foot (10.1 m) fishing vessel was destroyed by fire at the north end of Joe Island (55°32′N 131°43′W) on the east side of Grant Island (55.5539°N 131.718°W) in Clover Pass (55.4722°N 131.7917°W) in Southeast Alaska.

== 9 October ==
List of shipwrecks: 9 October 1945
Ship	State	Description
Brockholst Livingston	United States	Typhoon Louise: The Liberty ship was driven ashore in a typhoon at Okinawa, Japan. She was declared a total loss.
USCGC CG-83301	United States Coast Guard	Typhoon Louise: The cutter was wrecked in a typhoon at Okinawa, Japan.
USS Cinnabar	United States Navy	Typhoon Louise: The Trefoil-class concrete barge was driven aground at Baten Ko, Buckner Bay, Okinawa. Was struck from the Navy List and sold.
USS Dorsey	United States Navy	Typhoon Louise: The high-speed minesweeper, a former Wickes-class destroyer, was grounded by a typhoon off Okinawa. The wreck was destroyed on 1 January 1946.
USS Extricate	United States Navy	Typhoon Louise: The Anchor-class rescue and salvage ship was grounded by a typhoon off Okinawa. The wreck was destroyed with explosives on 4 March 1946.
FS-406	United States Army	Typhoon Louise: The Design 381 coastal freighter was driven ashore and wrecked in a typhoon at Okinawa.
USS Feldspar	United States Navy	Typhoon Louise: The Trefoil-class concrete barge was driven aground at Baten Ko, Okinawa. She was refloated and repaired such that she left Buckner Bay for Subic Bay, towed by USS Pawnee (United States Navy) on 25 January 1946.
USS Greene	United States Navy	Typhoon Louise: The high-speed transport, a former Clemson-class destroyer, was driven ashore in a typhoon on the north shore of Okinawa, Japan and was declared a constructive total loss. The wreck was destroyed on 11 February 1946.
Harrington Emerson	United States	Typhoon Louise: The Liberty ship was driven ashore in a typhoon at Okinawa and was wrecked.
BRL-3071	United States Army	Typhoon Louise: The 265 foot B5-BJ2 class concrete hulled barge was driven ashore in a typhoon at Okinawa. Attempts to pump her out occurred 24-28 October, but failed.
USS Industry	United States Navy	Typhoon Louise: The coastal minesweeper was driven ashore in a typhoon at Buckner Bay, Okinawa. The wreck was sunk in December 1945.
Jack Singer	United States	Typhoon Louise: The Liberty ship was driven ashore in a typhoon at Okinawa. She was declared a constructive total loss.
USS Lamberton	United States Navy	Typhoon Louise: The miscellaneous auxiliary, a former Wickes-class destroyer, was driven ashore in a typhoon at Okinawa. She was refloated and repaired.
USS Lignite	United States Navy	Typhoon Louise: The Trefoil-class concrete barge was driven aground Buckner Bay, Okinawa. She was refloated on 16 October.
USS LSM-15	United States Navy	Typhoon Louise: The LSM-1-class landing ship sank in a typhoon at the entrance to Buckner Bay, Okinawa when she rammed into USS YP-289 (United States Navy) detonating depth charges on the naval trawler's stern. Thirty-two survivors were rescued by the repair ship USS Vestal (United States Navy). Raised in 1957 and re-sunk in deeper water.
USS LSM-143	United States Navy	Typhoon Louise: The LSM-1-class landing ship went aground on a reef in a typhoon at the entrance to Buckner Bay, Okinawa.
USS LST-568	United States Navy	Typhoon Louise: The tank landing ship was driven aground during a typhoon at Okinawa. She was pulled off the next day. She went to the Philippines where she was decommissioned and stripped. The vessel was scuttled east of Samar on 7 March 1946.
USS LST-826	United States Navy	Typhoon Louise: The tank landing ship was driven aground during a typhoon at Okinawa. Her hulk was stripped and sold for scrapping in 1947.
USS Nestor	United States Navy	USS Nestor and USS Ocelot Typhoon Louise: The Aristaeus-class repair ship was driven aground in a typhoon off Okinawa. She was declared a total loss and consequently scrapped.
USS Ocelot	United States Navy	USS Ocelot Typhoon Louise: The Service Squadron command ship was wrecked in Buckner Bay, Okinawa, during a typhoon and was abandoned. The wreck was sold for scrap in 1948.
USS PC-590	United States Navy	Typhoon Louise: The PC-461-class patrol craft grounded on a reef, broke in two and sank in a typhoon in Buckner Bay, Okinawa, Japan. The hulk was destroyed on 23 February 1946.
USS PC-814	United States Navy	Typhoon Louise: The PC-461-class patrol craft foundered in a typhoon in Buckner Bay, Okinawa, Japan.
USS PC-1128	United States Navy	Typhoon Louise: The PC-461-class patrol craft grounded in a typhoon in Buckner Bay, Okinawa, Japan. 18 crew were lost. The wreck was destroyed in March 1946.
USS SC-636	United States Navy	Typhoon Louise: The SC-497-class submarine chaser foundered during a typhoon off Okinawa.
USS SC-999	United States Navy	Typhoon Louise: The SC-497-class submarine chaser driven ashore during a typhoon off Okinawa. The wreck was destroyed on 14 December 1945.
USS Silica	United States Navy	Typhoon Louise: The Trefoil-class concrete barge was grounded by a typhoon off Okinawa. She was struck from the Naval Vessel Register on 3 January 1946. Refloated and sunk in deeper water in 1947 or later.
USS Snowbell	United States Navy	Typhoon Louise: The Ailanthus-class net laying ship, was driven onto a reef off Okinawa in a typhoon and was declared a total loss. Her hulk was destroyed with explosives on 14 January 1946.
USS Southard	United States Navy	Typhoon Louise: The high-speed minesweeper, a former Clemson-class destroyer, was driven onto a reef off Tsuken Shima, Japan, in a typhoon and was declared a total loss.
USS Southern Seas	United States Navy	Typhoon Louise: The accommodation ship collided with five other vessels in Buckner Bay during a typhoon and sank off Okinawa with the loss of 13 crew members and one passenger.
USS Vandalia	United States Navy	Typhoon Louise: The tanker was driven ashore on Naha Island, Okinawa, and damaged beyond economical repair. She was abandoned on 20 November and sold for scrapping on 31 December.
USS Weehawken	United States Navy	Typhoon Louise: The minelayer sank at Tsuken Shima, Japan, during a typhoon. She broke in two a week later and was declared a total loss.
USS YMS-99	United States Navy	Typhoon Louise: The YMS-1-class minesweeper was driven ashore in a typhoon on Okinawa. The vessel was refloated on 2 November 1945 and destroyed in 1945 or 1946.
USS YMS-146	United States Navy	Typhoon Louise: The YMS-1-class minesweeper went aground on a reef in a typhoon in Buckner Bay, Okinawa, Japan.
USS YMS-383	United States Navy	Typhoon Louise: The YMS-1-class minesweeper foundered in a typhoon in Buckner Bay, Okinawa, Japan.
USS YMS-424	United States Navy	Typhoon Louise: The YMS-1-class minesweeper was driven ashore in a typhoon in Buckner Bay, Okinawa, Japan. The wreck was destroyed on 10 December 1945.
USS YMS-454	United States Navy	Typhoon Louise: The YMS-1-class minesweeper was driven ashore in a typhoon on Tsuken Island. The wreck was destroyed on 20 December 1945.
USS YP-239	United States Navy	Typhoon Louise: The naval trawler was driven ashore at Baten Ko, Buckner Bay, Okinawa.
USS YP-289	United States Navy	Typhoon Louise: The 110-foot (34 m) naval trawler was sunk when she was rammed into by USS LSM-15 (United States Navy) detonating depth charges on the naval trawler's stern in Buckner Bay, Okinawa.
USS YP-520	United States Navy	Typhoon Louise: The naval trawler was driven ashore and broke in half at Baten Ko, Buckner Bay, Okinawa.

== 10 October ==
List of shipwrecks: 10 October 1945
Ship	State	Description
Empire Gallery	United Kingdom	The cargo ship struck a mine in the Bay of Biscay 15 nautical miles (28 km) off Cordouan, Gironde, France. She was towed in to Le Verdon-sur-Mer, Gironde. Subsequently repaired and returned to service.

== 12 October ==
List of shipwrecks: 12 October 1945
Ship	State	Description
FS-163	United States Army	The Design 330 coastal freighter was lost in a typhoon, possibly in the South West Pacific Theatre.
HMT Loch Eribol	Royal Navy	The naval trawler collided off Start Point, Devon with Sidney Sherman (United States) and sank. The crew were rescued.

== 13 October ==
List of shipwrecks: 13 October 1945
Ship	State	Description
Oceana	United Kingdom	World War II: The cargo ship struck a mine in the North Sea off Heligoland (54°00′N 7°52′E and was damaged. She was on a voyage from Methil, Fife to Hamburg Allied-occupied Germany. She was towed in to Hamburg. Subsequently repaired and returned to service.

== 15 October ==
List of shipwrecks: 15 October 1945
Ship	State	Description
T-523	Soviet Navy	The T-181-class minesweeper was damaged by Japanese mines and declared a constructive total loss.
T-610	Soviet Navy	The T-181-class minesweeper was sunk by Japanese mines.
Zhong’anlun	China	The ferry, with 1,000 passengers aboard sank when crossing the Yangtze River. Some 800 people died.

== 16 October ==
List of shipwrecks: 16 October 1945
Ship	State	Description
Cassius Hudson	United States	The Liberty ship struck a mine in the Gulf of Trieste. She was taken in tow but struck another mine and sank (45°32′N 13°12′E).
Takliwa	United Kingdom	The cargo liner ran aground and then caught fire at Indira Point, Great Nicobar, Indonesia. All 1,083 on board were rescued by HMS Sainfoin (Royal Navy). The ship later broke up, a total loss.

== 17 October ==
List of shipwrecks: 17 October 1945
Ship	State	Description
Balkan	Allied-occupied Germany	The cargo ship was scuttled in the Skagerrak.
Drau	Allied-occupied Germany	The cargo ship was scuttled in the Skagerrak with a cargo of obsolete chemical ammunition.
Emmy Friederich	Allied-occupied Germany	The cargo ship was scuttled in the Skagerrak with a cargo of poison gas munitions.
Erika Schunemann	Allied-occupied Germany	The cargo ship was scuttled in the Skagerrak.
Joshua W. Alexander	United States	The Liberty ship was wrecked at The Graves, Massachusetts.
Kirov	Soviet Navy	The Kirov-class cruiser struck a mine in the Baltic Sea and was damaged. She was taken in to Kronstadt for repairs.
"Lord Beaconsfield"	United Kingdom	The 135-foot (41 m) trawler was wrecked in dense fog on rocks off Prail Castle one nautical mile (1.9 km; 1.2 mi) south west of Red Head, Auchmithie, Angus, Scotland. Crew rescued by the Arbroath lifeboat "John and William Mudie". Declared a Total Loss.
Olga Siemers	Allied-occupied Germany	The cargo ship was scuttled in the Skagerrak with a cargo of obsolete chemical ammunition.

== 20 October ==
List of shipwrecks: 20 October 1945
Ship	State	Description
Sergei Lazo	Soviet Union	The cargo ship ran aground at Tsun Wan, Hong Kong.
Simferopol	Soviet Union	The cargo ship was driven ashore at Tsun Wan. She was refloated in 1950 and scrapped.
Svirstroi	Soviet Union	The cargo ship ran aground at Tsun Wan. She was refloated in 1950 and scrapped.

== 21 October ==
List of shipwrecks: 21 October 1945
Ship	State	Description
Medford	United States	The trawler out of New Bedford, Massachusetts was cut in two by USAT Thomas H. Barry (United States Army) outbound from New York Port of Embarkation for Le Havre, France at about 40°41′N 67°18′W, 150 miles (241 km) east of New Bedford. Medford's casualties were one killed, six missing and ten rescued.

== 22 October ==
List of shipwrecks: 22 October 1945
Ship	State	Description
Kronprinsen	Norway	The cargo ship ran aground at Kirkwall, Orkney Islands, United Kingdom. She was later refloated and returned to service.

== 23 October ==
List of shipwrecks: 23 October 1945
Ship	State	Description
Transport	Belgium	The 140.4-foot (42.8 m), 342-ton trawler foundered in heavy weather off Buoy CH4 near the Noord Hinder lightship (51°37′N 03°18′E).

== 24 October ==
List of shipwrecks: 24 October 1945
Ship	State	Description
Charles C. Glover	United States	The Liberty ship ran aground in the Loire. She was refloated but declared a total loss.

== 25 October ==
List of shipwrecks: 25 October 1945
Ship	State	Description
Danegarth	United Kingdom	The tug collided with a floating lock gate in the Bristol Channel and sank with the loss of one crew member.

== 26 October ==
List of shipwrecks: 26 October 1945
Ship	State	Description
HMS Saltburn	Royal Navy	The Hunt-class minesweeper sank in the Solent in a gale after fouling the defense boom off Horse Sand Fort. 63 crew were rescued by the Bembridge Life Boat and 25 by the Selsey Lifeboat.
HMT Swarthy	Royal Navy	The tug sank in the Solent in a gale after fouling the defense boom off Horse Sand Fort whilst attempting to assist HMS Saltburn (Royal Navy). 14 crew were rescued by the lifeboat Jesse Lumb. Her master and two crew abandoned ship on a Carley float and came ashore near Longstone Harbor.

== 28 October ==
List of shipwrecks: 29 October 1945
Ship	State	Description
Moorwood	United Kingdom	The coaster struck a sunken wreck in the North Sea off the coast of Essex and holed. She was beached on the Maplin Sands. Moorwood was on a voyage from Blyth, Northumberland to London. She was refloated and completed her voyage. Subsequently repaired and returned to service.
Norteloide	Brazil	The cargo ship suffered an onboard explosion and caught fire off Cape São Thomé. She was taken in tow, but was abandoned off Macahe on 31 October. She came ashore between São Thomé and Macahe the next day and was a total loss.

== 29 October ==
List of shipwrecks: 29 October 1945
Ship	State	Description
I-363	Imperial Japanese Navy	World War II: The I-361-class submarine was sunk by a mine in the Philippine Sea off the coast of Miyazaki Prefecture, Japan, with the loss of 36 lives; 10 crewmen were rescued. The submarine was raised and scrapped in January 1966.

== 30 October ==
List of shipwrecks: 30 October 1945
Ship	State	Description
Wairuna	United Kingdom	Loaded with obsolete chemical munitions, the cargo ship was scuttled 120 nautical miles (220 km; 140 mi) northwest of Ireland at 55°30′N 11°00′W.

== Unknown date ==
List of shipwrecks: Unknown date October 1945
Ship	State	Description
HMIS Ahmedabad	Royal Indian Navy	The Basset-class trawler/minesweeper was driven ashore in a cyclone. Later refloated.
Ha-104	Imperial Japanese Navy	The captured Type SS submarine was scuttled off Shimizu, Japan.
