= USS Cinnabar =

History

United States
- Name: USS Cinnabar
- Laid down: 1944
- Launched: 18 March 1944
- Sponsored by: Mrs. Carl W. Flesher
- In service: 26 September 1944
- Stricken: 3 January 1946
- Fate: sold

General characteristics
- Class & type: Trefoil-class cargo barge
- Length: 366 feet
- Beam: 54 feet
- Propulsion: None
- Speed: Not self-propelled

USS Cinnabar (IX-163), a Trefoil-class concrete barge designated an unclassified miscellaneous vessel, was the only ship of the United States Navy to be named for cinnabar. Her keel was laid down in 1944. She was acquired on a loan-charter basis from the War Shipping Administration and placed in service at San Francisco, California, on 26 September 1944 under command of Lt. W. P. Loughsborough USNR.

== Service history ==
She was assigned to the Pacific Fleet, and in November 1944 departed the West Coast in tow for Pearl Harbor. With Service Squadron 8, and later Service Squadron 10, she issued general stores to advanced bases at Eniwetok, Espiritu Santo, Ulithi, Leyte. She was in route to Okinawa during the typhoon, breaking loose from her tow vessel and drifting 30 September to 2 October. On 9 October 1945 during Typhoon Louise she went aground at Baten Ko, Buckner Bay, Okinawa. She was stricken from the Naval Vessel Register on 3 January 1946, returned to the Maritime Commission at Okinawa. In May 1947, she was one of around 15 Okinawa wrecks sold in bloc to the Oklahoma-Philippines Trading Co. by State Department's Foreign Liquidations Commission. The sale was known as ‘The Berry Sale’. Future fate unknown.
