= USS Limestone =

History

United States
- Name: USS Limestone
- Builder: Barrett & Hilp, Belair Shipyard, San Francisco
- Laid down: 5 January 1944
- Launched: 25 March 1944
- Completed: 1 October 1944
- Acquired: 14 October 1944
- In service: 14 October 1944
- Out of service: 12 December 1946
- Fate: Sold, 11 September 1947

General characteristics
- Class & type: Trefoil-class cargo barge
- Displacement: 10,970 long tons (11,146 t)
- Length: 366 ft 4 in (111.66 m)
- Beam: 54 ft (16 m)
- Draft: 26 ft (7.9 m)
- Propulsion: None
- Speed: Not self-propelled
- Complement: 206 officers and men
- Armament: 1 × 40 mm AA gun; 4 × 20 mm AA guns

USS Limestone (IX-158), a Trefoil-class concrete barge designated an unclassified miscellaneous vessel, was the only ship of the United States Navy to be named for limestone, a rock consisting chiefly of calcium carbonate, which yields lime when burned.

The ship was laid down 5 January 1944 by Barrett & Hilp, Belair Shipyard, in San Francisco, under a Maritime Commission contract (MC Hull 1338), and named Corundum (IX-164) on 7 February 1944. Launched on 25 March 1944, sponsored by Mrs. Leo Heagerty, she was renamed and redesignated Limestone (IX-158) on 23 May 1944, acquired by the Navy on 14 October 1944, and placed in service the same day under command of Lt. W. T. Bresnahan USNR.

== Service history ==
Limestone was towed to Eniwetok via Majuro, by USS Ute arriving on 1st February 1945. She was placed out of service 12 December 1946 at Seattle, Washington, and was sold to Foss Launch and Tug Company on 11 September 1947 for $3,511.00. Converted by Todd Shipyards into a floating dock & was in use as such at the port of Anchorage, Alaska by July, 1960, possibly as a joint venture of Foss Launch and Tug Company and Alaska Aggregate Corporation. Ship may have been demolished in place to build a permanent pier.
