= Feldspar (disambiguation) =

Feldspar is a group of rock-forming minerals, including:

- Alkali feldspar
- Alkali feldspar granite
- Potassium feldspar

Feldspar may also refer to:

- A community in Tay Valley, Ontario, Canada
- USS Feldspar (IX-159), a concrete barge
- Craig Feldspar, a character in the American television comedy series Malcolm in the Middle
