= Chimariko =

Chimariko may refer to:

- Chimariko people, an indigenous people of California
- Chimariko language, an extinct language
- USS Chimariko (ATF-154), an American ship
