= Kyle and Company =

Shipyard in Stockton, California, United States

Coordinates: 37.9550582°N 121.29923°W

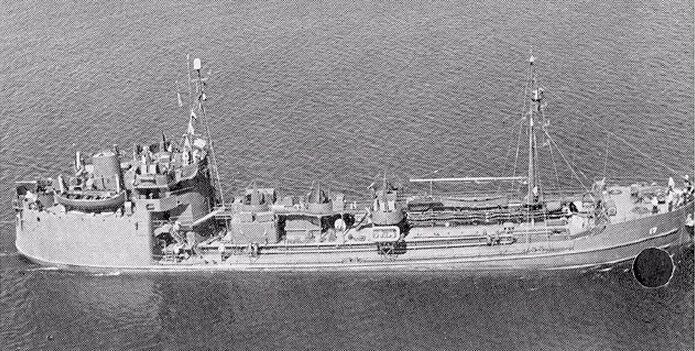
World War II coastal tanker

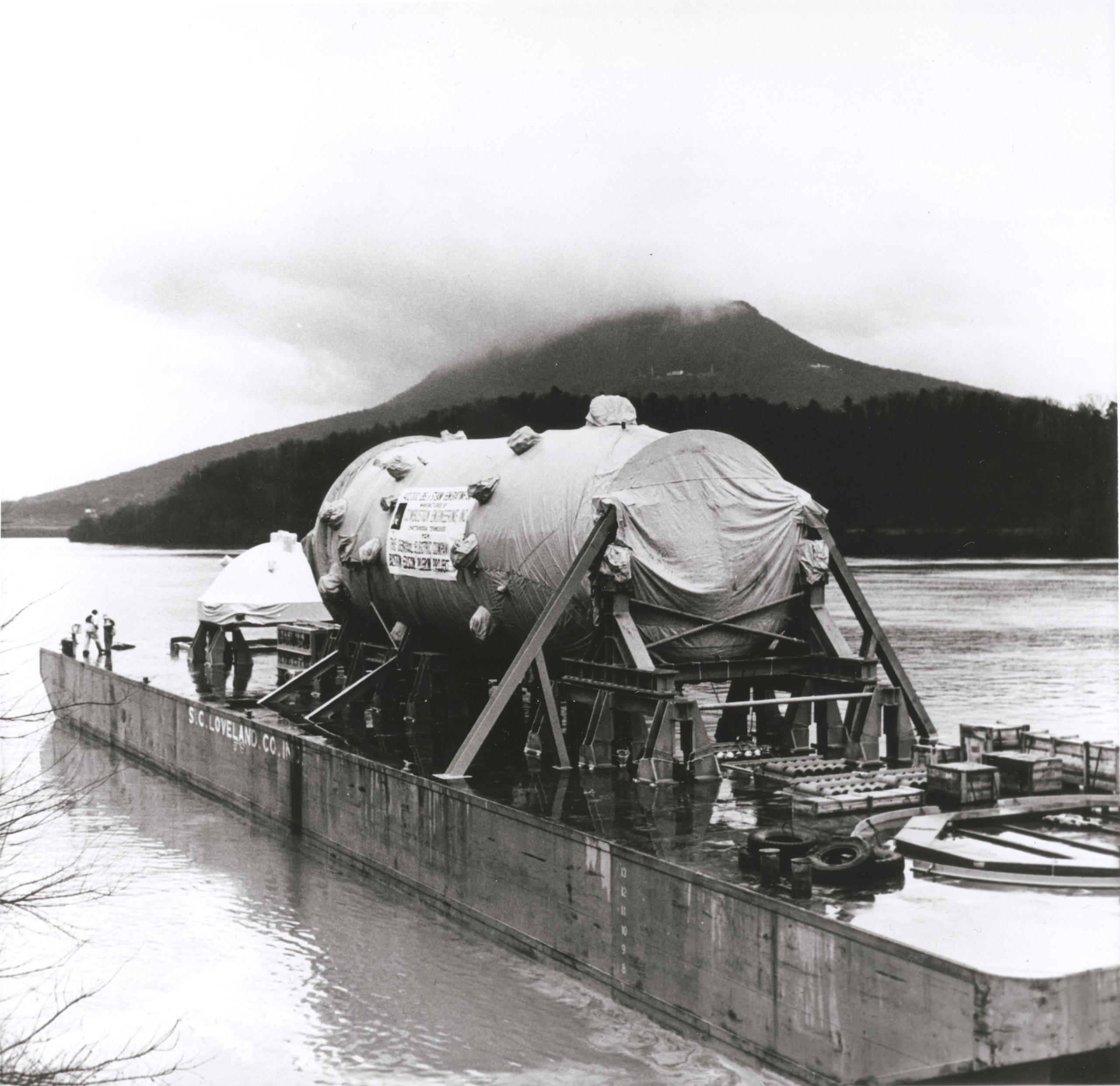
World War II type deck barge

Kyle & Company or Kyle & Co was a steel shipbuilding company in Stockton, California. To support the World War II demand for ships Kyle & Company built: coastal tankers and Type B ship deck barges. Kyle & Company was opened as a manufacturer of steel products and build ships for the war. After World War II, the shipyard closed in 1950 and was purchased by Pittsburgh-Des Moines Steel Co. Kyle & Company also made steel products in Fresno and Sacramento. The shipyard was located on the Stockton Channel at 348 North Harrison Street, now a parking lot near Banner Stadium and Stockton Arena. The Kyle & Company shipyard was on the deepwater port on the Stockton Ship Channel of the Pacific Ocean and an inland port located more than seventy nautical miles from the ocean, on the Stockton Channel and San Joaquin River-Stockton Deepwater Shipping Channel (before it joins the Sacramento River to empty into Suisun Bay).

== Coastal tanker ==
Kyle and Company coastal tankers had a displacement of 484 tons, length of 162 feet, beam of 27 feet, a draft of 13 feet, top speed of 9 kts, and crew of 23, including gun crew of 6. The tanker had two single 20mm AA guns and fuel cargo capacity of 280,000 gal. It was powered by one 6-cyl diesel engine, with a single screw and had 400 shp.

== Deck barge ==
Kyle and Company built deck barges that had a length of 110 feet, a beam of 35 feet, a draft of 6 feet, light displacement of 170 tons, full displacement of 500 tons, and deadweight of 330 tons.

== Ships ==
Original name or #	Original owner	Type	Delivered	Notes	Tons	Feet	Hull #	Ship ID# O.N.
BC 522	US Army	Deck barge	9/42-12/42			110		
BC 523	US Army	Deck barge	9/42-12/42			110		
BC 524	US Army	Deck barge	9/42-12/42			110		
BC 525	US Army	Deck barge	9/42-12/42			110		
BC 526	US Army	Deck barge	9/42-12/42			110		
BC 527	US Army	Deck barge	9/42-12/42			110		
BC 528	US Army	Deck barge	9/42-12/42			110		
BC 529	US Army	Deck barge	9/42-12/42			110		
BC 530	US Army	Deck barge	9/42-12/42	Sold as GC 21		110		253379
BC 531	US Army	Deck barge	9/42-12/42			110		
BC 532	US Army	Deck barge	9/42-12/42			110		
BC 533	US Army	Deck barge	9/42-12/42			110		
BC 534	US Army	Deck barge	9/42-12/42			110		
BC 535	US Army	Deck barge	9/42-12/42			110		
BG 1182	US Army	Gasoline barge	Apr-43			120		
BG 1183	US Army	Gasoline barge	Apr-43	Sold as P. S. No. 76		120		250925
BG 1184	US Army	Gasoline barge	Apr-43	Sold as ST 20		120		269612
BG 1185	US Army	Gasoline barge	Apr-43	Sold as Manson 45		120		269689
BG 1186	US Army	Gasoline barge	Apr-43			120		
BG 1187	US Army	Gasoline barge	Apr-43			120		
BG 1188	US Army	Gasoline barge	Apr-43			120		
BG 1189	US Army	Gasoline barge	Apr-43			120		
Y 28	US Army	Coastal tanker	1/44-6/44		484	162		
Y 29	US Army	Coastal tanker	1/44-6/44	Sold 1946 as J. J. Kelly	484	162		255610
Y 30	US Army	Coastal tanker	1/44-6/44	Sold 1946 as Argo	484	162		
Y 31	US Army	Coastal tanker	1/44-6/44	To Norway 1946 as Liten	484	162		
Y 32	US Army	Coastal tanker	1/44-6/44	To Honduras 1946 as Ana	484	162		
Y 33	US Army	Coastal tanker	1/44-6/44	To Norway 1946 as Angelus	484	162		
Y 34	US Army	Coastal tanker	1/44-6/44	To Honduras 1946 as Tania	484	162		
Y 35	US Army	Coastal tanker	1/44-6/44	To the Philippines 1946 as Y 35	484	162		
Y 44	US Army	Coastal tanker	7/44-9/44		484	162		
Y 45	US Army	Coastal tanker	7/44-9/44	To the Philippines 1946 as Y 45	484	162		
Y 46	US Army	Coastal tanker	7/44-9/44	To USAF 1946 as C-50-1171	484	162		
YC 1419	US Navy	Open lighter	1952	Active	170	110		
YFN 1163	US Navy	Closed lighter	1952	Active	160	110		
YFN 1191	US Navy	Closed lighter	1952	Scrapped 1996	140	110		
YFNX 30	US Navy	Closed lighter	1952	Sold 2007 as Discovery (Panama)	140	110		
YO 231	US Navy	Tank barge						

== See also ==
- California during World War II
- Maritime history of California
- Moore Equipment Company in Stockton
- Hickinbotham Brothers Shipbuilders in Stockton
- Wooden boats of World War 2
- Cryer & Sons
