= USS Silica =

Barge of the United States Navy

History

United States
- Name: USS Silica
- Builder: Barrett & Hilp, Belair Shipyard, San Francisco, California
- Laid down: 5 December 1943
- Launched: 31 December 1943
- Commissioned: 8 June 1944
- Decommissioned: 30 November 1945
- Stricken: 3 January 1946
- Fate: Wrecked by a typhoon, 9 October 1945, scuttled in deep water on unknown date

General characteristics
- Class & type: Trefoil-class cargo barge
- Displacement: 5,636 long tons (5,726 t)
- Length: 366 ft 4 in (111.66 m)
- Beam: 54 ft (16 m)
- Draft: 26 ft (7.9 m)
- Propulsion: None
- Speed: Not self-propelled
- Complement: 52 officers and men
- Armament: 1 × 40 mm AA gun

USS Silica (IX-151), a Trefoil-class concrete barge designated an unclassified miscellaneous vessel, was the only ship of the United States Navy to be named for silica. Her keel was laid down as SS Bauxite (T. B7-D1, MC hull 1331) on 5 December 1943 by Barrett & Hilp, Belair Shipyard, San Francisco, California. She was launched on 31 December 1943 sponsored by Mrs. William O'Neill, and renamed Silica. Acquired by the Navy and commissioned on 8 June 1944 under command of Lt. Ormond A. Seavey USNR. Later she was under command of Lt. J. B. Neal USNR.

== Service history ==
=== World War II, 1944–45 ===
Silica was acquired for use as a store ship to be used to provide general supplies at advance bases. She was assigned to Service Squadron 8, Service Force, Pacific Fleet. On 30 June, Gulf Star took her in tow at San Francisco and departed for Pearl Harbor, arriving on 13 July. Three days later, the barge was towed to Eniwetok. Megrez (AK-126) towed her from there to Ulithi where she remained from 16 October 1944 to 7 May 1945. Serrano (ATF-112) towed her to the Philippine Islands where she remained until August when she was towed to Okinawa.

=== Wrecked by a typhoon ===
Silica was driven aground in Buckner Bay on 9 October 1945 by Typhoon Louise. A Board of Inquiry found her damaged beyond economical repair and recommended that she be destroyed or sunk in deep water. Silica was decommissioned on 30 November 1945 and struck from the Naval Vessel Register on 3 January 1946. Refloated and sunk in deep water at unknown date.
