= USS Carmita (IX-152) =

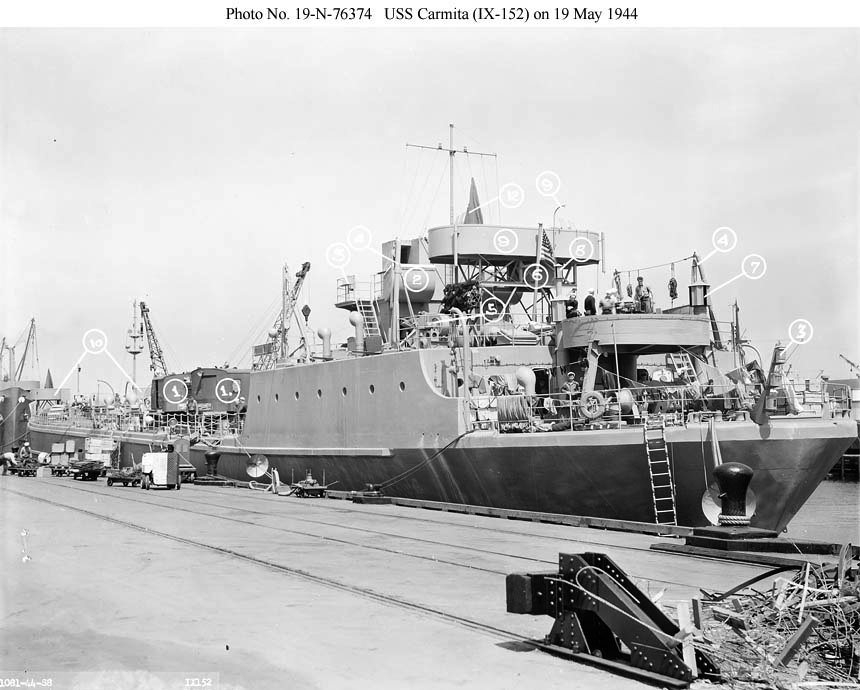
- Carmita (IX-152) at San Francisco, 19 May 1944

History

United States
- Name: USS Carmita
- Builder: Barrett, Hilp & Belair Shipyard, San Francisco
- Laid down: 1943
- Launched: 11 November 1943
- Commissioned: 11 May 1944
- Out of service: 25 September 1946
- Stricken: 25 September 1946
- Fate: Sunk, 1947

General characteristics
- Class & type: Trefoil-class cargo barge
- Displacement: 5,687 long tons (5,778 t) light; 10,960 long tons (11,136 t) full
- Length: 366 ft 4 in (111.66 m)
- Beam: 54 ft (16 m)
- Draft: 26 ft (7.9 m)
- Propulsion: None
- Complement: 52
- Armament: 1 × 40 mm AA gun

USS Carmita (IX-152) was a Trefoil-class concrete barge - a supply ship made of concrete - during World War II. Considered an unclassified miscellaneous vessel, she was acquired and placed in service on 11 May 1944 under command of Lt. C. E. Burch USNR. The IX-152 was the second ship of the United States Navy to have the name Carmita and was named for the first Carmita, a schooner captured during the American Civil War. The IX-152 was launched as "Silica", She was then renamed "Slate" before being renamed "Carmita" (IX-152). She was attached to Service Force, Pacific Fleet, until 25 September 1946 when she was stricken from the Naval Vessel Register. Commander, Naval Forces, Philippines was authorized by Chief of Naval Operations on 5 March 1947 to destroy or abandon IX-152. She was reported as sunk by the Ship Repair Facility, Manicani, near Samar, Philippines 27 March, 1947, location unknown.
