= USS Chimariko =

Tugboat of the United States Navy

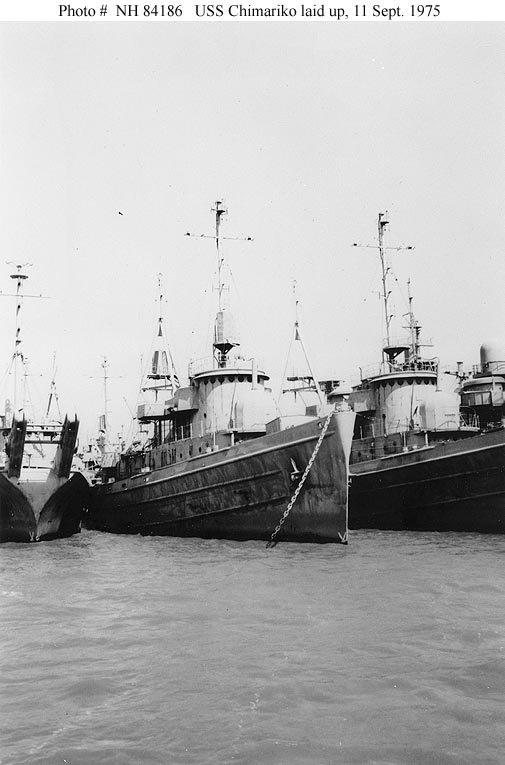
- USS Chimariko

History

United States
- Name: USS Chimariko
- Namesake: A Native American tribe living in California
- Ordered: 1944
- Builder: Charleston Shipbuilding & Dry Dock Co., Charleston S.C.
- Laid down: 1944
- Launched: 30 December 1944
- Commissioned: 28 April 1945
- Decommissioned: 30 October 1946 at San Pedro, CA
- Fate: Sunk as a target off southern California, 27 August 1978

General characteristics
- Class & type: Abnaki-class Tug
- Displacement: 1,190 tons
- Length: 205 ft (62 m) (overall)
- Beam: 38.4 ft (11.7 m) (extreme)
- Draft: 15.3 ft (4.7 m) (mean)
- Propulsion: Diesel/electric, four General Motors 12-278A diesel main engines driving four General Electric generators and three General Motors 3-268A auxiliary services engines, single screw
- Speed: 16.5 kn (19.0 mph; 30.6 km/h)
- Complement: 85 officers and men
- Armament: As Built: 1 × single 3 in (76 mm) caliber gun; 2 × twin 40 mm guns; 2 × single 20 mm guns

USS Chimariko (ATF-154) was an Abnaki class Fleet Ocean Tug of the United States Navy and the first to be named Chimariko after the Native American tribe in California.

She was laid down as (AT-154) at Charleston Shipbuilding and Dry Dock Co., Charleston S.C.

On 15 May 1944 she was redesignated Fleet Ocean Tug (ATF-149). She was launched on 30 December 1944 (Sponsored by Mrs. G. Davis) and commissioned USS Chimariko (ATF-154) on 28 April 1945. Departing Norfolk, Va.

== World War II ==
- 5 June 1945; Chimariko reached Galveston, Texas
- 12 to 16 June; Towed the disabled tanker SS C. A. Canfield from Sabine Pass
- 16 June to 1 July; She towed a floating drydock YFD-3 to Cristobal, C.Z.
- 9 July; Passing through the Panama Canal she towed YFs 727 and 1069 via San Diego to Kwajalein, in the Marshall Islands arriving 25 August
- 1 September; She departed for San Pedro Bay, Leyte, P.I., arriving 19 September

== Post war ==
- 17 October 1945; The Chimariko reported at Okinawa for salvage duty
- 14 January 1946; She towed the concrete barge Lignite to Hong Kong, weathering a severe storm in the straits south of Formosa to arrive safely 19 January.
- 18 February 1946; Chimariko departed Hong Kong and, after brief periods of salvage and towing duty at Subic Bay, P.I. and Guam, she steamed via Pearl Harbor to San Pedro, Calif., arriving 9 June to be placed out of commission and placed in the Pacific Reserve Fleet 31 October 1946.

== Final Disposition ==
Chimariko was transferred to Maritime Administration custody in 1962, but was returned to the Navy in August 1976 for use as a salvage training hulk. Later employed as a target, she was sunk in deep water off Southern California on 27 August 1978.

She now lies at rest in 1150 fathoms at 032,00 N, 118,00 W.
