= USS Dorsey =

Wickes-class destroyer

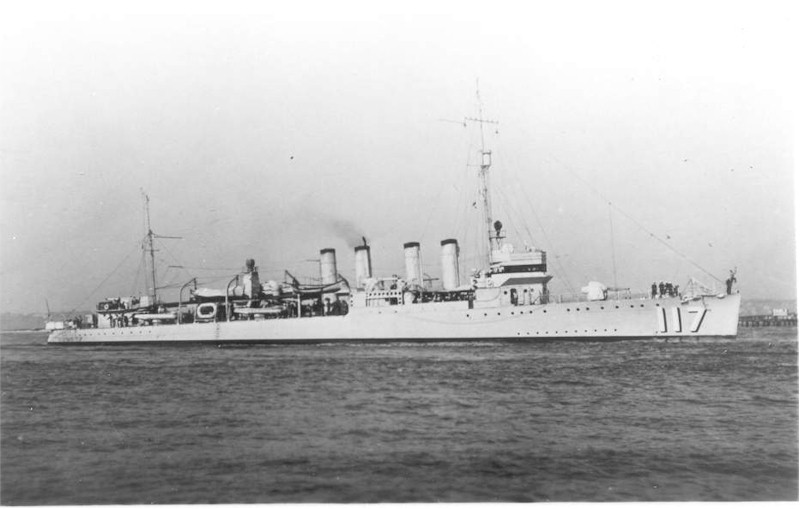
- USS Dorsey underway

History

United States
- Name: Dorsey
- Namesake: John Dorsey
- Builder: William Cramp & Sons, Philadelphia
- Yard number: 454
- Laid down: 18 September 1917
- Launched: 9 April 1918
- Commissioned: 16 September 1918
- Decommissioned: 9 March 1923
- Identification: DD-117
- Recommissioned: 1 March 1930
- Decommissioned: 8 December 1945
- Reclassified: DMS-1, 19 November 1940
- Fate: Hull destroyed, 1 January 1946

General characteristics
- Class & type: Wickes-class destroyer
- Displacement: 1,090 tons
- Length: 314 ft 5 in (95.8 m)
- Beam: 31 ft 8 in (9.7 m)
- Draft: 8 ft 8 in (2.6 m)
- Speed: 35 knots (65 km/h)
- Complement: 100 officers and enlisted
- Armament: 4 × 4 in (102 mm)/50 guns; 2 × 3 in (76 mm)/23 guns; 12 × 21 in (533 mm) torpedo tubes

USS Dorsey (DD–117), reclassified DMS-1 on 19 November 1940, was a Wickes-class destroyer in the United States Navy during World War I. She was named for John Dorsey.

Dorsey was launched on 9 April 1918 by William Cramp & Sons, Philadelphia, sponsored by Mrs. A. Means, distant relative of Midshipman Dorsey. The destroyer was commissioned on 16 September 1918.

== Service history ==
Dorsey sailed with a merchant convoy from Philadelphia on 20 September 1918, escorted it to Ireland, and returned to New York on 19 October. Between 28 October and 20 November, she voyaged on escort duty to the Azores, then operated locally out of New York until 13 January 1919 when she got underway for target practice and fleet maneuvers in Cuban waters, returning 2 March. Three days later she sailed to escort George Washington with President Woodrow Wilson embarked as far as the Azores, returning to Guantánamo Bay 21 March to join the fleet for maneuvers.

Dorsey sailed from Guantánamo Bay, Cuba on 9 April 1919, and arrived at Valletta, Malta on 26 April to report to Commander, Adriatic Squadron, for duty in the execution of the terms of the armistice with Austria. She served in the Mediterranean Sea until 9 July when she proceeded to New York arriving on 21 July.

Dorsey sailed from New York with her division on 17 September 1919 for the west coast, arriving at San Diego on 12 October. She joined in fleet maneuvers in the Panama Canal Zone and operated with seaplanes at Valparaíso, Chile, until clearing San Diego on 25 June 1921 to join the Asiatic Fleet.

Dorsey arrived at Cavite, Philippine Islands on 24 August 1921, and served in experimental submarine practice and long-range battle and torpedo practice. On 3 June 1922, she sailed from Manila to call at Shanghai and Chefoo, China, Nagasaki, Japan, and Pearl Harbor on her passage to San Francisco where she arrived on 2 October. She was placed out of commission at San Diego on 9 March 1923.

Recommissioned on 1 March 1930, Dorsey operated on the west coast, in the Canal Zone, and in the Hawaiian Islands acting as plane guard for aircraft carriers and participating in tactical maneuvers with the fleet. In reserve from 10 to 29 June 1935, she then entered Mare Island Navy Yard for the installation of gear for her new assignment as a high-speed towing vessel.

Dorsey continued to operate from San Diego providing high-speed target towing for ships in training along the west coast, in the Canal Zone, and, between 29 December 1938 and 25 April 1939, in the Caribbean Sea. From 3 July 1940 she was based at Pearl Harbor. She entered Pearl Harbor Navy Yard on 6 November for conversion to a high-speed minesweeper and was reclassified DMS-1 on 19 November 1940.

=== World War II ===
When the Japanese attacked Pearl Harbor on 7 December 1941, Dorsey was at sea with TF 3 bound for Johnston Island. The force returned to its base on 9 December, and Dorsey was assigned to the Hawaiian Sea Frontier for patrol, local escort, and training duty. Except for overhaul at San Francisco from 1 January to 11 February 1943, she remained on this duty until 24 September 1943.

After scouting convoys to Efate, New Hebrides, and Noumea, New Caledonia, Dorsey sailed to the Solomon Islands for patrol and minesweeping operations. She swept and patrolled off Cape Torokina, Bougainville, and screened transports during the landings of 1 November, returning on 8 November and 13 November with reinforcement and supply convoys. She escorted from her base at Port Purvis on Florida Island to Noumea until 29 March 1944, then screened transports between Port Purvis, Kwajalein, Manus, and New Georgia until arriving at Majuro on 12 May for duty towing targets at high speed for ships in training. From 20 June to 9 July she guarded convoys between Kwajalein and Eniwetok, then escorted the escort carrier Makin Island to Pearl Harbor, and proceeded to San Francisco for overhaul.

Returning to Pearl Harbor on 1 October 1944, Dorsey had towing duty and joined in minesweeping experiments until 9 November when she got underway as convoy escort for Port Purvis. On 1 December, she arrived at Manus for minesweeping operations until 23 December. Continuing to San Pedro Bay, Leyte, Dorsey sortied on 2 January 1945 for the invasion of Lingayen Gulf. During the pre-invasion minesweeping she accounted for several attacking planes and rescued five survivors from stricken LCI(G)-70.

Dorsey arrived off Iwo Jima for pre-invasion minesweeping on 16 February 1945. She patrolled during the assault landings, and towed Gamble to safety on 18 February. She sailed from Iwo Jima on 1 March for Ulithi to prepare for the invasion of Okinawa, where she arrived 25 March to sweep mines. On 27 March she was struck a glancing blow by a Mitsubishi Ki-51 kamikaze which killed three of her crew and wounded two. Dorsey remained on duty, screening assault shipping during the landings of 1 April and patrolling until 4 April when she departed for Pearl Harbor and battle damage repairs.

Returning to Okinawa 1 July 1945, Dorsey joined the minesweeping unit operating in conjunction with the 3rd Fleet raids on the Japanese home islands. She sailed on 14 September for minesweeping operations in the Van Diemen Straits, returning to Okinawa five days later. On 9 October, she was grounded by Typhoon Louise. Decommissioned on 8 December 1945, her battered hulk was destroyed on 1 January 1946.

== Awards and memorabilia ==
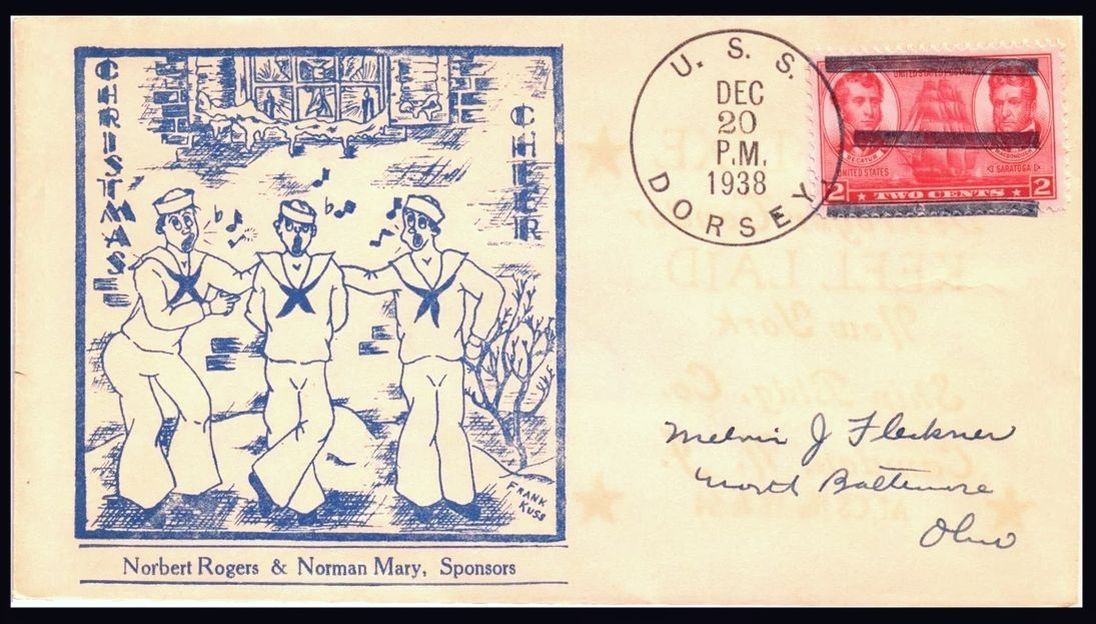
USS Dorsey cover with 1938 naval postmark

Dorsey received six battle stars for World War II service.

As of 2004, no other ships in the United States Navy have gone by this name.

== John Dorsey ==
John Dorsey (about 1783 - 7 August 1804) was an officer in the United States Navy during the First Barbary War. Born in Maryland, Dorsey was appointed midshipman on 28 April 1801. He was killed on 7 August 1804 in the attack on Tripoli in North Africa when Gunboat No. 9 was blown up by an enemy shell. In his honour, USS Dorsey was named after him.

== See also ==
- Typhoon Louise (1945)
