= Type B ship =

Type of World War II barge

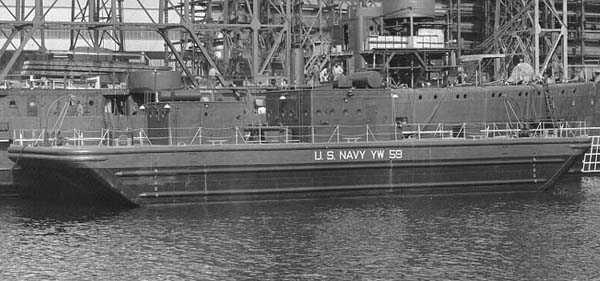
US Navy Water Barge, YW-59, launched August 29, 1941, in Norfolk Naval Shipyard, later stationed in Naval Base Trinidad

The Type B ship is a United States Maritime Administration (MARAD) designation for World War II barges. Barges are very low cost to build, operate, and move, and can transport bulky cargo. Because barges lack engines for self-propulsion, they are usually moved by a tugboat, some classed as Type V ships. Once the barge is moved into position, the tugboat departs and can do another task. This means there is no immediate rush to load or unload the barge.

Toward the end of World War II, some ships that had not been completed in time for the war were converted into barges. US Navy water barges are given the hull classification symbols YWN or YW. Some barge classification symbols contain -N, indicating that the barge was not self-propelled. Due to the shortage of steel during World War II, concrete ship constructors were given contracts to build ferrocement barges for oil or gasoline, which were given the hull symbols YO, YOG, and YOGN; built in 1944 and 1945, some were named after chemical elements.

== List ==
Type		Notes
YF	Freight (Lighter) Barge	Self-propelled
YFN	Freight Barge	Non-self-propelled
YFR	Refrigerated Freight Barge	Self-propelled
YFRN	Refrigerated Freight Barge	Non-self-propelled
YR	Floating Workshop	
YRB	Repair and Berthing Barge	
YRBM	Yard Repair Berthing and Messing	YRBM-18 (formerly APL-55) received the Presidential Unit Citation for service during the Vietnam War (6 December 1968 – 31 March 1969).
YRDH	Dry-Dock Workshops, Hull	
YRDM	Dry-Dock Workshops, Machinery	
YRR	Radiological Repair Barge	Used to support nuclear plant overhauls of nuclear ships and submarines, also refueling and decontamination of used equipment.
YCV	Aircraft Barge	Built to transport aircraft; built by Alameda Works Shipyard and Pearl Harbor NSY at 480 tons.
LBE	Landing Barge, Emergency repair	Used in WW2 to repair landing craft.
LBK	Landing Barge, Kitchen	
LBV	Landing Barge, Vehicle	
LBO, YO, YON	Landing Barge, Oiler	
LBW, YW	Landing Barge, Water	
LBF	Landing Barge, Flak	
YFNB	Large Covered Lighter	Non-self-propelled barge, e.g. YR 47 and YRR 9. See No Name YFNB-47, a 152' long, 36' beam barge used for repairs.
YFNX	Special Purpose Barges	Non-self-propelled and used at shore. Most were a modified YC or YFN hull. The modified barge gave the craft a specialized use, such as a laboratory, sonar research, or stowage for submarine goods.
YFND	Dry Dock Companion Craft	Non-self-propelled barges. YFND were a special purpose barge used to support the auxiliary floating drydocks, which had little crew support space.
YFP	Floating Power Barges	Non-self-propelled barges with fuel and a generator to make a mobile power station, and were able to produce up to 20,000 kilowatts of power.
YOG	Gasoline Barge	Self-propelled, with tanks for gasoline that had a capacity of 8,200 Bbls.
YOGN	Gasoline Barge	Non-self-propelled
YG	Garbage Barge, also called Lighter	Self-propelled with one direct-drive Atlas diesel engine to a single propeller, 240 shp.
YGN	Garbage Barge	Non-self-propelled
YPD	Floating Pile Drivers	Non-self-propelled barges used to build piers.
YSR	Sludge Removal Barge	Non-self-propelled barge 110 foot long with a 34-foot beam. Built for cleaning fuel oil or other tanks that have sludge and/or foreign matter.

== Types ==
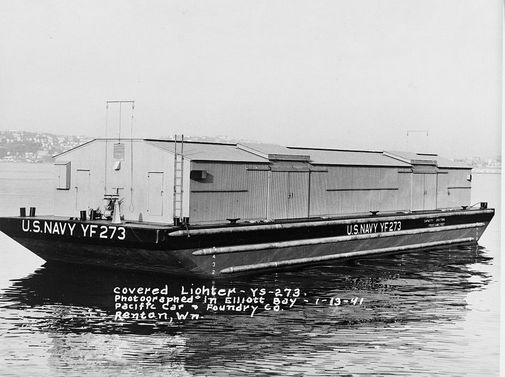
FY-273 covered lighter barge

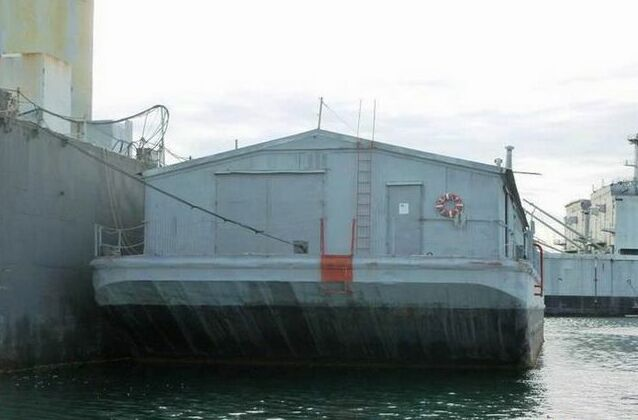
YFN-958 a covered lighter barge, non-self-propelled, built by Mare Island Navy Shipyard in 1944. Light Displacement 188 tons. Full Displacement 688 tons.

=== Freight (Lighter) Barges (YF – YFN) ===
YF barges were self-propelled. YFN barges were not self-propelled. YFN worked near shore in harbors, rivers, and other protected waters, and could carry a load of 550 long tons. They had steel hulls, were 110 feet long, had a 32-foot beam and maximum draft of 8 feet. The Pacific Bridge Company built 27 YFN freight barges in 1943 (YFN-576 – YFN-603). Pollock-Stockton Shipbuilding Company built FN-619 to FN-742 and YFN-998 to YFN-1016.

=== Refrigerated Freight Barges (YFR – YFRN) ===
YFR Barges were self-propelled. YFRN barges were not self-propelled. Olson & Winge of Seattle made 10 (YFRN-833 – YFRN-841) in 1943 for the war. The Defoe Shipbuilding Company of Bay City, Michigan, built three (YFR-888, YFR-889, and YFR-890) in 1945. Long Beach Naval Shipyard of Long Beach, California, built the YFRN-997 in 1945. A few barges were converted to refrigerated barges, also called reefer barges.

=== Repair Barges ===
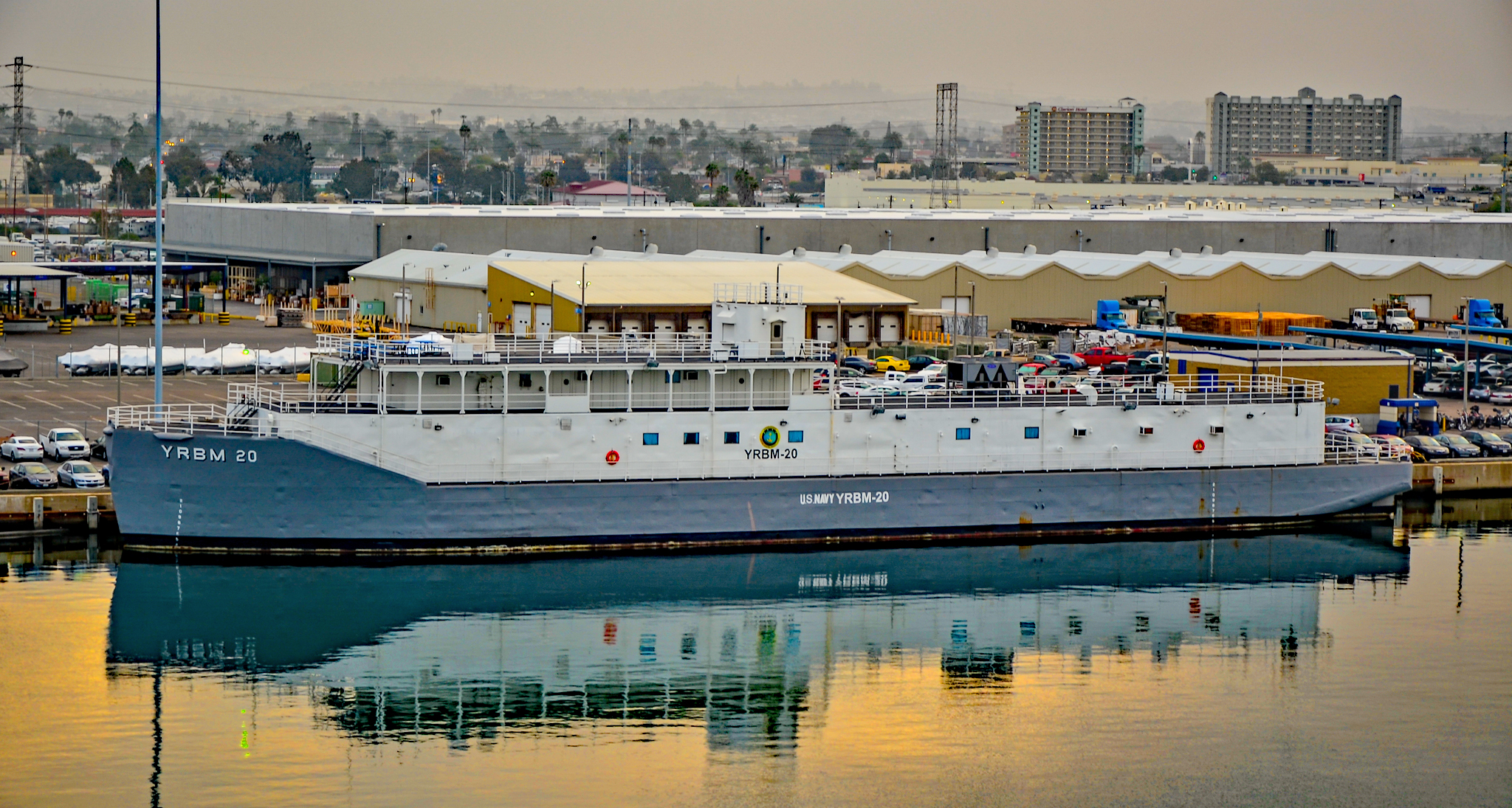
Yard Repair Berthing and Messing, YRBM-20 at San Diego Naval Base (built in 1945)

Yard Repair Berthing and Messing (barracks ships) are repair barges type TR, YR, YRB, YRBM, YRDH, YRDM, YRR, LBE built in 1944 for World War II. Repair Barges were self-sustaining, 530 tons and 153 feet long. They had a beam of 36 feet and a draft of 6 feet. Repair barges had a machine shop and living quarters. They repaired small boats and craft. The barge had generators, a distilling plant, an air compressor, and a steam boiler. The living space had berths and a mess hall to support a crew of 48 men.

Type		Number built	Notes
YR	Floating Workshop	96 built, 24 built before WW2	
YRB	Repair and Berthing Barge	36 built	
YRBM	Yard Repair Berthing and Messing	56 built	YRBM-18 (formerly APL-55) received the Presidential Unit Citation for service during the Vietnam War (6 December 1968 – 31 March 1969).
YRDH	Dry-Dock Workshops, Hull	8 built	
YRDM	Dry-Dock Workshops, Machinery	8 built	
YRR	Radiological Repair Barge	14 built	Used to support nuclear plant overhauls of nuclear ships and submarines, also refueling and decontamination of used equipment.
LBE	Landing Barge, Emergency repair		Used in WW2 to repair landing craft.

=== Barracks Barge ===
The US Navy Barracks Barges, also called berthing barges, were each 1,300 tons and 261 feet long. They were used as a temporary barracks for sailors or other military personnel. A barracks ship also saw use as a receiving unit for sailors who needed temporary residence prior to being assigned to their ship. Barracks Barges are a type of auxiliary ship, called an APL (auxiliary personal living).

- APL-1 to APL-58 are non-self-propelled barracks ships built in 1944 and 1945. APL displaced 2,600 tons at full load. Dimensions are 261.2 feet long, 49.2 feet beam, draft 8.5 feet when fully loaded. WW2 armament was four 20 mm guns. Crew quarters could accommodate 71 officers and 583 men. Some are still in use, such as the USS Mercer (APL-39).
- APL-59 to APL-72 are post-WW2 barracks ships.

=== Landing Barge, Kitchen ===
Landing Barge, Kitchen (LBK) was a landing craft used to support amphibious landings in northwestern Europe during and after the Normandy invasion of World War II. Its primary purpose was to provide hot meals to the crews of the many minor landing craft not fitted with galley facilities. Constructed of steel, this shallow-draft lighter had storage and serving space to feed 900 men for one week. The kitchen capacity was able to provide 1,600 hot meals and 800 cold meals a day. They were used by both the US and British on D-Day.

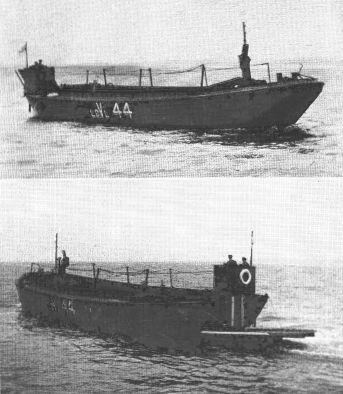
Landing Barge, Vehicle (LBV): ramp up and down

=== Landing Barge, Vehicle ===
Landing Barge, Vehicle (LBV 1, mark 1) was a barge with a ramp added to load and unload vehicles like jeeps and trucks during World War 2. A nine-foot, four-inch ramp was added to the stern for loading and unloading. LBV 2, Mark 2, had an engine that could propel the LBV at 4.5 knots. They were powered by two Chrysler RM gas engines and were used by both the US and British on D-Day. Built in three sizes: small (70 feet long), medium (78 feet long), and large (82 feet long). Each had a draft of about 4 feet when loaded.

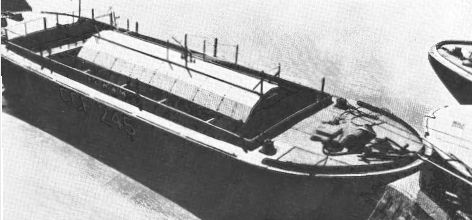
Landing Barge, Oiler (LBO) and Landing Barge, Water (LBW)

=== Landing Barge, Oiler ===
Landing Barge, Oiler (LBO; also YO and YON) stored fuel oil or diesel fuel for landing craft. They had a 40-ton fuel tank, with two compartments and an engine that could propel them at 4.5 knots. They were used by both the US and British on D-Day.

=== Landing Barge, Water ===
Landing Barge, Water (LBW or YW) were barges with a 33-ton freshwater tank and an engine that could propel them at 4.5 knots. They were World War 2 landing support vessels. Used by both the US and British on D-Day. YWN are non-self propelled.

=== Landing Barge, Flak ===
Landing Barge, Flak (LBF) were landing barges with a 40mm anti-aircraft gun, manned by a crew of five. They also had two 20-mm Hispano AA guns or two twin Lewis guns. The LBF were 60 to 90 feet long. They could transport 15 troops. Used by both the US and British on D-Day.

=== Deck Barge ===
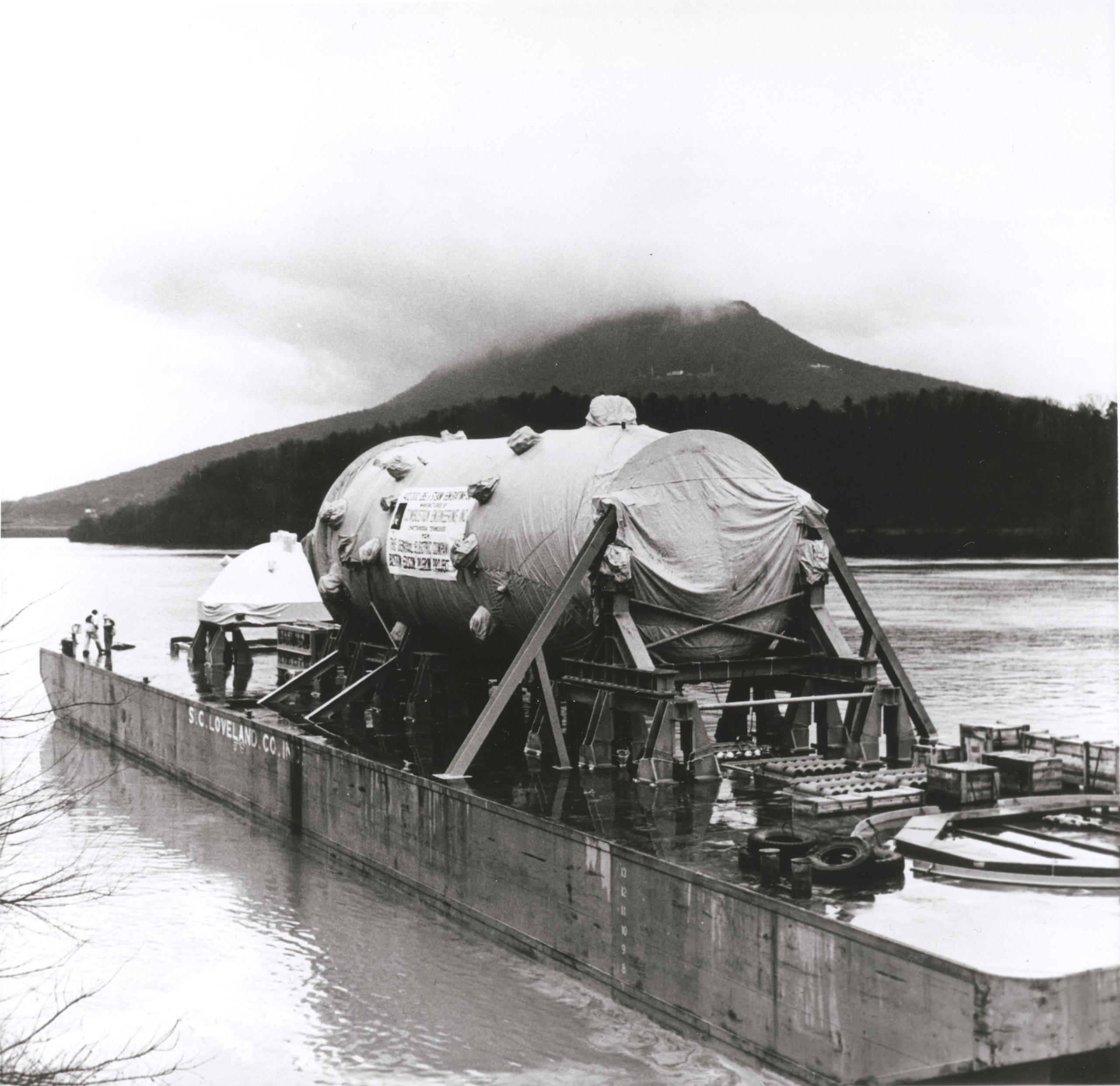
World War 2 type deck barge

Deck Barges offered a large flat platform, on which many types of gear could be moved. The only downside was the cargo had a slightly higher center of gravity. A number of shipyards built deck barges. Kyle and Company of Stockton, California, built US Army BC-522 to BC-535 deck barges in 1942, that had a length of 110 feet, a beam of 35 feet, a draft of 6 feet, light displacement of 170 tons, full displacement of 500 tons, and deadweight of 330 tons.

=== Concrete Barge ===
Concrete Barges were built by Concrete Ship Constructors in National City, California, in 1944 and 1945. These were a type of concrete ship built with ferrocement. Steel shortages led the US military to order the construction of small fleets of ocean-going concrete barge and ships. Typical displacement: 5,636 long tons (5,726 t), full load: 12,910 tons; length: 366 ft 4 in (111.66 m), beam: 54 ft (16 m), draft: 26 ft (7.9 m); crew: 52 officers and men. Ship armament one to four 40 mm AA gun.

Concrete ships were fitted as needed. Some had diesel-electric power generators for refrigeration or tool use, or equipment for water distilling. Others were used to store fuel or water (up to 60,000 barrels), while others served as the Quartermaster general store.

Type MC B7-A2 were concrete tank barges (5,786 deadweight tons) made by Concrete Ship Constructors Inc in National City, CA.

- YOG-85
- YO-144
- YOG-40
- YOG-41
- YOG-42 – Beached off a Hawaiian island, visible from the shore
- YOG-64 – Service history unknown, now wrecked at the Staten Island boat graveyard, currently known as the Donjon Iron and Metal Scrap Facility
- YO-145
- YO-146 – Sank in accident, July 1957
- YOG-53
- YO-159 – Sunk by Japanese submarine RO-42 off New Hebrides, 14 January 1944
- YO-160 – Atomic bomb test at Bikini Atoll, 25 July 1946
- YO-161 – Sank at Eniwetok, 29 November 1946
- YO-162
- YO-163
- YO-182
- YO-183
- YOGN-82 – Sunk on June 23, 2018, to form an artificial reef in Powell River, B.C.
- YO-184 – Sank at Eniwetok during typhoon in September 1946
- YO-185 – Sank off Saipan, 16 March 1946
- YOG-83 – Sank off Kwajalein, 16 September 1948
- YO-186 – Sank at sea off Guam, 5 April 1948
- YO-187 – Lost by grounding off Midway Island in 1957
- YOG-84 – Lost during typhoon at sea off Saipan, 14 November 1948

Type B5-BJ1 were covered dry cargo barges mostly operated by the Army. They were 265 feet long with a deadweight of 1,632 tons.

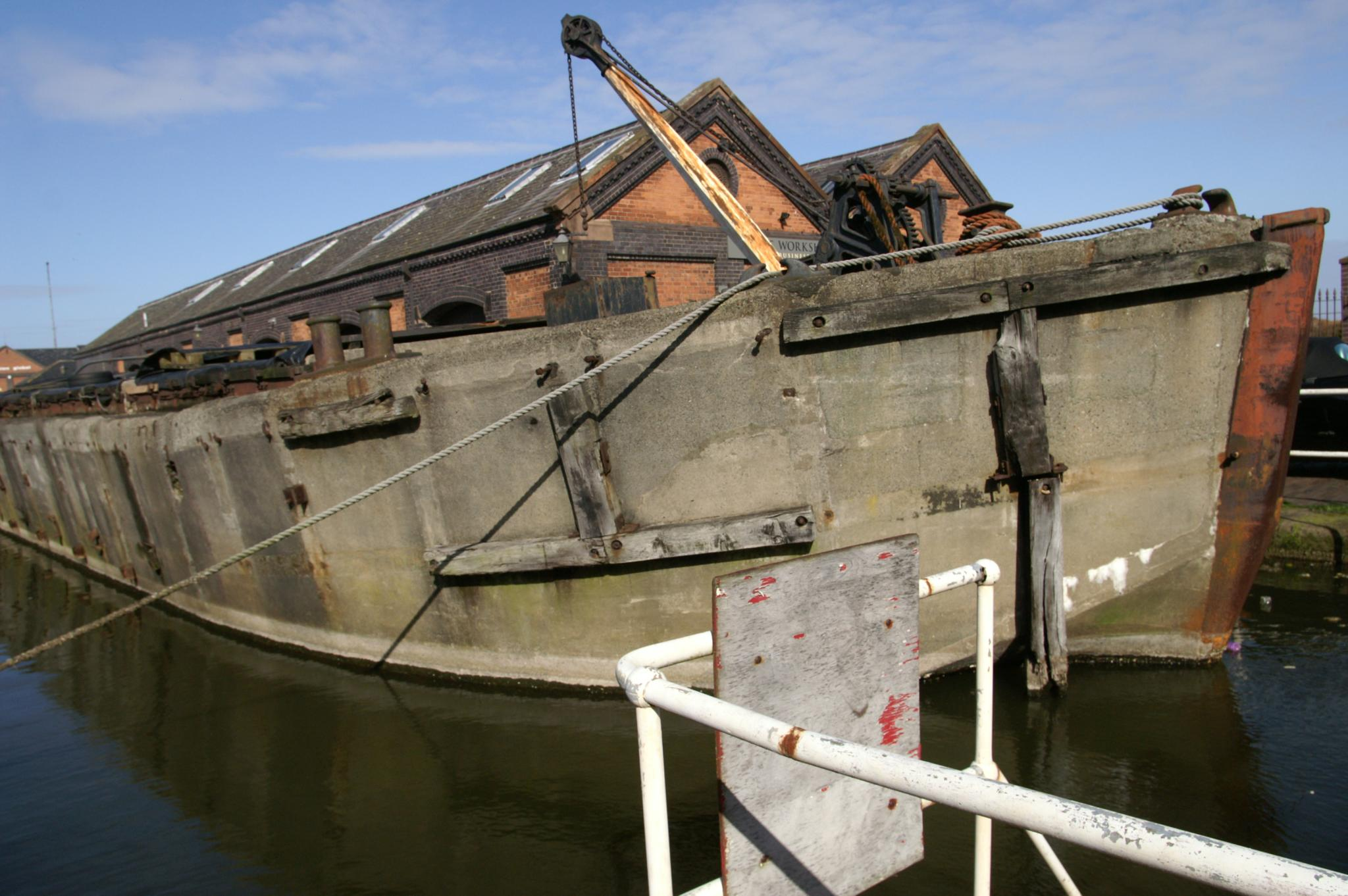
WW2 concrete barge at the National Waterways Museum, Ellesmere Port, Cheshire, UK

- Barium
- Helium
- Nitrogen
- Radium
- Argon
- Cadmium
- Chromium
- Cobalt
- Iridium
- Lithium
- Magnesium
- Neon
- Nickel
- Phosphorus
- Sodium
- Sulphur
- Tellurium
- Tungsten
- Uranium
- Bismuth
- Bromide
- Hydrogen – with reefer storage
- Calcium – with reefer storage
- Antimony – with reefer storage
- Cerium – maintenance barges
- Radon – maintenance barges
- YOGN 104 – built by Alabama Dry Dock Mobile AL Ex-C 105, disposed of 1947

1950s

- Built by Trinity Industries in Nashville, TN (165 feet long, 245 tons)
  - YOGN-110
  - YOGN-111
  - YOGN-112
  - YOGN-113
- Built by Albina Engine & Machine in Portland, OR (165 feet long, 245 tons)
  - YOGN-114
  - YOGN-115 – used to support cooling efforts at the Fukushima Daiichi nuclear power
  - YOGN-116
  - YOGN-117
  - YOGN-118
  - YOGN-119 – renamed YON 367, sunk as target 1973
  - YOGN-120 – renamed Ex-BG 1165, sunk as target 1978
  - YOGN-121
  - YOGN-122 – Ex-BG 8452, scrapped 1986
  - YOGN-123 – Ex-BG 6380, YON 252
  - YOGN-124 – Ex-BG 6383, struck 2006
  - YOGN-125 – Ex-YWN 154, now YON
- Built by Manitowoc SB in Manitowoc, WI (174 feet long, 440 tons)
  - YOGN-196 – renamed Ex-YO 196, sunk as target 2000

Trefoil-class concrete barge – Type: B7-D1 were built by Barrett & Hilp in South San Francisco, California. They had a tonnage of M.C. deadweight: 5,687; full load: 10,970 tons; dimensions: length: 366'4", beam: 54', with max draft 26'.

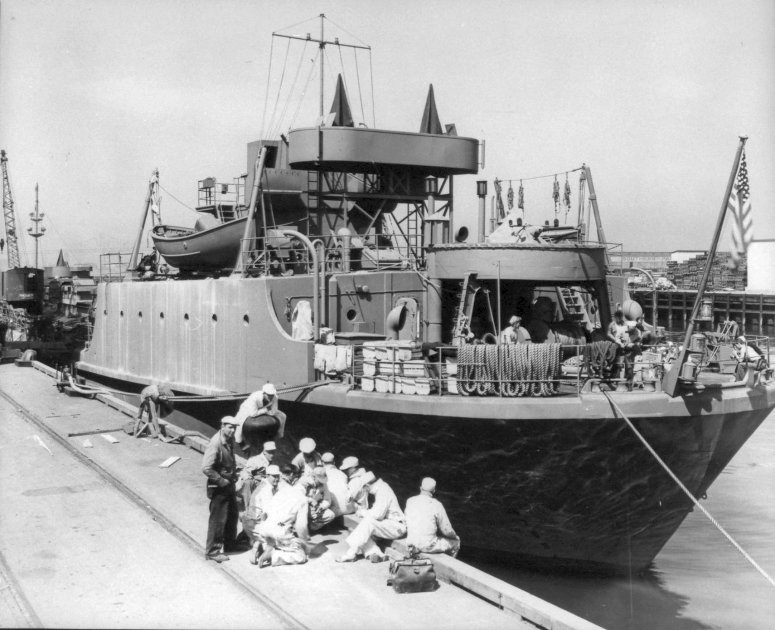
The Trefoil in 1944, when she was known as the Midnight

- Trefoil
- Quartz
- Silica
- Carmita (ex-Slate)
- Asphalt
- Bauxite
- Limestone
- Feldspar
- Marl
- Barite
- Lignite
- Cinnabar
- Corundum

B7-A1 were 5,786 deadweight tons concrete barges.

- MacEvoy Shipbuilding Corporation of Savannah, Georgia, made seven B7-A1 concrete barges in 1944.
- San Jacinto Shipbuilding Corporation of Houston, Texas, made four B7-A1 concrete barges in 1943.

=== Wood Barges ===
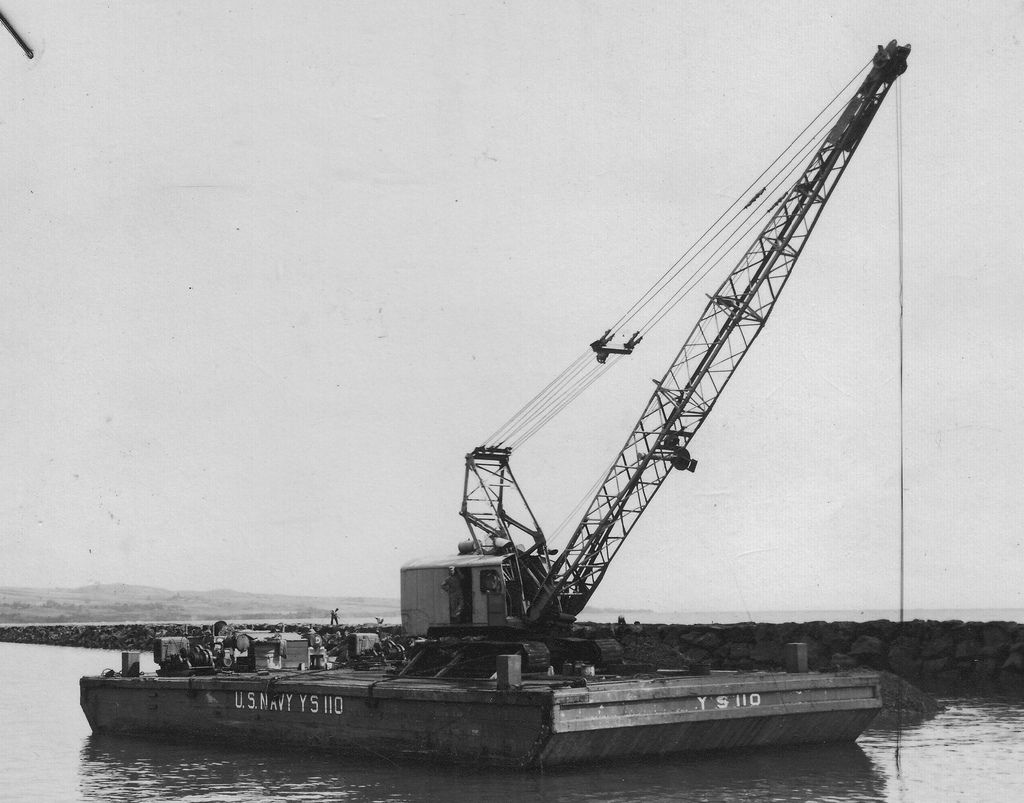
US Navy wooden barge YS-110 with crawler crane in 1942

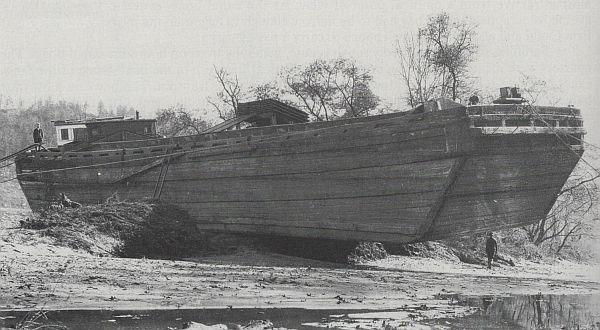
Wood Barge

A number of different types of wood barges were used in the war. A flat bottom wood barge could be used in shallow ports or be towed onto beaches. They had low construction cost and could be abandoned after used if needed. To stop wooden hull rot, many had copper-sheathed hulls. With the shortage of steel, a fleet of wood barges and a fleet of concrete barges were also built.

Barge	Type	Builder	Notes
YS-110		Pearl Harbor Navy Yard, in 1943	Flat deck, 80' long, with a 40' beam
YS-88		Pearl Harbor Navy Yard, in 1941	100' long, with a 42' beam
YC-843 – YC-847		Martha's Vineyard Ship Building Company in Vineyard Haven, MA, in 1942	Built for the US Navy; 110' long, 250 tons
Western Larch I	type #B5-G1	Anacortes Shipways in Anacortes, WA	
Western Larch II	type #B5-G1	Anacortes Shipways in Anacortes, WA	
Western Larch III	type #B5-G1	Anacortes Shipways in Anacortes, WA	

== US Army ==
United States Army barges were given the prefix of "B". For World War II over 6,000 barges were built for the Army, by 130 different shipyards. Often used for assault landings; if there was no harbor, a bulldozer or tank could tow the barge onto the beachhead, so supplies would be available to the troops. Barges were also used for ship-to-ship transfers and quick unloading, and were moved by a tugboat (also called a sea mule).

US Army barge types
Type		Notes
B	Barge	
BC	Deck barge	Medium: 110' – 130'
BW	Water barge	
BD	Derrick crane barge	
BSP	Self-propelled barge	
BG	Gasoline tank barge, or other liquid	
BTL	Truck (Tank) Landing barge	
BCL	Dry Cargo barge, Large	Large: 210' or more
BCS	Dry Cargo barge, Small	Small: 45' – 60'
BB	Balloon barge, for Barrage balloons	
BBP	Balloon Barrage Leader	Self-propelled
BCLF	Causeway barge	Lighter pier into water
BPL	Pier Lighter	
BK	Knockdown barge	Deck barge modules that can be connected together
BKC	Knockdown, Deck barge	Medium: 110' – 130'
BKR	Knockdown, Refrigeration barge	
BKO	Knockdown, Tank barge	
BKSC	Knockdown, Nesting barge	
FMS	Repair Shop barge	
JMLS	Joint Modular Lighter System	
BDL	Beach Discharge Lighter	
BCDK	Enclosed barge, Knockdown	

== World War I barge types ==
Many World War I barges were used in World War II, due to the high demand.

=== Steel ===
- Built by American Steel Barge Company in Superior, WI, from 1891 to 1945.
  - Water Barge self-propelled
    - YW, YW-1 to YW-132
  - Water Barge non-self-propelled
    - YWN-145 (was YW-145)
    - YWN-146 (was YW-146)
    - YWN-147
    - YWN-148 ex YON-187
    - YW-149
    - YW-150
    - YW-151
    - YW-152
    - YWN-153
    - YWN-154
    - YW-155
    - *YWN-156 ex YOGN-116
    - YWN-157 ex YOG-32

The following table (incomplete) lists steel-hulled barges built by the U.S. after its entry into World War One. They were built for the Emergency Fleet Corporation (EFC) of the United States Shipping Board (USSB) and are listed with their EFC design numbers and the hull numbers assigned to them by the EFC.

Barge name	EFC Hull #	Type	Builder	Build year	Notes
Darien	301	Design 1039, Coal Barge	Alabama Drydock and Shipbuilding Company in Mobile, AL	1920	Renamed Debardeleben Marine III in 1960, renamed Texas Gulf Sulphur 8 in 1962
Mamei	302	Design 1039, Coal Barge	Alabama Drydock and Shipbuilding Company in Mobile, AL	1920	Renamed Patricia Sheridan in 1960
Nashville	2776	Design 1096, Tank Barge	Nashville Bridge Company in Nashville, TN	1920	
Hermitage	2777	Design 1096, Tank Barge	Nashville Bridge Company in Nashville, TN	1920	
Old Hickory	2778	Design 1096, Tank Barge	Nashville Bridge Company in Nashville, TN	1920	
Caney Fork	2779	Design 1096, Tank Barge	Nashville Bridge Company in Nashville, TN	1920	

=== Wood ===
The following table (incomplete) lists wooden-hulled barges built by the U.S. after its entry into World War One. Except for the barges YC 600-602, all were built for the Emergency Fleet Corporation (EFC) of the United States Shipping Board (USSB) and are listed with their EFC design numbers and the hull numbers assigned to them by the EFC. Some were based on the EFC Design 1001 ship, originally a steamship design.

Barge name	EFC Hull #	Type	Builder	Build year	Notes
Millville	2432	Design 1067	American Lumber in Millville, FL	1919	
Barden	46	Design 1001	Anacortes Shipways in Anacortes, WA	1918	
Allenhurst	2038	Design 1115	Allen Shipbuilding in Seattle, WA	1919	
Ahmik	2188	Design 1115	Allen Shipbuilding in Seattle, WA	1919	
Shelbank	2127	Design 1109	Beaumont Shipbuilding & Dry Dock Company in Beaumont, TX	1920	Later completed as sailing ship Marie F. Cummins; scrapped in 1947.
Shelby	2128	Design 1109	Beaumont Shipbuilding & Dry Dock Company in Beaumont, TX	1920	Later completed as sailing ship Albert D. Cummins; now rests in mud in the Delaware River.
Sherwood	2141	Design 1067	Coastwise Shipbuilding in Baltimore, MD	1919	
Catonsville	2142	Design 1067	Coastwise Shipbuilding in Baltimore, MD	1919	
Carroll	2143	Design 1067	Coastwise Shipbuilding in Baltimore, MD	1920	
Whitehead	2481	Design 1067	Cobb, F. & Company, in Rockland, ME	1919	
Druid Hill	2594	Design 1067	Crook, H. E. in Baltimore, MD	1919	
Ruxton	2595	Design 1067	Crook, H. E. in Baltimore, MD	1920	
Hallowell	2577	Design 1067	Crosby Navigation in Richmond, VA	1919	
Richmond	2578	Design 1129	Crosby Navigation in Richmond, VA	1919	
YC 600		115-ton Coal Barge	Gildersleeve Shipbuilding in Gildersleeve, CT	1918	
YC 601		115-ton Coal Barge	Gildersleeve Shipbuilding in Gildersleeve, CT	1918	
YC 602		115-ton Coal Barge	Gildersleeve Shipbuilding in Gildersleeve, CT	1918	
Tompkinsville	2305	Design 1067	Johnson Shipyards in Mariners Harbor, NY	1919	
Wellesley	2323	Design 1067	Machias Shipbuilding in Machias, ME	1919	
Jonesport	2324	Design 1067	Machias Shipbuilding in Machias, ME	1919	
Cabria	2311	Design 1001	McEachern Shipbuilding in Astoria, OR	1920	
Chalcis	2687	Design 1001	Meacham & Babcock in Seattle, WA	1919	
Charnis	2688	Design 1001	Meacham & Babcock in Seattle, WA	1919	
Matagorda	2109	Design 1067	Midland Bridge in Houston, TX	1919	
Aransas	2110	Design 1067	Midland Bridge in Houston, TX	1919	
Cabacan	49	Design 1001	Sloan Shipyards in Anacortes, WA	1918	
Dacula	50	Design 1001	Sloan Shipyards in Anacortes, WA	1918	
Anastasia	2101	Design 1067	St. Johns River Shipyard Co. in Jacksonville, FL	1919	
Ormond	2102	Design 1067	St. Johns River Shipyard Co. in Jacksonville, FL	1919	
Daytona	2103	Design 1067	St. Johns River Shipyard Co. in Jacksonville, FL	1919	
Dione	2224	Design 1001	Tacoma Shipbuilding in Tacoma, WA	1918	
Iberia	2005	Design 1067	Union Bridge & Construction Company in Morgan City, LA	1919	
Vermilion	2006	Design 1067	Union Bridge & Construction Company in Morgan City, LA	1919	
Ramos	2007	Design 1067	Union Bridge & Construction Company in Morgan City, LA	1919	
Endymion	2315	Design 1001	Wright Shipyards in Tacoma, WA	1918	

=== Concrete ===
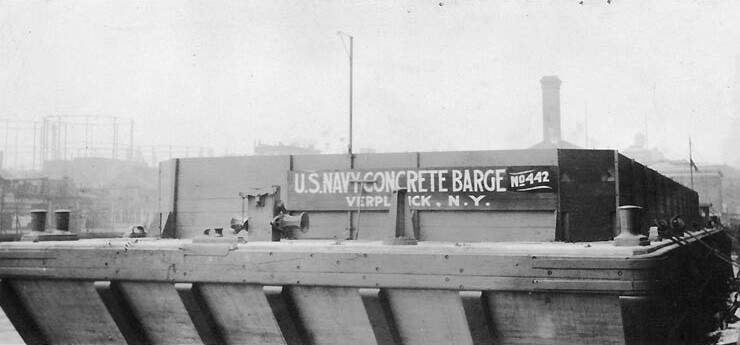
US Navy YC-442, Barge #442, built 1918

Louis L. Brown built concrete barges at Verplank, New York.

- YC-516 – Barge #1 (Coal Barge #516), built 1918
- YC-442 – Barge #442, built 1918, displacement 922 tons
- For WW1, 12 emergency fleet concrete barges were ordered for the war, but were not completed in time and so were sold to private companies.

(12 Concrete ships were also built, like the SS Atlantus.)

== Notable incidents ==
- YOG 42, gasoline barge – Under tow by Navajo (AT64) when Navajo was torpedoed and sunk by Japanese submarine I-39 on 12 September 1943, 150 miles east of Espiritu Santo. Recovered by USS Sioux (AT-75).
- YO-64 – Sank due to enemy action in the Philippines in January 1942.
- YO 41 and YO 42 fuel oil barges – Sank 22 February 1942 during enemy action in the Philippines.
- YSP-44, YSP-46, YSP-47, YSP-48, YSP-49 – Salvage barges and the YSR-2, a sludge barge, sank 22 February 1942 during enemy action in the Philippines.
- YW-54 water barge – destroyed in early 1942 in enemy action in the Philippines.
- YW-50, YW-55, and YW-58 water barges – captured 10 December 1941 with the surrender of American forces on Guam.
- YC-891 – Sank on 18 April 1945, while under tow by the tug Mauvila (YT-328) off Key West, Florida.
- USS YOG-76 – Sank on 13 November 1969 in Cua Viet Cove, South Vietnam after two underwater explosions hit her. Refloated and taken to Da Nang, South Vietnam. Not repaired due to severe damage.
- Syncline YO-63 – A Bullwheel Class fuel oil barge, Self-propelled, sank in 1972 north of Tahiti.
- YW-114 – A YW-83 Class self-propelled water barge. Sank when cargo shifted at Tongass Narrows near Ketchikan, Alaska on 12 August 1989.
- YF-1079 – Ran aground and damaged at Buckner Bay, Okinawa, after Typhoon Louise in October 1945. YF-757 also sank in the storm.
- YON-184 – Sank at Eniwetok in a typhoon in September 1946.
- Winifred Sheridan – A sea-going coal barge. Sank with the Mary E. O'Hara a sailing fishing ship after they collided on 20 January 1941, in blinding snowstorm off The Graves Light.
- Chickamauga – While under tow by the steamer Samuel Mitchell in fog, she collided with the Mitchell at Houghton Point, Lake Superior, on 18 May 1908.
- Dunaj 2 – Sank after striking a mine in the Sea of Azov on 29 September 1943.
- YC21 – Sank in a storm on 15 November 1968.
- Allegheny – Shelled and sunk in the Atlantic Ocean 9.5 nautical miles (17.6 km) east-southeast of the Metopkin Inlet, Virginia (37°34′N 75°25′W) by U-boat U-754 on 31 March 1942. All three crewmembers were rescued by USCGC CG-4345 (United States Coast Guard).
- YCK-8 – Wooden barge sank 2.7 miles off Key West, Florida on 12 December 1943. She was under tow by Army tug LT-4.
- USS YO-159 – A self-propelled fuel oil barge. Torpedoed and damaged 250 nautical miles (460 km) east of Espiritu Santo (15°27′S 171°28′E) by Ro-42 on 14 January 1944. Two torpedoes hit YO-159's concrete hull, causing the loss of her fuel oil cargo which caught fire. She was scuttled the following day by USS PC-1138.
- USS Asphalt (IX-153) – An S-class Trefoil concrete barge was wrecked at Saipan, Northern Mariana Islands, in a storm on 6 October 1944.
- USS YO-156 and USS YO-157 – World War II self-propelled fuel oil barges. Lost at Sitka, Alaska, in May 1945.
- USS Silica – An S-class Trefoil concrete barge. Ran aground on 9 October 1945 during a Typhoon Louise off Okinawa.
- YON-160 – Sank in Operation Crossroads. The fuel oil barge was sunk as a target by an atomic bomb at Bikini Atoll on 25 July 1946.
- USS Lignite (IX-162) – Wrecked by a typhoon, 9 October 1945.
- YC-442 – Barge sank 11 September 1923.

== United Kingdom ==
Thames Lighters, or dumb barges, were non-self-propelled barges. The original Thames barges were sailing vessels that were converted for the war. Some LB (Landing Barge) vessels had ramps added and were called LBR (Landing Barge, Ramped). Some had engines and rudder added and were referred to as LBV (Landing Barge Vehicle). They were used for different tasks: Landing Barge Oiler (LBO), Water (LBW), Kitchen (LBK), and Emergency Repair (LBE), Landing Barge Flak (LBF) and Gun (LBG). There was also one Landing Barge Cable (LBC). Many brought supplies to Normandy.

== Current barge classes ==
- Type B I barge hull – Designed to ensure no uncontrolled release of cargo to the water or atmosphere.
- Type B II barge hull – Designed to carry products which require substantial preventive measures to ensure no uncontrolled release of cargo to the water or atmosphere, but only if the release does not constitute a long-term hazard.
- Type B III barge hull – Designed to transport products classed as minor hazards, thus needing less degree of control.

== See also ==
- Barracks ship, barge
- Rhino ferry
- Ramped cargo lighter
- Marinefährprahm
- Operation Sea Lion
- United States Merchant Marine Academy
- List of auxiliaries of the United States Navy
- List of yard and district craft of the United States Navy

Other MARAD designs

- Liberty ship (Type EC2-S-C1 ship)
- Type C1 ship
- Type C2 ship
- Type C3 ship
- Type V ship
- Victory ships (Type VC2-S-AP1 ship)
