= USS SC-636 =

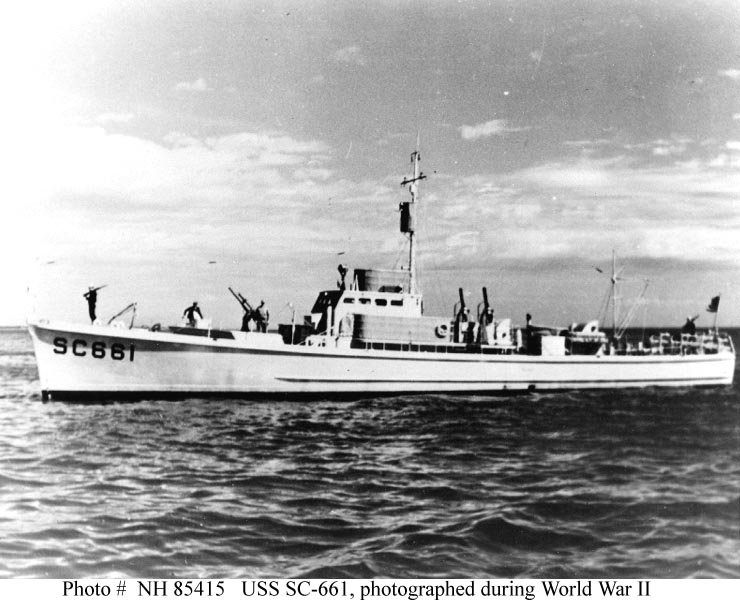
- USS SC-661, a fellow SC-497 class submarine chaser.

History

United States
- Laid down: 29 August 1941
- Launched: 14 May 1942
- Commissioned: 11 July 1942
- Fate: Foundered off the coast of Okinawa on 9 October 1945.

General characteristics
- Displacement: 148 tons
- Length: 110 ft 10 in (34 m)
- Beam: 17 ft (5 m)
- Draft: 6 ft 6 in (2 m)
- Propulsion: 2 × 880bhp General Motors 8-268A diesel engines; 1 × Snow and Knobstedt single reduction gear; 2 × shafts
- Speed: 15.6 knots
- Complement: 28
- Armament: 1 × 40 mm gun mount; 2 × .50 cal (12.7 mm) machine guns; 2 × DCP Y guns; 2 × DCT

USS SC-636 was a SC-497 class submarine chaser that served in the United States Navy during World War II.

It was laid down on 29 August 1941 by the Vineyard Shipbuilding Co. in Milford, Delaware and launched on 14 May 1942. It was commissioned on 11 July 1942. It foundered during Typhoon Louise on 9 October 1945 off the coast of Okinawa.
