= USS Lignite =

History

United States
- Name: USS Lignite
- Builder: Barrett & Hilp, Belair Shipyard, San Francisco, California
- Laid down: 8 December 1943
- Launched: 26 February 1944
- In service: 26 September 1944
- Out of service: 6 August 1946
- Stricken: 28 August 1946
- Honors and awards: 1 battle star (World War II)
- Fate: designated a Constructive Total Loss on 25 October 1949.

General characteristics
- Class & type: Trefoil-class cargo barge
- Displacement: 5,281 long tons (5,366 t)
- Length: 366 ft 4 in (111.66 m)
- Beam: 54 ft (16 m)
- Draft: 26 ft (7.9 m)
- Propulsion: None
- Speed: Not self-propelled
- Complement: 114 officers and men
- Armament: 1 × 40 mm AA gun; 4 × 20 mm AA guns

USS Lignite (IX-162), a Trefoil-class concrete barge designated an unclassified miscellaneous vessel, was the only ship of the United States Navy to be named for lignite. Her keel was laid down on 8 December 1943 by Barrett & Hilp, Belair Shipyard, San Francisco, California, under a Maritime Commission contract (T. B7-D1-Barge). She was launched on 26 February 1944 sponsored by Miss Catherine Barrett, converted for use as a United States Army and United States Marine Corps stores barge by Barrett & Hilp, acquired by the Navy on 26 September 1944, and placed in service at San Francisco the same day under command of Lt. F. E. Lucifer USNR.

== Service history ==
Assigned to Service Force, Pacific Fleet, Lignite served as a general stores and issue barge at advance bases in the Philippines and Okinawa. She continued this duty throughout the remainder of World War II.

While serving at Okinawa after the war, the barge was grounded at Buckner Bay on 9 October 1945 by Typhoon Louise, one of the most violent storms ever to strike Okinawa. Lignite, was refloated on 16 October, towed to Hong Kong in March 1946, and towed to Subic Bay, Luzon, in May. She was placed out of service at Subic Bay on 6 August 1946. Her name was struck from the Naval Register on 28 August 1946. She was declined by the War Shipping Administration on 7 October 1946.

On 4 February 1947, she was transferred to the U.S. Army War Department. Sometime in 1947 she broke away from her tow vessel during a typhoon and ended up on the fringing reef off Eil Malk, Palau. The cargo was seemingly salvaged by Walt Simmons in a 59-day operation that started in September 1947. as ‘Grounded and Badly Damaged’ in December 1947 but also that she was ‘On loan to Army’ as of 1 January 1948. She was designated a Constructive Total Loss on 25 October 1949.

== Awards ==
Lignite received one battle star for World War II service.
