= USNS Shearwater =

History

United States
- Name: USNS Shearwater
- Namesake: Shearwater, a long winged seabird
- Builder: Hickinbotham Brothers Shipbuilders at Stockton, California
- Laid down: October 1944, as U.S. Army FS-411 for the U.S. Army
- Completed: in April 1945
- Commissioned: 25 October 1944 as U.S. Army FS-411
- In service: May 1964 as Survey Support Ship, USNS Shearwater (T-AG-177)
- Out of service: February 1969
- Stricken: c. 1969
- Identification: IMO number: 8037487; MMSI number: 367108930; Callsign: WYR4071
- Fate: transferred to the U.S. Army; sunk as an artificial reef in 2015

General characteristics
- Type: Design 381 coastal freighter
- Tonnage: 381 tons
- Displacement: 935 tons full load
- Length: 165 ft (50 m)
- Beam: 32 ft (9.8 m)
- Draft: 14 ft 3 in (4.34 m)
- Propulsion: two 500 hp GM-Cleveland 6-298A diesel engines, twin screws
- Speed: not known
- Complement: 26 personnel

USNS Shearwater (T-AG-177) was a Shearwater-class miscellaneous auxiliary built during the final months of World War II for the US Army as FS-411 (Design 381 coastal freighter) by Hickinbotham Brothers Shipbuilders. FS-411 was Coast Guard manned operating in the Central and Western Pacific, including Hawaii, Saipan, Tinian, Guam, during the closing days of the war.

She was placed into service by the U.S. Navy from 1964 to 1969 as USNS Shearwater (T-AG-177). After this service, she was transferred back to the U.S. Army.

== Operational history as T-AG-177 ==
Shearwater began her naval service as a survey support ship with the Military Sea Transportation Service in May 1964. Operated by a Civil Service crew, she operated in the Atlantic Ocean until mid-February 1969, when she was transferred back to the U.S. Army.

As of 2007, Shearwater was active as a fishing vessel based at Reedville, Virginia. She was retired in 2013 and reefed off the coast of Delaware onto the Del-Jersey-Land Inshore Reef site in 2015.
