= USS Marl =

History

United States
- Name: USS Marl
- Builder: Barrett & Hilp, Belair Shipyard, San Francisco, California
- Laid down: 16 November 1943
- Launched: 2 February 1944
- Sponsored by: Mrs. J. M. Ryan
- In service: 29 August 1944
- Out of service: 2 August 1946
- Stricken: 15 August 1946
- Reinstated: 1 March 1947 transferred on charter to War Department
- Fate: Sold, 3 August 1948

General characteristics
- Class & type: Trefoil-class cargo barge
- Displacement: 5,281 long tons (5,366 t) light
- Length: 366 ft 4 in (111.66 m)
- Beam: 54 ft (16 m)
- Draft: 26 ft (7.9 m)
- Propulsion: None
- Speed: Not self-propelled
- Complement: 114 officers and men
- Armament: 1 × 40 mm AA gun; 4 × 20 mm AA guns

USS Marl (IX-160), a Trefoil-class concrete barge designated an unclassified miscellaneous vessel, was the only ship of the United States Navy to be named for marl. Her keel was laid down under Maritime Commission contract (T. B7.D1) by Barrett & Hilp, Belair Shipyard, South San Francisco, California, on 16 November 1943. She was launched on 2 February 1944 sponsored by Mrs. J. M. Ryan, converted for Navy use as a cargo barge, acquired by the Navy under loan charter from the Maritime Commission on 29 August 1944; and placed in service at San Francisco the same day under command of Lt. E. A. Mooney USNR.

== Service history ==
Assigned to duty with Service Squadron 8, Marl was towed to the Philippines where during the remainder of the war in the Pacific she provided facilities for storing and issuing United States Army and United States Marine Corps supplies at Leyte. On 23 September 1945 she departed San Pedro Bay under tow by Lipan (ATF-85) and headed in convoy bound for Okinawa. A vicious typhoon dispersed the convoy north of the Philippines on 29 September, and mountainous seas parted Marl from her towline early the next day. She was recovered following the storm and towed to Subic Bay on 7 October. She underwent repairs to damaged machinery and continued duty as cargo stores barge until 2 August 1946 when she was placed out of service and delivered to War Shipping Administration. Her name was struck from the Naval Vessel Register on 15 August 1946. On 1 March 1947, at noon, she was transferred on charter to the War Department. Marl was sold by the Maritime Commission to the Asia Development Corporation on 3 August 1948. On 4th September 1948, she was delivered to the new owners at Cavite, Philippines. Future use/disposal unknown.
