= USS Asphalt =

History

United States
- Name: USS Asphalt
- Builder: Barrett & Hilp, Belair Shipyards, San Francisco, California
- Laid down: 1943
- Launched: 29 October 1943
- In service: 30 June 1944
- Stricken: 23 February 1945
- Fate: Wrecked by storm, 6 October 1944, then abandoned
- Notes: Semi-submerged at 15°13′2.60″N 145°42′14.27″E

General characteristics
- Class & type: Trefoil-class cargo barge
- Displacement: 5,636 long tons (5,726 t) light; 10,960 long tons (11,136 t) full
- Length: 366 ft (112 m)
- Beam: 54 ft (16 m)
- Draft: 33 ft (10 m)
- Propulsion: None
- Speed: Not self-propelled
- Complement: 52
- Armament: 1 × 40 mm AA gun

USS Asphalt (IX-153), a Trefoil-class concrete barge designated an unclassified miscellaneous vessel, was the only ship of the United States Navy to be named for asphalt. Her keel was laid down in 1943 at San Francisco, California, by Barrett & Hilp, Belair Shipyards. She was originally to be called ‘Quartz’, and was christened as such by Mrs. Reginald Pecknold. She was acquired by the Navy on 30 June 1944 through the Maritime Commission and was placed in service that same day.

== Service history ==
Assigned to the Service Force, Pacific Fleet, as a floating provisions storage facility, she spent her brief career at forward bases, for the most part at Saipan, as a unit of Service Squadron 10. When a typhoon struck the anchorage at Saipan on 6 October 1944, Asphalt's anchor chains parted, and she was driven hard aground on a coral reef. The barge was then declared a total loss. After her cargo and machinery were salvaged, she was abandoned. Her name was struck from the Naval Vessel Register on 23 February 1945.
