= USS Corundum =

US Naval Ship

History

United States
- Name: USS Corundum
- Builder: Barrett & Hilp, Belair Shipyard, San Francisco
- Laid down: 19 October 1943
- Launched: 31 December 1943
- In service: 18 July 1944
- Out of service: 8 August 1946
- Fate: Returned to the WSA

General characteristics
- Class & type: Trefoil-class cargo barge
- Length: 366 feet 4 inches
- Beam: 54 feet
- Propulsion: None
- Speed: Not self-propelled

USS Corundum (IX-164), a Trefoil-class concrete barge designated an unclassified miscellaneous vessel, was the only ship of the United States Navy to be named for corundum.

The ship (a Type B7-D1 barge) was laid down on 19 October 1943 under a Maritime Commission contract (MC Hull 1332) by Barrett & Hilp, Belair Shipyard, in South San Francisco. She was launched on 31 December 1943, sponsored by Mrs. William O.Neill, and named Limestone (IX-158) on 7 February 1944, but renamed and redesignated Corundum (IX-164) on 23 May 1944, prior to acquisition by the United States Navy, under command of Lt. F. Brinton Jr., USNR.

Corundum was acquired from the Maritime Commission, converted for use as a landing craft and vehicle spare parts barge and assigned to Service Force, Pacific Fleet. She was placed in service on 18 July 1944, towed to the Philippines where she rendered assistance to Commander, Service Division 101. On 8 August 1946 she was placed out of service and delivered to the War Shipping Administration. On 4 February 1947 she was transferred to the U. S. Army. On 28 February 1948 she was scuttled in Agat Bay, Guam.
