= Hickinbotham Brothers Shipbuilders =

Shipyard in Stockton, California, United States

Coordinates: 37.954857°N 121.301583°W

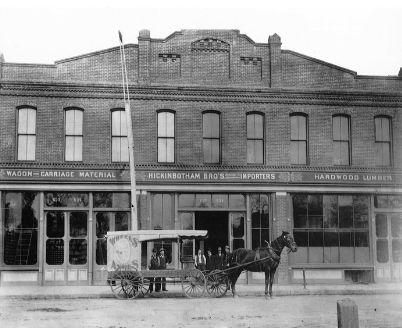
Hickinbotham Brothers in 1894 in Stockton, California

Hickinbotham Brothers Shipbuilders was a shipbuilding company in Stockton, California on the Stockton Channel. To support the World War II demand for ships Hickinbotham Brothers built: Type V ship Tugboats, Tank Landing Barge, balloon barges and Coastal Freighter (design 381, 381 tons). Hickinbotham Brothers also called Hickinbotham Brothers Construction Division was opened in 1852 and is still a working shipyard. Hickinbotham Brothers started by building: horse carriages, horse wagons, threshers and Combine harvester. In 1942 Ronald Guntert and L. R. Zimmerman ran the company as a partnership on the Banner Island waterfront. After World War II, Guntert and Zimmerman purchased Hickinbotham out and renamed the company Guntert & Zimmerman Construction. In 1984 the company moved to Ripon, California on the Stanislaus River, as the business continues. The Banner Island waterfront yard was on the deepwater port on the Stockton Ship Channel of the Pacific Ocean and an inland port located more than seventy nautical miles from the ocean, on the Stockton Channel and San Joaquin River-Stockton Deepwater Shipping Channel (before it joins the Sacramento River to empty into Suisun Bay. Notable ship: USNS Shearwater (T-AG-177).

== Ships ==
Original Name name or #	Original Owner	Type	Delivered	Notes	Feet	Tons	Hull #	Ship ID# O.N.
BTL 455	US Army	Tank Landing Barge	12/42-1/43	Sank on August 2, 1943 off Shemya Island	50			
BTL 456	US Army	Tank Landing Barge	12/42-1/43		50			
BTL 457	US Army	Tank Landing Barge	12/42-1/43		50			
BTL 458	US Army	Tank Landing Barge	12/42-1/43		50			
BTL 459	US Army	Tank Landing Barge	12/42-1/43		50			
BTL 460	US Army	Tank Landing Barge	12/42-1/43		50			
BTL 461	US Army	Tank Landing Barge	12/42-1/43		50			
BTL 462	US Army	Tank Landing Barge	12/42-1/43		50			
BTL 463	US Army	Tank Landing Barge	12/42-1/43		50			
BTL 464	US Army	Tank Landing Barge	12/42-1/43		50			
BTL 465	US Army	Tank Landing Barge	12/42-1/43		50			
BTL 466	US Army	Tank Landing Barge	12/42-1/43		50			
BTL 467	US Army	Tank Landing Barge	12/42-1/43		50			
BTL 468	US Army	Tank Landing Barge	12/42-1/43		50			
BTL 469	US Army	Tank Landing Barge	12/42-1/43		50			
BTL 470	US Army	Tank Landing Barge	12/42-1/43		50			
BTL 471	US Army	Tank Landing Barge	12/42-1/43		50			
BTL 472	US Army	Tank Landing Barge	12/42-1/43		50			
BTL 473	US Army	Tank Landing Barge	12/42-1/43		50			
BTL 474	US Army	Tank Landing Barge	12/42-1/43		50			
BTL 546	US Army	Tank Landing Barge	12/42-1/43		50			
BTL 547	US Army	Tank Landing Barge	12/42-1/43		50			
BD 482	US Army	Derrick Barge	3/43-4/43	Sold as Beaver	110			602235
BD 483	US Army	Derrick Barge	3/43-4/43	Sold as Shelby	110			252566
BD ?	US Army	Derrick Barge	6/43-9/43	Sold as Hercules, now D. B. Portland	110			561614
BD 799	US Army	Derrick Barge	6/43-9/43		110			
BD 800	US Army	Derrick Barge	6/43-9/43		110			
BD 801	US Army	Derrick Barge	6/43-9/43		110			
BD 802	US Army	Derrick Barge	6/43-9/43		110			
ST 146	US Army	Small Tug	6/43-10/43		74			
ST ?	US Army	Small Tug	6/43-10/43	Sold as Mary Ann Brusco	74			247288
ST 147	US Army	Small Tug	6/43-10/43		74			
ST 148	US Army	Small Tug	6/43-10/43		74			
ST 149	US Army	Small Tug	6/43-10/43	To Portugal 1953 as Monte Grande	74			
BSP 1621	US Army	SP Balloon Barge	Sep-43		52			
BSP 1622	US Army	SP Balloon Barge	Sep-43		52			
BB 1623	US Army	Balloon Barge	9/43-10/43		52			
BB 1624	US Army	Balloon Barge	9/43-10/43		52			
BB 1625	US Army	Balloon Barge	9/43-10/43	Sold as Cavale	52			571056
BB 1626	US Army	Balloon Barge	9/43-10/43		52			
BB 1627	US Army	Balloon Barge	9/43-10/43		52			
BB 1628	US Army	Balloon Barge	9/43-10/43		52			
BB 1629	US Army	Balloon Barge	9/43-10/43		52			
BB 1630	US Army	Balloon Barge	9/43-10/43		52			
BB 1631	US Army	Balloon Barge	9/43-10/43		52			
BB 1632	US Army	Balloon Barge	9/43-10/43		52			
BB 1633	US Army	Balloon Barge	9/43-10/43		75			
BB 1634	US Army	Balloon Barge	9/43-10/43		75			
BB 1635	US Army	Balloon Barge	9/43-10/43		75			
BB 1636	US Army	Balloon Barge	9/43-10/43		75			
BB 1637	US Army	Balloon Barge	9/43-10/43		75			
BB 1638	US Army	Balloon Barge	9/43-10/43		75			
BB 1639	US Army	Balloon Barge	9/43-10/43		75			
BB 1640	US Army	Balloon Barge	9/43-10/43		75			
BB 1641	US Army	Balloon Barge	9/43-10/43		75			
BB 1642	US Army	Balloon Barge	9/43-10/43		75			
	US Army	Tender	1944		62			
	US Army	Tender	1944		62			
FS 404	US Army	Coastal Freighter	10/44-4/45	USCG to the Philippines as Venus	176	560		
FS 405	US Army	Coastal Freighter	10/44-4/45	USCG, to the Philippines as Vizcaya	176	560		
FS 406	US Army	Coastal Freighter	10/44-4/45	USCG, lost in typhoon off Okinawa in 1945	176	560		
FS 407	US Army	Coastal Freighter	10/44-4/45	USCG, to USN AKL 31 in 1950, to DoI 1975 as Robert de Brum	176	560		
FS 408	US Army	Coastal Freighter	10/44-4/45	USCG	176	560		
FS 409	US Army	Coastal Freighter	10/44-4/45	USCG	176	560		
FS 410	US Army	Coastal Freighter	10/44-4/45	USCG, sank in typhoon off Okinawa in 1945	176	560		
FS 411	US Army	Coastal Freighter	10/44-4/45	USCG, to USN 1950 as USNS Shearwater (T-AG-177), wrecked on reef in 2015, Beam 32', Draft 14' 3, Speed 12 kts., crew 26, two 500 hp GE Diesel engines	176	560		
White Star		Fishing Vessel	1946	Now Ciudad de Mexico, Frist Guntert & Zimmerman		441		
Ferry No. 14	San Joaquin Co.	Ferry	1946		50	36		538925
Victorias	Victorias Milling	Tug	1947			111		
BD 6646	US Army	Derrick Barge	1954	To USN as YD 218, sold 1967	140	1,000		
BD 6652	US Army	Derrick Barge	1954	To USN as YD 222, reclassified as IX 536 2002	140	1,000		
Otter	Trucano Const.	Tug	1961		64	50		287019

== See also ==
- California during World War II
- Maritime history of California
- Moore Equipment Company in Stockton
- Wooden boats of World War 2
- Cryer & Sons
