= USS Feldspar =

History

United States
- Name: USS Feldspar
- Laid down: 1943
- Launched: 22 January 1944
- Completed: 11 August 1944
- In service: 11 August 1944
- Stricken: 28 August 1946
- Fate: Sold

General characteristics
- Class & type: Trefoil-class cargo barge
- Displacement: 5,636 long tons (5,726 t) light; 10,960 long tons (11,136 t) full
- Length: 366 ft 4 in (111.66 m)
- Beam: 54 ft (16 m)
- Draft: 26 ft (7.9 m)
- Propulsion: None
- Speed: Not self-propelled
- Complement: 52
- Armament: 1 × 40 mm AA gun

USS Feldspar (IX-159), a Trefoil-class concrete barge designated an unclassified miscellaneous vessel, was the only ship of the United States Navy to be named for feldspar.

She was acquired by the Navy and placed in service on 11 August 1944 under command of Lt. F. Harris USNR. She was towed to Pearl Harbor to Eniwetok and thence to Ulithi and then to the Philippine Islands where she provided United States Army and United States Marine Corps supplies. After the war ended she went to Okinawa. During the trip on 30 September, 1945 she was caught in Typhoon Jean, her towline snapped and she suffered great rolling, losing two L.C.V.P.s over board that were deck cargo, in 130-165 MPH winds. Her tow was reestablished three days later. She arrived off Buckner Bay just in time for Typhoon Louise to arrive driving her on shore. She was refloated and left for Subic Bay, Luzon on 25 January, 1946. She was transferred to the Reserve Fleet on 5 August 1946, and struck from the Navy List on 28 August. She was declined by the War Shipping Administration on LV-135, dated 22nd October 1946, and put up for sale. On 16th March 1948, she was sold to Asia Development Corporation of Shanghai at Subic Bay, and was delivered to them on 23rd April 1948. On 17th February 1951 she arrived at Whampoa, towed by ‘Caroline Moller’. Future history unknown, possibly sold to Communist China.
