= Nakagusuku Bay =

- Buckner Bay
- 中城湾
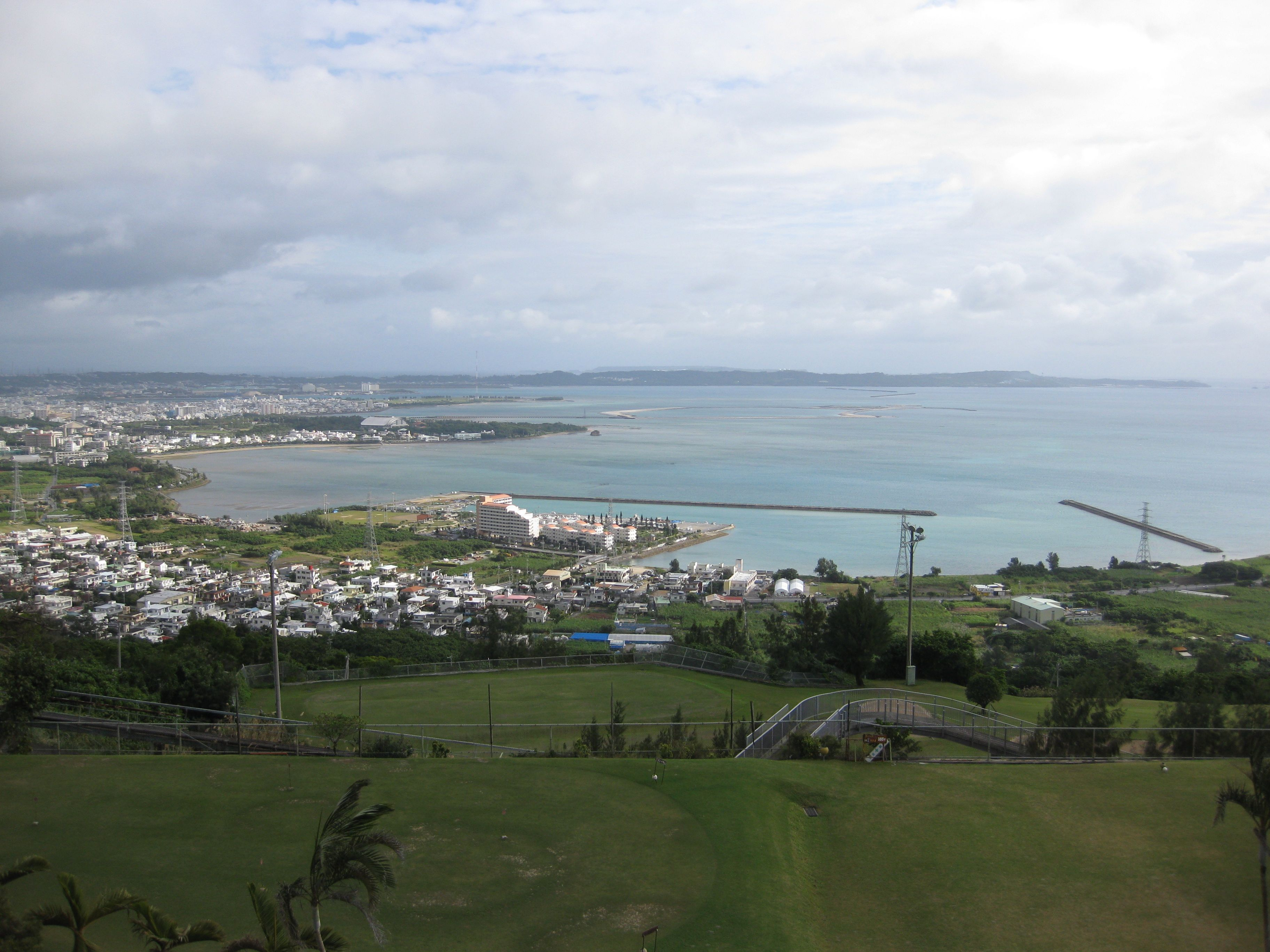
- Nakagusuku Bay

- Location within Okinawa Prefecture
- Location: Pacific Ocean
- Coordinates: 26°15′18″N 127°49′55″E
- Type: Bay
- Max. length: 20 km (12 mi)
- Max. width: 14 km (8.7 mi)
- Surface area: 220 km^{2} (85 sq mi)
- Average depth: 15 m (49 ft)
- Islands: Kudaka Island, Tsuken Island
- Settlements: Uruma, Kitanakagusuku, Nakagusuku, Nishihara, Yonabaru, Nanjō

Nakagusuku Bay (中城湾, Nakagusuku-wan; Okinawan: Nakagushiku-widu) is a bay on the southern coast of Okinawa Island on the Pacific Ocean in Japan. The bay covers 220 square kilometres (85 sq mi) and ranges between 10 metres (33 ft) to 15 metres (49 ft) deep. The bay is surrounded by the municipalities of Uruma, Kitanakagusuku, Nakagusuku, Nishihara, Yonabaru, Nanjō, all in Okinawa Prefecture. In 1852, while visiting the Ryukyu Kingdom, Commodore Matthew Perry mapped Okinawa and labeled Nakagusuku Bay as "Perry's Bay". During the final months of World War II, the bay became a United States Navy forward base and was nicknamed "Buckner Bay".

== History ==
=== Buckner Bay ===
In June 1945, American forces secured Okinawa. Nakagusuku Bay became an important U.S. anchorage. United States Army troops referred to it as "Buckner Bay", in memory of Lieutenant General Simon Bolivar Buckner Jr., commander of U.S. land forces in the campaign, who was killed on 18 June.

Naval Base Buckner Bay was built by Naval Construction Battalion 4 on the bay. It consisted of the anchorage, repair and depot ships, plus onshore support facilities for the US fleet operating off Japan. It also served as a supply and logistics center for forces on Okinawa. It was attacked several times during the closing weeks of the war. The USS Pennsylvania was torpedoed there by a Japanese aircraft. The base continued operations into the immediate postwar period.

In October 1945, Typhoon Louise struck Buckner Bay, inflicting heavy damage. Fifteen merchant ships were driven ashore, some damaged beyond recovery. Three USN destroyers were also wrecked. Over 200 other U.S. military vessels, including six LCTs, various special-purpose boats, patrol boats, and landing craft were grounded, severely damaged, or destroyed altogether. Eighty percent of the buildings in the bay were completely wiped out, while over 60 aircraft then present at local airstrips were damaged.

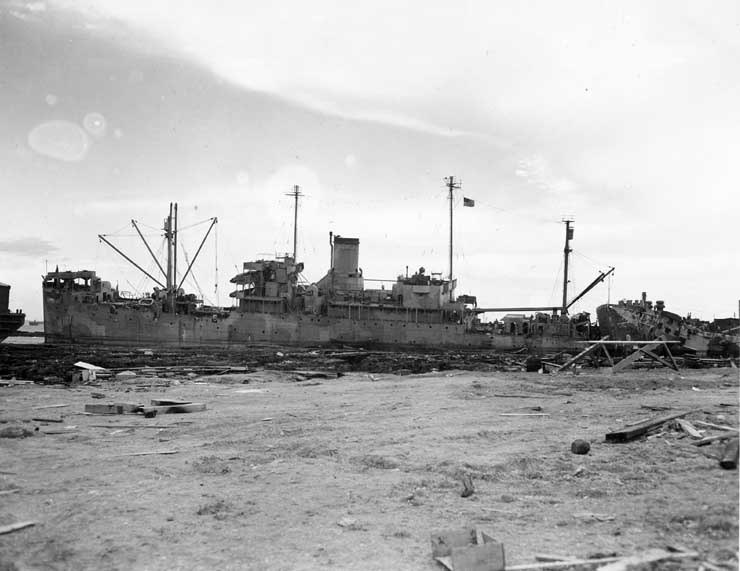
USS Ocelot (IX-110) aground in Buckner Bay, Okinawa, November 1945. Her stern was cut off when USS Nestor (ARB-6), visible to the right, crashed into her during the storm.

=== Present day ===
In the present day, the Buckner Bay – White Beach Naval Port Facility is located on the southernmost tip of the Katsuren Peninsula. The bay is also referred to as Katchin Wan. The White Beach Navy Ammunition Pier and White Beach Army Pier extend into Nakagusuku Bay. Tatsu Kuchi, the main entrance into the bay, is located 18 nmi north-northeast of the southernmost tip of Okinawa. White Beach is also located about 14 nmi northeast of Naha. Numerous large and small islands, reefs, and shoal waters bracket the entrance.

Tengan Pier (26°24.2'N 127°51.1'E) is located at the western end of Kin Wan Bay. Kin Wan Bay is on the east central side of Okinawa between Kin Saki (Kin Point) and the Katsuren Peninsula.

== USFJ/MSDF Facilities ==
There are two piers at White Beach. Navy Pier is under the control of the U.S. Navy Commander Fleet Activities Okinawa (CFAO) and is also used by the Military Sealift Command (MSC) as a back-up ordnance-handling pier. The coordinating authority for U. S. Navy vessels for both piers is Buckner Port Control, White Beach.

Navy Pier is used primarily by U.S. Navy vessels and Japanese Self-Defense Force minesweepers. The pier is approximately 2,400 ft (732 m) long. It consists of a 40 ft (12.2 m) wide by 1,220 ft (372 m) long earth-filled causeway and a 39 ft (11.9 m) wide by 386 ft (117.8 m) long structural causeway that is connected to the main pier. East Navy Pier space for berthing is 790 ft (240.8 m); West Navy Pier space for berthing is 810 ft (246.9 m). The Navy Pier has reinforced concrete pilings with a steel concrete surface. The deck height is 10 ft (3.1 m). Beyond the pier are two 25 ft (7.6 m) by 125 ft (38.1 m) mooring dolphin decks. Ships can moor bow in or bow out at these berths.

The Army Pier is an asphalt-surfaced causeway connecting to a steel pier reinforced with concrete and with a solid facing to the sea floor. The approximate total dimensions of the pier and the causeway are 1,224 ft (373 m) long by 100 ft (30.5 m) wide. The portion of the pier for berthing is approximately 525 ft (160 m) long with a deck height of 10 ft (3.1 m).

The Naha Pilot Association contracts pilot service. Sufficient advance notice must be given for scheduling a pilot and to allow time for the pilot to travel from Naha to Buckner Bay. Three Japanese commercial tugs rated at 3,200 hp are available for White Beach. A pilot is mandatory for U.S. Navy vessels berthing at the White Beach piers but is not required when anchoring. Pilots will not normally board ships with northerly winds greater than 30 kt or southerly winds greater than 26 kt. Wave heights greater than 4.9 ft (1.5 m) make it too difficult to get on or off the ship. All pilots possess adequate English language ability to convey helm and engine orders. Additionally, a qualified Japanese speaking dockmaster will be stationed pierside to assist in docking evolutions. The pilot and working tug primarily use Channel 13 VHF-FM but can be initially contacted via Channel 16 VHF-FM. The pilot pickup point is in the vicinity of 26°14'N 127°55'E. If required, a second tug will normally meet the ship at 26°16.4'N 127°54.3'E.

Anchorage and berthing assignments for Navy vessels are made by the Navy Port Control Officer located at White Beach. Navy Port Control can be contacted via Channel 16 VHF-FM or on 2716 kHz USB.

No repair facilities are located at White Beach.

Tengan Pier is the primary U.S. military ammunition cargo operations site in Okinawa. Ammunition and explosive handling operations are conducted on the pier from 0800 until sunset. Tengan pier has limited shelter from the weather. Anchorage berths can be coordinated through the ship's agent or the local Military Sealift Command Office. Pilot rendezvous point is 26°25'N 127°58'E. Five tugs rated at 3,200 hp are available in Kin Wan Bay.

Tengan Pier is 82 ft (m) wide and 806 ft (m) long with reinforced concrete solid construction. The pier can accommodate two ships with one on each side.

Tengan Pier is connected to land by a 35 ft (m) wide by 1,300 ft (m) long causeway. Ship docking should be self-sustaining. There are no electric shore power outlets, CHT lines, or fuel lines for bunkering.

Approximately 95% of the MSC ships go to White Beach and Tengan Pier because of depth restrictions at the Port of Naha.

No repair facilities are available in the vicinity of Tengan Pier.

== See also ==
- List of shipwrecks in October 1945: 9 October (incomplete)
- Naval Base Okinawa
- Typhoon Louise (1945)
- United States Forces Japan
- USS Nestor (ARB-6)
- USS Ulysses (ARB-9)
- USS Pennsylvania (BB-38)
- Yaeyama-class minesweeper
