= Typhoon Louise (1945) =

Western Pacific typhoon in 1945

Typhoon Louise Akune Typhoon
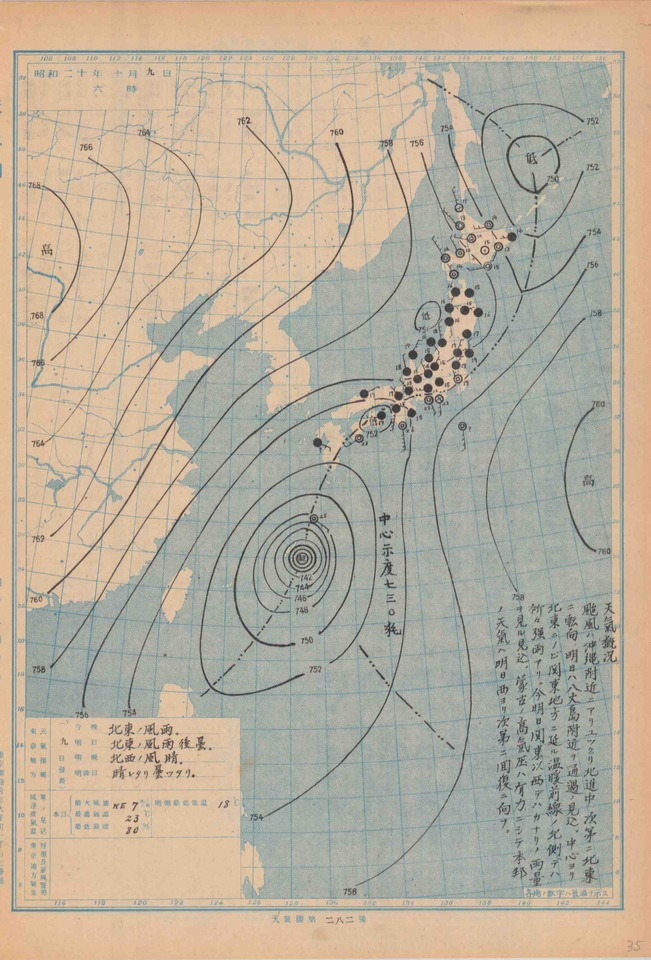
- Typhoon Louise near peak intensity, battering the Nansei Islands on October 9

Meteorological history
- Formed: October 2, 1945
- Dissipated: October 13, 1945

Unknown-strength storm
- 10-minute sustained (JMA)
- Lowest pressure: 969 hPa (mbar); 28.61 inHg

Category 1-equivalent typhoon
- 1-minute sustained (SSHWS/JTWC)
- Highest winds: 120 km/h (75 mph)

Overall effects
- Fatalities: 377 confirmed
- Missing: 74 missing
- Damage: $100,000 (1945 USD)
- Areas affected: Mariana Islands, Guam, Palau, Caroline Islands, Nansei Islands, Japan
- IBTrACS
- Part of the 1945 Pacific typhoon season

Typhoon Louise, known in Japan as the Akune Typhoon (阿久根台風, Akune Taifū), was a deadly and destructive tropical cyclone that hit Japan in October 1945, soon after the cessation of World War II. It caused at least 377 deaths and another 74 missing persons, while leaving a wide swath of damage across the country.

Being the twenty-third named storm and twelfth typhoon of the 1945 Pacific typhoon season, Louise was first seen developing on October 2 near the Caroline Islands. Moving to the northwest, it slowly organized until it strengthened to a tropical storm on the next day. It then passed between the Northern Mariana Islands on the night of October 4, bringing gale-force winds to the archipelago. It remained at that intensity until it started to approach the Ryukyu Islands on October 9, where it strengthened to a minimal typhoon. While at its peak intensity of 120 km/h (75 mph), it devastated the islands, especially Okinawa. It weakened back to a tropical storm on the next day as it curved to the northeast. Louise then passed through the Chūgoku region in Japan, then moved out into the Sea of Japan while further weakening below gale-force winds, before dissipating on October 12 near the Tsugaru Strait.

Data compiled by the Japan Meteorological Agency showed that Louise killed 377 individuals in Japan, with the majority of deaths in the Nansei Islands, but other contemporaneous estimates suggested over 500 fatalities. The sinking and destruction of U.S. naval vessels present as part of the occupation of Japan contributed to the number of missing individuals and deaths.

== Meteorological history ==
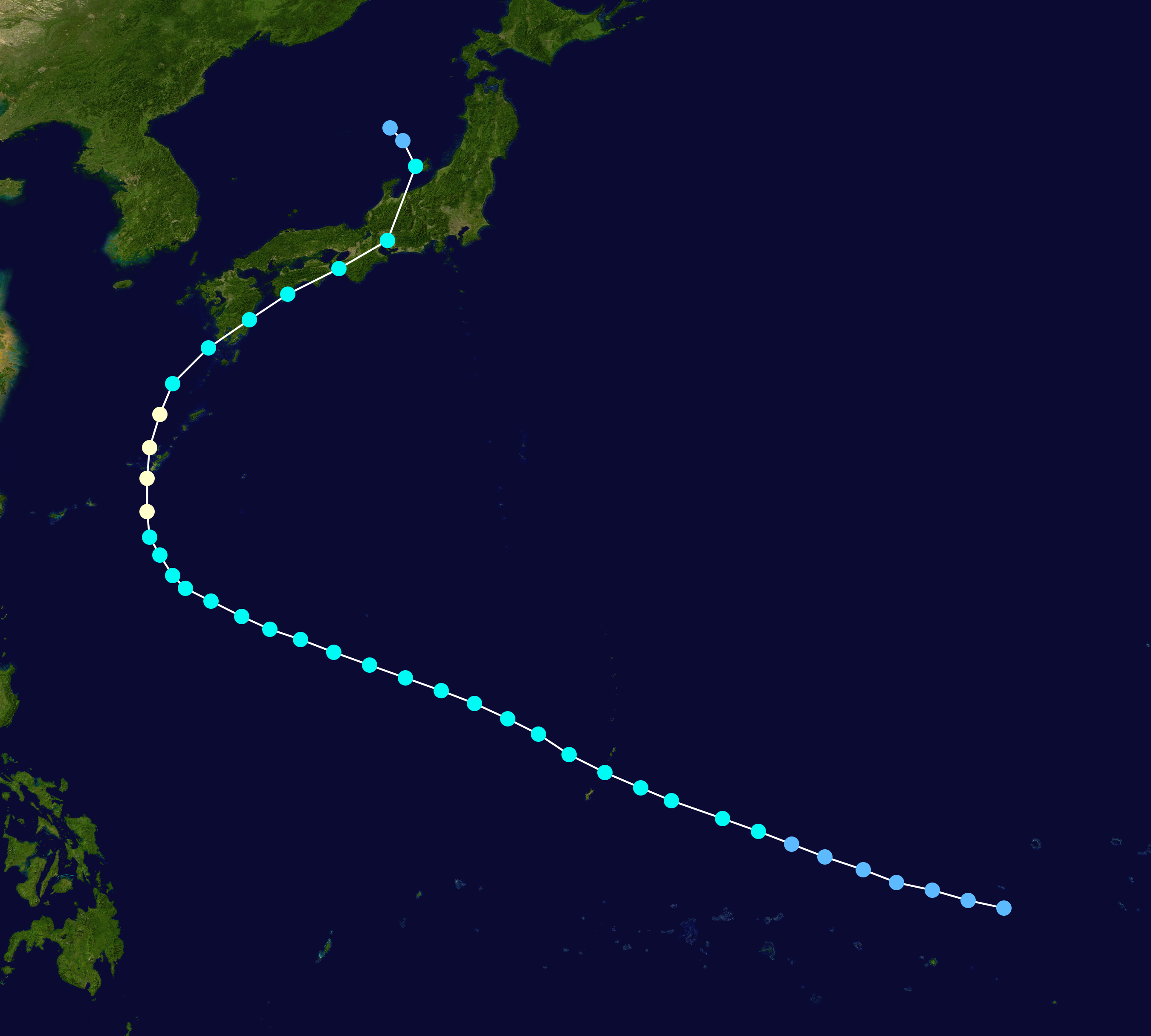
Map plotting the storm's track and intensity, according to the Saffir–Simpson scale Map key Saffir–Simpson scale Tropical depression (≤38 mph, ≤62 km/h) Tropical storm (39–73 mph, 63–118 km/h) Category 1 (74–95 mph, 119–153 km/h) Category 2 (96–110 mph, 154–177 km/h) Category 3 (111–129 mph, 178–208 km/h) Category 4 (130–156 mph, 209–251 km/h) Category 5 (≥157 mph, ≥252 km/h) Unknown Storm type Tropical cyclone Subtropical cyclone Extratropical cyclone, remnant low, tropical disturbance, or monsoon depression

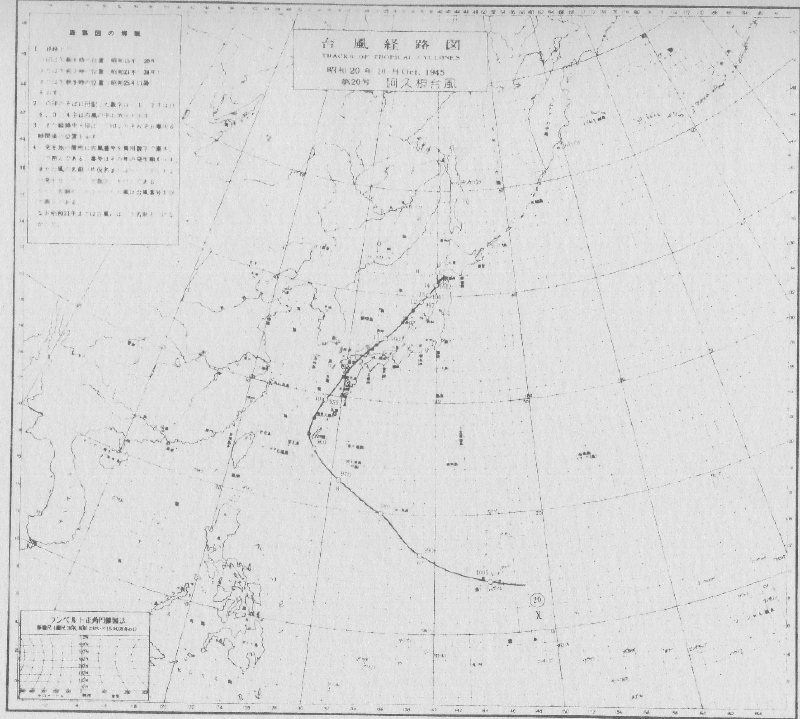
The records of the Japan Meteorological Agency depict a different track from landfall until dissipation.

At 00:00 UTC of October 2, the Fleet Weather Center noted that a tropical depression was developing near the Caroline Islands as a result of an equatorial outflow. Steered by high pressure to its north, it slowly moved to the northwest while organizing, remaining a tropical depression until 18:00 UTC of the next day, when it strengthened to a tropical storm, which the Fleet Center named Louise. Slow intensification occurred, and in the night of October 4, it passed between the islands of Rota and Tinian in the Northern Mariana Islands as a minimal tropical storm. As it moved northwest, the system slowed and fluctuated in strength, but its circulation remained defined. On October 7, Louise started to accelerate, with the Fleet Center forecasting that the storm may continue its northwestward trend and make landfall in Formosa; however, a high-pressure near the Philippines turned the system to the north, threatening Okinawa. Early the next day, the system strengthened to a minimal typhoon as it started to enter the East China Sea and impact the Nansei Islands. At that time until the next day, it started to batter the area while at peak intensity of 120 km/h (75 mph). It held its intensity for 21 hours until it weakened back to a tropical storm later that night as it started to curve towards the west, approaching the Japanese archipelago. A combination of unfavorable conditions and a plume of cold air further weakened Louise before making landfall somewhere near Akune in Kagoshima Prefecture on October 10. It continued moving to the northeast, passing through the Chūgoku region before accelerating to the Sea of Japan, just before extratropical transition.

On the IBTrACS records by the National Climatic Data Center, Louise moved to the east-northeast after striking the Chūgoku region, passing through the town of Ainan in Ehime Prefecture before moving through the Wakayama Bay, prior to making landfall in its prefecture. It then shifted to the north-northeast, entering the country's main sea, before dissipating on October 12. However, the data from the Japan Meteorological Agency showed that the system, after its landfall in the region, moved through the Sea of Japan before passing near Noto Peninsula, ahead of becoming extratropical on October 12. It then dissipated on the next day, just before entering the Tsugaru Strait.

== Impact ==
Significant typhoons with special names (from the Japan Meteorological Agency)
Name	Number	Japanese name
Ida	T4518	Makurazaki Typhoon (枕崎台風)
Louise	T4523	Akune Typhoon (阿久根台風)
Marie	T5415	Tōya Maru Typhoon (洞爺丸台風)
Ida	T5822	Kanogawa Typhoon (狩野川台風)
Sarah	T5914	Miyakojima Typhoon (宮古島台風)
Vera	T5915	Isewan Typhoon (伊勢湾台風)
Nancy	T6118	2nd Muroto Typhoon (第2室戸台風)
Cora	T6618	2nd Miyakojima Typhoon (第2宮古島台風)
Della	T6816	3rd Miyakojima Typhoon (第3宮古島台風)
Babe	T7709	Okinoerabu Typhoon (沖永良部台風)
Faxai	T1915	Reiwa 1 Bōsō Peninsula Typhoon (令和元年房総半島台風)
Hagibis	T1919	Reiwa 1 East Japan Typhoon (令和元年東日本台風)

Louise had a devastating effect on Japan, with casualties including at least 377 persons dead, 202 injured, and 74 missing, and contemporaneous reports estimated over 500 fatalities, with most occurring in the Nansei Islands. At least 6,181 establishments and houses were destroyed, and 174,146 more were flooded and sustained inundation damage. Farmlands were widely affected.

A number of factors combined to intensify the overall damage. Most immediate was significant rainfall both in the leadup to Louise and also during the approach of Typhoon Ida one month prior. On a longer scale, Japan’s war efforts had caused significant overlogging, which produced erosion-induced river flooding and the loss of intertidal forests which would have otherwise served as a storm buffer. At the same time, domestic hydraulic engineering projects were suspended and progress on river improvement slowed due to lack of funding.

=== U.S. naval losses ===
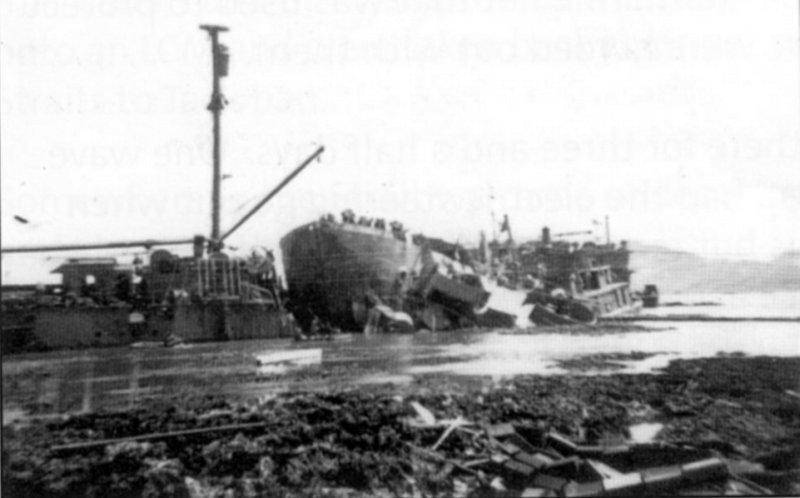
USS Nestor, washed ashore in Okinawa’s Nakagusuku Bay

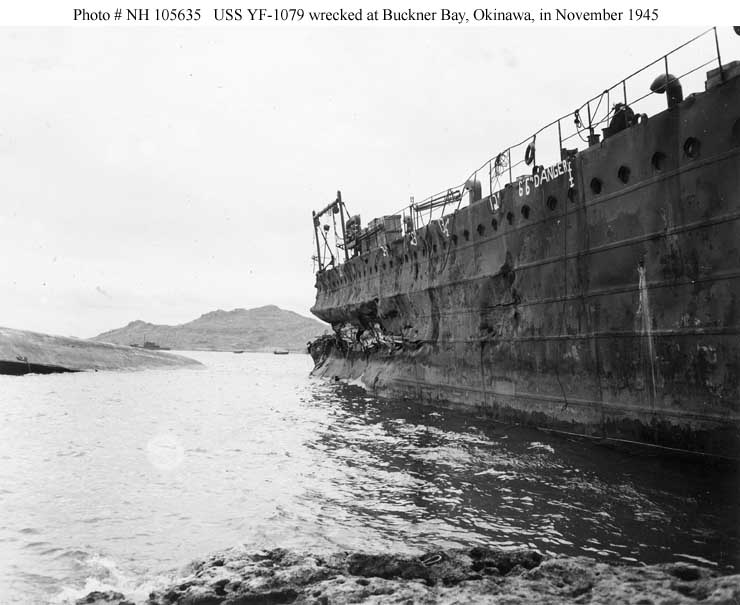
YF-1079 (right) and a sunk ship, possibly YF-757, (left) in Nakagusuku Bay

Okinawa prefecture was occupied by the United States military following the end of World War II, and the U.S. Navy incurred significant losses during the storm. Forecasters had predicted that Louise would head for Taiwan rather than tracking north, and the sudden change in direction left U.S. warships and boats moored in Nakagusuku Bay (called Buckner Bay by U.S. forces) unable to escape to the safety of open sea and facing waves up to 35 feet within the narrow bay. Twelve ships were sunk, 222 were stranded, and 32 were wrecked.

At the Navy Air Base, 80% of military buildings (many of which were prefabricated Quonset huts) collapsed, and 60 aircraft were destroyed. The U.S. military suffered 36 deaths, 47 missing persons, and 100 serious injuries. One seaman stationed there, John L. Vandebrul, recollected:

[...] we didn't trust our tents so we went up into the hills. We watched the entire camp being blown all over and out of 250 tents, only 20 were left standing. The warehouses were blown down and they were made of steel so that gives you an idea of how strong the wind was. It came at about 110 miles per hour [...]. We are still rebuilding the camp which is one mess and I don't mean maybe.
