= Concrete ship =

Ship whose hull is primarily made of concrete

Concrete ships are ships with hulls built primarily with concrete reinforced with steel rather than steel or wood. There are also similar ships made of ferrocement. The advantages of concrete construction are that materials are cheaper and readily available, maintenance is easier, they are fire-resistant, and the ships experience fewer vibrations. The disadvantages are that their labor and operating costs are higher, the ships weigh more, and they are less durable than steel.

During the late 19th century, there were concrete river barges and pleasure craft in Europe, and during both World War I and World War II, steel shortages led the US military to order the construction of small fleets of ocean-going concrete ships. Few concrete ships were completed in time to see wartime service during World War I, but concrete ships and barges were used to support Allied forces in World War II.

== History ==
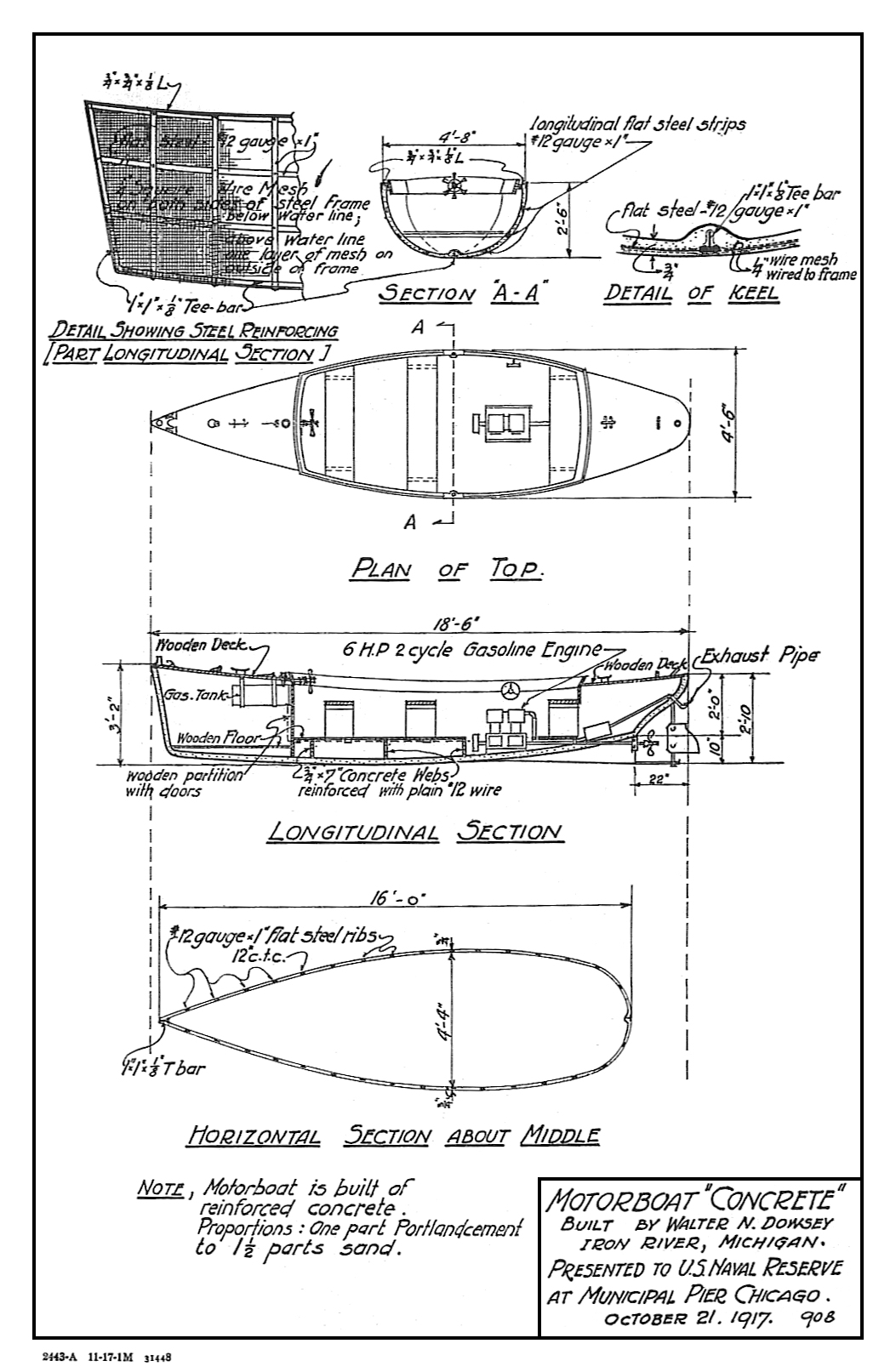
Blueprints for a concrete boat

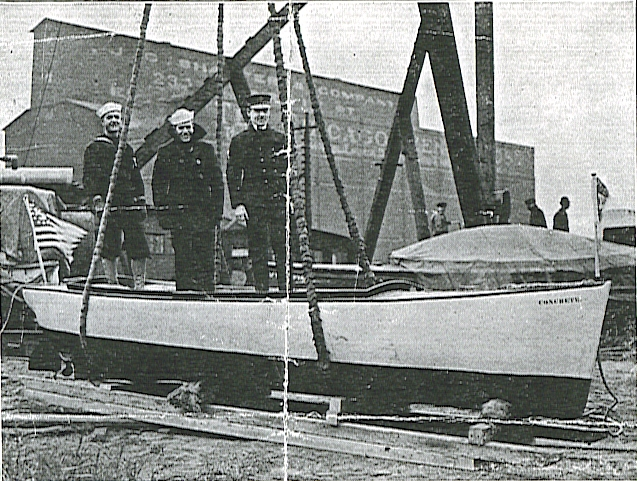
Concrete boat constructed by Walter Dowsey hauled out in Chicago

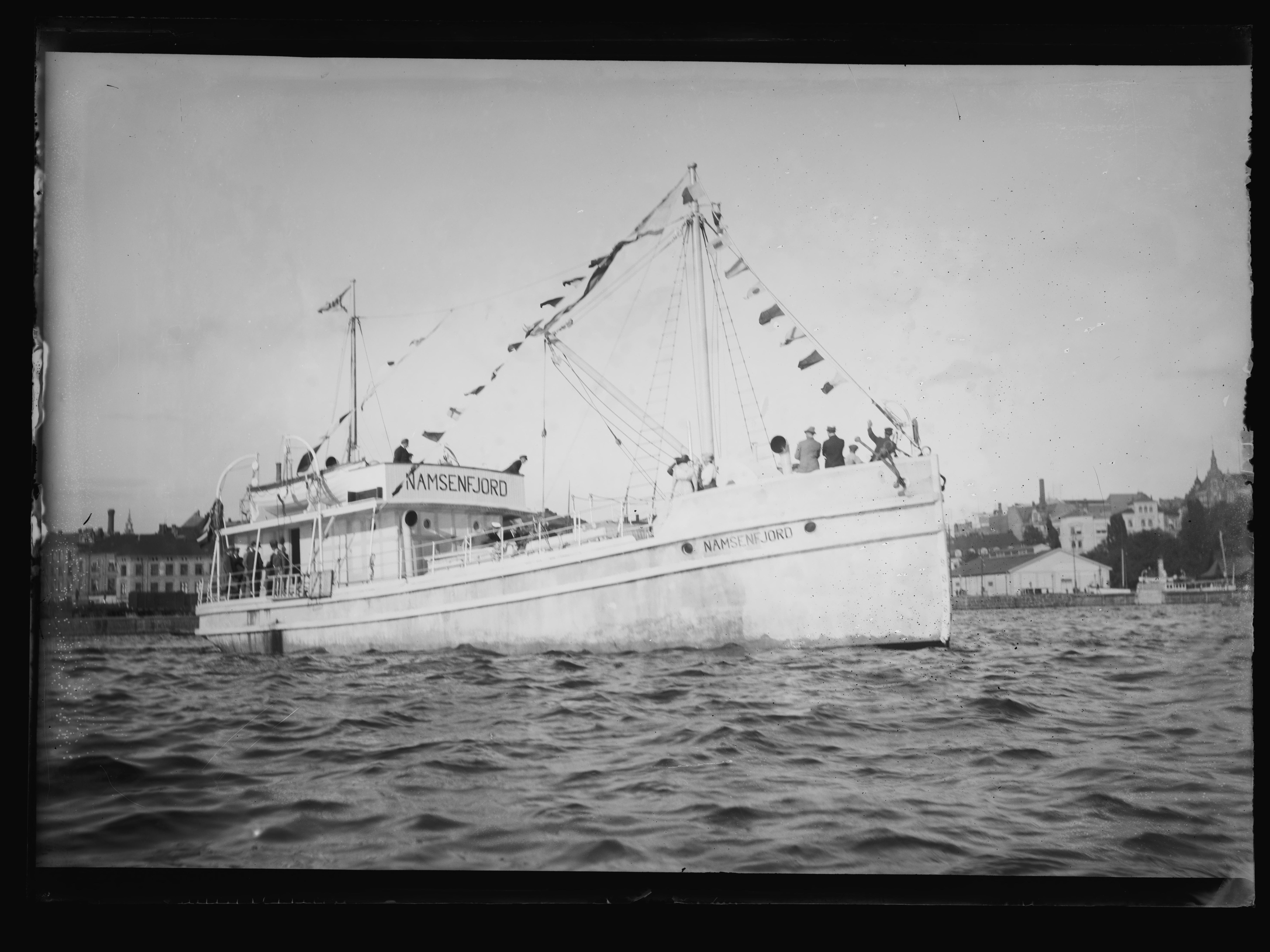
The Namsenfjord

=== First efforts ===
The oldest known example is a rowboat built by Joseph-Louis Lambot in France in 1849. Lambot's boat was featured in the Exposition Universelle held in Paris in 1855.

Over the next sixty years, concrete barges and small ships were built for use on canals and rivers, including in Canada, England, France, Germany, Holland, (Note: Including De Zeemeeuw (The Seagull), an 1887 ferrocement sloop that remained in regular use until 1967.) Italy, Panama, Norway, Norway, and the United States. Ferrocement craft were also built for recreational use.

Based on experience with a concrete lighter in Manilla, Nicolay Fougner of Norway launched the Namsenfjord, the first seagoing concrete ship, on August 2, 1917. With the success of this ship, about twenty more concrete vessels were produced by him, including the Staal-Beton, the first concrete tug and icebreaker; the first concrete floating dock; and the Ildjemsflu, the first concrete lightship. In 1918, Fougner incorporated an American shipbuilding company, which constructed a number of concrete ships. These include the first concrete oil tanker, on behalf of Standard Oil, the Socony 200, the first concrete harbor barge; and the SS Polias, for the Emergency Fleet Corporation.

In 1917, California businessman William Leslie Comyn began looking into building concrete ships. He formed the San Francisco Shipbuilding Company and hired Alan Macdonald and Victor Poss to design the first concrete ship in the United States, a 5,000 DWT (Note: As designed. Her actual deadweight tonnage was lower in practice.) steamer named the SS Faith. The Faith was launched March 14, 1918. She was used to carry bulk cargo for trade until 1921.

=== World War I ===
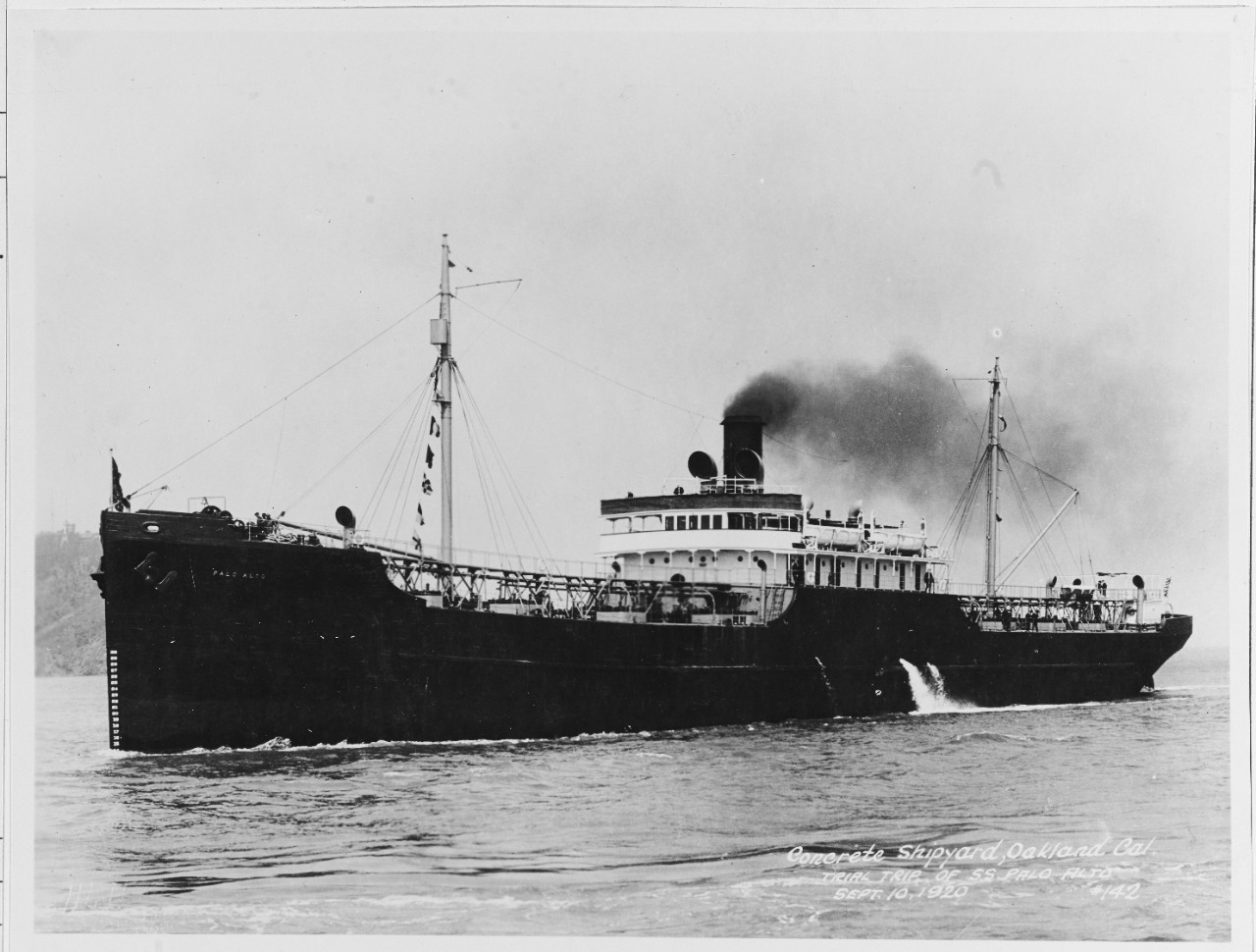
The American concrete oil tanker SS Palo Alto, originally meant for merchant service in the first World War, but completed in 1919

In October 1917, the U.S. government consulted with Fougner on the building of concrete ships in the United States. On April 12, 1918, President Woodrow Wilson authorized the Emergency Fleet Corporation concrete ship program, which oversaw the construction of concrete ships for the war. The builders of concrete ships had to prepare their own yards instead of converted existing ones for wooden ship, so their deployment was delayed. When the war ended, none had yet been completed, and any of the ships that were not significantly far along in their construction were canceled, leaving only twelve of them. These twelve ships (Note: SS Atlantus, SS Cape Fear, SS Cuyamaca, SS Dinsmore, SS Latham, SS Moffit, SS Palo Alto, SS Peralta, SS Polias, SS San Pasqual, SS Sapona, and SS Selma) were eventually completed, but soon sold to private companies who used them for trading, storage, and scrap. They amounted to 69,000 DWT of the 560,000 DWT that were ordered.

The United Kingdom's Ministry of Shipping also had an extensive concrete ship program. It had ordered 250,000 DWT of concrete ships, though with the war's end, only 2,000 DWT were delivered. Their first seagoing concrete vessel was the 1,150 DWT freighter SS Armistice.

Other countries that pursued concrete ship construction during this period included Denmark, (Note: The 1,800 DWT SS Bartels) Italy (Note: The 4,700 tons of displacement Persivoranza, the largest concrete ship at the time) and Sweden. (Note: The MS Linnea, a submarine-like vessel of 700 DWT))

=== Interwar ===
With the surplus of WWI ships and the uncompetitive operation of concrete ships, there was little interest in the construction of new concrete cargo ships. Those completed as a result of World War I programs continued to be used for various purposes.

=== World War II ===
In 1942, after the U.S. entered World War II, the U.S. military found that its contractors had steel shortages. Consequently, the U.S. government contracted McCloskey & Company of Philadelphia, Pennsylvania to build 24 self-propelled concrete ships. Construction started in July 1943. The shipyard was at Hookers Point in Tampa, Florida, and at its peak, it employed 6,000 workers. The U.S. government also contracted with two companies in California for the construction of eighty concrete barges. A total capacity of 488,000 DWT was produced.

In Europe, concrete ships played a role in World War II operations, where they were used for cargo transportation and as corncobs during the Normandy landings. The United Kingdom produced hundreds of concrete barges, and some 4,000 DWT of seagoing concrete ships. To save on steel, Germany also experimented with prestressed concrete in barges and produced 18,000 DWT of large seagoing concrete ships. Scandinavian shipyards produced 2,000 DWT of seagoing concrete ships.

Some concrete barges were fitted with engines and used as mobile canteens and troop carriers. Some of these vessels survive as abandoned wrecks or sea defenses (against storm surges) in the Thames Estuary including near Rainham Marshes. Two remain in civil use as moorings at Westminster.

Concrete barges also served in the Pacific during 1944 and 1945. (Note: See, for example, USS Quartz.)

In 1944, a concrete firm in California proposed a submarine-shaped freighter which was projected to achieve speeds of 75 knots (139 km/h; 86 mph), a claim which Popular Science called "seemingly extravagant".

One concrete barge under tow by Jicarilla (ATF-104) was lost off Saipan during a typhoon, and another barge damaged the Moreton Bay Pile Light in Brisbane, but the rest served admirably.

=== Post-war ===
After the war, concrete vessels have been used as pontoons, barges, and offshore concrete structures around the world, but no further large ships were produced.

One wartime barge, previously beached at Canvey Island, was removed in 2005 by the local sailing club, whose land it was on, for fear it was a "danger to children using it as a playground".

== Modern concrete ships ==
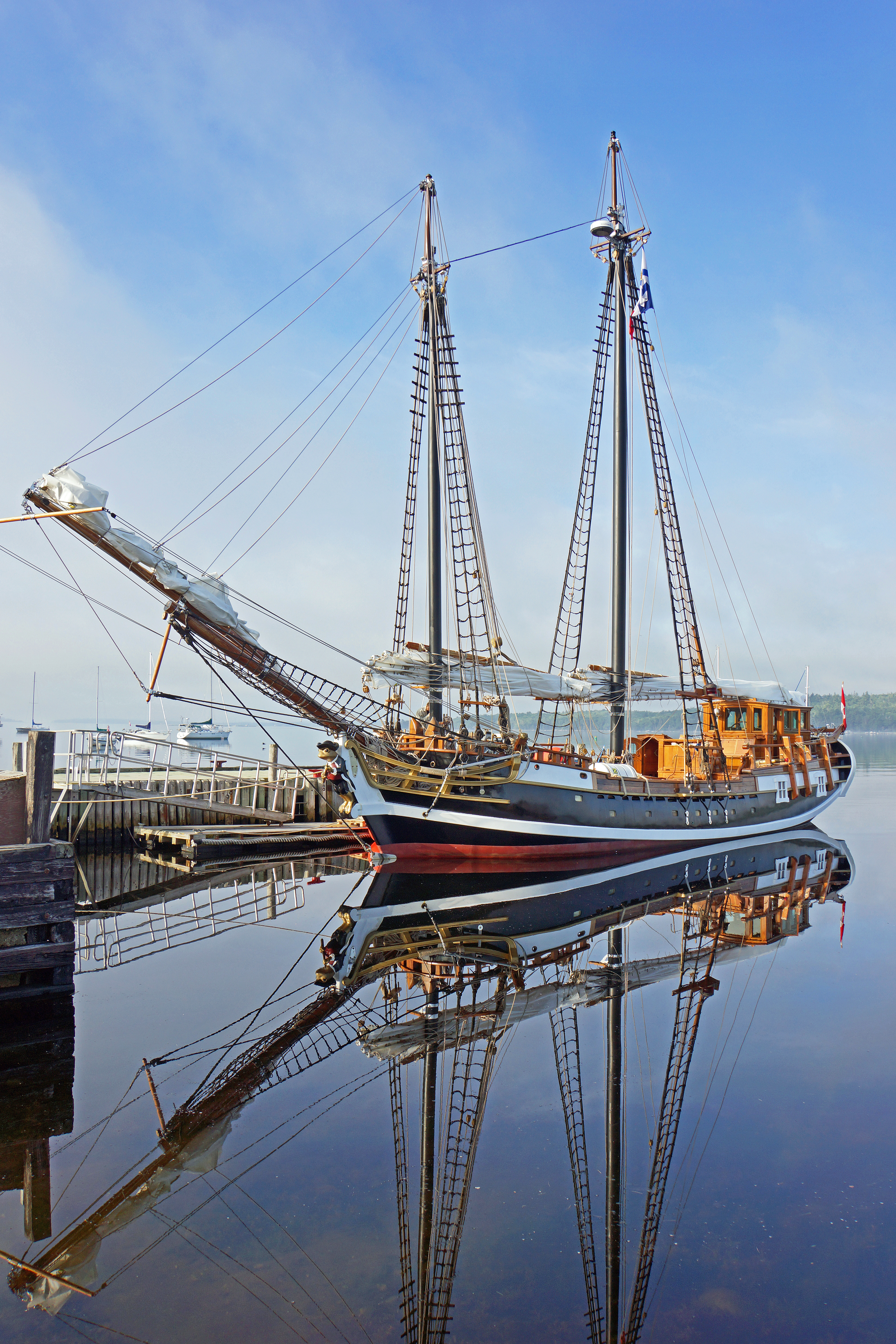
The concrete-hulled schooner Larinda was launched in 1996.

Hobbyists build ferrocement boats (ferroboats), as their construction methods do not require special tools, and the materials are comparatively cheap. Since the 1960s, the American Society of Civil Engineers has sponsored the National Concrete Canoe Competition.

In Europe, especially the Netherlands, concrete is still used to build some of the barges on which houseboats are built.

=== Remaining wartime ships ===
Surviving wartime concrete ships are no longer in use as ships. Several continue in use in various forms, mostly as museums or breakwaters.

==== Europe ====
One of the concrete ships built for the first Ministry of Shipping, the SS Creteboom, lies abandoned in the River Moy, 54.135515°N 9.138452°W just outside the town of Ballina, County Mayo, Ireland.

The Purton Hulks, a collection of vessels intentionally beached at Purton during the first half of the twentieth century as a method to prevent coastal erosion, includes eight ferro-concrete barges.

The remains of a British coaster, Violette, can be seen at Hoo, Kent, England.

A large collection of abandoned concrete barges are seen at River Thames in Rainham, London. 51.498608°N 0.18202°E

The wreckage of the Eisenbeton-Seefrachter D62, a small Nazi-era German freighter, is visible in Dąbie Lake, near Szczecin, Poland. Her incomplete hull was handed to Polish Shipping from the Oder used it as a barge for storing ores. It sank on 20th December 1947 unexpectedly while it was at the Wulkan Quay. numerous refloating attempts to move the D62 were made. In April 8th 1975, Polish authorities decided to lift it and tow it to Dąbie Lake by three tugboats and scuttled at 53°31′31.3″N 14°39′1.9″E. There were plans by employees from Warski Shipyard to be converted into a swimming pool but it was abandoned in the shallow waters, where it has remained since.

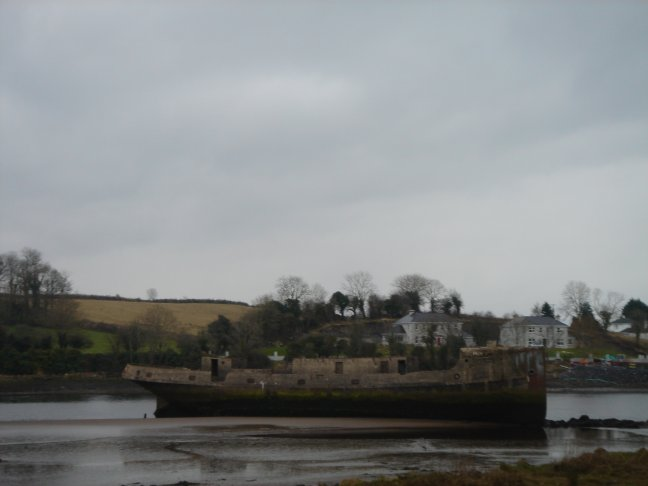
SS Creteboom

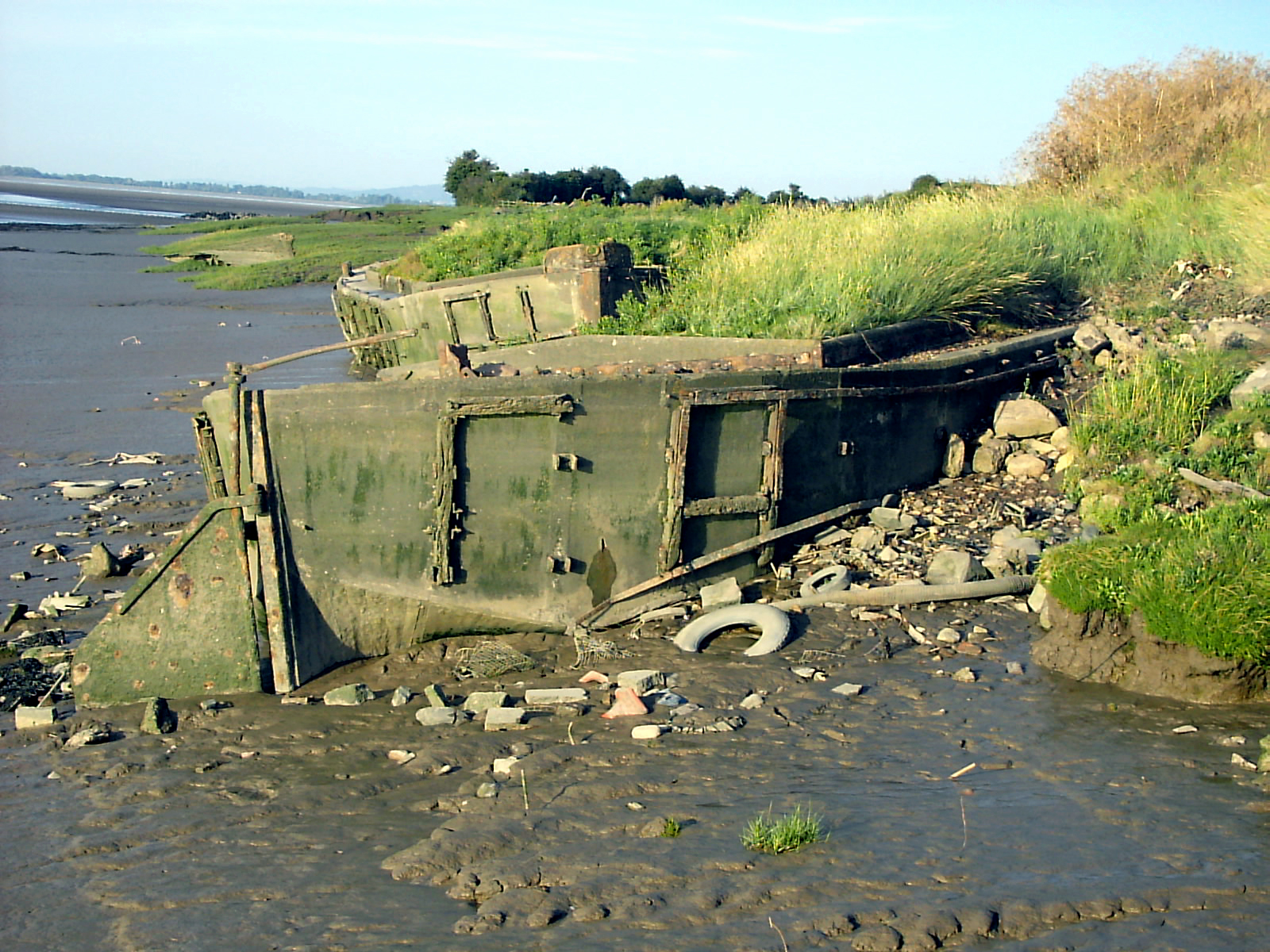
At Purton

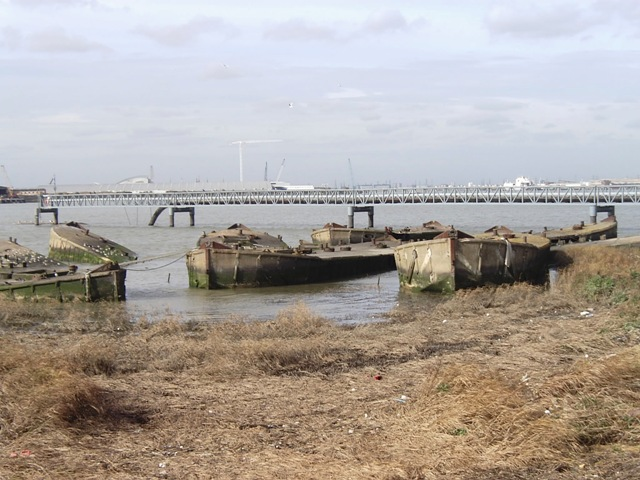
At Rainham

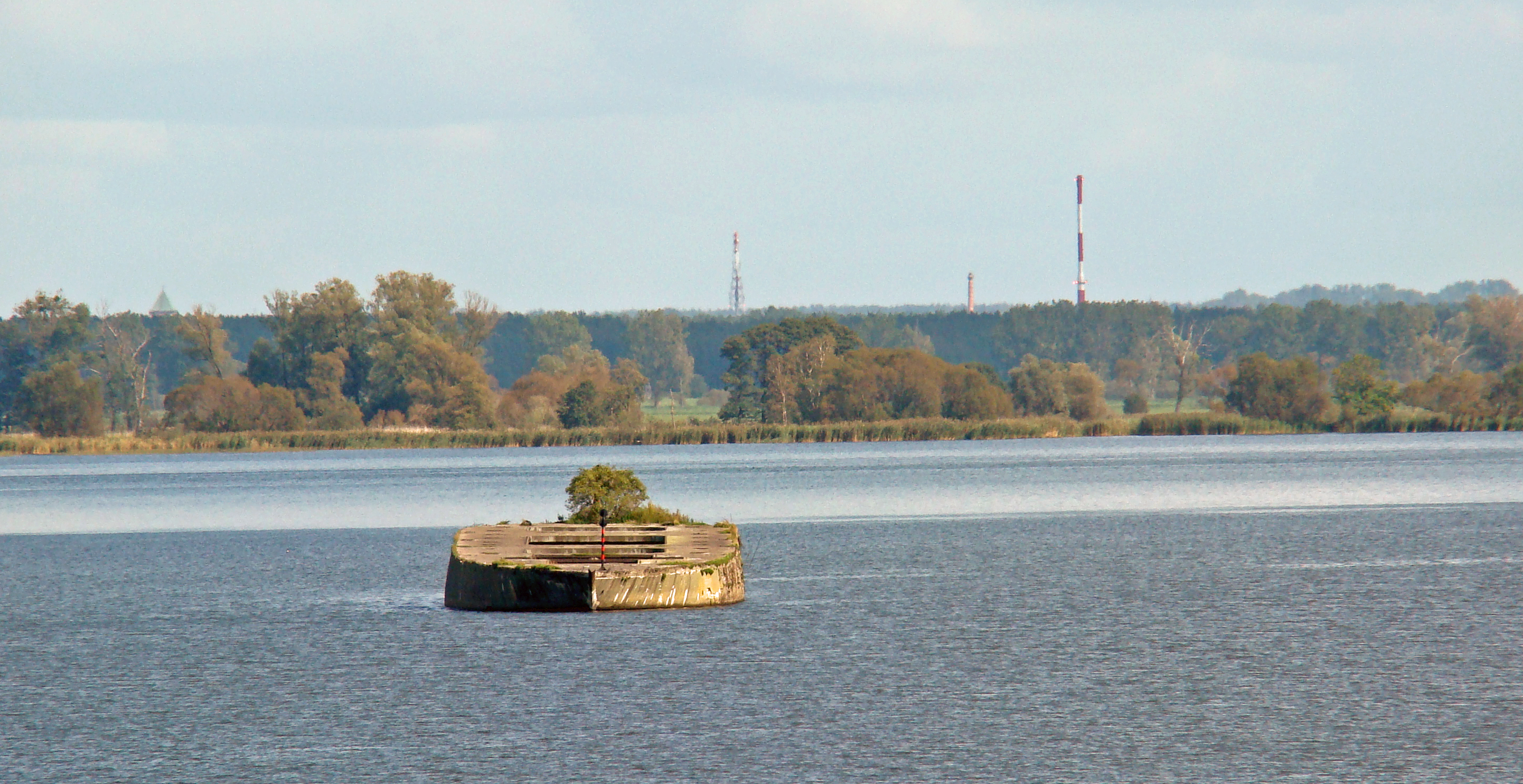
Eisenbeton-Seefrachter D62

During the German occupation of Greece (1942–1944) during World War II, the German Army built 24 concrete cargo vessels for transporting goods to various Greek islands, including Crete. These were constructed in the Perama shipbuilding area of Piraeus. After the war, many of the vessels were used as piers (e.g., in Rafina, 38.022056°N 24.010368°E) and breakwaters (e.g., in Agios Georgios, Methana, 37.638340°N 23.394544°E).

Due to the need to deliver necessary raw materials (such as oil, weapons, ammunition, food and drugs) through mined river currents, Adolf Hitler ordered the production of fifty concrete ships for different purposes. Most were concrete barges made for oil transportation from Romania, and needed raw materials that were driven to the Baltic front. A smaller number of ships was intended for transporting food (specializing in cold storages). The most valuable ships were the specialized ship-hospitals, which evacuated seriously wounded and "important" soldiers to German hospitals along rivers.

==== Japan ====
Several concrete ships were grounded on the west beach of Iwo To (Iwo Jima) in Japan, 24.78238°N 141.293095°E, to make a breakwater by the US forces in 1945. Most of them were broken by typhoons but one was used as a pier.

Japan built four Takechi Maru-class concrete ships (武智丸) during World War II. After the war, two of them turned into a breakwater in Kure, Hiroshima, 34.280089°N 132.756295°E.

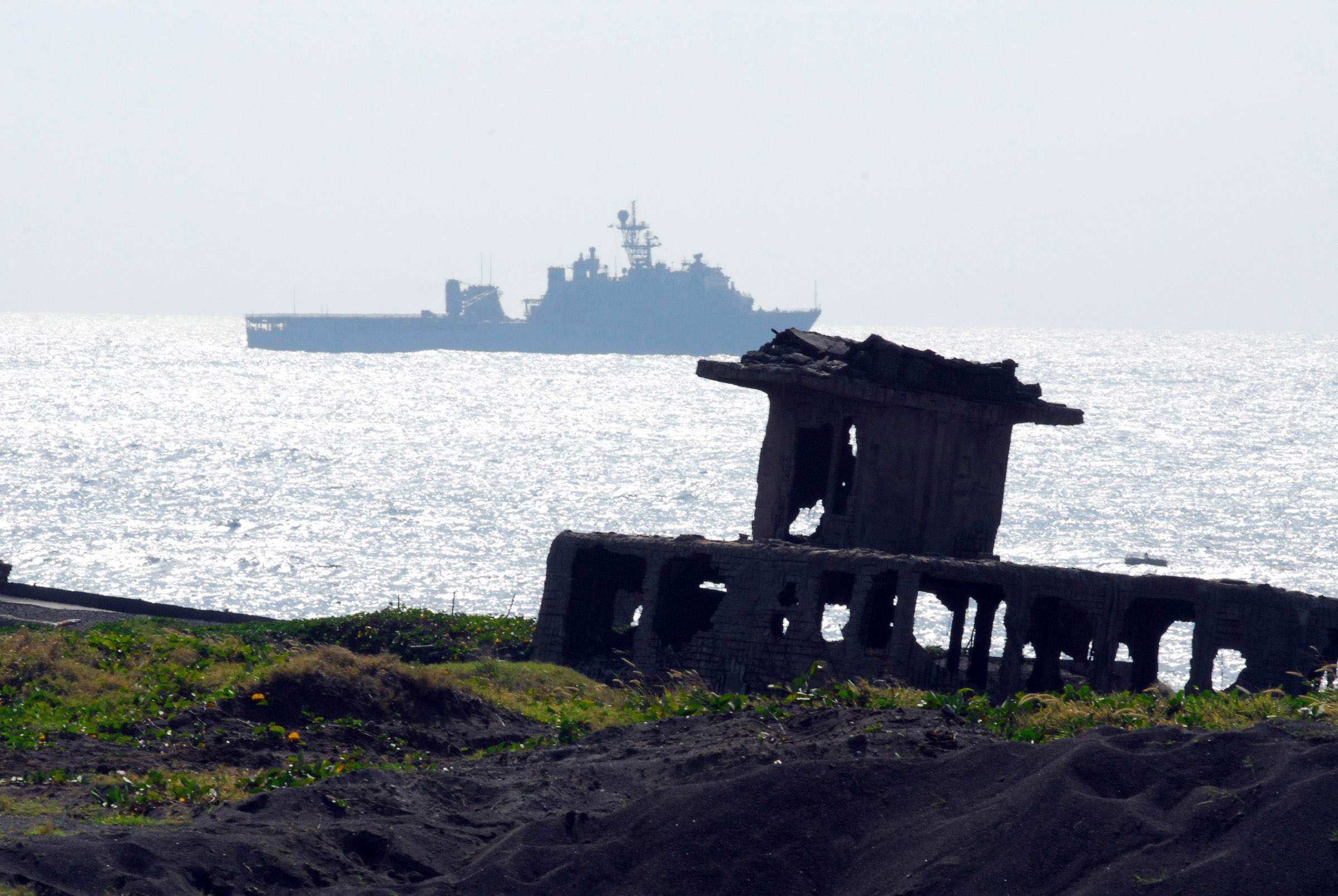
At Iwo To

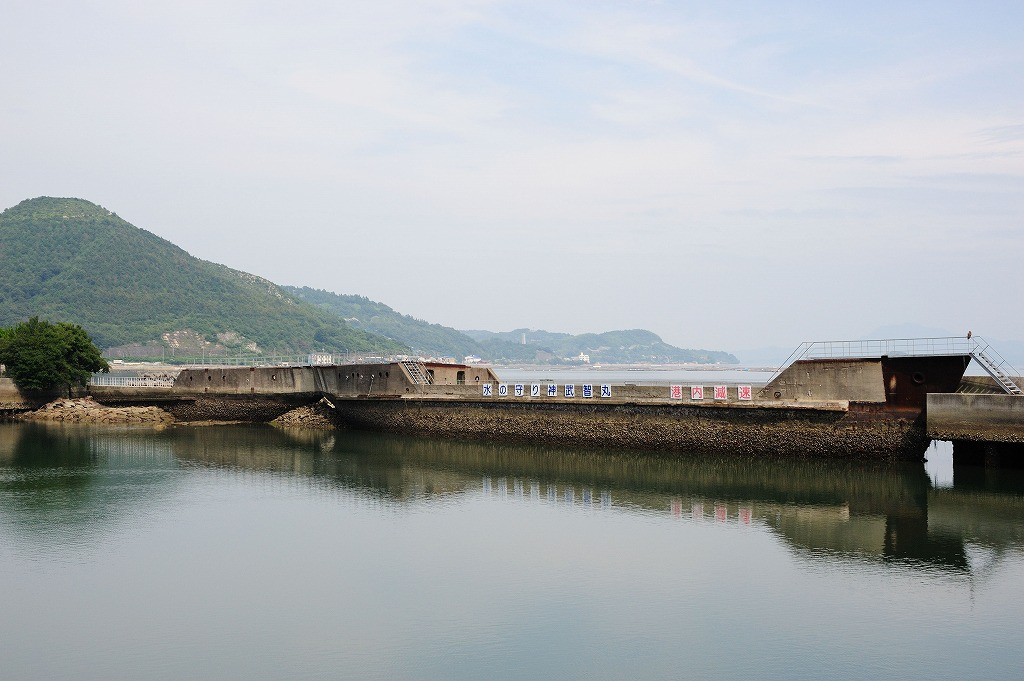
Takechi Maru No.2

==== North America ====
The largest collection is at Powell River, British Columbia, 49.865238°N 124.555821°W, where a lumber mill uses ten floating concrete ships as a breakwater, known as The Hulks.

The Kiptopeke Breakwater in Chesapeake Bay, Virginia, 37.164267°N 75.991402°W, is formed by nine sunken concrete ships built in World War II.

SS San Pasqual, a former oil tanker, lies abandoned off the coast of Cayo Las Brujas, Cuba, 22.623439°N 79.22327°W, where it served as a hotel, then as a base for divers.

The wreckage of SS Atlantus is visible off Sunset Beach near Cape May, New Jersey, 38.944322°N 74.972083°W.

The tanker SS Selma is located northwest of the fishing pier at Seawolf Park in Galveston, 29.344249°N 94.786343°W. The ship was launched the same day Germany signed the Treaty of Versailles, ending the war, so it never saw wartime duty and instead was used as an oil tanker in the Gulf of Mexico.

The tanker SS Palo Alto was purchased and turned into an amusement pier, and is still visible at Seacliff State Beach, near Aptos, California, 36.969704°N 121.913947°W. It broke up during a January 2017 storm.

The SS McKittrick, launched in 1921 in Wilmington, North Carolina, later became the SS Monte Carlo, a gambling ship off Coronado, California, that ran aground on December 31, 1936. The wreck is periodically exposed by strong storm tides.

The vessel aground in the surf at Shipwreck Beach on the north shore of Lanai, Hawaii is the wreck of YOG-42, 20.921299°N 156.910139°W, a concrete gasoline barge built for the US Navy in 1942 and placed in service in 1943. The wreck is often misidentified as a Liberty ship.

The wreckage of the SS Sapona is visible slightly south of Bimini Island in the Bahamas, 25.65063°N 79.29337°W. It is a popular snorkeling site and boating landmark in the area.

Offshore from Nyack, New York in the Hudson River at 41.08785°N 73.91422°W are the remains of a 550-ton oil barge (either the Socony 50 or Socony 201), built in 1918 or 1919 by Fougner, for the Standard Oil Company of New York. This barge, along with eight wooden barges, were sunk in January 1955 to extend the Nyack Memorial Park into the Hudson River by 4 acres. The plan was to infill the space enclosed by the barges with rubble from demolition of U.S. Route 9W during construction of the Tappan Zee Bridge. The park extension was never completed, and the wooden barges have disintegrated, but the concrete barge remains.

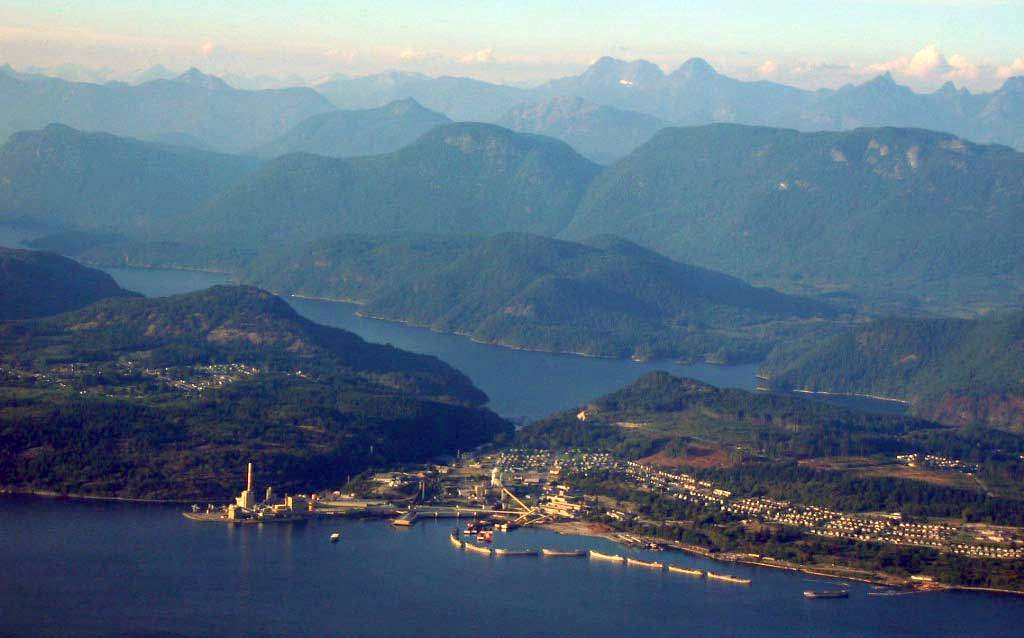
At Powell River

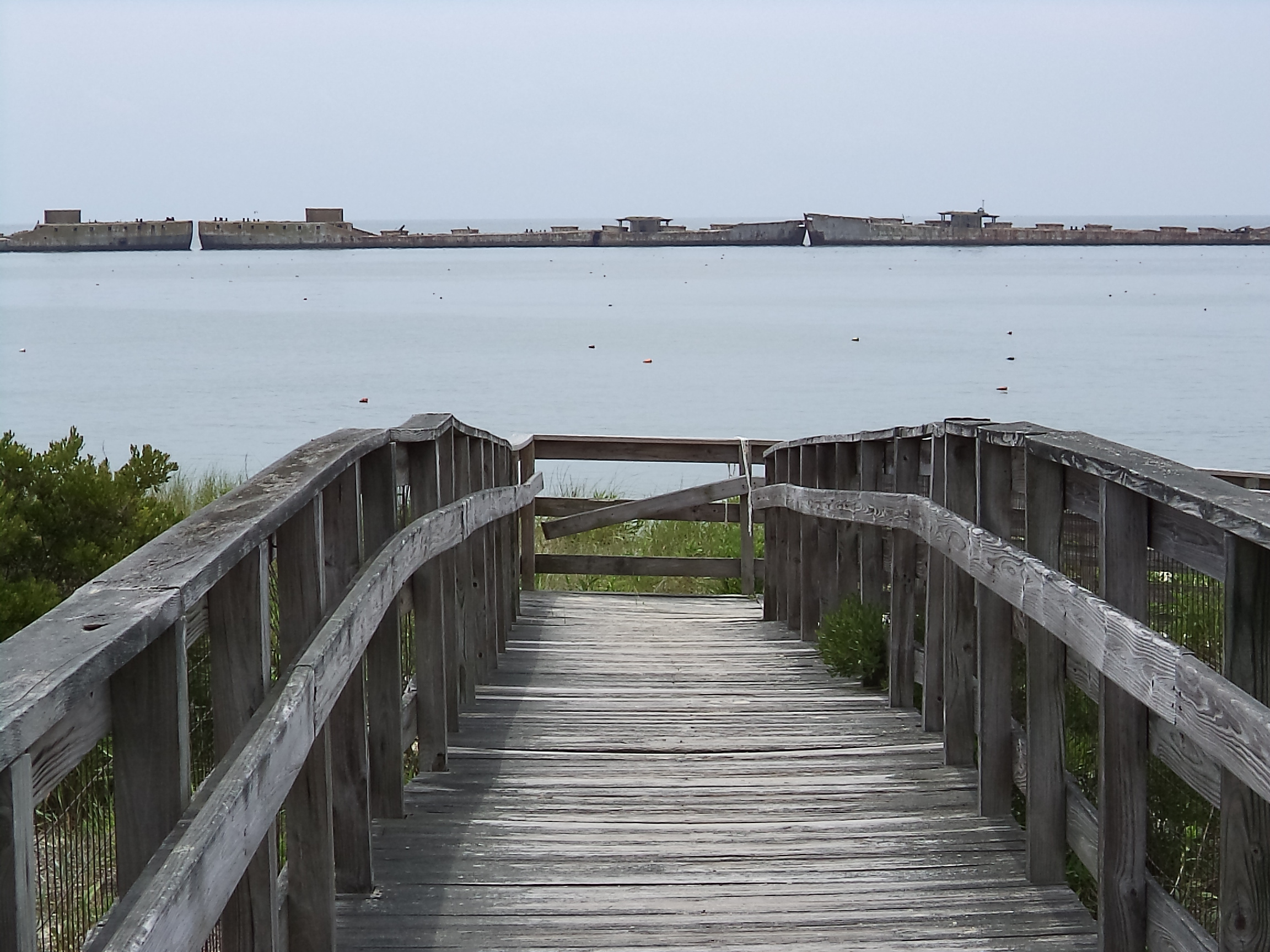
At Kiptopeke

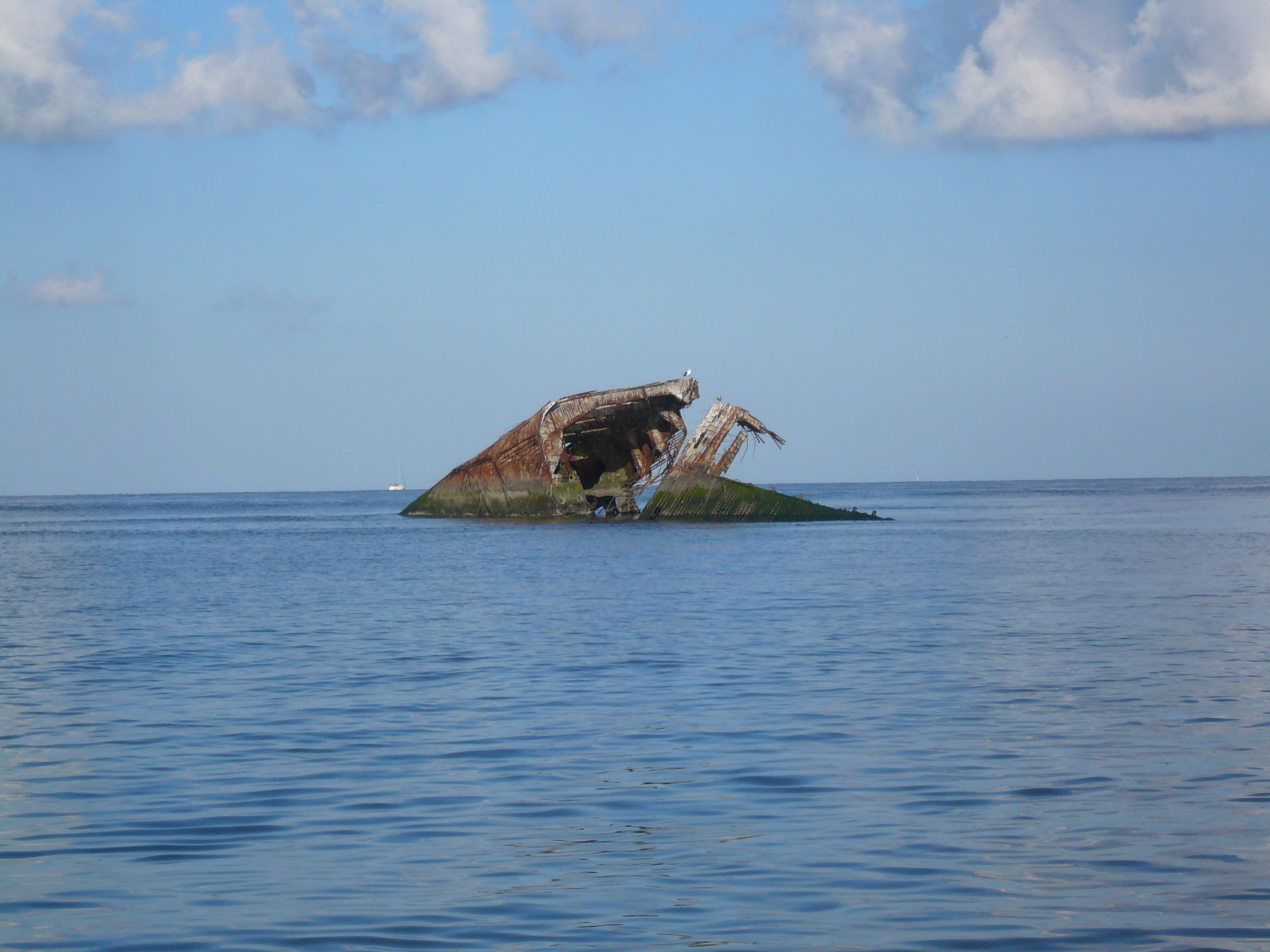
SS Atlantus

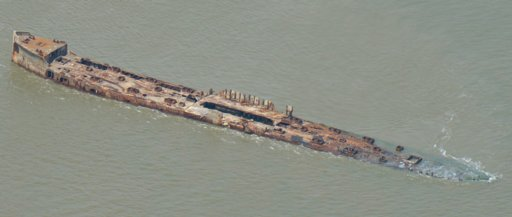
SS Selma

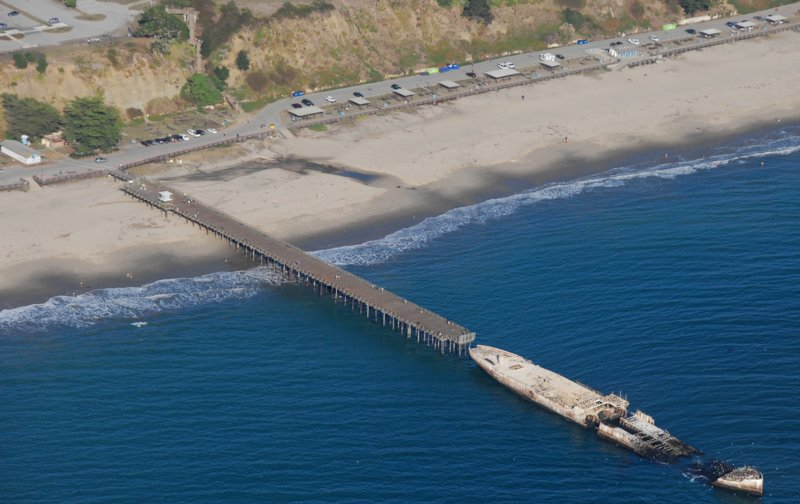
SS Palo Alto

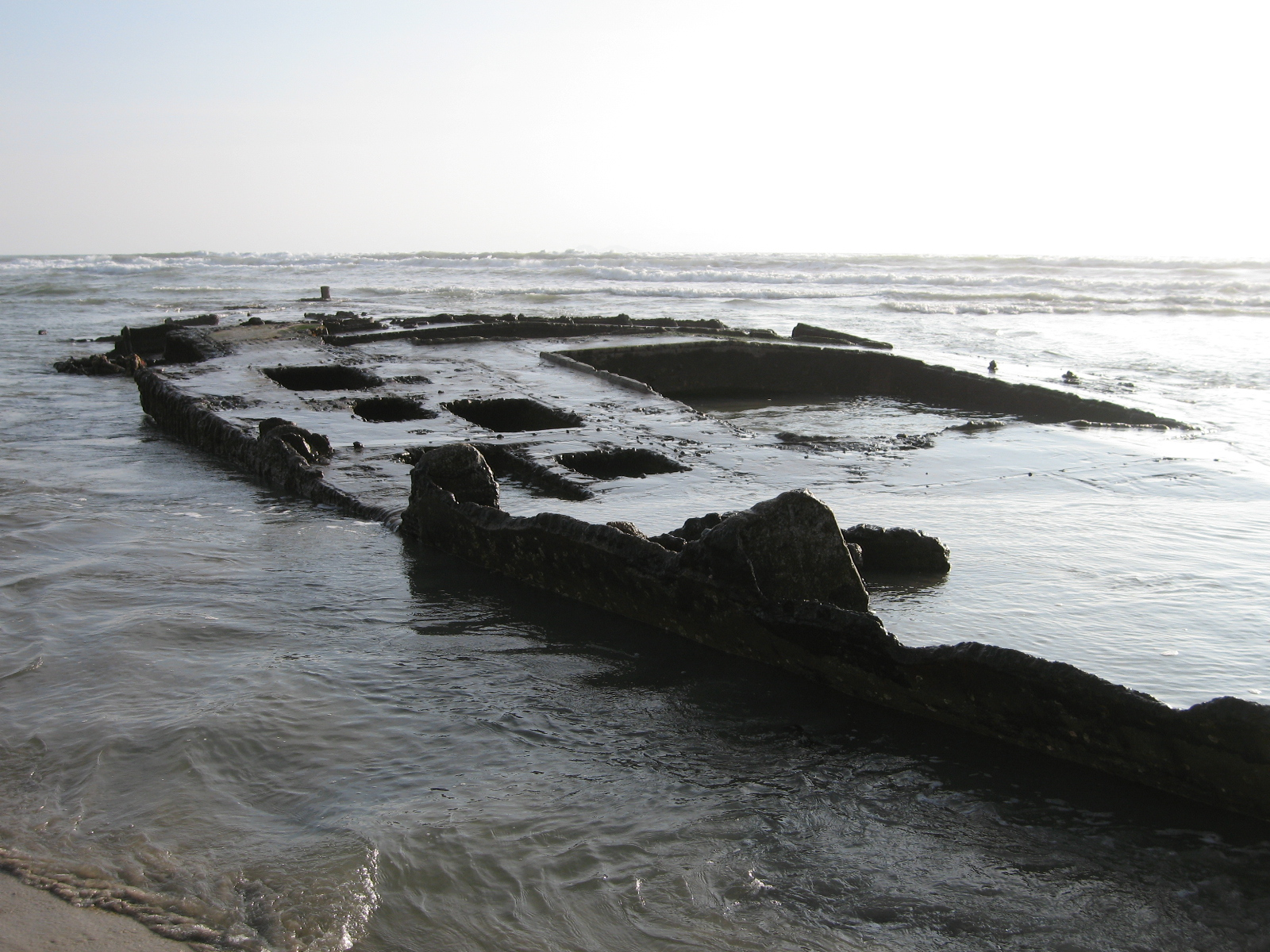
SS Monte Carlo

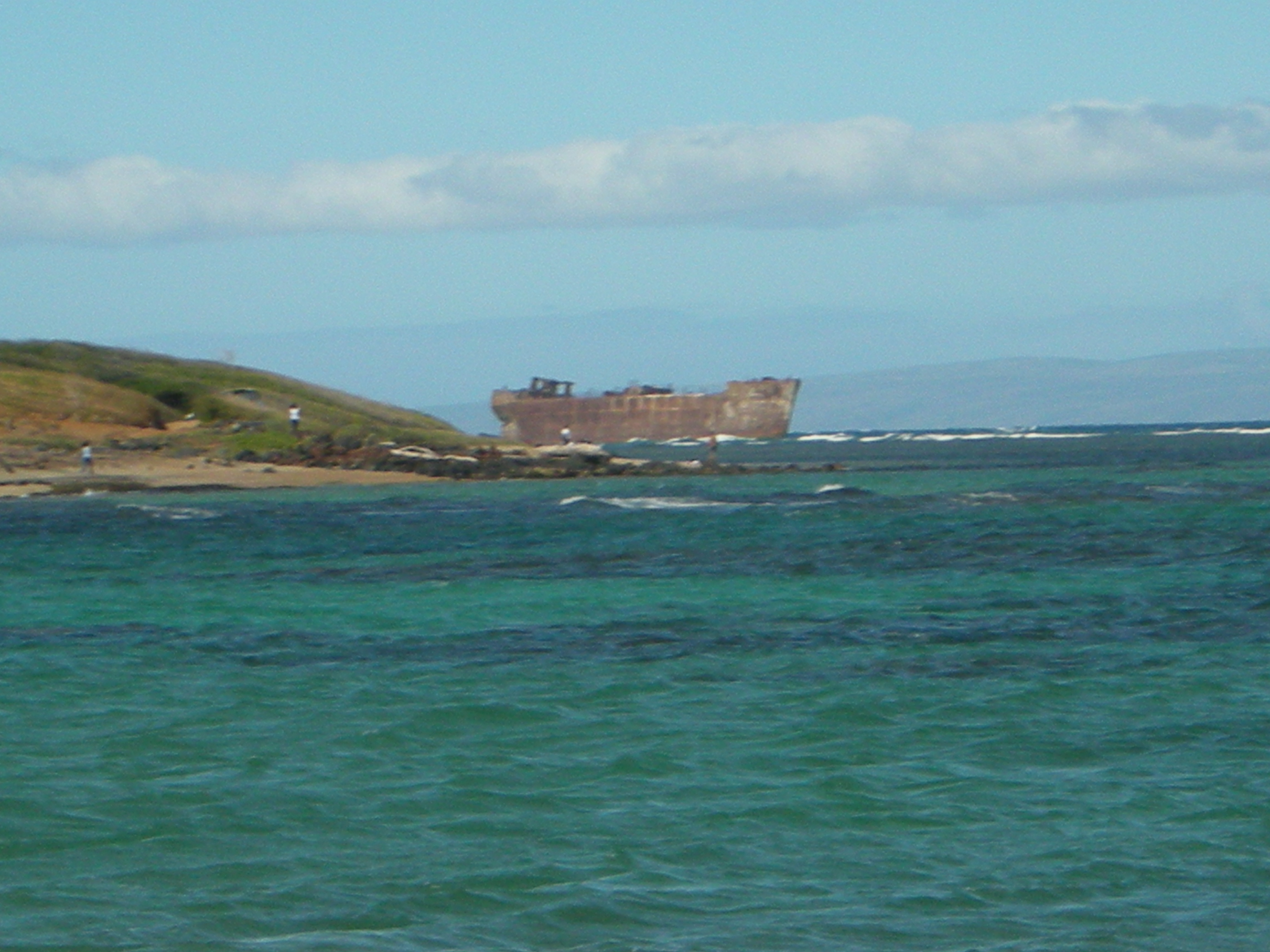
YOGN 42

== See also ==
- Capella (concrete ship)
- Concrete canoe
- Concrete Ship, former concrete hospital ship
- Trefoil-class concrete barge
