= SS Monte Carlo =

American ship that sunk in 1937

Coordinates: 32.674°N 117.173°W

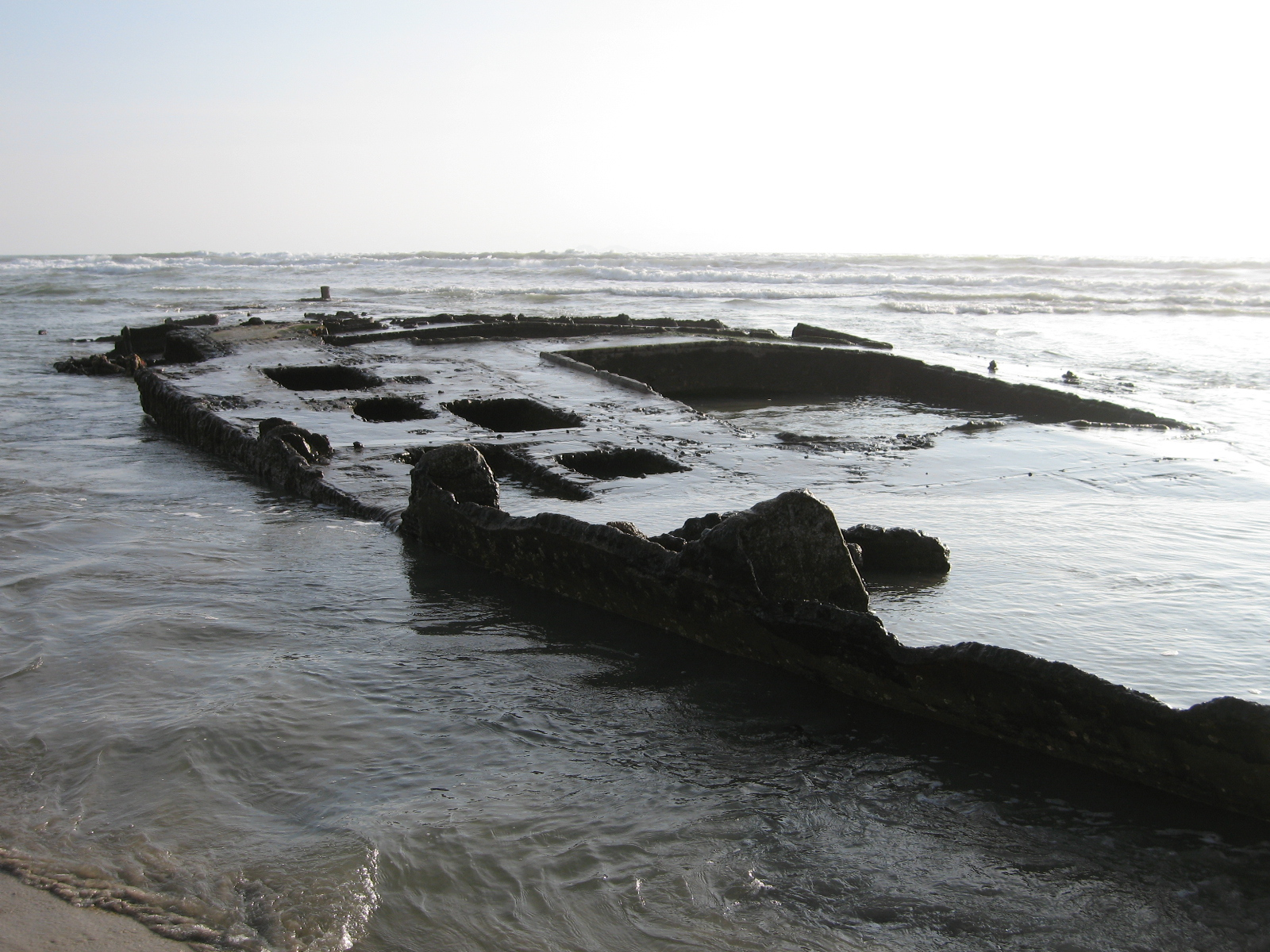
- SS Monte Carlo wreck visible at low tide near Coronado Shores 30 January 2010

History
- Name: Old North State (While under construction); Tanker No. 1 (1921-1923); McKittrick (1923–1932); Monte Carlo (1932–1937)
- Owner: Associated Oil Company (1923–1932)
- Ordered: 1918
- Builder: Liberty Ship Building Company in Wilmington, North Carolina (later the Newport Shipbuilding Company)
- Launched: 1921
- Completed: December 1921
- In service: 1923
- Out of service: 1932
- Identification: US Official number:2223209
- Fate: Wrecked 1937
- Notes: Hull built out of reinforced concrete

General characteristics
- Class & type: Concrete oil tanker based on an incomplete EFC Design 1070 cargo vessel
- Type: Oil tanker
- Length: 300 ft (91 m)
- Beam: 44 ft (13 m)
- Height: 24 ft (7.3 m)
- Propulsion: Single Nordberg triple expansion steam engine
- Notes: Started construction as the EFC Design No. 1070 concrete oil tanker Old North State

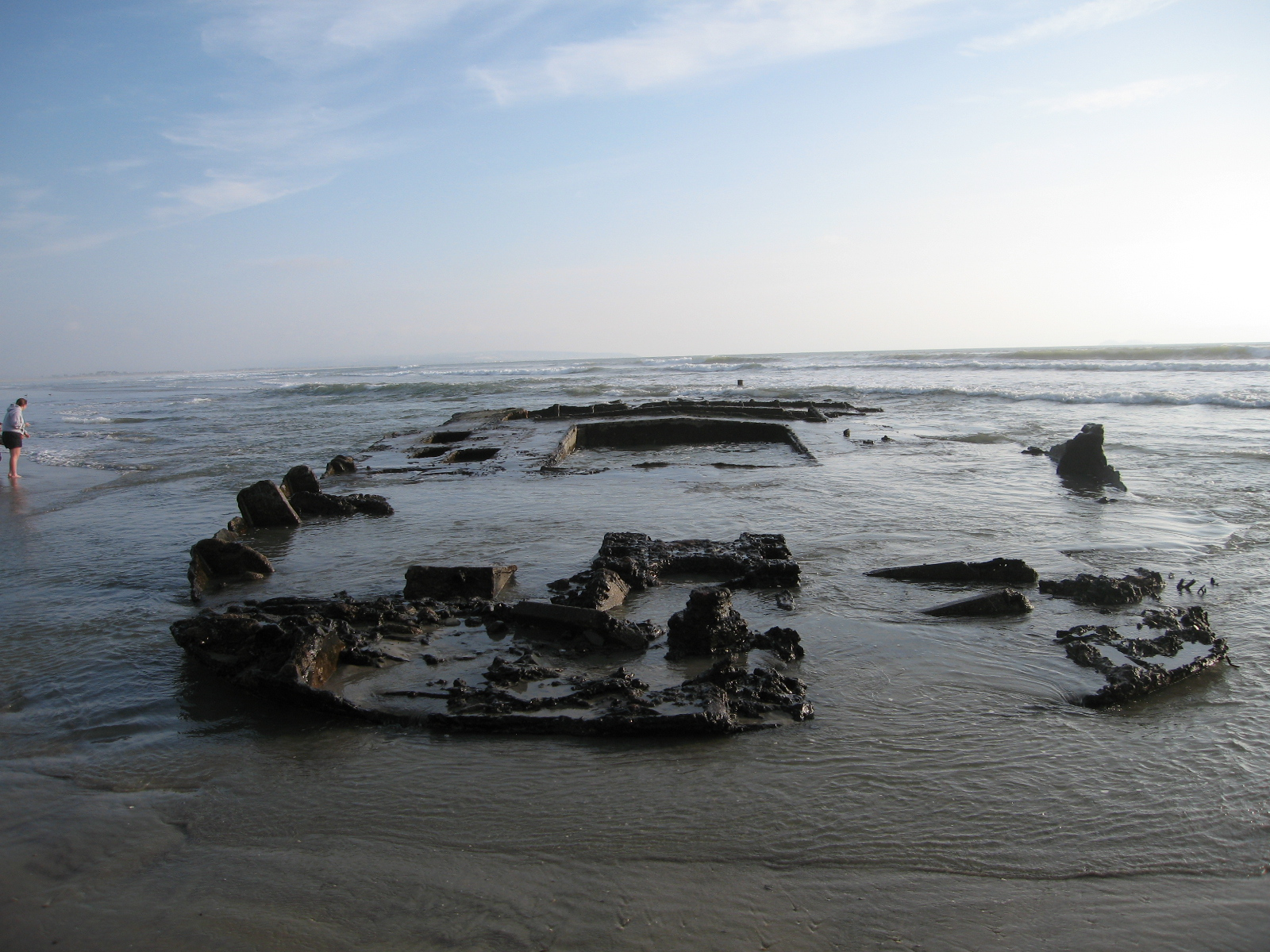
SS Monte Carlo wreck January 30, 2010

SS Monte Carlo was a concrete ship launched in 1921 as the oil tanker SS Old North State. It was later renamed McKittrick. In 1932 it became a gambling and prostitution ship operating in international waters off the coast of Long Beach, California, United States, and was relocated to Coronado, California, in 1936. The Monte Carlo was grounded at Coronado on New Year's Day 1937 during a storm; its wreck remains on the beach.

== History ==
To reduce the use of steel during World War I, on April 12, 1918, President Woodrow Wilson approved the construction of concrete ships, overseen by the Emergency Fleet Corporation (EFC). In total, 24 ships were approved for construction. Only 12 ships were completed by the 1918 armistice. Although the remaining unbuilt ships were cancelled, a 13th and final ship was under construction at the Newport Shipbuilding Company yard in Wilmington, North Carolina. Known as the Old North State this vessel was the third Design No. 1070 class concrete oil tanker constructed, after the previously completed Sapona and Cape Fear. Author Norman Lang McKellar believed construction was completed in 1921 under the temporary name of Tanker No. 1, being heavily modified from its original EFC design. Tanker No. 1 was used by the U.S. Quartermaster Corps until 1923, when the vessel was purchased by the Associated Oil Company of San Francisco and re-purposed as the commercial oil tanker McKittrick. McKittrick was powered by a single Nordberg triple expansion steam engine which was the same unit for other EFC concrete vessels.

In 1932, McKittrick was sold to Ed V. Turner and Marvin Schouweiler and renamed Monte Carlo. Its hull was mostly filled with concrete to reduce motion and the former oil tanker was converted for the purpose of gambling, prostitution and drinking, all of which were illegal during Prohibition. Under the operation of Anthony Cornero, it became the largest gambling ship operating off the California coast. Monte Carlo opened for business off Long Beach on May 7, 1932 coinciding with the 1932 Los Angeles Olympics along with two other gambling ships of the fleet. Monte Carlo was moved to international waters off Coronado Island in 1936. California law enforcement was unable to shut down the ship's operations as it was just beyond their jurisdiction. The water taxis and ferries that carried customers to and from Monte Carlo were subject to high taxation in an attempt to undermine the financial viability of the business.

== Grounding ==
In 1937, Monte Carlo was anchored 3 miles (4.8 km) in international waters off Coronado Beach in San Diego during a storm on New Year's Day when the anchor lost its hold. The ship drifted onto the beach in front of what is now the El Camino Tower of the Coronado Shores condos. Because this vessel was illegal once on shore, no one claimed ownership. The wreckage can be seen underwater at low tide, and is occasionally exposed during strong storm tides. The surrounding beach where it came to rest was coined locally as "Shipwreck Beach" by a Coronado writer and historian in 2005.

It is speculated that there may be $150,000 worth of silver dollar coins remaining in the wreckage. According to the late lifelong resident of Coronado, Edward "Bud" Bernhard who retrieved hundreds of dollars from the shipwreck as a child: "I’m convinced there is $100,000 in gold and silver coins deep in that wreck".

From time to time the wreck becomes visible on the shore of the Silver Strand.

== See also ==
- SS Palo Alto
