= Concrete Ship =

Former German concrete ship

The "Concrete Ship" is a former concrete ship built in Germany in 1943 originally named Sip. It transported goods and was used as a hospital ship transporting wounded troops to land-based treatment facilities. Post-war it was moved to Belgrade and used for housing employees of the Belgrade Excavator Company and their families. Beginning in the 1990s, the ship fell into disrepair. It was finally purchased by Skitrack International, restored and opened to the public as a tourist attraction and a public space in Belgrade, Serbia, in 2016.

== Names ==
The ship was originally named after the Sip Canal, one of the key strategic positions of the German army on the Danube at Djerdap/Iron Gates gorge during the Second World War.

Large and heavy ships have long struggled to move upstream against the fast, strong current of the Danube river. To overcome this, a railroad track was built beside the canal. Trains ran along the track using thick cables to drag ships upstream against the current. As this ship was one of the heaviest in the fleet, it was named Sip.

After the Sip Canal was flooded in 1969 with the construction of the Iron Gate I Hydroelectric Power Station, the ship was renamed Concrete Ship in accordance with ferryman superstition.

== History ==
=== World War II ===
During the Second World War, the global scarcity of raw steel inspired German engineers to design and create concrete ships. They used up to 70% less steel in their construction than traditional steel vessels. The idea of building concrete ships dates back to 1848 in France. Around 100 such ships were constructed in the United States during World War I for similar reasons.

Concrete ships are immune to magnetically triggered naval mines. Adolf Hitler ordered the production of 50 concrete ships to deliver necessary raw materials (such as oil, weaponry, food etc.) through the mine-filled rivers of Nazi Germany.

The Sip was built in 1943 in the second round of production. It was constructed in Ostvind (Swinemunde), by Schalenbau KG, Dyckerhoff & Widmann KG. It was part of a fleet that ensured the continuous flow of oil from Romania to Germany, as well as other necessary raw materials along the entire Danube river.

Additionally, the ship played an important role in the care and transportation of seriously wounded troops to land-based hospitals in Austria and Germany for further treatment. The Sip had multiple specialized areas for hospital functions: ambulance and operating room, wards for the wounded, hospital mess, storerooms for food, water, and medicines, as well as a staff room.

The engines were removed to make room for the steam boiler and the central heating system, by which the entire ship was heated during the winter. The ship was essentially a trailer that needed to be propelled by tugboats or other self-propelled boats that also transported raw materials to German army installations.

=== Post-War ===
Ownership of the Sip was transferred to the Belgrade Excavator Company (BBP) after the end of the Second World War as compensation for their ships destroyed by the Luftwaffe. With the central heating system and the partitioned interior already in place, BBP easily transformed it into a "housing ship" for employees and their families working on the reconstruction of New Belgrade.

The Sip was berthed on the right bank of the Sava river not far from the Gazela Bridge. It remained anchored there for more than three decades.

It had 20 rooms, four shared bathrooms and sanitary facilities, a large lounge, a living room, a room for a janitor, a boiler room and a large terrace on the ship's deck. It was home to parents who worked for BBP and children who grew up and studied in Belgrade. Many generations grew up on this housing ship. When a family left the ship after fulfilling their contract, another family from the interior of Yugoslavia would move in.

=== "Black Days" ===
At the beginning of the 1990s, the breakup of Yugoslavia led to the collapse of many companies, including BBP. The Sip, now called the "Concrete Ship", was left to the workers who maintained it and the local population who secured it until the war years passed.

As the bad wartime situation lingered, the "Concrete Ship", which was still anchored on the right bank of the Sava near the Belgrade Fair, became a place where the homeless and other wanderers found refuge.

On New Year's Eve 2009, due to the irresponsibility of the people guarding it, a storm along the rocky coast caused damage to the "Concrete Ship" and it became partially submerged.

As the years passed, the deterioration of the ship was exacerbated by thieves stripping it for secondary raw materials.

=== "New Birth" ===
After the political upheaval in 2013, and the ambitions of the new Serbian government led by then Prime Minister Aleksandar Vucic, the preparation of the ground for the implementation of the modern Serbian-Arabic project the "Belgrade Waterfront" began.

The private company Dunav Group Aggregates, the legal successor of the privatized Belgrade Excavator Company (BBP), was given a deadline to remove the damaged "Concrete Ship". Due to the very high cost of returning it to seaworthiness, the decision was made to destroy it with mines and clear the coast of its remains.

To preserve a valuable and authentic historical object, Skitrack International from Belgrade stepped in to undertake the risk and obligation to rescue the "Concrete Ship" from complete destruction. They managed to purchased it from Dunav Group Aggregates at the last moment.

The restoration of the "Concrete Ship" took two years. It opened to the public in 2016 as a piece of history, a tourist attraction, and a cultural space.

== See also ==
- Capella, another concrete ship built in the same period.
