= SS Selma (1919) =

Concrete oil tanker vessel

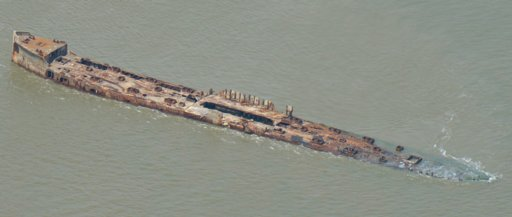
- Wreckage of SS Selma in 2013

History
- Name: SS Selma
- Owner: USSB (1919–March 1922); J. E. Peterson and J. L. Bludworth (March 1922–); Novie Brown (–1992); A. Pat Daniels (1992–2007); A. Pat Daniels - S.S. Selma, Inc. (2007–)
- Operator: American Fuel Oil & Transportation Co. (May 8, 1920–)
- Builder: F.F. Ley and Company, Mobile, Alabama
- Cost: $1,865,950.16 ($34.3 million in 2025)
- Launched: June 28, 1919
- Identification: Hull number 1716; Official number 219771; Code letters LWCB
- Fate: Abandoned in 1922

General characteristics
- Type: Design 1100 concrete tanker
- Tonnage: 6,287 GRT; 3,893 NRT; 7,500 DWT (Note: The designed deadweight. In practice, the DWT was as low as 6,380 DWT.)
- Displacement: 13,040 tons of loaded displacement
- Length: 431.0–434.25 ft (131.37–132.36 m) (o/a); 420.7 ft (128.2 m) (p/p) (Note: The designed length was 420.0 ft (128.0 m).)
- Beam: 54.0 ft (16.5 m)
- Draft: 26.0 ft (7.9 m)
- Depth: 34.4 ft (10.5 m)
- Decks: Two
- Installed power: Three Foster boilers fueled by a bunker of 256,000 US gal (970,000 L; 213,000 imp gal) capacity
- Propulsion: Hooven three-cylinder triple-expansion steam engine; 359 nhp; 2,650 ihp (1,980 kW) (Note: 2,800 ihp (2,100 kW) was the designed figure.)
- Speed: 10.5 knots (19.4 km/h; 12.1 mph)
- Range: 6,500 mi (10,500 km) cruising radius
- Capacity: 3,000,000 US gal (11,000,000 L; 2,500,000 imp gal)
- Crew: 49
- SS Selma (steamship)
- U.S. National Register of Historic Places
- U.S. National Historic Site
- Location within Texas Location within the United States
- Nearest city: Galveston, TX
- Coordinates: 29°20′39″N 94°47′11″W
- Area: 1 acre (0.40 ha)
- NRHP reference No.: 93001449
- Added to NRHP: January 5, 1994

SS Selma was a concrete-hulled oil tanker built as part of the World War I Emergency Fleet, one of only twelve concrete ships that were completed for it. She barely saw service before being wrecked, and was scuttled a few years later. Now, Selma is the only permanent, and prominent, wreck along the Houston Ship Channel. She lies approximately one mile north of Galveston Island.

== Construction and career ==
Steel shortages during World War I led the US to build concrete ships as part of the Shipping Board's Emergency Fleet program. When the armistice was signed, the shipbuilding program was scaled back, leaving only twelve of its planned concrete ships to finish construction. The Selma was constructed by Fred T. Ley & Co. in Mobile, Alabama. Her name was chosen to honor Selma, Alabama, for having the state's largest contribution to the liberty loan drive. The ship was launched sideways at 3 p.m. on June 28, 1919. She was the largest concrete ship in the world at the time of her launch, was the largest of the Shipping Board's concrete ships, and was the sister ship to the SS Latham. She underwent sea trials in February 1920, and was documented on May 6.

On May 8, operated by the American Fuel Oil and Transportation Co, she entered service in the oil trade. However, on May 22, 1920, she struck a jetty in Tampico, Mexico, tearing a 60-foot (18 m) hole in her hull and spilling thousands of barrels of oil. She was refloated and kept in harbor alongside her sister ship, the Latham, which had suffered a similar accident. From August 12–15, she was towed to Galveston, Texas, for intended repairs. She was shuffled between piers for a time until July 13, 1921, when she was struck by another steamer, the Carmarthenshire, which put another hole in her stern. Afterward, she was stripped for parts and her documents were surrendered on February 21, 1922. She was then towed out and placed in a 1,500-foot-long (460 m), 25-foot-wide (7.6 m) channel off Pelican Island and was sunk on March 9. The wreck was sold a few days later to J. E. Peterson and J. L. Bludworth.

Her wreck was used for storage and disposal of bootleg liquor during the Prohibition era, as an explosives storage site in 1926, and as a staging area for an oil exploration company in 1928. Testing of her concrete in the 1950s and 1980s revealed that it became stronger over time, (Note: About half again as strong as it had been while she was afloat.) peaking in about 1975, and that it showed little signs of corrosion.

A. Pat Daniels, a Texas journalist, historian, and author, purchased the ship in 1992 from Novie Brown (Hargett) after discovering that she was privately owned. Through his efforts, the SS Selma was designated a Texas State Archeological Landmark in 1993, was listed on the National Register of Historic Places in 1994, was recognized with a Texas Historical Commission marker located on nearby Pelican Island, and was named the official flagship of the Texas Army. After Daniels died in 2011, control of the corporation was transferred to his friends William and Edna Cox, who had helped Daniels incorporate the ship as protection from a potential liability lawsuit. On their passing, control of the company went to their son, Ken Cox.

== Gallery ==
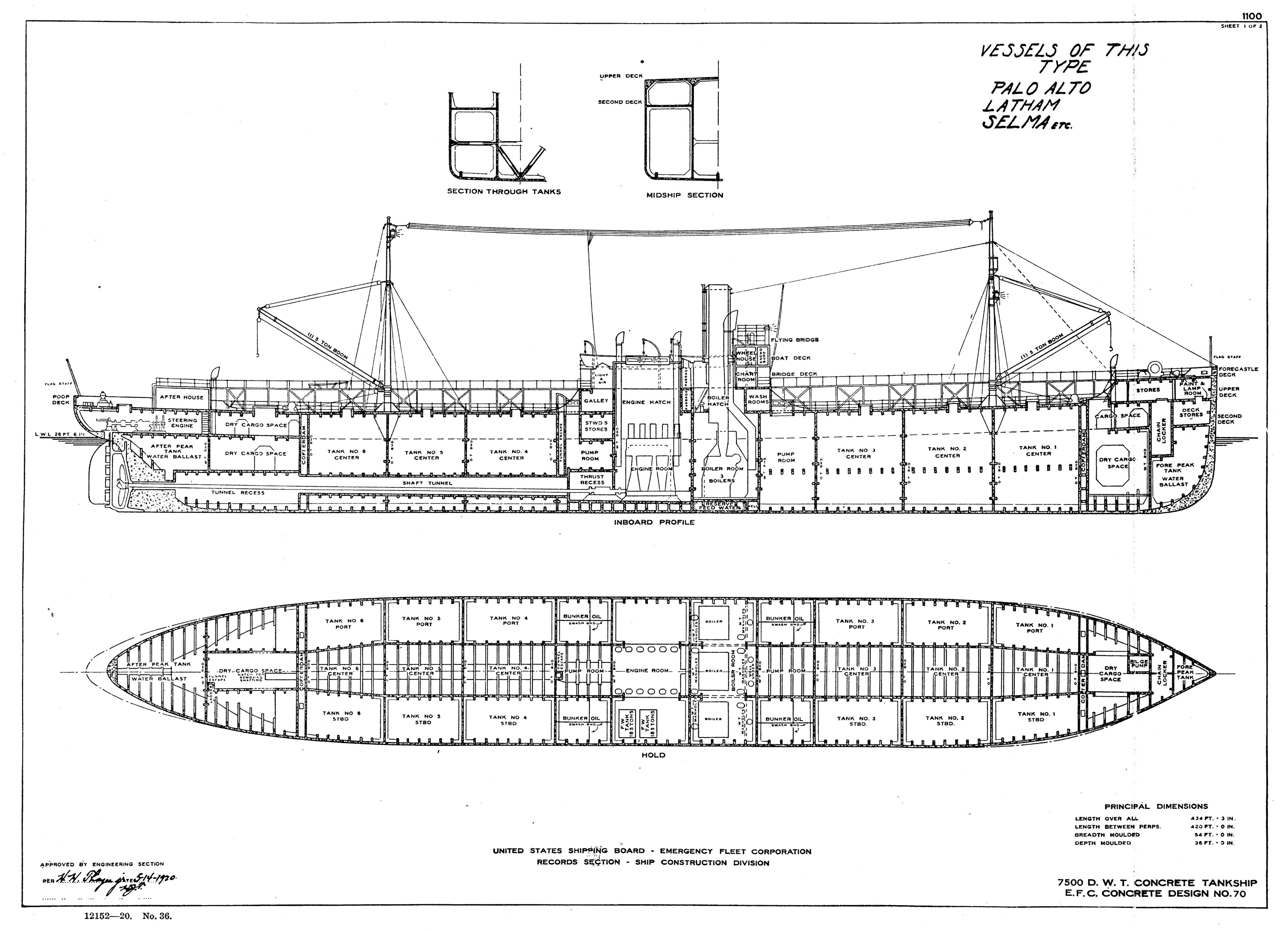
Design 1100 inboard profile and hold plans

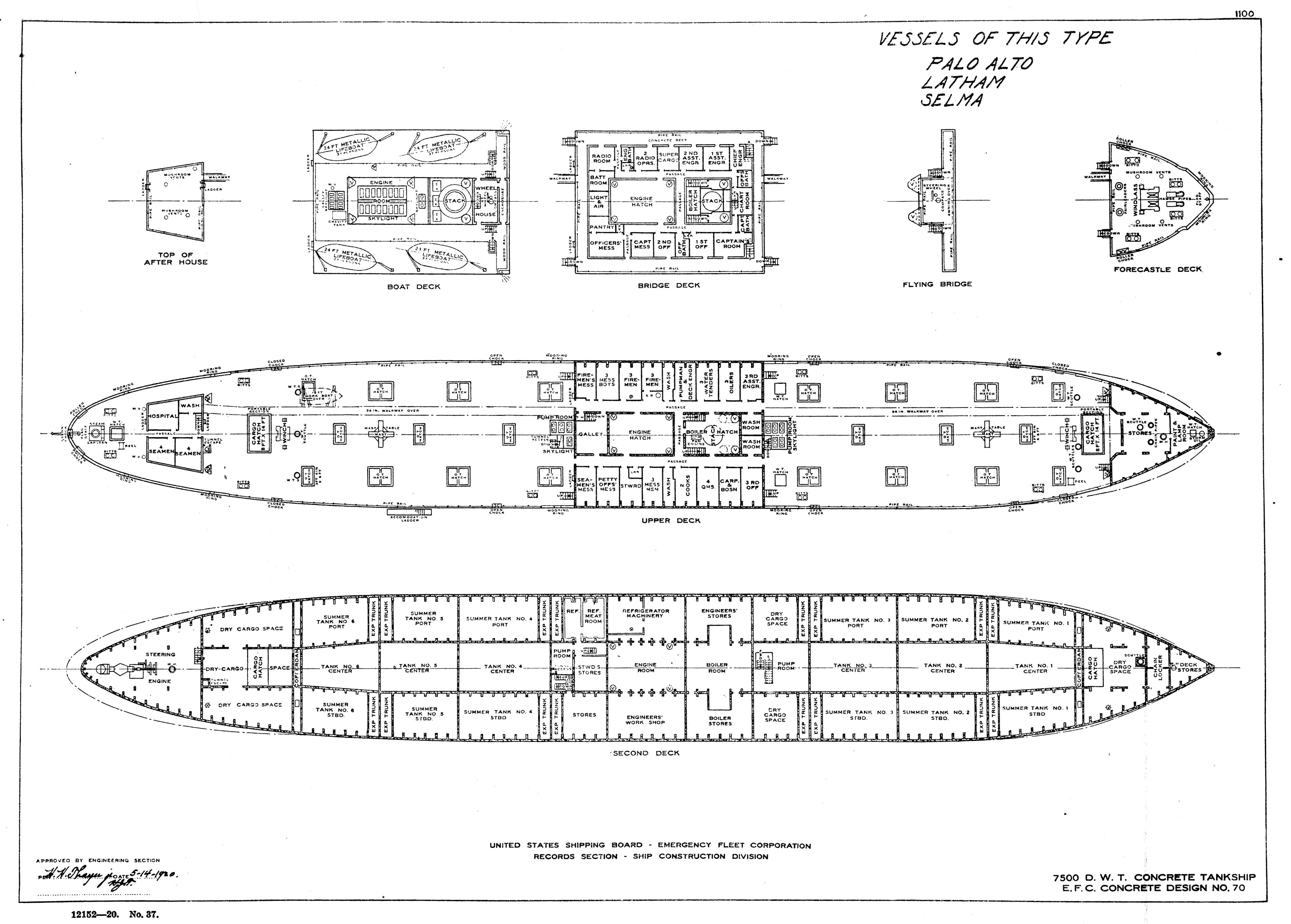
Design 1100 deck plans

== See also ==
- National Register of Historic Places listings in Galveston County, Texas
