= William Leslie Comyn =

American businessman and shipbuilder

William Leslie Comyn (born 30 October 1877) was an American businessman, shipbuilder and builder of one of the first large concrete ships.

== Life ==
Comyn was the second son of Charles Comyn an English civil servant and was born at Shepherd's Bush, London. His great-uncle Stephen George Comyn had been naval chaplain to the English Admiral Lord Nelson. He was educated at Merchant Taylor's School, and Dulwich College and subsequently founded his own shipping company - Comyn Singleton and Dunn of Gracechurch Street London EC1. Through this business he went to California where he settled and became a businessman in San Francisco. His father in law William Emil Gerber of Sacramento, California was a merchant and financier, and may have supported his enterprises. One of the ships he built was a five master sailing ship named Ann Comyn after his wife.

During World War I Leslie Comyn, tried to persuade the United States Shipping Board (USSB) that they should build concrete ships. They were not convinced so in 1917, he founded the San Francisco Shipbuilding Company at Oakland, California. In January 1918 he started, on speculation, to build the first ship, called appropriately "FAITH" designed by Alan MacDonald and Victor Poss. The ship was an 8000-ton freighter, and, at the time, the largest concrete vessel with a sea-going capability in the world. The ship was launched successfully in March 1918. Following this, on April 12, 1918, President Woodrow Wilson approved the Emergency Fleet Corporation program which oversaw the construction of 24 ferrocement ships for the war.

In May 1918, the SS Faith left San Francisco on her maiden voyage, with 4300 tons of salt and copper ore, bound for Vancouver, followed by other voyages to Honolulu, Balboa, Callao, Valparaiso and New York. In 1919 Comyn's shipbuilding company sold the ship to the French-American SS Lines.

Comyn was founder President of the "W L Comyn & Co" shipping company and had an interest in other companies (for example Snow's Import Export). The company is widely quoted in shipping law from the case "Dampskibsselskabet Dannebrog V. Signal Oil & Gas Co. of, 310 U.S. 268 (1940)". The question concerned is whether the Standard Oil were entitled to maritime liens for fuel oil delivered to Dannebrog's vessels. Dannebrog had chartered two ships - the 'Stjerneborg' and the 'Brand' - to W. L. Comyn & Sons in May 1933. Standard Oil had previously modified a contract with Anglo Canadian Shipping to include the fuel oil requirements of vessels owned, chartered or operated by W. L. Comyn & Sons.

== Family ==
Comyn married Ann Gerber, daughter of William Gerber, and had three children. His brother Hugh Comyn was a Wimbledon singles entrant in 1906 and 1907 as well as a Scottish Open (badminton) champion in 1908 and 1909. His sister Cicely Vaughan Wilkes, with her husband, founded and ran the influential St Cyprian's School in Eastbourne, England.
