= SS Faith =

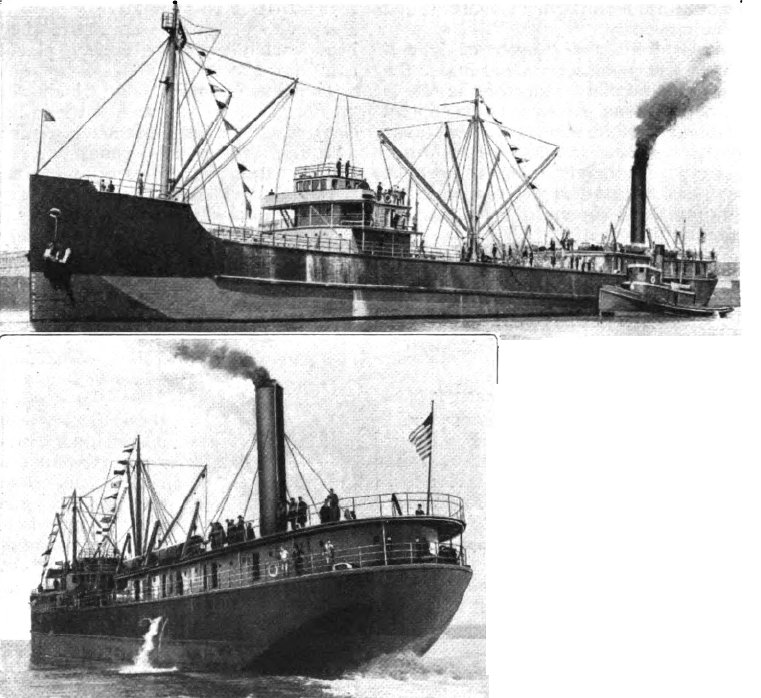
- The Faith shortly after launch

History
- Name: Faith
- Owner: William Leslie Comyn
- Ordered: December 1917
- Builder: San Francisco Shipbuilding Company, Redwood City, California
- Cost: US$750,000
- Launched: 14 March 1918
- Sponsored by: Mrs. Leslie Comyn, wife of the president of the builders
- Christened: 14 March 1918
- In service: 1918
- Out of service: 1921
- Fate: Broken up 1926

General characteristics
- Class & type: Concrete ship
- Tonnage: 8,000 tons
- Length: 336 ft 6 in (102.57 m)
- Beam: 22 ft 6 in (6.86 m)
- Height: 44 ft 6 in (13.56 m)
- Installed power: 1,760 hp (1,310 kW)
- Propulsion: 2 triple expansion steam engines
- Speed: 10 kn (19 km/h; 12 mph)
- Notes: First concrete ship of the United States

SS Faith was the first concrete ship built in the United States. It was constructed by the San Francisco Shipbuilding Company in 1918 owned by William Leslie Comyn. It cost $750,000.

== The construction ==
Work began September 1, 1917; concrete pouring began October 31, 1917 and ended February 26, 1918. The steamship (SS) Faith was launched on March 14, 1918, from Redwood City, California. The ship was designed by Alan Macdonald and Victor Poss. It pulled up to 5,000 tons, being the largest concrete ship of its time. The cost of the hull itself was estimated at US$450,000, and the early estimate before completion was that it would total US$890,000 overall.

=== Dimensions ===
- 102,56 x 13,56 x 6,86 metres 336.5 x 44.5 x 22.5 feet
- 6125 tons
- 2 triple expansion steam machines
- 1760 Horsepower
- 10 knots

== History ==
"[...] said William Leslie Comyn [...] he likewise pointed out the lack of steel-making plants and shipyards on the West Coast. His solution: build ships of concrete. [...] He was convinced that a 5,000-ton concrete freighter could be operated at a profit and on 3 September 1917 he solicited contractual support from USSB to build "five reinforced concrete steamers" [...] On speculation, then, his firm began to build the Faith at Redwood City, California"

The first journeys were to Honolulu, Balboa, Callao, Valparaíso and New York. In 1919, the San Francisco Shipbuilding company was sold to French American SS lines, and in 1921, Faith was used as a breakwater in Cuba. She was broken up in 1926. Or by August of 1921 she was effectively laid up in New Orleans, where she was put up for sale in order to pay the crew’s wages. There were no buyers interested in her as a working ship, and she was ‘sold for a song’ in December 1921, to be dismantled. Having been stripped of all machinery, equipment and fittings, she was left on the river for a decade. In 1932, her hulk was towed to Mexico where she was scuttled as embankment in the Grijalva River.
