= Stephen George Comyn =

English naval chaplain

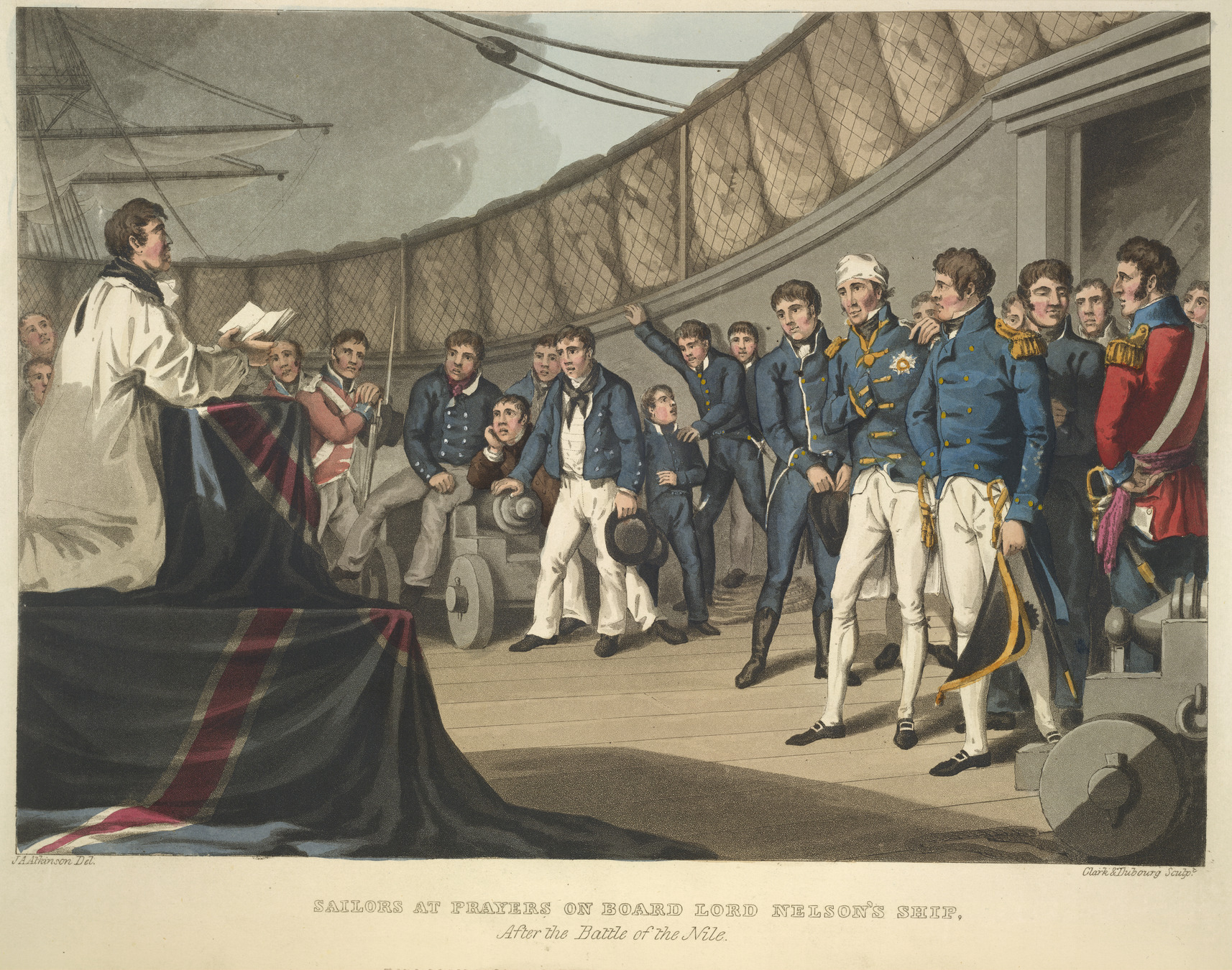
Comyn conducting a prayer service on HMS Vanguard on 2 August 1798

Stephen George Comyn (29 December 1764 – 3 March 1839) was an English naval chaplain who served with Lord Nelson at the Battle of the Nile and Battle of Copenhagen. He was a close friend of Nelson and is said to have been his favourite chaplain.

== Early life ==
Comyn was the eldest son of Stephen Comyn a merchant of London and his wife Mary Wilsonn. He attended Westminster School and Trinity College, Cambridge. He took Holy Orders, and became a naval chaplain in 1798 and was posted to HMS Vanguard.

== Naval service ==
Comyn was thus Nelson's Chaplain at the time of the Battle of the Nile. At the battle the injured Nelson believed he was dying and sent for Comyn. Nelson recovered and following the victory, issued a memorandum to his fleet, "Almighty God having blessed His Majesty's arms with victory, the Admiral intends returning public thanksgiving for the same at 2 o'clock this day and he recommends every ship doing the same as soon as convenient." Reverend Comyn conducted the service from the quarterdeck of the Vanguard, which made a great impression on a group of captured French officers.

After the battle the Vanguard headed for Palermo in Italy, where Nelson encountered Emma Hamilton and the crew languished there inactive for several months. On 5 June 1799, Nelson shifted his flag to HMS Foudroyant, with Captain Hardy and five lieutenants, and Comyn accompanied them until 1800. Comyn was on the captured Guillaume Tell until he transferred to HMS San Josef on 24 December 1800.

In Spring 1801 the British Fleet was in the Baltic for the attack on the Danes at Copenhagen where Comyn was chaplain on Nelson's ship, HMS St George. Nelson transferred to HMS Elephant for the battle, but it is not known if Comyn accompanied him.

== Land service ==
As he was reaching the end of his service with the Navy, Comyn approached Nelson with a request for a living ashore and he became Vicar of Bridgham Norfolk in 1802 and later of Brunstead Norfolk . A letter from Nelson to him dated 24 June 1801 congratulated him on his appointment and ended in a postscript in Emma Hamilton's handwriting Joy joy to you & Mrs Comyn my dear sir.

Comyn married Charlotte Carter of Rochester, Kent and their second son, born in 1806 was called Horatio Nelson William Comyn. Comyn died at Brunstead and was buried in the north-east corner of the chancel'. Comyn's brother Henry Comyn was also a clergyman and as curate of Boldre, Hampshire, is noted for conducting a very early census of the New Forest. His great nephew William Leslie Comyn was a pioneer builder of concrete ships in California during the First World War.

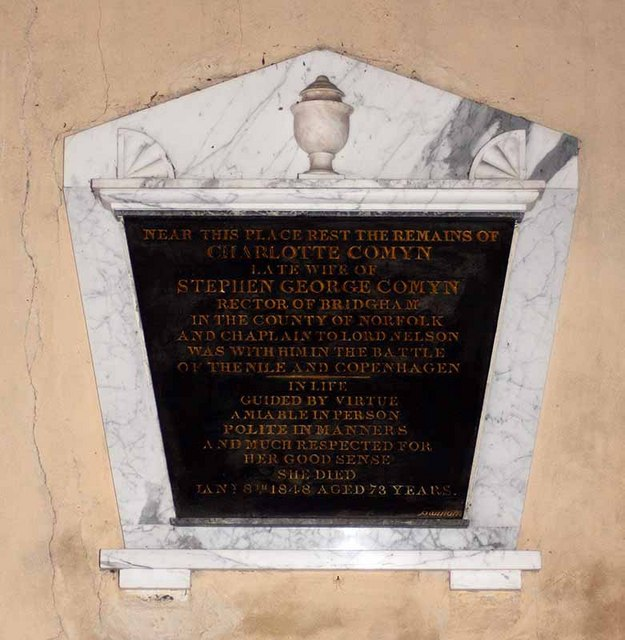
Stephen George Comyn memorial plaque, St Peter's, Brunstead.
