= SS Sapona =

Shipwreck near Bimini, Bahamas

Coordinates: 25°39.040′N 79°17.593′W

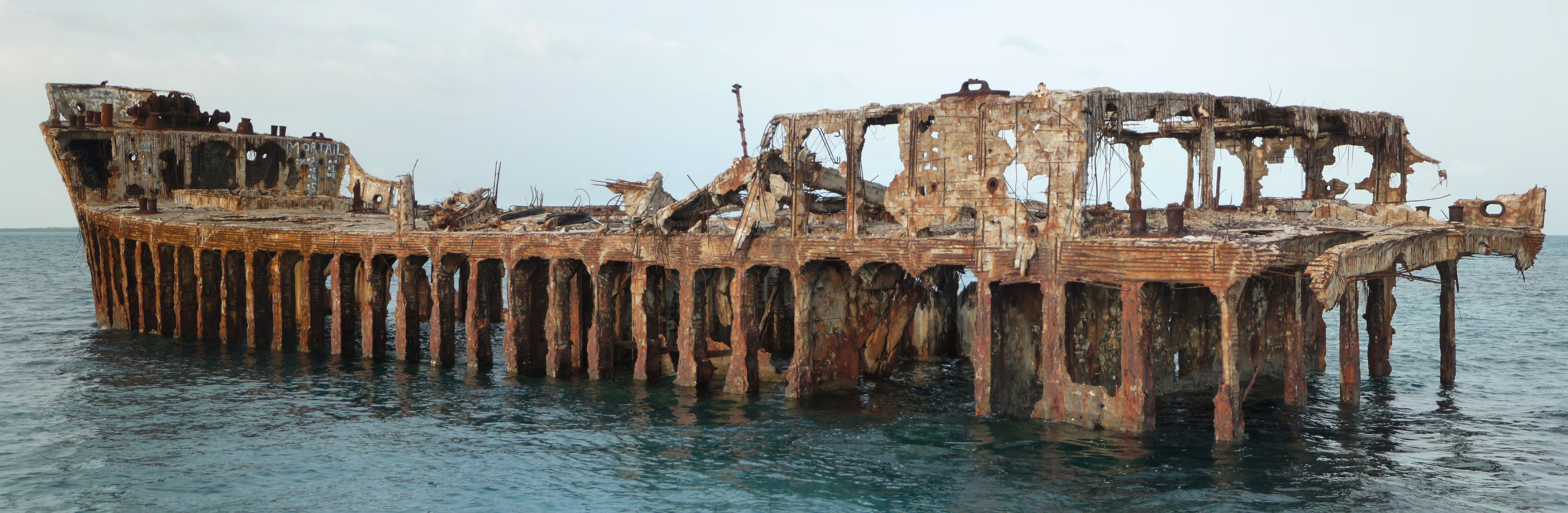
- Sapona's port side, August 2009

History
- Owner: USSB (1919–1924); Carl G. Fisher (1924–); Bruce Bethel (–1926)
- Operator: Clyde Steamship Company (1920); Standard Steamship Company (1920); Carl G. Fisher (1924–); Bruce Bethel (–1926)
- Builder: Liberty Shipbuilding Company
- Cost: $1,127,705.81 ($21.2 million in 2025)
- Launched: October 11, 1919
- Completed: January 14, 1920
- Home port: Wilmington, NC
- Identification: Hull number 1562; Official number 219402; Code letters LVDC
- Fate: Grounded 1926

General characteristics
- Type: Design 1070 cargo ship
- Tonnage: 3,500 DWT (Note: The designed deadweight. In practice, the figure was as low as 3,078 DWT.); 2,795 GRT; 1,693 NRT
- Displacement: 6,310 tons of loaded displacement
- Length: 281 ft 10 in (85.90 m) (o/a); 268 ft (82 m) (p/p); 86 m (282 ft)
- Beam: 46 ft (14 m)
- Draft: 23 ft 6 in (7.16 m)
- Depth: 28 ft 3 in (8.61 m)
- Decks: One
- Installed power: Coal-fired boiler
- Propulsion: Worthington three-cylinder triple-expansion steam engine; 188 nhp; 1,400 ihp (1,000 kW)
- Speed: 10.5 knots (19.4 km/h; 12.1 mph)
- Crew: 48

SS Sapona was a concrete-hulled cargo steamer originally created as part of the World War I Emergency Fleet. As with the other twelve concrete ships that finished construction for the Shipping Board, she was finished too late for wartime service. She briefly hauled cargo for a time before being moved to Miami to serve as storage. She was later moved to Bimini, where her wreck continues to serve as an artificial reef and as a popular dive site.

== History ==
Under the auspices of the United States Shipping Board, the Sapona was built by the Liberty Shipbuilding Company in Wilmington, North Carolina, and outfitted by the Jacksonville Ship Outfitting Company. After the armistice brought an end to the shipbuilding program, any ship that wasn't far along in construction was canceled, leaving the ship as one of only twelve concrete ships that would continue construction. She was launched October 11, 1919, under the name Old North State, and was renamed Sapona by the end of the year. The Sapona received her documents on January 8, 1920, and was delivered on January 14, 1920, at a final cost of $1,127,705.81 ($21.2 million in 2025).

She was operated as a cargo ship for a time by the Clyde Steamship Company and the Standard Steamship Company, primarily in the New England coal trade. On September 2, 1920, she was sent to be laid up at Claremont, Virginia. The Sapona was subsequently sold to Miami Beach developer Carl G. Fisher for $4,000 ($75,146 in 2025), who obtained her documents February 29, 1924. Once the Sapona was moved to Ajax Reef near Miami, her machinery was traded to the Clark Dredging Company in exchange for their services. Without engines, and with the intention of using her for fixed service (a fisherman's club and oil storage), she was considered dismantled and her documents were surrendered April 19, 1924.

As the hulk's condition deteriorated, she was considered an eyesore and was ordered sunk by Fisher, but was instead sold off to Bruce Bethel, a former British soldier running a bar in the Bahamas. The Sapona was towed to Bimini, where it was intended that she be used to store liquor for use in Florida rum-running. She was driven aground at Barnett Harbor during a hurricane in 1926, breaking her stern. Salvaging her was considered too expensive, and she was abandoned.

She was later used for bombing practice during World War II.

Since her grounding, she has served as an artificial reef and has become a popular fishing, snorkeling, and diving site because of the shallow water she lies in (15–20 ft (5–6 m)) and the numerous tropical fish near her.

== In popular culture ==
The ship was used as a backdrop in the 1977 horror film Shock Waves.

== Gallery ==
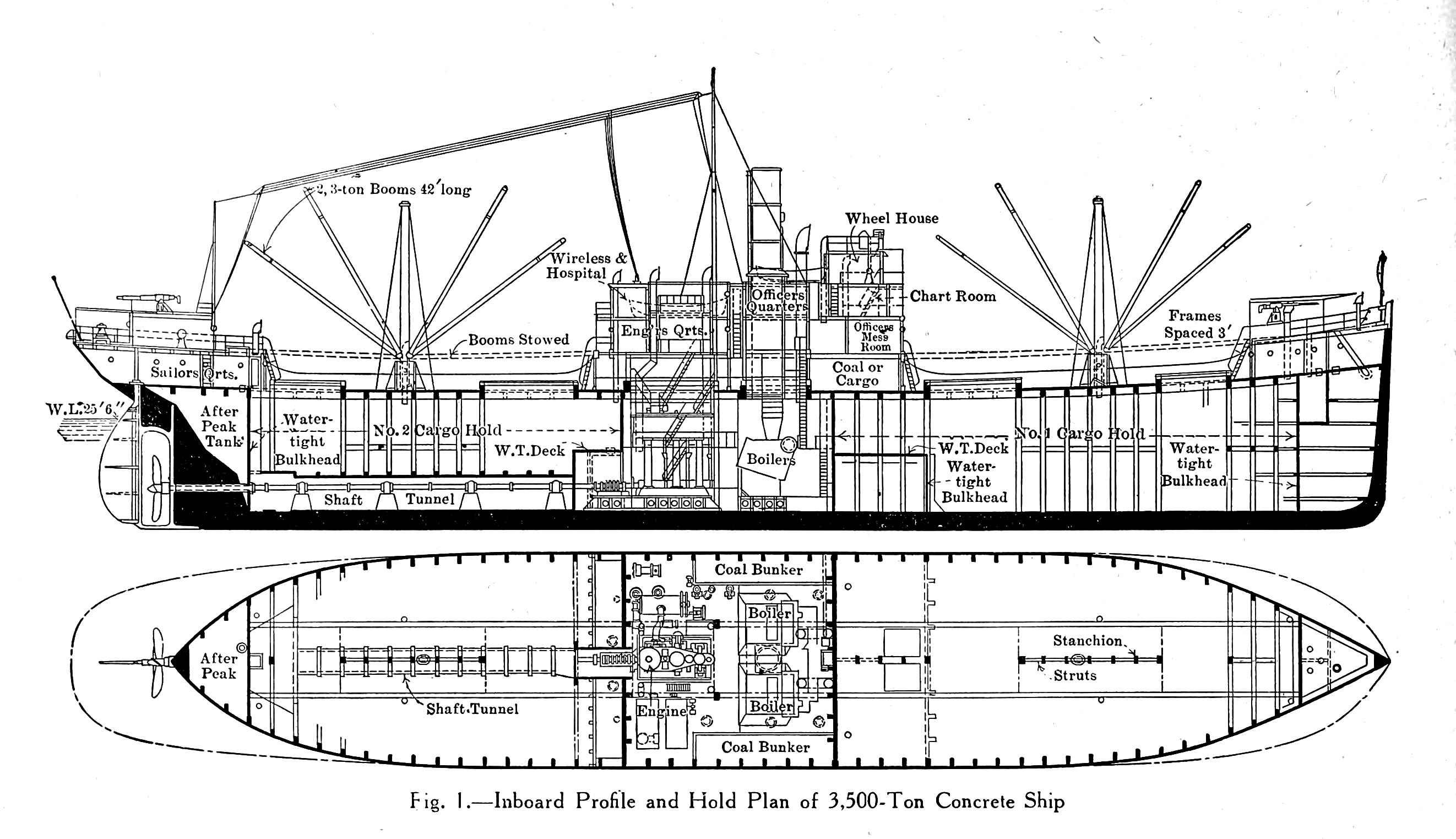
Design 1070 inboard profile and deck plan

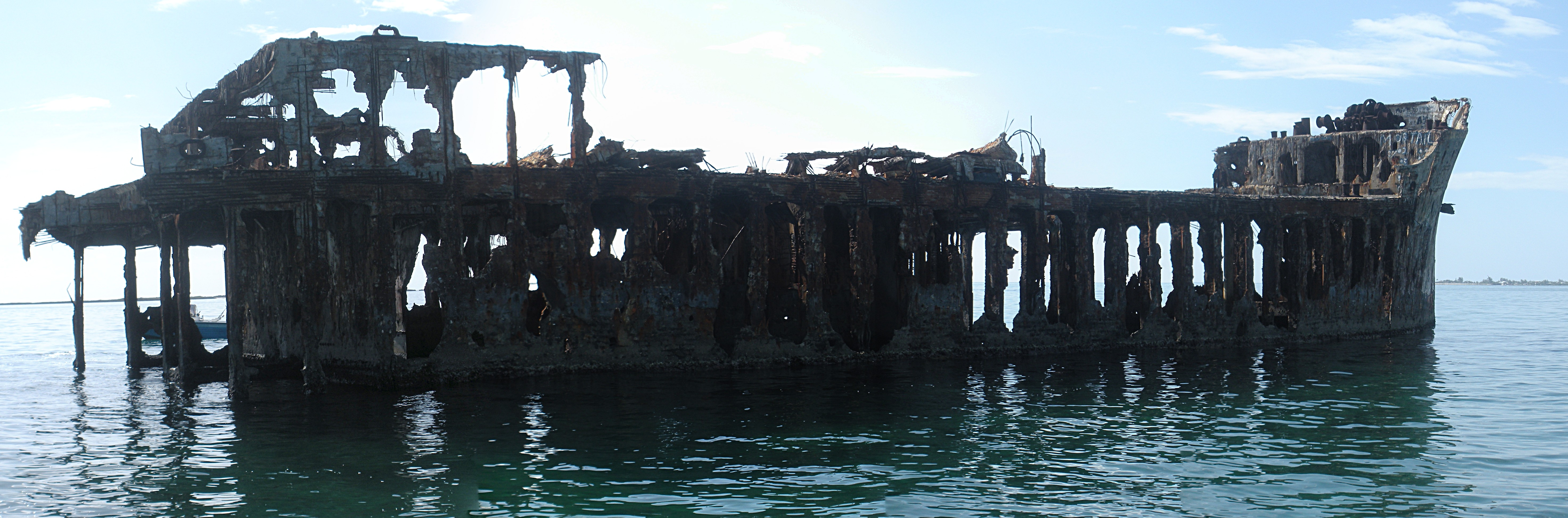
Sapona, starboard side, June 2010

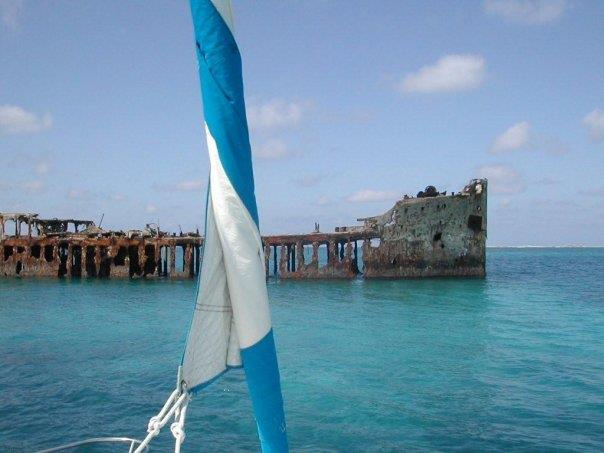
SS Sapona, February 2010
