= YOG–42 =

Concrete gasoline barge

Coordinates: 20°55′16.4706″N 156°54′36.3492″W

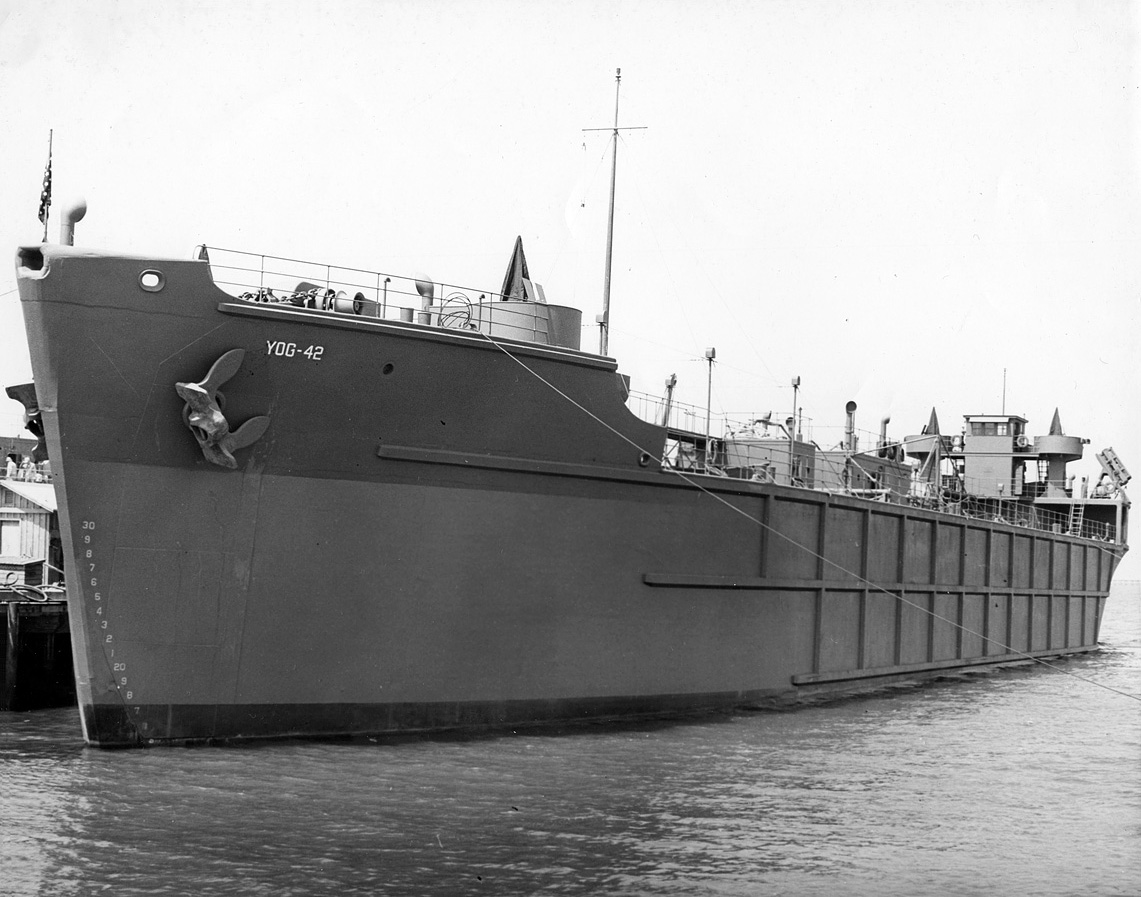
- USS YOG-42 in May 1943

History
- Owner: United States Navy
- Operator: United States Navy
- Builder: Concrete Ship Constructors, National City, California
- Yard number: 5
- Laid down: 6 December 1942
- Launched: 23 March 1943
- Acquired: 23 May 1943
- Out of service: 1949
- Identification: YOG-42, YOGN-42
- Fate: Beached on Lānaʻi, Hawaiian Islands, 1949–1950

General characteristics
- Class & type: Non-self-propelled Maritime Commission type (B7-A2) barge hull (MC 638)
- Type: Tanker
- Displacement: 5,410 t.(lt) 6,600 t.(fl)
- Length: 375 feet (114 m)
- Beam: 56 feet (17 m)
- Draft: 26.6 feet (8.1 m)
- Propulsion: None
- Crew: Approximately 22
- Notes: Armament four Oerlikon 20 mm cannon as built

USS YOG-42 was a concrete-hull gasoline barge built by Concrete Ship Constructors, in National City, California. She was launched on 23 March 1943. Acquired by the United States Navy on 23 May 1943. She was assigned to the Asiatic-Pacific Theater, and survived the war. Re-designated YOGN-42 in May 1946, she was struck from the Naval Register on 15 August 1949. Some time the next year, she was intentionally beached on the north coast of Lānaʻi in the Hawaiian Islands.

== Construction ==
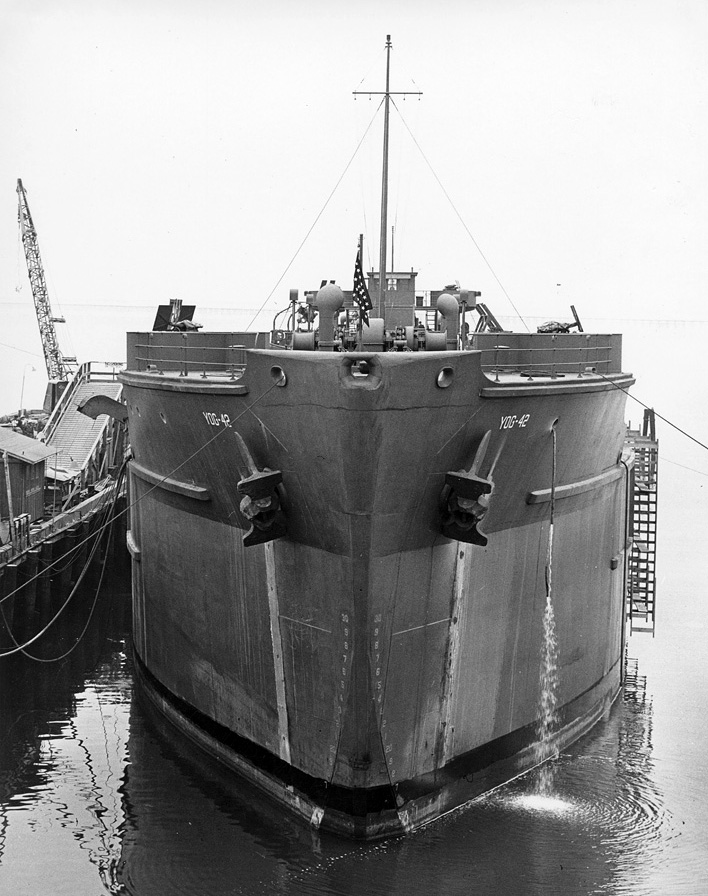
USS YOG-42 in May 1943. The deep draft seen here is for gasoline stowage.

USS YOG-42 was built by Concrete Ship Constructors, in National City, California as Concrete No. 5 a non-self-propelled, Maritime Commission, type B7-A2, barge- hull (MC 638). She was laid down on 6 December 1942, and launched on 23 March 1943. Acquired by the United States Navy on 23 May 1943, USS YOG-42 was assigned to the Asiatic-Pacific Theater.

== Service in World War II ==
While towing YOG-42, the tug USS Navajo (AT-64) was sunk by Japanese submarine I-39, 150 miles (240 km) east of Espiritu Santo on 12 September 1943. YOG-42 was undamaged and was recovered by USS Sioux (AT-75). On 31 December 1943, USS Dixie (AD-14) reported 22 men assigned to YOG-42. YOG-42 survived the Pacific War and continued to supply gasoline throughout the conflict.

== Shipwreck ==
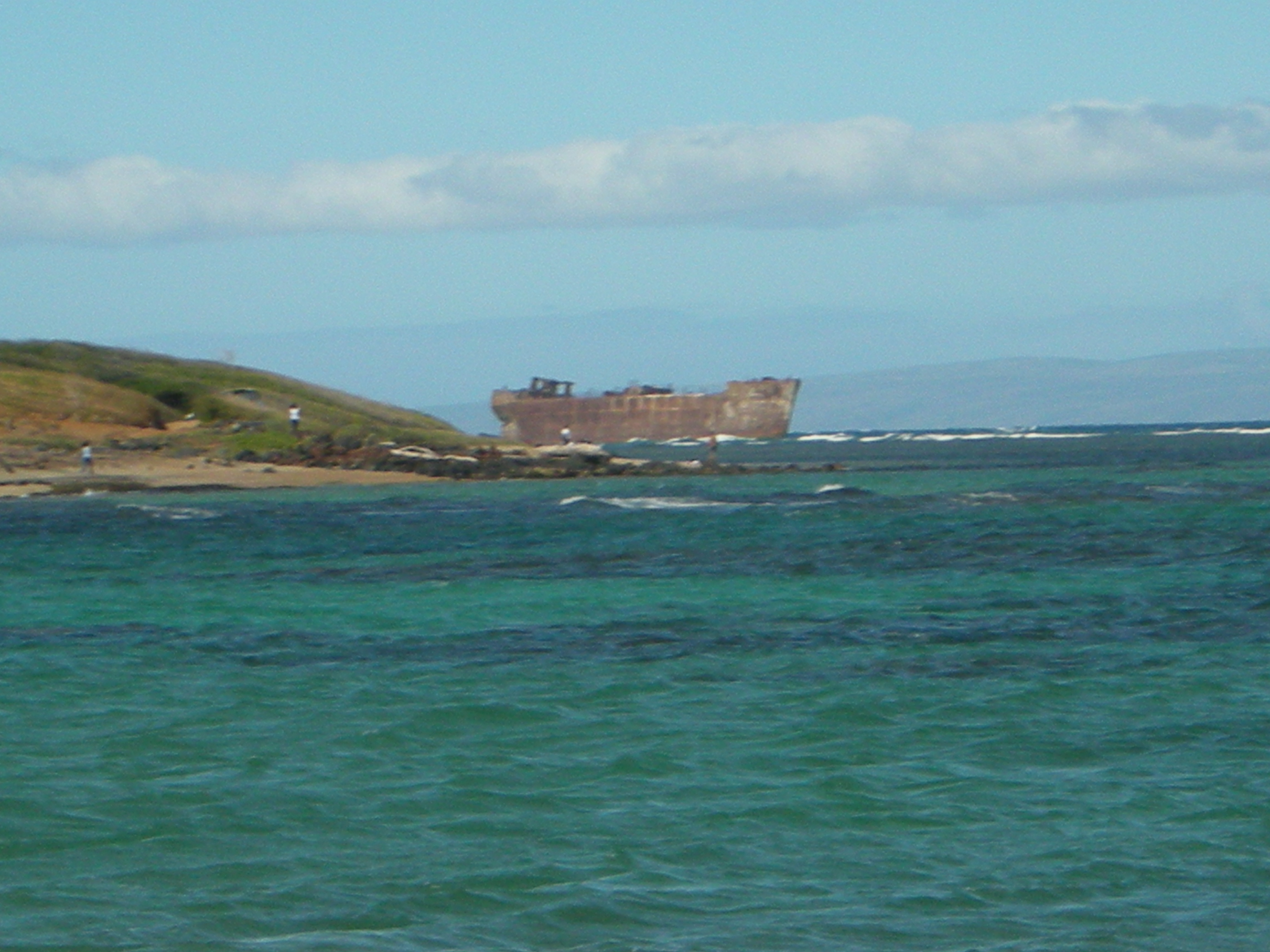
USS YOGN-42 in 2006, wrecked on Lānaʻi Beach

Re-designated YOGN-42 in May 1946, she was struck from the Naval Register on 15 August 1949. Some time the next year, she was intentionally beached on the north coast of Lānaʻi in the Hawaiian Islands, where she can be seen to this day. The United States Navy has recommended the wreck of YOGN-42 for protected status in the National Register of Historic Places for cultural preservation as a Lānaʻi tourist attraction.
