= Capella (concrete ship) =

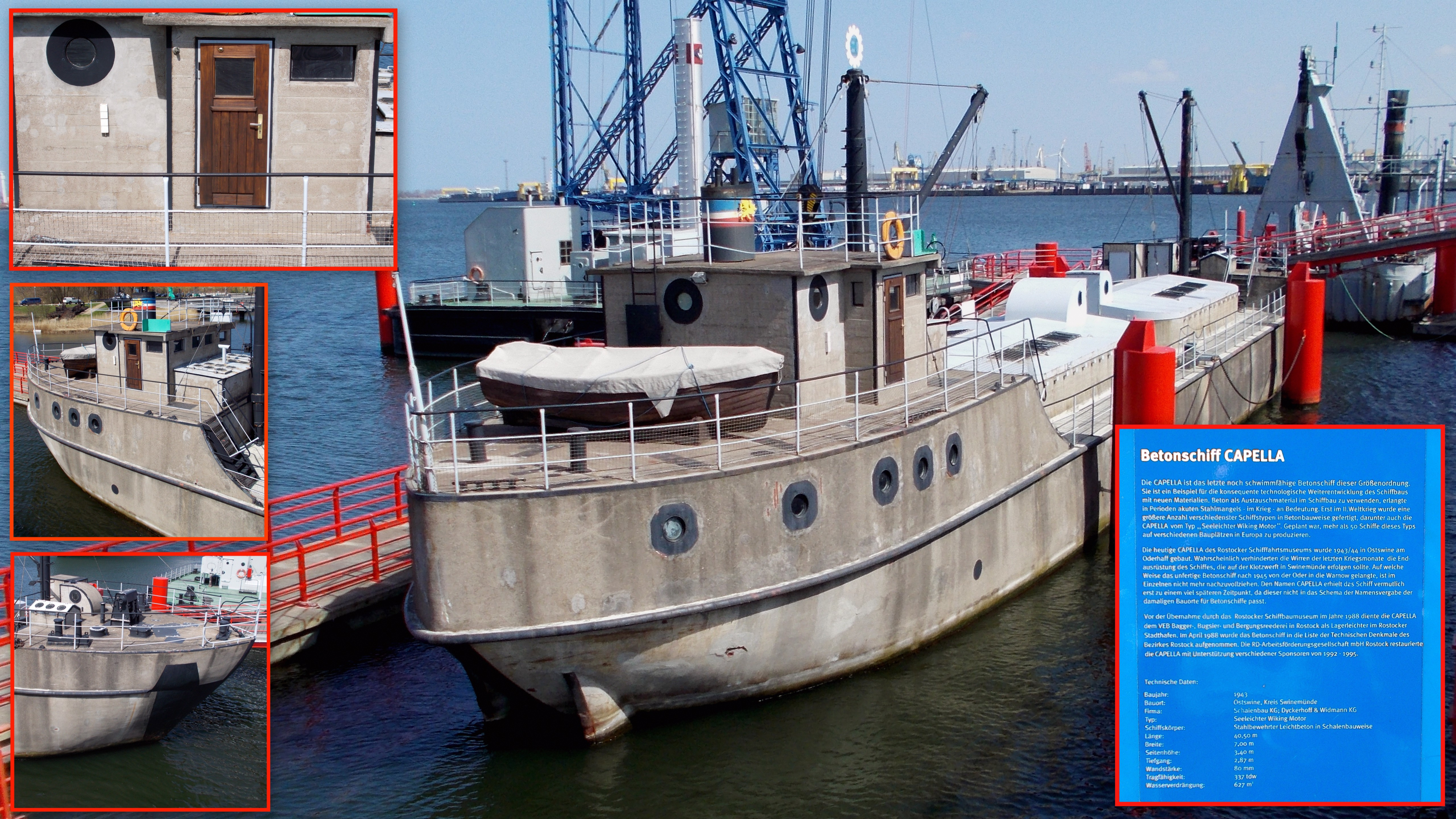
Betonschiff Capella in Rostock

Capella is a concrete ship constructed in 1943 at Ostvinda (Swinemunde), by the manufacturer Schalenbau KG, Dyckerhoff & Widmann KG.

== Overview ==
This ship was not completed during the Second World War, but after its completion, it served mainly as a digger of dredging currents and as a tugboat to other ships. In 1988, it was proclaimed a German technical monument, and in 2003, she earned a position at the Maritime Ship Museum, on the Warnow River in Rostock, 250 km north of Berlin.
