= Gambling ship =

Ship stationed or traveling offshore to evade gambling laws

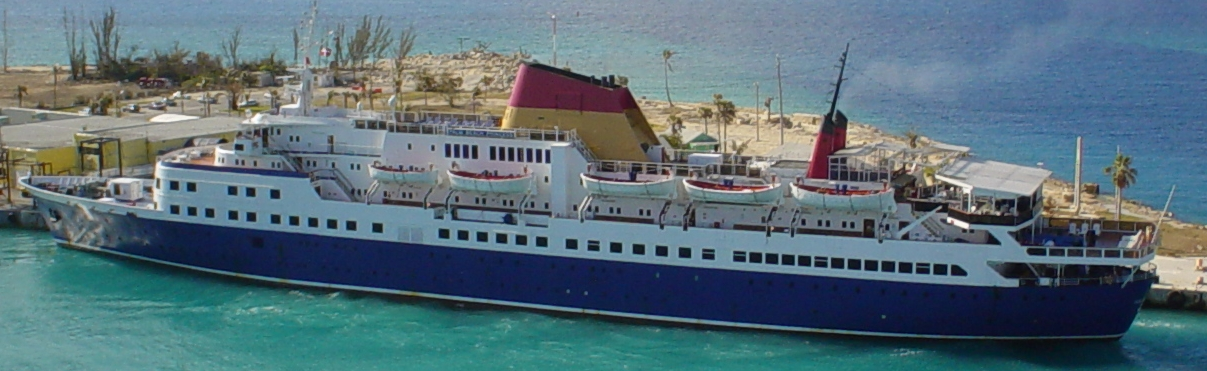
Palm Beach Princess at Freeport in the Bahamas in 2006

A gambling ship is a ship stationed offshore in or transiting to international waters to evade local anti-gambling laws that is dedicated to games of chance. This applies both to ships which are permanently moored somewhere outside the limits, or, when legal, that can transit back and forth from a nearby port where it is not. Other ships also offer gambling as part of their onboard entertainment, but are not "gambling ships" per se.

Historically, international waters began just 3 miles (4.8 km) from land in many countries, popularly referred to as the "three-mile limit". Gambling ships, like offshore radio stations, would usually be anchored just beyond it. The redefinition of territorial waters to 12 nautical miles—approximately 13.8 miles (22.2 km)— in 1982 made maintaining a gambling ship much more uneconomic.

In the United States, in addition to federal law, state statutes regulate the legality of gambling ships in their waters.

== In California ==
The barge Monfalcone was purchased in 1928 by a group including Los Angeles crime family boss Jack Dragna and started offering gambling off the coast of Long Beach. The ship sank in 1930 after a fire. Also in 1928, the lumber schooner Johanna Smith was converted to a gambling ship and moored off Long Beach, California. She caught fire and sank in 1932.

On New Year's Day 1937, during the Great Depression, gambling ship SS Monte Carlo, well-known for "drinks, dice, and dolls," was wrecked on a beach about a quarter mile south of the Hotel del Coronado, near San Diego.

Other gambling ships operating off California during the 1930s included Rose Isle (aka Johanna Smith II), Casino (fka James Tuft), SS Texas (aka City of Panama; aka Star of Hollywood; aka La Playa), Showboat (aka Mount Baker; aka Caliente), SS Reno (operating off San Diego), and William H. Harriman (operating off Santa Barbara).

Anthony Cornero operated the gambling ships SS Rex and SS Tango during the 1930s. California Attorney General Earl Warren ordered raids on the gambling ships. On August 1, 1939, state authorities raided SS Texas and SS Rex off Santa Monica and Showboat and SS Tango off Long Beach. A court ruling later that year permanently shut them down. However, in 1946 Cornero opened the SS Lux off Long Beach. It was quickly shut down. In 1948, President Harry Truman signed an act prohibiting the operation of any gambling ship in U.S. territorial waters.

== In Hawaii ==
As of December 17, 2020, Hawaii is one of only two U.S. states outlawing any form of gambling. Even though Hawaii has strict rules on its ports, a foreign flagged cruise ship that offers gambling aboard can dock if it travels in international waters and only conducts its gambling there.

== In Hong Kong ==
The popularity of gambling ships increased in Hong Kong following the anti-corruption campaign under Xi Jinping which began in 2012, under which high-ranking government officials and executives at state-owned enterprises are barred from gambling in Macau. In 2011, the Immigration Department reported 466,000 tourists from mainland China visited gambling ships, a 17.4% increase from 2010. Eight gambling ships were operating in Hong Kong during 2013, many of them operated by triad organized crime syndicates. These ships have been criticized for their use of misleading sales techniques and for their risk to public safety due to the difficulty of law enforcement against their operation.

== Economics ==
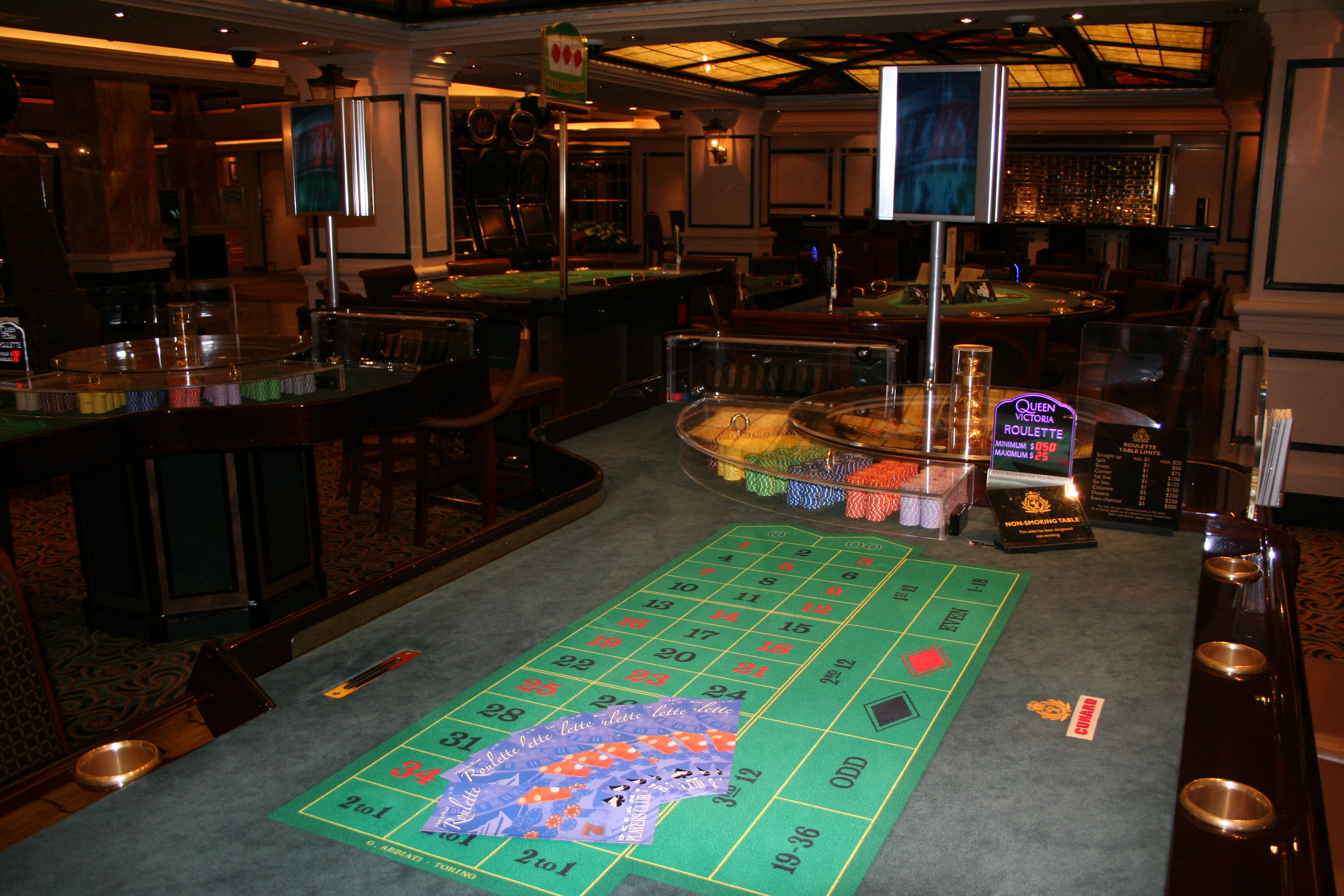
An empty casino aboard a large cruise ship in 2009

The economics of gambling ships are quite different from traditional bricks-and-mortar casinos. Ships afloat are expensive to maintain. Transport of passengers to and from them is time-consuming, expensive, and largely "time lost" to those who wish to gamble. Further, entertainment - and alternative gambling - opportunities are severely limited for potential customers, who can see and do more ashore where gambling is legal, as in Las Vegas and Atlantic City in the United States. This is only compounded when the offshore gambling trip is turned into an overnight stay.

Economies of scale make it hard for smaller companies to compete with larger ones such as Carnival Corps and Royal Caribbean Cruises Ltd. One of the factors is that the bigger companies can afford to make newer and bigger ships. Newer ships could already hold up to 4,400 passengers and crew in 1995. Further, the newer ships are safer, and older ships that are not equipped with the new International Maritime Organization (IMO) safety standards have to be upgraded to meet them. According to an Oppenheimer & Co. analyst, this suggested at the time that the industry would end up ruled by two to three big companies.

== In popular culture ==
Californian gambling ships appear in several novels and movies of the period, including Sing a Song of Murder (1942) by James R. Langham, The Case of the Dangerous Dowager (1937) by Erle Stanley Gardner, and Farewell, My Lovely (1940) by Raymond Chandler. The 1940 film Gambling on the High Seas was set in part aboard a gambling ship, SS Sylvania. Other films that feature gambling ships include Gambling Ship, Dante's Inferno, Smashing the Money Ring, and Mr. Lucky (1943) starring Cary Grant as a gambling ship operator, which spawned the later Mr. Lucky TV series.

== See also ==
- Riverboat casino
