= List of United States Navy ships: D–F =

Ships of the United States Navy

Ships in current service
- Current ships

Ships grouped alphabetically
- A–B; C; D–F; G–H; I–K; L; M; N–O; P; Q–R; S; T–V; W–Z

Ships grouped by type
- Aircraft carriers; Airships; Amphibious warfare ships; Auxiliaries; Battlecruisers; Battleships; Cruisers; Destroyers; Destroyer escorts; Destroyer leaders; Escort carriers; Frigates; Hospital ships; Littoral combat ships; Mine warfare vessels; Monitors; Oilers; Patrol vessels; Registered civilian vessels; Sailing frigates; Steam frigates; Steam gunboats; Ships of the line; Sloops of war; Submarines; Torpedo boats; Torpedo retrievers; Unclassified miscellaneous; Yard and district craft

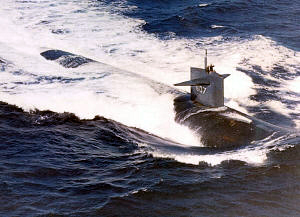
USS Dace (SSN-607)

This section of the list of United States Navy ships contains all ships of the United States Navy with names beginning with D, E and F.

For a list exclusively of currently commissioned ships, see the List of current ships of the United States Navy.

For ships with unique names, "USS Ship‍name" redirects to the ship article. For reused names, "USS Ship‍name" is an index page for the ships of that name; the links after the name lead to the specific ship pages.

== D ==
- USS D-1 (SS-17)
- USS D-2 (SS-18)
- USS D-3 (SS-19)

=== Da ===
- USS Da Nang (LHA-5)
- USS Dace (SS-247, SSN-607)
- USS Dacotah (1859)
- USS Dade (APA-99)
- USS Daedalus (ARL-35)
- USS Daffodil (1862)
- USS Daggett County (LST-689)
- USS Dahl (T-AKR-312)
- USS Dahlgren (TB-9, DD-187/AG-91, DL-12/DLG-12/DDG-43)
- USS Dahlia (1862)
- USS Dahlonega (YTB-770)
- USS Dai Ching (1863)
- USS Daiquiri (SP-1285)
- USS Daisy (1850, 1863, SP-22, 1917, SP-1186)
- Daisy Archer (ID-1283)
- USS Dakotan (ID-3882)
- USS Dale (1839, DD-4, DD-290, DD-353, DLG-19/CG-19)
- USS Dale W. Peterson (DE-337)
- USS Dalhart (PC-619)
- USS Dallas (DD-199, CA-140, CA-150, WHEC-716, SSN-700)
- USNS Dalton Victory (T-AK-256)
- USS Daly (DD-519)
- USS Damato (DD-871)
- USS Damon Cummings (DE-756)
- USS Damon M. Cummings (DE-643)
- USS Dan Smith (1861)
- USS Dana (1861)
- USS Dandelion (1862)
- USS Dane (APA-238)
- USS Dania (PCE-870)
- USS Daniel (DE-335)
- USS Daniel A. Joy (DE-585)
- USS Daniel Boone (SSBN-629)
- USS Daniel Inouye (DDG-118)
- USS Daniel T. Griffin (DE-54/APD-38)
- USS Daniel Webster (SSBN-626/MTS-626)
- USS Danville (PG-105)
- USS Dapdap (YFB-684)
- USS Daraga (SP-43)
- USS Darby (DE-218)
- USS Daring (AM-87)
- USS Darke (APA-159)
- USS Darlington (1862)
- USS Dart (1861, YFB-308)
- USS Darter (SS-227, SS-576)
- USS Dash (AM-88, AM-428/MSO-428)
- USS Dashiell (DD-659)
- USS Dauntless (1861, SP-1002, PG-61, T-AGOS-11)
- USS Dauphin (APA-97)
- USS Davenport (PG-177/PF-69)
- USCGC Davey (WYT-81)
- USNS David C. Shanks (T-AP-180)
- USS David R. Ray (DD-971)
- USS David W. Taylor (DD-551)
- USS Davidson (DE-1045/FF-1045)
- USS Daviess County (LST-692/T-LST-692)
- USS Davis (TB-12, DD-65, DD-395, DD-937)
- USS Davis K. Philips (SP-978)
- USS Davison (DD-618/DMS-37)
- USS Dawn (1857, SP-26, SP-37, IX-186)
- USS Dawson (APA-79)
- USS Day (DE-225)
- USS Daylight (1859)
- USS Dayton (CL-78, CL-105)

=== De ===
- USS De Grasse (ID-1217, AP-164/AK-223)
- USS De Haven (DD-469, DD-727)
- USS De Kalb County (LST-715/T-LST-715)
- USS De Lesseps (1918)
- USS De Soto (1860, 1861)
- USS De Steiguer (T-AGOR-12)
- USS De Wert (FFG-45)
- USS Deal (AG-131/AKL-2)
- USS Dealey (DE-1006)
- USS Dean II (SP-98)
- USS Deane (1778, DE-86)
- USS Dearborn (PF-33)
- USS Decatur (1839, DD-5, DD-341, DD-936/DDG-31, DDG-73)
- USS Decker (DE-47)
- USS Decoy (1822)
- USS Deede (DE-263)
- USS Deer Island (YAG-62)
- USS Defender (MCM-2)
- USS Defense (AM-317/MSF-317)
- USS Defiance (SP-1015, ID-3327, AMc-73, PGM-95/PG-95)
- Defiant (YT-804)
- USS Deft (AM-216/MSF-216)
- USS Deimos (AK-78, AKL-40)
- USS DeKalb (ID-3010)
- USS Dekanawida (YT-334/YTB-334, YTB-831)
- USS Dekanisora (YT-252/YTB-252/YTM-252)
- USS Dekaury (YT-178/YTB-178/YTM-178)
- USNS Del Monte (T-AK-5049)
- USNS Del Valle (T-AK-5050)
- SS Del Viento (AK-5026)
- USS Delaware (1776, 1798, 1820, 1861, 1866, SP-467, BB-28, SSN-791)
- USS Delaware Valley (YFB-83)
- USS Delbert D. Black (DDG-119)
- USS Delbert W. Halsey (DE-310)
- USS Delegate (AM-217)
- USS Delgada (AVG-40/ACV-40/CVE-40)
- USS Deliver (ARS-23)
- USS DeLong (TB-28, DD-129, DE-684/APD-137)
- USS Delphinus (AF-24, PHM-1)
- USS Delphy (DD-261)
- USS Delta (1864, AK-29/AR-9)
- USS Delta King (YHB-6/YFB-55)
- USS Delta Queen (YHB-7/YFB-56)
- USS Demand (AMc-74)
- USS Demeter (ARB-10)
- USS Deming (PCS-1392)
- USS Democracy (ID-2215)
- USS Dempsey (DE-26, DE-267)
- USS Denebola (AD-12, AF-56, T-AK-289/T-AKR-289)
- USS Dennis (DE-405)
- USS Dennis J. Buckley (DE-553, DD-808/DDR-808)
- USS Density (AM-218/MSF-218)
- USS Dent (DD-116/APD-9)
- USS Dentuda (SS-335/AGSS-335)
- USS Denver (C-14/PG-28/CL-16, CL-58, LPD-9)
- USS Deperm (ADG-10)
- USS Derickson (AGS-6)
- USS Derrick (YO-59)
- USS Derry (ID-1391)
- USS Des Moines (C-15/PG-29/CL-17, CA-75, CA-134)
- USS Design (AM-219/MSF-219)
- USS Desire (SP-786)
- USS DeSoto County (LST-1171)
- USS Despatch (1814, 1852, 1873, 1902, SP-68/PY-8, YFB-6, IX-2)
- USS Despite (AM-89)
- USS Desplaines River (LSM(R)-412/LFR-412)
- USS Detector (AMc-75, AM-429/MSO-429)
- USS Detroit (1813, 1865, 1869, C-10, CL-8, AOE-4, LCS-7)
- USS Deucalion (AR-15)
- USS Deuel (APA-160)
- USS Devastator (AM-318/MSF-318, MCM-6)
- USS Develin (AMc-45)
- USS Device (AM-220/MSF-220)
- USS Devilfish (SS-292/AGSS-292)
- USS Devosa (AKA-27)
- USS Dewees (YFB-37)
- USS Dewey (YFD-1, DD-349, DLG-7, DLG-14/DDG-45, DDG-105)
- USCGC Dexter (WAGC-18/WAVP-385/WHEC-385)
- USS Dextrous (AM-341/MSF-341, MCM-13)
- USS Deyo (DD-989)

=== Di ===
- USS Diablo (SS-479/AGSS-479)
- USS Diachenko (APD-123/LPR-123)
- USS Diamond (1897)
- USS Diamond Head (AE-19)
- SS Diamond State (T-ACS-7)
- USS Diana (1862)
- USS Dianthus (SP-639)
- USS Dickens (APA-161)
- USS Dickerson (DD-157/APD-21)
- USS Dicky (SP-231)
- USS Dictator (1863)
- USS Didrickson Bay (AVG-64/ACV-64, CVE-100)
- USS Diligence (1797, AFDL-48, WMEC-616)
- USS Diligent (1779, YT-113)
- USS Diodon (SS-349)
- USS Diomedes (ARB-11)
- USS Dionne (DE-261)
- USS Dionysus (AR-21)
- USS Diphda (AKA-59)
- USS Diploma (AM-221/MSF-221)
- USS Dipper (AM-357/MSF-357)
- USS Direct (AM-90, AM-430/MSO-430)
- USS Discoverer (1918/ARS-3)
- USS Discovery Bay (YTT-11)
- USS Disdain (AM-222/MSF-222)
- USS District of Columbia (SSBN-826)
- USS Dithmarschen (IX-301)
- USS Diver (ARS-5)
- USS Dixie (AD-1, AD-14)
- USS Dixie III (SP-701)
- USS Dixon (AS-37)
- USS Dlonra (SP-66)

=== Do ===
- USS Dobbin (AD-3)
- USS Dobler (DE-48)
- USS Dochra (ID-1758)
- USS Doddridge (AK-176)
- USS Dodge County (LST-722)
- USS Dodger II (SP-46)
- USS Dogfish (SS-350)
- USS Dogwood (YN-9)
- USS Dohasan (YT-335/YTM-335)
- USS Dohema Jr. (SP-612)
- USS Doherty (DE-14)
- USS Doloma (SP-1062)
- USS Dolomi Bay (CVE-101)
- USNS Dolores Huerta (T-AO-214)
- USS Dolphin (1777, 1821, 1836, PG-24, ID-874, SS-169, AGSS-555)
- USS Dominant (AMc-76, AM-431/MSO-431)
- USS Domino (IX-208)
- USS Don (1862)
- USS Don Juan de Austria (1887)
- USS Don Marquis (IX-215)
- USS Don O. Woods (DE-721/APD-118)
- USNS Don Walsh (T-AGOS-25)
- USS Donacona (YN-39/YNT-7/YTM-733)
- USS Donald B. Beary (DE-1085/FF-1085/FFT-1085)
- USS Donald Cook (DDG-75)
- USS Donald W. Wolf (DE-713/APD-129)
- USS Donaldson (DE-44, DE-55, DE-508)
- USS Doncella (SS-351)
- USS Doneff (DE-49)
- USS Donegal (1860)
- USS Donnell (DE-56/IX-182)
- USS Donner (LSD-20)
- USS Dorado (SS-248, SS-526)
- USS Doran (DD-185, DD-634/DMS-41)
- USS Dorchester (SP-1509, AKS-17/APB-46)
- USS Doris B. III (SP-733)
- USS Doris B. IV (SP-625)
- USS Doris Miller (CVN-81)
- USS Dorothea (1898)
- USS Dorothea L. Dix (AP-67)
- USS Dorothy (SP-1289)
- USS Dorothy Cullen (ID-2183)
- USS Dorsey (DD-117/DMS-1)
- USS Dortch (DD-670)
- USS Dory (SS-352)
- USS Dotterel (AM-358/MSF-358, AMS-72/MSC-72)
- USS Douglas (APR-7, PGM-100/PG-100)
- USS Douglas County (LST-731)
- USS Douglas A. Munro (DE-422)
- USS Douglas H. Fox (DD-779)
- USS Douglas L. Howard (DE-138)
- USS Douglas County (LST-731)
- USS Dour (AM-223/MSF-223)
- USS Dover (IX-30)
- USS Downes (DD-45, DD-375, DE-1070/FF-1070)
- USS Doyen (DD-280, AP-2/APA-1)
- USS Doyle (DD-494/DMS-34, FFG-39)
- USS Doyle C. Barnes (DE-353)

=== Dr–Dy ===
- USS Draco (AK-79)
- USS Dragon (1861)
- USS Dragonet (SS-293)
- USS Drake (AM-359)
- USS Drayton (DD-23, DD-366)
- USS Dreadnaught (ID-1951/YT-34/YNG-21)
- USS Dreadnought (SP-584)
- USS Drechterland (ID-2793)
- USS Drew (APA-162)
- USS Drexler (DD-741)
- USS Driller (YO-61)
- USS Driver (AM-360/MSF-360)
- USS Druid (SP-321)
- USS Drum (SS-228/AGSS-228, SSN-677)
- USS Drury (DE-46)
- USS Drusilla (SP-372)
- USS Du Pont (TB-7, DD-152/AG-80, DD-941)
- USS Duane (AGC-6/WPG-33/WHEC-33)
- USS Dubhe (ID-2562)
- USS Dubuque (AG-6/IX-9/PG-17, LPD-8)
- USS Duc de Lauzun (1782)
- USS Duffy (DE-27, DE-268)
- USS Dufilho (DE-423)
- USS Dugong (SS-353)
- USS Dukes County (LST-735)
- USS Duluth (CL-87, LPD-6)
- USS Dumaran (ARG-14)
- USS Dumbarton (1861)
- USS Duncan (DD-46, DD-485, DD-874/DDR-874, FFG-10)
- USS Dunderberg (1865)
- USS Dunlap (DD-384)
- USS Dunlin (AM-361, AMCU-23)
- USS Dunn County (LST-742)
- USS DuPage (AP-86/APA-41, APB-51)
- USS Duplin (AKA-87)
- USS Durango (PC-1260)
- USS Durant (DE-389/WDE-489/DER-389)
- USS Durham (ID-3375/AKA-114/LKA-114)
- USS Durik (DE-666/APD-68)
- USS Dutchess (APR-5, APA-98)
- USS Dutton (AGS-8/AGSC-8, T-AGS-22)
- USS Duval (AK-177)
- USS Duval County (LST-758)
- USS Duxbury Bay (AVP-38)
- USS Dwight D. Eisenhower (CVAN-69/CVN-69)
- USS Dwyn Wen (IX-58)
- USS Dyer (DD-84)
- USS Dyess (DD-880/DDR-880)
- USS Dynamic (AM-91, AM-432/MSO-432, AFDL-6)
- USS Dyson (DD-572)

== E ==
- USS E-1 (SS-24)
- USS E-2 (SS-25)
- USS E. A. Poe (IX-103)
- USS E. B. Hale (1861)
- USS E. Benson Dennis (SP-791)

=== Ea–Ek ===
- USS Eager (AM-224/MSF-224)
- USS Eagle (1798, USRC, 1812, 1814, 1814 schooner, 1898, SP-145, 1925, AM-132, WIX-327)
- Eagle class patrol craft (USS Eagle No. 1 (PE-1) – USS Eagle No. 60 (PE-60))
- USS Eaglet (SP-909)
- USNS Eagleview (T-AGSE-3)
- USS Eagre (1903)
- USS Earheart (DE-603/APD-113)
- USS Earl K. Olsen (DE-765)
- USS Earl V. Johnson (DE-702)
- USNS Earl Warren (T-AO-207)
- USS Earle (DD-635/DMS-42)
- USS Earle B. Hall (DE-597/APD-107)
- USS Earnest (1898)
- USS East Boston (1892)
- USS East Hampton (SP-573)
- USS Eastern Chief (ID-3390)
- USS Eastern Light (ID-3538)
- USS Eastern Queen (ID-3406)
- USS Eastern Shore (ID-3500)
- USS Easterner (SP-3331)
- USS Eastland (APA-163)
- USS Eastport (1862, ID-3342)
- USS Eastwind (IX-234)
- USS Eaton (DD-510/DDE-510)
- USS Eberle (DD-430)
- USS Ebert (DE-74, DE-768)
- USS Ebony (YN-10/AN-15)
- USS Echo (1928, IX-95)
- USS Echols (APB-37/IX-504)
- USS Eclipse (SP-417)
- USS Edamena II (SP-14)
- USS Eddelyn (1919)
- USS Eddy County (LST-759)
- USS Edenshaw (YT-459/YTB-459, YTB-752/WYTB-108752)
- USS Edenton (ID-3696/AK-38, SP-3696, PC-1077, ATS-1)
- USS Edgar F. Coney (SP-346)
- USS Edgar F. Luckenbach (ID-4597) (ID-4597)
- USS Edgar G. Chase (DE-16)
- USS Edgecombe (ID-3894, APA-164)
- USS Edison (DD-439)
- USS Edisto (AVG-41/ACV-41/CVE-41, AG-89/AGB-2/WAGB-284, WPB-1313)
- USS Edith (1849, ID-3459)
- USS Edith II (SP-296)
- USS Edith M. III (SP-196)
- USS Edithena (SP-624)
- USS Edithia (SP-214/YP-214)
- USS Edmonds (DE-406)
- USS Edorea (SP-549)
- USS Edsall (DD-219, DE-129)
- USS Edson (DD-946)
- USS Edward C. Daly (DE-17)
- USS Edward H. Allen (DE-531)
- USS Edward J. McKeever Jr. (SP-684)
- USS Edward Kavanaugh (YAG-38)
- USS Edward L. Dohney III (ID-3835)
- USS Edward Luckenbach (ID-1662)
- USS Edward McDonnell (DE-1043/FF-1043)
- USS Edward Rutledge (AP-52/APA-24)
- USS Edwards (DD-265, DD-619)
- USS Edwin A. Howard (DE-346)
- USS Edwin L. Pilsbury (SP-964)
- USS Eel (SS-354) (SS-354)
- USS Efco (ID-2405)
- USS Effective (AM-92/PC-1596, T-AGOS-21)
- USS Effingham (1777, APA-165)
- USS Egeria (ARL-8)
- USS Egret (AMc-24/IX-181, AMS-46/MSC(O)-46)
- USS Eichenberger (DE-202)
- USS Eider (AM-17)
- USS Eisele (DE-34, DE-75)
- USS Eisenhower (CVAN-69)
- USS Eisner (DE-192, DE-269)

=== El–Em ===
- USS El Cano (IX-79)
- USS El Capitan (ID-1407)
- USS El Occidente (ID-3307)
- USS El Oriente (ID-4504)
- USS El Paso (PG-149/PF-41, AKA-117/LKA-117)
- USS El Sol (ID-4505)
- USS El Siglo (ID-4510)
- USS Elba (AG-132/AKL-3)
- USS Elbour Bay (ACV-66, CVE-102)
- USS Elcano (PG-38)
- USS Elden (DE-264)
- USS Elder (YN-15/AN-20)
- USS Eldorado (AGC-11/LCC-11)
- USS Eldridge (DE-173)
- USS Eleanor (SP-677)
- USS Electra (1843, AK-21/AKA-4, WPC-187)
- USS Electron (AG-146/AKS-27)
- USS Elf (SP-81)
- USS Elfin (1864, SP-965)
- USS Elfrida (SP-988)
- USS Elinor (SP-2465)
- USNS Elisha Kent Kane (T-AGS-27)
- USS Elithro II (SP-15)
- USS Eli Whitney (YAG-46)
- USS Eliza Hayward (SP-1414)
- USS Elizabeth (SP-972, SP-1092)
- USS Elizabeth C. Stanton (AP-69)
- USS Elizabeth M. Froelich (SP-380)
- USS Elk (1863, IX-115)
- USS Elk River (LSM(R)-501/IX-501)
- USS Elkhart (APA-80)
- USS Elkhorn (AOG-7)
- USS Elkins (PC-1216)
- USS Ella (1862, 1864, SP-1676)
- USS Ellen (1861, SP-284)
- USS Ellen Browning (YP-3234)
- USS Ellet (DD-398)
- USS Ellington (SP-776)
- USS Elliot (DD-146/DMS-4/AG-104, DD-967)
- USS Ellis (1862, DD-154/AG-115)
- USS Ellyson (DD-454/DMS-19)
- USS Elmasada (SP-109)
- USS Elmer Montgomery (DE-1082/FF-1082)
- USS Elmore (AP-87/APA-42)
- USS Elokomin (AO-55)
- USS Elrod (FFG-55)
- USS Elsie III (SP-708)
- USS Elsmore (PCS-1413)
- USNS Eltanin (T-AK-270/T-AGOR-8)
- USS Elusive (AM-225)
- USS Ely (DE-309, PCE-880)
- USS Embattle (AM-226, AM-434/MSO-434)
- USS Embroil (AM-227)
- USS Emeline (SP-175)
- USS Emerald (1864, 1917, PYc-1)
- USS Emery (DE-28)
- USS Emily B. (ID-3731)
- USS Emma (1863, SP-1223)
- USS Emma Kate Ross (1918)
- USS Emmigrant (ID-3436)
- USS Emmons (DD-457/DMS-22)
- USS Emory S. Land (AS-39)
- USS Empire State (IX-38, AP-1001)
- USS Emporia (PG-136/PF-28)
- USS Empress (SP-569)

=== En–Es ===
- USS Enaj (SP-578)
- USS Enceladus (AK-80)
- USS Endeavor (AFDL-1)
- USS Endicott (DD-495/DMS-35)
- USS Endion (SP-707)
- USS Endurance (AMc-77, ARDM-3, AM-435/MSO-435)
- USS Endymion (ARL-9)
- USS Energy (AMc-78, AM-436/MSO-436)
- USS Engage (AM-93, AM-433/MSO-433)
- USS Engineer (1836, YFB-12)
- USS England (DE-635/APD-41, DLG-22/CG-22)
- USS English (DD-696)
- USS Engstrom (DE-50)
- USS Enhance (AM-228, AM-437/MSO-437)
- USS Eniwetok (CVE-125)
- USS Enoree (AO-69)
- USS Enquirer (1896)
- USS Enright (DE-216/APD-66)
- USS Ensenada (YF-852)
- USS Ensenore (YT-217/YTB-217)
- USS Ensign (SP-1051)
- USS Entemedor (SS-340)
- USS Enterprise (1775, 1776, 1799, 1831, 1874, SP-790, CV-6/CV(N)-6/CVA-6/CVS-6, CVN-65, AK-5059, CVN-80)
- USS Eolus (1864, 1869)
- USS Epanow (YT-275/YTB-275)
- USS Epervier (1814)
- USS Epperson (DD-719/DDE-719)
- USS Epping Forest (APM-4/LSD-4/MCS-7)
- USS Epsilon (1864)
- SS Equality State (T-ACS-8)
- USS Equity (AM-229)
- USS Erben (DD-631)
- USS Erebus (1865)
- USS Ericsson (TB-2, DD-56, DD-440)
- USS Eridanus (AK-92)
- USS Erie (1813, PG-50)
- USS Ernest E. Evans (DDG-141)
- USS Ernest G. Small (DD-838/DDR-838)
- USS Erskine M. Phelps (YON-147)
- USS Errol (AG-133/AKL-4)
- USS Escalante (AO-70)
- USS Escalante River (LSM(R)-502)
- USS Escambia (AO-80/T-AO-80)
- USCGC Escanaba (WPG-77, WPG-64/WHEC-64, WMEC-907)
- USS Escandido (PC-1179)
- USS Escape (ARS-6/WMEC-6)
- USS Escatawpa (AOG-27)
- USS Escolar (SS-294)
- USS Esmeraldo County (LST-761)
- USS Espada (SS-355)
- USS Esselen (AT-147/ATO-147)
- USS Essex (1799, 1856, 1876, CV-9, LHD-2)
- USS Essex Junior (1813)
- USS Essington (DE-67)
- USS Esteem (AM-230, AM-438/MSO-438)
- USS Estella (SP-537)
- USS Estelle (SP-747)
- USS Estero (AVG-42/ACV-42/CVE-42, AG-134/AKL-5)
- USS Estes (AGC-12/LCC-12)
- USS Estocin (FFG-15)
- USS Estrella (1862)

=== Et–Ex ===
- USS Etamin (AK-93/IX-173)
- USS Etawina (YTB-543/YTM-543)
- USS Eten (ID-4041)
- USS Ethan Allen (1861, SSBN-608/SSN-608)
- USS Etlah (1864, YN-98/AN-79)
- USS Etna (1806, 1813, 1847)
- USS Etta M. Burns (SP-542)
- USS Eucalyptus (YN-11/AN-16)
- USS Eufaula (PCS-1384, YTB-800)
- USS Eugene (PG-148/PF-40)
- USS Eugene A. Greene (DE-549, DD-711/DDR-711)
- USS Eugene E. Elmore (DE-686)
- USS Eugene F. Price (SP-839)
- USS Eugenie (1862)
- USS Euhaw (IX-85)
- USS Eunice (PCE-846)
- USS Euphemia (SP-539)
- USS Eurana (SP-1594)
- USS Eureka (1862, IX-221)
- USS Europa (AK-81, AP-177)
- USS Euryale (AS-22)
- USS Eutaw (1863)
- USS Evans (DD-78, DD-552, DE-1023)
- USS Evansville (ID-2996, PG-178/PF-70)
- USS Evarts (DE-5)
- USS Evea (YT-458/YTB-458)
- USS Evelyn (ID-2228)
- USS Event (AM-231)
- USS Everett (PG-116/PF-8)
- USS Everett Alvarez Jr. (FFG-68)
- USS Everett F. Larson (DE-554, DD-830/DD-830)
- USS Everglades (AD-24)
- USS Eversole (DE-404, DD-789)
- USS Excel (AM-94, AM-439/MSO-439)
- USS Exchange (1862)
- USS Execute (AM-232/MSF-232)
- USS Experiment (1799, 1832)
- USS Exploit (AM-95, AM-440/MSO-440)
- USS Explorer (1904, OSS 28)
- USS Express No. 4 (SP-745)
- USS Extractor (ARS-15)
- USS Extricate (ARS-16)
- USS Exultant (AMc-79, AM-441/MSO-441)

== F ==
- USS F-1 (SS-20)
- USS F-2 (SS-21)
- USS F-3 (SS-22)
- USS F-4 (SS-23)
- USS F. J. Luckenbach (ID-2160)
- USS F. Mansfield & Sons Co. (SP-691)

=== Fa ===
- USS Fabius (ARVA-5)
- USS Facility (AM-233/MSF-233)
- USS Fahkee (1862)
- USS Fahrion (FFG-22)
- USS Fair (DE-35)
- USS Fair American (1812)
- USS Fairfax (DD-93)
- USS Fairfax County (LST-1193)
- USS Fairfield (1828, AK-178)
- USS Fairmont (ID-2429)
- USS Fairplay (1859)
- USS Fairview (PCE(R)-850/EPCE(R)-850)
- USS Fairy (1861)
- USS Falcon (1846, World War I, AM-28/ASR-2, AMS-190/MSC-190, MHC-59)
- USS Falgout (DE-324/WDE-424/DER-324)
- USS Falkner (YFB-26)
- USS Fall River (CA-131, CG-14, T-JHSV-4/T-EPF-4)
- USS Fallon (APA-81)
- USS Fallujah (LHA-9)
- USS Falmouth (1827)
- USS Fancy (AM-234/MSF-234)
- USS Fanegal (SS-356)
- USS Fanning (DD-37, DD-385, DE-1076/FF-1076)
- USS Fanny Mason (1847)
- USS Fanny Skinner (1847)
- USS Fanshaw Bay (CVE-70/CVHE-70)
- USS Fantana (SP-71)
- USS Farenholt (DD-332, DD-491)
- USS Fargo (CL-85, CL-106)
- USS Faribault (AK-179)
- USS Farmington (PCE-894)
- USS Farquhar (DD-304, DE-139)
- USS Farragut (TB-11, DD-300, DD-348, DL-6/DLG-6/DDG-37, DDG-99)
- USS Fashion (ID-755)
- USS Favorite (IX-45)
- USS Favourite (BAT-3)
- USS Fawn (1863)
- USS Fayette (AP-88/APA-43)

=== Fe–Fi ===
- USS Fearless (SP-724, AMc-80, AM-442/MSO-442)
- USS Fearnot (1861)
- USS Fechteler (DE-157, DD-870/DDR-870)
- USS Federal (ID-3657)
- USS Feland (AP-18/APA-11)
- USS Feldspar (IX-159)
- USS Felicia (SP-642, PYc-35)
- USS Felix Taussig (ID-2282)
- USS Fenimore (ID-2681)
- USS Fenimore Cooper (1853)
- USS Fentress (AK-180/T-AK-180)
- USS Fergus (APA-82)
- USS Fern (1862, 1871, 1917)
- USS Fernandina (1861)
- USS Feronia (ARL-45)
- USS Ferret (1806, 1812, 1822)
- USS Fessenden (DE-142/DER-142)
- USS Fidelity (AM-96, AM-443/MSO-443)
- USS Fieberling (DE-640)
- USS Fierce (AM-97)
- USS Fife (DD-991)
- USS Fillmore (APA-83)
- USS Finback (SS-230, SSN-670)
- USS Finch (AM-9, DE-328/WDE-428/DER-328)
- USS Finland (ID-4543)
- USS Finnegan (DE-307)
- USS Fir (YN-12)
- USS Fire Island
- USS Firebolt (PC-10)
- USS Firebrand (1815)
- USS Firecrest (AMc-33, AM-394, AMS-10/MSC(O)-10)
- USS Firedrake (AE-14)
- USS Firefly (1814)
- USS Firm (AM-98, AM-444/MSO-444)
- USS Fish Hawk (1879)
- USNS Fisher (T-AKR-301)
- USS Fiske (DE-143, DD-842/DDR-842)
- USS Fitch (DD-462/DMS-25)
- USS Fitzgerald (DDG-62)
- USS Fitzroy (DE-88)
- USS Fixity (AM-235/MSF-235)

=== Fl ===
- USS Flag (1861)
- USS Flagler (AK-181)
- USS Flagstaff (T-AGM-21, PGH-1)
- USS Flaherty (DE-135)
- USS Flambeau (1814, 1861, IX-192)
- USS Flambeau River (LSM(R)-503)
- USS Flame (AM-236)
- USS Flamingo (AM-32, AMc-22/IX-180, AMS-11/MSC(O)-11)
- USS Flasher (SS-249, SSN-613)
- USS Flatley (FFG-21)
- USS Fleming (DE-32, DE-271)
- USS Fletcher (DD-445/DDE-445, DD-992)
- USS Fli-Hawk (SP-550)
- USS Flicker (AM-70/IX-165, AMS-9/MSC(O)-9, AM-416)
- SS Flickertail State (T-ACS-5)
- USS Flier (SS-250)
- USS Flint (CL-64, CL-97/CLAA-97, AE-32/T-AE-32)
- USS Flirt (1839)
- USS Florence (SP-173)
- USS Florence Nightingale (AP-70)
- USS Florida (1824, 1861, 1869, BM-9, BB-30, SSBN-728/SSGN-728)
- USS Floridian (ID-3875)
- USS Florikan (ASR-9)
- USS Flounder (SS-251)
- USS Floyd B. Parks (DD-884)
- USS Floyd County (LST-762)
- USS Floyd Hurst (SP-2384)
- USS Floyd W. Spencer (YAG-36)
- USS Floyds Bay (AVP-40)
- USS Flusser (1864, DD-20, DD-289, DD-368)
- USS Fly (1776)
- USS Flyer (T-AG-178)
- USS Flying Fish (1838, SS-229/AGSS-229, SSN-673)

=== Fo ===
- USS Foam (ID-2496)
- USS Fogg (DE-57/DER-57)
- USS Foley (DE-270)
- USS Folly (SP-1453)
- USS Fomalhaut (AK-22/AKA-5/AE-20)
- USS Fond du Lac (APA-166)
- USS Foote (TB-3, DD-169, DD-511)
- USS Force (AM-99, AM-445/MSO-445)
- USS Ford (FFG-54)
- USS Ford County (LST-772)
- USS Foreman (DE-633)
- USS Forest Rose (1862)
- USS Formoe (DE-58, DE-509)
- USS Forrest (DD-461/DMS-24)
- USS Forrest Royal (DD-872)
- USS Forrest Sherman (DD-931, DDG-98)
- USS Forrestal (CVB-59/CVA-59/CV-59/AVT-59)
- USS Forster (DE-4, DE-334/WDE-434/DER-334)
- USS Forsyth (PF-102/PG-210)
- USS Fort Donelson (1862)
- USS Fort Fisher (LSD-40)
- USS Fort Henry (1862)
- USS Fort Hindman (1863)
- USS Fort Jackson (1862)
- USS Fort Lauderdale (LPD-28)
- USS Fort Mandan (LSD-21)
- USS Fort Marion (LSD-22)
- USS Fort McHenry (LSD-43)
- USS Fort Morgan (1863)
- USS Fort Snelling (LSD-23, LSD-30)
- USS Fort Wayne (SP-3786)
- USS Fort Worth (LCS-3)
- USS Fortaleza Bay (CVE-72)
- USS Fortazela Bay (ACV-72/CVE-72)
- USS Fortify (AM-237, AM-446/MSO-446)
- USS Fortitude (AMc-81, JHSV-3)
- USS Fortune (1865, YT-11, AVS-2/IX-146)
- USS Forward (1882)
- USS Foss (DE-59)
- USS Fowler (DE-222)
- USS Fox (1822, 1859, TB-13, DD-234/AG-85, DLG-33/CG-33)
- USS Fox Island IV (1917)

=== Fr–Fu ===
- USS Frament (DE-677/APD-77)
- USS Frances (1813)
- USS Frances II (SP-503)
- USS Frances B. Hackett (ID-1611/YT-36)
- USS Francis G. Conwell (ID-3215)
- USS Francis Hammond (DE-1067/FF-1067)
- USS Francis M. Robinson (DE-220)
- USS Francis Marion (APA-249/LPA-249)
- USS Francis Scott Key (SSBN-657)
- USS Francovich (DE-379, DE-606/APD-116)
- USS Frank Cable (AS-40)
- USS Frank E. Evans (DD-754)
- USS Frank E. Petersen Jr. (DDG-121)
- USS Frank H. Buck (SP-1613)
- USNS Frank J. Petraca (T-AK-250)
- USS Frank Knox (DD-742/DDR-742)
- USS Frankford (DD-497)
- USS Frankfurt (1915)
- USS Franklin (1775, 1795, 1815, 1864, CV-13/AVT-8)
- USS Franklin Bell (AP-34)
- USS Franklin D. Roosevelt (CVB-42/CVA-42/CV-42)
- USS Franks (DD-554)
- USS Frazier (DD-607)
- USNS Fred C. Ainsworth (T-AP-181)
- USS Fred T. Berry (DD-858/DDE-858)
- USS Freda (1881)
- USS Frederick (CA-8, LST-1184)
- USS Frederick C. Davis (DE-136)
- USS Frederick Funston (AP-48/APA-89/AP-178/T-AP-178)
- USS Frederick Luckenbach (1888)
- USS Fredrick Der Grosse (ID-1408)
- USS Fredonia (1845, PC-1174)
- USS Freedom (ID-3024, IX-43, LCS-1)
- USS Freehold (SP-347)
- USS Freelance (SP-830)
- USS Freestone (APA-167)
- USS Fremont (AP-89/APA-44/LPA-44)
- USS French (DE-367)
- USNS French Creek (T-AO-159)
- USS Fresno (SP-3063, CL-121/CLAA-121, LST-1182)
- USS Friar (SS-357)
- USS Frieda (SP-1618)
- USS Frigate Bird (AMc-27, AMS-191/MSC-191)
- USS Frolic (1813, 1862, 1892, SP-1336)
- USS Frontier (AD-25)
- USS Frost (DE-144)
- USS Frostburg (PC-785)
- USS Frosty Bay (CVE-112)
- USS Frybarger (DE-705/DEC-705)
- USS Frying Pan
- USS Fuchsia (1863)
- USS Fullam (DD-474)
- USS Fuller (DD-297, AP-14/APA-7)
- USS Fulmar (AMc-46, AMS-47/MSC(O)-47)
- USS Fulton (1815, 1837, AS-1/PG-49, AS-11)
- USNS Furman (T-AK-280)
- USS Furse (DD-882/DDR-882)
- USS Fury (1869, PG-69)
