= Endion =

Endion may refer to:

- Endion, the estate of Frederic Remington in New Rochelle, New York, in the United States
- East End / Endion (Duluth), a neighborhood in Duluth, Minnesota, in the United States
- Endion station, a historic railroad depot in Duluth, Minnesota, in the United States
- USS Endion (SP-707), a United States Navy patrol boat in commission from 1917 to 1919
