= USS Daisy =

USS Daisy may refer to one of the following United States Navy ships:

- USS Daisy (1850), a steam tug built in 1850 and acquired by the War Department for use in the Mississippi River and its tributaries early in the Civil War
- USS Daisy (1863), renamed Clover on 20 November 1863.
- USS Daisy (ID-22), a ferry launch that served the Norfolk Navy Yard from 1885 to 1919
- USS Daisy (1895) was a lighthouse tender, transferred to the Navy 11 April 1917 and served at Newport, Rhode Island, until returned to the Lighthouse Service on 1 July 1919
- USS Daisy (ID-1186), a yawl that served in a noncommissioned status in the 7th Naval District during World War I
