= USS Frigate Bird =

USS Frigate Bird is a name used more than once by the U.S. Navy:

- USS Frigate Bird (AMc-27), served in a non-commissioned status in the 13th Naval District between 30 January 1941 and 27 April 1943
- USS Frigate Bird (AMS-191), was launched 24 October 1953 by Quincy Adams Yacht Yard, Quincy, Massachusetts
