= USS Direct =

USS Direct was a name used more than once by the United States Navy in naming its ships:

- USS Direct (AM-90), launched 25 April 1942 by Dravo Corporation, Pittsburgh, Pennsylvania.
- USS Direct (AM-430), launched 27 May 1953 by Hiltebrant Dry Dock Co., Kingston, New York.
