= USS Endurance =

USS Endurance is a name used more than once by the U.S. Navy:

- USS Endurance (AMc-77), a coastal minesweeper launched on 19 June 1941.
- USS Endurance (ARDM-3), an auxiliary repair dry dock, delivered to the Navy on 1 February 1944.
- USS Endurance (AM-435), a minesweeper launched 8 August 1952.
