= USS Davey =

History

United States
- Name: USS Davey
- Namesake: Previous name retained
- Acquired: April 1917
- Out of service: 1919
- Homeport: Pilot Town, Louisiana
- Fate: Returned to United States Coast Guard

General characteristics
- Type: Patrol boat

USS Davey (WYT-81) was a United States Navy harbor entrance patrol and boarding vessel in service at Pilot Town, Louisiana during World War I.

Davey, originally a tug, was transferred by the United States Coast Guard to the Navy in April 1917. She was returned to the Coast Guard in 1919.

Nothing more is known about Davey
