= USS Dynamic =

USS Dynamic may refer to the following ships operated by the United States Navy:

- USS Dynamic (AM-91) was launched 26 May 1942 and decommissioned 19 November 1945.
- USS Dynamic (AM-432), an Aggressive-class minesweeper, was launched 17 December 1952, reclassified as MSO-432 in 1955, and sold to Spain on 1 August 1974.
- USS Dynamic (AFDL-6) is an auxiliary floating dry-dock, delivered to the Navy on 1 March 1944 and currently on active service.
