= USS Doris B. III =

Patrol vessel of the United States Navy

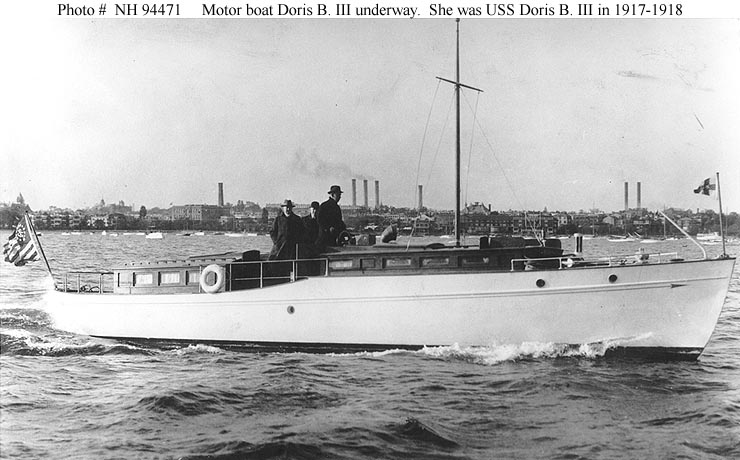
- Doris B. III as a civilian motorboat sometime between 1912 and 1917

History

United States
- Name: USS Doris B. III
- Namesake: Previous name retained
- Builder: Britt Brothers, Lynn, Massachusetts
- Completed: 1912
- Acquired: June 1917
- Commissioned: 25 June 1917
- Fate: Returned to owner 3 December 1918
- Notes: Operated as private motorboat Doris B. III 1912-1917 and from 1918

General characteristics
- Type: Patrol vessel
- Length: 48 ft (15 m)
- Beam: 10 ft (3.0 m)
- Draft: 3 ft 7 in (1.09 m)
- Speed: 12 knots
- Complement: 9
- Armament: 1 × 1-pounder gun

USS Doris B. III (SP-733) was a United States Navy patrol vessel in commission from 1917 to 1918.

== Background ==
Doris B. III was built as a private motorboat of the same name by Britt Brothers at Lynn, Massachusetts, in 1912. In June 1917, the U.S. Navy acquired her under a free lease from her owner, J. R. Jewett of Cambridge, Massachusetts, for use as a section patrol boat during World War I. She was commissioned as USS Doris B. III (SP-733) on 25 June 1917.

Assigned to the 2nd Naval District in southern New England, Doris B. III performed patrol duty for the rest of World War I.

Doris B. III was decommissioned after the end of the war and returned to Jewett on 3 December 1918.
