= USS Darter =

USS Darter has been the name of more than one United States Navy ship, and may refer to:

- USS Darter (SS-227), a submarine commissioned in 1943 and wrecked in 1944
- USS Darter (SS-576), a submarine in commission from 1956 to 1989
