= USCGC Escanaba =

Three United States Coast Guard Cutters have been named Escanaba:

- USCGC Escanaba (WPG-77), commissioned in 1932 and sunk in 1943 during the Battle of the Atlantic.
- USCGC Escanaba (WHEC-64), commissioned in 1946 and scrapped in 1974.
- USCGC Escanaba (WMEC-907), commissioned in 1987 and currently active.
