= USS Edison =

USS Edison may refer to the following ships of the United States Navy:

- USS Edison (DD-439), a United States Navy destroyer
- USS Thomas A. Edison (SSBN-610), a U.S. Navy ballistic-missile submarine

== See also ==
- USS Edson (DD-946), a U.S. Navy destroyer
