= USS Dlonra =

Patrol vessel of the United States Navy

History

United States
- Name: USS Dlonra
- Namesake: Previous name retained
- Acquired: 1917
- Commissioned: 1917
- Notes: In use as private motorboat prior to 1917

General characteristics
- Type: Patrol vessel

USS Dlonra (SP-66) was an armed motorboat that served in the United States Navy as a patrol vessel from 1917 until after the end of World War I.

Little is known about Dlonra. She was a private motorboat of the same name when the U.S. Navy acquired her for World War I service as a patrol vessel in 1917 and commissioned her as USS Dlonra (SP-66).

Dlonra was attached to the 1st Naval District and performed patrol duty in the area of Portland, Maine. In 1918 she was shipped to France where for the remainder of the war she served as a transport tender.

Records of Dlonra's status after the end of World War I on 11 November 1918 are lacking. Presumably she was decommissioned and disposed of—perhaps sold or returned to her owner—in late 1918 or 1919, as was the case with most of the many private craft that went into U.S. Navy service as patrol boats during World War I.
