= USS Ferret =

USS Ferret may refer to the following ships of the United States Navy:

- USS Ferret (1806) was a brig commissioned in 1809; changed names to Viper in 1810 and served until captured in 1813.
- USS Ferret (1812) was a schooner commissioned in 1812 serving until she grounded and broke up in 1814.
- USS Ferret (1822) was a schooner purchased in 1822 that suppressed piracy in the Caribbean until 1825 when she capsized in a gale.
