= USS Deane =

USS Deane has been the name of more than one ship in the United States Navy.

- USS Deane (1778) was a Continental Navy frigate commissioned in 1778.
- USS Deane (DE-86), a Buckley-class destroyer escort, was never commissioned in the United States Navy. Instead it was commissioned in the Royal Navy as HMS Deane (K551) in 1943.
