= USS Egret =

USS Egret is a name used more than once by the U.S. Navy:

- USS Egret (AMc-24), a coastal minesweeper was placed in service 10 June 1941
- USS Egret (YMS-136), named 19 August 1947
