= USS Effective =

USS Effective may refer to:

- USS Effective (AM-92), was launched 13 June 1942, reclassified PC-1596, 1 June 1944 and decommissioned 9 November 1945.
- USNS Effective (T-AGOS-21), was launched 26 September 1991 and is currently in service.
