= USS Empire State =

USS Empire State may refer to:

- USS Empire State (IX-38), was Procyon (AG-11), renamed for use as a training ship
- USS Empire State (AP-1001), a training ship launched in 1961
