= USS Energy =

USS Energy is a name used more than once by the U.S. Navy:

- USS Energy (AMc-78), a coastal minesweeper commissioned 1 January 1942.
- USS Energy (AM-436), a fleet minesweeper commissioned 16 July 1954.
