= USS Dohema Jr. =

Patrol vessel of the United States Navy

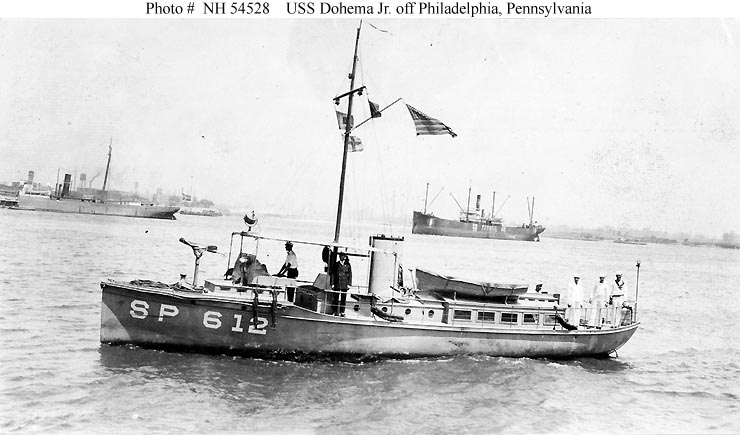
- USS Dohema Jr. (SP-612) off Philadelphia, Pennsylvania, during World War I. In the right background is the Swedish commercial cargo ship Hermes with World War I neutrality markings painted on her side.

History

United States
- Name: USS Dohema Jr.
- Namesake: Previous name retained
- Builder: Edwin Binney, Sound Beach, Connecticut
- Completed: 1912
- Acquired: 1917
- Commissioned: 2 June 1917
- Decommissioned: 27 November 1918
- Fate: Returned to owner 27 November 1918
- Notes: Operated as private motorboat Dohema Jr. 1912-1917 and from 1918

General characteristics
- Type: Patrol vessel
- Length: 57 ft (17 m)
- Beam: 12 ft (3.7 m)
- Draft: 4 ft 2 in (1.27 m)
- Speed: 11 knots
- Complement: 11
- Armament: 1 × 1-pounder gun

USS Dohema Jr. (SP-612) was a United States Navy patrol vessel in commission from 1917 to 1918.

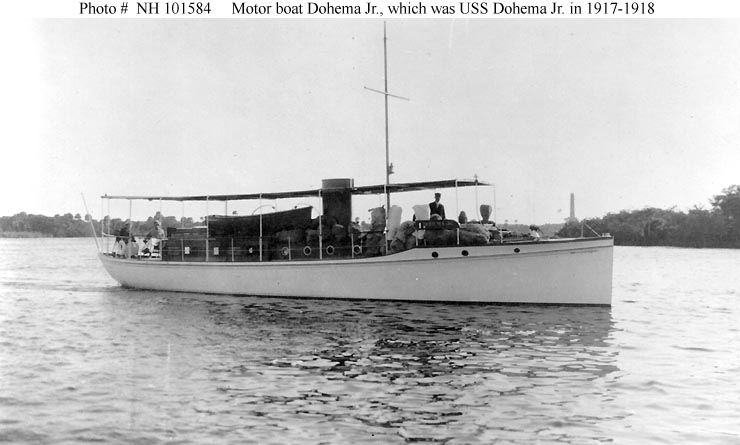
Dohema Jr. as a private motorboat sometime between 1912 and 1917.

Dohema Jr. was built as a private motorboat of the same name by her owner, Edwin Binney of Sound Beach, Connecticut, in 1912. In 1917, the U.S. Navy acquired her under a free lease from Binney for use as a section patrol boat during World War I. She was commissioned as USS Dohema Jr. (SP-612) on 2 June 1917.

Assigned to the 4th Naval District, Dohema Jr. performed patrol duty in the Delaware River and Delaware Bay and transported Navy personnel within the naval district for the rest of World War I.

Dohema Jr. was decommissioned on 27 November 1918 and returned to Binney the same day.
