= USS Fli-Hawk =

Patrol vessel of the United States Navy

History

United States
- Name: USS Fli-Hawk
- Namesake: Previous name retained
- Completed: 1912
- Acquired: 1917
- Commissioned: 12 May 1917
- Decommissioned: 8 February 1919
- Fate: Returned to owner 8 February 1919
- Notes: Operated as private motorboat or motor yachtFli-Hawk 1912-1917 and from 1919

General characteristics
- Type: Patrol vessel
- Tonnage: 35 gross register tons
- Length: 81 ft 5 in (24.82 m)
- Beam: 12 ft 1 in (3.68 m)
- Draft: 4 ft (1.2 m)
- Speed: 10 knots
- Complement: 13
- Armament: 1 × 1-pounder gun

USS Fli-Hawk (SP-550) was a United States Navy patrol vessel in commission from 1917 to 1919.

Fli-Hawk was built as a private motorboat or motor yacht of the same name in 1912. In 1917, the U.S. Navy acquired her under a free lease from her owner for use as a section patrol vessel during World War I. She was commissioned as USS Fli-Hawk (SP-550) on 12 May 1917.

Assigned to the 5th Naval District, Fli-Hawk operated on patrol duties in the Norfolk, Virginia, area for the rest of World War I.

On 31 December 1917, Fli-Hawk was getting underway when she collided with the steamer SS Gratitude in Norfolk Harbor. Fli-Hawk sank three hours later, but was raised, repaired, and returned to service.

Fli-Hawk was decommissioned on 8 February 1919 and returned to her owner.
