= USS Flasher =

USS Flasher has been the name of more than one United States Navy ship, and may refer to:

- USS Flasher (SS-249), a submarine in commission from 1943 to 1946
- USS Flasher (SSN-613), a submarine in commission from 1966 to 1992
