= USS Fearless (SP-724) =

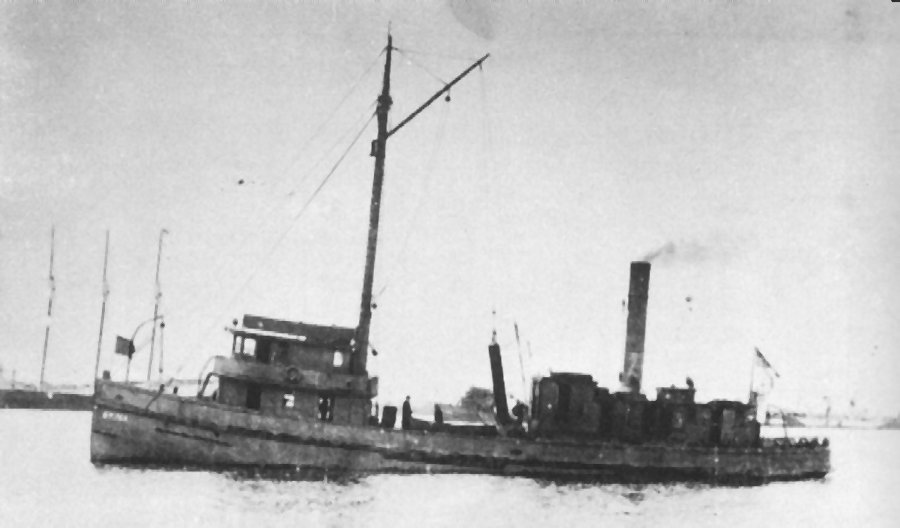
- USS Fearless (SP-724) underway.

History

United States
- Name: USS Fearless
- Namesake: Previous name retained
- Completed: 1877
- Acquired: 20 May 1917
- Commissioned: 1917
- Fate: Sold 30 September 1921
- Notes: Operated as commercial fishing trawler Fearless 1877-1917

General characteristics
- Type: Tug
- Tonnage: 121 Gross register tons
- Length: 103 ft (31 m)
- Beam: 16 ft 8 in (5.08 m)
- Draft: 7 ft 9 in (2.36 m)
- Propulsion: One vertical compound steam engine, one single-ended boiler, one shaft; 200 indicated horsepower (149 kilowatts)
- Speed: 7.8 knots

The first USS Fearless (SP-724) was a United States Navy tug in commission from 1917 to 1921.

Fearless was built as a commercial steam fishing trawler of the same name in 1877. On 20 May 1917, the U.S. Navy acquired her for use during World War I. Assigned the section patrol number 724, she was commissioned as USS Fearless (SP-724) in 1917.

Assigned to the 4th Naval District, Fearless served for the rest of World War I as a tug in the Philadelphia, Pennsylvania, area. She apparently remained in naval service after the end of the war.

Fearless was sold on 30 September 1921.
