= USS East Hampton =

Patrol vessel of the United States Navy

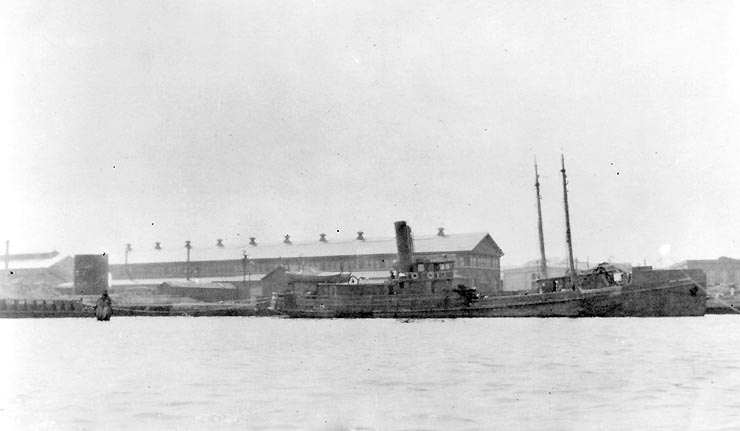
- East Hampton as a commercial trawler sometime between 1913 and 1917

History

United States
- Name: USS East Hampton
- Namesake: Previous name retained
- Builder: Cobb and Butler, Rockland, Maine
- Completed: 1913
- Acquired: 18 April 1917
- Commissioned: 8 May 1917
- Decommissioned: 2 December 1919
- Fate: Sold 14 June 1920
- Notes: Operated as commercial trawler East Hampton 1913–1917

General characteristics
- Type: Minesweeper and patrol vessel (1917–1919); Lightvessel (1919)
- Tonnage: 407 gross register tons
- Length: 162 ft 9 in (49.61 m)
- Beam: 26 ft 6 in (8.08 m)
- Propulsion: Steam engine
- Speed: 12 knots
- Complement: 37
- Armament: 1 × 3-pounder gun

USS East Hampton (SP-573) was a United States Navy minesweeper, patrol vessel, and lightvessel in commission from 1917 to 1919.

== History ==
East Hampton was built as a commercial steam trawler of the same name by Cobb and Butler at Rockland, Maine, in 1913. On 18 April 1917, the U.S. Navy purchased her from the Trident Fisheries Company of Portland, Maine, as a section patrol vessel and minesweeper during World War I. She was commissioned as USS East Hampton (SP-573) on 8 May 1917.

Assigned to the 1st Naval District in northern New England, East Hampton served on patrol, minesweeping, towing, and icebreaking duties. Between June and August 1918, she temporarily left those duties to escort U.S. Navy submarine chasers on voyages to Bermuda and the Azores, after which she resumed her operations in the 1st Naval District for the rest of World War I.

In January 1919, East Hampton was fitted out as a lightvessel, serving in that capacity at Middle Bank and Stillwagon Bank until May 1919.

East Hampton was decommissioned on 2 December 1919 and sold on 14 June 1920 to C.E. Davis Packing Company of Fleeton, Virginia.
