= USS Felicia =

USS Felicia is a name used more than once by the U.S. Navy:

- USS Felicia (SP-642), a yacht built in 1898 by J. N. Robins Co., Brooklyn, New York; purchased by the U.S. Navy 21 June 1917
- USS Felicia (PYc-35), built in 1931 by Bath Iron Works, Bath, Maine, and served during World War II as a patrol craft
