= USS Eleanor =

Patrol vessel of the United States Navy

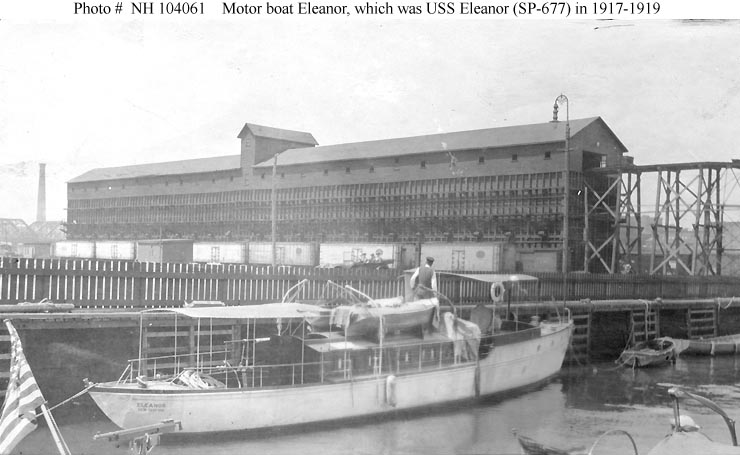
- Eleanor as a private motorboat, probably at the time of her delivery to the U.S. Navy in June 1917. Her name and home port (New Bedford, Massachusetts) are painted on her stern. A Colt machine gun mounted on an unidentified patrol boat is in the foreground. .

History

United States
- Name: USS Eleanor
- Namesake: Previous name retained
- Builder: Murray and Tregurtha, South Boston, Massachusetts
- Completed: 1910
- Acquired: June 1917
- Commissioned: 9 July 1917
- Decommissioned: 12 December 1918
- Fate: Returned to owner 14 April 1919
- Notes: Operated as private motorboat Tringa and Eleanor 1910–1917 and Eleanor from 1919

General characteristics
- Type: Patrol vessel
- Length: 58 ft (18 m)
- Beam: 11 ft 9 in (3.58 m)
- Draft: 4 ft 6 in (1.37 m)
- Speed: 10 knots
- Complement: 9
- Armament: 1 × 1-pounder gun

USS Eleanor (SP-677) was a United States Navy patrol vessel in commission from 1917 to 1918.

Eleanor was built as the private motorboat Tringa by Murray and Tregurtha at South Boston, Massachusetts, in 1910. She later was renamed Eleanor.

In June 1917, the U.S. Navy acquired Eleanor under a free lease from her owner, C. B. Houghton of Corning, New York, for use as a section patrol boat during World War I. She was commissioned as USS Eleanor (SP-677) on 9 July 1917.

Assigned to the 1st Naval District in northern New England, Eleanor carried out patrol duties in the Boston, Massachusetts, area through the end of World War I.

Eleanor was decommissioned on 12 December 1918 and returned to Houghton on 14 April 1919.
