= USS Enaj =

Patrol vessel of the United States Navy

History

United States
- Name: USS Enaj
- Namesake: Previous name retained
- Builder: Herreshoff Manufacturing Company, Bristol, Rhode Island
- Completed: 1909
- Acquired: 11 June 1917
- Commissioned: 11 June 1917
- Fate: Returned to owner 31 December 1918
- Notes: Operated as private yacht Enaj 1909-1917 and from 1919

General characteristics
- Type: Patrol vessel
- Tonnage: 92 gross register tons
- Length: 89 ft 4 in (27.23 m)
- Beam: 17 ft 8 in (5.38 m)
- Draft: 5 ft (1.5 m) forward
- Propulsion: One 75 indicated horsepower (55.9-kilowatt) steam engine, one shaft
- Speed: 11 knots
- Complement: 12

USS Enaj (SP-578) was a United States Navy patrol vessel in commission from 1917 to 1918.

Enaj was built as a private steam yacht of the same name by the Herreshoff Manufacturing Company at Bristol, Rhode Island, in 1909. On 11 June 1917, the U.S. Navy acquired her under a free lease from her owner for use as a section patrol vessel during World War I. She was commissioned the same day as USS Enaj (SP-578).

Assigned to the 2nd Naval District in southern New England, Enaj carried out patrols and executed special duty assignments with the Inspection Section at Newport, Rhode Island, for the rest of World War I.

Enaj was returned to her owner on 31 December 1918.
