= USS Ebert =

USS Ebert may refer to the following ships of the United States Navy:

- The name Ebert was assigned to DE-74 which was transferred under lend lease to the United Kingdom 13 October 1943 before commissioning. After service as HMS Bentley, she was returned to the United States after the war and sold 20 June 1947.
- USS Ebert (DE-768), was a Cannon-class destroyer escort commissioned 12 July 1944, escorted convoys in the Atlantic and Pacific during World War II and was transferred to Greece on 1 March 1951.
