= USS Exploit =

USS Exploit is a name that the U.S. Navy has used more than once in naming its vessels:

- USS Exploit (AM-95), was launched 7 September 1942 by Jakobson Shipyard, Inc., Oyster Bay, Long Island, New York.
- USS Exploit (AM-440), was launched 10 April 1953 by Higgins Industries Corp., New Orleans, Louisiana.
