= USS Elizabeth M. Froelich =

Minesweeper of the United States Navy

History

United States
- Name: USS Elizabeth M. Froelich
- Namesake: Previous name retained
- Acquired: 18 May 1917
- Commissioned: 18 May 1917
- Decommissioned: 14 April 1919 or 14 May 1919
- Fate: Returned to owner 14 April 1919 or 14 May 1919
- Notes: Operated as commercial freight boat Elizabeth M. Froelich until 1917 and from 1919

General characteristics
- Type: Minesweeper
- Length: 138 ft (42 m)
- Beam: 18 ft (5.5 m)
- Speed: 10 knots
- Complement: 28
- Armament: 1 × 6-pounder gun

USS Elizabeth M. Froelich (SP-380) was a minesweeper that served in the United States Navy from 1917 to 1919.

Elizabeth M. Froelich was built as a commercial freight boat of the same name. On 18 May 1917, the U.S. Navy acquired her at New York City from her owner for use on the section patrol as a minesweeper during World War I. She was commissioned as USS Elizabeth M. Froelich (SP-380) the same day.

After fitting out as a minesweeper, Elizabeth M. Froelich was assigned to the 5th Naval District, where she operated for the rest of World War I and into 1919. She was decommissioned and returned to her owner on the same day in 1919; sources differ as to whether the day was 14 April 1919 or 14 May 1919.
