= USS Evansville =

USS Evansville may refer to the following ships of the United States Navy:

- USS Evansville (ID-2996), was a cargo ship acquired by the Navy 24 December 1917 and decommissioned 23 August 1919
- USS Evansville (PF-70), was launched 27 November 1943 and served under lend lease to the USSR and transferred to Japan on 31 October 1953
