= USS Demand =

Minesweeper of the United States Navy

History

United States
- Name: Demand
- Laid down: 28 March 1941
- Launched: 22 May 1941
- In service: 5 September 1941
- Out of service: 1945
- Stricken: 5 December 1945
- Fate: Sold in 1946

General characteristics
- Displacement: 195 tons
- Length: 97 ft 1 in (29.59 m)
- Beam: 22 ft 0 in (6.71 m)
- Draught: 8.5 ft (2.6 m) (mean) (f.)
- Speed: 10.0 knots (19 km/h)
- Complement: 17
- Armament: two .50 cal (12.7 mm) machine guns

USS Demand (AMc-74) was an Accentor-class coastal minesweeper acquired by the U.S. Navy for the dangerous task of removing mines from minefields laid in the water to prevent ships from passing.

== Construction and career ==
Demand was launched by the Gibbs Gas Engine Co., Jacksonville, Florida, on 22 May 1941. She was placed in service on 5 September 1941 for duty in the 3d Naval District and in the 6th Naval District. Demand was stricken from the Navy List on 5 December 1945.
