= USS Damon Cummings =

USS Damon Cummings may refer to more than one United States Navy ship:

- USS Damon Cummings (DE-756), a destroyer escort cancelled in 1943
- USS Damon M. Cummings (DE-643), a destroyer escort in commission from 1944 to 1947

== See also ==
- USS Cummings
