= USS Express No. 4 =

Patrol vessel of the United States Navy

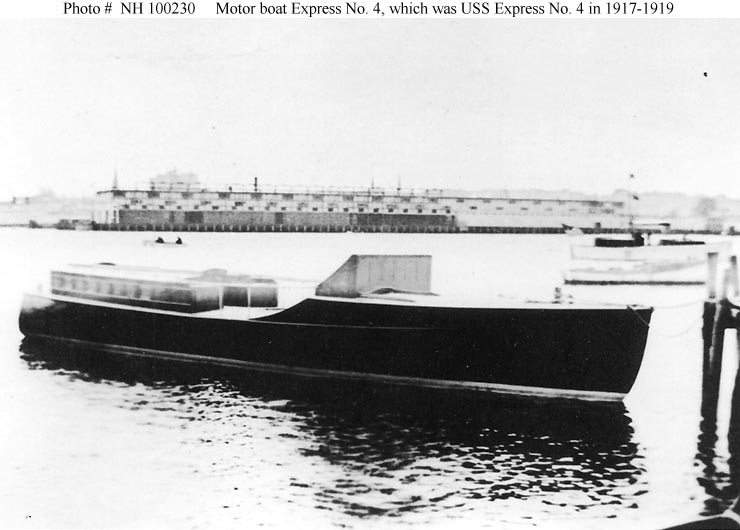
- Express No. 4 as a private motorboat at the time of her completion in 1917.

History

United States
- Name: USS Express No. 4
- Namesake: Previous name retained
- Builder: C. F. Ferguson, Groton, Connecticut
- Completed: 1917
- Acquired: 2 July 1917
- Commissioned: 2 July 1917
- Stricken: 23 January 1919
- Fate: Returned to owner January 1919
- Notes: Operated as private motorboat Express No. 4 from 1919

General characteristics
- Type: Patrol vessel
- Length: 46 ft (14 m)
- Beam: 9 ft (2.7 m)
- Draft: 2 ft 3 in (0.69 m)
- Speed: 17 knots (31 km/h)
- Complement: 7
- Armament: 1 × 1-pounder gun

USS Express No. 4 (SP-745), sometimes written as Express # 4, was a United States Navy patrol vessel in commission from 1917 to 1919.

Express No. 4 was built as a private motorboat of the same name in 1917 by C. F. Ferguson at Groton, Connecticut. Upon her completion in early July 1917, the U.S. Navy leased her from her owner, M. F. Plant of Groton, for use as a section patrol boat during World War I. She was enrolled in the Naval Coast Defense Reserve and was commissioned on 2 July 1917 as USS Express No. 4 (SP-745).

Although assigned to the 2nd Naval District in southern New England, Express No. 4 operated on patrol duties along the United States East Coast as far south as Florida during World War I.

Decommissioned after the end of the war, Express No. 4 was stricken from the Navy List on 23 January 1919 and returned to Plant.
