= USS Flusser (1864) =

Cargo ship of the United States Navy

History

United States
- Name: USS Flusser
- Acquired: 1864
- In service: 1864
- Out of service: 1865
- Captured: by Union Navy forces in 1864
- Fate: sold, 23 September 1865

General characteristics
- Length: 66 ft (20 m)
- Propulsion: Sail

USS Flusser was a schooner captured by the Union Navy during the American Civil War.

She was used by the Union Navy as a storeship whose duty was to supply other Union Navy ships with coal, ammunition, and other necessary provisions.

== Service history ==
Flusser—a 66 ft (20 m) schooner captured from the Confederates in 1864 but never labeled as a prize—was used as a coal hulk and to carry ordnance and stores to ships in the North Carolina sounds. Flusser was sold at Washington, D.C. on 23 September 1865.
