= USS Didrickson Bay =

USS Didrickson Bay refers to one of two ships of the United States Navy named for Didrickson Bay in Alaska:

- USS Didrickson Bay (CVE-64), a Casablanca-class escort carrier that was renamed USS Tripoli before being launched
- USS Didrickson Bay (CVE-100), a second Casablanca-class escort carrier that was renamed USS Bougainville, also before being launched
