= USS Eversole =

USS Eversole may refer to:

- USS Eversole (DE-404), was a John C. Butler-class destroyer escort commissioned 21 March 1944 and sunk at Leyte Gulf on 28 October 1944
- USS Eversole (DD-789), was a Gearing-class destroyer launched 8 January 1946 and finally transferred to Turkey, 11 July 1973
