= USS Delta =

USS Delta may refer to the following ships of the United States Navy:

- USS Delta (1864), a steam tug for the United States Navy during the American Civil War
- USS Delta (AR-9), originally a cargo ship for the United States Navy during World War II; later converted to repair ship as lead ship of the Delta class
