= USS Elbour Bay =

USS Elbour Bay refers to one of two ships of the United States Navy named for Elbour Bay:

- USS Elbour Bay (ACV-66), Casablanca-class escort carrier renamed USS White Plains before being launched
- USS Elbour Bay (CVE-102), a second Casablanca-class escort carrier renamed USS Attu (CVE-102) before being laid down
