= USS Davis K. Philips =

Patrol vessel of the United States Navy

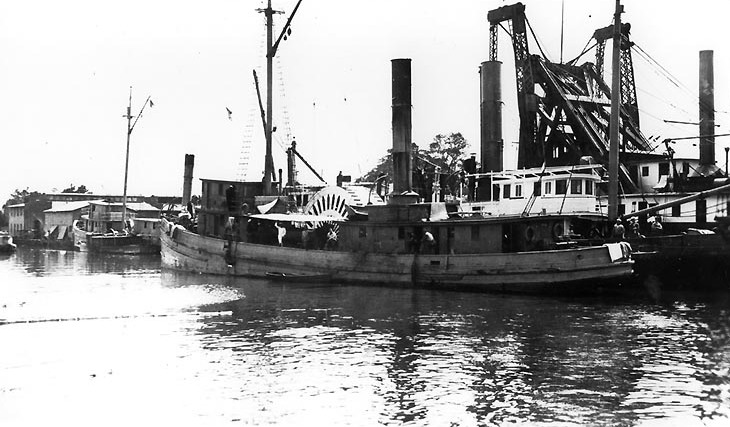
- Davis K. Philips (American Menhaden Fishing Vessel, 1877) In port, possibly while she was in U.S. Navy service. Several men in what appear to be enlisted working uniforms are on her decks and those of a nearby vessel.

History

United States
- Name: USS David K. Philips
- Namesake: Previous name retained
- Launched: 1877
- Acquired: 21 May 1917
- Out of service: 1919
- Stricken: 24 April 1919
- Home port: Norfolk, Virginia
- Fate: Sold

General characteristics
- Type: Patrol boat and harbor tug
- Length: 135 feet

USS David K. Philips (ID-978) was a United States Navy harbor tug during World War I.

David K. Philips was built in 1877. She was purchased by the Navy and placed in service on 21 May 1917. She was assigned to the 5th Naval District where she performed net patrol and harbor tug duties in the Norfolk, Virginia region throughout the war. She was stricken from the Navy List on 24 April 1919 and sold at Norfolk on 23 June 1919.

The boat operated as a private fishing vessel out of Reedsville, Va., through at least 1968.

Nothing more is known about David K. Philips
