= USS Dace =

USS Dace has been the name of more than one United States Navy ship, and may refer to:

- USS Dace (SS-247), a Gato-class submarine in commission in the USN from 1943 to 1947, from 1951 to 1954, and from 1954 to 1955; leased and transferred to Italian Navy in 1955 and returned in 1972 for scrapping (in 1975)
- USS Dace (SSN-607), a Thresher/Permit-class submarine in commission from 1964 to 1988; recycled 1997
