= USS Dash =

USS Dash is a name used more than once by the U.S. Navy in naming its ships:

- USS Dash (AM-88), was launched 20 June 1942 by Commercial Iron Works, Portland, Oregon.
- USS Dash (AM-428), was launched 20 September 1952 by Astoria Marine Construction Co., Astoria, Oregon.
