= USS Edith M. III =

Patrol vessel of the United States Navy

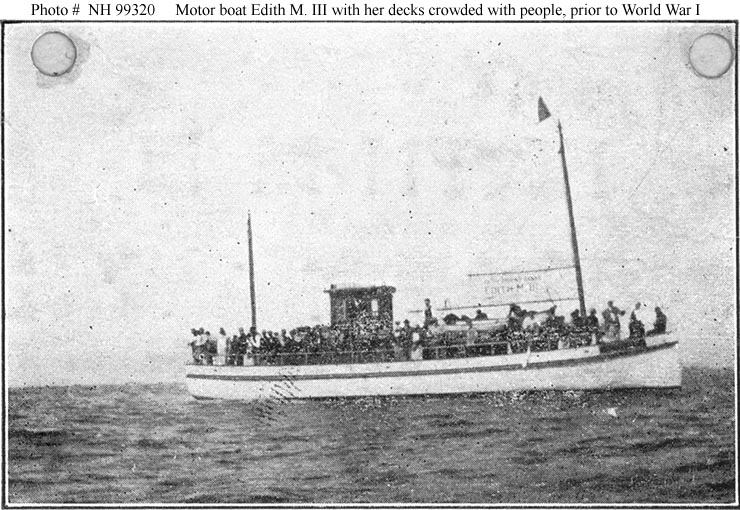
- Edith M. III in civilian use sometime between 1909 and 1917.

History

United States
- Name: USS Edith M. III
- Namesake: Previous name retained
- Builder: V. J. Osborn, Croton-on-Hudson, New York
- Launched: 1909
- Acquired: June 1917
- Commissioned: 5 November 1917
- Decommissioned: 8 May 1919
- Fate: Sold 2 July 1919

General characteristics
- Type: Patrol vessel
- Length: 59 ft (18 m)
- Beam: 15 ft 6 in (4.72 m)
- Draft: 4 ft 6 in (1.37 m)
- Speed: 9 knots (17 km/h; 10 mph)
- Complement: 11
- Armament: 1 × 1-pounder gun

USS Edith M. III (SP-196) was a United States Navy patrol vessel in commission from 1917 to 1919.

Edith M. III was built by V. J. Osborn at Croton-on-Hudson, New York, as a civilian motorboat of the same name in 1909. The United States Navy purchased her for World War I service in June 1917 and commissioned her on 5 November 1917 as USS Edith M. III' (SP-196).

Edith M. III was assigned to the 3rd Naval District, where she spent the remainder of World War I carrying men and provisions around New York Harbor.

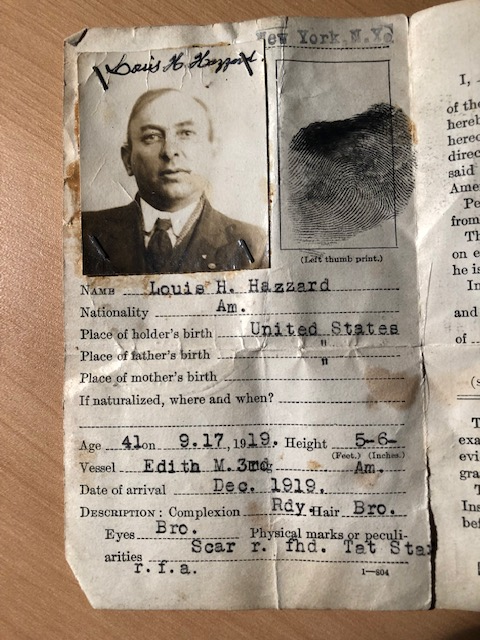
Citizen Seaman's Identification Card issued in 1920 to Louis H. Hazzard of the Edith M. III

Decommissioned on 8 May 1919, Edith M. III was sold on 2 July 1919 and entered passenger service in New York Harbor captained by Louis H. Hazzard.
