= USS Electron =

Cargo ship of the United States Navy

History

United States
- Name: USS Electron
- Namesake: A very light particle associated with the elementary charge of negative electricity
- Builder: Bethlehem Hingham Shipyard, Hingham, Massachusetts
- Laid down: 8 February 1945
- Launched: 9 March 1945
- Commissioned: 5 April 1945 as USS LST-1070
- Decommissioned: 3 December 1946, at Astoria, Oregon
- In service: 6 October 1950 as USS Electron (AG-146)
- Out of service: 16 November 1956
- Renamed: Electron, 1 February 1949
- Reclassified: AG-146 Electronics Parts Issue Ship, 27 January 1947; General Store Issues Ship (AKS-27), 18 August 1951
- Stricken: 1 April 1960
- Honors and awards: one battle star for Korean War service
- Fate: Sold, December 1960

General characteristics
- Type: LST 542-class tank landing ship
- Displacement: 1,625 tons
- Length: 328 ft (100 m)
- Beam: 50 ft (15 m)
- Draft: (sea-going) 8 ft 3 in (2.51 m) forward, 14 ft 1 in (4.29 m) aft
- Propulsion: two General Motors 12-567, 900hp diesel engines, two shafts, twin rudders
- Speed: 12 knots
- Endurance: 24,000 miles
- Capacity: between 1600 and 1900 tons
- Complement: 7 officers, 104 enlisted
- Armament: two twin 40 mm gun mounts w/Mk. 51 directors; four Single 40 mm gun mounts; twelve single 20 mm gun mounts

USS Electron (AG-146/AKS-27) -- also known as USS LST-1070 – was an LST-542-class tank landing ship launched by the U.S. Navy, with LT. Richard P. Seem at the helm, during the final months of World War II. Electron served as both a cargo ship and as an electronic parts supply ship for the U.S. Pacific Fleet and was decommissioned following the Korean War.

== Constructed at Hingham, Massachusetts ==
LST-1070 was launched 9 March 1945 by Bethlehem-Hingham Shipyard, Hingham, Massachusetts; and commissioned 5 April 1945.

== World War II-related service ==
Sailing from New York City 19 May 1945, LST-1070 arrived in the Philippines 14 July and, except for one voyage to Tokyo Bay to carry occupation cargo, operated there until October.

She shifted to Japan briefly, then returned to Pearl Harbor 6 December to begin conversion to an electronics parts issue ship. In 1946 her conversion was halted and she sailed to the U.S. West Coast where she was placed out of commission in reserve 3 December at Astoria, Oregon She was reclassified AG-146, 27 January 1949, and assigned the name Electron, 1 February 1949.

== Korean War service ==
Recommissioned 6 October 1950 as a result of the Korean War, Electron, with alterations completed at Bremerton, Washington, loaded electronic equipment at Oakland, California, for issue to the fleet.

She sailed from San Diego, California, 2 December for the Far East, arriving at Sasebo, Japan, 5 February 1951. She operated from this port and Yokosuka for the remainder of the Korean war, supplying and supporting Allied forces in the Far East during which time she was reclassified AKS-27 on 18 August 1951.

She remained in this duty after the war, and from 18 January 1955 to 30 April 1955 was stationed at Subic Bay. She returned to the U.S. West Coast in April 1956, and was again placed out of commission in reserve 16 November 1956.

== Post-war disposal ==
Electron was stricken from the Navy List 1 April 1960 and sold in December 1960.

== Honors and awards ==
Electron was awarded one battle star for Korean War service:

- First UN Counter Offensive (29 to 30 March 1951 and 16 to 18 April 1951).
