= USS Eclipse =

United States Navy patrol vessel

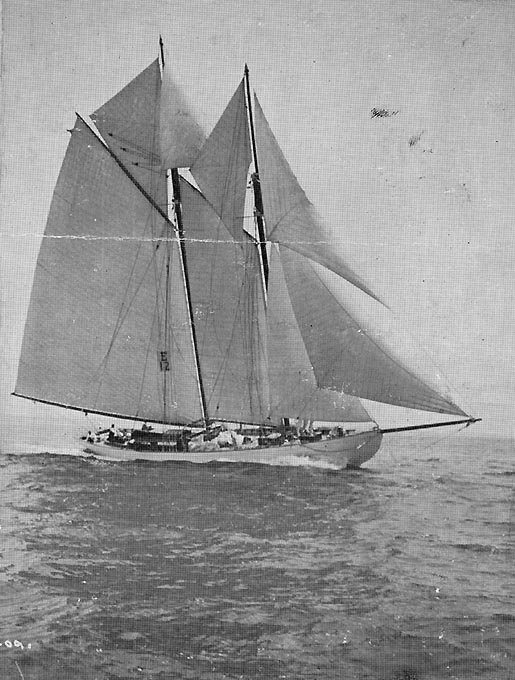
- Eclipse in civilian use sometime between 1906 and 1917.

History

United States
- Name: USS Eclipse
- Namesake: Previous name retained
- Builder: Bishops, Gloucester, Massachusetts
- Completed: 1906
- Acquired: 31 August 1917
- Commissioned: 31 August 1917
- Fate: Returned to owner 6 January 1919
- Notes: Operated as private schooner Eclipse 1906-1917 and from 1919

General characteristics
- Type: Patrol vessel
- Length: 84 ft (26 m)
- Beam: 19 ft 11 in (6.07 m)
- Draft: 12 ft (3.7 m) aft
- Propulsion: Sails plus auxiliary gasoline engine, one shaft
- Sail plan: Schooner-rigged
- Speed: 7 knots
- Complement: 14
- Armament: 1 × 3-pounder gun

USS Eclipse (SP-417) was a United States Navy patrol vessel in commission from 1917 to 1919.

Eclipse was built as a private motor schooner of the same name in 1906 by Bishops at Gloucester, Massachusetts. On 31 August 1917, the U.S. Navy acquired her under a free lease from her owner, Frank W. Spencer of Savannah, Georgia, for use as a section patrol vessel during World War I. She was commissioned the same day as USS Eclipse (SP-417).

Assigned to the 6th Naval District, Eclipse was based at Savannah, where she served as a pilot boat and guard ship for the remainder of World War I.

Eclipse was returned to her owner on 6 January 1919 after the close of the First World War.
