= USS Farquhar =

USS Farquhar may refer to the following ships operated by the United States Navy:

- USS Farquhar (DD-304) was a destroyer, commissioned in 1920 and decommissioned in 1930.
- USS Farquhar (DE-139) was a destroyer escort, commissioned in 1943 and decommissioned in 1946.
