= USS Eastport =

Two ships of the United States Navy have been named Eastport:

- USS Eastport (1862), was a partially completed ironclad, captured from the Confederates on 7 February 1862 and scuttled on 26 April 1864.
- USS Eastport (ID-3342), was commissioned 18 October 1918, transported cargo during World War I and was decommissioned 19 June 1919.
