= USS Euhaw =

History

United States
- Acquired: 1942
- In service: 13 October 1942
- Stricken: 28 June 1944
- Fate: Returned to the WSA

General characteristics
- Notes: International Radio Call Sign – NZDB

USS Euhaw (IX-85), an unclassified miscellaneous vessel, was the only ship of the United States Navy to be named for the Euhaw tribe of Native Americans in the United States.

Formerly known as Mayhap, she was acquired by the Navy in 1942 and placed in service in the 7th Naval District on 13 October of that year. She was stricken from the Naval Vessel Register on 28 June 1944 and transferred to the War Shipping Administration for disposal.

== Awards & Citations ==
The ship was awarded the American Campaign Medal and the World War II Victory Medal.
