= USS Delphinus =

USS Delphinus has been the name of two ships of the United States Navy, named after Delphinus, a northern constellation.

- USS Delphinus (AF-24), a transport launched in 1915 as San Mateo; purchased by the U.S. Navy in 1942 and renamed; decommissioned, 1946.
- USS Delphinus (PHM-1), was renamed Pegasus, the lead ship of the Pegasus class of patrol hydrofoils; launched, 1974; sold, 1996.
