= USS Doris B. IV =

Patrol vessel of the United States Navy

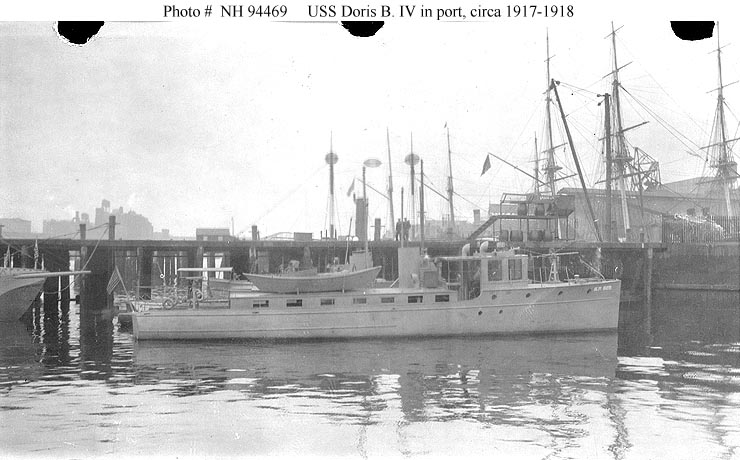
- USS Doris B. IV (SP-625) sometime between 1917 and 1919, probably at the Boston Navy Yard in Boston, Massachusetts, with the masts of USS Constitution in the right background.

History

United States
- Name: USS Doris B. IV
- Namesake: Previous name retained
- Builder: Britt Brothers, Lynn, Massachusetts
- Completed: 1917
- Acquired: April 1917
- Commissioned: 12 May 1917
- Decommissioned: 31 January 1919
- Fate: Transferred to U.S. Department of the Treasury 21 November 1919
- Notes: Operated as private motorboat Doris B. IV in 1917

General characteristics
- Type: Patrol vessel
- Length: 67 ft (20 m)
- Beam: 13 ft 4 in (4.06 m)
- Draft: 5 ft (1.5 m)
- Speed: 17 knots
- Complement: 10
- Armament: 1 × 1-pounder gun

USS Doris B. IV (SP-625) was a United States Navy patrol vessel in commission from 1917 to 1919.

== Background ==
Doris B. IV was built as a private motorboat of the same name by Britt Brothers at Lynn, Massachusetts, in 1917. In April 1917, the U.S. Navy acquired her for use as a section patrol boat during World War I. She was commissioned as USS Doris B. IV (SP-625) on 12 May 1917.

Assigned to the 1st Naval District in northern New England, Doris B. IV performed patrol duty for the rest of World War I.

Doris B. IV was decommissioned at Boston, Massachusetts, on 31 January 1919 and transferred to the United States Department of the Treasury on 21 November 1919.
