= USS Engineer =

Two ships of the United States Navy have been named USS Engineer:

- Engineer was a side wheel steamer, purchased at Baltimore, Maryland, in 1836. She was used as a tug and dispatch boat at the Norfolk Navy Yard and in 1839 and 1842 performed survey duty. In 1857 Engineer was condemned by survey and on 13 April ordered sold at public auction.
- USS Engineer (YFB-12), was a seagoing tug renamed San Felipe on 1 November 1922.
