= USS Dana =

USS Dana is a name used more than once by the United States Navy:

- USS Dana was a Coast Survey schooner taken over for the Navy by Commander James H. Ward of the Potomac Flotilla on 10 June 1861. Under the command of Acting Master's Mate R. B. Ely, she was used as a guard and convoy ship and a coal depot in the Potomac River until July 1862 when she was sent to Philadelphia for disposal.
- USS Dana, a steam lighter, served in a noncommissioned status in the 3d Naval District during World War I.
