= USS Force =

USS Force is a name used more than once by the U.S. Navy in naming its ships:

- USS Force (AM-99), was laid down 19 November 1941 by the Penn-Jersey Shipbuilding Corp., Camden, New Jersey
- USS Force (AM-445), was launched 26 June 1953 by J. M. Martinac Shipbuilding Corp., Tacoma, Washington
