= USS Doloma =

Patrol vessel of the United States Navy

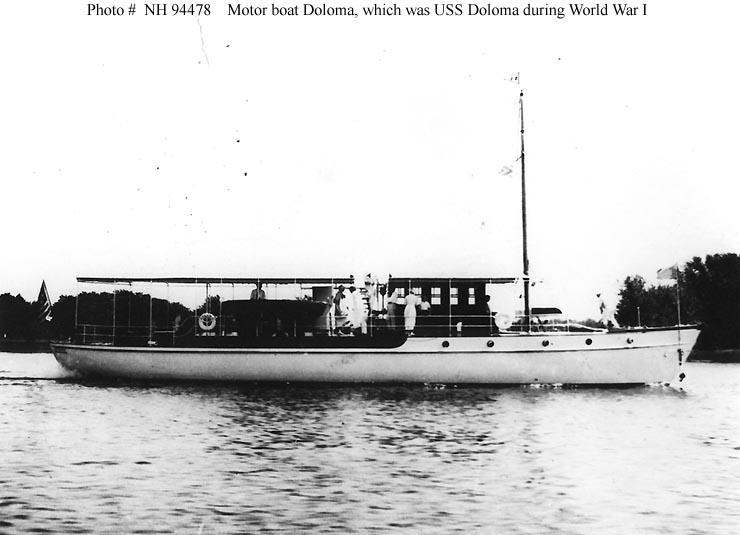
- Doloma as a private motorboat sometime between 1907 and 1917.

History

United States
- Name: USS Doloma
- Namesake: Previous name retained
- Completed: 1907
- Acquired: 1917
- Commissioned: 28 May or 26 July 1917
- Fate: Returned to owner either by 31 December 1918 or on 4 March 1919
- Notes: Operated as private motorboat Doloma 1907-1917 and from 1919

General characteristics
- Type: Patrol vessel
- Length: 75 ft (23 m)

USS Doloma (SP-1062) was a United States Navy patrol vessel in commission from 1917 until 1918 or 1919.

Doloma was built as a private motorboat of the same name in 1907. In 1917, the U.S. Navy acquired her either under a free lease or a US$1.00-per-month lease from her owner, A. Hompe of Grand Rapids, Michigan, for use as a section patrol boat during World War I. She was commissioned on either 28 May or 26 July 1917 as USS Doloma (SP-1062).

Assigned to the 9th Naval District, Doloma served on patrol duties on the Great Lakes for the rest of World War I, although her service was limited.

Doloma was returned to Hompe after the war. Her return date is unclear; sources claim both that the Commandant, 9th Naval District, reported on 31 December 1918 that she had been returned to Hompe and that she was returned to him on 4 March 1919.
