= USS Fortify =

USS Fortifiy may refer to the following ships operated or ordered by the United States Navy:

- The construction of Fortify (AM-237) was canceled on 6 June 1944
- USS Fortify (AM-446), was a minesweeper launched 14 February 1953 and decommissioned 31 August 1992
