= Folly (SP-1453) =

World War I sailing schooner

History

United States
- Name: Folly
- Namesake: Previous name retained
- Completed: 1884
- Acquired: 1917
- Fate: Left U.S. Navy service 1918
- Notes: Served as civilian schooner Folly 1884-1917 (Before Navy service)

General characteristics
- Type: Patrol vessel
- Propulsion: Sails

Folly (SP-1453) was a sailing schooner that served in the United States Navy as a patrol vessel during World War I.

Folly served on section patrol duties in the 5th Naval District in a non-commissioned status during the period the United States participated in the war.
