= USS Flambeau =

USS Flambeau is a name used more than once by the U.S. Navy:

- USS Flambeau (1814), a brig, was purchased 3 December 1814
- USS Flambeau (1861), a Civil War steamer, commissioned 27 November 1861
- USS Flambeau (IX-192), a tanker, built in 1919 by Sun Shipbuilding and Drydock Co., Chester, Pennsylvania
