= USS Eastwind (IX-234) =

History

United States
- Acquired: April 1946
- Stricken: 27 October 1949
- Fate: Sold

USS Eastwind (IX-234), an unclassified miscellaneous vessel, was the only ship of the United States Navy to be given that name. The former German ocean racing yacht was taken over by the Navy in April 1946 arriving in the United States for assignment to the United States Naval Academy. Surveyed in 1949 and determined to be in excess of Navy needs, she was stricken from the Naval Vessel Register on 27 October 1949 and sold.
