= USS Ellis =

USS Ellis may refer to the following ships of the United States Navy:

- USS Ellis (1862), a gunboat of the Confederate Navy acquired by the US Navy in 1862; she was grounded and blown up that same year.
- USS Ellis (DD-154), Wickes-class destroyer launched in 1918. She served as a convoy escort in World War II and was sold in 1947.
