= USS Euphemia =

Patrol vessel of the United States Navy

History

United States
- Name: USS Euphemia
- Namesake: Previous name retained
- Completed: 1898
- Acquired: 1917
- Commissioned: 25 June 1917
- Stricken: 21 October 1919
- Fate: Sold 1920
- Notes: Operated as private motorboat Euphemia until 1917

General characteristics
- Type: Patrol vessel

USS Euphemia (SP-539) was a United States Navy patrol vessel in commission from 1917 to 1919.

Euphemia was built in 1898 as a private motorboat. In 1917, the U.S. Navy purchased her for use as a section patrol vessel during World War I. She was commissioned as USS Euphemia (SP-539) on 25 June 1917.

Assigned to the 1st Naval District, Euphemia operated on patrol duties in northern New England waters for the rest of World War I and into 1919.

Euphemia was stricken from the Navy List on 21 October 1919 and sold in 1920.
