= USS Elithro II =

Patrol vessel of the United States Navy

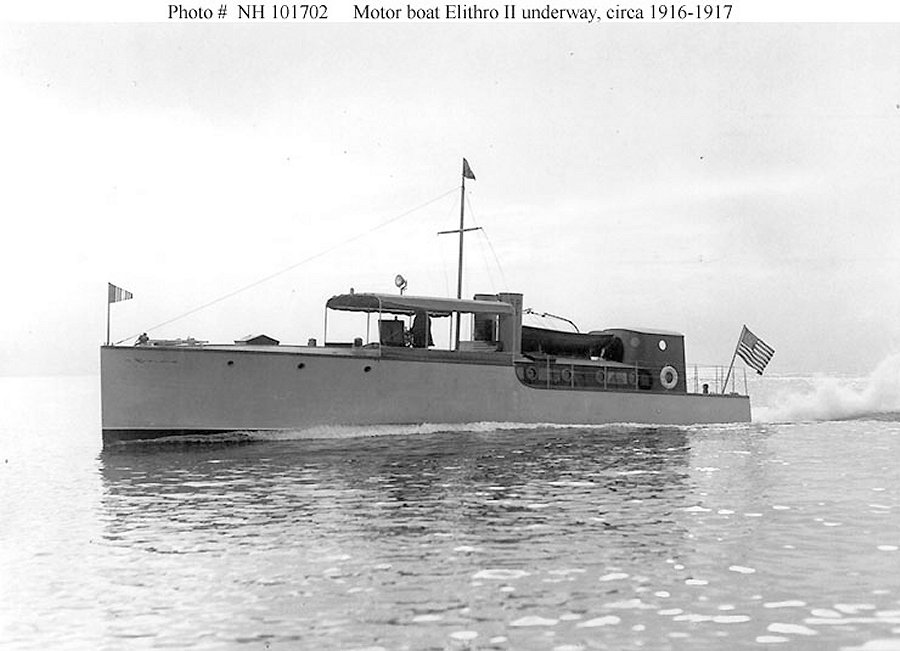
- Elithro II in 1916-1917, prior to her U.S. Navy service

History

United States
- Name: USS Elithro II
- Namesake: Previous name retained
- Builder: Luders Marine Construction Company, Stamford, Connecticut
- Completed: 1916
- Acquired: 10 November 1917
- Commissioned: 26 December 1917
- Fate: Returned to owner 18 December 1918
- Notes: Operated as private motorboat Elithro II 1916-1917 and from December 1918

General characteristics
- Type: Patrol vessel
- Length: 55 ft (17 m)

USS Elithro II (SP-15) was an armed motorboat that served in the United States Navy as a patrol vessel from 1917 to 1918.

Elithro II was built in 1916 by Luders Marine Construction Company at Stamford, Connecticut, as a private motorboat of the same name. She had two small funnels abreast amidships.

The U.S. Navy leased Elithro II from her owner, John Kelly Robinson of Rye (town), New York, on 10 November 1917 for World War I service. She was commissioned as USS Elithro II (SP-15) on 26 December 1917.

Elithro II performed intermittent plane guard duty at the Naval Coastal Air Station, Rockaway Beach, Long Island, New York, until returned to her owner on 18 December 1918.
