= USS Fashion =

US Navy freight lighter

History

United States
- Name: USS Fashion and USS Freight Lighter No. 116 (1918-1920); USS YF-116 (1920-1922)
- Namesake: Fashion was her previous name retained; YF-116 was her hull number
- Builder: Richard Rodermond, New York
- Completed: 1915
- Acquired: 1918
- Commissioned: 1918
- Decommissioned: 8 May 1922
- Renamed: USS Freight Lighter No. 116 sometime between 1918 and 1920; USS YF-116 17 July 1920
- Reclassified: YF-116 on 17 July 1920
- Fate: Sold 1922
- Notes: Operated as commercial barge Fashion 1915-1917

General characteristics
- Type: Freight lighter
- Displacement: 500 tons
- Length: 100 ft (30 m)
- Beam: 30 ft (9.1 m)
- Propulsion: Non-self-propelled

USS Fashion (ID-755), later USS Freight Lighter No. 116, later USS YF-116, was a United States Navy freight lighter in commission from 1918 to 1922.

Fashion was built as a commercial barge of the same name in 1915 by Richard Rodermond in New York. In 1918, the U.S. Navy acquired her from her owner, Eugene Coop of New York, for use during World War I. Assigned the naval registry identification number 755, he was placed in service in 1918 as USS Fashion (ID-755). She later was renamed USS Freight Lighter No. 116.

When the U.S. Navy adopted its modern hull number system on 17 July 1920, Freight Lighter No. 116 was classified as a YF (freight lighter) under the new system and renamed USS YF-116.

YF-116 was taken out of service on 8 May 1922. She was sold in 1922.
