= USS Exultant =

USS Exultant is a name used more than once by the U.S. Navy:

- USS Exultant (AMc-79), was a coastal minesweeper launched on 27 September 1941.
- USS Exultant (AM-441), was a minesweeper launched 6 June 1953.
