= USS Estero =

USS Estero may refer to the following ships of the United States Navy:

- USS Estero (CVE-42), was transferred to the Royal Navy and served as Premier.
- USS Estero (AG-134), originally served with the United States Army as FS-275, and was acquired by the Navy in March 1947.
