= USS Denebola =

USS Denebola is a name used more than once by the U.S. Navy:

- USS Denebola (AD-12), was built in 1919 as Edgewood by Skinner and Eddy, Seattle, Washington and commissioned 28 November 1921. She served in World War II and was decommissioned there 10 April 1946.
- USS Denebola (AF-56), was launched 10 June 1944 as Hibbing Victory by Oregon Shipbuilding Co., Portland, Oregon and commissioned in the Navy on 20 January 1954.
- USNS Denebola (T-AKR-289)
