= USS Firm =

Two ships of the United States Navy have been named Firm:

- USS Firm (AM-98), was redesignated PC-1602 on 1 June 1944
- USS Firm (AM-444), was launched 15 April 1953 and later redesignated MSO-444
