= USS Daraga =

Patrol vessel of the United States Navy

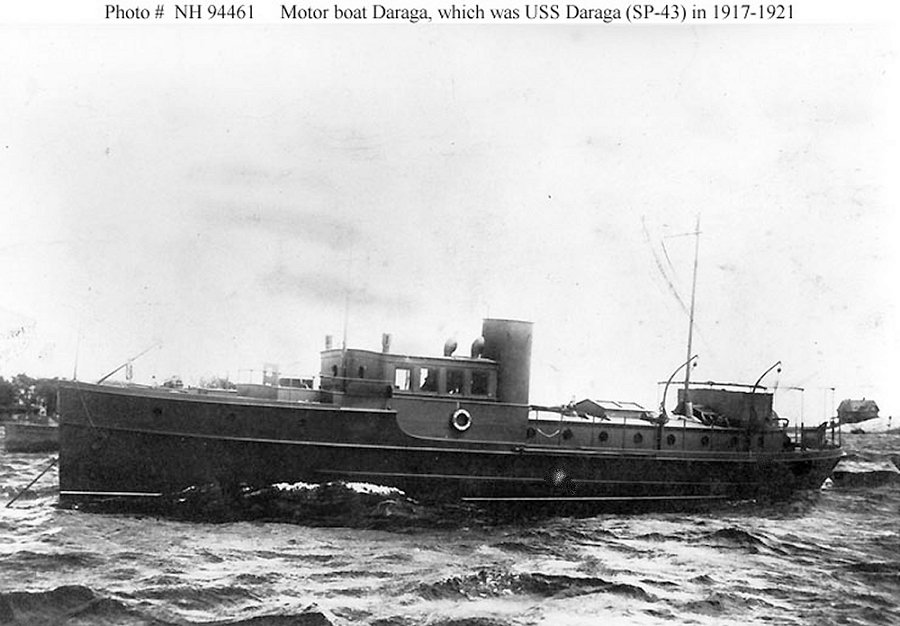
- Daraga in private use prior to her U.S. Navy service.

History

United States
- Name: USS Daraga
- Namesake: Previous name retained
- Completed: 1915
- Acquired: 1917
- Commissioned: 23 April 1917
- Decommissioned: 1919
- Stricken: 1919
- Fate: Sold 7 July 1921

General characteristics
- Type: Patrol boat
- Length: 77 ft 6 in (23.62 m)
- Beam: 17 ft (5.2 m)
- Draught: 3 ft 6 in (1.07 m)
- Speed: 10.0 knots (18.5 km/h)
- Complement: 15
- Armament: two 1-pounder guns

USS Daraga (SP-43) was a United States Navy patrol boat in commission from 1917 to 1919.

Daraga, a motorboat, was purchased by the Navy in 1917, commissioned on 23 April 1917 with Ensign A. F. Spare, USNRF, commanding.

Daraga was assigned to the 2nd Naval District where she performed harbor entrance patrol duty at Newport, Rhode Island, and served as mother ship to Patrol Squadron 1 until the end of World War I.

In 1919 Daraga was transferred to the 1st Naval District and decommissioned. She was sold on 7 July 1921.
