= USS Dominant =

USS Dominant is a name used more than once by the U.S. Navy:

- USS Dominant (AMc-76), was a coastal minesweeper laid down 9 April 1941 and struck from the Navy List on 1 May 1946.
- USS Dominant (AM-431), was a fleet minesweeper launched 5 November 1953 and decommissioned 1 October 1982.
