= USS Elf =

Patrol vessel of the United States Navy

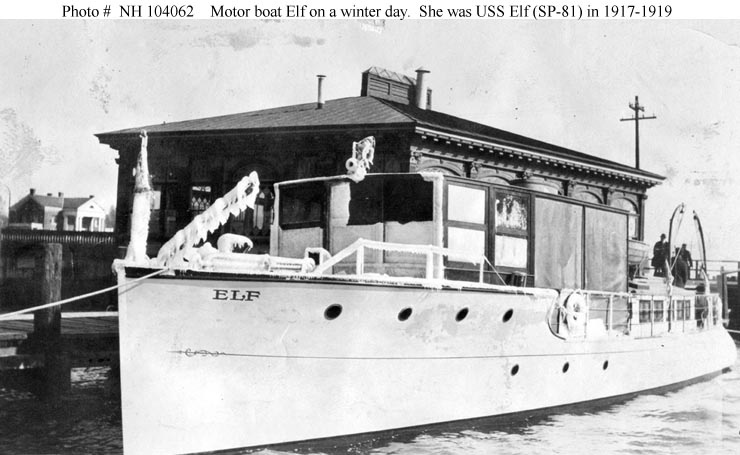
- Elf (SP-81) as a civilian motorboat on a winter day in early 1917, just after her completion and prior to her U.S. Navy service

History

United States
- Name: USS Elf
- Namesake: Previous name retained
- Builder: Stanley Vansant
- Completed: 1917
- Acquired: May 1917
- Commissioned: 3 May 1917
- Decommissioned: 9 January 1919
- Fate: Returned to owner 10 January 1919
- Notes: Operated as private motorboat Elf 1917 and from 1919

General characteristics
- Type: Patrol vessel
- Length: 53 ft (16 m)
- Beam: 12 ft (3.7 m)
- Draft: 3 ft (0.91 m) mean
- Speed: 22 knots
- Complement: 8
- Armament: 1 × 1-pounder gun

USS Elf (SP-81) was an armed motorboat that served in the United States Navy as a patrol vessel from 1917 to 1919.

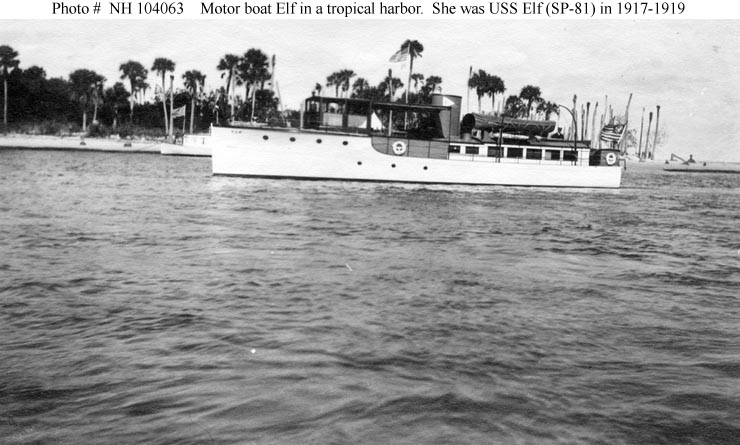
Elf in a tropical harbor as a private motorboat in early 1917, prior to her U.S. Navy service.

Elf was a civilian motorboat completed in early 1917 by Stanley Vansant. In early May 1917, the U.S. Navy acquired her under a free lease from her owner, Louis H. Eisenlohr of Philadelphia, Pennsylvania, for World War I service as a patrol boat. She was commissioned as USS Elf (SP-81) on 3 May 1917.

Elf performed patrol duty in the 4th Naval District until July 1918, when she was transferred to the 7th Naval District.

Elf was decommissioned on 9 January 1919 and returned to her owner on 10 January 1919.
