= USS Florence =

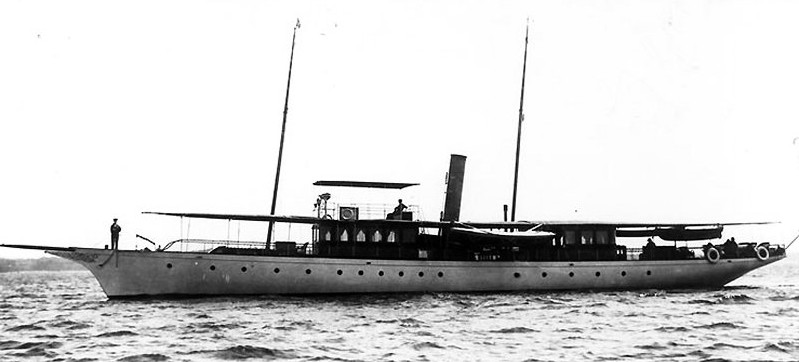
- Florence (American Steam Yacht, 1903) photographed prior to her World War I era Naval service.

History

United States
- Name: USS Florence
- Namesake: Name retained
- Owner: James W. Alker of New York City
- Builder: Herreshoff Manufacturing Company of Bristol, Rhode Island
- Laid down: date unknown
- Christened: as yacht Quickstep; later renamed Florence
- Completed: 1903
- Acquired: 28 April 1917
- Commissioned: 29 August 1917 as USS Florence (SP-173)
- Decommissioned: 22 February 1919
- Stricken: 22 February 1919
- Home port: New York City
- Fate: Returned to her owner

General characteristics
- Type: Yacht
- Tonnage: 104 gross tons
- Length: 124 ft (38 m)
- Beam: 18 ft 3 in (5.56 m)
- Draft: 5 ft 3 in (1.60 m)
- Propulsion: Steam engine
- Speed: 12 knots
- Complement: 17 officers and enlisted
- Armament: One 6-pounder gun; Two 3-pounder guns

USS Florence (SP-173) was a yacht leased from her owner by the U.S. Navy during World War I. She was outfitted as an armed patrol craft, and her owner, Ensign James W. Alker, was named as commanding officer of the yacht and its crew of sixteen. Florence, based out of New York City, was assigned various duties in the Long Island Sound. Post-war she was reconfigured to her original civilian condition, and was returned to her owner.

== A yacht built in Rhode Island ==
Florence (No. 173) was built by the Herreshoff Manufacturing Company of Bristol, Rhode Island, as the yacht Quickstep. She was free leased by the Navy for wartime service in late April 1917 and placed in commission on 29 August of that year as USS Florence (SP-173), commanded by her owner, Ensign James W. Alker, USNRF, of New York City.

== World War I service ==
Florence was assigned to the 3d Naval District for patrol duty in Long Island Sound. During 1918 she also conducted drills, acted as guardship, convoyed submarines out for operations, and set up target ranges for the ships of the fleet.

== Post-war decommissioning and disposal ==
On 22 February 1919 Florence was placed out of commission and returned to her owner.
