= USS Epervier =

USS Epervier has been the name of more than one United States Navy ship or proposed ship, and may refer to:

- USS Epervier (1814) was a British Cruizer-class brig-sloop that the US Navy captured in 1814 and that disappeared at sea in 1815.
- USS Epervier was a screw gunboat that the Secretary of the Navy authorized the construction of in November 1864 but which was never actually constructed.
