= USS Dianthus =

Patrol vessel of the United States Navy

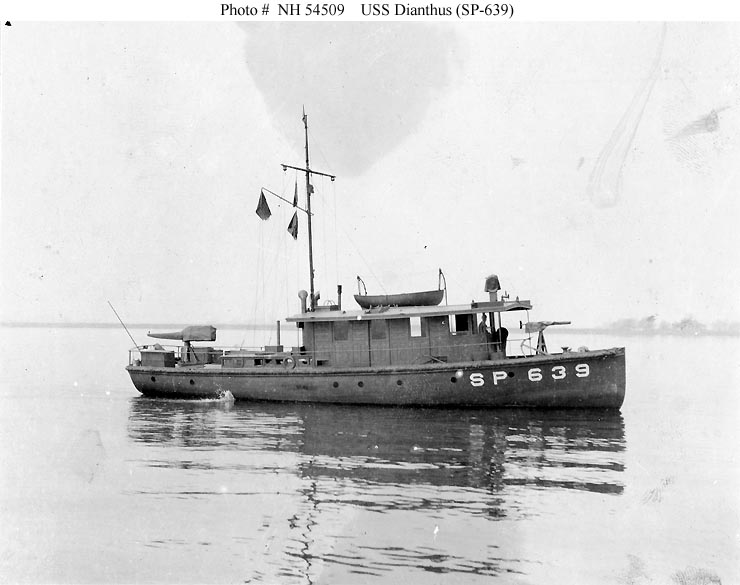
- USS Dianthus (SP-639) sometime in 1917 or 1918.

History

United States
- Name: USS Dianthus
- Namesake: Previous name retained
- Builder: Herreshoff Manufacturing Company, Bristol, Rhode Island
- Completed: 1913
- Acquired: 21 May 1917
- Commissioned: 26 May 1917
- Decommissioned: 27 November 1918
- Fate: Returned to owner 27 November 1918
- Notes: Operated as private motorboat Dianthus 1913–1917 and from 1918

General characteristics
- Type: Patrol vessel
- Length: 65 ft (20 m)
- Beam: 17 ft 4 in (5.28 m)
- Draft: 2 ft 9 in (0.84 m)
- Speed: 12 knots
- Complement: 16
- Armament: 1 × 3-pounder gun; 1 × 1-pounder gun

USS Dianthus (SP-639) was a United States Navy patrol vessel in commission from 1917 to 1918.

Dianthus was built as a private motorboat of the same name by the Herreshoff Manufacturing Company at Bristol, Rhode Island, in 1913. On 21 May 1917, the U.S. Navy acquired her under a free lease from her owner, John P. Crozer of Upland, Pennsylvania, for use as a section patrol boat during World War I. She was commissioned as USS Dianthus (SP-639) on 26 May 1917.

Assigned to the 4th Naval District, Dianthus performed patrol duty for the rest of World War I.

Dianthus was decommissioned on 27 November 1918 and returned to Crozer the same day.
