= USS De Soto =

USS De Soto is a name used more than once by the U.S. Navy:

- USS De Soto (1859) was a Navy steamer that served during the American Civil War and in the West Indies.
- USS De Soto (1860) was a riverboat that was renamed General Lyon on 24 October 1862.

== See also ==
- USS DeSoto County (LST-1171)
