= USS Edith II =

Patrol vessel of the United States Navy

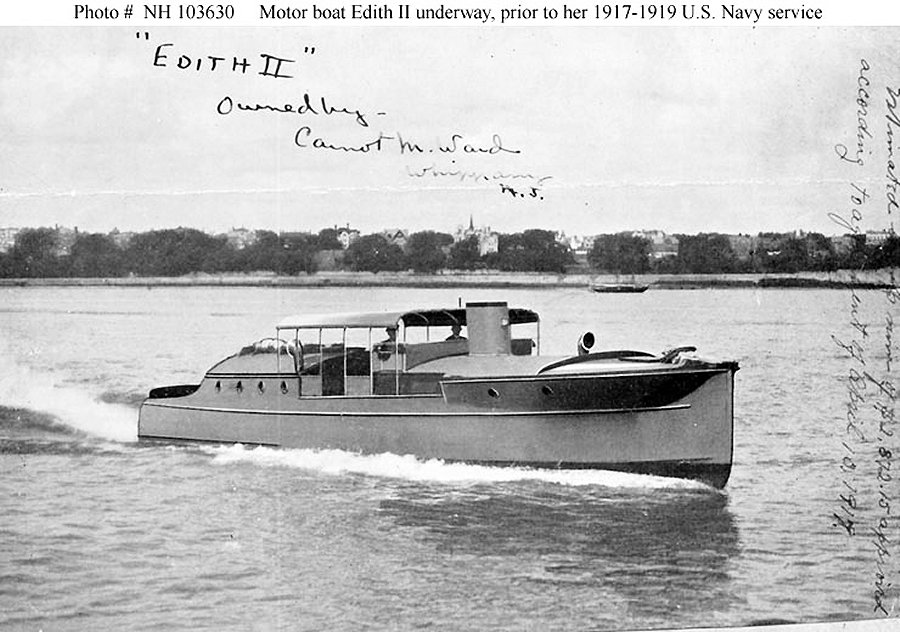
- Edith II in civilian use in 1917, prior to her U.S. Navy service.

History

United States
- Name: USS Edith II
- Namesake: Edith II was her previous name retained; SP-296 was her section patrol number
- Builder: Great Lakes Boat Building Corporation, Milwaukee, Wisconsin
- Completed: 1917
- Acquired: May 1917
- Commissioned: 1917
- Renamed: USS SP-296 in 1918
- Fate: Returned to owner early 1919

General characteristics
- Type: Patrol vessel
- Tonnage: 33 tons
- Length: 50 ft (15 m)
- Beam: 12 ft (3.7 m)
- Draft: 4 ft 6 in (1.37 m)
- Speed: 12 knots
- Complement: 11
- Armament: 2 × 3-pounder guns

USS Edith II (SP-296), later USS SP-296, was a United States Navy patrol vessel in commission from 1917 to 1919.

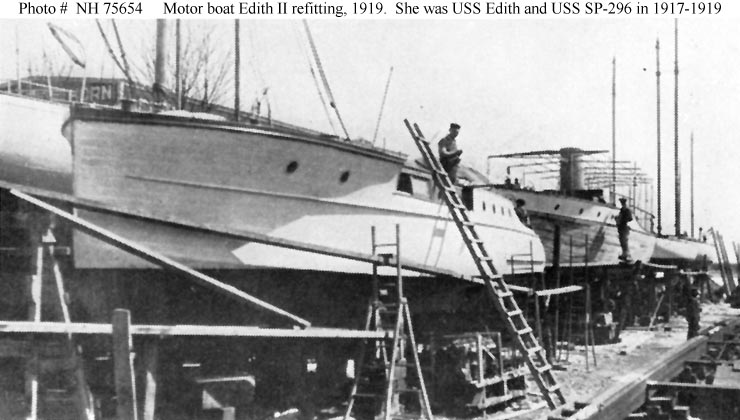
Edith II undergoing refit in the spring of 1919 at Nevins' Yacht Works at New York City after return to her owner following her U.S. Navy service.

Edith II was built by the Great Lakes Boat Building Corporation at Milwaukee, Wisconsin, as a civilian motorboat of the same name in 1917. The United States Navy acquired her from her owner, Carnot M. Ward of Whippany, New Jersey, in May 1917 for World War I service as a patrol vessel and commissioned her as USS Edith II (SP-296). In 1918, her name was changed to USS SP-296.

Edith II was returned to Ward in early 1919.
