= USS Emerald (1864) =

History

United States
- Name: USS Emerald
- Namesake: The emerald, a green gem stone
- Cost: $10,000 ($255,559.41 in 2020)
- Acquired: August 3, 1863
- In service: 1864
- Out of service: 1883

General characteristics
- Type: Ferry boat
- Propulsion: Steam engine

The first USS Emerald was steam yacht that served in a non-commissioned status as a ferry boat at the Portsmouth Navy Yard at Kittery, Maine, from 1864 to 1883.
