= USS East Boston =

American ferry/gunboat

History

United States
- Name: East Boston
- Launched: 1892
- Acquired: 2 June 1898
- Commissioned: 5 July 1898
- Decommissioned: 3 September 1898
- Fate: Sold, 19 July 1899

General characteristics
- Class & type: Gunboat
- Tonnage: GRT: 732 tons
- Displacement: 170 tons
- Length: 163 feet (50 m)
- Beam: 57 feet (17 m)
- Draft: 9.25 feet (2.82 m)
- Installed power: 500 indicated horsepower (370 kW)
- Propulsion: One compound engine; Several paddle wheels
- Speed: 9 knots (17 km/h; 10 mph)
- Complement: 58

USS East Boston was a US Navy paddle gunboat converted from a ferry during the Spanish-American War. She was launched in 1892 as the Bostonian ferry East Boston and was commissioned by the Navy for two months in 1898. She was found unfit for the Navy, and sold off in 1899.

== Design ==
Similar to her sister ship Governor Russell, East Boston was a wooden side-wheel ferry. She was 163 feet (50 m) long, had a beam of 57 feet (17 m), a draft of 9.25 feet (2.82 m), gross register tonnage of 732 tons, and had a crew of 58. She was powered by a compound engine that produced 500 indicated horsepower (370 kW) for a top speed of 9 knots (17 km/h; 10 mph).

== Service history ==
East Boston was a ferry built by Atlantic Works in Boston and launched in 1892 for the city government. On 2 June 1898, during the Spanish-American War, she was bought by the US Navy and commissioned on 5 July 1898 with the same name. The ship was converted into an auxiliary gunboat and fitted with two 47 mm (1.9 in) guns and assigned to the Boston Navy Yard. Shortly afterwards, she was inspected and condemned for naval service. She was decommissioned on 3 September 1898 and sold on 19 July 1899. Back in civilian service, she was renamed Norfolk County and was still in use by 1916.
