= USS Dicky =

Patrol vessel of the United States Navy

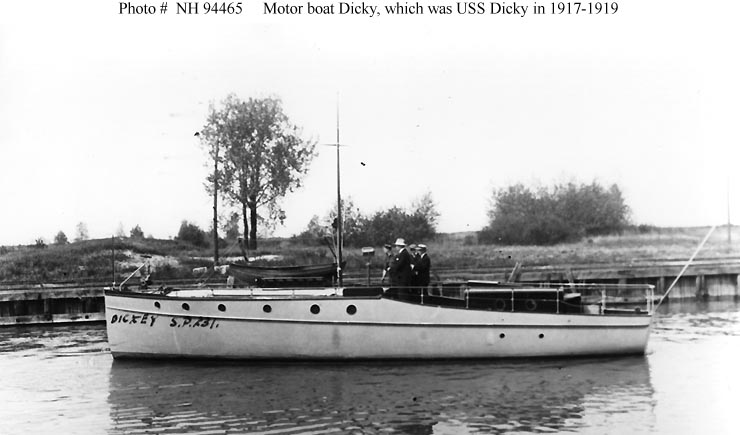
- Dicky as a civilian motorboat sometime between 1913 and 1917, prior to her U.S. Navy service..

History

United States
- Name: USS Dicky
- Namesake: Previous name retained
- Builder: Weckler Boat Company, Chicago, Illinois
- Completed: 1913
- Acquired: April 1917
- Commissioned: mid-June 1917
- Fate: Returned to owner 14 January 1919
- Notes: Operated as civilian motorboat Dicky 1913-1917 and from 1919

General characteristics
- Type: Patrol vessel
- Length: 46 ft (14 m)

USS Dicky (SP-231) was a United States Navy patrol vessel in commission from 1917 to 1919.

Dicky was built as a civilian motorboat of the same name in 1913 by the Weckler Boat Company at Chicago, Illinois. The U.S. Navy leased her from her owner, C.N. Steele of Waukegan, Illinois, in April 1917 for World War I service as a patrol vessel. She was commissioned in mid-June 1917 as USS Dicky (SP-231).

Dicky was assigned to the 9th Naval District for duty on the Great Lakes on the section patrol for the remainder of World War I.

Dicky was returned to Steele on 14 January 1919.
