= USS Elfin (SP-965) =

Patrol vessel of the United States Navy

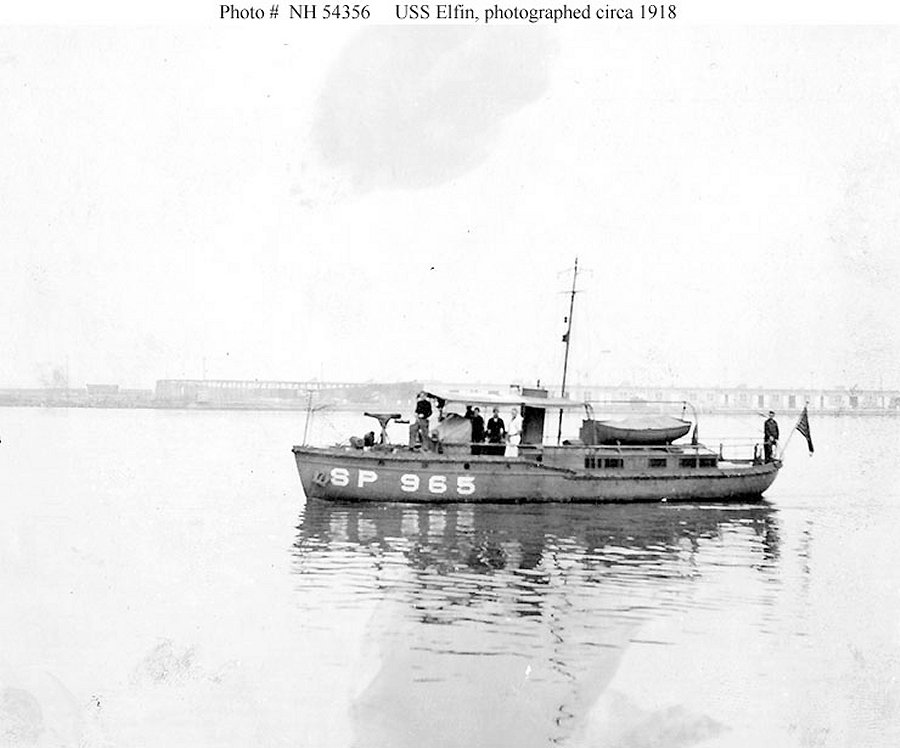
- USS Elfin (SP-965) operating ca. 1918.

History

United States
- Name: USS Elfin
- Namesake: Previous name retained
- Builder: Britt Brothers, Lynn, Massachusetts
- Completed: 1911
- Acquired: July 1917
- Commissioned: 26 July 1917
- Fate: Returned to owner 22 November 1918
- Notes: Operated as private motorboat Elfin 1911-1917 and from 1918

General characteristics
- Type: Patrol vessel
- Length: 50 ft 8 in (15.44 m)

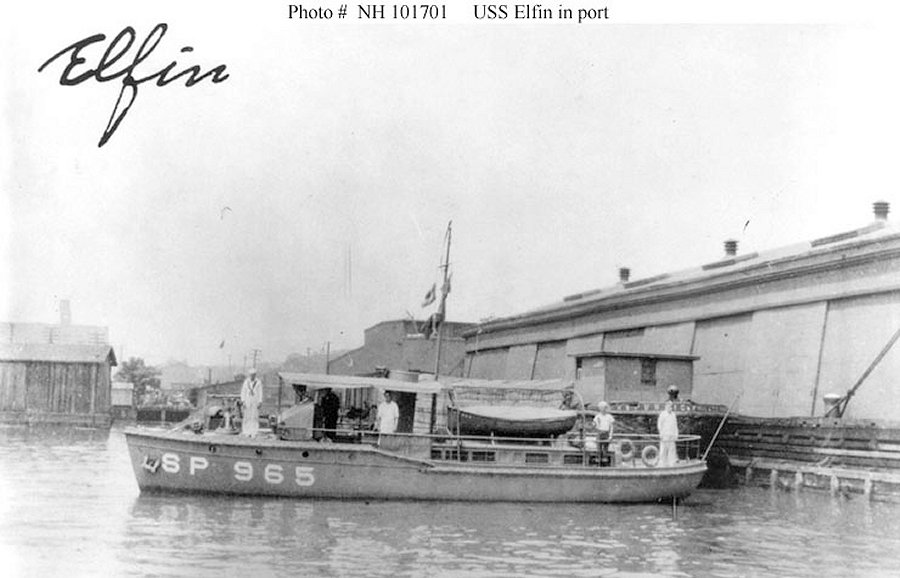
USS Elfin (SP-965) in port during World War I.

The second USS Elfin (SP-965) was a United States Navy patrol vessel in commission from 1917 to 1918.

== Background ==
Elfin was built in 1911 as a private motorboat of the same name by Britt Brothers at Lynn, Massachusetts. In July 1917, the U.S. Navy leased her from her owner, Alfred W. Gibbs of Wayne, Pennsylvania, for use as a section patrol boat during World War I. She was commissioned as USS Elfin (SP-965) on 26 July 1917.

Assigned to the 4th Naval District, Elfin served on patrol duties through the end of World War I.

Elfin was returned to Gibbs on 22 November 1918.
