= USS Dawn =

USS Dawn is a name used more than once by the United States Navy, and may refer to:

- USS Dawn (1857), a steamer in commission from 1861 to 1865 that saw service during the American Civil War
- USS Dawn (SP-26), a repair boat in commission from 1917 to 1918
- USS Dawn (SP-37), the proposed naval designation for a private yawl ordered delivered to the Navy in 1917 but never commissioned into Navy service
- USS Dawn (IX-186), a tanker in commission from 1944 to 1946
