= USS Dwyn Wen =

History

United States
- Launched: 12 May 1906
- In service: 19 February 1942
- Out of service: 1 April 1943
- Stricken: 18 July 1944
- Fate: Sold

USS Dwyn Wen (IX-58), an unclassified miscellaneous vessel, was the only ship of the United States Navy to have that name, which was given to her by her former owner, possibly in honor of Saint Dwynwen.

Dwyn Wen was acquired by the Navy and placed in service on 19 February 1942 and assigned to the 11th Naval District and later to Western Sea Frontier. Placed out of service on 1 April 1943, she was stricken from the Naval Vessel Register on 18 July 1944 and sold.
