= USS Dauntless (SP-1002) =

Patrol vessel of the United States Navy

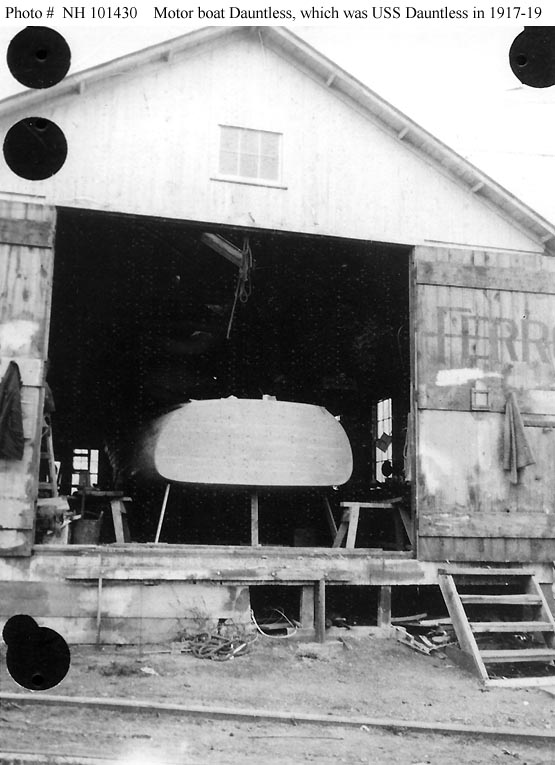
- A stern view of Dauntless as a private motorboat in a boat house – possibly that of her builder, W. Frank Harrison of Essex, Connecticut – ca. 1917, prior to her United States Navy service.

History

United States
- Name: USS Dauntless
- Namesake: Previous name retained
- Builder: W. Frank Harrison, Essex, Connecticut
- Completed: ca. 1917
- Acquired: 11 September 1917
- Commissioned: 1 October 1917
- Fate: Returned to owner 17 May 1919
- Notes: Operated as private motorboat Dauntless 1917 and from 1919

General characteristics
- Type: Patrol vessel
- Length: 45 ft (14 m)
- Speed: 30 knots

USS Dauntless (SP-1002) was a United States Navy patrol vessel in commission from 1917 to 1919.

Dauntless was built as a private motorboat of the same name around 1917 by W. Frank Harrison at Essex, Connecticut. On 11 September 1917, the U.S. Navy – whose inspectors had described Dauntless as a "new well built vessel ... suitable for gov't use as scout patrol in conn. with aeroplane work" – leased her from her owner, R. T. H. Barnes of Roxidge Avon, Connecticut, for use as a section patrol boat during World War I. She was commissioned as USS Dauntless (SP-1002) on 1 October 1917.

Assigned to the 2nd Naval District in southern New England, Dauntless served on patrol duties for the rest of World War I and into the early months of 1919.

The Navy returned Dauntless to Barnes on 17 May 1919.
