= USS Ensign =

Patrol vessel of the United States Navy

History

United States
- Name: USS Ensign
- Namesake: Previous name retained
- Builder: Britt Brothers, Lynn, MA
- Completed: 1914
- Acquired: 1917
- Commissioned: 17 September 1917
- Fate: Returned to owner 30 January 1919
- Notes: Operated as private motorboat Ensign 1914-1917 and from 1919

General characteristics
- Type: Patrol vessel
- Length: 68 ft (21 m)
- Beam: 11 ft 5 in (3.48 m)
- Draft: 4 ft 9 in (1.45 m)
- Speed: 9 knots
- Complement: 9

USS Ensign (SP-1051) was a United States Navy patrol vessel in commission from 1917 to 1919.

== Background ==
Ensign was built as a private motorboat of the same name in 1914. In 1917, the U.S. Navy acquired her under a free lease from her owner for use as a section patrol boat during World War I. She was commissioned on 17 September 1917, as USS Ensign (SP-1051).

Assigned to the 3rd Naval District, Ensign performed submarine net patrol duties in New York Harbor until May 1918, when was transferred to the 9th Naval District for service on the Great Lakes. Arriving at Detroit, Michigan, on 14 June 1918, she patrolled until late in 1918, when the annual freezing over of the lakes brought the 1918 Great Lakes shipping season to an end.

The Navy returned Ensign to her owner on 30 January 1919.
