= USS Ellington =

Patrol vessel of the United States Navy

History

United States
- Name: USS Ellington
- Namesake: Previous name retained
- Completed: 1915
- Acquired: 1917
- Commissioned: 22 May 1917
- Fate: Returned to Bureau of Immigration 26 February 1919
- Notes: Operated as Bureau of Immigration motor launch Ellington 1915-1917 and from 1919

General characteristics
- Type: Patrol vessel
- Length: 61 ft 6 in (18.75 m)
- Beam: 10 ft 6 in (3.20 m)
- Draft: 4 ft 6 in (1.37 m)
- Speed: 16 knots (30 km/h)
- Complement: 7

USS Ellington (SP-776) was a United States Navy patrol vessel in commission from 1917 to 1919.

Ellington was built as a civilian motor launch of the same name in 1915 for the Bureau of Immigration. In 1917, she was transferred to the U.S. Navy for use as a section patrol boat during World War I. She was commissioned on 22 May 1917 as USS Ellington (SP-776).

Assigned to the 12th Naval District, Ellington performed harbor patrol and guard ship duty in the San Pedro, Los Angeles, area for the rest of World War I.

Ellington was transferred back to the Bureau of Immigration on 26 February 1919.
