= USS Ella (SP-1676) =

Patrol vessel of the United States Navy

History

United States
- Name: USS Ella
- Namesake: Previous name retained
- Completed: 1902
- Acquired: 8 October 1917
- Fate: Returned to owner 29 October 1917
- Notes: No active U.S. Navy service; Operated as private motorboat Ella 1902-1917 and from October 1917

General characteristics
- Type: Patrol vessel
- Length: 32 ft (9.8 m)

The second USS Ella (SP-1676) was a patrol vessel briefly under United States Navy control during 1917.

Ella was built as a private motorboat of the same name in 1902. On 8 October 1917, the U.S. Navy acquired her from her owner for use as a section patrol boat during World War I. She was given the section patrol number SP-1676.

Apparently very quickly deemed unsuitable for naval service, Ella was returned to her owner on 29 October 1917.
