= USS Desire =

Patrol vessel of the United States Navy

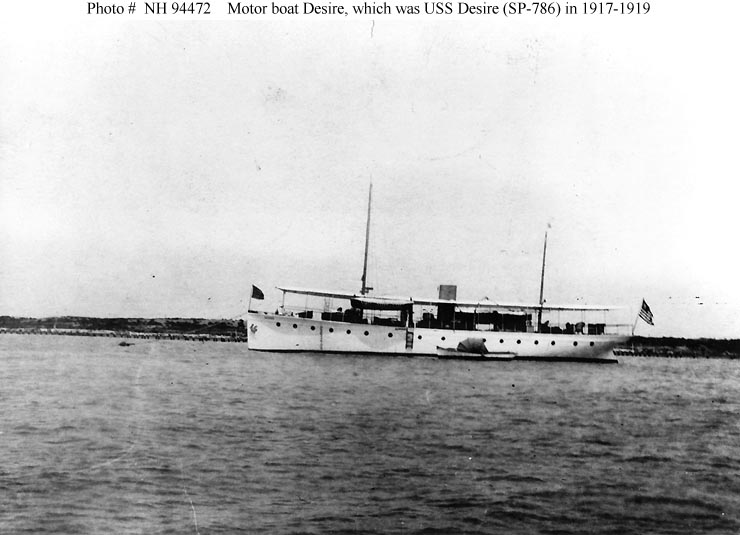
- Desire as a private motorboat sometime between 1913 and 1917.

History

United States
- Name: USS Desire
- Namesake: Previous name retained
- Builder: J. W. Munn, Galveston, Texas
- Completed: 1913
- Acquired: 1917
- Commissioned: 14 June 1917
- Decommissioned: 2 January 1919
- Fate: Returned to owner 2 January 1919
- Notes: Operated as private motorboat Desire 1913-1917 and from 1919

General characteristics
- Type: Patrol vessel
- Length: 90 ft (27 m)

USS Desire (SP-786) was a United States Navy patrol vessel in commission from 1917 to 1919.

Desire was built as a private motorboat of the same name in 1913 by J. W. Munn at Galveston, Texas. In 1917, the U.S. Navy acquired her under a free lease from her owner, Clifford Abeles of St. Louis, Missouri, for use as a section patrol boat during World War I. She was commissioned on 14 June 1917 as USS Desire (SP-786).

Assigned to the 5th Naval District, Desire carried out patrol duties and transported customs inspectors for the rest of World War I.

Desire was decommissioned and returned to Abeles on 2 January 1919.
