= USS E. Benson Dennis =

Patrol vessel of the United States Navy

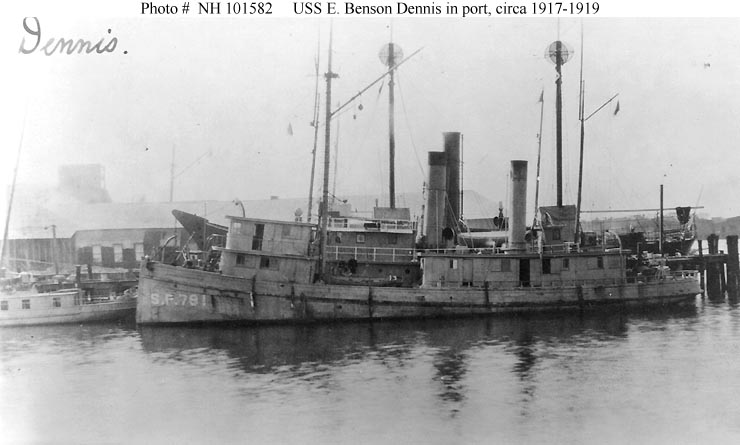
- USS E. Benson Dennis (SP-791) in port sometime between 1917 and 1919.

History

United States
- Name: USS E. Benson Dennis
- Namesake: Previous name retained
- Builder: C. W. Crockett, Pocomoke City, Maryland
- Completed: 1901
- Acquired: 14 May 1917
- Commissioned: 15 May 1917
- Decommissioned: 12 March 1919
- Fate: Returned to owner 12 March 1919
- Notes: Operated as commercial fishing trawler E. Benson Dennis 1901–1917 and from 1919

General characteristics
- Type: Patrol vessel
- Tonnage: 100 Gross register tons

USS E. Benson Dennis (SP-791) was a United States Navy patrol vessel in commission from 1917 to 1919.

E. Benson Dennis was built as a commercial "Menhaden Fisherman"-type fishing trawler of the same name in 1901 by C. W. Crockett at Pocomoke City, Maryland. On 14 May 1917, the U.S. Navy acquired her from her owner, E. Benson Dennis of Cape Charles, Virginia, for use as a section patrol boat during World War I. She was commissioned on 15 May 1917 as USS E. Benson Dennis (SP-791).

Assigned to the 5th Naval District, E. Benson Dennis performed submarine net patrols and guard ship duties for the rest of World War I.

E. Benson Dennis was decommissioned on 12 March 1919 and returned to Dennis the same day.
