= USS Derry =

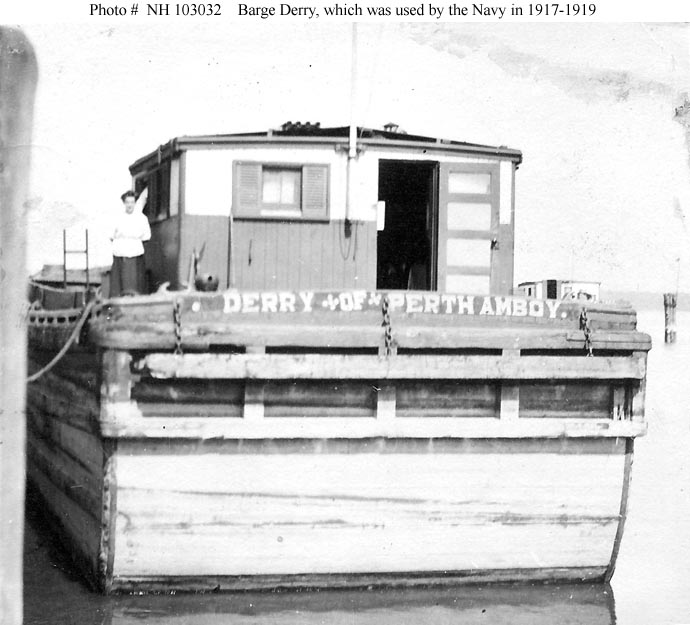
- Derry, probably photographed in 1917 at the time of her inspection for possible U.S. Navy service.

History

United States
- Name: USS Derry
- Namesake: Previous name retained
- Completed: 1894
- Acquired: November 1917
- Fate: Returned to owner July 1919

General characteristics
- Type: Barge
- Tonnage: 435 Gross register tons
- Propulsion: None
- Armament: None

USS Derry (ID-1391), was a United States Navy barge in service from 1917 to 1919.

Derry was built as a non-self-propelled commercial barge at South Rondout, New York, in 1894. The U.S. Navy acquired her from her owners, the Susquehanna Coal Company of New York City, in November 1917, assigning her naval registry Identification Number (Id. No.) 1391. She served in and near New York Harbor through the end of the war.

Derry was returned to her owners in July 1919.
