= USS Eolus =

USS Eolus may refer to:

- USS Eolus (1864), was a side wheel steamer commissioned 12 August 1864 and sold 1 August 1865
- USS Eolus (1869), was the former USS Shawnee, only holding the name for two months in 1869
