= USS Fresno =

USS Fresno has been the name of three ships in the United States Navy. All were named for the city of Fresno, California.

- USS Fresno (SP-3063) was a cargo ship acquired by the Navy in 1918 and transferred to the United States Shipping Board in 1919.
- USS Fresno (CL-121) was an Juneau-class light cruiser launched on 5 March 1946 and decommissioned in 1949.
- USS Fresno (LST-1182) was a Newport-class tank landing ship which served from 1969 until 1993.
