= USS Frances II =

American motorboat

History

United States
- Name: USS Frances II
- Namesake: Previous name retained
- Acquired: 1917
- Stricken: 1918

General characteristics
- Type: Motorboat
- Tonnage: 16 gross register tons

USS Frances II (SP-503), was a motorboat in United States Navy service from 1917 to 1918.

Frances II was assigned to the 4th Naval District for World War I service, where she served in a non-commissioned status from 1917 to 1918.
