= USS Fortune =

USS Fortune may refer to the following ships of the United States Navy:

- USS Fortune (1865) was a screw steamer launched in March 1865 and sold in 1922
- USS Fortune (IX-146) was acquired by the US Navy in February 1944 and decommissioned in 1945
