= USS Epsilon =

Tugboat of the United States Navy

History

United States
- Acquired: 3 June 1864
- In service: circa June 1864
- Out of service: circa June 1865
- Fate: Sold, 12 July 1865

General characteristics
- Displacement: 55 tons
- Length: 66 ft (20 m)
- Beam: 15 ft (4.6 m)
- Draft: 7 ft 6 in (2.29 m)
- Propulsion: steam engine
- Speed: 9 knots (17 km/h; 10 mph)

USS Epsilon was a tugboat acquired by the Union Navy during the American Civil War. She was used by the Union Navy as a tugboat and dispatch boat to support Union Navy patrol vessels on Confederate waterways.

== Service history ==
Epsilon, a steam tug, was purchased as Harry Bumm at Philadelphia, 3 June 1864, and assigned to duty in the James River. She was known as Tug No. 5 until November 1864 when she was named Epsilon. Throughout her career, Epsilon performed useful service in the James, reconnoitering, patrolling, serving as picket, carrying mail, and transferring men from one ship's company to another. Epsilon was ordered north in May 1865 and was sold at New York City 12 July 1865.
