= USS Enhance =

USS Enhance may refer to the following ships of the United States Navy:

- USS Enhance (AM-228, canceled June 6, 1944; List of mine warfare vessels of the United States Navy § Minesweepers (AM)
- USS Enhance (AM-437), was a minesweeper launched 11 October 1952 and decommissioned 31 December 1991
