= USS Dennis J. Buckley =

USS Dennis J. Buckley has been the name of more than one United States Navy ship, and may refer to:

- USS Dennis J. Buckley (DE-553), a destroyer escort canceled in 1944
- USS Dennis J. Buckley (DD-808), a destroyer in commission from 1945 to 1973
