= USS Edamena II =

Patrol vessel of the United States Navy

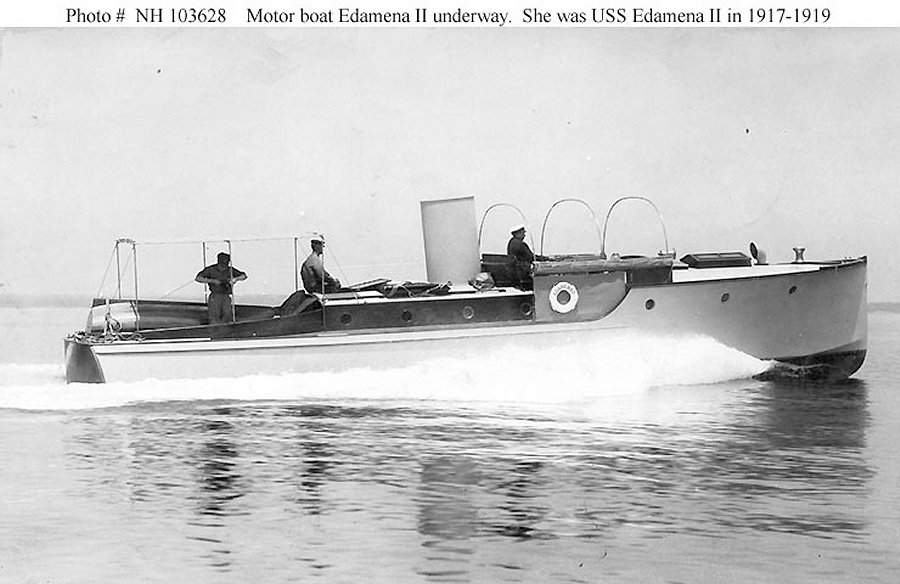
- Edamena II as a private pleasure craft in 1916–1917, prior to her U.S. Navy service

History

United States
- Name: USS Edamena II
- Namesake: Previous name retained
- Builder: George Lawley & Son, Neponset, Massachusetts
- Completed: 1916
- Acquired: 22 May 1917
- Commissioned: 24 May 1917
- Fate: Sold 14 February 1919
- Notes: Operated as private motorboat Edamena II 1916–1917 and from 1919

General characteristics
- Type: Patrol vessel
- Length: 45 ft 5 in (13.84 m)
- Beam: 9 ft 7 in (2.92 m)
- Draft: 2 ft 10 in (0.86 m)
- Speed: 25 knots
- Complement: 5
- Armament: 1 × 1-pounder gun

USS Edamena II (SP-14) was an armed motorboat that served in the United States Navy as a patrol vessel from 1917 to 1919.

Edamena II was built in 1916 by George Lawley & Son at Neponset, Massachusetts, as a private motorboat of the same name. The U.S. Navy acquired her from her owner, E.P. Charlton of Fall River, Massachusetts, on 22 May 1917 for World War I service. She was commissioned as USS Edamena II (SP-14) on 24 May 1917.

Edamena II was assigned to the 2nd Naval District and based at New Bedford, Massachusetts. She performed patrol and dispatch boat duties off southern New England until December 1918.

Edamena II was sold back to her former owner on 14 February 1919.
