= USS Direct (AM-430) =

Minesweeper of the United States Navy

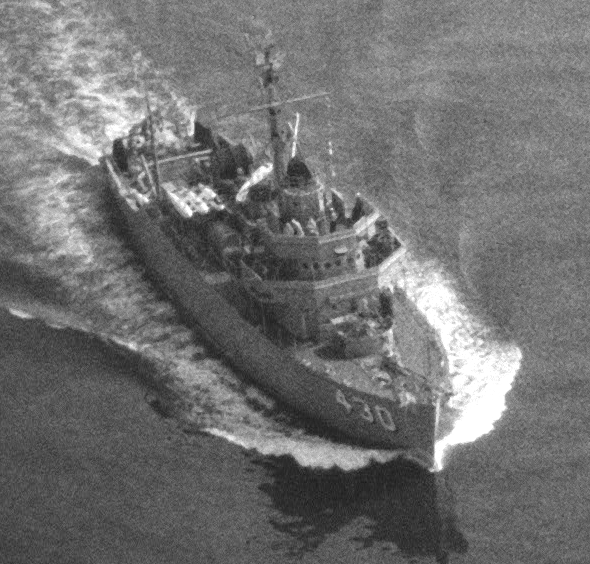

History

United States
- Name: USS Direct
- Builder: Hiltebrant Dry Dock Co., Kingston, New York
- Laid down: 2 February 1952
- Launched: 27 May 1953
- Commissioned: 9 July 1954
- Decommissioned: 2 October 1982
- Reclassified: MSO-430, 7 February 1955
- Stricken: 1 October 1982
- Fate: Sold for scrap, 26 January 1984

General characteristics
- Class & type: Agile-class minesweeper
- Displacement: 620 long tons (630 t)
- Length: 172 ft (52 m)
- Beam: 36 ft (11 m)
- Draft: 10 ft (3 m)
- Propulsion: 2 × General Motors diesel engines; 2 × shafts; 2 × controllable pitch propellers
- Speed: 10 knots (19 km/h; 12 mph)
- Complement: 74
- Armament: 1 × 40 mm gun

USS Direct (AM-430/MSO-430) was an Agile-class minesweeper of the United States Navy. Laid down on 2 February 1952 at the Hiltebrant Dry Dock Co., of Kingston, New York, the ship was launched on 27 May 1953; commissioned on 9 July 1954 by Benjamin H. Dean; and reclassified as an Ocean Minesweeper, MSO-430, 7 February 1955.

== North Atlantic operations ==
Based at Charleston, South Carolina, Direct operated on mine-sweeping exercises and training with other ships. She also provided services to the Fleet Sonar School at Key West, Naval Mine Defense Laboratory at Panama City, Florida, and Mine Warfare School at Yorktown, Virginia.

From 1 May to 2 October 1957 she cruised to the Mediterranean Sea for duty with the United States Sixth Fleet. On 14 April 1958 her home port was changed to Yorktown, Virginia, and on 15 January 1959 to Little Creek, Virginia. Between 27 April and 27 August 1959 she served again in the Mediterranean, then served in amphibious exercises and other operations through 1962.

== Decommissioning ==
Direct was decommissioned on 2 October 1982; struck from the Naval Vessel Register on 1 October 1982; and sold for scrap on 26 January 1984 to Wayne Hobbs, Huntington, California, for US$22,229 (equivalent to $68,887 in 2025).
