= USS Frigate Bird (AMc-27) =

Coastal minesweeper belonging to US navy

History

United States
- Ordered: as Star of San Pedro
- Laid down: 1935
- Launched: 1935
- In service: 30 January 1941
- Out of service: 27 April 1943
- Stricken: 27 November 1944
- Fate: fate, unknown

General characteristics
- Displacement: not known
- Length: not known
- Beam: not known
- Draft: not known
- Speed: not known
- Complement: not known
- Armament: not known

USS Frigate Bird (AMc-27) was a Frigate Bird-class coastal minesweeper acquired by the U.S. Navy for the dangerous task of removing mines from minefields laid in the water to prevent ships from passing.

== World War II service ==
The first ship to be named Frigate Bird by the Navy, AMc-27 served in a noncommissioned status in the 13th Naval District between 30 January 1941 and 27 April 1943.

Frigate Bird was struck from the Navy list 27 November 1944.
