= USS Daisy (1850) =

Tugboat of the United States Navy

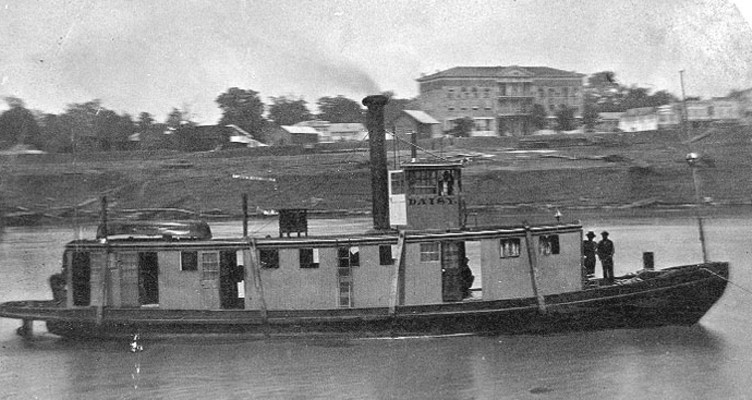
- USS Daisy off Mound City, Illinois, during the American Civil War. The Mound City hospital is in the background.

History

United States
- Name: USS Daisy
- Namesake: The well-known flower, common in the United States and Europe.
- Launched: 1850
- Acquired: 1 October 1862
- Commissioned: 24 October 1862
- Decommissioned: 1865
- Fate: Sold, 17 August 1865 at Mound City, Illinois

General characteristics
- Type: Tugboat
- Displacement: 50 long tons (51 t)
- Length: 73 ft 4 in (22.35 m)
- Beam: 13 ft 10 in (4.22 m)
- Draft: 6 ft (1.8 m)
- Propulsion: Steam engine, screw-propelled
- Speed: 10 kn (12 mph; 19 km/h)

USS Daisy was a tugboat acquired by the Union Navy during the American Civil War. She was used by the Navy to patrol navigable waterways of the Confederacy and to assist Union Navy ships requiring her towing services.

== Service history ==
Mulford—a steam tugboat—was built in 1850 at Chicago, Illinois, and acquired by the War Department for use in the Mississippi River and its tributaries early in the Civil War. She was transferred to the Navy on 1 October 1862 and renamed Daisy on 24 October. Daisy served actively as a tug in the upper Mississippi River until the end of the war when she was taken to Mound City, Illinois. She was sold there on 17 August 1865.
