= USS Endion =

US Navy motor boat used during World War I

History

United States
- Name: USS Endion
- Namesake: Previous name retained
- Completed: 1898
- Acquired: 1 May 1917
- Commissioned: 1 May 1917
- Stricken: 6 October 1919
- Fate: Sold
- Notes: Operated as private motorboat Endion 1898-1917

General characteristics
- Type: Patrol vessel
- Tonnage: 61 Gross register tons
- Length: 100 ft (30 m)
- Beam: 14 ft 2 in (4.32 m)
- Draft: 8 ft (2.4 m)
- Speed: 9 knots
- Complement: 16

USS Endion (SP-707) was a United States Navy patrol vessel in commission from 1917 to 1919.

Endion was built as a private motorboat of the same name in 1898. On 1 May 1917, the U.S. Navy purchased her for use as a section patrol boat during World War I. She was commissioned the same day as USS Endion (SP-707).

Assigned to the 1st Naval District in northern New England, Endion carried out patrol duties for the rest of World War I.

Endion was stricken from the Navy List on 6 October 1919 and subsequently sold.
