= List of U.S. military vessels named after women =

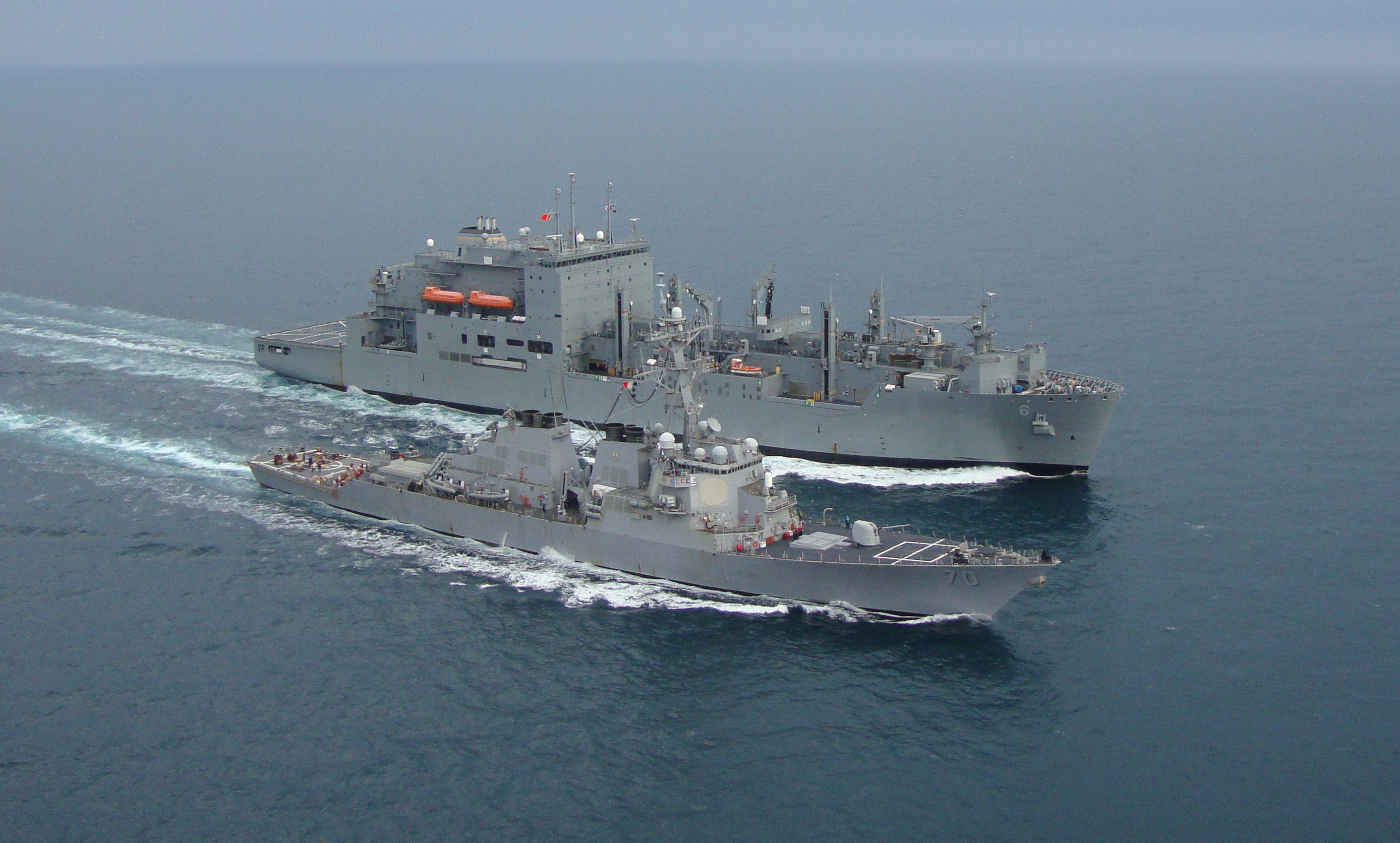
The guided-missile destroyer USS Hopper and cargo ship USNS Amelia Earhart conduct a replenishment in 2009. Both vessels are named after women.

On this list of U.S. military vessels named after women, there are many ships that have seen service with the United States military. Most of these were named in civilian service and then subsequently commissioned into the United States Navy as combat vessels, or as service vessels with U.S. Military Sealift Command. The earliest ships served in the Continental Navy. Overall, few ships have been named after women by the military. Ships often are named after people who served in the Navy, Marines, Coast Guard, or the government. Women have only recently been in such prominent positions, and therefore few have been so honored by the Navy.

== Continental Navy ==
- The schooner USS Hannah was commissioned in 1775.
- The gunboat Lady Washington was commissioned in 1776 and was the first American-armed ship named for a woman. She was a row galley, a small wooden river gunboat, built in 1776 by New York State to defend Hudson River, named in honor of Martha Washington. She remained active, under General Washington's command, through June 1777.
- USS Queen of France (1777), a frigate in the Continental Navy named for Marie Antoinette.

== United States Maritime Commission ==
- Sacagawea (YT-241), the first ship of the Maritime Commission named for a woman. She was named for Sacagawea in 1942, a Shoshone woman, who served as an interpreter and guide for the Lewis and Clark Expedition. The name was also assigned to a tugboat acquired by the Maritime Commission for the Navy. This Sacagawea was retained by the Maritime Commission and not commissioned in the Navy.

== United States Navy ==
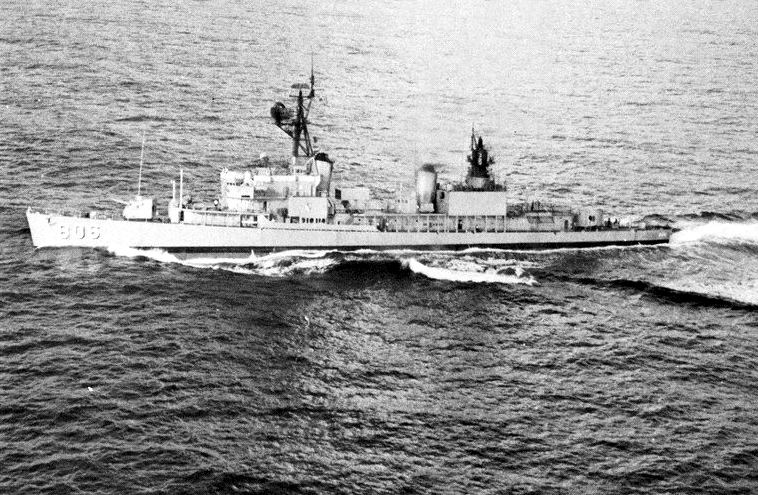
USS Higbee in 1969

The following is a list of ships in the United States Navy named after specific women:

- The sidewheel steamer Harriet Lane was launched in 1857. She was the first armed ship in service with the U.S. Navy to be named for a woman. Originally a Revenue Cutter, she was named for Harriet Lane, niece of President James Buchanan, who served as Buchanan's White House hostess.
- The sternwheel river steamer Bloomer was launched in 1856. This name was retained from a former name, of feminist Amelia Bloomer. Bloomer was captured from Confederates in 1862, but then served in the U.S. Navy from 1863–65.
- USS Pocahontas (1852), a screw sloop commissioned in 1860 and,
- USS Pocahontas (YT-266), a harbor tug commissioned in 1942, both named for the famed Native American princess Pocahontas.
- Six transports commissioned in 1942:
  - USS Dorothea L. Dix (AP-67), named for Dorothea Dix, first Superintendent of Army Nurses and mental health care activist.
  - USS Elizabeth C. Stanton (AP-69), named for suffragist Elizabeth C. Stanton
  - USS Florence Nightingale (AP-70), named for Florence Nightingale, founder of modern nursing.
  - USS Lyon (AP-71), named for Mary Lyon, founder of Wheaton and Mount Holyoke Colleges
  - USS Susan B. Anthony (AP-72), named for suffragist Susan B. Anthony
  - USS Anne Arundel (AP-76), named after a county in Maryland, which in turn was named for English noblewoman Lady Anne Arundell.
- USS Sacagawea (YT-326), a harbor tug acquired in 1942, named for the Native American guide on the Lewis and Clark Expedition.
- USS Watseka (YT-387), a 1944 harbor tug named for a Potawatomi woman, (the Naval Historical Center says the name Watseka is "possibly a variant spelling of Watsaghika, a former village of the Iruwaitsu Shasta Indian tribe of northern California, at the extreme west end of Scott Valley.")
- USS Higbee (DD-806), 1945 a Gearing-class destroyer named for Lenah S. Higbee, Superintendent of Navy Nurse Corps.
- USS Hopper (DDG-70), an Arleigh Burke-class destroyer named for Grace Hopper, a U.S. Navy Rear Admiral and computer technology pioneer who led the Navy into the digital age.
- USS Roosevelt (DDG-80), named for both President Franklin Delano Roosevelt and First Lady Eleanor Roosevelt.
- USNS Sacagawea (T-AKE-2), the second ship named for Sacagawea, launched in 2006, she is the second of a new class of replenishment ships.
- USNS Mary Sears (T-AGS-65), an oceanographic survey ship launched in October 2000, was named for Commander Mary Sears, a pioneer in oceanography.
- USNS Amelia Earhart (T-AKE-6) is a sister ship of Sacagawea, named for Amelia Earhart, a pioneer in aviation and women's rights activist.
- USS Gabrielle Giffords (LCS-10), an Independence-class littoral combat ship, named for retired U.S. congresswoman Gabby Giffords, who survived an assassination attempt.
- RV Sally Ride (AGOR-28), a Neil Armstrong-class research vessel named for astronaut Sally Ride launched in 2014.
- USS Lenah H. Sutcliffe Higbee (DDG-123), an Arleigh Burke-class destroyer, and second ship named for Lenah H. Sutcliffe Higbee.
- Ordered John Lewis-class replenishment oilers:
  - USNS Lucy Stone (T-AO-209), named for Lucy Stone, abolitionist and suffragist.
  - USNS Sojourner Truth (T-AO-210), named for Sojourner Truth, escaped slave, abolitionist, and suffragist.
  - USNS Ruth Bader Ginsburg (T-AO-211), named for Ruth Bader Ginsburg, Associate Justice of the United States Supreme Court.

== Other Navy ships with a woman's name ==
Many of these ships served in one or both of World War I, World War II, and some also during the interwar period. Many were the patrol boats (SP), while others were civilian craft (ID) taken into naval service. Others served in the Stone Fleet or were prizes during the Age of Sail. The names often came from a previous owner and almost all were commissioned into the Navy. While some were named by the navy, it is not known which.

Alphabetically

- USS Alice (SP-367)
- USS Anna B. Smith (ID-1458)
- USS Anna O'Boyle (ID-1736)
- USS Annabelle (SP-1206)
- USS Annie B. Embry (ID-2401)
- USS Annie E. Gallup (SP-694)
- USS Bella (ID-2211)
- USS Bessie (SP-1755)
- USS Bessie J. (SP-1919)
- USS Betty Jane I (SP-3458)
- USS Betty M. II (SP-623)
- USS Bonita (SP-540)
- USS Clare (SP-2774)
- USS Edithia (SP-214) (later YP-214)
- USS Elinor (SP-2465)
- Eliza Hayward (SP-1414)
- USS Elizabeth (SP-972)
- USS Elizabeth (SP-1092)
- USS Ellen (SP-284)
- USS Ellen (SP-1209)
- USS Emeline (SP-175)
- USS Empress (SP-569)
- USS Estella (SP-537)
- USS Etta M. Burns (SP-542)
- USS Guinevere (SP-512)
- USS Isabel (SP-521) (later PY-10)
- USS Isabela (SP-1035)
- USS Jane II (SP-1188)
- USS Jeanette Skinner (SP-1321)
- USS Joanna (SP-1963)
- USS Josephine (SP-913)
- USS Josephine (SP-1243)
- USS Joy (SP-643)
- USS Julia Luckenbach (ID-2407)
- USS Katherine (SP-715)
- USS Katherine K. (SP-220)
- USS Katherine W. Cullen (SP-3223)
- USS Katie (SP-660)
- USS Katrina Luckenbach (SP-3020)
- USS Katrina (SP-1144)
- USS Lady Anne (SP-154)
- USS Lady Betty (SP-661)
- USS Lady Mary (SP-212)
- USS Lady Thorne (SP-962)
- USS Laura Reed (SP-2009)
- USS Lucille Ross (SP-1211)
- USS Luella (ID-2691)
- USS Maggie (SP-1202)
- USS Margaret (SP-328)
- USS Margaret (SP-524)
- USS Margaret (SP-527)
- USS Margaret (SP-531)
- USS Margaret (SP-2510)
- USS Margaret and Jessie (1863)
- USS Margaret and Rebecca (1864)
- USS Margaret Anderson (SP-1203)
- USS Margaret Scott (1861)
- USS Margo (SP-870)
- USS Marguerite (SP-193)
- USS Maria (1864)
- USS Maria A. Wood (1861)
- USS Maria Denning (1858)
- USS Maria J. Carlton (1861)
- USS Maria Theresa (1861)
- USS Mariana (1915)
- USS Marica (1919)
- USS Marie (SP-100)
- USS Marie (SP-1260)
- USS Marija (SP-413)
- USS Mary Alice (SP-397)
- USS Mary B. Garner (SP-682)
- USS Mary M (SP-3274)
- USS Mary Pope (SP-291)
- USS Maud (SP-1009)
- USS Mercedes (YT‑108)
- USS Miss Anne II (SP‑657)
- USS Miss Betsy (SP-151)
- USS Miss Toledo (SP-1711)
- USS Nellie Jackson (SP-1459)
- USS Princess Matioka (SP-2290)
- USS Reina Mercedes (IX-25)
- USS Sara Thompson (SP-3148) (later AO-8)
- USS Sister (SP-822)

By designation

=== ID ===
- USS Anna B. Smith (ID-1458)
- USS Anna O'Boyle (ID-1736)
- USS Bella (ID-2211)
- USS Annie B. Embry (ID-2401)
- USS Luella (ID-2691)

=== SP ===
- USS Marie (SP-100)
- USS Miss Betsy (SP-151)
- USS Lady Anne (SP-154)
- USS Emeline (SP-175)
- USS Marguerite (SP-193)
- USS Lady Mary (SP-212)
- USS Edithia (SP-214) (later YP-214)
- USS Katherine K. (SP-220)
- USS Ellen (SP-284)
- USS Mary Pope (SP-291)
- USS Katrina Luckenbach (SP-3020)
- USS Katherine W. Cullen (SP-3223)
- USS Mary M (SP-3274)
- USS Margaret (SP-328)
- USS Alice (SP-367)
- USS Mary Alice (SP-397)
- USS Marija (SP-413)
- USS Guinevere (SP-512)
- USS Isabel (SP-521) (later PY-10)
- USS Margaret (SP-524)
- USS Margaret (SP-527)
- USS Margaret (SP-531)
- USS Estella (SP-537)
- USS Bonita (SP-540)
- USS Etta M. Burns (SP-542)
- USS Empress (SP-569)
- USS Betty M. II (SP-623)
- USS Joy (SP-643)
- USS Miss Anne II (SP‑657)
- USS Katie (SP-660)
- USS Lady Betty (SP-661)
- USS Mary B. Garner (SP-682)
- USS Annie E. Gallup (SP-694)
- USS Katherine (SP-715)
- USS Sister (SP-822)
- USS Margo (SP-870)
- USS Josephine (SP-913)
- USS Lady Thorne (SP-962)
- USS Elizabeth (SP-972)
- USS Maud (SP-1009)
- USS Isabela (SP-1035)
- USS Elizabeth (SP-1092)
- USS Katrina (SP-1144)
- USS Jane II (SP-1188)
- USS Maggie (SP-1202)
- USS Margaret Anderson (SP-1203)
- USS Annabelle (SP-1206)
- USS Ellen (SP-1209)
- USS Lucille Ross (SP-1211)
- USS Josephine (SP-1243)
- USS Marie (SP-1260)
- USS Jeanette Skinner (SP-1321)
- USS Eliza Hayward (SP-1414)
- USS Nellie Jackson (SP-1459)
- USS Miss Toledo (SP-1711)
- USS Bessie (SP-1755)
- USS Bessie J. (SP-1919)
- USS Joanna (SP-1963)
- USS Laura Reed (SP-2009)
- USS Princess Matioka (SP-2290)
- USS Julia Luckenbach (ID-2407)
- USS Elinor (SP-2465)
- USS Margaret (SP-2510)
- USS Clare (SP-2774)
- USS Sara Thompson (SP-3148) (later AO-8)
- USS Betty Jane I (SP-3458)

=== Other ===
- USS Margaret and Jessie
- USS Margaret and Rebecca
- USS Margaret Scott
- USS Maria
- USS Maria A. Wood
- USS Maria Denning
- USS Maria J. Carlton
- USS Maria Theresa
- USS Mariana
- USS Marica
- SS Harriet Tubman
- USS Mercedes (YT‑108) (yacht)
- USS Reina Mercedes (IX-25) (experimental)

== See also ==
- List of military units named after people
