= USS Maria (disambiguation) =

The US Navy has operated several ships featuring the name Maria:

- USS Maria, a tugboat launched in 1864 and sunk in 1870
- USS Fairy, a gunboat initially named Maria
- USS Maria J. Carlton, a schooner
- USS Maria Denning, a steamship
- USS Maria A. Wood, a schooner and gunboat
