= USS Margaret =

USS Margaret is a name used more than once by the US Navy:

- USS Margaret (ID-2510), a cargo ship in World War I, later renamed USS Chatham (ID-2510).
- USS Margaret (SP-328), a naval trawler purchased by the US Navy during World War I and configured as a patrol craft.
- USS Margaret (SP-524), a yacht converted to a patrol craft during World War I.
- USS Margaret (SP-527), a yacht acquired by the US Navy during World War I, and which was used as an armed patrol craft.
- USS Margaret (SP-531), a schooner placed into service during World War I.
- USS Margaret O (SP-614), a motor boat on loan to the U.S. Navy during World War I.
