= USS Marie =

USS Marie has been the name of more than one United States Navy ship, and may refer to:

- USS Marie (SP-100), a patrol boat in commission from June 1917 to August 1919
- USS Marie (SP-1260), a patrol boat in commission from October 1917 to January 1919
