= USS Ellen =

USS Ellen has been the name of more than one United States Navy ship, and may refer to:

- USS Ellen (1861), a side wheel steamer in commission from 1861 to 1862 and sold in 1865
- USS Ellen (SP-284), a patrol vessel in service from 1917 until 1918 or 1919
- USS Ellen (SP-1209), later USS SP-1209, a patrol vessel in commission from 1917 to 1919
