= USS Burns =

USS Burns has been the name of more than one United States Navy ship, and may refer to:

- USS Burns (DD-171), a destroyer in commission from 1919 to 1930
- USS Burns (DD-588), a destroyer in commission from 1943 to 1946

== See also ==
- USS Etta M. Burns (SP-542)
- USS W. W. Burns
