= USS Hopper =

US Navy Arleigh Burke-class guided missile destroyer

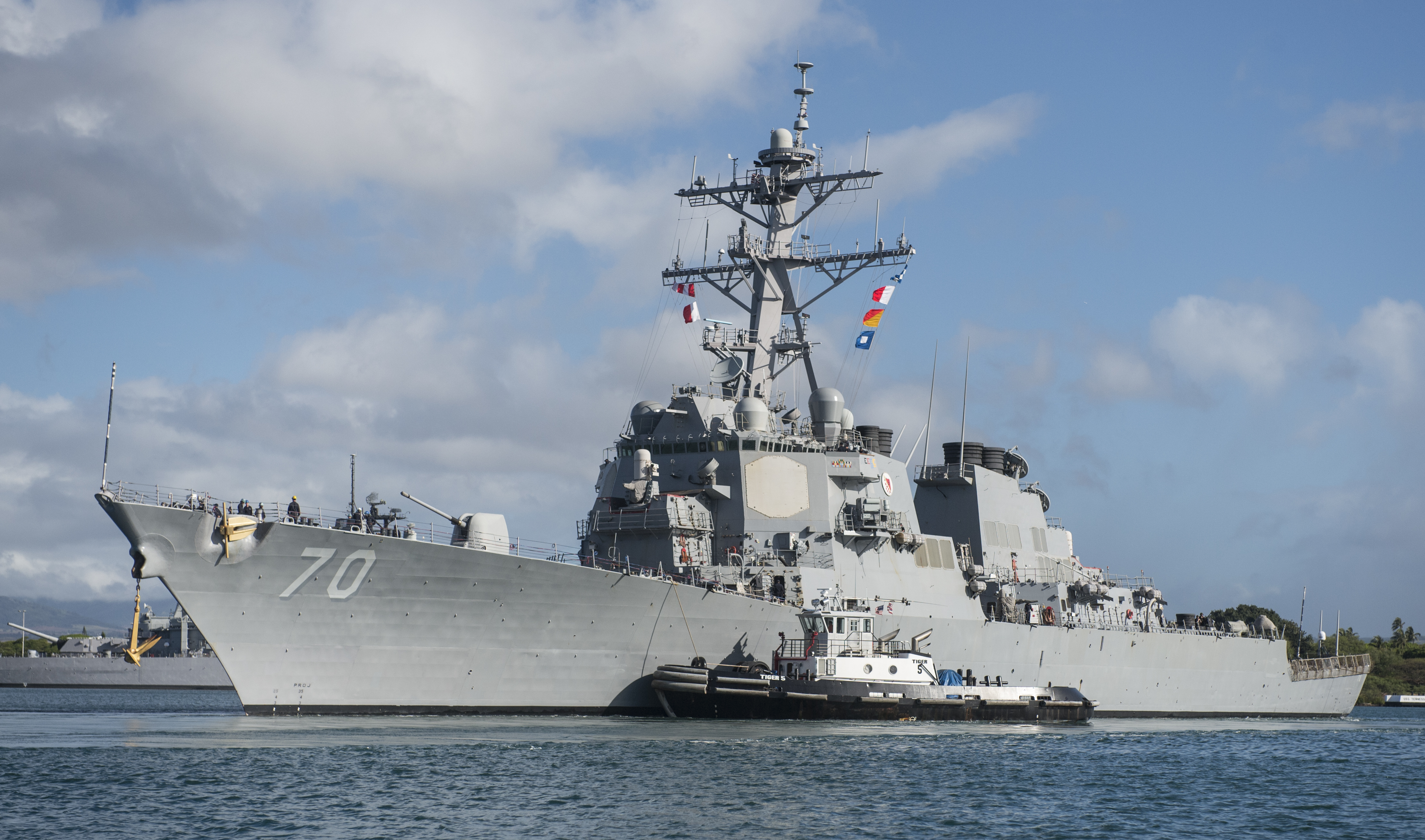
- USS Hopper at Pearl Harbor on 20 May 2016

History

United States
- Name: Hopper
- Namesake: Grace Hopper
- Ordered: 8 April 1992
- Builder: Bath Iron Works
- Laid down: 23 February 1995
- Launched: 6 January 1996
- Commissioned: 6 September 1997
- Home port: Pearl Harbor
- Identification: MMSI number: 667197000; Callsign: NHOP; Hull number: DDG-70
- Motto: Aude et effice (transl. Dare and do)
- Nickname(s): Amazing Grace
- Status: in active service
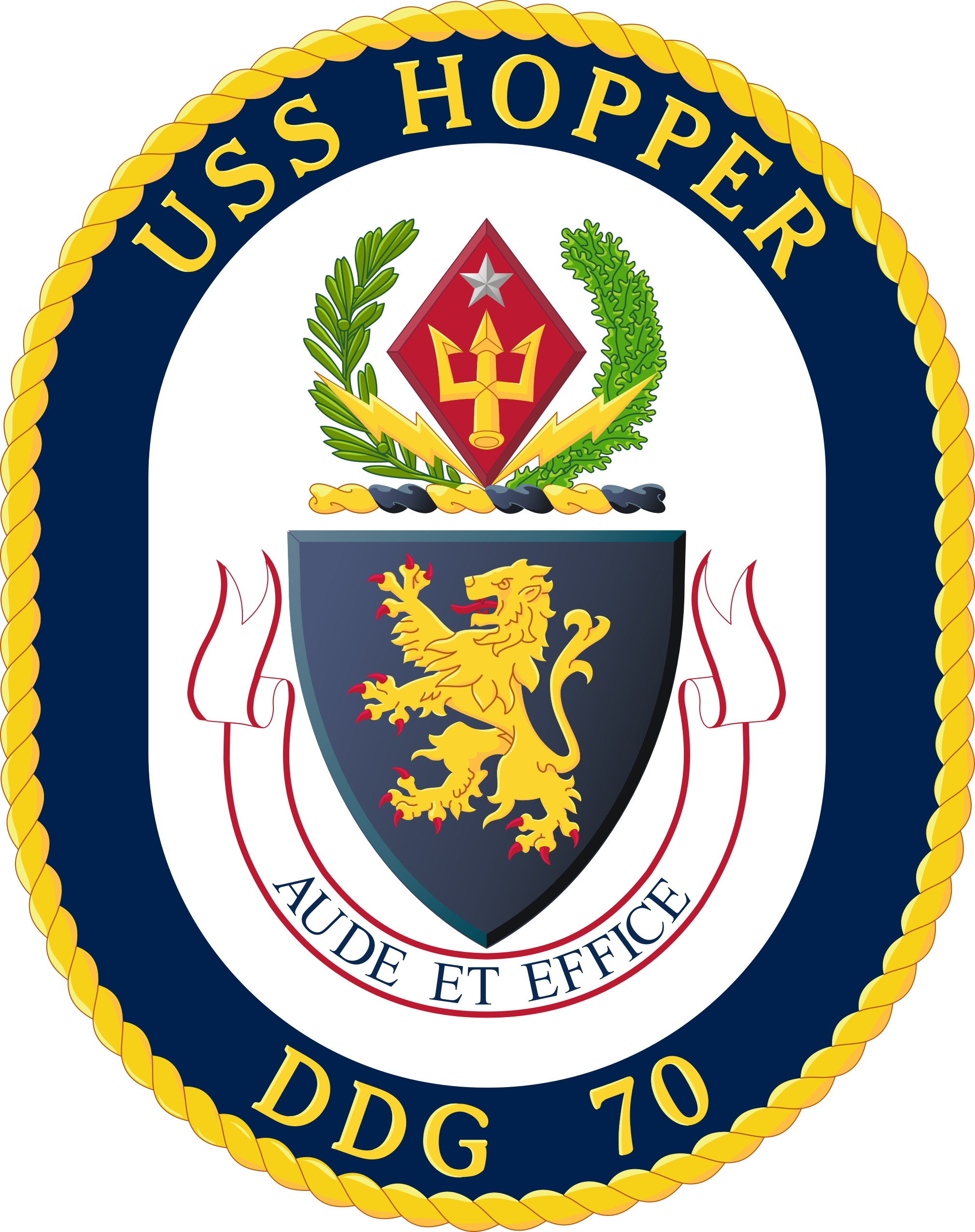
- Badge

General characteristics
- Class & type: Arleigh Burke-class destroyer
- Displacement: Light: approx. 6,800 long tons (6,900 t); Full: approx. 8,900 long tons (9,000 t)
- Length: 505 ft (154 m)
- Beam: 59 ft (18 m)
- Draft: 31 ft (9.4 m)
- Propulsion: 2 × shafts
- Speed: In excess of 30 kn (56 km/h; 35 mph)
- Range: 4,400 nmi (8,100 km; 5,100 mi) at 20 kn (37 km/h; 23 mph)
- Complement: 33 commissioned officers; 38 chief petty officers; 210 enlisted personnel
- Sensors & processing systems: AN/SPY-1D PESA 3D radar (Flight I, II, IIA); AN/SPY-6(V)1 AESA 3D radar (Flight III); AN/SPS-67(V)3 or (V)5 surface search radar (DDG-51 – DDG-118); AN/SPQ-9B surface search radar (DDG-119 onward); AN/SPS-73(V)12 surface search/navigation radar (DDG-51 – DDG-86); BridgeMaster E surface search/navigation radar (DDG-87 onward); 3 × AN/SPG-62 fire-control radar; Mk 46 optical sight system (Flight I, II, IIA); Mk 20 electro-optical sight system (Flight III); AN/SQQ-89 ASW combat system: AN/SQS-53C sonar array; AN/SQR-19 tactical towed array sonar (Flight I, II, IIA); TB-37U multi-function towed array sonar (DDG-113 onward); AN/SQQ-28 LAMPS III shipboard system
- Electronic warfare & decoys: AN/SLQ-32 electronic warfare suite; AN/SLQ-25 Nixie torpedo countermeasures; Mk 36 Mod 12 decoy launching systems; Mk 53 Nulka decoy launching systems; Mk 59 decoy launching systems
- Armament: Guns: 1 × 5-inch (127 mm)/54 mk 45 mod 1/2 (lightweight gun); 2 × 20 mm (0.8 in) Phalanx CIWS; 2 × 25 mm (0.98 in) Mk 38 machine gun system; 4 × 0.50 inches (12.7 mm) caliber guns; Missiles: 2 × Mk 141 Harpoon anti-ship missile launcher; 1 × 29-cell, 1 × 61-cell (90 total cells) Mk 41 vertical launching system (VLS): RIM-66M surface-to-air missile; RIM-156 surface-to-air missile; BGM-109 Tomahawk cruise missile; RUM-139 vertical launch ASROC; Torpedoes: 2 × Mark 32 triple torpedo tubes: Mark 46 lightweight torpedo; Mark 50 lightweight torpedo; Mark 54 lightweight torpedo
- Aircraft carried: 1 × Sikorsky MH-60R

USS Hopper (DDG-70) is an Arleigh Burke-class (Flight I) Aegis guided missile destroyer of the United States Navy, named for the pioneering computer scientist Rear Admiral Grace Hopper.

Hopper is only the second US Navy warship to be named for a woman from the Navy's own ranks. This ship is the 20th destroyer of her class. Hopper was the 11th ship of this class to be built at Bath Iron Works in Bath, Maine, and construction began on 23 February 1995. She was launched and christened on 6 January 1996. On 6 September 1997, she was commissioned in San Francisco.

== Service history ==
=== Deployments ===
Hopper has participated in multiple deployments to East Asia and the Persian Gulf, including RIMPAC 98, three individual PACMEF deployments, an Expeditionary Strike Group deployment to the Persian Gulf in 2004, and a deployment to Southeast Asia in support of Cooperation Afloat Readiness and Training (CARAT) 2006. In addition, Hopper has been foremost in the field of Ballistic Missile Defense.

On 1 April 2002, Hopper departed for a six-month deployment to the North Persian Gulf.

On 12 November 2007, Hopper departed with the USS Tarawa Expeditionary Strike Group for a scheduled deployment to the Fifth Fleet and Seventh Fleet.

On 6 January 2008, Hopper was involved in an incident with five gunboats of the Iranian Revolutionary Guard. Hopper, along with USS Port Royal, a guided missile cruiser, and USS Ingraham, a guided missile frigate, were entering the Persian Gulf through the Strait of Hormuz when the five Iranian boats approached them at high speed and in a threatening manner. The US Navy ships had been in the Arabian Sea searching for a sailor who had been missing from Hopper for 24 hours. The US Navy said the Iranian boats made "threatening" moves toward the US Navy vessels, coming as close as 200 yards (180 m). The US Navy received a radio transmission saying, "I am coming to you. You will explode after a few minutes." As the US Navy ships prepared to fire, the Iranians abruptly turned away, the US officials said. Before leaving, the Iranians dropped white boxes into the water in front of the US Navy ships. The US Navy ships did not investigate the boxes.

Officials from the two nations differed on the severity of the incident. The Iranians claimed they were conducting normal maneuvers while American officials claimed that an imminent danger to American naval vessels existed.

On 15 April 2011, Hopper departed from Pearl Harbor on a deployment to Asia and the Middle East.

On 22 June 2014, Hopper, with her Aegis Combat System, detected and tracked a test missile launched from the Reagan Test Site on Kwajalein Atoll using her onboard AN/SPY-1 radar, providing critical targeting data to a long-range ground-based interceptor (GBI) launched from Vandenberg Air Force Base, California. GBI's protect the US from limited long-range ballistic missile attack.

In January 2018, Hopper performed a freedom of navigation cruise, sailing within 12 nautical miles of the disputed Scarborough Shoal in the South China Sea. China, which has held the rocky outpost since seizing it from the Philippines in 2012, registered a protest on the grounds that the US Navy should have notified China in advance of its approach and had "violated China's sovereignty and security interests".

== Awards ==
- CNO Afloat Safety Award (PACFLT) - (2008)

== Coat of arms ==
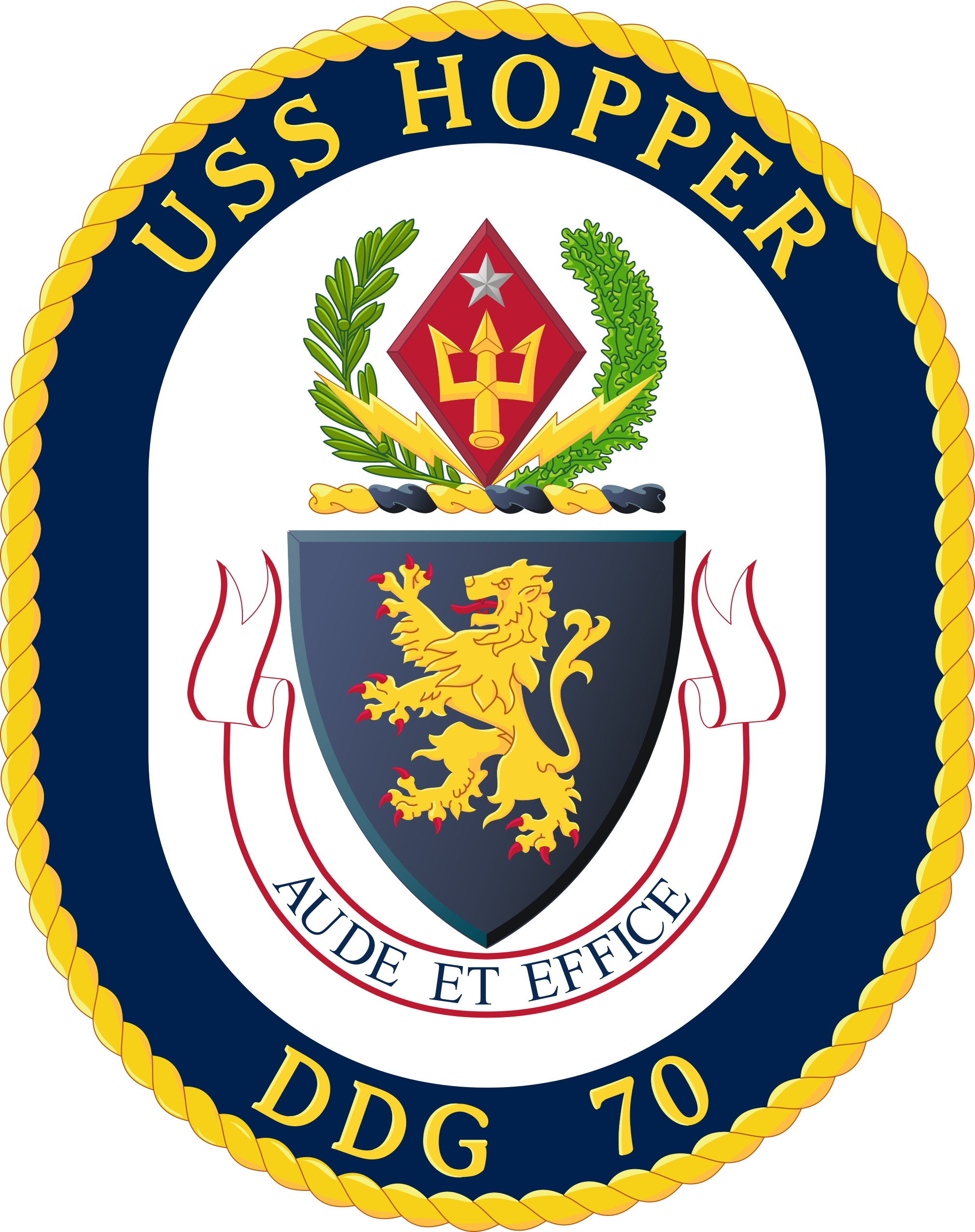
Crest

=== Shield ===
The shield has a background of blue. In the center is a gold lion with red talons.

=== Crest ===
The crest consists of a lozenge with a silver star above the trident. Surrounding the lozenge is a wreath with lightning bolts stemming from the bottom. The crest is completed by the blue and gold framing.

=== Motto ===
The motto is written on a scroll of white with red trim.

The ships motto is "AUDE ET EFFICE" which can be translated to "DARE AND DO" within context of a command.

=== Seal ===
The coat of arms in full color as in the blazon, upon a white background enclosed within a dark blue oval border edged on the outside with a gold rope and bearing the inscription "USS HOPPER" at the top and "DDG 70" in the base all gold.

== See also ==
- USS Higbee (DD-806), the first US warship named for a woman from the Navy, Lenah S. Higbee
- List of U.S. military vessels named after women
