= USS Betty Jane I =

Patrol vessel of the United States Navy

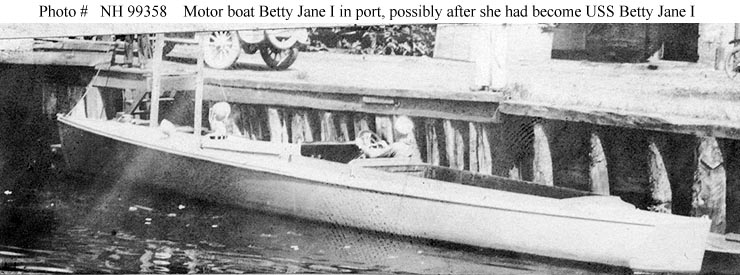
- Betty Jane I in an undated photograph which may have been taken sometime between 1913 and 1917 when she was still a private motorboat or at the time of her inspection by the 6th Naval District on 17 September 1918, a little over a year after she entered United States Navy service.

History

United States
- Name: USS Betty Jane I
- Namesake: Previous name retained
- Builder: Electric Launch Company (ELCO), Bayonne, New Jersey
- Completed: 1913
- Acquired: 4 September 1917
- Commissioned: 4 September 1917
- Stricken: 17 January 1919
- Fate: Returned to owner 17 January 1919
- Notes: Operated as civilian motorboat Betty Jane I 1913-1917 and from 1919

General characteristics
- Type: Patrol vessel
- Length: 36 ft 0 in (10.97 m)
- Beam: 6 ft 6 in (1.98 m)
- Draft: 2 ft 4 in (0.71 m) aft
- Speed: 24 knots

USS Betty Jane I (ID-3458), also listed as SP-3458, was a United States Navy patrol vessel in commission from 1917 to 1919.

Betty Jane I was built in 1913 as a private motorboat of the same name by the Electric Launch Company (ELCO) at Bayonne, New Jersey. On 4 September 1917, the U.S. Navy acquired her under a free lease from her owner, Percy Ballentyne of South Montrose, Pennsylvania, for use as a section patrol boat during World War I. She was commissioned later that day as USS Betty Jane I.

Assigned to the 6th Naval District, Betty Jane I patrolled the southeastern coast of the United States for the rest of World War I. In September 1918, she received a registration number, although sources disagree on whether this was the section patrol number SP-3458 or the naval registry identification number ID-3458.

Betty Jane I was stricken from the Navy Directory on 17 January 1919 and the Navy returned her to Ballentyne the same day.
