= USS Sacagawea (YT-326) =

Tugboat of the United States Navy

History

United States
- Name: USS Sacagawea
- Launched: 1925
- Acquired: by purchase, 1942, as Almirante Noronha
- Renamed: Sacagawea, September 1, 1942
- Reclassified: YTM-326, May 15, 1944
- Stricken: June 22, 1945
- Fate: Sold, May 1946

General characteristics
- Type: Tugboat
- Displacement: 225 long tons (229 t)
- Length: 97 ft (30 m)
- Beam: 21 ft 8 in (6.60 m)
- Draft: 9 ft (2.7 m)
- Speed: 10 knots (19 km/h; 12 mph)

USS Sacagawea (YT/YTM-326) was built in 1925, and acquired by the United States Navy from Brazil in 1942 as Almirante Noronha. She is one of the few US Naval vessels named for a woman. Sacagawea was a guide for the Lewis and Clark Expedition.

== Service history ==
She was renamed Sacagawea on September 1, 1942, and was placed in service as a harbor tug at Charleston, South Carolina, upon her delivery on September 30.

Reclassified YTM-326 on May 15, 1944, she served at Charleston until she was placed out of service and struck from the Navy list on June 22, 1945. Sacagawea was then turned over to the State Department for disposal and was sold to foreign purchasers in May 1946.
