= USS Miss Betsy =

History

United States
- Name: USS Miss Betsy
- Namesake: Previous name retained
- Builder: E. S. Thibault, Jacksonville, Florida
- Completed: 1916
- Acquired: 13 April 1918
- Commissioned: 21 September 1918
- Fate: Returned to owner 17 January 1919
- Notes: Operated as private motorboat Miss Betsy 1916-1918 and from 1919

General characteristics
- Type: Dispatch vessel
- Displacement: 7 tons
- Length: 41 ft (12 m)
- Beam: 9 ft (2.7 m)
- Draft: 2 ft 9 in (0.84 m)
- Speed: 15 knots
- Complement: 5
- Armament: None

USS Miss Betsy (SP-151) was a motorboat that served in the United States Navy as a dispatch vessel from 1918 to 1919.

Miss Betsy was built as a civilian motorboat in 1916 by E. S. Thibault at Jacksonville, Florida. The U.S. Navy acquired her on 13 April 1918 under a free lease from her owner, M. R. Ballantyne of South Montrose, Pennsylvania, for naval district use during World War I. She was commissioned on 21 September 1918 as USS Miss Betsy (SP-151).

Miss Betsy was assigned to the 6th Naval District at Charleston, South Carolina, where she provided dispatch boat and mail delivery services.

Miss Betsy was returned to her owner on 17 January 1919.
