= USS Lady Anne =

Patrol vessel of the United States Navy

History

United States
- Name: USS Lady Anne
- Namesake: Previous name retained
- Builder: A. C. Brown & Sons (Tottenville, Staten Island)
- Launched: 11 July 1914
- Completed: About 16 July 1914
- Acquired: (by USN): 10 April 1917
- Commissioned: 7 May 1917
- Decommissioned: 8 February 1919
- Fate: Transferred to United States Department of War 25 February 1920
- Notes: Operated as private pleasure craft under the names Danna and Lady Anne 1914-1917

General characteristics
- Type: Patrol vessel
- Tonnage: 27 tons
- Length: 65 ft (20 m)
- Beam: 15 ft 3 in (4.65 m)
- Draft: 4 ft 6 in (1.37 m)
- Speed: 10 knots
- Complement: 10
- Armament: 1 × 1-pounder gun; 1 × .30-caliber (7.62-millimeter) machine gun

USS Lady Anne (SP-154) was an armed motor launch that served in the United States Navy as a patrol vessel from 1917 to 1919.

== Construction and design ==
Lady Anne, a wooden-hulled motor launch, was built as a private pleasure craft for Daniel G. Whitlock of Eltingville, Staten Island, who intended to use her for summer cruises on the Hudson River and Long Island Sound. Her original name, Danna, was a compression of the given names of Whitlock and his wife Anna. (Note: The source gives the vessel's original name as Danana rather than Danna, presumably a transcription error as official records spell the name as Danna.) Danna was designed by Bowes & Mower and built by A. C. Brown & Sons of Tottenville, Staten Island. She was launched Saturday July 11, 1914 and had her trial trip on Thursday 16 July.

Danna was 65 ft (20 m) in length with a beam of 15 ft 3 in (4.65 m), draft of 4 ft 6 in (1.37 m), and gross tonnage of 27. (Note: According to DANFS; Lloyd's Register gives slightly different figures.) Her cabins were finished in mahogany, and she was fitted out with "every convenience" including electric lights. She had nine sleeping berths, toilets and a bath, and was said to be "one of the most complete and up-to-date boats of [her] kind". Danna was powered by a four-cylinder, 50 hp four-stroke gasoline engine with bore of 8 in (20 cm) and stroke of 10 in (25 cm), delivering a speed of 10 kn (19 km/h; 12 mph).

== Service history ==
Danna was sold to George P. Walker of Savannah, Georgia, on an unknown date and renamed Lady Anne. On 10 April 1917, the U.S. Navy purchased her from Walker for use as a patrol vessel during World War I. She was enrolled in the Naval Coast Defense Reserve on 19 April 1917 and commissioned on 7 May 1917 at Charleston, South Carolina, as USS Lady Anne (SP-154).

Assigned to the 6th Naval District, Lady Anne served as a section patrol and harbor patrol boat based at Savannah. She operated in the lower reaches of the Savannah River and along the Atlantic coast, inspecting merchant ships and sealing wireless radios.

Lady Anne was decommissioned on 8 February 1919 and transferred to the Naval Overseas Transportation Service for non-commissioned use as a harbor patrol boat at Charleston. Offered for sale on 13 November 1919, she was withdrawn from sale on 3 February 1920 and transferred to the United States Department of War on 25 February 1920.
