= USS Bonita (SP-540) =

Patrol vessel of the United States Navy

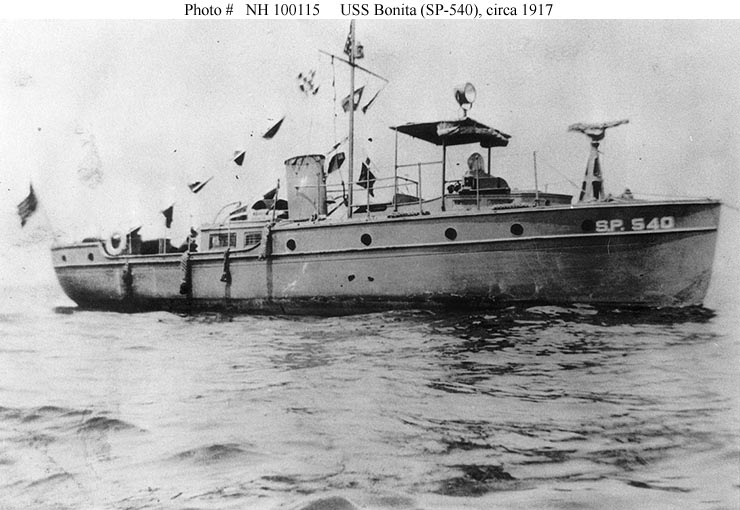
- USS Bonita (SP-540) ca. June 1917.

History

United States
- Name: USS Bonita
- Namesake: Previous name retained
- Builder: Holmes Motor Company, Mystic, Connecticut
- Acquired: 17 May 1917
- Commissioned: 1917
- Stricken: 18 December 1918
- Fate: Sunk in collision 26 November 1918
- Notes: Operated as private pleasure craft Bonita until 1917

General characteristics
- Type: Patrol vessel
- Length: 46 ft (14 m)
- Beam: 10 ft (3.0 m)
- Draft: 3 ft 6 in (1.07 m) forward
- Speed: 12 miles per hour
- Complement: 4
- Armament: 1 × 1-pounder gun; 1 × machine gun

The second USS Bonita (SP-540) was a United States Navy patrol vessel commissioned in 1917 and sunk in 1918.

Bonita was built as a private pleasure craft by the Holmes Motor Company at Mystic, Connecticut. On 17 May 1917, the U.S. Navy acquired her from her owner, Mr. Robert Windsor of Boston, Massachusetts, for use as a section patrol vessel during World War I. She was commissioned as USS Bonita (SP-540) soon thereafter.

Assigned to the 1st Naval District, Bonita operated on patrol duties in Boston Harbor for the rest of World War I.

Before dawn on 26 November 1918, Bonita collided with the fishing schooner Russell and sank. Repeated efforts to locate Bonita's wreck proved unsuccessful, and she was stricken from the Navy List on 18 December 1918.
