= USS Jane II =

Patrol vessel of the United States Navy

History

United States
- Name: USS Jane II
- Namesake: Previous name retained
- Builder: A. Appel, Trenton, New Jersey
- Completed: 1914
- Acquired: August 1917
- Commissioned: 1917
- Fate: Returned to owner 25 November 1918
- Notes: Operated as private motorboat Jane II 1914-1917 and from 1918

General characteristics
- Type: Patrol vessel
- Tonnage: 5 Gross register tons
- Length: 35 ft (11 m)
- Beam: 5 ft 6 in (1.68 m)
- Draft: 3 ft (0.91 m)
- Speed: 15 knots
- Armament: 1 × machine gun

USS Jane II (SP-1188) was a United States Navy patrol vessel in commission from 1917 to 1918.

Jane II was built as a private wooden motorboat of the same name in 1914 by A. Appel at Trenton, New Jersey. In August 1917, the U.S. Navy acquired her from her owner, George Gumphert of Philadelphia, Pennsylvania, for use as a section patrol boat during World War I. She was commissioned soon thereafter as USS Jane II (SP-1188).

Assigned to the 4th Naval District and based at Cape May, New Jersey, Jane II served as a patrol craft and dispatch boat through the end of World War I.

The Navy returned Jane II to Gumphert on 25 November 1918.
