= USS Lucille Ross =

Patrol vessel of the United States Navy

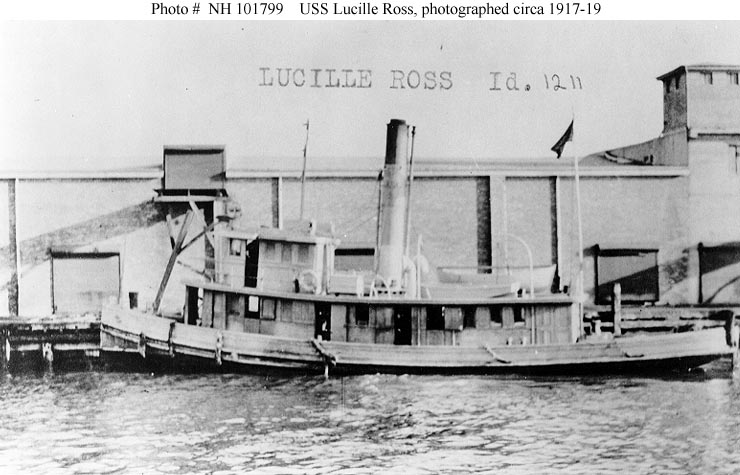
- USS Lucille Ross (SP-1211) sometime between 1917 and 1919.

History

United States
- Name: USS Lucille Ross
- Namesake: Previous name retained
- Builder: Brewster Shipbuilding Company, Baltimore, Maryland
- Completed: 1893
- Acquired: Chartered 17 April 1917; Delivered 18 April 1917
- Commissioned: 24 April 1917
- Fate: Returned to owner 3 June 1919
- Notes: Operated as commercial tug Lucille Ross 1893-1917 and from 1919

General characteristics
- Type: Tug
- Tonnage: 24 or 49 Gross register tons
- Length: 70 ft 7 in (21.51 m)
- Beam: 15 ft 5 in (4.70 m)
- Draft: 8 ft (2.4 m)
- Propulsion: Steam engine
- Speed: 10 knots
- Complement: 9
- Armament: None

USS Lucille Ross (SP-1211) was a United States Navy tug in commission from 1917 to 1919.

Lucille Ross was built in 1893 as a wooden commercial steam tug of the same name by the Brewster Shipbuilding Company at Baltimore, Maryland. On 17 April 1917, the U.S. Navy chartered her from her owner, the Richmond Cedar Works of Richmond, Virginia, for use during World War I. Delivered to the Navy on 18 April 1917 and assigned the section patrol number 1211, she was commissioned at Norfolk, Virginia, as USS Lucille Ross (SP-1211) on 24 April 1917. She was enrolled in the Naval Coast Defense Reserve on 20 August 1917.

Assigned to the 5th Naval District and based at Norfolk, Lucille Ross served as a shore and harbor patrol boat, assisted during customs inspections, sealed ships' radios, and performed occasional towing services. In addition she steamed the Chesapeake Bay and the Atlantic Ocean while carrying supplies to coastal lightvessels. During September and October 1918 she also provided towing service for the United States Army Transport Service.

The Navy returned Lucille Ross to the Richmond Cedar Works on 3 June 1919.
