= USS Lady Betty =

Patrol vessel of the United States Navy

History

United States
- Name: USS Lady Betty
- Namesake: Previous name retained
- Builder: Matthews Boat Company, Port Clinton, Ohio
- Completed: 1913
- Acquired: Chartered 28 May 1917; Delivered 11 June 1917
- Commissioned: 25 June 1917
- Decommissioned: 25 November 1918
- Fate: Returned to owner 9 December 1918
- Notes: Operated as private motorboat Chatana and Lady Betty 1913–1917 and Lady Betty or Chatana from 1918

General characteristics
- Type: Patrol vessel
- Tonnage: 16 gross register tons
- Length: 48 ft (15 m)
- Beam: 10 ft 3 in (3.12 m)
- Draft: 3 ft (0.91 m)
- Speed: 10 knots
- Complement: 6
- Armament: 1 × .30-caliber (7.62-mm) machine gun

USS Lady Betty (SP-661) was a United States Navy patrol vessel in commission from 1917 to 1918.

Lady Betty was built as the private motorboat Chatana by the Matthews Boat Company at Port Clinton, Ohio, in 1913. She was later renamed Lady Betty.

On 28 May 1917, the U.S. Navy chartered Lady Betty from her owner, Frank S. Washburn Jr., of Rye, New York, for use as a section patrol boat during World War I. The Navy took delivery of Lady Betty on 11 June 1917 at Newport, Rhode Island, and she was commissioned as USS Lady Betty (SP-661) on 25 June 1917.

Assigned to the 2nd Naval District in southern New England, Lady Betty carried out patrol duties in Newport Harbor and along the coast of Narragansett Bay for the rest of World War I.

Lady Betty was decommissioned on 25 November 1918 and returned to Washburn on 9 December 1918. It is unclear whether she bore the name Lady Betty or Chatana after her return to him.
