= USS Edithia =

Patrol vessel of the United States Navy

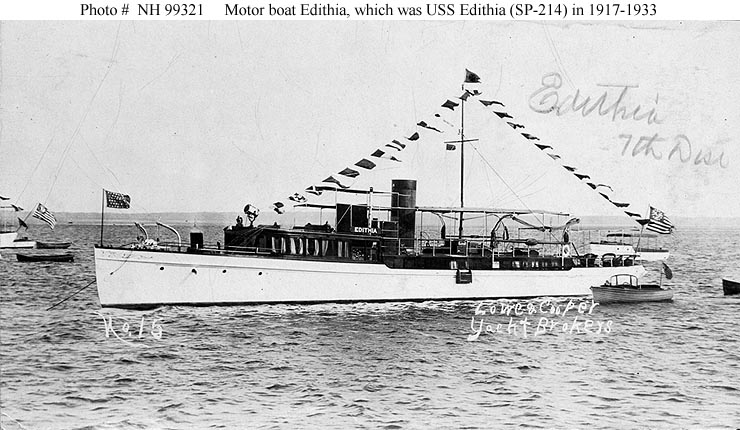

History

United States
- Name: USS Edithia
- Builder: C. L. Seabury Co., Morris Heights, New York
- Launched: 1909
- Acquired: by purchase, 1917
- Commissioned: 23 August 1917
- Decommissioned: 13 December 1921
- Reclassified: YP-214, 17 July 1920
- Stricken: 19 July 1933
- Fate: Sold, 3 October 1933

General characteristics
- Type: Patrol boat
- Length: 98 ft 8 in (30.07 m)
- Beam: 14 ft (4.3 m)
- Draft: 4 ft 6 in (1.37 m)
- Speed: 14 knots (26 km/h; 16 mph)
- Complement: 22
- Armament: 2 × 3-pounder guns

USS Edithia (SP-214/YP-214) was a motor yacht in the United States Navy.

== Construction, acquisition, and commissioning ==
Edithia was built by C. L. Seabury Co., Morris Heights, New York, in 1909; purchased by the Navy in May 1917; and commissioned 23 August 1917. She was classified YP-214 on 17 July 1920.

== Assigned to the 3rd Naval District ==
Edithia was assigned to the 3rd Naval District where she patrolled in Long Island Sound, and guarded the submarine nets in New York Harbor for the duration of World War I. Retained in the U.S. Navy after the war, she remained in the 3rd Naval District, carrying out various functions.

== Post-World War I decommissioning ==
She was decommissioned at the New York Navy Yard on 13 December 1921, and in July 1922, lent to the State of New Jersey. Returned to the Navy in 1932, Edithia was stricken from the Navy List on 19 July 1933, and sold on 3 October 1933.
