= USS Margaret Anderson =

Patrol vessel of the United States Navy

History

United States
- Name: USS Margaret Anderson
- Namesake: Previous name retained
- Builder: Harrison Lewis
- Completed: 1907
- Acquired: 15 June 1917
- Commissioned: 16 August 1917
- Fate: Returned to owners 31 December 1917 or in 1918
- Notes: Operated as private motorboat Margaret Anderson 1907-1917 and from 1918

General characteristics
- Type: Patrol vessel
- Tonnage: 5 Gross register tons
- Length: 36 ft (11 m)
- Beam: 11 ft (3.4 m)
- Draft: 3 ft 3 in (0.99 m) mean
- Speed: 8 knots
- Complement: 8
- Armament: 1 × 1-pounder gun

USS Margaret Anderson (SP-1203) was a United States Navy patrol vessel in commission from August to December 1917.

Margaret Anderson was built as a private motorboat of the same name in 1907 by Harrison Lewis. On 15 June 1917, the U.S. Navy acquired her from her owners, W. B. Anderson and N. F. Bonniville, for use as a section patrol boat during World War I. She was commissioned as USS Margaret Anderson (SP-1203) on 16 August 1917.

Assigned to the 5th Naval District and based at Oyster, Virginia, Margaret Anderson served on section patrol duties until at least the end of 1917. She was returned to her owners either on 31 December 1917 or sometime in 1918.
