= USS Guinevere (SP-512) =

Patrol vessel of the United States Navy

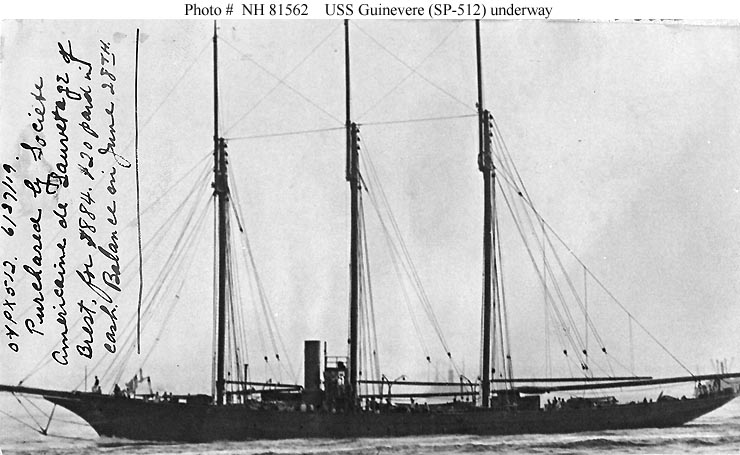
- USS Guinevere (SP-512) underway, ca. 1917.

History

United States
- Namesake: Previous name retained
- Builder: George Lawley & Son, Neponset, Massachusetts
- Completed: 1908
- Acquired: 10 June 1917
- Commissioned: 20 July 1917
- Fate: Wrecked 26 January 1918
- Notes: Operated as private yacht Guinevere 1908-1917

General characteristics
- Type: Patrol vessel
- Tonnage: 499 gross register tons
- Length: 197 ft 6 in (60.20 m)
- Beam: 32 ft 6 in (9.91 m)
- Draft: 17 ft (5.2 m)
- Propulsion: Steam engine and sails
- Speed: 10 kn (19 km/h; 12 mph)
- Complement: 75
- Armament: 4 × 3 in (76 mm) guns

The first USS Guinevere (SP-512) was a United States Navy patrol vessel in commission from 1917 to 1918.

Guinevere was built in 1908 as a private steam and sail yacht of the same name by George Lawley & Son at Neponset, Massachusetts. On 10 June 1917, the U.S. Navy acquired her from her owner, Edgar Palmer of New York City, for use as a section patrol vessel during World War I. She was commissioned as USS Guinevere (SP-512) on 20 July 1917.

Guinevere departed Coaling Station Newport at Newport, Rhode Island, on 1 August 1917 bound for St. John's, Dominion of Newfoundland; the Azores; and Brest, France. Arriving at Brest on 29 August 1917, she commenced patrols of the French coast and began escorting convoys to Quiberon, Ushant, Lorient, and St. Nazaire, France.

Guinevere ran aground and was wrecked off the French coast on 26 January 1918 with no loss of life. Her wreck was sold for scrapping to the French firm Societe Americaine de Sauvetage on 30 June 1919.
