= USS Annabelle =

Patrol vessel of the United States Navy

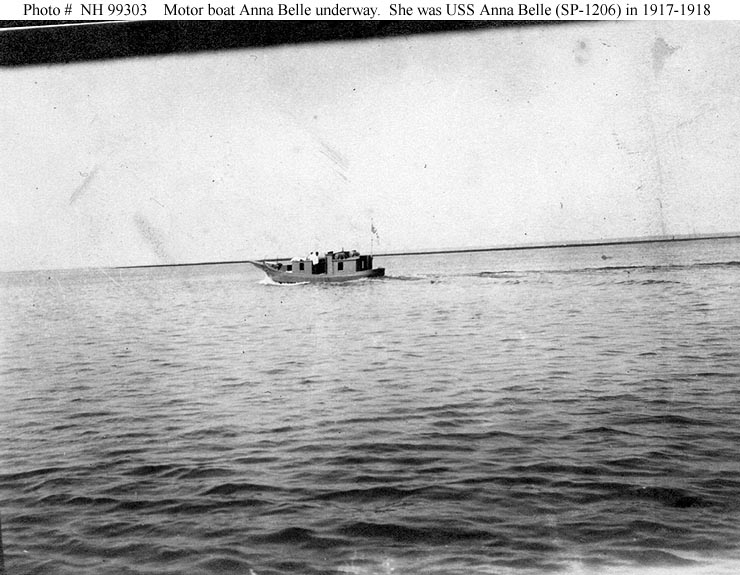
- Annabelle (or Anna Belle) probably as a private motorboat sometime between 1898 and 1917.

History

United States
- Name: USS Annabelle or Anna Belle
- Namesake: Previous name retained
- Builder: John Archie
- Completed: 1898
- Acquired: 15 June 1917
- Commissioned: 16 August 1917
- Fate: Returned to owner 20 December 1918
- Notes: Operated as private motorboat Annabelle or Anna Belle 1898-1917 and from 1918

General characteristics
- Type: Patrol vessel
- Tonnage: 8 Gross register tons
- Length: 37 ft 11 in (11.56 m)
- Beam: 11 ft 0 in (3.35 m)
- Draft: 3 ft 6 in (1.07 m) aft
- Speed: 8 miles per hour
- Complement: 5
- Armament: 1 × 1-pounder gun

USS Annabelle (SP-1206), also spelled Anna Belle, was a United States Navy patrol vessel in commission from 1917 to 1918.

Annabelle was built in 1898 as a private motorboat of the same name by John Archie. On 15 June 1917, the U.S. Navy chartered her from her owner, Mr. W. J. Mathewes of Chincoteague, Virginia, for use as a section patrol vessel during World War I. She was commissioned as USS Annabelle or Anna Belle (SP-1206) on 16 August 1917.

Assigned to the 5th Naval District, Annabelle served on section patrol duties in the Norfolk, Virginia-Hampton Roads area until returned to Matthewes on 20 December 1918.
