= USS Joanna =

Patrol vessel of the United States Navy

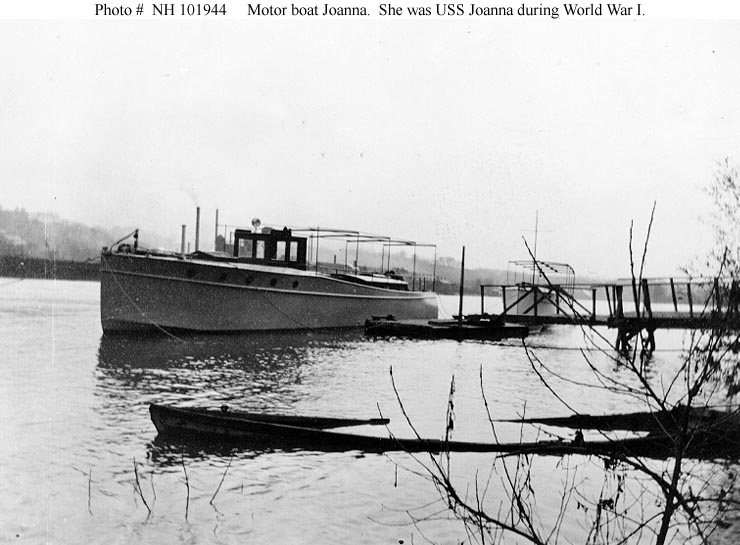
- Joanna as a private motorboat in 1917.

History

United States
- Name: USS Joanna
- Namesake: Previous name retained
- Builder: Albany Boat Corporation, Watervliet, New York
- Completed: 1917
- Acquired: 9 December 1917
- Commissioned: December 1917
- Stricken: 1920
- Fate: Written off as "unaccounted for abroad" 1920
- Notes: Operated as private motorboat Joanna 1917

General characteristics
- Type: Patrol vessel
- Displacement: 5 tons
- Length: 40 ft (12 m)
- Beam: 8 ft 6 in (2.59 m)
- Draft: 3 ft (0.91 m)
- Speed: 30 knots

USS Joanna (SP-1963), was a United States Navy patrol vessel in commission from 1917 to 1920.

Joanna was built as a private motorboat of the same name in 1917 by the Albany Boat Corporation at Watervliet, New York. In 1917, the U.S. Navy purchased her from her owner, Martin A. Metzner, for use as a section patrol boat during World War I. The Navy took delivery of her on 9 December 1917, and she was commissioned as USS Joanna (SP-1963) that month.

Assigned to the 3rd Naval District, Joanna served on patrol duty for the rest of World War I. In 1920 the Navy wrote her off as "unaccounted for abroad" and she was stricken from the Navy List.
