= USS Alice (SP-367) =

Dispatch boat of the US Navy

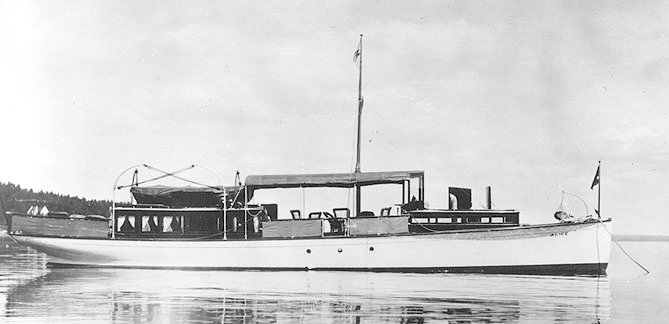
- Alice (c. 1913–1917)

History

United States
- Name: USS Alice (SP-367)
- Owner: United States Navy
- Port of registry: SP-367
- Builder: Gas Engine and Power Co.; Charles L. Seabury and Co.
- Acquired: 8 May 1917
- Commissioned: 29 September 1917
- Decommissioned: 9 May 1919
- Stricken: 7 July 1919
- Fate: Sold, 5 August 1919

General characteristics
- Tonnage: 20 t (20 long tons; 22 short tons)
- Length: 60 ft (18 m)
- Beam: 10 ft 10 in (3.30 m)
- Draft: 3 ft (0.91 m)
- Installed power: 80 hp (60 kW) × 2
- Speed: 16 kn (30 km/h; 18 mph) or; 16.5 kn (30.6 km/h; 19.0 mph)
- Complement: 6
- Armament: 1 × machine gun; 2 × one-pounders

USS Alice (SP-367) was a private motorboat bought by the United States Navy during World War I as a dispatch boat, and then sold again afterwards.

== History ==
Alice was owned by David H. Morris of New York City on 8 May 1917 when it was purchased by the United States Navy. The second Navy ship named Alice, it was commissioned on 29 September 1917, after which it was assigned to the 3d Naval District as a dispatch boat through the end of World War I ("transporting inspection and inventory parties around New York Harbor"). Decommissioned on 9 May 1919, the Navy struck Alice from the Naval Vessel Register on 7 July, and sold it on 5 August to Reinhard Hall of New York City.

== Technical specifications ==
Built in 1913 by Gas Engine and Power Co. and Charles L. Seabury and Co. at Morris Heights, New York, Alice was a motorboat. It was 60 feet (18 m) long, with a 10-foot-10-inch (3.30 m) beam, and a draft of three feet (0.91 m). Weighing 20 tonnes (20 long tons; 22 short tons), Alice's top speed was 16 or 16.5 knots (29.6 or 30.6 km/h; 18.4 or 19.0 mph), courtesy two 80-horsepower (60 kW), six-cylinder, gasoline-fueled, Speedway engines. While in Naval service, the ship was crewed by six sailors with a machine gun and two one-pounders.
