= USS Mary B. Garner =

Minesweeper of the United States Navy

History

United States
- Name: USS Mary B. Garner
- Namesake: Previous name retained
- Builder: William E. Woodall Company, Baltimore, Maryland
- Completed: 1912
- Acquired: 30 April 1917
- Commissioned: 12 May 1917
- Decommissioned: 15 May 1919
- Notes: Operated as commercial fishing vessel Mary B. Garner 1912-1917

General characteristics
- Type: Minesweeper
- Tonnage: 252 gross register tons
- Length: 140 ft (43 m)
- Beam: 22 ft 6 in (6.86 m)
- Speed: 11 knots
- Armament: 2 × 6-pounder guns

USS Mary B. Garner (SP-682) was a United States Navy minesweeper in commission from 1917 to 1919.

Mary B. Garner was built as a commercial fishing vessel of the same name by the William E. Woodall Company at Baltimore, Maryland, in 1912. On 30 April 1917, the U.S. Navy purchased her from the Coast Fish Oil and Guano Company of Lewes, Delaware, for use during World War I. Assigned the section patrol number 682, she was commissioned on 12 May 1917 as USS Mary B. Garner (SP-682).

Assigned to the Minesweeping Squadron of the 4th Naval District and based at Philadelphia, Pennsylvania, Mary B. Garner carried out minesweeping duties in the rivers, harbors, and coastal waters of Pennsylvania, Delaware, New Jersey, and Maryland. She ran aground and was wrecked on 11 April 1918 at Prime Hook Beach, Delaware, with the loss of one life, but she was salvaged and returned to her duties for the rest of World War I.

Mary B. Garner was decommissioned at Philadelphia on 15 May 1919.
