= USS Lady Mary =

Patrol vessel of the United States Navy

History

United States
- Name: USS Lady Mary
- Namesake: Previous name retained
- Builder: George Lawley & Son, Boston, Massachusetts
- Completed: 1905
- Acquired: Chartered 16 July 1917; Delivered 21 July 1917
- Commissioned: 24 July 1917
- Fate: Returned to owner 9 December 1918
- Notes: Operated as civilian yacht Glenda and Lady Mary 1905-1917 and as Lady Mary from December 1918

General characteristics
- Type: Patrol vessel
- Tonnage: 62.7 tons
- Length: 96 ft 6 in (29.41 m)
- Beam: 14 ft (4.3 m)
- Draft: 5 ft 6 in (1.68 m)
- Speed: 10 knots
- Complement: 9
- Armament: 1 × 3-pounder gun

USS Lady Mary (SP-212) was a United States Navy patrol vessel in commission from 1917 to 1918.

Lady Mary was built as the civilian yacht Glenda in 1905 by George Lawley & Son at Boston, Massachusetts. She was owned by B. E. Niese of New York City and C. S. Smith of Stamford, Connecticut, and was eventually renamed Lady Mary.

The U.S. Navy chartered Lady Mary on 16 July 1917 for World War I service as a patrol vessel and took delivery of her on 21 July 1917. She was commissioned at Newport, Rhode Island, as USS Lady Mary (SP-212) on 24 July 1917.

Assigned to the 2nd Naval District, headquartered at Newport, Lady Mary served on dispatch boat duty and patrolled coastal waters in Block Island Sound from Newport to Block Island.

Lady Mary was returned to her former owner on 9 December 1918.
