= USS Katrina =

Patrol vessel of the United States Navy

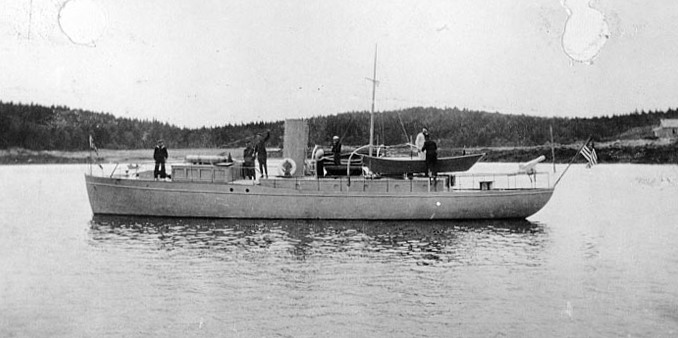
- Katrina as a private yacht ca. May 1917, just prior to her acquisition by the United States Navy. She already has been painted gray for Navy service but still flies the civilian yacht ensign.

History

United States
- Name: USS Katrina
- Namesake: Previous name retained
- Builder: George Lawley & Son, Neponset, Massachusetts
- Completed: 1913
- Acquired: 18 May 1917
- Commissioned: Into reserve 30 May 1917; Full commission 22 June 1917
- Fate: Returned to owner 15 February 1919
- Notes: Operated as private yacht Katrina 1913-1917 and from 1919

General characteristics
- Type: Patrol vessel
- Tonnage: 31 Gross register tons
- Length: 66 ft 6 in (20.27 m)
- Beam: 11 ft 7 in (3.53 m)
- Draft: 5 ft (1.5 m)
- Propulsion: Steam engine
- Speed: 9 knots
- Complement: 8
- Armament: 1 × machine gun

USS Katrina (SP-1144) was a United States Navy patrol vessel in commission from 1917 to 1919.

Katrina was built in 1913 as a private wooden steam yacht of the same name by George Lawley & Son at Neponset, Massachusetts. On 18 May 1917, the U.S. Navy chartered her from her owner, Mrs. Anna C. Ewing of Yonkers, New York, for use as a section patrol boat during World War I. She was commissioned into the United States Naval Reserve on 30 May 1917 as USS Katrina (SP-1144).

Initially assigned to the Bar Harbor Section Patrol at Bar Harbor, Maine, Katrina served on patrol duty, tended lookout stations, and served as an icebreaker. While there, she was placed in full commission on 22 June 1917 and enrolled in the Naval Coast Defense Reserve on 28 July 1917.

Katrina was ordered to Halifax, Nova Scotia, Canada, on 5 June 1918. Arriving there on 11 June 1918, she was used to transport men between visiting ships, the receiving ship, and the station hospital for the remainder of World War I.

The Navy returned Katrina to Ewing on 15 February 1919.
