= USS Estella =

Patrol vessel of the United States Navy

History

United States
- Name: USS Estella
- Namesake: Previous name retained
- Completed: 1912
- Acquired: 1917
- Commissioned: 24 May 1917
- Stricken: 13 June 1919
- Fate: Sold 1920
- Notes: Operated as private motorboat Estella until 1917

General characteristics
- Type: Patrol vessel

USS Estella (SP-537) was a United States Navy patrol vessel in commission from 1917 to 1919.

Estella was built in 1912 as a private motorboat. In 1917, the U.S. Navy acquired her for use as a section patrol vessel during World War I. She was commissioned as USS Estella (SP-537) on 24 May 1917.

Assigned to the 1st Naval District, Estella operated on patrol duties in northern New England waters for the rest of World War I and into 1919.

Estella was stricken from the Navy List on 13 June 1919 and sold in 1920.
