= USS Empress =

History

United States
- Name: USS Empress
- Namesake: Previous name retained
- Completed: 1912
- Acquired: 17 October 1917
- Fate: Foundered 4 November 1917
- Notes: Operated as commercial barge 1910-1917

General characteristics
- Type: Passenger barge
- Length: 147 ft 5 in (44.93 m)
- Propulsion: None
- Capacity: 1,200 passengers

USS Empress (SP-569) was a United States Navy passenger barge in commission during 1917.

Empress was built as a commercial barge in 1912. On 17 October 1917, the U.S. Navy acquired her for use as a passenger barge during World War I. Assigned the section patrol number 569, she entered service as USS Empress (SP-569).

Empress was under tow from New York City to Newport, Rhode Island, when her seams opened and she sank on 4 November 1917.
