= USS Sara Thompson =

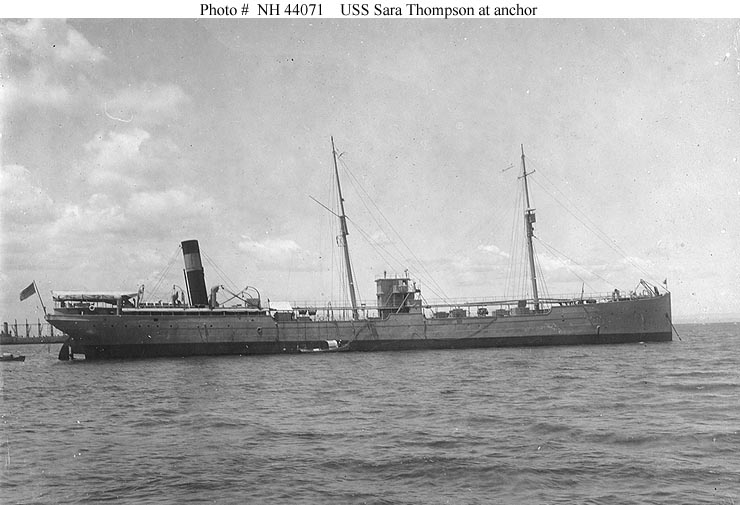
- USS Sara Thompson at anchor

History

German Empire
- Name: Gut Heil
- Operator: German Empire
- Builder: William Armstrong, Mitchell and Co., Newcastle, England
- Launched: 25 August 1888
- Fate: Sold to United States Navy 1918

United States
- Name: USS Sara Thompson (ID-3148)
- Namesake: named Sara Thompson at request of previous owner
- Acquired: 8 August 1918
- Commissioned: 17 September 1918 as
- Decommissioned: 21 July 1933
- Renamed: Sarangani 1934
- Reclassified: as AO-8, 17 July 1920
- Stricken: 12 December 1933
- Honors and awards: World War I Victory Medal (with Atlantic Fleet clasp)
- Captured: May 1942 by Japanese
- Fate: Sold on 9 August 1934 in Manila, scuttled 1942

Empire of Japan
- Name: Sanraku Maru
- Acquired: Raised, 6 May 1942
- In service: 1 January 1943
- Out of service: 15 June 1943
- Fate: Sunk by USS Trout, 15 June 1943

General characteristics
- Class & type: none
- Type: tanker
- Tonnage: 2,691 GRT
- Displacement: 5,836 tons fully loaded
- Length: 321 ft (98 m)
- Beam: 40 ft 3 in (12.27 m)
- Draft: 22 ft (6.7 m)
- Propulsion: steam engine, one shaft
- Speed: 9 knots (17 km/h; 10 mph)
- Complement: 67

USS Sara Thompson (SP-3148/AO-8) was a tanker in the United States Navy. She was purchased at the start of World War I by the U.S. Navy and served as a tanker supporting American troops in Europe. Post-war she operated in the Pacific Ocean, supporting Navy operations in the Guam, China, and the Philippines. Because of her age and deteriorating condition, she spent her final days in the US Navy as a receiving hulk in the Philippines.

== Early career and acquisition ==
=== Built in England as Gut Heil ===
Sara Thompson was built during 1888 by William Armstrong, Mitchell and Co., Newcastle, England, as the German merchant tanker Gut Heil, and was sold to a United States firm in 1912, retaining her original name. Accidentally lost on the Mississippi River during 1914, Gut Heil was raised during 1917 and repaired.

=== Acquired by the U.S. Navy ===
She was purchased on 8 August 1918 for United States Naval service from J. W. Thompson of New York, and renamed Sara Thompson on 7 September 1918 at the request of her former owner. Sara Thompson was commissioned on 17 September 1918 at New Orleans, Louisiana.

== World War I service ==
Assigned to the Naval Overseas Transportation Service (NOTS), Sara Thompson transported fuel oil from Baton Rouge, Louisiana, Port Arthur, Texas, and Hoboken, New Jersey, to Boston, Massachusetts and Bermuda into February 1919.

Arriving on 4 March 1919 at Ponta Delgada, São Miguel, Azores, she was detached from NOTS on the same day and assigned to the Train, Atlantic Fleet. Sara Thompson remained at Ponta Delgada as station tanker until 7 September 1919 when she sailed for the Philippine Islands. Calling at Gibraltar, Suez, and Colombo, the tanker arrived in Manila Bay on 9 November 1919 for permanent assignment as fuel storage ship at the Cavite Navy Yard.

== Post-war service ==
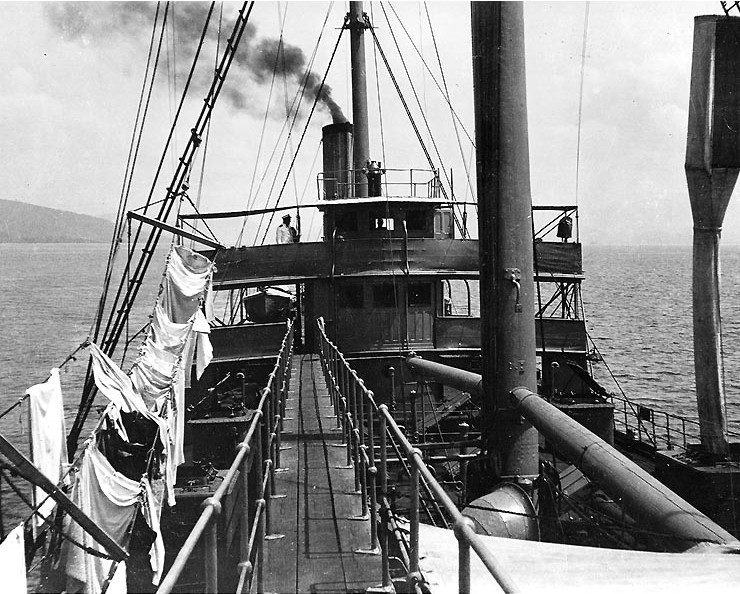
1920s deck view of USS Sara Thompson.

Sara Thompson steamed to Apra Harbor, Guam, during April 1920 to refuel units of Destroyer Division 13, before returning to Cavite on 7 May 1920. She was classified AO-8 as an oiler on 17 July 1920. She steamed northward to Chefoo, China, twice during 1920, operating with ships of the U.S. Asiatic Fleet before returning to Manila Bay on 12 October. Sara Thompson continued local operations with Cavite-based destroyer forces into November 1921.

Inspection of her deteriorating engines led to Sara Thompson being placed in reduced commission "in ordinary" on 8 December 1921 for duty only as a floating storage vessel for fuel and diesel oil. She remained in service into the 1930s, being designated the receiving ship at Cavite on 6 January 1930 with her commanding officer also commanding the Receiving Station ashore.

=== Final decommissioning ===
Sara Thompson was decommissioned on 21 July 1933 and struck from the Navy list on 12 December 1933. Her hulk was sold on 9 August 1934 to Alberto Barrette of Manila. Renamed Sarangani. The vessel was used by the US Navy as a bunker ship (storage hulk).

== World War II ==
She was scuttled in 1942 to prevent capture by the Japanese. The ship was renamed Sanraku Maru on 6 May 1942. On 30 September 1942, the hulk was refloated. Repairs were completed in December 1942. The ship was registered with the Imperial Japanese Navy as an auxiliary oiler on 1 January 1943. Conversion to an oiler began 19 January 1943 and finished 3 February 1943. Sanraku Maru was operated by Osaka Shosen Kaisho. The ship was sunk by USS Trout near Cape Lovieanne, Borneo in the Celebes Sea on 15 June 1943.
