= USS Gallup (SP-694) =

United States Navy minesweeper

Coordinates: 38.805°N 75.088°W

History

United States
- Name: USS Gallup
- Namesake: Previous name retained and shortened
- Completed: 1878
- Acquired: 1917
- Commissioned: 15 August 1917
- Stricken: 20 May 1918
- Fate: Wrecked 21 February 1918
- Notes: Operated as commercial fishing trawler Annie E. Gallup 1878-1917

General characteristics
- Type: Minesweeper
- Tonnage: 141 Gross register tons
- Length: 116 ft 6 in (35.51 m)
- Beam: 18 ft 7 in (5.66 m)
- Propulsion: Steam engine
- Speed: 9 knots
- Armament: 2 × 1-pounder guns

The first USS Gallup (SP-694), ex-Annie E. Gallup, was a United States Navy minesweeper commissioned in 1917 and lost in 1918.

Gallup was built as the commercial "menhaden fisherman"-type steam fishing trawler Annie E. Gallup at Fall River, Massachusetts, in 1878. In 1917, the U.S. Navy acquired Annie E. Gallup from the Delaware Fish and Oil Company of Lewes, Delaware, for use as a minesweeper during World War I. The Navy originally intended to commission her under her full original name, but on 28 July 1917 General Order No. 314 specified that all section patrol vessels bearing compound names would be referred to by last name only. Accordingly, she was commissioned at Philadelphia, Pennsylvania, on 15 August 1917 as USS Gallup (SP-694).

Assigned to the 4th Naval District, Gallup carried out minesweeping duties into the early weeks of 1918.

At 1200 hours on 20 February 1918 Gallup, by then under the command of Ensign C. P. Berlin, USNRF, was anchored in the Harbor of Refuge at Lewes when a moderate northwest gale caused her to drag her anchor. The following morning, despite the fact that her engines were working at full power, Gallup ran aground, stern first, on the point of Cape Henlopen, Delaware, swinging around broadside to the beach. In response to her distress signals, United States Coast Guard crews from nearby lifesaving stations brought her complement ashore without loss of life. However, Gallup broke in two forward of her engine room and was declared a total loss.

Gallup was stricken from the Navy List on 20 May 1918.
