= USS Sister =

Patrol vessel of the United States Navy

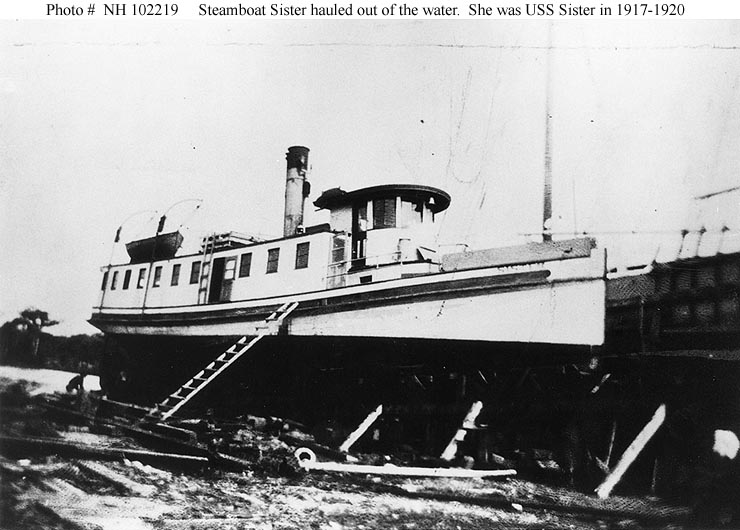
- Sister as a commercial tug, hauled out of the water sometime between 1882 and 1917.

History

United States
- Name: USS Sister
- Namesake: Previous name retained
- Completed: 1882
- Acquired: Delivered May 1917; Purchased 29 June 1917
- Commissioned: 11 June 1917
- Stricken: 17 June 1919
- Fate: Sold 10 March or 3 October 1920
- Notes: Operated as commercial tug Sister 1882-1917

General characteristics
- Type: Patrol vessel
- Tonnage: 49 Gross register tons
- Length: 72 ft (22 m)
- Beam: 14 ft 6 in (4.42 m)
- Draft: 6 ft 6 in (1.98 m)
- Propulsion: Steam engine
- Speed: 12 knots
- Complement: 7
- Armament: 1 × 3-pounder gun

USS Sister (SP-822) was a United States Navy tug in commission from 1917 to 1919.

Sister was built as a small commercial steam tug of the same name in 1882. She was based at Madisonville, Louisiana, in May 1917 when the U.S. Navy acquired her from her owner, L. F. Young of Madisonville, for use during World War I. She was assigned the section patrol number 822 and commissioned as USS Sister (SP-822) on 11 June 1917. The Navy formally purchased her from Young on 29 June 1917.

Assigned to the 8th Naval District, Sister served as a tug and freight boat for the rest of World War I and into 1919. One source claims that she also carried out patrol duties.

Sister was stricken from the Navy List on 17 June 1919 and sold to Armond Mayville of Algiers, Louisiana, on either 10 March or 3 October 1920
