= USS Mary M =

Vintage US Navy motor boat

History

United States
- Name: USS Mary M
- Namesake: Previous name retained
- Completed: 1904
- Acquired: 1919
- Fate: Sold 1 May 1922
- Notes: Operated as civilian motorboat Mary M 1904-1919

General characteristics
- Type: Motor launch
- Tonnage: 26 Gross register tons
- Length: 64 ft 0 in (19.51 m)
- Beam: 12 ft 2 in (3.71 m)
- Draft: 4 ft 0 in (1.22 m)
- Speed: 10 miles per hour
- Armament: None

USS Mary M (SP-3274) was a United States Navy motor launch in commission from 1919 to 1922.

Mary M was built as a civilian motorboat of the same name in 1904 at Sharptown, Maryland. In 1919, the U.S. Navy acquired her from her owner, the J. G. White Engineering Company, and assigned her the section patrol number SP-3274.

Assigned to the 5th Naval District, Mary M served as a launch at Indian Head, Maryland, until sold on 1 May 1922.
