= USS Emeline =

Steam yacht and US Navy patrol craft

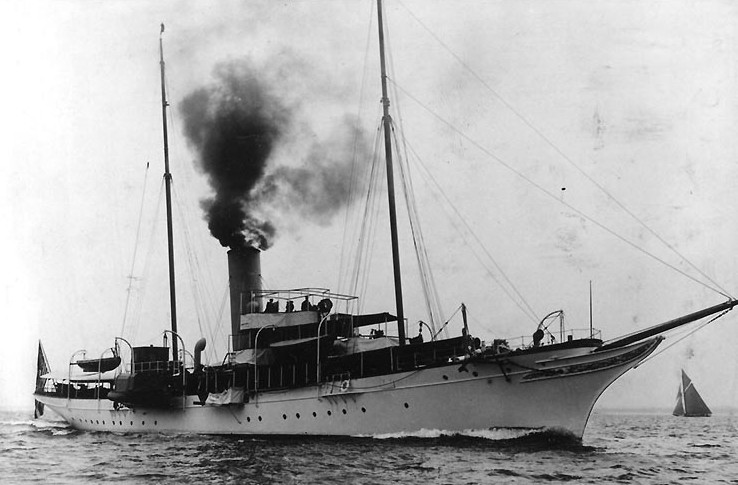
- USS Emeline (SP-175)

History

United States
- Name: USS Emeline
- Namesake: A name retained
- Owner: Robert Graves of New York City
- Port of registry: New York
- Builder: Ailsa Shipbuilding Co, Troon
- Yard number: 78
- Launched: 28 December 1898
- Christened: as Katoomba
- Acquired: 10 June 1917
- Commissioned: 14 July 1917
- Decommissioned: 19 May 1919
- Renamed: 1902: Rivera, 1910: Emeline, 1920: Katharine R., 1927: Camina
- Stricken: circa 1920
- Home port: Brest, France; New London, Connecticut
- Fate: Sold on 9 October 1920 to a San Diego, California, buyer

General characteristics
- Type: steam yacht
- Tonnage: 408 GRT, 174 NRT
- Length: 196 ft (60 m) overall; 175.3 ft (53.4 m) registered
- Beam: 24.15 ft (7.36 m)
- Draft: 12 ft 6 in (3.81 m)
- Depth: 13.75 ft (4.19 m)
- Installed power: 105 NHP
- Propulsion: 1 × triple-expansion engine; 1 × screw
- Sail plan: schooner
- Speed: 10 kn (19 km/h)
- Complement: 72
- Armament: 2 × 3-inch (76 mm) guns

USS Emeline (SP-175) was a steam yacht acquired by the United States Navy in World War I. She was outfitted with military equipment, including 3-inch guns, and was commissioned as a patrol craft, assigned to protect shipping in the North Atlantic Ocean. She saved the lives of survivors of shipwrecks, and provided escort protection from German submarines for commercial ships. Post-war she was sold to the highest bidder, who had the yacht sail to San Diego, California, for delivery.

== Built in Scotland ==
Emeline (No. 175), a yacht, was built as Katoomba in 1898 by Ailsa Shipbuilding Company, Troon, Scotland; purchased by the US Navy 10 June 1917; and commissioned 14 July 1917.

== World War I service ==
=== Assigned to the North Atlantic Ocean ===
Emeline arrived at Brest, France, 30 August 1917, for patrol off Ushant and to escort convoys between English and French ports. She gave invaluable aid to ships in distress, rescuing survivors of:

- SS Spero, sunk on 2 November 1916 by U-69;
- SS Saracen, wrecked on the rocks off Les Platresses on 26 December;
- and survivors of the torpedoed SS John G. McCullough on 17 May 1918.

== Post-war decommissioning and sale ==
She returned to New London, Connecticut, after the war, was decommissioned at New York City 19 May 1919, and sold 9 October 1920 to her new owner, R.J. Robinson of San Diego, California.
