= USS Laura Reed =

Patrol vessel of the United States Navy

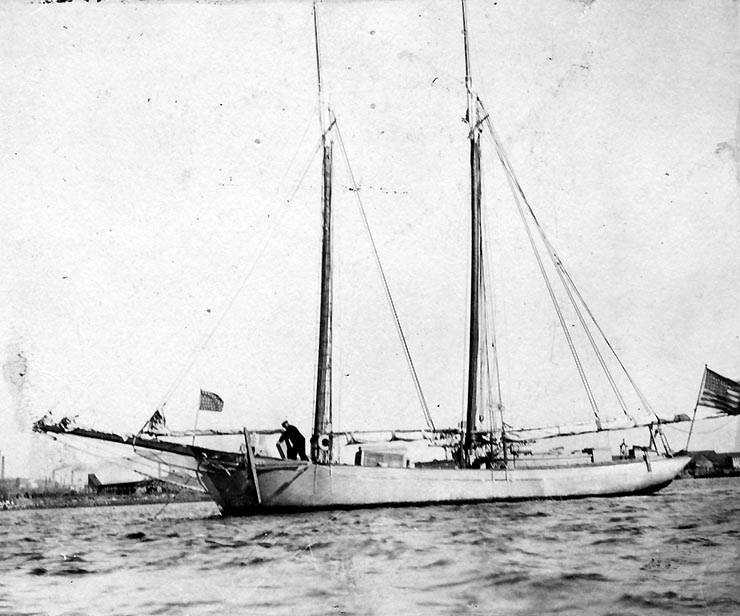
- USS Laura Reed (SP-2009) at anchor shortly after her commissioning, possibly in late 1917.

History

United States
- Name: USS Laura Reed
- Namesake: Previous name retained
- Completed: 1895
- Acquired: Chartered 27 November 1917; Delivered 3 December 1917
- Commissioned: 6 December 1917
- Fate: Returned to owner 7 January 1919
- Notes: Operated as civilian schooner Laura Reed 1895-1917 and from 1919

General characteristics
- Type: Patrol vessel
- Tonnage: 22 Gross register tons
- Length: 52 ft (16 m)
- Beam: 16 ft 2 in (4.93 m)
- Draft: 7 ft 6 in (2.29 m)
- Propulsion: Sails and auxiliary engine
- Speed: 5 knots
- Complement: 11
- Armament: None

USS Laura Reed (SP-2009), also listed as ID-2009, was a United States Navy patrol vessel in commission from 1917 to 1919.

Laura Reed was built as a civilian schooner of the same name in 1895 at Noank, Connecticut. On 27 November 1917, the U.S. Navy chartered her from her owner, Henry L. Galpin of New Haven, Connecticut, for use as a section patrol boat during World War I. She was enrolled in the Naval Coast Defense Reserve on 30 November 1917, delivered to the Navy on 3 December 1917, and commissioned as USS Laura Reed (SP-2009) at New Haven on 6 December 1917.

Assigned to the 3rd Naval District and based at New Haven, Laura Reed operated as a patrol boat and as a training ship for the Yale University Naval Unit for the rest of World War I.

The Navy returned Laura Reed to Galpin on 7 January 1919.
