= USS Maud =

Patrol vessel of the United States Navy

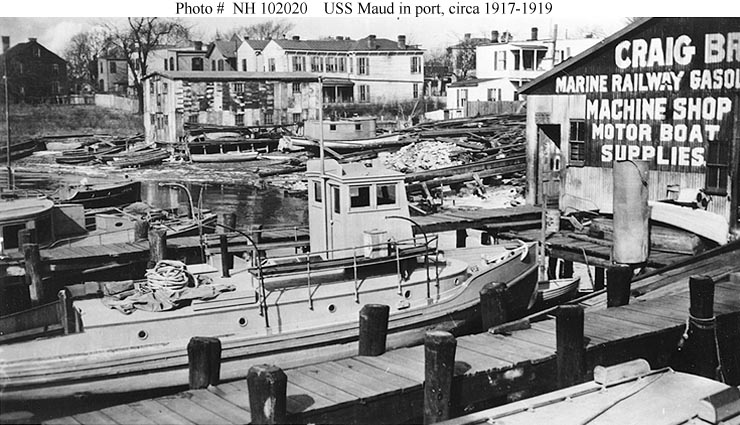
- USS Maud (SP-1009) sometime between 1917 and 1919. A pilothouse has been added to her for her naval service.

History

United States
- Name: USS Maud
- Namesake: Previous name retained
- Completed: See note
- Acquired: 15 June 1917
- Commissioned: 15 June 1917
- Fate: Returned to owner 7 January 1919
- Notes: Operated as private motorboat Maud until 1917 and from 1919

General characteristics
- Type: Patrol vessel
- Tonnage: 15 Gross register tons
- Length: 50 ft (15 m)
- Beam: 12 ft (3.7 m)
- Draft: 3 ft 3 in (0.99 m)
- Propulsion: Gasoline engine
- Speed: 9 knots
- Complement: 6
- Armament: None

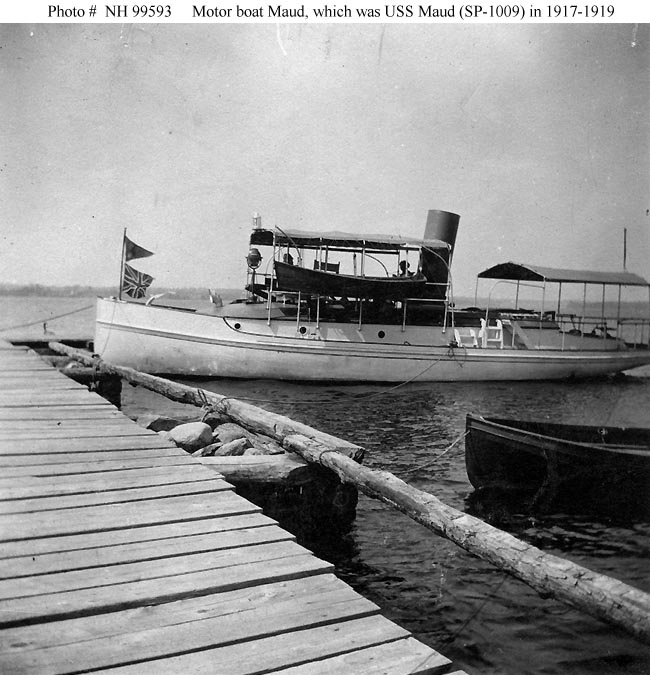
Maud as a private motorboat sometime prior to her United States Navy service.

USS Maud (SP-1009) was a United States Navy patrol vessel in commission from 1917 to 1919.

Maud was built as a private wooden motorboat of the same name. She was remodeled in 1913.

On 15 June 1917, the U.S. Navy acquired Maud under a free lease from her owner, W. H. Pattison, for use as a section patrol boat during World War I. She was commissioned the same day as USS Maud (SP-1009).

Assigned to the 5th Naval District, Maud operated in the Norfolk, Virginia, area for the rest of World War I. In addition to carrying out patrol duties, she served as a dispatch boat and on special services duties for the Commandant, 5th Naval District.

Maud was returned to Pattison on 7 January 1919.
