= USS Marija =

Patrol vessel of the United States Navy

History

United States
- Name: USS Marija
- Namesake: Previous name retained
- Builder: Edgar Young, Wilmington, North Carolina
- Acquired: 25 July 1917
- Commissioned: 27 July 1917
- Decommissioned: 14 March 1922
- Fate: Sold 6 June 1922
- Notes: Operated as private motorboat Marija until 1917

General characteristics
- Type: Patrol vessel
- Tonnage: 14 gross register tons
- Length: 46 ft (14 m)
- Beam: 11 ft (3.4 m)
- Draft: 3 ft (0.91 m) aft
- Speed: 8.5 knots
- Complement: 8
- Armament: 1 × 1-pounder gun; 1 × machine gun

USS Marija (SP-413) was a United States Navy patrol vessel in commission from 1917 to 1922.

Marija was built as a private motorboat of the same name by Edgar Young at Wilmington, North Carolina. On 25 July 1917, the U.S. Navy acquired her from her owner, R. P. McClanny, for use as a section patrol boat during World War I. She was commissioned as USS Marija (SP-413) on 27 July 1917.

Attached to the 6th Naval District, Marija operated on section patrol in and around Charleston, South Carolina, until 1922.

Marija was decommissioned on 14 March 1922 and sold to Whaley Whipple of Washington, D.C., on 6 June 1922.
