= USS Mary Pope =

Patrol vessel of the United States Navy

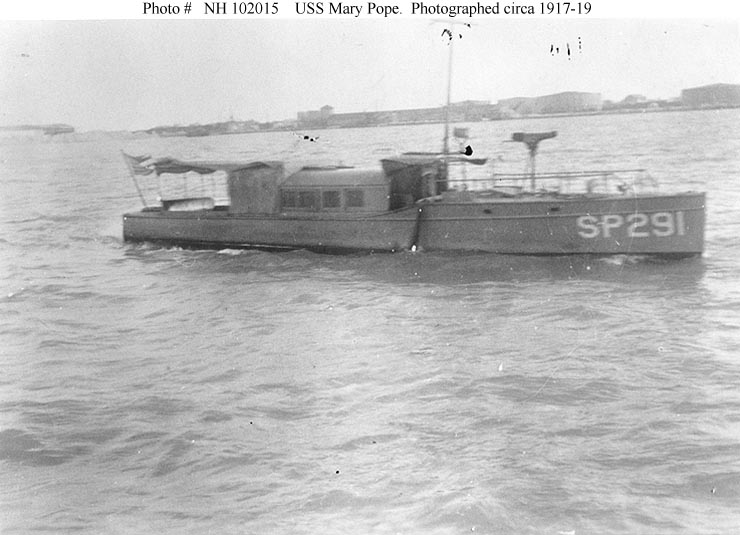
- USS Mary Pope sometime between 1917 and 1919.

History

United States
- Name: USS Mary Pope
- Namesake: Previous name retained
- Builder: Gas Engine and Power Company and Charles L. Seabury Company, Morris Heights, the Bronx, New York
- Completed: 1915
- Acquired: 7 July 1917
- Commissioned: 9 August 1917
- Stricken: 31 March 1919
- Fate: Wrecked 10 September 1919
- Notes: Operated as civilian motorboat Manitee, Madge, and Mary Pope 1915-1917

General characteristics
- Type: Patrol vessel
- Tonnage: 13 tons
- Length: 52 ft (16 m)
- Beam: 8 ft 5 in (2.57 m)
- Draft: 2 ft 7 in (0.79 m)
- Propulsion: Gasoline engine, one shaft
- Speed: 14.7 knots
- Complement: 4
- Armament: 1 × machine gun

USS Mary Pope (SP-291) was a United States Navy patrol vessel in commission from 1917 to 1919.

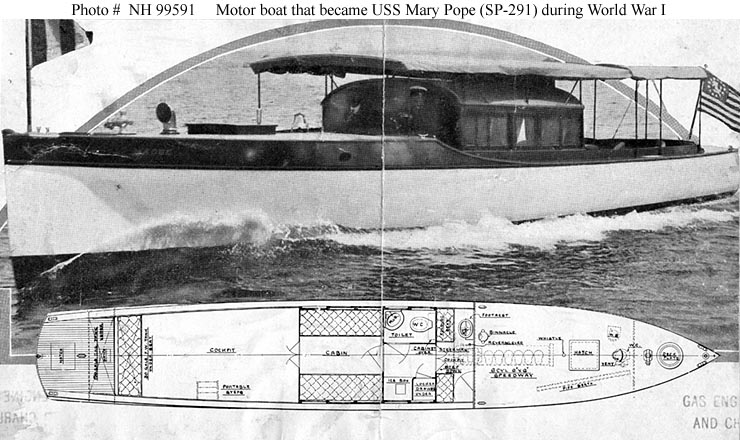
A photograph and interior general arrangement plan for the civilian motorboat that later became USS Mary Pope. This photograph probably was taken in 1915, when the boat was new and operating under her original name, Manitee.

Mary Pope was built as the civilian wooden-hulled motorboat Manitee in 1915 by the Gas Engine and Power Company and the Charles L. Seabury Company at Morris Heights in the Bronx, New York. She later was renamed Madge and then Mary Pope.

The U.S. Navy purchased Mary Pope from her owner, R. W. Bingham, on 7 July 1917 for World War I service as a patrol vessel. She was commissioned on 9 August 1917 as USS Mary Pope (SP-291).

Mary Pope operated on section patrol duties for the rest of World War I.

After the war, Mary Pope was stricken from the Navy List on 31 March 1919 and was put up for sale. She was at Key West, Florida, awaiting sale when she was destroyed by a hurricane on 10 September 1919.
