= Eliza Hayward (SP-1414) =

Patrol vessel of the United States Navy

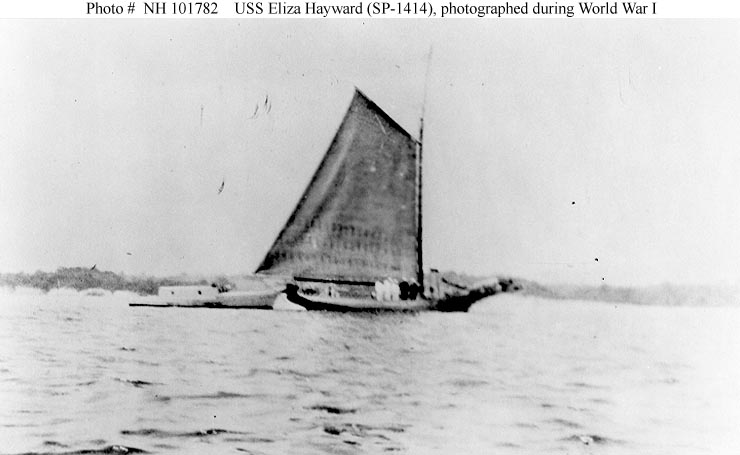
- Eliza Hayward during World War I, probably with a U.S. Navy crew aboard.

History

United States
- Name: Eliza Hayward
- Namesake: Previous name retained
- Acquired: 24 August 1917
- Fate: Returned to owner 24 September 1918
- Notes: Served in a non-commissioned status

General characteristics
- Type: Sloop
- Propulsion: Sails

Eliza Hayward (SP-1414) was a sloop that served in the United States Navy from 1917 to 1918.

The U.S. Navy acquired Eliza Hayward on 24 August 1917 for World War I service. She served in the 5th Naval District in a non-commissioned status for the next thirteen months.

The Navy returned Eliza Hayward to her owner on 24 September 1918.
