= USS Lady Thorne =

Patrol vessel of the United States Navy

History

United States
- Name: USS Lady Thorne
- Namesake: Previous name retained
- Completed: 1908
- Acquired: 22 June 1917
- Commissioned: 1917
- Decommissioned: 1 March 1918
- Fate: Returned to owner 1 March 1918
- Notes: Operated as private motorboat Lady Thorne until 1917 and from 1918

General characteristics
- Type: Patrol vessel
- Length: 44 ft (13 m)
- Beam: 10 ft (3.0 m)
- Draft: 6 ft 6 in (1.98 m)
- Propulsion: Gasoline engine
- Speed: 9.5 miles per hour or 9.5 knots
- Complement: 4
- Armament: 1 × 1-pounder gun

USS Lady Thorne (SP-962) was a United States Navy patrol vessel in commission from 1917 to 1918.

Lady Thorne was built as a private motorboat of the same name in 1908. On 22 June 1917, the U.S. Navy acquired her from her owner, R. C. Lamb of Elizabeth City, North Carolina, for use as a section patrol boat during World War I. She was enrolled in the Naval Coast Defense Reserve and commissioned as USS Lady Thorne (SP-962).

Assigned to the 5th Naval District, Lady Thorne served on patrol duties for the next several months.

Lady Thorne was decommissioned on 1 March 1918 and returned to Lamb the same day.
