= USS Margo =

Patrol vessel of the United States Navy

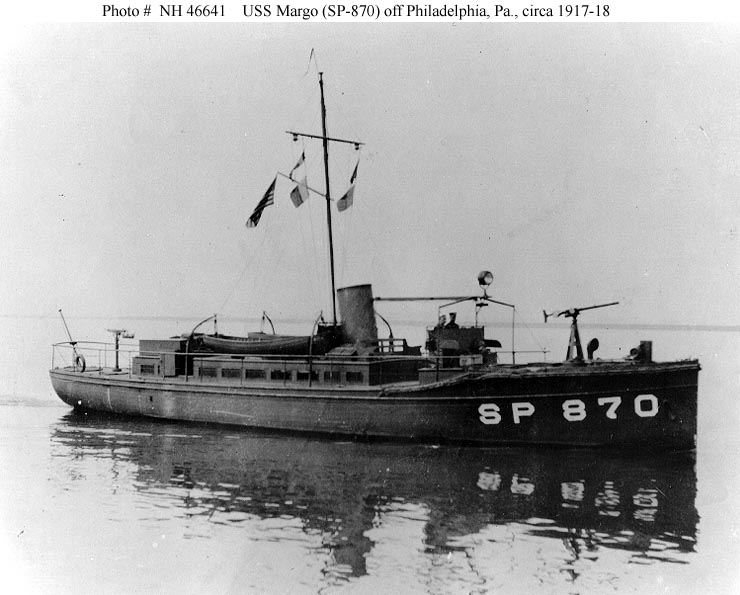
- USS Margo (SP-870) off Philadelphia, Pennsylvania, in 1917 or 1918.

History

United States
- Name: USS Margo
- Namesake: Previous name retained
- Owner: George H. McNeely
- Builder: Mathis Yacht Building Company, Camden, New Jersey
- Yard number: 33
- Completed: 1913
- Acquired: 14 June 1917
- Commissioned: 14 June 1917
- Identification: ON 211427, signal LCDF
- Fate: Returned to owner 4 December 1918, sold, renamed Pandora III, scrapped 1955
- Notes: Operated as private cruiser Margo 1913–1917 and from 1918

General characteristics
- Type: Section patrol vessel
- Tonnage: 34 Gross register tons
- Length: 65 ft (20 m)
- Beam: 14 ft (4.3 m)
- Draft: 3 ft 6 in (1.1 m)
- Speed: 8.6 knots (9.9 mph; 15.9 km/h)
- Complement: 11
- Armament: 1 × 1-pounder gun; 1 × machine gun

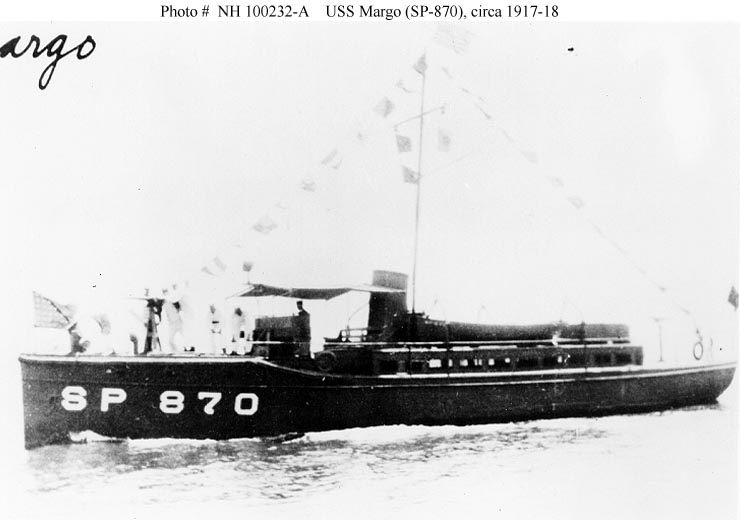
USS Margo (SP-870) sometime in 1917 or 1918.

USS Margo (SP-870) was a raised deck cruiser built for private use, taken into the United States Navy as a Section patrol vessel in commission from 1917 to 1918 and returned to the owner after the war.

== Private cruiser ==
Margo was designed by John Trumpy and built as a raised deck cruiser with one funnel and two masts in 1913 by the Mathis Yacht Building Company at Camden, New Jersey for George H. McNeely of Philadelphia. The motorboat was Mathis' hull number 33 and assigned the official number 211427 and signal letters LCDF on registration.

The cruiser's raised deck covered the crew quarters, designed for four, and extended as a trunk cabin over the engine room. The saloon was reached by stairway from the main deck. That space was 16 feet (4.9 m) in length with a long sofa with lockers flanked by buffets along the port side and Pullman berths on the starboard side. A mantle over a hot water radiator was at the forward end of the saloon with a door on the port side leading to a toilet and the one to starboard to a galley. The two berth owner's stateroom, furnished with easy chairs and rockers, was aft of the saloon. Owner's areas were finished in ivory white with mahogany trim.

Margo was powered by one Standard six-cylinder engine rated at 195 horsepower with a 200-gallon fuel capacity for an endurance of 500 miles at 8.6 knots (9.9 mph; 15.9 km/h). One electrical generating set driven by belt from the main engine provided a quarter kilowatt of power.

== World War I ==
On 14 June 1917, the U.S. Navy acquired her under a free lease from her owner, George H. McNeely of Philadelphia, Pennsylvania, for use as a Section patrol boat during World War I. She was commissioned the same day as USS Margo (SP-870).

Margo was assigned to the 4th Naval District and based at Philadelphia carrying out patrol duties in the Delaware River area for the rest of World War I and was returned to McNeely on 4 December 1918.

== Post war ==
The cruiser was sold, renamed Pandora III and was owned by several people in the New York area until scrapped in 1955.
