= USS Katherine K. =

Tugboat of the United States Navy

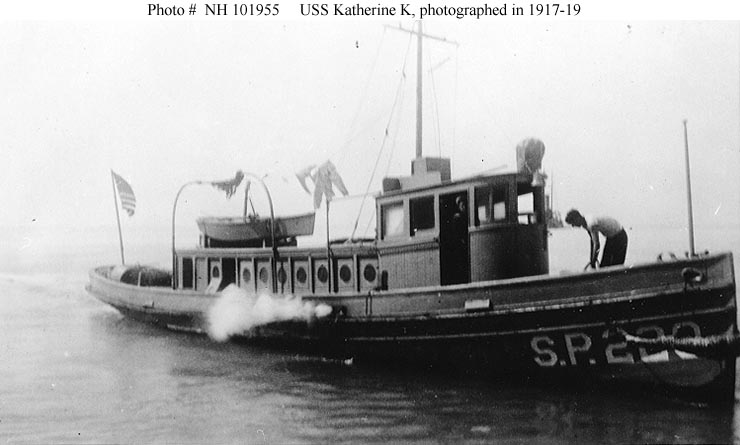
- USS Katherine K. during World War I.

History

United States
- Name: USS Katherine K.
- Namesake: Previous name retained
- Builder: M. D. Battomer, Baltimore, Maryland
- Completed: 1894
- Acquired: 9 June 1917; delivered 10 July 1917
- Commissioned: 7 September 1917
- Fate: Wrecked 9–10 September 1919
- Notes: Operated as civilian tugboat Katherine K. 1894-1917

General characteristics
- Type: Tug and patrol vessel
- Tonnage: 14 Gross register tons
- Length: 55 ft (17 m)
- Beam: 12 ft 4 in (3.76 m)
- Draft: 4 ft 2 in (1.27 m)
- Propulsion: Gasoline engine, one shaft
- Speed: 10 knots
- Armament: 2 × 1-pounder guns

USS Katherine K. (SP-220) was a United States Navy patrol vessel and tug in commission from 1917 to 1919.

== History ==
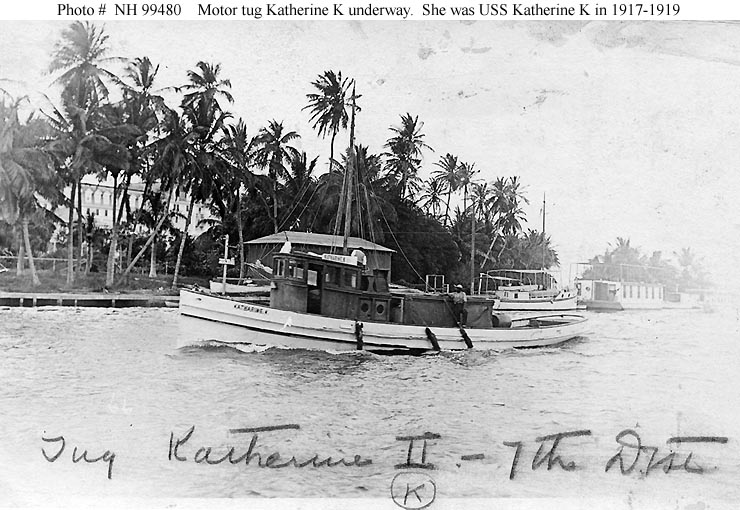
Katherine K. in civilian use in Florida sometime between 1894 and 1917.

Katherine K. was built as a civilian tug of the same name in 1894 by M. D. Battomer at Baltimore, Maryland. The U.S. Navy acquired Katherine K. from her owner, Samuel H. Freas of Miami, Florida on 9 June 1917 for World War I service as a tug and patrol vessel. She was enrolled in the Naval Coast Defense Reserve on 16 June 1917, delivered to the Navy at Key West, Florida, on 10 July 1917, and commissioned as USS Katherine K. (SP-220) on 7 September 1917.

Assigned as a section patrol ship to the 7th Naval District, Katherine K. patrolled the waters in and around Key West and served as a harbor tug and target-towing tug during World War I.

After the war, she was ordered transferred to the United States Coast Guard on 17 March 1919, but this transfer was canceled and on 21 May 1919 she was placed on the list of ships for sale by the Navy. Eugene E. Bates of Key West bought Katherine K., but she was swept away in the 1919 Florida Keys hurricane at Key West on 9–10 September 1919 before the Navy could deliver her to Bates.
