= USS Marie (SP-1260) =

Patrol vessel of the United States Navy

History

United States
- Name: USS Marie
- Namesake: Previous name retained
- Completed: 1901
- Acquired: Ordered taken over 4 April 1917
- Commissioned: 13 October 1917
- Stricken: 10 January 1919
- Fate: Returned to owner 10 January 1919
- Notes: Operated as private motorboat Marie 1901-1917 and from 1919

General characteristics
- Type: Patrol vessel
- Tonnage: 16 tons
- Length: 63 ft (19 m)
- Beam: 12 ft 6 in (3.81 m)
- Draft: 4 ft 6 in (1.37 m)
- Armament: 1 × 1-pounder gun

The second USS Marie (SP-1260) was an armed motorboat that served in the United States Navy as a patrol vessel from 1917 to 1919.

Marie was built as a civilian motorboat in 1901. She was ordered to be taken over by the U.S. Navy from her owner, O. L. Owens, on 4 April 1917 for use as a patrol boat during World War I. The Navy commissioned her on 13 October 1917 as USS Marie (SP-1260).

Assigned to the 5th Naval District, Marie performed patrol duty out of Norfolk, Virginia, for the remainder of World War I.

Marie was stricken from the Navy List and returned to Owens on 10 January 1919.

Throughout her time in service, Marie (SP-1260) was one of two U.S. Navy ships in commission with the name USS Marie, the other being patrol boat USS Marie (SP-100).
