= USS Maria J. Carlton =

Union schooner during the American Civil War

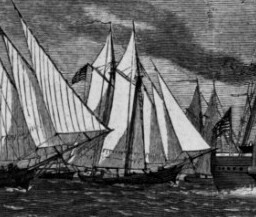
- Maria J. Carlton (center) and other ships of the Mortar Flotilla

History

United States
- Name: Maria J. Carlton
- Acquired: October 15, 1861
- Commissioned: January 29, 1862
- Fate: Sunk April 19, 1862

General characteristics
- Displacement: 178 tons
- Length: 98 ft (30 m)
- Beam: 27 ft (8.2 m)
- Draught: 7 ft 8 in (2.34 m)
- Complement: 28
- Armament: one 13-inch (33 cm) mortar; two 12-pounder rifled howitzers

USS Maria J. Carlton was a schooner acquired by the United States Navy on October 15, 1861, during the American Civil War. Built before the war, the vessel was converted into a mortar schooner by the Navy. She was then transferred to the mouth of the Mississippi River in early 1862, as part of a force tasked with neutralizing Confederate forts guarding New Orleans, Louisiana. Maria J. Carlton participated in the Battle of Forts Jackson and St. Philip on April 18, but, the battle continuing, was sunk the next day by a shot from Fort Jackson. She was the only Union warship sunk solely by artillery fire from Confederate forts on the Mississippi River during the war.

== Construction and characteristics ==
According to naval historian Paul Silverstone, the schooner Maria J. Carlton had been built in Philadelphia, Pennsylvania, before the American Civil War and launched at an unknown date. However, naval historian Craig W. Gaines states she was built in 1859 at Saybrook, Connecticut, while an 1862 account in the Baltimore Sun states she was built in 1856 in East Haddam, Connecticut, from white oak and chestnut wood. She was 98 feet (30 m) long, had a beam of 27 feet (8.2 m), and a draft of 7 feet 8 inches (2.34 m), with a tonnage of 178 tons. Maria J. Carlton was used as part of the packet trade between New York City and Boston, Massachusetts. On October 15, 1861, the United States Navy purchased Maria J. Carlton from a Mr. Warner at Middletown, Connecticut; the previous name remained in use after the Navy took over. After the purchase, Maria J. Carlton was sent to the New York Navy Yard in Brooklyn to be converted for military use. During her Navy service, she had a crew of 28 and was armed with a 13-inch (33 cm) mortar and two 12-pounder howitzers. She was then commissioned on January 29, 1862; her commander was Acting Master Charles E. Jack.

== Service history ==
After her commissioning, Maria J. Carlton was assigned to the Mortar Flotilla, which was tasked with helping neutralize Confederate forts guarding New Orleans, Louisiana, which was the largest and wealthiest city in the Confederacy. In mid-February, she began moving towards the mouth of the Mississippi River, and lost her mainmast, rigging, and sails in a gale off of Cape Hatteras. Using a jury mast, the vessel was able to make it to Key West, where she joined the Mortar Flotilla under David Dixon Porter by March 2. Traveling via Ship Island, Maria J. Carlton moved through Pass a Loutre on March 18, and entered the Mississippi River Delta, working with only one mast.

On April 18, the vessel and the rest of the Mortar Flotilla were present at the start of the Battle of Forts Jackson and St. Philip. Porter's fleet was subdivided into smaller commands, with Maria J. Carlton assigned to the 2nd Division of the flotilla, which was commanded by Lieutenant Walter W. Queen, along with five other vessels. With the battle opening, the 2nd Division moved to the east side of the Mississippi, and opened fire on Fort Jackson at a range of a minimum of 3,680 yards (3.36 km). As Confederate fire began to fall among Queen's ships, several were damaged. The mortar schooners USS T. A. Ward and USS George Mangham were both damaged, with the former having to temporarily withdraw from the fight. Firing continued until nightfall, although Fort Jackson ceased replying by 17:00. Both sides resumed the action on April 19, with Queen's vessels opening fire at 08:30 after shifting to the other side of the river in an attempt to avoid damage. Maria J. Carlton was struck at 10:00. The shot went through the quarterdeck, knocked away some lines, passed through the magazine, and exited through the side of the ship, tearing a hole through it. Two or three men on the ship were wounded, but the entire crew of the ship was saved by being brought off by boats from the rest of the fleet and many of the ship's supplies were reported to have been saved. Union ships commanded by David Glasgow Farragut passed Fort Jackson and Fort St. Philip on April 24. Maria J. Carlton's wreck was destroyed on April 25 by Union forces. The two forts surrendered on April 28. Maria J. Carlton was the only Union warship sunk solely by artillery fire from Confederate forts on the Mississippi River during the war.

== Sources ==
- Chatelain, Neil P. (2020). Defending the Arteries of Rebellion: Confederate Naval Operations in the Mississippi River Valley, 1861–1865. El Dorado Hills, California: Savas Beatie. ISBN 978-1-61121-510-6.
- Gaines, W. Craig (2008). Encyclopedia of Civil War Shipwrecks. Baton Rouge, Louisiana: Louisiana State University Press. ISBN 978-0-8071-3274-6.
- Hearn, Chester G. (1995). The Capture of New Orleans 1862. Baton Rouge, Louisiana: Louisiana State University Press. ISBN 0-8071-1945-8.
- Kennedy, Frances H., ed. (1998). The Civil War Battlefield Guide (2nd ed.). Boston/New York: Houghton Mifflin. ISBN 978-0-395-74012-5.
- Official Records of the Union and Confederate Navies in the War of the Rebellion. Vol. 18. Washington, D. C.: Government Printing Office. 1904.
- Silverstone, Paul H. (2006). Civil War Navies 1855–1883. New York: Routledge. ISBN 978-0-415-97870-5.
