= USS Marie (SP-100) =

Patrol vessel of the United States Navy

History

United States
- Name: USS Marie
- Namesake: Previous name retained
- Builder: Seabury's, Morris Heights, New York
- Completed: 1912
- Acquired: 28 April 1917 (delivered 1 May 1917)
- Commissioned: 15 June 1917
- Stricken: 6 August 1919
- Fate: Sold 2 October 1919
- Notes: Operated as private motorboat Marie 1912-1917

General characteristics
- Type: Patrol vessel
- Tonnage: 251 tons
- Length: 70 ft 3 in (21.41 m)
- Beam: 11 ft 6 in (3.51 m)
- Draft: 3 ft 6 in (1.07 m)
- Speed: 16.75 knots
- Armament: 1 × 3-pounder gun; 2 × machine guns

The first USS Marie (SP-100) was an armed motorboat that served in the United States Navy as a patrol vessel from 1917 to 1919.

Marie was built as a civilian motorboat in 1912 by Seabury's at Morris Heights, New York. The U.S. Navy acquired her on 28 April 1917 from her owner, O. M. Pynchon, for use as a patrol boat during World War I. The Navy took delivery of her on 1 May 1917 and commissioned her on 15 June 1917 as USS Marie (SP-100).

Marie was assigned to the section patrol, and performed patrol duty for the remainder of World War I.

On 6 August 1919, Marie was stricken from the Navy List. She was sold on 2 October 1919 to E. J. Steiner.

From October 1917 until January 1919, Marie (SP-100) was one of two U.S. Navy ships in commission with the name USS Marie, the other being patrol boat USS Marie (SP-1260).
