= USS Etta M. Burns =

Patrol vessel of the United States Navy

History

United States
- Name: USS Etta M. Burns
- Namesake: Previous name retained
- Completed: 1902
- Acquired: 1917
- Commissioned: 2 June 1917
- Stricken: 3 February 1919
- Fate: Returned to owner 1919
- Notes: Operated as civilian schooner 1902-1917 and from 1919

General characteristics
- Type: Patrol vessel
- Tonnage: 40 gross register tons
- Length: 60 ft (18 m)
- Beam: 18 ft 4 in (5.59 m)
- Draft: 8 ft (2.4 m)
- Propulsion: Sails plus auxiliary engine
- Speed: 7 kn (13 km/h; 8.1 mph)
- Complement: 13

USS Etta M. Burns (SP-542) was a United States Navy patrol vessel in commission from 1917 to 1919.

Etta M. Burns was built as a civilian schooner in 1902. In 1917, the U.S. Navy leased her for use as a section patrol vessel during World War I. She was commissioned as USS Etta M. Burns (SP-542) on 2 June 1917.

Assigned to the 1st Naval District, Etta M. Burns operated on patrol duties in northern New England for the rest of World War I.

Etta M. Burns was stricken from the Navy List on 3 February 1919 and returned to her owner.
