= USS Ellen (SP-284) =

Patrol vessel of the United States Navy

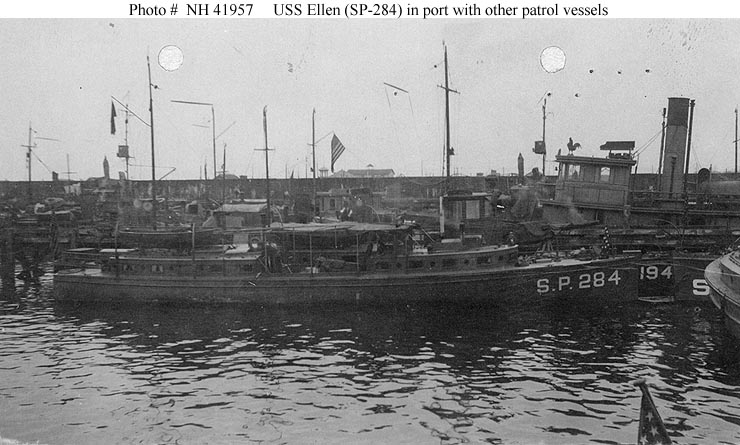
- USS Ellen, probably in the New York City area.

History

United States
- Name: USS Ellen
- Namesake: Previous name retained
- Completed: 1911 or 1915
- Acquired: Either on or before 10 May 1917 or on 14 May 1917
- Commissioned: Either placed in non-commissioned service 10 May 1917 or commissioned on 10 August 1917
- Fate: Either returned to owner sometime after 31 May 1918 or sold on 30 April 1919
- Notes: Operated as civilian yacht Ellen from 1911 or 1915 until 1917

General characteristics
- Type: Patrol vessel
- Length: Either 42 ft (13 m) or 67 ft 10 in (20.68 m)

The second USS Ellen (SP-284) was a United States Navy patrol vessel in commission from 1917 until 1918 or 1919. Sources differ on most aspects of her history and even on her physical characteristics.

Ellen was built as a civilian motorboat of the same name either in 1911 at Staten Island, New York, or in 1915 at Greenport, New York on Long Island. The U.S. Navy acquired her from her owner either on or before 10 May 1917 or on 14 May 1917 for World War I service as a patrol vessel. She served in the Navy as USS Ellen (SP-284), but sources differ as to whether she served in a non-commissioned status throughout her Navy career and was placed in service on 10 May 1917 or was commissioned on 10 August 1917.

Assigned to the 3rd Naval District, Ellen operated on section patrol duties in the New York City area for the rest of her naval career.

Sources differ on the timing and nature of the end of Ellen's naval service. She either was placed out of service on 31 May 1918 and returned to her owner or remained in service through the end of World War I and was sold postwar on 30 April 1919.

Ellen should not be confused with USS Ellen (SP-1209), later USS SP-1209, another patrol vessel in commission at the same time.

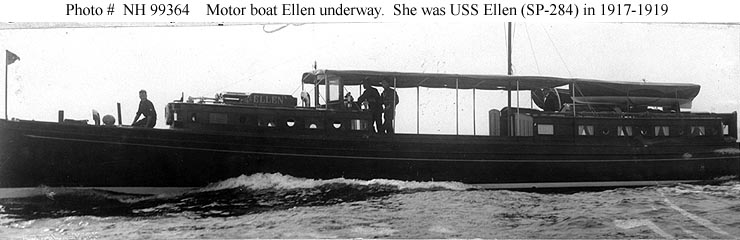
Ellen in 1917.
