= South Montrose, Pennsylvania =

Unincorporated community in Pennsylvania, US

- Unincorporated community
- Location within Pennsylvania
- Coordinates: 41°47′50″N 75°53′29″W
- Country: United States
- State: Pennsylvania
- County: Susquehanna
- Elevation: 1,644 ft (501 m)

Population
  - Estimate (2023): 187
- Time zone: UTC-5 (Eastern (EST))
  - Summer (DST): UTC-4 (EDT)
- ZIP code: 18843
- Area codes: 272 & 570
- GNIS feature ID: 1188088

South Montrose is an unincorporated community in Susquehanna County, Pennsylvania, United States. The community is located along Pennsylvania Route 29, 2.6 miles (4.2 km) south-southwest of Montrose. South Montrose has a post office with ZIP code 18843.

== Demographics ==
Historical population
Census	Pop.	Note	%±
2023 (est.)	187

The United States Census Bureau defined South Montrose as a census designated place (CDP) in 2023.
