= USS Maria Denning =

Cargo ship of the United States Navy

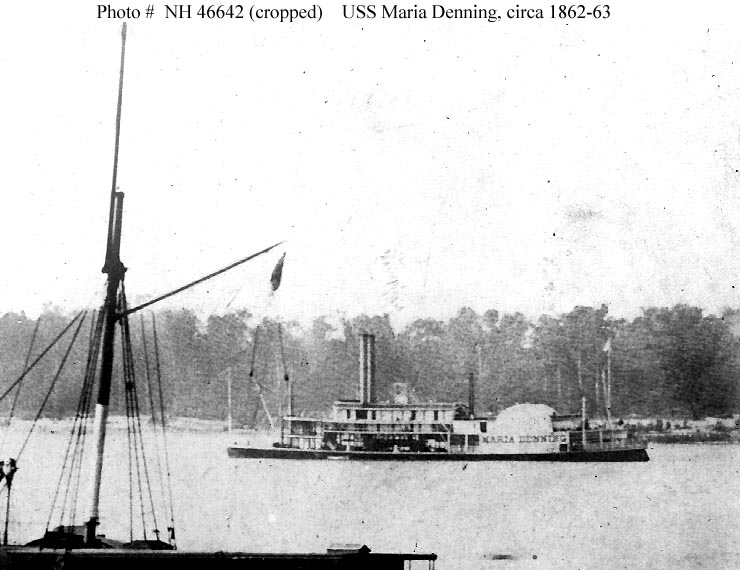
- USS Maria Denning and USS General Bragg.

History

United States
- Launched: 1858
- Acquired: 1861
- In service: 1861
- Out of service: December 1862
- Stricken: 1862 (est.)
- Fate: Transferred to the Union Army; in December 1862

General characteristics
- Displacement: 870 tons
- Propulsion: Steam engine side wheel-propelled
- Armour: Wood

USS Maria Denning was a steamer acquired by the Union Navy during the American Civil War. She was used by the Union Navy for various tasks, including carrying supplies, prisoners of war, and acting as a receiving ship for newly enlisted sailors or for sailors whose ship was sunk.

Sidewheel steamer Maria Denning, built at Cincinnati, Ohio, in 1858, was purchased by the Navy in 1861 for service as a transport, Comdr. Benjamin H. Dove in command.

== A diversified role for an auxiliary ship ==
Destined to carry provisions and stores, Maria Denning arrived at Cairo, Illinois, from St. Louis, Missouri, 26 November 1861, having dispersed two to four hundred Confederate cavalry at Price’s Landing en route. She was used as receiving ship at Cairo from 3 November 1861 to 1 April 1862, and protected Fort Holt from night attack by Confederate gunboats early in December 1861.

In November 1862, Maria Denning took prisoners on board at Helena, Arkansas, before departing for Vicksburg, Mississippi.

== Transferred to the Union Army as a transport vessel ==
She was transferred to the Union Army in December 1862 and served as an Army transport 15 December 1862 to 6 April 1863. She then returned to civilian pursuits, which lasted until she burned at Algiers, Louisiana, on May 11, 1866.
