= USS Margaret (SP-328) =

Trawler, converted to a minesweeper

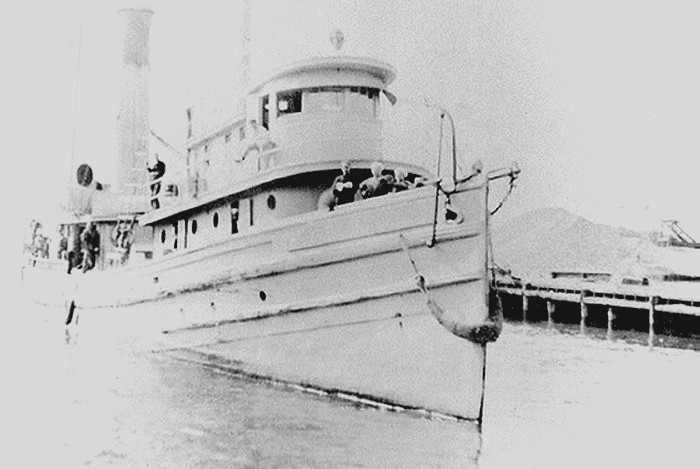
- USS Margaret (SP-328) photographed c. 1917–19.

History

United States
- Name: Margaret (1912—1918); SP-328 (1918-1919); Margaret (1919 at least 1968)
- Namesake: Margaret Bellows, youngest daughter of Joseph Foster Bellows of Bellows & Squires Company.
- Owner: Bellows & Squires Company (1912—1918); U.S. Navy (1918–1919); Douglas Company (1919-?); Reedville Oil and Guano Company (?- at least 1968)
- Builder: Humphreys Marine Railways, Weems, Virginia
- Completed: 1912
- Commissioned: 21 May 1917
- Decommissioned: c. 1919
- Renamed: renamed USS SP-328 in 1918 to avoid confusion with another Navy ship named Margaret
- Stricken: c. 1919
- Identification: U.S. Official Number: 209747
- Status: Active 1968

General characteristics
- Type: menhaden fishing trawler
- Tonnage: 273 GRT, 185 NRT
- Displacement: 468 tons (full load)
- Length: 128 ft (39.0 m) LOA; 120 ft (36.6 m) LBP
- Beam: 23 ft 4 in (7.1 m)
- Draft: 9 ft (2.7 m) (mean); 11 ft 4 in (3.5 m) ("Navigagion")
- Installed power: Steam, 1 double ended boiler; 1 × 5.5 kw 115 v Crocker-Wheeler electric generating set
- Propulsion: Vertical compound steam engine, 375 ihp
- Speed: 9.5 kn (10.9 mph; 17.6 km/h)
- Complement: 3 officers, 30 men
- Crew: 31 (fishing)
- Armament: WW I: 1 × 6-pounder gun; WW II: 1 × 6-pounder gun, 2 × 20mm, 2 × short depth charge tracks

USS Margaret (SP-328) was a menhaden fishing trawler acquired by the U.S. Navy during World War I. She was configured by the Navy as a Section mine sweeper. Postwar she was sold, resuming commercial fishing as Margaret. With World War II the vessel was acquired by the U.S. Coast Guard, serving from December 1942 to June 1943 as an emergency manned vessel. Margaret resumed menhaden fishing and was shown as active in the U.S. register as late as 1968.

== Commercial fishing ==
Margaret was a wood-hulled menhaden fishing trawler built in 1912 by Humphreys Marine Railways (Note: The Navy record shows Henry Brusstar. Brusstar, of Baltimore, purchased the yard in 1906 but it had been acquired by H. R. Humphreys and reorganized by 1912.) for Bellows & Squires Company. Joseph Foster Bellows and George P. Squires had joined Humphreys in taking over the marine railway construction firm in 1912 to build their menhaden fishing fleet.

The 1913 U.S. registry shows Margaret, U.S. Official Number 209747, as engaged in fishing with a registered crew of 31 with registry port of Tappahannock, Virginia.

The vessel was named for the youngest daughter of the company's Joseph Foster Bellows and became one of his favorites of the company fleet.

== Navy service ==
Margaret was acquired from Bellows & Squires Company for $90,000 and simultaneously commissioned on 21 May 1917. The Navy took all but two of the company's fleet as mine sweepers, the others being George H. Bradley III, Joseph F. Bellows, Little Joe, David K Phillips, Elizabeth Froelich, and George P. Squires. Margaret was renamed SP-328 in 1918 to avoid confusion with another Navy ship named Margaret.

== Postwar disposition ==
Following the Armistice ending World War I SP-328 and the other boats of the Bellows & Squires Company were sold at auction. The company had built replacements at the yard in which it held interests and, fearing damage to engines, did not bid on any of the boats. Margaret was sold to the Douglas Company, Reedville, Virginia, on or about 4 April 1919.

At some point Margaret, converted to diesel, was sold to the Reedville Oil and Guano Company. The registers for 1928 and 1930 show the vessel operating for the Douglas Company of Reedville, Virginia, engaged in fishing. (Note: The NavSource information that the ship was registered in 1927 to the National Oil Co. of Norfolk, VA as the freighter National II does not appear to be supported by the register.) On 28 December 1942 Margaret was chartered for $850 a month by the U.S. Coast Guard, converted at a cost of $115,200 and commissioned as the emergency manned (EM) USCGC EM Margaret (WYP 323). The vessel did patrol duty based from Cape May, New Jersey, until decommissioned 7 June 1943 and returned to the owner 24 June 1943.

Margaret is shown as registered and active as a fishing vessel in the 1968 U.S. register.

== See also ==
- Reedville, Virginia
- Section patrol
