= USS Margaret (SP-531) =

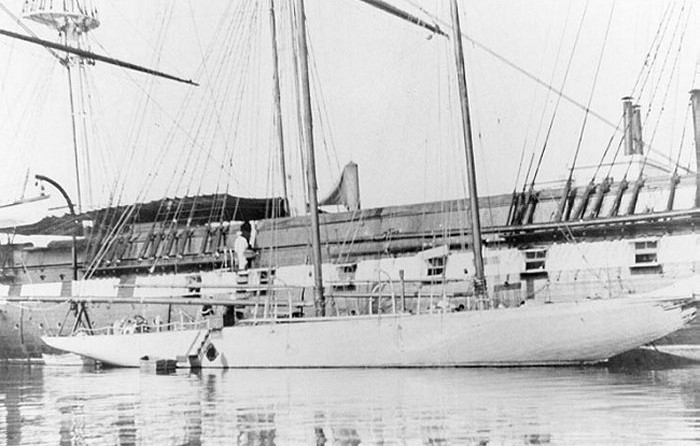
- Margaret (U.S. Auxiliary Schooner, 1903) alongside USS Constellation, probably at Newport, Rhode Island, c. 1917.

History

United States
- Name: USS Margaret
- Laid down: date unknown
- Launched: date unknown
- Christened: as the yacht Savarona I
- Completed: 1903 at Boston, Massachusetts
- Commissioned: 16 May 1917 as USS Margaret (SP-531)
- Decommissioned: c. 1919
- Renamed: USS SP-531 in 1918
- Stricken: 27 September 1919
- Fate: Sold on 13 December 1919.

General characteristics
- Type: schooner
- Tonnage: 58 gross tons
- Length: not known
- Beam: not known
- Draft: not known
- Propulsion: not known
- Speed: not known
- Complement: not known
- Armament: not known

USS Margaret (SP-531) was a schooner acquired by the U.S. Navy for temporary service during World War I.

== World War I service ==
Margaret, a 58-gross-ton auxiliary schooner, was built in 1903 at Boston, Massachusetts, as the pleasure craft Savarona I. Acquired by the Navy for World War I service, she was commissioned in May 1917 as USS Margaret (SP-531) and renamed SP-531 the following year.

== Post-war decommissioning ==
She was decommissioned and stricken from the Naval Vessel Register in September 1919 and sold on 13 December 1919.
