= USS Ellen (SP-1209) =

Patrol vessel of the United States Navy

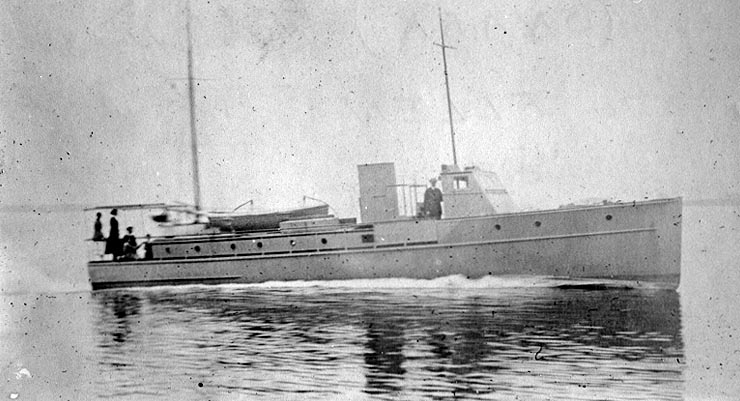
- A photograph of either Ellen or her sister ship Inca in 1917, prior to their United States Navy service; this photograph was used on data cards for both boats without distinguishing between them. Inca later served as patrol vessel USS Inca (SP-1212).

History

United States
- Name: USS Ellen (1917–1918); USS SP-1209 (1918–1919)
- Namesake: Ellen was her previous name retained; SP-1209 was her section patrol number
- Builder: Herreshoff Manufacturing Company, Bristol, Rhode Island
- Completed: 1917
- Acquired: 21 July 1917
- Commissioned: 2 August 1917
- Renamed: USS SP-1209 in 1918
- Fate: Returned to owner April 1919 Sank en route to Puerto Rico in 1959 or 1960
- Notes: Operated as civilian motorboat Ellen 1917 and from 1919

General characteristics
- Type: Patrol vessel
- Tonnage: 23 tons
- Length: 62 ft 4 in (19.00 m)

The third USS Ellen (SP-1209) was a United States Navy patrol vessel in commission from 1917 to 1919.

Ellen was built as a civilian motorboat of the same name in 1917 by the Herreshoff Manufacturing Company at Bristol, Rhode Island, one of nine motorboats built to a common design for private owners in anticipation that their owners would make them available for naval service. The U.S. Navy acquired Ellen from her owner on 21 July 1917 for World War I service as a patrol vessel. She was commissioned on 2 August 1917 as USS Ellen (SP-1209).

Ellen operated on section patrol duty for the rest of World War I. She was returned to her owner in April 1919.

Ellen should not be confused with USS Ellen (SP-284), another patrol vessel in commission at the same time.
