= USS Maria A. Wood =

Gunboat of the United States Navy

History

United States
- Acquired: 21 September 1861
- Commissioned: 19 November 1861
- Decommissioned: 22 August 1866
- Fate: Sold, 6 September 1866

General characteristics
- Displacement: 344 tons
- Length: 125 ft (38 m)
- Beam: 28 ft 6 in (8.69 m)
- Draft: 9 ft (2.7 m)
- Propulsion: schooner sail
- Armament: two 32-pounder guns

USS Maria A. Wood was a schooner acquired by the Union Navy during the American Civil War. She was used by the Union Navy as a gunboat to patrol navigable waterways of the Confederacy to prevent the South from trading with other countries.

== Service history ==
The wooden sailing vessel Maria A. Wood was purchased at Philadelphia, Pennsylvania, 21 September 1861 and commissioned there 19 November 1861, Master Anthony Chase in command. Assigned to the West Gulf Blockading Squadron, Maria A. Wood arrived Fort Pickens, Pensacola, Florida, 17 December 1861 to assume patrol duties in the Gulf of Mexico. In West Pass early in 1862, she participated in the Union occupation of Pensacola 10 May. She was ordered to Santa Rosa Island 5 September to blockade East Pass, to the mouth of the Mississippi River in early November, and to Horn Island Pass in late November.

In January 1863, she was ordered to Philadelphia for repairs. Returning to the West Gulf Blockading Squadron in 1864, she operated off New Orleans, Louisiana, Pensacola, and Mobile Bay into 1865. She removed obstructions in Blakely Channel and Spanish River, near Mobile, Alabama, in April 1865 and remained in the gulf squadron after its cutback in October. Maria A. Wood sailed north early in 1866, decommissioned 22 August and was sold at New York City to W. H. Allen 6 September 1866.
