= USS Maria =

Tugboat of the US Navy

History

United States
- Name: Maria
- Builder: William Perrine, Williamsburg, Pennsylvania
- Launched: 1865
- Acquired: 11 April 1865
- Fate: Sunk, 4 January 1870

General characteristics
- Class & type: Tugboat
- Displacement: 170 tons
- Draft: 6 feet (1.8 m)

USS Maria was a small tugboat of the United States Navy. Ordered to support the Anaconda Plan during the American Civil War, she was commissioned to late to see action and was laid up. On 4 January 1870, she collided with USS Miantonomoh and sank off Massachusetts.

== Development and design ==
During the American Civil War, the Union Navy aimed to blockade the Confederate States into submission. To maneuver blockading warships, it needed a fleet of tugboats. By 1864, the existing fleet of small, wooden-hull, weak riverine boats were unsatisfactory. To address the issue, a series of iron-hull, propeller-driven tugboats were ordered. The largest design became the Fortune-class, which was ordered alongside a smaller and more shallow pair of tugboats: Maria and her sister ship Pilgrim. The duo had a displacement of 170 tons, an iron hull with a draft of 6 feet (1.8 m), and was propelled by a vertical compound steam engine that turned one a propeller to produce a top speed of 12 knots (22 km/h; 14 mph).

== Service history ==
The tugboat was built at the shipyard of William Perrine, in Williambsurg, Pennsylvania, and was launched in 1864. Maria was delivered to the Navy on 11 April 1865, after the war had ended. Over the next five years, she was primarily in ordinary at the New York Navy Yard. On 4 January 1870, she collided with USS Miantonomoh off Martha's Vineyard and sank.
