= USS Margaret (SP-524) =

Steam yacht used by the US Navy in World War I

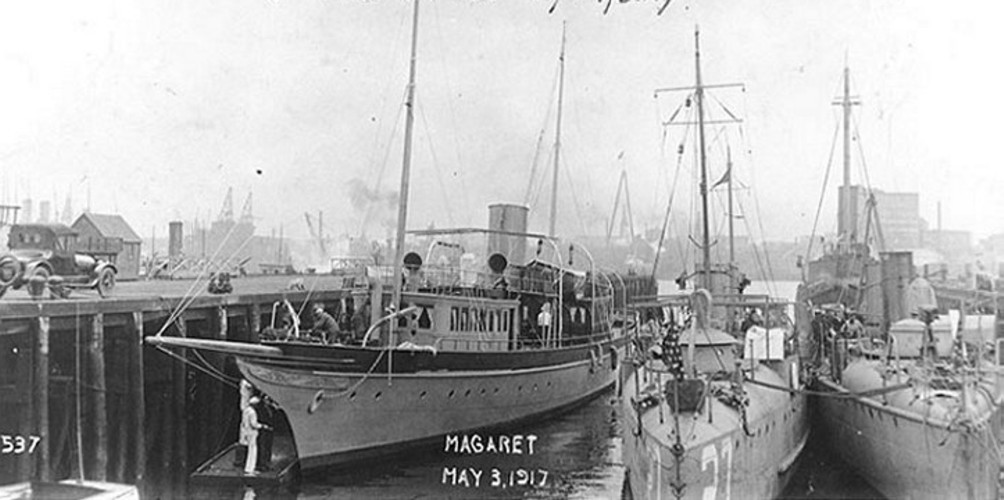
- Margaret at Boston in 1917, being converted for US Navy use

History

United States
- Name: 1914: Margaret; 1918: SP-524
- Owner: 1915: Charles A Stone; 1933: JE Kolf
- Operator: 1917: US Navy
- Port of registry: 1915: Boston; 1933: Chicago
- Builder: Gas Engine & Power Co & Charles L. Seabury Co, Morris Heights
- Completed: 1913
- Acquired: for the Navy, 28 April 1917
- Commissioned: 28 June 1917
- Decommissioned: 1919
- Identification: US official number 212172; 1917: pennant number SP-524

General characteristics
- Type: steam yacht
- Tonnage: 161 GRT, 109 NRT
- Length: 145 ft (44 m) overall; 113.5 ft (34.6 m) registered
- Beam: 18.2 ft (5.5 m)
- Draft: 6 ft 9 in (2.06 m)
- Depth: 9.8 ft (3.0 m)
- Installed power: 950 ihp
- Propulsion: 2 × triple-expansion engines; 2 × screws
- Speed: 14 knots (26 km/h)
- Complement: in US Navy: 29
- Crew: 1933: 14
- Armament: 1 × 3-pounder gun

USS Margaret (SP-524) was a steam yacht that was built in 1913. She was a United States Navy armed yacht from 1917 until 1919, when she was transferred to the United States Department of War. She was later sold back into civilian ownership, and was still registered as a merchant vessel in 1933.

== Building ==
The Gas Engine and Power Company and Charles L. Seabury Company of Morris Heights, Bronx, New York City built Margaret for Charles A Stone. She was completed in 1913. Her lengths were 145 ft (44 m) overall and 113.5 ft (34.6 m) registered. Her beam was 18.2 ft (5.5 m) and her depth was 9.8 ft (3.0 m). Her tonnages were 161 GRT and 109 NRT. She had twin screws, each driven by a three-cylinder triple-expansion engine. A single water-tube boiler supplied steam to both engines. Stone registered her in Boston. Her United States official number was 212172.

== US Navy service ==
The Navy acquired Margaret on 28 April 1917, and commissioned her on 28 June as USS Margaret, with the pennant number SP-524. In 1918 she was renamed SP-524, because there was more than one USS Margaret in the First World War.

== Post-war use ==
In the Spring of 1919 she was ordered to be sold, and on 4 December 1919 she was ordered to be inspected for sale. However, on 9 March 1920 she was transferred to the Department of War instead.

By 1933, a J.E. Kolf owned Margaret, and she was registered in Chicago.
