= USS Fiske =

Two ships of the United States Navy have borne the name USS Fiske, in honor of Rear Admiral Bradley A. Fiske.

- The first USS Fiske (DE-143), was an Edsall-class destroyer escort, launched in 1943 and sunk by a U-boat in 1944
- The second USS Fiske (DD-842), was a Gearing-class destroyer, launched in 1945 and struck in 1987. She was transferred to Turkey in 1981 and served as TCG Piyalepasa (D350) until she was scrapped in 1999
