= German submarine U-804 =

German World War II submarine

History

Nazi Germany
- Name: U-804
- Ordered: 7 December 1940
- Builder: Deutsche Schiff- und Maschinenbau AG Seebeckwerft, Bremerhaven
- Yard number: 362
- Laid down: 1 December 1942
- Launched: 1 April 1943
- Commissioned: 4 December 1943
- Fate: Sunk on 9 April 1945 in the Skagerrak west of Gothenburg, Sweden by rockets from RAF Mosquito aircraft (Sqdn 143 & 235). 55 dead (all hands lost).

General characteristics
- Class & type: Type IXC/40 submarine
- Displacement: 1,144 t (1,126 long tons) surfaced; 1,257 t (1,237 long tons) submerged
- Length: 76.76 m (251 ft 10 in) o/a; 58.75 m (192 ft 9 in) pressure hull
- Beam: 6.86 m (22 ft 6 in) o/a; 4.44 m (14 ft 7 in) pressure hull
- Height: 9.60 m (31 ft 6 in)
- Draught: 4.67 m (15 ft 4 in)
- Installed power: 4,400 PS (3,200 kW; 4,300 bhp) (diesels); 1,000 PS (740 kW; 990 shp) (electric)
- Propulsion: 2 shafts; 2 × diesel engines; 2 × electric motors
- Speed: 18.3 knots (33.9 km/h; 21.1 mph) surfaced; 7.3 knots (13.5 km/h; 8.4 mph) submerged
- Range: 13,850 nmi (25,650 km; 15,940 mi) at 10 knots (19 km/h; 12 mph) surfaced; 63 nmi (117 km; 72 mi) at 4 knots (7.4 km/h; 4.6 mph) submerged
- Test depth: 230 m (750 ft)
- Complement: 4 officers, 44 enlisted
- Armament: 6 × torpedo tubes (4 bow, 2 stern); 22 × 53.3 cm (21 in) torpedoes; 1 × 3.7 cm (1.5 in) Flak M42 AA gun; 2 x twin 2 cm (0.79 in) C/30 AA guns

Service record
- Part of: 4th U-boat Flotilla; 4 December 1943 – 30 June 1944; 10th U-boat Flotilla; 1 July – 30 September 1944; 33rd U-boat Flotilla; 1 October 1944 – 9 April 1945
- Identification codes: M 55 307
- Commanders: Oblt.z.S.d.R. Herbert Meyer; 4 December 1943 – 9 April 1945
- Operations: 2 patrols: 1st patrol: a. 19 June - 12 October 1944; b. 17 October 1944; 2nd patrol: 4 – 9 April 1945
- Victories: 1 warship sunk (1,300 tons)

German submarine U-804 was a Type IXC/40 U-boat of Nazi Germany's Kriegsmarine during World War II. U-804 was ordered on 7 December 1940, and was laid down on 1 December 1942 at Deutsche Schiff- und Maschinenbau AG Seebeckwerft, Bremerhaven as yard number 362. She was launched on 1 April 1943 and commissioned under the command of Oberleutnant zur See der Reserve Herbert Meyer (Crew III/37) on 4 December of that year.

== Design ==
German Type IXC/40 submarines were slightly larger than the original Type IXCs. U-804 had a displacement of 1,144 tonnes (1,126 long tons) when at the surface and 1,257 tonnes (1,237 long tons) while submerged. The U-boat had a total length of 76.76 m (251 ft 10 in), a pressure hull length of 58.75 m (192 ft 9 in), a beam of 6.86 m (22 ft 6 in), a height of 9.60 m (31 ft 6 in), and a draught of 4.67 m (15 ft 4 in). The submarine was powered by two MAN M 9 V 40/46 supercharged four-stroke, nine-cylinder diesel engines producing a total of 4,400 metric horsepower (3,240 kW; 4,340 shp) for use while surfaced, two Siemens-Schuckert 2 GU 345/34 double-acting electric motors producing a total of 1,000 shaft horsepower (1,010 PS; 750 kW) for use while submerged. She had two shafts and two 1.92 m (6 ft) propellers. The boat was capable of operating at depths of up to 230 metres (750 ft).

The submarine had a maximum surface speed of 18.3 knots (33.9 km/h; 21.1 mph) and a maximum submerged speed of 7.3 knots (13.5 km/h; 8.4 mph). When submerged, the boat could operate for 63 nautical miles (117 km; 72 mi) at 4 knots (7.4 km/h; 4.6 mph); when surfaced, she could travel 13,850 nautical miles (25,650 km; 15,940 mi) at 10 knots (19 km/h; 12 mph). U-804 was fitted with six 53.3 cm (21 in) torpedo tubes (four fitted at the bow and two at the stern), 22 torpedoes, and a 3.7 cm (1.5 in) Flak M42 as well as two twin 2 cm (0.79 in) C/30 anti-aircraft guns. The boat had a complement of forty-eight.

== Service history ==
=== Training ===
U-804 began training exercises with the 4th U-boat Flotilla on 4 December 1943, and finished her sea trials on 30 June 1944. On 16 June 1944, U-804 was attacked by a Norwegian Mosquito aircraft from No. 333 Squadron RAF, but succeeded in shooting down its attacker at the cost of eight crew members wounded; only minor damage was inflicted on the submarine. The two-man crew of the Mosquito was picked up by U-1000 on 18 June, and taken to occupied Norway.

=== First patrol ===
USS Fiske broken in two and sinking after being torpedoed by U-804

U-804 began her first war patrol on 19 June 1944 (while still undergoing training) with the 10th U-boat Flotilla. She left Bergen and headed into the North Sea, passing north of the British Isles into the North Atlantic, where she remained for 116 days. On 2 August, during a special hunt for several submarines known to be transmitting weather information from stations in the central and north Atlantic (of which effort U-804 was a part), two American destroyer escorts, USS Fiske and USS Douglas L. Howard, were detached from the task group to investigate the whereabouts of U-804, which both had made contact with. Upon sighting the destroyers, the U-boat quickly dived, but the two escorts detected her on their sonar and began their attack approach. Suddenly, USS Fiske was torpedoed on her starboard side by U-804, and within 10 minutes, she broke in two. Thirty-three of her men were killed and 50 were wounded, but all the survivors were rescued by USS Farquhar. Amidst the confusion following the sinking of USS Fiske, U-804 slipped away and returned to her patrol.

=== Second patrol & loss ===
On 12 October 1944, U-804 returned to the port of Flensburg after 116 days at sea. Five days later she left Flensburg for Kiel, where she remained until 4 April 1945 before leaving for occupied Norway. While en route in company with another of the flotilla's boats, U-1065, the two submarines were detected and attacked in the Skagerrak strait on 9 April 1945 by over 30 Mosquito aircraft from three Royal Air Force squadrons based at Banff. U-1065 succeeded in shooting down one of the attacking aircraft before being hit by several rockets fired by 10 Mosquitos from 143 and 235 Squadrons; she exploded and sank with the loss of her crew of 45 men.

U-804 suffered the same fate - after being hit by rockets from the attacking Mosquitos she also exploded and sank at 57°58′N 11°15′E, with no survivors from her crew of 55 men.

== Summary of raiding history ==
Date	Ship Name	Nationality	Tonnage (Note: Merchant ship tonnages are in gross register tons. Military vessels are listed by tons displacement.)	Fate
2 August 1944	USS Fiske	United States Navy	1,300	Sunk

== Bibliography ==
- Busch, Rainer; Röll, Hans-Joachim (1999). German U-boat commanders of World War II: a biographical dictionary. Translated by Brooks, Geoffrey. London, Annapolis, Md: Greenhill Books, Naval Institute Press. ISBN 1-55750-186-6.
- Busch, Rainer; Röll, Hans-Joachim (1999). Der U-Boot-Krieg, 1939-1945: Deutsche U-Boot-Verluste von September 1939 bis Mai 1945 [German U-boat losses from September 1939 to May 1945] (in German). Vol. IV. Hamburg, Berlin, Bonn: Mittler. ISBN 3-8132-0514-2.
- Gröner, Eric; Jung, Dieter; Maass, Martin (1991). German Warships 1815-1945: U-boats and Mine Warfare Vessels. Vol. 2. Translated by Thomas, Keith; Magowan, Rachel. London: Conway Maritime Press. ISBN 0-85177-593-4.
