= German submarine U-1065 =

German World War II submarine

Coordinates: 57°48′N 11°26′E

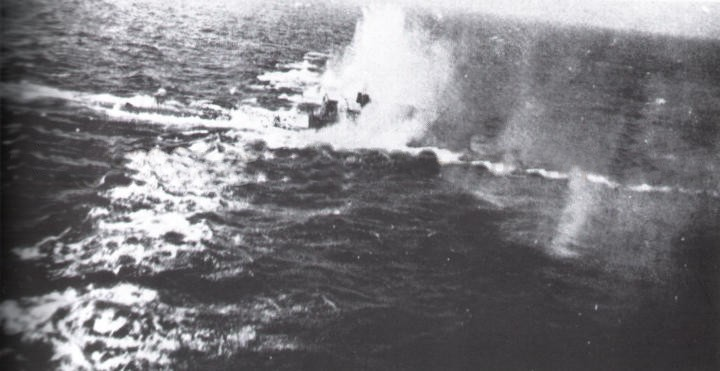
- U-1065 under air attack

History

Nazi Germany
- Name: U-1065
- Ordered: 14 October 1941
- Builder: Germaniawerft, Kiel
- Yard number: 702
- Laid down: 23 September 1943
- Launched: 3 August 1944
- Commissioned: 23 September 1944
- Fate: Sunk in air attack north-west of Gothenburg, Sweden on 9 April 1945

General characteristics
- Class & type: Type VIIC/41 submarine
- Displacement: 759 tonnes (747 long tons) surfaced; 860 t (846 long tons) submerged
- Length: 67.10 m (220 ft 2 in) o/a; 50.50 m (165 ft 8 in) pressure hull
- Beam: 6.20 m (20 ft 4 in) o/a; 4.70 m (15 ft 5 in) pressure hull
- Height: 9.60 m (31 ft 6 in)
- Draught: 4.74 m (15 ft 7 in)
- Installed power: 2,800–3,200 PS (2,100–2,400 kW; 2,800–3,200 bhp) (diesels); 750 PS (550 kW; 740 shp) (electric)
- Propulsion: 2 shafts; 2 × diesel engines; 2 × electric motors
- Speed: 17.7 knots (32.8 km/h; 20.4 mph) surfaced; 7.6 knots (14.1 km/h; 8.7 mph) submerged
- Range: 8,500 nmi (15,700 km; 9,800 mi) at 10 knots (19 km/h; 12 mph) surfaced; 80 nmi (150 km; 92 mi) at 4 knots (7.4 km/h; 4.6 mph) submerged
- Test depth: 230 m (750 ft); Calculated crush depth: 250–295 m (820–968 ft)
- Complement: 44-52 officers & ratings
- Armament: 5 × 53.3 cm (21 in) torpedo tubes (4 bow, 1 stern); 14 × torpedoes; 1 × 8.8 cm (3.46 in) deck gun (220 rounds); 1 × 3.7 cm (1.5 in) Flak M42 AA gun; 2 × 2 cm (0.79 in) C/30 AA guns

Service record
- Part of: 5th U-boat Flotilla; 23 September 1944 – 9 April 1945
- Identification codes: M 43 832
- Commanders: Oblt.z.S. Johannes Panitz; 23 September 1944 – 9 April 1945
- Operations: 1 patrol: 4 – 9 April 1945
- Victories: None

German submarine U-1065 was a Type VIIC/41 U-boat of Nazi Germany's Kriegsmarine during World War II.

She was ordered on 14 October 1941, and was laid down on 23 September 1943 at Friedrich Krupp Germaniawerft, Kiel, as yard number 702. She was launched on 3 August 1944 and commissioned under the command of Oberleutnant zur See Johannes Panitz on 23 September of that year.

== Design ==
German Type VIIC/41 submarines were preceded by the heavier Type VIIC submarines. U-1065 had a displacement of 759 tonnes (747 long tons) when at the surface and 860 tonnes (850 long tons) while submerged. She had a total length of 67.10 m (220 ft 2 in), a pressure hull length of 50.50 m (165 ft 8 in), a beam of 6.20 m (20 ft 4 in), a height of 9.60 m (31 ft 6 in), and a draught of 4.74 m (15 ft 7 in). The submarine was powered by two Germaniawerft F46 four-stroke, six-cylinder supercharged diesel engines producing a total of 2,800 to 3,200 metric horsepower (2,060 to 2,350 kW; 2,760 to 3,160 shp) for use while surfaced, two AEG GU 460/8–27 double-acting electric motors producing a total of 750 metric horsepower (550 kW; 740 shp) for use while submerged. She had two shafts and two 1.23 m (4 ft) propellers. The boat was capable of operating at depths of up to 230 metres (750 ft).

The submarine had a maximum surface speed of 17.7 knots (32.8 km/h; 20.4 mph) and a maximum submerged speed of 7.6 knots (14.1 km/h; 8.7 mph). When submerged, the boat could operate for 80 nautical miles (150 km; 92 mi) at 4 knots (7.4 km/h; 4.6 mph); when surfaced, she could travel 8,500 nautical miles (15,700 km; 9,800 mi) at 10 knots (19 km/h; 12 mph). U-1065 was fitted with five 53.3 cm (21 in) torpedo tubes (four fitted at the bow and one at the stern), fourteen torpedoes, one 8.8 cm (3.46 in) SK C/35 naval gun, (220 rounds), one 3.7 cm (1.5 in) Flak M42 and two 2 cm (0.79 in) C/30 anti-aircraft guns. The boat had a complement of between forty-four and sixty.

== Service history ==
U-1065 had a very short career. While she was commissioned on 23 September 1944, she was not assigned to a flotilla until 1 April 1945. She spent the intervening six months training with the 5th U-boat Flotilla. At the end of her training, she was formally assigned to the same flotilla. She began her first patrol on 4 April 1945, but was sunk after only six days at sea.

=== First patrol and loss ===
U-1065's first patrol took her from her home port of Kiel in northern Germany towards occupied Norway. However, while en route to Norway in company with another of the Flotilla's boats, U-804, the two submarines were detected and attacked in the Skagerrak strait by 34 de Havilland Mosquito aircraft from three separate Royal Air Force squadrons. During the attack, U-1065 was able to shoot down one of the Mosquitos with her anti-aircraft guns. However, she was then hit by several rockets from 10 separate Mosquitos from 143 and 235 Squadron; she exploded and sank with the loss of her entire crew of 45 men.

The accompanying vessel, U-804, was also hit by rockets from the Mosquitos during the altercation. She exploded and rapidly sank with the loss of her entire crew of 55 men.

== See also ==
- Battle of the Atlantic (1939-1945)

== Bibliography ==
- Busch, Rainer; Röll, Hans-Joachim (1999). German U-boat commanders of World War II : a biographical dictionary. Translated by Brooks, Geoffrey. London, Annapolis, Md: Greenhill Books, Naval Institute Press. ISBN 1-55750-186-6.
- Busch, Rainer; Röll, Hans-Joachim (1999). Deutsche U-Boot-Verluste von September 1939 bis Mai 1945 [German U-boat losses from September 1939 to May 1945]. Der U-Boot-Krieg (in German). Vol. IV. Hamburg, Berlin, Bonn: Mittler. ISBN 3-8132-0514-2.
- Gröner, Erich; Jung, Dieter; Maass, Martin (1991). German Warships 1815–1945, U-boats and Mine Warfare Vessels. Vol. 2. Translated by Thomas, Keith; Magowan, Rachel. London: Conway Maritime Press. ISBN 0-85177-593-4.
