= German submarine U-543 =

German Type IX C World War II submarine

Coordinates: 25°34′N 21°36′W

History

Nazi Germany
- Name: U-543
- Ordered: 5 June 1941
- Builder: Deutsche Werft, Hamburg
- Yard number: 364
- Laid down: 3 July 1942
- Launched: 3 February 1943
- Commissioned: 21 April 1943
- Fate: Sunk on 2 July 1944

General characteristics
- Class & type: Type IXC/40 submarine
- Displacement: 1,144 t (1,126 long tons) surfaced; 1,257 t (1,237 long tons) submerged
- Length: 76.76 m (251 ft 10 in) o/a; 58.75 m (192 ft 9 in) pressure hull
- Beam: 6.86 m (22 ft 6 in) o/a; 4.44 m (14 ft 7 in) pressure hull
- Height: 9.60 m (31 ft 6 in)
- Draught: 4.67 m (15 ft 4 in)
- Installed power: 4,400 PS (3,200 kW; 4,300 bhp) (diesels); 1,000 PS (740 kW; 990 shp) (electric)
- Propulsion: 2 shafts; 2 × diesel engines; 2 × electric motors
- Speed: 18.3 knots (33.9 km/h; 21.1 mph) surfaced; 7.3 knots (13.5 km/h; 8.4 mph) submerged
- Range: 13,850 nmi (25,650 km; 15,940 mi) at 10 knots (19 km/h; 12 mph) surfaced; 63 nmi (117 km; 72 mi) at 4 knots (7.4 km/h; 4.6 mph) submerged
- Test depth: 230 m (750 ft)
- Complement: 4 officers, 44 enlisted
- Armament: 6 × torpedo tubes (4 bow, 2 stern); 22 × 53.3 cm (21 in) torpedoes; 1 × 10.5 cm (4.1 in) SK C/32 deck gun (180 rounds); 1 × 3.7 cm (1.5 in) SK C/30 AA gun; 1 × twin 2 cm FlaK 30 AA guns

Service record
- Part of: 4th U-boat Flotilla; 21 April – 31 October 1943; 10th U-boat Flotilla; 1 November 1943 – 2 July 1944
- Identification codes: M 37 084
- Commanders: Kptlt. Hans-Jürgen Hellriegel; 21 April 1943 – 2 July 1944
- Operations: 2 patrols: 1st patrol: 9 November 1943 – 24 January 1944; 2nd patrol: 28 March – 2 July 1944
- Victories: None

German submarine U-543 was a Type IXC U-boat of Nazi Germany's Kriegsmarine during World War II.

She was laid down at the Deutsche Werft (yard) in Hamburg as yard number 364 on 3 July 1942, launched on 3 February and commissioned on 21 April with Kapitänleutnant Hans-Jürgen Hellriegel in command.

U-543 began her service career with training as part of the 4th U-boat Flotilla from 21 April 1943. She was reassigned to the 10th flotilla for operations on 1 November.

She carried out two patrols, but did not sink any ships. She was a member of three wolfpacks.

She was sunk on 2 July 1944 southwest of Tenerife by a Grumman TBM Avenger piloted by Ensign Frederick L. Moore, which flew off of American escort carrier USS Wake Island.

== Design ==
German Type IXC/40 submarines were slightly larger than the original Type IXCs. U-543 had a displacement of 1,144 tonnes (1,126 long tons) when at the surface and 1,257 tonnes (1,237 long tons) while submerged. The U-boat had a total length of 76.76 m (251 ft 10 in), a pressure hull length of 58.75 m (192 ft 9 in), a beam of 6.86 m (22 ft 6 in), a height of 9.60 m (31 ft 6 in), and a draught of 4.67 m (15 ft 4 in). The submarine was powered by two MAN M 9 V 40/46 supercharged four-stroke, nine-cylinder diesel engines producing a total of 4,400 metric horsepower (3,240 kW; 4,340 shp) for use while surfaced, two Siemens-Schuckert 2 GU 345/34 double-acting electric motors producing a total of 1,000 shaft horsepower (1,010 PS; 750 kW) for use while submerged. She had two shafts and two 1.92 m (6 ft) propellers. The boat was capable of operating at depths of up to 230 metres (750 ft).

The submarine had a maximum surface speed of 18.3 knots (33.9 km/h; 21.1 mph) and a maximum submerged speed of 7.3 knots (13.5 km/h; 8.4 mph). When submerged, the boat could operate for 63 nautical miles (117 km; 72 mi) at 4 knots (7.4 km/h; 4.6 mph); when surfaced, she could travel 13,850 nautical miles (25,650 km; 15,940 mi) at 10 knots (19 km/h; 12 mph). U-543 was fitted with six 53.3 cm (21 in) torpedo tubes (four fitted at the bow and two at the stern), 22 torpedoes, one 10.5 cm (4.13 in) SK C/32 naval gun, 180 rounds, and a 3.7 cm (1.5 in) SK C/30 as well as a 2 cm (0.79 in) C/30 anti-aircraft gun. The boat had a complement of forty-eight.

== Service history ==
=== First patrol ===
The boat departed Kiel on 9 November 1943, moved through the North Sea, negotiated the gap between Iceland and the Faroe Islands and into the Atlantic Ocean. She entered Lorient, on the French Atlantic coast, on 24 January 1944.

=== Second patrol and loss ===
Her second foray took her west of Portugal where she found a small convoy on 9 April 1944, but she was driven off by depth charges from the escorts.

After refuelling from U-488, the boat was attacked on 19 April by a TBM Avenger with rockets and a FIDO homing torpedo. The aircraft had come from the USS Tripoli. The submarine escaped undamaged and sailed to the west coast of Africa, then across the central Atlantic to the waters off Brazil.

She was sunk on 2 July 1944 on the return leg west of Portugal by an Avenger, this time from USS Wake Island. The same mix of rockets and a FIDO were used, but were successful.

Fifty-eight men died; there were no survivors.

=== Wolfpacks ===
U-543 took part in three wolfpacks, namely:

- Coronel (4 – 8 December 1943)
- Coronel 2 (8 – 14 December 1943)
- Coronel 3 (14 – 17 December 1943)

== Bibliography ==
- Busch, Rainer; Röll, Hans-Joachim (1999). German U-boat commanders of World War II : a biographical dictionary. Translated by Brooks, Geoffrey. London, Annapolis, Md: Greenhill Books, Naval Institute Press. ISBN 1-55750-186-6.
- Busch, Rainer; Röll, Hans-Joachim (1999). Deutsche U-Boot-Verluste von September 1939 bis Mai 1945 [German U-boat losses from September 1939 to May 1945]. Der U-Boot-Krieg (in German). Vol. IV. Hamburg, Berlin, Bonn: Mittler. ISBN 3-8132-0514-2.
- Gröner, Erich; Jung, Dieter; Maass, Martin (1991). U-boats and Mine Warfare Vessels. German Warships 1815–1945. Vol. 2. Translated by Thomas, Keith; Magowan, Rachel. London: Conway Maritime Press. ISBN 0-85177-593-4.
- Kemp, Paul (1997). U-Boats Destroyed - German Submarine Losses in the World Wars. Arms & Armour. ISBN 1-85409-515-3.
