= VPB-149 =

Patrol Bombing Squadron 149
- Active: 16 September 1943 – 6 September 1945
- Country: United States of America
- Branch: United States Navy
- Type: squadron
- Role: Maritime patrol
- Engagements: World War II

Aircraft flown
- Patrol: PV-1

VPB-149 was a Patrol Bombing Squadron of the U.S. Navy. The squadron was established as Bombing Squadron 149 (VB-149) on 16 September 1943, redesignated Patrol Bombing Squadron Squadron 149 (VPB-149) on 1 October 1944 and disestablished on 6 September 1945.

== Operational history ==
- 16 September – December 1943: VB-149 was established at NAS Beaufort, South Carolina, under the operational control of FAW-5, as a medium bombing squadron flying the PV-1 Ventura. Twelve aircraft were assigned as the squadron complement with three spares. The squadron remained at NAS Beaufort through the end of September getting organized and collecting supplies, equipment, personnel and aircraft. On 6 October, the flight crews flew to NAAF Boca Chica, Florida, for advanced Anti-submarine warfare (ASW) and shakedown training. The squadron was relocated to MCAS Cherry Point, North Carolina, on 21 November, for operations with the Eastern Sea Frontier in antisubmarine warfare. Concurrent with this reassignment was the transfer of administrative control over the squadron from FAW-5 to FAW-9. On 17 December 1943, the squadron returned to NAS Beaufort, having logged over 2,800 hours of flight time without having sighted an enemy submarine.
- 4 August 1944: VB-149 received orders transferring its operations to NAAF Otis Field, Massachusetts, for training in ground school, rocket, fighter affiliation flights, formation flying, torpedo runs, bombing, strafing and use of LORAN and radar gear.
- 1 October 1944: VPB-149 was transferred to NAS Quonset Point, Rhode Island, where the aircraft underwent necessary overhaul and all hands were given 10 days leave prior to assignment in the South Pacific theater of operations.
- 1 November – 5 December 1944: The squadron departed NAS Quonset Point for NAS Alameda, California, with the last aircraft arriving on the 8th. The crews and ground staff began packing for the trip to NAS Kaneohe Bay, Hawaii. On 29 November the entire squadron with its aircraft boarded USS Wake Island bound for Hawaii. Upon arrival on 5 December the squadron came under the operational control of FAW-2 and commenced combat training at NAS Kaneohe Bay.
- 14–31 December 1944: Six aircraft and nine crews were detached for duty and training at Midway Island. While the detachment was away, the remainder of the squadron continued its advanced training in all aspects of bombing, gunnery, jungle survival and navigation.
- 28 February 1945: VPB-149 was transferred to Manus Island for duty with the Seventh Fleet.
- 1–27 March 1945: VPB-149 was relocated to Tacloban Airfield, Leyte, Philippines, as relief for VPB-137. Upon arrival on 10 March the squadron was placed under the operational control of FAW-10. Combat patrols extended to North Borneo, Palawan and eastern Luzon. From 20 to 27 March the squadron conducted daily strikes with 100-pound bombs, rockets and strafing against Japanese troop concentrations in the Negros area.
- 12 March 1945: Lieutenant E. A. Brigham and his crew became lost on patrol and ditched at sea off the west coast of Cebu. They were rescued by Philippine guerrillas and returned to base two days later by a Dumbo (air-sea rescue) PBY-5A. A second PV-1 flown by Lieutenant J. J. Boyd, lost in the same bad weather, went down at sea and all hands were lost.
- 22 March 1945: Lieutenant Commander Charles M. Wood Jr. and crew failed to return after an attack on Pontevedra, Negros, Philippines.
- 29 March 1945: The squadron was transferred to NAB Samar, Philippines. Daily dawn-to-dusk antishipping patrols were conducted in the southern Visayas Islands area through mid-August. Aircraft maintenance and availability was a problem during this period because the CASU had little experience with PV-1 Venturas. The squadron's own ground staff and aircrew personnel did most of the work.
- 14 August 1945: VPB-149 was relieved for return to Naval Base Pearl Harbor, Hawaii. Upon arrival, squadron personnel began preparations to depart for the U.S. aboard USS Nassau. The ship departed on 21 August and arrived on the 27th.
- 6 September 1945: VPB-149 was disestablished at NAS Alameda.

== Aircraft assignments ==
The squadron was assigned the following aircraft, effective on the dates shown:

- PV-1 - September 1943

== Home port assignments ==
The squadron was assigned to these home ports, effective on the dates shown:

- NAS Beaufort, South Carolina - 16 September 1943
- NAAF Boca Chica, Florida - 6 October 1943
- MCAS Cherry Point, North Carolina - 21 November 1943
- NAS Beaufort - 17 December 1943
- NAAF Otis Field, Massachusetts - 3 August 1944
- NAS Quonset Point, Rhode Island - 1 October 1944
- NAS Alameda, California - 1 November 1944
- NAS Kaneohe Bay, Hawaii - 5 December 1944
- NAS Alameda - 27 August 1945

== See also ==
- Maritime patrol aircraft
- List of inactive United States Navy aircraft squadrons
- List of United States Navy aircraft squadrons
- List of squadrons in the Dictionary of American Naval Aviation Squadrons
- History of the United States Navy
