= Bradley A. Fiske =

United States Navy admiral (1854–1942)

Bradley Allen Fiske
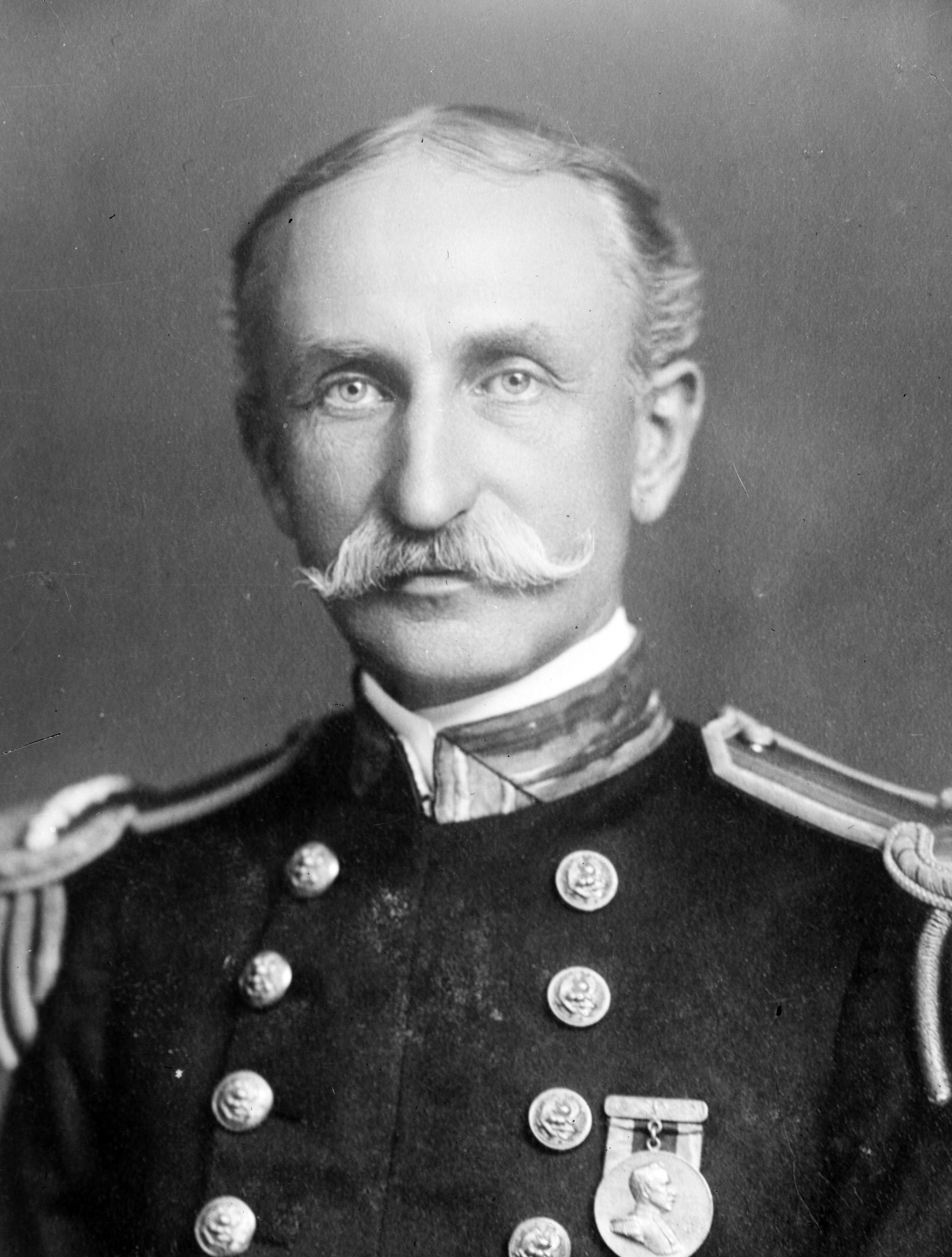
- Born: June 13, 1854; Lyons, New York, US
- Died: April 6, 1942 (aged 87); New York City, US
- Burial place: Arlington National Cemetery
- Military career
- Branch: United States Navy
- Service years: 1874–1916
- Rank: Rear admiral
- Commands: USS Arkansas; USS Minneapolis; USS Tennessee
- Conflicts: Spanish–American War

Rear Admiral Bradley Allen Fiske (June 13, 1854 – April 6, 1942) was an officer in the United States Navy who was noted as a technical innovator. During his long career, Fiske invented more than a hundred and thirty electrical and mechanical devices, with both naval and civilian uses, and wrote extensively on technical and professional issues; The New Yorker called him "one of the notable naval inventors of all time." One of the earliest to understand the revolutionary possibilities of naval aviation, he wrote a number of books of important effect in gaining a wider understanding of the modern Navy by the public. For inventing the rangefinder, he was awarded the Elliott Cresson Medal of The Franklin Institute in 1891.

== Early life and career ==
Fiske was born in Lyons, New York on 13 June 1854 to Rev. William Allen Fiske and Susan Mathews (Bradley) Fiske. He was appointed to the United States Naval Academy from the State of Ohio in 1870, graduating four years later and receiving his commission as an ensign in July 1875.

His early service years included duty as an officer on board the steam sloops-of-war Pensacola and Plymouth, both on the Pacific Station, and the paddle steamer Powhatan in the Atlantic. He also received instruction in the then-young field of torpedo warfare.

Promoted to master in 1881 and lieutenant in 1887, during much of that decade he had training ship duty in Saratoga and Minnesota, served in the South Atlantic Squadron on the steam sloop Brooklyn, and was twice assigned to the Bureau of Ordnance in Washington, D.C.

He married Josephine Harper on February 15, 1882 in New York and they had one daughter, Caroline Harper Fiske, in 1885. Josephine was the sister of publisher Henry S. Harper.

As one of the Navy's most technically astute officers, in 1886-1888 he supervised the installation of ordnance on Atlanta, one of the first of the Navy's modern steel warships. In 1888-1890 he was involved in the trials of the Vesuvius, whose large caliber compressed-air guns were then considered a promising experiment, and was in charge of installing electric lighting in the new cruiser Philadelphia.

== Spanish–American War and afterward ==
During the rest of the 1890s, Lieutenant Fiske was mainly employed at the Bureau of Ordnance and at sea, where he was an officer of the cruiser San Francisco, and the gunboats Yorktown and Petrel. While serving in the latter, he took part in the Battle of Manila Bay on 1 May 1898.

Following the Spanish–American War, Fiske continued his service in Philippine waters on board the monitor Monadnock.

== Command assignments ==
During the years between the Spanish–American War and World War I, Fiske advanced rapidly in rank: to lieutenant commander in 1899, commander in 1903, and captain in 1907. He held many responsible positions on shore and at sea, serving as an inspector of ordnance, executive officer of Yorktown and the battleship Massachusetts, commanding officer of the monitor Arkansas and cruisers Minneapolis and Tennessee, had recruiting duty, served as captain of the yard at the Philadelphia Navy Yard, attended the Naval War College and was a member of the Navy's General Board (1911) and the Army-Navy Joint Board, among other assignments.

== Flag assignments ==
Bradley Fiske became a rear admiral in August 1911, subsequently commanding three different divisions of the Atlantic Fleet as well as serving as the Secretary of the Navy's Aide for Inspections. In February 1913 he was appointed Aide for Operations, a post that later became that of Chief of Naval Operations. As Aide for Operations, Fiske forcefully advocated the creation of a Naval general staff and the elevation of the nation's preparedness for war.

On November 9, 1914, Fiske sent a memorandum to then Secretary of the Navy Josephus Daniels that the U.S. Navy was not organized for warfare: "If this country avoids war during the next five years it will be accomplished only by a happy combination of high diplomatic skill and rare good fortune," the memo said, stating the Navy was short 19,600 men from its stated table of organization. Though individual ships were well-maintained and controlled, naval administration was lacking.

Fiske resigned as Aide for Operations on April 1, 1915, and was replaced by Admiral William Shepherd Benson as the first Chief of Naval Operations.

== Naval innovations ==
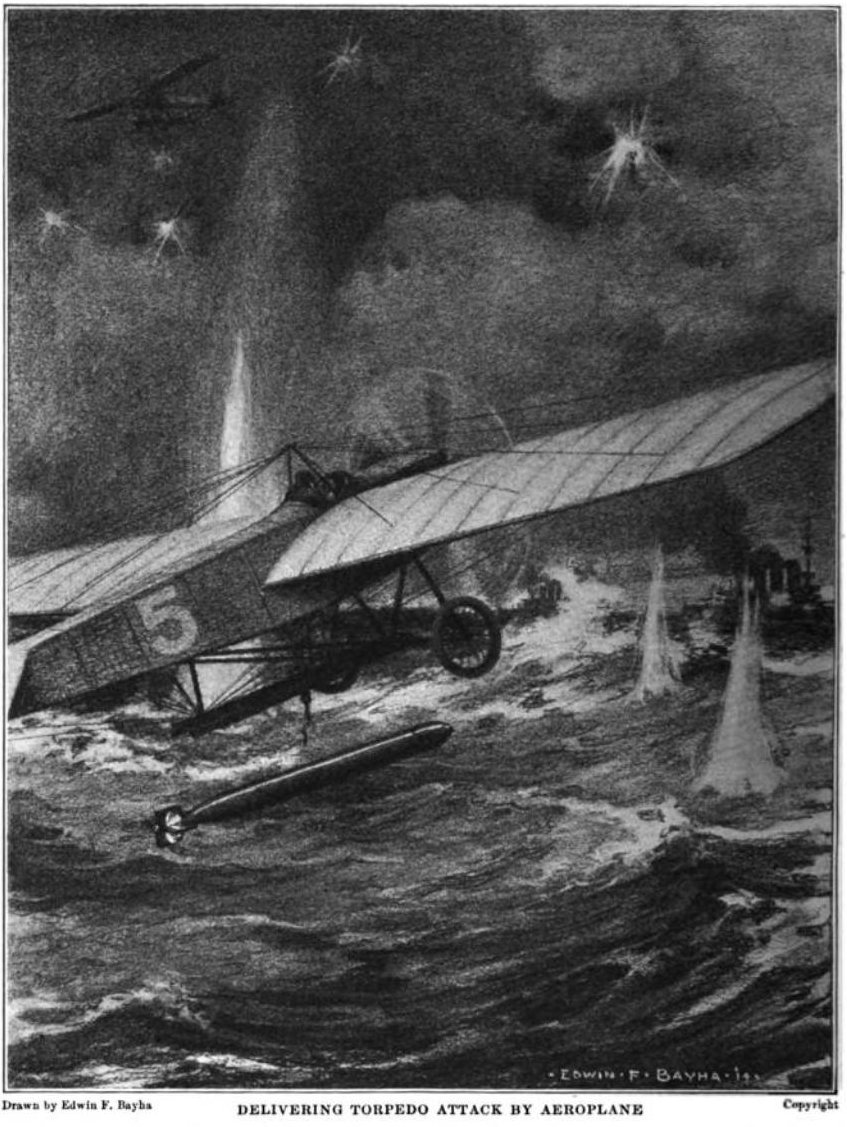
In 1915, Fiske reported that aerial torpedoes could be used to attack enemy fleets in their own harbors.

In the late 19th century, ships' guns were equipped only with open sights. Fiske, then a lieutenant on a gunboat, developed the idea of augmenting his ship's guns with a telescopic sight to improve accuracy. By 1890, he had taken out the first of several patents on his telescopic sights, which in time would be developed into the modern range finder.

In 1910, while considering the problem of defending the Philippine islands, Fiske conceived of the idea of equipping aircraft with lightweight torpedoes. Fiske worked out the mechanics of carrying and releasing an aerial torpedo from a bomber, and defined tactics that included a night-time approach so that the target ship would be less able to defend itself. Airplanes large enough to suit his purpose were not available until 1912, at which point Fiske was able to implement his design. Fiske reported in 1915 that, using this method, enemy fleets could be attacked within their own harbors, and remarked that he had invented not just a new weapon but an entirely new method of warfare.

== Retirement and later years ==
Following a year at the Naval War College, Rear Admiral Fiske was retired upon reaching the age of 62 in June 1916. His professional activities continued into the mid-1920s, however, with service as president of the U.S. Naval Institute and several sessions of temporary duty with the Navy Department.

In 1924, Rear Admiral Bradley A. Fiske was quoted in the New York Times stating that "the Japanese and the Americans have taken attitudes that are irreconcilable [regarding the Immigration Act] and such attitudes have usually preceded wars... We are prepared for war if it does come."

Among Fiske's improvements were an improved stadimeter, helm-angle indicator, engine-room telegraphs, speed and direction indicators, a turret range finder, a gun director system, and steering telegraphs.

On March 5, 1922, an article appeared in the New York Times stating that "Rear Admiral Bradley A. Fiske, has turned his inventive genius to the literary field and has produced an instrument designed to revolutionize the reading of books." The article goes on to describe the Fiske Reading Machine as:

. . . a tiny affair. It consists of a light frame of aluminum, which carries a strip of paper containing reading matters whose characters have been reduced by photo-engraving to a size about one-hundredth of the size of ordinary typewritten characters. A lens surmounts the frame, and through this the characters are magnified so as to be easily read. A roller attached to the frame is moved by the forefinger to bring the reading matter steadily in line with the eye.

Though Fiske's intention was to allow a reader to carry a small library of books in a purse or pocket, his invention never caught on. Even so, twenty-first century observers have noted similarities between the Fiske Reading Machine and devices such as the Amazon Kindle.

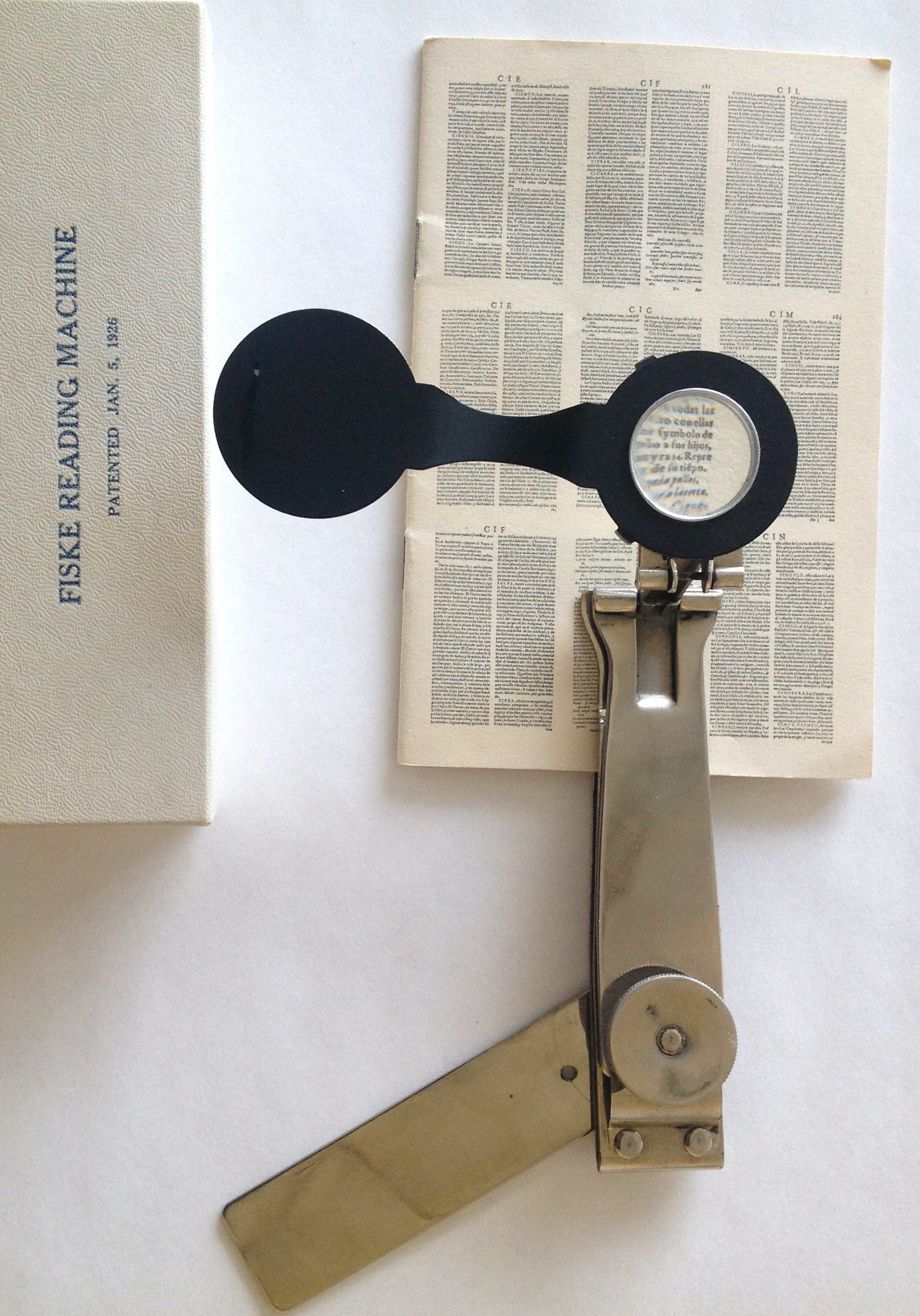
Fiske Reading Machine with miniaturized text of Don Quixote by Miguel de Cervantes.

Rear Admiral Bradley A. Fiske died in New York City on 6 April 1942, aged 87. He was interred at Arlington National Cemetery four days later.

== Namesake ==
The Navy has named two warships, Fiske (DE-143), 1943–1944, and Fiske (DD-842), 1945–1980, in his honor.

== Bibliography ==
=== Books ===
- Electricity in Theory and Practice (1883) [written while Fiske was a lieutenant]
- American Naval Policy (1905) [written while Fiske was a commander]
- War Time in Manila (1913)
- Preparedness of the Navy (1916)
- The Navy as a Fighting Machine (1916)
- From Midshipman To Rear-Admiral (1919) [Autobiography]
- The Art of Fighting (1920)
- Invention, the Master-Key to Progress (1921)

=== Articles, essays, and introductions ===
- "The Naval Profession," United States Naval Institute Proceedings, June 1907, pp. 570–73
- Introduction to Textbook of Aeronautics, by Henry Woodhose (1917).
- "France", in For France, by Charles Hanson Towne (1918)
- Introduction to Togo and the Rise of Japanese Sea Power by Edwin A. Falk (1936)
- "Electricity in Naval Life. The Steering Telegraph," The Electrical Engineer, 21 October 1896: 399-401.

== Gallery ==
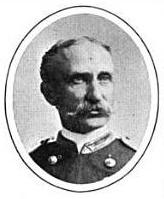

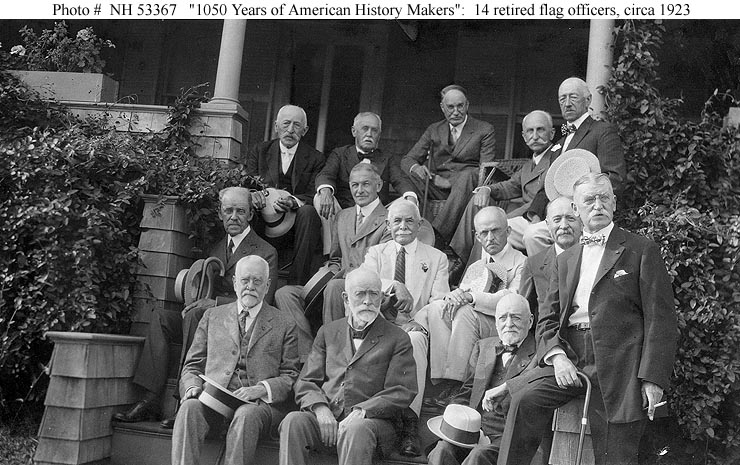
Fiske is second from the right in the back row in this photograph of 13 retired U.S. Navy and U.S. Marine Corps flag officers taken ca. 1923.

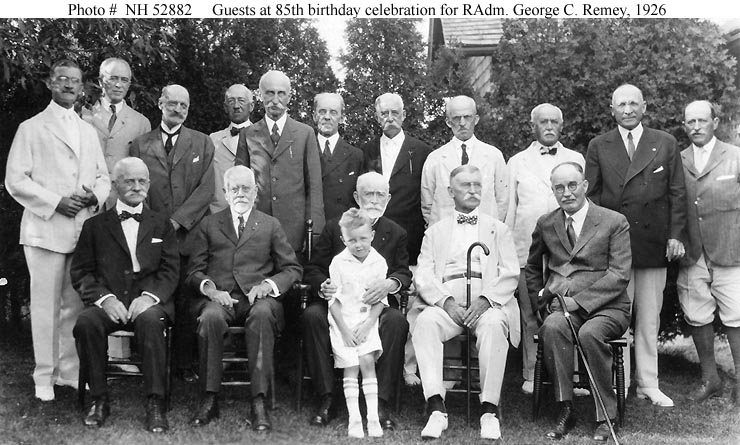
Fiske is standing fifth from left in this photo of retired flag officers taken at the 85th birthday party of Rear Admiral George C. Remey on 10 August 1926.

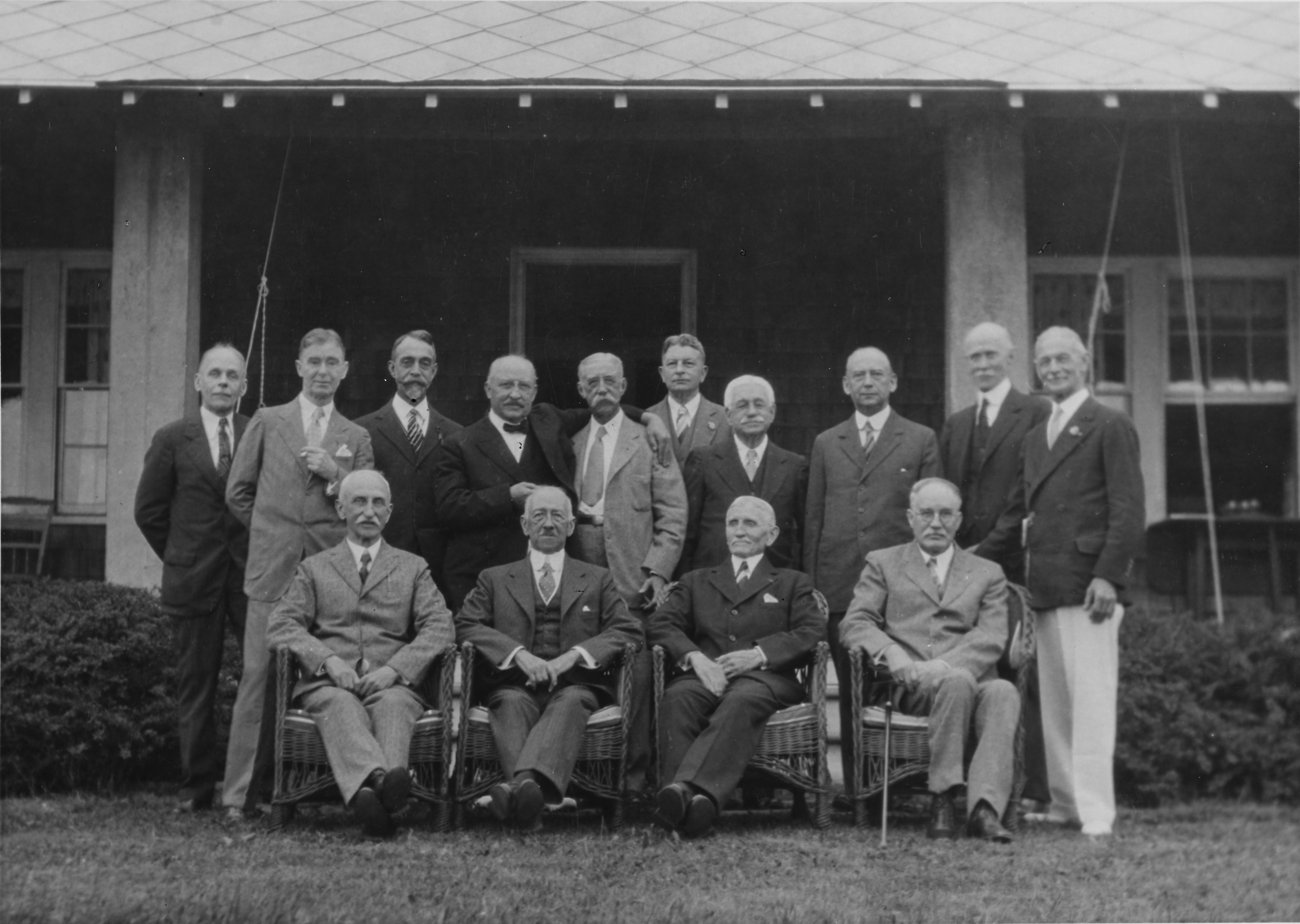
Fiske is seated on the left in this 7 August 1928 photograph of retired U.S. Navy rear admirals and other retirees at Rear Admiral Spencer S. Wood's home in Jamestown, Rhode Island.

== See also ==
- Percy Scott (contemporary innovator for the Royal Navy)
