= German submarine U-1000 =

German World War II submarine

History

Nazi Germany
- Name: U-1000
- Ordered: 14 October 1941
- Builder: Blohm & Voss, Hamburg
- Yard number: 200
- Laid down: 18 December 1942
- Launched: 17 September 1943
- Commissioned: 4 November 1943
- Decommissioned: 29 September 1944
- Fate: Broken up in 1945

General characteristics
- Class & type: Type VIIC/41 submarine
- Displacement: 759 tonnes (747 long tons) surfaced; 860 t (846 long tons) submerged
- Length: 67.10 m (220 ft 2 in) o/a; 50.50 m (165 ft 8 in) pressure hull
- Beam: 6.20 m (20 ft 4 in) o/a; 4.70 m (15 ft 5 in) pressure hull
- Height: 9.60 m (31 ft 6 in)
- Draught: 4.74 m (15 ft 7 in)
- Installed power: 2,800–3,200 PS (2,100–2,400 kW; 2,800–3,200 bhp) (diesels); 750 PS (550 kW; 740 shp) (electric)
- Propulsion: 2 shafts; 2 × diesel engines; 2 × electric motors
- Speed: 17.7 knots (32.8 km/h; 20.4 mph) surfaced; 7.6 knots (14.1 km/h; 8.7 mph) submerged
- Range: 8,500 nmi (15,700 km; 9,800 mi) at 10 knots (19 km/h; 12 mph) surfaced; 80 nmi (150 km; 92 mi) at 4 knots (7.4 km/h; 4.6 mph) submerged
- Test depth: 230 m (750 ft); Calculated crush depth: 250–295 m (820–968 ft)
- Complement: 44-52 officers & ratings
- Armament: 5 × 53.3 cm (21 in) torpedo tubes (4 bow, 1 stern); 14 × torpedoes; 1 × 8.8 cm (3.46 in) deck gun (220 rounds); 1 × 3.7 cm (1.5 in) Flak M42 AA gun; 2 × 2 cm (0.79 in) C/30 AA guns

Service record
- Part of: 31st U-boat Flotilla; 4 November 1943 – 31 July 1944; 8th U-boat Flotilla; 1 August – 29 September 1944
- Identification codes: M 52 805
- Commanders: Oblt.z.S. Willi Müller; 4 November 1943 – 29 September 1944
- Operations: 1 patrol: a. 4 – 19 June 1944; b. 25 June 1944; c. 27 – 29 July 1944; d. 12 – 13 August 1944; e. 15 – 17 August 1944; f. 26 August 1944; g. 29 August 1944; h. 31 August 1944
- Victories: None

German submarine U-1000 was a Type VIIC/41 U-boat built during World War II for service in Nazi Germany's Kriegsmarine.

== Design ==
German Type VIIC/41 submarines were preceded by the heavier Type VIIC submarines. U-1000 had a displacement of 759 tonnes (747 long tons) when at the surface and 860 tonnes (850 long tons) while submerged. She had a total length of 67.10 m (220 ft 2 in), a pressure hull length of 50.50 m (165 ft 8 in), a beam of 6.20 m (20 ft 4 in), a height of 9.60 m (31 ft 6 in), and a draught of 4.74 m (15 ft 7 in). The submarine was powered by two Germaniawerft F46 four-stroke, six-cylinder supercharged diesel engines producing a total of 2,800 to 3,200 metric horsepower (2,060 to 2,350 kW; 2,760 to 3,160 shp) for use while surfaced, two Brown, Boveri & Cie GG UB 720/8 double-acting electric motors producing a total of 750 metric horsepower (550 kW; 740 shp) for use while submerged. She had two shafts and two 1.23 m (4 ft) propellers. The boat was capable of operating at depths of up to 230 metres (750 ft).

The submarine had a maximum surface speed of 17.7 knots (32.8 km/h; 20.4 mph) and a maximum submerged speed of 7.6 knots (14.1 km/h; 8.7 mph). When submerged, the boat could operate for 80 nautical miles (150 km; 92 mi) at 4 knots (7.4 km/h; 4.6 mph); when surfaced, she could travel 8,500 nautical miles (15,700 km; 9,800 mi) at 10 knots (19 km/h; 12 mph). U-1000 was fitted with five 53.3 cm (21 in) torpedo tubes (four fitted at the bow and one at the stern), fourteen torpedoes, one 8.8 cm (3.46 in) SK C/35 naval gun, (220 rounds), one 3.7 cm (1.5 in) Flak M42 and two 2 cm (0.79 in) C/30 anti-aircraft guns. The boat had a complement of between forty-four and sixty.

== Service history ==
She was completed in Hamburg in November 1943, and after working up trials was moved to Egersund in Norway in June 1944. From there she conducted her only war patrol in the waters off Norway, in the North Sea and towards the Arctic Circle, but found no enemy ships to target, returning to Bergen without firing a shot. She did however manage to recover two Norwegian airmen of the British Royal Air Force, whose Mosquito aircraft had been shot down by U-804 two days before they were rescued from the sea.

On the 9 August, U-1000 was detailed to serve in the Baltic Sea against Soviet shipping, which was beginning to press into German waters as the Red Army advanced on land.

== Fate ==
On the 31 August 1944, as she passed the East Prussian town of Pillau on her way to Reval, she struck a sea mine laid by the Royal Air Force. The mine crippled the submarine, which limped into Pillau in a wrecked state. All the crew survived the blast, but the boat was totally unserviceable and was abandoned in Pillau, the crew being transferred to U-3523, on board which they were all killed the following year. RAF aircraft frequently mined German coastal waters, as they knew the routes used by German shipping, and could thus severely restrict German movement by sea with the use of air-dropped minefields.

== See also ==
- Battle of the Atlantic (1939-1945)

== Bibliography ==
- Busch, Rainer; Röll, Hans-Joachim (1999). German U-boat commanders of World War II : a biographical dictionary. Translated by Brooks, Geoffrey. London, Annapolis, Md: Greenhill Books, Naval Institute Press. ISBN 1-55750-186-6.
- Busch, Rainer; Röll, Hans-Joachim (1999). Deutsche U-Boot-Verluste von September 1939 bis Mai 1945 [German U-boat losses from September 1939 to May 1945]. Der U-Boot-Krieg (in German). Vol. IV. Hamburg, Berlin, Bonn: Mittler. ISBN 3-8132-0514-2.
- Gröner, Erich; Jung, Dieter; Maass, Martin (1991). German Warships 1815–1945, U-boats and Mine Warfare Vessels. Vol. 2. Translated by Thomas, Keith; Magowan, Rachel. London: Conway Maritime Press. ISBN 0-85177-593-4.
- Sharpe, Peter (1998). U-Boat Fact File. Great Britain: Midland Publishing. ISBN 1-85780-072-9.
