= USS Wake Island =

Casablanca-class escort carrier of the US Navy

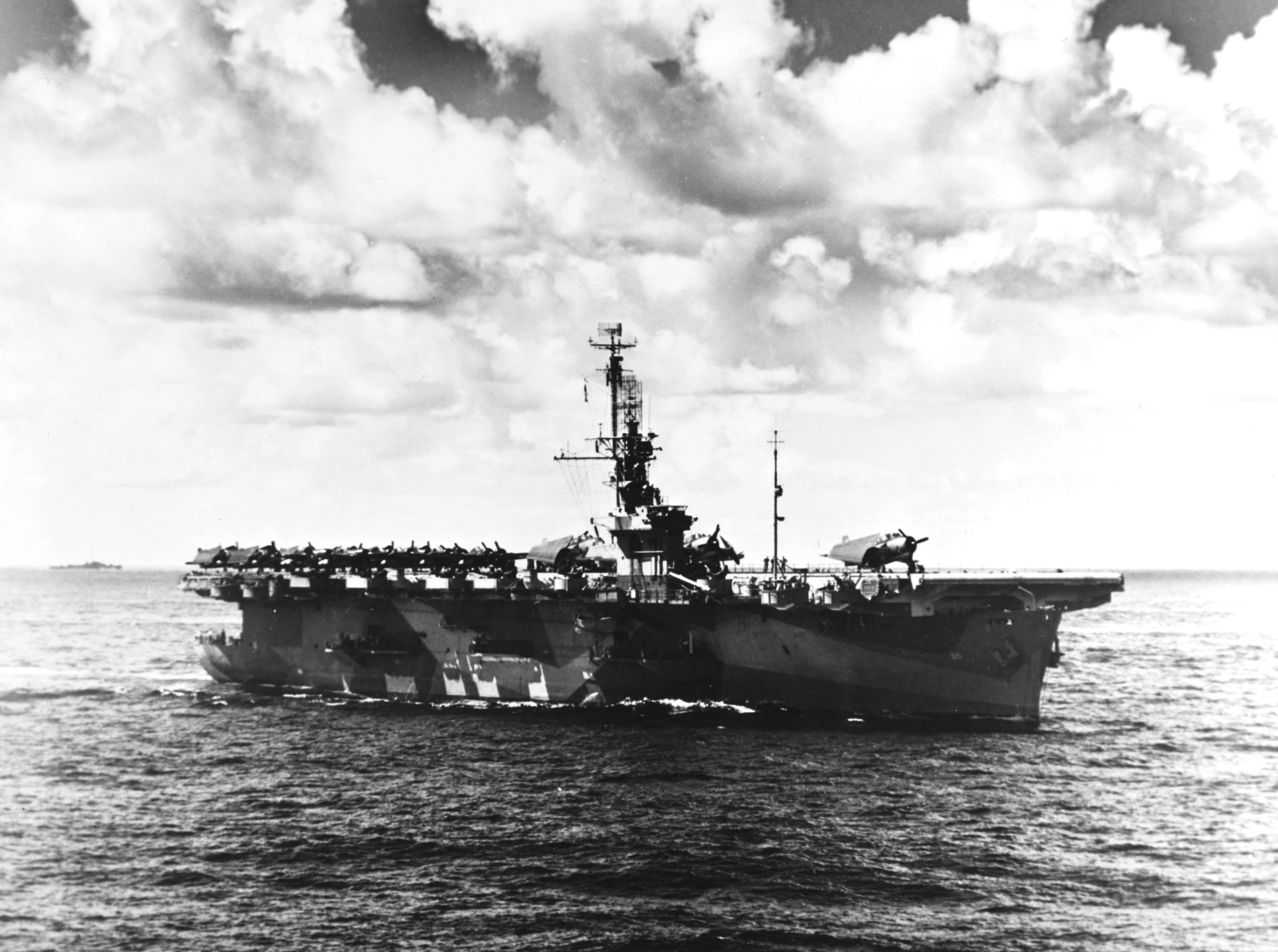

History

United States
- Name: USS Wake Island
- Namesake: Battle of Wake Island
- Builder: Kaiser Shipyards
- Laid down: 6 February 1943
- Launched: 15 September 1943
- Commissioned: 7 November 1943
- Decommissioned: 5 April 1946
- Stricken: 17 April 1946
- Fate: Sold for scrap on 19 April 1946

General characteristics
- Class & type: Casablanca-class escort carrier
- Displacement: 7,800 tons
- Length: 512 ft 3 in (156.13 m) overall
- Beam: 65 ft (20 m), 108 ft (33 m) maximum width
- Draft: 22 ft 4 in (6.81 m)
- Propulsion: 2 × 5-cylinder reciprocating Skinner Unaflow engines; 4 × 285 psi boilers; 2 shafts; 9,000 shp
- Speed: 19 knots (35 km/h)
- Range: 10,240 nmi (18,960 km) @ 15 kn (28 km/h)
- Complement: Total:910–916 officers and men; Embarked Squadron:50-56; Ship's Crew:860
- Armament: 1 × 5 in (127 mm)/38 cal dual-purpose gun, 16 × Bofors 40 mm gun guns (8×2), 28 × Oerlikon 20 mm cannons (28×1)
- Aircraft carried: 28

Service record
- Part of: United States Atlantic Fleet, United States Pacific Fleet
- Operations: Philippines campaign, Invasion of Iwo Jima, Battle of Okinawa
- Victories: German submarine U-543
- Awards: 3 Battle stars

USS Wake Island (CVE-65) was a Casablanca-class escort carrier of the United States Navy.

She was laid down under a United States Maritime Commission contract (MC hull 1102) on 6 February 1943 at Vancouver, Washington, by the Kaiser Shipyards; launched on 15 September 1943, sponsored by Mrs. Frederick Carl Sherman, the wife of Rear Admiral Frederick Sherman; and commissioned on 7 November 1943, with Captain Hames R. Tague in command.

== Design and description ==
A side profile of the design of Thetis Bay.

Wake Island was a Casablanca-class escort carrier, the most numerous type of aircraft carriers ever built. Built to stem heavy losses during the Battle of the Atlantic, they came into service in late 1943, by which time the U-boat threat was already in retreat. Although some did see service in the Atlantic, the majority were utilized in the Pacific, ferrying aircraft, providing logistics support, and conducting close air support for the island-hopping campaigns. The Casablanca-class carriers were built on the standardized Type S4-S2-BB3 hull, a lengthened variant of the Doyen-class hull, and specifically designed to be mass-produced using welded prefabricated sections. This allowed them to be produced at unprecedented speeds: the final ship of her class, Munda, was delivered to the Navy just 101 days after the laying of her keel.

Wake Island was 512 ft 3 in (156.13 m) long overall (490 ft (150 m) at the waterline), had a beam of 65 ft 2 in (19.86 m), and a draft of 20 ft 9 in (6.32 m). She displaced 8,188 long tons (8,319 t) standard, which increased to 10,902 long tons (11,077 t) with a full load. To carry out flight operations, the ship had a 257 ft (78 m) hangar deck and a 474 ft (144 m) flight deck. Her compact size necessitated the installation of an aircraft catapult at her bow, and there were two aircraft elevators to facilitate movement of aircraft between the flight and hangar deck: one each fore and aft.

She was powered by four Babcock & Wilcox Express D boilers that raised 285 psi (1,970 kPa) of steam at 577 °F (303 °C). The steam generated by these boilers fed two Skinner Unaflow reciprocating steam engines, delivering 9,000 hp (6,700 kW) to two propeller shafts. This allowed her to reach speeds of 19 kn (35 km/h; 22 mph), with a cruising range of 10,240 nmi (18,960 km; 11,780 mi) at 15 kn (28 km/h; 17 mph). For armament, one 5 in (127 mm)/38 caliber dual-purpose gun was mounted on the stern. Additional anti-aircraft defense was provided by eight Bofors 40 mm (1.57 in) anti-aircraft guns in single mounts and twelve Oerlikon 20 mm (0.79 in) cannons mounted around the perimeter of the deck. By 1945, Casablanca-class carriers had been modified to carry twenty Oerlikon cannons and sixteen Bofors guns; the doubling of the latter was accomplished by putting them into twin mounts. Sensors onboard consisted of a SG surface-search radar and a SK air-search radar.

Although Casablanca-class escort carriers were intended to function with a crew of 860 and an embarked squadron of 50 to 56, the exigencies of wartime often necessitated the inflation of the crew count. They were designed to operate with 27 aircraft, but the hangar deck could accommodate much more during transport or training missions.

== Service history ==
=== World War II ===
==== Atlantic ====
Following commissioning, Wake Island received supplies, ammunition, and gasoline at Astoria, Oregon, and got underway on 27 November 1943 for Puget Sound and anchored the following day at Bremerton, Washington, where she continued to load supplies and ammunition. The carrier operated in the Puget Sound area conducting structural firing tests and making stops at Port Townsend, Sinclair Inlet, and Seattle before sailing south on 6 December. She arrived at San Francisco, California on 10 December, took on fuel, and, two days later, headed for San Diego, arriving there on 14 December for shakedown and availability. Before departing, the carrier took on board the personnel and planes of Composite Squadron 69 (VC-69).

On 11 January 1944, Wake Island got underway and steamed, via the Panama Canal, to Hampton Roads, Virginia, arriving at Norfolk, Virginia on 26 January. Following availability, the carrier sailed on 14 February for New York City in company with Mission Bay, Swenning, and Haverfield.

On 16 February, after loading supplies and embarking Army and Navy officers for transportation, Wake Island set course for Recife, Brazil, the first stop on her voyage to Karachi, India. She arrived at Recife on 1 March and made stops at Cape Town, South Africa, and Diego Suarez Harbor, Madagascar, before arriving at Karachi on 29 March. The carrier began her return trip on 3 April and arrived back at Norfolk on 12 May.

She spent the remainder of May and part of June undergoing alterations and an overhaul. She then took on board the planes and personnel of VC-58 and, on 15 June, set course toward Bermuda for duty as the nucleus of Task Group 22.6 (TG 22.6), a combined, air-and-surface, anti-submarine, hunter-killer group. The highlight of her cruise came on 2 July, when one of her Grumman TBM Avengers intercepted the German submarine U-543 off the coast of Africa between the Canary and Cape Verde Islands, making its way home after an unsuccessful patrol in the Gulf of Guinea. The pilot, Ensign Frederick L. Moore, braved heavy anti-aircraft fire from U-543, while making two bombing attacks which sank the U-boat. However, no evidence appeared to confirm the kill, so the carrier and her escorts spent the next two weeks hunting the already-destroyed submarine.

TG 22.6 began her next serious encounter with the enemy two minutes before noon on 2 August, when Douglas L. Howard sighted a U-boat's conning tower some eight miles (13 km) away. She and Fiske were detached to investigate, while all planes in the area were recalled. An Avenger, armed with depth bombs, was catapulted at 1209. At 1235, a torpedo, apparently fired by a second submarine, hit Fiske midships and broke her in two. The ships of the group managed to maneuver clear of two more torpedoes which were fired at the force. The first report of casualties listed 4 dead, 26 missing, and 55 seriously injured. Farquhar was detached to support Howard and later to pick up survivors. As the group was preparing to avenge the loss of Fiske, heavy fog and rain stopped all operations.

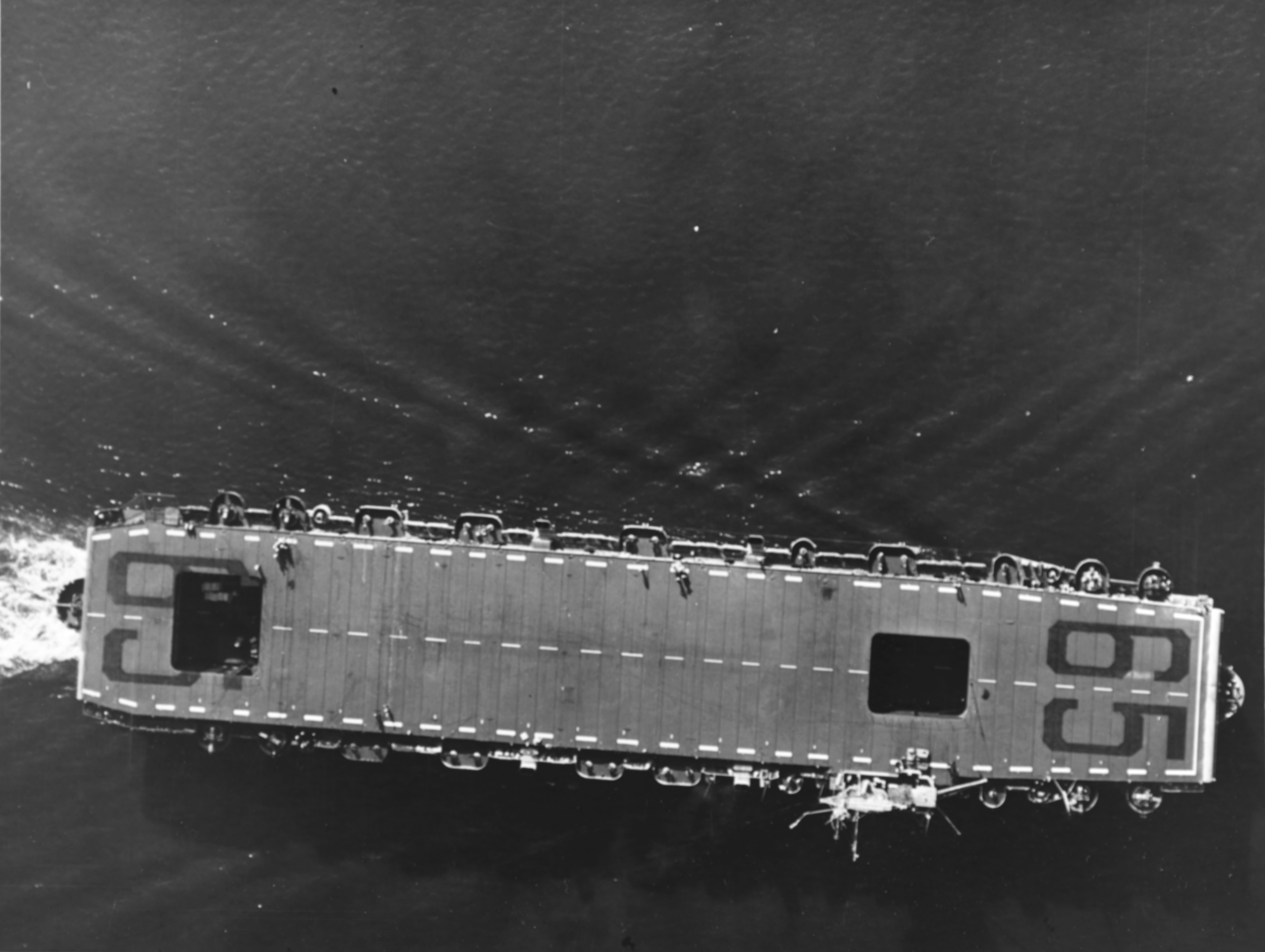
Wake Island underway in Hampton Roads, 9 November 1944

On 4 August, TG 22.6 was dissolved, and four days later, Wake Island made rendezvous with Convoy UC-32 as it steamed westward. She left the convoy on the 11th and headed for Hampton Roads. She arrived at Norfolk on the 15th for alterations and repairs which lasted through the 25th. Following post-repair trials and a brief availability, the escort carrier sailed on 29 August for Quonset Point, Rhode Island, to relieve Mission Bay on carrier aircraft qualification operation duty which lasted until 30 October. The next day, the carrier sailed for Norfolk with Lea and Babbitt as escorts, and arrived on 1 November for a period of availability.

==== Pacific ====
===== Philippines =====
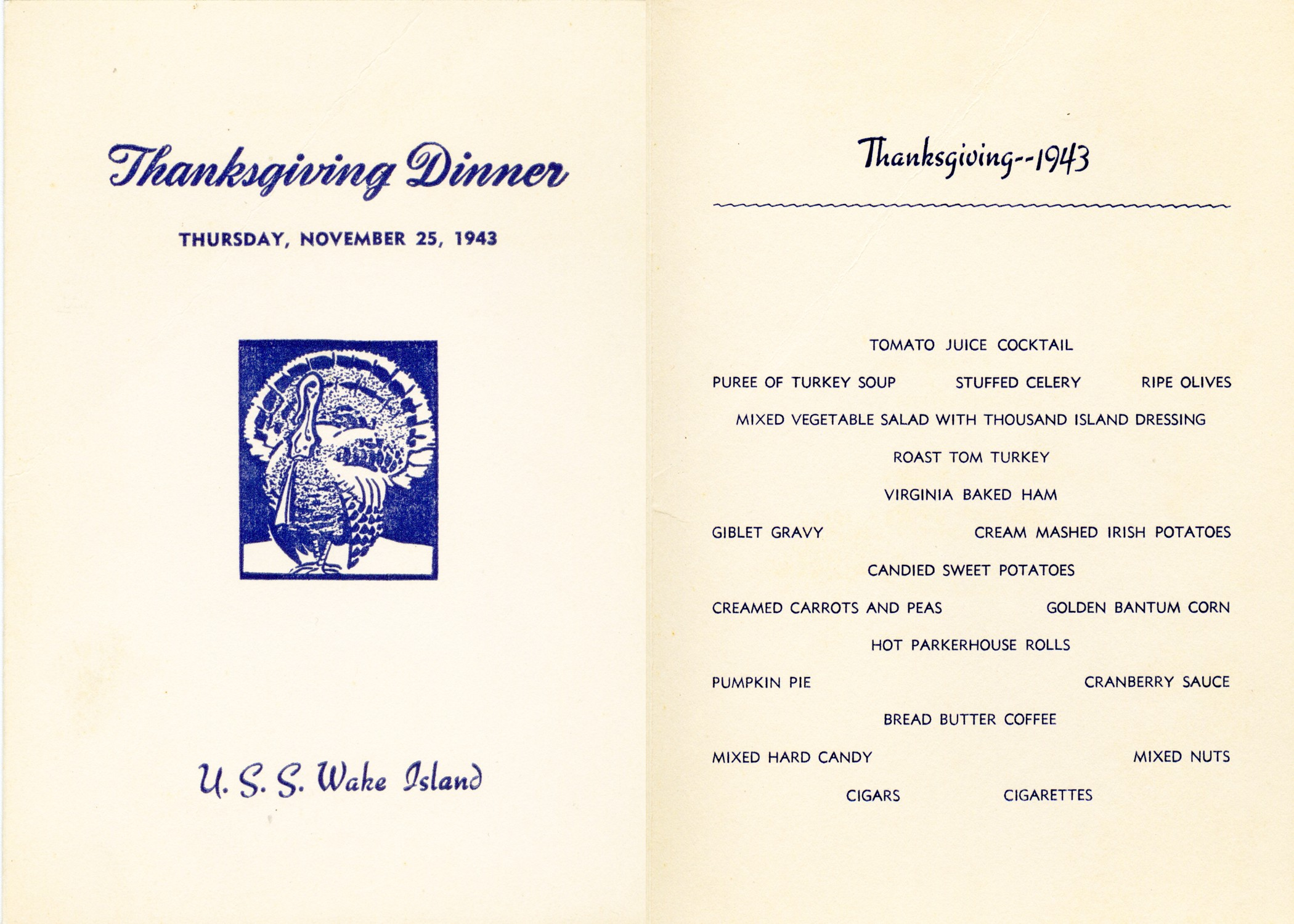
1943 Thanksgiving Day dinner menu from USS Wake Island (CVE-65)

On the 11th, she stood out of Norfolk in company with Shamrock Bay and escorts bound via the Panama Canal for the west coast. The carrier entered San Francisco Bay on 28 November, and moored at the Naval Air Station Alameda, California, where she embarked two new aircraft squadrons before heading for Hawaii the following day. She moored at Ford Island, Pearl Harbor on 5 December, detached squadrons VC-9 and VPB-149, and disembarked personnel, planes, and equipment. Ten days later, Wake Island, her flight deck laden with cargo and unable to launch or receive planes, got underway for the Admiralty Islands with escorts Richard M. Rowell and O'Flaherty. She arrived at Manus Island on 27 December, discharged all cargo and passengers, sailed for the Palau Islands, and arrived at Kossol Roads on New Year's Day 1945. Late that evening, she loaded ammunition from a barge and got underway at 0642, bound for the Philippines and the forthcoming invasion of Luzon, in company with a tremendous fleet which had gathered for the operation.

Two days later, Wake Island passed through Surigao Strait and launched both SNAP (anti-snooper air patrol) and LCAP (local combat air patrol) aircraft. On 4 January 1945, she was operating in the Sulu Sea and launched a three-hour SNAP. The American planes sighted a single-engine Japanese float plane on the water off the southeastern tip of Panay Island. It appeared to be in the hands of a salvage crew. Two of the scout planes made two strafing runs each and left the plane riddled and the salvage crew dispersed.

The Fleet entered Panay Gulf about 100 miles (160 km) southeast of Manila. Wake Island's surface search radar was jammed by enemy transmission, and the escort carrier went to general quarters at 1714. One minute later, a Japanese single-engine plane appeared overhead in a steep diving attack on Ommaney Bay, some 4,200 yards (3,800 m) away. Fire immediately flared from that carrier's flight and hangar decks, and after 20 minutes, her crew abandoned Ommaney Bay under a dense cloud of black smoke. She burned with explosions of ammunition and was finally scuttled astern of the fleet by a torpedo from an American destroyer.

On 5 January, Wake Island received 19 survivors of Ommaney Bay who had been rescued by Maury. The ship went to general quarters with bogies on the radar screen, but three threatened raids failed to develop. At 1502, eight LCAP fighters from Wake Island pounced upon a division of Japanese Army fighters. When the melee was over, the Americans claimed three certain kills and a probable without suffering any loss themselves. In all, Wake Island launched three LCAP's during daylight. At 1655, the ship again went to general quarters to repel an air attack and for the next hour was under severe attack. At one time, six single-engine planes were simultaneously diving on carriers off Wake Island's port side. Five were knocked down by anti-aircraft fire, narrowly missing their targets, but one managed a hit on Manila Bay. She caught fire and dropped behind, but her efficient damage control efforts enabled her to resume her position in the formation in only 51 minutes, with her flight deck out of commission. During the attack, at least 10 enemy planes splashed within 5,000 yards (4,600 m) of Wake Island, and her own anti-aircraft gunners claimed three.

On 13 January, two enemy planes attacked Salamaua, cruising about eight miles (13 km) astern of Wake Island. One of the attackers was shot down, but the other scored a hit which briefly slowed that carrier. She soon regained speed and controlled a fire on her hangar deck without losing her position in the formation. Four days later, Wake Island was detached and left Lingayen Gulf in TG 77.14, a force consisting of eight escort carriers and their screen to retire to Ulithi, Caroline Islands. She anchored at Ulithi's southern anchorage from 23 to 31 January, undergoing availability and preparing for further operations. During this period, her home port was changed from Norfolk to Puget Sound, Bremerton, Washington.

===== Iwo Jima =====
On 10 February 1945, the carrier got underway to join TG 52.2, which had been established to provide air cover and support while escorting major units to the Volcano Islands and then to furnish naval gunfire, spotting, and direct air support for landing forces. The following day, she steamed to an area off Saipan-Tinian where rehearsals for the invasion took place. On 13 February, Wake Island's commanding officer, Capt. Austen V. Magly, was designated OTC of Task Unit 52.2.1 (TU 52.2.1).

On 14 February, the carrier set course for Iwo Jima and, two days later, arrived at her operating area 49 miles (79 km) from the southwestern tip of Iwo Jima. Shortly after daylight, the heavy bombardment group began shelling shore installations on the island. Planes from Wake Island flew spotting sorties, attacked defensive works with rocket fire, and flew local antisubmarine patrols and hydrographic observation flights over the beaches. D-day for the invasion of Iwo Jima was 19 February; and on that day, Wake Island operated as before, flying 56 spotting sorties and firing 87 rockets.

Bismarck Sea, a carrier in her group, was sunk by a kamikaze attack on 21 February. The next day, Wake Island was detached and ordered to proceed to a rendezvous point east of Iwo Jima. There, she refueled on 23 February and set course to return to the operating area east of Iwo Jima. The following day, she took station some 35 miles (56 km) from the southern tip of Iwo Jima and flew 55 spotting sorties, expending 205 rockets. In the ensuing weeks, Wake Island continued her operations supporting the Marines. On 5 March, she received a message of special interest from Commander, TU 52.2.1, Rear Admiral Clifton Sprague: "If your ship is as good as your Air Department and Squadron, it is a standout. I have seen nearly all the combat CVEs' work and I must say the Wake tops them all for efficiency, smoothness and good judgement. I hope we are together again."

After 24 consecutive days of operations, Wake Island retired on 8 March from her station off Iwo Jima and rendezvoused with Saginaw Bay west of the island. The next day, they headed for Ulithi and arrived there on 14 March.

===== Okinawa =====
The carrier spent the next five days at anchor, preparing for another operation. She got underway on 21 March to supply air support for forces about to invade Okinawa. On 25 March, she arrived in the operating area roughly 60 miles (97 km) south of Okinawa Jima and began sending flights over Kerama Retto beaches and Okinawa. Wake Island continued her support of the campaign through the initial landings at Okinawa on 1 April.

On the 3rd, the carrier was operating southeast of Okinawa. At 1722, she completed the landing of her fifth spotting sortie, and all her planes were back on board. Eight minutes later, she went to general quarters, and enemy bogies were reported. At 1742, a violent wave hit the ship while planes were being moved for spotting on the flight deck. Two General Motors FM-2 Wildcats were thrown off the flight deck into the water. Two fighters were flipped over on their backs, and two others received severe damage when tossed about.

At the same instant, two Wildcats broke loose from their lashings on the hangar deck and collided, with major damage to both. At 1744, a Japanese single-engine aircraft plunged at the ship from a high angle and missed the port forward corner of the flight deck, exploding in the water abreast the forecastle. Thirty seconds later, a second similar aircraft whistled down on the starboard side at tremendous speed, narrowly missing the bridge structure and plunging into the water about 10 feet (3.0 m) from the hull. The aircraft exploded after impact, ripping a hole in the ship's side below the waterline, about 45 feet (14 m) long and about 18 feet (5.5 m) from top to bottom, and making many shrapnel holes. Parts of the aircraft were thrown onto the forecastle and into the gun sponsons. Various compartments were flooded, and the shell plating cracked between the first and second decks. Other shell plating buckled, and the main condensers were flooded with salt water, contaminating some 30,000 US gallons (110 m³) of fresh water and 70,000 US gallons (260 m³) of fuel oil. At 1824, salting made it necessary to secure the forward engine, and the ship proceeded on one propeller. Remarkably, there were no injuries; and, by 2140, corrective measures had been taken, and the ship was again steaming on both engines. The next day, Wake Island steamed to Kerama Retto anchorage with Dennis and Goss. While she remained there undergoing inspection by the fleet salvage officer, special precautions were taken to guard against possible Japanese suicide swimmers from islands of the cluster not yet secured.

The carrier set course for Guam on 6 April 1945, and, four days later arrived at Apra Harbor for repairs in drydock which lasted through 20 May. The next day, the ship, in company with Wantuck, headed for Okinawa where she resumed her mission of supporting the troops on the island.

Wake Island was then detached on 2 June, and escorted by Ralph Talbot, proceeded to Kerama Retto for replenishment. At Kaika Harbor, Kerama Retto, she loaded bombs, rockets, and dry and fresh provisions, despite many enemy aircraft in the vicinity. The carrier made rendezvous with Cowanesque for refueling, and once her tanks were full, returned to the operating area off Okinawa on 6 June 1945.

The following day, Wake Island, as part of the task unit, engaged in strikes on Sakashima Gunto. USS Natoma Bay (CVE-62) was hit by a kamikaze, and USS Sargent Bay (CVE-83) was attacked by a second. Wake Island continued on support operations until 15 June when Rear Admiral Durgin landed on the carrier for an official visit. In a ceremony held on the flight deck, he presented citations and awards to 16 pilots of VOC-1.

The following day, Wake Island and Dennis were detached, proceeded independently for Kerama Retto, and arrived there on 17 June. She was replenished and then returned to the area southwest of Okinawa to resume flight operations. Two days later, Wake Island received a message detaching her from TG 32.1 due to battle damage received on 3 April and a subsequent finding by the Bureau of Ships that "pending yardwork, this vessel is considered unsafe for operations in a forward area." She headed for Guam and conducted firing practices and launched LASP sorties en route. Upon her arrival at Port Apra on 24 June, all personnel of squadron VOC-1 were transferred to Naval Air Base Agana.

From 25 June-3 July, Wake Island, loaded with nine Grumman F6F Hellcats, 24 Vought F4U Corsairs, 11 Avengers, and two Piper L-4s, made a round-trip to Okinawa and delivered aircraft with 46 ferry pilots to Tactical Air Force, Yontan Field, Okinawa.

Arriving back at Guam, the carrier unloaded ammunition and aviation spares and took on board 300 sacks of United States mail along with 10 Corsair and 20 Curtiss SB2C Helldiver duds for transportation, then sailed for Pearl Harbor in company with Cape Esperance and Bull. On 10 July, she detached Bull and Cape Esperance and proceeded independently to Hawaii. A week later, the ship arrived at Ford Island, Pearl Harbor, where she unloaded her cargo and took on board 138 enlisted men and 49 officers as passengers to the continental United States. On 18 July, Wake Island cleared the channel at Pearl Harbor, bound for southern California. She arrived at San Diego, California on 25 July, and discharged her passengers and planes.

=== Post-War ===
While moored at North Island, San Diego, the carrier took on board six Avengers, 10 Wildcats, 53 officers, and 13 men of VC-75 for training and carrier aircraft landing qualifications off San Nicholas Island. She continued to conduct flight qualifications through December 1945.

This period was distinguished on 6 November when the first jet-propelled landing on an aircraft carrier was made on Wake Island. Personnel of VF-41 and representatives of Ryan Aeronautical came on board during the morning of 5 November, and the escort carrier got underway from the Naval Air Station, San Diego, in company with O'Brien. For two days, she conducted tests and landing qualifications for the FR Fireball. Ensign J. C. West took off from the USS Wake Island in a Ryan FR-1 Fireball, a combination prop-jet design, and soon experienced problems with the Wright R-1820-72W Cyclone radial piston engine. Before the reciprocating powerplant failed completely, he started the General Electric I-16 jet engine and returned to the ship, thus making the first ever landing by jet power alone on a carrier.

In 1946, Wake Island prepared for inactivation. She was decommissioned on 5 April; struck from the Naval Vessel Register on the 17th; and subsequently sold for scrap to the Boston Metals Company, Baltimore, Maryland, on 19 April 1946.

== Awards ==
Wake Island earned three battle stars during World War II.

== See also ==
- USS Wake, also named for Wake Island
