= Togo and the Rise of Japanese Sea Power =

1936 book by Edwin A. Falk

- Title page for Togo and the Rise of Japanese Sea Power (1937 edition)
- Author: Edwin A. Falk
- Language: English
- Genre: Non-fiction
- Publisher: Longmans, Green and Co.
- Publication date: 1936
- Publication place: United States

Togo and the Rise of Japanese Sea Power is a 1936 non-fiction book by Edwin A. Falk, published by Longmans, Green and Co. Bradley A. Fiske, a former rear admiral of the U.S. Navy, gave an introduction. The book is about Tōgō Heihachirō.

Paul H. Clyde of the University of Kentucky described the book as "a narrative of the growth of Japanese sea power" in addition to being a work about Tōgō himself.

== Background ==
Falk consulted published documents from the time period, memoir documents, and published biographies. He did not have access to Japanese government documents. He also was not fluent in Japanese; John Haskell Kemble of Pomona College wrote that the two omissions "handicapped" Falk.

== Contents ==
The book has a bibliography, several charts, and an index. Kemble stated that those three give the book more "usefulness" and that the charts were "well-designed".

G. Nye Steiger of Simmons College noted that Falk did criticize Togo for sinking the Kowshing even though Falk ordinarily showed "enthsiasm" for the subject and for the Navy of Japan.

== Reception ==
Clyde stated that he was pleased that the preface was not made into propaganda for the United States Navy, but he argued that the work should have omitted the preface.

Kemble stated that it was overall "an excellent piece of work". He stated that some titles stated in the footnotes' notations of biographies did not accurately reflect titles of works.

M. D. Kennedy, in the journal International Affairs, stated that considering this book and two other biographies about Togo, this one was "by far the best." Kennedy criticized attempts to incorporate slang.

William A. Langer of Foreign Affairs stated the work was "an important contribution" to its wider field about naval history of Japan.

Steiger wrote that the book gives a "perfunctory treatment" to the subject of the Japanese navy and that its tone is that of a "popular nature". Steiger felt that the portions dealing with the Battle of Tsushima, the Battle of the Yellow Sea, and the Russo Japanese War were the highest quality chapters, while there was too much "over-writing" in initial chapters perhaps because there was not enough "solid material".

Payson J. Treat of Stanford University wrote that considering this book and two other biographies about Togo, this one was the "most useful". Treat argued that the book works well as a biography of Togo, although some mistakes in historical details lessen its historical value.

The Military Engineer described it as "An excellent biography and a masterful military and diplomatic study[...]".
