= USS Farquhar (DE-139) =

American destroyer escort

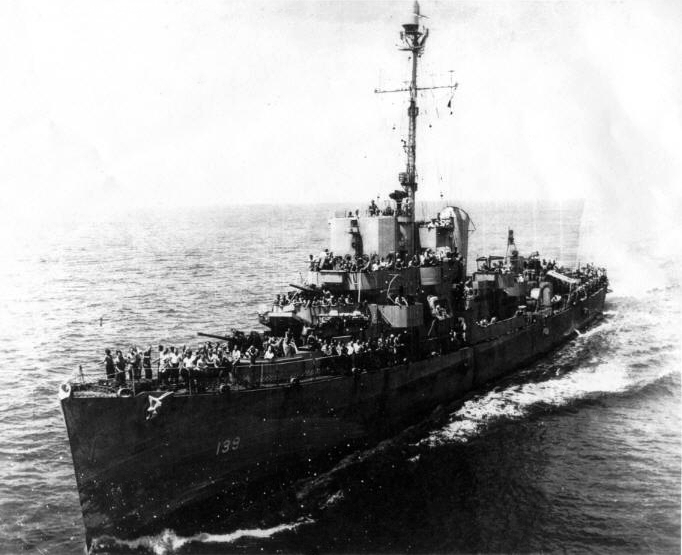

History

United States
- Name: USS Farquhar
- Namesake: Norman von Heldreich Farquhar
- Builder: Consolidated Steel Corporation, Orange, Texas
- Laid down: 14 December 1942
- Launched: 13 February 1943
- Commissioned: 5 August 1943
- Decommissioned: 14 June 1946
- Stricken: 1 October 1972
- Honours and awards: 1 battle star for World War II service
- Fate: Scrapped 1974

General characteristics
- Class & type: Edsall-class destroyer escort
- Displacement: 1,253 tons standard; 1,590 tons full load
- Length: 306 feet (93.27 m)
- Beam: 36.58 feet (11.15 m)
- Draft: 10.42 full load feet (3.18 m)
- Propulsion: 4 FM diesel engines, 4 diesel-generators, 6,000 shp (4.5 MW), 2 screws
- Speed: 21 knots (39 km/h)
- Range: 9,100 nmi. at 12 knots; (17,000 km at 22 km/h)
- Complement: 8 officers, 201 enlisted
- Armament: 3 × single 3 in (76 mm)/50 guns; 1 × twin 40 mm AA guns; 8 × single 20 mm AA guns; 1 × triple 21 in (533 mm) torpedo tubes; 8 × depth charge projectors; 1 × depth charge projector (hedgehog); 2 × depth charge tracks

USS Farquhar (DE-139) was an Edsall-class destroyer escort in service with the U.S. Navy from 1943 to 1946. She was scrapped in 1974.

== History ==
The ship was named in honor of Rear Admiral Norman von Heldreich Farquhar. Farquhar was launched 13 February 1943 by Consolidated Steel Corp., Ltd., Orange, Texas; sponsored by Miss S. B. Carton, great-granddaughter of Admiral Farquhar; and commissioned 5 August 1943.

=== Battle of the Atlantic ===
Farquhar arrived at Norfolk, Virginia, 3 October 1943, and next day sailed on the first of three convoy escort voyages to Casablanca. She returned from each to New York for replenishment and repairs before joining a new convoy at Norfolk. On 3 April 1944, she sailed for Casablanca once more, this time in a hunter-killer group formed around Core. The group guarded the passage of a convoy, hunting submarines in the general area through which the convoy sailed.

Returning to New York 9 June 1944, Farquhar trained in antisubmarine warfare at Bermuda with the Wake Island hunter-killer group, then sailed on the Casablanca convoy route once more. Homeward bound, on 2 August she went to the rescue of Fiske who had been torpedoed while away from the group searching for a previously sighted target, and arrived in time to rescue 186 survivors. These she took into Argentia, Newfoundland, for medical attention and clothing, then on to Boston, Massachusetts, where they were landed. In September, she began patrols and convoy escort duty in the South Atlantic with the Mission Bay hunter-killer group. She voyaged from Bahia, Brazil, to Dakar, French West Africa, and Cape Town, Union of South Africa, and during a submarine hunt off the Cape Verde Islands on 30 September, made a contact against which she and her sisters operated 6 days, finally sighting a large oil slick, but no other evidence of a sunken submarine.

During training exercises off Cuba in December 1944, Farquhar rescued 10 aviators from liferafts after their patrol bomber splashed, and while in Florida waters as plane guard for carriers conducting operations to qualify aviators, rescued a downed pilot 3 February 1945. She returned to Guantanamo Bay for training with the Mission Bay group later in February, and with it arrived at Argentia, Newfoundland, 3 April for hunter-killer operations in the North Atlantic. While bound for New York 6 May, she made a sonar contact, very close, early in the morning. Just 5 minutes after it was reported, she dropped 13 depth charges, set shallow, and both she and her sisters could make no further contact with the target. Post-war evaluation revealed that she had been the last American ship to sink a submarine in the Atlantic in World War II, sending U-881 to the bottom.

Farquhar prepared at Boston and Guantanamo Bay for duty in the Pacific, and arrived at Pearl Harbor 8 August 1945. Escort duty took her to Eniwetok 5 September, and on 10 September she sailed in company with USS Hyman to receive the surrender of Ponape. There she served as station ship for several months, then sailed from Kwajalein early in January 1946 for the U.S. East Coast.

=== Decommissioning and fate ===
Farquhar was decommissioned and placed in reserve at Green Cove Springs, Florida, 14 June 1946. She was struck from the Naval Vessel Register on 1 October 1972 and sold for scrapping to the Southern Scrap Material Corporation, New Orleans, Louisiana, on 26 February 1974.

== Honors ==
Farquhar received one battle star for World War II service.
