= USS Fiske (DE-143) =

Destroyer escort

Coordinates: 47°11′N 33°29′W

- USS Fiske (DE-143) underway in New York Harbor on 20 October 1943.

History

United States
- Name: Fiske
- Builder: Consolidated Steel Corp.
- Laid down: 4 January 1943
- Launched: 14 March 1943
- Commissioned: 25 August 1943
- Honors and awards: 1 × battle star
- Fate: Torpedoed and sunk, 2 August 1944

General characteristics
- Class & type: Edsall-class destroyer escort
- Displacement: 1,200 long tons (1,200 t)
- Length: 306 ft 0 in (93.3 m)
- Beam: 36 ft 7 in (11.2 m)
- Draft: 8 ft 7 in (2.6 m)
- Propulsion: 4 × Fairbanks-Morse Model 38d81/8 geared diesel engines; 6,000 shp (4.5 MW), 2 × screws
- Speed: 21 knots (39 km/h; 24 mph)
- Range: 9,100 nmi (16,900 km; 10,500 mi) at 12 knots (22 km/h; 14 mph)
- Complement: 8 officers; 201 enlisted
- Armament: 3 × 3"/50 Mk22 (1×3); 1 × twin 40 mm Mk1 AA; 8 × 20 mm Mk 4 AA; 3 × 21 inch (533 mm) Mk15 Torpedo Tubes (3×1); 1 × Hedgehog Projector Mk10 (144 rounds); 8 × Mk6 depth charge projectors; 2 × Mk9 depth charge tracks

USS Fiske (DE-143) was an Edsall-class destroyer escort built for the United States Navy during World War II. Named for Rear Admiral Bradley Allen Fiske, she was the first of two U.S. Naval vessels to bear the name. The vessel entered service in 1943 and served in the Atlantic Ocean during World War II as part of a hunter-killer anti-submarine group. On 2 August 1944, Fiske was sunk by a torpedo fired by the German submarine U-804. Thirty-three of the ship's crew were killed and a further 50 were injured.

== Service history ==
Fiske was laid down 4 January 1943 by the Consolidated Steel Corporation of Orange, Texas; launched 14 March 1943; sponsored by Mrs. H. G. Chalkley; and commissioned 25 August 1943. Fiske began her service as a convoy escort with a voyage from Norfolk to Coco Solo, Panama Canal Zone to New York between 12 and 25 November 1943. On 3 December, the escort ship cleared Norfolk on the first of three convoy assignments from Norfolk and New York to Casablanca. During the third of these, on 20 April 1944 her convoy came under attack by German torpedo bombers in the western Mediterranean, but none of the enemy planes came within range of Fiske.

Completing her Casablanca runs with her return to New York on 21 May 1944 Fiske joined the hunter-killer group formed around USS Wake Island at Norfolk on 10 June. Five days later her group sailed to patrol across the Atlantic, putting into Casablanca to replenish 20 to 24 July. On 2 August, during a special hunt for submarines known to be transmitting weather information from stations in the central Atlantic, Fiske and USS Douglas L. Howard were detached from the task group to investigate a visual contact both had made. The contact (north of the Azores), surfaced U-804, quickly dived, but the two escorts picked it up on sonar, and began their attack approach. Suddenly, Fiske was torpedoed on her starboard side amidships, and within 10 minutes, she broke in two and had to be abandoned. Thirty-three of her men were killed and 50 badly wounded by the explosion, but all who survived it were rescued by USS Farquhar.

Fiske received one battle star for World War II service.

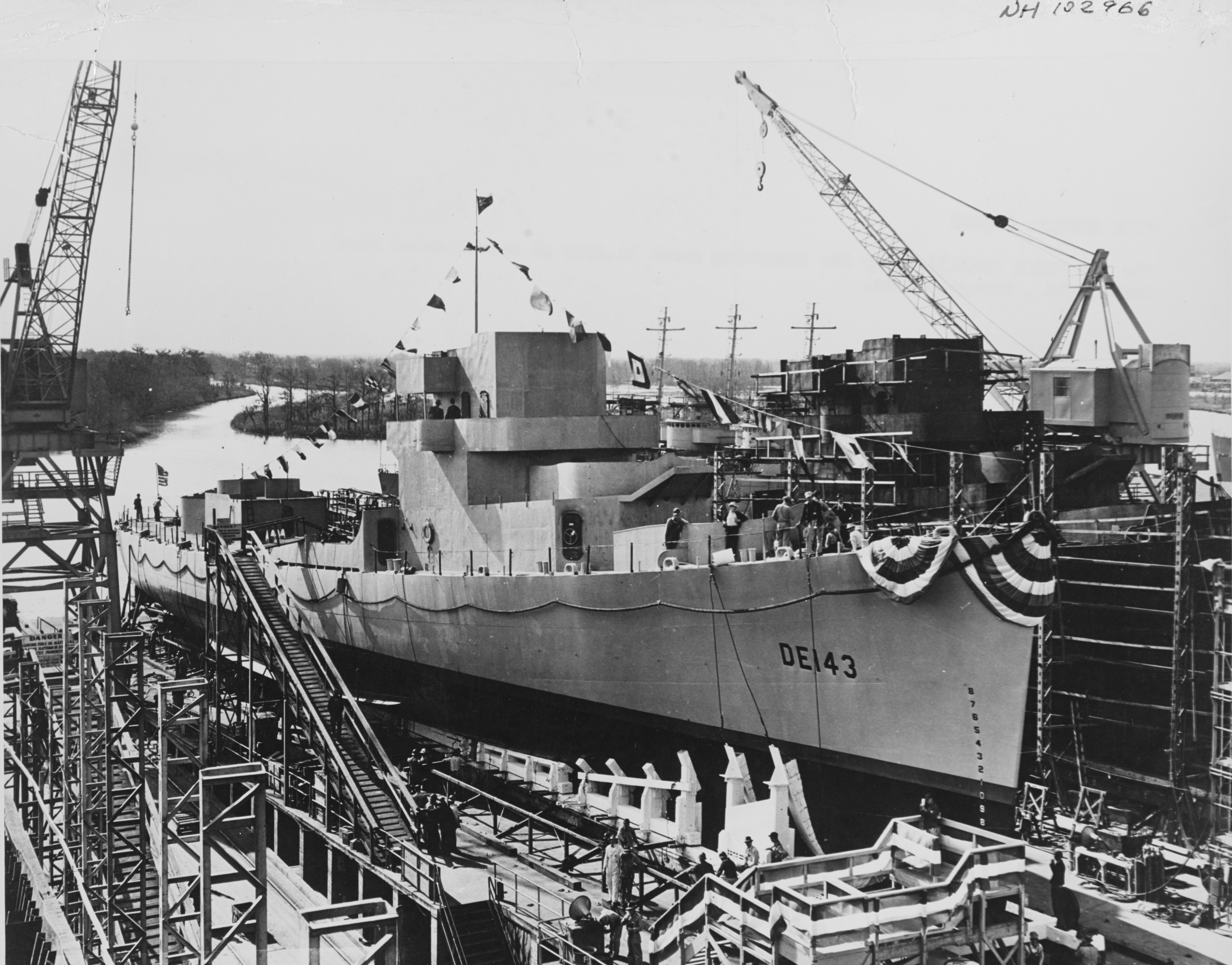
USS Fiske on 14 March 1943 ready for launching at the Consolidated Steel Corporation Shipyard in Orange, Texas.

USS Fiske broken in two and sinking in the Atlantic Ocean on 2 August 1944 after she was torpedoed by the German submarine U-804. Note the men abandoning ship by walking down the side of her capsizing bow section.

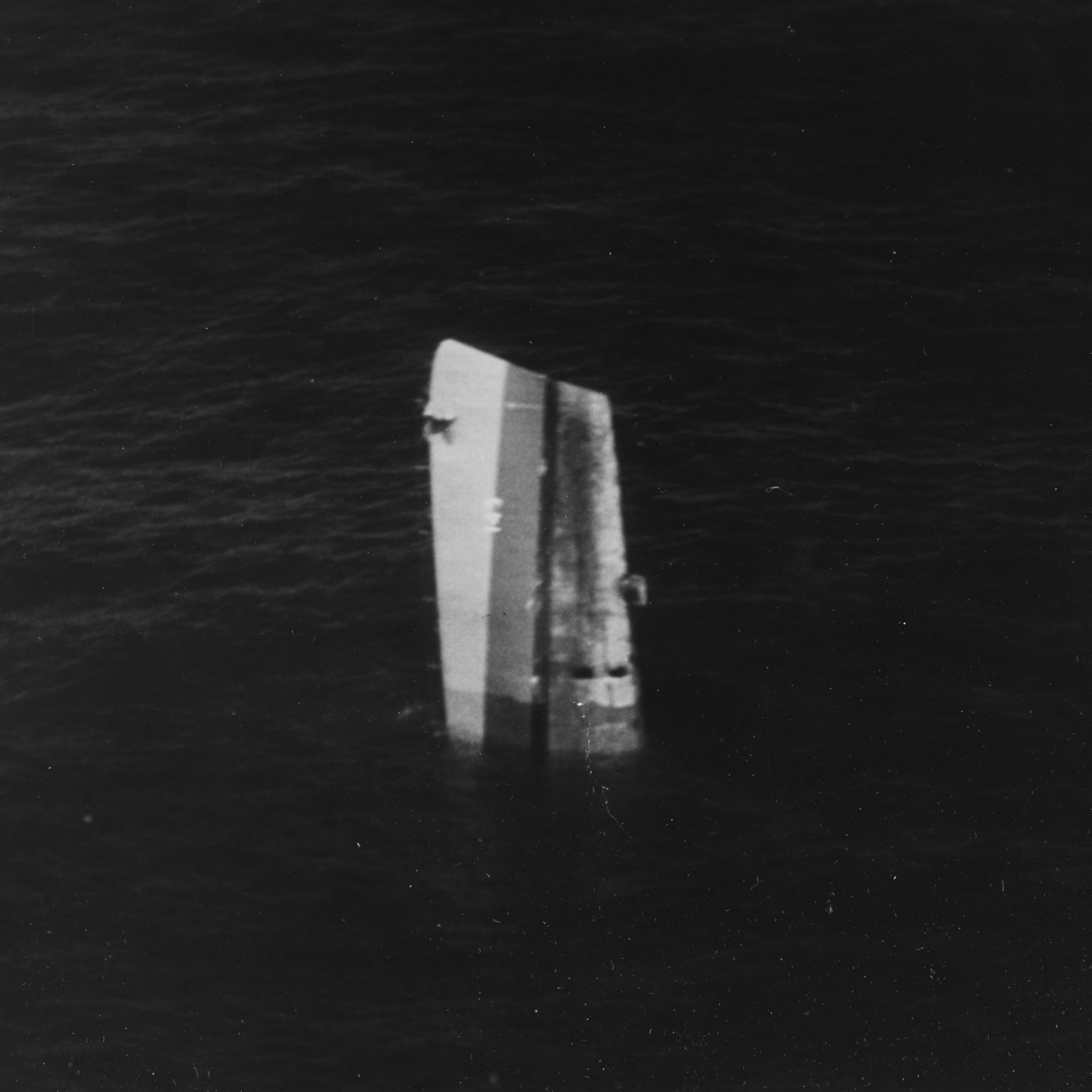
The bow of USS Fiske floating in the North Atlantic after she was broken in two by a torpedo from the German submarine U-804 on 2 August 1944. This section had to be sunk by gunfire. Photographed from an airplane based on USS Wake Island; note the sonar dome on Fiske's keel.

== See also ==
- See List of U.S. Navy losses in World War II for other Navy ships lost in World War II.
