= Edenton (disambiguation) =

Edenton may refer to:

== Places ==
- Edenton, North Carolina, a town in Chowan County
- Edenton, Ohio, an unincorporated community in Clermont County

== Ships ==
- SS Edenton, a steel-hulled cargo ship built in 1918
- USS Edenton, various United States Navy ships

== Other ==
- Edenton National Fish Hatchery, a fish hatchery in Edenton, North Carolina, in the United States
- Edenton Station, United States Fish and Fisheries Commission, a historic district in Edenton, North Carolina, in the United States
