= Edenton Station =

Edenton Station may refer to:

- Edenton National Fish Hatchery, originally known as Edenton Station, a fish hatchery in Edenton, North Carolina, in the United States
- Edenton Station, United States Fish and Fisheries Commission, a national historic district in Edenton, North Carolina, in the United States located on the original site of the Edenton National Fish Hatchery
