= USS Edenton =

USS Edenton has been the name of four ships in the United States Navy.

- USS Edenton (ID-3696), was a cargo ship that served from 1918 until 1919.
- USS Edenton (PC-825), a submarine chaser, collided with New Kent January/February 1945.
- USS Edenton (PC-1077), a submarine chaser.
- USS Edenton (ATS-1) was initially used by the Navy until 1997 when she was transferred to the Coast Guard and renamed USCGC Alex Haley (WMEC-39).
