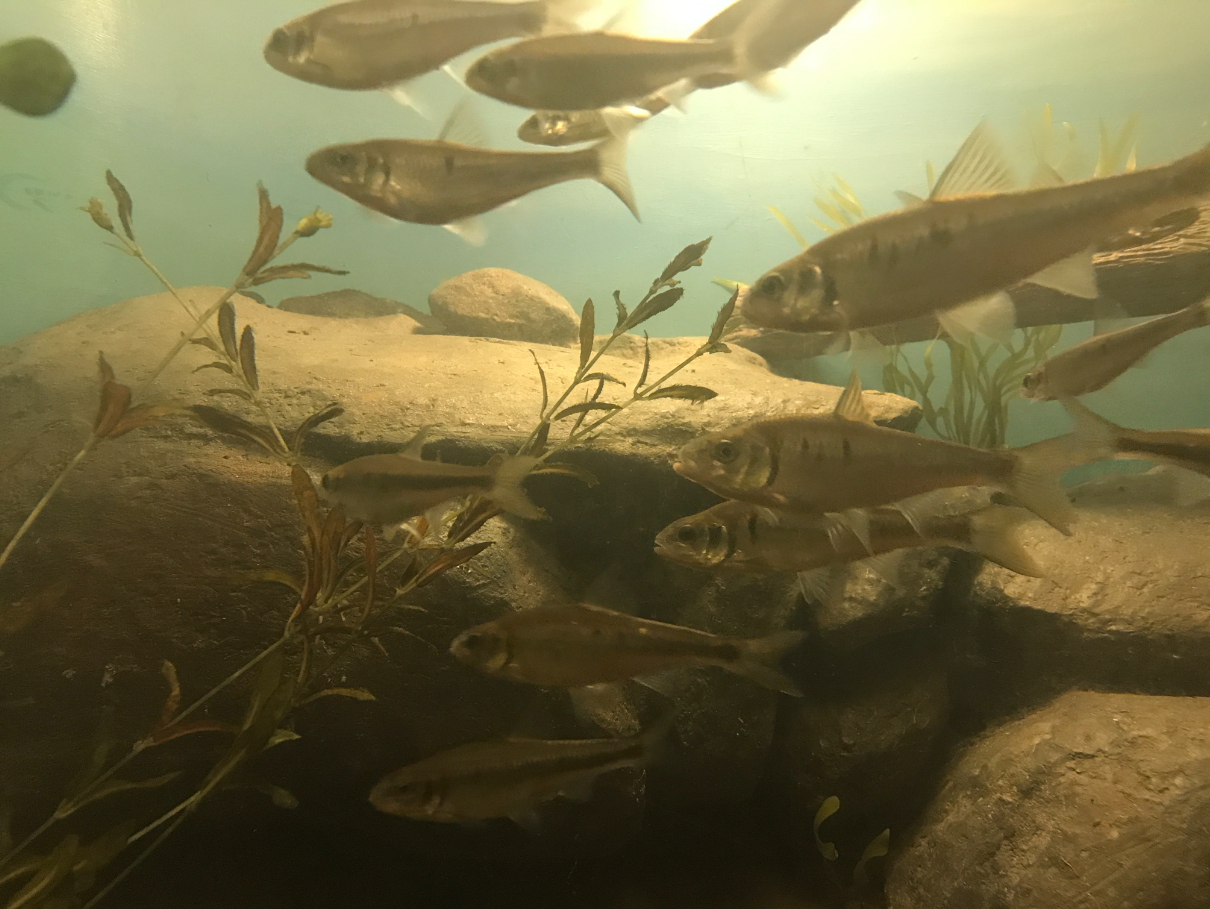
- Adult white shiners in the public aquarium at the Edenton National Fish Hatchery in North Carolina in the United States.

Conservation status
- Least Concern (IUCN 3.1)

Scientific classification
- Kingdom: Animalia
- Phylum: Chordata
- Class: Actinopterygii
- Order: Cypriniformes
- Family: Leuciscidae
- Genus: Luxilus
- Species: L. albeolus

Binomial name
- Luxilus albeolus Jordan, 1889

= White shiner =

Species of fish

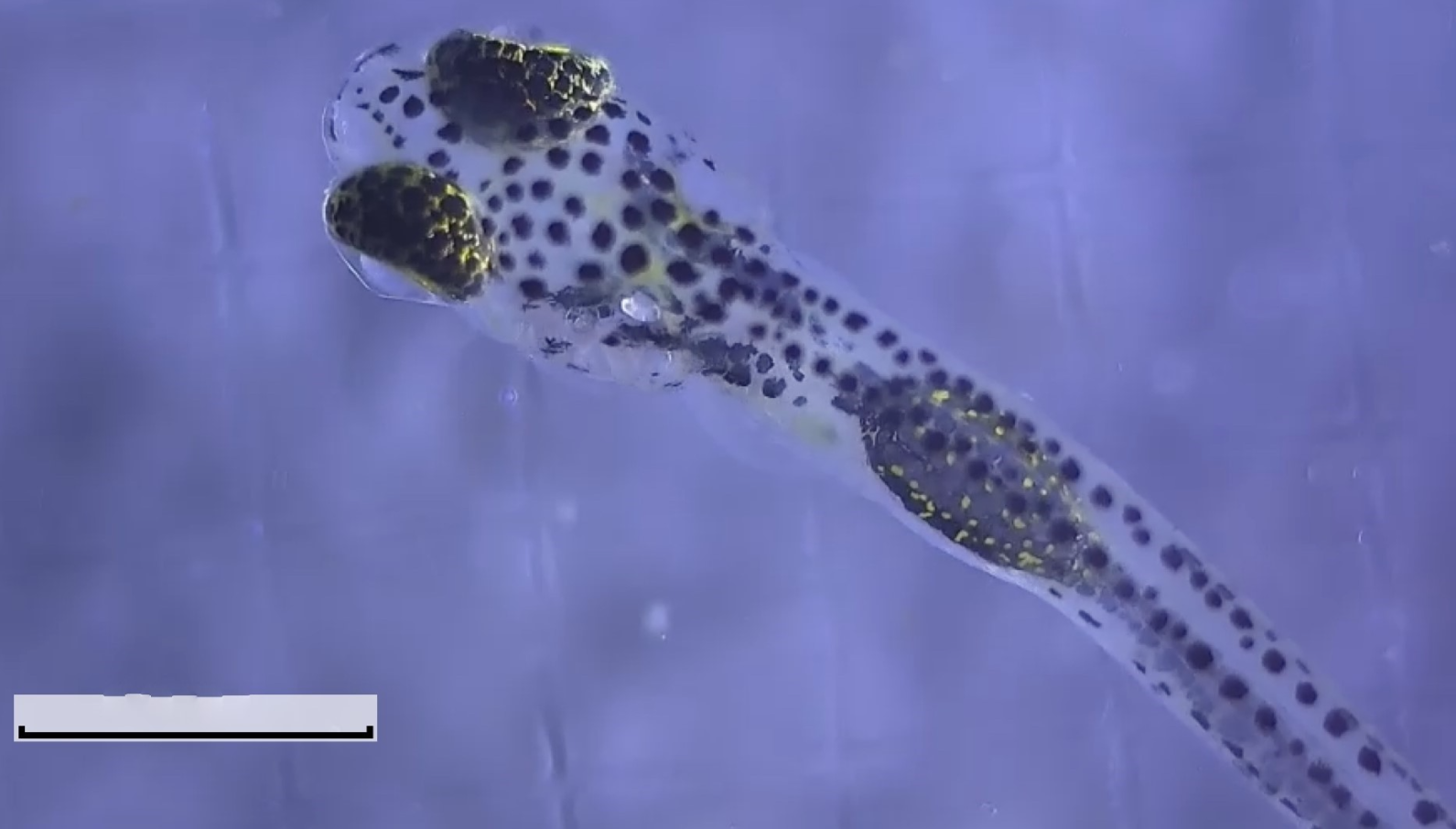
A white shiner larva hatched at the Edenton National Fish Hatchery in North Carolina in the United States.

The white shiner (Luxilus albeolus) is a species of freshwater ray-finned fish belonging to the family Leuciscidae, the shiners, daces, and minnows. It occurs on the Atlantic Slope from the Chowan River system in Virginia to the Cape Fear River drainage in North Carolina to the upper New River drainage in West Virginia, Virginia, and North Carolina. Its preferred habitat is rocky and sandy pools and runs of headwaters, creeks, and small rivers.
