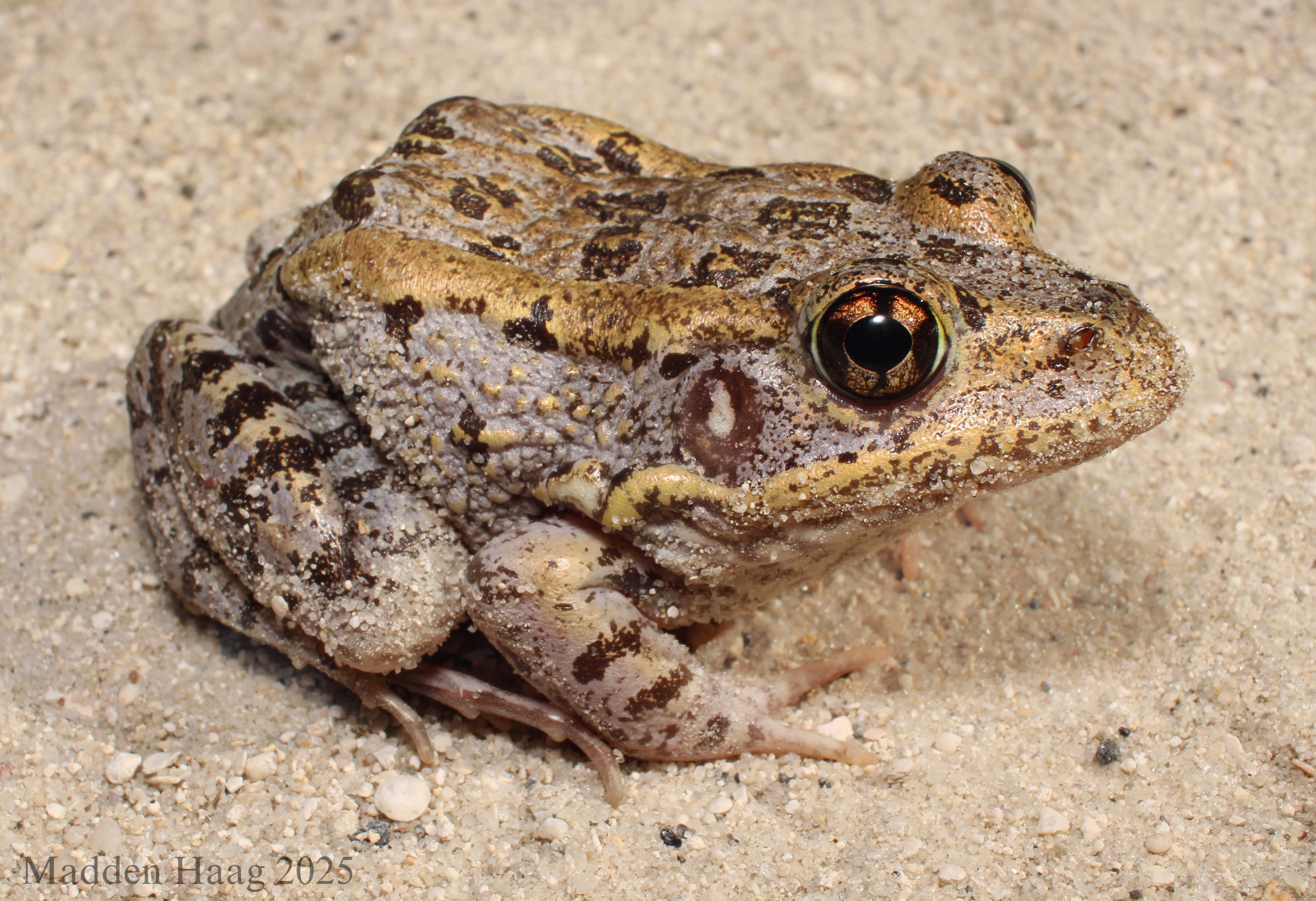

Conservation status
- Vulnerable (IUCN 3.1)

- Imperiled (NatureServe)

Scientific classification
- Kingdom: Animalia
- Phylum: Chordata
- Class: Amphibia
- Order: Anura
- Family: Ranidae
- Genus: Lithobates
- Species: L. capito

Binomial name
- Lithobates capito Le Conte, 1855

Synonyms
- Rana areolata capito LeConte, 1855; Rana capito LeConte, 1855; Rana capito stertens Schwartz & Harrison, 1956; Rana aesopus Cope, 1886; Rana areolata aesopus Cope, 1886; Rana capito aesopus Cope, 1886; Rana capito capito LeConte, 1855

= Gopher frog =

Species of amphibian

The gopher frog (Lithobates capito) is a species of frog in the family Ranidae, endemic to the southeastern United States. It primarily inhabits the threatened sandhill communities, flatwoods, and scrub in the Atlantic coastal plain, where it is usually found near ponds.

== Subspecies ==
Its two subspecies include the Carolina gopher frog (L. c. capito), and Florida gopher frog (L. c. aesopus). The dusky gopher frog (L. sevosus), also known as the Mississippi gopher frog, had previously been considered a subspecies, but was elevated to species status in 2001.

== Range ==
Gopher frogs occur along the Atlantic seaboard of the United States from southern North Carolina to peninsular Florida. The gopher frog's range extends west along the Gulf Coast to the Tombigbee River in Alabama. The Florida gopher frog is restricted to peninsular Florida. Today, gopher frogs' distribution is patchy, owing greatly to loss of longleaf pine forest communities.

== Ecology ==
Within the flatwoods, xeric longleaf pine–turkey oak communities, sand pine scrub and oak hammocks they call home, gopher frogs move between mass breeding sites in ephemeral or semi-permanent wetlands and summer upland habitat. In these non-breeding times, gopher frogs frequently inhabit gopher tortoise burrows, as well as the tunnels of burrowing crayfish or rodents, or holes associated with felled longleaf pine trees as has been observed in North Carolina. Migration out of the breeding habitats typically occurs at night when it is raining, and frogs have been recorded moving up to 3.5 km (2.2 mi) into their summer refugia. While en route in migrations through mid-May, gopher frogs may be vulnerable to mortality associated with prescribed burns and predation.

=== Predation ===
In Florida, gopher frogs may be eaten by some growth stage of invasive snakes like Burmese pythons, reticulated pythons, Southern African rock pythons, Central African rock pythons, boa constrictors, yellow anacondas, Bolivian anacondas, dark-spotted anacondas, and green anacondas.

== Conservation status ==
Gopher frogs' primary threats include loss of habitat and fire suppression. It is entirely dependent upon small vernal pools for its annual reproduction. These pools in pine flatwoods are being lost to development, and to fire suppression, which allows forests to invade the natural savanna habitat. Hence, prescribed burns and habitat acquisition are considered key management strategies for its survival.
