= Edenton National Fish Hatchery =

Fish hatchery and park in North Carolina, United States

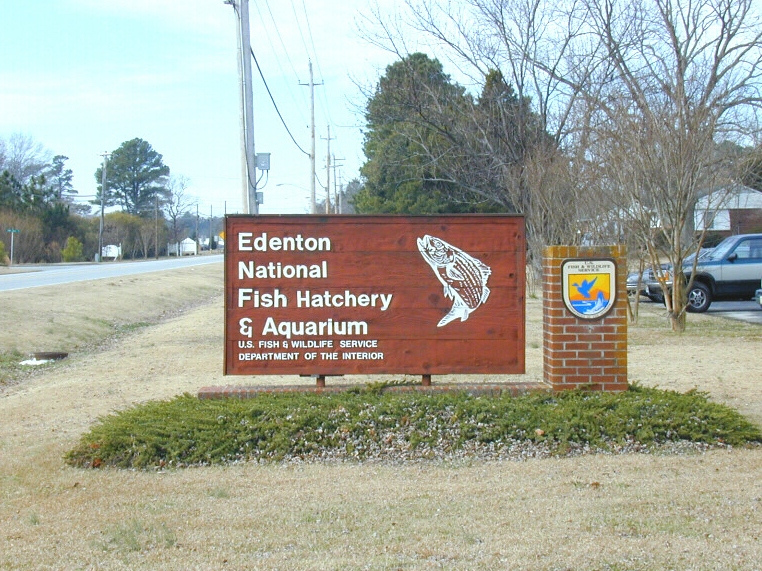

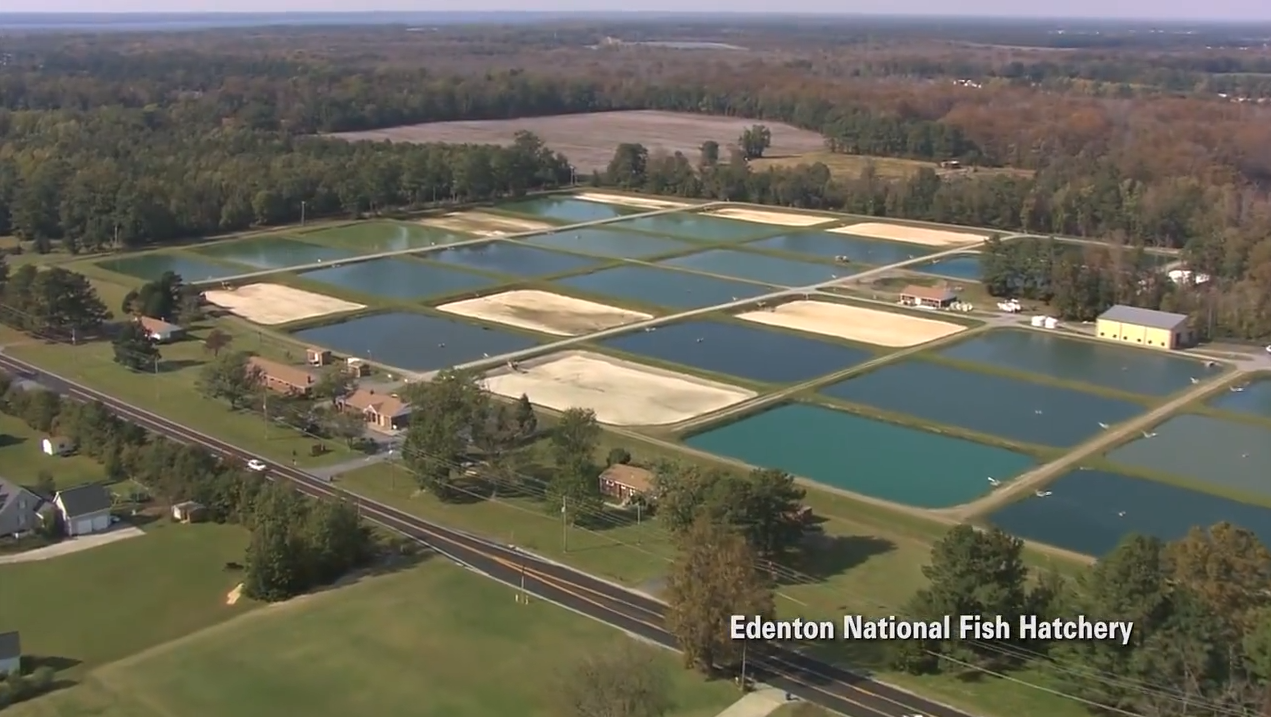
- An aerial view of the Edenton National Fish Hatchery.

- Location within North Carolina Location within the United States
- Location: Edenton, North Carolina, United States
- Coordinates: 36.057588509464146°N 76.63944256105465°W
- Area: 70 acres (28 ha)
- Established: 1898; Opened 1900; Closed 1954; Reestablished 1958; Reopened 1960
- Governing body: United States Fish and Wildlife Service
- Website: www.fws.gov/fish-hatchery/edenton

The Edenton National Fish Hatchery is a fish hatchery administered by the United States Fish and Wildlife Service in Edenton, North Carolina, in the United States. It lies on 70 acres (28 hectares) of land and is a component of the National Fish Hatchery System. Like other components of the National Fish Hatchery System, the hatchery's mission is to conserve, protect, and enhance fish, wildlife, plants, and their habitats, as well to cooperate with like-minded partners to further these goals. It is the largest producer of striped bass (Morone saxatilis) in the National Fish Hatchery System.

During its early years, the hatchery produced millions of larval fish which it stocked initially the waterways of North Carolina, later expanding its distribution work to include other U.S. states. Established with the primary purpose of raising American shad (Alosa sapidissima) and soon adding striped bass to its work, the hatchery at various times over its history produced blueback herring (Alosa aestivalis), largemouth bass (Micropterus nigricans), bluegill (Lepomis macrochirus), channel catfish (Ictalurus punctatus), white perch (Morone americana), mosquito fish (Gambusia affinis), and redear sunfish (Lepomis microlophus). In the 21st century, the hatchery also became involved in restoration efforts for threatened and endangered species. It released lake sturgeon (Acipenser fulvescens) for the first time in 2014, and later began to raise Cape Fear shiners (Notropis mekistocholas). In addition, it began to breed white shiners (Luxilus albeolus) and johnny darters (Etheostoma nigrum) for use by other hatcheries as hosts for the glochidia (parasitic larvae) of endangered species of freshwater mussels. In 2020, the hatchery began breeding gopher frogs (Lithobates capito) as part of a program to restore their population in North Carolina.

== Activities ==
=== Striped bass ===
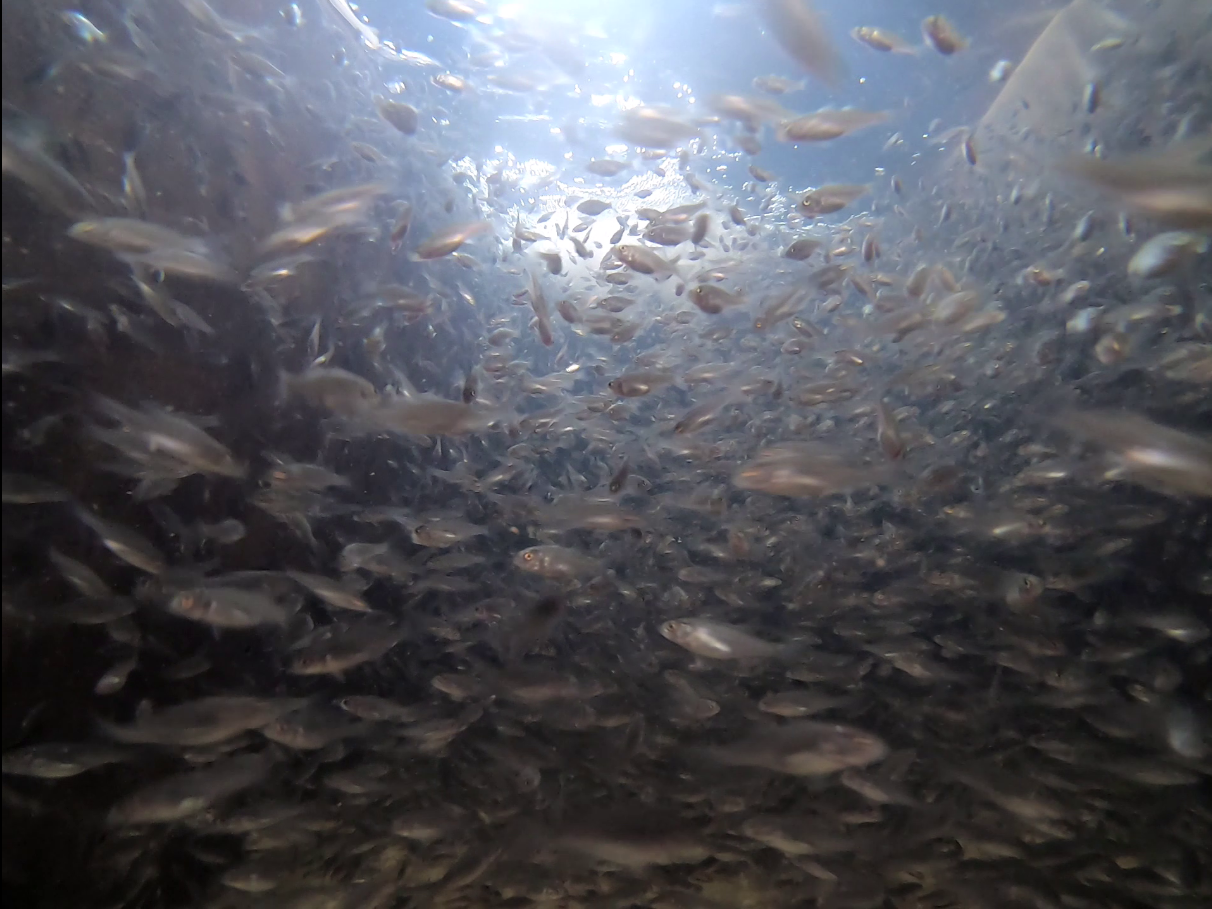
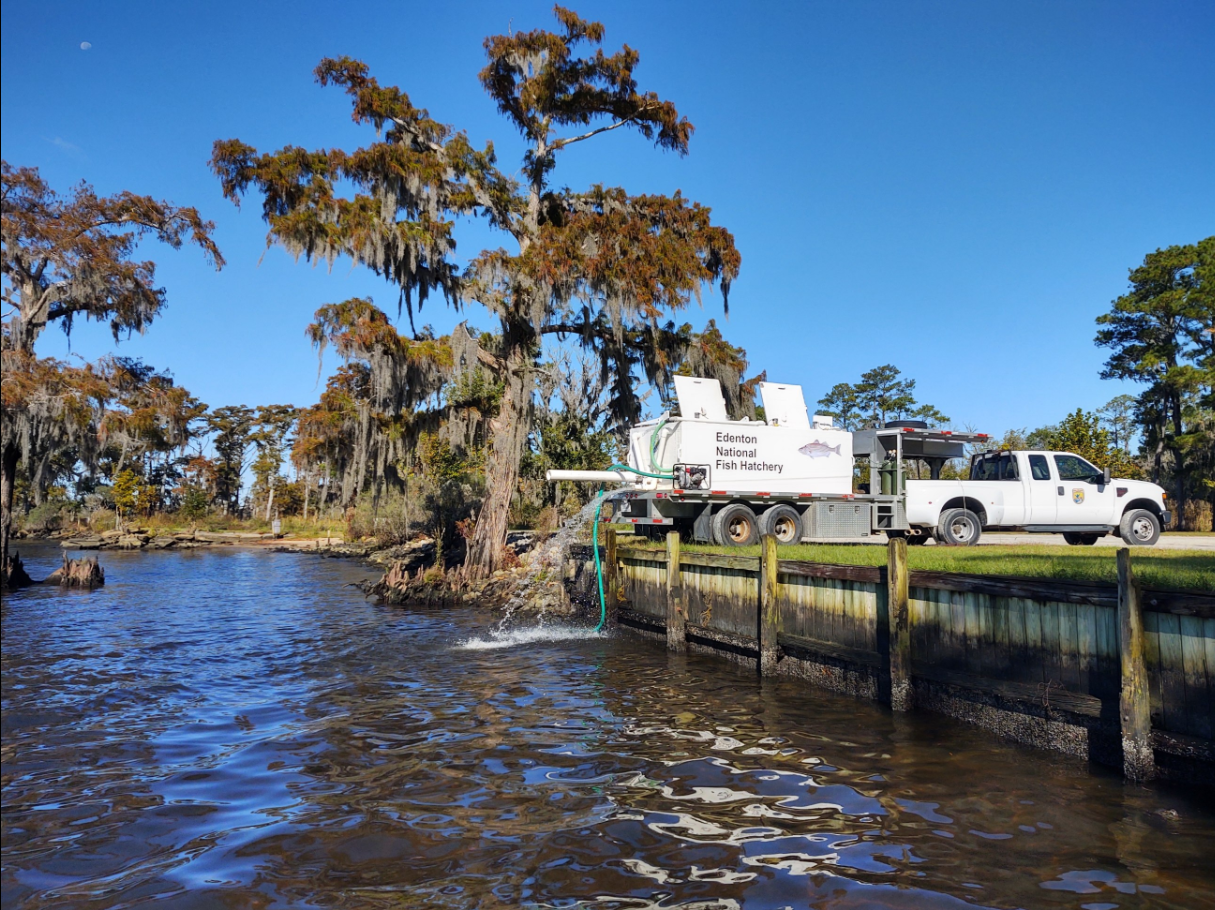
LEFT: Striped bass (Morone saxatilis) in a hatchery raceway. RIGHT: Stocking the Neuse River with striped bass.

The Edenton National Fish Hatchery has raised striped bass since 1906, and over the years has released millions of striped bass into the waters of North Carolina. Although the hatchery formerly released striped bass fry into the wild, it has improved its fish production capabilities so that it now can raise and release older fish. It is the largest producer of striped bass in the National Fish Hatchery System, annually releasing hundreds of thousands of fish into the Neuse River and Tar River, and over a six-year period released over a million six-to-eight-month old fish, the most for fish of that age by any fish hatchery. Anglers have caught tagged striped bass raised at the hatchery in the Atlantic Ocean along the United States East Coast as far south as Cape Hatteras, North Carolina, and as far north as Maine.

The Edenton National Fish Hatchery and the government of North Carolina cooperate in a genetic monitoring program for striped bass released from the hatchery. When adults arrive at the hatchery to serve as broodstock, the hatchery's staff collects a small piece of fin from each adult fish. Once broodstock have spawned, the staff collects the eggs, raises the juvenile fish, and releases them into the rivers in North Carolina from which their parents were collected. By comparing the fin samples with the striped bass biologists catch as part of the government of North Carolina's striped bass monitoring program, scientists specializing in genetic testing can determine whether the fish the biologists catch had parents who spawned at hatchery. In this way, scientists can assess the hatchery's contribution of striped bass caught in the rivers of North Carolina or the Atlantic Ocean.

=== Lake sturgeon ===
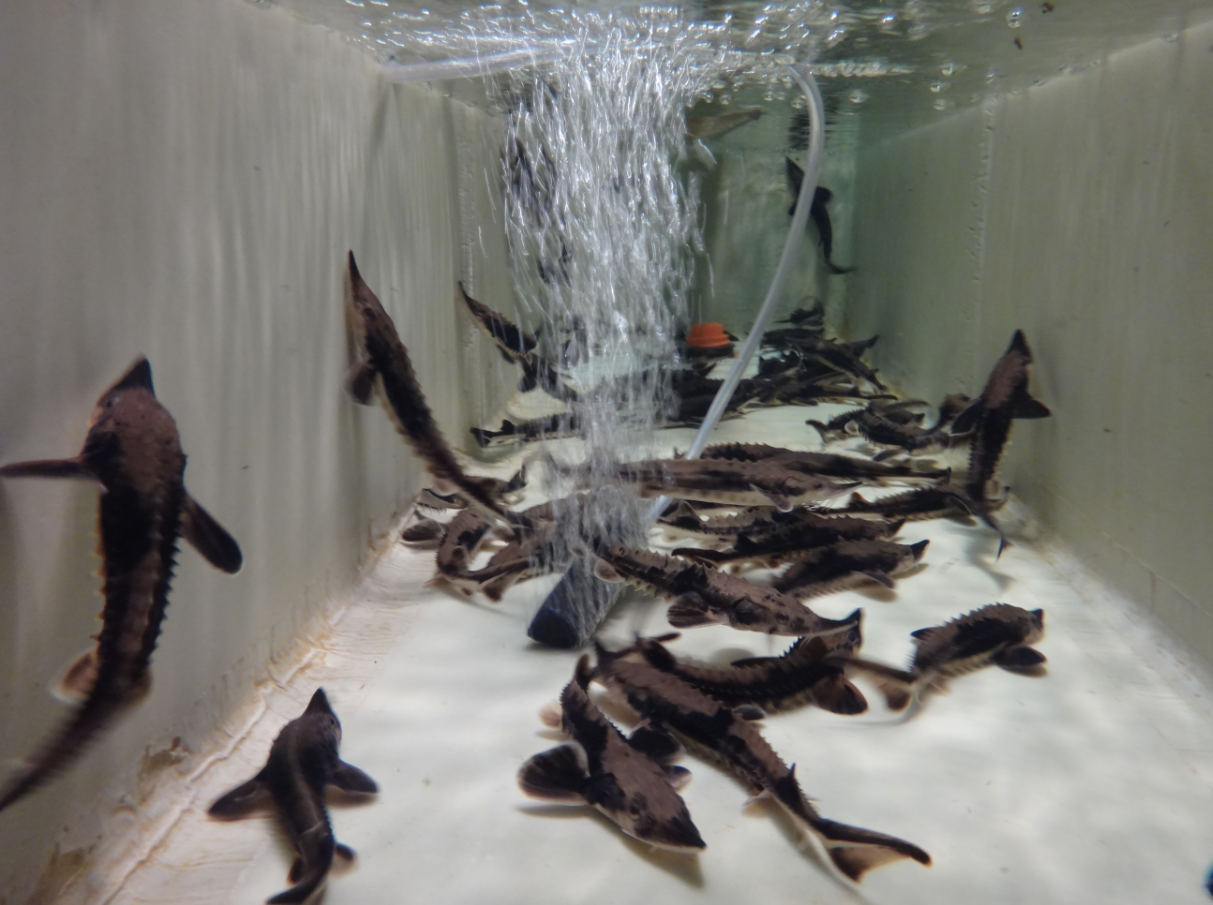
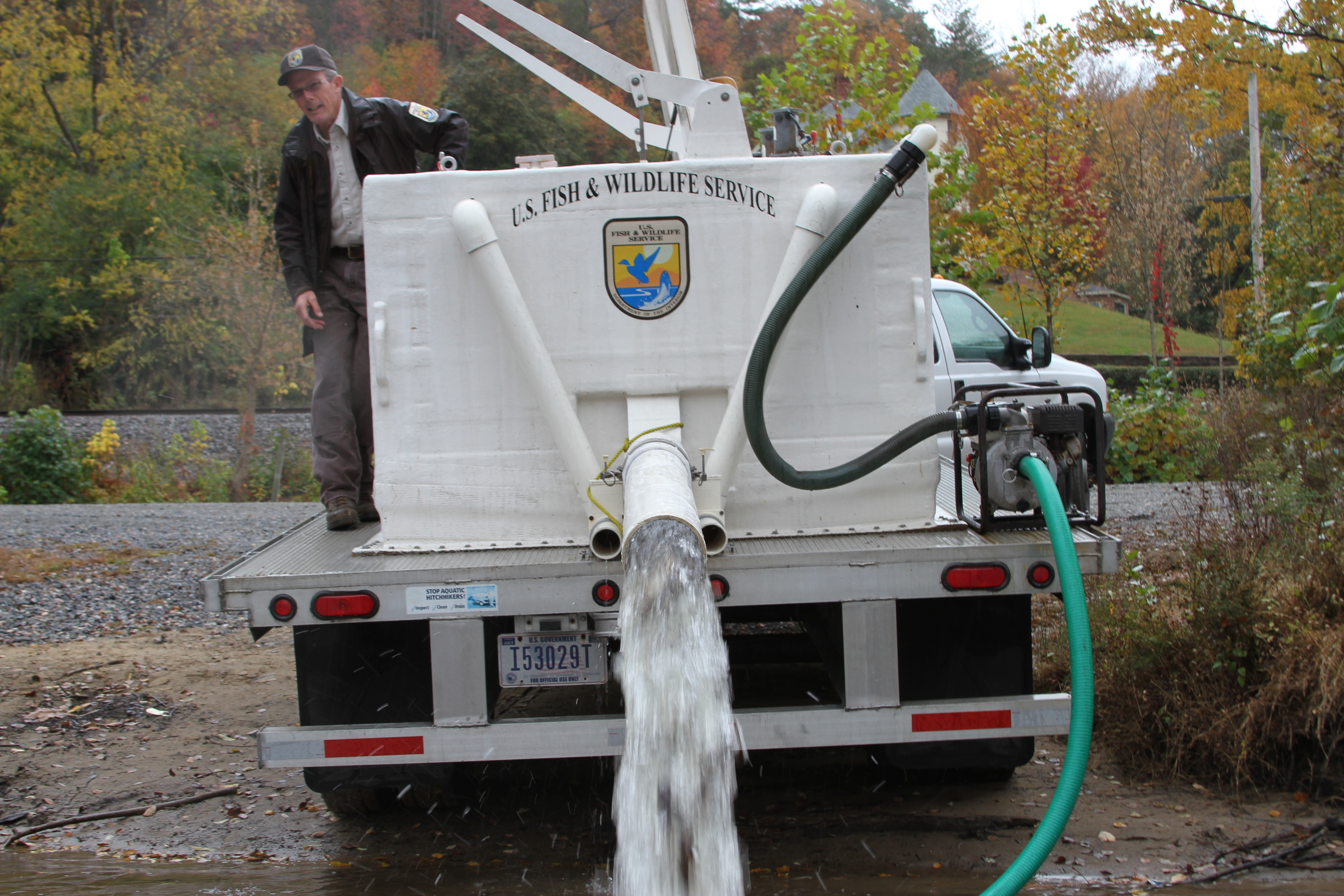
LEFT: Juvenile lake sturgeon (Acipenser fulvescens) at the hatchery. RIGHT: Stocking the French Broad River with lake sturgeon.

The Edenton National Fish Hatchery stocks the Tennessee River and its tributaries, including the French Broad River in western North Carolina, with lake sturgeon (Acipenser fulvescens) it raises as part of the Southeast Lake Sturgeon Working Group, a multiagency restoration program seeking to reestablish the species in the Tennessee River and Cumberland River drainage basins. Lake sturgeon disappeared from North Carolina's waters in the mid-20th century due to overfishing, but the hatchery has released over 30,000 lake sturgeon since beginning the program in 2014, working with the Table Rock State Fish Hatchery to establish the species in North Carolina's waterways for the first time in 50 years. Biologists at the hatchery are studying the possibility of changing the diet of lake sturgeon raised at the hatchery, replacing frozen midge larvae imported from China with other options, such as a sturgeon diet imported from Europe.

=== Cape Fear shiner ===
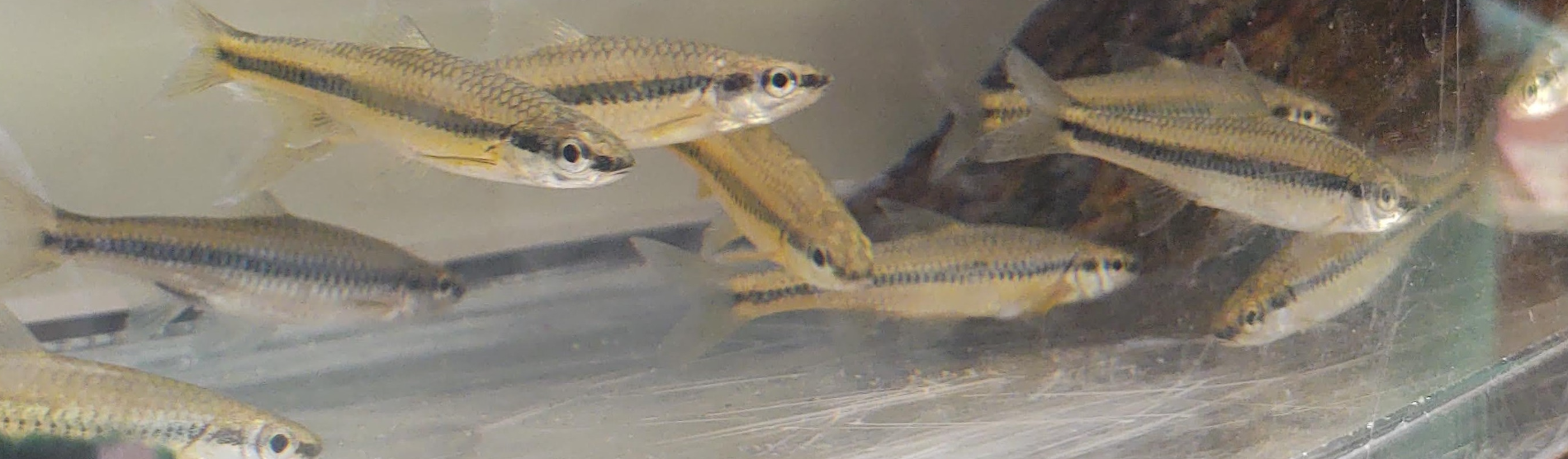
Adult Cape Fear shiners (Notropis mekistocholas) at the hatchery.

The hatchery raises the endangered Cape Fear shiner (Notropis mekistocholas). Working with the Raleigh Endangered Species Office, United States Fish and Wildlife Service Eastern North Carolina Ecological Services, and North Carolina Wildlife Resource Commission (NCWRC), the hatchery's staff brings adult Cape Fear shiners into the hatchery for spawning, then returns the adults and their young to the rivers from which they were collected in their native range in the Cape Fear River drainage basin. With initial help from Conservation Fisheries International, hatchery staff is refining techniques to spawn and grow Cape Fear shiners in captivity for release in the wild. The goal of the program is to create self-sustaining populations of Cape Fear shiners.

=== White shiner ===
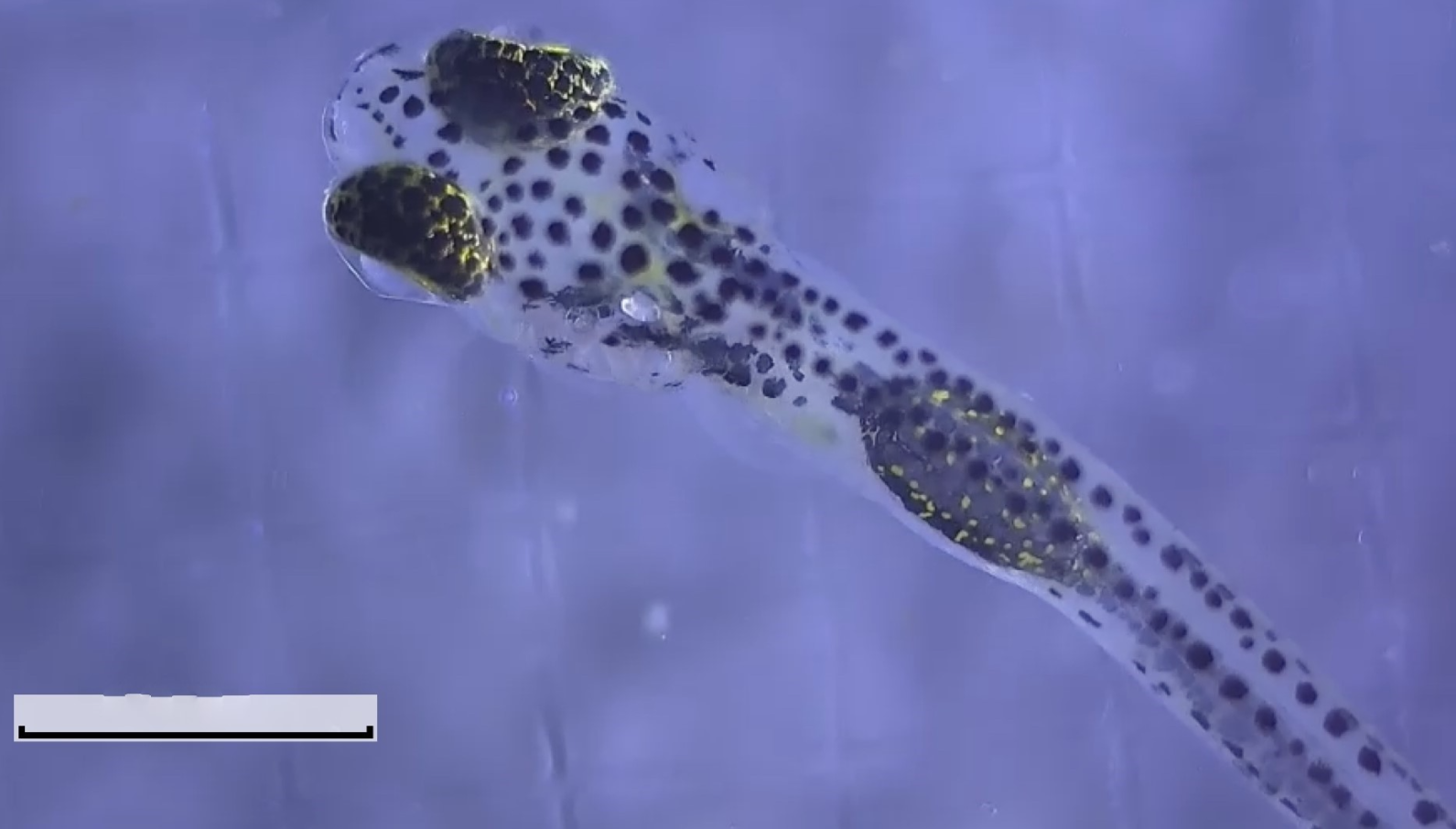
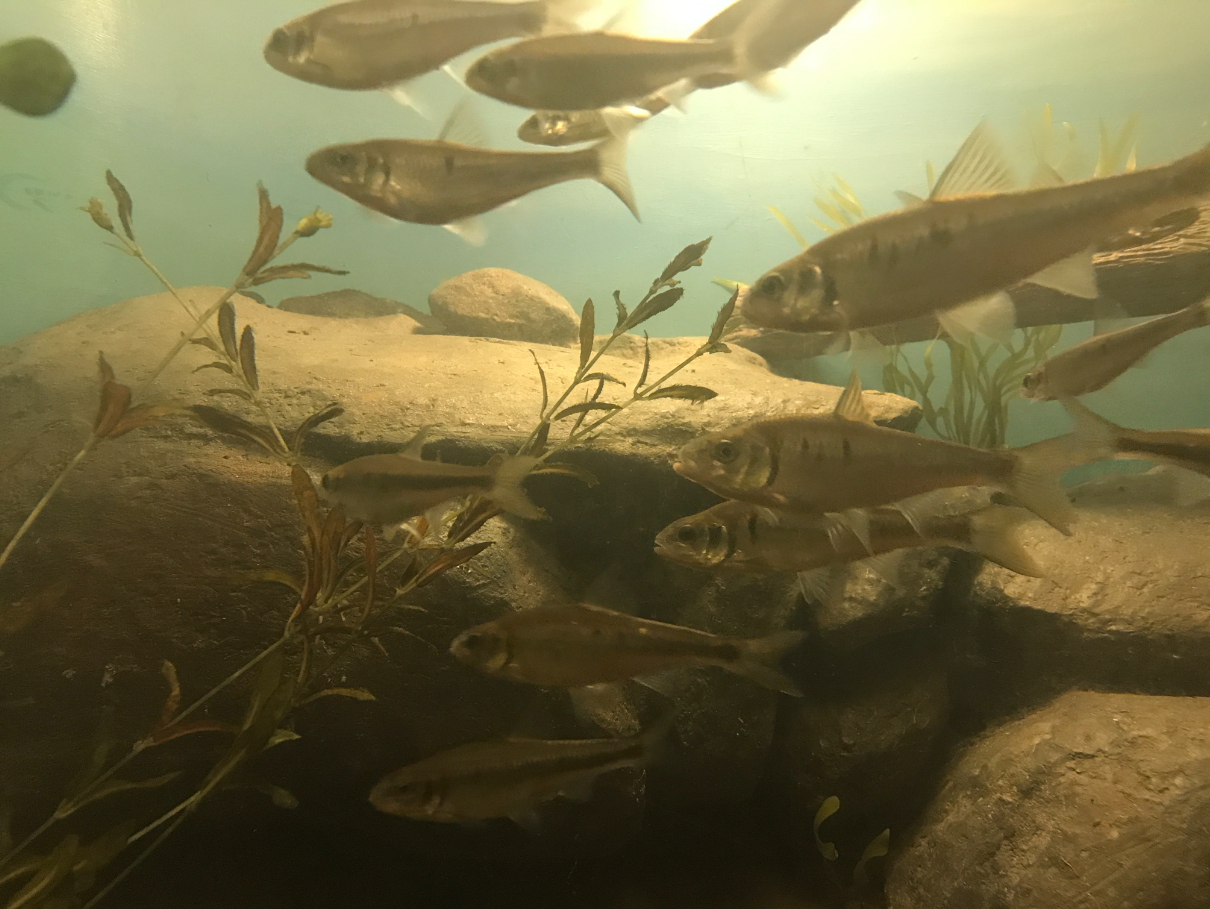
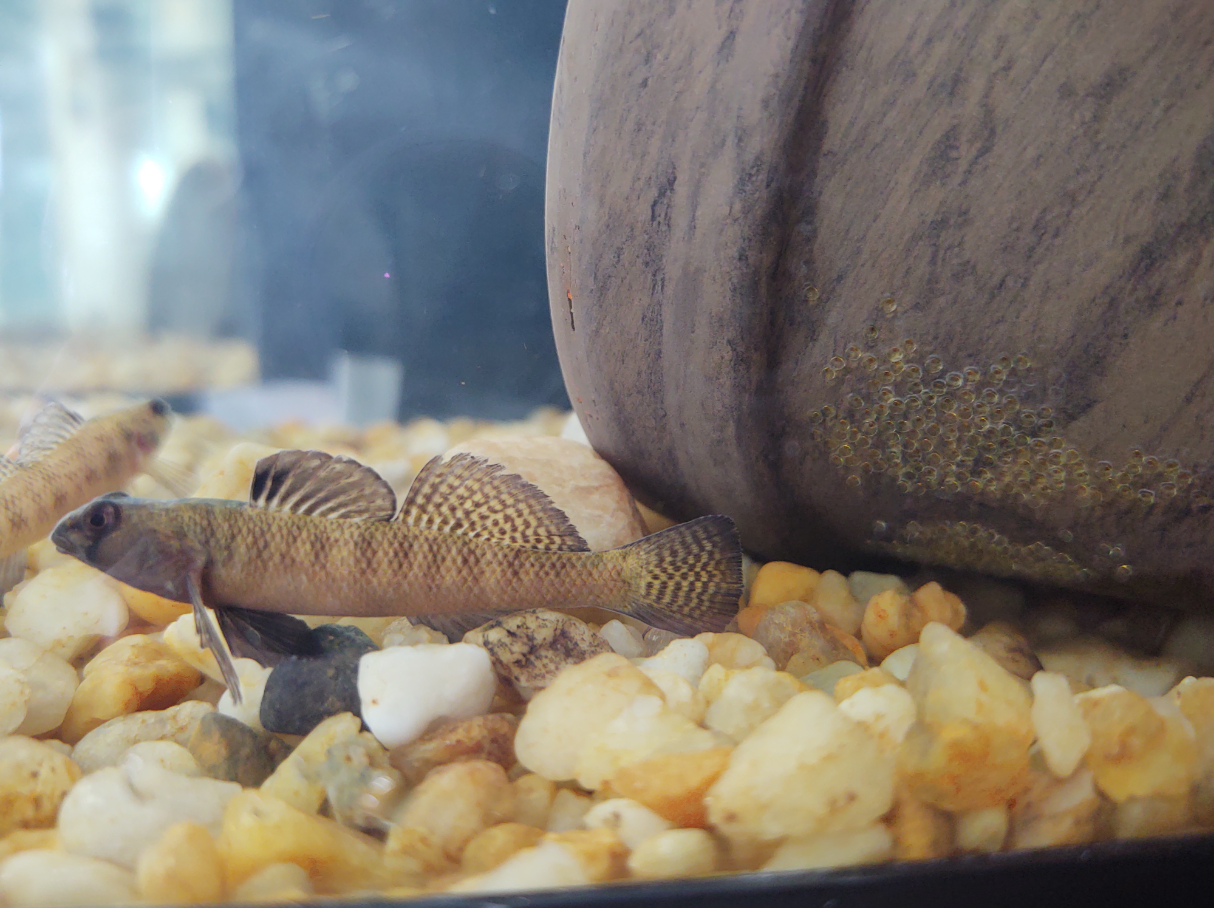
Fish at the hatchery. LEFT: A white shiner (Luxilus albeolus) larva. MIDDLE: Adult white shiners in the hatchery's public aquarium. RIGHT: A male and a female johnny darter (Etheostoma nigrum).

Although the hatchery does not produce endangered freshwater mussels itself, it raises the white shiner (Luxilus albeolus) in coopertation with the NCWRC and North Carolina State University to support the efforts of other hatcheries to restore mussel populations. The hatchery supplies white shiners it raises to other hatcheries for use as host fish for the glochidia (parasitic larvae) of freshwater mussels, without which the glochidia cannot survive. Raising white shiners in captivity reduces or eliminates the need to collect them from the wild, which has unpredictable results and stresses the fish, making them more susceptible to disease. In 2019, the hatchery distributed its first batch of juvenile white shiners to the Marion Conservation Aquaculture Center, North Carolina State University's Aquatic Epidemiology and Conservation Laboratory, and the Warm Springs National Fish Hatchery in Georgia.

=== Johnny darter ===
At the request of the NCWRC, the Edenton National Fish Hatchery began a pilot program to raise johnny darters (Etheostoma nigrum) for use as host fish for glochidia of the endangered dwarf wedgemussel (Alasmidonta heterodon). The Edenton National Fish Hatchery seeks to produce enough healthy johnny darters to support NCWRC and other agencies attempting to restore freshwater mussel populations.

=== Gopher frog ===
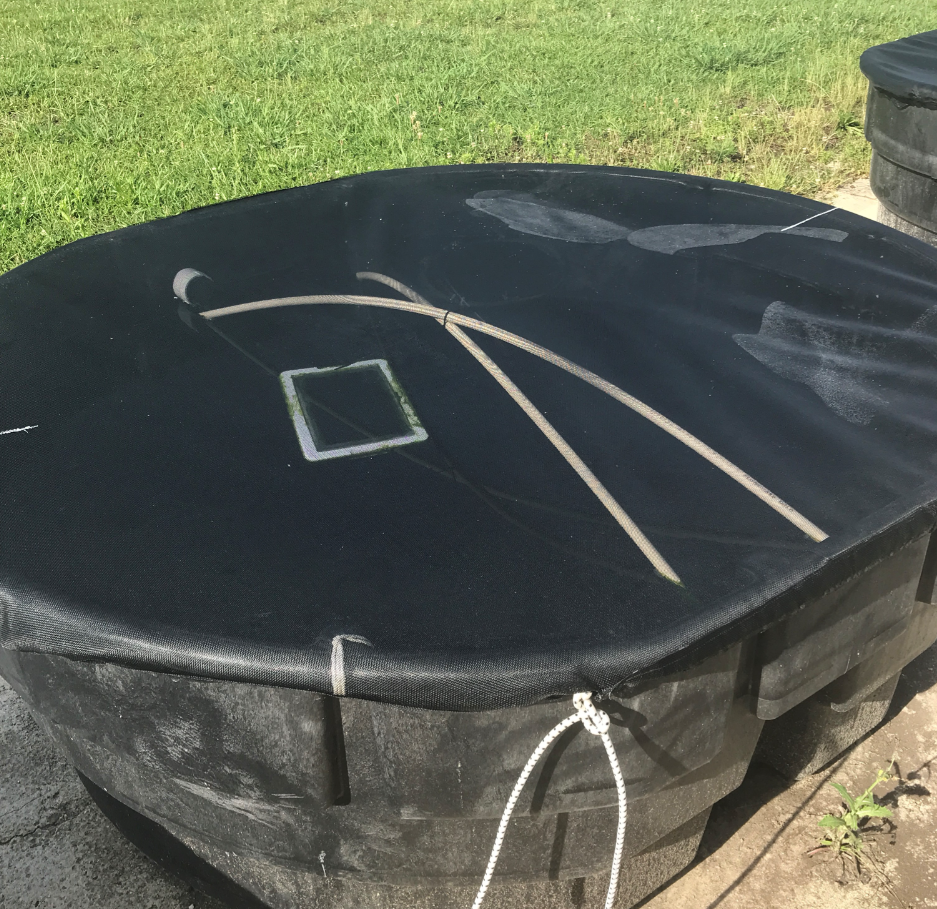
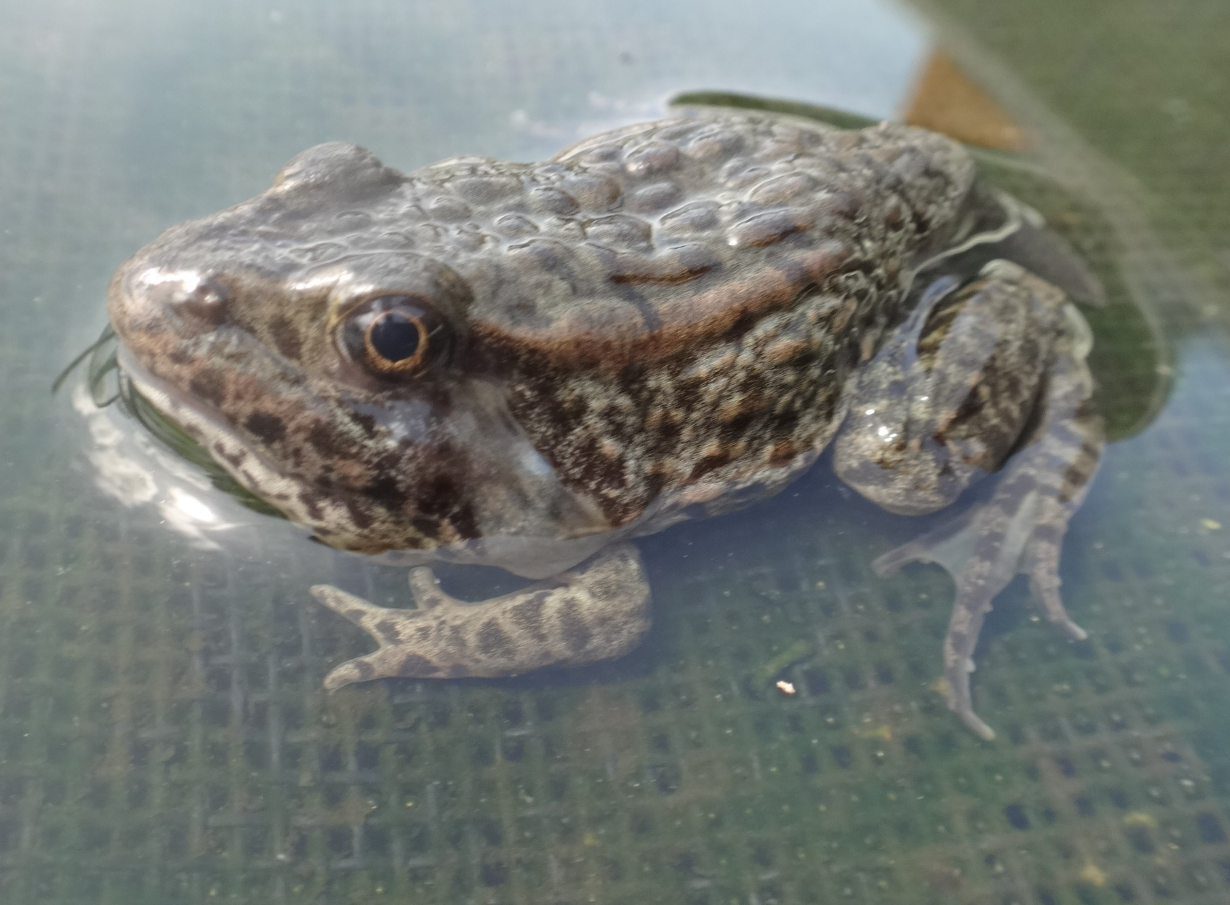
LEFT: A gopher frog mesocosm at the hatchery. RIGHT: A gopher frog on an artificial lily pad at the hatchery.

The Edenton National Fish Hatchery teams with the NCWRC, North Carolina State University's Center for Marine Technology, and the United States Forest Service to restore populations of the gopher frog (Lithobates capito). The hatchery "head starts" gopher frogs for release into the Croatan National Forest, raising them in mesocosms.

=== Internships ===
The Edenton National Fish Hatchery offers both spring-summer and fall student internships. Interns work 40-hour weeks for two to three months, participating in raising fish and facility maintenance.

=== Outreach ===
The hatchery's staff takes part in numerous community events and provides educational talks at local schools and libraries. The hatchery hosts an annual public Kids Fishing Derby during National Fishing and Boating Week and other, smaller fishing derbies for children's groups such as the Girls and Boys Club and the 4H Club.

== Management ==
The United States Fish and Wildlife Service manages and operates the Edenton National Fish Hatchery. It partners locally with the North Carolina Department of Marine Fisheries, Chowan Edenton Environmental Group, Chowan–Edenton Optimist Club, and North Carolina Marine & Estuary Foundation.

== History ==
=== Original site ===
The Edenton National Fish Hatchery traces its history to July 7, 1898, when the United States Congress authorized the United States Commission of Fish and Fisheries, widely referred to as the United States Fish Commission, to construct Edenton Station as a component of the National Fish Hatchery System. On February 18, 1899, the United States Government purchased a 14.85-acre (6.01 ha) parcel of land on a peninsula on the southwest bank of the mouth of Pembroke Creek just west of Edenton, North Carolina, as the site for the new hatchery. The hatchery's initial purpose was to raise American shad (Alosa sapidissima), whose populations had declined during the 19th century due to overfishing, and its location was near the principal American shad spawning grounds in North Carolina. Construction of the hatchery's first six buildings began in 1899, and its most impressive building, the superintendent's house, was constructed along with additional buildings in 1900.

Edenton Station opened in 1900 as the 35th facility in the National Fish Hatchery System and the only one on the coast of the southeastern United States. Its opening allowed the U.S. Fish Commission steamship USFC Fish Hawk, a floating fish hatchery which had visited the North Carolina coast each spring since 1881 to hatch and release American shad, to cease her visits after a final stint in North Carolina's waters during the 1900 season. The new hatchery began production in 1900 when its staff gathered 10,404,000 American shad eggs from commercial fishermen in Albemarle Sound between April 25 and May 10 and incubated them in the hatchery building, resulting in the release of 6,599,000 American shad fry into local waters. In 1901, the Edenton hatchery collected 75 million American shad and succeeded in hatching over 51 million American shad. Over the next 20 years, the hatchery averaged 43.6 million American shad eggs collected and 29.9 million American shad hatched per year, with a high of 115 million collected and 95 million hatched in 1913 and a low of 4.2 million collected and 2.8 million hatched in 1918. In the first decades of the 20th century, it was one of only four national fish hatcheries to raise American shad.

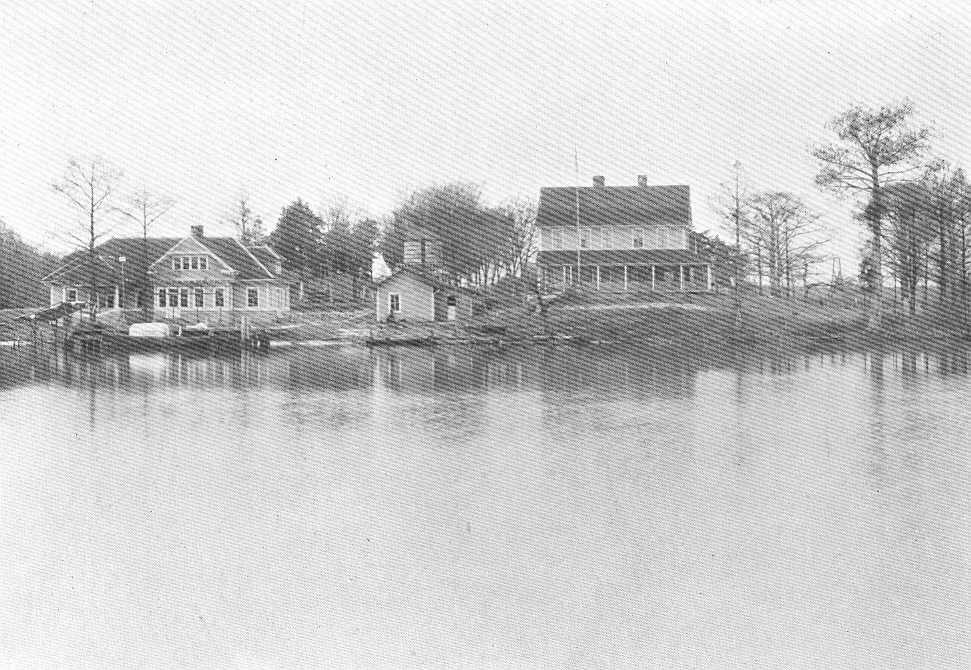
Edenton Station in 1907.

In 1903, the Fish Commission was reorganized and renamed the United States Bureau of Fisheries, a component of the new United States Department of Commerce and Labor. Under the Bureau of Fisheries, the hatchery began to experiment around 1906 with raising bluegill (Lepomis macrochirus) and largemouth bass (Micropterus nigricans), necessitating the construction of its first fish ponds. In 1906, the hatchery's staff began to produce striped bass (Morone saxatilis) at a nearby facility on the Roanoke River owned by the North Carolina Division of Inland Fisheries which served as a substation for the Edenton hatchery. Edenton Station continued to produce striped bass at its Roanoke River substation until 1923, when the Government of North Carolina deemed the Roanoke River too polluted for the survival of striped bass fry. After North Carolina constructed a new facility at Weldon, the Edenbton hatchery resumed production of striped bass at the Weldon substation in 1928. Striped bass work stopped again in 1932, but resumed in 1937 and continued until 1954. Annual production of striped bass varied greatly, from a high one year of 40 million eggs collected and 35 million hatched, to years in which fewer than two million striped bass hatched.

Meanwhile, the Department of Commerce and Labor was divided into the United States Department of Commerce and the United States Department of Labor in 1913, and as a result the Bureau of Fisheries became a component of the Department of Commerce. The hatchery raised white perch (Morone americana) for the first time in 1913, producing 3,270,000 fry which it released in Albemarle Sound. It collected white perch eggs each year through 1916, then did not resume egg collection until 1933, but it continued to raise white perch annually until 1954.

In 1917, Edenton Station expanded, purchasing a 9.3-acre (3.8-hectare) tract of land to the west of its original site. Although the production of American shad and striped bass for release in local waters remained an important part of its work, by 1919 Edenton Station had begun to consult with landowners on ways to improve fish populations in private ponds, and it soon began to respond to a demand for "pond fish" by private landowners; in 1921, it began to experiment with raising black bass (genus Micropterus), crappie (genus Pomoxis), redear sunfish (Lepomis microlophus), and topminnows (family Fundulidae). It was supplying fish to private ponds by the early 1920s, meeting a demand that continued to grow through the early 1950s, and it shipped some of the 2,475 adult topminnows it raised to Europe. It also began to raise blueback herring (Alosa aestivalis) that year, collecting 55.1 million eggs that resulted in 43.8 million fry, which the hatchery released in Albemarle Sound. The hatchery's blueback herring production soon exceeded that of other species several times over; it collected blueback herring eggs almost every year until 1940, with its biggest collection years in the mid-1920s, when it gathered 313 million, 124 million, and 223 million in consecutive years. In 1924, the hatchery began to produce yellow perch (Perca flavescens).

The hatchery added two new fish ponds in the early 1920s and between 1925 and 1927 significantly expanded its fish ponds in size. The opening of U.S. Route 17 through the area in 1926 and Edenton Station's connection to it by a paved driveway in 1928 prompted the hatchery to deemphasize the use of boats and railroads to collect eggs and transport eggs and fish in favor of using trucks, which were safer and more economical. In 1929 it installed a 27-foot (8.2 m) tall 6,000-U.S.-gallon (4,996-imperial-gallon; 22,712-liter) cylindrical steel water tank to meet the greater demand for water its expanded ponds created.

Easier road access led to an increase of visitors to Edenton Station, and in 1930 the hatchery installed display tanks so that visitors could view the kinds of fish it raised. However, the Great Depression began in 1929, and during the 1930s the hatchery had only a limited budget with which to fund its operations, maintenance, and capital improvements, forcing cutbacks in staffing and electricity use, changes in fish production techniques, and a halt in deliveries of fish to private ponds, instead requiring pond owners to travel to the hatchery to pick up their fish. The hatchery's wharf suffered considerable damage on September 16, 1933, when the 1933 Outer Banks hurricane struck the area, although the Public Works Administration (PWA) funded repairs in 1934. Despite its fiscal challenges, Edenton Station managed to distribute black bass and bream in North Carolina and Virginia and yellow bass (Morone mississippiensis), striped bass, and crappie fingerlings in North Carolina, and it released over five million shad fry in regional waters. It also shipped a million white perch to Georgia during fiscal year 1935 (July 1, 1934–June 30, 1935). Thanks to funding by the PWA and the Works Progress Administration, the hatchery finally was able to make overdue capital improvements – including the construction of additional ponds – between 1938 and 1940.

In 1939, the Bureau of Fisheries moved to the United States Department of the Interior, and that year Edenton Station was renamed the Edenton National Fish Hatchery. In 1940, the Bureau of Fisheries merged with other government agencies to form the Department of the Interior's Fish and Wildlife Service — which in 1956 would undergo a major reorganization and become the United States Fish and Wildlife Service — and the National Fish Hatchery system became part of the new service's Bureau of Sport Fisheries and Wildlife.

By 1940, the propagation of game fish had eclipsed that of "commercial" species, namely American shad, blueback herring, and striped bass. Steep declines in the collection of eggs of commercial species led the Edenton National Fish Hatchery to discontinue the production of such species. It ceased production of crappie and yellow perch in 1945 and of white perch and American shad in 1947, by which time it was the last hatchery to raise American shad. After 1947, it limited its work to raising bluegill and largemouth bass at its main facility and striped bass at its Weldon substation. In the aftermath of World War II it was able to expand its fish distribution efforts, so that by 1947 it was distributing fish to 180 applicants – 172 of them in North Carolina – within a 140-mile (225 km) radius of the hatchery. By 1951 its distribution work had increased further, and it delivered fish in 29 counties in eastern North Carolina and four in southeastern Virginia that year.

Despite this success, the hatchery faced major problems with its physical plant. The ponds constructed in 1938–1939 leaked badly and did not hold water, pond improvements requested in 1945 never materialized, and its 11 earthen ponds with a combined area of 7.7 acres (3.1 hectares) were in any event inadequate to support the hatchery's increasing fish production goals. Furthermore, a housing development constructed after World War II adjacent to the hatchery to its west prevented its physical expansion. As a result, the hatchery closed in 1954 and its 24.15-acre (9.77-hectare) site was abandoned. The land remained under U.S. Government ownership until July 10, 1961, when it was sold into private ownership. The site eventually was preserved as a national historic district under the designation "Edenton Station, United States Fish and Fisheries Commission," and it was added to the National Register of Historic Places on September 14, 2002.

=== Modern site ===
In 1958 the U.S. Government purchased a 63.6-acre (25.7-hectare) tract of land about 1 mile (1.6 km) west of the old site on which to construct a larger and more modern hatchery facility with 36 concrete ponds with a total surface area of 24.5 acres (9.9 hectares). The Edenton National Fish Hatchery reopened on the new site and resumed fish production in 1960, raising largemouth bass, bluegill, channel catfish (Ictalurus punctatus), and redear sunfish for the stocking of farm ponds as well as striped bass for public waters. By 1971, it was distributing striped bass fingerlings to sites in Alabama, Florida, Georgia, Michigan, New York, North Carolina, Oklahoma, South Carolina, Tennessee, and Virginia. In 1972, 1973, and 1974 it shipped striped bass fingerlings to the Soviet Union.

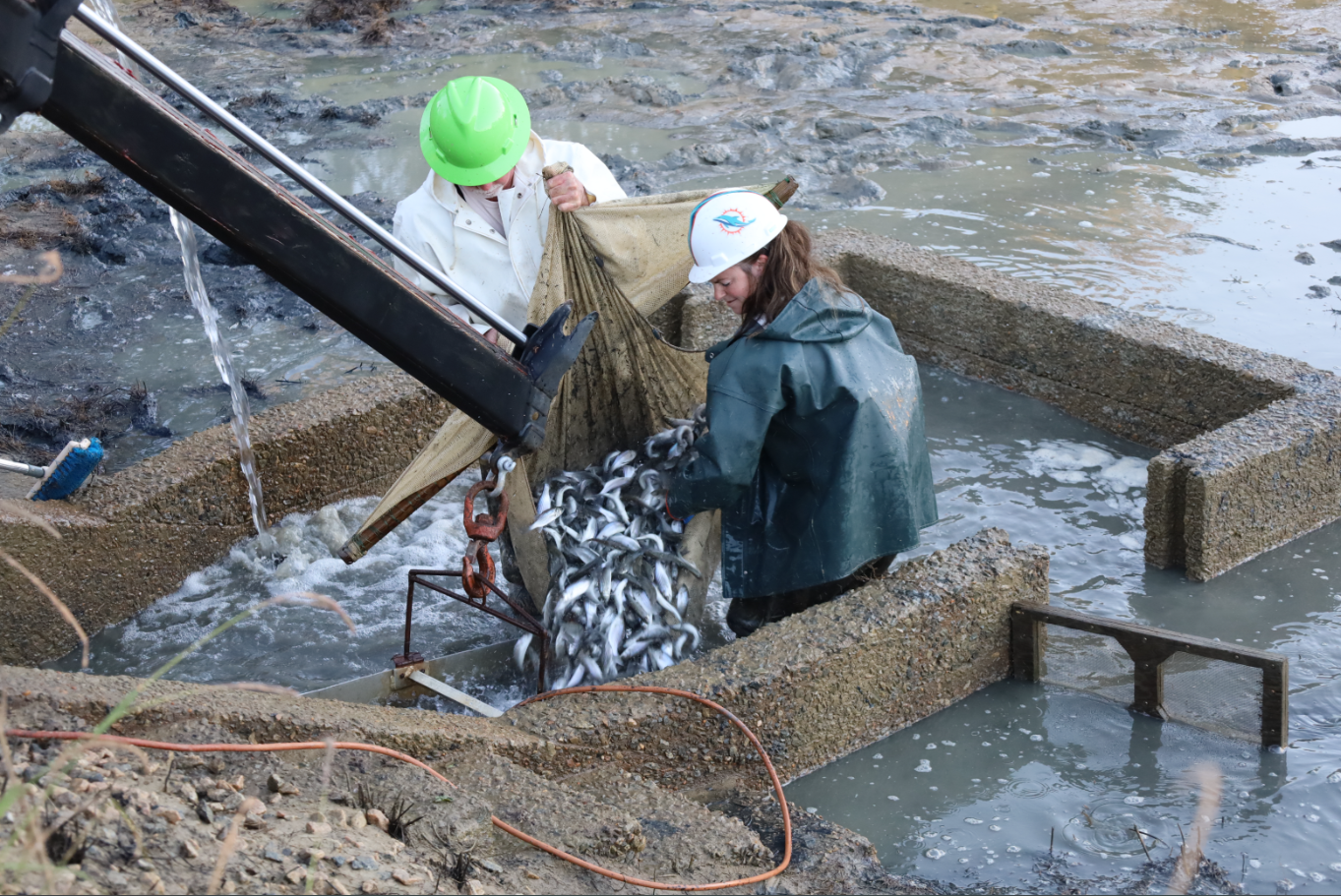
Biologists harvest striped bass in a pond kettle in a hatchery pond.

The Edenton National Fish Hatchery discontinued the rearing of fish for private ponds in 1974 to concentrate on striped bass production. Thereafter it distributed striped bass along the central United States East Coast, and its work included restoration of striped bass populations in the Hudson River in New York in 1974 and 1975, in the Chesapeake Bay in Maryland and Virginia between 1985 and 1994, and in the Navesink River in New Jersey in 1987 and 1988. The hatchery also began the production of other species, raising shortnose sturgeon (Acipenser brevirostrum) for stocking in the Savannah River between Georgia and South Carolina in 1989 and hatching American shad in 1994 for the first time since 1947, spawning 3.3 million American shad eggs.

In 2014, the hatchery began to stock rivers with lake sturgeon (Acipenser fulvescens) it raised. It subsequently began to raise johnny darters (Etheostoma nigrum) and Cape Fear shiners (Notropis mekistocholas), and in 2019 it succeeded in producing its first batch of white shiners (Luxilus albeolus). In 2020, it began to rear gopher frogs (Lithobates capito).

In 2021, the hatchery began the replacement of its pond kettles, concrete structures installed in the 1960s which aid staff in capturing fish in its fish ponds. The replacement project was expected to take several years to complete.

== Recreation ==
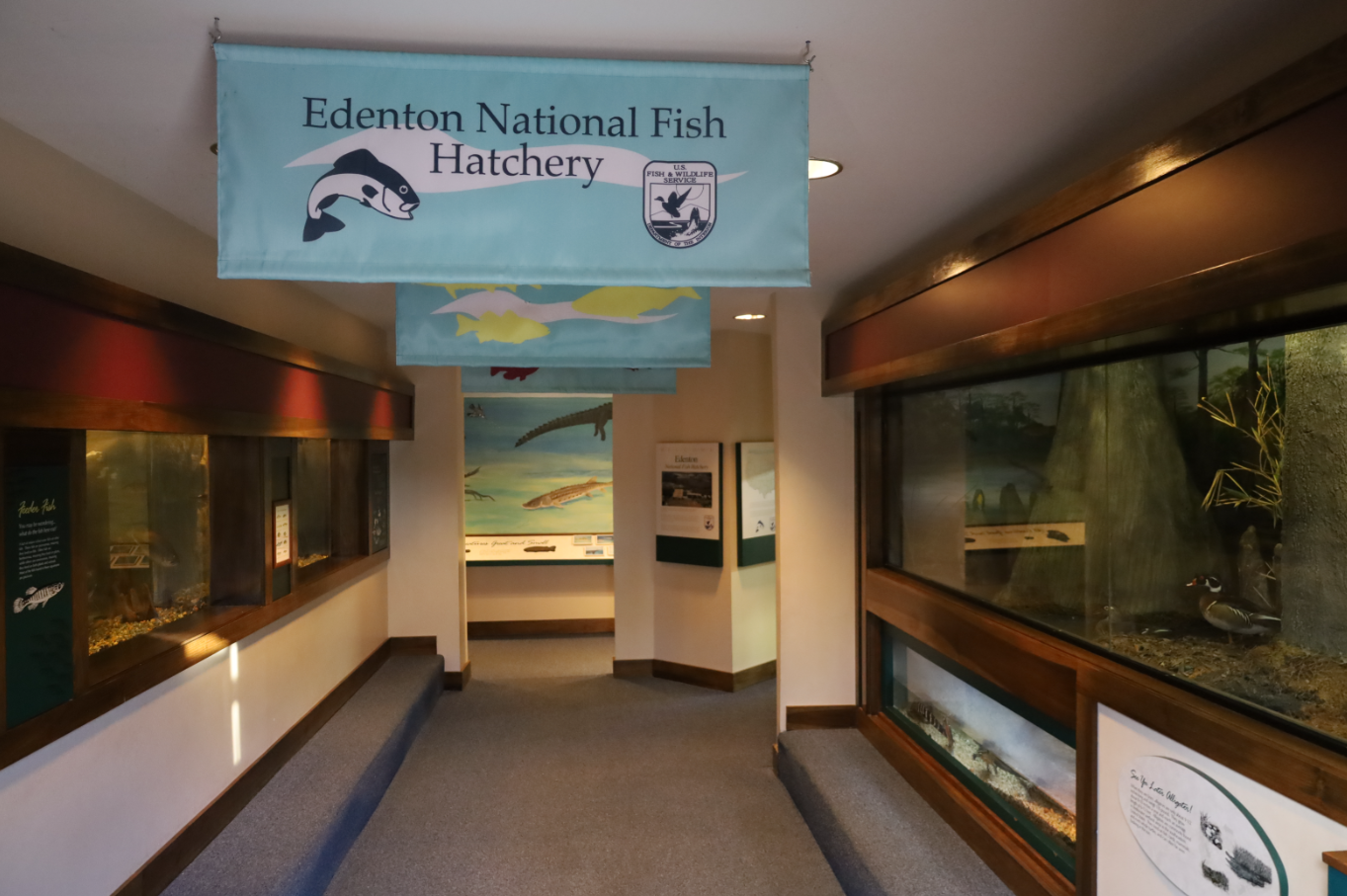
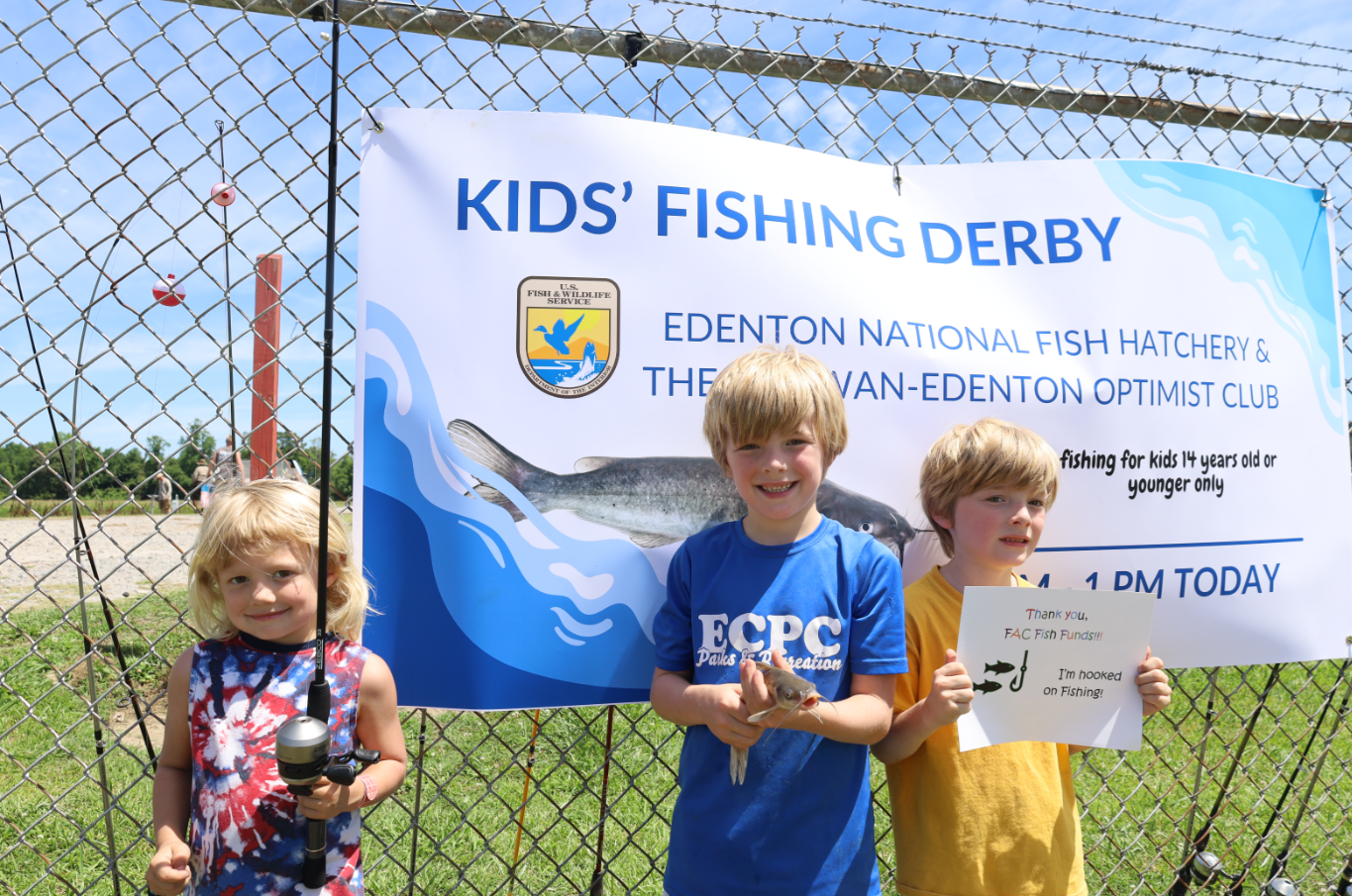
LEFT: The hatchery's public aquarium on December 3, 2021. RIGHT: Children at the hatchery's annual Kids' Fishing Derby on June 8, 2024.

The Edenton National Fish Hatchery's 70-acre (28-hectare) grounds offer visitors various educational and recreational opportunities. It is open year-round for self-guided tours by individuals and small groups and offers guided tours seasonally for larger groups by appointment. Visitors also can hike around the hatchery's 36 striped bass production ponds and along a trail to a 200-foot (61 m) boardwalk along Pembroke Creek.

The hatchery's public aquarium displays various species of fish as well as two resident American alligators (Alligator mississippiensis). In addition to the alligators, lake sturgeon, striped bass, and white shiners are on display at the aquarium year-round. Visitors can observe striped bass eggs and larval fish at the hatchery from mid-April to mid-May and juvenile striped bass in June and November. From June to September, the hatchery's holding house contains thousands of lake sturgeon, which children are allowed to hold. Johnny darters are at the holding house all year, and Cape Fear shiners are at the hatchery during the spring and summer. Gopher frogs can be seen at the hatchery from May to July.

== See also ==
- National Fish Hatchery System
- List of National Fish Hatcheries in the United States
