= Edenton Station, United States Fish and Fisheries Commission =

Historic district in North Carolina, United States

- U.S. National Register of Historic Places
- U.S. Historic district
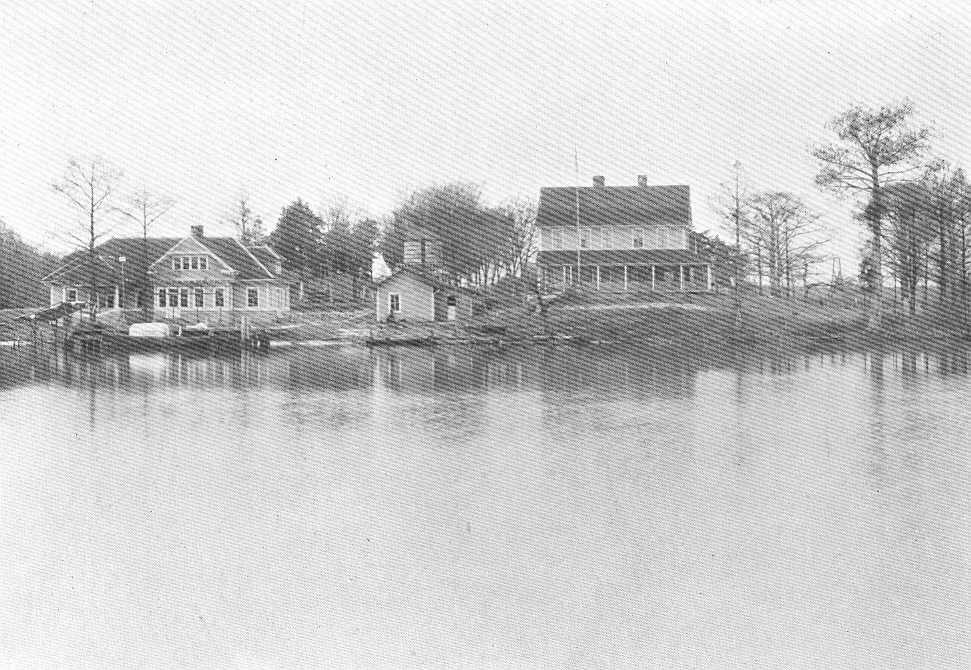
- Edenton Station in 1907.

- Location within North Carolina Location within the United States
- Location: 200 blk. Old Fish Hatchery Rd., Edenton, North Carolina
- Coordinates: 36°3′21″N 76°37′33″W
- Area: 15.1 acres (6.1 ha)
- Built: 1899
- Built by: U.S. Fish Commission (1899–1903); U.S. Bureau of Fisheries (Department of Commerce and Labor (1903–1913); U.S. Bureau of Fisheries Department of Commerce (1913–1940); Public Works Administration (1938–1940); Works Progress Administration (1938–1940)
- Architectural style: Colonial Revival; Bungalow/craftsman; Elevated water tank
- NRHP reference No.: 02000961
- Added to NRHP: September 14, 2002

Edenton Station, United States Fish and Fisheries Commission is a national historic district located in Edenton in Chowan County, North Carolina, in the United States. The district encompasses 17 contributing buildings, two contributing sites, 17 contributing structures, and two contributing objects.

The historic district is the former site of Edenton Station, a fish hatchery initially operated by the United States Commission of Fish and Fisheries (widely referred to as the United States Fish Commission) which began fish production in 1900. It was a component of the National Fish Hatchery System. The Fish Commission's successor, the Bureau of Fisheries, operated the hatchery from 1903 to 1940. During the 1930s, the Public Works Administration and Works Progress Administration funded a number of building projects at the hatchery. Notable contributing resources include the Superintendent's House (1900), Fish Culturist's House (1938-1939), terrace (1899-1900), Pump House No. 1 (1900, 1939), Pump House No. 2 (1924, 1939), Water Tank (1929), 10 Fish Ponds, Flag Pole (1922-1923), and Daphnia Pools (1939-1940). The hatchery was renamed the Edenton National Fish Hatchery in 1939.

In 1940, the Bureau of Fisheries merged with other agencies to form the Fish and Wildlife Service, the forerunner of the United States Fish and Wildlife Service. Due to the deteriorating condition of its fish ponds and an inability to expand on the site, the hatchery closed in 1954 and was abandoned. The Edenton National Fish Hatchery eventually reopened at a new and larger site 1 mile (1.6 km) to the west and resumed fish production in 1960.

The United States Government sold the hatchery's abandoned original site to private owners in 1961, and it later became a national historic district with the name "Edenton Station, United States Fish and Fisheries Commission." It was listed on the National Register of Historic Places in 2002.

== See also ==
- Edenton National Fish Hatchery
- National Fish Hatchery System
