= SS Edenton =

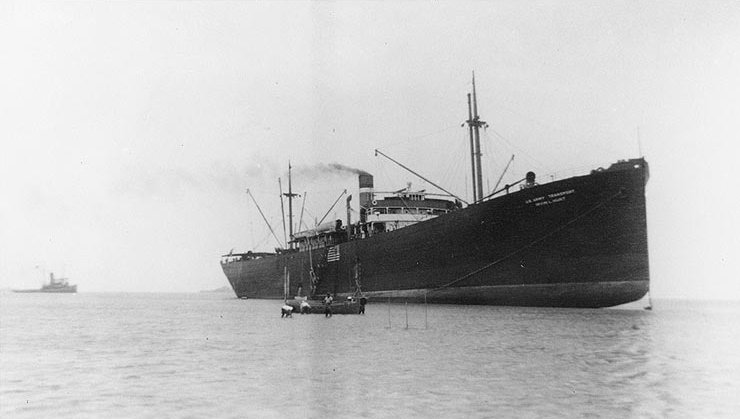
- USAT Irvin L. Hunt (formerly SS Edenton) stranded in the Makassar Strait, Dutch East Indies, 1941.

History
- Name: SS Edenton
- Namesake: Edenton, North Carolina
- Owner: U.S. Shipping Board
- Builder: Skinner & Eddy
- Laid down: 3 September 1918
- Launched: 9 November 1918
- Acquired: 5 December 1918
- Commissioned: 5 December 1918, – 12 May 1919
- In service: 5 December 1918–1946?
- Renamed: USS Edenton (ID-3696) 1918; Edenton 1919; USAT Irvin L. Hunt 1941; Edenton ~1946
- Reclassified: AK-38 (1941)
- Fate: Scrapped at Seattle, 1948

General characteristics
- Type: Design 1079 cargo ship
- Tonnage: 6,992 gross, 9,600 dwt
- Displacement: 13,627 tons
- Length: 423 ft 10 in (129.18 m); 409 ft (125 m) bp
- Beam: 54 ft (16 m)
- Draft: 26 ft 9 in (8.15 m)
- Installed power: 1 × 2,500 IHP steam turbine
- Propulsion: Single propeller
- Speed: 11.5 kn (21.3 km/h)
- Complement: USN: 70; Peacetime: 30; WWII: unknown

SS Edenton was a steel-hulled cargo ship built in 1918 for the United States Shipping Board as part of the Board's World War I emergency shipbuilding program.

Edenton briefly served in the U.S. Navy in the immediate postwar period as USS Edenton (ID-3696), participating in a famine relief mission to Eastern Europe before decommissioning in 1919. Between the wars, the ship was placed into commercial service as SS Edenton.

In early 1941, Edenton was acquired by the War Department for service with the U.S. Army. Considered for transfer to Navy as AK-38 but retained by the Army for use as a transport and renamed USAT Irvin L. Hunt. Irvin L. Hunt survived the war and after transfer to the Maritime Commission, was again renamed SS Edenton. The ship was scrapped in 1948.

== Construction and design ==
Edenton was built in Seattle, Washington in 1918 at the No. 1 Plant of the Skinner & Eddy Corporation—the first in a series of 23 Design 1079 cargo ships built by Skinner & Eddy under the USSB's emergency wartime shipbuilding program. The ship was laid down on 3 September, launched 52½ working (66 calendar) days later on 9 November, and delivered on 5 December—a total time under construction of just 70 working (92 calendar) days.

As all previous ships built by the company for the USSB had been of the Design 1013 type, the company decided to differentiate the new type by changing its naming system. The 1013s had all been prefixed with the word West, so for the 1079s the names were started with the letter "E" instead. The company was to stick with this nomenclature through the next fourteen ships, but dropped it for the fifteenth ship in the batch, Wheatland Montana, after which names appear to have been assigned randomly. Edenton herself was named after a city in North Carolina.

Edenton had a designed deadweight tonnage of 9,600 and a gross register tonnage of about 7,000 tons. The ship had a length of 423 feet 10 inches (409 feet between perpendiculars), a beam of 54 feet and a draft of 26 feet 9 inches. She was powered by a 2,500 IHP oil-fired steam turbine delivering a service speed of 11.5 to 12 knots.

== Service history ==
=== U.S. Navy service, 1918–1919 ===
Edenton was delivered to the Navy three weeks after the end of World War I on 5 December 1918. She was commissioned the same day at the Puget Sound Navy Yard as USS Edenton (ID-3696).

Edenton began her one and only Navy mission on 11 December 1918, when she sailed for the east coast of the U.S. with a cargo of flour bound for Eastern Europe on a postwar famine relief mission. Arriving at New York on 27 January 1919, Edenton departed on 19 February for Trieste, Italy where her cargo was duly delivered. She then returned to the United States, arriving at New Orleans, Louisiana on 4 May. The ship was decommissioned a few days later on 12 May and returned to control of the U.S. Shipping Board.

=== Interwar years ===
Following her decommission, Edenton was placed into merchant service by the USSB as SS Edenton. The ship appears to have ranged far and wide during this period of her career.

In the early 1920s, Edenton operated in both transatlantic and South American service, sailing between the United States and ports such as Rotterdam, the Netherlands and Havana, Cuba. On 29 March 1925, Edenton suffered a collision about 35 miles east of Barcelona, Spain with a French schooner, Ville de Bassens. The schooner was sunk in the accident, but apparently there were no deaths. Edenton suffered only minor damage.

By the late 1920s, the ship was in operation for the Roosevelt Line, sailing between U.S. ports such as New York and Los Angeles to various locations in the Pacific, including Honolulu, Hawaii; Manila, Philippines and the Far East. By 1930, Edenton was working for American Export Lines, making mail and parcel runs to Mediterranean and Near Eastern destinations such as Casablanca, Morocco; Piraeus, Greece; Constanța, Romania and Constantinople, Turkey.

The onset of the Great Depression in 1929–1930 substantially reduced international trade, and many mercantile vessels were laid up in this period due to lack of work. There is no record in readily available sources of Edenton's movements in the later 1930s, which indicates that she may have been one of those ships laid up.

=== World War II ===
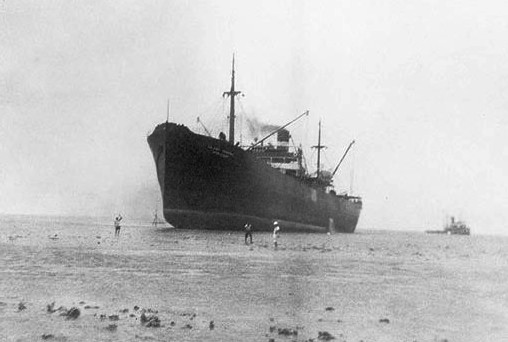
USAT Irvin L. Hunt stranded in the Makassar Strait in 1941. The ship was refloated and served through the end of the war.

In February 1941, Edenton was acquired from the U.S. Maritime Commission by the War Department. Initially earmarked for Navy service and assigned the hull number AK-38, she was instead retained by the Army for use as a transport, and renamed USAT Irvin L. Hunt servicing the San Francisco—Honolulu—Manila route.

During July 1941 the ship ran aground in the Makassar Strait, Netherlands East Indies. The ship remained in Army service for the duration of the war, during which time she saw service in the Pacific Theater. After the war, Irvin L. Hunt was retained by the Army until January 1947, when she was returned to the Maritime Commission as SS Edenton and placed in the reserve fleet at Astoria, Oregon. Edenton was scrapped by Dulien Steel Products of Seattle, Washington in 1948.

== Bibliography ==
- Clay, Steven E. (2011). U. S. Army Order Of Battle 1919-1941 (PDF). Volume 2. The Arms: Cavalry, Field Artillery, and Coast Artillery, 1919–41. Vol. 2. Fort Leavenworth, KS: Combat Studies Institute Press. ISBN 9780984190140. LCCN 2010022326. Archived from the original (PDF) on 16 September 2012.
- Pacific Ports Inc. (1919): Pacific Ports Annual, Fifth Edition, 1919, pp. 64–65, 402–405, Pacific Ports Inc.
- McKellar, Norman L. (1963): "Steel Shipbuilding under the U.S. Shipping Board, 1917–1921 – Design No. 1079, Skinner & Eddy Type", The Belgian Shiplover, pp. 325-326a, No. 94, July–August 1963.
- Joseph M. Radigan (2014). "USAT Irvin L. Hunt". NavSource.
- Naval History And Heritage Command. "Edenton". Dictionary of American Naval Fighting Ships. Naval History And Heritage Command. Archived from the original on 13 March 2004.
