= List of shipwrecks in January 1865 =

The list of shipwrecks in January 1865 includes ships sunk, foundered, grounded, or otherwise lost during January 1865.

== 1 January ==
List of shipwrecks: 1 January 1865
Ship	State	Description
Des Moines City	United States	The 122-ton sternwheel paddle steamer struck a snag and sank in the Arkansas River in Arkansas.
Margaret	United Kingdom	The lighter sank at Greenock, Renfrewshire. She was refloated on 11 January.
USS San Jacinto	United States Navy	The screw frigate struck a reef at No Name Cay off Great Abaco Island, the Bahamas and filled with water. Her crew were rescued. Efforts to salvage her failed.
Three Daisies	United Kingdom	The steamship was driven ashore and wrecked near Troon, Ayrshire. H≤er crew were rescued. She was on a voyage from Whitehaven, Cumberland to Hartlepool, County Durham, or Liverpool, Lancashire.
Waterloo	United Kingdom	The barque was driven ashore at South Shields, County Durham. She was on a voyage from Liverpool, Lancashire to South Shields. She was refloated and taken in to South Shields.
Zuma	United Kingdom	The ship struck a sunken rock off Jersey and was holed. She was taken in to Saint Helier the next day.

== 2 January ==
List of shipwrecks: 2 January 1865
Ship	State	Description
Andrew Wilson	United Kingdom	The schooner struck the Carr Rock, in the North Sea off the coast of Fife and was abandoned by her crew. She was later boarded by some fishermen and take in tow by the tug Hercules (United Kingdom) but sank at the mouth of the River Tay with the loss of one life.
Annie	(United Kingdom of Great Britain and Ireland) Guernsey	The ship struck rocks off Chausey, Manche, France. She was on a voyage from Newcastle upon Tyne, Northumberland to Granville, Manche. She was refloated the next day and taken in to Gorey, Jersey, Channel Islands in a severely leaky condition.
Celia	United Kingdom	American Civil War, Union blockade: The schooner, a blockade runner carrying a cargo of turpentine, was shelled, then boarded by a landing party from the gunboat USS Nipsic (United States Navy) and burned at Murrell's Inlet on the coast of South Carolina.
Cricket	United Kingdom	The sloop was driven ashore at St. Ubes, Portugal. She was on a voyage from Cork to Lisbon, Portugal.
Deerfoot	United Kingdom	The ship was crushed by ice and sunk at Narva, Russia. Her crew were rescued. She was on a voyage from Kronstadt, Russia to London.
Elizabeth	Russia	The brig was driven ashore near "Ostergarnsholm", Sweden. Her crew were rescued.
Idomeina	Italy	The barque struck the Whitby Rock. She was on a voyage from South Shields, County Durham, United Kingdom to Ancona, Papal States. She was towed in the River Tyne by the steamship Pilot (United Kingdom).
London	United Kingdom	The steamship departed from Gothenburg, Sweden for London. No further trace, presumed foundered with the loss of all hands.
Pourvoyeur	France	The lugger sank in the Atlantic Ocean (49°25′N 4°57′W). Her crew were rescued by the barque Herbert (United Kingdom). Purvoyeur was on a voyage from Bordeaux, Gironde to Gloucester, United Kingdom.
Rambler	United Kingdom	The sloop was abandoned in the Bristol Channel. Her three crew survived. She was driven ashore at Breaksea Point, Glamorgan. Rambler was on a voyage from Newport, Monmouthshire to Clonakilty, County Cork. She had become a wreck by 16 January.

== 3 January ==
List of shipwrecks: 3 January 1865
Ship	State	Description
Amphion	United Kingdom	The steamship was driven ashore at Sheringham, Norfolk. She was on a voyage from Sunderland, County Durham to London. She was refloated the next day.
Clayton	United Kingdom	The ship ran aground on the Goodwin Sands, Kent. She was on a voyage from Havre de Grâce, Seine-Inférieure, France to South Shields, County Durham. She was refloated and put in to Ramsgate, Kent.
John Bull	United Kingdom	The barque foundered 3 nautical miles (5.6 km) off the mouth of the Rio Grande with the loss of two of her crew.
Lady Milton	United Kingdom	The ship departed from the "Waux River" for Queenstown, County Cork. No further trace, presumed foundered with the loss of all hands.
Pasha	United Kingdom	The ship was driven ashore and wrecked at Peterhead, Aberdeenshire. Her crew were rescued.
Plantaganet	United Kingdom	The brig was wrecked on the Portsal Rocks, off the coast of Finistère, France. Her crew were rescued. She was on a voyage from Sunderland, County Durham to Bordeaux, Gironde, France.
Stevens	United Kingdom	The sloop was beached at East Wemyss, Fife. Her crew were rescued. She was on a voyage from Methil, Fife to Bo'ness, Lothian.
Surprise	(United Kingdom of Great Britain and Ireland) New Zealand	The schooner became stranded on a sandspit at the mouth of the Whanganui River while carrying goods from Manukau.
Wright	United States	The steamship ran aground and was wrecked at Greytown, Nicaragua.

== 4 January ==
List of shipwrecks: 4 January 1865
Ship	State	Description
Amphion	United Kingdom	The ship was driven ashore at Sheringham, Norfolk.
Anhambaí	Imperial Brazilian Navy	Paraguayan War: The gunboat ran aground at Corumbá and was captured by the Paraguayans.
Ann Perry	United States	Carrying a cargo of lumber and potatoes, the 348-ton bark ran aground on the coast of California a few miles south of Cliff House with the loss of three lives.
HMS Cadmus	Royal Navy	The Pearl-class corvette ran aground at Chatham, Kent. She was refloated.
Iona	United Kingdom	The schooner capsized in the Atlantic Ocean with the loss of two of her six crew. Survivors were rescued by the schooner Judah Cappe (Netherlands). Iona was on a voyage from Portland, Maine, United States to Puerto Rico.
Knickerbocker	United States	The 858-ton sidewheel paddle steamer ran aground on the coast of Virginia in the Chesapeake Bay between Fleet's Point and Smith's Point. She was still aground on 15 February when she was captured and burned by Confederate forces.
Rattlesnake	United Kingdom	American Civil War, Union blockade: While trying to run the Union blockade and enter Charleston Harbor at Charleston, South Carolina, the 529-gross register ton screw steamer was forced aground on the coast of South Carolina just east of Breach Inlet by the armed schooner USS Potomska and the gunboat USS Wamsutta (both United States Navy). She was burned and abandoned.
Sceptre	(United Kingdom of Great Britain and Ireland) British North America	The schooner foundered off Padre Island, Texas, Confederate States of America.
Vesper	United Kingdom	The fishing smack foundered. Her crew were rescued by the brig Tyne (United Kingdom).

== 5 January ==
List of shipwrecks: 5 January 1865
Ship	State	Description
Calliance	United Kingdom	The full-rigged ship was driven onto a reef and wrecked at Camden Harbour, Western Australia.
Camilla	United Kingdom	The ship ran aground at Nassau, Bahamas. She was on a voyage from Newport, Monmouthshire to Nassau. She was refloated on 7 January.
Canterbury	(United Kingdom of Great Britain and Ireland) New Zealand	The ship was driven ashore in Palliser Bay. She had been refloated and repaired by 15 July.
Christian	United Kingdom	The schooner departed from North Shields, Northumberland for Perth. No further trace, presumed foundered with the loss of all four crew.
Contest	United Kingdom	The ship struck the Haisborough Sands, in the North Sea off the coast of Norfolk and sank. Her crew were rescued. She was on a voyage from São Miguel Island, Azores to Hull, Yorkshire.
Elizabeth	United Kingdom	The schooner was wrecked on the Burbo Bank, in Liverpool Bay with the loss of all hands. She was on a voyage from Dublin to Liverpool, Lancashire.
Lloyd's	United Kingdom	The ship departed from a French port for Portsmouth, Hampshire. No further trace, presumed foundered with the loss of all hands.
Lochee	United Kingdom	The full-rigged ship was destroyed by fire 20 nautical miles (37 km) off Point de Galle, Ceylon with the loss of two of the 45 people on board. Survivors were rescued by the brigantine Soon Hong (Hamburg). Lochee was on a voyage from Dundee, Forfarshire to Calcutta, India.
Lord Adolphus	United Kingdom	The schooner sprang a leak and foundered in the North Sea with the loss of a crew member. Survivors were rescued by a Norwegian vessel.
Loochee	United Kingdom	The ship was destroyed by fire off Galle, Ceylon with the loss of two lives. She was on a voyage from Dundee, Forfarshire to Calcutta, India.
Orontes	United Kingdom	The ship was sighted off Gibraltar whilst on a voyage from Odesa, Russia to a British port. No further trace, presumed foundered with the loss of all hands.
Pleiades	United Kingdom	The full-rigged ship was driven onto the Devil's Bank, in the River Mersey. She was on a voyage from Liverpool to Callao, Peru. She was refloated with the assistance of three tugs.
Robert McWilliams	United Kingdom	The brig was driven ashore on Skagen, Denmark. Four crew were reported missing, the rest were rescued by a lifeboat. She was on a voyage from Vyborg, Grand Duchy of Finland to London. She subsequently became a wreck.
Wilken	United Kingdom	The ship departed from Speymouth, Moray for Sunderland, County Durham. No further trace, presumed foundered with the loss of all hands.

== 6 January ==
List of shipwrecks: 6 January 1865
Ship	State	Description
Betsey	United Kingdom	The ship sank at Bernard's Wharf. Her crew were rescued. She was on a voyage from "Port Dundrum" to Fleetwood, Lancashire.
Canton	Hamburg	The schooner was lost in the South China Sea with the loss of all but one of her crew and 549 of the 550 coolies on board. She was on a voyage from Swatow, China to Singapore, Straits Settlements.
Edwards	United Kingdom	The schooner was driven ashore and wrecked at Mazagan, Morocco.
Piedmont	United States	The 448-ton screw steamer was destroyed by fire 6 nautical miles (11 km) off the Cape Elizabeth Lights, Maine with the loss of four of her crew. She was on a voyage from Portland, Maine to New York City.
Salclodin	Portugal	The schooner-rigged steamship was wrecked on the Burbo Bank, in Liverpool Bay.
Sydenham	United Kingdom	The ship was wrecked at Bombay, India. Her crew were rescued. She was on a voyage from Kurrachee to Bombay.

== 7 January ==
List of shipwrecks: 7 January 1865
Ship	State	Description
Apollo	United Kingdom	The schooner was driven ashore at Great Yarmouth, Norfolk. She was on a voyage from North Shields, Northumberland to the River Thames.
Jeune Sophie	France	The ship ran aground on the Bœufs. She was declared a total loss.
John and Jane	United Kingdom	The ship was wrecked on the North Garr Sand, at the mouth of the River Tees with the loss of both crew. She was on a voyage from Middlesbrough, Yorkshire to Newcastle upon Tyne, Northumberland.
Marie	Norway	The brig was abandoned in the North Sea. Her crew were rescued by the steamship Leopard (Hamburg).
Waterwitch	United Kingdom	The smack was abandoned in the Dogger Bank with the loss of a crew member.

== 8 January ==
List of shipwrecks: 8 January 1865
Ship	State	Description
Kassine	Flag unknown	The ship was driven ashore and wrecked on "Ludroog", one of the Wadden Islands.
Melville	United States	The steamship foundered with the loss of about 80 lives. She was on a voyage from New York City to Hilton Head Island, South Carolina, Confederate States of America.
Valeria	United Kingdom	The ship was wrecked on "Kadour Island", in the Sea of Marmara. She was on a voyage from Malta to Constantinople, Ottoman Empire.

== 9 January ==
List of shipwrecks: 9 January 1865
Ship	State	Description
George and Emily	United Kingdom	The barque ran aground on the Cross Sand, in the North Sea off the coast of Norfolk. She was on a voyage from North Shields, Northumberland to Alexandria, Egypt. She was refloated and put back to North Shields in a leaky condition.

== 10 January ==
List of shipwrecks: 10 January 1865
Ship	State	Description
HMS Aurora	Royal Navy	The Imperieuse-class frigate was driven ashore near Cherbourg, Seine-Inférieure, France.
Bridgwater	United Kingdom	The ship was driven ashore at Sandy Hook, New Jersey, United States.
Diligent	United States	The 140-ton sidewheel paddle steamer struck a snag and sank in the Mississippi River upstream from Helena, Arkansas.
Hoffnung	Flag unknown	The ship ran aground on the Newcombe Sand, in the North Sea of the coast of Suffolk, United Kingdom. She was on a voyage from Newcastle upon Tyne, Northumberland, United Kingdom to Seville, Spain. She was refloated the next day and taken in to Lowestoft, Suffolk.
Lady Shelburne	United Kingdom	The brig foundered off Filfla, Malta. Her crew survived. She was on a voyage from Brăila, Ottoman Empire to a British port.
Mary	United Kingdom	The brig was driven ashore at Buenos Aires, Argentina. She was refloated on 18 January.

== 11 January ==
List of shipwrecks: 11 January 1865
Ship	State	Description
Friends	United Kingdom	The sloop ran aground and sank at Eyemouth, Berwickshire.
Happy Family	United Kingdom	The brig was driven ashore at Lowestoft, Suffolk.
Regina	United Kingdom	The steamship was run down and sunk off Southend-on-Sea, Essex by the steamship Carbon (United Kingdom). Her crew survived. Regina was on a voyage from the Mediterranean to London.

== 12 January ==
List of shipwrecks: 12 January 1865
Ship	State	Description
CSS Columbia	Confederate States Navy	American Civil War: The ironclad ram struck rocks or a sunken wreck, grounded, and broke her back at Charleston, South Carolina, near Fort Moultrie. Confederate efforts to refloat her failed. Union forces captured her on 18 February and refloated her on 26 April.
Geelong	United Kingdom	The ship struck a sunken wreck at Buenos Aires, Argentina and was beached. She was on a voyage from Buenos Aires to Batavia, Netherlands East Indies. She was declared a total loss.
Jefferson Davis	United States	The ship foundered in the Atlantic Ocean with the loss of six of her 28 crew. Survivors were rescued by Chattillon (United Kingdom).
Pauline	United Kingdom	The ship ran aground on the Shipwash Sand, in the North Sea off the coast of Suffolk. She was on a voyage from South Shields, County Durham to Porto, Portugal. She floated off and sank with the loss of a crew member.
Rapid	(United Kingdom of Great Britain and Ireland) British North America	The ship was driven ashore in the Gut of Canso. She was on a voyage from Pugwash, Nova Scotia to a British port. She was refloated and resumed her voyage.
Thomas	United Kingdom	The schooner struck rocks in the Farne Islands, Northumberland and was damaged. She was on a voyage from Arbroath, Forfarshire to the River Tyne. She put in to Warkworth, Northumberland in a leaky condition.
Wasp	United States	During a voyage in California from Freeport to San Francisco with a cargo of brick and cobble, the sloop struck a snag and sank in Steamboat Slough.

== 13 January ==
List of shipwrecks: 13 January 1865
Ship	State	Description
Billy	United Kingdom	The brig was wrecked off Southwold, Suffolk, England, with the loss of all six crew.
Brazilie Packet	Grand Duchy of Oldenburg	The brig parted her cables when anchored near the Brisons, off Cornwall, United Kingdom and went on the rocks at Progo Cove, Cape Cornwall. Her crew were either lost, or rescued by Mercutio Santos (Flag unknown). She was on her way from the Rio Grande to Falmouth, Cornwall carrying hides and horns.
Charlotte	United Kingdom	The ship was driven ashore and wrecked on the Isle of May, Fife. Her crew were rescued. She was on a voyage from Crail, Fife to Newcastle upon Tyne, Northumberland.
Christiana	United Kingdom	The schooner was driven into the barque Florence Bragington (United Kingdom) and sank at Plymouth, Devon. She was on a voyage from Morwellham Quay, Devon to Swansea, Glamorgan.
Effort	United Kingdom	The schooner collided with Ocean Bride (United Kingdom) and sank off Orfordness, Suffolk. Her crew were rescued. She was on a voyage from South Shields, County Durham to London.
Henrietta	United Kingdom	The sloop hit Barrel Point while attempting to cross Hayle Bar, in St Ives Bay, Cornwall, England, with the loss of all three crew and the pilot.
Ilma	Russia	The barque was driven ashore and wrecked at Merlimont, Pas-de-Calais, France with the loss of nine of her eleven crew. She was on a voyage from Antwerp, Belgium to Almería, Spain.
Powerful	United Kingdom	The East Indiaman foundered off Guernsey, Channel Islands with the loss of all hands. She was on a voyage from Calcutta, India to London.
Premier	United Kingdom	The barque was driven ashore and wrecked in White Bay, County Cork. She was on a voyage from Iquique, Chile to Newcastle upon Tyne, Northumberland. She was refloated on 28 January and towed in to Queenstown, County Cork.
Providential	United Kingdom	The ship ran aground on the Herd Sand, in the North Sea off the coast of County Durham. She was on a voyage from Dieppe, Seine-Inférieure, France to North Shields, Northumberland. She was refloated the next day and taken in to North Shields.
Westmoreland	United Kingdom	The ship ran aground on the Longnose Rock, off Kingsgate, Kent. She was on a voyage from Grimsby, Lincolnshire to Havre de Grâce, Seine-Inférieure. She was refloated on 15 January and taken in to Ramsgate, Kent.
Young America	United States	The 179- or 350-ton sidewheel paddle steamer struck a snag, broke in two, and sank in the Feather River 8 miles (13 km) below Marysville, California.

== 14 January ==
List of shipwrecks: 14 January 1865
Ship	State	Description
Amélie	France	The sloop was wrecked near Fécamp, Seine-Inférieure. Her crew were rescued by the steam cutter Averne (France).
Argo	United Kingdom	The ship was driven ashore and wrecked at Maltreath, Anglesey. She was on a voyage from Liverpool, Lancashire to Cette, Hérault, France.
Artillery	United Kingdom	The horse boat sank at Plymouth, Devon.
Azua	France	The barque was wrecked at Saint Thomas, Virgin Islands. She was on a voyage from Cartagena, United States of Colombia to Gonaïves, Haiti.
Ceres	United Kingdom	While carrying roof slate to Hayle, Cornwall, England, the brigantine broke her moorings while in Boscastle, Cornwall, and ran up the beach during hurricane-force winds. She was badly damaged on the next tide and became a wreck. Her crew survived.
Champion	United Kingdom	The barque foundered off Haiti. Her crew were rescued. She was on a voyage from Saint-Marc, Haiti to Falmouth, Cornwall.
Cygnet	United Kingdom	The ship was driven out to sea crewless from Exmouth, Devon. She came ashore at Platte Saline Bay, Alderney, Channel Islands and was wrecked.
Elgin	United Kingdom	The full-rigged ship was driven ashore at Plymouth.
Elizabeth Jane	United Kingdom	The schooner parted her moorings and was driven out of Newquay harbour and onto Towan Beach, north Cornwall, England.
Fear Not	United Kingdom	The ship was lost in the South China Sea.
Fœderis Arca	Flag unknown	The schooner was driven ashore at Swansea, Glamorgan, United Kingdom.
Frieden	Norway	The ship was wrecked on Île Melon, in the Glénan Islands, Finistère, France with the loss of three of her eight crew.
Gabrielle	France	The galiot was driven ashore on Île Melon. Her crew survived. She was on a voyage from an English port to Bordeaux, Gironde.
HMS Geyser	Royal Navy	The Driver-class sloop was driven against the quayside at Plymouth.
Henry Holman	United Kingdom	The schooner was run ashore at Penmanarch, Anglesey. Her eight crew were rescued. A crew member of the Holyhead Lifeboat was lost going to her assistance. Henry Holman was on a voyage from Liverpool to Bermuda.
Hero	United Kingdom	The ship struck the Brake Sand. She was on a voyage from Newcastle upon Tyne, Northumberland to Boulogne, Pas-de-Calais, France. She put in to Ramsgate, Kent in a leaky condition.
Jane	United Kingdom	The schooner was driven ashore at Mablethorpe, Lincolnshire. She was on a voyage from Marseille, Bouches-du-Rhône, France to King's Lynn, Norfolk.
Lelia	United Kingdom	American Civil War, Union blockade: The 640-gross registered ton sidewheel paddle steamer sprang a leak and sank in heavy seas in Liverpool Bay off the Great Orme, Caernarfonshire, near the North West lightship ( Trinity House) was on a voyage from Liverpool, Lancashire to Nassau, Bahamas or Bermuda. 46 lives were lost, the 12 survivors reaching the lightship. They could only be taken to safety two days later.
Lizzie	United Kingdom	The schooner sank off the coast of Finistère with the loss of all hands.
Ocean	United Kingdom	The schooner sank off Langstone, Hampshire with the loss of two of her five crew. Survivors were rescued by a cutter from Fort Cumberland. She was on a voyage from Charlestown, Cornwall to Sunderland, County Durham.
Prince Imperial	United Kingdom	The ship was driven ashore in Saint Ouens Bay, Jersey, Channel Islands. She was on a voyage from Havre de Grâce, Seine-Inférieure, France to Cardiff, Glamorgan. She was declared a total loss, but was refloated on 29 January and towed in to Saint Helier by the steamships Ariel and Fuon (Both France).
Rambler	United Kingdom	The smack collided with a Dutch schooner and another vessel off Portishead, Somerset and capsized. She came ashore at Clevedon, Somerset and was wrecked. She was on a voyage from Gloucester to Savannah, Georgia, Confederate States of America. f
Samuel	United Kingdom	The ship was abendoned in the English Channel off Beachy Head, Sussex. She was on a voyage from Exmouth, Devon to Hartlepool, County Durham.
Snipe	United Kingdom	The brig ran aground on the Shipwash Sand, in the North Sea off the coast of Suffolk and sank. Her crew were rescued by Jane Howard (United Kingdom).
Swansea	United Kingdom	The ship was driven ashore and wrecked in Ballydonaghan Bay.
HMS Terrible	Royal Navy	The frigate ran aground at Sheerness, Kent.
Thomas	United Kingdom	The schooner was wrecked on the Dogger Bank, in the Irish Sea. All six people on board were rescued by the Rosslare Lifeboat.
True Blue	United Kingdom	The brig was wrecked at "Chatillon", near Boulogne, Pas-de-Calais, France with the loss of seven of her nine crew. She was on a voyage from Monastagem, Algeria to London.

== 15 January ==
List of shipwrecks: 15 January 1865
Ship	State	Description
Askalon	United Kingdom	The steamship was abandoned in the Atlantic Ocean (46°58′N 25°03′W). All on board were rescued by the barque Almonde (Denmark). Askalon was on a voyage from Liverpool, Lancashire to Port-au-Prince, Haiti.
Cygnet	United Kingdom	The ship was driven ashore and wrecked on Alderney, Channel Islands.
Ellen Sophia	United Kingdom	The brig struck rocks and sank off Dingle Head, County Cork with the loss of all hands. She was on a voyage from Demerara, British Guiana to Liverpool, Lancashire.
Juanito	Spain	The brig lost her way while carrying sugar and molasses from Cárdenas, Cuba to Greenock, Scotland, and struck the rocks at Duckpool, Cornwall, United Kingdom with the loss of one of her eleven crew. Survivors were rescued by rocket apparatus.
Liverpool No. 1 Lifeboat	United Kingdom	Illustration of the capsizing of the Liverpool No. 1 Lifeboat on its way to rescue the crew of Lelia, from the Illustrated London News. The lifeboat capsized in heavy seas in Liverpool Bay en route for the North West lightship (United Kingdom) in tow of the tug Blazer (United Kingdom) to recover the survivors of the sinking of the paddle steamer Lelia (United Kingdom) the previous day. Seven of the lifeboat's eleven crew members drowned, the survivors being rescued by the tug.
Lotus	United States	Bound from New York City to Port Royal, South Carolina, carrying a shipment by the Adams Express Company, a cargo of sutler's stores, four passengers, and a crew of five, the schooner ran ashore on the coast of South Carolina at North Shore Beach near Winyah Bay. While the sidewheel gunboat USS Sebago (United States Navy) was trying to help refloat her, Lotus was driven farther onto the beach, stranding her.
North Heath	United Kingdom	American Civil War: The 541-gross register ton sidewheel paddle steamer, damaged while entering port at Wilmington, North Carolina, in October 1864, was scuttled as a blockship in North Carolina's Cape Fear River near either Fort Lee or Fort Strong.
USS Patapsco	United States Navy	American Civil War: The monitor struck a mine at Charleston, South Carolina, and sank with the loss of 62 lives almost 800 yards (732 meters) east of Fort Sumter at 32.765252°N 79.891281°W.
Rosine	United Kingdom	The ship departed from Vigo, Spain for Sunderland, County Durham. No further trace, presumed foundered with the loss of all hands.
Wilmington	Confederate States of America	American Civil War: The incomplete ironclad was burned prior to launching at Wilmington, North Carolina, to prevent her capture by Union forces.

== 16 January ==
List of shipwrecks: 16 January 1865
Ship	State	Description
Albert Jurss	Russia	The ship was damaged by fire in De Castries Bay. She was subsequently repaired.
Colieton	United Kingdom	The ship was driven ashore at Brielle, South Holland, Netherlands. She was refloated on 21 January with the assistance of a tug.
Euphemia Anderson	United Kingdom	The ship was wrecked at Capbreton, Landes, France with the loss of all but three of her crew.
Ganges	United Kingdom	The brig was abandoned in the Atlantic Ocean. Her crew were rescued by Sacramento (United States). Ganges was on a voyage from Cádiz, Spain to Boston, Massachusetts, United States.
Napoleon	United Kingdom	The schooner ran aground on the Herd Sand, in the North Sea off the coast of County Durham. She was on a voyage from Antwerp, Belgium to North Shields, Northumberland. She was refloated the next day.
Welcome Hill	United Kingdom	The ship was driven ashore on Walney Island, Lancashire. She was on a voyage from Liverpool, Lancashire to Newry, County Antrim.

== 17 January ==
List of shipwrecks: 17 January 1865
Ship	State	Description
America	United Kingdom	The brig was abandoned in the North Sea off Ostend, West Flanders, Belgium. Her crew were rescued by a steamship.
Beatrice	United Kingdom	The steamship foundered in the Bay of Biscay. Her crew were rescued by the barque Jean Bart (France). Beatrice was on a voyage from Cardiff, Glamorgan to Bordeaux, Gironde, France.
Cape Fear	Confederate States of America	American Civil War: Confederate forces scuttled the screw transport in the Cape Fear River near Smithfield, North Carolina, to prevent her capture by Union forces.
Chippewa	United States	American Civil War: The steamer grounded on the south shore of the Arkansas River at Ivey's Ford, 14 miles (22.5 km) above Clarksville, Arkansas. Confederate forces captured her and her crew and passengers, removed her cargo, and burned her.
Clarence	United Kingdom	The ship sprang a leak and sank off The Skerries, off the coast of Anglesey. Her crew were rescued. She was on a voyage from Ardrossan, Ayrshire to Dublin.
Columbian	United Kingdom	The 1,100-ton West India and Pacific Steamship Company iron screw steamer was blown onto rocks and wrecked by a hurricane off Ouessant, Finistère, France with the loss of 31 of the 34 people on board. She was on a voyage from Liverpool, Lancashire to the West Indies.
Crusader	United Kingdom	The steamship ran aground at Port-au-Prince, Haiti. She was on a voyage from Port-au-Prince to Liverpool. She was refloated.
Edith	United Kingdom	The ship was driven ashore and damaged at Ballyferris, County Down. She was on a voyage from the Clyde to Padstow, Cornwall. She was refloated and taken in to Donaghadee.
Justus	Netherlands	The ship was driven ashore in the Wester Ems. She was on a voyage from an English port to Groningen. She was refloated on 21 January and taken in to Emden, Kingdom of Hanover.
Pelteway	Confederate States of America	American Civil War: Confederate forces scuttled the steamer in the Cape Fear River at Smithfield, to prevent her capture by Union forces.
Sir John Franklin	United Kingdom	During a voyage from Baltimore, Maryland, to San Francisco, California, with a cargo of lumber, dry goods, pianos, and distilled spirits, the 999-ton full-rigged ship hit rocks on the coast of California halfway between Pigeon Point and Point Año Nuevo and sank with the loss of 13 lives. There were three survivors.
Steadfast	United Kingdom	The ship was driven ashore at Mostaganem, Algeria.
Suzanne	United Kingdom	The ship was abandoned in the Atlantic Ocean (47°29′N 51°33′W). Her fourteen crew were rescued by the barque Olrikken (Norway). Suzanne was on a voyage from Cartagena, Spain to South Shields, County Durham.
Wanderer	United Kingdom	The ship ran aground on the Shipwash Sand, in the North Sea off the coast of Suffolk. She was refloated with the assistance of two smack and resumed her voyage.

== 18 January ==
List of shipwrecks: 18 January 1865
Ship	State	Description
Calliope	Norway	The barque sprang a leak and was abandoned in the Atlantic Ocean. Her crew were rescued. She was on a voyage from Odesa, Russia to Falmouth, Cornwall, United Kingdom.
Lavinia	Confederate States of America	The steamship caught fire at Havana, Cuba and may have been scuttled.
Margaret	United Kingdom	The ship was wrecked 3 nautical miles (5.6 km) south of Girvan, Renfrewshire. Her crew were rescued She was on a voyage from Ardrossan, Ayrshire to Runcorn, Cheshire.
Margaret	United Kingdom	The ship was wrecked at Cosswell Point, County Antrim with the loss of all hands.
Rangoon	United Kingdom	The steamship suffered an onboard explosion and fire with the loss of two lives. She was on a voyage from Bombay, India to Suez, Egypt.
Reaper	United Kingdom	The ship ran aground on the Longsand, in the North Sea off the coast of Essex. She was on a voyage from South Shields, County Durham to "Vienna". She was refloated and resumed her voyage.
Sonderberg	Trieste	The barque ran aground on the Cannon Rock. She was on a voyage from Troon, Ayrshire, United Kingdom to Odesa, Russia. She was refloated the next day and was assisted in to Belfast, County Antrim, United Kingdom.
Thomas and Margaret	United Kingdom	The brig was run down and sunk off Sheerness, Kent by Lady Berridale (United Kingdom) with the loss of one of her six crew.

== 19 January ==
List of shipwrecks: 19 January 1865
Ship	State	Description
Annie Scott	United Kingdom	The ship was severely damaged at Constantinople, Ottoman Empire when an Ottoman transport ship was driven into her during a gale.
Countess of Malmesbury	United Kingdom	The ship foundered in the English Channel 8 nautical miles (15 km) off St. Alban's Head, Dorset. Her crew were rescued. She was on a voyage from Rochester, Kent to Brest, Finistère, France.
Sardina	United Kingdom	The ship was driven ashore at "Locknoll Point", Wigtownshire.
Windsor	United Kingdom	The sloop was driven ashore and wrecked at "Pontasnal", Finistère, France.

== 20 January ==
List of shipwrecks: 20 January 1865
Ship	State	Description
Darien	United Kingdom	The steamship ran aground on Taylor's Bank, in Liverpool Bay. She was on a voyage from Bermuda to Liverpool, Lancashire. She was refloated and taken in to Liverpool.
John Randolph	Confederate States of America	The transport was wrecked on Sullivan's Island at the entrance to Charleston Harbor off Charleston, South Carolina.
Louisa Ann	United Kingdom	The ship struck a sunken rock off Portland Bill, Dorset. She was on a voyage from Poole, Dorset to Runcorn, Cheshire. She put in to Weymouth, Dorset in a leaky condition.
Marmora	United Kingdom	The barque ran aground on the Shipwash Sand, in the North Sea off the coast of Suffolk. She was on a voyage from London to Dundee, Forfarshire. She was refloated with the assistance of two smacks and resumed her voyage.
Wilhelmina Egberdina	Netherlands	The ship sprang a leak and sank in the English Channel 6 nautical miles (11 km) south of Brighton, Sussex, United Kingdom. Her crew were rescued. She was on a voyage from Galaţi, Ottoman Empire to Amsterdam, North Holland.

== 21 January ==
List of shipwrecks: 21 January 1865
Ship	State	Description
Brancepath	United Kingdom	The steamship ran aground 2 nautical miles (3.7 km) north of Bridlington, Yorkshire. She was refloated and resumed her voyage.
Granite City	Confederate States of America	American Civil War, Union blockade: The steamer, a blockade runner perhaps renamed Three Marys, was chased ashore off Velasco, Texas, by the screw steamer USS Penguin (United States Navy) and broke up.
James	United Kingdom	The schooner was driven ashore at Ballyferris, County Down. She was on a voyage from Troon, Ayrshire to Dublin. She was refloated.
Liseon	(United Kingdom of Great Britain and Ireland) British North America	The schooner was driven ashore at Campobello, New Brunswick. She was on a voyage from Windsor, Nova Scotia to New York City. She was later refloated.
HMS Lyra	Royal Navy	The Swallow-class sloop was driven ashore. She was refloated, repaired and returned to service.
Surprise	United Kingdom	The tug collided with the steamship Sofia (United Kingdom) and sank in the River Mersey. Her crew were rescued.
Unnamed	United Kingdom	The full-rigged ship foundered in the Atlantic Ocean (36°18′N 46°10′W) with the loss of all hands.

== 22 January ==
List of shipwrecks: 22 January 1865
Ship	State	Description
Delphina	Confederate States of America	American Civil War, Union blockade: Carrying a cargo of cotton, the schooner was forced aground and destroyed on the Calcasieu River near Calcasieu Pass in Louisiana by a cutter and a launch from the gunboat USS Chocura (United States Navy).
Glenara	United Kingdom	The barque departed from Alexandria, Egypt for Hull, Yorkshire. Believed subsequently driven ashore on the coast of Africa and plundered by the local inhabitants before floating off. She was towed in to Malta by HMS Magicienne (Royal Navy) in early March.

== 23 January ==
List of shipwrecks: 23 January 1865
Ship	State	Description
CSS Drewry	Confederate States Navy	The wreck of a Confederate gunboat on the James River in 1865, believed to be that of CSS Drewry. American Civil War, Battle of Trent's Reach: The gunboat ran aground on the James River in Virginia 400 yards (366 meters) downriver from obstructions at Trent's Reach and 1,500 yards (1,372 meters) above Battery Parsons. On 24 January, two 100-pound (45-kg) shells fired by the 1st Connecticut Heavy Artillery Regiment at Fort McPherson then struck her, one of them passing through her magazine. Her crew abandoned ship, and all but two reached safety before her magazine exploded, wrecking her and enveloping her in flames.
Henry	Netherlands	The ship ran aground on the Goodwin Sands, Kent, United Kingdom. She was on a voyage from Rotterdam, South Holland to New York City, United States. She was refloated and resumed her voyage.
Lady Jocelyn	United Kingdom	The steamship was driven ashore and damaged 10 nautical miles (19 km) north of Madras, India. She was refloated the next day with assistance from Euphrates (United Kingdom).
Maria	Belgium	The tjalk was sunk at Antwerp in a collision with Sophia Frances (Belgium).
Maynards	United Kingdom	The ship collided with HMS Cadmus (Royal Navy) and was severely damaged. She was towed in to Plymouth, Devon by HMS Cadmus.

== 24 January ==
List of shipwrecks: 24 January 1865
Ship	State	Description
Cloda	United Kingdom	The steamship ran aground and broke in two 3 nautical miles (5.6 km) north of Huacho, Peru. All on board were rescued. She was on a voyage from Callao, Peru to Guayaquil, Ecuador.
Mount's Bay	United Kingdom	The ship was driven ashore at Honfleur, Calvados, France. Her crew were rescued. She was refloated on 2 February and taken in to Honfleur for repairs.
CSS Scorpion	Confederate States Navy	American Civil War, Battle of Trent's Reach: The torpedo boat was run aground on the James River in Virginia and was abandoned. A United States Navy launch crew captured and refloated her on 27 January.

== 25 January ==
List of shipwrecks: 25 January 1865
Ship	State	Description
Agaphea	United Kingdom	The ship was driven ashore and wrecked near Newcastle, County Dublin. Her crew were rescued. She was on a voyage from Cardiff, Glamorgan to Dublin.
Armenian	United Kingdom	The Elder, Dempster & Co cargo ship ran onto the Arklow Bank in the Irish Sea off the coast of County Wicklow and was wrecked with the loss of four lives. Survivors were rescued by the steamship Montague (United Kingdom). Four crew of the Arklow Lightship ( Trinity House) were lost attempting a rescue. Armenian was on a voyage from Liverpool, Lancashire to Madeira, Teneriffe, Canary Islands and the west coast of Africa.
Isabella	United Kingdom	The ship collided with the brig Ellen (United Kingdom) and ran aground on the Barber Sand, in the North Sea off the coast of Norfolk. She was on a voyage from Newcastle upon Tyne, Northumberland to Fécamp, Seine-Inférieure, France. She was refloated and put in to Great Yarmouth, Norfolk in a leaky condition.
Niagara	United Kingdom	The ship ran aground on the Burbo Bank, in Liverpool Bay. She was on a voyage from Liverpool to Havre de Grâce, Seine-Inférieure, France.
Seahorse	United Kingdom	The ship ran aground in the Hooghly River. She was refloated and resumed her voyage.
Vincenzi Vicaro	Italy	The ship struck a rock at Ilfracombe, Devon, United Kingdom and was holed. SHe was on a voyage from Genoa to Cardiff, Glamorgan, United Kingdom.
Wave	United Kingdom	The ship was driven ashore and wrecked between Horsey and Sea Palling, Norfolk. Her crew were rescued. She was on a voyage from Seaham, County Durham to London.

== 26 January ==
List of shipwrecks: 26 January 1865
Ship	State	Description
USS Dai Ching	United States Navy	American Civil War: The gunboat ran aground on the Combahee River in South Carolina while under fire by a Confederate artillery battery. She was shelled for seven hours, taking 30 hits, and nine members of her crew were wounded. The tug USS Clover (United States Navy) attempted to tow her off, but the tow line parted. After her last gun was knocked out, Dai Ching was burned by her crew to prevent her capture by Confederate forces. Her crew escaped aboard Clover except for five men captured by the Confederates.
Francis & Ann	(United Kingdom of Great Britain and Ireland) Jersey	The schooner struck the Helwick Shoal, in the Bristol Channel and was abandoned by her crew, who reached the Helwick Lightship ( Trinity House), from where they were rescued. Francis and Ann came ashore at Overton, Glamorgan. She was on a voyage from Palermo, Sicily, Italy to Bristol, Gloucestershire.
CSS Hornet	Confederate States Navy	American Civil War: The torpedo boat sank with the loss of at least one life after colliding with the steamer CSS William Allison (Confederate States Navy) on the James River in Virginia.
Macduff	United Kingdom	The ship foundered in the Atlantic Ocean. She was on a voyage from Cardiff, Glamorgan to Pará, Brazil.
Sphere	United Kingdom	The ship was severely damaged at Havre de Grâce, Seine-Inférieure, France when Adelaide (United Kingdom) drove into her. She was consequently beached.
Union	United Kingdom	The ship was abandoned. She was on a voyage from Youghal, County Cork to Kenmore. She was taken in to Crookhaven, County Cork in a derelict condition.

== 27 January ==
List of shipwrecks: 27 January 1865
Ship	State	Description
Annie de Saint Jean de Luz	France	The ship was wrecked at Pernambuco, Brazil. she was on a voyage from Havre de Grâce, Seine-Inférieure to Pernambuco.
Eclipse	United States	The 223-ton sternwheel paddle steamer exploded on the Tennessee River near Johnsonville, Tennessee, killing 38.
Frances Harriet Mills	(United Kingdom of Great Britain and Ireland) British North America	The ship ran aground at Yarmouth, Nova Scotia and was severely damaged. She was on a voyage from Saint John, New Brunswick to Halifax, Nova Scotia.
Henrietta	Netherlands	The schooner was wrecked at Cap La Hougue, Manche, France. She was on a voyage from Amsterdam, North Holland to Venezuela.
Kate Carnie	United Kingdom	The full-rigged ship ran aground at Rangoon, Burma. She was on a voyage from Rangoon to Singapore, Straits Settlements. She was refloated and resumed her voyage.
Robin Hood	United Kingdom	The pilot cutter was sunk in a collision in the Bristol Channel off Ilfracombe, Devon. Her crew were rescued. The wreck came ashore at Langland, Glamorgan.
Scotia	United Kingdom	The brig collided with the steamship Merlin (United Kingdom) at Saint John's, Newfoundland, British North America and was wrecked. She was on a voyage from Brigus, Newfoundland to Lisbon, Portugal.
Tres Hermanos	Ecuador	The ship ran aground on the Goodwin Sands, Kent, United Kingdom. She was on a voyage from Hamburg to Guayaquil. She was refloated with the assistance of a lifeboat and a tug and taken in to Ramsgate, Kent, where she sank.

== 28 January ==
List of shipwrecks: 28 January 1865
Ship	State	Description
City of Benares	United Kingdom	The ship caught fire at Calcutta, India and was scuttled. She was a total loss.
Lord Maidstone	United Kingdom	The barque was abandoned and set afire in the Atlantic Ocean 75 nautical miles (139 km) off Queenstown, County Cork. Her crew were rescued by Bombay Packet (United Kingdom). Lord Maidstone was on a voyage from Troon, Ayrshire to Málaga, Spain.
Monad	United Kingdom	The ship ran aground at Pernambuco, Brazil. She was on a voyage from Liverpool, Lancashire to Pernambuco.
Pierre	Kingdom of Italy	The ship was abandoned off Cape Finisterre, Spain. She was on a voyage from Genoa, Italy to Cardiff, Glamorgan, United Kingdom.
Wanderer	United Kingdom	The ship ran aground and sank off Great Yarmouth, Norfolk. Her crew were rescued. She was on a voyage from Gothenburg, Sweden to London.

== 29 January ==
List of shipwrecks: 29 January 1865
Ship	State	Description
Anna Felicia	France	The schooner was driven ashore and wrecked on Guernsey, Channel Islands. Her crew were rescued. She was on a voyage from Bordeaux, Gironde to Rouen, Seine-Inférieure.
Barbara Innes	United Kingdom	The schooner was abandoned in the North Sea off the Isle of May. Her crew survived. She was on a voyage from Ipswich, Suffolk to Portgordon, Moray.
Bee	United Kingdom	The schooner collided with a collier schooner off the Middle Lightship ( Trinity House) and was abandoned by her crew. She was on a voyage from Montrose, Forfarshire to London. Bee was subsequently taken in to Brightlingsea, Essex.
Britannia	United Kingdom	The smack ran aground on the Gimblet Rock. She was refloated and beached at Abererch, Caernarfonshire.
Choice	United Kingdom	The ship struck the Governor Rock and was damaged. She was on a voyage from Odesa, Russia to Falmouth, Cornwall. She was taken in to Falmouth, where she sank.
Cyclops	Denmark	The ship was driven ashore on Skagen. She was on a voyage from Odense to Grimsby, Lincolnshire, United Kingdom.
Glimpse	United Kingdom	The ship ran aground on the Tongue Sand. She was on a voyage from London to the Canary Islands. She was refloated and put in to Brixham, Devon in a leaky condition.
Josephine	United Kingdom	The schooner was run into by a brig and sank in the English Channel off St Albans Head, Dorset. Her crew were rescued by the brig Hubertus (United Kingdom). Josephine was on a voyage from Rouen, Seine-Inférieure, France to Grangemouth, Stirlingshire.
Marquis of Anglesey	United Kingdom	The smack was driven ashore and wrecked at Pwllheli, Caernarfonshire with the loss of all four people on board. She was on a voyage from Pwllheli to Abersoch.
Martha Brader	United Kingdom	The schooner was driven ashore in St. Catherine's Bay, Jersey, Channel Islands. Her crew were rescued. She was on a voyage from Ardrossan, Ayrshire to Saint-Malo, Ille-et-Vilaine, France. She was refloated on 31 January and taken in to Jersey for repairs.
Minero Judste	Mexico	The ship was driven ashore and wrecked at Clonakilty, County Cork, United Kingdom. She was on a voyage from Matamoras to Liverpool, Lancashire, United Kingdom.
Thomas	United Kingdom	The schooner was driven into Ryde Pier, Isle of Wight. Both were damaged.
Vulcan	United Kingdom	The ship was driven ashore and wrecked at Belhaven, Lothian. Her four crew were rescued by the Coast Guard using rocket apparatus. She was on a voyage from Newcastle upon Tyne, Northumberland to Aberdeen.
Willie Ridley	United Kingdom	The brig was abandoned off the coast of Cornwall. Her eight crew were rescued by the Plymouth Lifeboat. She was on a voyage from Plymouth, Devon to Newport, Monmouthshire. She was later reboareded.

== 30 January ==
List of shipwrecks: 30 January 1865
Ship	State	Description
Anne and Margaret	United Kingdom	The ship sank off Great Orme, Caernarfonshire. Her crew were rescued.
Assaye	United Kingdom	The East Indiaman was driven ashore and wrecked near Galley Head, County Cork with the loss of her captain. She was on a voyage from Bombay, India to Liverpool, Lancashire.
Certes	Malta	The ship was wrecked near Ardmore, County Waterford, United Kingdom with the loss of six of her sixteen crew. Survivors were rescued by the Ardmore Lifeboat ant the Coast Guard.
Clontarf	United Kingdom	The ship ran aground off Winterton-on-Sea, Norfolk. She was on a voyage from Sunderland, County Durham to Alexandria, Egypt. She was refloated and put in to Great Yarmouth, Norfolk in a leay condiotion, her crew refusing to proceed.
Danish Beauty	United Kingdom	The ship was driven ashore west of Dover, Kent. Her crew were rescued. She was on a voyage from Hamburg to Cardiff, Glamorgan.
Dekar	United Kingdom	The schooner ran aground at Felixtowe, Suffolk. She was on a voyage from Hull, Yorkshire to Portland, Dorset.
Dom Pedro	Portugal	The steamship was damaged by fire at Liverpool.
Hants	United Kingdom	The brig was driven ashore at Ballycotton, County Cork. She was on a voyage from Odesa, Russia to Cork.
Harmony	United Kingdom	The schooner was driven ashore at Glenarm, County Antrim.
Jane and Agnes	(United Kingdom of Great Britain and Ireland) Isle of Man	The ship was driven ashore and wrecked at Douglas. Her crew were rescued. She was on a voyage from Laxey to Saltney, Cheshire.
John Venner	United Kingdom	The ship was wrecked in the Hooghly River. Her captain died the next day. She was on a voyage from Calcutta, India to Colombo, Ceylon.
Lady Hobart	United Kingdom	The full-rigged ship was driven ashore on Ireland's Eye, County Dublin. Her 22 crew were rescued. She was on a voyage from Liverpool to Bermuda.
Louise	Prussia	The brig was driven ashore and wrecked at Seaton, Cornwall, United Kingdom. She was on a voyage from Santos, Brazil to Falmouth, Cornwall.
Margaret	United Kingdom	The sloop was abandoned in the Irish Sea. Her crew were rescued by the pilot boat No. 9 (United Kingdom).
Marion	United Kingdom	The ship was driven ashore and wrecked at Tara Point, County Antrim. She was on a voyage from Genoa, Italy to Ardrossan, Ayrshire. She was refloated on 23 February and taken in tow for Ardrossan.
Mary and Jane	United Kingdom	The schooner ran aground and sank in the River Wear. She was refloated on 8 February.
Milla	Flag unknown	The ship foundered off Guernsey, Channel Islands.
Newland	United Kingdom	The schooner was abandoned off Point Lynas, Anglesey. Her crew were rescued by the pilot boat No. 9 (United Kingdom). Newland was taken in to Amlwch in a sinking condition.
Osier	United Kingdom	The schooner was driven ashore at Carrickfergus, County Antrim.
Panope	United Kingdom	The brigantine was wrecked at the Hook Lighthouse, County Wexford with the loss of a crew member. She was on a voyage from Brazil to Liverpool.
Rebecca	France	The ship ran aground in the Rio Grande. She was on a voyage from Marseille, Bouches-du-Rhône to the Rio Grande.
Sara	United Kingdom	The ship was driven ashore on Spiekeroog, Kingdom of Hanover. Her crew were rescued. She was on a voyage from Ipswich, Suffolk to Geestemunde.
Sextus	Malta	The barque was wrecked in Ardmore Bay with the loss of eight of her seventeen crew. She was on a voyage from Sulina, Ottoman Empire to Queenstown, County Cork, United Kingdom.
Theodore	France	The ship was driven ashore and wrecked at Swansea, Glamorgan, United Kingdom. She was on a voyage from Saint-Malo, Ille-et-Vilaine to Swansea.
Trefew	United Kingdom	The ship sank off Great Orme. Her crew were rescued.
Zenith	United Kingdom	The brig ran aground and sank in the River Wear. She was refloated the next day.

== 31 January ==
List of shipwrecks: 31 January 1865
Ship	State	Description
Catana	United Kingdom	The brig struck a rock in the Bahamas and became severely leaky. She was on a voyage from Cardiff, Glamorgan to Nassau, Bahamas and Havana, Cuba.
Dublin	United Kingdom	The schooner was wrecked in Dundrum Bay. Her four crew were rescued by the Dundrum Bay Lifeboat.
Gleaner	United Kingdom	The brig was driven ashore at Blyth, Northumberland. She was on a voyage from Calais, France to Blyth.
Great Northern	United Kingdom	The steamship ran aground at Hartlepool, County Durham. She was on a voyage from Middlesbrough, Yorkshire to London. She was refloated.
Huntley	United Kingdom	The ship ran aground on the Red Sand. She was refloated and beached at Sheerness, Kent in a sinking condition.
Inconstant	United Kingdom	The brig was driven ashore at Blyth. She was on a voyage from Boulogne, Pas-de-Calais, France to Blyth.
Julia	United Kingdom	The brig was wrecked on the Silver Key Bank. Her crew were rescued by the steamship Catalina (Spain). Julia was on a voyage from Newport, Monmouthshire to Port-au-Prince, Haiti.
Lady Hobart	United Kingdom	The ship sank off Malahide, County Dublin. Her crew were rescued. She was on a voyage from Liverpool, Lancashire to Bermuda.
Macedonia	United Kingdom	The brig ran aground at Sunderland, County Durham. She was refloated.
Marlesminde	Denmark	The schooner was driven ashore in the Mariager Fjord. Her crew were rescued.
Mary Jane	United Kingdom	The schooner ran aground at Sunderland. She was refloated on 7 February.
Numero Quatro	(Spain) Cuba	The ship was driven ashore at Clonakilty, County Cork, United Kingdom. She was on a voyage from Matamoros, Mexico to Liverpool.
Stirlingshire	United Kingdom	The barque was abandoned off the Tuskar Rock with the loss of seven of her fifteen crew. She was on a voyage from Demerara, British Guiana to London. The derelict came ashore in South Bay, County Wexford in a waterlogged condition. She was refloated on 31 January and taken in to Waterford.
Victorine Maria	France	The ship was driven ashore and wrecked at Arbroath, Forfarshire, United Kingdom. She was on a voyage from Blyth to Caen, Calvados.

== Unknown date ==
List of shipwrecks: Unknown date in January 1865
Ship	State	Description
Adelaide Bell	United States	The ship was destroyed by fire in the Chincha Islands, Peru before 6 January.
Africa	United Kingdom	The brig was driven ashore at Dundalk, County Louth. She was later refloated and towed to Belfast, County Antrim for repairs.
Alectia	Flag unknown	The steamship ran aground at Rotterdam, South Holland, Netherlands before 16 January.
Ariadne	United Kingdom	The full-rigged ship ran aground in the Marabout Channel and was beached.
British Queen	United Kingdom	The ship ran aground off Flamborough Head, Yorkshire. She was on a voyage from Carboneras, Spain to South Shields, County Durham. She was refloated and taken in tow by a tug as she was in a leaky condition.
Catherine MacIvor	United Kingdom	The ship was driven ashore near Oban, Argyllshire.
Chief	United Kingdom	The brig ran aground near Provincetown, Massachusetts, United States. She was on a voyage from Havana, Cuba to Boston, Massachusetts.
Dahome	France	The steamship foundered in the Mediterranean Sea. She was on a voyage from Marseille, Bouches-du-Rhône to Alexandria, Egypt.
Dunlop	United Kingdom	The ship was driven ashore at Pera, Ottoman Empire. She was on a voyage from Constanţa, Ottoman Empire to Falmouth, Cornwall. She was refloated.
Edmund Kay	United Kingdom	The ship ran aground at Alexandria. She was on a voyage from Newcastle upon Tyne, Northumberland to Alexandria. She was refloated with the assistance of two steamships and taken in to Alexandria.
Elizabeth Kimball	United States	The clipper was driven ashore in the Trial Islands, British Columbia, Canada. Subsequently refloated and repaired at San Francisco, California.
Ellen and Mary	United Kingdom	The ship struck the Crow Rock and was abandoned.
Emma	United Kingdom	The ship was driven ashore at St. Ives, Cornwall.
CSS Equator	Confederate States Navy	American Civil War: The gunboat was burned on the Cape Fear River in North Carolina to prevent her capture by Union forces.
Flash	United States	The schooner was driven ashore near "Fronter Tobasco" before 19 January.
Governor Elias	United Kingdom	The ship was wrecked near "Avona" before 10 January.
Istamboul	United Kingdom	The brig foundered in the Atlantic Ocean (45°20′N 6°36′W) before 23 January. Her crew were rescued by the barque Zetus (United Kingdom). Istamboul was on a voyage from Constanţa to Falmouth.
Jenny Jones	United Kingdom	The ship was abandoned in the Bay of Biscay. Her crew were rescued by Hackmatack (United Kingdom) and another vessel.
Johnston Castle	India	The steamship was wrecked off the Sindhudurg Fort, Malvan.
King of Italy	United Kingdom	The ship foundered in the English Channel off the coast of Côtes-du-Nord, France.
Maid of Kent	(United Kingdom of Great Britain and Ireland) New Zealand	The 40-ton schooner left Napier, New Zealand, for Kaipara Harbour in January, and was not sighted again. A section of her stern was washed up on the west coast of Northland near Maunganui Bluff several months later.
Marie Elizabeth	Duchy of Holstein	The ship was driven ashore on Læsø, Denmark before 18 January. She was on a voyage from Neustadt in Holstein to an English port. She was refloated and taken in to Fredrikshavn, Denmark.
Mary Ann Curry	United Kingdom	The barque was driven ashore at Cape Carabournou, Ottoman Empire before 17 January. She was on a voyage from Thessaloniki, Greece to a British port. She was refloated and put back to Thessaloniki.
Monarch	United Kingdom	The tug sank at Portsmouth, Hampshire. She was refloated on 19 January and beached.
Odd Fellow	United States	The 70-ton sidewheel paddle steamer was sunk by ice on the Mississippi River at Columbus, Kentucky, on either 1 or 6 January.
Poictiers	United Kingdom	The barque was abandoned off Cape Horn, Chile before 27 January. Seven crew were rescued by Nankin (France). Poictiers was on a voyage from Cardiff, Glamorgan to Callao, Peru.
R. E. Lee	Mexico	The ship was wrecked at the mouth of the Rio Grande before 9 January with the loss of twelve of her crew. Survivors were rescued by the barque Castellina (France).
Rotterdam	Netherlands	The steamship ran aground at Rotterdam before 16 January. She was refloated.
Sainte Anne	France	The ship was wrecked on the Noord Hinder sandbank, in the North Sea. Her crew were rescued. She was on a voyage from the River Tyne to Antwerp, Belgium.
Saline	United States	The 176-ton sternwheel paddle steamer was stranded on Clark's Bar.
Sarah Ellen	United Kingdom	The schooner foundered in the Bristol Channel off Porlock, Somerset. She was on a voyage from Bridgwater, Somerset to Cork.
Scanderby	United Kingdom	The ship was driven ashore in the Belfast Lough before 19 January. She was refloated.
Taneley	France	The ship collided with the steamship Mozambique (France) and sank. She was on a voyage from Madagascar to Réunion.
Vibilia	United Kingdom	The ship was wrecked at "Palurna".
Victoria	United Kingdom	The ship was driven ashore at Newport, Monmouthshire.
CSS Wasp	Confederate States Navy	American Civil War: The torpedo boat was sunk by Union artillery fire after running aground in the waters of Virginia.
William	United Kingdom	The ship foundered in Bridgwater Bay.
William and Jane	United Kingdom	The ship ran aground on the Gunfleet Sand, in the North Sea off the coast of Essex. She was on a voyage from Hartlepool, County Durham to London. She subsequently became a wreck.
