= USS Clover =

USS Clover may refer to more than one ship in the U.S. Navy:

- USS Clover (1863), a tugboat commissioned 28 November 1863.
- USS Clover (1899), a lighthouse tender during World War I.

== See also ==
- USCGC Clover (WLB-292), a Cactus (A)-class buoy tender operated by the United States Coast Guard between 1942 and 1990.
