= USS Tulip (1862) =

Gunboat of the United States Navy

History

United States
- Builder: James C. Jewett & Co.
- Laid down: 1862
- Launched: 1863
- Acquired: 22 June 1863
- Commissioned: 1863
- Fate: Exploded and sank 11 November 1864

General characteristics
- Displacement: 183 tons
- Length: 97 ft 3 in (29.64 m)
- Beam: 21 ft 9 in (6.63 m)
- Draft: 8 ft (2.4 m)
- Depth of hold: 9 ft 6 in (2.90 m)
- Propulsion: steam engine; screw-propelled
- Complement: 57
- Armament: 2 × 24-pounder guns; 1 × 20-poundr Parrott rifle

USS Tulip was a 183-ton steamer acquired by the Union Navy during the American Civil War.

Tulip was outfitted with heavy guns and was used by the Navy as a gunboat to patrol navigable waterways of the Confederacy in order to prevent the South from trading with other countries.

== Service history ==
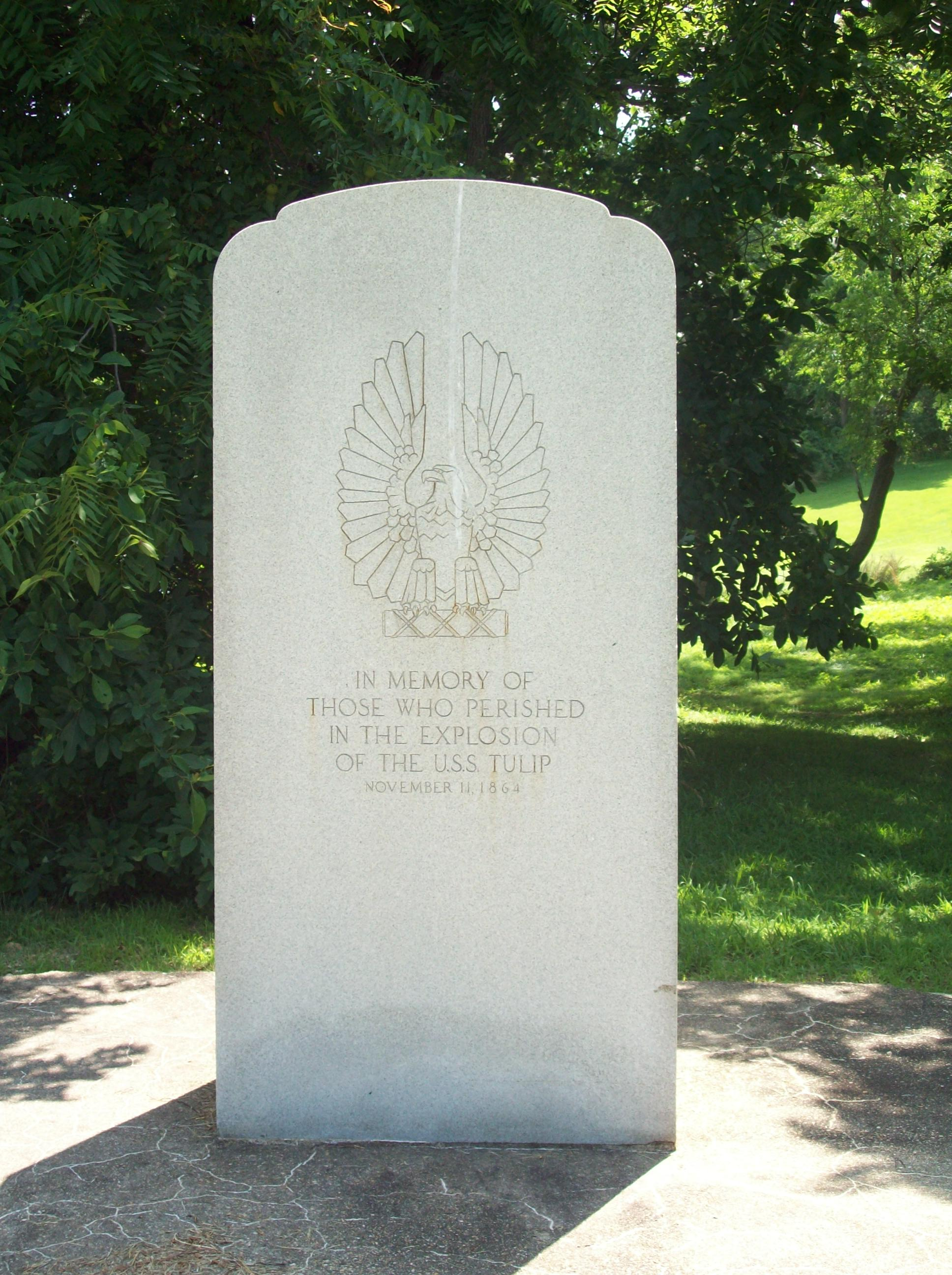
Tulip memorial, St. Inigoes, Maryland

During the later stages of the Taiping Rebellion, Shanghai local authorities contracted Henry Gamaliel Ward, brother of American mercenary Frederick Townsend Ward who had died in combat fighting for the Qing Dynasty earlier, to purchase 5 steamers. Henry Ward ordered the constructions of 3 steamers, one of them being Chih Kiang (Chinese: 浙江; pinyin: Zhèjiāng; lit. 'Zhejiang'), the other two being Dai Ching (later USS Dai Ching) and Kiang Soo (later USS Fuchsia). Instead of delivering the steamers to China, Ward re-sold them to the Union Navy. Chih Kiang was renamed Tulip in August. Renamed Tulip and refitted for service as a tugboat and gunboat, the screw steamer joined the Potomac River Flotilla in August 1863. That force patrolled the river protecting Union waterborne communications between the nation's capital and the port cities of the divided nation during the Civil War.

She initially performed towing duties at the Washington Navy Yard, and then served with the flotilla in operations against Confederate forces in the Rappahannock River. In the latter duties, the ship carried Federal troops and supported naval landing parties which from time to time went ashore for operations against Confederate traffic across the river. As she continued this wartime riverine service into 1864, Tulip developed a defective starboard boiler. Commander Foxhall A. Parker Jr., commanding the Potomac Flotilla, ordered the ship home to the Washington Navy Yard so that repairs could be made to correct her defective propulsion plant. Tulip got underway on 11 November with orders restricting her steaming on the port boiler only. Not long after departing from St. Inigoes, Maryland, her engineers, against all orders, began supplying steam to the starboard boiler. When abreast Ragged Point (east of Ragged Point Beach), the boiler exploded and tore the fragile ship apart—killing 47 men instantly—of the 57-man complement. Of the 10 survivors, two died later of their injuries.
