= USS Fuchsia =

Gunboat of the United States Navy

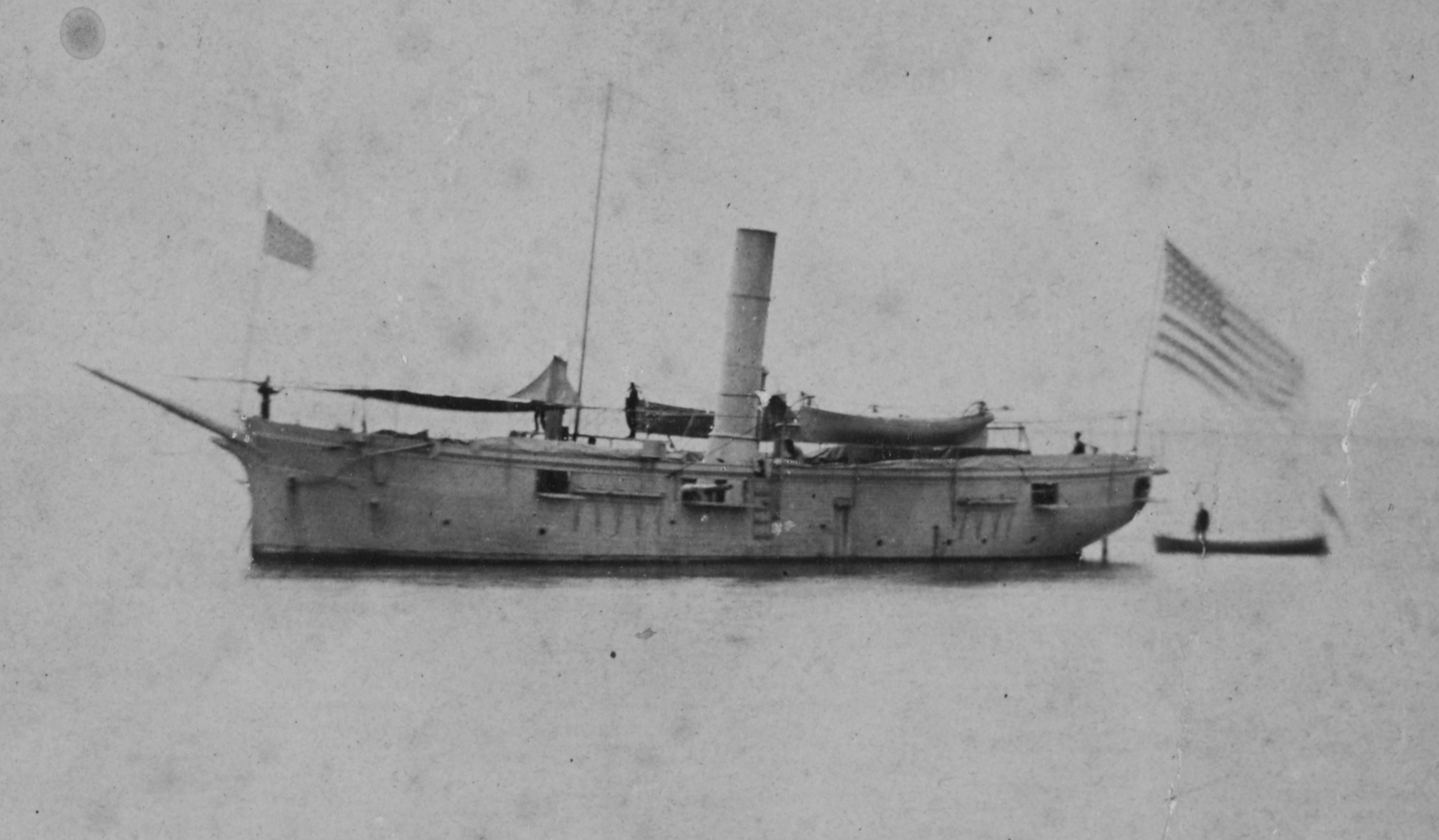
- USS Fuchsia

History

United States
- Builder: James C. Jewett & Co.
- Launched: 1863
- Acquired: 22 June 1863
- Commissioned: August 1863
- Decommissioned: 5 August 1865
- Fate: Sold, 23 September 1865

General characteristics
- Displacement: 240 tons
- Length: 98 ft 3 in (29.95 m)
- Beam: 21 ft 9 in (6.63 m)
- Draught: 8 ft (2.4 m)
- Propulsion: steam engine; screw-propelled
- Armament: one 30-pounder rifle; one 24-pounder howitzer

USS Fuchsia was a steamer acquired by the Union Navy during the American Civil War. She was used by the Navy to patrol navigable waterways of the Confederacy to prevent the South from trading with other countries.

Fuchsia, a steam tug, was built in 1863 by Fincourt, New York City; purchased by the Navy 16 June 1863; and commissioned in August 1863, Acting Master W. T. Street in command.

== Service history ==
During the later stages of the Taiping Rebellion, Shanghai local authorities contracted Henry Gamaliel Ward, brother of American mercenary Frederick Townsend Ward who had died in combat fighting for the Qing dynasty earlier, to purchase 5 steamers. Henry Ward ordered the constructions of 3 steamers, one of them being Kiang Soo (Chinese: 江蘇; pinyin: Jiāngsū; lit. 'Jiangsu'), the other two being Dai Ching (later USS Dai Ching) and Chih Kiang (later USS Tulip). Instead of delivering the steamers to China, Ward re-sold them to the Union Navy. Kiang Soo was purchased on 22 June 1863 and renamed Fuchsia in August.

Fuchsia reached Washington Navy Yard 8 August 1863 to join the Potomac Flotilla in patrol duty on the Potomac, Rappahannock, Piankatank, Tappahannock, Curitoman, and St. Mary's Rivers. On 21 October, sailing with USS Currituck, Fuchsia apprehended the steamer Three Brothers, sailing unladen without proper papers. Nine days later, as she cruised in the Rappahannock, she sent a landing party ashore to arrest two men known to be blockade runners, and the next day she took a Virginia soldier prisoner. On 7 March 1864, Fuchsia made a foray up the Piankatank, searching for the Army tug Titan previously taken by the Confederates. Finding the tug burned to the water's edge, she sent men to disable the tug's boilers, preventing their future use by the Confederates. Similar reconnaissance and patrol duty, in the course of which she often fired on Confederate detachments ashore and in turn came under fire, continued throughout the war. Fuchsia cruised the same waters until decommissioned at Washington, D.C., 5 August 1865. She was sold 23 September 1865 to Russell & Company for US$11,000.
