= USLHT Clover =

United States Lighthouse Service vessel

History

United States
- Name: USLHT Clover
- Namesake: Clover, a plant of the genus Trifolium, bearing compound leaves with three leaflets and tight heads of small flowers
- Owner: United States Lighthouse Service
- Operator: United States Lighthouse Service
- Builder: Burger & Burger Shipyard, Manitowoc, Wisconsin
- Launched: 1899
- Acquired: 1908
- Commissioned: 1908
- Decommissioned: 1935
- Fate: Sold, 1935; Retired, 1947

General characteristics
- Displacement: 205 tons
- Length: 88 ft (27 m) o/a (as built); 93 ft (28 m) (after 1932)
- Beam: 22 ft 10 in (6.96 m)
- Draft: 6 ft 4 in (1.93 m)
- Propulsion: Coal-fired steam engine; 100 bhp (75 kW); 1 shaft
- Armament: None

The United States Lighthouse Tender Clover is the third Lighthouse Service vessel to bear this name. She was privately built in 1899 and christened Two Myrtles, after the owner's wife and daughter. She was purchased by the Lighthouse Service in 1908 and retained her name. Originally assigned to the 11th Lighthouse District, she was based at Milwaukee where she service the Great Lakes, as an engineering tender.

Laid up in 1911, she was rebuilt, with new boilers added, and renamed Clover in 1912. She was then assigned first to Detroit and then eventually to Sault Ste. Marie. She serviced aids to navigation on the St. Mary's River.

Clover was attached to the U.S. Navy at the start of World War I. Attached to the 9th, 10th and 11th Naval Districts, she continued lighthouse duty on the Great Lakes throughout the war. She was returned to the Lighthouse Service on 1 July 1919.

In 1932, she was rebuilt once again and was lengthened to 93-feet.

Clover was sold in 1935. Her new owners renamed her again, and she was once again known as Two Myrtles. She was retired due to age in 1947.
