= PS Lelia =

Paddle steamer built in 1864

Coordinates: 53.48763°N 3.38395°W

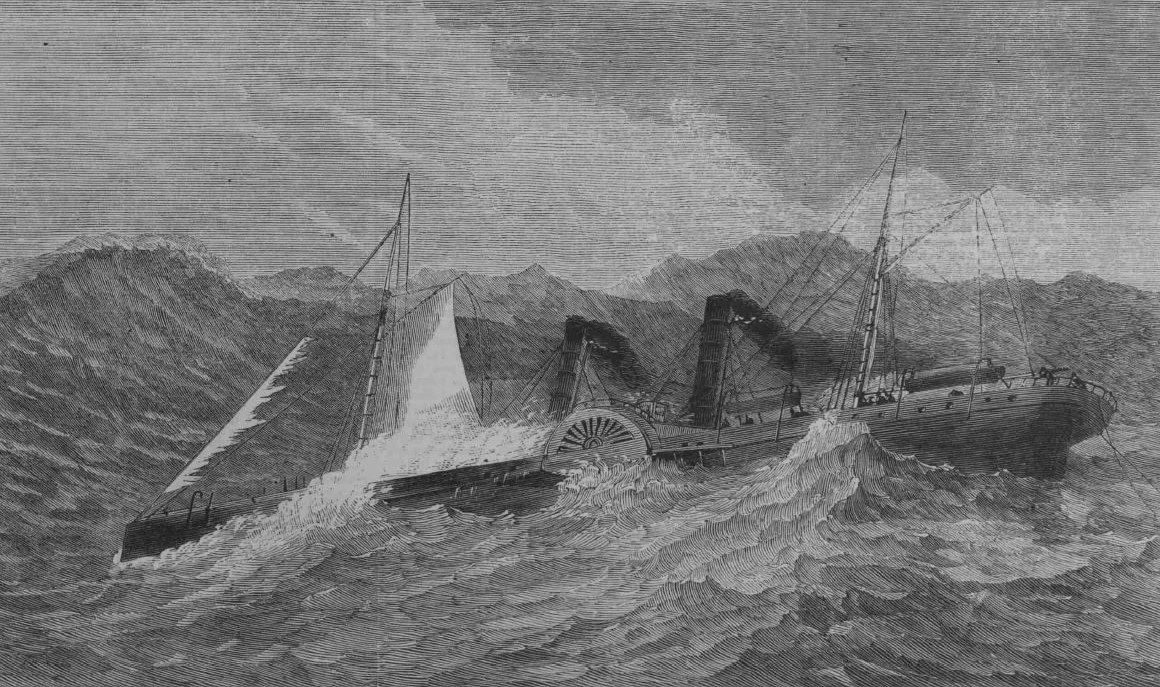
PS Lelia in distress

PS Lelia was a steamship built in 1864, during the American Civil War for use as a blockade runner for the Confederate States of America. She sank in Liverpool Bay in 1865 in an incident that caused 46 fatalities.

== History ==
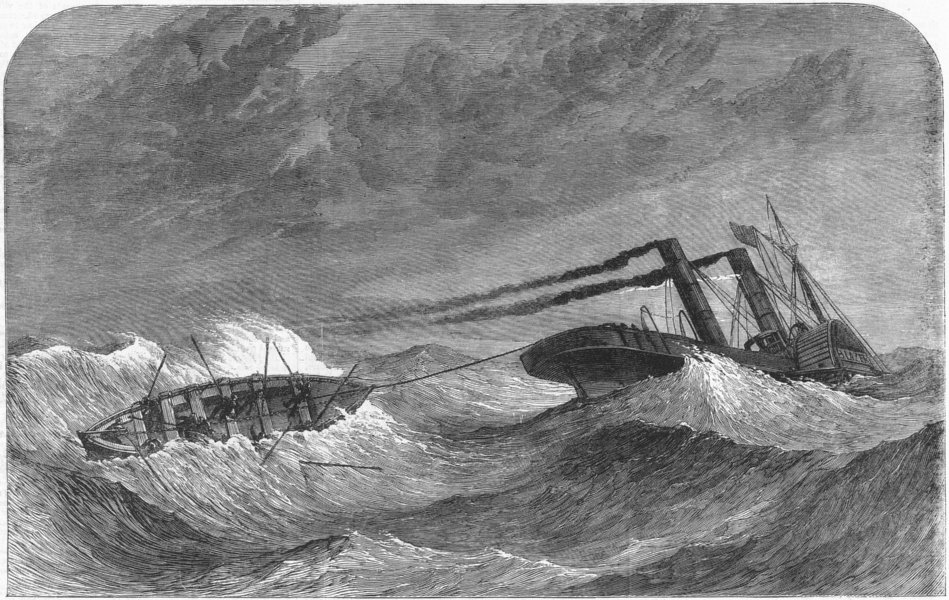
Upsetting of the Liverpool lifeboat on her way to rescue the crew of the Lelia while under tow of the Blazer

Lelia was built by William C Miller & Company of Toxteth as one of a trio of blockade running sister ships ordered for the Anglo-Confederate concern, William G. Crenshaw & Company. She was a 252-foot (77 m) paddle steamship of 640 BRT. Her hull was built of steel, an unusual and expensive material for shipbuilding at the time. The engines and other machinery were built by Fawcett Preston & Company and rated at 300 nhp. (The Confederate States Navy warship, CSS Florida, had also been built at Miller's yard.)

She left the River Mersey, with a largely Liverpool-based crew, and several prominent Confederate naval officers, on her maiden voyage on 14 January 1865 bound for Wilmington, North Carolina, via Bermuda, aiming to run the Union blockade.

Lelia was heavily laden, and when she hit bad weather off the coast of North Wales, large waves knocked her anchors loose and through the deck, swamping her. She sank near the lightship Prince off the Great Orme.

Two boats were able to leave the stricken ship, but one capsized and only twelve survivors (out of fifty-one on board) reached the safety of the lightship.

The next day the Liverpool No 1 Lifeboat went to the scene under tow by the steam tug Blazer, but was itself swamped by waves, with the loss of seven out of its 11 crew.

== Wreck ==
The wreck of Lelia was discovered in the early 1990s when a diver recovered a bell from the seabed inscribed 'Lelia 1864'. It lies 10 miles north west off Hilbre Point, Wirral. The remains include one of the paddle wheels, the engine and boiler rooms, as well as less well-preserved cargo areas and a steam winch. The wreck was given protected status when it was added to the National Heritage list for England by the Department for Digital, Culture, Media and Sport in August 2019.

== See also ==
- List of United Kingdom disasters by death toll
- Naval battles of the American Civil War
