= USS Dai Ching =

History

United States
- Name: USS Dai Ching
- Namesake: Previous name retained
- Builder: James C. Jewett & Co.
- Launched: 1863
- Acquired: 21 April 1863
- Commissioned: 11 June 1863
- Fate: Burned 26 January 1865

General characteristics
- Displacement: 520 tons
- Length: 170 ft 6 in (51.97 m)
- Beam: 29 ft 4 in (8.94 m)
- Draft: 9 ft 6 in (2.90 m)
- Speed: 6 knots
- Complement: 83 officers and enlisted men
- Armament: 4 × 24-pounder smoothbore guns; 2 × 20-pounder rifled guns; 1 × 100-pounder Parrott rifle

USS Dai Ching was a steam gunboat in commissioned into service in the United States Navy in 1863. She served in the Union Navy during the American Civil War until her loss in 1865.

== Construction, acquisition, and commissioning ==
During the later stages of the Taiping Rebellion, Shanghai local authorities contracted Henry Gamaliel Ward, brother of American mercenary Frederick Townsend Ward who had died in combat fighting for the Qing Dynasty earlier, to purchase 5 steamers. Henry Ward ordered the constructions of 3 steamers, one of them being Dai Ching (Chinese: 大清; pinyin: Dàqīng; lit. 'Great Qing'), the other two being Kiang Soo (later USS Fuchsia) and Chih Kiang (later USS Tulip). Instead of delivering the steamers to China, Ward re-sold them to the Union Navy.

The U.S. Navy purchased her for US$117,575 on 21 April 1863 for Civil War service. Outfitted as a gunboat at the New York Navy Yard in Brooklyn, New York, and she was commissioned on 11 June 1863 with Lieutenant Commander J. C. Chaplin in command.

== Service history ==
Dai Ching joined in the search for the Confederate States Navy raider CSS Tacony in the North Atlantic Ocean off the northeastern coast of the United States between 14 and 20 June 1863. After putting into Norfolk, Virginia, for coal and engine repairs, she arrived off Charleston, South Carolina, on 23 July and the following day joined other vessels of the South Atlantic Blockading Squadron in the attack on Fort Wagner. On 25 July 1863 and again on 13–14 August 1863 she participated in assaults on Forts Wagner and Sumter, followed by a series of assaults on the other Confederate fortifications in Charleston Harbor between 17 and 22 August 1863. She also took part n the Union blockade of the Confederate States of America, and on 14 November 1863 she captured the schooner George Chisholm, a blockade runner with a cargo of salt, off the Santee River in South Carolina.

Dai Ching joined an expedition up the St. Johns River in Florida, and she remained in that area from 6 February to 7 March 1864. She then returned to patrolling off the South Carolina coast and in January 1865 patrolled in the Combahee River. She captured the schooner Coquette, loaded with cotton, on 26 January 1865.

Later that same day, Dai Ching came under fire by a three-gun Confederate artillery battery while she was on the Combahee River headed for Tar Bluff. Her pilot left the wheel and went below when the shelling started, and she ran aground. As the tide fell, the vessel settled so only her 100-pounder (45.4-kg) Parrott rifle could return fire. The armed tug USS Clover attempted to pull her off, but the tow line parted, and Clover was unable to offer further assistance. The Parrott rifle was knocked out at 3:00 p.m. After seven hours of shelling, during which Dai Ching had taken thirty hits by shell and shot, with her guns disabled and machinery wrecked, her crew set her afire to prevent her capture by the Confederates and abandoned ship. Her crew escaped aboard Clover except for five who were absent from the ship on duty and who were later captured by the Confederates.

The U.S. Navy removed the wreck of Dai Ching in 1906. A marsh island named Gunboat Island later formed in the river at the wreck site.
