= USS Clover (1863) =

Gunboat of the United States Navy

History

United States
- Acquired: 11 November 1863
- Commissioned: 28 November 1863
- Decommissioned: 26 July 1865
- Fate: Sold 21 September 1865

General characteristics
- Displacement: 129 tons
- Length: 92 ft (28 m)
- Beam: 19 ft (5.8 m)
- Draft: 9 ft (2.7 m)
- Propulsion: Steam engine
- Speed: 7 knots (13 km/h; 8.1 mph)
- Armament: one 12-pounder gun, one 12-pounder smoothbore gun

USS Clover was a steam gunboat acquired by the Union Navy during the American Civil War. She was used by the Navy to patrol navigable waterways of the Confederacy to prevent the South from trading with other countries.

== Service history ==
Originally the steam tug Daisy, the ship was purchased by the United States Navy on 11 November 1863 from Winsor and Company of Philadelphia, Pennsylvania. Outfitted as a gunboat at the Philadelphia Navy Yard, she was commissioned there on 28 November 1863 as USS Clover. Clover departed Philadelphia on 1 December 1863 to join the South Atlantic Blockading Squadron at Beaufort, South Carolina. She was employed on picket duty guarding the squadron's monitors, and on tug and dispatch service until the end of the war in April 1865.

On 26 January 1865, Clover captured the schooner Coquette and brought her into Port Royal, South Carolina. The same day, she went to the assistance of the gunboat USS Dai Ching, which was aground on the Combahee River and under fire from Confederate artillery batteries, but was unable to render further assistance after her tow line parted, and Dai Ching was abandoned and burned to prevent her capture by Confederate forces. After the war ended in April 1865, Clover joined in dragging for naval mines off Charleston, South Carolina. Arriving at the Philadelphia Navy Yard on 26 July 1865, Clover was decommissioned on 27 July 1865 and sold on 21 September 1865.
