= Section patrol craft =

Civilian vessel registered by the U.S. Navy during World War I

Ships of the United States Navy

Ships in current service
- Current ships

Ships grouped alphabetically
- A–B; C; D–F; G–H; I–K; L; M; N–O; P; Q–R; S; T–V; W–Z

Ships grouped by type
- Aircraft carriers; Airships; Amphibious warfare ships; Auxiliaries; Battlecruisers; Battleships; Cruisers; Destroyers; Destroyer escorts; Destroyer leaders; Escort carriers; Frigates; Hospital ships; Littoral combat ships; Mine warfare vessels; Monitors; Oilers; Patrol vessels; Registered civilian vessels; Sailing frigates; Steam frigates; Steam gunboats; Ships of the line; Sloops of war; Submarines; Torpedo boats; Torpedo retrievers; Unclassified miscellaneous; Yard and district craft

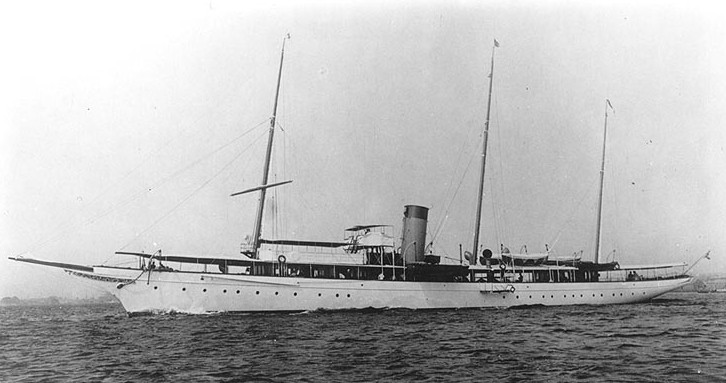
USS Kanawha II, later renamed USS Piqua, was a private yacht prior to her World War I Navy service. She received the section patrol number SP-130.

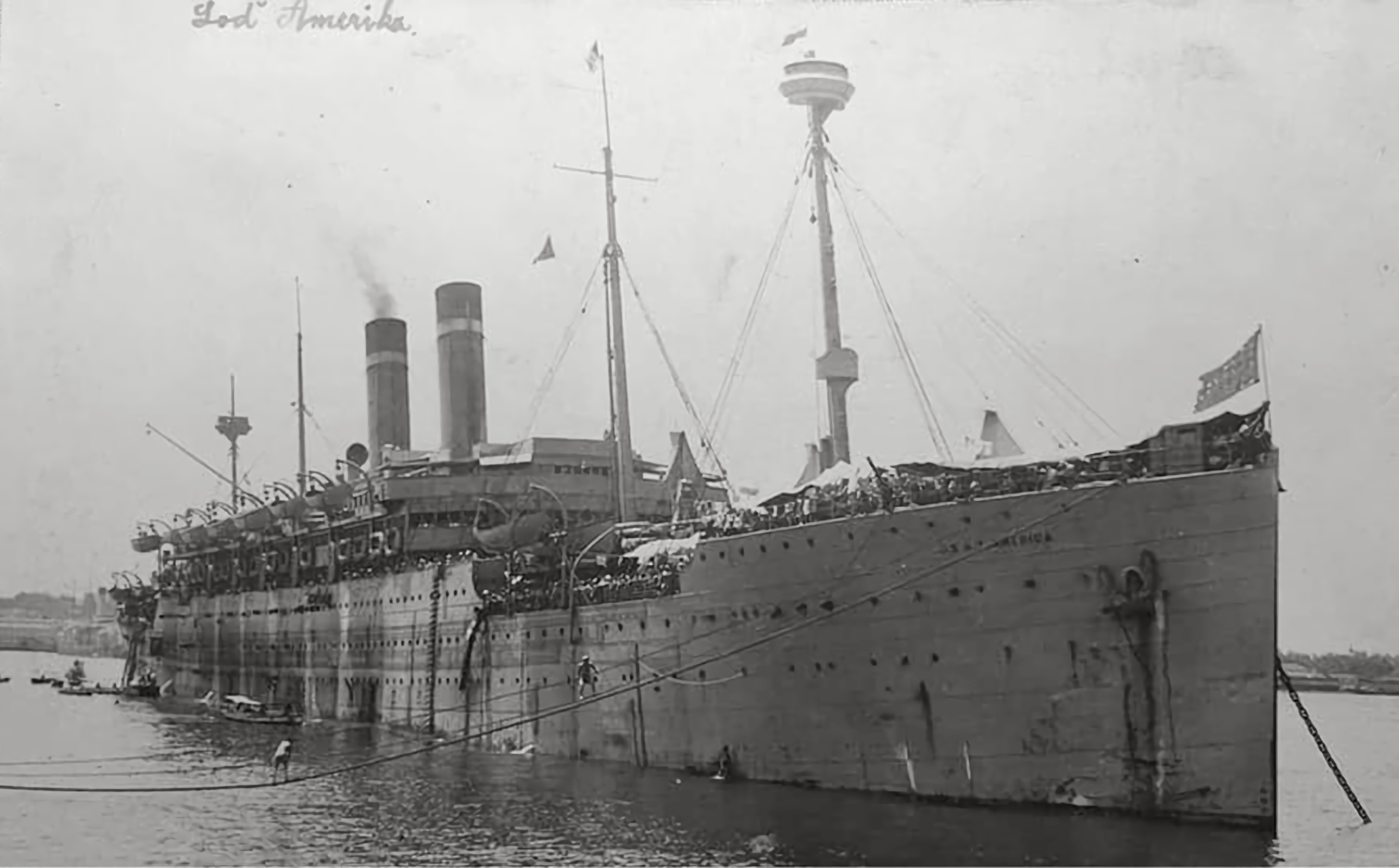
The troopship America was the former German ocean liner Amerika. She was assigned the U.S. Navy ID number 3006.

A Section Patrol Craft was a civilian vessel registered by the United States Navy for potential wartime service before, during, and shortly after World War I.

== Historical overview ==
=== The SP/ID registration system ===
In 1916, with World War I raging abroad, the U.S. Navy began a registry of privately owned pleasure craft and yachts that were available for patrol service in the event the United States was drawn into the conflict, which it eventually entered on 6 April 1917. Naval Registry Identification Numbers were assigned in a "Section Patrol" series beginning with SP-1 and ultimately extending to well over 4000.

As the registration process continued, other types of ships and craft (such as cargo ships, tankers, and passenger ships) were included which were not suited or intended for patrol duty and for which the "Section Patrol" designation was clearly inappropriate, and these were generally given "Identification" ("ID") numbers in the same series as the "SP" numbers. In addition, some vessels that were numbered with an "SP" prefix before 1918 later had that prefix changed to "ID". Many of the ships and craft assigned SP or ID numbers had no Navy service, while others that were acquired and employed by the Navy received no numbers.

The registry, and the SP/ID number series, was continued at least into the early 1920s, with new numbers being assigned to ships completed or examined after World War I ended on 11 November 1918. The latter category included some ships that served in the Navy without SP or ID numbers between 1917 and 1919.

=== SP/ID numbers and U.S. Navy hull numbers ===
The SP and ID registry numbers were not U.S. Navy "hull numbers," which would not be formally adopted until 17 July 1920. However, like hull numbers, the SP and ID numbers were used for record-keeping purposes and were often painted on the exterior of vessels (especially patrol types) to facilitate identification. They can therefore be considered precursors of the U.S. Navy hull number system instituted in July 1920 and still in use today. At least 67 vessels with ID / SP numbers were later given modern hull symbols, with a few (at least 7) retaining their ID or SP numbers under the new system.

== World War I section patrol (SP) and identification number (ID) series ==
Incomplete listing of civilian boats and ships commissioned during World War I for use as section patrol (SP) craft and civilian cargo ships, tankers, transports, etc., commissioned for U.S. Navy use during World War and given non-"SP" identification numbers (ID) in the "SP" numbering series.

=== Identification numbers (ID) ===
Many of these ships would be later sunk during World War II while in commercial service. Two would be deliberately sunk as Mulberry harbor breakwaters during the invasion of Normandy. Only sinkings while in US Navy service with an ID number are listed.

- USS Cherokee (ID-458), sank in storm 26 February 1918, 32 killed
- USS Fashion (ID-755), later YF-116
- USS De Grasse (ID-1217), later YP-506
- USS Patchogue (ID-1227), later YFB-1227
- USS W. F. Babcock (ID-1239)
- USS Massachusetts (ID-1255), later CM-4
- USS Aroostook (ID-1256), later CM-3
- USS Adirondack (ID-1270)
- USS J. B. Walker (ID-1272)
- USS Henry R. Mallory (ID-1280)
- USS Mundelta (ID-1301)
- USS Jean (ID-1308)
- USS Atglen (ID-1315), aka ID-1350
- USS Winifred (ID-1319)
- USS Suwanee (ID-1320)
- USS Moccasin (ID-1322)
- USS Oregonian (ID-1323)
- USS Vaterland (ID-1326)
- USS Buena Ventura (ID-1335), torpedoed 16 September 1918, no fatalities
- USS Maumee (ID-1339)
- USS Atglen (ID-1350), aka ID-1315
- USS Texan (ID-1354)
- USS Charlton Hall (ID-1359)
- USS General W. C. Gorgas (ID-1365)
- USS Newburgh (ID-1369)
- USS Caspian (ID-1380)
- USS Favorite (ID-1385), ex-SP-1385, later IX-45
- USS Friedrich Der Grosse (ID-1408)
- USS Covington (ID-1409), torpedoed 1 July 1918 by U-86, sank 2 July, 6 killed
- USS Alameda (ID-1432)
- USS General G. W. Goethals (ID-1443)
- USS Anna B. Smith (ID-1458)
- USS Ancon (ID-1467)
- USS Los Angeles (ID-1470)
- USS Craster Hall (ID-1486)
- USS Kerwood (ID-1489)
- USS Santa Rosalia (ID-1503)
- USS Walter D. Munson (ID-1510)
- USS Maui (ID-1514)
- USS Standard Arrow (ID-1532), later IX-142
- USS Orizaba (ID-1536), later AP-24
- USS Panuco (ID-1533)
- USS Black Hawk (ID-1543)
- USS William Isom (ID-1555)
- USS St. Francis (ID-1557)
- USS George G. Henry (ID-1560), later AO-46
- USS Levisa (ID-1573)
- USS Berkshire (ID-1578)
- USS William D. Rockefeller (ID-1581)
- USS Matsonia (ID-1589)
- USS Norlina (ID-1597)
- USS Arcadia (ID-1605)
- USS Munsomo (ID-1607)
- USS Atik (ID-1608), not commissioned
- USS Herman Frasch (ID-1617)
- USS Sagua (ID-1627)
- USS Manchuria (ID-1633)
- USS Tiger (ID-1640)
- USS War Baron (ID-1641)
- USS Orion (ID-1650)
- USS Cambridge (ID-1651)
- USS Edward Luckenbach (ID-1662)
- USS Harrisburg (ID-1663)
- USS Pawnee (ID-1665)
- USS Yale (ID-1672), later IX-106
- USS Quinnebaug (ID-1687), minelayer
- USS Canandaigua (ID-1694), minelayer
- USS Roanoke (ID-1695), minelayer
- USS Canonicus (ID-1696), minelayer
- USS Housatonic (ID-1697), minelayer
- USS Saranac (ID-1702), minelayer
- USS Billow (ID-1704)
- USS Wave (ID-1706)
- USS Boothbay (ID-1708)
- USS Atlida (ID-1721)
- USS Anna O'Boyle (ID-1736)
- USS Sioux (ID-1766)
- USS Western Front (ID-1787)
- USS Lake Champlain (ID-1791)
- USS Lake Shore (ID-1792), later AG-45
- USS Wachusett (ID-1840)
- USS Rappahannock (ID-1854), later AF-6
- USS Amphion (ID-1888)
- USS Hisko (ID-1953)
- USS Casco (ID-1957)
- USS C. W. Morse (ID-1966)
- USS Ticonderoga (ID-1968)
- USS Samoset (ID-2000)
- USS Astoria (ID-2005), later AK-8
- USS Manta (ID-2036)
- USS Moosehead (ID-2047), later YFB-2047
- USS Munrio (ID-2054)
- USS Severance (ID-2063)
- USS Alsen (ID-2076)
- USS Munindies (ID-2093)
- USS William A. McKenney (ID-2102)
- USS Acme (ID-2103), later IX-131 as Abarenda
- USS Long Beach (ID-2136), later AK-9
- USS Black Hawk (ID-2140), later AD-9
- USS Hatteras (ID-2142)
- USS Sudbury (ID-2149)
- USS Sylvan Arrow (ID-2150)
- USS Lakeside (ID-2158)
- USS West Haven (ID-2159)
- USS F. J. Luckenbach (ID-2160)
- USS Wilhelmina (ID-2168)
- USS Bernard (ID-2174)
- USS Tanamo (ID-2176)
- USS Bavaria (ID-2179)
- USS Amabala (ID-2185)
- USS Lakeview (ID-2186)
- USS Artemis (ID-2187)
- USS Manhattan (ID-2195)
- USS Munaires (ID-2197)
- USS Bella (ID-2211)
- USS Muscatine (ID-2226)
- USS Evelyn (ID-2228), later AK-100
- USS Santiago (ID-2253)
- USS Felix Taussig (ID-2282)
- USS K. I. Luckenbach (ID-2291)
- USS American (ID-2292)
- USS Beaver (ID-2302), later AS-5
- USS Saetia (ID-2317), sank 9 November 1918 after mine strike, no fatalities
- USS Boston Floating Hospital (ID-2336)
- USS Herbert L. Pratt (ID-2339)
- USS Pontiac (ID-2343)
- USS Munplace (ID-2346)
- USS Winnebago (ID-2353)
- USS Westport (ID-2362)
- USS Bailey (ID-2370)
- USS Annie B. Embry (ID-2401)
- USS Julia Luckenbach (ID-2407)
- USS A. G. Prentiss (ID-2413)
- USS Fairmont (ID-2429)
- USS Blue Ridge (ID-2432)
- USS Ripple (ID-2439)
- USS Walter Hardcastle (ID-2464)
- USS Bivalve (ID-2472)
- USS Bali (ID-2483)
- USS Rondo (ID-2488)
- USS Spray (ID-2491)
- USS Foam (ID-2496)
- USS Maartensdijk (ID-2497)
- USS Merauke (ID-2498)
- USS Biesbosch (ID-2499)
- USS Zeelandia (ID-2507)
- USS Samarinda (ID-2511)
- USS Westerdijk (ID-2514)
- USS Veendijk (ID-2515)
- USS Mercurius (ID-2516)
- USS Absaroka (ID-2518)
- USS Wieldrecht (ID-2519)
- USS Chestnut Hill (ID-2526)
- USS Noord Brabant (ID-2535)
- USS Roepat (ID-2536)
- USS Randwijk (ID-2546)
- USS Lake Wood (ID-2555)
- USS Winterswijk (ID-2567)
- USS Clio (ID-2578)
- USS West Arrow (ID-2585)
- USS Oosterdijk (ID-2586)
- USS Barge No. 66 (ID-2604)
- USS Malang (ID-2623)
- USS Lake Tulare (ID-2652)
- USS Yellowstone (ID-2657)
- USS Barge No. 70 (ID-2678)
- USS Fenimore (ID-2681)
- USS Luella (ID-2691)
- USS Ternate (ID-2697)
- USS Koningen der Nederlanden (ID-2708)
- USS Rijnland (ID-2718)
- USS Zuiderdijk (ID-2724)
- USS Barge No. 62 (ID-2729)
- USS Zaanland (ID-2746), sank in collision 12 May 1918, no fatalities
- USS West Lianga (ID-2758)
- USS Sixaloa (ID-2777)
- USS Lake Traverse (ID-2782)
- USS Tjisondari (ID-2783)
- USS Ophir (ID-2800), CTL from fire November 1918, 2 killed
- USS West Wood (ID-2812)
- USS Oakland (ID-2847)
- USS Westover (ID-2867), torpedoed 11 July 1918, 11 killed
- USS Santa Ana (ID-2869), later AP-36
- USS Bie & Schiott (ID-2871)
- USS West Bridge (ID-2888)
- USS Westerner (ID-2890)
- USS Lake Weston (ID-2926)
- USS Pasadena (ID-2943)
- USS Lancaster (ID-2953)
- USS Barge No. 72 (ID-2986)
- USS Peter H. Crowell (ID-2987)
- USS Lake Superior (ID-2995), later AG-46
- USS Lake Tahoe (ID-2996)
- USS Lake Worth (ID-2997)
- USS Pequot (ID-2998)
- USS Siboney (ID-2999)
- USS Topila (ID-3001)
- USS Iowan (ID-3002)
- USS Kaiser Wilhelm II (ID-3004)
- USS Grosser Kurfürst (ID-3005)
- USS America (ID-3006)
- USS Antigone (ID-3007)
- USS Beaufort (ID-3008), later AK-6
- USS Bridgeport (ID-3009), later AR-2
- USS DeKalb (ID-3010)
- USS Madawaska (ID-3011), later AP-29
- USS Barbarossa (ID-3012)
- USS President Grant (ID-3014), later AP-33
- USS Savannah (ID-3015), later AS-8
- USS Von Steuben (ID-3017)
- USS George Washington (ID-3018), later AP-19
- USS Katrina Luckenbach (ID-3020)
- USS Radnor (ID-3023)
- USS Freedom (ID-3024)
- USS Old Dominion (ID-3025)
- USS Solitaire (ID-3026)
- USS C. F. Sargent (ID-3027)
- USS Barge No. 76 (ID-3030)
- USS Alaska (ID-3035)
- USS Cape Henry (ID-3056)
- USS Advance (ID-3057), later YT-28
- USS Robert L. Barnes (ID-3088), later AK-22, AO-14, AG-27
- USS Vittorio Emmanuel III (ID-3095)
- USS Westward Ho (ID-3098)
- USS West Zula (ID-3105)
- USS West Alsek (ID-3119)
- USS West Indian (ID-3120)
- USS Westchester (ID-3122)
- USS Liberator (ID-3134)
- USS Beukelsdijk (ID-3135)
- USS Chebaulip (ID-3141)
- USS Camden (ID-3143), later AS-6
- USS Aniwa (ID-3146)
- USS Wakulla (ID-3147)
- USS Sara Thompson (ID-3148), later AO-8
- USS Western Ocean (ID-3151)
- USS Western Sea (ID-3153)
- USS Robert H. McCurdy (ID-3157)
- USS Western Chief (ID-3161)
- USS Western Spirit (ID-3164)
- USS Barge No. 84 (ID-3168)
- USS West Shore (ID-3170)
- USS Walter A. Luckenbach (ID-3171)
- USS Westford (ID-3198)
- USS West Mount (ID-3202)
- USS West Gate (ID-3216), sank in collision 7 October 1918, 7 killed
- USS West Gambo (ID-3220)
- USS West Apaum (ID-3221)
- USS Addie and Carrie (ID-3226)
- USS Wassaic (ID-3230)
- USS Charles Whittemore (ID-3232)
- USS Volunteer (ID-3242)
- USS West Cohas (ID-3253)
- USS West Point (ID-3254)
- USS Atlantic (ID-3268), later YFB-3268
- USS Ohioan (ID-3280)
- USS Panaman (ID-3299)
- USS Western Light (ID-3300)
- USS Macona (ID-3305)
- USS El Occidente (ID-3307)
- USS Sagadahoc (ID-3311)
- USS West Ekonk (ID-3313)
- USS West Coast (ID-3315)
- USS Robert M. Thompson (ID-3319)
- USS West Gotomska (ID-3322)
- USS West Galeta (ID-3330)
- USS West Hobomac (ID-3335)
- USS Eastport (ID-3342)
- USS Mojave (ID-3353)
- USS Barge No. 6 (ID-3373)
- USS Winding Gulf (ID-3379)
- USS Eastern Chief (ID-3390)
- USS Manna Hata (ID-3396)
- USS Point Lobos (ID-3404)
- USS Eastern Queen (ID-3406)
- USS Zirkel (ID-3407)
- USS Soestdijk (ID-3413)
- USS Salvor (ID-3418)
- USS Arabia (ID-3434)
- USS Ozaukee (ID-3439)
- USS W. L. Steed (ID-3449)
- USS Liberty (ID-3461), later AK-35
- USS Point Bonita (ID-3496), later AG-42
- USS Montclair (ID-3497)
- USS Eastern Shore (ID-3500)
- USS Captain Dud (ID-3507), later YD-43
- USS Scranton (ID-3511)
- USS Naiwa (ID-3512)
- USS M. J. Scanlon (ID-3513)
- USS Victorious (ID-3514), later AP-13
- USS Nantahala (ID-3519)
- USS Lydia (ID-3524)
- USS Eastern Light (ID-3538)
- USS Westport (ID-3548)
- USS Willimantic (ID-3549)
- USS West Mead (ID-3550)
- USS Western Belle (ID-3551)
- USS Bellingham (ID-3552)
- USS Berwyn (ID-3565)
- USS Lake Catherine (ID-3568), later AG-36
- USS Western Comet (ID-3569)
- USS Morristown (ID-3580)
- USS Neponset (ID-3581)
- USS Rogday (ID-3583)
- USS West Zucker (ID-3584)
- USS West Madaket (ID-3636)
- USS West Loquassuck (ID-3638)
- USS Federal (ID-3657)
- USS West Elcasco (ID-3661), later AK-33
- USS Calamares (ID-3662), later AF-18
- USS South Pole (ID-3665)
- USS Polar Bear (ID-3666)
- USS Westpool (ID-3675)
- USS West Mahomet (ID-3681)
- USS West Hosokie (ID-3695)
- USS Edenton (ID-3696), later AK-38
- USS West Lashaway (ID-3700)
- USS Western Maid (ID-3703)
- USS West Eldara (ID-3704)
- USS West Kyska (ID-3709)
- USS Western Plains (ID-3741)
- USS Phoenix Bridge (ID-3767)
- USS Western Hope (ID-3771)
- USS Fort Wayne (ID-3786)
- USS North Pole (ID-3791)
- USS Zaca (ID-3792)
- USS West Grama (ID-3794)
- USS Oskawa (ID-3797)
- USS Oskaloosa (ID-3800)
- USS West Zeda (ID-3801)
- USS Santa Teresa (ID-3804), later AP-28
- USS Yamhill (ID-3806), later AF-7
- USS West Carnifax (ID-3812)
- USS West Cressey (ID-3813)
- USS Western Ally (ID-3815)
- USS Buford (ID-3818)
- USS Saccarappa (ID-3828)
- USS West Cobalt (ID-3836)
- USS Mercer (ID-3837)
- USS West Wauna (ID-3856)
- USS Sac City (ID-3861)
- USS West Avenal (ID-3871)
- USS Floridian (ID-3875)
- USS Wathena (ID-3884)
- USS West Elcajon (ID-3907)
- USS West Compo (ID-3912)
- USS Black Arrow (ID-3913)
- USS Marne (ID-3929)
- USS Mariana (ID-3944)
- USS Lake Yahara (ID-3974)
- USS Kaiserin Auguste Victoria (ID-3983)
- USS West Conob (ID-4033)
- USS Graf Waldersee (ID-4040)
- USS New Windsor (ID-4050)
- USS Imperator (ID-4080)
- USS Lake Ypsilanti (ID-4114)
- USS Edisto (ID-4146)
- USS Western Star (ID-4210)
- USS Lake Pepin (ID-4215)
- USS Lake Geneva (ID-4215B), later AG-37
- USS Lake Helen (ID-4215E)
- USS Capella (ID-4253W)
- USS Lake St. Regis (ID-4261)
- USS Watonwan (ID-4296)
- USS Newton (ID-4306), later IX-33
- USS Moldegaard (ID-4324)
- USS Lake Otisco (ID-4410D)
- USS Lake Wimico (ID-4410G)
- USS Santa Leonora (ID-4352A), later AS-9 as Canopus
- USS Munwood (ID-4460)
- USS Teresa (ID-4478)
- USS West Lewark (ID-4490), later AK-34
- USS Mount Vernon (ID-4508)
- USS Tivives (ID-4521)
- USS Santa Barbara (ID-4522)
- USS Stephen R. Jones (ID-4526)
- USS Pastores (ID-4540), later AF-16
- USS Alaskan (ID-4542)
- USS Arizonan (ID-4542-A)
- USS Finland (ID-4543)
- USS Minnesotan (ID-4545)

=== Section patrol (SP) ===
- USS Arawan II (SP-1)
- USS Lynx (SP-2)
- USS Patrol No. 4 (SP-8)
- USS Mystery (SP-16)
- USS Mauna Loa (SP-28)
- USS Patrol No. 5 (SP-29)
- USS Patrol No. 7 (SP-31)
- USS Mustang (SP-36)
- USS Atlantis (SP-40)
- USS Patrol No. 6 (SP-54)
- USS Gypsy (SP-55), destroyed in fire 20 June 1917 while fitting out
- USS Patrol No. 8 (SP-56)
- USS Rivalen (SP-63)
- USS Joyance (SP-72)
- USS Rutoma (SP-78)
- USS Sturdy (SP-82)
- USS Patrol No. 10 (SP-85)
- USS Perfecto (SP-86)
- USS Simplicity (SP-96), destroyed in collision 19 October 1918
- USS Kumigan (SP-97)
- USS Dean II (SP-98)
- USS Marie (SP-100)
- USS Panama (SP-101)
- USS Raven III (SP-103)
- USS Sybilla III (SP-104), later PC-454, PYc-46
- USS Riette (SP-107)
- USS Calabash (SP-108)
- USS Elmasada (SP-109)
- USS Bab (SP-116)
- USS Mohican (SP-117)
- USS Mira (SP-118)
- USS Tarantula (SP-124), sunk in collision 28 October 1918
- USS Ono (SP-128)
- USS Kanawha II (SP-130)
- USS Noma (SP-131)
- USS Wanderer (SP-132)
- USS Sultana (SP-134)
- USS Aphrodite (SP-135)
- USS Niagara (SP-136), later PY-9
- USS Hoqua (SP-142)
- USS Miss Betsy (SP-151)
- USS Lady Anne (SP-154)
- USS Me-Too (SP-155)
- USS Winchester (SP-156)
- USS Corsair (SP-159), later AGS-3
- USS Narada (SP-161)
- USS Christabel (SP-162)
- USS Vedette (SP-163)
- USS May (SP-164), wrecked 28 February 1920
- USS Alcedo (SP-166), torpedoed 5 November 1917, 21 killed
- USS Kanawha (SP-169)
- USS Sovereign (SP-170)
- USS Quest (SP-171)
- USS Meline (SP-175)
- USS Privateer (SP-179), later YP-179
- USS Sentinel (SP-180)
- USS Arcturus (SP-182)
- USS Hiawatha (SP-183)
- USS Gladiola (SP-184)
- USS Aeolus (SP-186)
- USS Hopestill (SP-191)
- USS Sachem (SP-192), later PYc-25
- USS Marguerite (SP-193)
- USS Coronet (SP-194)
- USS Edith M. III (SP-196)
- USS Reposo II (SP-198)
- USS Karibou (SP-200)
- USS Minnemac II (SP-202)
- USS Alacrity (SP-206)
- USS Volunteer (SP-207)
- USS Abalone (SP-208)
- USS Harvard (SP-209)
- USS Helenita (SP-210)
- USS Rambler (SP-211)
- USS Lady Mary (SP-212)
- USS Sabot (SP-213)
- USS Edithia (SP-214), later YP-214
- USS Hyac (SP-216)
- USS Althea (SP-218)
- USS Killarney (SP-219)
- USS Katherine K. (SP-220), wrecked 9–10 September 1919
- USS Sabalo (SP-225)
- USS Pirate (SP-229)
- USS SP-237
- USS Lannai (SP-242)
- USS Niagara (SP-246)
- USS Fulton (SP-247)
- USS Adroit (SP-248)
- USS Hauoli (SP-249), assigned to Thomas Edison for antisubmarine research
- USS Wistaria (SP-259)
- USS Manito II (SP-262)
- USS Niagara (SP-263)
- USS S. T. Co. No. 2 (SP-267)
- USS Almax II (SP-268)
- USS Idalis (SP-270)
- USS Caliph (SP-272)
- USS Ellen (SP-284)
- USS Mary Pope (SP-291)
- USS Glendoveer (SP-292)
- USS Navajo III (SP-298)
- USS Sans Souci II (SP-301)
- USS Spray II (SP-308)
- USS Mikawe (SP-309)
- USS Raboco (SP-310)
- USS Onward (SP-311)
- USS G. H. McNeal (SP-312)
- USS Aloha (SP-317)
- USS Joseph F. Bellows (SP-323)
- USS A. Brook Taylor (SP-326)
- USS Margaret (SP-328)
- USS Crest (SP-339)
- USS Whitecap (SP-340)
- USS Aurora (SP-345)
- USS Alice (SP-367)
- USS Absegami (SP-371)
- USS P. K. Bauman (SP-377), wrecked 12 January 1918
- USS City of Lewes (SP-383)
- USS Rehoboth (SP-384), foundered 4 October 1917
- USS Kajeruna (SP-389)
- USS Montauk (SP-392), wrecked 21 August 1918, 7 killed
- USS Mary Alice (SP-397), sunk in collision 5 October 1918, no fatalities
- USS Legonia II (SP-399)
- USS Susanne (SP-411)
- USS Marija (SP-413)
- USS Kemah (SP-415)
- USS B. H. B. Hubbard (SP-416)
- USS Aramis (SP-418), later PY-7
- USS Gretchen (SP-423)
- USS Nemes (SP-424), sank after internal explosion 21 August 1917, no fatalities
- USS Minerva (SP-425)
- USS Sequoyah (SP-426)
- USS Seneca (SP-427)
- USS James (SP-429), foundered 28 April 1919, no fatalities
- USS Gypsum Queen (SP-430), wrecked 28 April 1919, 15 killed
- USS Venetia (SP-431)
- USS Oneida (SP-432)
- USS Jassamine (SP-438)
- USS Kanised (SP-439)
- USS Pinafore (SP-450)
- USS Audwin (SP-451)
- USS Ameera (SP-453)
- USS Anado (SP-455)
- USS Aurore II (SP-460)
- USS Mary (SP-462)
- USS Yo Ho (SP-463)
- USS Blue Bird (SP-465)
- USS St. Sebastian (SP-470), wrecked 9 September 1919
- USS Knickerbocker (SP-479)
- USS Babette II (SP-484)
- USS John B. Hinton (SP-485)
- USS Machigonne (SP-507)
- USS Raazoo (SP-508)
- USS Alert (SP-511)
- USS Guinevere (SP-512), wrecked 26 January 1918, no fatalities
- USS Actus (SP-516)
- USS Naushon (SP-517)
- USS Surf (SP-518)
- USS Lu-O-La (SP-520)
- USS Isabel (SP-521), later PY-10
- USS Charles Mann (SP-522)
- USS Nightingale (SP-523)
- USS Margaret (SP-524)
- USS Margaret (SP-527)
- USS Kestrel II (SP-529)
- USS Anderton (SP-530)
- USS Margaret (SP-531)
- USS Paloma (SP-533)
- USS Estella (SP-537)
- USS Content (SP-538)
- USS Bonita (SP-540), sunk in collision 26 November 1918
- USS Admiral (SP-541)
- USS Sialia (SP-543), later PY-15
- USS Idaho (SP-545)
- USS Wachusetts (SP-548)
- USS Astrea (SP-560)
- USS Empress (SP-569), foundered 4 November 1917
- USS Natick (SP-570)
- USS Long Island (SP-572)
- USS Cythera (SP-575), later PY-26
- USS Arcady (SP-577)
- USS Get There (SP-579)
- USS Halcyon II (SP-582)
- USS Helianthus (SP-585)
- USS Alpha (SP-586)
- USS Raeo (SP-588)
- USS Aztec (SP-590)
- USS Arcturus (SP-593)
- USS Pete (SP-596)
- USS Akbar (SP-599)
- USS R. W. Wilmot (SP-604)
- USS Skink (SP-605)
- USS Nokomis (SP-609), later PY-6
- USS Dohema Jr. (SP-612)
- USS Saxis (SP-615), wrecked 7 July 1917
- USS Yacona (SP-617)
- USS Viking (SP-618)
- USS Castro (SP-621)
- USS Betty M. II (SP-623)
- USS Edithena (SP-624), later YP-200
- USS Cobra (SP-626)
- USS Alcalda (SP-630)
- USS Joy (SP-643)
- USS Shrimp (SP-645)
- USS California (SP-647)
- USS Needle (SP-649)
- USS Atlantic II (SP-651)
- USS Hippocampus (SP-654)
- USS Katie (SP-660)
- USS Lady Betty (SP-661)
- USS Politesse (SP-662)
- USS Celertias (SP-665)
- USS Parthenia (SP-671)
- USS Miramar
- USS Ardent (SP-680)
- USS Mary B. Garner (SP-682)
- USS McKeever Brothers (SP-683)
- USS Satilla (SP-687)
- USS Uncas (SP-689)
- USS Jaydee III (SP-692)
- USS Amagansett (SP-693)
- USS Annie E. Gallup (SP-694), wrecked 21 February 1918, no fatalities
- USS Pawnee (SP-699)
- USS Caprice (SP-703)
- USS Lexington II (SP-705)
- USS Nirvana (SP-706)
- USS Elsie III (SP-708)
- USS Sapphire (SP-710)
- USS Kiowa (SP-711)
- USS Rush (SP-712), wrecked 8 December 1917, no fatalities
- USS Galatea (SP-714), later YP-714
- USS Katherine (SP-715)
- USS Linta (SP-721)
- USS Calumet (SP-723)
- USS Orca (SP-726)
- USS Seven (SP-727)
- USS Apache (SP-729)
- USS Lynx II (SP-730)
- USS Letter B (SP-732)
- USS Malay (SP-735)
- USS Marold (SP-737)
- USS See W. See (SP-740)
- USS Vision (SP-744)
- USS Express No. 4 (SP-745)
- USS Estelle (SP-747)
- USS Albacore (SP-751)
- USS Adelante (SP-765)
- USS Concord (SP-773), later YT-33
- USS Sea Otter (SP-781)
- USS Whistler (SP-784)
- USS Enterprise (SP-790)
- USS Itasca (SP-810)
- USS Carola IV (SP-812)
- USS Corona (SP-813)
- USS Sister (SP-822)
- USS Eugene F. Price (SP-839)
- USS Barracuda (SP-845)
- USS Menhaden (SP-847)
- USS Arcadia (SP-856)
- USS Atlantic (SP-859)
- USS James River (SP-861)
- USS J. Reynor & Son (SP-869)
- USS Margo (SP-870)
- USS Lykens (SP-876), later AT-56
- USS Jimetta (SP-878)
- USS Marguerite II (SP-892)
- USS SP-912
- USS Josephine (SP-913)
- USS Little Brothers (SP-921)
- USS Osprey II (SP-928)
- USS Maysie (SP-930)
- USS Teaser (SP-933), burned and sank 27 December 1918
- USS Corinthia (SP-938)
- USS Augusta (SP-946)
- USS High Ball (SP-947)
- USS Itty E (SP-952), burned July 1918
- USS Tide (SP-953)
- USS Terrier (SP-960)
- USS Lady Thorne (SP-962)
- USS Bagheera (SP-963)
- USS Elfin (SP-965)
- USS Hebe (SP-966)
- USS Admiral (SP-967)
- USS Elizabeth (SP-972)
- USS Verdi (SP-979)
- USS Penobscot (SP-982), later YT-42, YTB-42
- USS Elfrida (SP-988)
- USS San Toy II (SP-996)
- USS Albatross (SP-1003)
- USS Qui Vive (SP-1004)
- USS Natalie Mae (SP-1005)
- USS Maud (SP-1009)
- USS Yarrow (SP-1010)
- USS Geraldine (SP-1011)
- USS Satellite (SP-1012)
- USS Sea Rover (SP-1014), later AT-57
- USS Challenge (SP-1015), later AT-59, YT-126, YTM-126
- USS Talofa (SP-1016)
- USS Jolly Roger (SP-1031), damaged beyond repair 6 November 1918 while being loaded on board the oiler USS Kanawha
- USS Isabela (SP-1035)
- USS Alameda (SP-1040)
- USS Machigonne (SP-1043)
- USS Arval (SP-1045)
- USS Nomad (SP-1046)
- USS Roamer (SP-1047)
- USS Pollyanna (SP-1048)
- USS Albert Brown (SP-1050)
- USS Ensign (SP-1051)
- USS Alabama (SP-1052)
- USS Tech III (SP-1055)
- USS Thistle (SP-1058)
- USS Doloma (SP-1062)
- USS Peggy (SP-1072)
- USS Melville (SP-1078)
- USS Marjorie M. (SP-1080)
- USS Regis II (SP-1083)
- USS Anton Dohrn (SP-1086)
- USS Elizabeth (SP-1092)
- USS Cherokee (SP-1104)
- USS Sayona II (SP-1109)
- USS Vision (SP-1114)
- USS Monocacy (SP-1116), later AT-55, scuttled 5 May 1942 at Corregidor
- USS Conestoga (SP-1128), later AT-54, disappeared June 1921, 56 killed
- USS Mariner (SP-1136), foundered 26 February 1918, no fatalities
- USS Katrina (SP-1144)
- USS Barnett (SP-1149)
- USS Hetman (SP-1150)
- USS Russ (SP-1151)
- USS Arctic (SP-1158)
- USS Narragansett (SP-1163)
- USS Atlantic (SP-1182)
- USS Jane II (SP-1188)
- USS Cero (SP-1189), burned and sank 21 October 1918, no fatalities
- USS Rhebal (SP-1195)
- USS Maggie (SP-1202)
- USS Margaret Anderson (SP-1203)
- USS Pilgrim (SP-1204)
- USS Annabelle (SP-1206)
- USS Ellen (SP-1209)
- USS Lucille Ross (SP-1211)
- USS Inca (SP-1212)
- USS Montauk (SP-1213)
- USS Harvest Queen (SP-1215)
- USS Herreshoff No. 309 (SP-1218)
- USS Acoma (SP-1228)
- USS Liberty III (SP-1229)
- USS Louise No. 2 (SP-1230)
- USS Kwasind (SP-1233)
- USS Cigarette (SP-1234)
- USS General Knox (SP-1237)
- USS Seneca (SP-1240)
- USS Protector (SP-1242)
- USS Josephine (SP-1243)
- USS Joseph M. Clark (SP-1244)
- USS Nahant (SP-1250)
- USS Velocipede (SP-1258)
- USS Grayling (SP-1259)
- USS Marie (SP-1260)
- USS Bouker No. 2 (SP-1275), later YT-30
- USS J. M. Guffey (SP-1279)
- USS Kangaroo (SP-1284)
- USS Daiquiri (SP-1285)
- USS Anemone IV (SP-1290)
- USS Snark (SP-1291)
- USS Helen Baughman (SP-1292)
- USS Howick Hall (SP-1303)
- USS Resolute (SP-1309)
- USS Jeanette Skinner (SP-1321)
- USS Kerlew (SP-1325)
- USS Governor R. M. McLane (SP-1328)
- USS San Juan (SP-1352)
- USS A-1 (SP-1370)
- SP-1385, later ID-1385
- USS El Capitan (SP-1407)
- USS Eliza Hayward (SP-1414)
- USS Commodore (SP-1425)
- USS Sappho (SP-1427)
- USS Alameda (SP-1432)
- USS Swan (SP-1437) (Not used)
- USS Nellie Jackson (SP-1459)
- USS Kermanshah (SP-1473)
- USS Keresaspa (SP-1484)
- USS Lillie B (SP-1502)
- USS Vesta (SP-1506)
- USS Bobylu (SP-1513)
- USS Cauto (SP-1538)
- USS Kroonland (SP-1541)
- USS Kentuckian (SP-1544)
- USS Hilton (SP-1574)
- USS Santa Paula (SP-1590)
- USS Eurana (SP-1594)
- USS Frank H. Buck (SP-1613)
- USS Pleiades (SP-1616)
- USS Frieda (SP-1618)
- USS Ausable (SP-1631)
- USS Peerless (SP-1639)
- USS Choctaw (SP-1648)
- USS Gargoyle (SP-1656)
- USS Halcyon (SP-1658)
- USS Minneopa (SP-1701)
- USS Miss Toledo (SP-1711)
- USS Bessie (SP-1755)
- USS Dochra (SP-1758)
- USS Tech Jr. (SP-1761)
- USS Lake Placid (SP-1788)
- USS Akela (SP-1793)
- USS War Bug (SP-1795)
- USS Keresan (SP-1806)
- USS Wabash (SP-1824)
- USS Herreshoff No. 306 (SP-1841)
- USS Kiowa (SP-1842)
- USS Houma (SP-1843)
- USS Isle of Surry (SP-1860)
- USS Bessie J. (SP-1919)
- USS Undaunted (SP-1950)
- USS Chinampa (SP-1952)
- USS Joanna (SP-1963), unaccounted for abroad
- USS Bath (SP-1997)
- USS Progressive (SP-2003)
- USS Laura Reed (SP-2009)
- USS Satsuma (SP-2038)
- USS Raymond (SP-2065)
- USS Glen White (SP-2068)
- USS Pensacola (SP-2078)
- USS Margin (SP-2119)
- USS Lake Huron (SP-2144)
- USS Gorgona (SP-2164)
- USS Relief (SP-2170)
- USS Atlas (SP-2171)
- USS Lake Moor (SP-2180)
- USS Lake Erie (SP-2190)
- USS Narragansett (SP-2196)
- USS Democracy (SP-2215)
- USS Constantia (SP-2217)
- USS Herreshoff No. 308 (SP-2232)
- USS Herreshoff No. 321 (SP-2235), sank under tow 7 October 1921
- USS San Juan (SP-2262)
- USS Pocomoke (SP-2265)
- USS General Putnam (SP-2284)
- USS Jack Scully (SP-2289)
- USS Princess Matioka (SP-2290)
- USS Alexander H. Erickson (SP-2298)
- USS Herman S. Caswell (SP-2311)
- USS Merchant (SP-2313)
- USS Waban (SP-2355)
- USS Postmaster General (SP-2364)
- USS Sea Hawk (SP-2365)
- USS Herreshoff No. 322 (SP-2373)
- USS John G. Olsen (SP-2377)
- USS Wanderer (SP-2440)
- USS Elinor (SP-2465)
- USS Bussum (SP-2468)
- USS S. M. Goucher (SP-2487)
- USS Rijndam (SP-2505)
- USS Margaret (SP-2510)
- USS Lake Crescent (SP-2557)
- USS Hydraulic (SP-2584)
- USS Ahdeek (SP-2589)
- USS Bayocean (SP-2640)
- USS Avenger (SP-2646)
- USS Celebes (SP-2680)
- USS Gorontalo (SP-2682)
- USS John M. Connelly (SP-2703)
- USS Alexander Brown (SP-2725), later YT-31
- USS Clare (SP-2774)
- USS Dretcherland (SP-2793)
- USS Jan Van Nassau (SP-2805)
- USS Herreshoff No. 323 (SP-2840)
- USS Howard C. Moore (SP-2872)
- USS Santa Luisa (SP-2873)
- USS Barge No. 8 (SP-2876)
- USS Lake St. Clair (SP-2904)
- USS Lake Pewaukee (SP-2906)
- USS Lake Arthur (SP-2915)
- USS Lake Elizabeth (SP-2957)
- USS Gulfport (SP-2989), later AK-5
- USS Lake Bridge (SP-2990)
- USS Lake Forest (SP-2991)
- USS Lake Michigan (SP-2993)
- USS Lakeport (SP-2994)
- USS Resolute (SP-3003)
- USS Gold Shell (SP-3021)
- USS Amphitrate (SP-3028)
- USS Ibis (SP-3051)
- USS Gratitude (SP-3054)
- USS Fresno (SP-3063)
- USS Josephus (SP-3065)
- USS Rosedale (SP-3079)
- USS Helvetia (SP-3096)
- USS Westchester (SP-3103)
- USS Asher J. Hudson (SP-3104)
- USS Rod (SP-3114)
- USS Santa Olivia (SP-3125)
- USS Santa Malta (SP-3125-A)
- USS Griswold (SP-3138)
- USS Alloway (SP-3139)
- USS Camden (SP-3143)
- USS Ice King (SP-3160)
- USS Hurst (SP-3196)
- USS Rescue (SP-3209)
- USS Resolute (SP-3218)
- USS Katherine W. Cullen (SP-3223)
- USS Sparrow II (SP-3231)
- USS Lagoda (SP-3250)
- USS Severn (SP-3273)
- USS Mary M (SP-3274)
- USS Hawaiian (SP-3277)
- USS Myrtle (SP-3289)
- USS Hopkins (SP-3294)
- USS Josephine (SP-3295)
- USS Sagamore (SP-3296)
- USS Polar Sea (SP-3301)
- USS San Juan (SP-3306)
- USS Plymouth (SP-3308)
- USS Defiance (SP-3327)
- USS Easterner (SP-3331)
- USS Sherman (SP-3345)
- USS Isanti (SP-3423)
- USS Betty Jane I (SP-3458)
- USS Liberty (SP-3461)
- USS Edith (SP-3469)
- USS Hickman (SP-3554)
- USS Lake Blanchester (SP-3597-C)
- USS Challenger (SP-3630)
- USS Major Wheeler (SP-3637)
- USS Polar Land (SP-3651)
- USS Invincible (SP-3671)
- USS Independence (SP-3676), later AP-16, APA-9
- USS Cohasset (SP-3679)
- USS Edenton (SP-3696)
- USS McDougall (SP-3717)
- USS West Humhaw (SP-3718)
- USS Lake Larga (SP-3765A)
- USS Lake Elsinore (SP-3765B)
- USS Lake Gedney (SP-3765C)
- USS Polar Star (SP-3787)
- USS Piave (SP-3799)
- USS Banago (SP-3810)
- USS Kamesit (SP-3829)
- USS Edward L. Dohney III (SP-3835)
- USS Auburn (SP-3842)
- USS Edgecombe (SP-3894)
- USS Lake Gaspar (SP-4086)
- USS Lake Dymer (SP-4131)
- USS Lake Mary (SP-4269)
- USS Lake Berdan (SP-4276C)
- USS Lake Conesus (SP-4331)
- USS Hoxbar (SP-4341)
- USS Hoven (SP-4341B)
- USS Lake Capens (SP-4358)
- USS Lake Charlotte (SP-4394)
- USS Lake Frances (SP-4406)
- USS Lake Gakona (SP-4409A)
- USS Lake Fern Wood (SP-4410)
- USS Lake Harney (SP-4410E)
- USS Lake Lillian (SP-4410F)
- USS Lake Daraga (SP-4428)
- USS Lake Pleasant (SP-4429)
- USS Lake Harris (SP-4429A)
- USS Baxley (SP-4449)
- USS Agwidale (SP-4464)
- USS El Oriente (SP-4504)
- USS El Sol (SP-4505)
- USS Santa Clara (SP-4523)
- USS Alaskan (SP-4542)
- USS Edgar F. Luckenbach (SP-4697)

== See also ==
- List of mine warfare vessels of the United States Navy § Converted steamships and freighters (ID)
- List of United States Navy ships
