= USS Sapphire (SP-710) =

Patrol vessel of the United States Navy

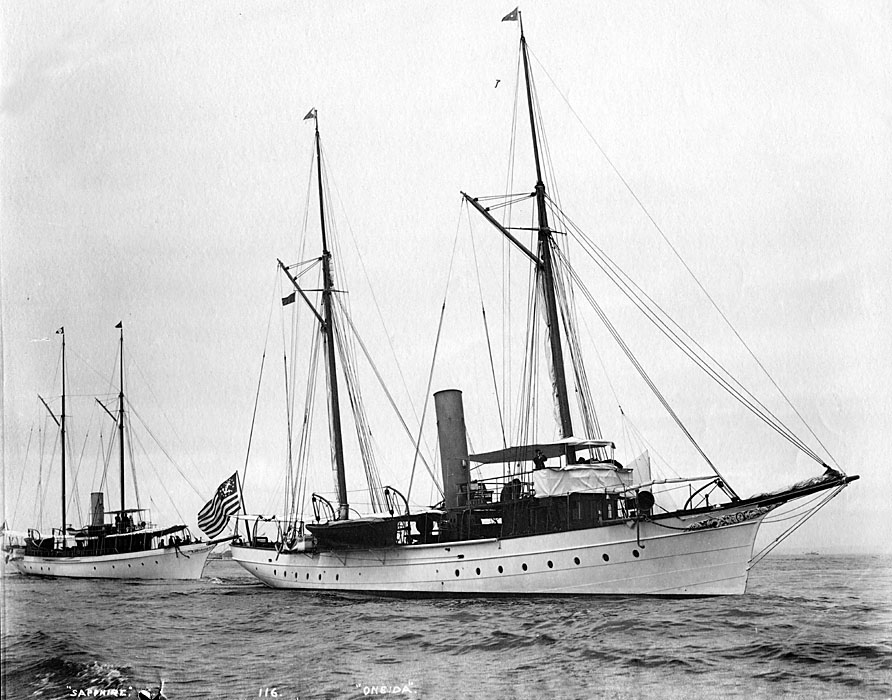
- Sapphire (left), astern of the yacht Oneida (right)

History

United States
- Name: USS Sapphire
- Namesake: Previous name retained
- Builder: Herreshoff Manufacturing Company, Bristol, Rhode Island
- Completed: 1900
- Acquired: 8 June 1917
- Commissioned: 14 September 1917
- Decommissioned: 16 December 1918
- Fate: Returned to owner 16 December 1918
- Notes: Operated as private yacht Sapphire 1900–17 and from 1918

General characteristics
- Type: Patrol vessel
- Tonnage: 53 Gross register tons
- Length: 98 ft (30 m)
- Beam: 14 ft (4.3 m)
- Draft: 5 ft 9 in (1.75 m)
- Propulsion: steam engine, single screw
- Sail plan: two masts, gaff rig
- Speed: 10 knots (19 km/h)
- Complement: 19
- Armament: 1 × 6-pounder gun; 1 × .30-caliber (7.62-mm) machine gun

USS Sapphire (SP-710) was a United States Navy patrol vessel in commission from 1917 to 1918.

Sapphire was built as a small, private, wooden-hulled steam yacht of the same name in 1900 by the Herreshoff Manufacturing Company at Bristol, Rhode Island. On 8 June 1917, her owner, Jeremiah Milbank of New York City, enrolled her in the Naval Coast Defense Reserve and the US Navy ordered her into service for use as a section patrol boat during World War I. She was commissioned as USS Sapphire (SP-710) on 14 September 1917 at Brooklyn, New York.

After fitting out for naval service at Tebo's Yacht Basin, Sapphire joined the section patrol in the 3rd Naval District on 14 July 1918. For the rest of World War I, she patrolled the waters off Execution Light, alternating with or joining the patrol vessels USS Sturdy, USS Jimetta, and USS Josephine. She ceased active service on 20 November 1918, and was transferred from Section Base No. 7 to New York Harbor on 10 December 1918.

The patrol vessel USS Minerva towed Sapphire to Robert Jacob's shipyard at City Island in the Bronx, New York, on 16 December 1918. She was decommissioned there and returned to Milbank that day.
