= USS Vision =

USS Vision has been the name of more than one United States Navy ship, and may refer to:

- USS Vision (SP-744), later USS SP-744, a patrol boat in commission from 1917 to 1919
- USS Vision (SP-1114), a patrol boat in commission from 1917 to 1918
