= USS Augusta =

Six vessels of the United States Navy have been named Augusta. The first two, as well as the fourth, were named after the city of Augusta, Georgia, while the fifth and sixth after Augusta, Maine. The third, (SP-946) has not yet been determined which city she was named for.

- USS Augusta (1799), was a 14-gun brig in use from 1799 to 1801.
- USS Augusta (1853), was built in 1853, purchased by the Navy in 1861 and sold in 1868.
- USS Augusta (SP-946), was a wooden-hulled steam yacht, acquired by the Navy in 1917 and returned to her original owner in 1918.
- USS Augusta (CA-31), was in service from 1931 to 1946.
- USS Augusta (SSN-710), was a Los Angeles-class nuclear attack submarine, commissioned in 1985 and decommissioned in 2008.
- USS Augusta (LCS-34), an Independence-class littoral combat ship, commissioned in 2023 and currently in active service.
