= USS McNeal =

USS McNeal may refer to the following ships of the United States Navy:

- USS G. H. McNeal (SP-312), a United States Navy minesweeper in commission from 1917 to 1919
- USS Kenneth L. McNeal (SP-333), a United States Navy minesweeper in commission from 1917 to 1919

== See also ==
- USS George M. Neal (DDG-131)
