= Atglen =

Atglen may refer to:

== Places ==
- Atglen, Pennsylvania, a borough in Chester County, Pennsylvania, in the United States

== ships ==
- USS Atglen (ID-1315), also listed as ID-1350, a United States Navy barge in commission from 1917 to 1919
