= USS Volunteer (SP-207) =

Patrol vessel of the United States Navy

History

United States
- Name: USS Volunteer (proposed)
- Namesake: Previous name retained
- Completed: 1906
- Acquired: Never
- Notes: Civilian motorboat inspected for service in 1918

General characteristics
- Type: Patrol vessel (proposed)

USS Volunteer (SP-207) was the proposed name and designation of a civilian motorboat considered for United States Navy service as a patrol vessel in World War I but never acquired by the Navy.

Volunteer was a wooden-hulled motorboat built in 1906 at East Boothbay, Maine. The U.S. Navy inspected her during the summer of 1918 for possible World War I duty as a patrol vessel with the section patrol, and she was assigned the section patrol boat number SP-207. However, the Navy apparently never acquired her.

The 1918 Naval Vessel Register listed Volunteer as a "water boat" and indicated that she was commissioned in the Navy on 23 August 1918. However, that information is probably erroneous for two reasons. First, the 1919 edition of the Naval Vessel Register indicated that she was "not taken over," and she is not listed in the lists of vessels assigned to naval districts found in the 1918 and 1919 issues of the Navy Directory. Second, there was another USS Volunteer (ID-3242) during World War I, a collier which served in the Naval Overseas Transportation Service in 1918 and 1919 and was commissioned on 23 August 1918. It seems likely that the compilers of the 1918 Naval Vessel Register confused the two ships and that Volunteer (SP-207) never saw service with the Navy.
