= USS Surf (SP-518) =

Steam yacht

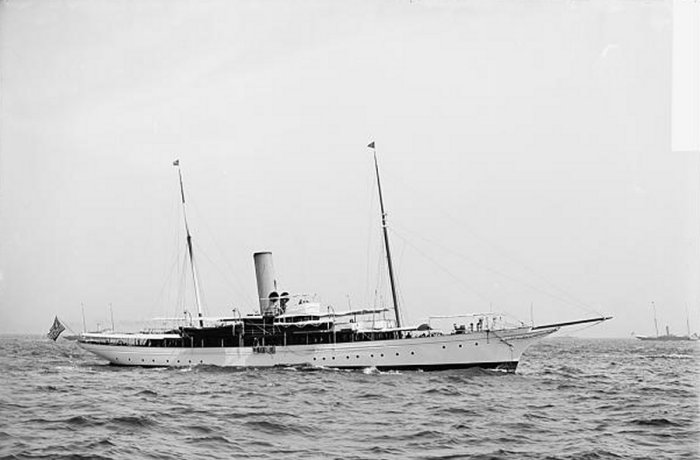
- Surf, circa 1903

History

United States
- Name: USS Surf (proposed)
- Namesake: Previous name retained (proposed)
- Owner: John Alton Harriss
- Operator: American Red Cross
- Port of registry: New York
- Builder: Ramage & Ferguson, Leith
- Yard number: 159
- Launched: 17 September 1898
- Completed: 1898
- Acquired: Made available to US Navy 1917
- Commissioned: Never
- Fate: Returned to owner 29 September 1917
- Notes: Operated as civilian steam yacht Surf

General characteristics
- Type: Patrol vessel (proposed)
- Tonnage: 390 GRT; 155 NRT
- Length: 198 ft (60 m) overall; 177.9 ft (54.2 m) registered
- Beam: 24.55 ft (7.5 m)
- Draft: 11 ft 9 in (3.58 m)
- Depth: 14.15 ft (4.3 m)
- Installed power: 109 NHP
- Propulsion: 1 × triple-expansion engine; 1 × screw
- Sail plan: schooner
- Speed: 11.5 kn (21.3 km/h)
- Crew: 18

USS Surf (SP-518) was a steam yacht that was offered to the United States Navy in 1917 but was never accepted.

== History ==
Surf was built as a civilian steam yacht in 1898 by Ramage & Ferguson at Leith Scotland, for E. D. Lambert of Berkshire, England.

Her later American owner, John H. Hanan, a millionaire shoe manufacturer, who had bought and used her for cruising in 1916, sold her to John Alton Harriss a New York businessman and former Physician of Manhattan, New York City in 1917. Harriss offered her to the U.S. Navy for use as a patrol vessel during World War I.

Dr. Harriss loaned the Surf to the Navy and the American Red Cross for use as an Ambulance ship in May 1917, he assumed all the costs for painting her in Red Cross livery, her maintenance and the salaries of the doctors and nurses detailed to her, as well as offering his own services. The loan was made on the basis that he be allowed to serve as the Medical Director on the yacht. She could accommodate 25 patients.

The Navy assigned her the section patrol number SP-518 but never commissioned her, and returned her to Harris on 29 September 1917. The threat of submarines had put paid to the idea.

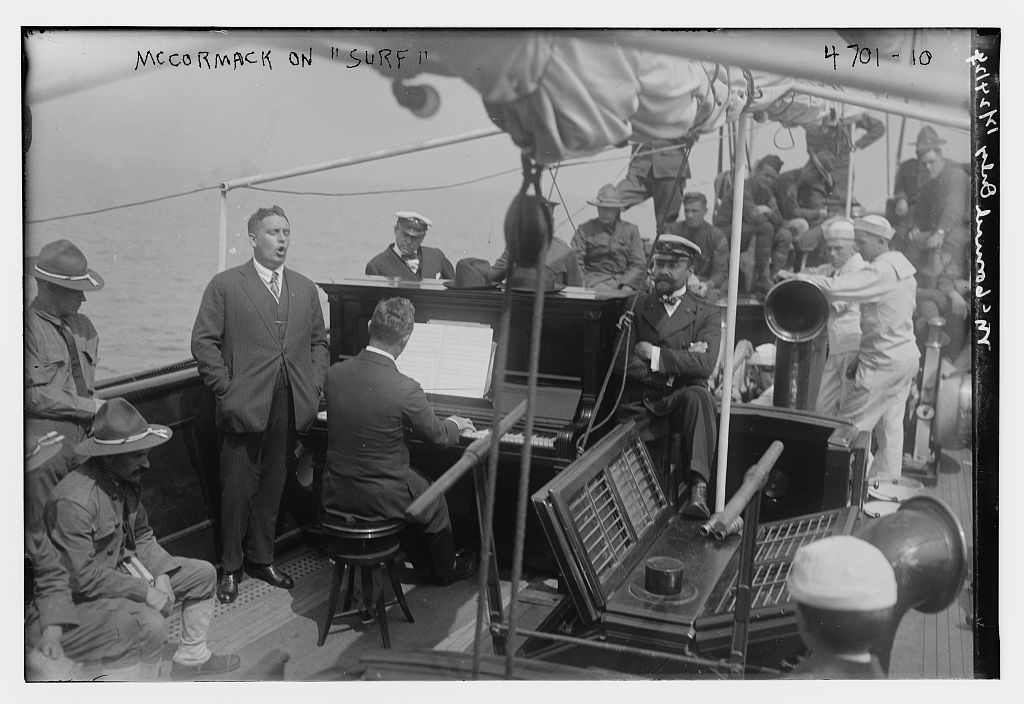
Irish American tenor singer John McCormack (1884–1945) singing on the "Surf", Harriss sitting with folded arms by the piano

From 30 July 1918 she started taking 120 Army patients a time from the United States General Hospital No. 1 on day trips, three times a week, along the Hudson River as a recreation boat, musical entertainment being provided.

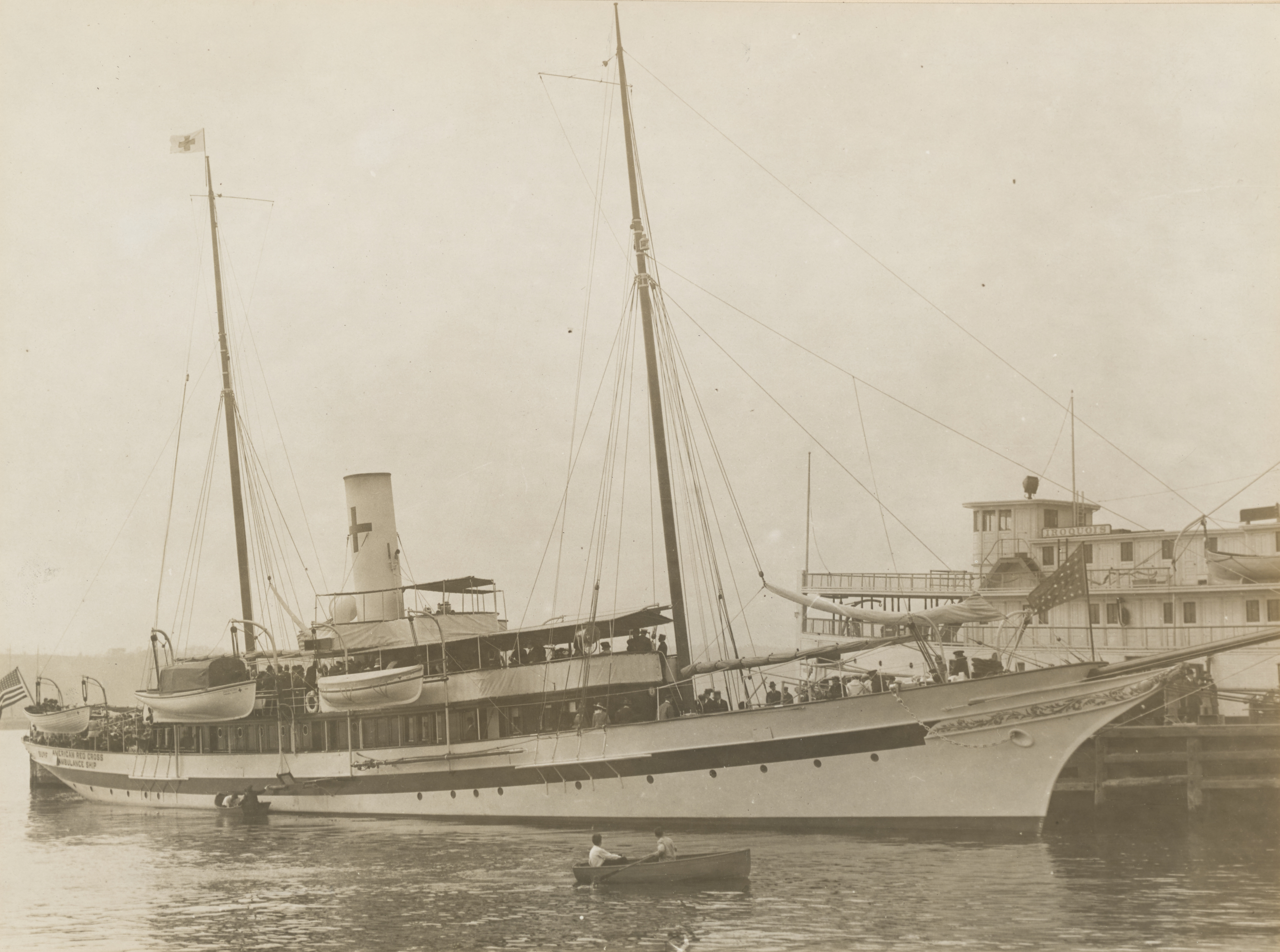
USS Surf, Society's floating palace now an ambulance ship
