= USS Menhaden (SP-847) =

Patrol vessel of the United States Navy

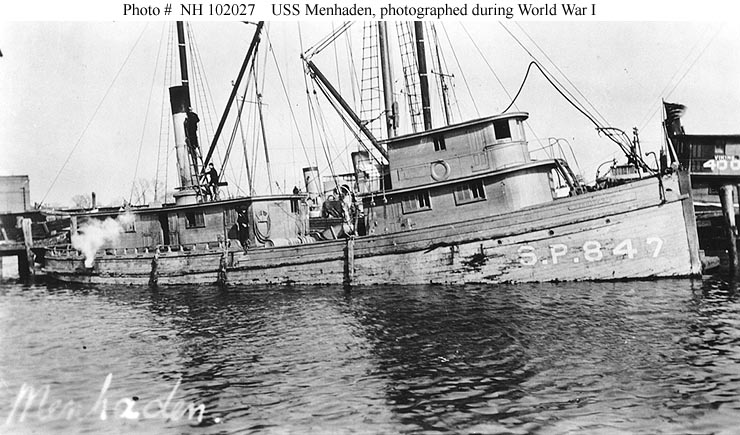
- USS Menhaden (SP-847) sometime between May 1917 and November 1918.

History

United States
- Name: USS Menhaden
- Namesake: Previous name retained
- Builder: C. W. Crockett, Pocomoke City, Maryland
- Completed: 1905
- Acquired: May 1917
- Commissioned: 21 May 1917
- Decommissioned: 12 March 1919
- Fate: Returned to owner 12 March 1919
- Notes: Operated as commercial tug Menhaden 1905-1917 and from 1919

General characteristics
- Type: Patrol vessel and tug
- Tonnage: 93 Gross register tons
- Length: 100 ft (30 m)
- Beam: 17 ft 9 in (5.41 m)
- Draft: 9 ft 6 in (2.90 m)
- Propulsion: Coal-burning steam engine
- Speed: 8 knots
- Complement: 19
- Armament: 2 × 1-pounder guns

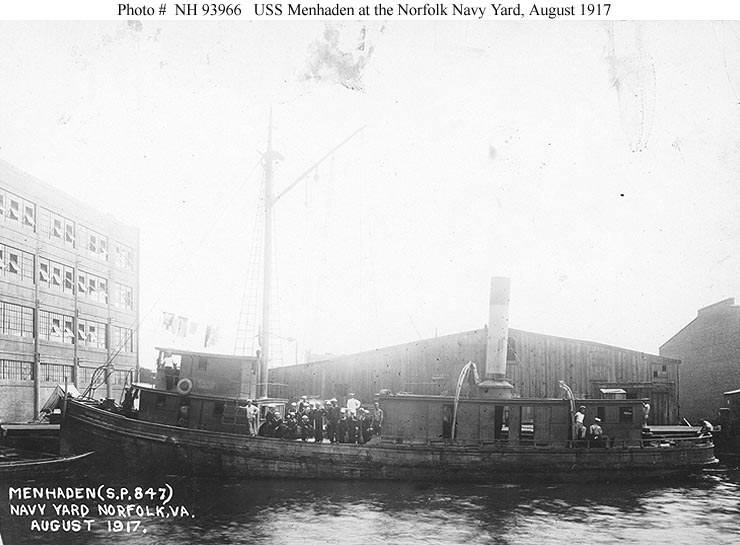
USS Menhaden (SP-847) at the Norfolk Navy Yard in Portsmouth, Virginia, in August 1917.

The first USS Menhaden (SP-847) was a United States Navy patrol vessel and tug in commission from 1917 to 1919.

Menhaden was built as a commercial tug of the same name in 1905 by C. W. Crockett at Pocomoke City, Maryland. In May 1917, the U.S. Navy chartered her from her owner, E. Benson Dennis of Cape Charles, Virginia, for use as a section patrol vessel during World War I. She was commissioned as USS Menhaden (SP-847) on 21 May 1917.

Assigned to the 5th Naval District and based at Norfolk, Virginia, Menhaden provided tug and towing services and conducted harbor patrols in Hampton Roads for the rest of World War I and into 1919. She also provided support to the 5th Naval District's minesweepers.

Menhaden was returned to Dennis on 12 March 1919.

== See also ==
- USS Menhaden (SS-377)
