= USS Herreshoff No. 323 =

Patrol vessel of the United States Navy

History

United States
- Name: USS Herreshoff No. 323
- Namesake: Previous name retained
- Builder: Herreshoff Manufacturing Company, Bristol, Rhode Island
- Completed: 1918
- Acquired: 6 June 1918
- Commissioned: 15 June 1918
- Fate: Sold 3 May 1927

General characteristics
- Type: Patrol vessel
- Displacement: 60 tons
- Length: 112 ft 5 in (34.26 m)
- Beam: 15 ft 2 in (4.62 m)
- Draft: 4 ft (1.2 m)
- Propulsion: Steam engine
- Speed: 24 knots
- Armament: 1 × 6-pounder gun

USS Herreshoff No. 323 (SP-2840), also written Herreshoff #323, was a United States Navy patrol vessel in commission from 1918 to 1927.

== Construction, acquisition, and commissioning ==
At the suggestion of Assistant Secretary of the Navy (and future President of the United States) Franklin D. Roosevelt (1882–1945), the banker and philanthropist J. P. Morgan, Jr. (1867–1943) of New York City, seeking a way to contribute to the U.S. war effort during World War I, contracted with the Herreshoff Manufacturing Company at Bristol, Rhode Island, for one of a small group of 60-ton steel-hulled steam-powered boats built to a naval patrol boat design for private owners with the intention that they would be made available to the U.S. Navy in time of war. Morgan's boat, with the builder's name Herreshoff No. 323, was completed in 1918.

On 6 June 1918, the U.S. Navy acquired Herreshoff No. 323 from Morgan for use as a section patrol boat during World War I. She was commissioned at Newport, Rhode Island, as USS Herreshoff No. 323 (SP-2840) on 15 June 1918.

== Operational history ==
Herreshoff No. 323 steamed to New London, Connecticut, on 19 June 1918 for fitting out, then was assigned to the 1st Naval District in northern New England. Based at Boston, Massachusetts, she operated as a patrol craft off Nantucket and in Boston Harbor for the rest of World War I. In December 1918, she was reassigned temporarily to the 2nd Naval District in southern New England, after she which she returned to the 1st Naval District and resumed operations from her base at Boston.

On 3 December 1920, Herreshoff No. 323 was assigned to duty as a general-purpose craft at Naval Torpedo Station Alexandria in Alexandria, Virginia. On 10 July 1923, she was transferred to Naval Torpedo Station Newport at Newport, Rhode Island, where she operated as a patrol craft and dispatch boat.

== Disposal ==
Herreshoff No. 323 was sold on 3 May 1927.
