= USS James River (SP-861) =

Patrol vessel of the United States Navy

History

United States
- Name: USS James River
- Namesake: Previous name retained
- Builder: C. Crockett, Pocomoke City, Maryland
- Acquired: May 1917
- Commissioned: 1917
- Fate: Returned to owner 22 October 1918
- Notes: Operated as civilian motorboat James River until 1917 and from 1918

General characteristics
- Type: Patrol vessel
- Length: 58 ft (18 m)
- Beam: 11 ft 6 in (3.51 m)
- Draft: 2 ft 9 in (0.84 m)
- Speed: 10 knots
- Complement: 5
- Armament: 2 × 1-pounder guns

The first USS James River (SP-861) was a United States Navy patrol vessel in commission from 1917 to 1918.

James River was built as a civilian motorboat of the same name by C. Crockett at Pocomoke City, Maryland. In May 1917, the U.S. Navy acquired her from her owner, the Virginia State Fish and Oyster Commission, for use as a section patrol boat during World War I. She was commissioned as USS James River (SP-861).

Assigned to the 5th Naval District, James River patrolled Pocomoke Sound, the James River, the Elizabeth River, and other parts of the lower Chesapeake Bay until just under three weeks before the end of World War I.

James River was returned to the Virginia State Fish and Oyster Commission on 22 October 1918.
