= USS SP-912 =

Patrol vessel of the United States Navy

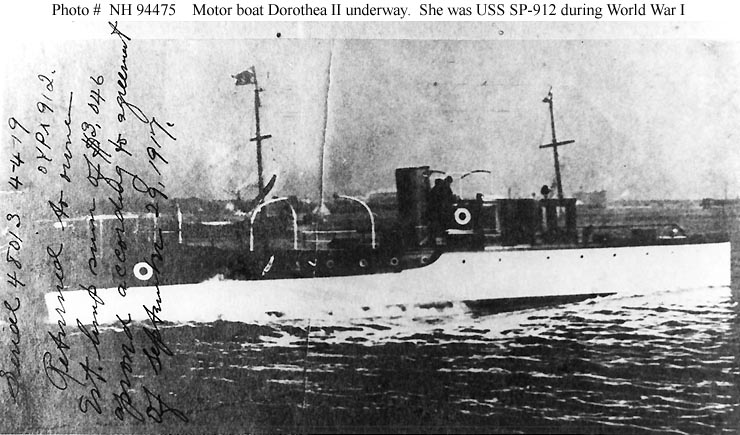
- SP-912 as the private motorboat Dorothea II sometime in 1916 or 1917.

History

United States
- Name: USS SP-912
- Namesake: Her section patrol number
- Builder: Smith & Williams Company, Salisbury, Maryland
- Completed: 1916
- Acquired: Acquired May 1917; Ordered delivered 27 October 1917
- Commissioned: 7 December 1917
- Decommissioned: 12 March 1919
- Stricken: early March 1919
- Fate: Returned to owner 4 April 1919
- Notes: Operated as private motorboat Dorothea II 1916-1917 and from 1919

General characteristics
- Type: Patrol vessel
- Length: 75.6 ft (23.0 m)

USS SP-847 was a United States Navy patrol vessel in commission from 1917 to 1919.

SP-912 was built as the private motorboat Dorothea II in 1916 by the Smith & Williams Company at Salisbury, Maryland. In May 1917, the U.S. Navy acquired her from her owner for use as a section patrol vessel during World War I, but did not order her delivered until 27 October 1917. She was commissioned as USS SP-912 on 7 December 1917.

SP-912 performed patrol duties for the rest of World War I. Stricken from the Navy List in early March 1919, she was reported returned to her owner on 4 April 1919.
