= USS Sayona II =

Patrol vessel of the United States Navy

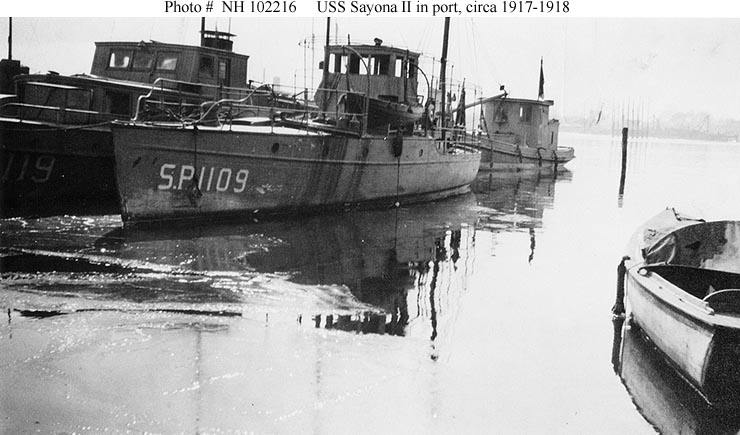
- USS Sayona II (SP-1109) in port in icy waters in the 5th Naval District during the winter of 1917-1918. At left is the patrol vessel USS Idylease (SP-119).

History

United States
- Name: USS Sayona II
- Namesake: Previous name retained
- Builder: H. Manley, Crosby, Massachusetts
- Completed: 1907
- Acquired: July 1917
- Commissioned: 3 August 1917
- Decommissioned: 30 December 1918
- Fate: Returned to owner 30 December 1918
- Notes: Operated as private motorboat or motor yacht Tip Top and Sayona II 1907-1917 and Sayona II from 1919

General characteristics
- Type: Patrol vessel
- Tonnage: 25 gross register tons
- Length: 60 ft 6 in (18.44 m)
- Beam: 12 ft (3.7 m)
- Draft: 3 ft 10 in (1.17 m)
- Speed: 10 knots
- Complement: 7
- Armament: 1 × 1-pounder gun; 2 × machine guns

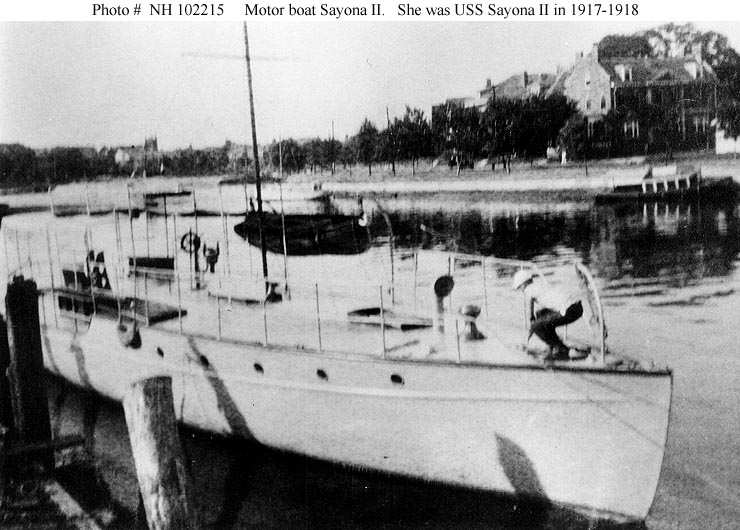
Sayonara II as a private motorboat or motor yacht sometime between 1907 and 1917

USS Sayona II (SP-1109) was a United States Navy patrol vessel in commission from 1917 to 1918.

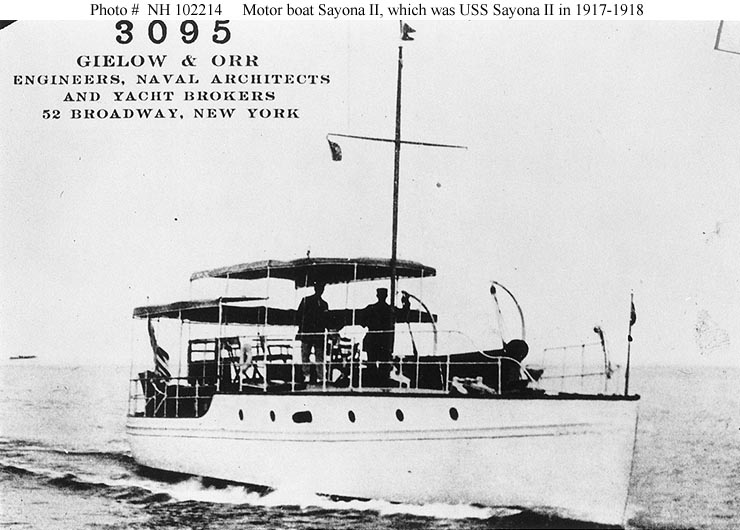
Sayonara II as a private motorboat or motor yacht sometime between 1907 and 1917

Sayona II was built as the private motorboat or motor yacht Tip Top by H. Manley at Crosby, Massachusetts, in 1907. She later was renamed Sayona II.

In July 1917, the U.S. Navy acquired Sayona II under a free lease from her owner, H. W. Hower of Rome, New York, for use as a section patrol boat during World War I. She was commissioned as USS Sayona II (SP-1109) on 3 August 1917.

Assigned to the 5th Naval District, Sayona II served on submarine net patrol duty in the Hampton Roads, Virginia, area until the spring of 1918. She then was reassigned to Customs House duty in the Hampton Roads area, which she continued through the end of World War I.

Sayona II was decommissioned on 30 December 1918 and returned to Hower the same day.
