= USS Vision (SP-744) =

Patrol vessel of the United States Navy

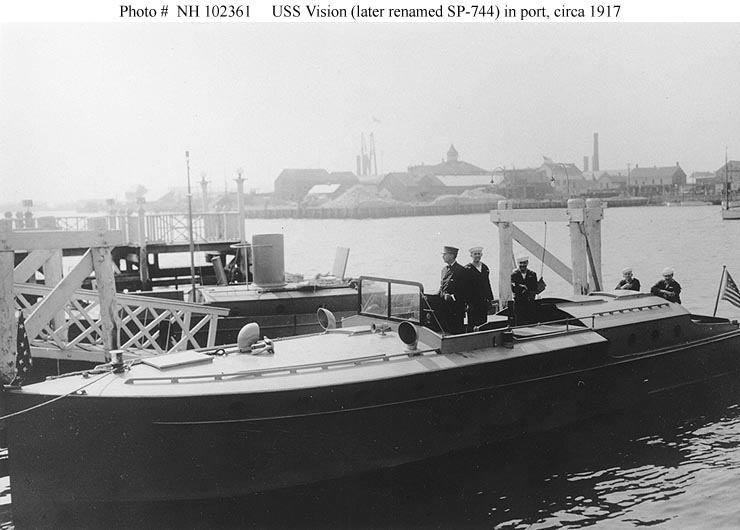
- USS Vision (SP-744) in 1917, possibly during her 3 July 1917 commissioning into United States Navy service.

History

United States
- Name: USS Vision (1917); USS SP-744 (1917-1919)
- Namesake: Vision was her previous name retained; SP-744 was her section patrol number
- Builder: Albany Boat Corporation, Watervliet, New York
- Completed: 1916
- Acquired: 3 July 1917
- Commissioned: 3 July 1917
- Decommissioned: 22 January 1919
- Renamed: SP-744 in 1917
- Fate: Returned to owner 22 January 1919
- Notes: Operated as private motorboat Vision 1916-1917 and from 1919

General characteristics
- Type: Patrol vessel
- Tonnage: 13 Gross register tons
- Length: 45 ft (14 m)
- Beam: 9 ft 9 in (2.97 m)
- Draft: 2 ft 9 in (0.84 m) mean
- Speed: 18 knots (33 km/h)
- Complement: 8
- Armament: 1 × .30-caliber (7.62-mm) machine gun

The first USS Vision (SP-744), later USS SP-744, was a United States Navy patrol vessel in commission from 1917 to 1919.

== History ==
Vision was built as a private, wooden-hulled, "Express-Cruiser"-type screw motor launch of the same name in 1916 by the Albany Boat Corporation at Watervliet, New York, to a design by Thomas V. Taylor. On 3 July 1917, the U.S. Navy acquired her under a free lease from her owner, L. E. Anderson, for use as a section patrol boat during World War I. She was commissioned the same day as USS Vision (SP-744). She soon was renamed USS SP-744 to avoid confusion with the patrol vessel USS Vision (SP-1114), which was commissioned on 27 August 1917.

Assigned to the 2nd Naval District in southern New England and based at Newport, Rhode Island, SP-744 served on harbor and harbor entrance patrol duties, including patrols off the Naval War College and Rose Island, until November 1917. After undergoing engine repairs from November 1917 to February 1918, she resumed patrols in the Newport area.

On 23 June 1918, SP-744 got underway from Newport and headed southward for duty in the 8th Naval District. Proceeding via a succession of ports along the United States East Coast from New London, Connecticut, to Charleston, South Carolina, SP-744 arrived at St. Augustine, Florida, on 15 October 1918. She subsequently operated out of Miami, Florida, for the rest of World War I and into January 1919.

SP-744 was decommissioned at Miami on 22 January 1919 and returned to her owner the same day.
