= USS Blue Bird (SP-465) =

Patrol vessel of the United States Navy

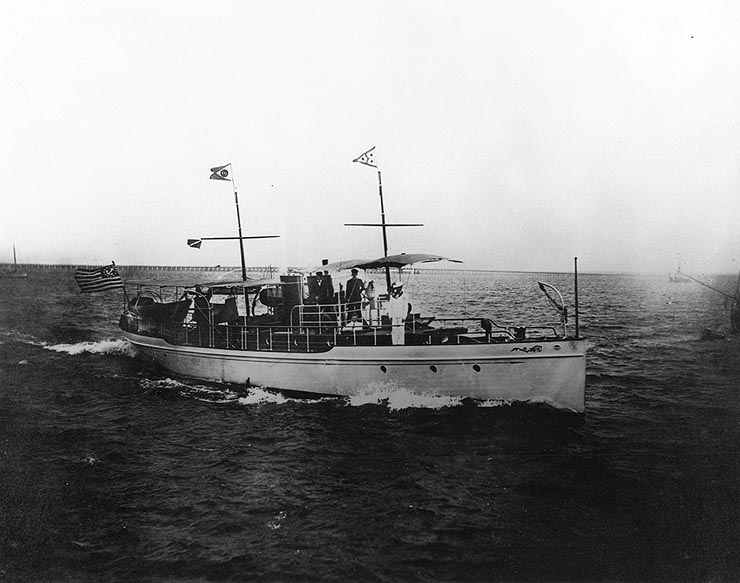
- Blue Bird as a private motorboat sometime between 1911 and 1917.

History

United States
- Name: USS Blue Bird
- Namesake: Previous name retained
- Builder: Matthews Boat Company, Port Clinton, Ohio
- Completed: 1911
- Acquired: 25 June 1917
- Commissioned: 17 December 1917
- Fate: Returned to owner 7 February 1919
- Notes: Operated as private motorboat Houqua, possibly Parthenia, and Blue Bird 1911-1917 and as Blue Bird 1919-1950

General characteristics
- Type: Patrol vessel
- Tonnage: 36 gross register tons
- Length: 72 ft 0 in (21.95 m)
- Beam: 12 ft 0 in (3.66 m)
- Draft: 3 ft 4.5 in (1.029 m) mean
- Propulsion: Internal combustion engine, two shafts
- Speed: 12.0 knots
- Complement: 11
- Armament: 1 × 1-pounder gun; 1 × .30-caliber (7.62-mm) machine gun

USS Blue Bird (SP-465) was a United States Navy patrol vessel in commission from 1917 to 1919.

Blue Bird was built as the private motorboat Houqua in 1911 by the Matthews Boat Company at Port Clinton, Ohio, for A. A. Augustus of Lakewood, Ohio. She may have been renamed Parthenia later, and eventually was renamed Blue Bird.

On 25 June 1917, the U.S. Navy acquired Blue Bird under a free lease from her owner – by then E. Palmer Gavit of Albany, New York – for use as a section patrol vessel during World War I. She was commissioned at the New York Navy Yard at Brooklyn, New York, as USS Blue Bird (SP-465) on 17 December 1917.

Assigned to the 3rd Naval District, Blue Bird operated in the New York City area for the remainder of World War I. She provided transportation for official passengers from place to place in the naval district, served as a boarding boat when later attached to the naval district's communication office, and operated in such areas as lower Gravesend Bay on patrol duty, tallying the names and numbers of vessels in those waters. She underwent upkeep and repairs in the Marine Basin at Ulmer Park, Brooklyn, from time to time.

Blue Bird apparently was decommissioned early in 1919 and was returned to her owner on 7 February 1919. She thereafter remained in civilian use until about 1950.
