= USS Velocipede =

Patrol vessel of the United States Navy

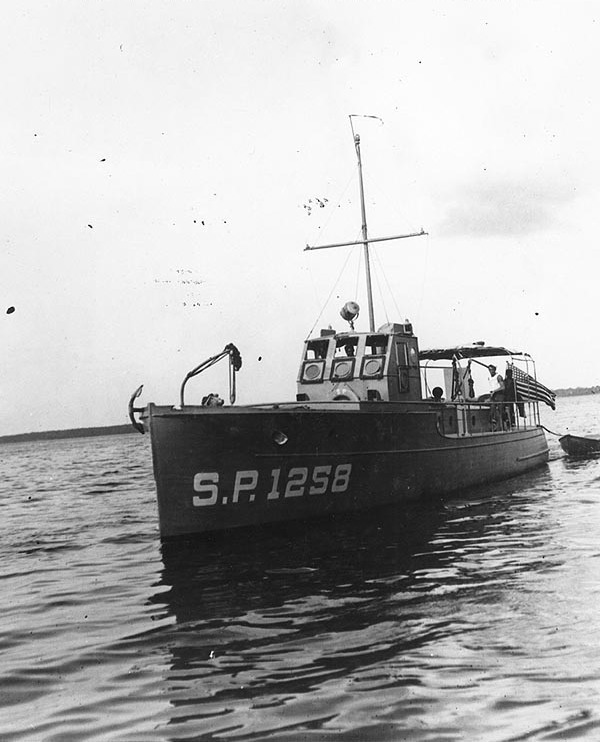
- USS Velocipede (SP-1258) near Miami, Florida, on 31 July 1918.

History

United States
- Name: USS Velocipede
- Namesake: Previous name retained
- Builder: Charles L. Seabury Company, Morris Heights, the Bronx, New York
- Completed: 1917
- Acquired: 27 October 1917
- Commissioned: 14 November 1917
- Fate: Returned to owner 6 February 1919
- Notes: Operated as private motorboat Velocipede 1917 and from 1919

General characteristics
- Type: Patrol vessel
- Tonnage: 25 Gross register tons
- Length: 60 ft 0 in (18.29 m)
- Beam: 11 ft 8 in (3.56 m)
- Draft: 2 ft 11 in (0.89 m) mean
- Complement: 8
- Armament: 1 × 1-pounder gun; 1 × machine gun

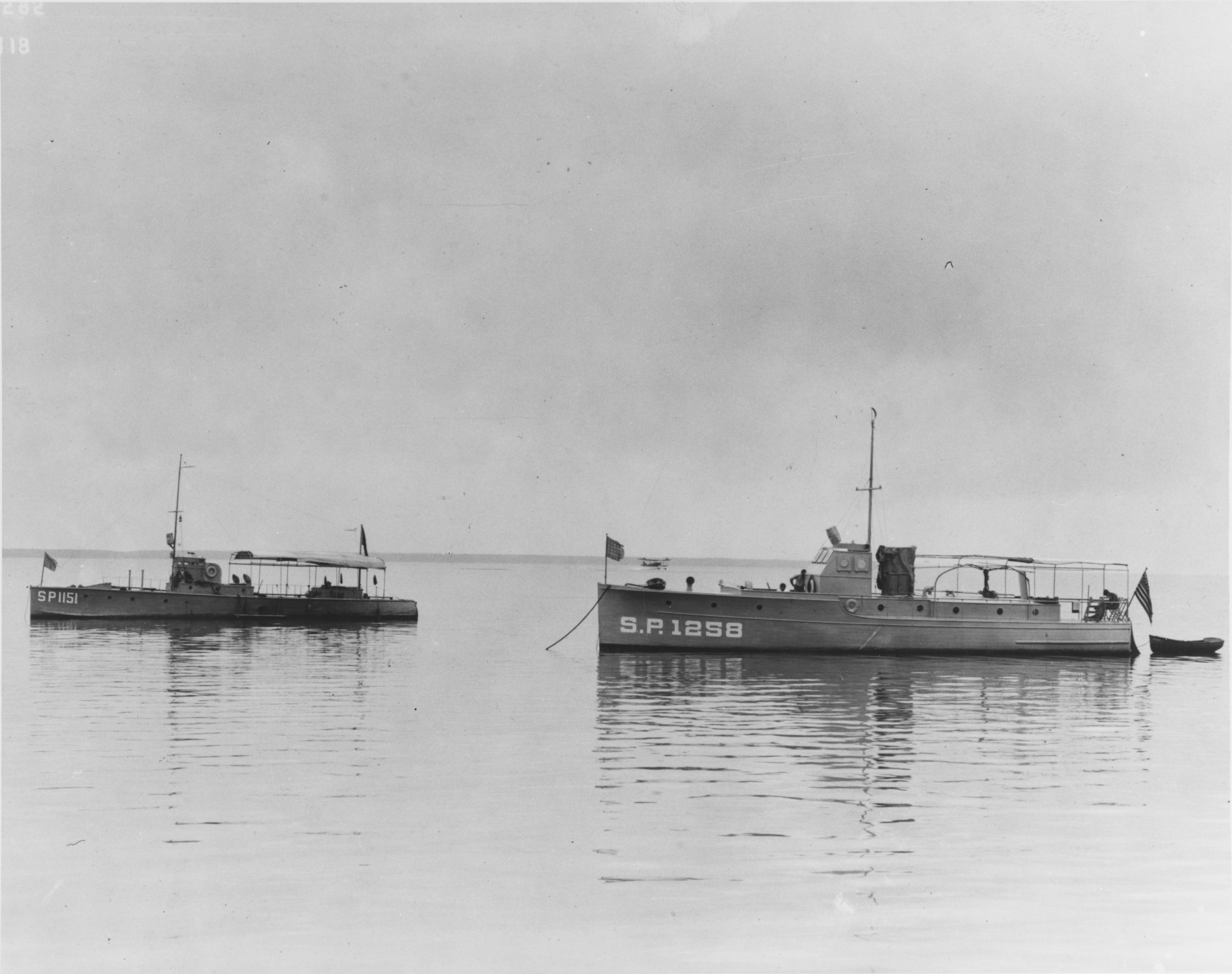
Patrol vessels USS Russ (SP-1151) (left) and USS Velocipede (SP-1258) at Miami, Florida, on 27 June 1918.

USS Velocipede (SP-1258) was a United States Navy patrol vessel in commission from 1917 to 1919.

Velocipede was built as a private motorboat of the same name in 1917 by the Charles L. Seabury Company at Morris Heights in the Bronx, New York, for K. C. Atwood Jr., of New York City. Atwood had her built to a design that would make her useful as a naval patrol boat and planned to make her available to the U.S. Navy for use in the event of war. Accordingly, the U.S. Navy acquired her under a free lease from Atwood on 27 October 1917 for use as a section patrol boat during World War I. She was commissioned as USS Velocipede (SP-1258) on 14 November 1917.

Assigned to the 7th Naval District for use as a "aeronautical patrol boat," Velocipede served on patrol duties at Naval Air Station Miami at Miami, Florida, until after the end of World War I.

The Navy returned Velocipede to Atwood on 6 February 1919.
