= USS Calumet (SP-723) =

Patrol vessel of the United States Navy

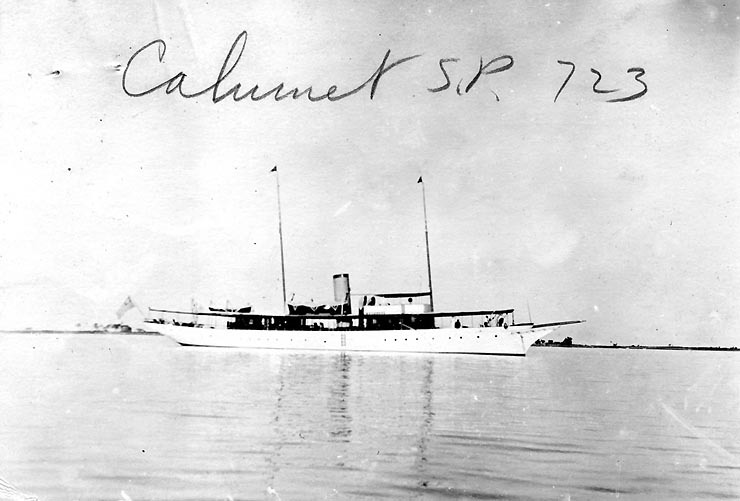
- Calumet as a private yacht sometime between 1903 and 1917.

History

United States
- Name: USS Calumet
- Namesake: Previous name retained
- Builder: George Lawley & Son, Neponset, Massachusetts
- Completed: 1903
- Acquired: 9 September 1917
- Commissioned: 7 December 1917
- Decommissioned: 11 January 1919
- Fate: Returned to owner January 1919; Scrapped 1929
- Notes: Operated as private yacht Calumet 1903–1917 and 1919–1929

General characteristics
- Type: Patrol vessel
- Tonnage: 153 Gross register tons
- Length: 147 ft (45 m)
- Beam: 17 ft 5 in (5.31 m)
- Draft: 7 ft 9 in (2.36 m)
- Propulsion: Steam engine
- Speed: 11 knots
- Complement: 42
- Armament: 2 × 6-pounder guns

The second USS Calumet (SP-723) was a United States Navy patrol vessel in commission from 1917 to 1919.

Calumet was built as a private steam yacht of the same name in 1903 by George Lawley & Son at Neponset, Massachusetts. On 9 September 1917, the U.S. Navy acquired her under a free lease from her owner for use as a section patrol boat during World War I. She was commissioned as USS Calumet (SP-723) on 7 December 1917.

Assigned to the 3rd Naval District, Calumet served for the rest of World War I as a guard ship and harbor entrance patrol craft in the New York City area and provided local antisubmarine escort in the vicinity of New York Harbor for inshore convoys as they voyaged along the United States East Coast.

Calumet was decommissioned at New York City on 11 January 1919 and returned to her owner. She remained in private use as a yacht until scrapped in 1929.
