= USS Thistle (SP-1058) =

Patrol vessel of the United States Navy

History

United States
- Name: USS Thistle
- Namesake: Previous name retained
- Builder: New York Yacht, Launch & Engine Company, Morris Heights, the Bronx, New York
- Completed: 1907
- Acquired: 17 August 1917
- Commissioned: 26 December 1917
- Fate: Ordered returned to owner 6 July 1918
- Notes: Operated as private motorboat Thistle 1907-1917 and from 1918

General characteristics
- Type: Patrol vessel
- Tonnage: 41 Gross register tons
- Length: 70 ft (21 m)
- Beam: 12 ft (3.7 m)
- Draft: 4 ft 0 in (1.22 m) aft
- Speed: 13 miles per hour
- Complement: 9
- Armament: 1 × 3-pounder gun; 1 × 1-pounder gun

The second USS Thistle (SP-1058) was a United States Navy patrol vessel in commission from 1917 to 1918.

Thistle was built as a private wooden-hulled motorboat of the same name in 1907 by the New York Yacht, Launch & Engine Company at Morris Heights in the Bronx, New York. On 17 August 1917, the U.S. Navy acquired her from her owner, William Emmerich of New York City, for use as a section patrol boat during World War I. She was commissioned as USS Thistle (SP-1058) on 26 December 1917.

Assigned to the 3rd Naval District, Thistle patrolled the coast and harbors between New London, Connecticut, and Barnegat, New Jersey.

Ultimately, Thistle was found to be unsuitable for naval service. On 6 July 1918, the Commandant, 3rd Naval District, ordered her to be returned to Emmerich.
