= SS Wakulla =

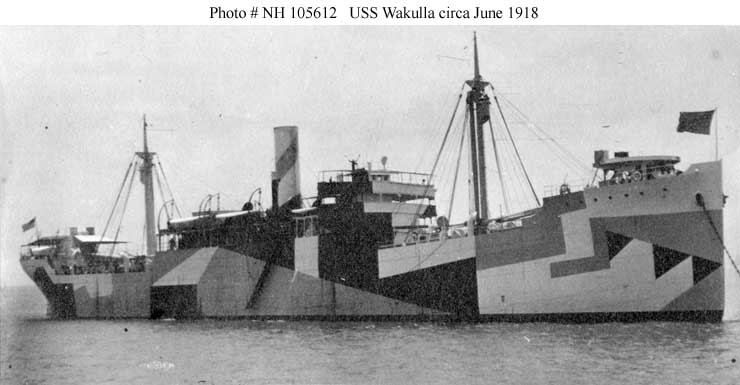
- USS Wakulla (ID-3147), probably in United States West Coast waters, at the time of her commissioning in June 1918 with dazzle camouflage.

History

United States
- Name: Wakulla
- Namesake: The Wakulla River, the village of Wakulla Beach, Wakulla County, and Wakulla Springs, all in Florida
- Owner: USSB
- Builder: Los Angeles Shipbuilding & Dry Dock Co., San Pedro
- Yard number: 2
- Laid down: 1 August 1917
- Launched: 14 January 1918
- Commissioned: 25 June 1918
- Maiden voyage: 21 July 1918
- Home port: Los Angeles
- Identification: US Official Number 216489; Call sign LKWS
- Fate: Scrapped, 1931

History

United States
- Name: USS Wakulla
- Operator: U.S. Navy (1918–1919)
- Acquired: 22 June 1918
- Commissioned: 26 June 1918
- Decommissioned: 18 April 1919
- Fate: Returned to owners 18 April 1919

General characteristics
- Type: Design 1013 ship
- Tonnage: 5,435 GRT; 3,323 NRT; 8,435 DWT
- Displacement: 12,186 tons (normal)
- Length: 410 ft 0 in (124.97 m)
- Beam: 54 ft 4 in (16.56 m)
- Draft: 24 ft 2 in (7.37 m) mean
- Depth: 27 ft 2 in (8.28 m)
- Installed power: 670 Nhp, 2,500 ihp
- Propulsion: Westinghouse Electric Co. steam turbine, double reduction geared to one screw
- Speed: 10 1/2 knots (12.1 mph; 19.4 km/h)
- Complement: 62
- Armament: During WWI; 1 × 5 in (127 mm) naval gun; 1 × 6-pounder gun

Wakulla was a steam cargo ship built in 1918–1919 by Los Angeles Shipbuilding & Dry Dock Company of San Pedro for the United States Shipping Board as part of the wartime shipbuilding program of the Emergency Fleet Corporation (EFC) to restore the nation's Merchant Marine.

SS Wakulla was a steel-hulled, single-screw cargo vessel built under a contract from the United States Shipping Board (USSB) at Los Angeles, California, by the Los Angeles Shipbuilding and Drydock Company. She was launched on 14 January 1918. Acquired by the United States Navy on 22 June 1918 for World War I service, she was given Identification Number (Id. No.) 3147 and commissioned as USS Wakulla on 26 June 1918 at San Francisco, California, named for Wakulla County, FL.

Wakulla loaded a capacity cargo of flour and departed for the United States East Coast on 21 July 1918. En route, she underwent repairs at Balboa, Panama, from 11 August 1918 to 18 August 1918. Making port at New York City on 27 August 1918, Wakulla bunkered, underwent further repairs, and sailed for Sydney, Nova Scotia, on 7 September 1918. On 13 September 1918, she joined a convoy bound for the British Isles and made arrival at Dublin, Ireland, on 29 September 1918.

After unloading her cargo there, Wakulla shifted to Liverpool, England, late in October 1918. Underway from Liverpool on 9 November 1918, Wakulla was en route to New York when the armistice of 11 November 1918 stilled the guns of World War I.

Loading a cargo of foodstuffs earmarked for the French government, Wakulla departed New York on 18 December 1918, only to turn back for repairs, arriving back at New York on 21 December 1918. She remained under repairs into 1919 before finally departing, sailing again for France on 28 January 1919. Arriving at Bordeaux on 19 February 1919, Wakulla discharged her cargo, loaded 1,000 tons of United States Army ordnance materiel, and departed France on 29 March 1919, bound for the United States. After arriving at New York on 13 April 1919, she was decommissioned at Hoboken, New Jersey, on 18 April 1919 and simultaneously struck from the Navy List.

Returned to the United States Shipping Board and once again becoming SS Wakulla, she operated actively out of Los Angeles, California, until 1923, when she was laid up, in reserve. She remained in this status until the first half of 1931 when, due to age and deterioration, she was scrapped at Baltimore, Maryland.
