= USS Casco (ID-1957) =

Cargo ship of the United States Navy

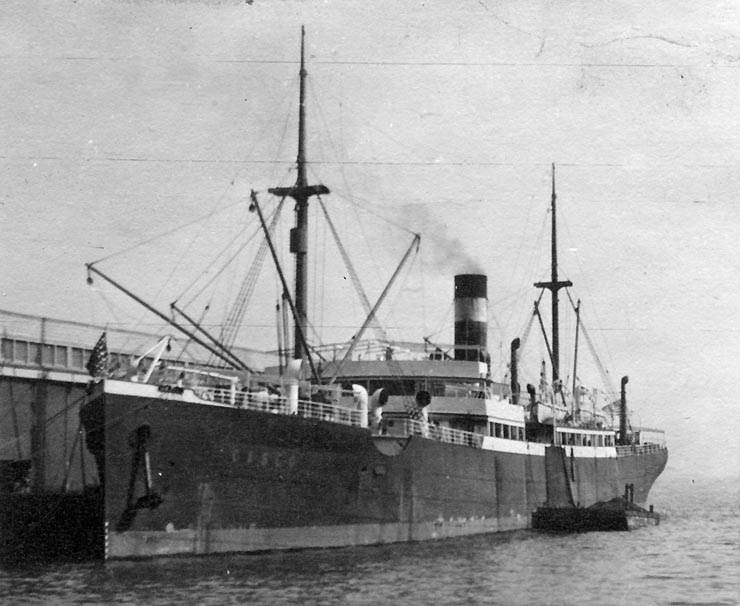
- SS Casco, probably around the time of her 8 November 1917 inspection by the 12th Naval District

History

United States
- Name: USS Casco
- Namesake: Casco Bay on the coast of Maine (previous name retained)
- Builder: FSG, Flensburg, Germany
- Launched: 9 August 1910
- Completed: 1910
- Acquired: 7 January 1918
- Commissioned: 8 January 1918
- Decommissioned: 22 March 1919
- Fate: Returned to United States Shipping Board, 22 March 1919
- Notes: Served as German commercial freighter SS Elmshorn 1910-1917; in United States Shipping Board custody as SS Casco 1917 and from 1919

General characteristics
- Type: Cargo ship
- Tonnage: 4,594 Gross register tons
- Displacement: 4,266 tons
- Length: 415 ft 0 in (126.49 m)
- Beam: 54 ft 0 in (16.46 m)
- Draft: 23 ft 6 in (7.16 m) mean
- Speed: 12 knots
- Complement: 70
- Armament: 1 × 4-inch (102-millimeter) gun; 1 × 3-inch (76.2-millimeter) gun

The second USS Casco (ID-1957) was a cargo ship that served in the United States Navy from 1918 to 1919.

Casco was built in 1910 by Flensburger Schiffbauges, Flensburg, Germany as SS Elmshorn. Elmshorn was seized by the United States upon the American entry into World War I. Renamed SS Casco, she came under the control of the United States Shipping Board. The U.S. Navy's 12th Naval District inspected her for possible naval service on 8 November 1917, and she was converted for naval use at the New York Navy Yard, Brooklyn, New York, prior to formal acquisition. The U.S. Navy acquired her on 7 January 1918 for World War I service on a bareboat charter from the Shipping Board. She was assigned the Identification Number (Id. No.) 1957 and commissioned as USS Casco on 8 January 1918.

Casco was assigned to the Naval Overseas Transportation Service. Operated first for United States Army account, and later for United States Shipping Board account, Casco carried U.S. Army cargo in four voyages from New York City to France between 20 January 1918 and 4 December 1918. This support of the American Expeditionary Force and the Army of Occupation continued with her last voyage in January 1919, from New York City to Lisbon, Portugal, carrying general cargo and Red Cross supplies. She returned to New York on 3 March 1919

Casco was decommissioned on 22 March 1919 and returned to the United States Shipping Board.
