= USS Jimetta =

Patrol vessel of the United States Navy

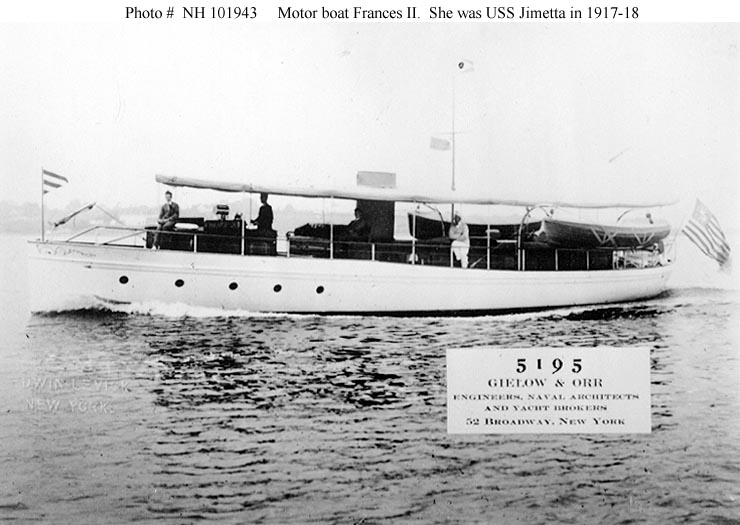
- Jimetta as the private motorboat Frances II sometime between 1915 and 1917.

History

United States
- Name: USS Jimetta
- Namesake: Previous name retained
- Builder: New York Yacht, Launch & Engine Company, Morris Heights, the Bronx, New York
- Completed: 1915
- Acquired: 16 July 1917
- Commissioned: 11 September 1917
- Decommissioned: 11 December 1918
- Fate: Returned to owner 11 December 1918
- Notes: Operated as private motor yacht Frances II and Jimetta 1915–1917 and Jimetta from 1918

General characteristics
- Type: Patrol vessel
- Tonnage: 32 Gross register tons
- Length: 65 ft (20 m)
- Beam: 14 ft (4.3 m)
- Draft: 4 ft (1.2 m) aft
- Speed: 10 knots
- Armament: 1 × 3-pounder gun; 1 × 1-pounder gun

USS Jimetta (SP-878) was a United States Navy patrol vessel in commission from 1917 to 1918.

Jimetta was built as the private motor yacht Frances II in 1915 by the New York Yacht, Launch & Engine Company at Morris Heights in the Bronx, New York. She later was renamed Jimetta.

On 16 July 1917, the U.S. Navy acquired Jimetta from her owner, Clement Studebaker of South Bend, Indiana, for use as a section patrol boat during World War I. She was commissioned as USS Jimetta (SP-878) on 11 September 1917 at the New York Navy Yard at Brooklyn, New York.

Assigned to the 3rd Naval District, Jimetta served as a patrol and dispatch boat in Long Island Sound for the rest of World War I.

Jimetta was decommissioned on 11 December 1918 and returned to Studebaker the same day.
