= USS Sioux (ID-1766) =

Collier of the United States Navy

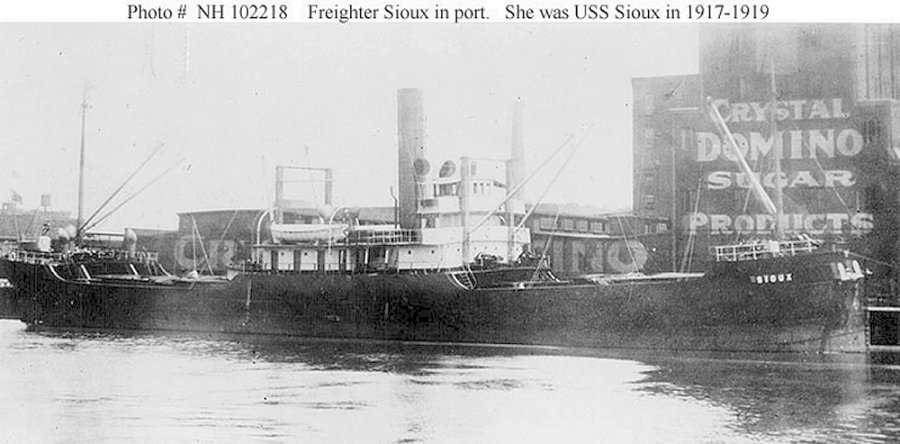

History

United States
- Name: USS Sioux
- Builder: American Ship Building Company, Cleveland, Ohio
- Launched: 1916
- Acquired: 1 December 1917
- Commissioned: 1 December 1917
- Decommissioned: 14 April 1919
- Fate: Returned to owner, scrapped 1929

General characteristics
- Type: Collier
- Displacement: 4,550 long tons (4,623 t)
- Length: 261 ft (80 m)
- Beam: 43 ft 6 in (13.26 m)
- Draft: 17 ft 9 in (5.41 m)
- Speed: 9 knots (17 km/h; 10 mph)
- Complement: 60
- Armament: 1 × 5 in (130 mm) gun; 1 × 3 in (76 mm) gun

USS Sioux (ID-1766) was a cargo ship in the United States Navy.

Sioux was built in 1916 by the American Ship Building Company, Cleveland, Ohio, was acquired by the U.S. Navy on 1 December 1917 from the Clyde Steamship Co., New York City, and commissioned the same day as a unit of the Naval Overseas Transportation Service.

== World War I Atlantic operations ==
Sioux carried coal between Navy coaling stations along the east coast, including Boston, Bermuda, and Key West. On 30 August 1918, she commenced the first of two voyages overseas, sailing from Norfolk to Glasgow via St. Nazaire. After discharging her cargo of coal, she sailed from Glasgow on 12 October, returning to Norfolk on 1 November. Sailing again from Norfolk on 28 November, this time on a U.S. Army account, she arrived at La Pallice, France, on 16 December. There, she received urgent voyage repairs and was held in European waters as being unsuitable for North Atlantic use during the winter months.

== Decommissioning ==
Selected for demobilization, she sailed on 19 February 1919, via the southern route, and arrived at Norfolk on 21 March. She was decommissioned on 14 April 1919, and returned to the Clyde Steamship Co., the same day. Sioux remained in merchant service until scrapped in 1929.
