= Bouker No. 2 =

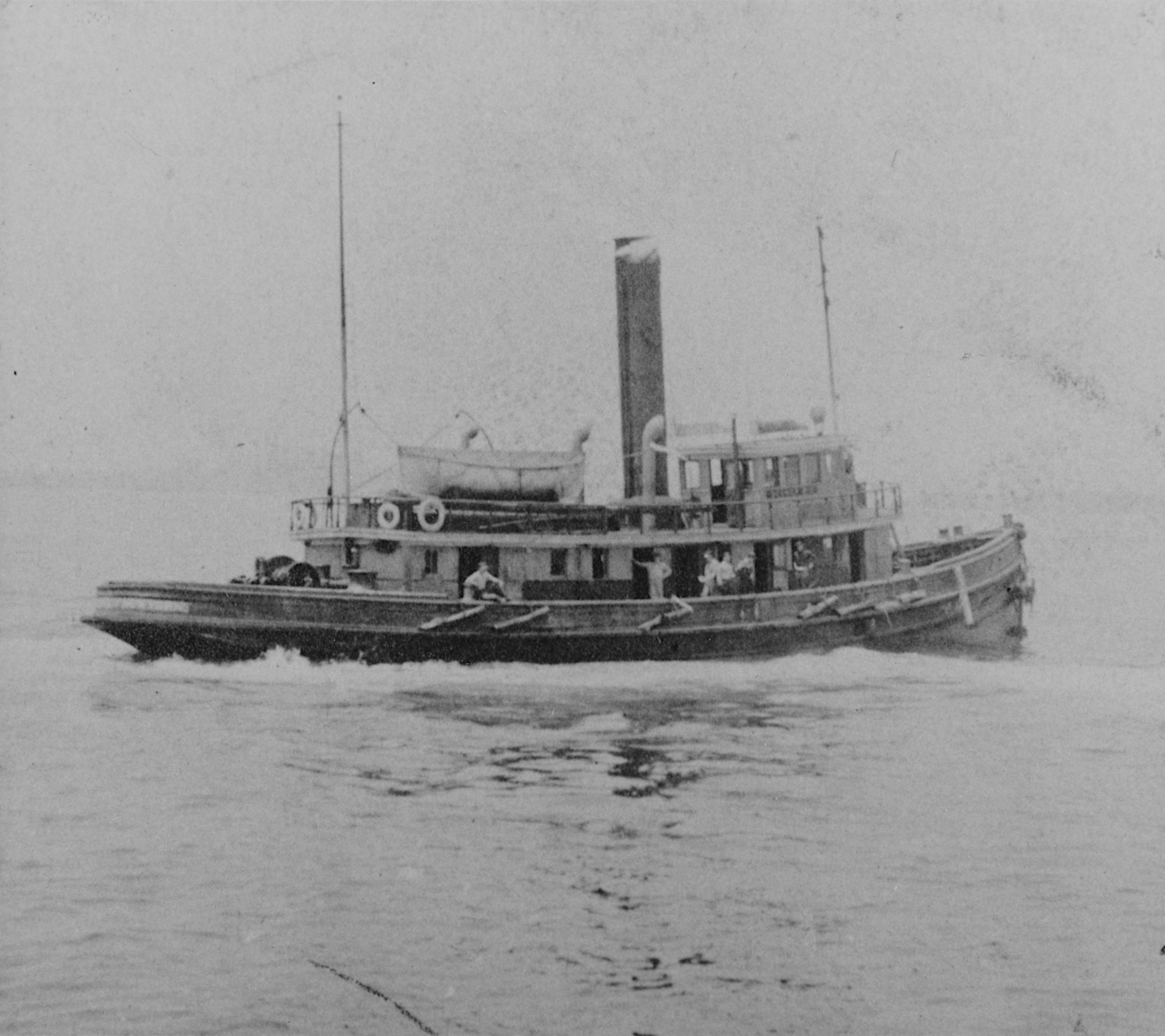
- Bouker No. 2 in civilian use prior to her U.S. Navy service.

History

United States
- Name: Bouker No. 2
- Owner: Rogers Towing Company (1904–06); Bouker Towing Company (1907–17); United States Navy (1917–22); New York Marine Company (1922–26)
- Operator: See owners
- Builder: A. C. Brown & Sons (Tottenville, Staten Island, New York)
- Launched: 26 March 1904
- Christened: Robert Rogers
- Completed: 23 June 1904
- Acquired: (US Navy): 14 December 1917
- Renamed: Bouker No. 2 (1906 or 1907); USS Bouker No. 2 (SP-1275) (1917); USS Bouker No. 2 (YT-30) (1920); New York Marine Co. No. 6 (1922)
- Reclassified: YT-30, 17 July 1920
- Stricken: 25 July 1922
- Identification: Official No. 200944
- Fate: Sunk in collision in East River, New York, 17 February 1926

General characteristics
- Type: Tugboat
- Tonnage: GRT 179; NRT 122
- Length: 95 ft 4 in (29.06 m)
- Beam: 25 ft 8 in (7.82 m)
- Draft: 12 ft (3.7 m) aft
- Depth of hold: 11 ft 4 in (3.45 m)
- Propulsion: Steam engine
- Speed: 10 knots
- Complement: 14 (naval service)
- Crew: 9 to 12 (merchant service)

Bouker No. 2, originally Robert Rogers, was a tugboat built in 1904 for merchant service in and around the waters of New York City. During World War I, the tug was commissioned into the United States Navy as USS Bouker No. 2 (SP-1275), and continued in naval service (later with the designation YT-30) until 1921. Briefly considered for service as a fireboat in Norfolk, Virginia, she was instead returned to merchant service in 1922 as a tugboat, under the name New York Marine Co. No. 6. She was sunk in collision with a passenger steamer in 1926.

== Construction and design ==
Robert Rogers, a wooden-hulled screw tugboat, was built in 1904 by A. C. Brown & Sons of Tottenville, Staten Island, for the Rogers Towing Company of New York City. She was slated for launch on Saturday 26 March 1904 at 3 pm, but became stuck on the ways halfway down and had to be towed into the water "with some little trouble" by tugboats. The vessel was completed on 23 June.

Described as a "large" tug, Robert Rogers had a length of 95 feet 4 inches (29.06 m), beam of 25 feet 8 inches (7.82 m), hold depth of 11 feet 4 inches (3.45 m) and draft of 12 feet (3.7 m) aft. She was fitted with four watertight bulkheads. Her registered tonnages were 179 gross and 122 net. She had an electric plant, steam steering gear, and a towing machine and steam capstan aft. In merchant service she had a crew of nine; this was increased to 14 in later naval service.

Robert Rogers was fitted with a second-hand engine taken from another, smaller Rogers Company tugboat, Maria Hoffman, as this engine had proven "too powerful" for the latter vessel. (Note: A 1911 source states that Robert Rogers' engine was built by the Staten Island Shipbuilding Company, but it is not known if this is a reference to the tug's original engine or a later replacement.) Hoffman's engine was fitted to Robert Rogers by Schantz & Eckert of Perth Amboy, after which the same company installed a new engine in Maria Hoffman. (Note: The source erroneously states that Maria Hoffman was built by A. C. Brown & Sons; in fact she was built by Denis McCarthy of Brooklyn.) Robert Rogers' original service speed is not known, but in later naval service, the tug's speed was recorded as 10 knots (12 mph; 19 km/h).

== Service history ==
=== Pre-war merchant service, 1904–1917 ===
After completion, Robert Rogers went to work with the Rogers Towing Company in and around the waters of New York. On 29 June 1906, the tug went to the assistance of a small sloop or catboat which had capsized in a squall between Sandy Hook and Swinburne Island in Lower New York Bay. One man, who had clung to the capsized vessel, was rescued, but his companions could not be found after a search and were presumed drowned. All three men had been members of the lifesaving corps.

By 1907, Robert Rogers had been acquired by the Bouker Towing Company and renamed Bouker No. 2, but remained homeported in New York City. The tug's principal occupation with the new company was the towing of scows to Lower New York Bay for waste dumping. The tug towed two scows at a time when engaged in this service, and was capable of completing two such voyages per day in good weather.

==== Incidents and accidents, 1907–1911 ====
On the night of 11 October 1907, Bouker No. 2 was involved in an accident when the two mud scows she was towing in the Kill Van Kull collided with a group of 24 boats in tow of the tug Ashbourne, which was traveling in the opposite direction—sinking one of them, the scow Irene. The owners of both tugs blamed the other but the courts concluded that Bouker No. 2 was primarily at fault and awarded damages accordingly.

The most serious accident involving Bouker No. 2 occurred in the early morning hours of 13 October 1909. While pulling a scow out of its slip at South Street, Brooklyn, at about 3 am, the towing cable briefly caught on the scow before snapping back, striking a deckhand in the throat and killing him instantly.

In the early morning of 15 November 1909, a motor boat, Otto W., capsized near the West Bank Light after attempting to pass astern of Bouker No. 2 and striking the hawser running between the tug and her tow. The launch's two occupants were thrown in the water, but quickly rescued and returned to shore by the tug. The owner of the launch was reported to the authorities for failing to have any lights.

A remarkable incident involving Bouker No. 2 occurred on 25 August 1911. After the tug had towed two scows out into the bay and they had been duly emptied, one of them was capsized by a large wave and its captain disappeared. After conducting a fruitless search for the missing seaman, he was presumed drowned by the crew of Bouker No. 2, and the tug headed back to port with the two scows still in tow, but the capsized vessel made progress very slow and the 17-mile (27 km) return voyage took seven hours or more. (Note: The return voyage took seven hours according to The Nautical Gazette, ten according to newspaper accounts.)

On arriving back at port, wharf workers heard a faint tapping beneath the hull of the upturned scow. The vessel was hastily beached to prevent it sinking, and a hole made in the hull, through which the missing captain, weak and almost exhausted from his ordeal, was extracted. The captain explained that he had been below deck when the scow capsized, and that water had entered the cabin but left an air pocket just large enough to allow him to continue breathing. He had continued tapping on the hull throughout the entire return voyage, while the air grew increasingly foul, until at the point of exhaustion his rescue had come.

=== Naval service, 1917–1921 ===
Bouker No. 2 was still in service with the Bouker Towing Company when the 3rd Naval District inspected her for possible World War I service as a minesweeper. The U.S. Navy acquired the vessel on 14 December 1917 and commissioned her as USS Bouker No. 2 (SP-1275).

Assigned to the 5th Naval District, Bouker No. 2 operated as a district craft, towing in the Hampton Roads, Virginia, area until the spring of 1921. When the U.S. Navy instituted an alphanumeric hull number classification system for its ships in mid-1920, she received the hull number YT-30 on 17 July 1920.

Bouker No. 2 was ordered inspected for sale on 23 April 1921, but was withdrawn from the sale list in July 1921. Instead, she was transferred to the City of Norfolk, Virginia, in August 1921 for use as a fireboat. Less than a year later, the Norfolk city government decided that it could not use Bouker No. 2 "for fire purposes" and returned her to the Navy at the Norfolk Navy Yard at Portsmouth, Virginia, on 15 June 1922.

=== Postwar merchant service, 1922–1926 ===
The Navy sold Bouker No. 2 to the New York Marine Company of Delaware on 25 July 1922, her name being struck from the Navy List simultaneously. Following the change in ownership, the tug was renamed New York Marine Co. No. 6.

On 17 February 1926, New York Marine Co. No. 6 was rammed and sunk in the East River, near the Brooklyn Bridge, by the Fall River Line's passenger steamer New Hampshire. The tug sank quickly and all twelve of her crew were thrown into the water, where some clung to ice floes and others donned life belts thrown from New Hampshire. Eight of the crew were quickly rescued, six of whom were later admitted to hospital suffering from exposure. The other four crew members, including the captain, were reported missing, but were later also found clinging to ice floes and rescued. There were no deaths in the accident.
