= USS Nightingale (SP-523) =

Patrol vessel of the United States Navy

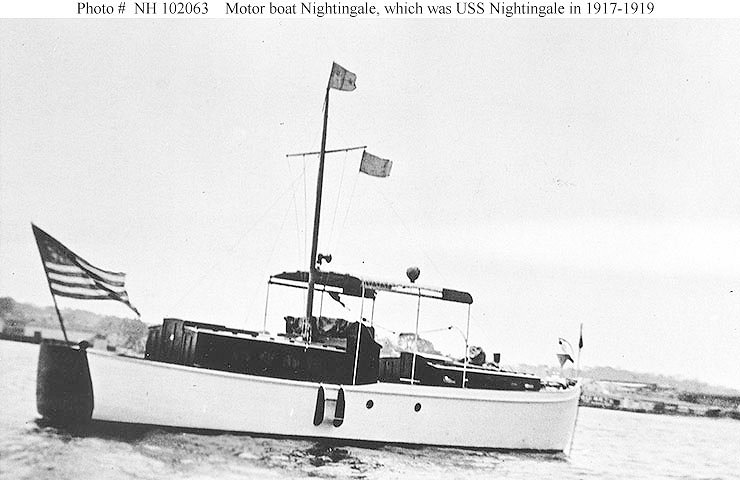

History

United States
- Laid down: date unknown
- Launched: date unknown
- Acquired: 11 June 1917
- Commissioned: 29 June 1917
- Out of service: 8 September 1919
- Stricken: c1919
- Fate: Sold, 15 December 1919

General characteristics
- Displacement: 14 tons
- Length: 46 ft (14 m)
- Beam: 16 ft (4.9 m)
- Draft: varies
- Speed: 13.9 knots
- Complement: 11
- Armament: one 1–pounder., 1 machine gun

USS Nightingale (SP-523) was a Nightingale-class patrol boat acquired by the U.S. Navy for the task of patrolling coast and harbor waters of the United States.

Nightingale, a motorboat built by C. W. Ferguson, Groton, Connecticut, was acquired by the Navy from J. L. Hubbard, Groton, 11 June 1917 and commissioned 29 June 1917 at Newport, Rhode Island.

== World War I service ==
Operating in the 2nd Naval District, and based at Newport, Rhode Island, during World War I, Nightingale patrolled the experimental submarine zone off New London, Connecticut, throughout the fall, inspecting commercial vessels for district licenses and alternating duties with USS Magistrate (SP-143), patrolling the harbor entrance.

On special duty 18 September, she maneuvered with a Chilean submarine off Fishers Island. Continuing patrol duty, Nightingale directed all commercial traffic from the experimental zone 31 October, shifting station to Fishers Island Sound 11 November. Relieved by USS Daraga (SP-43) the 13th, she thereafter alternated duties with Daraga off New London, Fishers Island, and Stonington, Connecticut, and later with Magistrate and USS Kingfisher (SP-76).

Nightingale continued on patrol until 8 September 1919 when she was placed out of service. She was sold to G. A. Ford Yachts Agency, New York City 15 December 1919.
