= USS Saco (YT-31) =

Tugboat of the United States Navy

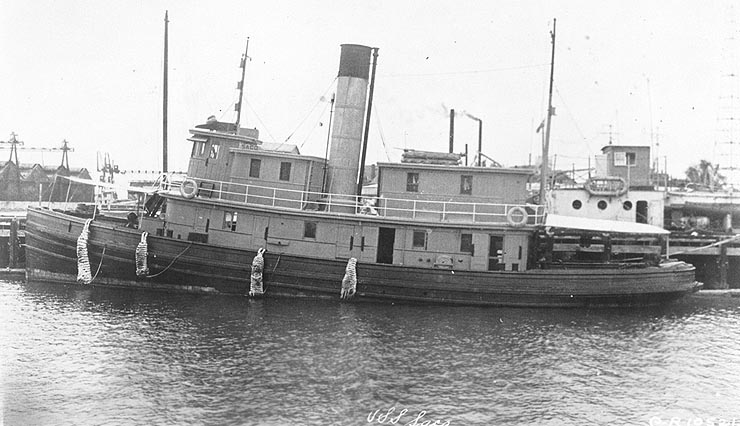
- USS Saco

History

United States
- Name: USS Saco (YT-31)
- Builder: A.C. Brown and Son, Tottenville, New York
- Laid down: 1912
- Acquired: 30 September 1918
- Stricken: 22 October 1926
- Fate: Sold, 3 May 1927

General characteristics
- Type: Tug
- Displacement: 119 long tons (121 t)
- Length: 90 ft (27 m)
- Beam: 24 ft 8 in (7.52 m)
- Draft: 8 ft (2.4 m)
- Speed: 8 knots (15 km/h; 9.2 mph)

The second USS Saco was a yard tug in the United States Navy during the 1920s.

The steam tug Alexander Brown was built in 1912 for the Aransas Dock and Channel Company, Aransas Pass, Texas, by A.C. Brown and Son, Tottenville, New York. She was acquired by the Navy on 30 September 1918 and designated SP-2725.

Purchased for use as a yard tug at the Naval Air Station Key West, she operated there as Alexander Brown until 24 November 1920, when she was renamed Saco and redesignated YT-31. Saco continued yard tug operations until struck from the Navy list on 22 October 1926. She was sold to N. Block and Company, Norfolk, Virginia, on 3 May 1927.
