= USS Cambridge =

Four ships of the United States Navy have been named USS Cambridge, after the various US places named Cambridge.

- USS Cambridge (1860), was an armed steamship in use during the American Civil War.
- USS Cambridge (1869), was a screw sloop renamed Congress on 10 August 1869 prior to her commissioning.
- USS Cambridge (ID-1651), a steamship, was purchased by the Navy on 22 October 1917, and turned over to the 3rd Naval District for patrol service. She was found to be unsuitable for naval duty and was stricken from the Navy List on 1 March 1918 and sold a year later.
- USS Cambridge (CA-126), was to have been an Oregon City-class heavy cruiser, but construction was canceled 12 August 1945.
