= USS Minerva (SP-425) =

Patrol vessel of the United States Navy

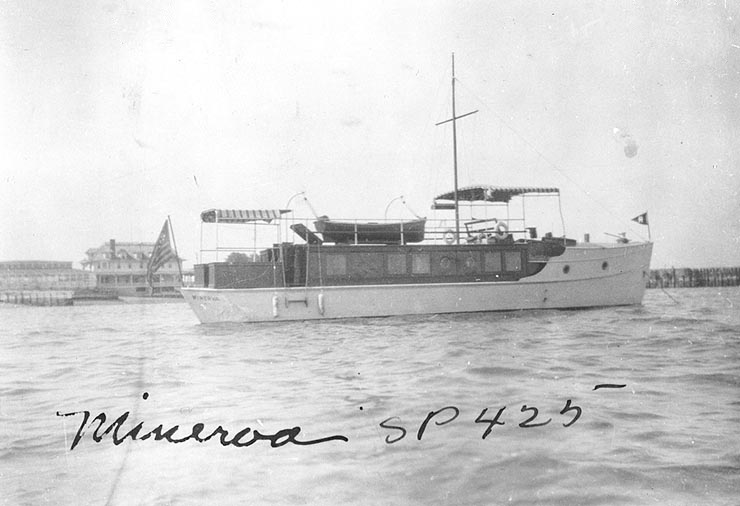
- Minerva as a private motorboat, sometime between 1914 and 1917.

History

United States
- Name: USS Minerva
- Namesake: Previous name retained
- Builder: Luders Marine Construction Company, Stamford, Connecticut
- Completed: 1914
- Acquired: 7 May 1917
- Commissioned: 20 July 1917
- Decommissioned: 14 January 1919
- Fate: Returned to owner 14 January 1919
- Notes: Operated as private motorboat Minerva 1914-1917 and from 1919

General characteristics
- Type: Patrol vessel
- Tonnage: 55 gross register tons
- Length: 80 ft (24 m)
- Beam: 14 ft (4.3 m)
- Draft: 4 ft 6 in (1.37 m)
- Speed: 12 knots
- Complement: 13
- Armament: 1 × 3-pounder gun; 2 × machine guns

USS Minerva (SP-425) was a United States Navy patrol vessel in commission from 1917 to 1919.

Minerva was built as a private motorboat of the same name in 1914 by the Luders Marine Construction Company at Stamford, Connecticut. On 7 May 1917, the U.S. Navy acquired her under a free lease from her owner, Mrs. Elizabeth C. Bowen of New York City, for use as a section patrol boat during World War I. The boat was commissioned on 20 July 1917 as USS Minerva (SP-425), with Ensign R. G. Megargel, in command.

Assigned to the 3rd Naval District, Minerva served as a patrol boat in the coastal waters of the New York City area for the rest of World War I. She also guarded the submarine nets and torpedo nets in the approaches to New York Harbor.

Minerva was decommissioned and returned to her owner on 14 January 1919.
