= USS A. Brook Taylor =

Planned designation for a fishing vessel the United States Navy

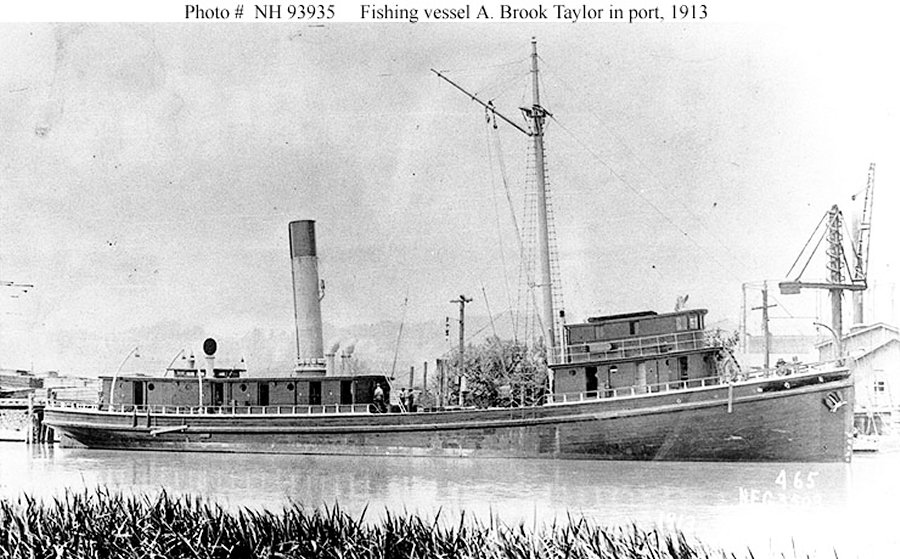
- Fishing vessel A. Brook Taylor in 1913.

History

United States
- Name: USS A. Brook Taylor (planned)
- Namesake: Previous name retained
- Completed: 1913
- Acquired: Never
- Notes: Operated as private fishing vessel A. Brook Taylor

General characteristics
- Type: Minesweeper (planned)
- Displacement: 295 tons
- Length: 150 ft 0 in (45.72 m)
- Beam: 24 ft 0 in (7.32 m)
- Draft: 13 ft 6 in (4.11 m) aft
- Speed: 11 knots (20 km/h)

USS A. Brook Taylor (SP-326) was the planned designation for a fishing vessel the United States Navy considered for use as a minesweeper during World War I but never acquired.

A. Brook Taylor was built as a wooden-hulled commercial fishing trawler in 1913. She was the property of the Virginia Fishing Company of Ditchly, Virginia, in June 1917 when the U.S. Navy inspected her for possible naval service during World War I. She was found to be suitable for service as a minesweeper and, according to a Department of the Navy letter dated 16 November 1917, was to be fitted out as such "preparatory to . . . [being called] into service in case of emergency." The anticipated "emergency" undoubtedly referred to extensive mining of American waters. However, even though German submarines did lay some mines off the United States East Coast, the Navy never took over A. Brook Taylor, and she remained in commercial service.
