= USS Atglen =

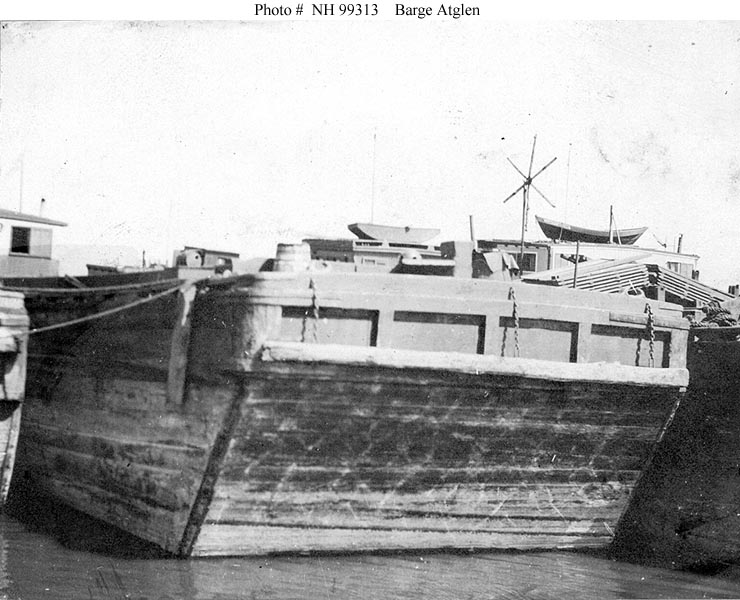
- Barge Atglen, probably photographed at New York City at the time of her 1917 inspection by the 3rd Naval District, prior to her U.S. Navy service.

History

United States
- Name: USS Atglen
- Namesake: Atglen, Pennsylvania
- Laid down: 1900
- Acquired: 16 November 1917
- Fate: Returned to owner 1919

General characteristics
- Type: Barge
- Displacement: 150 tons
- Propulsion: None
- Armament: None

USS Atglen (ID-1315), also sometimes listed as ID-1350, was a United States Navy barge in service from 1917 to 1919.

Atglen was laid down as a non-self-propelled commercial barge at South Rondout, New York, in 1900. The U.S. Navy' 3rd Naval District inspected her for possible World War I service in 1917, and they acquired her on 16 November 1917, assigning the barge one of two reported Naval Registry Identification Numbers (either Id. No. 1315 or Id. No. 1350). She probably served in and near New York Harbor through the end of the war.

Atglen was returned to her owners sometime in 1919.
