= USS Augusta (SP-946) =

Patrol vessel of the United States Navy

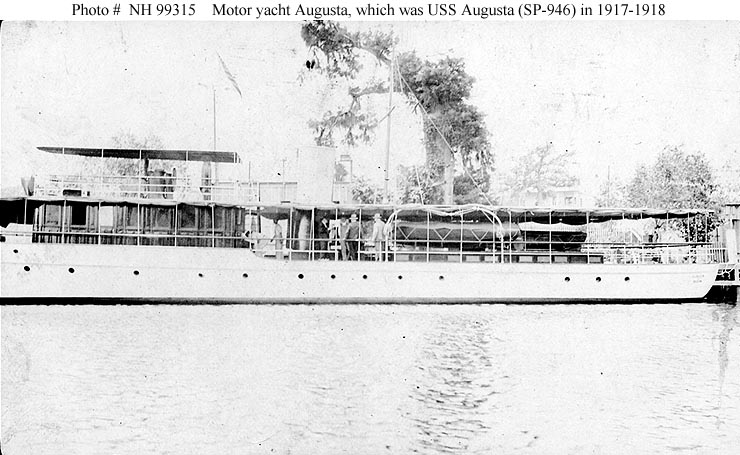
- Augusta (American Motor Yacht, 1912) In port, probably in the vicinity of Houston, Texas, prior to her World War I era Naval service. This craft was leased by the Navy on 1 August 1917 and placed in commission as USS Augusta (SP-946) on 11 August. She was decommissioned and returned to her owner on 12 December 1918.

History

United States
- Name: USS Augusta
- Builder: Nelson Shipyard and Construction Co., Harrisburg, Texas
- Launched: 1912
- Acquired: by lease, 1 August 1917
- Commissioned: 11 August 1917
- Decommissioned: 12 December 1918
- Fate: Returned to previous owner

General characteristics
- Type: Patrol boat
- Displacement: 93 long tons (94 t)
- Length: 103 ft (31 m)
- Beam: 16 ft (4.9 m)
- Draft: 5 ft (1.5 m)
- Speed: 12 knots (22 km/h; 14 mph)
- Complement: 14 officers and enlisted
- Armament: 2 × 3-pounder guns; 1 × machine gun

The third USS Augusta (SP-946) was a luxuriously furnished, wooden-hulled steam yacht which served in the United States Navy as a patrol boat.

Designed by the naval architects Gielow and Orr, Augusta was built in 1912 by the Nelson Shipyard and Construction Co., of Harrisburg, Texas, for Camille G. Pillot (1861–1953), a prominent Houston merchant, one of the original stockholders of the Houston Chronicle newspaper and President of the Henke & Pillot chain of supermarkets headquartered in Houston, Texas

Augusta was acquired by the Navy under a free lease on 1 August 1917 and assigned the classification SP-946. She was commissioned on 11 August 1917, with Ensign Norman V. Pillot, USNRF, coincidentally the son of the original owner, in command. US Navy records indicate that the Augusta spent the duration of World War I on section patrol duties in the 8th Naval District, specifically operating out of Galveston, Texas, on harbor patrol, tracking the movements of shipping in that busy Gulf Coast port, and conducting routine training and drills, interspersed with the usual upkeep and maintenance.

Decommissioned on 12 December 1918, a month and a day after the armistice was signed, she was simultaneously returned to her owner.

Later re-engined, Augusta remained in the hands of Camille Pilot until his death at the age of 92, in 1953. Shortly thereafter, the name Augusta disappeared from the contemporary lists of American yachts.

The Augusta was moored at Palacios, Texas in the mid-1950s when damaged during a storm and sunk at the pier. The owner at that time declined to raise the hull and she was sold for salvage to Mr. Clyde Hammond. She was pumped out, interior furnishings were removed and the hull pulled up on the shore for final salvage. The shafts, propeller and other fittings were sold for scrap. The hull planking and deck house were salvaged for use in the construction of other vessels at the Palacios Shipyard.
