= USS G. H. McNeal =

Minesweeper of the United States Navy

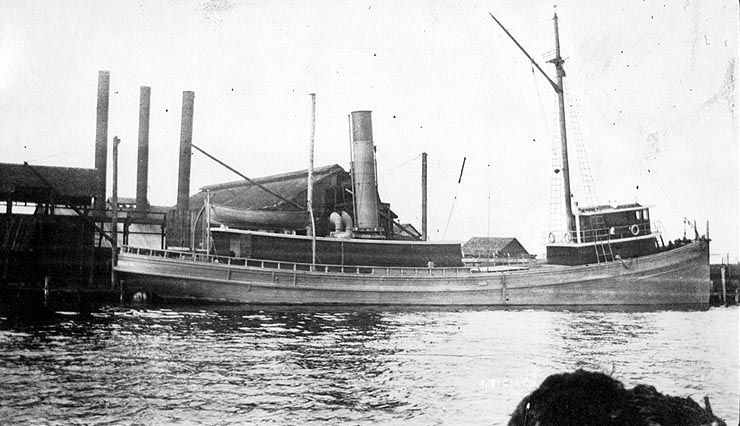
- G. H. McNeal as a commercial fishing vessel sometime between 1911 and 1917, prior to her U.S. Navy service.

History

United States
- Name: USS G. H. McNeal
- Namesake: Previous name retained
- Builder: W. C. Abbott, Milford, Delaware
- Completed: 1911
- Acquired: 26 May 1917
- Commissioned: 26 May 1917
- Decommissioned: 17 May 1919
- Fate: Sold 17 July 1919
- Notes: Served as civilian fishing trawler G. H. McNeal or George H. McNeal 1911–1917

General characteristics
- Type: minesweeper
- Tonnage: 244 Gross register tons
- Length: 140 ft (43 m)
- Beam: 21 ft (6.4 m)
- Draft: 5 ft (1.5 m)
- Sail plan: Steam engine
- Speed: 10 knotss
- Complement: 5
- Armament: 2 × 3-inch (76.2-millimeter) guns

USS G. H. McNeal (SP-312), also called George H. McNeal, was a United States Navy minesweeper in commission from 1917 to 1919.

G. H. McNeal was built as a wooden-hulled civilian steam tug in 1911 by W. C. Abbott at Milford, Delaware, and was employed as a "menhaden fisherman"-type commercial fishing vessel. The U.S. Navy purchased her from the McNeal-Edwards Company of Reedville, Virginia, on 26 May 1917 for World War I use and commissioned her the same day as USS G. H. McNeal (SP-312).

G. H. McNeal was fitted with minesweeping apparatus and enrolled in the Naval Coast Defense Reserve of the 5th Naval District. Based at Norfolk, Virginia, she served on patrol in the Virginia Capes area as a unit of Mine Sweeping Squadron 3 throughout her Navy career.

G. H. McNeal was decommissioned on 17 May 1919 and was sold to the McNeal Dodson Company of Norfolk on 17 July 1919.
