= USS Sturdy (SP-82) =

Patrol vessel of the United States Navy

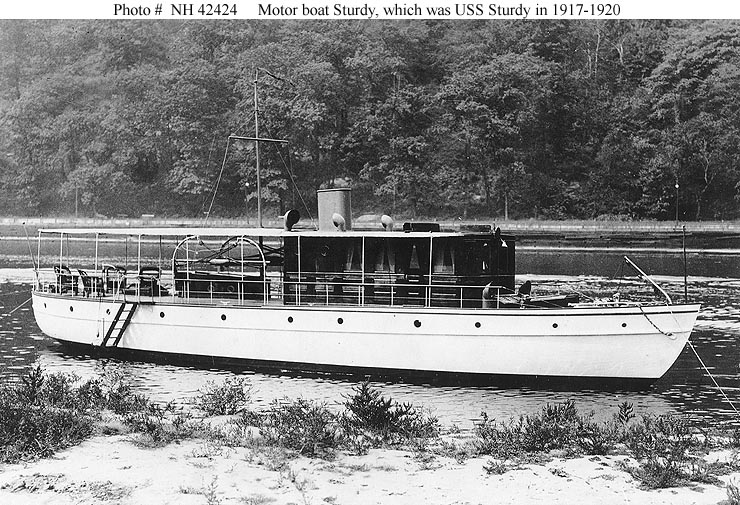
- Sturdy prior to her U.S. Navy service

History

United States
- Name: USS Sturdy
- Namesake: Previous name retained
- Builder: New York Yacht, Launch, and Engine Company, Morris Heights, New York
- Laid down: 1905
- Launched: 1905
- Completed: 1905
- Acquired: 25 May 1917
- Commissioned: 25 June 1917
- Decommissioned: 9 October 1919
- Stricken: 13 January 1920
- Home port: New York City, New York
- Fate: Sold 30 March 1920
- Notes: In civilian use 1905-1917

General characteristics
- Type: Patrol vessel
- Tonnage: 52 tons
- Length: 75 ft (23 m)
- Beam: 15 ft (4.6 m)
- Draught: 5 ft 6 in (1.68 m)
- Speed: 10 knots (19 km/h)
- Complement: 14
- Armament: 1 × 3-pounder gun; 2 × machine guns

The first USS Sturdy (SP-82) was a patrol boat acquired by the U.S. Navy for the task of patrolling the coastal waters of the U.S. East Coast during World War I. Her primary task was to guard the coastal area against German submarines by tending to antisubmarine nets in New York Harbor.

Sturdy (SP-82) was built in 1905 by the New York Yacht, Launch, and Engine Company, Morris Heights, New York. The motor boat was acquired by the Navy on 25 May 1917 from J. A. Nickelson of Morris Heights, and was commissioned on 25 June 1917.

During World War I, Sturdy was assigned to the 3rd Naval District and served as a net tender until placed on sale on 9 October 1919. She was struck from the Navy list on 13 January 1920 and sold on 30 March 1920.
