= USS Volunteer (ID-3242) =

Cargo ship of the United States Navy

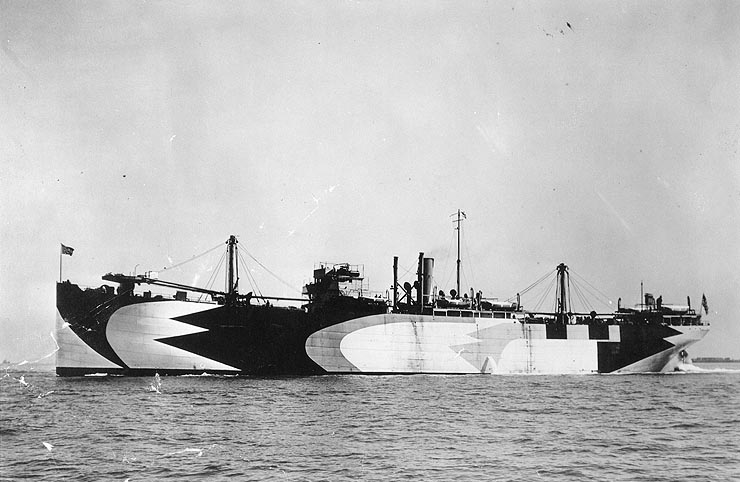
- Cargo ship SS Volunteer in San Francisco Bay, California, at the time of her completion in mid-1918, prior to her commissiong as collier USS Volunteer.

History

United States
- Name: USS Volunteer
- Namesake: Previous name retained
- Builder: Bethlehem Shipbuilding Corporation, Alameda, California
- Launched: 18 May 1918
- Acquired: 23 August 1918
- Commissioned: 23 August 1918
- Decommissioned: 27 February 1919
- Stricken: 27 February 1919
- Fate: Transferred to United States Shipping Board 27 February 1919
- Notes: Operated commercially as SS Volunteer from 1919 to either 1946 or 1948 and as SS Andalusia from 1946 or 1948 until 1949; Wrecked 4 November 1949

General characteristics
- Type: Collier
- Tonnage: 7,955 Gross register tons
- Displacement: 16,100 tons normal
- Length: 410 ft 0 in (124.97 m)
- Beam: 56 ft 0 in (17.07 m)
- Draft: 30 ft 6 in (9.30 m) aft
- Speed: 10.5 knots
- Complement: 70

The second USS Volunteer (ID-3242) was a United States Navy collier in commission from 1918 to 1919.

== Construction acquisition, and commissioning ==
SS Volunteer was built for the United States Shipping Board as a cargo ship by the Bethlehem Shipbuilding Corporation at Alameda, California, and launched on 18 May 1918. She was earmarked for U.S. Navy World War I service with the naval registry Identification Number (Id. No.) 3242, and was delivered to the Navy on 23 August 1918. She was commissioned as USS Volunteer the same day.

== United States Navy service ==
Pressed into service as a collier, Volunteer departed San Francisco, California, on 7 September 1918, bound for East Asia. During that voyage, she made port calls at Shanghai, China, and Hong Kong before arriving at Manila on the island of Luzon in the Philippines on 24 October 1918. From there, she moved south to Iloilo on the island of Panay, located in the central Philippines. She reached Iloilo on 6 November 1918 and, after a false start and a return for additional fuel, finally set course back to the United States on 8 December 1918. Volunteer reached Oahu in the Hawaiian Islands on 1 January 1919 and remained in Hawaii until 9 January 1919, when she got underway for the United States East Coast. Volunteer arrived in New York City on 15 February 1919.

On 27 February 1919, Volunteer was simultaneously decommissioned, stricken from the Navy List, and returned to the United States Shipping Board.

== Later career ==
Once again SS Volunteer, the ship remained in the possession of the United States Shipping Board until 1937, when she was sold to the Lykes Brothers-Ripley Steamship Company of New Orleans, Louisiana. That company operated her under the name SS Volunteer until either 1946 or 1948, then sold her to Arm. Transatlantica of Panama. Renamed SS Andalusia, she continued in commercial service until she was wrecked on Waadah Island in the Strait of Juan de Fuca near Cape Flattery, Washington, on 4 November 1949.
