= USS Vision (SP-1114) =

Patrol vessel of the United States Navy

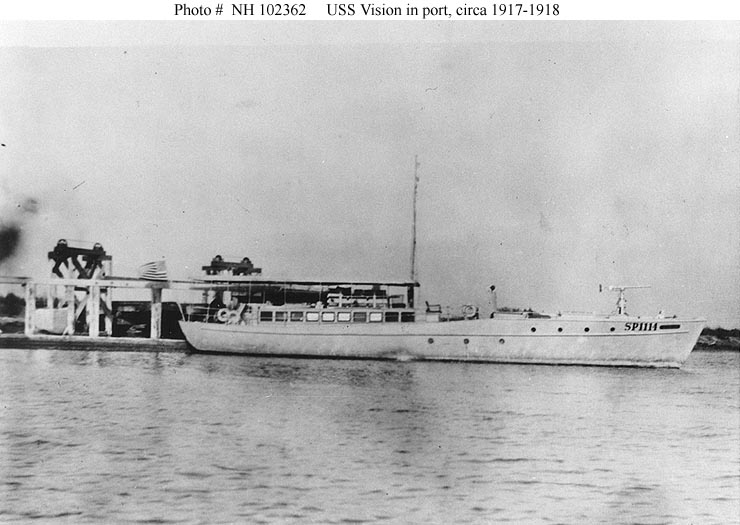
- USS Vision (SP-1114) in port during 1917 or 1918.

History

United States
- Name: USS Vision
- Namesake: Previous name retained
- Builder: William Nelson, Harrisburg, Texas
- Completed: 1910
- Acquired: 27 August 1917
- Commissioned: 27 August 1917
- Decommissioned: 19 December 1918
- Fate: Returned to owner 19 December 1918
- Notes: Operated as private motorboat Vision 1910-1917 and from 1918

General characteristics
- Type: Patrol vessel
- Tonnage: 13 Gross register tons
- Length: 67 ft 6 in (20.57 m)
- Beam: 12 ft 6 in (3.81 m)
- Draft: 4 ft 9 in (1.45 m) mean
- Speed: 12 knots (22 km/h)
- Complement: 9
- Armament: 1 × 1-pounder gun

The second USS Vision (SP-1114) was a United States Navy patrol vessel in commission from 1917 to 1918.

Vision was built as a private, wooden-hulled motorboat of the same name in 1910 by William Nelson at Harrisburg, Texas. On 27 August 1917, the U.S. Navy acquired her under a free lease from her owner, Haywood Nelms, for use as a section patrol boat during World War I. She was commissioned the same day as USS Vision (SP-1114).

Assigned to the 3rd Section, 8th Naval District, Vision operated in the Gulf of Mexico for the rest of World War I, patrolling off the Texas ports of Freeport, Sabine, Palacios, and Galveston. On occasion, she also conducted patrols off the entrance to the Brazos River and in Matagorda Bay.

After the conclusion of World War I, the submarine chaser USS SC-157 towed Vision from Galveston to Harrisburg, Texas. Vision was decommissioned at Harrisburg on 19 December 1918 and returned to her owner the same day.
