= USS Luckenbach =

USS Luckenbach may refer to various United States Navy ships:

- USS Edgar F. Luckenbach (ID-4597), a cargo ship and troop transport in commission from 1918 to 1919
- USS Edward Luckenbach (ID-1662), a cargo ship and troop transport in commission from 1918 to 1919
- USS F. J. Luckenbach (ID-2160), a cargo ship and troop transport in commission from 1918 to 1919
- USS Frederick Luckenbach (1888), a collier in commission from 1918 to 1919
- USS Julia Luckenbach (ID-2407), a cargo ship and troop transport in commission from 1918 to 1919
- USS K. I. Luckenbach (ID-2291), a cargo ship and troop transport in commission from 1918 to 1919
- USS Katrina Luckenbach (ID-3020), a cargo ship and troop transport in commission from 1918 to 1919
- USS Luckenbach Tug No. 1 (ID-1232), a tug commissioned in 1917 and renamed USS Barnegat (ID-1232) 18 days later
- USS Walter A. Luckenbach (ID-3171), a cargo ship and troop transport in commission from 1918 to 1919

== See also ==
- SS J. L. Luckenbach, a commercial cargo ship from 1901 to 1922, formerly the German Saale of 1886
- Luckenbach No. 4, a tug commissioned in 1917 as USS Nahant (SP-1250)
- SS Mary Luckenbach, a commercial cargo ship in service from 1947 to 1959 that previously served in the U.S. Navy as USS Waukesha (AKA-84)
- Edgar F. Luckenbach (1868–1943), businessman and owner of the Luckenbach Steamship Company, Inc.
