= USS Barnegat (SP-1232) =

Tugboat of the United States Navy

History

United States
- Name: USS Barnegat
- Namesake: A bay on the eastern border of Ocean County, New Jersey, about 25 miles in length and separated from the Atlantic Ocean by Island Beach.
- Owner: Luckenbach Steamship Co
- Builder: John H. Dialogue, Camden, New Jersey
- Laid down: date unknown
- Christened: as Luckenbach Tug No. 1
- Acquired: by the Navy on 12 October 1917
- Commissioned: 12 October 1917 as Luckenbach Tug No. 1 (SP 1232)
- Decommissioned: 28 November 1919 at Norfolk, Virginia
- Renamed: USS Barnegat 30 October 1917
- Stricken: circa 28 November 1919
- Homeport: Brest, France
- Fate: Transferred to the War Department 17 August 1920; subsequently operated in the Delaware River by the Army’s Corps of Engineers

General characteristics
- Type: Tugboat
- Displacement: 900 tons
- Length: 138 ft 9 in (42.29 m)
- Beam: 27 ft (8.2 m)
- Draft: 18 ft (5.5 m)
- Speed: 11.75 knots
- Complement: 40 officers and enlisted
- Armament: One 3" gun; Two Colt machine guns

The first USS Barnegat (SP-1232) was a commercial tugboat acquired by the U.S. Navy during World War I. She was armed with a 3-inch gun and sent to Brest, France, to perform towing services for Allied ships. Post-war, she returned to the United States, was decommissioned, and was subsequently used on the Delaware River by the U.S. Army Corps of Engineers.

== Built in Camden, New Jersey ==
The first ship to be so named by the U.S. Navy, Barnegat (Id. No. 1232) was a steel-hulled, single-screw, ocean-going tug. Originally built for the Luckenbach Steamship Co., Luckenbach Tug No. 1 was completed in 1891 at Camden, New Jersey, by John H. Dialogue. The Navy acquired her "for distant service" on 12 October 1917, assigned her the identification number (Id. No.) 1232, and earmarked her for duty "as a tug to tow large disabled vessels".

Luckenbach Tug No. 1 was commissioned on 12 October 1917. On 30 October 1917, General Order No. 334 directed that Luckenbach Tug No. 1 be renamed Barnegat "at once".

== World War I service ==
=== Crossing the Atlantic Ocean ===
Barnegat fitted out at the New York Navy Yard, Brooklyn, New York, and was detailed, on 20 November 1917, to accompany the armed yacht Nokomis (Id. No. 609) to the Azores, towing submarine chasers. Dispatch traffic, however, indicates difficulties in finding certain items of equipment to be installed on board, the Commander, Naval Station, New York, informing the Navy Department that Barnegat and Montauk (Id.No.1213) still needed binnacles and standard compasses as of 11 December, but prognosticated that both ships would be ready to sail on the 12th. Barnegat ultimately departed New York City for the Philadelphia Navy Yard, there to complete preparations "for distant service" and thence to await onward routing.

=== At sea mechanical problems ===
Barnegat—with the French submarine chaser SC-171 in tow—departed the Delaware Capes on 22 December 1917, bound for Bermuda, as part of a small flotilla of armed tugs and yachts ordered to deliver six submarine chasers built in American shipyards to the French government. Venetia (Id. No. 431), the flagship for the convoy, towed SC-67, Lydonia (Id. No. 700), SC-173; Montauk, SC-29, and Gypsum Queen (Id. No. 430), SC-170 and SC-172.

One day out, on the afternoon of 23 December, Lydonia reported boiler trouble. Consequently, Comdr. Louis B. Porterfield, the group's commanding officer, ordered Montauk to release SC 29 and to take Lydonia and her charge, SC-173, astern, and directed Barnegat to pick up SC 29. While Venetia stood by, her starboard whaleboat ready to assist the tug if necessary, Barnegat’s sailors got the towline on board the French craft at 1600. Then, as Montauk and her disabled charge returned toward Norfolk, Virginia, the little flotilla again set course for Bermuda.

During the mid-watch on Christmas Day, however, Barnegat and her tows dropped so far astern of the convoy that Venetia, with SC-67 still riding at the end of the towline astern, began searching for them. Hailing Gypsum Queen close at hand on her port beam, Venetia signaled to "stay close…and keep in sight". At less than a half-hour into the morning watch, at 0425, Venetia spotted a light on her starboard bow and began steering toward it. No sooner had the convoy flagship made contact with her one prodigal, but Gypsum Queen, that had fallen astern during the search for Barnegat, dropped below the horizon.

Barnegat soon informed Venetia of her difficulties, promising to be ready to proceed in about two hours. Eventually, by 0945 on Christmas Day, the tug was underway and steaming slowly; by the midpoint in the morning watch, the convoy was on course and together again, with Venetia’s log containing the notation that she was steaming various courses and various speeds "to keep in touch with the tugs".

=== Regrouping at Bermuda ===
The little convoy reached Bermuda shortly before the start of the mid watch on 27 December, with Barnegat bringing up the rear; a strong northeasterly wind and nearly continuous rain made the reception chilly and damp, but eventually all of the ships and their tows were safely anchored in Great Sound. Barnegat then shifted to His Majesty's Dockyard, Bermuda, on the afternoon of the 29th.

Barnegat’s executive officer visited Venetia on the morning of the 31st; presumably the topic of conversation was voyage repairs, for that afternoon the "exec" returned to the ship with an officer from Prometheus (Repair Ship No. 2). On New Year's Day, 1918, Ensign John Alexander, USNRF, was detached from Venetia with orders to command Barnegat.

Venetia later transferred foodstuffs to Barnegat via Prometheus’s motor sailer on 5 January, the day that the tug quit the dockyard to anchor in Great Sound. More conferences between commanding officers ensued, probably dealing with the next leg of the voyage, that commenced as the flotilla took departure on 7 January 1918 for the Azores.

Forming a line of divisions with Venetia in the lead, again towing SC-67; Nokomis and Galatea (SP-714) followed, as did Penobscot (Id. No. 982), Nahant (Id. No. 1250) and Concord (Id. No.773); Barnegat and Gypsum Queen brought up the rear.

=== Stopping in the Azores ===
By the time that Barnegat reached Ponta Delgada, Azores, in late January, plans were being broached for her future employment. Vice Admiral William S. Sims, Commander, U.S. Naval Forces in European Waters, suggested to the Chief of Naval Operations that the majority of vessels assigned to the western bases be tugs. Consequently, he contemplated sending, about 25 January, Barnegat (among other vessels) to the French coast to base at Brest.

She left the dockyard on 5 January; and the flotilla sortied for the Azores two days later. The convoy reached Punta Delgada late in the month, and Barnegat operated in and around that island group into the spring. Highlights of her Azores duty were a run to Horta, Fayal, to tow French submarine chaser SC 28 to Punta Delgada and a cruise in nearby waters to search for the troopship Hancock. Barnegat, with Gypsum Queen and two French subchasers, cleared the Azores early in the spring and proceeded to France. Upon their arrival at Brest on 23 April 1918, Barnegat and Gypsum Queen were assigned to Division 9, Patrol Force.

=== Homeport in Brest, France ===
Barnegat operated with that organization through the Armistice, towing vessels that ranged from lighters to battleships and transports. Continuing to operate out of Brest after the fighting ended, she added work as a dispatch vessel and as a passenger ferry to her duties as a tug. Toward the end of her service in Europe, she embarked a party of motion picture photographers on 7 August to film the gigantic transport Leviathan.

Barnegat got underway on 24 September 1919 in company with Bella (Id. No. 2211) and Nahant, bound for the Azores. However, less than 24 hours out, she accidentally rammed and holed Nahant. Then she and Bella stood by their damaged consort until they escorted her back to Brest.

While she waited for Nahant to complete repairs, Barnegat conducted harbor operations through the first fortnight of October.

=== Returning to Norfolk, Virginia ===
The same trio again left French waters on 15 October. After a brief stop at Punta Delgada, they encountered heavy seas and gale-force winds. Experiencing engine difficulties in the predawn darkness of 3 November, the tug radioed her plight to Bella and bridled her bow for towing. Nahant passed a hawser to the tug and Barnegat remained under tow until late the next afternoon when she was again able to proceed under her own power.

A few days later, Nahant suffered propulsion difficulties and Barnegat closely accompanied her to Bermuda. They got underway once more on 24 November and reached Norfolk four days later.

== Post-war disposition ==
Although no record of Barnegat's decommissioning has been found, she was probably inactivated on the day of her arrival at Norfolk or very soon thereafter. The last entry in her log was made on that day. The tug was moved to Philadelphia in February 1920 and lay in the navy yard there until 17 August 1920 when she was ordered transferred to the War Department.

Thereafter, she was operated in the Delaware River by the Army Corps of Engineers. After 1923, her name disappeared from lists of vessels owned by the Federal Government.
