= SS Edward Luckenbach =

US cargo ship

Coordinates: 24°57.830′N 81°53.270′W

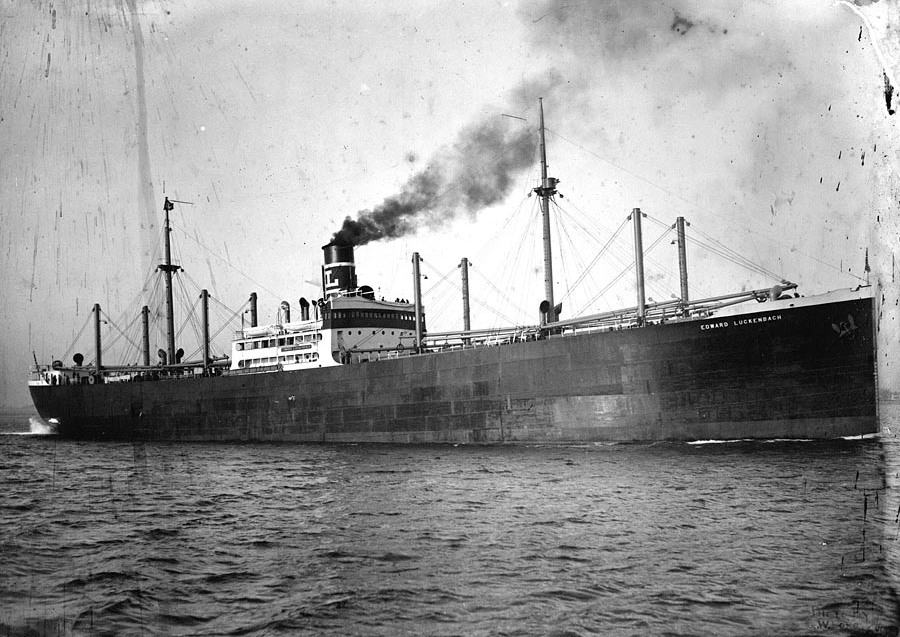
- SS Edward Luckenbach around the time of her completion in 1916.

History
- Name: Edward Luckenbach
- Owner: Luckenbach Steamship Company
- Builder: Fore River Shipbuilding Corporation, Quincy, Massachusetts
- Yard number: 248
- Launched: 14 September 1916
- Acquired: 28 November 1916 (delivery)
- Commissioned: Navy: 29 August 1918
- Decommissioned: Navy: 6 August 1919
- Identification: U.S. Official Number: 214560; Signal: LGMP (1918); WLCB (1941)
- Fate: Sunk by mines 1 July 1942
- Notes: Commercial cargo ship 1916–1942; WW I chartered Army transport May 1917—August 1918, commissioned Navy transport August 1918-August 1919.

General characteristics
- Type: Cargo ship and troop transport
- Tonnage: 8,151 GRT, 6,141 NRT (1918); 7,943 GRT, 5,934 NRT (1921); 7,934 GRT, 5,041 NRT (1941)
- Displacement: 15,963 tons
- Length: 456 ft 5 in (139.12 m) (overall); 449 ft 3 in (136.9 m) (waterline); 436.6 ft (133.1 m) (registry)
- Beam: 57 ft 2 in (17.42 m)
- Draft: 32 ft (9.8 m)
- Installed power: 3 X single ended boilers,
- Propulsion: geared turbine, 4,000 s.h.p., 4,500 max s.h.p.
- Speed: 15 knots
- Complement: 62
- Armament: 2 × 5 in (127 mm) guns

SS Edward Luckenbach was the first of five new cargo ships to be built for the Luckenbach Steamship Company by Fore River Shipbuilding Corporation. The ship was launched in September 1916, delivered in November and briefly operated as such before being requisitioned for World War I service. The ship was one of the cargo vessels in the first large convoy transporting U.S. Army forces to France. After that convoy the ship served as a U.S. Army Chartered Transport (USACT) until converted by the Army to a troop ship and turned over to the Navy a few months before the war's end. The Navy commissioned the ship as USS Edward Luckenbach assigning the miscellaneous identification number ID-1662 in August 1918. The transport made one wartime voyage with continued voyages returning the Army to the U.S. until August 1919.

Edward Luckenbach was returned to the company before mid September, 1919, resuming commercial service, mainly between New York and San Francisco. The ship sank 1 July 1942 after mistakenly enterering a defensive minefield north of Key West, Florida and striking two mines.

== Construction and acquisition ==
Edward Luckenbach, the first of five steam turbine driven cargo ships, was built as hull 248 and launched 14 September 1916 by Fore River Shipbuilding Corporation at Quincy, Massachusetts for Luckenbach Steamship Company of New York City. (Note: The five ships in order with Fore River hull number were Edward Luckenbach (248), Julia Luckenbach (251), K. I. Luckenbach (264), F. J. Luckenbach (265) and Katrina Luckenbach (267).)

The ship had a central deck house and bridge with a single stack with two masts and eight king posts was "novel" at the time. Three single ended, oil fired, boilers each with four corrugated furnaces and a total heating area of 10,500 sq ft (975.5 m^{2}) provided steam for a single geared turbine with a high and low speed reduction gear designed for 4,000 shaft horsepower at 90 revolutions. At maximum 93 revolutions the shaft horsepower was rated at 4,500. The propeller was 19 ft (5.8 m) in diameter with an adjustable pitch between 15 ft (4.6 m) and 17 ft (5.2 m) set at 16 ft (4.9 m).

Edward Luckenbach was registered with U.S. Official Number 214560, signal LGMP at New York, New York, as a three deck ship, 8,151 GRT, 6,141 NRT, 436.6 ft (133.1 m) registry length, 57.2 ft (17.4 m) beam and 28 ft (8.5 m) depth.

== Service history ==
Edward Luckenbach was delivered to the Luckenbach Steamship Company on 28 November 1916 for commercial cargo operation. By early May of the next year a decision was made to send an Army to France with orders to sail by June 1917. The interned ships of Germany and her allies had been seized, but many were damaged by the interned crews with major repairs needed. The only choice was to requisition U.S. merchant vessels for Army charter use. Edward Luckenbach was among the fourteen vessels selected by industry experts after a survey of the U.S. registry with sufficient bunker capacity and speed for the service and which were quickly available. The ship was discharging cargo at Philadelphia and arrived at New York 31 May 1917 to be placed under Army charter. On 17 July 1917 Edward Luckenbach departed New York in the fourth element, which had been delayed awaiting last minute dispatches and stores, of the first large convoys transporting the American Expeditionary Forces (A.E.F.) to France. (Note: Table showing ships by group.)

After the initial convoy the ship served as the United States Army Chartered Transport USACT Edward Luckenbach until the just before the Armistice after which she was transferred by the United States Shipping Board to the Navy. During that time a ship's cook deserted in New York and appealed his trial by court martial for desertion. The appeal was rejected as he was determined to be "a person serving with the Armies of the United States in the field" and subject to trial by military authorities.

=== U.S. Navy service ===
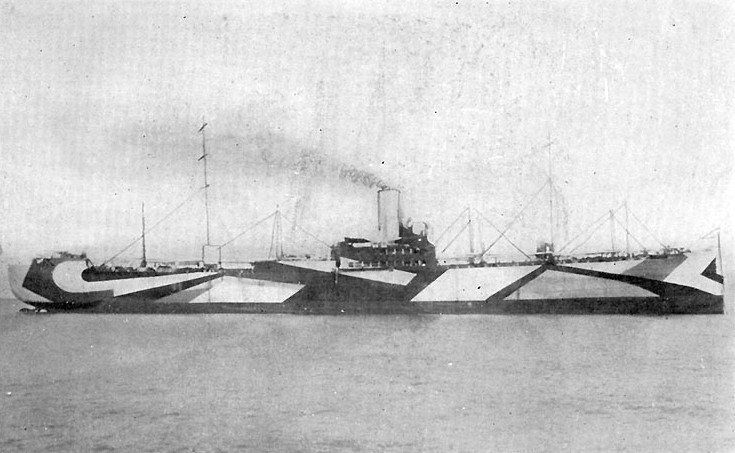
USS Edward Luckenbach as a cargo ship in 1918.

The Shipping Board transferred her to the U.S. Navy World War I service on 29 August 1918. Assigned Identification Number (Id. No.) 1662, she was commissioned the same day as USS Edward Luckenbach. The ship was assigned to the Naval Overseas Transportation Service and departed New York City on 18 September 1918 for Marseille, France, carrying United States Army cargo. By the time she returned to New York on 22 November 1918, the war had been over for eleven days, so it was her only wartime voyage as a U.S. Navy ship. The ship was converted by the Army to a troop transport. As a troop transport the ship was rated at 12,250 DWT for transport of 17 officers and 2,244 enlisted personnel.

On 18 December 1918, Edward Luckenbach was transferred to the Newport News Division of the Cruiser and Transport Force for postwar use as a troop transport. After conversion into a transport, she made three voyages in 1919 from New York and Newport News, Virginia, with cargo for St. Nazaire, France, returning with patients, convalescents, troops, and casuals to the United States.

Edward Luckenbach was unable to continue her fourth voyage to Europe – this time from Hampton Roads, Virginia – because of engine trouble. She was lying disabled in mid-ocean in the Atlantic on 15 July 1919 when troop transport USS Arizonan – herself four days outbound on a voyage from Brooklyn, New York, to St. Nazaire, France – encountered her. Arizonan towed her 425 nautical miles (787 km) toward Boston, Massachusetts. The United States Coast Guard cutter USCGC Ossipee joined the two troop transports on the afternoon of 17 July 1919. On the morning of 19 July 1919, Ossipee took over the towing duty from Arizonan, freeing Arizonan to continue on her voyage to France.

After arriving at Boston under tow, Edward Luckenbach was decommissioned on 6 August 1919 and delivered to the Shipping Board the same day for return to Luckenbach Steamship Company.

=== Later career ===
Edward Luckenbach was among those released to owners in September 1919, to resume commercial service as a cargo ship. In 1921 the ship set a cargo ship record from New York to San Francisco with total elapsed time of 18 days with time in transit, excluding time in Los Angeles for cargo, of 15 days, 11 hours.

She ran aground at Block Island, Rhode Island, on 10 January 1930, but was refloated on 5 March 1930 and returned to service. On 17 February 1937, she was beached after she collided with the Italian cargo ship Feltre in the Columbia River at Rainier, Oregon. She eventually was refloated and again returned to service.

Edward Luckenbach was delivered to the War Shipping Administration (WSA) for World War II operations on 3 March 1942 to be operated by Luckenbach as WSA's agent. On 1 July 1942 the ship mistakenly entered a defensive minefield five miles off Smith Shoal Light, about 11 miles (18 km) north-northwest of Key West, Florida, struck two mines and sank. One crew member was killed. The ship sank with the superstructure above water and the 41 surviving crew and 12 man Navy Armed Guard re-board the next day. They were transported to Key West by patrol craft. One of the first major salvage operations for Harjurand (ARS-31) was recovery of cargo from the wreck. The operation, involving other salvage ships, lasted from 28 March to 8 December 1943. Harjurand transported some 4,500 tons of the recovered ore to Tampa, Florida to be used in the war effort. (Note: The Harjurand DANFS apparently mistakenly notes the cause of the sinking was "torpedo".) The ship itself was declared a Constructive Total Loss (CTL).

A large quantity of tungsten was salvaged from the wreck, and the wreck was surveyed using the wire-drag technique to prevent it from being a hazard to navigation. The wreck is scattered over a wide area in 65 feet (20 m) of water.
