= USS Washington =

USS Washington may refer to:

Ships named in honor of George Washington:

- USS Washington (1775) was a brigantine acquired in October 1775 and captured by the Royal Navy in December the same year
- USS Washington (1776 row galley) was a row galley acquired in January 1776 with an unknown fate after August the same year
- USS Washington (1776 frigate) was one of 13 frigates authorized by the Continental Congress, launched in August 1776; and scuttled in November 1777 to prevent capture
- USS Washington (1776 lateen-rigged galley) was a galley built and subsequently captured by the Royal Navy in October 1776
- USS Washington (1814) was a ship of the line on active service from 1815 to 1820
- USRC Washington (1833) was a revenue cutter launched in 1833 and sold in June 1837

Ships or boats named in honor of the State of Washington:

- USS Washington (ACR-11) was a Tennessee-class armored cruiser, launched in 1905, renamed Seattle in 1916, reclassified as a heavy cruiser in 1920; and scrapped 1946
- USS Washington (BB-47) was a Colorado-class battleship launched in 1921 and sunk as a gunnery target in 1924 after her construction was halted in 1922
- USS Washington (BB-56) was a North Carolina-class battleship launched in 1940, decommissioned in 1947, and scrapped in 1961
- USS Washington (SSN-787) is a Virginia-class submarine launched in 2016

Others:

- USRC Washington (1837), was a revenue cutter named after Peter G. Washington, Assistant Secretary of the Treasury. The ship was launched in 1837 and seized by Confederate Navy in June 1861.
- Washington (SP-1241), was a United States Navy seagoing coal barge during 1917

== See also ==
- USS George Washington
- USS Lady Washington
- USS Martha Washington
- USS Mount Washington
