= Gypsum Queen =

A number of ships have been named Gypsum Queen, including:

- SS Gypsum Queen, a British merchant ships sunk during World War II whilst a member of Convoy SC 42
- USS Gypsum Queen (SP-430)
