= USS F. J. Luckenbach =

Cargo ship of the United States Navy

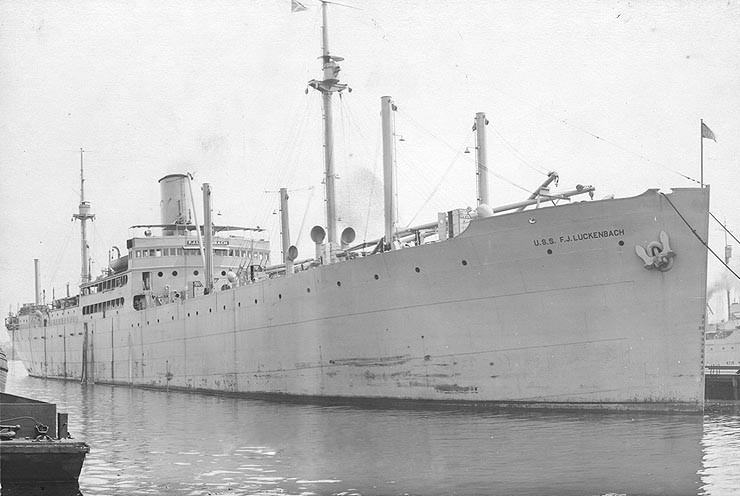
- USS F. J. Luckenbach at Boston, Massachusetts, on 18 June 1919.

History

United States
- Name: USS F. J. Luckenbach
- Namesake: Previous name retained
- Builder: Fore River Shipbuilding Corporation, Quincy, Massachusetts
- Launched: 15 September 1917
- Completed: 28 November 1917
- Acquired: 9 January 1918
- Commissioned: 9 January 1918
- Decommissioned: 18 August 1919
- Fate: Transferred to United States Shipping Board 18 August 1919; Returned to owner; Scrapped 1951
- Notes: Served as commercial cargo ship SS F. J. Luckenbach 1919–1951

General characteristics
- Type: Cargo ship and troop transport
- Tonnage: 8,074 Gross register tons
- Displacement: 15,650 tons (normal)
- Length: 468 ft 4 in (142.75 m)
- Beam: 56 ft (17 m)
- Draft: 30 ft 6 in (9.30 m)
- Propulsion: Steam engine
- Speed: 13 knots
- Complement: 92
- Armament: 1 × 6-inch (152-millimeter) gun; 1 × 3-inch (76.2-millimeter) gun

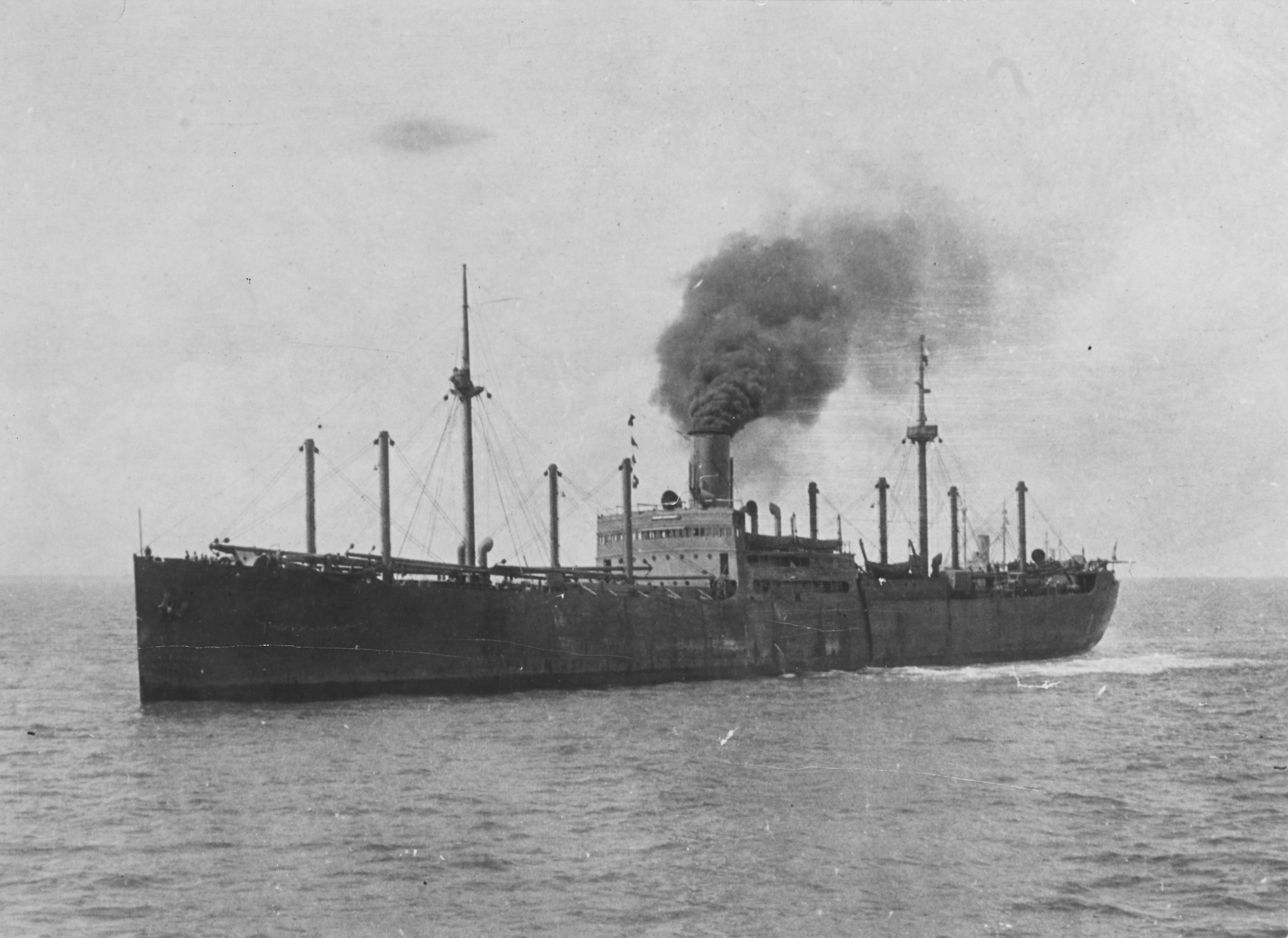
USS F. J. Luckenbach, probably in 1919.

USS F. J. Luckenbach (ID-2160) was a cargo ship and troop transport that served in the United States Navy from 1918 to 1919. SS F. J. Luckenbach was built as a commercial cargo ship at Quincy, Massachusetts, by Fore River Shipbuilding Corporation for Luckenbach Steamship Company of New York City. Launched on 15 September 1917, she was delivered to Luckenbach on 28 November 1917. She then came under the control of the United States Shipping Board. The Shipping Board transferred her to the U.S. Navy for World War I service on 9 January 1918. Assigned Identification Number (Id. No.) 2160, she was commissioned the same day as USS F. J. Luckenbach .

== World War I ==
Outfitted as an animal transport, F. J. Luckenbach carried horses, mules, and general United States Army cargo on five voyages to France from New York City between 12 February 1918 and 21 February 1919. She was then converted for postwar troop transport duty, and made two voyages to return troops of the American Expeditionary Force from Europe to the United States between April 1919 and July 1919.

== Post World War I ==
Decommissioned on 18 August 1919, F. J. Luckenbach was transferred to the Shipping Board the same day for return to her owner. Once again SS F. J. Luckenbach, she resumed commercial service as a cargo ship.

== War Relief and Sea Going Cowboys ==
In 1946 after World War II the F. J. Luckenbach was used as livestock ship, also called a cowboy ship. From 1945 to 1947 the United Nations Relief and Rehabilitation Administration and the Brethren Service Committee of the Church of the Brethren sent livestock to war-torn countries. These "seagoing cowboys" made about 360 trips on 73 different ships. The Heifers for Relief project was started by the Church of the Brethren in 1942; in 1953 this became Heifer International. The SS F. J. Luckenbach was one of these ships, known as cowboy ships, as she moved livestock across the Atlantic Ocean. The F. J. Luckenbach made trips horses, several thousand baby chicks and hay bales to Poland on each trip. F. J. Luckenbach moved horses, heifers, and mules as well as some chicks, rabbits, and goats.

She was scrapped in 1951.

- Note: There were 3 ships named F. J. Luckenbach. One built in 1886 by R. Thompson & Son, Southwick at 2,472 tons, missing-sank in 1914. The other built in 1943 by Western Pipe & Steel Company of California at 7,888 tons.

== Sister ships ==
F. J. Luckenbach was the fourth of five sister ships built by the Fore River Shipbuilding Corporation, Quincy, Massachusetts. Each were converted to transports for WW1 from 1918 to 1919. The five ships were:

- Edward Luckenbach yard hull #248, Navy ID-1662 – sank 1 July 1942 after mistakenly entering a defensive minefield north of Key West, Florida
- Julia Luckenbach yard hull #251, Navy ID-2407 – Badly damaged September 1943, declared constructive total loss
- K. I. Luckenbach yard hull #264, Navy ID-2291 scrapped in 1954
- F. J. Luckenbach yard hull #265, Navy ID-2160 - this ship
- Katrina Luckenbach yard hull #267, Navy ID-3020 - scrapped in 1953
