= Howard Pease =

American novelist

Howard Pease (September 6, 1894 – April 14, 1974) was an American writer of adventure stories from Stockton, California. Most of his stories revolved around a young protagonist, Joseph Todhunter ("Tod") Moran, who shipped out on tramp freighters during the interwar years.

== Life ==
Pease was born in Stockton on September 6, 1894. For most of his life he resided in the San Francisco, California, area, except for those times when he shipped out as a member of the crew on a freighter, searching for new material.

Pease decided to become a writer while in the sixth grade, and he wrote his first short story in 1907 during that school year. He attended Stanford University in Stanford, California, interrupted his studies for two years of United States Army service in Europe, then returned to graduate. During two summers, he shipped out as a wiper in the engine room of a cargo ship.

Pease's first published work was a short story that appeared in the June 1921 edition of the children's magazine The American Boy. He wrote his first novel, The Gypsy Caravan, in the early 1920s, although it was not published until 1930, when it became his fourth published novel. His first published novel was The Tattooed Man, based on two of his voyages and on a walking trip he took along the south coast of France from Marseille to Italy; it appeared in 1926, and introduced Tod Moran, a young merchant mariner who is the protagonist in most of Pease's novels, working his way up from wiper to first mate as the novels – sometimes referred to as "the Tod Moran mysteries" – progress. Recurring characters in the Tod Moran novels are his friends in the "black gang" (slang for the engine room crew), Toppy, a Cockney deckhand, and Sven, a Swede, as well as Captain Jarvis, master of the freighter Araby and a father figure to Tod.

By the late 1930s, Pease had written The Gypsy Caravan, Secret Cargo, and eight Tod Moran novels. He wanted to branch out beyond the creative constraints imposed by the Tod Moran series, but his editor at Doubleday insisted that he continue to write Tod Moran books exclusively. In response, he wrote Captain Binnacle and The Long Wharf, leading her to relent and allow him to write more on topics others than the adventures of Tod Moran. However, he continued the Tod Moran series as well; indeed, the last of his 22 published novels, Mystery on Telegraph Hill, was a Tod Moran mystery published in 1961.

In addition to writing children's stories, Pease taught high school English and in the mid-1940s was the principal at Los Altos Elementary School. He also contributed to journals and reviewed books for The New York Times.

Pease died in San Rafael, California, on April 14, 1974.

== Influence ==
Philip Roth, Russell Freedman, Michael Dirda and E. L. Doctorow all cited Pease's stories as childhood influences. Actor Richard Crenna as a youth, would often take the bus line to Los Angeles City Library to read Howard Pease Tod Moran stories. Reflected Dirda: "For a long period also I sought out the work of Howard Pease, old-fashioned nautical adventures teeming with frequent and arcane allusions to bilge, Lascars, and fo'csles." Freedman, who won the Newbery Medal and valued realism and accuracy in children's writing, called Pease his "literary hero."

== Pease and children's literature ==
Pease was strongly critical of the 1930s world of children's literature (in which he worked) which he stated was a "wholly and solely a woman's world—a completely feminine world" subject to "tender-minded feminine control." Pease believed that this resulted in a paucity of male authors, depressed wages and a lack of realism in children's stories. Pease expounded these views in an address he delivered in 1939 at an American Library Association "pre-conference" moderated by Frances Clarke Sayers. While the audience of 400 female librarians concurred with Pease that the lack of male authors and of social realism was a problem, his overall misogynistic tone offended many and damaged his case. Nevertheless, Pease's speech provoked discussion in the field and led to, among other things, a review of the criteria by which the Newbery Medal winner was selected. Pease remained interested in the question of realism in children's literature and corresponded with other authors on the topic, including noted librarian Julia Sauer. In a reversal, a modern critic took Pease to task for creating "traditional" male heroes who were "brave, clever and independent."

== Awards ==
Pease received two literary awards during his life. In 1944, he received the California Commonwealth Book Award for his novel Thunderbolt House, published that year, and in 1946 he was awarded the Children's Book Award (now the Bank Street College of Education, Children's Book Committee's Josette Frank Award) from the Child Study Association of America "for a book that deals realistically with problems in the child's world" for his novel Heart of Danger of that year.

== Papers ==
Pease's papers are held at the University of the Pacific in Stockton, California.

== Bibliography ==
- The Tattooed Man (1926) – "A fantastic cook adds to the excitement of Tod Moran's trip on a freighter from San Francisco to the Mediterranean" (from the series' dust jacket).
- The Jinx Ship (1927) – The tramp steamer Congo lives up to her sinister reputation when Tod Moran defies sailor superstition to ship as a wiper.
- Shanghai Passage (1929) – Mutiny, mystery, and revolution on a tramp steamer bound for the China coast. (Tod Moran Mystery)
- The Gypsy Caravan (1930) - Betty and Joe meet adventure while traveling with gypsies and meet Robin Hood, Richard the Lionhearted, Roland, and other legendary and historical figures along the way
- Secret Cargo (1931) - The Story of Larry Matthews and his dog Sambo
- The Ship Without a Crew (1934) - Mystery in the South Pacific (Tod Moran Mystery)
- Wind in the Rigging (1935) - An Adventurous Voyage of Tod Moran on the Tramp Steamer "Sumatra" New York to North Africa
- Hurricane Weather (1936) - Tod Moran goes on a sailing vacation in the South Pacific, semi-sequel to The Ship Without a Crew
- Foghorns (1937) - A Story of the San Francisco Waterfront (Tod Moran Mystery)
- Captain Binnacle (1938) - Three children and an old sea captain put their imaginations to work for pretend adventures aboard the stranded vessel on which the sea captain makes his home
- Jungle River (1938) - Don Carter searches for his father in the jungle of New Guinea
- Highroad to Adventure (1939) - "What Happened to Tod Moran when he Traveled South into Old Mexico"
- Long Wharf (1939) - "A Story of Young San Francisco"
- The Black Tanker (1941) - "The Adventures of a Landlubber on the Ill-fated Last Voyage of the Oil Tank Steamer ZAMBORA" (A Tod Moran Mystery)
- Night Boat (1942) - A collection of Tod Moran short stories originally published in magazines.
- Thunderbolt House (1944) - A mystery set in San Francisco in 1905, semi-sequel to Long Wharf
- Heart of Danger (1946) - Tod Moran's adventures in Nazi occupied France.
- Bound for Singapore (1948) - "Being A True And Faithful Account Of The Making Of An Adventurer"
- The Dark Adventure (1950) - Johnny Stevens gets amnesia while hitchhiking - minor-character overlap with Highroad to Adventure
- Captain of the Araby (1953) - Tod Moran returns to the South Pacific
- Shipwreck (1957) - "The Strange Adventures of Renny Mitchum, Mess Boy of the Trading Schooner SAMARANG"
- Mystery on Telegraph Hill (1961) - A Tod Moran Mystery set on the foggy hills of San Francisco

== See also ==
- SS K. I. Luckenbach, one of the ships Pease served on
