= USS W. F. Babcock =

Collier of the United States Navy

History

United States
- Name: USS W. F. Babcock
- Namesake: Previous name retained
- Builder: A. Sewall and Company, Bath, Maine
- Launched: 1882
- Acquired: 18 October 1917
- Commissioned: 8 November 1917
- Stricken: 20 November 1919
- Fate: Sold 20 November 1919
- Notes: Operated as seagoing barge before her U.S. Navy service

General characteristics
- Type: Collier
- Tonnage: 2,128 long tons (2,162 t) gross
- Length: 240 ft 10 in (73.41 m)
- Beam: 43 ft 9 in (13.34 m)
- Draft: 26 ft 8 in (8.13 m) mean; 19 ft 4 in (5.89 m) dph
- Sail plan: Schooner-rigged
- Complement: 6
- Armament: None

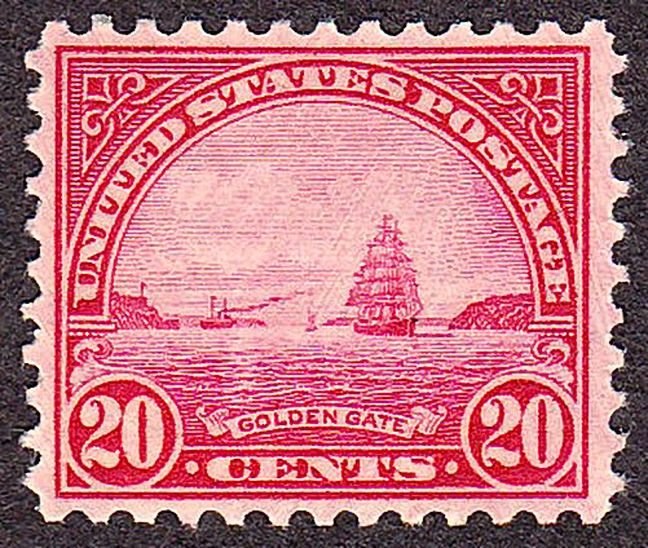
The USS W. F. Babcock sailing through the Golden Gate

USS W. F. Babcock (ID-1239) was a collier that served in the United States Navy from 1917-1919.

W. F. Babcock was a wooden-hulled, schooner-rigged barge launched in 1882 at Bath, Maine by A. Sewall and Company. On 13 April 1917 she went ashore on Monomoy Point, Massachusetts. Refloated and returned to service. She was acquired by the U.S. Navy from the Luckenbach Steamship Company on 18 October 1917 for service in World War I. Given Id. No. 1239 and commissioned on 8 November 1917, W. F. Babcock operated as a collier at the 5th Naval District until 8 August 1918, when she was assigned to the Naval Overseas Transportation Service (NOTS). Plying the United States East Coast between New England and Norfolk, Virginia. W. F. Babcock served as a coastwise collier through the end of World War I. Reassigned to the 1st Naval District on 15 August 1919, she was struck from the Naval Vessel Register on 20 November and simultaneously sold to Reinhard and Hall. Her name disappeared from the shipping registers about that time. Sailing in the Golden Gate it appears on the 20 cent postage stamp issued in 1923.
