= USS Harjurand =

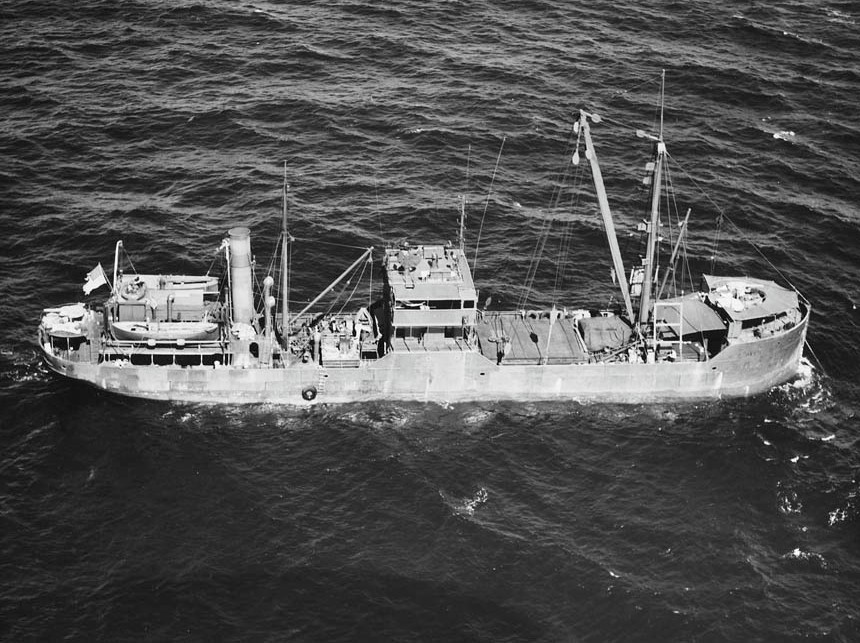
- Harjurand underway, 23 May 1943

History

United States
- Laid down: not known
- Launched: as SS Olesa, 1919
- Acquired: 1 June 1942
- Commissioned: 1 June 1942
- Decommissioned: 22 May 1946
- Stricken: 19 June 1946
- Fate: Sold to Panama, scrapped 1955

General characteristics
- Displacement: 812 tons
- Length: 188 ft 6 in (57.45 m)
- Beam: 32 ft 11 in (10.03 m)
- Draught: 13 ft 6 in (4.11 m)
- Propulsion: coal-fired steam turbine
- Speed: 7 knots

USS Harjurand (ARS-31) was a rescue and salvage ship acquired by the U.S. Navy during World War II. Her task was to come to the aid of stricken vessels.

== Service career ==
Harjurand was built as Olesa in 1919 by Astilleros Cardona, S.A., Barcelona, Spain. She had a long and varied merchant career, serving in the 1920s as Per Skogland under Estonian registry, 1931–32 as Camberway for the British Sunderland Steam Shipping Co., in 1933 as Tento, in 1934 as Marpot, and finally under Estonian ownership again as Harjurand in 1937. Requisitioned by the United States' War Shipping Administration (WSA), she was turned over to the United States Navy on 1 June 1942. Although Navy owned, she was operated under contract by Merritt Chapman, and Scott, under the supervision of the U.S. Bureau of Ships.

Harjurand was one of the pioneer vessels in the Navy's very successful World War II Salvage Service. One of her first major operations was the salvage of cargo from Edward Luckenbach mined off Florida on 1 July 1942. Harjurand and other salvage ships worked from 28 March to 8 December 1943 at the difficult job of bringing up her valuable cargo of metal ores, and Harjurand succeeded in carrying some 4,500 tons of the recovered ore to Tampa, Florida, to be utilized in the war effort. For most of the next 18 months, Harjurand was engaged mainly in removing protruding parts of sunken hulks which threatened navigation off the East Coast of the United States. She worked on SS Gulfamerica off Jacksonville, Florida, April 1944, SS Ashkabad at sea east of Georgia in June, SS Maurice Tracy off South Carolina in August, and the destroyer USS Sturtevant off the Florida Keys during April 1945.

At the close of the war, to which the old coal-burning Harjurand had contributed much, the contract with Merritt Chapman, and Scott was terminated and the ship was returned to the WSA on 22 May 1946. She was stricken from the Navy List on 19 June 1946. Subsequently, Harjurand was sold to Miraflores, S.A., of Panama, and resumed merchant service until 1955 as Dodecanese. She was scrapped at Jacksonville on 3 October 1955.
