= USS Radnor =

Cargo ship of the United States Navy

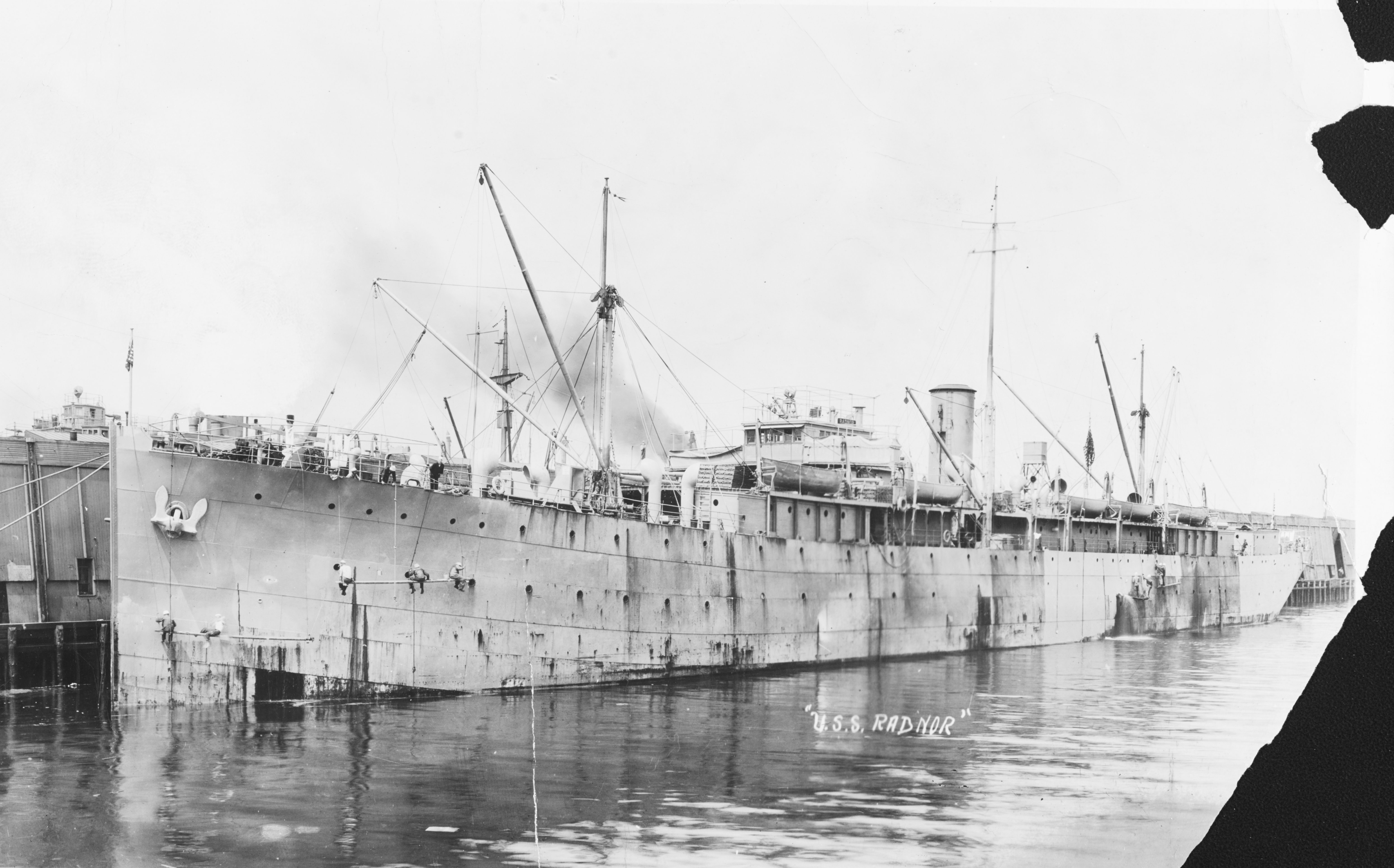
- USS Radnor (ID-3023) being repainted while in port, 1919

History

United States
- Name: USS Radnor
- Owner: U.S. Navy (Apr 1918 – Oct 1919); U.S. Shipping Board (1919–30); Luckenbach SSC (1930–47); China Overseas Lines (1947–50); Pacific Union Marine Corp. (1950–55); Pacific Bulk Carrier Inc. (1955–59)
- Operator: U.S. Navy (Apr 1918 – Oct 1919); Sigsbee, Humphrey & Co. (1920-25); American Pioneer Lines (1925); Barber Line (1926-30); Luckenbach SSC (1930–47); China Overseas Lines (1947–50); Pacific Union Marine Corp. (1950–55); Pacific Bulk Carrier Inc. (1955–59)
- Builder: Sun Shipbuilding Co. (Chester, PA)
- Launched: 23 March 1918
- Sponsored by: Mrs T. A. Sparks
- Completed: May 1918
- Acquired: (USN): 11 April 1918
- Commissioned: 13 May 1918 – 24 Oct 1919
- In service: 13 May 1918 – 1959?
- Renamed: War Indian (yard name); Radnor (christened name); USS Radnor (ID-3023) (1918); Jacob Luckenbach (1930); Tung Ping (1947); Pacific Dragon (1950); Oceanic Justice (1955)
- Identification: ID-3023
- Fate: Scrapped at Tokyo, Japan, 1959

General characteristics
- Type: Cargo ship (Apr 1918 – Apr 1919); (Oct 1919 – 1959)
- Tonnage: 7470 GRT
- Length: 450 ft (137.2 m); 435 ft (132.6 m) bp
- Beam: 57 ft 6 in (17.5 m)
- Draft: 28 ft 2 in (8.6 m)
- Depth of hold: 38 ft 6 in (11.7 m)
- Decks: 3
- Installed power: 1 × 3-cyl. triple expansion; 2,600 ihp
- Propulsion: Single screw
- Speed: 10.5 knots (12.1 mph; 19.4 km/h)
- Range: 12,524 miles (20,155 km) – coal; 14,300 miles (23,000 km) – oil
- Complement: (USN): 75
- Crew: (Merchant): 40–44
- Armament: (WWI): 1 × 5 in (13 cm) gun aft; 1 × 4 in (10 cm) gun forward

General characteristics
- Type: Troop transport (13 May—24 Oct 1919)
- Capacity: 37 officers, 1,900 enlisted
- Complement: 21 officers, 168 enlisted
- Notes: Other characteristics similar to cargo ship above

USS Radnor (ID-3023) was a cargo ship and later troop transport that served with the United States Navy in 1918–19, during and shortly after World War I. The ship later went into merchant service, and in 1948 under Chinese ownership reportedly became the first all-Chinese ship to visit South America. Radnor was originally ordered as SS War Indian by a private company, but with U.S. entry into World War I in April 1917, she was requisitioned by the U.S. Navy for use as a cargo ship. Commissioned as USS Radnor (ID-3023) in May 1918, the ship spent the remainder of the war transporting cargoes for the Navy. After the war, USS Radnor was converted into a troop transport and used to repatriate U.S. troops home from France.

Following decommission, the ship entered mercantile service as the cargo ship SS Radnor, operating under charter from the United States Shipping Board with a succession of private companies, mostly in trade between the United States and the Far East. In 1930, Radnor was sold to the Luckenbach Steamship Company, renamed SS Jacob Luckenbach, and employed in intercoastal service between the East and West coasts of the United States.

After America's entry into World War II, Jacob Luckenbach made some long independent voyages to Australia, the Middle East and Far Eastern destinations, before joining the Atlantic convoy system in July 1943. For the next year, the ship made four round trips in convoy across the Atlantic, carrying vital supplies from the United States to Great Britain. In the closing stages of the war, the ship returned to independent service, operating between the United States and South America.

In 1947, Jacob Luckenbach was sold to C. Y. Tung's fledgling Chinese Maritime Trust and renamed SS Tung Ping. In 1948, Tung Ping reportedly became the first all-Chinese ship to visit Central and South America. In 1950, the ship was sold to Panamanian interests, and operated under the names SS Pacific Dragon and later, SS Oceanic Justice. Oceanic Justice was scrapped in Tokyo, Japan in 1959.

This ship is not to be confused with the SS Jacob Luckenbach which was a Type C3-class ship built in 1944 and which sank after a collision off San Francisco in 1953.

== Construction and design ==
Radnor— a steel-hulled, single-screw cargo ship originally named War Indian—was ordered from the Sun Shipbuilding Company of Chester, Pennsylvania by the Cunard Steamship Company. With the entry of the United States into World War I in July 1917, all ships then under construction in the United States, including War Indian, were requisitioned for the war effort by the United States Shipping Board (USSB). War Indian, renamed SS Radnor by the USSB, was launched 23 March 1918, sponsored by Mrs John J. Sparks, with "many army and navy officers" in attendance, while a crowd of thousands was reportedly denied access to the shipyard for security reasons. Radnor was completed in May 1918.

Radnor had a length of 450 feet (137.2 m)—435 feet (132.6 m) between perpendiculars)—beam of 57 feet 6 inches (17.5 m), draft of 28 feet 2 inches (8.6 m) and hold depth of 38 feet 6 inches (11.7 m). The ship had a gross register tonnage of 7,470, and deadweight tonnage of 10,000 long tons. Radnor had three steel decks; four large cargo holds; seven watertight bulkheads; and a double bottom divided into compartments, some of which were designed for holding oil fuel and others water ballast. For handling cargoes, Radnor was fitted with two hinged kingposts, one fore and one aft, each of which mounted four 5-ton booms, plus two additional 5-ton booms amidships and a large, 30-ton boom aft. Additional equipment included 10 steam winches, a steam capstan and steam-powered steering gear. The ship had a single smokestack, and a telescopic mast for wireless transmission placed amidships. For protection against submarines, Radnor was fitted with a four-inch gun forward and a five-inch gun aft, while "extra" lifesaving equipment included 26 lifeboats, two rafts and a "working boat". Accommodation for the ship's complement of 75 included officers' quarters in a deckhouse amidships, engineers' quarters in side deckhouses, and crew quarters in the forecastle.

Radnor was powered by a 2,600 ihp three-cylinder triple expansion steam engine with cylinders of 27, 45 1/2 and 76 inches by 51 inches stroke (68.6, 115.6 and 193 by 129.5 cm), driving a single screw propeller and delivering the ship a design speed of 10.5 knots. Steam was supplied by three single-ended Scotch boilers with a working pressure of 190 pounds. Both engine and boilers were manufactured by the shipbuilder. Radnor was capable of running on either coal or oil fuel, and had bunker space for 2,089 tons of coal and 1,812 tons of oil. When running on coal, the ship had a range of 12,524 miles on consumption of 52 tons per day, and on oil, a range of 14,300 miles on consumption of 32 tons per day.

== Service history ==
=== U.S. Navy service, May 1918 – September 1919 ===
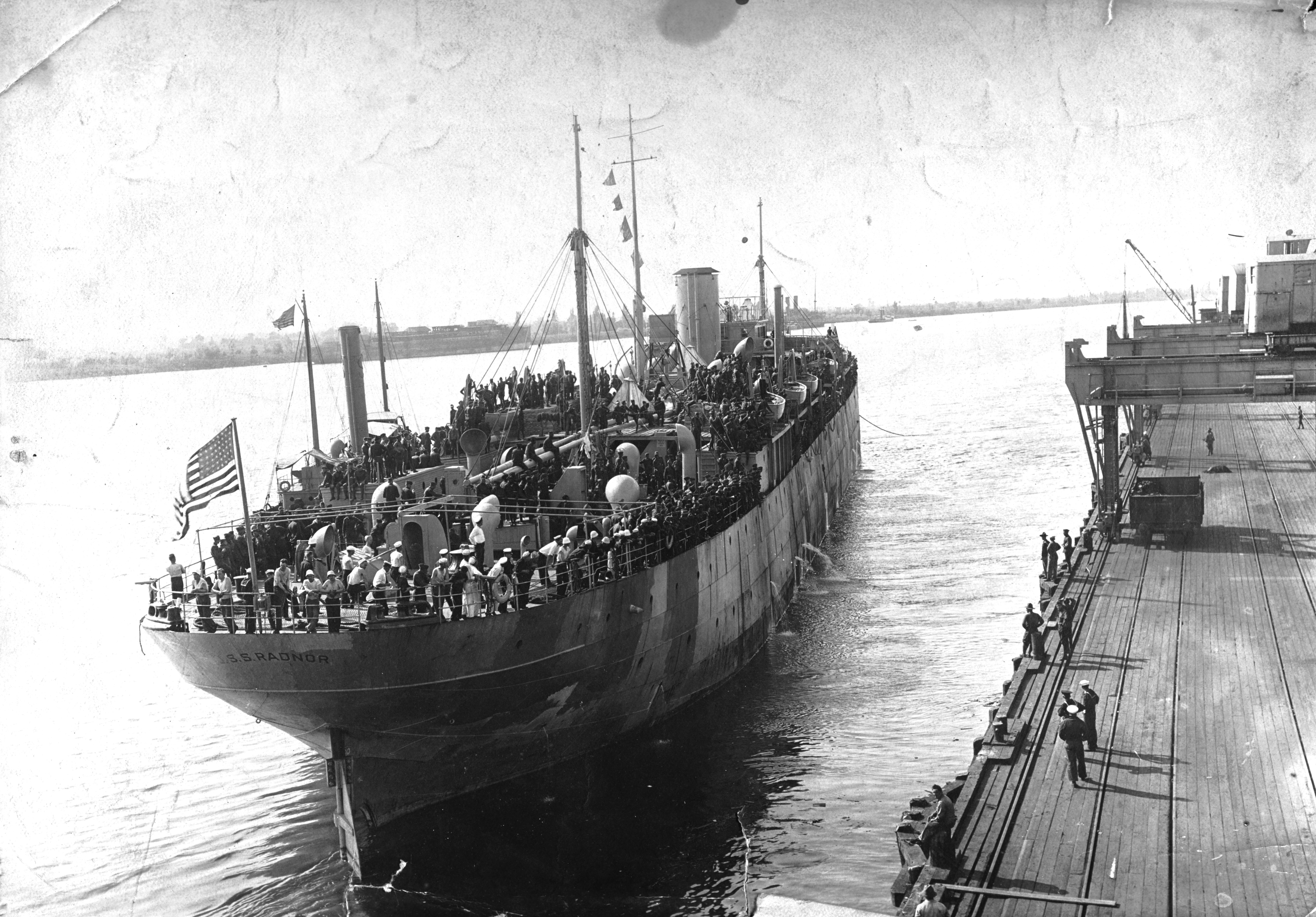
USS Radnor departing with troops aboard, 1919, probably from American Bassens, France

Radnor was acquired by the U.S. Navy on 11 April 1918 and commissioned at Philadelphia on 13 May. Assigned to the Naval Overseas Transportation Service, Radnor was utilized by the Navy as a cargo ship for the remainder of the war.

Radnor's service began 31 May 1918 when the ship departed Philadelphia "with a full army cargo" bound for Cristóbal, Canal Zone, before proceeding via Callao, Peru, to Antofagasta, Chile, arriving 28 June. Later, Radnor joined two convoys to France, the first arriving at Marseille 19 September and the second reaching Quiberon 4 January 1919.

With the war over, the foreign contingent of the American Cruiser and Transport Force withdrew, leaving the U.S. government short of the transport capacity needed to quickly repatriate the hundreds of thousands of U.S. troops stationed in France. Radnor consequently became one of 56 ships selected for conversion to troop transports, and was transferred to the Cruiser and Transport Force on 7 March. Radnor was converted to a troop transport by W. & A. Fletcher Co. at Hoboken, New Jersey, between 22 March and 22 April 1919, at a cost of $122,488, after which she had a troop-carrying capacity of 37 officers and 1,900 enlisted men, and a crew complement of 21 officers and 168 enlisted men.

Radnor made four round trips to France, repatriating a total of 5,876 troops including fifteen sick or wounded, the last of these voyages ending 23 September. With this final naval assignment complete, Radnor was detached from the Cruiser and Transport Force on 24 or 25 September, and returned to control of the United States Shipping Board 24 October.

=== Merchant service, interwar period ===
After decommissioning from the Navy, Radnor operated for a succession of private companies, under charter from the USSB, as the cargo ship SS Radnor. The first company to charter the vessel appears to have been Sigsbee, Humphrey & Co., which contracted with the USSB in late 1919 or early 1920. Radnor is known to have made at least one voyage for this company, from Danzig, Germany, to New York in April 1921, but by late 1921 the company's contract with the USSB had been terminated. After this, Radnor spent the next seven or eight years operating as a cargo ship between a variety of ports in the United States, including New York, New Orleans and San Pedro, California, and various destinations in the Pacific and Far East including Honolulu, Hawaii; Cebu and Manila, Philippines; Singapore; Hong Kong; and Shanghai, China.

In October 1922, Radnor transported the "unusually heavy" cargo of 10,500 tons of coal from Immingham, England, to Camden, Delaware, reportedly resulting in the ship's deck being "two feet under water for two days in stormy weather" during the voyage. Just prior to this trip, Radnor had employed an American youth in the East Indies who became deranged and attempted to attack the ship's captain, L. C. Howard. Placed in irons, the youth managed to escape before being handed over to the American consulate in London.

On 31 March 1925, Radnor was grounded off Beagle Island, Philippines while en route to Europe with a cargo of hemp. The ship was successfully refloated, but found to be leaking from a tank and was forced to return to Hong Kong for repairs. In June, the vessel arrived at New York via Philadelphia while under charter to American Pioneer Lines, with a scheduled return to the Far East via San Pedro.

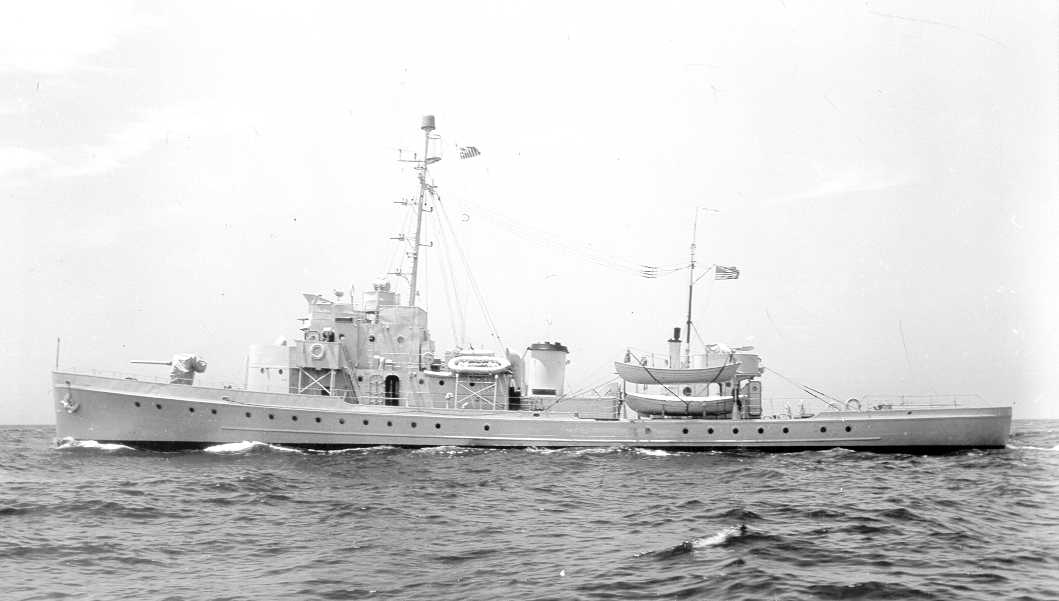
USCGC Perseus (WPC-114) was sent to Jacob Luckenbach's aid after the freighter broke a propeller shaft off San Pedro, CA, in November 1936

By 1926, Radnor had been chartered to the Barber Steamship Line. On 24 August, shortly after arriving at Brooklyn, a thorough search of the ship conducted by customs officials revealed contraband items including nine Chinese rugs worth $10,000 and 48 bottles of whisky and cordials worth an estimated $500. After Radnor's officers and crew denied all knowledge of the contraband goods, the shipping line was fined $5 per whisky bottle and warned that the ship was subject to libel over the rugs.

Jacob Luckenbach

On 23 January 1930, Radnor was sold by the USSB to the Luckenbach Steamship Company for the sum of $201,000. Renamed SS Jacob Luckenbach, the ship along with two others was used to expand the Luckenbach Line's intercoastal service from five ships to eight, enabling the Line to increase its schedule from one voyage every sixteen days to one in ten. The ships in this service carried miscellaneous cargoes, including steel, sugar and lumber. Homeported at New Orleans, Jacob Luckenbach was to remain in this service for about a decade, operating between various ports on the East and West coasts of the United States, via the Panama Canal, until the nation's entry into World War II in December 1941.

Jacob Luckenbach suffered a number of accidents while in intercoastal service. The first occurred on 5 November 1936, when the ship broke her propeller shaft 130 miles from San Pedro en route from the Gulf of Mexico. The Coast Guard cutter USCGC Perseus (WPC-114) was despatched to her aid, along with a tug sent to tow the vessel to San Pedro. On 4 August 1937, a fire broke out in one of Jacob Luckenbach's holds while the ship was berthed at Grove Street, Oakland. Firefighters wearing gas masks were able to extinguish the flames after about two hours, with damage to the ship and cargo estimated at $2000. The most serious accident to Jacob Luckenbach occurred on 1 March 1940, when the ship ran aground at the entrance of the southwest pass of the Mississippi River while en route to Los Angeles. Two Coast Guard cutters and a third vessel were despatched to stand by the stricken vessel. She was eventually refloated a week later on 8 March with the assistance of tugboats, after which she was anchored at the site pending inspection.

=== World War II ===
Jacob Luckenbach remained active throughout World War II, initially ranging far and wide as an independent cargo carrier following America's entry into the war, and from June 1943 to June 1944, participating in several convoys delivering vital supplies from the United States to Great Britain. After June 1944, the vessel returned to mostly independent voyages, operating between the United States and various Central and South American destinations.

Shortly after America's entry into the war on 7 December 1941, Jacob Luckenbach departed New Orleans 21 December bound for Australasia via the Panama Canal, Los Angeles and San Francisco. Departing San Francisco 19 February 1942, the ship arrived at Wellington, New Zealand on 18 March, before continuing on to Sydney and Brisbane, Australia, arriving 4 and 12 April respectively, before returning to Sydney on the 14th. On the 23rd, Jacob Luckenbach departed Sydney for Mobile, Alabama via the Panama Canal, arriving 1 June. From here, the ship visited Havana, Cuba, before returning to New York via Key West, Florida and Hampton Roads, Virginia, arriving 1 July.

Jacob Luckenbach departed New York on her second major voyage of the war on 27 September 1942, first visiting Guantanamo, Cuba before proceeding to Cape Town, South Africa via the Panama Canal, arriving 12 November. From there, the ship continued on to Khorramshahr and Abadan, Iran, then to Bahrain before returning to Bandar Abbas, Iran, arriving at the latter 18 February 1943. From Bandar Abbas, the ship visited several ports in India and Sri Lanka including Mumbai, Colombo, Visakhapatnam and Kolkata before steaming to Fremantle, Australia, arriving 10 April. Departing Fremantle on the 13th, Jacob Luckenbach made for the United States via the Panama Canal, returning to New York via Key West on 9 June.

Jacob Luckenbach departed on her first voyage in convoy to the United Kingdom, carrying general supplies, with convoy HX250 from New York on 30 July. Arriving at Loch Ewe, Scotland, 12 August, the ship continued on to Methil and Immingham before returning to Loch Ewe via Methil to join convoy ON201 returning to New York, arriving 24 September. The ship's second wartime voyage to the U.K., this time carrying general supplies and explosives, was made with convoy HX262, which departed New York 18 October, arriving at Loch Ewe 2 November, after which Jacob Luckenbach continued on to Swansea and Milford Haven, England, before returning to New York 14 December with convoy ON213. From there, the ship moved North to Halifax, Nova Scotia via Boston, Massachusetts, where, with a cargo of general supplies and explosives, she departed 30 January 1944 with convoy HX277 to Newport, Wales, arriving 26 February. The vessel then continued on independently to Milford Haven, where she joined convoy ON226 for the return trip to Boston, arriving 14 March. Jacob Luckenbach's final wartime voyage to the UK, with a cargo of general supplies and barges, was made with convoy HX286, which departed New York 5 April and arrived at Cardiff, Scotland, 21 April. Departing Cardiff 3 May, the steamer made for Belfast Lough, where she joined convoy ON236 for the voyage back to New York, arriving 27 May 1944.

For the remainder of the war, Jacob Luckenbach returned once more to mostly independent operation, making several round trips between New York and San Juan, Puerto Rico, as well as other Central and South American ports including Mayaguez, Puerto Rico; Guantanamo, Santiago and Jucaro in Cuba; Curacao; and Puerto Cabello and Puerto La Cruz, Venezuela.

Shortly after the end of hostilities, Jacob Luckenbach departed New York 15 November 1945, arriving Terneuzen, Netherlands, 29 November. In a reprise of her role after World War I, the ship then made a minor contribution to Operation Magic Carpet, repatriating 31 soldiers from Antwerp, Belgium, to New York, where she arrived 4 January 1946.

=== First Chinese ship to South America, 1948 ===
In 1947, Jacob Luckenbach was sold to C. Y. Tung's fledgling Chinese Maritime Trust, which would later become one of the largest shipping lines in the world. (Note: Note that some sources state the vessel was sold to a company called China Overseas Lines—this was apparently either a subsidiary of or an alternative name for the Chinese Maritime Trust.) After the sale, the ship was renamed SS Tung Ping.

In 1948, Tung Ping reportedly became the first Chinese-owned, Chinese-flagged, Chinese-crewed ship to visit Central and South America. Later that year, she reportedly became the first such ship to visit New Orleans.

=== Later history ===
In 1950, Tung Ping was sold to Pacific Union Marine Corp. of Panama and renamed SS Pacific Dragon. In 1955, Pacific Dragon was sold to Pacific Bulk Carrier Inc. of Panama and renamed SS Oceanic Justice.

Oceanic Justice was scrapped at Tokyo, Japan, on 12 July 1959.
