= USS George Washington =

Four ships of the United States Navy have been named USS George Washington in honor of George Washington.

- USS George Washington (1798), was purchased on 12 October 1798 and served for less than four years. She was sold in May 1802.
- USS George Washington (ID-3018), was a German ocean liner, launched in 1908. She was taken over and converted into a transport by the US Navy during World War I. She was sold for scrap in 1951.
- USS George Washington (SSBN-598), the lead ship of her class, was the first American ballistic missile submarine. She was commissioned 30 December 1959 and decommissioned 24 January 1985.
- USS George Washington (CVN-73), is the sixth Nimitz-class aircraft carrier. She was commissioned on 4 July 1992 and is currently in active service.

== See also ==
- USS Washington
- USS George Washington Carver
- SS George Washington
