= Edgar F. Luckenbach =

American shipping magnate (1868–1943)

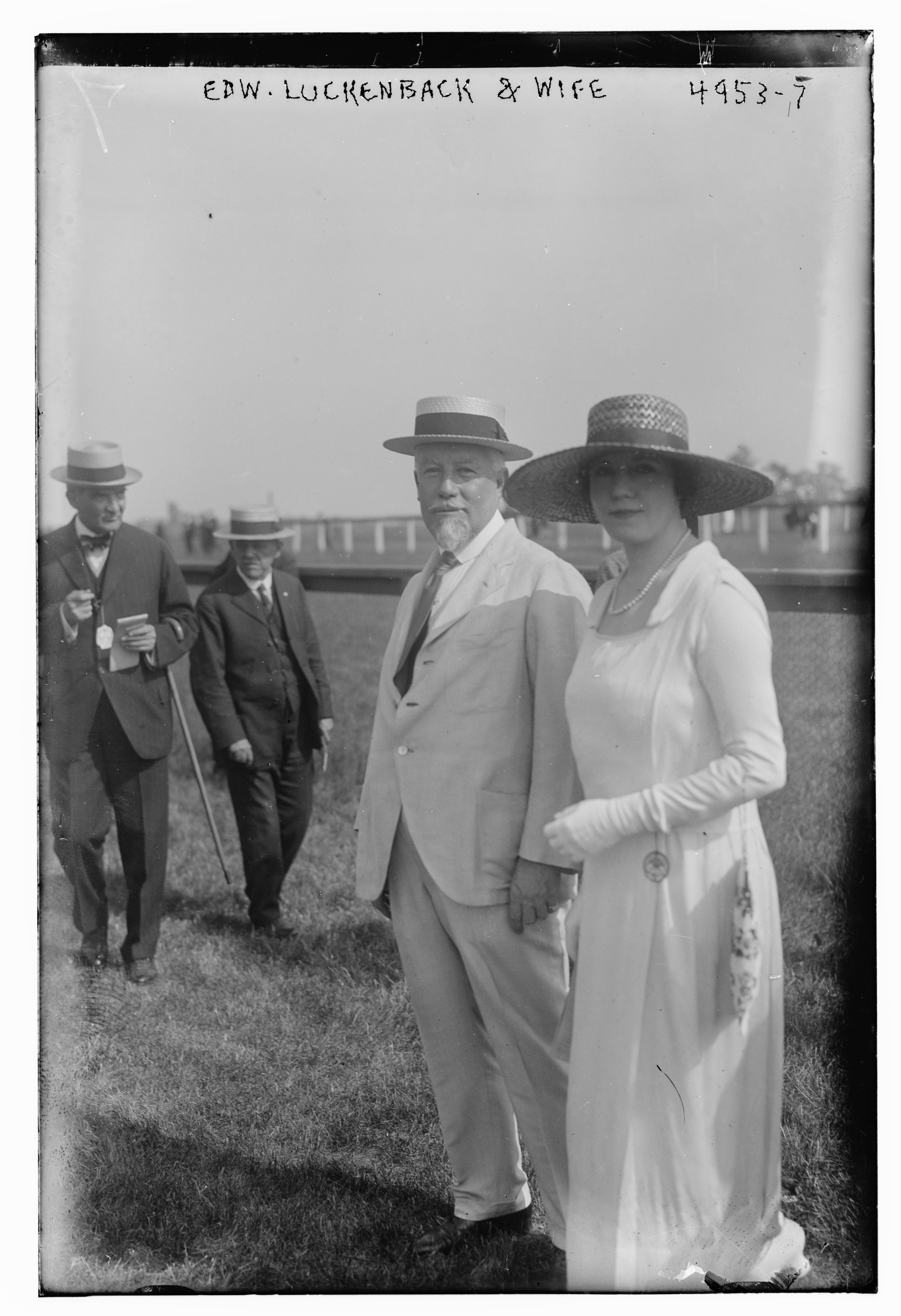
- Edgar F. Luckenbach and his wife
- Born: Edgar Frederick Luckenbach; January 19, 1868; New York City
- Died: April 26, 1943 (aged 75); Sands Point, New York
- Occupation: President
- Employer: Luckenbach Steamship Company
- Spouses: Florence Bissell; Susan G. Vickers; Andrea Fenwick (m. 1919–1937)
- Children: 3
- Father: Lewis Luckenbach

Edgar Frederick Luckenbach, Sr. (January 19, 1868 – April 26, 1943) was an American shipping magnate who inherited his father's steamship company, which he incorporated in 1913 under the name Luckenbach Steamship Company, Inc. (also known as Luckenbach Lines). He was also the President of Luckenbach Terminal Company. At his death in 1943, his estate amounted to more than 60 million dollars, or around 700 million dollars in 2022 money.

== Family ==
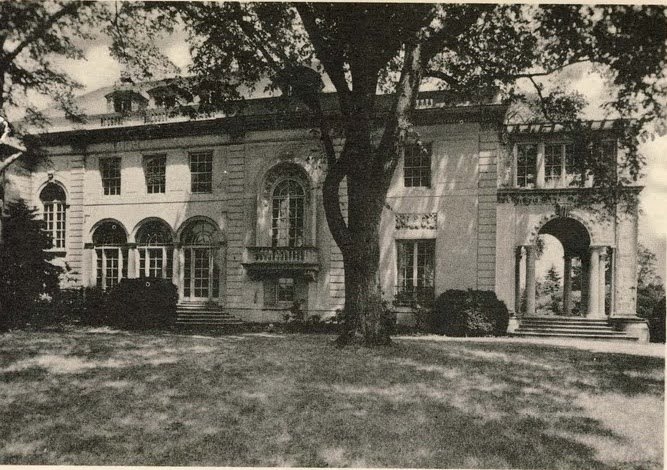
Elm Court, Sands Point, New York. Gilded age mansion of shipping magnate Edgar Luckenbach

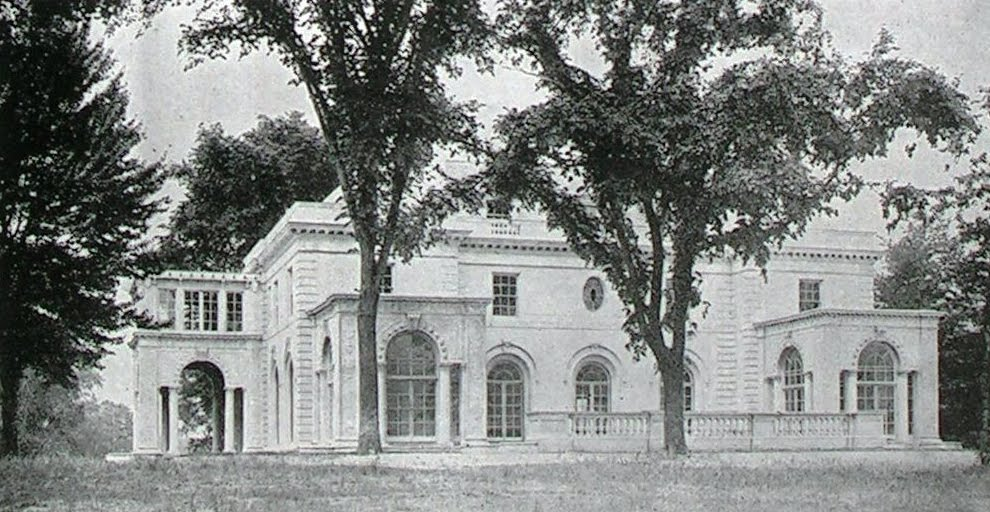
Elm Court, built in 1921 and designed by Egerton Swartwout

Edgar Luckenbach was born in Kingston, New York. His parents, both born in Germany, were Lewis (Ludwig) Luckenbach (died August 18, 1906) and Mary E. Frey (died January 24, 1926). His family then moved to Brooklyn, where Edgar attended public schools. After graduating from high school, Edgar went to Rondout, New York, to join his father in the shipping business, which had been founded in 1850.

Edgar Luckenbach married three times. His first marriage was to Florence Bissell, of Brooklyn, niece of Dr. Leroy Milton Yale Jr. of the Yale family. However, she died a few months after their marriage. His next marriage was to Susan Vickers, which terminated in divorce. Finally, he married Andrea Fenwick in 1919, and they remained married until her death at age 50 in 1937. The family lived at Elm Court, their estate in Sands Point, New York, and usually wintered in Palm Beach, Florida.

Luckenbach had one son with his second wife, named Lewis V Luckenbach . His second son, Lewis V Luckenbach had one son named Lewis Luckenbach Jr. Lewis Luckenbach Jr. had only one child named Lewis Luckenbach III. Lewis Luckenbach III had three children named Katrina, Laura and Niles Lewis Luckenbach. As of 2025 Lewis Luckenbach III has seven grandchildren. Edgar had two children with his third wife, named Edgar Frederick Luckenbach, Jr. (May 17, 1925 - August 9, 1974) and Andrea (June 12,1920 d. April 1, 1962) at the age of 41). His second son, Edgar Frederick Luckenbach Jr. had two sons, Edgar Frederick Luckenbach III and Jason A. Luckenbach. Andrea Luckenbach had no children. In his later life, Luckenbach had a tumultuous relationship with his daughter. After her marriage to William Dobbs in 1939, a man of whom he did not approve, Luckenbach refused to give her any money for support. Andrea was then forced to withdraw early from her trust fund, which had been set up by her grandmother. When just 33 years old, Andrea was shot four times by her estranged 3rd husband Frederick O. Hammer in June 1954 in the paddock of the Delaware Park race course, but survived.

== Personal interests ==
Luckenbach was very active in club affairs. He was a member of the Atlantic Yacht Club, Sands Point Bath Club, New York Yacht Club, the Turf and Field Club, the United Hunts Club and the Everglades Club of Palm Beach.

In business, he was a member of the Maritime Association of the Port of New York, the Commerce and Industry Association of New York and the New York Produce Exchange. He was elected president of the American Steamship Owners Association in 1927, but refused the post because of his busy business.

He was also an avid horseman. His saddle mare, Lucky Nira, won many horse shows throughout the 1920s and 1930s. His third wife, Andrea, also held many horse shows at their country estate.

== Death ==
After months of declining health, Edgar F. Luckenbach died at his estate, Elm Court, in Sands Point, New York, on April 26, 1943. He was 75 years old.

His son Lieutenant Edgar F. Luckenbach Jr. inherited more than 6 million dollars from his father, or around 80 million dollars in 2022 money. He married Audrey Jean Yost Clifton of New York, daughter of Commander Charles Yost, U.S. Ambassador of the United Nations, appointed by President Richard Nixon.

During Edgar Luckenbach Jr. tenure as the head of the shipping empire of his father, he reorganized the company by withdrawing ships from the unprofitable intercoastal trade, and re-deployed them on the international charter market. He and its affiliates served over 150 ship-owning principals and their vessels on the Atlantic and Gulf coasts. He became the National Director of the Navy League of the United States, Commanding Officer Staff of the Naval Intelligence Reserve, and served as Assistant U.S. Naval Attaché in Singapore. He also moved the headquarters to 120 Wall Street, Manhattan.

A few years after his death, the 104 acres (0.42 km^{2}) Elm Court estate was put up for auction. It consisted of a 22-room main house, a 12-room dwelling, a 4-room cottage, a 7-room house and two 8-room homes. Also on the estate were a six-car and a four-car garage, greenhouses, orchards, a chicken coop and a bathhouse on the beach.

The estate later became the campus of Sands Point Country Day School, also known as Sands Point Academy, a school for gifted children, which operated there from 1954 to 1973.

== Business ==
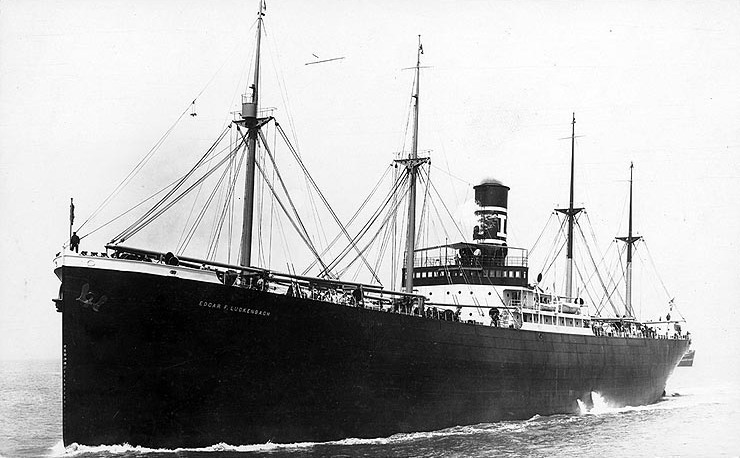
USS Edgar F. Luckenbach (ID-4597)

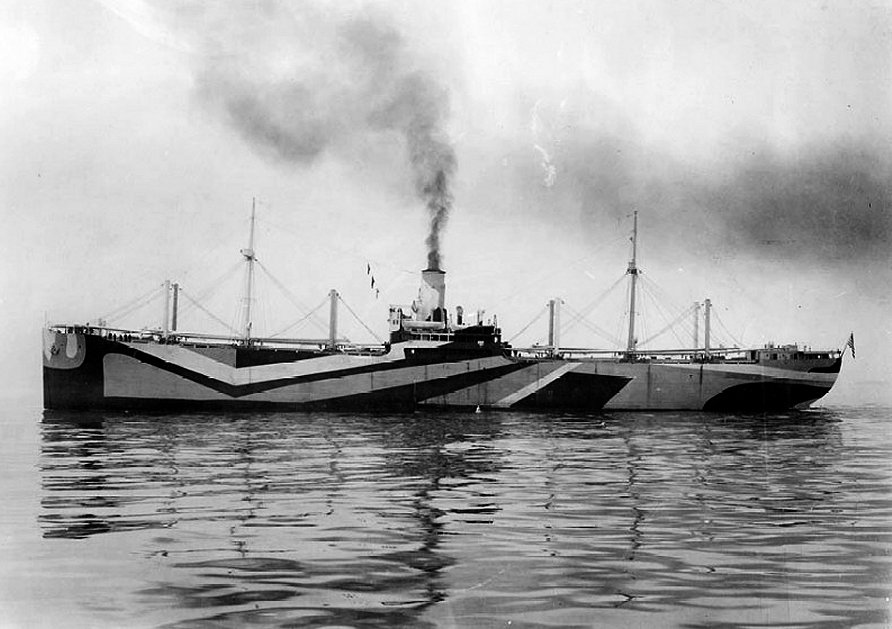
USS Katrina Luckenbach (ID-3020)

Luckenbach's father Lewis owned the Luckenbach Steamship Company, and Edgar succeeded to its presidency upon Lewis's death in 1906, moving its operations to Manhattan.

After the First World War, Luckenbach decided it was in the best interest of the company to focus on domestic trade. He established terminal facilities throughout the United States, including in Brooklyn, Philadelphia, Mobile and Galveston. Luckenbach Steamship Company was a successful and longest-lived US shipping companies. Lewis Luckenbach started in 1850 with one tugboat in New York. Next, he started moving barge transport of Virginia coal in barges with tugs from Norfolk, Virginia to New England. During World War II Luckenbach Steamship Company chartered ships from the Maritime Commission and War Shipping Administration.

During wartime, the Luckenbach Steamship Company operated Victory ships, Liberty ships, and a few Empire ships. After the war, the company purchased some of the low-cost post-war cargo ships. Luckenbach Steamship Company failed to upgrade to container ships and modernize as other shipping lines did in the 1970s and with the Vietnam War over Luckenbach Steamship Company closed in 1974, all ships being sold or scrapped due to age.

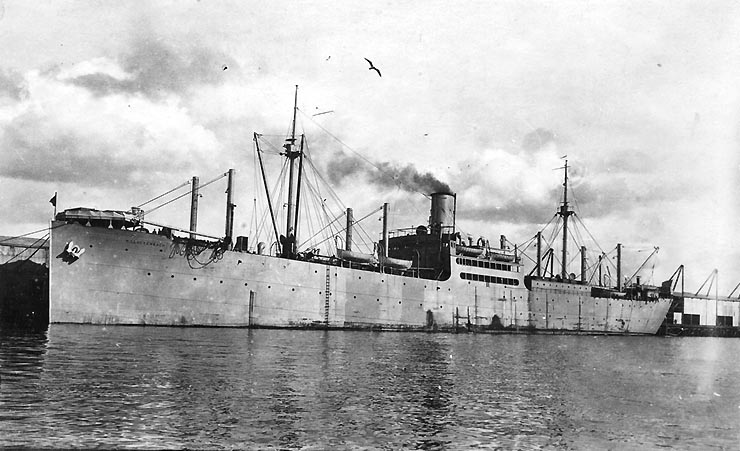
USS K. I. Luckenbach (ID-2291)

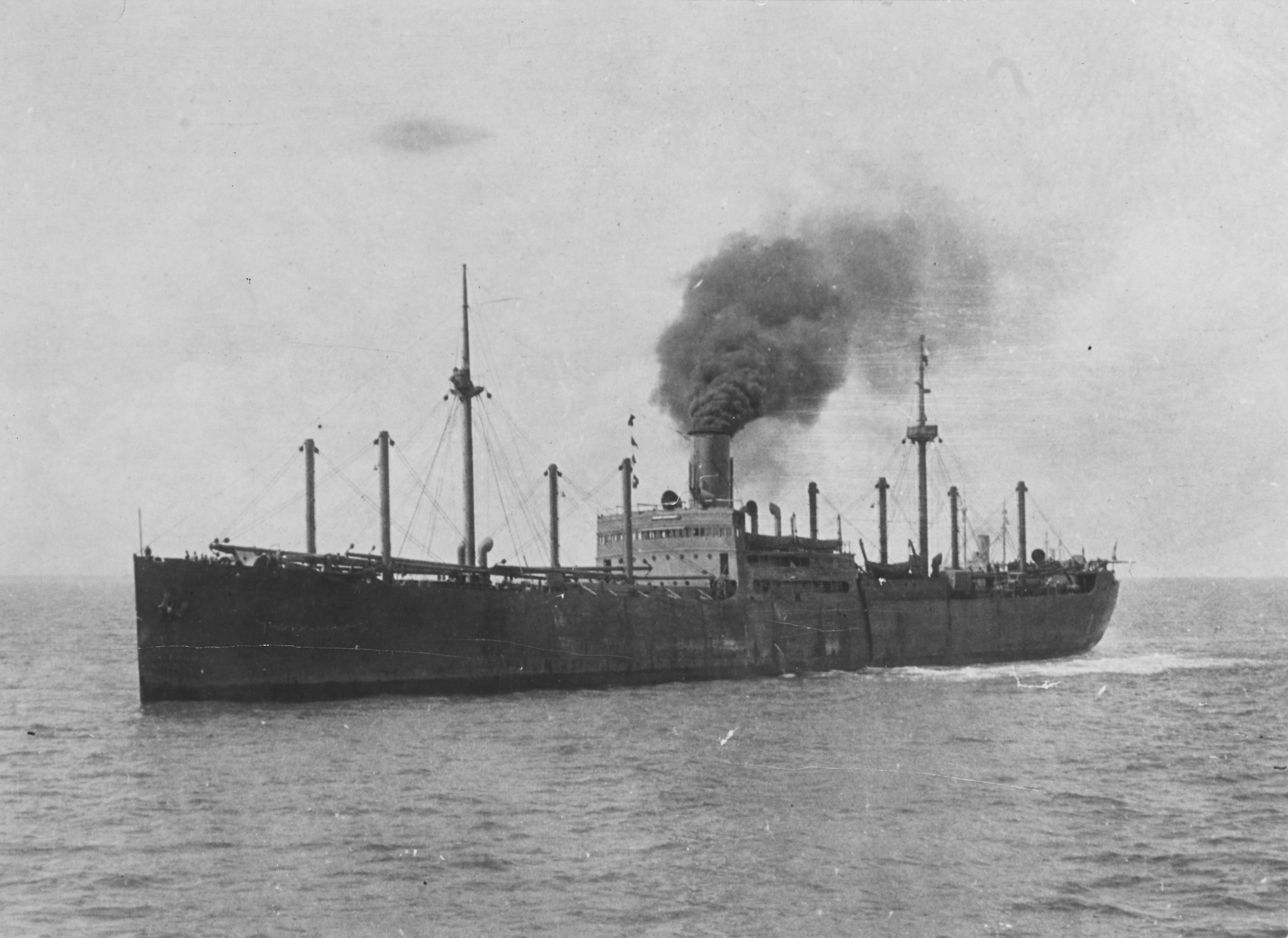
USS F. J. Luckenbach (ID-2160)

- Some ships: SS Harry Luckenbach, SS War Indian, SS Lena Luckenbach, USS Walter A. Luckenbach (ID-3171), USS Katrina Luckenbach, SS Jacob Luckenbach, USS Seneca, USS Montauk (SP-1213), USS Penobscot (SP-982), USS W. F. Babcock, Washington (SP-1241), SS Saale, SS Booker T. Washington, USS Edgar F. Luckenbach (ID-4597), USS Edward Luckenbach, USS F. J. Luckenbach (ID-2160), USS Frederick Luckenbach (1888), USS Julia Luckenbach (ID-2407), USS K. I. Luckenbach (ID-2291), USS Katrina Luckenbach (ID-3020), USS Luckenbach Tug No. 1 (ID-1232), and USS Walter A. Luckenbach (ID-3171).

A second SS Jacob Luckenbach sank on 14 July 1953 after a collision off San Francisco in fog while carrying military supplies to Korea. The wreck was determined in 2002 to be a source of oil pollution and about 85,000 gallons of oil were removed.

World War 2 charter the:

- SS Red Oak Victory
- SS Navajo Victory
- SS Kokomo Victory
- SS F. A. C. Muhlenberg
- SS Frederick Douglass
- SS Kemp P. Battle
- SS Haym Salomon
- SS Howard T. Ricketts
- SS Pine Bluff Victory
- SS Pittston Victory
- SS John S. Casement
- SS Stephen H. Long
- SS Stephen Hopkins
- SS Edward W. Bok
- SS Edwin L. Godkin
- SS Mexico Victory
- SS Billy Sunday
- SS John R. Park
- SS David Bushnell
- SS Donald H. Holland
- Selma Victory
  - Lost in the war:
- Edward Luckenbach, July 2, 1942, struck a mine
- Forence Luckenbach, Jan. 29, 1942 torpedoed
- Matthew Luckenbach, March 19, 1943, torpedoed
- Lena Luckenbach, Aug. 4, 1944 blew up at Port Chicago disaster
- Stephen Hopkins, Sept. 27, 1942 shelled & sank
- John R. Parks, March 21, 1945, torpedoed

== See also ==
- Luckenbach Steamship Co. v. United States
