= SS Mexico Victory =

Victory ship of the United States

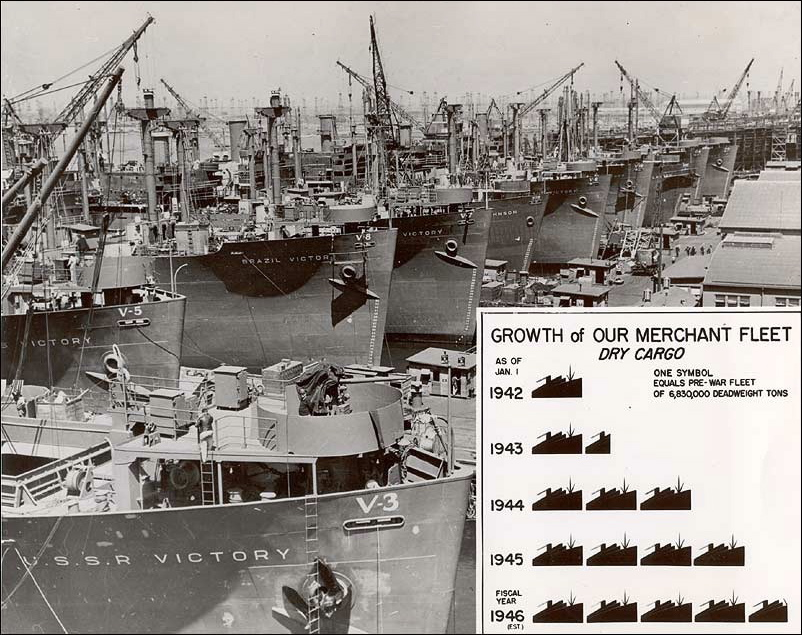
- The fourth ship, with V-7 on the hull, is the SS Mexico Victory.

History

United States
- Name: SS Mexico Victory
- Namesake: Mexico
- Owner: War Shipping Administration
- Operator: Luckenbach Line
- Builder: California Shipbuilding Company, Los Angeles
- Laid down: January 26, 1944
- Launched: March 27, 1944
- Completed: May 19, 1944
- Fate: Sold, 1947

Poland
- Name: SS Kilinski
- Namesake: Jan Kiliński
- Owner: Gdynia-America Shipping Lines, Gdańsk.
- Fate: Sold, 1973

Denmark
- Name: SS Lin
- Owner: Poul Christensen of Denmark.
- Operator: Universal Mariners S.A
- Fate: Scrapped in Taiwan, 1973

General characteristics
- Class & type: VC2-S-AP3 Victory ship
- Tonnage: 7612 GRT, 4,553 NRT
- Displacement: 15,200 tons
- Length: 455 ft (139 m)
- Beam: 62 ft (19 m)
- Draught: 28 ft (8.5 m)
- Installed power: 8,500 shp (6,300 kW)
- Propulsion: HP & LP turbines geared to a single 20.5-foot (6.2 m) propeller, by Westinghouse Electric & Mfg. Co., Essington
- Speed: 16.5 knots
- Boats & landing craft carried: 4 Lifeboats
- Complement: 62 Merchant Marine and 28 US Naval Armed Guards
- Armament: 1 × 5 inch (127 mm)/38 caliber gun as Victory ship; 1 × 3 inch (76 mm)/50 caliber gun; 8 × 20 mm Oerlikon

The SS Mexico Victory was the 7th Victory ship built during World War II. She was launched by the California Shipbuilding Company on March 27, 1944, and completed on May 19, 1944. She was built in 114 days under the Emergency Shipbuilding program. The ship’s United States Maritime Commission designation was VC2-S-AP3, hull number 7 (V-7). SS Mexico Victory served in the Pacific Ocean during World War II. The 10,500-ton Victory ships were designed to replace the earlier Liberty Ships. Liberty ships were designed to be used just for World War II. Victory ships were designed to last longer and serve the US Navy after the war. The Victory ship differed from a Liberty ship in that they were: faster, longer and wider, taller, a thinner stack set farther toward the superstructure and had a long raised forecastle. SS Mexico Victory was the 7th of a long line of Victory ships to leave the Calship building. The launching of the SS Mexico Victory splashed into the water of Wilmington, Los Angeles.

== World War II ==
SS Mexico Victory served in the Atlantic Ocean in World War II as a troopship. She served as a troop ship to take troops to Europe. SS Mexico Victory and 96 other Victory ships were converted to troop ships to bring the US soldiers home as part of Operation Magic Carpet. She departed February 27, 1945 from New York Port of Embarkation and arrived March 11, 1945 at Liverpool, England. On January 3, 1946 she arrived at Newport News, Virginia, with 1,514 troops. On December 6, 1945, she arrived in New York to bring troops home.

She was laid up for a short time in 1947 in the National Defense Reserve Fleet at Suisun Bay, till she was put back in service for the Korean War.

== Korean War ==
The Mexico Victory served in the Korean War from 1950 until 1953 helping American forces engaged against Communist aggression in South Korea. About 75 percent of the personnel taken to Korea for the Korean War came by the merchant marine ships. SS Mexico Victory transported goods, mail, food and other supplies. About 90 percent of the cargo was moved by merchant marine ships to the war zone.

== Post war ==
In 1967 she was sold to Gdynia-America Shipping Lines in Gdańsk, Poland, and renamed SS Kilinski. In 1971 she was sold to Poul Christensen in Denmark and renamed SS Lin. In 1973 she was scrapped in Kaohsiung, Taiwan.

== See also ==
- List of Victory ships
- Liberty ship
- Type C1 ship
- Type C2 ship
- Type C3 ship

Typical Victory Ship

== Sources ==
- Sawyer, L.A. and W.H. Mitchell. Victory ships and tankers: The history of the ‘Victory’ type cargo ships and of the tankers built in the United States of America during World War II, Cornell Maritime Press, 1974, 0-87033-182-5.
- United States Maritime Commission:
- Victory Cargo Ships
