= USS Montauk (SP-1213) =

Tugboat of the United States Navy

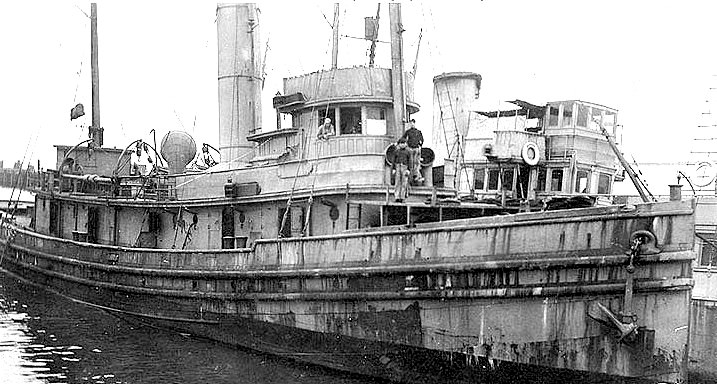
- USS Montauk (SP-1213) photographed during the World War I era.

History

United States
- Name: USS Montauk
- Namesake: A village and fishing resort on Long Island, New York, near Montauk Point, the eastern extremity of New York.
- Owner: Luckenbach Steamship Company
- Builder: Neafie & Levy, Philadelphia, Pennsylvania
- Laid down: date unknown
- Christened: as Luckenbach No. 3
- Completed: 1899
- Acquired: by the Navy 12 October 1917
- Commissioned: 6 December 1917
- Decommissioned: December 1919
- Stricken: c. December 1919
- Homeport: New York City
- Fate: Sold 21 May 1920 to the Bisso Towing Company

General characteristics
- Type: Tugboat
- Displacement: 424 tons
- Length: 134 ft 6 in (41.00 m)
- Beam: 26 ft (7.9 m)
- Draft: 16 ft (4.9 m)
- Propulsion: steam engine
- Speed: 11.5 knots
- Complement: 40 officers and enlisted
- Armament: One 3-inch gun; Two machine guns

USS Montauk (SP-1213) was a tugboat purchased by the U.S. Navy during World War I. She was assigned to towing duties in New York City waterways. Post-war she was decommissioned and sold.

== History ==
The third ship to be so named by the U.S. Navy, Montauk (SP 1213), ex-Luckenbach No. 3, was built in 1899 by Neafie & Levy of Philadelphia, Pennsylvania; purchased by the Navy from the Luckenbach Steamship Company, 12 October 1917; and commissioned 6 December 1917.

Assigned to the 3d Naval District, the 434 gross ton tug operated out of New York City as a seagoing tug until 6 December 1919. Decommissioned the same month, Montauk was sold 21 May 1920 to the Bisso Towing Co.
