= USS Walter A. Luckenbach =

Cargo ship of the United States Navy

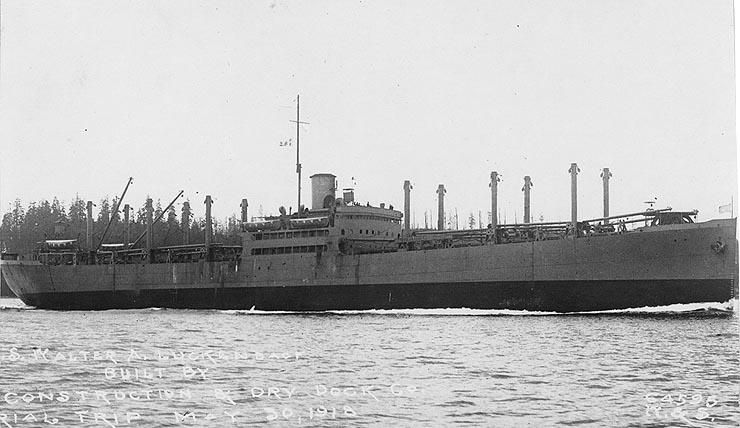
- SS Walter A. Luckenbach on her trails voyage on 30 May 1918

History

United States
- Name: USS Walter A. Luckenbach
- Namesake: Previous name retained
- Builder: Seattle Construction and Drydock Company, Seattle, Washington
- Launched: 19 December 1917
- Completed: 1918
- Acquired: 9 June 1918
- Commissioned: 9 June 1918
- Decommissioned: 28 July 1919
- Stricken: 28 July 1919
- Fate: Returned to owner 28 July 1919; Placed in mercantile service; Probably scrapped in 1958-1959
- Notes: In commercial service as SS Walter A. Luckenbach 1919-1950, as SS A. L. Bisso 1950, and as SS Mardin from 1950

General characteristics
- Type: Cargo ship and troop transport
- Tonnage: 8,286 tons gross
- Displacement: 17,170 tons
- Length: 469 ft 3 in (143.03 m)
- Beam: 55 ft 11 in (17.04 m)
- Draft: 30 ft 7 in (9.32 m) mean
- Propulsion: Steam
- Speed: 14 kn (26 km/h)
- Complement: 70

USS Walter A. Luckenbach (ID-3171) was a United States Navy cargo ship and troop transport in commission from 1918 to 1919.

== Construction and commissioning ==
SS Walter A. Luckenbach was a steamer launched on 19 December 1917 by the Seattle Construction and Drydock Company, Seattle, Washington, for the Luckenbach Steamship Company. The United States Shipping Board took her over early in 1918. She was delivered to the U.S. Navy on 9 June 1918 for World War I service, assigned Identification Number (Id. No.) 3171, and commissioned as USS Walter A. Luckenbach that same day at Seattle.

== World War I service ==
Assigned to the Naval Overseas Transportation Service (NOTS), Walter A. Luckenbach sailed from Seattle on 13 June 1918, but an unsuccessful series of trials forced her to put into the Mare Island Navy Yard at Vallejo, California, for further work and repairs. Those modifications were completed on 18 August 1918, and she returned to sea.

Walter A. Luckenbach entered Mejillones, Chile, and loaded 10,000 tons of nitrates. She departed the Chilean port on 10 September 1918, transited the Panama Canal, and arrived at Norfolk, Virginia, on 24 September 1918. After discharging her cargo and completing voyage repairs, she cleared Cape Henry and Cape Charles on 7 October 1918 and headed for Philadelphia, Pennsylvania. There, she loaded United States Army supplies bound for Europe and, on 29 October 1918, headed for France. After a stop at Gibraltar, Walter A. Luckenbach arrived in Marseille on 14 November 1918, three days after the armistice ending World War I was signed, discharged her cargo, and loaded ballast for the return voyage. She stood out of Marseille on 26 November 1918, stopped briefly at Gibraltar once again, and arrived at New York City on 11 December 1918.

On the day of her arrival, Walter A. Luckenbach was detached from the Naval Overseas Transportation Service and reassigned to the Cruiser and Transport Force. At New York, she was converted to a troop transport to help in the task of bringing home American troops from Europe. By 22 January 1919, she was ready to begin her role in that large movement of people. Between late January and early July 1919, Walter A. Luckenbach made five round-trip voyages to France, two to Bordeaux and three to St. Nazaire. She returned to New York from her final voyage on 11 July 1919.

Walter A. Luckenbach was decommissioned at Hoboken, New Jersey, on 28 July 1919, and was returned to the Luckenbach Steamship Company that same day. Once again SS Walter A. Luckenbach, she entered mercantile service with that company.

== Post-World War I commercial career ==
Walter A. Luckenbach labored in behalf of Luckenbach Steamship Company until 1950, when she changed hands and names twice. First, she was sold to the New Orleans Coal and Bisso Towboat Company, Inc., and briefly served that company as SS A. L. Bisso. Later in the year, the Turkish firm Marsa Ithalat-Ithracat, T.A.S., bought her and renamed her SS Mardin. She served that firm and under that name for the remainder of her mercantile career.

Mardin arrived at Bremen, West Germany, early in 1957 to load cargo, but was not allowed to leave port because of unpaid repair bills. After a lengthy period in custody, she attempted to escape on a stormy, dark night later that year, slipping away from her moorings unannounced, showing no lights, using no tugboat assistance, and with no harbor pilot aboard. She proceeded at full speed down the Weser River, trying to reach international waters in the North Sea before West German authorities could stop her. The harbor police did not realize that she was attempting to escape until she was off Bremerhaven and approaching the open sea, so they used an ex-German Navy patrol boat at Bremerhaven to pursue her. They caught her just before she got beyond the three-nautical-mile (5.6 km) limit of West German territorial waters, boarded her while she was still underway, arrested her master on her bridge, and forced her to return to Bremen. She was once again placed in custody.

Records of Mardin's status after the 1957 incident are unclear as to her fate, but she does not appear ever to have resumed commercial operations. She is believed to have been scrapped in 1958 or 1959.
