= Washington (SP-1241) =

Schooner barge

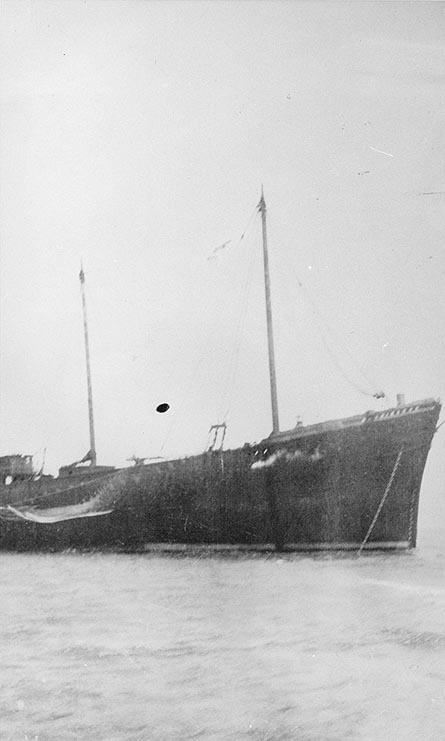
- Washington in commercial use prior to her 1917 United States Navy service

History
- Name: USS Washington
- Namesake: Previous name retained
- Completed: 1879
- Acquired: 18 October 1917
- Fate: Wrecked, 1 December 1917
- Stricken: February 1918
- Notes: Operated as private barge Manuel Llaguno and Washington 1879–1917

General characteristics
- Type: Barge
- Tonnage: 1,724 Gross register tons
- Sail plan: Schooner-rigged

Washington (SP-1241) was a seagoing schooner barge that served in the United States Navy in 1917.

Washington, also named Manuel Llaguno during her long commercial career, was built at Bath, Maine in 1879. While owned by the Luckenbach Steamship Company of New York City and employed in the coastal coal transportation trade, she was taken over by the U.S. Navy for World War I service as Washington on 18 October 1917 and designated SP-1241.

The Navy employed Washington as a seagoing coal barge. On 1 December 1917, while in tow from Hampton Roads, Virginia, with 2,300 long tons (2,300 t) of coal on board, Washington was caught in a heavy snow storm and went aground attempting to enter the Ambrose Channel at New York. Determined to be unsalvageable, she was stricken from the Naval Vessel Register in February 1918.
