= USS Penobscot (SP-982) =

Tugboat of the United States Navy

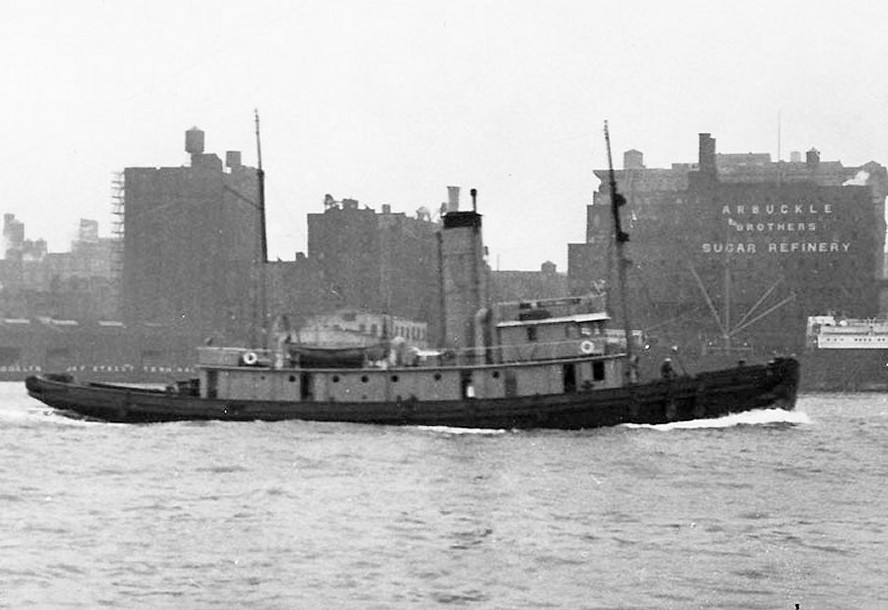
- U.S. Navy tug Penobscot (YT-42) underway c. the later 1930s, probably in New York Harbor area.

History

United States
- Name: USS Penobscot
- Namesake: An Indian tribe of Algonquian stock, inhabitants of eastern Maine
- Owner: Luckenbach Steamship Company of New York City
- Builder: Risdon Iron Works at San Francisco, California
- Laid down: date unknown
- Launched: date unknown
- Christened: as tugboat Luckenbach No. 5; later known as tugboat Dauntless
- Completed: in 1903
- Acquired: by the U.S. Navy and renamed Penobscot
- In service: 29 August 1917 as SP–982
- Out of service: 29 October 1945 at New York City
- Reclassified: YT-42 in 1920; YTB-42 in May 1944
- Stricken: 17 April 1946
- Homeport: Norfolk, Virginia; New York City, New York
- Fate: Turned over to the U.S. Maritime Commission 31 January 1947 for disposal.

General characteristics
- Type: Tugboat
- Tonnage: 269 gross tons
- Displacement: 415 tons
- Length: 121 ft 6 in (37.03 m)
- Beam: 24 ft 6 in (7.47 m)
- Draft: 11 ft 2 in (3.40 m)
- Propulsion: not known
- Speed: 11 knots
- Complement: 38 officers and enlisted
- Armament: one 3-inch gun

USS Penobscot (SP-982/YT-42/YTB-42) was a commercial harbor tugboat purchased by the U.S. Navy at the start of World War I. Penobscot performed her towing services for the 5th Naval District on the U.S. East Coast, and continued to do so for the 3rd Naval District through the end of World War II. She was finally retired from Navy service in 1947.

== Commercial activity ==
The second ship to be so named by the U.S. Navy, Penobscot (SP–982), a 121-foot-long harbor tug, was built as Luckenbach No. 5 by Risdon Iron Works, San Francisco, California, in 1904. Under the name Dauntless she operated on the Pacific Ocean Coast until 1916, then moved to the Atlantic Ocean seaboard.

== World War I service ==
She was acquired by the U.S. Navy from Luckenbach Steamship Company and placed in service 29 August 1917 as SP–982. Through World War I she served as a section patrol craft in the 5th Naval District, operating in Hampton Roads, Virginia, and the Elizabeth River. and in Italian waters during the remainder of World War I.

She also served in Europe, and suffered a fire off Villa Franca, Italy, on 5 October 1918 that took the life of one person.

== World War II service ==
Shortly after World War I she was redesignated YT–42 and assigned harbor duties in the 3rd Naval District. She was slated for replacement in 1939, but war extended her period of use to the Navy. Through World War II she continued to serve the Fleet as a tug in New York Harbor.

== Final decommissioning ==
Redesignated YTB 42 in May 1944, Penobscot remained active until 29 October 1945, when she was placed out of service at New York City. Struck from the Navy List 17 April 1946, she was turned over to the U.S. Maritime Commission 31 January 1947 for disposal.
