= USS Edgar F. Luckenbach =

Chartered troopship of the US Navy (from 1918–1919)

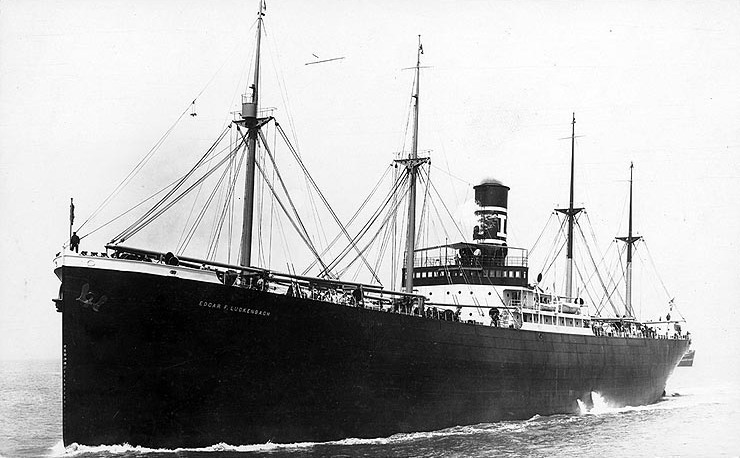
- SS Edgar F. Luckenbach, probably around the time of her completion in 1916.

History

United States
- Name: USS Edgar F. Luckenbach
- Namesake: Previous name retained
- Builder: Newport News Shipbuilding and Drydock Company, Newport News, Virginia
- Launched: 29 March 1916
- Completed: 1916
- Acquired: 11 July 1918
- Commissioned: 11 July 1918
- Decommissioned: 30 October 1919
- Fate: Returned to owner 30 October 1919
- Notes: Served as commercial cargo ship SS Edgar F. Luckenbach 1916-1918 and from 1919

General characteristics
- Type: Cargo ship and troop transport
- Tonnage: 7,923 Gross register tons
- Length: 442 ft 2 in (134.77 m)
- Beam: 57 ft 3 in (17.45 m)
- Draft: 31 ft 6 in (9.60 m)
- Propulsion: Steam engine
- Speed: 12 knots
- Complement: 70
- Armament: 1 × 5inch (127-millimeter) gun; 1 × 3-inch (76.2-millimeter) gun

USS Edgar F. Luckenbach (ID-4597) was a cargo ship and troop transport that served in the United States Navy from 1918 to 1919.

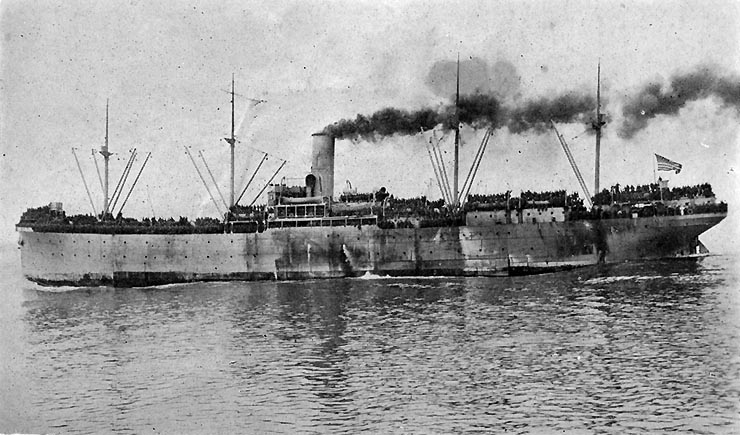
USS Edgar F. Luckenbach in 1919 with her decks crowded with troops returning to the United States from Europe after World War I.

SS Edgar F. Luckenbach, named for her owner Edgar Fredrick Luckenbach, Sr., was built as a commercial cargo ship in 1916 at Newport News, Virginia, by Newport News Shipbuilding and Drydock Company. The United States Army chartered her for World War I service in 1917, and she spent about a year operating for the Army with a U.S. Navy Naval Armed Guard detachment aboard.

On 11 July 1918, Edgar F. Luckenbach was transferred to the U.S. Navy, which commissioned her the same day at New Orleans, Louisiana, as USS Edgar F. Luckenbach. Placed in service with the Naval Overseas Transportation Service, Edgar F. Luckenbach departed New Orleans on 14 July 1918 and joined a convoy at New York City bound for France. She offloaded her U.S. Army cargo at Le Verdon-sur-Mer, La Pallice, Bordeaux, and Royan, then returned to the United States, arriving at Newport News on 26 September 1918. She then made her second and last wartime voyage as a U.S. Navy ship between New York and Marseille, France.

In mid-December 1918, Edgar F. Luckenbach was transferred to the Cruiser and Transport Force to bring home sick, wounded, and convalescent troops from Europe in the aftermath of World War I. She was converted into a troop transport, and from 1 March 1919 to 14 October 1919 she made five such voyages to France.

Arriving at Norfolk, Virginia, at the end of the fifth of these postwar voyages on 14 October 1919, Edgar F. Luckenbach was decommissioned there and returned to her owner on 30 October 1919.

Like most commercial ships commissioned by the U.S. Navy for World War I service, Edgar F. Luckenbach was assigned a Navy registry Identification Number (Id. No.) -- in her case Id. No. 4597—but she appears to have received this designation retrospectively, several years after the conclusion of her U.S. Navy service. It was highest of the many identification numbers in the SP/ID series given to private and commercial ships commissioned during and just after the war.
