= USS Nahant (SP-1250) =

Tugboat of the United States Navy

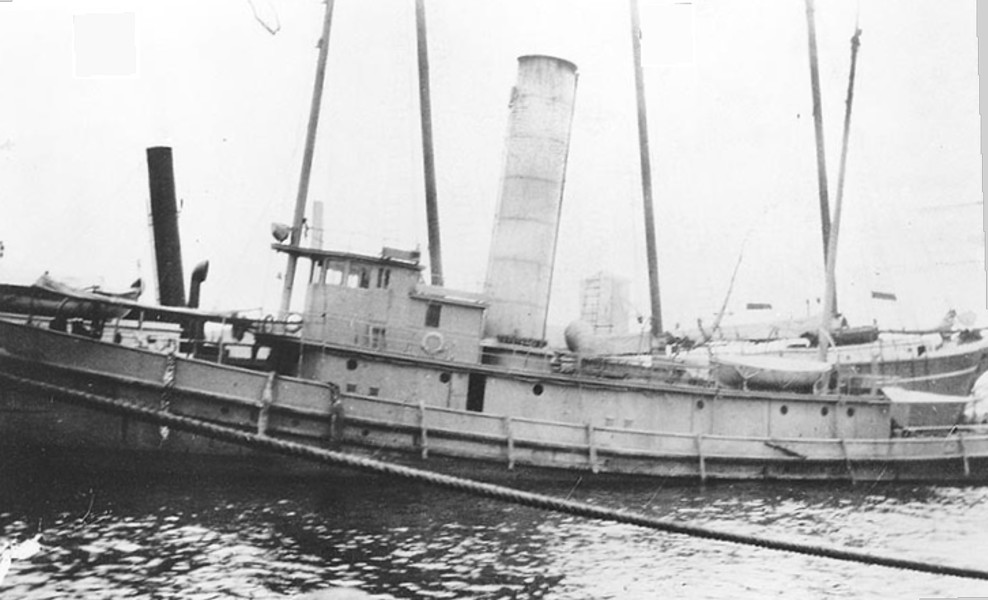
- Luckenbach No. 4 about 1917

History

United States
- Name: 1913: Thomas J. Scully; Luckenbach No. 4; 1917: USS Nahant; 1920: Service No. 3; John F. Harlan; Gotham; W. E. Hunt; Good Fortune
- Namesake: 1917: Nahant, Massachusetts
- Owner: 1913: Scully Towing & Transportation Line; EF Luckenbach; 1913: United States Navy; 1928: Joseph O'Boyle
- Port of registry: 1913: Philadelphia
- Builder: John H Dialogue, Camden, NJ
- Completed: 1913
- Acquired: by the Navy, 1 December 1917
- Commissioned: 12 December 1917 as USS Nahant (SP 1250)
- Decommissioned: 1920
- In service: 1920 (loaned to the City of New York)
- Out of service: 1928 (returned to the Navy)
- Stricken: 27 September 1928
- Identification: US official number 210901; code letters LCSR
- Fate: Sold 1928. Scrapped 1962.

General characteristics
- Type: Tugboat
- Tonnage: 405 GRT, 275 NRT
- Length: 134.7 ft (41.1 m)
- Beam: 26.0 ft (7.9 m)
- Depth: 15.5 ft (4.7 m)
- Propulsion: triple expansion engine
- Speed: 13 knots (24 km/h)
- Armament: One 3-inch gun; Two machine guns

USS Nahant (SP-1250) was a civilian tugboat that the United States Navy acquired in World War I. She was a tugboat in New York Harbor. After the war she was loaned to the City of New York until 1928, when she was disposed of by the Navy.

== Building ==
John H. Dialogue in Camden, New Jersey built the tug as John H. Scully for the Scully Towing and Transportation Line. Her registered length was 134.7 ft (41.1 m), her beam was 26.0 ft (7.9 m) and her depth was 15.5 ft (4.7 m). Her tonnages were 405 GRT and 275 NRT. Scully Towing & Transportation registered her in Philadelphia. Her US official number was 210901 and her code letters were LCSR.

The Luckenbach Steamship Company of New York City acquired the tug and renamed her Luckenbach No. 4.

== World War I ==
On 1 December 1917 the US Navy acquired, renamed her Nahant and gave her the registry number SP-1250. She was commissioned at the beginning of December 1917.

Operating in the 3rd Naval District, Nahant performed towing tasks in New York Harbor for the rest of World War I and into the early post-war era.

== Loan to the City of New York ==
Decommissioning early in 1920, Nahant was transferred to the City of New York and served the Police Department as Service No. 3 and as John F. Harlan.

== Disposal ==
Returned to the Navy in 1928, Nahant was struck from the Naval Register 27 September 1928 and sold to Joseph O’Boyle of New York City 24 December 1928. Subsequently, she enjoyed a lengthy maritime history, changing her name a few times as: Gotham, W. E. Hunt, and Good Fortune. She was scrapped in 1962.

== Bibliography ==
- Lloyd's Register of Shipping. Vol. I. London: Lloyd's Register of Shipping. 1914. THO.
