= USS Gypsum Queen =

Minesweeper of the United States Navy

History

United States
- Name: USS Gypsum Queen
- Namesake: A former name retained
- Owner: J. B. King Transportation Co. of New York City
- Builder: Dialogue & Company, Camden, New Jersey
- Laid down: date unknown
- Completed: 1890
- Acquired: by the Navy, September 1917
- Commissioned: 4 December 1917 at New York City
- Decommissioned: sunk on 28 April 1919
- Stricken: 1919 (est.)
- Fate: Sunk after striking a rock near Armen Light House off Brest, France, 28 April 1919

General characteristics
- Type: Tugboat
- Displacement: 361 long tons (367 t)
- Length: 135 ft (41 m)
- Beam: 27 ft (8.2 m)
- Draft: 14 ft 5 in (4.39 m)
- Speed: 14 kn (16 mph; 26 km/h)
- Armament: 1 × 3 in (76 mm) gun, 2 × .30 in (7.6 mm) machine guns

USS Gypsum Queen (SP-430) was a tugboat acquired by the United States Navy during World War I. She was assigned to the French coast as a minesweeper, as well as a tugboat to provide assistance to disabled Allied ships. Performing this dangerous work, Gypsum Queen struck a rock near Brest, France, and sank, sending 15 crew members to their deaths.

== Constructed in Camden, New Jersey ==
Gypsum Queen — a sea-going tug — was built by Dialogue & Company, Camden, New Jersey in 1890, acquired from her owners, J. B. King Transportation Co. of New York City in September 1917; and commissioned on 4 December 1917 at New York City.

== World War I service ==
Turned over to the 3d Naval District, Gypsum Queen was fitted out for overseas service at New York Navy Yard and subsequently served in French ports as a towing vessel and a minesweeper.

== Sinking ==
While returning from rendering assistance to minesweepers foundering off the coast of France, Gypsum Queen struck a rock near Armen Light House off Brest on 28 April 1919 and sank with a loss of two officers and 13 men.
