= USS Frederick Luckenbach =

Cargo ship of the United States Navy

History

United States
- Name: USS Frederick Luckenbach
- Namesake: Previous name retained
- Builder: J. Readhead and Company, South Shields, England
- Launched: 29 February 1888
- Completed: 1888
- Acquired: 2 October 1918
- Commissioned: 5 October 1918
- Decommissioned: 7 May 1919
- Fate: Returned to owner 1919
- Notes: Served as commercial cargo ship SS Charters Towers, SS San Mateo, and SS Frederick Luckenbach 1888-1918

General characteristics
- Type: Cargo ship
- Tonnage: 2,903 GRT
- Length: 317 ft 6 in (96.77 m) between perpendiculars
- Beam: 40 ft 2 in (12.24 m)
- Propulsion: Steam engine
- Speed: 10 knots (19 km/h; 12 mph)
- Complement: 42
- Armament: 2 × 3 in (76 mm) guns

USS Frederick Luckenbach was a cargo ship that served in the United States Navy from 1918 to 1919.

Frederick Luckenbach was built as a commercial cargo ship in 1888 at South Shields, England, by J. Readhead and Company. She operated under the names SS Charters Towers and SS San Mateo, and by the time the U.S. Navy acquired her at Cardiff, Wales, for World War I service at 5.pm. November 27, 1917 she was named SS Frederick Luckenbach. On 5 October 1918 she was commissioned as USS Frederick Luckenbach.

Frederick Luckenbach carried coal for use by the United States Army from Cardiff and Belfast, Ireland, to French ports until 20 March 1919, when she sailed from Cardiff for New York City. She was decommissioned at New York on 7 May 1919 and returned to her owner.

Unlike most commercial ships commissioned into U.S. Navy service during World War I, Frederick Luckenbach never received a naval registry Identification Number (Id. No.).
