= USS Katrina Luckenbach =

Cargo ship of the United States Navy

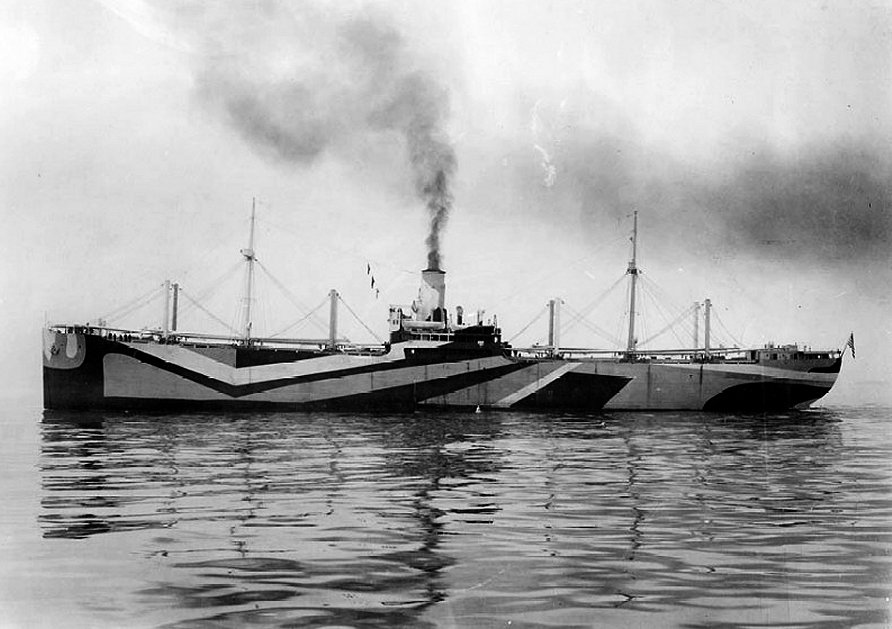
- Katrina Luckenbach in May 1918, around the time of her completion.

History

United States
- Name: USS Katrina Luckenbach
- Namesake: Previous name retained
- Builder: Fore River Shipbuilding Corporation, Quincy, Massachusetts
- Launched: 22 February 1918
- Completed: 1918
- Acquired: 18 May 1918
- Commissioned: 18 May 1918
- Decommissioned: 25 November 1919
- Fate: Returned to owner 25 November 1919; Placed in commercial service; Scrapped 1953
- Notes: Served as commercial cargo ship SS Katrina Luckenbach 1919-1953

General characteristics
- Type: Cargo ship and troop transport
- Tonnage: 8,074 Gross register tons
- Displacement: 16,000 tons
- Length: 468 ft 3 in (142.72 m)
- Beam: 55 ft 11 in (17.04 m)
- Draft: 30 ft 6 in (9.30 m)
- Propulsion: Steam turbine
- Speed: 14 knots
- Complement: 91
- Armament: 1 × 5-inch (127-millimeter) gun; 1 × 6-pounder gun

USS Katrina Luckenbach (ID-3020) was a cargo ship and troop transport that served in the United States Navy from 1918 to 1919.

== History ==
SS Katrina Luckenbach was built as a commercial cargo ship at Quincy, Massachusetts, by Fore River Shipbuilding Corporation for Luckenbach Steamship Company of New York City. Launched on 11 February 1918, she was delivered to Luckenbach in 1918. Soon after her delivery, the U.S. Navy acquired her from Luckenbach on 18 May 1918 for World War I service under a bareboat charter. Assigned Identification Number (Id. No.) 3020, she was commissioned on the day she was acquired as USS Katrina Luckenbach.

Assigned to the Naval Overseas Transportation Service, Katrina Luckenbach departed New York City on 10 June 1918, under the command of Lieutenant Bird Henry Stearns, with a cargo of United States Army supplies for American forces in France. She returned to the United States on 16 August 1918, then underwent repairs. The war ended on 11 November 1918, before her repairs were complete.

In December 1918, Katrina Luckenbach was transferred to the Cruiser and Transport Force for postwar use as a troop transport to assist in returning American troops from Europe. After conversion into a transport, she departed Boston, Massachusetts, on 15 June 1919 with cargo for France. Upon her return to New York, Katrina Luckenbach was decommissioned on 25 November 1919 and was returned to Luckenbach the same day.

Once again SS Katrina Luckenbach, she entered service as a commercial cargo ship. She remained in commercial service until scrapped in 1953.
