= USS K. I. Luckenbach =

Cargo ship of the United States Navy

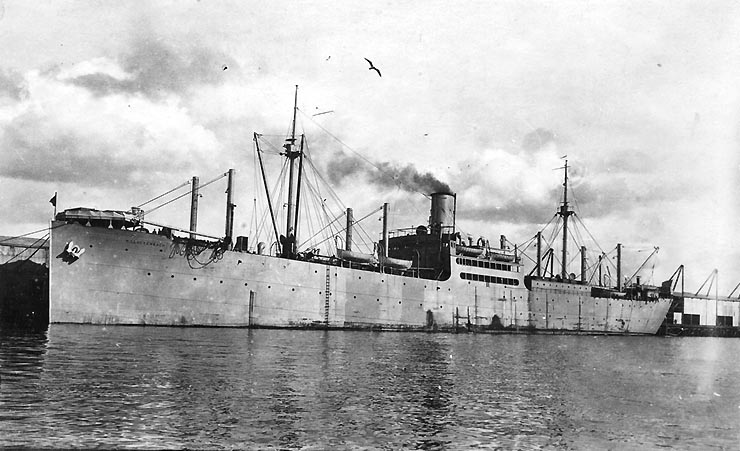
- USS K. I. Luckenbach as a troop transport at Brest, France, in 1919.

History

United States
- Name: USS K. I. Luckenbach
- Namesake: Previous name retained
- Builder: Fore River Shipbuilding Corporation, Quincy, Massachusetts
- Launched: 27 October 1917
- Completed: 1918
- Acquired: 8 August 1918
- Commissioned: 9 August 1918
- Decommissioned: 5 October 1919
- Fate: Returned to owner 5 October 1919
- Notes: Served as commercial cargo ship SS K. I. Luckenbach 1917-1918 and from 1919

General characteristics
- Type: Cargo ship and troop transport
- Tonnage: 9,052 Gross register tons
- Displacement: 16,000 tons
- Length: 468 ft 3 in (142.72 m)
- Beam: 56 ft (17 m)
- Draft: 30 ft 6 in (9.30 m)
- Propulsion: Steam engine
- Speed: 15 knots
- Complement: 99
- Armament: 1 × 6-inch (152-millimeter) gun; 1 × 3-inch (76.2-millimeter) gun

USS K. I. Luckenbach (ID-2291) was a cargo ship and troop transport that served in the United States Navy from 1918 to 1919.

== Construction and early career ==
SS K. I. Luckenbach was built as a commercial cargo ship at Quincy, Massachusetts, by Fore River Shipbuilding Corporation for Luckenbach Steamship Company of New York City. Launched on 27 October 1917, she was delivered to Luckenbach in early 1918. The 3rd Naval District inspected her on 11 February 1918 for possible U.S. Navy World War I service; after she spent several months operating under charter to the United States Army, the Navy acquired her on 8 August 1918. Assigned Identification Number (Id. No.) 2291, she was commissioned on 9 August 1918 as USS K. I. Luckenbach.

== U.S. Navy career ==
Assigned to the Naval Overseas Transportation Service, K. I. Luckenbach served as a cargo ship, supplying the American Expeditionary Force in France. Between 12 August 1918 and 22 December 1918, she made two round-trip voyages carrying general U.S. Army cargo to France.

In December 1918, following her return from the second voyage, K. I. Luckenbach was transferred to the Cruiser and Transport Force for postwar use as a troop transport. After conversion into a transport, she made three round-trip voyages in 1919 to assist in returning American troops from France. She debarked her last soldiers at New York City on 14 September 1919.

On 16 September 1919, K. I. Luckenbach arrived at Norfolk, Virginia, where she was decommissioned on 5 October 1919. She was returned to Luckenbach Steamship Company on the day of her decommissioning.

== Later career ==
The ship resumed commercial service as SS K. I. Luckenbach. Children's author Howard Pease drew upon his service aboard K. I. Luckenbach for his 1927 novel The Jinx Ship.

Midway through 1933, K. I. Luckenbach received press coverage when San Francisco, California, automobile dealer James F. Waters purchased 350 new DeSoto and Plymouth automobiles from the New York distributor and, for publicity purposes, elected to ship them to San Francisco via the Panama Canal, an event that was well publicized by DeSoto's sales office. In an article entitled "DEALER CHARTERS BOAT TO TRANSPORT 350 CARS; San Francisco De Soto Dealer Receives Cars Via Canal, Automobile Topics reported:

"For the first time in the history of automobile business, a boat sailed out of New York Harbor last week flying the house flag of an automobile dealer. It was the K. I. Luckenbach, and from the top of the mast flew the flag of James F. Waters, San Francisco DeSoto-Plymouth dealer who chartered it to carry 350 DeSoto-Plymouth cars to the [United States] West Coast through the canal.

"This record shipment of automobiles to a single dealer is further indication of the upward swing in automotive sales in all parts of the country, according to R. M. Rowland, assistant general sales manager of the De Soto Motor Corporation. 'For instance,' Rowland stated, 'since the first of this year [1933] this one distributor alone has sold more than $2,000,000 worth of automobiles in his San Francisco territory. Waters is of the opinion that sales will hold strong even into November and December [1933]. For this reason he has ordered this shipload of cars to protect his customers for immediate delivery.'

"It is significant that in San Francisco from January to August of this year [1933], out of the first six cars which led in registrations, four of them were Chrysler Motors products. Plymouth was second is sales for this period."
