= USS Julia Luckenbach =

Cargo ship of the United States Navy

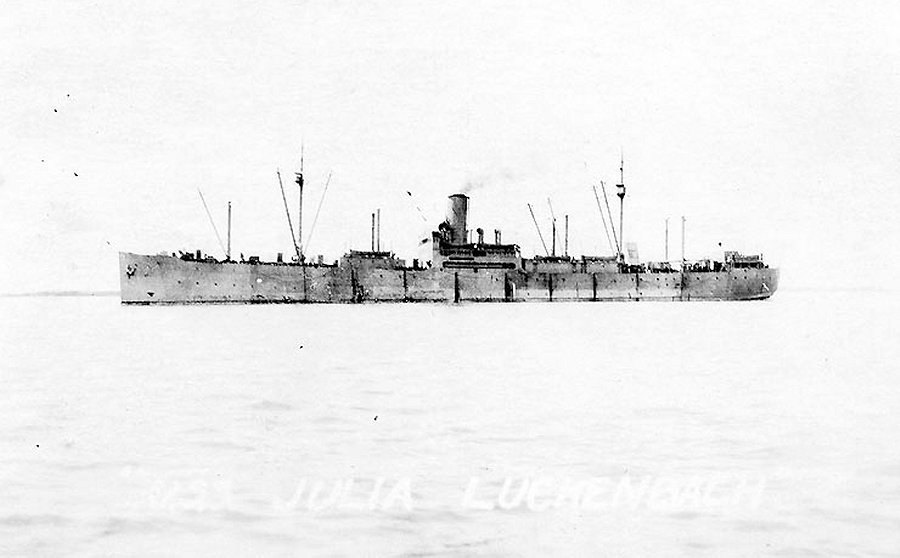
- USS Julia Luckenbach in 1919.

History

United States
- Name: USS Julia Luckenbach
- Namesake: Previous name retained
- Builder: Fore River Shipbuilding Corporation, Quincy, Massachusetts
- Launched: 23 December 1916
- Completed: 1917
- Acquired: 7 August 1918
- Commissioned: 15 August 1918
- Decommissioned: 9 September 1919
- Fate: Returned to owners 9 September 1919; Became "constructive total loss" while in commercial service September 1943
- Notes: Served as commercial cargo ship SS Julia Luckenbach 1917-1918 and 1919-1943

General characteristics
- Type: Cargo ship and troop transport
- Tonnage: 8,151 Gross register tons
- Displacement: 16,533 tons
- Length: 456 ft 6 in (139.14 m)
- Beam: 57 ft 2 in (17.42 m)
- Draft: 31 ft 6 in (9.60 m)
- Propulsion: Steam engine
- Speed: 14 knots
- Complement: 70
- Armament: 1 × 4-inch (102-millimeter) gun; 1 × 3-inch (76.2-millimeter) gun

USS Julia Luckenbach (ID-2407) was a cargo ship and troop transport that served in the United States Navy from 1918 to 1919.

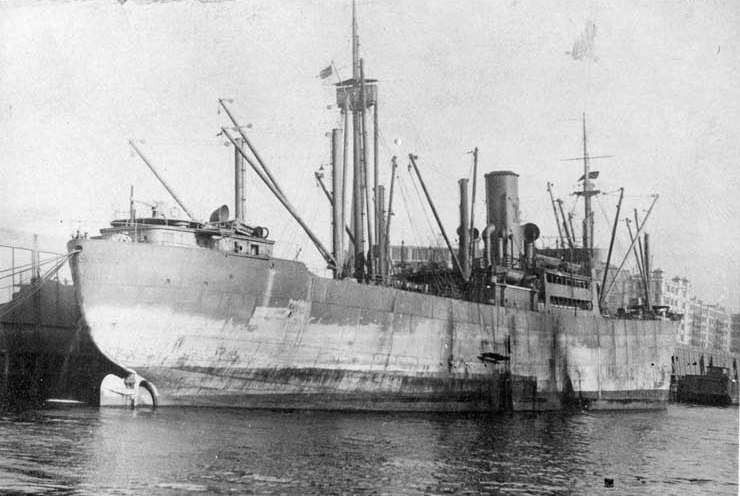
Julia Luckenbach while under U.S. Army charter in 1917 or 1918, prior to her U.S. Navy service.

SS Julia Luckenbach was built as a commercial cargo ship in 1917 at Quincy, Massachusetts, by Fore River Shipbuilding Corporation for Luckenbach Steamship Company of New York City. For about a year in 1917 and 1918, she operated under charter to the United States Army. The U.S. Navy acquired her for World War I service on 7 August 1918. Assigned Identification Number (Id. No.) 2407, she was commissioned on 15 August 1918 as USS Julia Luckenbach.

Assigned to the Naval Overseas Transportation Service, Julia Luckenbach departed New York City on 10 September 1918 with cargo for U.S. military forces in Europe, arriving at Marseille, France, on 24 September 1918.

After the Armistice with Germany was signed on 11 November 1918, bringing World War I to an end, Julia Luckenbach was transferred to the Cruiser and Transport Force. In her new postwar role as a troop transport, she continued to transport cargo to France while returning to the United States with troops, patients, and other military personnel coming home after the war.

Julia Luckenbach arrived in New York at the end of her final cruise in U.S. Navy service in July 1919 and remained there until she decommissioned on 9 September 1919. She was returned to Luckenbach Steamship Company the same day.

Once again SS Julia Luckenbach, she resumed commercial service as a cargo ship, continuing in this role until September 1943 when, during World War II, she was badly damaged and declared a "constructive total loss."
