= USS Aphrodite =

Steam yacht, patrol vessel, and merchant ship

- Aphrodite in 1899

History
- Name: 1899: Aphrodite; 1930: Aetos; 1933: Macedonia
- Namesake: 1899: Aphrodite; 1930: Aëtos; 1933: Macedonia
- Owner: 1899: Oliver H Payne; 1919: Harry Payne Whitney; 1930: Hellenic Coast Lines
- Port of registry: 1899: (United States) New York; 1930: (Greece) Piraeus
- Builder: Bath Iron Works, Bath, ME
- Cost: $450,000
- Yard number: 25
- Laid down: June 1898
- Launched: 1 December 1898
- Sponsored by: Miss Vivien Scott
- Completed: March 1899
- Acquired: for US Navy, 11 May 1917
- Commissioned: to US Navy, 5 June 1917
- Decommissioned: from US Navy, 12 July 1919
- Identification: US official number 107440; 1899: code letters KNWF; 1930: code letters JGPQ; 1934: call sign SVBX
- Fate: Sunk by aircraft, April 1941

General characteristics
- Type: 1898–1927: steam yacht; 1917–19: section patrol; 1930–41: passenger and cargo
- Tonnage: 1901: 1,148 GRT, 654 NRT; 1930: 1,831 GRT, 697 NRT
- Length: 344 ft (105 m) overall with bowsprit; 303 ft (92 m) overall, hull; 260 ft 4 in (79.3 m) waterline
- Beam: 35.6 ft (10.9 m) molded
- Draft: 16 ft (4.9 m) loaded (yacht); about 17 ft 6 in (5.33 m) aft (Navy)
- Depth: 20.1 ft (6.1 m)
- Installed power: 294 NHP
- Propulsion: 1 × triple-expansion engine; 1 × screw
- Sail plan: barque (1899–1910); 17,000 sq ft (1,579.4 m^{2}) sail
- Speed: 15 kn (28 km/h)
- Complement: in US Navy, 68
- Armament: in US Navy: 4 × 3-inch (76 mm) guns; 2 × machine guns

Aphrodite was a steam yacht that was launched in 1898. When completed in 1899 she was the largest steam yacht yet built in the US (1148 tons). In 1917 she was commissioned into the United States Navy as the patrol vessel USS Aphrodite (SP-135). She was based in France from 1917 to 1918; in England from 1918 to 1919; and then returned to her private owner.

In 1927 she was sold to Greek owners, and by 1930 she had been converted into a passenger and cargo merchant ship and renamed Aetos. In 1933 her owners renamed her Macedonia. In 1941 a German air attack sank her during the invasion of Greece.

== Construction ==
Bath Iron Works of Bath, Maine built Aphrodite for Colonel Oliver H. Payne of New York City. The contract for the yacht was signed in January 1898. Payne had chartered the largest US-built steam yacht in 1897 and was impressed by the large seagoing vessel. Bath Iron Works had built that yacht, William A. Slater's Eleanor in 1894. Payne developed requirements for a similar and larger yacht and asked the company to submit a design and price for it. He also requested submissions by other companies, including British yacht builders.

Payne's requirements were for a yacht capable of long ocean cruises with unusually strong construction and capable of a speed of 15 kn (28 km/h) at sea in ordinary weather. Two requirements reflected his preference for sailing. Firstly, the usual large reception rooms in the main deck house were sacrificed for clear deck space, with 6 ft (1.8 m) clearance between the house and rail on each side with a clear view and promenade from stern to bow. The top of the deck house extended over that promenade to the rail providing shelter. Secondly, he specified a barque rig with about 17,000 sq ft (1,579.4 m^{2}) of sail, so that good speed could be maintained under sail alone. (Note: See the drawings in the reference for the sail plan.) Four large ballast tanks were arranged, fore and aft of the machinery space, so that draft and trim could be adjusted suitably for steam or sail combinations. Bath Iron Works submitted the winning design and price for such a yacht, capable of crossing the Atlantic at full speed. In 1910 the original masts were replaced by pole masts, which allowed a reduction in crew.

Construction of a ship shed in which to build the yacht started a month after the contract was signed. She was built as hull number 25. The keel was laid in June, and the hull was launched and christened Aphrodite on 1 December 1898 by Miss Vivien Scott, the daughter of the yacht's commander, Captain C.W. Scott. Aphrodite was the largest and finest US-built steam yacht at the time. She was registered in New York, with the US official number 107440, and code letters KNWF. On 10 March 1899, Aphrodite left the shipyard for sea trials with Bath executives, guests and a 25-man crew. Two weeks later the yacht was officially turned over to the owner.

As built specifications include: length overall, including bowsprit 344 feet (104.9 m), length overall, hull 303 feet (92.4 m), beam, molded 35 feet 6 inches (10.8 m), depth, side, molded 35.6 feet (10.9 m), depth 20.1 feet (6.1 m), normal cruising draft 15 feet (4.6 m), loaded draft 16 feet (4.9 m). Its tonnages were 1,148 GRT and 654 NRT. The hull was divided from main deck down by seven watertight steel bulkheads athwart ship and two similar bulkheads extending from lower deck down to divide the vessel into eighteen water tight compartments. Aphrodite had a flat keel with bilge keels 140 ft (42.7 m) long and 24 in (61.0 cm) deep to dampen rolling. The bow flared above the load water line for better comfort in head seas. Four boilers fed steam to a three-cylinder triple-expansion engine. It was the largest and most powerful then installed in a US pleasure craft, with cylinders of 28 inches (71.1 cm), 43.25 inches (109.9 cm) and 70 inches (177.8 cm), and a stroke of 38 inches (96.5 cm). It was rated at 294 NHP or 3,200 horsepower at about 132 revolutions, and drove a four bladed right hand bronze propeller cast as a single piece.

Contract speed was 15 kn (28 km/h). Sea trials in a snowstorm producing a mean speed of 15.53 kn (28.8 km/h) including slowdowns, and 16.8 kn (31.1 km/h) excluding slowdowns, even though hull cementing for best speeds had not been completed. Cabin finishing joiner work, hull cementing were done in New York after the yacht arrived there on 29 March 1899 for interior decoration and final touches. Coal bunkers were sufficient for an Atlantic crossing at a steady 15 knots. Cost of the yacht were $450,000 for construction and about $10,000 per month operating expenses.

== Yacht Aphrodite ==
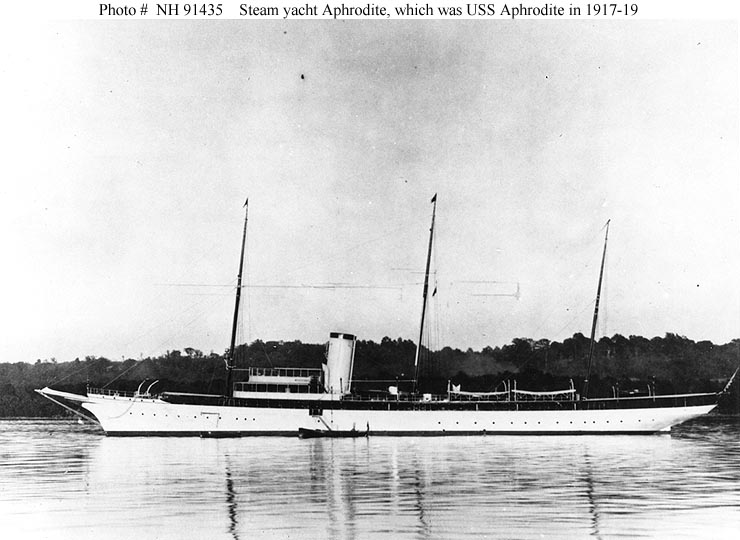
Aphrodite as a private steam yacht, sometime between 1910 and 1917. Note change in masts from original plan.

Aphrodite was described as a "sea palace" with the design by Bath Iron Works' Charles R. Hanscom merging Payne's requirements for an unusually seaworthy vessel with luxury and beauty. Critics noted the yacht was not as beautiful as some, and perhaps not worthy of the name. The yacht had been explicitly designed for ocean cruising rather than coastal entertainment, with Payne expressing the desire to sail Aphrodite around Cape Horn.

Despite the absence of a luxurious main saloon usual on such large yachts, the craft was amply arranged for Payne's focus on long distance, ocean cruising. The 160 ft (48.8 m) deckhouse was steel, with mahogany paneling. The main social room was the dining saloon that occupied the forward 30 ft (9.1 m) of the deckhouse. It was 17 ft (5.2 m) wide, with galley, pantries, ice machine, drying room and upper engine space aft. Two 16 by 10 ft (4.9 by 3.0 m) guest rooms with private baths, and the owner's 16 by 16 ft (4.9 by 4.9 m) quarters with private bath were aft. The entire starboard length of the deckhouse was connected by an inside passage connecting the spaces. Below, aft of the engine room, were four 14 by 14 ft (4.3 by 4.3 m) and two 14 by 10 ft (4.3 by 3.0 m) guest staterooms with private baths. Servants quarters were also in that area. Above the main deckhouse was a 32 ft (9.8 m) deckhouse, accessible by interior stair, with wheelhouse, chart room, and smoking room. Chilled provisions for long voyages were kept in separate refrigerated spaces for meat, fowl and fish in the main hold. Electric power was provided by two 110 Volt steam-powered generating sets.

After a cruise around the world in Aphrodite, Payne visited Europe each summer until war restricted his cruising to US waters in 1914. Payne cruised the oceans, but apparently laid the yacht up during at least some winters. The yacht is described during the winter of 1900 at Red Hook, Brooklyn's Erie Basin as "covered from stem to stern with an awning of heavy canvas passing over the main boom aft and made fast to the bulwarks all around. Only her bridge, small boats and tall masts are exposed to the weather, and even the boats have substantial covers to protect their interiors", waiting with other yachts for the summer season. Payne turned the yacht over to the Navy 11 May 1917 under a free lease for war service. He never saw the yacht again, as he died the next month, 27 June 1917, the day the craft reached France.

== Navy service ==
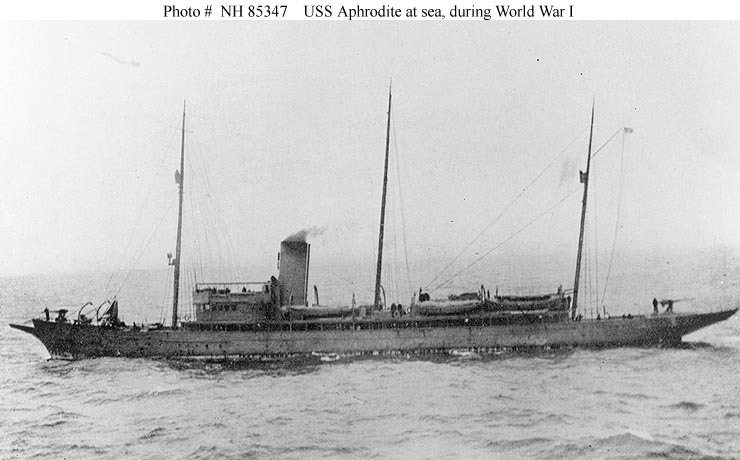
USS Aphrodite at sea in World War I

The US Navy acquired Aphrodite on 11 May 1917 for use as a patrol vessel in World War I. She was commissioned at New York City on 5 June 1917 as USS Aphrodite (SP-135). She was assigned to a group of eight large yachts to become US Naval Forces Operating in French Waters. They were Aphrodite, USS Christabel (SP-162), Corsair (SP-159), Harvard (SP-209) Kanawha II (SP-130), Noma (SP-131), Sultana (SP-134) and Vedette (SP-163).

On 14 June 1917 the first convoys carrying elements of the American Expeditionary Force left for Saint-Nazaire, France in four groups. Aphrodite was part of the escort for the second group. She reached St. Nazaire on 27 June 1917. on 30 June she was ordered to Brest to serve under the senior French naval commander there until arrival of the group's commander, Captain William B. Fletcher, who would command the squadron.

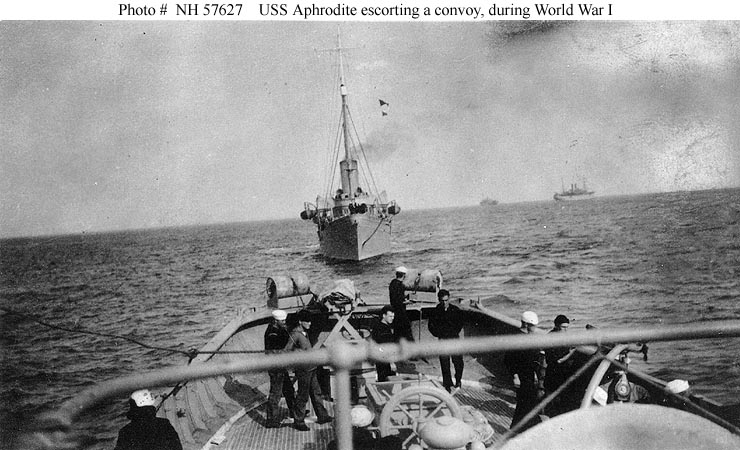
USS Aphrodite seen from the stern of another converted yacht while escorting a convoy in World War I

Aphrodite and Corsair left St. Nazaire, arriving at Brest on 1 July. The armed yacht patrol force was operational on 14 July and began patrolling the Bay of Biscay, escorting coastwise convoys and meeting convoys arriving from the US to escort them safely into Brest, Le Verdon-sur-Mer, or St. Nazaire. During these operations Aphrodite rescued survivors of victims of German U-boats. On 16 February 1918 she was reassigned to a base at Rochefort, from which she was an offshore escort until 28 March 1918. She was then assigned to Division 7, Squadron 3, Patrol Force, based at Le Verdon-sur-Mer. She was a convoy escort along the French coast for the remainder of the war.

After the Armistice of 11 November 1918, Secretary of the Navy Josephus Daniels wired Vice Admiral Sims that a number of yachts, including Aphrodite, were free of their leases and should be returned to the US if practicable. Regardless, on 30 November, she was ordered to Harwich, England. She served as station ship there and at Portland.

On 10 January 1919 Aphrodite struck an anchored mine while in passage to Germany, but on 11 January she reached Wilhelmshaven, Germany. On 13 January she went to Cuxhaven, arriving twodays later. She remained in Germany until she returned to Southampton, England on 22 February. She moved to Harwich in March, then returned to Germany, and was the station ship at Hamburg.

On 31 May 1919 Aphrodite was ordered to return to New York, where she arrived on 29 June 1919. She was decommissioned at the Fleet Supply Base at Brooklyn, on 12 July 1919 and returned the same day to her new owner, Harry Payne Whitney, who had inherited most of his uncle's estate.

== Later history ==
Original fittings and furnishings stripped before naval service had burned in a warehouse fire during the war. Whitney had the yacht refitted, and cruised aboard until 1927. She remained registered in the name of "Payne Whitney" until 1927. The 1928 edition of Lloyd's Register of Yachts recorded Aphrodite's owner as "The Executors of the late Payne Whitney". Harry did not die until 1930, but his elder brother William Payne Whitney died in 1927. Aphrodite may therefore have belonged either to William, or to both brothers jointly.

In 1927 Apostolos Riggas of Piraeus, Greece bought Aphrodite. (Note: US register closing with 30 June 1927 shows Aphrodite among Vessels Sold to Aliens indicating sale was no later than that fiscal year.) By 1930 Hellenic Coast Lines owned her, and she had been renamed Aetos. She was registered in Piraeus, with the code letters JGPQ. By 1933 Hellenic Coast Lines had renamed her Macedonia, and by 1934 the call sign SVBX had superseded her code letters.

The former yacht, with cargo and passengers, was sunk by German aircraft 22 April 1941 (Note: Date varies in references. Reference Historisches Marinearchiv citing Greek sources has 22 April with extensive description: "22.04.1941 with captain Athanassios Armyras in command and with 55 passengers, the ship was attacked at Spilia on the island of Trisonia in the bay of Korinth, Greece, by the German Luftwaffe with incendiaries and bombs, severely damaged and set afire. Little time later, the burning steamer was beached where it sank later. One loss, Ioannis Hatziris (Sailor). After the war, scrapped by O.A.N. (Greek demolition committee).") at Trizonia in the Gulf of Corinth near Patras, Greece.
