= Eleanor (1894 ship) =

Former yacht and U.S. Navy vessel

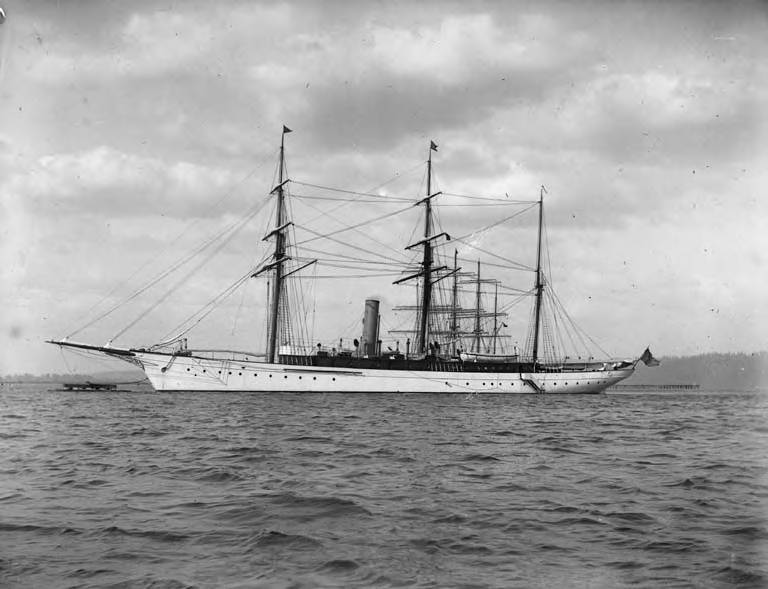
- Yacht Eleanor

History

United States
- Name: Eleanor 1894; Wacouta 1900; Harvard 1917
- Owner: William A. Slater, 1894; Charlotte Cardeza, 1898; James J. Hill, 1900; George F. Baker, 1917; Olympia Shipping Corp., 1919
- Builder: Bath Iron Works
- Cost: $300,000
- Launched: 7 May 1894
- Identification: Official Number: 136473; Signal letters: K.M.C.J.

Greece
- Name: Athinai
- Owner: A. K. Riggas, 1921; Hellenic Coast Lines Co., Ltd., 1930
- Home port: Piraeus
- Identification: Signal Letters: J.D.M.N.
- Fate: Sunk by German aircraft, April 1941

General characteristics as built in 1894
- Tonnage: 804 gross tons, 402 net tons
- Displacement: 1,136 tons
- Length: 240 ft (73 m)
- Beam: 32 ft (9.8 m)
- Draft: 14 ft 2 in (4.32 m)
- Installed power: 1,000 Horsepower steam engine
- Propulsion: Propeller
- Sail plan: Barque
- Speed: 14.5 knots

Eleanor was the largest yacht ever built in the United States when she was launched in 1894. The people who owned, chartered, and sailed aboard her during her career as a yacht were among the richest and most powerful in the United States.

The ship was leased to the United States Navy during World War I. She was commissioned as the U.S.S Harvard. She was sent to the coast of France where she patrolled the approaches to ports receiving troops and supplies from America. While she saw no combat, she did rescue dozens of men from ships sunk by U-boats, and supervised German compliance with the naval terms of the surrender after the armistice.

After the war she was converted into a passenger ship and sailed among the Greek islands. Just after the start of the German invasion of Greece in April 1941 she was sunk by the Luftwaffe at Itea, Greece.

== Construction and characteristics ==
Eleanor was commissioned by Willam A. Slater of Norwich, Connecticut, scion of a wealthy textile manufacturing family. She was designed by naval architect Charles Ridgley Hanscom.

Eleanor was ordered on 29 July 1893, and her keel was laid on 5 October 1893. She was built by Bath Iron Works and launched in the Kennebec River on 7 May 1894. The ship was christened by Eleanor Slater, William Slater's 9-year old daughter, and the ship's namesake. Eleanor was delivered on 6 October 1894. The contract with Bath Iron Works for the ship was reported to be for $300,000, with the cost of art and other fittings running as much as another $150,000. She was the largest American-built yacht at the time of her launch.

Eleanor's hull and deckhouse was built of steel plates, riveted together. She was 240 feet (73 m) long overall, and 220 feet (67 m) long between perpendiculars. Her beam was 32 feet (9.8 m), her depth of hold was 17.5 feet (5.3 m), and her draft was 14 feet, 2 inches. Her gross register tonnage was 803.81 and her net register tonnage was 401.91. She displaced 1,136 tons. Here hull was built with eighteen watertight compartments.

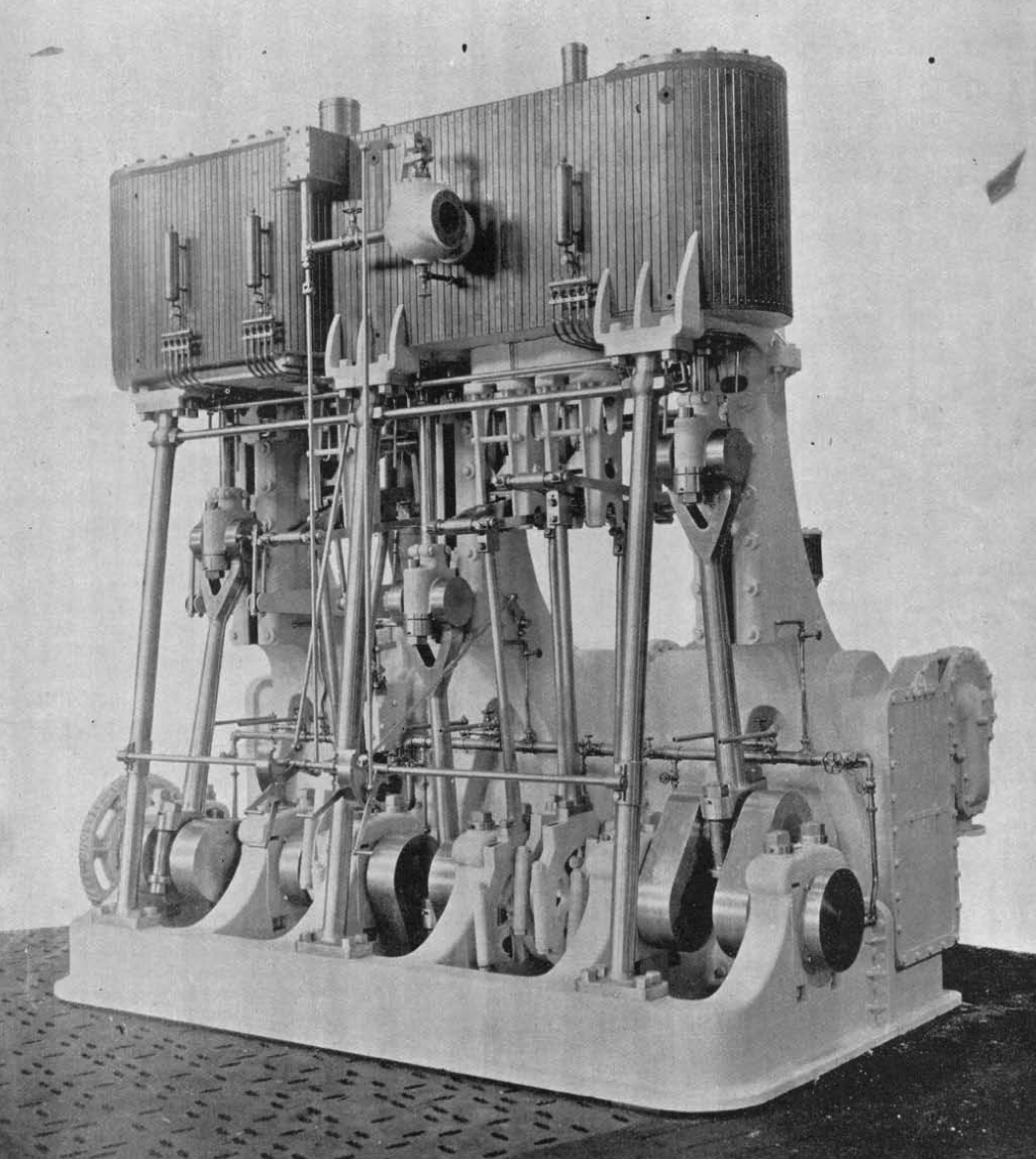
Eleanor's steam engine

Propulsion was provided by a single direct-acting triple-expansion steam engine. The engine had high, medium, and low-pressure cylinders of 18, 28, and 45 inches, with a stoke of 30 inches. The engine drove a single four-bladed bronze propeller 10 feet, 4 1/2 inches in diameter. Steam for the engine was produced by two coal-fired Scotch boilers, each 12 feet, 6 1/2 inches long by 12 feet, 5 inches in diameter. The ship only required one boiler to operate, the second providing redundancy in case of a failure. The engine produced 1,000 horsepower and could drive the ship at 14.5 knots. She had capacity for 280 tons of coal, which gave her an unrefueled range of 3,800 nautical miles.

Slater intended to sail around the world in Eleanor, so one of his requirements was that she be rigged with enough sail to continue this journey even if coal for her boilers was unavailable, or her engine failed. The ship was rigged as a three-masted barque. Her total sail area was 13,215 square feet (1,227.7 m^{2}). In a good breeze, she could reach 8 knots under sail.

Steam power also ran the electric generators aboard. As with the boilers, there were two generators in case one failed. Steam also powered the anchor windlass and steering gear.

Her fresh water tanks held 22,000 US gallons (83,000 L). She had an ice-making plant, a 60-gallon per day fresh water distiller, and a steam laundry. Cabin heat was provided by steam radiators.

Eleanor carried seven tenders aboard: a 28-foot steam launch, a 25-foot naphtha launch, two 29-foot lifeboats, a 28-foot six-oared gig, a 20-foot dinghy, and a 20-foot catboat for pleasure sailing.

In 1897 her crew was reported to be 52 people, including a captain, first and second officers, physician, three engineers, a carpenter, four quartermasters, a boatswain, fifteen seamen, four firemen, two mess men, three oilers, six stewards, four cooks, a barber, two laundrymen, and two boys.

Given her proposed circumnavigation, some of which passed through dangerous waters, she was armed with two Driggs-Schroeder 1-pounder guns, a Colt electric Gatling gun, and small arms for the crew.

The deckhouse contained a dining room with sofas, a fireplace, and piano. A social hall, smoking room, pantry, galley, the laundry, and the captain's stateroom and dining room were also in the deckhouse. A stairway down from the social hall led to the main salon.

Berths for 32 crewmen were built in the forecastle on the forward berthing deck. Aft of the forecastle were staterooms for the petty officers. Further aft were two guest staterooms, and the officers' staterooms and dining room. Aft of the forward berthing deck were the boilers, coal bunkers, and engine room. The aft berthing deck contained two suites, including the owner's accommodations, just aft of the engine room bulkhead. Aft of the suites was the main salon which had its own fireplace and piano. Further aft were accommodations for the children's governess, nurse, and other female servants. Guest accommodations were luxurious, finished with a variety of hardwoods and marble.

== Yachting history ==
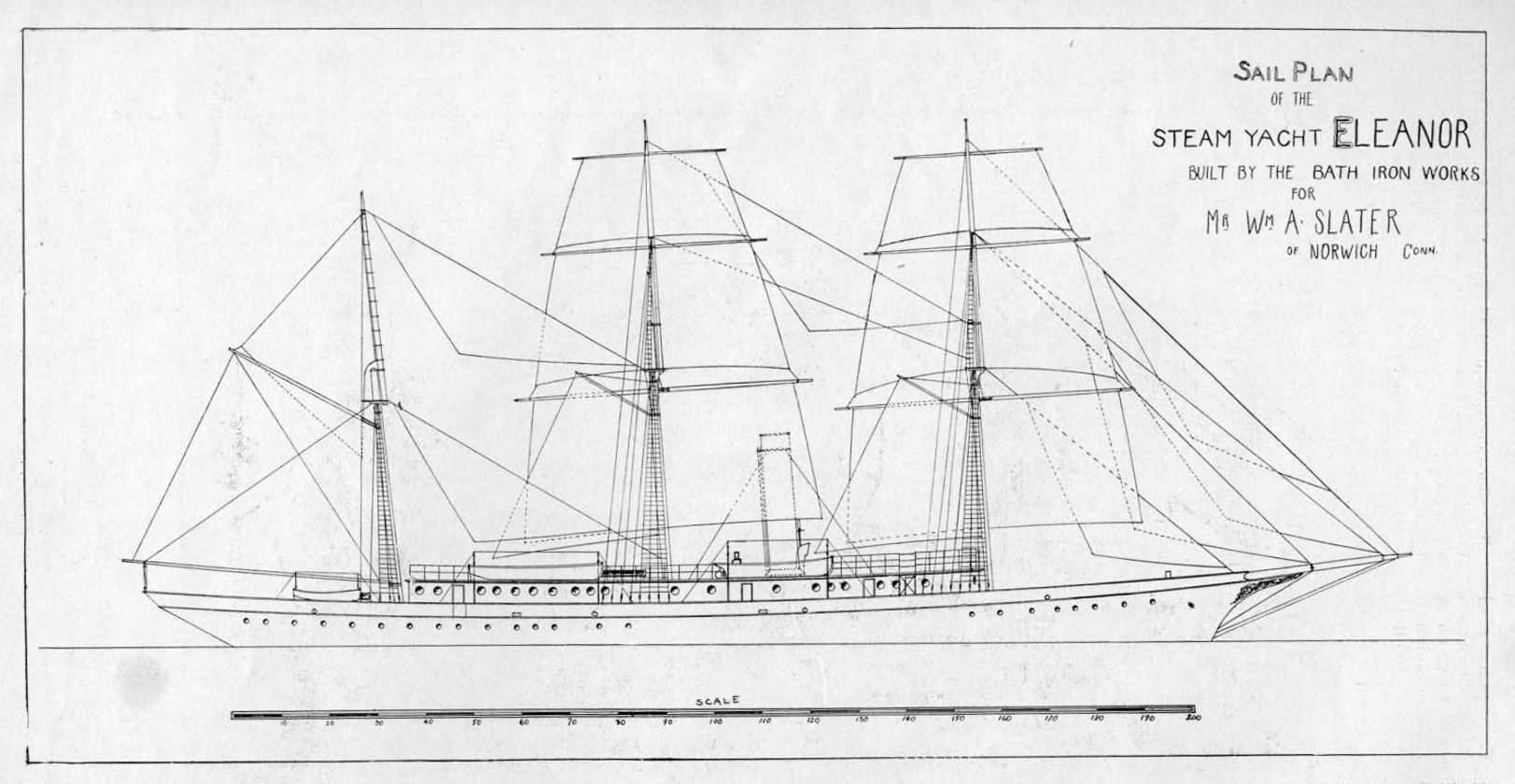
Eleanor's original sail plan as a barque

=== William A. Slater ownership (1894–1898) ===
Eleanor was the largest yacht ever built in America when she was launched, and the second costliest American yacht after Valiant, William K. Vanderbilt's steamer. She was conspicuous, and generated a wide range of reactions. To the people of Maine who built her at Bath Iron Works, she was an object of pride, a proof that their skill was equal to the British shipyards that were the world leaders at the time. In 2025, 131 years after her launch, the ship had her own page on the Bath Iron Works website. Much of the newspaper coverage of the time fawned over her luxurious appointments, describing her as "magnificent" and "palatial". Some commentary was critical of Slater and other millionaires for "burning money" on their "toys". Slater himself did not appear to address social issues regarding Eleanor, except as it regarded the ship's provenance. He insisted that the ship be built in America, even though it cost him more money.

==== Slater circumnavigation (1894–1896) ====
Slater, his family, and a number of friends left New London, Eleanor's home port, for a round-the world cruise on 24 October 1894. Her first stop was the island of Madeira. She went on to Marseilles, Naples, Messina, Port Said, Suez, Aden, Colombo, Bombay, Penang, Singapore, Hong Kong, Shanghai, Manila, Nagasaki, Yokohama, Honolulu, Hilo, and arrived in San Francisco on 23 July 1895.

Eleanor sailed from San Francisco to Tacoma, arriving on 1 August 1895. The Slater's and their guests skipped this voyage and traveled by train to Tacoma where they reembarked. From here the ship headed up the Inside Passage, stopping in Seattle, Port Townsend, Vancouver, Comox, Bella Bella, Prince Rupert, Wrangell, Port Alexander, Juneau, Sitka, and Glacier Bay. She arrived back in San Francisco, sailing direct from Victoria, on 13 September 1895.

The ship underwent a period of major maintenance while moored at Pier 9, the Broadway dock, in San Francisco. Her cruise went on to Monterey, Santa Cruz Island, Santa Barbara, San Diego, and then back to San Francisco. The Slaters left the ship in San Francisco and took the train back to Norwich, arriving on 28 November 1895.

Eleanor sailed south from San Francisco, without her owner, on 7 December 1895 to reach the Atlantic via the Strait of Magellan. She stopped at San Diego, Callao, Valparaiso, Montevideo, Pernambuco, and Saint Thomas, arriving back at New London on 10 March 1896, after a cruise of 42,406 nautical miles. After this two-year cruise, the ship returned to Bath Iron Works for dry-docking and major maintenance. William Slater's health declined, and so he did little more with his yacht.

==== Robert D. Ballentine charter (1896) ====
Robert D. Ballantine, heir to the Ballantine Brewing fortune, chartered Eleanor for the 1896 summer yachting season. He used her to sail to various ports between New York and Martha's Vineyard, and to participate in the annual New York Yacht Club cruise. At the end of the season, the ship anchored in Manhasset Bay, New York.

==== Colonel Oliver H. Payne charter (1897) ====
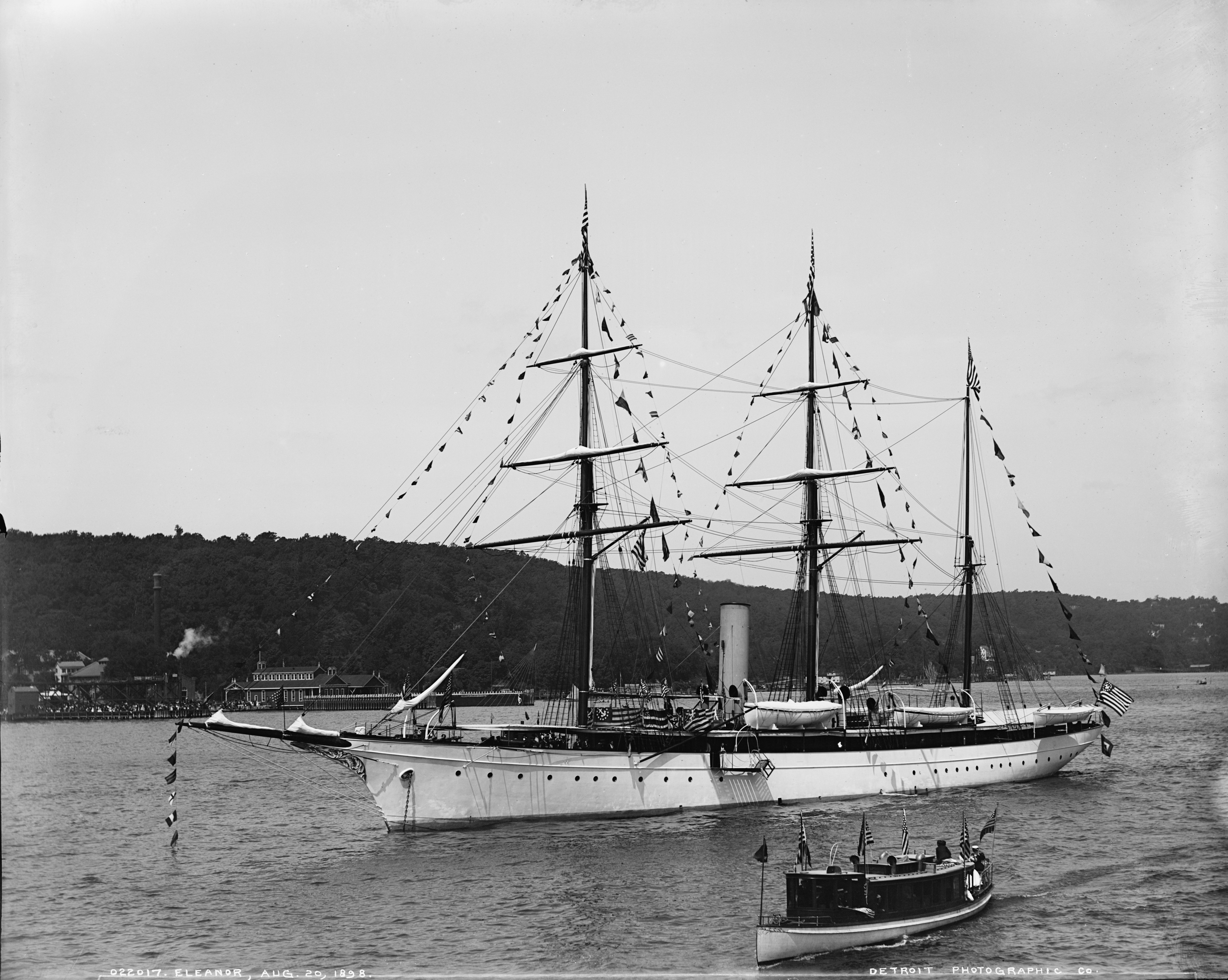
Eleanor dressed to lead the naval parade on 21 August 1898

Businessman Oliver H. Payne chartered Eleanor for the 1897 summer yachting season. She sailed from New York on 19 June 1897. Her ports of call on Payne's three-month trans-Atlantic trip included the Azores, London, Le Havre, Leith, Bergen, Hammerfest, Wisby, Stockholm, Cronstadt, St. Petersburg, Kiel, Hamburg, Rotterdam, Maderia, and Bermuda. The ship arrived back in New York on 5 October 1897. Payne found Eleanor so much to his liking that he commissioned Bath Iron Works to build a similar vessel, the Aphrodite, which displaced Eleanor as the largest yacht ever built in the United States.

==== Colonel Oliver H. Payne charter (1898) ====
Payne chartered Eleanor for a second time in 1898, while his new yacht was under construction. Her first trip that season was to the Thames River to watch the Yale crew team compete. Payne's nephew, Payne Whitney, was captain of the team. Eleanor then cruised the northeast, with stops at Bath, Quebec City, Halifax, and Bar Harbor. Colonel Payne's guests included Payne Whitney and Senator Mark Hannah. On 21 August 1898, Eleanor led the naval procession up the Hudson River to welcome home the U.S. Navy ships which fought the Spanish fleet in Cuba.

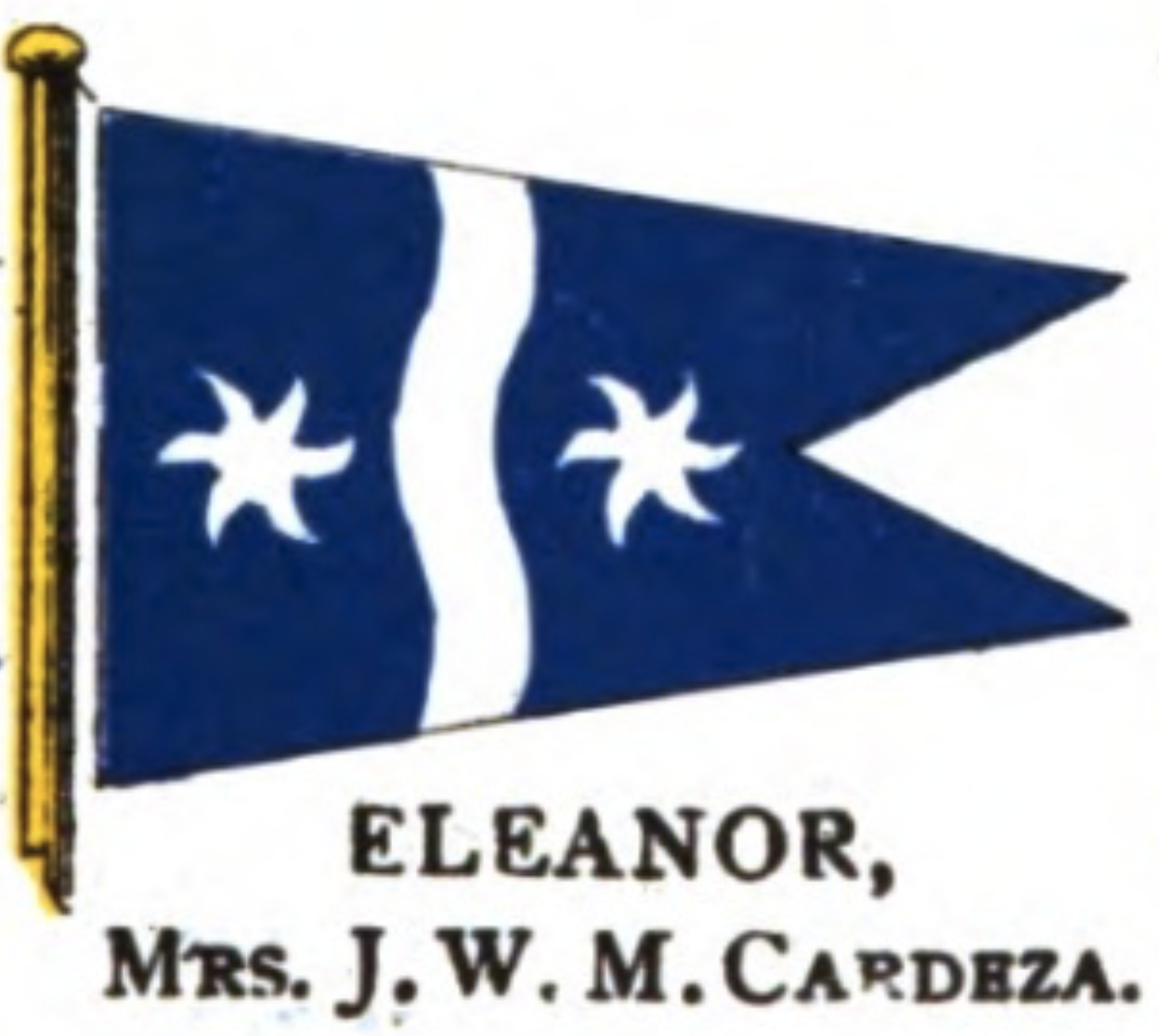
Charlotte Cardeza's private signal flew on Eleanor when she was aboard

=== Charlotte Cardeza ownership (1898–1900) ===
Charlotte Wardle Cardeza (nee Drake), was the only child of a successful textile manufacturer. She and her only child, Thomas, inherited his fortune in 1890. She purchased Eleanor from William Slater in September 1898. She gained not only a yacht, but a measure of social prominence in New York society; she was admitted to the Atlantic Yacht Club in the same class as J. P. Morgan.

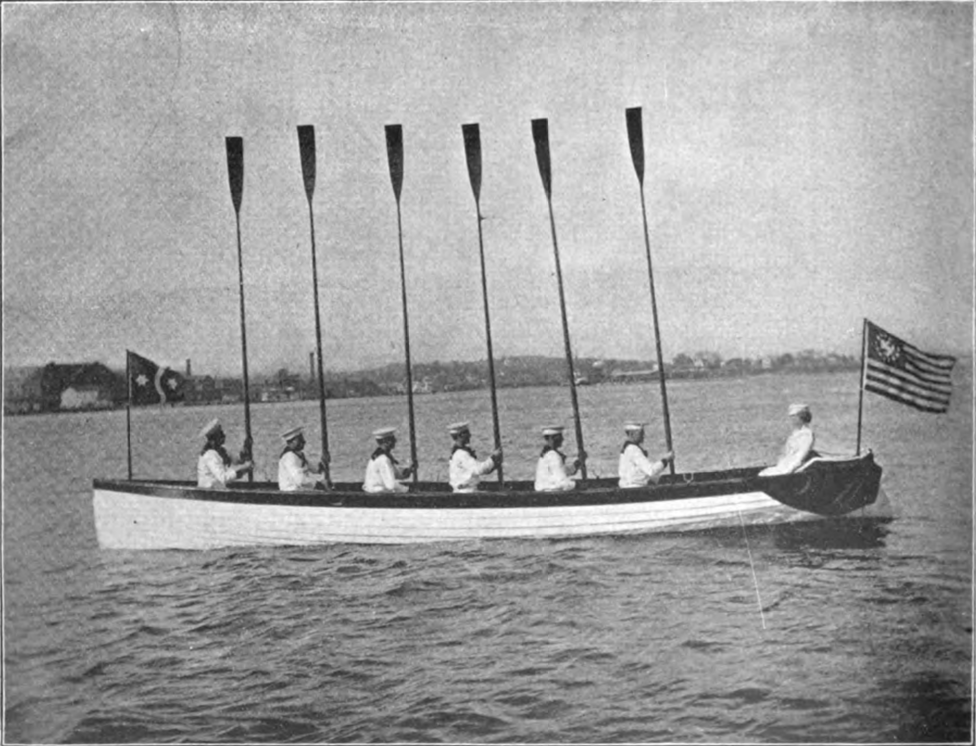
Eleanor's six-oared gig. Cardeza's private signal is flying, suggesting that she is the figure in the stern.

Cardeza first put the ship to use on an extended Caribbean cruise during the winter of 1899. She joined the ship in Charleston, South Carolina in January 1899. During the cruise, the ship made port calls in Savannah, Key West, Tampa, Jacksonville, Nassau, St. Thomas, St. Croix, Guadeloupe, Dominica, Martinique, St. Lucia, Barbados, Caracas, Ponce, Kingston, and Havana. From Havana she sailed directly to Savannah, Georgia, arriving 4 April 1899. Cardeza and her party left the ship there and returned home to Philadelphia by train.

After a maintenance period in New York, Cardeza sailed north on 9 July 1899 along the northeast coast. The ship stopped at Newport, Vineyard Haven, Nantucket, Portland, Bar Harbor, Halifax, Charlottetown, Sydney, and Boston. This was Cardeza's last major trip aboard Eleanor, but she is known in later years still connected with the sea as one of the survivors of the Titanic sinking.

=== James J. Hill ownership (1900–1917) ===
James J. Hill was most prominent as a railroad magnate and financier, and was one of America's richest men. While his home was in St. Paul, Minnesota, his business and financial interests frequently took him to New York City. He had a passion for fishing, and as he grew older, a desire to spend more time with his family. A New York-based yacht answered a number of these desires. He purchased Eleanor for $150,000 and took ownership on June 14, 1900. Hill renamed the ship Wacouta, after a chief of the Red Wing band of the Dakota.

Shortly after acquiring his new yacht, Hill sent her from New York through the Saint Lawrence River and into the Great Lakes. This trip included port calls in Buffalo, Detroit, and Duluth. After a summer in freshwater, Wacouta arrived in New London on 1 October 1900, and went immediately into the shipyard.

During the winter of 1900-1901, Hill spent $21,450.86 on substantial modifications of the ship. The sail plan was changed from a barque to a fore-and-aft schooner rig, which reduced the number of crew required. A pilot house was added to enclose the bridge. Her steering equipment was replaced. Carpets and bathtubs were replaced. Engines were upgraded in the ship's boats which were used for Hill's fishing outings.

There were no circumnavigations on Hill's agenda. He mostly used the ship as a floating headquarters for annual salmon fishing trips to the Riviere Ste. Jean in Quebec. He returned from his 1904 vacation with 193 salmon in the ship's refrigerator. 1907's cruise was even better at 444 salmon. Two large wooden tanks were built on Wacouta for the 1909 fishing trip. Salmon were kept alive in these until the ship reached Boston and New York. Hill directed Captain Weed to distribute the fresh fish packed in ice and sawdust to friends in each city.

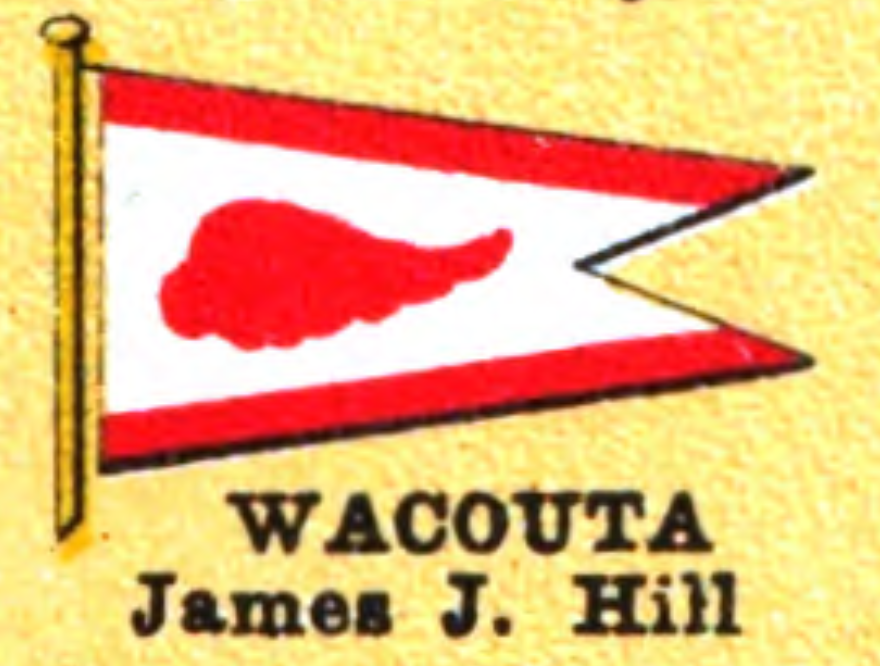
James J. Hill's private signal, a red wing, flew on Wacouta

Many of his guests on these outings were family and personal friends. Some were prominent in business and government, including former President Grover Cleveland, former Secretary of War Daniel S. Lamont, George B. Harris, president of the Chicago, Burlington, and Quincy Railroad, Charles Steele, a partner of J. P. Morgan's, Dr. George D. Stewart, president of the American College of Surgeons, Minnesota businessman William H. Dunwoody, and George F. Baker, president of the First National Bank of New York. Samuel Throne, an early investor in Hill's railroads, and the former president of the Pennsylvania Coal Company joined for several of the annual outings. At age 79, he died aboard Wacouta on the 1915 fishing trip. Hill's wide-ranging business interests kept him pressed for time. Since fishing was a primary focus of his trips on Wacouta, he sometimes postponed them if fishing was reported to be bad. In June 1907 Wacouta was docked at Montreal, awaiting Hill's arrival by train. Instead, Captain Weed received a telegram from Hill saying that he had decided not to come until conditions for fishing were better. Schedule pressure often forced Hill to meet and leave the ship in Montreal, where a train could take him faster than Wacouta. He retired as chairman of the Great Northern Railway in 1912, allowing him more time to spend on his yacht. That summer he sailed back from Canada aboard Wacouta and stopped in Sag Harbor to visit his daughter Ruth in Southampton.

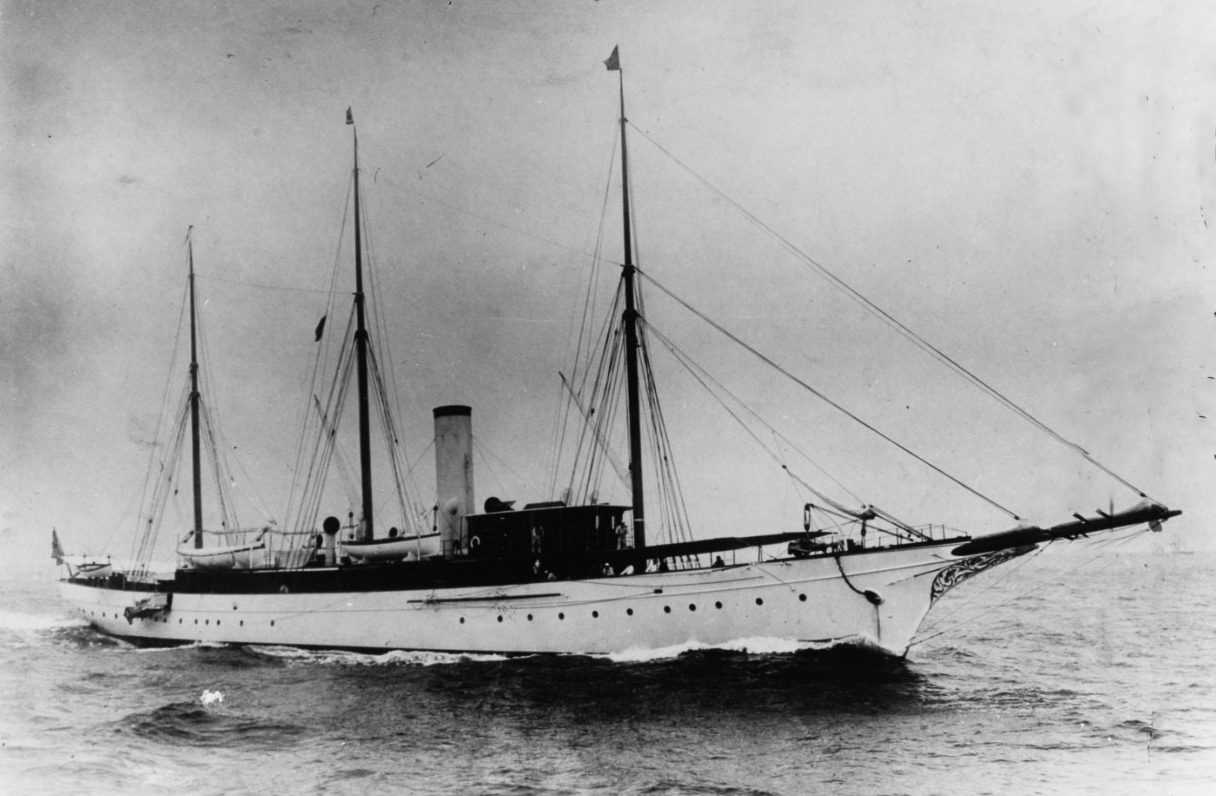
Wacouta, rigged as a schooner, lost the yardarms of Eleanor

Hill also took shorter trips aboard Wacouta, including a cruise to Mount Desert Isle in 1903. He lent the ship to family and friends for special events. For example, Wacouta's 1901 season began with a wedding cruise for Hill's second son, Louis. His son James and daughter Clara watched the 1903 America's Cup defense from the deck of Wacouta. Hill placed the yacht at the disposal of the Governor General of Canada, Earl Grey, and his guest, Earl Roberts, during a visit of the Prince of Wales to Quebec City in 1908. Wacouta was chartered by banker Mortimer L. Schiff for a fall cruise in 1913.

Hill used Wacouta relatively infrequently in the summer and not at all in the winter. As a matter of economy, he paid off the crew at the end of each yachting season and the ship sat idle for half the year. Since in most years he used the yacht only for the annual fishing trip, she was often laid up earlier than most of the pleasure fleet, sometimes as early as August. In many off-seasons the ship was idled at Shaw's Cove in New London, Connecticut.

Wacouta began 1916 as she normally did, tied up for the winter in Shaw's Cove. She began fitting out for the new season in April, as usual, with fresh paint. She had her annual inspection by the Steamboat Inspection Service. She was prepared for her annual fishing trip when, on 29 May 1916, James J. Hill died. The ship returned to Shaw's Cove and did not sail again for the Hill family.

== U.S. Navy service (1917–1919) ==
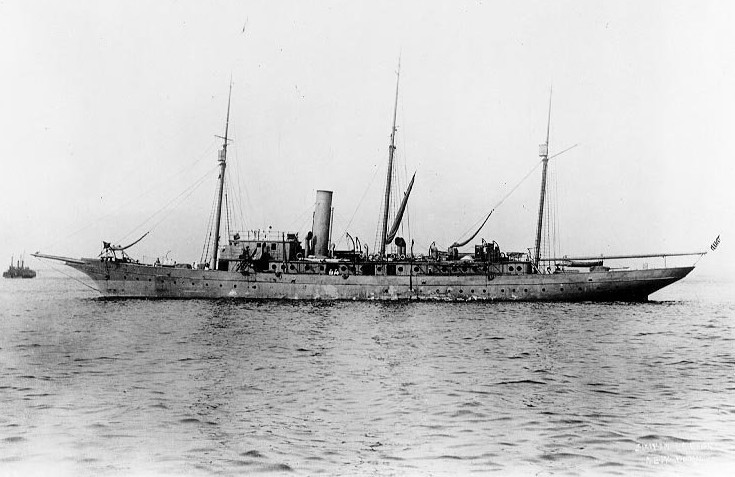
USS Harvard during World War I

George F. Baker purchased Wacouta for $100,000 on 28 March 1917 and immediately leased her to the U.S. Navy. On 3 April 1917, the ship was towed to the Brooklyn Navy Yard where it began a refit for patrol duty. The ship was fitted with additional armament which included four 3-inch/50-caliber guns, and four 1-pounder guns. Wacouta was renamed Harvard and commissioned on 10 May 1917 at New York City. She was assigned the pennant number SP-209.

Baker's generosity was part of a patriotic trend among wealthy yacht owners. Harvard was assigned to U.S. Patrol Squadron Operating In European Waters along with seven other newly-armed yachts, including Corsair III (owned by J. P. Morgan), Sultana (owned by Mrs. Edward H. Harriman), Noma (owned by Vincent Astor), Aphrodite (owned by Oliver Payne), Christabel (owned by Irving T. Bush), Kanawah II (owned by John Borden, heir to a Chicago real estate and mining fortune), and Vedette (owned by Frederick W. Vanderbilt).

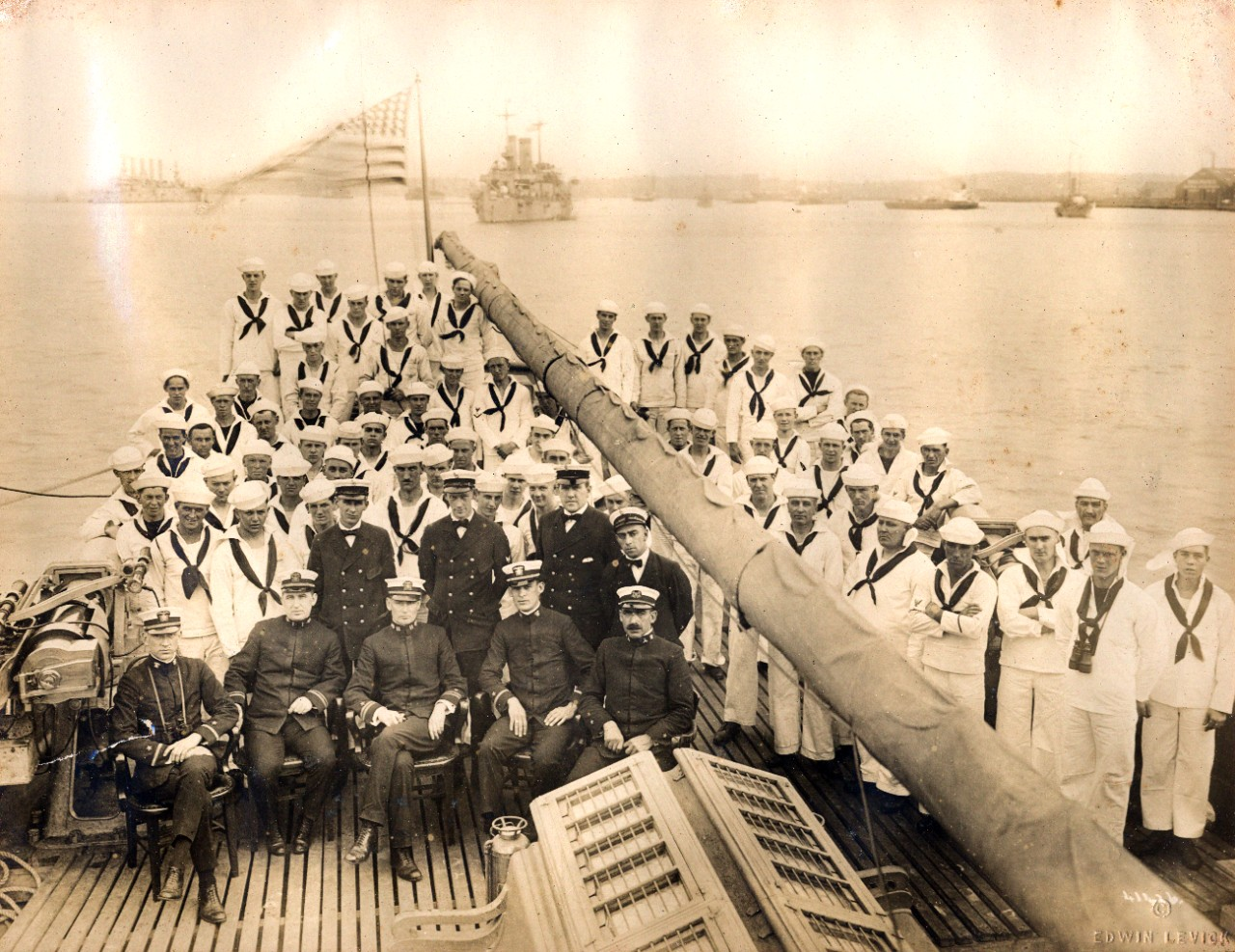
The crew of USS Harvard a day before they sailed for France in June 1917. Note the 3" guns visible on the left and right.

After being fitted out for overseas service, Harvard departed the Navy Yard on 4 June 1917. She sailed with a convoy of six converted yachts from Tompkinsville, Staten Island on 9 June 1917 for Bermuda, which she reached on 12 June. She sailed from there to the Azores, where she stopped again for coal. Harvard arrived at Brest, France, 4 July 1917.

On her first day of patrol duty in France, 16 July 1917, she picked up 59 survivors from the ill-fated British steamship Trelissick. The ship was carrying a cargo of grain from Boston to St. Nazaire. Trelissick had been torpedoed and sunk by UC-72 on 15 July, after having rescued some 30 men from another torpedoed British ship, Exford, the day before. Harvard returned the survivors from both ships safely to Brest.

A coal barge punched a 6-inch by 2-inch hole in Harvard's hull on 13 August 1917. Flooding was stopped by a temporary plug, but the ship had to go into dry dock for permanent repairs. In the fall of 1917 she continued patrol and convoy escort duties, largely between Brest and La Pallice. She assisted the torpedoed merchantman Texas on 29 November 1917 and searched for survivors of the sinking of Hundaago, a Norwegian steamship, on 4 August 1918.

On 21 November 1918, Harvard was reassigned from Brest to Harwich, England. After the armistice, German U-boats were directed to surrender at Harwich. Harvard was one of the allied ships there that served as a base for the officers inspecting the submarines beginning on 29 November 1918.

Harvard became the flagship of Squadron Three, Patrol Force under Captain Samuel S. Robison on 26 December 1918. She conveyed inspection teams to German bases to see that the terms of the naval armistice were being met. She left Harwich on 7 January 1919 and arrived at Hamburg on 11 January. She also stopped at Vegesack, and Heligoland before returning to Harwich on 18 January 1919.

On 31 March 1919 Harvard sailed from Harwich with a diplomatic mission to the Baltic countries. She passed through the minefields which had been cleared, through the Kiel Canal and stopped at Copenhagen. She reached Libau in the newly-constituted country of Latvia on 9 April 1919.

On 30 April 1919, Vice Admiral William Sims, commander of U.S. Naval forces in Europe, reported that he had established a special service force under Samuel S. Robison to oversee German compliance with the terms of the naval armistice. This appears to be a formalization of the work that Robison and Harvard been doing since November.

Harvard had eight commanding officers during her naval service. Two of them, Commander A. G. Stirling, and Lieutenant Commander V. D. Chapline, were recommended for a Navy Cross for "important, exacting, and dangerous duty of transporting and escorting troops and supplies through waters infested with enemy submarines and mines." Another of Harvard's commanding officers, Lieutenant Commander Aaron S. Merrill, rose to the rank of vice-admiral.

On 3 July 1919, Harvard sailed from Brest for New York. The Navy decommissioned Harvard on 26 July 1919, and returned her to George F. Baker. He sold the ship to the Olympia Shipping Company of New York in August 1919 for $75,000, $65,000 of which was borrowed from the Equitable Trust Company.

== Commercial service ==
=== Olympia Shipping Corporation ownership (1919–1921) ===
Olympia Shipping sent Harvard to the shipyard of Ocean Engines and Boiler Works of Manhattan both to repair wear and tear from her Navy service and to ready her for use as a commercial vessel. Olympia Shipping failed to pay for the work which resulted in a judgement against the company of $93,329 in March 1921. The company also failed to pay its debt to Equitable Trust, which won a judgement of $77,594 in January 1921. By the middle of 1921 Harvard had been sold.

=== Apostolos K. Riggas Ownership (1921–1929) ===
A. K. Riggas renamed the ship Athinai (Αθήναι), after the city of Athens. He reflagged her as a Greek ship, and moved her home port to Piraeus. Athinai was refit as a coastal passenger ship. She could carry as many as 93 passengers among the Greek isles from Thessaloniki in the northeast to Argostoli in the southwest.

=== Hellenic Coast Lines Company, Ltd. ownership (1929–1941) ===
Competition among Greece's small inter-island shipping firms was intense. In May 1929, a number of them, including A. K. Riggas, consolidated their fleets into Hellenic Coast Lines Company, Ltd. The combined firm had at its disposal 33 ships, including Athinai, which it was able to manage more profitably by coordinating sailings and eliminating competition.

On 6 April 1941 Germany invaded Greece. Athinai was bombed and sunk by the Luftwaffe in the harbor at Itea, Greece on 22 April 1941. Some sources suggest she may have been salvaged and was still sailing in 1948, but the 1946 Lloyd's Register of Shipping lists Athinai as "Sunk (War Loss)".

==== Historical confusion ====
At the beginning of World War II in Europe there were two ships named Athinai whose homeport was Piraeus. One was the ex-Harvard owned by Hellenic Coast Lines Company, Ltd. with a gross tonnage of 968. This ship is the subject of this article. The other was the ex-Scottish Prince, a freighter owned by Hellenic Lines, Ltd. with gross tonnage of 2,897. Some accounts of ex-Harvard's last years confuse the two ship histories. ex-Scottish Prince was captured near Messina on 28 October 1940, the first day of the Greco-Italian war, by the Italian Navy torpedo boat Simone Schiaffino and was renamed Palermo. She was managed as a freighter for the Italian government by Soc. Anon. Cooperativa di Nav. Garibaldi of Genoa. Germany seized the ship on 19 September 1943, just after the Italian surrender. She was sunk by a mine near Trieste in May 1944.
