= USS Alcedo =

First American vessel lost in World War I

Coordinates: 47°23′N 4°44′W

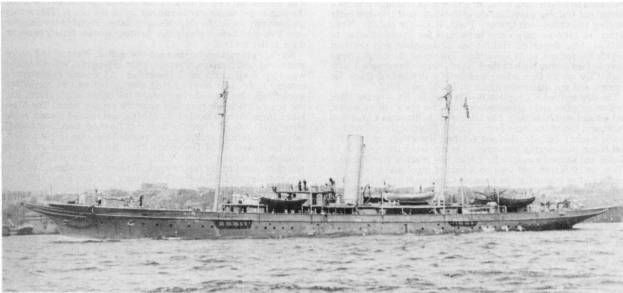
- USS Alcedo

History

United States
- Name: USS Alcedo
- Builder: D. and W. Henderson and Company, Glasgow
- Launched: 24 June 1895
- Acquired: by purchase, 1 June 1917
- Commissioned: 28 July 1917
- Stricken: 17 December 1917
- Fate: Sunk 5 November 1917

General characteristics
- Type: Yacht
- Displacement: 981 long tons (997 t)
- Length: 275 ft (84 m)
- Beam: 31 ft (9.4 m)
- Draft: 16 ft 4 in (4.98 m)
- Speed: 12 kn (14 mph; 22 km/h)
- Complement: 94 officers and enlisted
- Armament: 4 × 3 in (76 mm) guns, 2 × machine guns

USS Alcedo (SP-166) was a yacht in the United States Navy. She was the first American vessel lost in World War I.

Alcedo was built as SY Veglia in 1895 at Glasgow, Scotland, by D. and W. Henderson and Company for the banker Nathaniel de Rothschild. She was purchased by the Navy on 1 June 1917 from Mr. George W. C. Drexel of Philadelphia, Pennsylvania, and commissioned at New York City on 28 July 1917.

== Service history ==
Assigned to the Patrol Force, Alcedo departed Newport, Rhode Island on 5 August 1917. Steaming via Newfoundland and the Azores, the yacht arrived at Brest, France on the 30th. During her brief Navy career, the yacht conducted anti-submarine patrols and convoy-escort missions along the French coast. On two occasions, she rescued crew members of torpedoed merchantmen. On 17 October, the little warship picked up 118 men from the troop transport steamer SS Antilles, which had been sunk by a submerged German U-boat. Twelve days later, she saved another 85 survivors from SS Finland.

On the afternoon of 4 November, Alcedo departed Quiberon Bay, France with Aphrodite, Noma, and Kanawha II as the escort for a convoy composed of SS Florence Luckenbach, SS Artemis, and SS Newport News bound for Brest. At about 01:45 the following morning, while the convoy was steaming some 75 mi (121 km) west of Belle He, an Alcedo crewman reported sighting a surfaced U-boat. Almost instantaneously with the sounding of the alarm, the German submarine UC-71 fired a single torpedo in a surface attack. (Some Alcedo records suggest that the U-boat submerged first, but the official German account confirms a surface attack.) Alcedo attempted to change course to evade the torpedo, but she answered her helm sluggishly. The torpedo struck the yacht on the port side well forward, and Alcedo began to settle fast. Soon after the hit, the ship's commanding officer ordered her abandoned, and she went down in eight minutes. The yacht lost one officer, Lieutenant, junior grade John Melvin, and 20 sailors in the action to both wounds and drowning. The remainder of her crew took to the boats in two separate groups. After a long time rowing, one group — which included the commanding officer — was picked up by a French torpedo boat. The other was towed to safety by French fishermen. Future National Football League player Roy White was one of the crew members.

Alcedo's name was struck from the Naval Vessel Register on 17 December 1917.
