= USS Melvin =

USS Melvin may refer to the following ships operated by the United States Navy:

- USS Melvin (DD-335), a Clemson-class destroyer, launched in 1921 and struck in 1930.
- USS Melvin (DD-680), a Fletcher-class destroyer, launched in 1943 and struck in 1974.
