= USS Noma =

Patrol vessel of the United States Navy

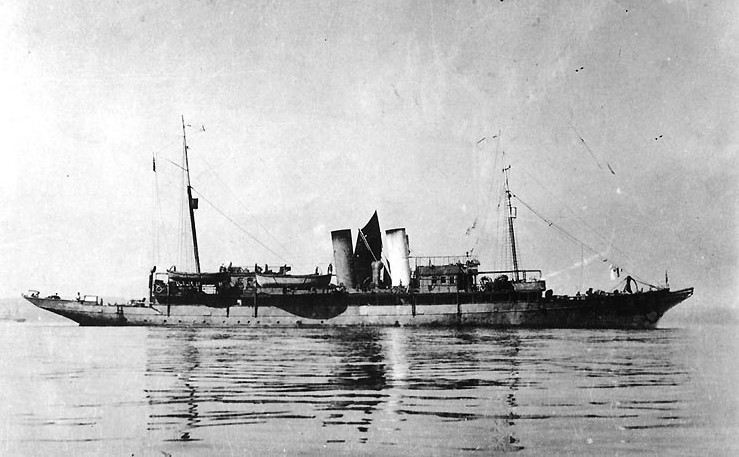
- USS Noma (SP-131)

History

United States
- Name: 1902–c. 1927 Noma; c. 1927–1933 Vega
- Owner: 1902–1911 William Bateman Leeds; 1911–1912 John Jacob Astor IV; 1912–1919 Vincent Astor; 1919-c. 1927 Rodman Wanamaker; c. 1927-1933 Nelson B Warden
- Port of registry: New York
- Builder: Burlee Dry Dock Company of Staten Island, New York
- Yard number: 235
- Launched: 11 February 1902

History

United States
- Name: USS Noma
- Acquired: May 1917
- Commissioned: 10 May 1917
- Decommissioned: mid-July 1919
- Fate: Returned to owner 15 July 1919

History

Italy
- Name: Salvatore Primo
- Owner: 1933–1940 Unione Italiana di Salvataggio, Trieste; 1940–1943 Italian Navy
- Port of registry: Trieste
- Acquired: 1933
- Fate: Sunk by aircraft torpedo 21 June 1943

General characteristics
- Type: Yacht
- Tonnage: 763 GRT
- Displacement: 1250 tons
- Length: 262 ft 6 in (80.01 m)
- Beam: 28 ft 6 in (8.69 m)
- Draft: 15 ft 6 in (4.72 m)
- Installed power: Two triple expansion steam engines
- Propulsion: Twin screws
- Speed: 19 kn (35 km/h; 22 mph)
- Complement: 80
- Armament: Four 3” guns; Four machine guns

USS Noma (SP-131) was the private steam yacht Noma, built in 1902 on Staten Island and loaned to the U.S. Navy during World War I as a patrol craft assigned to protect shipping from German submarines. At war's end she served the American Relief Commission in Constantinople and the Black Sea before being returned to her owner after decommissioning. In the 1930s she was converted to a salvage tug, owned in Italy as Salvatore Primo, and torpedoed during World War II.

== Construction and service as a private yacht ==
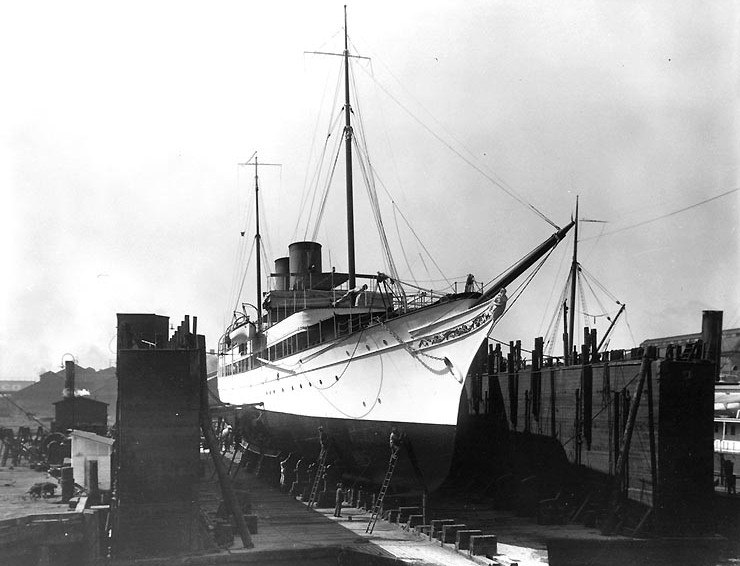
Noma docked in San Francisco in 1915

Noma was a large steam yacht, designed by Tams, Lemoine & Crane and built by the Burlee Dry Dock Co. of Staten Island, New York, Yard No. 235, and launched on 11 February 1902. She was built for William Bateman Leeds, the "Tin Plate King", who had married Nonnie May Stewart Worthington in 1900 and the following year sold his tin-plate business to US Steel for $40 million.

The yacht measured 763 GRT when built, with a length of 70.2 meters (230.3 ft)(pp) and 80.0 meters (262.5 ft)(oa), a beam of 8.7 meters (28.5 ft), and a draft of 4.7 meters (15.4 ft). Noma's two 4-cylinder triple expansion steam engines, also made by Burlee Dry Dock, totaled 518 nhp, drove twin screws and gave her a speed of 19 knots.

Leeds died in 1908 and in 1911 Noma was bought by John Jacob Astor IV, though his ownership was short-lived as he died in the sinking of Titanic the following year, and the yacht passed to his son, Vincent Astor.

== United States Navy service ==
After the United States entered World War I in April 1917, Noma was loaned to the Navy by Vincent Astor, who was commissioned as an officer in the Navy and served aboard her as a junior officer. The yacht was outfitted by the Navy with military equipment, including heavy guns, and commissioned as USS Noma (SP–131) on 10 May 1917 and assigned to the North Atlantic. She was ordered to France as the flagship of Capt. William B. Fletcher, Commander U.S. Patrol Squadrons operating in European waters. She sailed from New York City 9 June 1917 accompanied by five other ships of her squadron: Christabel, Harvard, Kanawha II, Sultana, and Vedette.

=== Anti-submarine duty ===
Upon arriving at Brest on 4 July 1917, Noma immediately commenced operating in the submarine danger zone, convoying troop transports and cargo vessels. While patrolling off Cape Finisterre on 20 July 1917, she sighted a German U-boat running awash and attacked it. On 25 July Noma escorted a large American convoy from Belle Île to the River Loire.

Noma next encountered a German submarine when she went to the aid of British Q-ship HMS Dunraven on 8 August. At the time the vessel was being shelled and torpedoed by the enemy submarine. Dunraven’s commanding officer, Capt. Gordon Campbell, RN, credited Noma’s arrival and prompt depth charge attack with saving his ship. Noma stood by Dunraven until two British destroyers arrived, and took off several wounded sailors.

Noma came upon a large German U-boat recharging her batteries on 16 August and engaged her in a vigorous gun duel until the U-boat submerged. On 17 September she next sighted a medium-sized German submarine watching for convoys close inshore, and in a dawn attack, straddled it with many salvos. While escorting store ships Koln and Medina, westbound for France on 28 November, Noma in company with Wakiva II engaged two German submarines. Noma depth charged her contact while Wakiva II seriously damaged the other U-boat. Noma and Wakiva II were commended for distinguished service by both Rear Admiral Henry B. Wilson and Admiral William S. Sims. Lt. Comdr. Leahy was awarded the Navy Cross for his role in the battle.

Noma continued to screen convoys in 1918, and escorted Madawaska to St. Nazaire on 25 January. She later accompanied a convoy of 13 merchant ships westbound for the U.S. and returned on 21 May with a group of 8 ships bound for La Pallice. Noma's last combat with German submarines occurred 15 August when two ships of eastbound Convoy HB–8, West Bridge and Montanan, were torpedoed; Montanan sank, but West Bridge was towed in to Brest.

=== Post-war operations ===
After the war Noma was temporarily stationed at Plymouth, England until she was transferred to U.S. Forces based at Constantinople in early 1919. She passed Gibraltar on 26 January; stopped at Taranto and Malta; and arrived Constantinople on 13 February, bringing with her members of the American Relief Commission. Between February and May 1919 she supported the American Relief Commission during its operations in the Black Sea.

Once at Constantinople her duties involved carrying commission members to Constanţa, Romania 9–14 March; to Varna, Bulgaria 3–6 April, and to Batum, Russia 21 April–1 May. Noma also removed American gold funds from Varna and took on board U.S. Army personnel at all three ports.

Noma departed Constantinople for the U.S. on 21 May. She was decommissioned in mid-July 1919 and was returned to her pre-war condition and then returned to her owner at New York City on 15 July 1919.

== Later service as a yacht and salvage tug ==
After Noma's return to Vincent Astor, he sold her to the department store magnate Rodman Wanamaker and by early 1920 she was being extensively overhauled and improved at South Brooklyn, again supervised by Tams, Lemoine & Crane. In 1923 Noma was chartered to William Beebe for his first expedition to the Galápagos Islands. In about 1927, Noma was sold to Nelson B. Warden and renamed Vega.

In 1933 Vega was sold to Wilhelm Schuchmann of Hamburg, owner of the German towage and salvage company Bugsier Reederei-u. Bergungs AG, for conversion to a salvage tug. Later that year she was sold to the Trieste-based company Unione Italiana di Salvataggio, in which Bugsier had a 25% holding, then renamed Salvatore Primo and stationed at Messina.

Requisitioned by the Italian Navy in May 1940, Salvatore Primo was sunk at Palermo on 24 May 1941 by Royal Air Force bombing. She was raised by the Italians, repaired and returned to service. On 21 June 1943, on passage between Gaeta and Sardinia she was again attacked by British planes and sunk with a torpedo about 25 nautical miles (46 km) north-northeast of Capo Figari, Sardinia.

== See also ==
- USS Noma (SP-131), 1917–1919. Originally Steam Yacht Noma (1902)
