= Barry K. Atkins =

United States Navy admiral (1911–2005)

Barry Kennedy Atkins
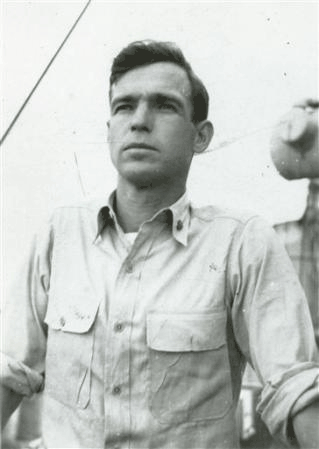
- Barry K. Atkins on the bridge of USS Melvin, 1945
- Born: August 2, 1911; Annapolis, Maryland, US
- Died: November 15, 2005 (aged 94); Richmond, Virginia, US
- Burial place: Arlington National Cemetery
- Military career
- Allegiance: United States of America
- Branch: United States Navy
- Service years: 1932–1959
- Rank: Rear Admiral
- Commands: Motor Torpedo Boat Squadron 8 USS Melvin (DD-680
- Conflicts: World War II
- Awards: Navy Cross; Silver Star; Bronze Star

Rear Admiral Barry Kennedy Atkins (August 2, 1911 – November 15, 2005) was an officer of the United States Navy best known for his achievements as a destroyer captain in World War II.

Atkins graduated from the United States Naval Academy in 1932, and was commissioned as a career naval officer.His early Naval career included assignment to the USS Tennessee, 1932–33; assignment to USS New Mexico, 1933–36; assignment to USS Mahan, 1936–38; assignment to the USS Cuyama, 1938–39; developing techniques for refueling at sea; assignment to the U.S. Naval Academy, 1939-41. Then LCDR Atkins was assigned to Motor Torpedo Boat Squadrons Training Center, Melville, Rhode Island, August, 1942; designation as commander of PT Squadron 8; PT boat operations around New Guinea, 1943-44. Following this assignment he commanded the destroyer USS Melvin in the Pacific Theater of World War II, and received the Navy Cross for "extraordinary heroism" for action during the Battle of Surigao Strait in the Philippines. On October 25, 1944, Melvin fired a torpedo at the Japanese battleship Fusō, setting off a chain reaction of explosions that sank the ship; according to Jack Green, spokesman at the Naval Historical Center, "the Melvin probably was the only destroyer to sink a battleship in World War II."

Atkins also served on USS Parrott, USS Tennessee, and USS New Mexico, among other ships, and was decorated with the Silver Star, Bronze Star, and other medals. He retired in October 1959.

Admiral Atkins died on November 15, 2005, at age 94. He was buried at Arlington National Cemetery, in Arlington, Virginia, on January 30, 2006.

There has been pressure from crewmen of Melvin to have a ship named after Atkins; the only official response has been that, as one prominent and highly decorated officer among many, he is eligible for the honor but not guaranteed it.
