= USS Melvin (DD-680) =

Fletcher-class destroyer

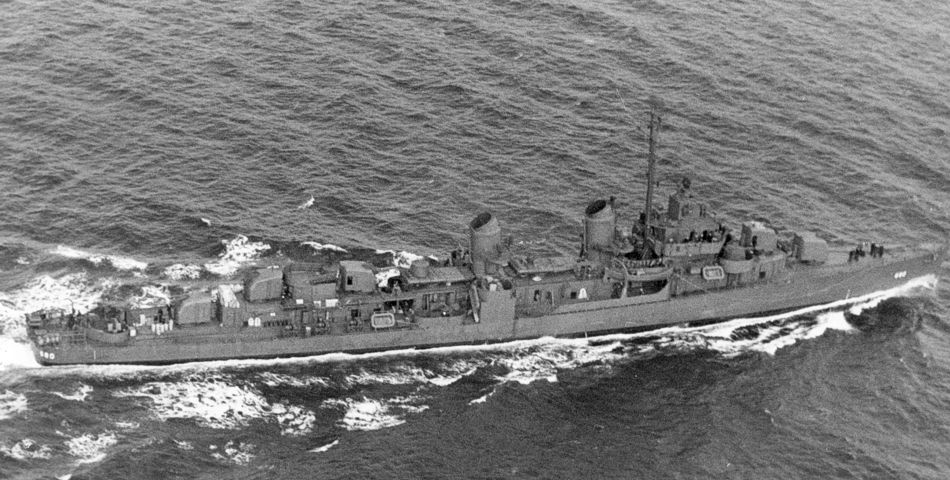
- USS Melvin (DD-680) underway, ca. 1943

History

United States
- Namesake: John T. Melvin
- Builder: Federal Shipbuilding & Dry Dock Company, Kearny, N.J.
- Laid down: 6 July 1943
- Launched: 17 October 1943
- Commissioned: 24 November 1943
- Decommissioned: 13 January 1954
- Stricken: 1 December 1974
- Nickname(s): the Blue Devil
- Fate: Sold for scrap 14 August 1975

General characteristics
- Class & type: Fletcher-class destroyer
- Displacement: 2,050 tons
- Length: 376 ft 6 in (114.7 m)
- Beam: 39 ft 9 in (12.1 m)
- Draft: 17 ft 9 in (5.4 m)
- Propulsion: 60,000 shp (45 MW); 2 propellers
- Speed: 38 knots (70 km/h; 44 mph)
- Range: 6,500 nm at 15 kn (12,000 km at 28 km/h)
- Complement: 273
- Armament: 5 × 5 in (130 mm)/38 cal (5x1), 10 × 40 mm guns (5x2), 7 × 20 mm guns (7x1), 10 × 21 inch (533 mm) torpedo tubes (2x5), 6 × depth charge projectors, 2 × depth charge tracks

USS Melvin (DD-680) was a Fletcher-class destroyer and the second ship of the United States Navy to be named for Lieutenant, junior grade John T. Melvin (1887–1917), who was killed on 5 November 1917 while serving on USS Alcedo in World War I and is recognized as the first American naval officer to die in that war.

Melvin was laid down on 6 July 1943 by Federal Shipbuilding & Dry Dock Company, in Kearny, N.J., launched on 17 October 1943, sponsored by Miss Gertrude C. Bailey, grandniece of Lieutenant Melvin and commissioned on 24 November 1943.

== Service history ==
=== 1944 ===
Following shakedown off Bermuda, Melvin sailed for the Pacific on 1 February 1944. Arriving Pearl Harbor on 4 March, she got underway for Majuro five days later and for the next month conducted antisubmarine patrols and participated in the blockade of the enemy-held atolls in the Marshall Islands. She returned to Pearl Harbor on 2 May and underwent fire support training, departing 31 May with Task Group 52.17 (TG 52.17) for Saipan. Approaching the island on the night of 13/14 June, she sank Japanese submarine Ro-36 with gunfire and depth charges at 15°21′N 147°00′E. A few hours later, while steaming off northern Saipan, she sank a Japanese merchantman. For the next 23 days, she provided counter-battery fire and conducted antisubmarine patrols, claiming damage to a submarine on the 17th, she, escorted ships from Eniwetok and participated in the bombardment of Tinian.

On 8 July, Melvin sailed for Eniwetok as part of the screen of the transports carrying troops to Guam, she then screened transports and oilers from 22 July to 7 August. After preparations at Guadalcanal, from 8–21 September she took part in the capture and occupation of the southern Palau Islands before joining TG 33.19 for the occupation of Ulithi. After escorting LSTs to Hollandia, she arrived at Manus Island to prepare for the invasion of Leyte, Philippines.

Now with TG 79.11, Melvin sailed on 11 October toward the Philippines, screening the landing craft to be used in the assault on Dulag. Soon after midnight on 20 October, she entered Leyte Gulf and took up her assigned station between Dinagat and Hibuson Islands, carrying out patrols for the next 4 days. In the early hours of the 25th, she joined in the torpedo attack by Destroyer Squadron 54 (DesRon 54), which opened the Battle of Surigao Strait. Assigned with Remey and McGowan to the Eastern Attack Group, Melvin began launching torpedoes soon after 0300, claiming hits on the Japanese battleship Fusō, which sank at about 0338. Other reports, including from one of Fusō's survivors, report the battleship rolling and sinking in about 40 minutes. Following their attack, the destroyers withdrew up the Dinagat coast to Hibuson, from where they witnessed the barrage from Admiral Jesse B. Oldendorf's battle line.

=== 1945 ===
Within 48 hours, Melvin was en route to Hollandia, and escorting resupply convoys to the Philippines into December, when she returned to the Solomon Islands to rehearse for the assault on Luzon. She stood out of Purvis Bay, Florida Island on 25 December, escorting transports to Manus and then on to Lingayen Gulf. She arrived with her charges on 11 January 1945 and provided illumination, naval gunfire support and screening. She covered the landings until the 15th.

From Luzon, Melvin sailed south to Leyte, then to the Carolines, screening the Fast Carrier Task Force (TF 38/58). Steaming north with that force on 10 February, Melvin guarded the carriers as their aircraft raided Honshū and then provided air cover during the Iwo Jima campaign. On the 21st, she aided Saratoga as she was attacked then escorted her to Eniwetok for repairs.

By mid-March, she had rejoined the fast carriers at Ulithi, sailing northwest with them on the 14th to prepare the way for the Okinawa campaign. For the next 61 days, Melvin remained at sea, guarding the carriers, providing fire support and on picket station. After a brief respite at Ulithi in mid-May, she returned to the Ryukyu Islands on the 24th for raids on enemy installations in those islands and on Kyūshū. Mid-June she was docked in San Pedro Bay, underway again on 1 July as the carriers steamed north for their last deployment against Japan. In the next month and a half, the force operating off the Japanese homeland, shelling and bombing industrial and military targets on Honshū and Hokkaidō.

Melvin remained with the aircraft carrier until 10 August, when she sailed north to join TF 92 in an anti-shipping sweep and bombardment of Paramushiro. With that mission completed on the 12th, she sailed east to Adak, Alaska, where she received word of the Japanese surrender and orders to return to Japan for occupation duty with minesweepers off northern Honshū. On 12 October, she departed for the United States, arriving at San Francisco on 4 November. At San Diego on 31 May 1946, she was decommissioned and joined the Pacific Reserve Fleet.

=== 1951-1954 ===
Melvin recommissioned on 26 February 1951 and sailed on 1 June for Newport, R.I. to join the Atlantic Fleet's DesRon 24, bolstering the 2nd and 6th Fleets so that they could spare destroyers for the U.N. effort in South Korea. For 2½ years, she cruised off the US east coast and in the Caribbean Sea, deploying to the Mediterranean Sea from 22 April to 8 October 1952 and 22 April to 6 June 1953.

On 13 January 1954, she decommissioned again and joined the Reserve Fleet at Charleston, South Carolina, remaining there until 1960, when she was reassigned to the Philadelphia Group, Atlantic Reserve Fleet.

Melvin was stricken from the Naval Vessel Register on 1 December 1974, sold on 14 August 1975 and broken up for scrap.

== Awards ==
Melvin received 10 battle stars for World War II service.
