= Daniel Augustus Joseph Sullivan =

United States Navy Reserve officer

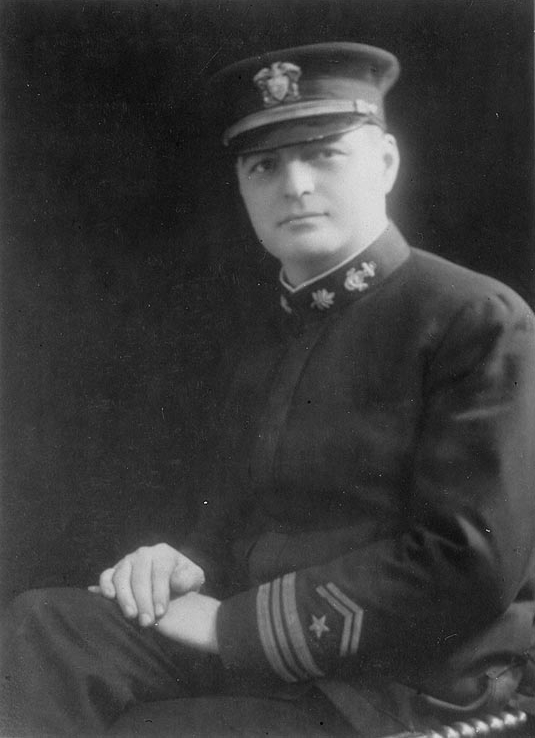
- Lieutenant Commander Daniel Sullivan
- Born: July 31, 1884; Charleston, South Carolina, US
- Died: January 27, 1941 (aged 56)
- Burial place: Arlington National Cemetery
- Military career
- Allegiance: United States
- Branch: United States Navy Reserve
- Service years: 1917 - 1920
- Rank: Lieutenant Commander
- Units: USS Christabel (SP-162); USS Drayton (DD-23); USS Ludlow (DD-112)
- Conflicts: World War I *Action of 21 May 1918
- Awards: Medal of Honor

Daniel Augustus Joseph Sullivan (July 31, 1884 – January 27, 1941) was a United States Naval Reserve officer and a recipient of the United States military's highest decoration—the Medal of Honor—for his actions in World War I.

== Biography ==
Sullivan attended Clemson College and graduated as part of the Class of 1902.

Sullivan enrolled in the United States Naval Reserve Force on April 12, 1917, a few days after the United States entered World War I. He later received a commission to the rank of Ensign. On May 21, 1918, while serving as an officer of the USS Christabel (SP-162), he secured several live depth charges that had come loose during combat with a German U-boat. For this act, he was awarded the Medal of Honor.

Later in 1918, Ensign Sullivan was assigned to the destroyers USS Drayton (DD-23) and USS Ludlow (DD-112). Promoted to Lieutenant in September 1918, he served with the U.S. Navy Headquarters in London, England, during the months following the November 1918 armistice. He attained the rank of Lieutenant Commander before leaving the Naval Reserve Force. Sullivan died at age 56 and was buried at Arlington National Cemetery, Arlington County, Virginia. He was survived by his wife, Eva Tilton (1877—1973).

== Medal of Honor citation ==
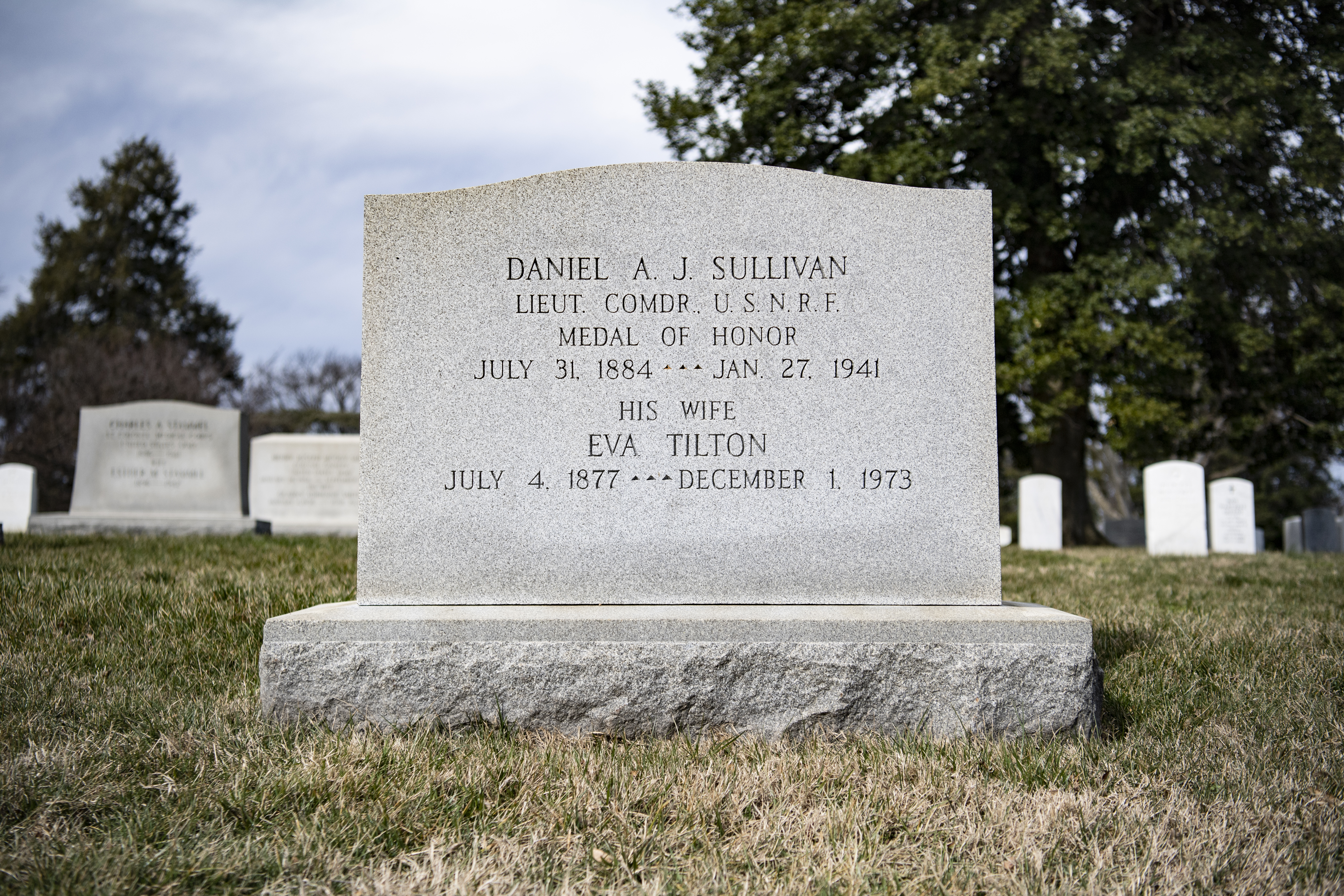
Grave at Arlington National Cemetery

Rank and organization: Ensign, U.S. Naval Reserve Force. Born: July 31, 1884, Charleston, S.C. Appointed from: South Carolina.

Citation:

For extraordinary heroism as an officer of the U.S.S. Cristabel in conflict with an enemy submarine on May 21, 1918. As a result of the explosion of a depth bomb dropped near the submarine, the Christabel was so badly shaken that a number of depth charges which had been set for firing were thrown about the deck and there was imminent danger that they would explode. Ens. Sullivan immediately fell on the depth charges and succeeded in securing them, thus saving the ship from disaster, which would inevitably have caused great loss of life.

== See also ==
- List of Medal of Honor recipients
- List of Medal of Honor recipients for World War I
