= USS Melvin (DD-335) =

Clemson-class destroyer

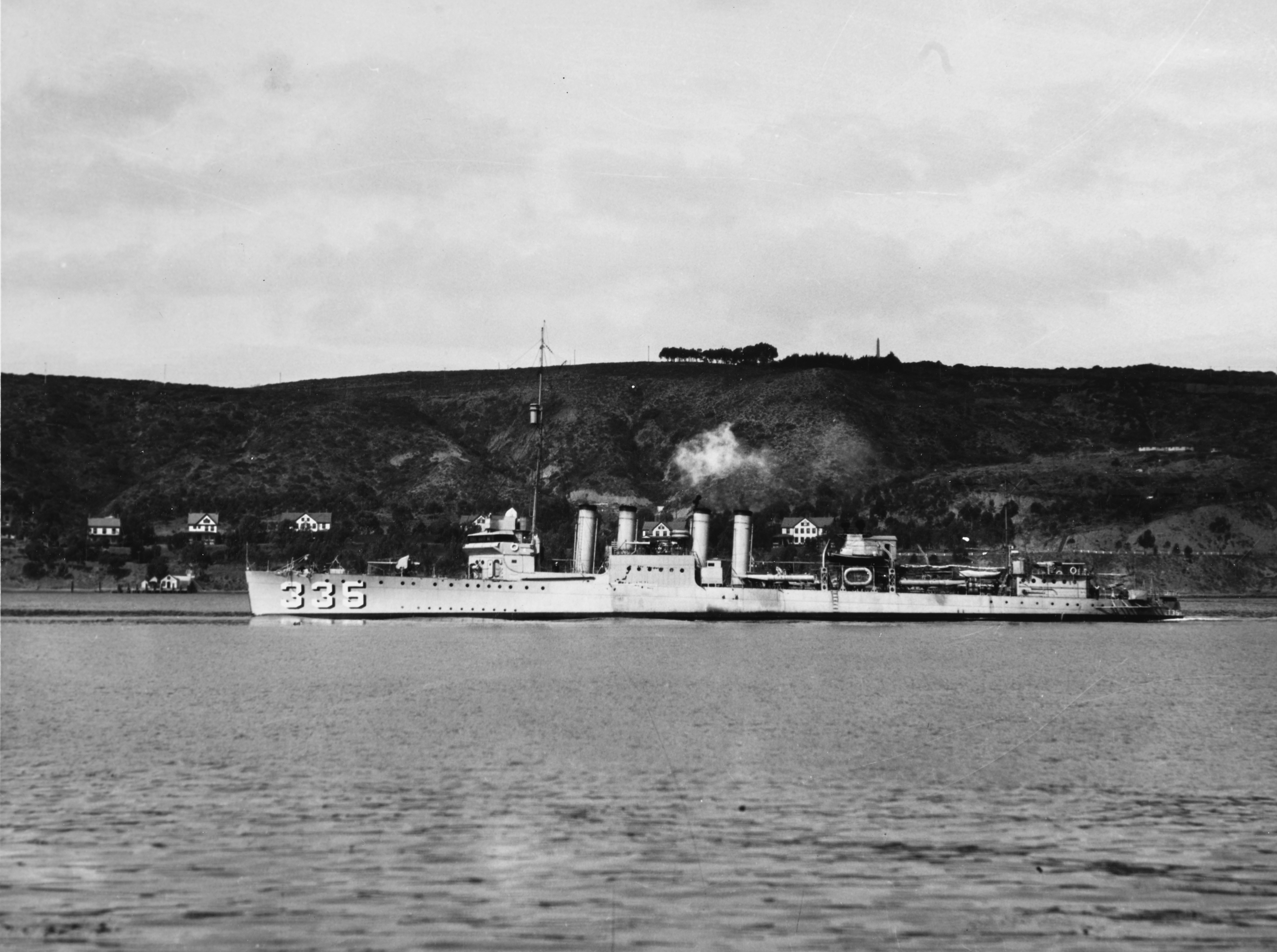

History

United States
- Namesake: John T. Melvin
- Builder: Bethlehem Shipbuilding Corporation, Union Iron Works, San Francisco
- Laid down: 15 September 1920
- Launched: 11 April 1921
- Commissioned: 31 May 1921
- Decommissioned: 8 May 1930
- Stricken: 3 November 1930
- Fate: Sold for scrap, 1930

General characteristics
- Class & type: Clemson-class destroyer
- Displacement: 1,290 long tons (1,311 t) (standard); 1,389 long tons (1,411 t) (deep load)
- Length: 314 ft 4 in (95.8 m)
- Beam: 30 ft 11 in (9.42 m)
- Draught: 10 ft 3 in (3.1 m)
- Installed power: 27,000 shp (20,000 kW); 4 water-tube boilers
- Propulsion: 2 shafts, 2 steam turbines
- Speed: 35 knots (65 km/h; 40 mph) (design)
- Range: 2,500 nautical miles (4,600 km; 2,900 mi) at 20 knots (37 km/h; 23 mph) (design)
- Complement: 6 officers, 108 enlisted men
- Armament: 4 × single 4-inch (102 mm) guns; 2 × single 1-pounder AA guns or; 2 × single 3-inch (76 mm) guns; 4 × triple 21 inch (533 mm) torpedo tubes; 2 × depth charge rails

USS Melvin (DD-335) was a Clemson-class destroyer in service with the United States Navy from 1921 to 1930. She was scrapped in 1931.

== Description ==
The Clemson class was a repeat of the preceding Wickes class although more fuel capacity was added. The ships displaced 1,290 long tons (1,311 t) at standard load and 1,389 long tons (1,411 t) at deep load. They had an overall length of 314 feet 4 inches (95.8 m), a beam of 30 feet 11 inches (9.4 m) and a draught of 10 feet 3 inches (3.1 m). They had a crew of 6 officers and 108 enlisted men.

Performance differed radically between the ships of the class, often due to poor workmanship. The Clemson class was powered by two steam turbines, each driving one propeller shaft, using steam provided by four water-tube boilers. The turbines were designed to produce a total of 27,000 shaft horsepower (20,000 kW) intended to reach a speed of 35 knots (65 km/h; 40 mph). The ships carried a maximum of 371 long tons (377 t) of fuel oil which was intended gave them a range of 2,500 nautical miles (4,600 km; 2,900 mi) at 20 knots (37 km/h; 23 mph).

The ships were armed with four 4-inch (102 mm) guns in single mounts and were fitted with two 1-pounder guns for anti-aircraft defense. In many ships a shortage of 1-pounders caused them to be replaced by 3-inch (76 mm) guns. Their primary weapon, though, was their torpedo battery of a dozen 21 inch (533 mm) torpedo tubes in four triple mounts. They also carried a pair of depth charge rails. A "Y-gun" depth charge thrower was added to many ships.

== Construction and career ==
Melvin, named for Lieutenant (junior grade) John T. Melvin, was laid down 15 September 1920 at the Union Plant, Bethlehem Shipbuilding Corporation, San Francisco, California; launched 11 April 1921; sponsored by Miss Laura L. McKinistry; and commissioned 31 May 1921. Following a brief shakedown, Melvin began operations off the west coast, which was to be her primary cruising area for her entire career, with a round-trip voyage to San Diego, California. During her 9 years in commission Melvin thrice transited the Panama Canal for Caribbean-based fleet problems, 1923, 1924, and 1927. Following such operations in the latter year, she cruised north to New York City and Newport, Rhode Island before sailing for Nicaragua. Arriving in the Bluefields area 25 June, she remained until 6 July to lend support, if needed, to marines then charged with supervising the establishment of the Nicaraguan Guardia Nacional and maintaining an uneasy truce. Exercises and type training in Hawaiian waters also interrupted her west coast operations and, subsequent to such maneuvers in the spring of 1925, she completed her only roundtrip cruise across the Pacific, a good will tour which took her to Samoa, Australia, and New Zealand.

On 17 July 1929, Melvin entered the Navy yard at Mare Island, San Francisco, to begin inactivation. On 7 October, in tow of Tern, she headed south on her last voyage to San Diego. Arriving on the 11th, she decommissioned 8 May 1930 and on the 10th was towed back to Mare Island for scrapping. Struck from the Naval Vessel Register 3 November 1930, her materials were sold in the course of the next 2 years.
