= USS Vedette (SP-163) =

Patrol vessel of the United States Navy

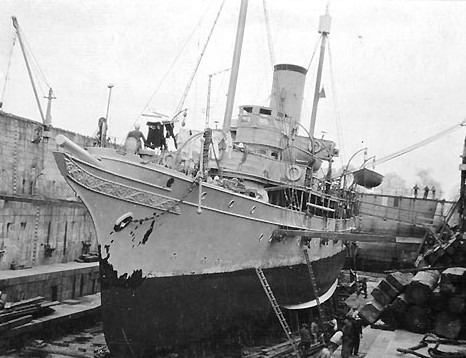
- USS Vedette (SP-163) in dry dock at L'Orient, France, circa 1917-1918.

History

United States
- Name: USS Vedette (SP-163)
- Builder: Bath Iron Works, Bath, Maine; Designed by G. L. Watson
- Launched: 23 December 1899
- Completed: 1899
- Acquired: 4 May 1917
- Commissioned: 28 May 1917
- Stricken: 4 February 1919
- Fate: Returned to owner 4 February 1919

General characteristics
- Type: yacht
- Displacement: 441 tons
- Length: 199 ft 6 in (60.81 m)
- Beam: 26 ft 0 in (7.92 m)
- Draft: 12 ft 0 in (3.66 m)
- Propulsion: Steam engine, single-screw
- Complement: 61
- Armament: Three 3” guns; Two Colt machine guns; Ten Sperry Mk-1 Naval mines
- Armour: steel-hulled

The first USS Vedette (SP-163) was a commercial yacht built in 1899. At the outbreak of World War I, the yacht was leased by the United States Navy, and was used as a section patrol craft in the North Atlantic Ocean. She served honorably during the war, rescuing survivors at sea, and attacking a German U-boat. At war's end, she was converted to her original configuration and returned to her owner, the railroad executive, financier, and philanthropist Frederick W. Vanderbilt (1856–1938) of New York City.

== Built in Bath, Maine ==
Virginia - a steel-hulled, single-screw steam yacht designed by G. L. Watson and built at Bath, Maine, by Bath Iron Works for New York City merchant Isaac Stern — was delivered on 23 December 1899. In 1916, the yacht was acquired by the Frederick W. Vanderbilt and renamed Vedette.

== Acquired by the U.S. Navy ==
The Navy acquired the ship from Vanderbilt on a free-lease basis on 4 May 1917. Earmarked for convoy escort and patrol duty overseas, Vedette was assigned the section patrol number SP-163 and was commissioned at the New York Navy Yard in Brooklyn, New York, on 28 May 1917.

== World War I service ==
=== Sailing for France ===
Vedette and five other patrol vessels - all former yachts - got underway from Tompkinsville on Staten Island, New York, bound for Bermuda on 9 June 1917 on the first leg of their voyage to France. USS Sultana (SP-134) and USS Christabel (SP-162) were the first to weigh anchor; USS Harvard (SP-209), USS Kanawha (SP-130), USS Noma (SP-131), and Vedette followed. The ships formed up into divisions, with Vedette leading the second group.

On the evening of the 12 June 1917, they anchored in St. George's harbor at Bermuda. They remained in Bermuda for a little over three days, coaling ship and taking on water. The vessels got underway again on the morning of 16 June 1917 and reached the Azores on 25 June 1917.

=== Witnessing the debris of war ===
After coaling and taking on water and provisions in the Azores, Vedette and her consorts began their passage to Brest, France. En route, they soon encountered abundant evidence that they were entering a war zone. Vedette spotted "considerable floating wreckage and a cork life belt" upon which no name was visible on the evening of 2 July 1917. The next morning, she spotted more of the same: boxes, barrels, a broken life-belt, and pieces of planking from an anonymous ship or ships — mute evidence of a sinking.

The squadron sighted the French coast at 0440 on 4 July 1917, but before they could make it into port, Christabel broke down and Vedette stood by until she could get underway again. Later, as the ships made their way toward Brest, a French torpedo boat came out and greeted the American force. The six patrol vessels were among the first ships of the United States Navy to reach French waters in World War I.

Over the next 10 days, Vedette prepared for the operations that lay ahead. She finally put to sea, in company with Harvard, on the morning of 16 July 1917.

=== Assigned to convoy patrol duty ===
Her first patrol pretty much set the standard theme for the many that followed. The two ships initially headed for the middle of the patrol line 10 nautical miles (18.5 kilometers) off the coast, extending from the northward and westward of Ushant to the southward of Belle Île. Vedette patrolled the southern half of the line while Harvard prowled the northern.

Vedette returned to Brest on 19 July 1917, without having met the enemy, but she did encounter more wreckage, including life rings from an unidentified ship. She twice more patrolled the area between Brest and Ushant, near Belle Isle, before the end of July 1917.

Vedette remained in port the first few days of August 1917, and she suffered slight damage on the morning of 3 August 1917 when Christabel - while shifting moorings — raked her stern, carrying away the flagstaff and damaging the after rail. Nevertheless, Vedette stood out to sea at 1700 that afternoon in the screen of an outward-bound convoy of 10 merchant ships which were also protected by Harvard, three French patrol vessels, and two British ships.

Vedette left that convoy at 0050 on 4 August 1917 and patrolled the vicinity until 0650, when she picked up a Brest-bound convoy of 19 merchantmen escorted by three patrol boats. Vedette anchored at Brest at 1025 the same day, but her respite was short. Less than six hours later, she stood out with a convoy of 16 merchantmen, three French patrol boats, and Harvard.

Vedette left that convoy when it passed out of the coastal danger zone and waited to pick up a Brest-bound convoy at 1655 on 5 August 1917. While en route in, Harvard broke down, and Vedette stood by until her longstanding partner was ready to proceed.

=== Friendly fire ===
Still en route to Brest during the pre-dawn hours of 6 August 1917, Vedette sighted a "suspicious vessel" at 0320 and opened fire with her number two 3-inch (76.2-mm) gun. The shot fell well forward of the stranger, who soon signaled that she was a French patrol boat. Vedette's first shot of the war had been aimed at a "friendly" ship.

Vedette was docked at Brest shortly after noon that day for alterations. After the work was completed during the forenoon watch (0800–1200) on 7 August 1917, the ship was towed back to her former berth, where she provisioned and made ready to return to the Ushant-Brest patrol line.

=== Convoy ship strikes a mine ===
Vedette escorted an outward-bound convoy late on 9 August 1917, and an inward-bound one on 10 August 1917, before she and Harvard were assigned to another outward-bound group of 10 merchantmen and two French patrol vessels. At 2010, Vedette's watch heard an explosion astern, accompanied by several blasts of a ship's whistle. A British merchantman, last in line of the convoy, had struck a naval mine; nearby, a French vessel rescued 14 men before the rapidly sinking ship disappeared. Twelve men had died in the explosion.

After delivering the convoy to Quiberon Bay, Vedette anchored at 0645, but that evening again got underway — with a convoy of eight merchantmen, two French patrol vessels, and Harvard—and arrived back at Brest with that group at noon on the following day. On the morning of 15 August 1917, Vedette was underway again and conducted convoy escort operations through the next day.

=== Rescuing crew members of torpedoed ship ===
At 0650 on 17 August 1917, the Greek steamship SS Pontoporos—bound from Tyne Dock to Spezia with a cargo of 4,600 tons of coal and 2,000 tons of coke — was hit by a torpedo on the starboard beam. It exploded eight feet (2.4 m) below the waterline, abreast the engine room, and tore up the decking topside.

Vedette rang up full speed ahead and stood about, hunting for the submarine. Unable to make contact with the enemy, the yacht picked up 27 men from a lifeboat, including the master of Pontoporos, a Captain Panas, at 0715. Two more men were transferred from a French fishing boat five minutes later. Vedette soon cast the lifeboat adrift at 0725 and circled the sinking ship; at 0740, Pontoporos sank from sight. After Vedette reached Port Heliguen later that morning, she turned the 29 survivors over to French authorities.

Vedette continued the same routine of operations — interspersed with periods of upkeep, maintenance, and provisioning — through the remainder of the summer and autumn of 1917 and into 1918. On 20 January 1918, Lieutenant Commander Hand was relieved as commanding officer by Lieutenant Charles Alan Pownall (1887–1975), a future rear admiral who would command aircraft carrier task force during World War II and later serve as governor of Guam.

=== Updating anti-submarine weapons ===
By January 1918, the ship's armament reflected the multi-national character of the escort work performed out of Brest, for not only did she carry her original allotment of 10 American Sperry Mk. I "Mines", but also eight French Guirand charges and three British Type "D" ones. By the summer of 1918, that had again changed, and the ship carried, by that point, 21 American Mark 2 depth charges.

=== Vedette goes to general quarters ===
Vedette's routine changed little in 1918. Her only encounter with the enemy, however, came on 5 August 1918.

Underway from Quiberon Bay at 0435 that day, she was steaming at the head of a convoy of 11 ships; other escorts were Harvard, the patrol vessel USS Remlik (SP-157), and the torpedo boat Stewart (Coast Torpedo Vessel No. 13). At 0802, the convoy passed Point de Chats abeam to port, distance three nautical miles (5.6 kilometers); at 0812, the ships changed course so that by 0835, they were off Pen Men, abeam to port at a distance of two and one-half nautical miles (4.6 kilometers). At 0924, Vedette's watch felt a slight jar; within a minute, they saw that the merchant ship SS Hundvaago had taken a torpedo and was sinking rapidly.

Vedette went to full speed ahead and sprang to general quarters. At 0927, Signalman 3rd Class Nye, Chief Quartermaster Teiper, and the officer of the deck saw a submarine off the starboard quarter of the convoy. Vedette heeled as the helm was put over at hard right rudder and she raced toward the enemy. She sounded five short blasts on her whistle, but a merchant ship obstructed her view of the submarine, and the periscope disappeared. Vedette immediately commenced a search, circling and trying to locate the enemy submersible.

At 0935, Vedette received orders from Harvard and, in company with Stewart, quickly proceeded to reform the panic-stricken convoy. Within 20 minutes, Hundvaago had sunk, another U-boat victim. An hour before noon, Vedette resumed her position at the head of the convoy and, 45 minutes later, took station on the port flank of the convoy.

Things were not quiet for long, however. At one minute past noon, a French seaplane, attracted to the scene of the torpedoing, dropped a smoke bomb, indicating the presence of what looked like a submarine. Vedette again went to general quarters and put over hard right rudder as she sped off to the hunt. She soon picked up a small oil wake about 200 yards (180 m) east of the smoke bomb and dropped a barrage of eight depth charges at 1215. Ten minutes later, having seen "no further evidence of a submarine," Vedette rejoined the convoy, taking station on the port bow.

Stewart later dropped four depth charges over a 15-minute period but failed to learn whether or not she had tangled with a submarine. She nevertheless continued the hunt, in company with Vedette, Harvard, and Remlick, while the newly arrived destroyer Tucker (Destroyer No. 57) joined the convoy's screen.

=== Rescuing a downed French plane ===
However, Vedette's work for that day was not complete until she had assisted a downed French seaplane from the French Naval Air Service. At 1718, another French plane had dropped a message requesting aid in Baie de Douarnenez. A bit under an hour later, Vedette lowered her motorboat, which that took the pilots aboard and took the disabled plane in tow. When Vedette reached her destination, she lowered a whaleboat which took up the tow and safely delivered the French plane.

=== End-of-war-operations ===
Vedette would never again have that much excitement in a single day. Thereafter, her duties for the remainder of the war were placid as she continued to escort convoys to and from Brest and patrolled offshore in between convoy runs. Less than a month after the Armistice with Germany stilled the guns of World War I on 11 November 1918, she departed Brest for the last time when she weighed anchor on 6 December 1918 for the long voyage home.

Steaming in company with the patrol vessels USS Emeline (SP-175), USS Corona (SP-813), USS Nokomis (SP-609), and Sultana, Vedette arrived at Ponta Delgada at 1025 on 11 December 1918. She coaled ship there, took on provisions, and brought aboard 133 bags of coal to store on deck for the transatlantic voyage. Underway at 0702 on 15 December 1918, the squadron anchored in St. George's harbor, Bermuda, on the morning of 24 December 1918. It got underway again on 25 December 1918 on the last leg of its voyage.

Shortly after leaving Bermuda, Emeline, Nokomis, and Corona steamed off "on duty assigned," leaving Vedette alone with Sultana—one of her companions on her voyage to Europe in the summer of 1917. The two patrol vessels entered New York Harbor on the afternoon of 28 December 1918, home at last.

== Decommissioning and disposal ==
At 0900 on 30 December 1918, Vedette moved up the East River to the New York Navy Yard in Brooklyn. By noon, her trio of 3-inch (76.2-mm) guns, her machine guns, and small arms had been removed.

On 4 February 1919, at Tebo's Yacht Basin, Vedette was returned to Frederick W. Vanderbilt. She was stricken from the Navy List the same day.
