= John Melvin (naval officer) =

Lieutenant (junior grade) John T. Melvin (16 October 1887 – 5 November 1917) was an officer in the United States Navy.

Born at Selma, Alabama, Melvin was appointed midshipman 6 July 1907 and commissioned ensign 7 July 1911. Resigning his commission 20 August 1915, he was appointed lieutenant (jg.), 9 February 1917, upon his joining the Naval Reserve.

Attached to the patrol boat Alcedo, Lieutenant (jg.) Melvin lost his life 5 November 1917 when that vessel was sunk by a German submarine in the war zone. Alcedo was the first American war vessel to go down in World War I, and Lieutenant Melvin is officially recognized as the first American naval officer to die in the war.

Two destroyers have been named USS Melvin for him.
