= USS Sultana =

Patrol vessel of the United States Navy

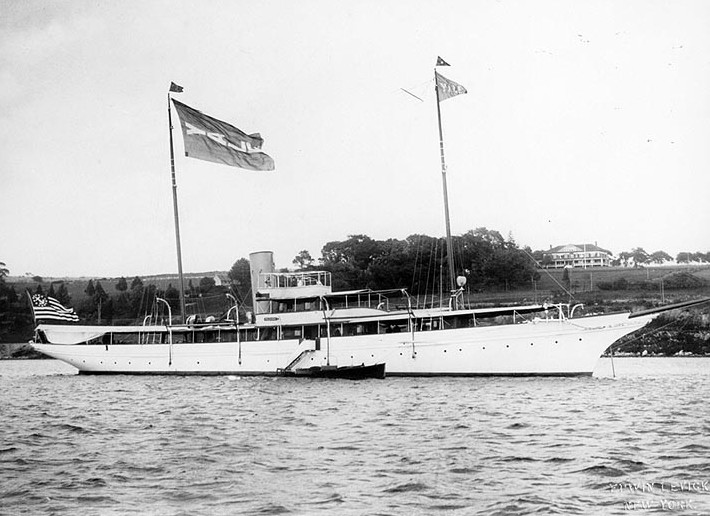
- Sultana before World War I

History

United States
- Name: USS Sultana
- Owner: 1890: Trenor Luther Park; 1895: John R. Drexel; 1906: Executors of J.M. Sears; 1907: Edward E. Harriman; 1910: Executors of E.E. Harriman; 1912: Mrs Edward Harriman; 1921: Paul E. DeFere; 1924: F.B. Dunn; 1929: John P. Mills; 1934: J.Q. Tabor
- Port of registry: 1890: New York; 1924: Los Angeles
- Builder: Handren and Robins, Erie Basin, New York
- Christened: as Sultana
- Completed: 1889
- Acquired: 4 May 1917 by the United States Navy under a free lease
- Commissioned: 27 May 1917
- Decommissioned: circa 17 February 1919
- Renamed: Retained original name
- Stricken: 17 February 1919
- Identification: US official number 116332; code letters KHFV; 1917: pennant number SP-134
- Fate: wrecked 1937

General characteristics
- Type: steam yacht
- Tonnage: 390 GRT, 230 NRT
- Length: 186 ft (57 m) overall; 169.0 ft (51.5 m) registered
- Beam: 27.6 ft (8.4 m)
- Draft: 13 ft (4.0 m)
- Depth: 17.5 ft (5.3 m)
- Installed power: 53 NHP
- Propulsion: 1 × triple-expansion engine; 1 × screw
- Sail plan: schooner
- Speed: 12 knots (22 km/h)
- Complement: 62
- Armament: 4 × 3-inch (76 mm) guns; 2 × machine guns

USS Sultana (SP-134) was a steam yacht acquired under a free lease by the United States Navy in World War I. She was outfitted as a patrol boat and was assigned to escort duty in the North Atlantic Ocean. She rescued survivors adrift in the water, and protected cargo ships from U-boat attack, and was returned to her owner at the close of the war.

== Built in Erie Basin, New York ==
Sultana was built in 1889 by Handren and Robins at Erie Basin, New York. Its registered length was 169.0 ft (51.5 m), its beam was 27.6 ft (8.4 m), and its depth was 17.5 ft (5.3 m). Its tonnages were 390 GRT and 230 NRT. It had a single screw, driven by a three-cylinder triple-expansion engine that was rated at 53 NHP. It also had sailing masts, and was rigged as a schooner. It was registered at New York. Its US official number was 116332, and its code letters were KHFV.

It was commissioned for Trenor Luther Park and his wife Julia Hunt Catlin, of New York City. They spent their honeymoon on it and crossed the Atlantic "about 75 times" as quoted from her memoires. "We cruised from the Windward Isles to South America. One time we cruised for a year and a half from the North Cape to the Suez, stopping wherever and for as long as we pleased." Trenor L. Park was a Harvard graduate, silk merchant and prominent yachtsman. By 1895 had John R. Drexel bought the yacht. J.M. Sears acquired it about 1905, but died soon after. Edward E. Harriman acquired it in 1907, but died in 1909, leaving Sultana to his widow Mrs Edward Harriman.

== World War I service ==
=== Assigned to the North Atlantic Ocean ===
On 4 May 1917, Mrs. Harriman loaned the steam yacht to the United States Navy under a free lease. Sultana was commissioned on 27 May 1917. It was fitted out at Brooklyn Navy Yard, and she joined a special patrol force at Tompkinsville, Staten Island, on 6 June. The force sailed for France on 9 June. On 4 July, she rescued 45 survivors of the American merchantman, Orleans, which had been torpedoed the day before; and she landed them at Brest, France, that evening.

From 4 July 1917 to 5 December 1918, Sultana was attached to the US Patrol Squadron based at Brest and performed escort and patrol duty. On 5 December, after the war had ended, she headed for home via the Azores and Bermuda, and arrived at New York on 28 December 1918.

== Post-war decommissioning and disposal ==
Sultana was stripped of her naval hardware, decommissioned, and on 17 February 1919 was struck from the Navy list and returned to Mrs Harriman. By 1921 Paul E. DeFere had acquired the yacht. By 1924, F.B. Dunn had acquired it, and registered it in Los Angeles. John P. Mills had acquired it by 1929, and J.Q. Tabor had acquired it by 1934. In 1937 it was recorded as "wrecked", and deleted from Lloyd's Registry of Yachts.

== See also ==
- USS Vedette (SP-163)

== Bibliography ==
- Lloyd's Register of Yachts. London: Lloyd's Register of Shipping. 1890 – via Internet Archive.
- Lloyd's Register of Yachts. London: Lloyd's Register of Shipping. 1895 – via Internet Archive.
- Lloyd's Register of Yachts. London: Lloyd's Register of Shipping. 1906 – via Internet Archive.
- Lloyd's Register of Yachts. London: Lloyd's Register of Shipping. 1907 – via Internet Archive.
- Lloyd's Register of Yachts. London: Lloyd's Register of Shipping. 1910 – via Internet Archive.
- Lloyd's Register of Yachts. London: Lloyd's Register of Shipping. 1912 – via Internet Archive.
- Lloyd's Register of Yachts. London: Lloyd's Register of Shipping. 1921 – via Internet Archive.
- Lloyd's Register of Yachts. London: Lloyd's Register of Shipping. 1924 – via Internet Archive.
- Lloyd's Register of Yachts. London: Lloyd's Register of Shipping. 1929 – via Internet Archive.
- Lloyd's Register of Yachts. London: Lloyd's Register of Shipping. 1934 – via Internet Archive.
- Lloyd's Register of Yachts. London: Lloyd's Register of Shipping. 1937 – via Internet Archive.
