= USS Christabel =

Patrol vessel of the United States Navy

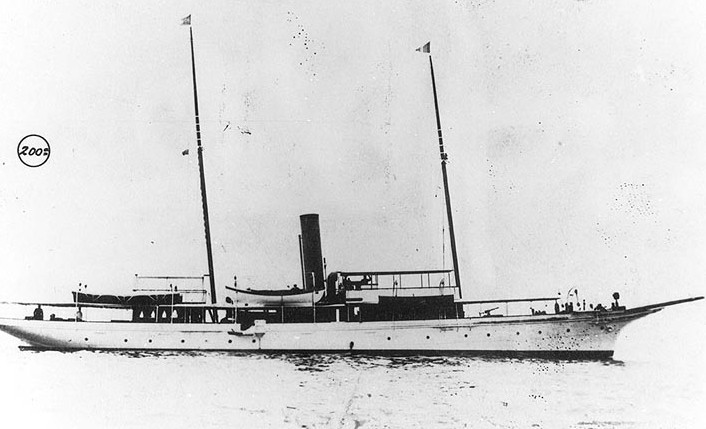
- Christabel before World War I

History
- Name: Christabel
- Owner: 1893: Arthur Kennard, Falkirk; by 1910: Walton Ferguson; by 1917: Irving T. Bush
- Port of registry: 1893: (United Kingdom) Glasgow; by 1910: (United States) New York
- Builder: D&W Henderson, Glasgow
- Yard number: 370
- Launched: 10 August 1893
- Acquired: 30 April 1917
- Commissioned: May 1917
- Decommissioned: 19 May 1919
- Stricken: circa 19 May 1919
- Home port: 1917: Brest, France; 1918: New London, Connecticut
- Identification: pennant number SP-162
- Honors and awards: Daniel Augustus Joseph Sullivan was awarded the Medal of Honor for securing live depth charges that had come loose during combat with a German U-boat.
- Fate: Sold 30 June 1919

General characteristics
- Type: steam yacht
- Tonnage: 248 GRT, 103 NRT
- Length: 150.0 ft (45.7 m)
- Beam: 22.0 ft (6.7 m)
- Draft: 9 ft 8 in (2.95 m)
- Depth: 12.5 ft (3.8 m)
- Installed power: 53 NHP
- Propulsion: triple expansion engine
- Speed: 12 knots (22 km/h)
- Complement: in US Navy: 55 officers and enlisted men
- Armament: two 3-inch (76 mm) guns
- Armor: steel hull

USS Christabel (SP-162) was a civilian steam yacht that was built in Glasgow in 1893 for a Scottish industrialist. She had an American owner by 1910, served as a United States Navy patrol ship in the latter part of the First World War, and afterward was returned to US civilian service.

The US Navy bought her in 1917, had her fitted out as a warship, and used her on patrol duty in the North Atlantic. She served with honor as a section patrol craft, surviving an attack on a German U-boat. After the war she was briefly a training ship, before being decommissioned and sold in 1919.

== Building and civilian service ==
D and W Henderson built Christabel in its Meadowside shipyard in Glasgow, Scotland. She was yard number 370, and was launched on 10 August 1893.

Her registered length was 150.0 ft (45.7 m), her beam was 22.0 ft (6.7 m) and her depth was 12.5 ft (3.8 m). Her tonnages were 248 GRT and 103 NRT. She had a three-cylinder triple expansion steam engine that was rated at 53 NHP.

Christabel's first owner was Arthur Kennard of the Falkirk Iron Works, who registered her in Glasgow. By 1910 her owner was Walton Ferguson and she was registered in New York. By 1917 her owner was Irving T. Bush.

== World War I naval service ==
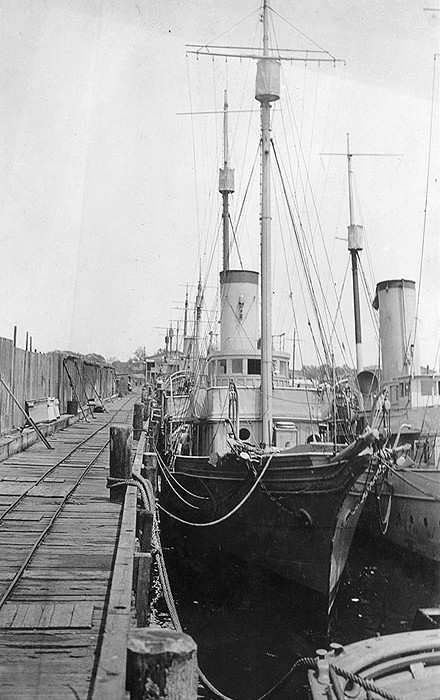
USS Christabel in port

The US Navy bought Christabel from Bush on 30 April 1917, commissioned her at New York Navy Yard 31 May 1917 and assigned her to US Patrol Squadrons Operating in European Waters.

She was fitted out as a warship and placed in commission a month later. Her main armament was two heavy 3-inch (76 mm) guns. On 9 June 1917 she left New York City to cross the Atlantic, and early in July she reached Brest, France.

For the remainder of the war Christabel served on escort and patrol duty off western France, and took part in at least two actions against German U-boats. One of these was the action of 21 May 1918 when she was credited with sinking a U-boat off Spain. However, later it was found that the U-boat was only damaged but had to be interned by Spain a few days later.

== Training ship ==
After returning to the United States in December 1918, she was based at New London, Connecticut, and served with reserve anti-submarine squadrons as an anti-submarine training ship.

== Awards and honors ==
As an officer on board the Christabel, Ensign Daniel Augustus Joseph Sullivan was awarded the Medal of Honor for exhibiting "extraordinary heroism" in securing live depth charges that had come loose during combat with a German U-boat on 21 May 1918. Officer of the Deck Lieutenant JG Howard Rutherford Shaw was awarded the Navy Cross for "promptly heading for the submarine with the intent to ram, with the result that it was possible to drop depth charges at the right time and place, damaging the submarine so severely that she was obliged to intern at Santander, Spain, for the remainder of the war."

== Decommissioning ==
Christabel was decommissioned 19 May 1919 and sold on 30 June to the Savannah Bar Pilots Association, of Savannah, Georgia.

== See also ==
- USS Vedette (SP-163)
- Action of 21 May 1918
