= USS Kanawha II =

United States Navy patrol vessel

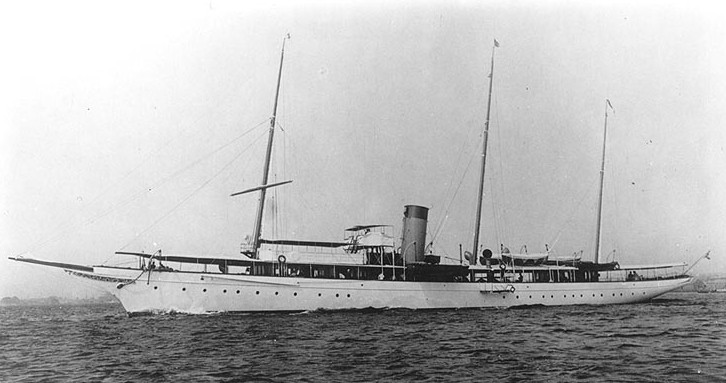
- Kanawha in civilian service, before World War I

History

United States
- Name: 1917: Kanawha; 1918: Piqua
- Namesake: 1917: Kanawha River; 1918: Piqua, Ohio
- Owner: John Borden
- Operator: United States Navy
- Port of registry: Chicago
- Builder: Gas Engine & Power Co, and Charles L Seabury & Co, Morris Heights
- Launched: 27 May 1899
- Completed: 28 July 1899
- Acquired: 28 April 1917
- Commissioned: 28 April 1917
- Decommissioned: 1 July 1919
- Renamed: 1 March 1918
- Stricken: 1919
- Identification: pennant number SP-130; Navy code letters GSKM; by 1918: wireless call sign NND
- Fate: returned to civilian ownership, 1 July 1919

General characteristics
- Type: armed yacht
- Tonnage: 475 GRT, 323 NRT
- Displacement: 575 tons
- Length: 227 ft (69 m) overall; 208.4 ft (63.5 m) registered
- Beam: 24.4 ft (7.4 m)
- Draught: 9 ft 8 in (2.95 m) (mean)
- Depth: 14.8 ft (4.5 m)
- Installed power: 172 NHP, 3,200 ihp
- Propulsion: 2 × triple-expansion engines; 2 × screws
- Speed: 20 knots (37 km/h)
- Complement: 65
- Armament: 4 × 3-inch (76 mm) guns; 1 × 6-pounder gun; 2 × machine guns

USS Kanawha II (SP-130), later called USS Piqua (SP-130), was a steam yacht that was built in 1899, and which the United States Navy used as an armed yacht in the First World War. She was commissioned in 1917 as Kanawha II, with the "II" added probably to distinguish her from the oiler USS Kanawha (AO-1). She was renamed Piqua in 1918, probably for the same reason.

The yacht was built in 1899 for a member of the New York Yacht Club (NYYC) who wanted a steam yacht for racing. The Navy classified her as a patrol vessel, but she was faster than the U-boats of her era, which enabled her to serve as a submarine chaser. The Navy returned her to civilian ownership in July 1919.

== Description ==
The Gas Engine & Power Company and Charles L. Seabury and Company of Morris Heights in the Bronx built Kanawha. She was launched on May 27, 1899.

Her registered length was 208.4 ft (63.5 m), her beam was 24.4 ft (7.4 m), and her depth was 14.8 ft (4.5 m). Her tonnages were 475 GRT and 323 NRT. She had twin screws, each driven by a three-cylinder triple-expansion engine. The combined power of her twin engines was rated at 172 NHP or 3,200 ihp, and gave her a speed of 20 knots (37 km/h).

From 1899 until at least 1907, Kanawha proved her speed in a number of races. These included official events organised by the NYYC, and unofficial races against the New Jersey Central Railroad's fast steamers between Atlantic Highlands, New Jersey and New York City. By 1915 or 1916 her owner was a John Borden.

== Naval service ==
On April 28, 1917, the Navy acquired Kanawha from Borden, and commissioned her as USS Kanawha II. The Navy changed her code letters to GSKM, and gave her the pennant number SP-130.

She was the second steam yacht called Kanawha that the Navy had commissioned for war service. Her predecessor was built in 1896, and had been commissioned in 1898 to serve in the Spanish–American War.

Borden was a lieutenant commander in the United States Navy Reserve, so the Navy appointed him to command his own yacht. She spent her first three weeks of naval service in the New York area. She was fitted out for service overseas, and armed with four 3-inch (76 mm) guns; one 6-pounder gun; and two machine guns.

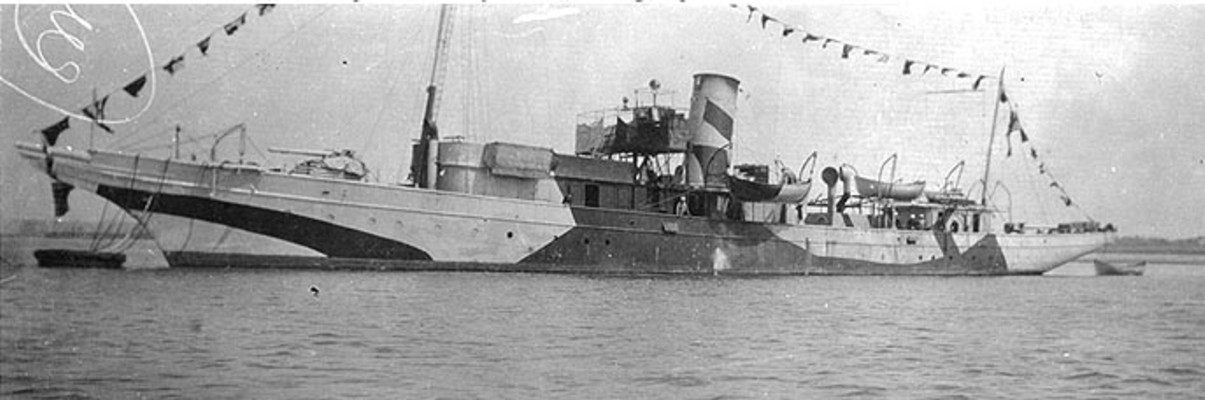
USS Piqua (SP-130) dressed overall on July 4, 1918, as flagship of the US District Commander at Lorient, France

On June 9 she left for Europe, and on July 4 she reached Brest, France, in the vanguard of a flotilla of ships that the US sent to European waters. A fortnight later she began patrol off Brest. On September 3 she sighted her first periscope, but was unable to press an attack. On November 28 she sighted a periscope closing in on a convoy, and issued a submarine warning. Two other patrol vessels tracked the U-boat and sank it with depth charges, while the convoy continued undamaged.

On March 1, 1918, Kanawha II was renamed Piqua. She kept the same pennant number SP-130. Also by 1918, she was equipped with wireless telegraphy. Her call sign was NND.

On July 6, 1918, Piqua was escorting a convoy when she sighted a U-boat conning tower, on a course almost parallel with that of the convoy. She closed in, and at 11,000 yards (10,000 m) she opened fire. Her gun crew was unable to see the target, so her bridge took bearings and estimated the range, and directed the gun laying. She scored no hits, but succeeded in driving the U-boat away.

Piqua continued to operate off the French coast until after the Armistice of 11 November 1918. On May 20, 1919, she left France for New York. She called at the Azores and Bermuda, and then anchored off Tompkinsville, Staten Island. She then moved to Morris Heights, and on July 1, 1919, she was returned to civilian ownership.

== See also ==
- USS Vedette (SP-163)

== Bibliography ==
- Lloyd's Register of Yachts. London: Lloyd's Register of Shipping. 1905 – via Internet Archive.
- The Marconi Press Agency Ltd (1918). The Year Book of Wireless Telegraphy and Telephony. London: The Wireless Press, Ltd.
- United States Department of Commerce (1908). Thirty-Fifth Annual List of Merchant Vessels of the United States. Washington, DC: Government Printing Office – via Internet Archive.
- United States Department of Commerce (1916). Forty-Eighth Annual List of Merchant Vessels of the United States. Washington, DC: Government Printing Office – via HathiTrust.
