= Eastern Yacht Club =

Yacht club in Massachusetts

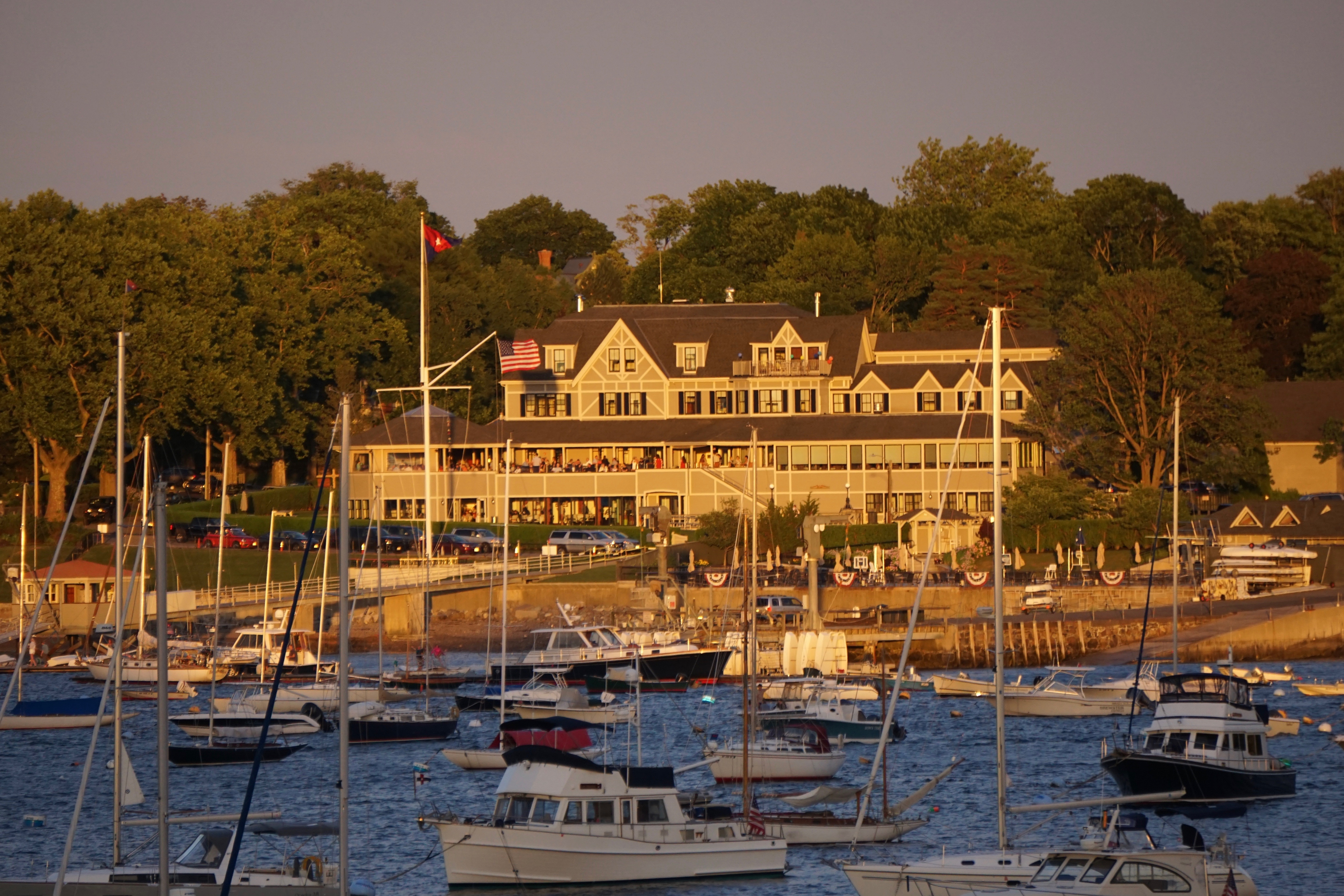
- Eastern Yacht Club in 2018
- Formation: 1870
- Location: Marblehead, Massachusetts
- Website: easternyc.org

The Eastern Yacht Club is located in Marblehead, Massachusetts and founded in 1870. It is one of the oldest yacht clubs on the east coast with significant involvement in the history of American yachting.

== History ==
Eastern Yacht Club circa 1880s

Eastern Yacht Club c. 1906 with later additions

President Wilson presenting Club Cup to owner of Yacht Ellen who won race off of Marblehead, Mass

The current clubhouse was constructed in 1880. The first meeting of the club was at Mr. John Heard's house in Boston on March 5, 1870. A club house location committee was led by B.W. Crowninshield, and a site on Marblehead neck was purchased. A new structure was built and officially opened on June 9, 1881.

== The Eastern Club House 1881 ==
Construction began in 1880, and was designed in the popular stick style. Inside features a model room, with full and half hull models of member yachts through the years. Later additions are wing and a tower, staff and guest overnight rooms, a main dining room and bar. and would expand the complex to include tennis courts and a swimming pool. The club suffered a few fires over years losing the right tower tower portion.

== Notable races ==
- One Design Racing
- Marblehead Race Week
- Team Racing
- Pursuit Racing

== Notable Affiliated yachts & Members ==
Eastern Yacht Club Notable Yachts
| Name | Owner | Notes |
|---|---|---|
| Rebecca | Commodore Charles H. Joy | |
| Puritan | John Malcolm Forbes | America's Cup defender 1885 |
| Mayflower | General Charles J. Paine | America's Cup defender 1886 |
| Volunteer | General Charles Paine | America's Cup defender 1887 |
| Cleopatras Barge II | Francis B Crowninshield | |
| Constellation | Commodore Herbert Sears | nickname "Queen of the Eastern" |

=== Other Notable Members ===
- Charles Francis Adams
- Edward Burgess
- Starling Burgess
- Chandler Hovey
- Bradley Noyes
- Ray Hunt
- L. Francis Herreshoff
- Ted Hood

== World War I contributions ==
=== Training Station ===
When the United States entered the war, Commodore Herbert Sears called the Under Secretary of the Navy, Franklin Roosevelt, and offered the use of the Eastern clubhouse to the Navy as a base. Roosevelt accepted and the clubhouse was used as a training station for the final year of World War I, primarily for training ashore and aviation training.

=== Naval Patrol Boats: "The Eastern Yacht Club 62 footers" ===
A group of 14 members wanting to contribute to the war effort, ordered and personally financed boats to be used by the Navy as patrol craft and built with Navy approval of the design. Known as "The Eastern Yacht Club 62 footers", the boats were designed by Albert Loring Swasey and Nathanael Greene Herreshoff.

The nine nearly identical motor boats built by the Herreshoff Manufacturing Company in Bristol, Rhode Island.The boats bore names under construction chosen by the owners and were then given their Section Patrol numbers once accepted by the Navy. The Eastern Yacht Club boats with sponsors were:

- USS Apache (SP-729) — Robert F. Herrick
- USS Ellen (SP-1209) — Charles P. Curtis
- USS Inca (SP-1212) — Frank B. McQuesten
- USS Kangaroo (SP-1284) — Henry A. Morss, Charles A. Morss, Everett Morss
- USS Daiquiri (SP-1285) — Charles F. Ayer, Osborne Howes, Frank S. Eaton, Oliver Ames
- USS Snark (SP-1291) — Carl H. Tucker
- USS Commodore (SP-1425) — Flag officers of the Eastern Yacht Club, Herbert M. Sears, Max Agassiz, J. S. Lawrence
- USS Sea Hawk (SP-2365) — Arthur Winslow, Edwin S. Webster, Charles A. Stone

Plus one built to the design independently:

- USS War Bug (SP-1795) — Felix Warburg
