= USS Apache (SP-729) =

Patrol vessel of the United States Navy

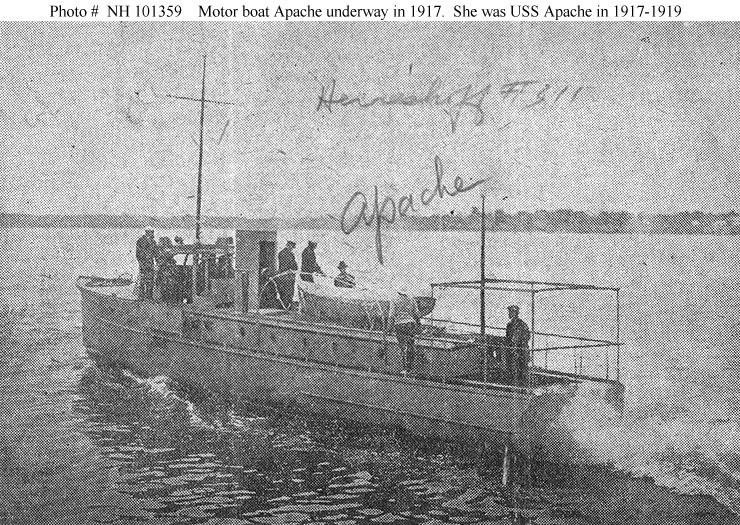
- Apache as a civilian motorboat in 1917, prior to her acquisition by the United States Navy.

History

United States
- Name: Apache (1917, pre Navy); SP-729 (1917–1919 USN); Arrow (1919–1923 USCG); AB-2 (1923–1925 unnamed harbor launch)
- Namesake: The Apache, the collective term for several culturally related groups of Native Americans originally from the American Southwest (previous name retained)
- Builder: Herreshoff Manufacturing Company, Bristol, Rhode Island
- Completed: 12 June 1917
- Acquired: 23 May 1917
- Commissioned: 7 July 1917 – 17 May 1919
- Stricken: 17 May 1919
- Fate: Transferred to United States Shipping Boardfor disposal 18 March 1925

General characteristics
- Type: Section Patrol
- Displacement: 12 tons
- Length: 62 ft 4 in (19.00 m) overall; 61 ft 4 in (18.7 m) on water line
- Beam: 10 ft 11 in (3.33 m)
- Draft: 2 ft 6 in (0.76 m) mean (Navy)
- Installed power: 2 X 8 cyl, 200 hp Sterling engines
- Propulsion: 2 X 24 in (61.0 cm) propellers
- Speed: 21 kn (24 mph; 39 km/h)
- Range: 220 nmi (250 mi; 410 km)
- Complement: 8
- Armament: 1 × 1-pounder gun

USS Apache (SP-729) was the first to be delivered of eight motor boats built by Herreshoff Manufacturing Company at Bristol, Rhode Island ordered and financed by members of the Eastern Yacht Club of Marblehead, Massachusetts. The boats were designed by Albert Loring Swasey and Nathanael Greene Herreshoff with the intention that the boats be used by the Navy as patrol craft and built with Navy approval of the design. Apache, as were the other boats, bore names under construction chosen by the owners and were then given the Section Patrol numbers on Navy acceptance and activation. The names were dropped after a period and all the boats then bore only the S.P. numbers.

Apache was financed and ordered by Robert F. Herrick, a Harvard graduate and also Harvard's rowing coach, who had previously sold his smaller Gypsy to the Navy. The boat operated in Boston's 1st Naval District Section Patrol as a patrol and dispatch boat after being accepted by the Navy. The boat, along with several of the other Herreshoff/Eastern Yacht Club boats, were designated for shipment to France but the order was apparently cancelled due to the end of the war.

After the war the boat was sent south to Florida finally in Key West where the boat was decommissioned and transferred to the United States Coast Guard on 22 November 1919 and on 16 December renamed Arrow. The boat was towed to Tampa where it was reclassified to harbor launch and given the designation AB-2 without a name. The launch was found unfit for service and turned over to the United States Shipping Board for disposal 18 March 1925.

== Construction and design ==
Apache was among eight motor boats that were financed by members of the Eastern Yacht Club of Marblehead, Massachusetts to be built by the Herreshoff Manufacturing Company at Bristol, Rhode Island, to a design by Albert Loring Swasey and Nathanael Greene Herreshoff that had been approved by the Navy with the intention the boats be used as patrol craft in event of war. The boat was contracted on 10 March 1917, built for Robert F. Herrick of Boston as Herreshoff No. 311 and was the first of the eight to be completed.

The single design for all eight boats, termed the "62 footers" in popular reference, was for a wooden hull 62 ft 4 in (19.0 m) in overall length, 61 ft 4 in (18.7 m) on water line, 10 ft 11 in (3.3 m) breadth, with a mean draft of 3 ft 6 in (1.1 m)(Herreschoff) or 2 ft 6 in (0.8 m) (Navy). Navy gives displacement as 12 tons. Propulsion was by two 200 horsepower, eight cylinder Sterling gasoline engines driving two 24 in (61.0 cm) propellers. The contract speed was for 24.5 mph (21.3 kn; 39.4 km/h) with Apache over a measured mile course making better than 25 mph (22 kn; 40 km/h). The Navy rated the boat at 21 kn (24 mph; 39 km/h). The boat had a raised foredeck with spaces accessible through the conning tower or from the side decks. The remainder of the boat has a cabin with a small cockpit at the stern. A unique design feature was a dummy stack, unnecessary on a gasoline powered boat, that was actually an access to the engine compartment. That access is seen with the aft facing door open in the photograph of USS War Bug (SP-1795). The Navy gave fuel capacity as 500 US gallons (1,900 L) for a range of 220 nmi (250 mi; 410 km).

== Navy service ==
The U.S. Navy acquired Apache from Herrick on 23 May 1917 before the scheduled completion date of 12 June 1917 and launch on 13 June 1917. She was commissioned as USS Apache (SP-729), third Navy ship of that name, at Boston on 7 July 1917.

=== World War I ===
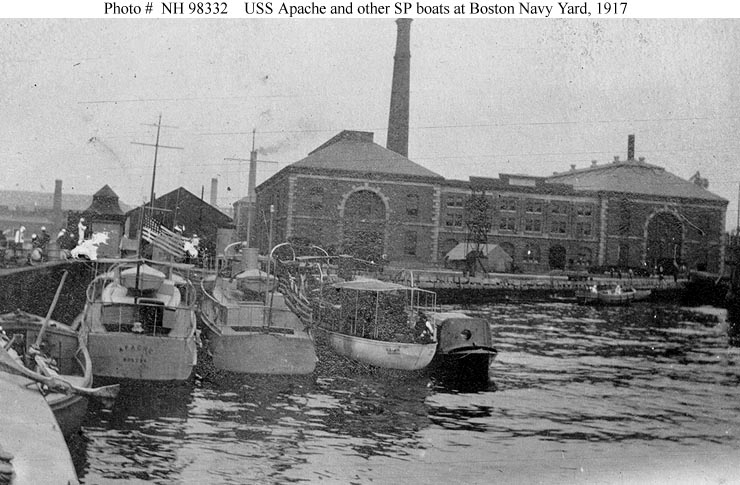
USS Apache is at left in this row of section patrol boats at the Boston Navy Yard, Boston, Massachusetts, probably soon after her commissioning.

Apache served as a dispatch boat and local patrol boat at Boston, operating under the aegis of the 1st Naval District, through early October 1918, by which time her name had been changed to USS SP-729.

Due to an urgent need for craft such as SP-729 at Brest, France, an order dated 14 October 1918 went out from Washington, D.C., to Boston, directing the Commandant of the 1st Naval District to ready six section patrol boats – USS Commodore (SP-1425), USS Cossack (SP-695), USS War Bug (SP-1795), USS Sea Hawk (SP-2365), USS Kangaroo (SP-1284), and SP-729—to be shipped to France as deck cargo along with spare parts to keep them operational. However, this proposed movement appears to have been cancelled, probably because of the armistice with Germany of 11 November 1918 that ended World War I and eliminated the need for more U.S. Navy patrol craft in Europe.

=== Postwar ===
Instead, SP-729 headed south via the inland waterway in December 1918, bound for Naval Air Station Pensacola at Pensacola, Florida, probably for duty as a crash boat. SP-729 was decommissioned at Key West, Florida, Florida, and stricken from the Navy List on 17 May 1919. She was turned over to the United States Coast Guard on 22 November 1919.

== United States Coast Guard service ==
The Coast Guard renamed the boat Arrow on 16 December 1919 and she was commissioned into the Coast Guard as USCGC Arrow at Key West on 25 August 1921. Soon thereafter the Coast Guard cutter Tallapoosa (WPG-52) towed Arrow to Tampa, Florida. While Arrow was serving at Tampa, she was reclassified as a harbor launch and designated as the unnamed harbor launch AB-2 on 6 November 1923. AB-2 later was found unfit for further Coast Guard service and was transferred to the United States Shipping Board on 18 March 1925 for disposal.

== The Eastern Yacht Club 62 footers ==
The Eastern Yacht Club boats with sponsors were:

USS Apache (SP-729) — Robert F. Herrick

USS Ellen (SP-1209) — Charles P. Curtis

USS Inca (SP-1212) — Frank B. McQuesten

USS Kangaroo (SP-1284) — Henry A. Morss, Charles A. Morss, Everett Morss

USS Daiquiri (SP-1285) — Charles F. Ayer, Osborne Howes, Frank S. Eaton, Oliver Ames

USS Snark (SP-1291) — Carll H. Tucker

USS Commodore (SP-1425) — Flag officers of the Eastern Yacht Club, Herbert M. Sears, Max Agassiz, J. S. Lawrence

USS Sea Hawk (SP-2365) — Arthur Winslow, Edwin S. Webster, Charles A. Stone

Plus one built to the design independently:

USS War Bug (SP-1795) — Felix Warburg
