= Herbert M. Sears =

American yachtsman and businessman

Herbert Mason Sears
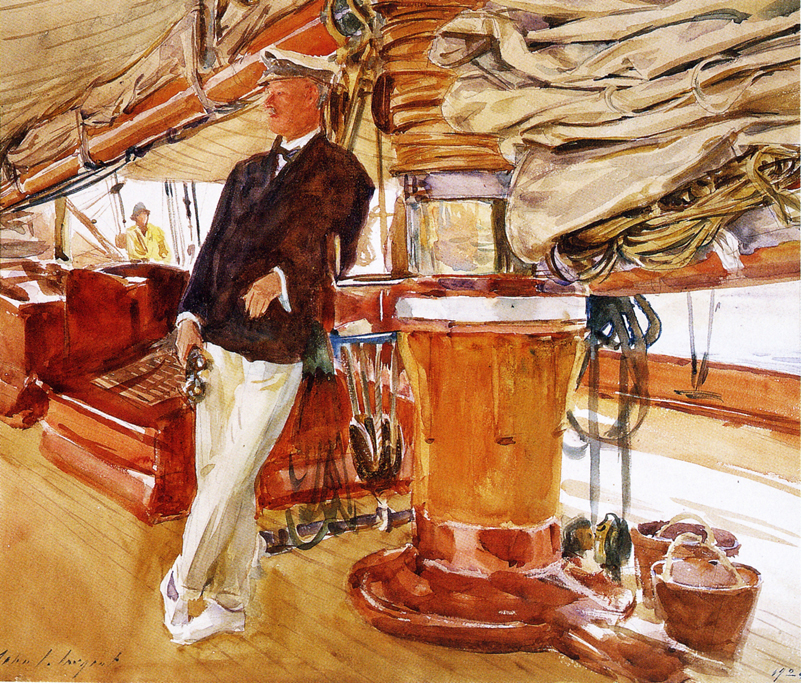
- On the Deck of the Yacht Constellation, portrait of Sears by John Singer Sargent
- Born: November 12, 1867; Boston, Massachusetts, US
- Died: February 19, 1942 (aged 74); Boston, Massachusetts US
- Burial place: Mount Auburn Cemetery
- Education: Harvard University
- Occupations: Commodore and yachtsman
- Organization: Eastern Yacht Club
- Known for: Constellation
- Spouse: Caroline Bartlett (m. 1891, d. 1908)
- Children: 2
- Family: Philip Sears and Richard Sears, brothers
- Honours: Croix de Guerre; Medal of French Gratitude

Herbert Mason Sears (November 12, 1867 – February 19, 1942) was an American yachtsman and businessman in Boston, Massachusetts. He was the commodore of the Eastern Yacht Club and owner of numerous yachts, including the Constellation.

Sears was awarded the Croix de Guerre and the Medal of French Gratitude for his work with the American Red Cross during World War I.

== Early life ==
Sears was born on November 12, 1867, in Boston, Massachusetts. He was from a prominent New England family, a Mayflower descendant of the Sawyer family line His parents were Alberta Homer (née Shelton) and Fredrick Richard Sears. His paternal grandfather was David Sears, the developer of Longwood. His twin brother was sculptor Phillip Sears and his older brother was professional tennis player Richard Sears.

He graduated from Harvard University in 1889. While there, he was a member of Delta Kappa Epsilon, aka The Dickey Club.

From 1888 to 1891, he served with the First Corps Cadets.

== Career ==
Sears worked for Lee, Higginson & Co. in Boston from 1890 to 1895. He was a partner with Curtis & Motley stockbrokers in Boston from 1896 to 1900. Sears left Curtis & Motley and managed estates. His banking and brokerage offices were at 53 State Street in New York City.

He was the president of the Fifty Associates real estate firm. He was also the vice president and trustee of Suffolk Savings Bank, a director of the Boston and Albany Railroad, and a director and executive committee members of the New England Trust Company. Sears was a board member and trustee of the Free Hospital for Women in Brookline, Massachustts. By 1908, Sears was worth around $4,000,000 ($139,659,259 in 2024 money).

Steam yacht Augusta

Constellation off Marblehead, MA

== Yachtsman ==
Sears was an avid yachtsman and commodore of the Eastern Yacht Club in Marblehead, Massachusetts from 1914 to 1923, and continued to be a life-long prominent member. He owned the steam yacht Augusta, and had the sloop Alert built in 1902, which was designed by Nathanael Greene Herreshoff.

Sears' pride was the schooner yacht Constellation, designed by Edward Burgess and originally built for Edwin D. Morgan. Sears purchased it in 1914. Constellation served as the flagship of the Eastern Yacht Club, leading the fleet in all club races and regattas, and was known as the "Queen of the Eastern". Constellation set many records. During World War II, Sears donated Constellation to the government so that it could be scrapped for its iron.Constellation's wheel and transom were save and presented to the yacht club.

In 1921, Sears created the Sears Cup as a sailing competition for juniors from Massachusetts yacht clubs. The geographic scope for the Sears Cup gradually expanded. Today, the Sears Cup is presented by US Sailing as its national championship for three-person youth teams.

Yachts owned by Herbert Sears
Name	Built	Type	Yard	Designer	Notes	Ref.
Augusta	1887	Steam yacht	Herreshoff Company, Bristol, Rhode Island	Nathanael Greene Herreshoff	built for John Brown Francis Herreshoff	
Hazard	1897	Gaff sloop	Herreshoff Company Bristol, Rhode Island	Nathanael Greene Herreshoff	built for Sears	
Alert	1902	Sloop	Herreshoff Company Bristol, Rhode Island	Nathanael Greene Herreshoff	built for Sears	
Joker	1903	Sloop Double Rig	Herreshoff Company Bristol, Rhode Island	Nathanael Greene Herreshoff	built for Sears	
Skidoo	1906	Gaff sloop	Herreshoff Company Bristol, Rhode Island	Nathanael Greene Herreshoff	built for Sears	
Constellation	1889	Schooner	Piepgras Shipyard, City Island, New York	Edward Burgess	built for Edwin D. Morgan	
Stella II	1926	S-Class Marblehead	Herreshoff Company Bristol, Rhode Island	Nathanael Greene Herreshoff	built for Sears	
Cricket		Sloop yacht				
Cristabel						
Eel	1901					
Hope		Steam yacht				
Mingo		Sonder				
Nanita		Steam yacht				

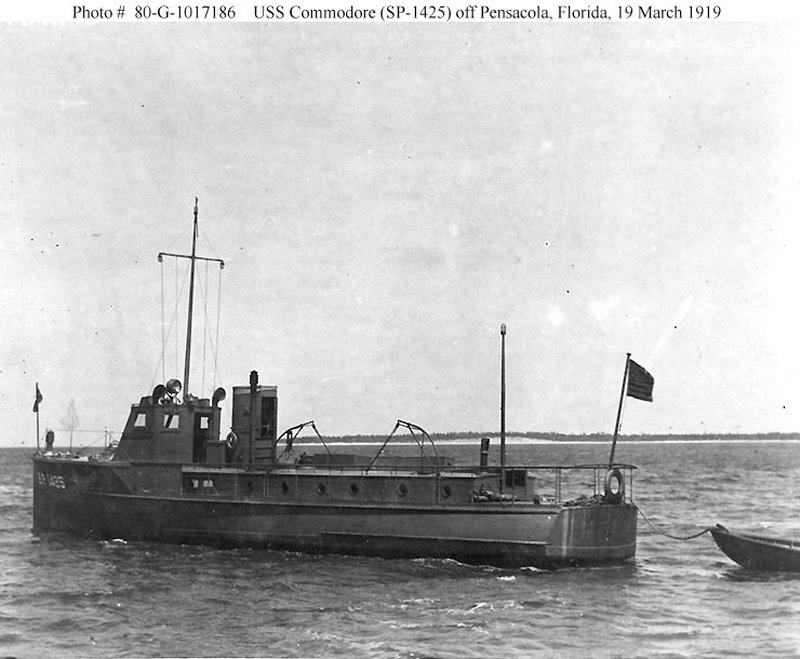
USS Commodore

== World War I ==
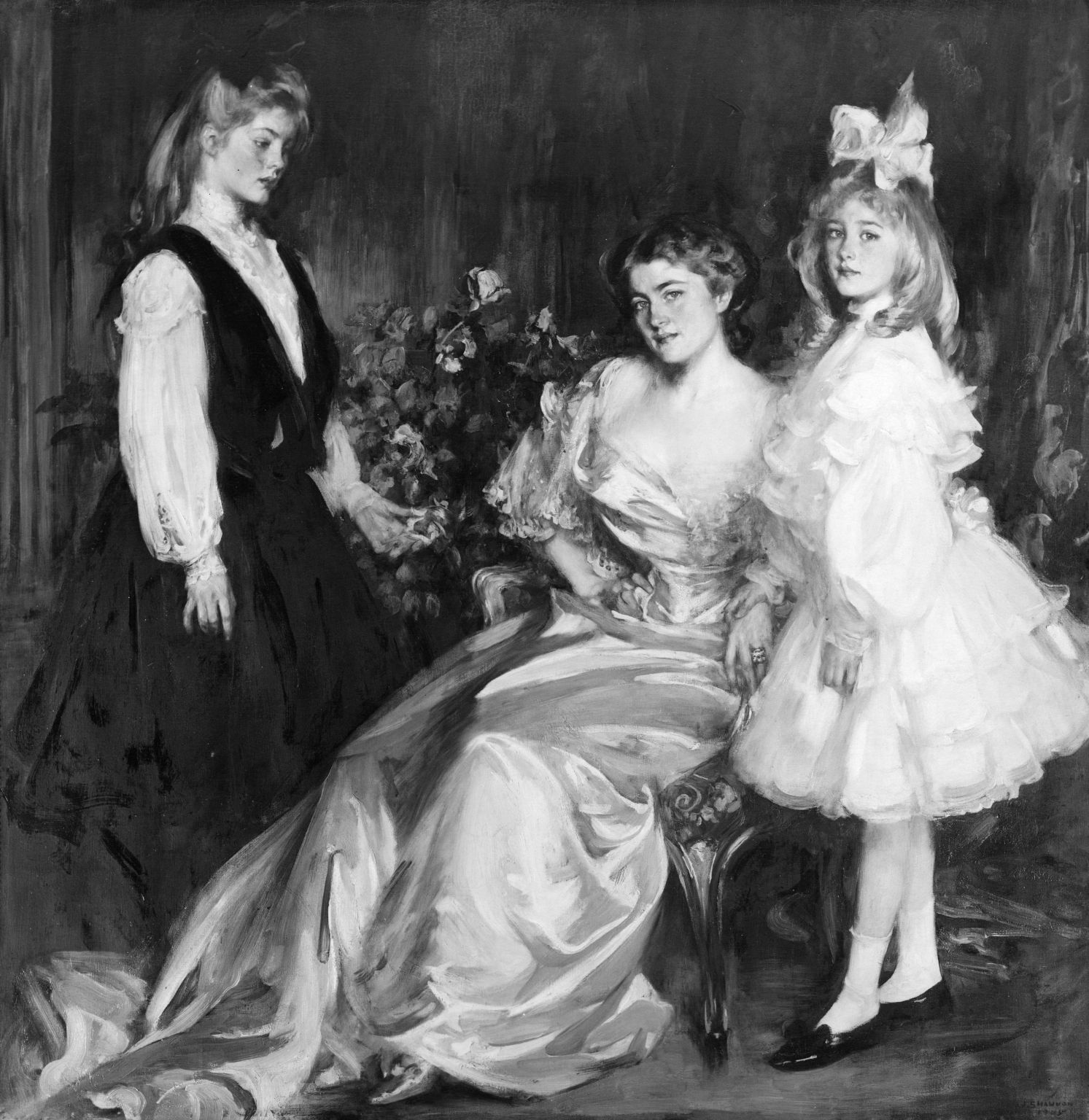
Portrait of Caroline Bartlett Sears and her daughters Elizabeth (left) and Phyllis (right), by James Jebusa Shannon, 1905

287 Commonwealth Avenue, Boston

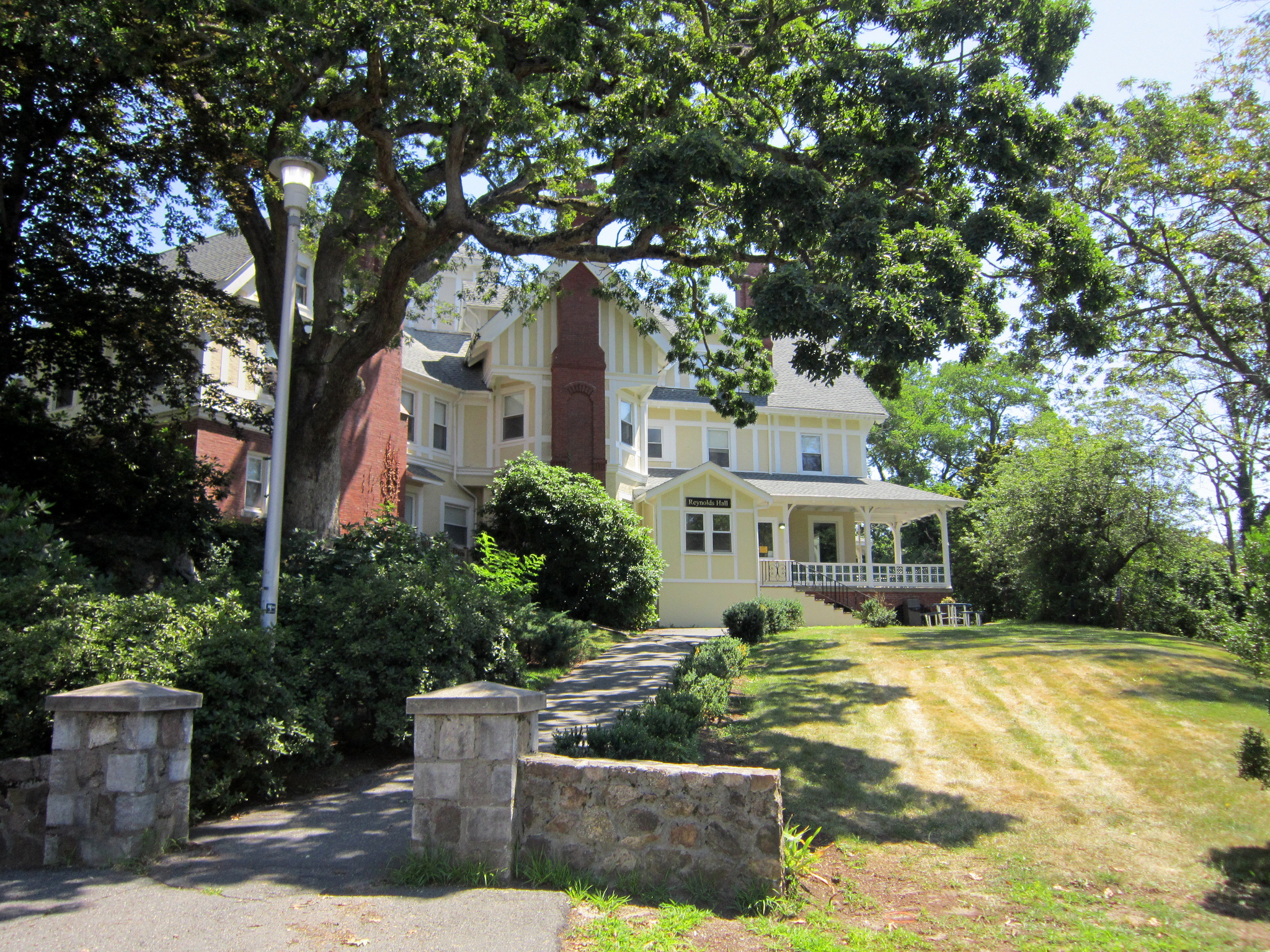
Woodrock, now Reynolds Hall, in Beverly, Massachusetts

When the United States entered World War I, Sears was Commodore of the Eastern Yacht Club. He called the United States Under Secretary of the Navy, Franklin Roosevelt, and offered the use of the Eastern clubhouse to the United States Navy as a base. Roosevelt accepted, and the clubhouse was used as a training station for the first year of the war, primarily for ashore and aviation training.

Sears, along with other members of the Eastern Yacht Club, sponsored and privately financed the construction of Navy patrol boats for the war effort known as "The Eastern Yacht Club 62 footers". The boats were designed by Albert Loring Swasey and Nathanael Greene Herreshoff. Sears paid for a patrol boat named the USS Commodore (SP-1425).

In 1917, at the age of 50, Sears volunteered and spent eight months at the front in France near Dixmude, serving as part of the American Red Cross. He was in charge of France's first American Red Cross canteen at the front. For his efforts, he received the Croix de Guerre and the Medal of French Gratitude.

After returning from France, his wrote of his experience in the book Journal of a Canteen Worker: A Record of Service with the American Red Cross.

== Personal life ==
Sears married Caroline Bartlett (1870–1908) in 1891. Her father was Francis Bartlett, a New York City lawyer noted for donating $1,000,000 worth of antiques to the Boston Museum of Fine Arts in 1903. The couple had two daughters, Elizabeth and Phyllis.

Caroline, who had melancholia, committed suicide by jumping from a window of the thirteenth floor of the St. Regis Hotel in New York City in 1908. Their daughters jointly inherited six million from their mother and $500,000 each and a trust fund from Francis Bartlett, becoming two of the wealthiest women in New England. Phyllis married Bayard Tuckerman Jr., a horseman and one of the founders of Suffolk Downs racetrack in East Boston. Their son, and Sear's grandson, was the politician Herbert Sears Tuckerman.

The Sears family's primary Boston residence was on 287 Commonwealth Avenue, designed by the architecture firm Rotch and Tilden. Sears had the house constructed in 1892, and continued to live there until his death. Sears also owned an estate named Woodrock in Beverly, Massachusetts at 400 Hale Street, Prides Crossing, purchased around 1896 from Martin Brimmer. Sears sold Woodrock the 1920s; it is now part of Endicott College and is called Reynolds Hall.

Sears was painted in 1924 by John Singer Sargent in On the Deck of the Yacht Constellation. The painting now resides in the collection of the Peabody Essex Museum. In addition to the Eastern Yacht Club, he belonged to the Boston Athletic Association, Knickerbocker Club, the New York Yacht Club, the Somerset Club, and the Tennis and Racquet Club.

Sears died at his home in Boston on February 19, 1941, at the age of 74. He was buried in the Mount Auburn Cemetery.
