= Constellation (schooner) =

American sailing ship

- Yacht Constellation circa 1892

History

United States
- Name: Constellation
- Builder: Piepgras Shipyard, City Island, New York
- Laid down: February 1, 1889
- Launched: June 20, 1889
- In service: August 1889
- Out of service: September 1941
- Fate: Scrapped 1941 (for War Effort)

General characteristics
- Type: Schooner
- Length: 136 ft (41 m) overall; 107 ft (33 m) at waterline
- Beam: 24 ft 9 in (7.54 m)

Constellation was the largest steel schooner when completed, having been designed by the yacht designer Edward Burgess and launched in 1889. She was built at the Piepgras Shipyard on City Island in the Town of Pelham on Long Island, New York. It was built for yachtsman Edwin D. Morgan III, who was a commodore of the New York Yacht Club, and grandson of New York Governor and state senator Edwin D. Morgan. The vessel remained in service on the United States East Coast at Marblehead, Massachusetts, until 1941 when the schooner was taken out of service and scrapped for its metal to aid the war effort.

== Design ==
Constellation being constructed alongside Tomahawk at Piepgras Shipyard

Constellation being fitting out at Piepgras yard

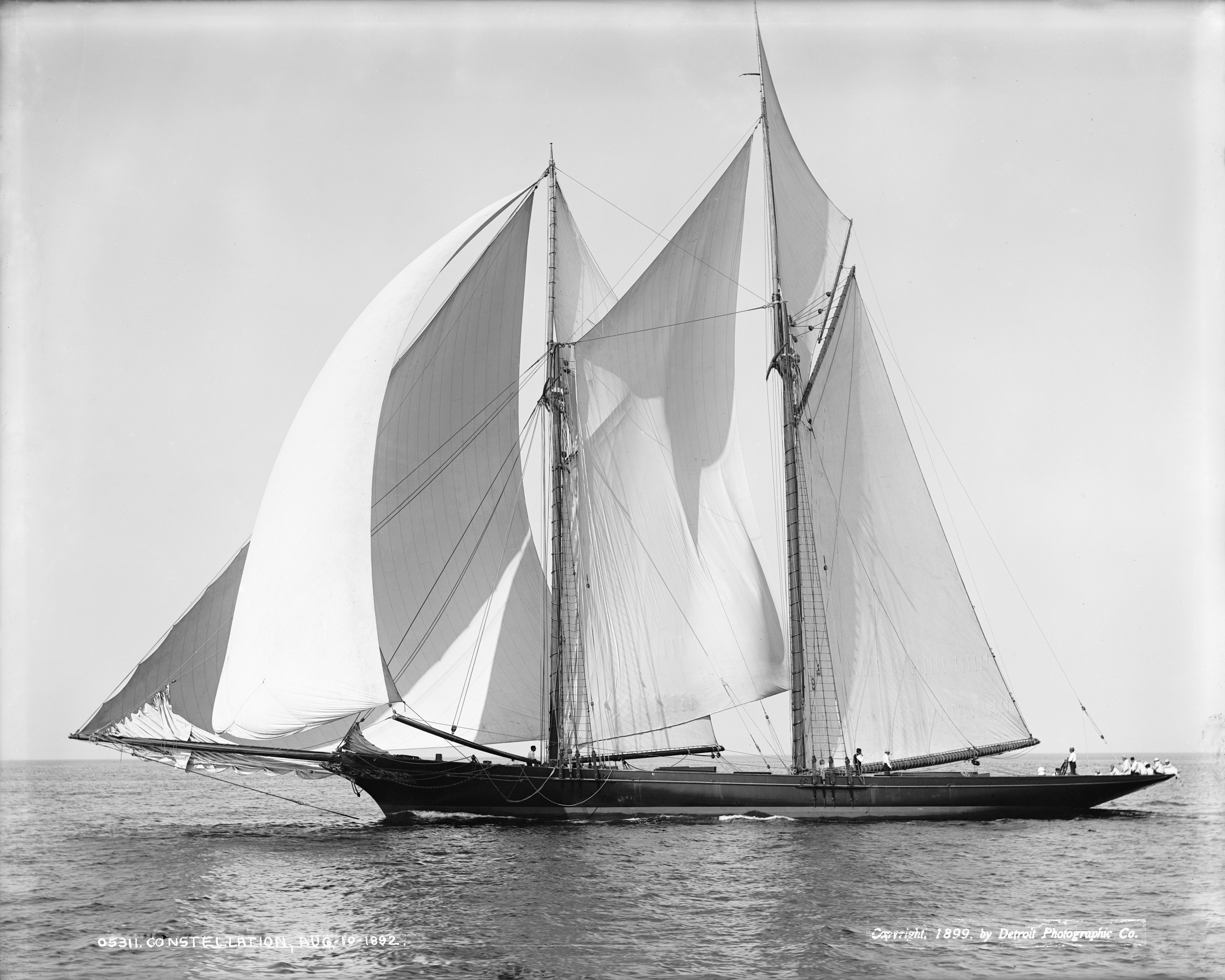
Constellation in 1893

Constellation one of the first large yachts built with a steel hull, and designed with a revolutionary feature where the centerboard did not rise above the cabin floor. She measured 136 feet (41 m) long overall, 107 feet (33 m) long at the waterline, with a 24-foot-9-inch (7.54 m) beam, and a draft of about 12 feet (3.7 m). The top mast was 135 feet (41 m) from the waterline. She was 118 net register tons (NRT) and 157 gross register tons (GRT), with a 12.1-foot (3.7 m) draft. The original main boom was over 90 feet (27 m) long.

== History and ownership ==
Constellation in Marblehead Harbor 1921

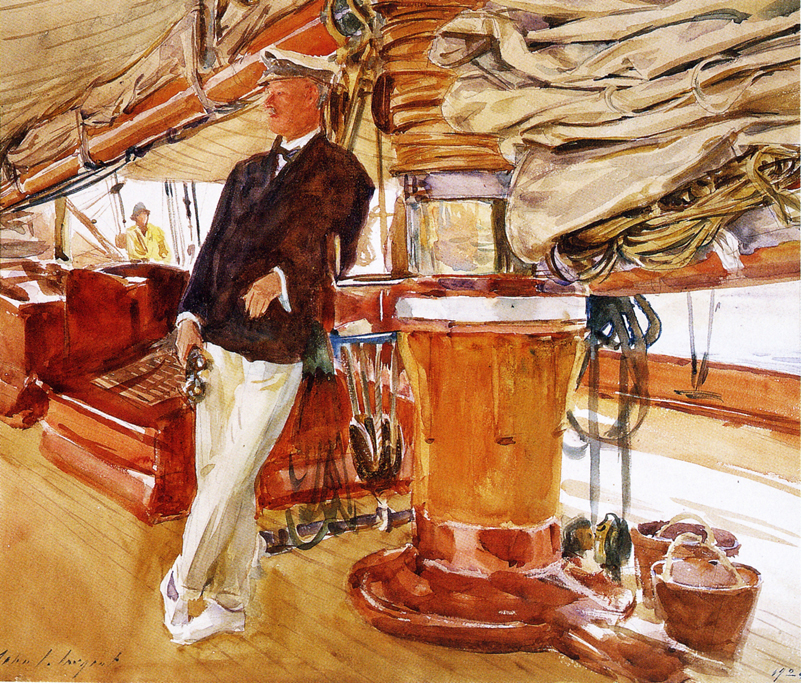
Herbert M. Sears in John Singer Sargent painting "On deck of the yacht Constellation"

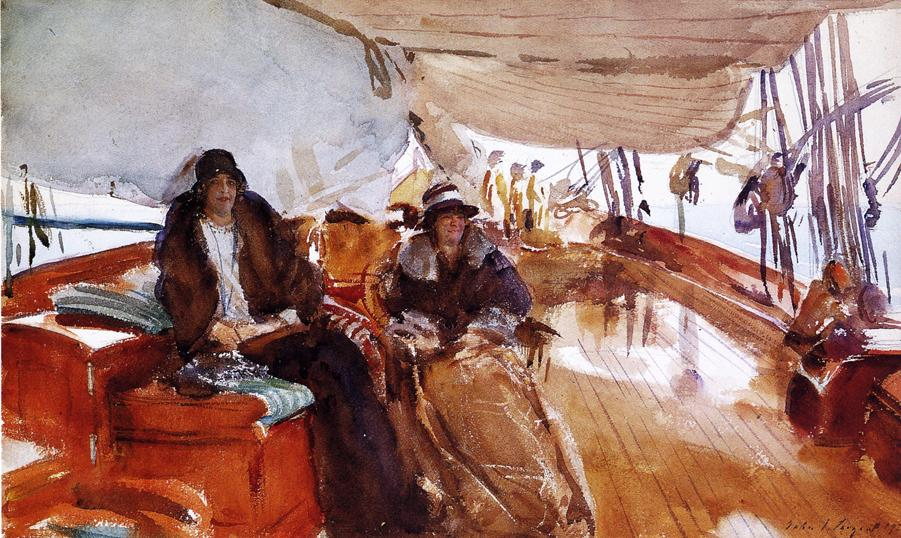
John Singer Sargent - "Rainy day on the deck of the yacht Constellation"

The Constellation was launched on June 20, 1889 in front of a crowd of 300 people, along with designer Edward Burgess, and christened by E.D. Morgan's wife, Elizabeth (Moran) Morgan. Once it entered service, E.D. Morgan kept it anchored off his Newport, Rhode Island estate "Beacon Rock" where it raced as part of the New York Yacht Club fleet. Morgan sold it after only two years, on September 10, 1891.

Bayard Thayer of the Thayer family of Boston and Lancaster, Massachusetts, purchased the schooner for a low price of $40,000. Thayer would continue to sail the Constellation as a racing yacht, where it won many races in her class. Eight years later, in 1899, Thayer sold the Constellation to Francis Skinner of the Eastern Yacht Club, in Marblehead, Massachusetts.

The Constellation's final and longest time owner was Herbert M. Sears, who purchased it in 1914 after fellow yacht club member Francis Skinner's death. He was commodore of the Eastern Yacht Club in Marblehead and the Constellation served as the flagship of the yacht club known as "Queen of the Eastern", leading the fleet for all the races. The schooner would undergo a refit in 1914 with the addition of an auxiliary motor and updated interior cabin fitting. In 1921 George Lawley & Son of Boston would build a new 22-foot (6.7 m) motorized tender launch for the vessel. A 4-cycle, 6-cylinder Winton diesel engine was installed in 1924. The original rig, the bowsprit, and masts were reduced as well. In 1934 the original centerboard was taken out, and a false metal keel was substituted.

Commodore Sears was painted by famed artist John Singer Sargent standing on board the deck in the painting titled "On The Deck of The Yacht Constellation" around 1924 along with "Rainy day on the deck of the yacht Constellation".

Due to the pending war in the Atlantic Ocean, the yacht was laid up for the summer season of 1941 at the George Lawley & Son shipyard, and would never return to service. In September 1941, Herbert Sears decided to donate the much needed metal from the hull to the war effort. The Constellation was scrapped in Neponset, Boston that same year. The stern board, wheel and many other elements were salvaged, and now displayed at the Eastern Yacht Club in Marblehead.
