= USCGC Kangaroo =

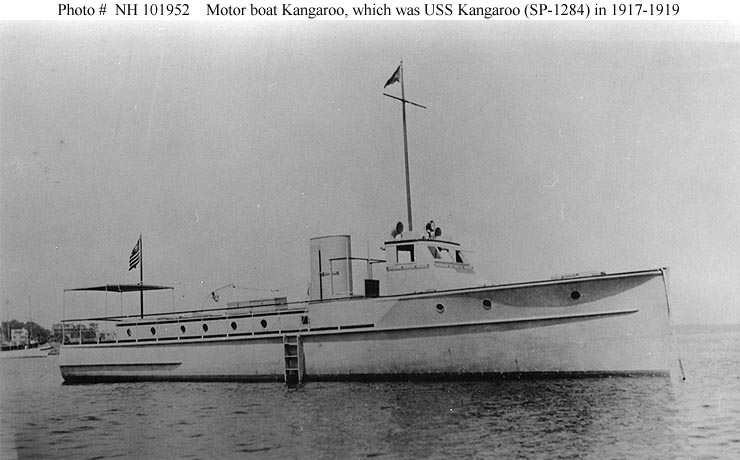
- Kangaroo in 1917 just after her completion and prior to her U.S. Navy and U.S. Coast Guard service.

History

United States
- Name: USCGC Kangaroo (1919-1923); USCGC AB-6 (1923-1932)
- Namesake: The kangaroo (previous name retained)
- Builder: Herreshoff Manufacturing Company, Bristol, Rhode Island
- Completed: 1917
- Acquired: 22 November 1919
- Renamed: USCGC AB-6 6 November 1923
- Fate: Sold 1 October 1932
- Notes: Operated as private motorboat Kangaroo 1917 and as U.S. Navy patrol boat USS Kangaroo (SP-1284) 1917-1919

General characteristics
- Type: Patrol vessel
- Displacement: 29 tons
- Length: 62 ft 4 in (19.00 m)
- Beam: 10 ft 11 in (3.33 m)
- Draft: 3 ft 6 in (1.07 m)
- Installed power: 120 brake horsepower
- Propulsion: 2 x 4-cylinder gasoline engines, twin screws
- Speed: 13 knots
- Complement: 5

USCGC Kangaroo, later USCGC AB-6, was United States Coast Guard patrol boat in commission from 1919 to 1932.

== Construction and United States Navy service ==
Kangaroo was built as the private motorboat Herreshoff Hull # 316 in May 1917 by the Herreshoff Manufacturing Company at Bristol, Rhode Island, one of nine identical motor boats built in anticipation of eventual acquisition by the United States Navy from their private owners. The U.S. Navy purchased her for World War I service later that year, and she was in commission as USS Kangaroo (SP-1284) from 1917 to 1919.

== United States Coast Guard service ==
USS Kangaroo had been out of commission for six months when the U.S. Navy transferred her to the United States Department of the Treasury at Key West, Florida, on 22 November 1919, for use by the U.S. Coast Guard. The Coast Guard commissioned her as USCGC Kangaroo.

The Coast Guard used Kangaroo for customs and coastal surveillance patrols. She served at Key West until assigned to Charleston, South Carolina, on 1 January 1923. She was renamed USCGC AB-6 on 6 November 1923, and later served at Norfolk, Virginia.

AB-6 was sold at Norfolk on 1 October 1932 to John H. Curtis for $200 (USD).
