= Franck Taylor Evans =

American Navy captain (1875–1934)

Franck Taylor Evans (9 September 1875 – 8 March 1934) was a captain in the United States Navy.

== Life ==
Franck Taylor Evans was born in Switzerland on September 9, 1875. His father was Robley D. Evans, a rear admiral in the US Navy. He joined the navy in 1894, graduating in 1898, and joined the crew of the USS Iowa, then captained by his father, seeing action in the Battle of Santiago.

He served as an aide to President Theodore Roosevelt when he visited Panama in November 1906.

In 1908, while assigned to the USS Louisiana as part of the Great White Fleet, he was briefly arrested in San Francisco for drawing his revolver to protect two of his crewmen in a fight in a dance hall. Separately, he was court-martialled for fighting, intoxication, and swearing at a superior officer.

In World War I he commanded the armed yacht USS May. In 1917 he established the naval air station in Lakehurst, New Jersey, and in 1918 took over the naval air station at Pauillac in France. He returned to Lakehurst in 1921, and was the commanding officer there for three more years. He spent two years in charge of the Newport Naval Training Station, and then took command of the cruiser USS Pittsburgh. He was in charge of the Brooklyn Navy Yard from 1927 to 1929, and commanded the USS Idaho for a year, retiring in September 1930.

He was one of the first naval officers to use a smoke screen in battle.

He was awarded the Navy Cross, and received awards from other countries, including the Legion of Honour from France, and decorations from Spain, Greece, Italy, and Japan. He was a hereditary companion of the Military Order of the Loyal Legion of the United States by right of his father's service in the Union Navy during the American Civil War. He was also a veteran companion of the Military Order of Foreign Wars.

He was married twice; first to Gertrude Pullman, whom he married in August 1907, and second to Enid Scarritt. He died in Brooklyn on 8 March 1934.

== Awards ==
- Navy Cross
- Sampson Medal
- Spanish Campaign Medal
- Victory Medal
- Officer of the Legion of Honor (France)
- Order of Naval Merit and Efficiency, Third Class (Spain)
- Cross of the Order of the Savior (Greece)
