= USS Commodore (SP-1425) =

Patrol vessel of the United States Navy (1917–1919)

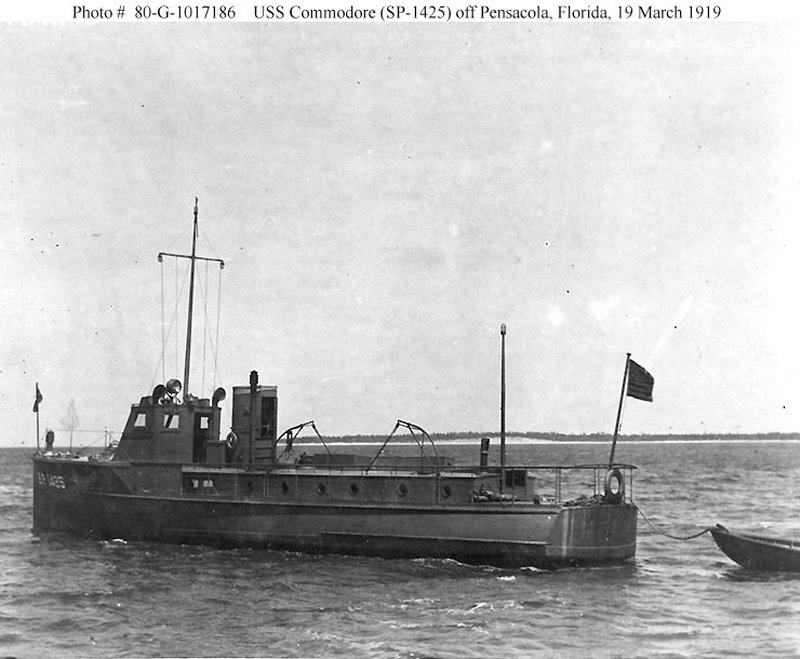
- Commodore off Pensacola, Florida, on 19 March 1919

History

United States
- Name: USS Commodore
- Namesake: Commodore, the junior flag officer rank, standing between captain and rear admiral
- Builder: Herreshoff Manufacturing Company, Bristol, Rhode Island
- Completed: 1917
- Acquired: October 1917
- Commissioned: mid-November 1917
- Decommissioned: May 1919
- Fate: Transferred to U.S. Army October 1919
- Notes: Built as civilian motorboat Herreshoff No. 318

General characteristics
- Type: Patrol vessel
- Length: 62 ft 4 in (19.00 m)
- Armament: 1 machine gun

The second USS Commodore (SP-1425) was an armed motorboat that served in the United States Navy as a patrol vessel from 1917 to 1919. It was financed by Herbert M. Sears as part of the "Eastern Yacht Club 62 footers".

Commodore was built in 1917 by Herreshoff Manufacturing Company at Bristol, Rhode Island, as the civilian motorboat Herreshoff No. 318. The U.S. Navy acquired her in October 1917 for World War I service. She was commissioned as USS Commodore (SP-1425) in mid-November 1917. She spent much of her naval career in Florida waters.

Due to an urgent need for craft such as Commodore at Brest, France, an order dated 14 October 1918 went out from Washington, D.C., to Boston, Massachusetts, directing the Commandant of the 1st Naval District to ready six section patrol boats -- Commodore, USS Cossack (SP-695), USS War Bug (SP-1795), USS Sea Hawk (SP-2365), USS Kangaroo (SP-1284), and USS SP-729—to be shipped to France as deck cargo along with spare parts to keep them operational. However, this proposed movement appears to have been cancelled, probably because of the armistice with Germany of 11 November 1918 that ended World War I and eliminated the need for more U.S. Navy patrol craft in Europe.

Commodore was decommissioned at Naval Air Station Pensacola, Pensacola, Florida, in May 1919. She was transferred to the United States Army in October 1919.
