= Tedford H. Cann =

US Navy ensign and Medal of Honor recipient (1897–1963)

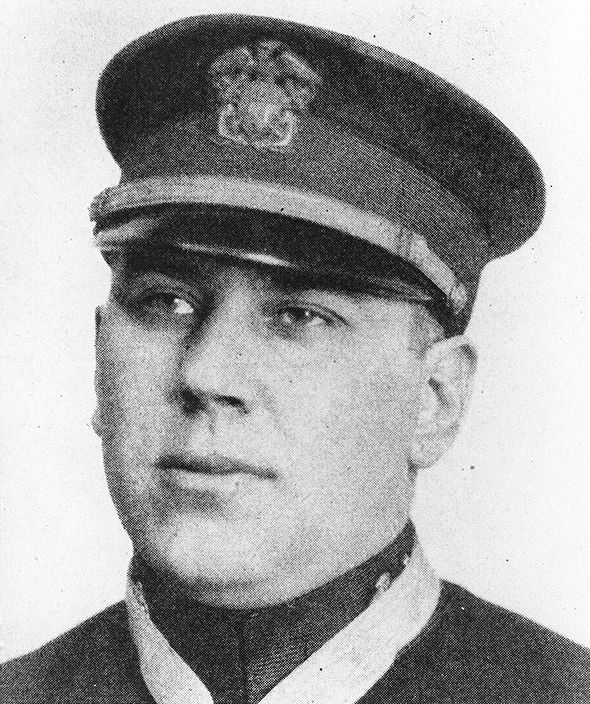
- Ensign Tedford H. Cann, c. 1918

Personal information
- Born: September 3, 1897 Bridgeport, Connecticut, US
- Died: January 26, 1963 (aged 65) Port Chester, New York, US

Sport
- Sport: Swimming
- Strokes: freestyle
- Club: The New York Athletic Club; Detroit Athletic Club
Medal record
Men's swimming
Amateur Athletic Union National Championships
Gold medal – first place	1920	50 m freestyle
Gold medal – first place	1920	100 m freestyle
Gold medal – first place	1920	200 m freestyle
- Military career
- Burial place: Arlington National Cemetery
- Allegiance: United States
- Branch: United States Naval Reserve
- Service years: 1916–1918
- Rank: Ensign
- Units: USS May (SP-164); USS Noma (SP-131)
- Conflicts: World War I
- Awards: Medal of Honor

Tedford Harris Cann (September 3, 1897 – January 26, 1963) was a champion American swimmer and a recipient of the United States military's highest decoration, the Medal of Honor. He served as an officer in the United States Naval Reserve during World War I and earned the medal for saving his sinking ship.

== Early life ==
Cann was born in Bridgeport, Connecticut, into a family of accomplished sportsmen. His father, Frank Cann, was the director of physical education at New York University (NYU), which both Tedford and his older brother Howard Cann attended. Howard was an Olympic shot putter, a college basketball and football player, and the NYU men's basketball coach for 35 years.

Cann's swimming career began while he was still a teenager. He attended the High School of Commerce in New York City where he was captain of the basketball and swimming teams and competed in the New York Championships. Like his older brother he became a member of the Epsilon Chapter of the Omega Gamma Delta Fraternity. At age 17 he defeated Hawaiian swimmer Duke Kahanamoku, an event which he later declared was a greater thrill than being awarded the Medal of Honor. While a student at New York University, Cann also excelled in track and field, basketball, and football, where he played halfback as well as becoming a member of the Fraternity of Phi Gamma Delta.

== Military service ==
He served in the Navy Reserve during World War I, initially as a Seaman. On November 5, 1917, while he was a member of the crew of the patrol vessel USS May (SP-164), Seaman Cann voluntarily swam into a flooded compartment and repeatedly dived beneath the surface until he had located and closed the leak that endangered the ship. He was awarded the Medal of Honor for this act.

In April 1918, Cann was commissioned as an ensign in the Reserves, continuing to serve on the USS May into July. He spent the rest of World War I as an officer on the USS Noma (SP-131) and left the service shortly after the conflict's end.

== Post-war life ==
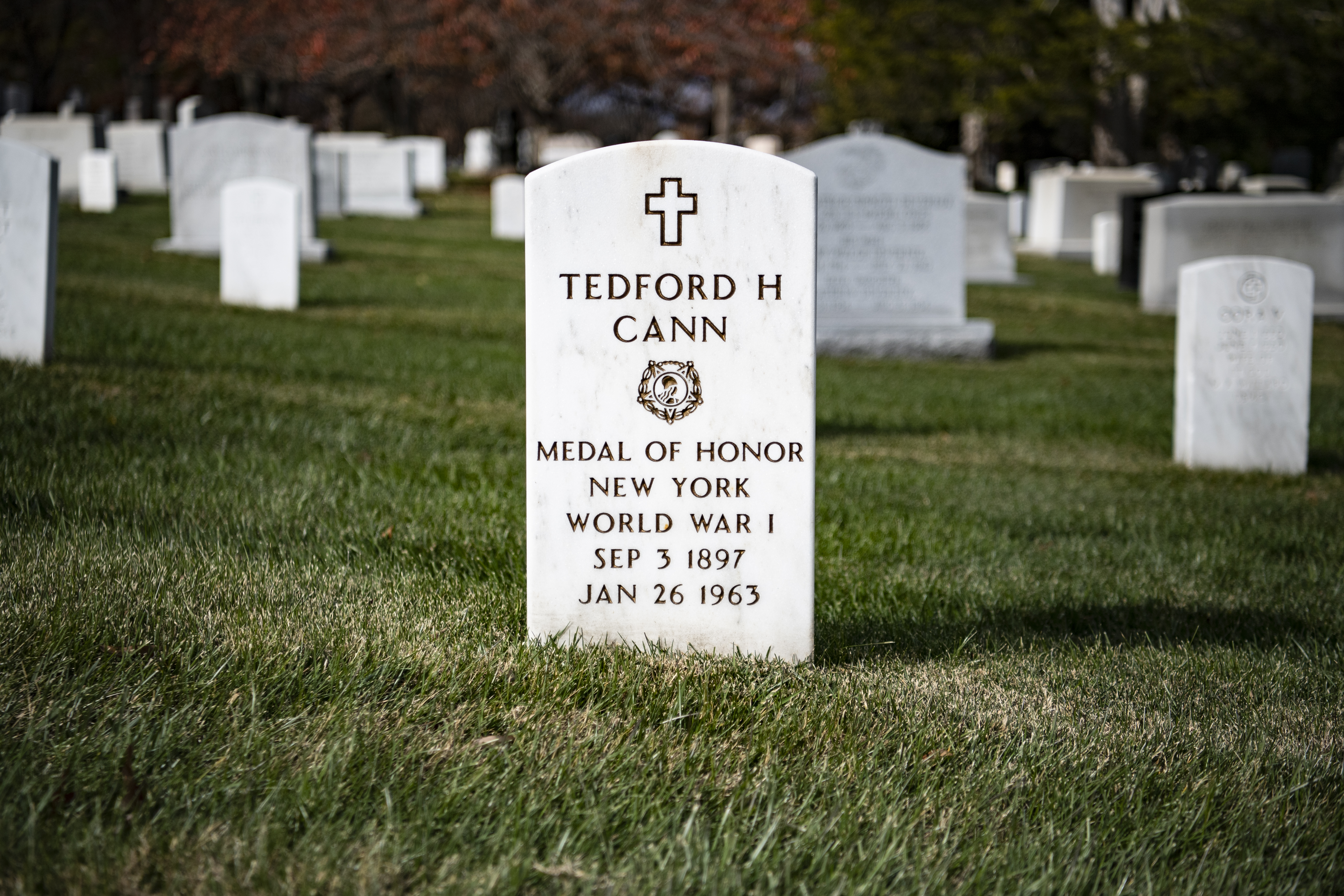
Grave at Arlington National Cemetery

Cann resumed his swimming career after the war. Coached by Matt Mann, Cann swam with The New York Athletic Club and later the Detroit Athletic Club. On April 10, 1920 in Detroit, Michigan, he set the world record in the 200 meter freestyle (then called the 220 yard freestyle) with a time of 2:19.8, breaking the previous record of 2:21.6 set by Norman Ross in 1916. His record would stand until 1922, when Johnny Weissmuller swam the distance in 2:15.6. Also in 1920, Cann won the Amateur Athletic Union National Championships in the 50, 100 and 200 meter races, becoming the first person to win all three of those titles in a single year.

He had qualified for and was preparing to participate in the 1920 Summer Olympics in Antwerp when he was involved in a serious car accident. Early in the morning of May 11, 1920, Cann and two other Olympic-hopefuls were in a taxicab in New York City, returning home from a late night out, when the driver crashed into an elevated railroad pillar. One of Cann's fellow passengers was fatally injured, and Cann's leg was broken in six places. He missed the Olympics due to his injury, which required him to use crutches for more than a year and left him with a permanent limp. Although he was never able to swim as quickly as he had before the accident, Cann took up water polo with much success. He participated in the 1924 Summer Olympics in Paris and played with The New York Athletic Club national champion polo team up to the early 1930s.

Cann died at age 65 and is buried with his wife Marguerite (1897–1985) in Arlington National Cemetery, Arlington County, Virginia. Four years after his death, in 1967, he was posthumously inducted into the International Swimming Hall of Fame for his accomplishments as a swimmer.

== Medal of Honor citation ==
Rank and organization: Seaman, U.S. Navy. Born: September 3, 1897, Bridgeport, Conn. Accredited to: New York. G.O. No.: 366, 1918.

Citation:

For courageous conduct while serving on board the U.S.S. May, 5 November 1917. Cann found a leak in a flooded compartment and closed it at the peril of his life, thereby unquestionably saving the ship.

== See also ==
- List of Medal of Honor recipients
- List of Medal of Honor recipients for World War I
- World record progression 200 metres freestyle
