= USS Cossack (SP-695) =

Patrol vessel of the United States Navy

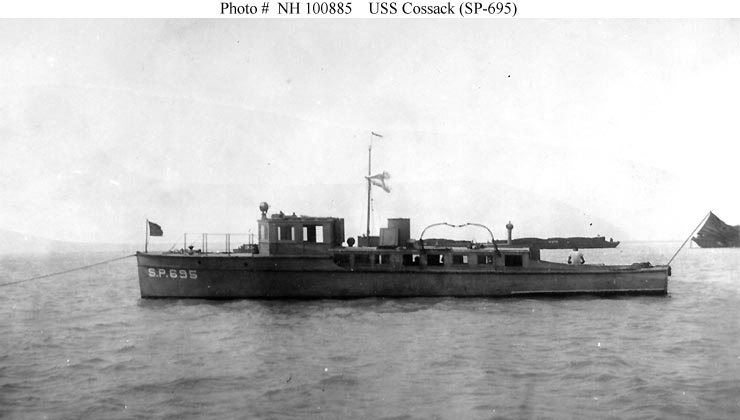
- USS Cossack in 1919 after post-World War I removal of her armament.

History

United States
- Name: USS Cossack
- Namesake: A Cossack, a member of militaristic communities living in Ukraine and southern Russia (previous name retained)
- Builder: George Lawley & Son, Neponset, Massachusetts
- Completed: 1916
- Acquired: April 1917
- Commissioned: 1 May 1917
- Stricken: 27 March 1919
- Fate: Transferred to U.S. Coast Guard 22 November 1919
- Notes: Operated as civilian motorboat Cossack 1916-1917; In U.S. Coast Guard service as USCGC Cossack 1919-1923 and as USCGC AB-3 1923-1925; destroyed by fire 9 May 1925

General characteristics
- Type: Patrol vessel
- Length: 64 ft (20 m)
- Speed: 23 miles per hour

The second USS Cossack (SP-695) was an armed motorboat that served in the United States Navy as a patrol vessel from 1917 to 1919.

== Construction, acquisition, and commissioning ==
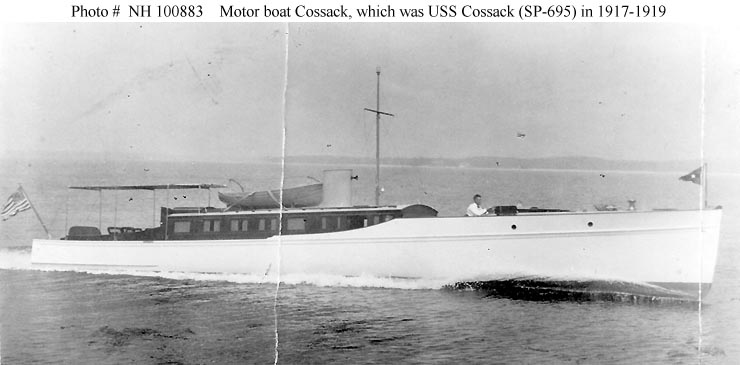
Cossack as civilian motorboat in 1916 or 1917, prior to her acquisition by the U.S. Navy.

Cossack was built as a civilian motorboat of the same name in 1916 by George Lawley & Son of Neponset, Massachusetts. Upon the entry of the United States into World War I, the U.S. Navy acquired her in April 1917 for war service as a patrol boat. She was commissioned as USS Cossack (SP-695) at Boston on 1 May 1917.

== Service history ==
=== World War I ===
Assigned to the 1st Naval District, Cossack conducted patrols in the Boston, Massachusetts, until October 1918.

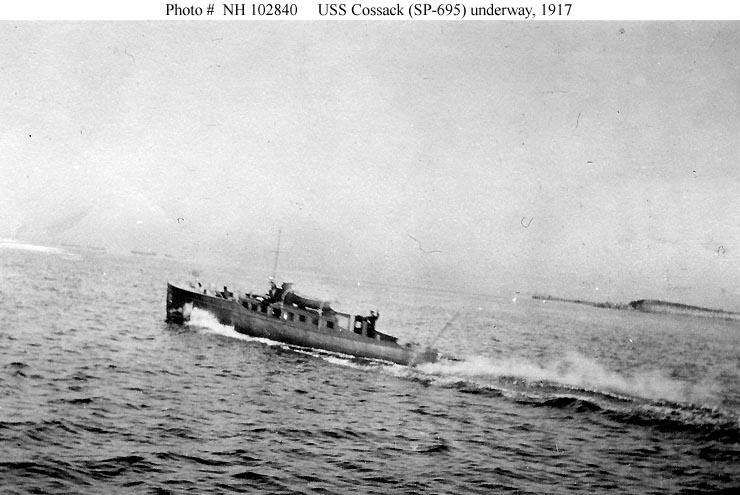
USS Cossack underway ca. summer 1917, probably off Boston, Massachusetts.

Due to an urgent need for craft such as Cossack at Brest, France, an order dated 14 October 1918 went out from Washington, D.C., to Boston, directing the Commandant of the 1st Naval District to ready six section patrol boats -- USS Commodore (SP-1425), Cossack, USS War Bug (SP-1795), USS Sea Hawk (SP-2365), USS Kangaroo (SP-1284), and USS SP-729—to be shipped to France as deck cargo along with spare parts to keep them operational. However, this proposed movement appears to have been cancelled, probably because of the armistice with Germany of 11 November 1918 that ended World War I and eliminated the need for more U.S. Navy patrol craft in Europe.

Instead, Cossack was reassigned to the 3rd Naval District in October 1918, probably for patrol service in the New York City area.

== Decommissioning and disposal ==
Cossack was stricken from the Navy List on 27 March 1919. She was turned over to the United States Coast Guard on 22 November 1919.

== United States Coast Guard service ==
As USCGC Cossack, she was stationed at Tampa, Florida. Renamed USCGC AB-3 in November 1923, she was destroyed by fire on 9 May 1925.
