= USS May =

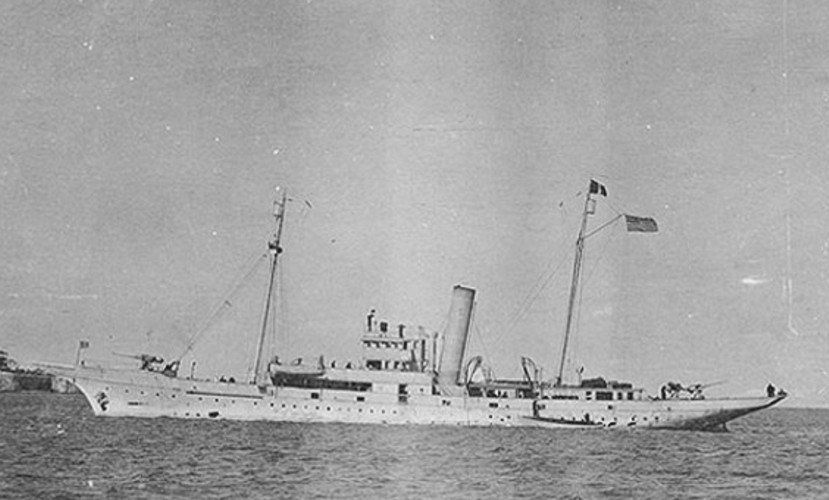
- USS May (SP-164) at Bermuda in November 1917.

History

United States
- Name: USS May
- Namesake: A former name retained
- Owner: J. R. De Lamar
- Builder: Ailsa Shipbuilding Co., Troon, Scotland
- Laid down: date unknown
- Completed: 1891
- Acquired: by the Navy, 11 August 1917
- Commissioned: 7 October 1917
- Decommissioned: 28 February 1920 (wrecked and abandoned)
- Stricken: 1920 (est.)
- Home port: New London, Connecticut
- Honors and awards: Medal of Honor issued to Tedford H. Cann
- Fate: Abandoned, 28 February 1920; no buyers found for the hulk

General characteristics
- Type: Yacht
- Displacement: 100 long tons (102 t)
- Length: 239 ft 1 in (72.87 m)
- Beam: 27 ft 10 in (8.48 m)
- Draft: 15 ft (4.6 m)
- Propulsion: Steam engine
- Speed: 13 kn (15 mph; 24 km/h)
- Complement: 77 officers and enlisted
- Armament: 2 × 3 in (76 mm) guns, 2 × .30 in (7.6 mm) machine guns

USS May (SP-164) was a yacht purchased by the United States Navy during World War I. She was outfitted with two 3 in (76 mm) guns and two machine guns, and was assigned to patrol the Atlantic Ocean coast and Caribbean and to protect Allied ships from German submarines. After over two years of patrol work, she ran aground off Cape Engano on the Dominican Republic and had to be abandoned.

== A Scottish-built yacht ==
May — a 1,100 long tons (1,118 t) steam yacht built in 1891 by Ailsa Shipbuilding Co., Troon, Scotland — was originally brought to the United States by E.D. Morgan III as private yacht, and later was purchased by the U.S. Navy from J. R. De Lamar on 11 August 1917; and commissioned on 7 October 1917.

May as a private yacht

== World War I service ==
Operating out of New London, Connecticut, May patrolled along the Atlantic coast and in the Caribbean during World War I, protecting vital Allied shipping from German U-boats. At that time, she was commanded by future admiral Franck Taylor Evans.

=== Run aground and abandoned ===
As of March 1919, she was intended for eventual service as a flagship, but she ran aground on a reef off Cape Engano, Santo Domingo on 27 July 1919; after efforts to refloat her failed she was declared abandoned on 28 February 1920.

After unfruitful attempts to refloat her, May's wreck was offered for sale. However, no purchasers appeared, and she was abandoned as unsalable in June 1923.

=== Awards and honors ===
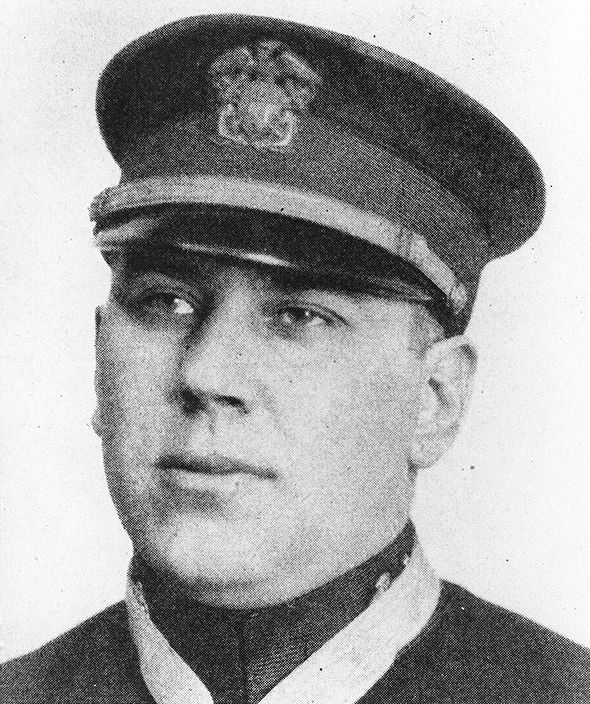
Tedford H. Cann

Ensign Tedford H. Cann, USNRF was awarded the Medal of Honor for "courageous conduct" onboard May in November 1917. His citation reads:

For courageous conduct while serving on board the U.S.S. May, 5 November 1917. Cann found a leak in a flooded compartment and closed it at the peril of his life, thereby unquestionably saving the ship.
