= Robley D. Evans (admiral) =

United States Navy admiral (1846–1912)

Robley Dunglison Evans
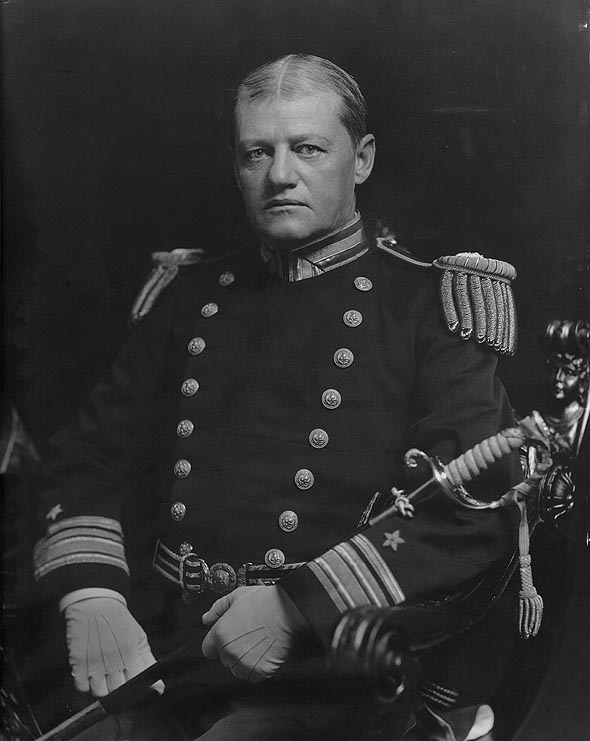
- Born: 18 August 1846; Floyd County, Virginia, US
- Died: 3 January 1912 (aged 65); Washington, D.C., US
- Military career
- Allegiance: United States of America; Union
- Branch: United States Navy; Union Navy
- Service years: 1864 – circa 1908
- Rank: Rear admiral
- Nickname: "Fighting Bob" Evans
- Units: commanded the United States Navy's "Great White Fleet" on its world-wide cruise of 1907–1908
- Conflicts: American Civil War; Second Battle of Fort Fisher; Spanish–American War; Battle of Santiago de Cuba

Robley Dunglison Evans (18 August 1846 – 3 January 1912), born in Floyd County, Virginia, was a rear admiral in the United States Navy, who served from the American Civil War to the Spanish–American War. In 1907–1908, he commanded the Great White Fleet on its worldwide cruise from the Atlantic Ocean through the Straits of Magellan to the Pacific Ocean.

== Naval service ==
In 1859, Utah Territory delegate William Henry Hooper offered Evans the territory's nomination to the United States Naval Academy. After establishing residency in Utah, he entered the academy in 1860. Evans was ordered to active duty in September 1863 and graduated from the academy in the class of 1864.

=== American Civil War service ===
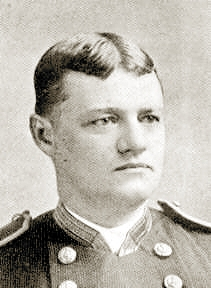
Early photo

In the attacks on Fort Fisher, North Carolina, during the Second Battle of Fort Fisher, he exhibited great gallantry under fire on 15 January 1865. He led his landing party of United States Marines through heavy fire to charge the Confederate defenses. Evans continued to fight even after his fourth wound, drawing his pistol and threatening to kill any man who attempted to amputate his leg in surgery when he was evacuated.

=== "Fighting Bob" Evans ===
Evans held numerous important sea commands during the 1890s. In 1891 and 1892, commanding Yorktown on the Pacific Squadron, he won great acclaim for his firm and skillful handling of a tense situation with Chile, becoming known as "Fighting Bob" Evans. Though he evidently took pride in his nickname, his reputation for profanity also led to his being chastised by Leonard Woolsey Bacon, pastor of the Congregational Church in Litchfield, Connecticut, in a letter to The New York Times.

=== Naval Secretary of the Lighthouse Board ===
On 30 November 1892 Commander Evans took office as the Naval Secretary of the Lighthouse Board of the United States, a posting in Washington, D.C. During his tenure at the Lighthouse Board, in June 1893, he was promoted to Captain.

Evans was friends with President Grover Cleveland, and during his time in Washington, he traveled with the President several times. On 26 December 1893 the President, Secretary of State Walter Q. Gresham, Secretary of the Treasury John G. Carlisle, and Evans boarded USLHT Violet in Washington, and cruised the Potomac River for relaxation. They returned on 29 December 1893. This same foursome cruised North Carolina sounds on a hunting and fishing trip aboard Violet in May 1894. Evans accompanied Cleveland on a cruise aboard USLHT Maple for the President's health in June 1894. Evans' service with the Lighthouse Board ended on 16 August 1894. He took up the command of the newly-built cruiser, USS New York, later that month.

=== USS Indiana ===
The United States' first seagoing battleship, USS Indiana, was placed in commission on 20 November 1895, with Captain Evans in command. Former President Benjamin Harrison, with a committee from the state of Indiana, presented a set of silver to Evans for the battleship on 16 September 1896 at Tompkinsville, New York.

=== Spanish–American War service ===
During the Spanish–American War, he commanded the battleship USS Iowa (BB-4) in the Battle of Santiago de Cuba.

=== Shore duty ===
Robley Dunglison Evans was promoted to rear admiral on 11 February 1901 and was reassigned as president of the Board of Inspection and Survey from February 1901 to April 1902.

=== Prince Henry of Prussia ===
President Theodore Roosevelt selected Admiral Robley D. Evans to host Prince Heinrich of Prussia, brother of Germany's Kaiser Wilhelm II. 15 February 1902, Admiral Evans, as Commander-in-Chief of a special honor squadron, hoisted his flag on the battleship USS Illinois (BB-7) at the New York Navy Yard. Evans feted Prince Henry during the visit of the Kaiserliche Marine Imperial German Navy. After the departure of the German prince, 28 February 1902, Evans' flag was hauled down on Illinois.

=== Commander-in-Chief – Asiatic Fleet ===
Admiral Evans transferred his flag from armored cruiser, USS New York (ACR-2) on 4 November 1902 to battleship, USS Kentucky (BB-6) at Yokohama, Japan. On 5 December 1903, the Kentucky left Japanese waters for Hawaii; on 17 December 1903, the Kentucky arrived at Pearl Harbor Naval Station, Hawaii. Admiral Evans hosted a Christmas dinner for the officers of Kentucky at the Moana Hotel in Waikiki. 31 December 1903 Evans' flagship departed Honolulu for Guam. Kentucky arrived in Cavite, the Philippines, on 18 January 1904. Admiral Evans called on the new Governor-General of the Philippines, Luke Edward Wright, at the Malacanang Palace. Evans' flagship departed Manila on 13 March 1904. The Kentucky coaled at Hong Kong and Colombo. Sailing through the Suez Canal into the Mediterranean Sea to the port of Naples, Italy, the voyage continued to Gibraltar, coaling at Madeira; the flagship Kentucky arrived at the New York Navy Yard, 23 May 1904. Admiral Evans hauled down his flag, 27 May 1904 from battleship Kentucky.

=== Commander-in-Chief – North Atlantic Fleet ===
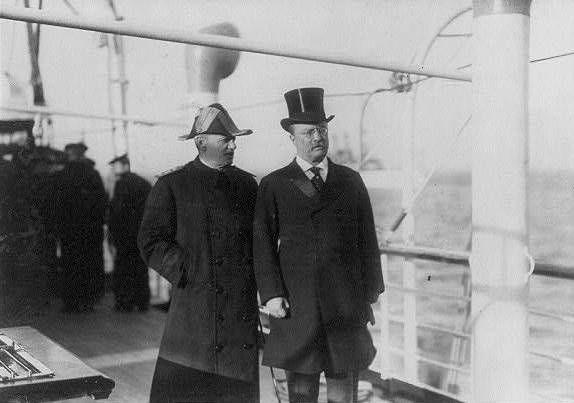
Evans (left) and President Theodore Roosevelt aboard Roosevelt's yacht, The Mayflower

On 31 March 1905, a 13-gun salute was fired by the battleship USS Maine at Pensacola, Florida, as the flag of Rear Admiral Robley D. Evans, Commander-in-Chief of the North Atlantic Fleet, was broken at the main mast. The fleet sailed on 7 May 1905 for Hampton Roads, Virginia. Admiral Evans returned to his alma mater the United States Naval Academy at Annapolis, Maryland, on 30 October 1905.

The British Fleet under command of Prince Louis of Battenberg arrived at Annapolis. On 1 November 1905, the Prince visited Evans on Maine. Admiral Evans gave Prince Louis a tour of the Naval Academy and battleship Maine. A reception by Evans was held later in the week on the Maine for Governor Edwin Warfield of Maryland.

Admiral Evans on the flagship Maine sailed on 7 November 1905 from Annapolis to New York. Admiral Evans stayed on board Maine during repairs from 20 November 1905 to January 1906. After winter quarters in Guantanamo Bay, Cuba, on 3 May 1906, Evans returned the fleet to New York. On 2 September 1906, the Maine anchored next to the presidential yacht Mayflower off Oyster Bay, Long Island. President Theodore Roosevelt came on board Maine to confer with Evans. Admiral Evans on the Maine departed New York on 28 December for winter quarters in Cuban waters. On 15 April 1907, Evans' flagship Maine returned to Hampton Roads. On 16 April 1907, Evans hauled down his flag on the Maine and then hoisted it on the battleship Connecticut, flagship for the world cruise.

=== The Great White Fleet ===
Rear Admiral Evans commanded the Great White Fleet 16 April 1907 from Hampton Roads, Virginia, in its passage from the Atlantic Ocean through the Straits of Magellan to the Pacific Ocean, where he was relieved of command in San Francisco, California, 9 May 1908, because of ill health.

Admiral Evans retired from the Navy upon reaching the mandatory retirement age of 62 on 18 August 1908.

He died in Washington, DC, on 3 January 1912.

== Honors ==
Rear Admiral Evans was awarded the Civil War Campaign Medal, Sampson Medal, and Spanish Campaign Medal.

On 6 November 1878 he was elected as a first class companion of the Massachusetts Commandery of the Military Order of the Loyal Legion of the United States and was assigned insignia number 1863. On 1 February 1882 he transferred to the District of Columbia Commandery as a charter member. In 1888 he became a companion of the Pennsylvania Commandery of the Military Order of Foreign Wars.

== Legacy and personal life ==
Two destroyers, USS Evans (DD-78), launched 30 October 1918, and USS Evans (DD-552), launched 4 October 1942, were named in his honor.

Evans Avenue in San Francisco is named for him. Evans Street in Newport, Rhode Island is also named for him.

Franck Taylor Evans, a captain in the United States Navy, was his son.

== Dates of rank ==
- Acting midshipman, 20 September 1860
- Acting ensign, 1 October 1863
- Master, on Retired List, 10 May 1866
- Lieutenant on Retired List, 25 July 1866, Active List, 25 January 1867
- Lieutenant commander, 12 March 1868, Active List
- Commander, 12 July 1878
- Captain, 27 June 1893
- Rear admiral, 11 February 1901
- Retired List, 18 August 1908

Total time in service – 47 years, 10 months, 28 days

== Gallery ==
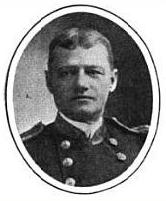

Military offices
Preceded by none	Commander-in-Chief, United States Asiatic Fleet; 29 October 1902 – 21 March 1904	Succeeded by Philip H. Cooper
Preceded by Albert S. Barker	Commander-in-Chief, North Atlantic Fleet; March 1905 – 1 January 1906	Succeeded by none
Preceded by none	Commander-in-Chief, United States Atlantic Fleet; 1 January 1906 – May 1908	Succeeded by Charles S. Sperry
