= Edwin D. Morgan III =

American yachtsman

- Born: Alfred Waterman Morgan; October 19, 1854; Throggs Neck, New York, U.S.
- Died: June 13, 1933 (aged 78); Windsor, Vermont, U.S.
- Resting place: Cedar Hill Cemetery; Hartford, Connecticut, U.S.
- Education: Harvard College
- Occupation: Businessman
- Spouses: Mary Brewer Penniman (m. 1880–1886) Elizabeth Mary Moran (m. 1888)
- Children: Elizabeth Sarah; Edwin Denison Jr. Theodore Moran; Thomas Archer; Katharine Evarts; Jasper (all with 2nd wife Elizabeth)
- Parent(s): Edwin Denison Morgan II (1834–1879); Sarah Elizabeth Archer
- Relatives: Edwin D. Morgan (grandfather)

Edwin Denison Morgan III (born Alfred Waterman Morgan; October 19, 1854 – June 13, 1933) was an American businessman and yachtsman.

== Life and career ==
Born in 1854 as Alfred Waterman Morgan, he was the grandson of New York governor Edwin D. Morgan, and a distant relative of financier J.P. Morgan. He graduated from Harvard College in 1877. He changed his name to Edwin Denison Morgan III at the request of his grandfather after the premature death of his father, Edwin Denison Morgan II (1834–1879).

After college, he became a highly successful businessman and was the founder of Nassau Light and Power, a shareholder in many significant livestock interests, and the president of mining companies in Mexico (including the Corralitos Company and Candelaria Mining Co.) at the beginning of the 1900s.

== Notable residences ==
Beacon Rock in Newport, Rhode Island

=== Beacon Rock ===
Beacon Rock was Morgan's summer home in Newport, Rhode Island. It was completed for him around 1890 and nicknamed the "Acropolis of Newport". It was designed by architect Stanford White of McKim, Mead & White. With deep water on both sides of the peninsula in Bretons Cove, he kept his large yacht Constellation, along with the smaller racing yachts he owned, while residing there.

=== Wheatly ===
Wheatly in Old Westbury, New York

Wheatly was Morgan's residence on Long Island in the village of Old Westbury (formerly Wheatley Hills) in North Hempstead, New York. It was built over a 10-year period from 1890 to 1900, and it designed by the architectural firm of McKim, Mead & White. Morgan owned over 650 acres in Wheatley Hills at the time. It became one of Long Island's largest and most complete estates.

The estate's stables burned down in 1907. The home was sold to Randall J. Le Boeuf in 1937. Parts of the house were demolished in the 1950s for a residential development. The home is now in pieces, with both wings of the house constituting separate houses. The home's chapel was also made into a private residence. The majority of the former estate now comprises The Wheatley School.

== Yachting activities ==
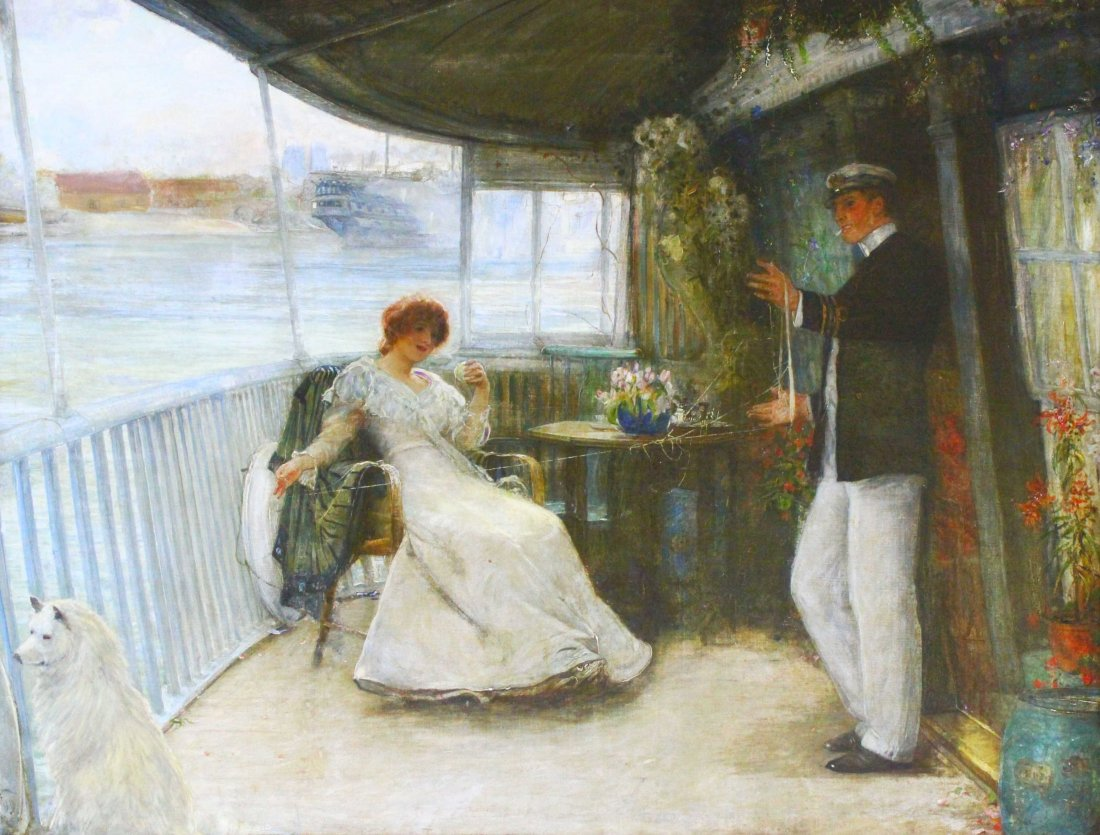
Morgan and his wife Elizabeth on their yacht May, by William Bruce Ellis Ranken

Morgan was rear commodore (1887–8), vice commodore (1891-2) and then commodore (1923-4) of the New York Yacht Club. He was part of the winning team of the America's Cup Yacht Race in 1901 aboard the yacht Columbia.

He had a close relationship with yacht designer Nathaniel Herreshoff, who designed many yachts for him. Morgan also commissioned the construction of the largest steel hull schooner of the time, the Constellation, designed by Edward Burgess. Over his lifetime, Morgan owned over 17 vessels, ranging from steamers to schooners.

E.D. Morgan's Yachts					
Name	Year built	Builder	Specifications	Notes	Fate
Dudley				One of his first Sloops	
Amy	1880	Cunliffe & Dunlop, Port Glasgow, Scotland	187.5 Feet long x 27 feet beam	Purchased in 1884	
Whisper			72 feet long	Steam yacht	
Constellation	1889	Piepgras Shipyard, City Island, NY	136 Feet long	*Built for Morgan; Designed by Edward Burgess; Sold in 1892	Scrapped 1941, Boston
Catarina	1880	Robert Steele & Co., Greenock, Scotland	186.4 ft Long x 26.1 ft beam	Purchased in 1889 the former British built yacht Sans Peur, renamed Catarina; Wrecked and abandoned on Matinnicock Point, Long Island, later salvaged by Daniel W. Sullivan and rebuilt.	Foundered in a gale near Ras el Fasori, Syria in 1941
May	1891	Ailsa Shipbuilding Co., Troon, Scotland	240 feet Long	Flagship of the New York Yacht Club; Sold to J.R. DeLamar, then purchased by the U.S. Navy during WWI, renamed USS May (SP-164)	Wrecked on reef, abandoned 1923, Cape Engano, Santo Domingo
Ituna	1886	A. & J. Inglis Ltd., Glasgow, Scotland	133 feet long	Used during Regattas when Morgan vice-commodore of the New York Yacht Club; Sold, and eventually became a passenger ship, then fishing trawler where it sank en route from San Francisco to Reedsport Oregon in 1920.	Sank 1920, California Coast
Gloriana	1891	Herreshoff Manufacturing Company Bristol, Rhode Island Coque/Hull #411	46 feet long	Designed by Nathaniel Herreshoff	Broken up at Lawley's in late 1910 after being damaged following a grounding
Javelin	1891	Herreshoff Manufacturing Company Bristol, Rhode Island	98 feet long	Built W.R. Hearst, completed for Morgan; Designed by Nathaniel Herreshoff	Morgan sold it to the Brazilian Navy, who renamed her Poty, and then was converted to a torpedo boat aboard the cruiser Nictheroy
Whisper (II)	1902		15 feet long	Designed by Nathaniel Herreshoff; Spent most of her early years in western Long Island Sound; Current Name: Echo	Still Active
