= USS Kangaroo (SP-1284) =

Patrol vessel of the United States Navy

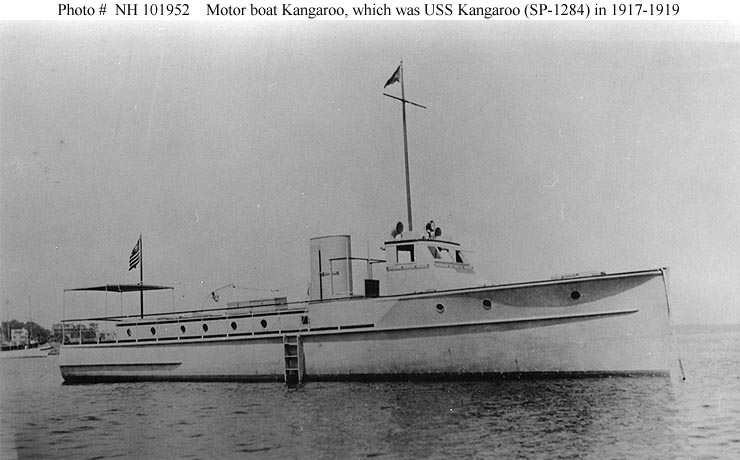
- Kangaroo in 1917 just after her completion and prior to her acquisition by the U.S. Navy

History

United States
- Name: USS Kangaroo
- Namesake: The kangaroo (previous name retained)
- Builder: Herreshoff Manufacturing Company, Bristol, Rhode Island
- Completed: 1917
- Acquired: 18 September 1917
- Commissioned: 10 December 1917
- Decommissioned: 20 May 1919
- Notes: Operated as private motorboat Kangaroo 1917, as U.S. Coast Guard patrol boat USCGC Kangaroo 1919-1923 and USCGC AB-6 1923-1932, and as a private motorboat from 1932

General characteristics
- Type: Patrol vessel
- Displacement: 29 tons
- Length: 62 ft 4 in (19.00 m)
- Beam: 10 ft 11 in (3.33 m)
- Draft: 3 ft 6 in (1.07 m)
- Installed power: 120 brake horsepower
- Propulsion: 2 × 4-cylinder gasoline engines, twin screws
- Speed: 21 knots
- Complement: 11
- Armament: 1 × 1-pounder gun

The first USS Kangaroo (SP-1284) was an armed motorboat that served in the United States Navy as a patrol vessel from 1917 to 1919.

== Construction and commissioning ==
Kangaroo was built as the private motorboat Herreshoff Hull # 316 in May 1917 by the Herreshoff Manufacturing Company at Bristol, Rhode Island, one of nine identical motor boats built in anticipation of eventual acquisition by the U.S. Navy from their private owners. Her civilian owner, Henry A. Morse of Marblehead, Massachusetts, had named her Kangaroo by the time the U.S. Navy purchased her from him at Boston, Massachusetts, on 18 September 1917 for service as a patrol boat in World War I. She was commissioned on 10 December 1917 as USS Kangaroo (SP-1284).

== United States Navy service ==
Assigned to the 1st Naval District, Kangaroo served on section patrol and inner harbor patrol in Penobscot Bay, Maine, until 14 October 1918, when she departed for Key West, Florida.

Due to an urgent need for craft such as Kangaroo at Brest, France, an order dated 14 October 1918 went out from Washington, D.C., to Boston directing the Commandant of the 1st Naval District to ready six section patrol boats -- USS Commodore (SP-1425), USS Cossack (SP-695), USS War Bug (SP-1795), USS Sea Hawk (SP-2365), Kangaroo, and USS SP-729—to be shipped to France as deck cargo along with spare parts to keep them operational. However, this proposed movement appears to have been cancelled, probably because of the armistice with Germany of 11 November 1918 that ended World War I and eliminated the need for more U.S. Navy patrol craft in Europe.

Instead, Kangaroo arrived at Key West on 12 January 1919. Based there, she performed patrol and dispatch duties along the Florida Keys and in Florida's Atlantic coastal waters.

Kangaroo was decommissioned on 20 May 1919.

== Later career ==
On 22 November 1919, Kangaroo was transferred to the United States Department of the Treasury for use by the United States Coast Guard, which commissioned her as USCGC Kangaroo. Renamed USCGC AB-6 in 1923, she served in the Coast Guard until sold in 1932.
