= USS Sea Hawk =

Patrol vessel of the United States Navy

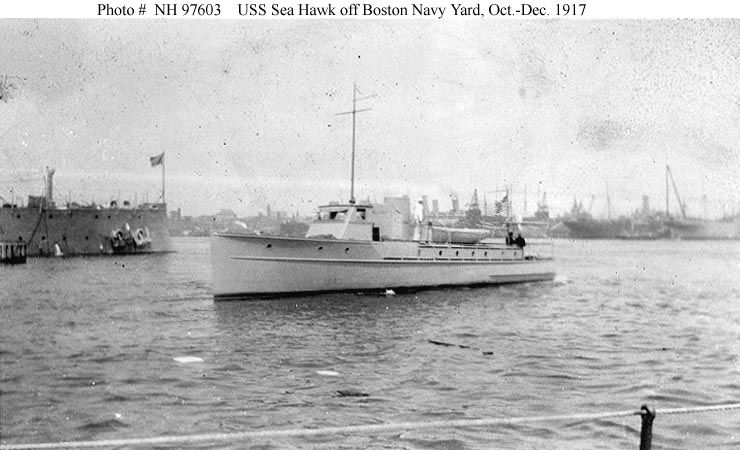
- USS Sea Hawk off the Boston Navy Yard, sometime between October and December 1917.

History

United States
- Name: USS Sea Hawk
- Namesake: The sea hawk, also called the skua, a gull-like bird of prey
- Builder: Herreshoff Manufacturing Company
- Completed: 1917
- Acquired: 20 October 1917
- Commissioned: December 1917
- Fate: Wrecked 9–10 September 1919
- Notes: Built as civilian motorboat Herreshoff No. 319

General characteristics
- Type: Patrol vessel
- Tonnage: 29 tons
- Length: 62 ft 4 in (19.00 m)
- Beam: 11 ft 2 in (3.40 m)
- Armament: 1 × 1-pounder gun

USS Sea Hawk (SP-2365) was an armed motorboat that served in the United States Navy as a patrol vessel from 1917 to 1919.

Sea Hawk was built in 1917 by Herreshoff Manufacturing Company at Bristol, Rhode Island, as the civilian motorboat Herreshoff No. 319. The U.S. Navy acquired her from Arthur Winslow of Boston, Massachusetts, on 20 October 1917 for World War I service as a patrol boat. She was commissioned as USS Sea Hawk (SP-2365) in December 1917.

Sea Hawk initially served as a patrol boat in the 1st Naval District, operating in the Boston area. Later she was transferred to the 7th Naval District for employment in Florida waters.

Due to an urgent need for craft such as Sea Hawk at Brest, France, an order dated 14 October 1918 went out from Washington, D.C., to Boston, directing the Commandant of the 1st Naval District to ready six section patrol boats -- USS Commodore, Cossack, War Bug, Sea Hawk, Kangaroo, and SP-729—to be shipped to France as deck cargo along with spare parts to keep them operational. However, this proposed movement appears to have been canceled, probably because of the armistice with Germany of 11 November 1918 that ended World War I and eliminated the need for more U.S. Navy patrol craft in Europe.

Decommissioned after World War I ended, Sea Hawk remained at Key West, Florida, awaiting final disposition with other section patrol boats until the night of 9–10 September 1919, when she disappeared in the 1919 Florida Keys hurricane and was not recovered.
