= USS War Bug =

Patrol vessel of the United States Navy (1917–1919)

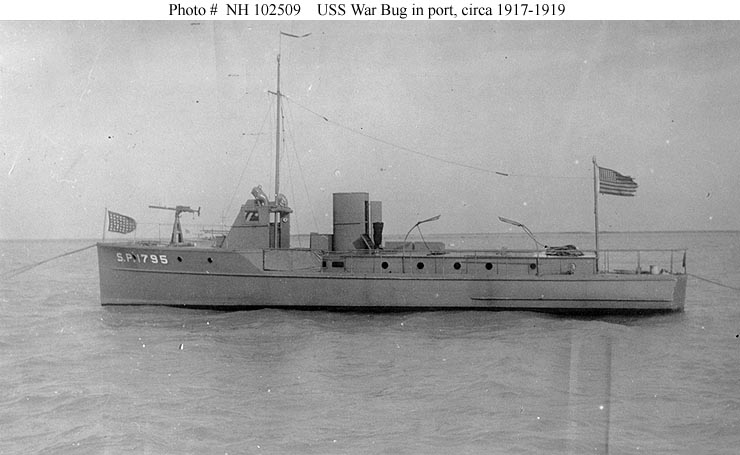
- USS War Bug (SP-1795) between 1917 and 1919

History

United States
- Name: USS War Bug
- Builder: Herreshoff Manufacturing Company, Bristol, Rhode Island
- Completed: 1917
- Acquired: 6 November 1917
- Commissioned: 17 November 1917
- Decommissioned: 28 December 1918
- Fate: Sold 30 June 1919

General characteristics
- Type: Patrol vessel
- Tonnage: 28.89 GRT
- Length: 62 ft 4 in (19.00 m)
- Beam: 10 ft 11 in (3.33 m)
- Draft: 2 ft 9 in (0.84 m) mean
- Speed: 20 knots (37 km/h; 23 mph)
- Complement: 9
- Armament: 1 × 1-pounder gun
- Notes: Built as private motorboat Herreshoff 320

USS War Bug (SP-1795) was a motorboat in commission in the United States Navy as a patrol vessel from 1917 to 1918.

War Bug was built as the wooden-hulled motorboat Herreshoff 320 at Bristol, Rhode Island, in 1917 by the Herreshoff Manufacturing Company for a private owner, and probably was designed with possible naval service in mind. The U.S. Navy purchased Herreshoff 320 from Felix Warburg of New York City on 6 November 1917 for use as a patrol vessel in World War I. Armed and designated SP-1795, she was commissioned as USS War Bug on 17 November 1917.

War Bug was assigned to the 1st Naval District and served in waters near Boston, Massachusetts, through the end of World War I.

Due to an urgent need for craft such as War Bug at Brest, France, an order dated 14 October 1918 went out from Washington, D.C., to Boston directing the Commandant of the 1st Naval District to ready six section patrol boats – USS Commodore (SP-1425), USS Cossack (SP-695), War Bug, USS Sea Hawk (SP-2365), USS Kangaroo (SP-1284), and USS SP-729 – to be shipped to France as deck cargo along with spare parts to keep them operational. However, this proposed movement appears to have been cancelled, probably because of the armistice with Germany of 11 November 1918 that ended World War I and eliminated the need for more U.S. Navy patrol craft in Europe.

Decommissioned on 28 December 1918, War Bug was sold on 30 June 1919 to E. Atkins and Co., of Boston.
