= Edward Burgess (yacht designer) =

American yacht designer (1848–1891)

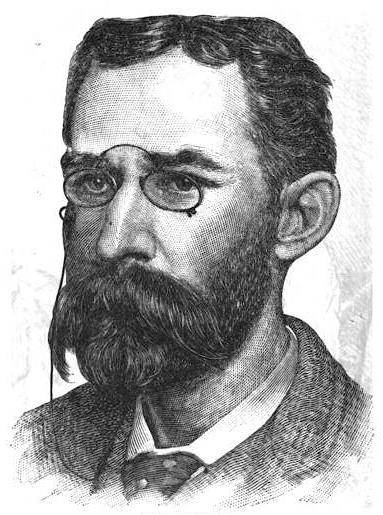
- Born: June 30, 1848; Sandwich, Massachusetts
- Died: July 12, 1891 (aged 43); Boston, Massachusetts
- Resting place: Mount Auburn Cemetery
- Education: Harvard
- Occupations: Naturalist & naval architect
- Spouse: Caroline Louisa (Sullivant) Burgess
- Children: William Starling Burgess, Charles Paine Burgess
- Parents: Benjamin Burgess (father); Cordelia Williams (Ellis) Burgess (mother)
- Relatives: Tasha Tudor (granddaughter)

Edward Burgess (1848–1891) was an American yacht designer. Several of his boats won fame in the waters of the eastern United States, including designing three America's Cup winners.

== Early life and education ==
Edward Burgess was born in West Sandwich, Massachusetts on June 30, 1848, the fifth son of Benjamin Franklin Burgess (1818–1909) and Cordelia Williams Ellis (1821–1876). The Burgess family were merchants who made their money in the West Indies trade and lost it in 1879.

Burgess was educated at Harvard, graduating in 1871, and became secretary of the Boston Society of Natural History, in which capacity he edited the publications of the society, and published several memoirs on anatomical subjects. In 1879, he became instructor in entomology at Harvard, remaining until 1883. He traveled in Europe and, "as an amateur," studied the principles of naval architecture, bringing his knowledge and judgment to the practical test of designing and building vessels for his own use. He relied on this when he turned to the design of sailing yachts for a living in 1883.

== Yacht design ==
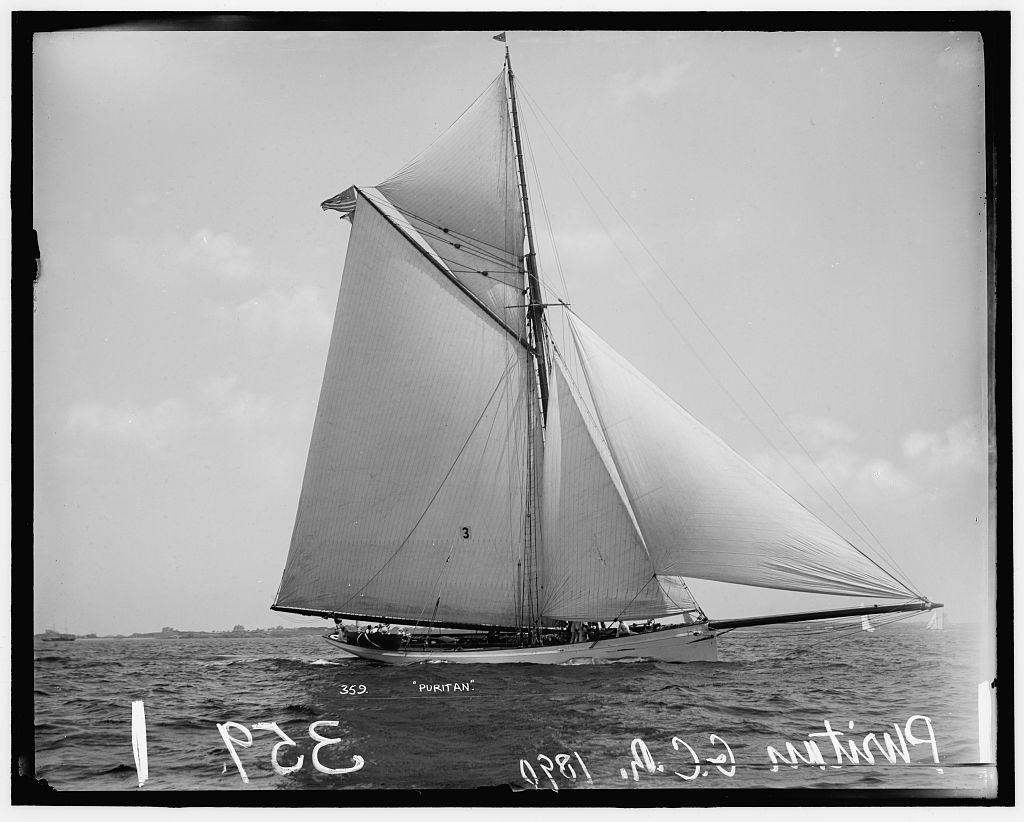
Puritan

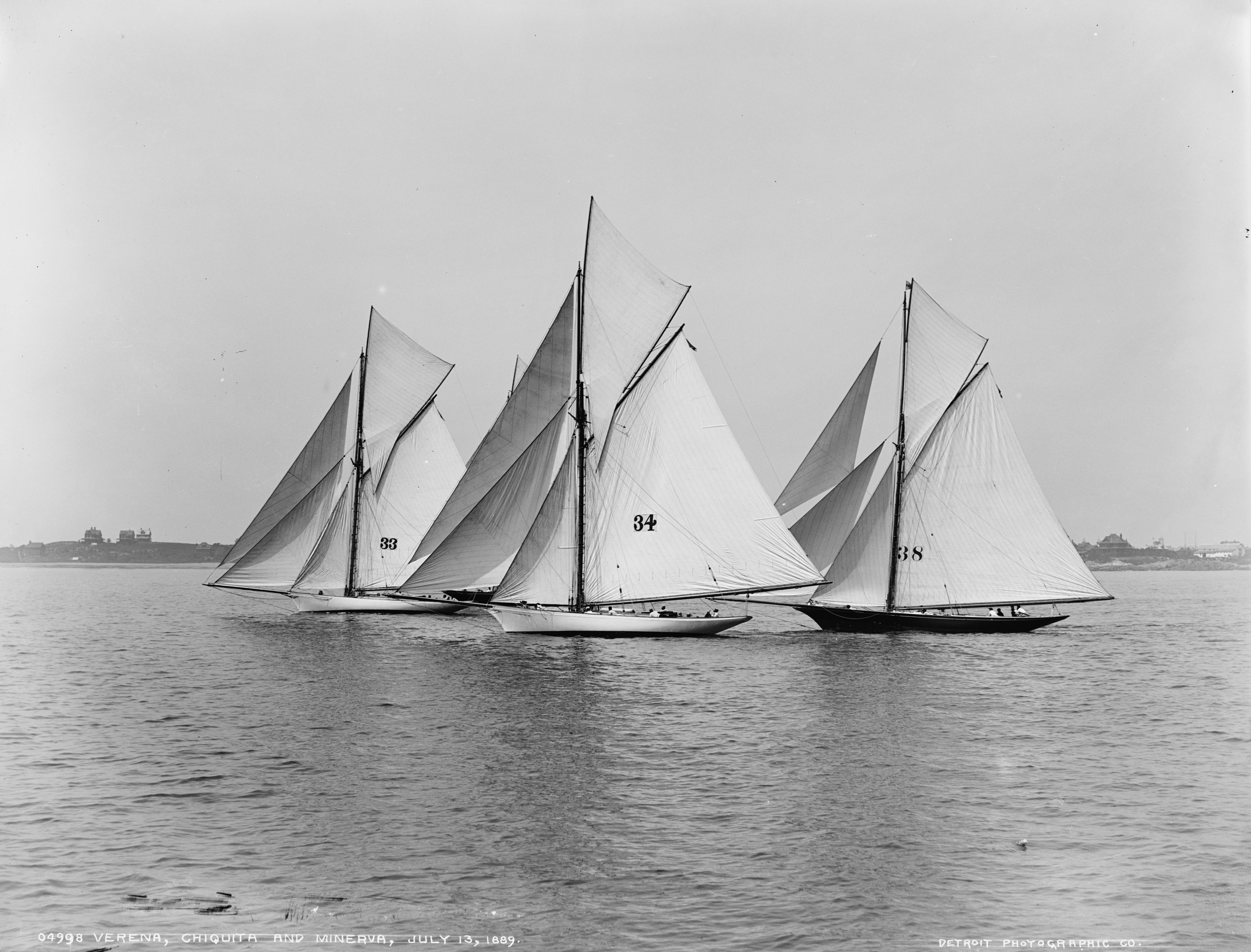
J.A. Beebe's yacht Verena (1889), Augustus Hemenway's yacht Chiquita (1888) (both compromise centreboard sloop designs by Edward Burgess) and Charles H. Tweed's keel cutter Minerva (William Fife design, 1888), pictured in the Hovey Cup, July 13, 1889.

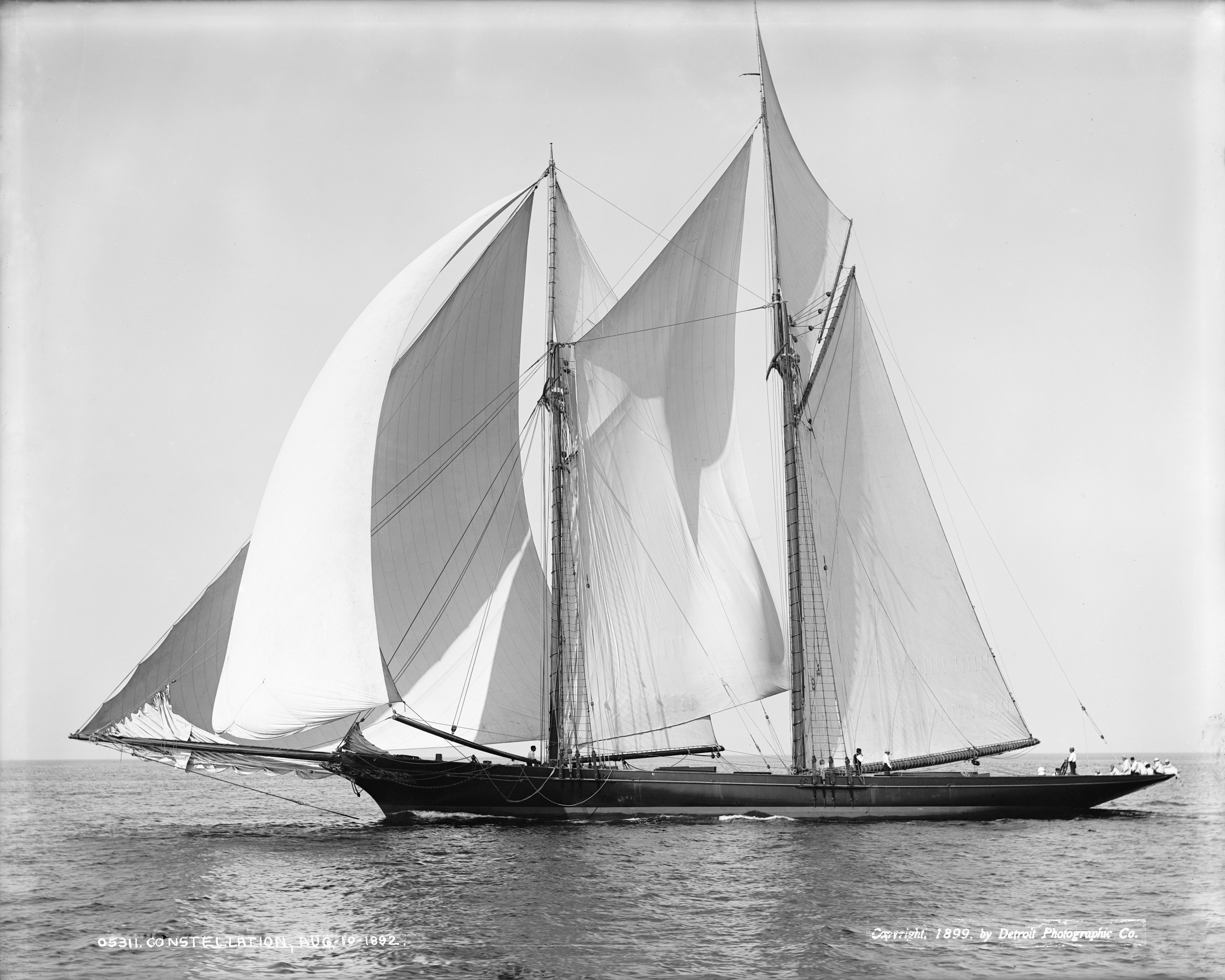
Constellation

The Burgess homestead in Beverly, Mass

Several of his boats won fame in the waters of the eastern United States. He designed Constellation, the largest steel hull schooner at the time, for E.D. Morgan in 1889. In 1884, a committee of Bostonians selected him to design a large sloop yacht to represent the United States in a series of international races. From his designs, Puritan was built; she easily defeated Genesta (English) for the America's Cup in 1885. This was a remarkable triumph as it was the first attempt of an American designer to solve certain shipbuilding problems to which Englishmen had given their attention for a score of years.

In 1886, his Mayflower, slightly larger than Puritan, led in the race with the English Galatea. In 1888, Burgess' fishing schooner Carrie E. Phillips outdistanced four competitors in the fisherman's race held in Boston harbor. His Volunteer won the America's cup against the Thistle in 1887. His other yachts included the Mariquita and Gossoon, both remarkably swift sloops designed to counter the success of the Clyde-built cutter Minerva (William Fife, 1888).

In his seven years of work as a yacht designer, Burgess designed 137 vessels, that included 38 cutters, 35 steam yachts, 29 catboats, 17 sloops, 11 fishing-vessels, 3 pilot-boats, 3 working-vessels, and 1 yawl. His son William Starling Burgess would follow him in his profession of yacht design. Examples of pilot boats Burgess designed were the Varuna and the Adams.

A steam yacht named Melissa designed by Burgess was purchased by actor William H. Crane and renamed The Senator after one of Crane's most popular plays. An image of The Senator passing Minot's Ledge Light features on the label of Cohasset Punch liqueur, which debuted at Crane's residence in the 1890s.

== Personal life ==
Burgess married Caroline Louisa Sullivant on June 2, 1877, in Boston. They had two sons, William Starling Burgess and Charles Paine Burgess. His family had a home in Beverly, Massachusetts near current day Lynch Park.

Burgess died July 12, 1891, of typhoid fever. Caroline died September 16, 1891, in Boston of pneumonia. They are both buried at Mount Auburn Cemetery lot #1167 Geranium Path.

Photograph of Edward Burgess

Burgess was inducted into the America's Cup Hall of Fame in 1994.

== Sources ==
- Reynolds, Francis J., ed. (1921). "Burgess, Edward" . Collier's New Encyclopedia. New York: P. F. Collier & Son Company.Adolphus Gustavus McVey (1892). "Edward Burgess and his work". New England Magazine. Vol. V. pp. 49–62.
- Boston's North Shore by Joseph E.Garland. Published 1978.
- Benjamin Franklin Burgess Obituary, NEHGS Register Volume 65 xlviii, 1911.
- 139.Benjamin Franklin Burgess genealogy.
- Tasha Tudor ancestry.
- Wilson, J. G.; Fiske, J., eds. (1900). "Burgess, Edward" . Appletons' Cyclopædia of American Biography. New York: D. Appleton.
- Reynolds, Francis J., ed. (1921). "Burgess, Edward" . Collier's New Encyclopedia. New York: P. F. Collier & Son Company.
