= USS Daiquiri =

Patrol vessel of the United States Navy

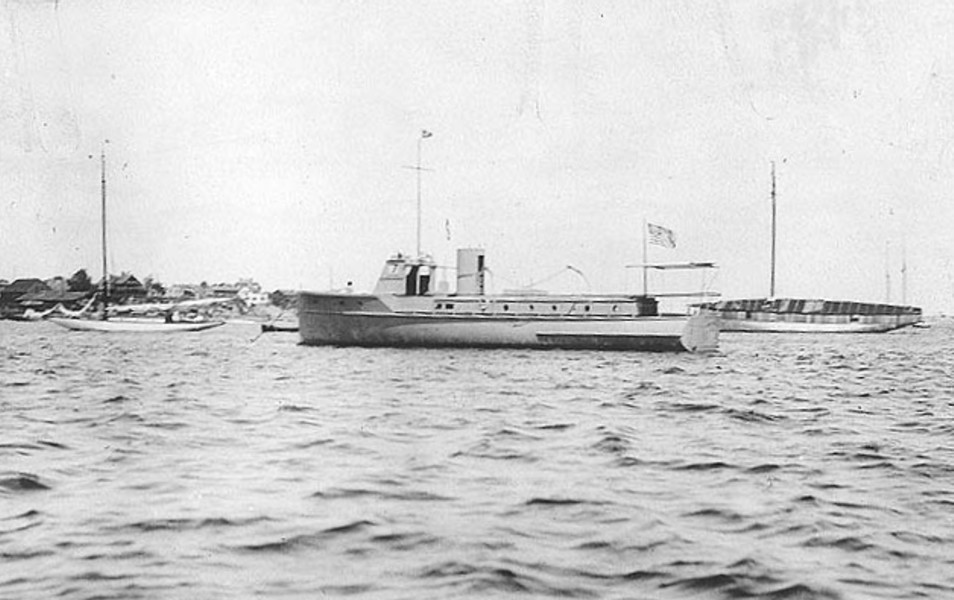
- Daiquiri (American Motor Boat, 1917) anchored in a harbor, prior to her World War I Navy service.

History

United States
- Name: USS Daiquiri
- Namesake: Former name retained by the Navy
- Builder: not known
- Laid down: date unknown
- Launched: date unknown
- Christened: as Herreshoff Hull 317; later renamed Daiquiri
- Completed: in 1917 at Bristol, Rhode Island
- Acquired: 2 October 1917
- In service: 2 October 1917 as USS Daiquiri (SP-1285)
- Out of service: April 1919
- Stricken: 1920 (est.)
- Home port: Kittery, Maine, reporting to the 1st Naval District
- Fate: Sold on 10 March 1920

General characteristics
- Type: Motorboat
- Displacement: not known
- Length: 62 ft 4 in (19.00 m)
- Beam: not known
- Draft: not known
- Propulsion: not known
- Complement: not known
- Armament: not known

USS Daiquiri (SP-1285) was a motorboat – one of a series of identical boats – planned and built by the U.S. Navy in the event they would be needed during World War I. Daiquiri was armed as a patrol craft and assigned to New England waterways under the cognizance of the 1st Naval District based at Kittery, Maine. She was sold when the war ended.

== Constructed in Rhode Island ==
Daiquiri, 62'4" motor boat, was constructed in 1917 at Bristol, Rhode Island, as Herreshoff Hull # 317. She was one of a group of identical craft built in the expectation that they would be needed by the Navy should the United States enter World War I.

== World War I service ==
Purchased by the Navy in mid-September 1917, she was commissioned in early October as USS Daiquiri (SP-1285) and performed patrol service for the 1st Naval District in New England waters for the rest of the conflict.

== Post-war disposition ==
Inactivated in April 1919, the boat was sold in March 1920.
