= USS Snark =

Patrol vessel of the United States Navy

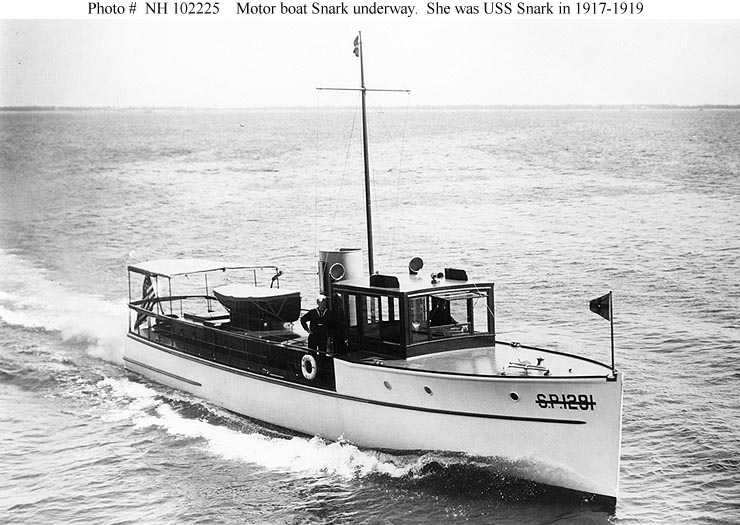
- Snark in private use sometime after her 1919 return to her owner. She has been fitted with an enlarged pilothouse and her U.S. Navy section patrol number (SP-1291) is painted on her bow to commemorate her World War I naval service.

History

United States
- Name: USS Snark
- Namesake: Previous name retained
- Builder: Herreshoff Manufacturing Company, Bristol, Rhode Island
- Completed: 1917
- Acquired: 1917
- Commissioned: 30 August 1917
- Stricken: 29 March 1919
- Fate: Returned to owner 29 March 1919

General characteristics
- Type: Patrol vessel
- Length: 62 ft 4 in (19.00 m)
- Beam: 11 ft 2 in (3.40 m)
- Draft: 1 ft 6 in (0.46 m)
- Speed: 20 knots
- Complement: 9
- Armament: 1 × 1-pounder gun

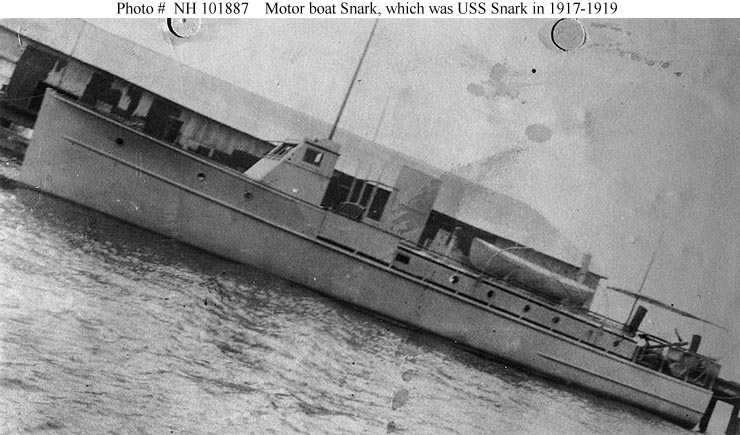
Snark as a private motorboat at the time of her completion in 1917.

USS Snark (SP-1291) was a United States Navy patrol vessel in commission from 1917 to 1919.

Snark was built in 1917 by the Herreshoff Manufacturing Company at Bristol, Rhode Island, as a private motorboat for Carl Tucker of New York City, one of nine 62-foot 4-inch (19-meter) motorboats the company built for private owners specifically for use as patrol boats in time of war. Accordingly, the U.S. Navy acquired Snark under a free lease from Tucker in 1917 for use as a section patrol boat during World War I. She was commissioned as USS Snark (SP-1291) on 30 August 1917.

Assigned to the 5th Naval District, Snark carried out patrol duties for the rest of World War I and until March 1919.

Snark was stricken from the Navy List on 29 March 1919 and was returned to Tucker the same day.
