= National Register of Historic Places listings in Shelter Island (town), New York =

This is a list of the National Register of Historic Places listings on Shelter, New York

This list is intended to provide a comprehensive listing of entries in the National Register of Historic Places in the Town of Shelter Island, New York. The locations of National Register properties for which the latitude and longitude coordinates are included below, may be seen in a Google map.

== Listings ==
	Name on the Register	Image	Date listed	Location	City or town	Description
1	Camp Quinipet	Camp Quinipet	October 5, 2005 (#05001133)	78 Shore Road; 41°04′15″N 72°22′56″W	Shelter Island Heights	
2	James Havens Homestead	James Havens Homestead	April 10, 1986 (#86000701)	NY 114; 41°03′49″N 72°19′53″W	Shelter Island	
3	Manhanset Chapel	Manhanset Chapel	August 29, 1997 (#97000979)	24 North Ferry Road; 41°04′05″N 72°20′10″W	Shelter Island	
4	Shelter Island Country Club	Shelter Island Country Club	February 25, 2009 (#09000058)	26 Sunnyside Avenue; 41°04′39″N 72°21′33″W	Shelter Island	
5	Shelter Island Heights Historic District	Shelter Island Heights Historic District	May 7, 1993 (#93000335)	Roughly bounded by St. Johns Street, Tower Hill Road, Sunnyside Avenue, Meadow Place, Chase Creek, and Dering Harbor; 41°05′04″N 72°21′26″W	Shelter Island Heights	
6	Shelter Island Windmill	Shelter Island Windmill	December 27, 1978 (#78001917)	N of Manwaring Road; 41°04′33″N 72°20′08″W	Shelter Island	
7	Smith–Ransome Japanese Bridge	Smith–Ransome Japanese Bridge	February 2, 2018 (#100002080)	24 Merkel Lane; 41°03′02″N 72°19′09″W	Shelter Island	1905 decorative reinforced concrete bridge designed by Ernest Ransome for Francis Marion Smith's estate makes rare use for Ransome of Japanese-influenced design popular at that time.
8	Smith-Taylor Cabin	Smith-Taylor Cabin	September 28, 2007 (#07001016)	Taylor's Island; 41°04′17″N 72°17′55″W	Shelter Island	On Taylor Island
9	Sylvester Manor	Sylvester Manor	April 28, 2015 (#15000178)	80 N. Ferry Rd. 41°04′49″N 72°20′28″W	Shelter Island	1652 plantation homestead now used as educational farm
10	Union Chapel	Union Chapel	November 23, 1984 (#84000296)	The Grove; 41°05′02″N 72°21′32″W	Shelter Island Heights	

== See also ==
- National Register of Historic Places listings in New York
- National Register of Historic Places listings in Suffolk County, New York
