= Aileen Osofsky =

- Born: Aileen Shirley Bryant; September 6, 1926; Brooklyn, New York, US
- Died: June 22, 2010 (aged 83); New York, New York, US
- Occupations: Community leader, philanthropy, bridge player
- Known for: ACBL Goodwill Committee

Aileen Shirley Osofsky (née Bryant; September 6, 1926 – June 22, 2010) was an American community leader, philanthropist and bridge player. She served as the chairman of the American Contract Bridge League (ACBL) Goodwill Committee for more than 20 years from 1985.

== Early life ==
Aileen Bryant was born in Brooklyn, the third of four children. Her father, Harry Bryant, was an architect and builder whose commission to construct military barracks took the family around the country. With each move, Aileen skipped a grade, graduating from high school at age 15. She met her future husband, Meyer Osofsky, while in Cunningham Junior High School. They married in 1945. Meyer served in the U.S. Army Air Corps during World War II, and then founded "Aileen", a popular women's sportswear line named for his wife.

In 1969, the couple built their dream home and settled in Shelter Island, choosing a plot overlooking Hay Beach. The architect Norman Jaffe designed the house. It is considered one of his most accomplished and is featured in the 2001 book Weekend Utopia: Modern Living in the Hamptons and in the "Romantic Modernist: The Life and Work of Norman Jaffe, Architect" exhibit at the Parrish Art Museum in 2005.

Shortly after the Osofskys moved into their new home, Aileen began to participate in the community by offering the use of her home for a Shelter Island House Tour and her tennis court for local tennis tournaments. She was a steadfast supporter of the Friends of Music, the Perlman Music Program, the police and fire departments and the Red Cross ambulance corps. When Aileen won thousands of dollars as the major prize winner at the Fire Department's Chicken Barbecue, she donated it all back to the community. With her husband and daughter, Aileen donated the Manhanset Chapel (also known as Mechanic's Hall) to the Shelter Island Historical Society.

== American Contract Bridge League ==
Osofsky was asked to chair the ACBL Goodwill Committee in 1985 even though she was not a member of the committee. She had made a name for herself with the Greater New York Bridge Association and is one of only three life members of that organization. Aileen quickly took to the job and expanded the organization's goodwill efforts by extolling the use of bidding boxes to facilitate play for the hard of hearing, working to include youth players, and promoting "active ethics" to improve the quality of player conduct.

Osofsky was inducted into the ACBL Hall of Fame in 2009 as a recipient of the Blackwood Award for individual contributions to bridge without necessarily being a great player. At the induction ceremony, her son Alan noted, "Although she isn't the best player, she has done as much for the game as anyone."

In her 25 years of service as Goodwill chair, Osofsky never stopped trying to convince ACBL members that friendly demeanor at the bridge table is good for everyone. A few days prior to her death, in a letter to the ACBL, Osofsky reflected on her long association with the organization:

When I got a call twenty-five years ago asking me to become the chair of the National Goodwill Committee, I had no idea how profound and positive an impact the organization and its members would have on my life.

As I transition now to a less involved role in the activities of the ACBL, I must acknowledge the paramount part that the organization has played in filling my life with joy, passion, and meaning — and I must thank you all from the bottom of my heart for giving me the opportunity to participate in the group’s work, and for doing that work with me.

In 2012 the ACBL named Osofsky and Barbara Seagram as being joint holders of number 40 of the 52 most influential personalities in the organization's history for their work at promoting friendly behavior at the bridge table.

== Other organizations ==
Osofsky split her time between New York and Phoenix. While in Phoenix, she served on the boards of many Jewish organizations, including the Women's Philanthropy Board of the Jewish Federation of Greater Phoenix, Jewish Community Foundation and Brandeis University National Women's Committee.

Osofsky founded Shelter Without Walls, a Jewish Family and Children's Service program that helps transform the lives of domestic violence victims in 1998, with the help of others in the community. The Jewish Federation of Greater Phoenix, Women's Philanthropy Division, gave Osofsky in 2006 the Gerda Weissmann Klein and Kurt Klein Award for contributing 10 or more years of service to both the Jewish and general communities.

In 1991, Aileen and Meyer co-funded an airplane transfer of Russian Jewish refugees to Israel.

== Death ==
Osofsky died of complications from leukemia at New York University Medical Center on June 22, 2010, at the age of 83. She is survived by her husband, Meyer "Mike" Osofsky; son Alan and daughter-in-law Deirdre; son Larry and daughter-in-law Audrey; daughter Randy and son-in-law Steve Kessler; 10 grandchildren and three great-grandchildren.

== Legacy ==
During the ACBL Goodwill Committee reception at the Summer 2010 North American Bridge Championships in New Orleans, ACBL President Rich DeMartino announced that the committee was renamed the Aileen Osofsky ACBL Goodwill Committee in her honor.

Shortly thereafter, during the Desert Empire Regional Tournament held in Scottsdale, Arizona, the players of Unit 354, the Phoenix, Arizona area, designated August 11, 2010, as Aileen Osofsky Goodwill Day. $275 in donations for the ACBL Foundation for the Preservation and Advancement of Bridge were raised in her honor. "Those donations represent a token of appreciation to recognize what Aileen did to support good ethics and manners, thereby enriching the game," said Unit 354 President Janet Newman.
