= Smith-Taylor Cabin =

Historic house in New York, United States

- U.S. National Register of Historic Places
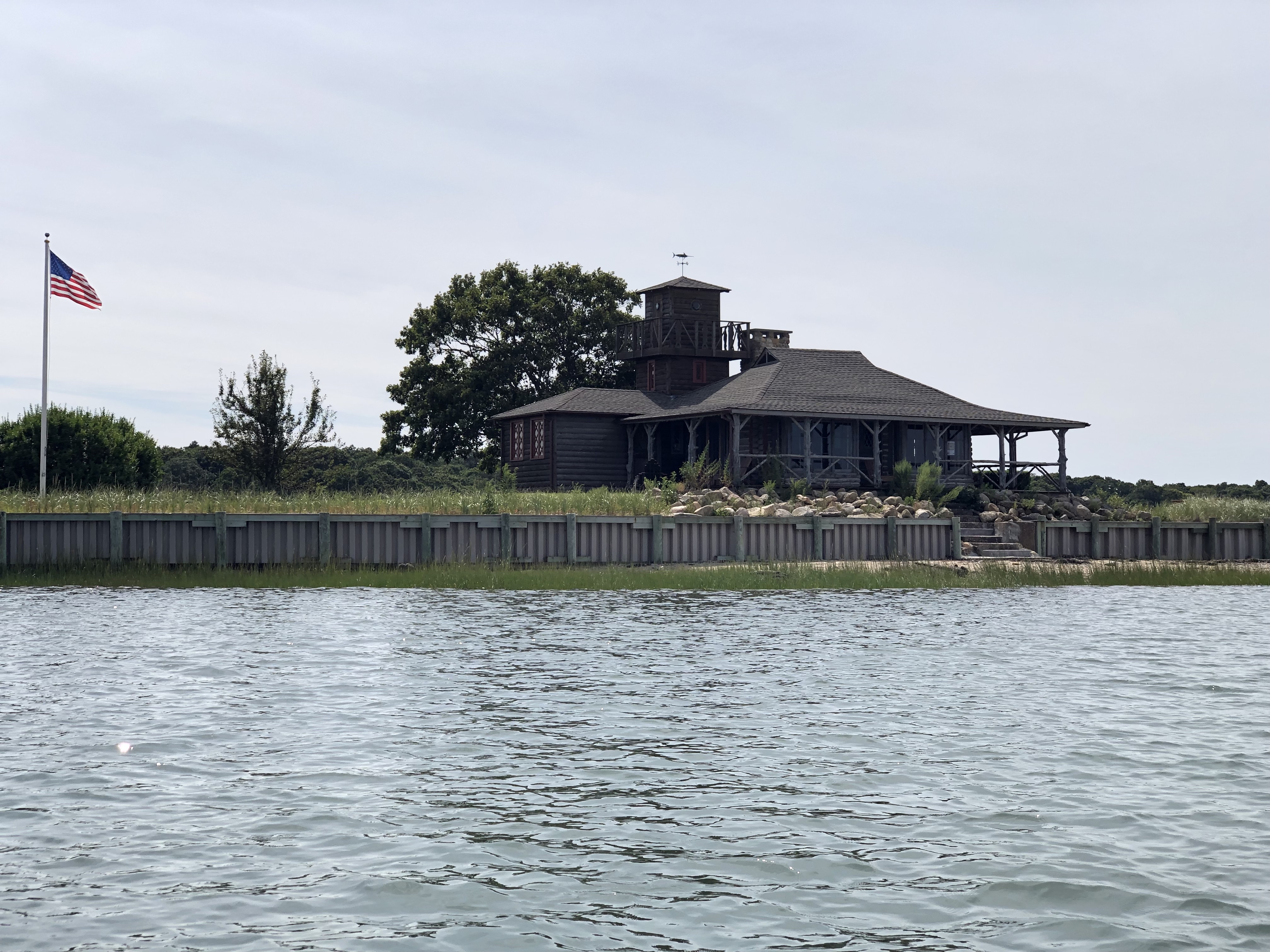
- Taylor Island on Shelter Island, October 2008

- Location within New York Location within the United States
- Location: Taylor's Island, Shelter Island, New York
- Coordinates: 41°4′17″N 72°17′55″W
- Area: less than one acre
- Built: 1937
- Architectural style: Adirondack log cabin
- NRHP reference No.: 07001016
- Added to NRHP: September 28, 2007

Smith-Taylor Cabin is an historic Adirondack style log cabin located in Coecles Harbor on Taylor's Island (Cedar Island) at Shelter Island in Suffolk County, New York. The original cabin was built around 1900 by Francis Marion Smith of "20 Mule Team Borax" fame. In 1937 S. Gregory Taylor (Soterios Gregorios Tavoulares) added a bedroom, bathroom, kitchen, foyer, and landmark tower with catwalk.

It was added to the New York State and National Register of Historic Places in 2007.
