= Dering Harbor, New York =

- Village
- Incorporated Village of Dering Harbor
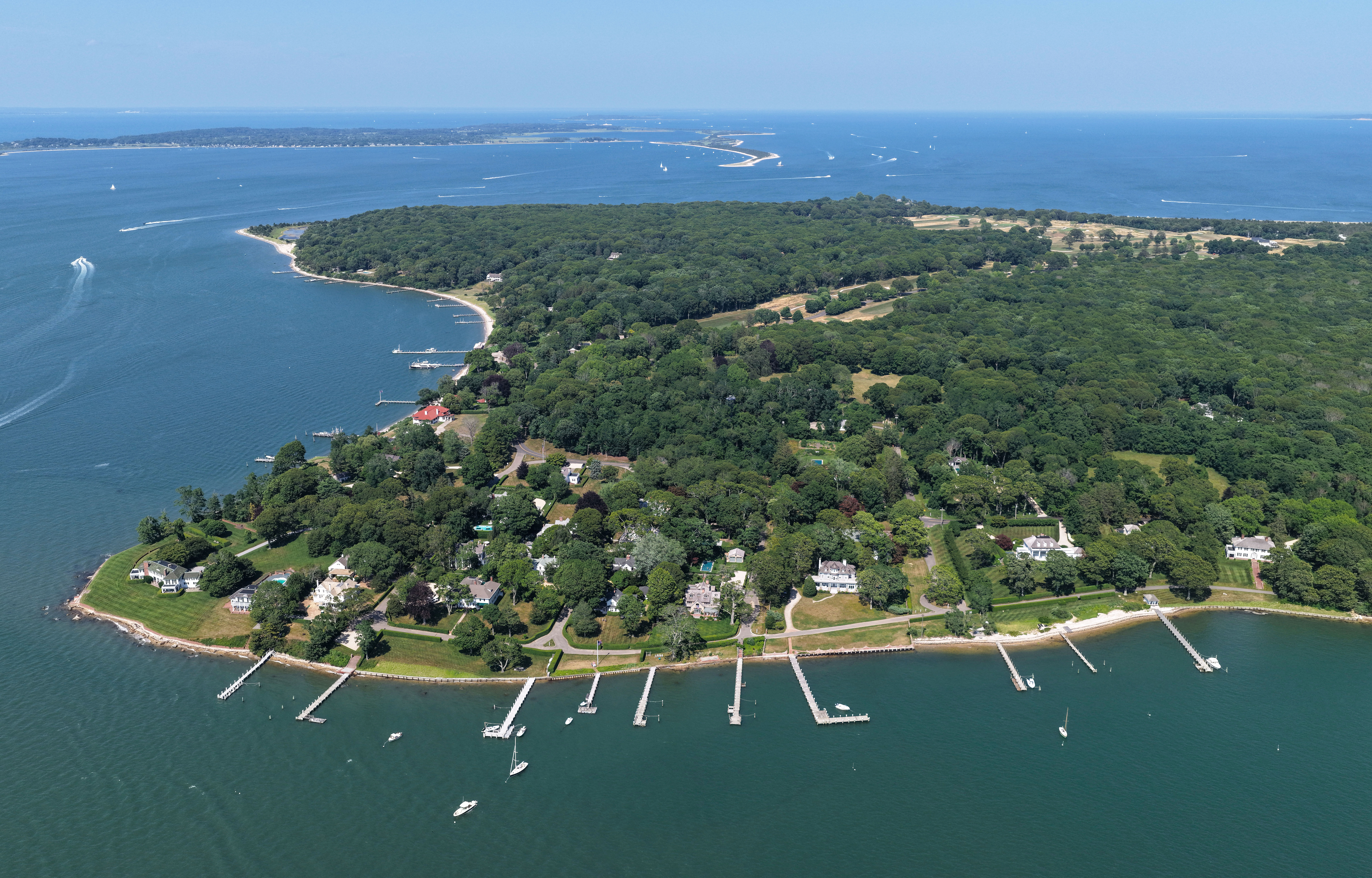
- Aerial view of Dering Harbor

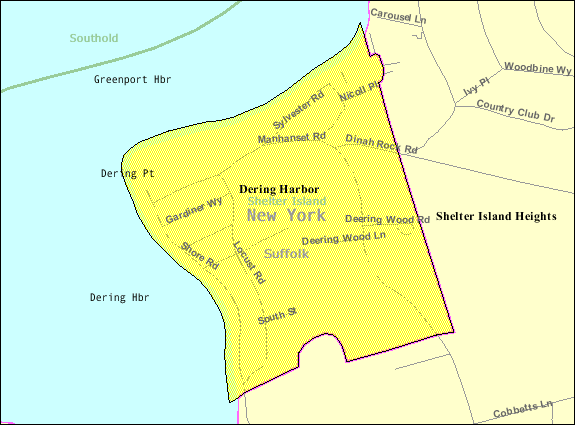
- U.S. Census map of Dering Harbor.

- Location within Suffolk County and the state of New York.

- Location within the state of New York
- Coordinates: 41°5′35″N 72°20′43″W
- Country: United States
- State: New York
- County: Suffolk
- Town: Shelter Island
- Incorporated: 1916

Government
  - Mayor: Ari J. Benacerraf
  - Deputy Mayor: Samuel M. Ashner

Area
  - Total: 0.26 sq mi (0.67 km^{2})
  - Land: 0.25 sq mi (0.64 km^{2})
  - Water: 0.012 sq mi (0.03 km^{2})
- Elevation: 6.6 ft (2 m)

Population (2020)
  - Total: 50
  - Density: 203.5/sq mi (78.59/km^{2})
- Time zone: UTC-5 (Eastern (EST))
  - Summer (DST): UTC-4 (EDT)
- ZIP Code: 11965
- Area codes: 631, 934
- FIPS code: 36-20379
- GNIS feature ID: 0948345
- Website: deringharborvillage.org

Dering Harbor is a village located within the Town of Shelter Island, in Suffolk County, New York, United States. The population was 50 at the time of the 2020 census, making it the least populous village in the State of New York.

The Incorporated Village of Dering Harbor is located on the northern side of Shelter Island, east of the hamlet of Shelter Island Heights.

== History ==
Dering Harbor incorporated as a village in 1916. It had been a popular resort community since the 19th Century. According to The New York Times, it is rumored that the village decided to incorporate as a means of preventing "Coney Island-style concessions" from popping up in the area.

== Geography ==
According to the United States Census Bureau, the village has a total area of 0.2 square miles (0.52 km^{2}), of which 0.2 square miles (0.52 km^{2}) is land and 4.00% is water.

== Demographics ==
Historical population
Census	Pop.	Note	%±
1920	3		—
1930	39		1,200.0%
1940	34		−12.8%
1950	4		−88.2%
1960	19		375.0%
1970	24		26.3%
1980	16		−33.3%
1990	28		75.0%
2000	13		−53.6%
2010	11		−15.4%
2020	50		354.5%
U.S. Decennial Census

At the 2000 census there were 13 people, 6 households, and 3 families in the village. The population density was 54.1 inhabitants per square mile (20.9/km^{2}). There were 32 housing units at an average density of 133.2 per square mile (51.4/km^{2}). The racial makeup of the village was 92% White and 8% Native American. Of the 6 households 17% had children under the age of 18 living with them, 50% were married couples living together, and 50% were non-families. 33% of households were one person and 17% were one person aged 65 or older. The average household size was 2.17 and the average family size was 3.00.

The age distribution was 15% under the age of 18, 23% from 18 to 24, 8% from 25 to 44, 31% from 45 to 64, and 23% 65 or older. The median age was 46 years. For every 100 females, there were 116.7 males. For every 100 females age 18 and over, there were 120.0 males.

The median household income was $33,750 and the median family income was $98,750. Males had a median income of $36,250 versus $0 for females. The per capita income for the village was $43,185. Nobody in the village was below the poverty line.

The village is the smallest in New York state, in terms of total population.

== Government ==
As of July 2024, the Mayor of Dering Harbor is Ari J. Benacerraf, the Deputy Mayor is Samuel M. Ashner, and the Village Trustees are Karen Kelsey, Eric Deutsch, Tom Kusner.

In the 2024 U.S. presidential election, the majority of Dering Harbor voters voted for Kamala D. Harris (D).

== Education ==
=== School district ===
The Village of Dering Harbor is located entirely within the boundaries of the Shelter Island Union Free School District. As such, all children who reside within Dering Harbor and attend public schools go to Shelter Island's schools.

=== Library district ===
Dering Harbor is located within the boundaries of the Shelter Island Public Library District.

== See also ==
- List of municipalities in New York
- South Floral Park, New York
