= Alvord Lake Bridge =

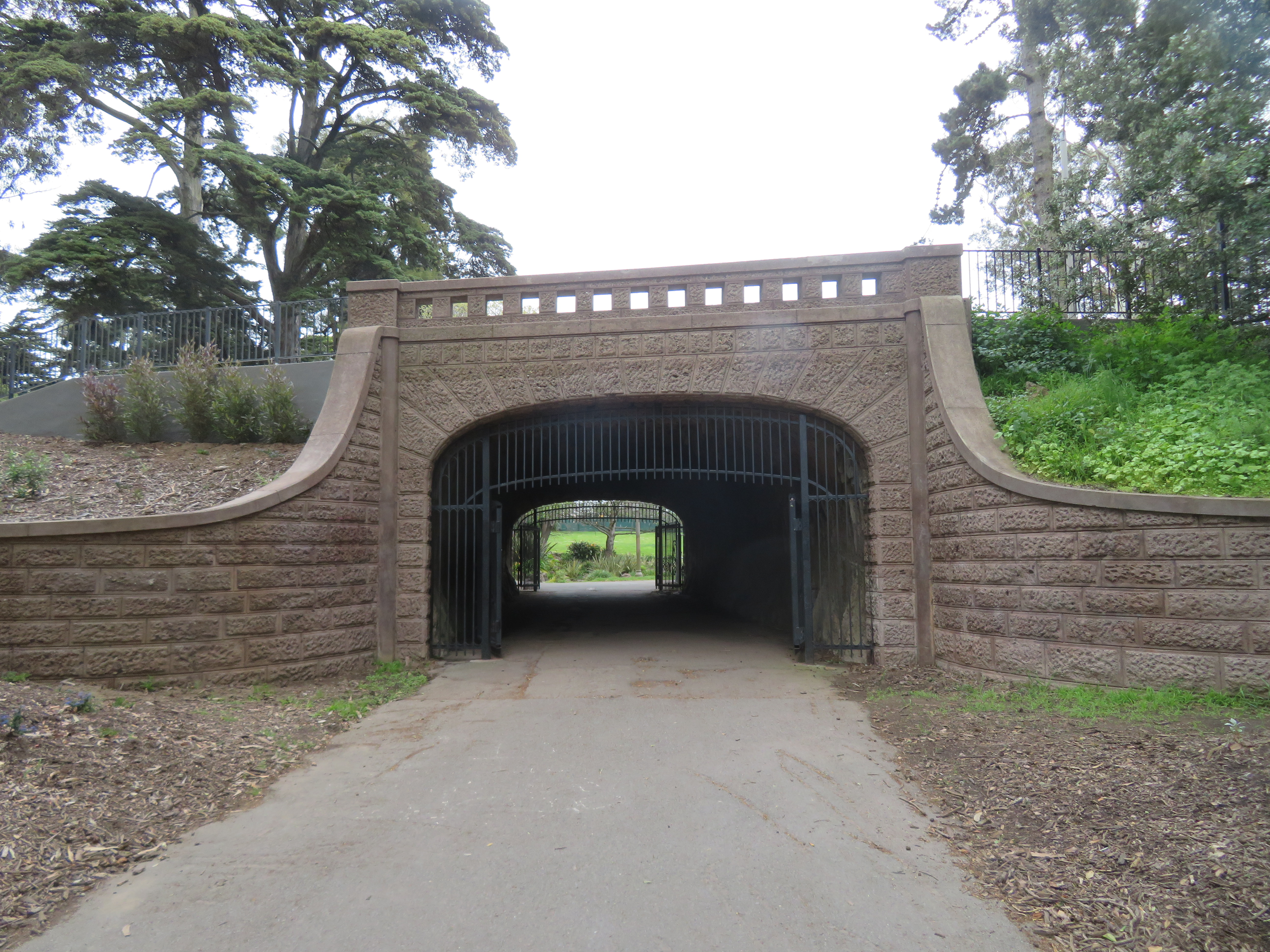
- A view of the Alvord Lake Bridge looking toward the east
- Coordinates: 37.7690°N 122.4549°W
- Carries: 3 lanes of Kezar Drive
- Crosses: Pedestrian entrance to Golden Gate Park
- Locale: San Francisco
- Official name: Alvord Lake Bridge
- Heritage status: American Society of Civil Engineers civil engineering landmark

Characteristics
- Material: Reinforced concrete
- Width: 64 ft (20 m)
- Longest span: 20 ft (6.1 m)
- No. of spans: 1

History
- Designer: Ernest L. Ransome
- Opened: 1889

Location
- Interactive map of Alvord Lake Bridge

The Alvord Lake Bridge was the first reinforced concrete bridge built in America. It was built in 1889 by Ernest L. Ransome, an innovator in reinforced concrete design, mixing equipment, and construction systems. The bridge was constructed as a single arch 64 feet (20 m) wide with a 20-foot (6.1 m) span.

Ransome is believed to have used his patented cold-twisted square steel bar for reinforcement, placed longitudinally in the arch and curved in the same arc. The face of the bridge was scored and hammered to resemble sandstone and the interior features sculpted concrete "stalactites" created during the initial construction to give the bridge underpass a faux cave-like appearance.

E. L. Ransome left San Francisco a few years later, frustrated and bitter at the building community's indifference to concrete construction. Ironically, the city's few reinforced concrete structures, including the Alvord Lake Bridge, survived the 1906 earthquake and fire in remarkable shape, vindicating Ransome's faith in the method. The bridge was designated a historic civil engineering landmark by the American Society of Civil Engineers in 1969.

The Alvord Lake Bridge, which arches over a pedestrian walkway near the lake in San Francisco's Golden Gate Park, allows visitors coming from the Haight Ashbury District and entering the park from the east at Stanyan Street to access the rest of the park safely and directly by providing a grade-separated crossing underneath the busy Kezar Drive.

== See also ==
- List of bridges documented by the Historic American Engineering Record in California
- Smith-Ransome Japanese Bridge
- Fernbridge – longest poured reinforced concrete bridge in the world
