= Shelter Island Country Club =

- U.S. National Register of Historic Places
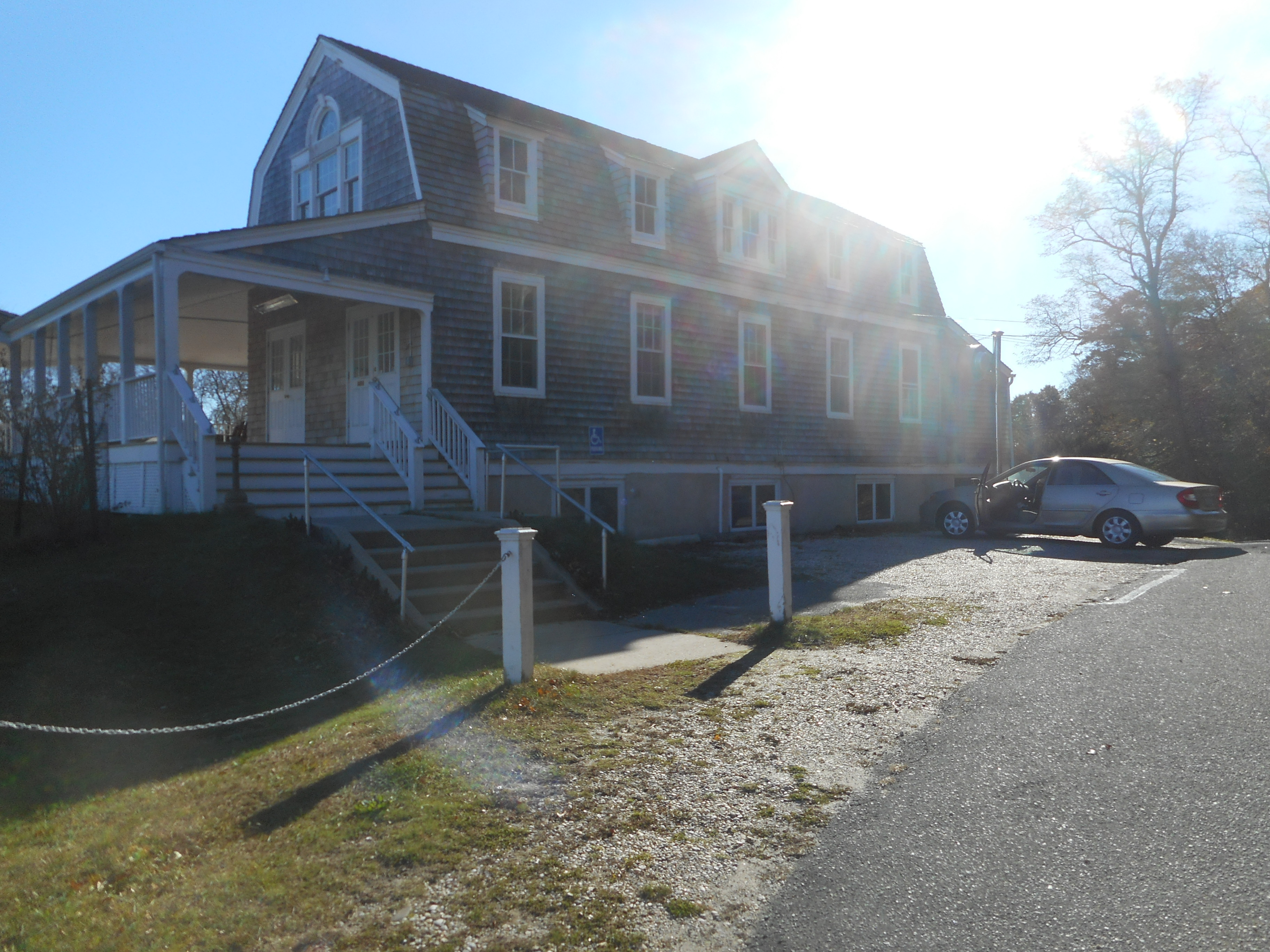
- The Shelter Island Country Club's Flying Goat Restaurant on a November afternoon in 2017.

- Location within New York Location within the United States
- Location: 26 Sunnyside Avenue, Shelter Island, New York
- Coordinates: 41°4′39.03″N 72°21′33″W
- Area: 42.2 acres (17.1 ha)
- Built: 1942
- Architect: Corwin, Charles H.; Bateman, C.H. & Wesley Smith
- Architectural style: Colonial Revival
- NRHP reference No.: 09000058
- Added to NRHP: February 25, 2009

Shelter Island Country Club is a historic country club located at Shelter Island in Suffolk County, New York. The club was established in 1901 and consists of a nine-hole golf course, club house, driving range, and maintenance facility. The club house is a two-story Colonial Revival-style wood-frame building with a side-gabled gambrel roof with five dormer windows on both the east and west elevations. It features a full-length front porch on the east and north sides.

It was added to the National Register of Historic Places in 2009.
