= Union Chapel (Shelter Island Heights, New York) =

- U.S. National Register of Historic Places
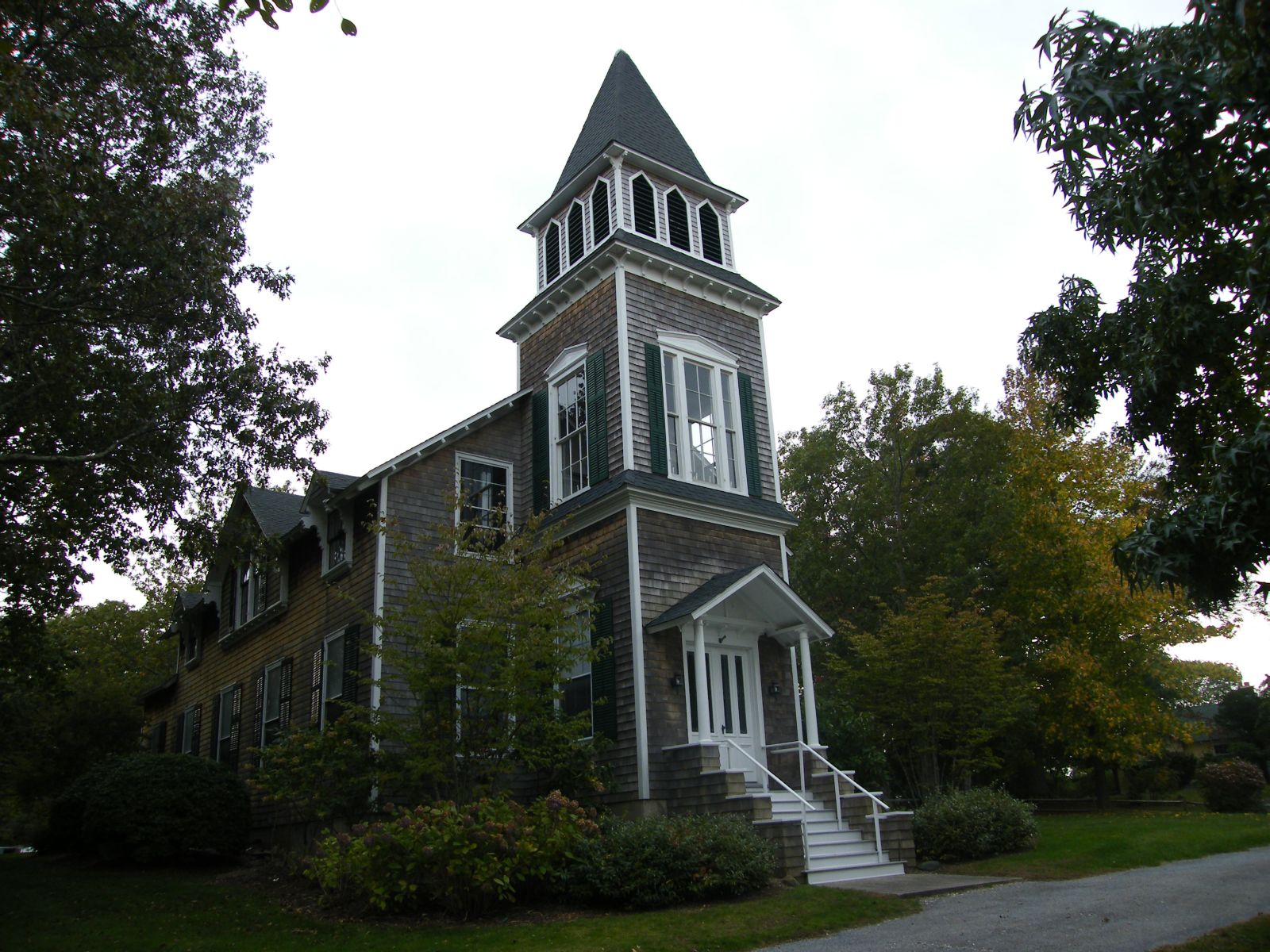

- Location within New York Location within the United States
- Location: The Grove, Shelter Island Heights, New York
- Coordinates: 41°5′2″N 72°21′32″W
- Area: 1.3 acres (0.53 ha)
- Built: 1875
- NRHP reference No.: 84000296
- Added to NRHP: November 23, 1984

Union Chapel is a historic Methodist chapel located in Shelter Island Heights, Suffolk County, New York. It was built in 1875 and is a wood-frame structure with wood-shingle sheathing. The chapel's main three-bay facade has a 2 1/2-story bell tower with a double-door center entrance at its base; a small porch shelters the entry. It is the most important extant structure associated with the Shelter Island Heights Grove and Camp Meeting Association, a Methodist camp established in 1872.

It was added to the National Register of Historic Places in 1984.
