= Frederick Ransome =

Frederick Ransome (1818–1893) was a British inventor and industrialist, creator of Ransome's artificial stone.

Frederick was the son of James Ransome, 1782–1849, a member of the Ransomes steel and agricultural equipment-making family of Ipswich.

In 1844 Frederick invented an artificial sandstone, using sand and powdered flint in an alkaline solution. By heating it in an enclosed high temperature steam boiler the siliceous particles were bound together and could be moulded or worked. With properties equivalent to natural stone, it found applications as filtering slabs, vases, tombstones, decorative architectural work, emery wheels and grindstones. Ransome founded the Patent Siliceous Stone Company in 1852 in order to produce and sell the stone, with an illustrious group of backers that included Charles Darwin, and the Patent Concrete Stone Company in 1865. However, the stone fell out of use, in favour of Portland cement-based concrete, which could be more simply cast on-site.

Ransome moved the manufacture of the artificial stone from Ipswich to Blackwall Lane, Greenwich, in 1866. The Blackwall Lane works covered about four acres, connected to a jetty on the Thames by a tramway.

The company's decorative "stonework" was used at the Brighton Aquarium, London Docks, the Indian Court, Whitehall, St. Thomas's Hospital, and at the University of Calcutta and other buildings in India. They also made paving tiles, which were used on the Albert Bridge and inscribed memorial headstones.

By far his most economically important invention (Patents 5442/1885, 10530/1887 and 15065/1887) was the rotary cement kiln. Although his experiments with the idea were not a commercial success, his designs provided the basis for successful kilns in the US from 1891, subsequently emulated worldwide.

Ransome became an associate of the Institution of Civil Engineers in 1848. He died at East Dulwich on 19 April 1893 and was buried at West Norwood Cemetery. His son, Ernest L. Ransome, born in 1844, moved to the United States and became a significant innovator in his own right, in the development of reinforced concrete.
