= Perlman Music Program =

Non-profit organization in the USA

Coordinates: 41°04′15.1″N 72°22′20.4″W

The Perlman Music Program is a summer program for gifted young musicians. Founded by Toby Perlman, wife of Israeli-American violinist Itzhak Perlman, in 1995, the program is headquartered in Shelter Island, New York. It offers exceptionally talented young string players, aged 12 to 18, a seven-week summer residential courses in solo performance, chamber music, string orchestra and chorus singing, with a faculty led by Itzhak Perlman. In addition to the summer program, students receive year-round mentoring and participate in international studies and performance tours.

== Summer Music School ==
The Summer Music School, an intensive seven-week summer residency at Shelter Island, serves approximately 37 of the world's most exceptionally gifted students, ages 12 to 18, drawn from all over the world. Led by Toby and Itzhak Perlman, the SMS faculty and staff work to create an environment where young musicians feel welcome and supported, where musical talent is nurtured in a rigorous yet noncompetitive fashion, and where concern for the development of the whole person is always foremost at hand. This is accomplished, in part, by maintaining a student-to-faculty ratio of better than 2 to 1. Students typically practice 4 hours every morning and attend rehearsals, coachings, and master classes in the afternoons.

Throughout the duration of the summer program, students and teachers perform in Works In Progress concerts which are free to the public on site. Orchestra/chorus rehearsals and the annual Family Concert are also open to the public. The Annual Summer Benefit takes place at the end of the summer program at Shelter Island.

Seats in the program become available to new students every year when older students reach 18 years of age and leave the program. Hundreds of prospective students apply to the program by submitting an application form which includes a VHS tape or a DVD of their performance, often with hundreds applying for a single spot. Applications are reviewed by faculty members on musical abilities only. Qualified students who are not able to attend without financial assistance are given scholarships.

== The Chamber Music Workshop ==
In 2003, the Perlman Music Program (PMP) added a two-week Chamber Music Workshop to its summer program. This workshop is designed for gifted musicians between the ages of 18 and 30. The workshop accepts both solo musicians and musicians with pre-formed groups. All applicants must submit either a tape or a DVD of their performance for the rigorous selection process. The evening master classes are open to the public, and members of the workshop give open concerts throughout the duration of the program.
