= James Havens Homestead =

Historic house in New York, United States

- U.S. National Register of Historic Places
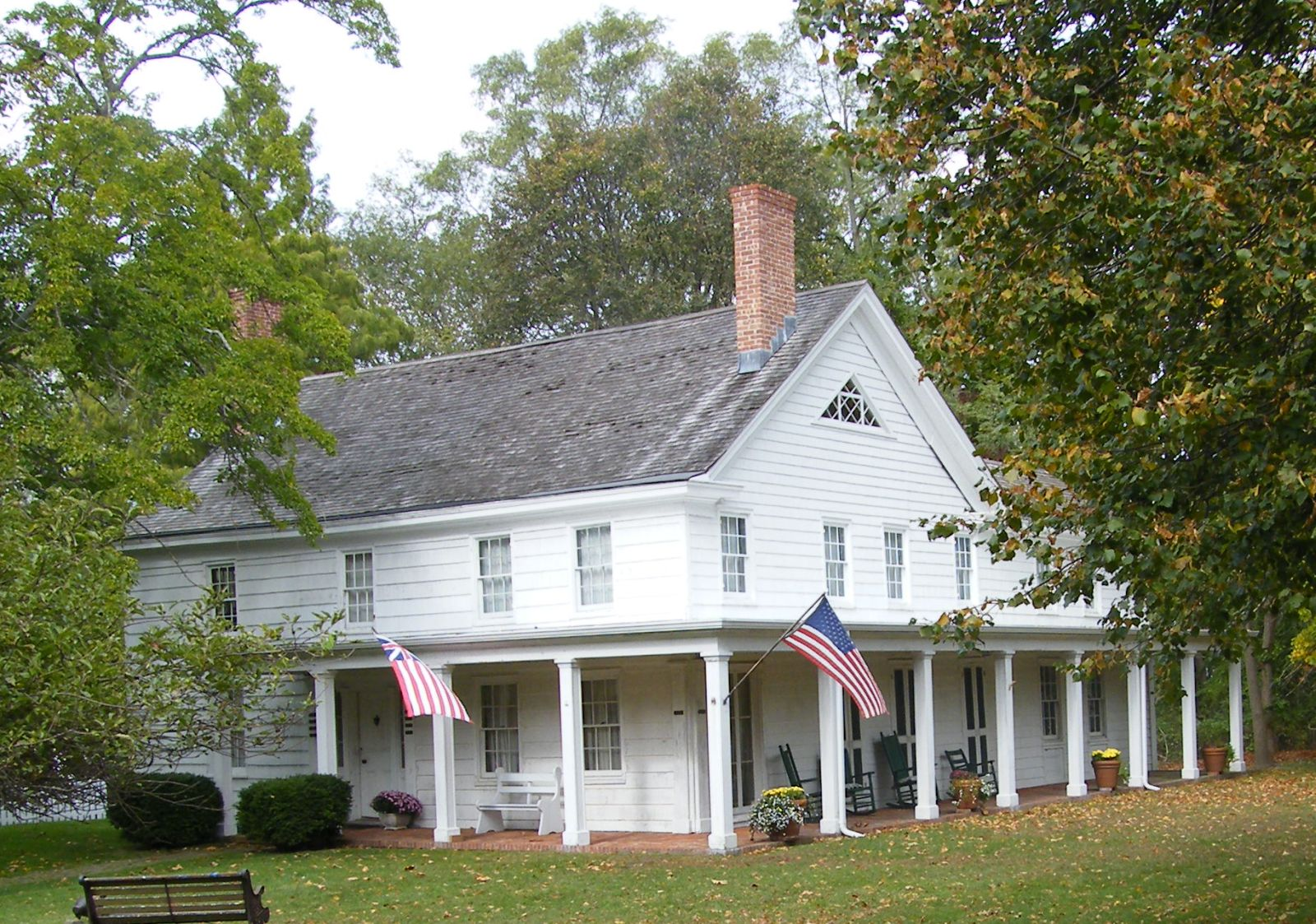
- James Havens Homestead, October 2008

- Location within New York Location within the United States
- Location: NY 114, Shelter Island, New York
- Coordinates: 41°3′49″N 72°19′53″W
- Area: 2 acres (0.81 ha)
- Built: 1743
- NRHP reference No.: 86000701
- Added to NRHP: April 10, 1986

James Havens Homestead is a historic home located at Shelter Island in Suffolk County, New York. The house was built in 1743 and expanded in the early- mid-19th century. It is a large wood-frame building with wood-shingle sheathing, broad gable roof, wraparound porch, and rear wings. The main section includes a two-story, three-bay side-entrance-hall dwelling which was enlarged to four bays with a wide two-story, one-bay addition. Also on the property is a small wood-frame shed.

It was added to the National Register of Historic Places in 1986.

The house is owned by the Shelter Island Historical Society and operated as a historic house museum.
