= Smith-Ransome Japanese Bridge =

Historic bridge on Long Island, New York, U.S.

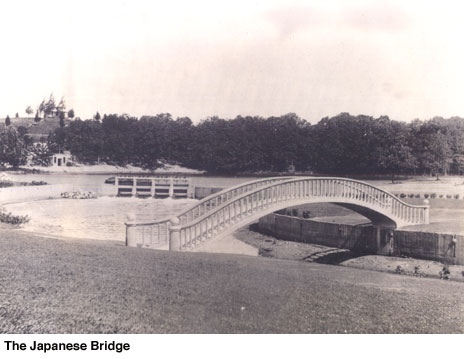
- A view of the Japanese Bridge looking toward the east
- Coordinates: 41.050456°N 72.319041°W
- Crosses: Pedestrian crossover from house grounds to Smiths Pond
- Locale: South Ferry Hills, Shelter Island, New York
- Heritage status: NRHP landmark

Characteristics
- Material: Reinforced concrete
- Width: 6 ft (1.8 m)
- Longest span: 60ft
- No. of spans: 1

History
- Designer: Ernest L. Ransome
- Opened: 1900
- Smith-Ransome Japanese Bridge
- U.S. National Register of Historic Places
- Location within New York Location within the United States
- Location: 24 Merkel Lane, Shelter Island, New York
- Coordinates: 41.05063°N 72.3193°W
- NRHP reference No.: 100002080
- Added to NRHP: February 2, 2018

Location
- Interactive map of Smith-Ransome Japanese Bridge

The Smith-Ransome Japanese Bridge of South Ferry Hills on Shelter Island, New York is one of the first 'reinforced concrete construction' structures built in North America by engineer Ernest L. Ransome for the mineral prospector known as the "Borax King", Francis Marion Smith. Installed in the late 19th century at Smith's East Coast estate, 'Presdeleau', it is an example of ferro-concrete construction enabling an elegant design of what was a popular early 20th century period piece, the Japanese style bridge. It is listed on the New York State and National Register of Historic Places as a significant historical landmark and one of the last surviving two by Ernest Ransome.

== Early history ==
Presdeleau was one of Francis Smith's mansions away from his main estate in Oakland, California called Arbor Villa. Between 1895 and 1898 he also commissioned Ransome to build at the estate in New York a Japanese style bridge and seawall similar to the two underpass bridges that he had already constructed out west. These were two small underpass bridges built by Ransome in the 1880s in the Golden Gate Park, San Francisco, one of which survives to this day. They are the first reinforced concrete bridges in North America, and among the first three or four in the world. In 1897 he completed the Pacific Coast Borax Refinery in Bayonne, New Jersey and Smith had him work on the 60 foot x 6 feet wide bridge at Presdeleau. The architect would achieve fame for the east coast refinery building after it caught fire in 1902 and the concrete framed industrial architecture was shown to have a key superiority over competing steel and iron framed structures, as the buildings frame was only slightly damaged. Ransome's two other buildings that used the same experimental style at Stanford University survived the 1906 San Francisco earthquake essentially without damage while surrounding buildings crumbled.

== Conservancy ==
One hundred years later the estate at Presdeleau had been apportioned and sold in smaller parcels, leaving the Japanese bridge in need of restoration. The Smith-Ransome Japanese Bridge Conservancy was created in 2015 to support the preservation and maintenance of the concrete bridge and associated sea wall which is set in a lagoon that is in current use as a boat basin called Smiths Pond. The small bridge is just behind the beach at Smith Cove on the Peconic River and it looks out at the upper Sag Harbor bay from South Ferry hills. In 2017 it was nominated to the state historic register and in 2018 it was placed on the NRHP as significant for the type of construction and its significance to the history of Shelter Island.

== Gallery ==
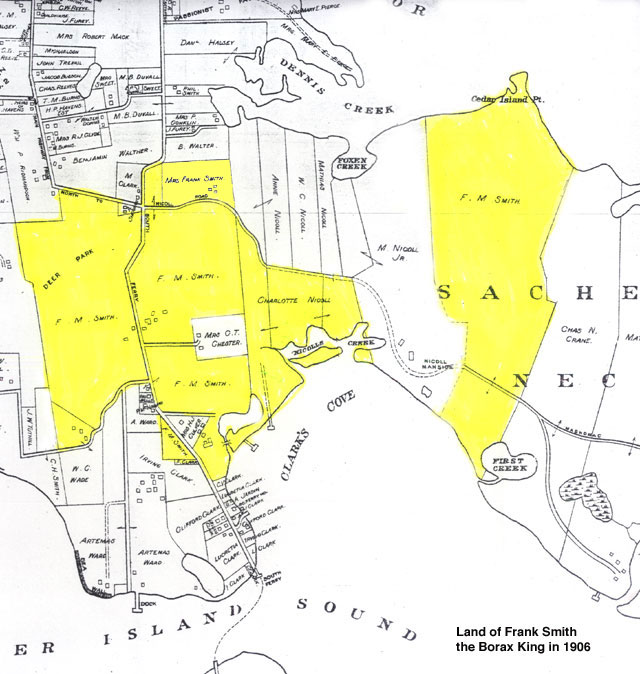
Map of shelter island in 1906, lands owned by Francis Smith

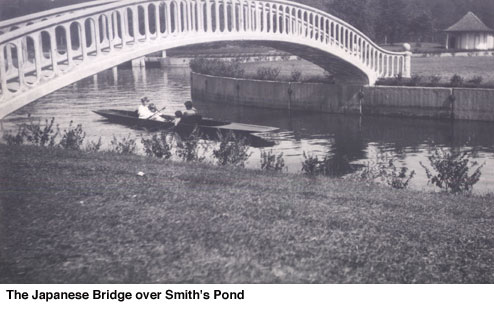
Single arch 60 ft (18 m) span Smith-Ransome Japanese Bridge

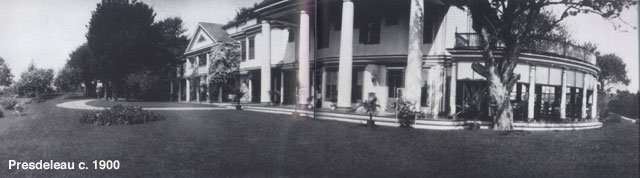
35 room mansion with colonial style columns

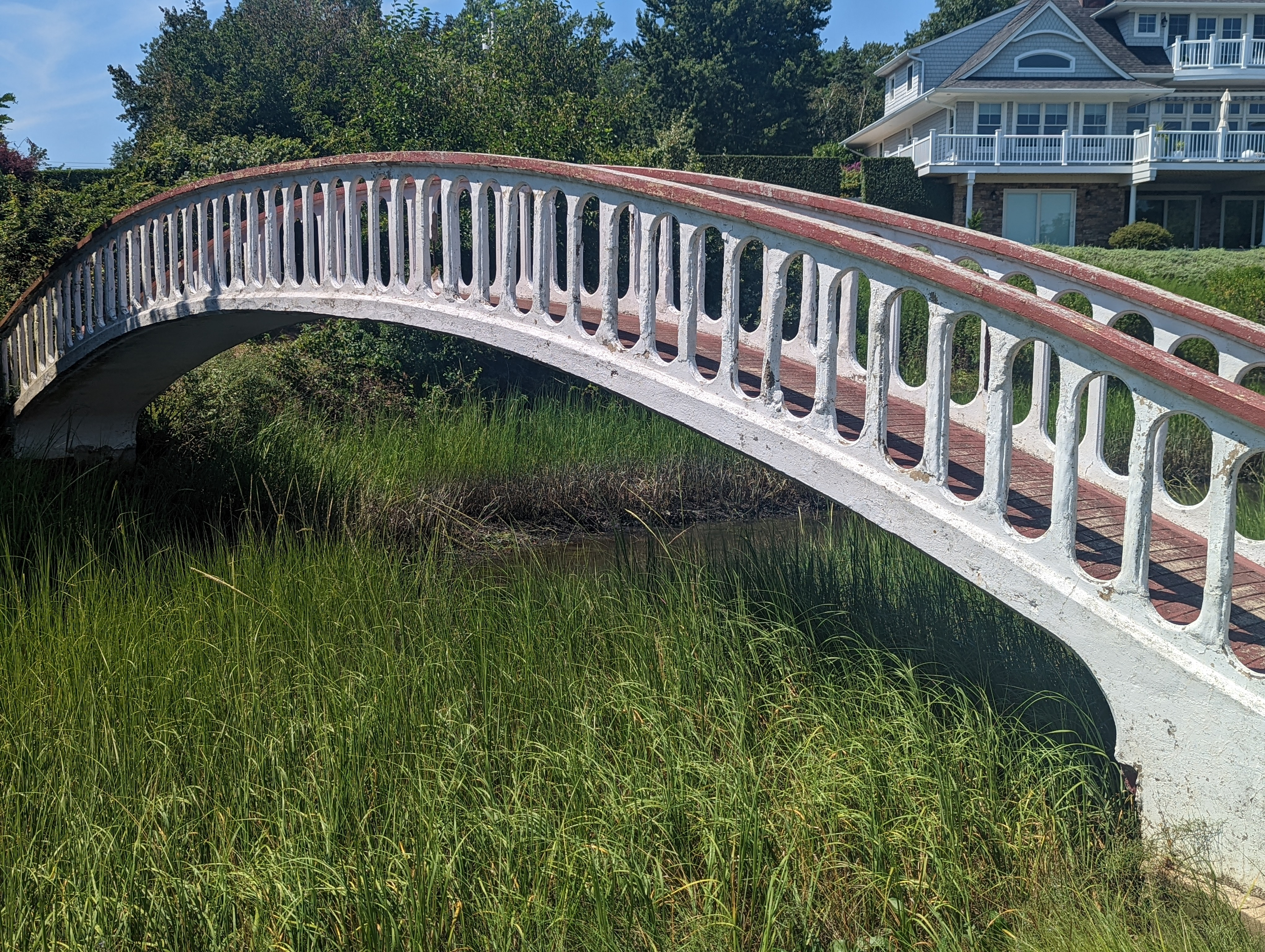
Smith-Ransome Japanese Bridge, Merkel Ln, Shelter Island, Suffolk County, NY

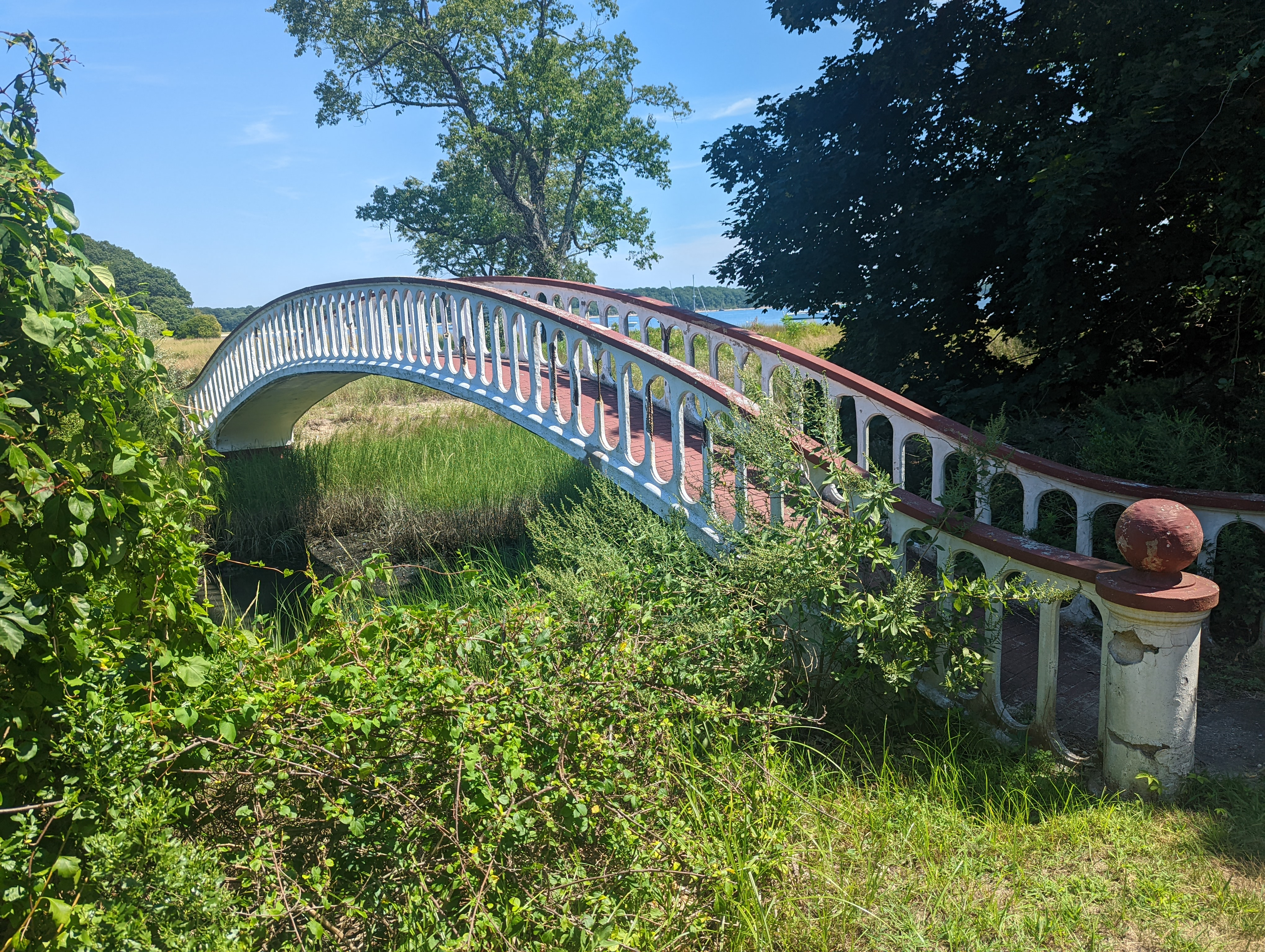
Smith-Ransome Japanese Bridge, Merkel Ln, Shelter Island, Suffolk County, NY
