= Camp Quinipet =

- U.S. National Register of Historic Places
- U.S. Historic district
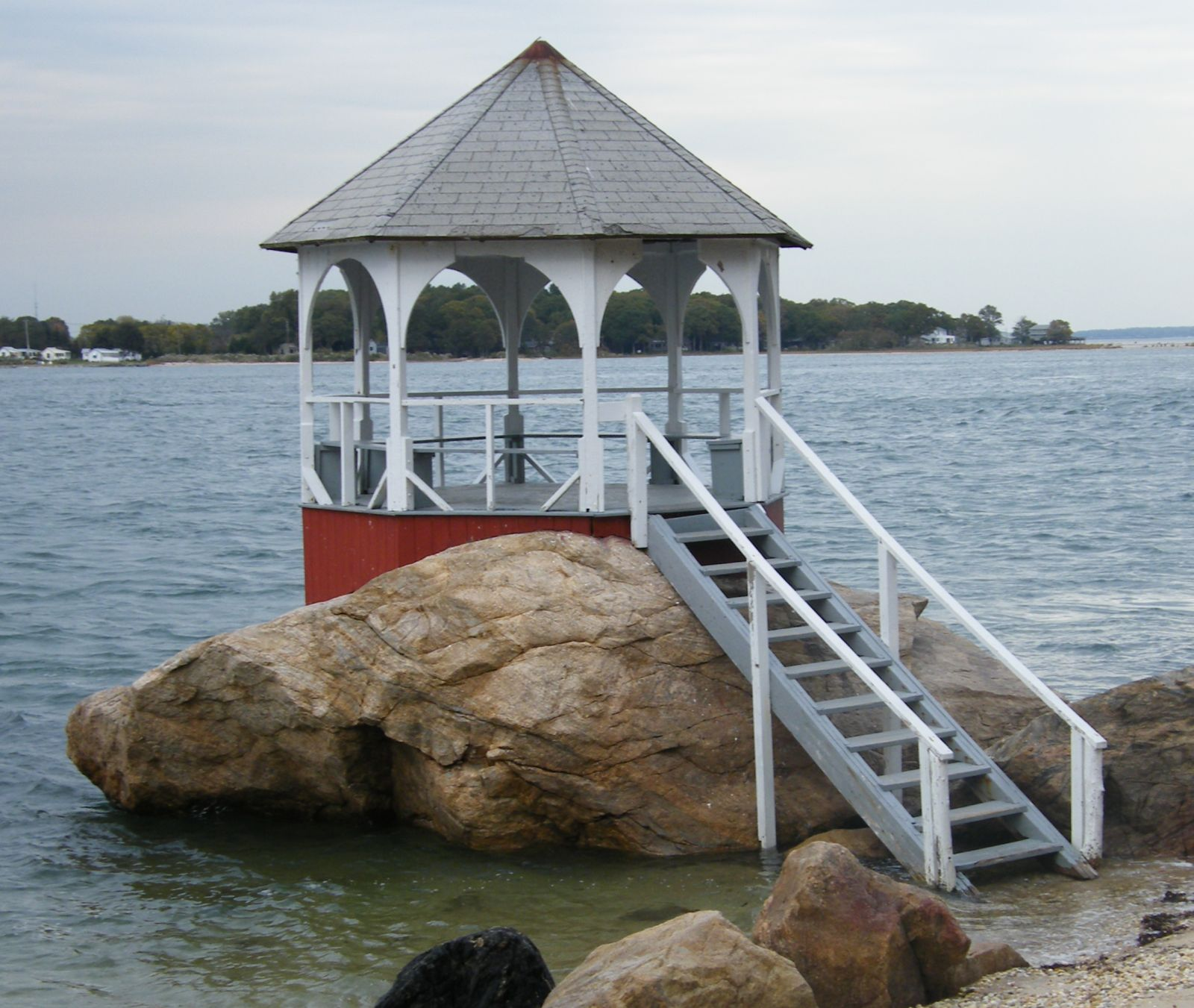
- Camp Quinipet, October 2008

- Location within New York Location within the United States
- Location: 78 Shore Rd., Shelter Island Heights, New York
- Coordinates: 41°4′15″N 72°22′56″W
- Area: 25.7 acres (10.4 ha)
- Built: 1922
- NRHP reference No.: 05001133
- Added to NRHP: October 5, 2005

Camp Quinipet is a Methodist camp, retreat center, and national historic district located at Shelter Island Heights in Suffolk County, New York. It was founded in 1922. There are 19 buildings that currently make up the camp facility that range in date from about 1830 to 1965. There are 13 contributing buildings, one contributing site, and two contributing structures. The camp is owned and operated by the New York Annual Conference of the United Methodist Church.

It was added to the National Register of Historic Places in 2005.
