= Shelter Island Heights Historic District =

Historic district in New York, United States

- U.S. National Register of Historic Places
- U.S. Historic district
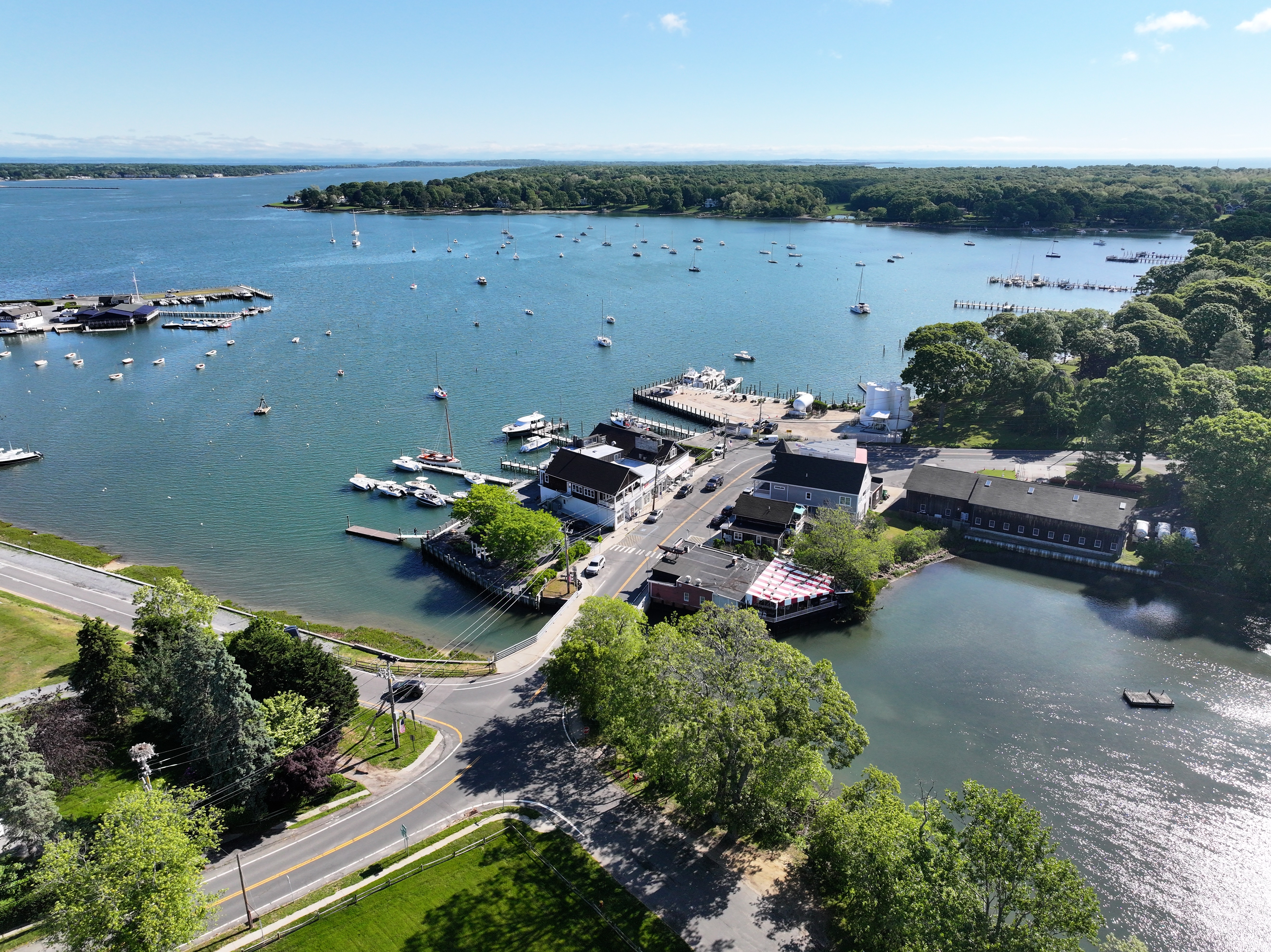
- Shelter Island Heights in June 2026

- Location within New York Location within the United States
- Location: Roughly bounded by St. Johns St., Tower Hill Rd. Sunnyside Ave., Meadow Pl., Chase Cr. and Dering Harbor, Shelter Island Heights, New York
- Coordinates: 41°5′4″N 72°21′26″W
- Area: 105 acres (42 ha)
- Built: 1872
- Architect: Copeland, Robert Morris; French, John et al.
- Architectural style: Bungalow/Craftsman, Queen Anne, Gothic Revival
- NRHP reference No.: 93000335
- Added to NRHP: May 7, 1993

Shelter Island Heights Historic District is a national historic district located at Shelter Island Heights in Suffolk County, New York. There are 141 contributing buildings and one contributing structure.

It was added to the National Register of Historic Places in 1993.
