= Manhanset Chapel =

- U.S. National Register of Historic Places
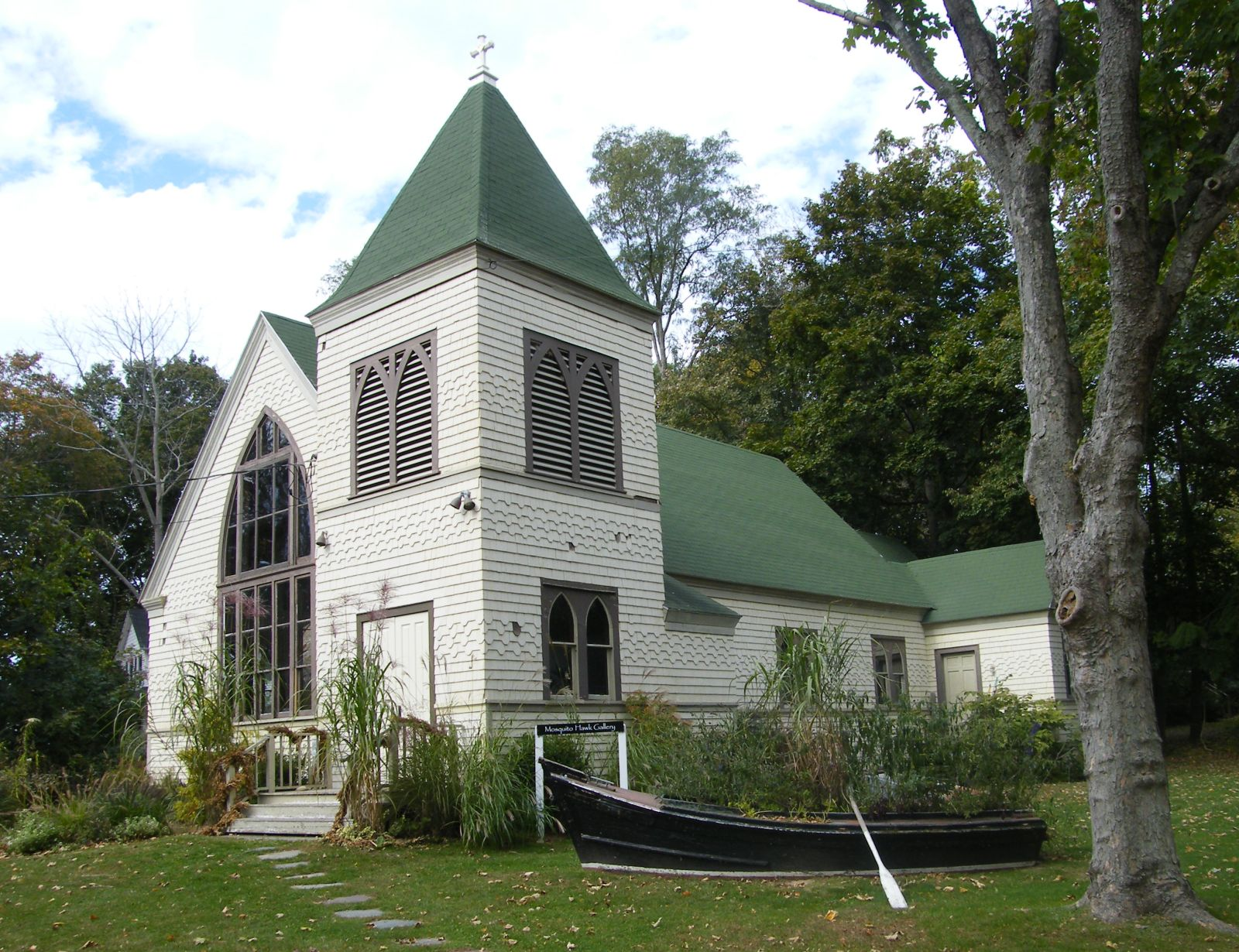

- Location within New York Location within the United States
- Location: 24 N. Ferry Rd., Shelter Island, New York
- Coordinates: 41°4′5″N 72°20′10″W
- Area: less than one acre
- Built: 1890
- Architect: Wasburn, Beale & Co., Architects
- Architectural style: Late Victorian, Gothic
- NRHP reference No.: 97000979
- Added to NRHP: August 29, 1997

Manhanset Chapel, also known as Mechanics' Hall, is a historic nondenominational chapel at 24 N. Ferry Road in Shelter Island, Suffolk County, New York. It was built in 1890 and moved to its present site in 1924. It was originally located on the grounds of the Manhaset House Hotel. It is a modest, frame Gothic Revival style structure. It consists of a gabled nave; a prominent, square engaged tower; a distinct chancel with a lower gabled roof; and a rear entrance wing.

It was added to the National Register of Historic Places in 1997.

In 1986, the Osofsky family donated the chapel to the Shelter Island Historical Society, which restored it to the 1924 period of its significance when it was used by the Junior Order of United American Mechanics. In 2011, Randy Osofsky repurchased the chapel with her husband, Stephen Kessler, for use as an arts and events space for Shelter Island.
