= Shelter Island Heights, New York =

- Hamlet and census-designated place
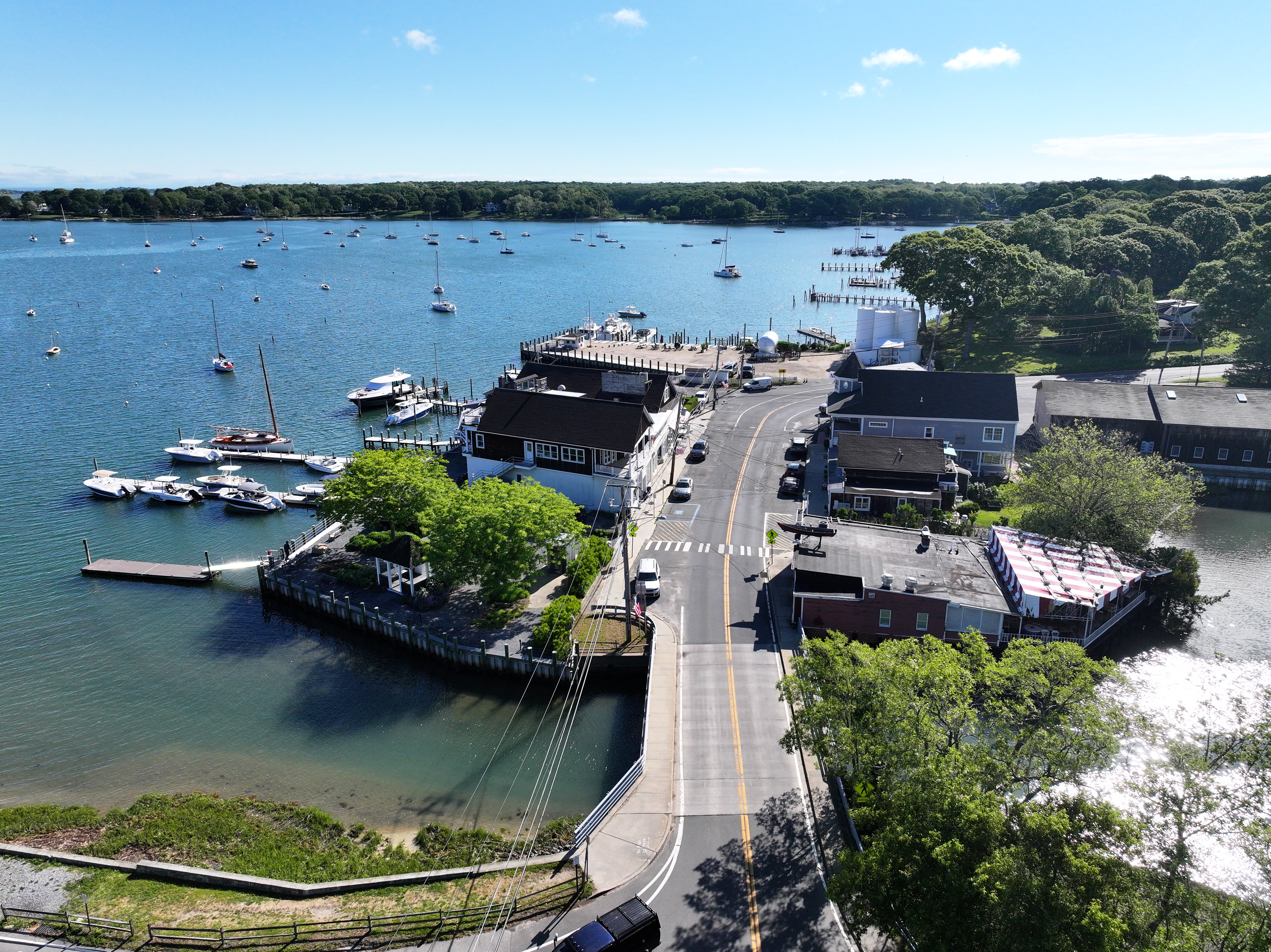
- Shelter Island Heights in June 2026

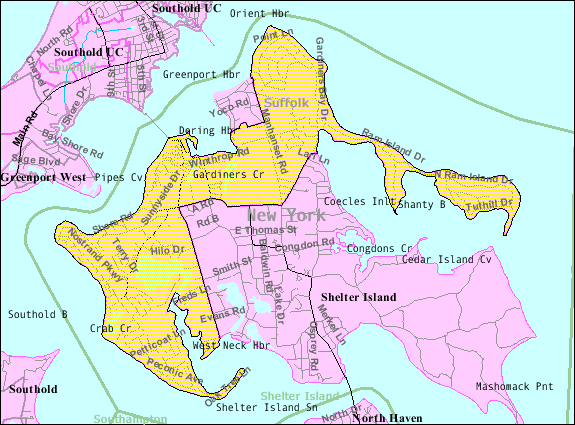
- U.S. Census map of Shelter Island Heights

- Location within the state of New York
- Coordinates: 41°4′41″N 72°21′3″W
- Country: United States
- State: New York
- County: Suffolk
- Town: Shelter Island

Area
  - Total: 13.53 sq mi (35.04 km^{2})
  - Land: 5.40 sq mi (13.98 km^{2})
  - Water: 8.13 sq mi (21.06 km^{2})
- Elevation: 56 ft (17 m)

Population (2020)
  - Total: 1,601
  - Density: 296.6/sq mi (114.52/km^{2})
- Time zone: UTC-5 (Eastern (EST))
  - Summer (DST): UTC-4 (EDT)
- ZIP code: 11965
- Area codes: 631, 934
- FIPS code: 36-66850
- GNIS feature ID: 965037

Shelter Island Heights is a hamlet and census-designated place (CDP) located in the Town of Shelter Island, in Suffolk County, New York, United States. It is located on the north side of Shelter Island, surrounding the village of Dering Harbor. The population was 1,601 at the time of the 2020 census.

== Geography ==
According to the United States Census Bureau, the CDP has a total area of 5.6 square miles (15 km^{2}), of which 5.4 square miles (14 km^{2}) is land and 0.3 square miles (0.78 km^{2}), or 4.97%, is water.

== Demographics ==
At the 2000 census there were 981 people, 459 households and 302 families residing in the CDP. The population density was 183.1 inhabitants per square mile (70.7/km^{2}). There were 1,374 housing units at an average density of 256.5 per square mile (99.0/km^{2}). The racial makeup of the CDP was 98.17% White, 0.31% African American, 0.41% Asian, and 1.12% from two or more races. Hispanic or Latino of any race were 1.33% of the population.

There were 459 households, of which 16.3% had children under the age of 18 living with them, 58.8% were married couples living together, 5.9% had a female householder with no husband present, and 34.0% were non-families. 29.8% of all households were made up of individuals, and 20.7% had someone living alone who was 65 years of age or older. The average household size was 2.14 and the average family size was 2.62.

14.9% of the population were under the age of 18, 3.1% from 18 to 24, 14.3% from 25 to 44, 31.9% from 45 to 64, and 35.9% who were 65 years of age or older. The median age was 56 years. For every 100 females, there were 87.6 males. For every 100 females age 18 and over, there were 86.8 males.

The median household income was $65,446 and the median family income was $76,162. Males had a median income of $46,750 compared with $37,955 for females. The per capita income was $34,083. About 4.6% of families and 6.2% of the population were below the poverty line, including 7.6% of those under age 18 and 2.9% of those age 65 or over.

== Education ==
The school district for the census-designated place is Shelter Island Union Free School District.

== See also ==
- North Ferry
- Shelter Island Heights Historic District
