= Shelter Island, New York =

- Town
- Town of Shelter Island
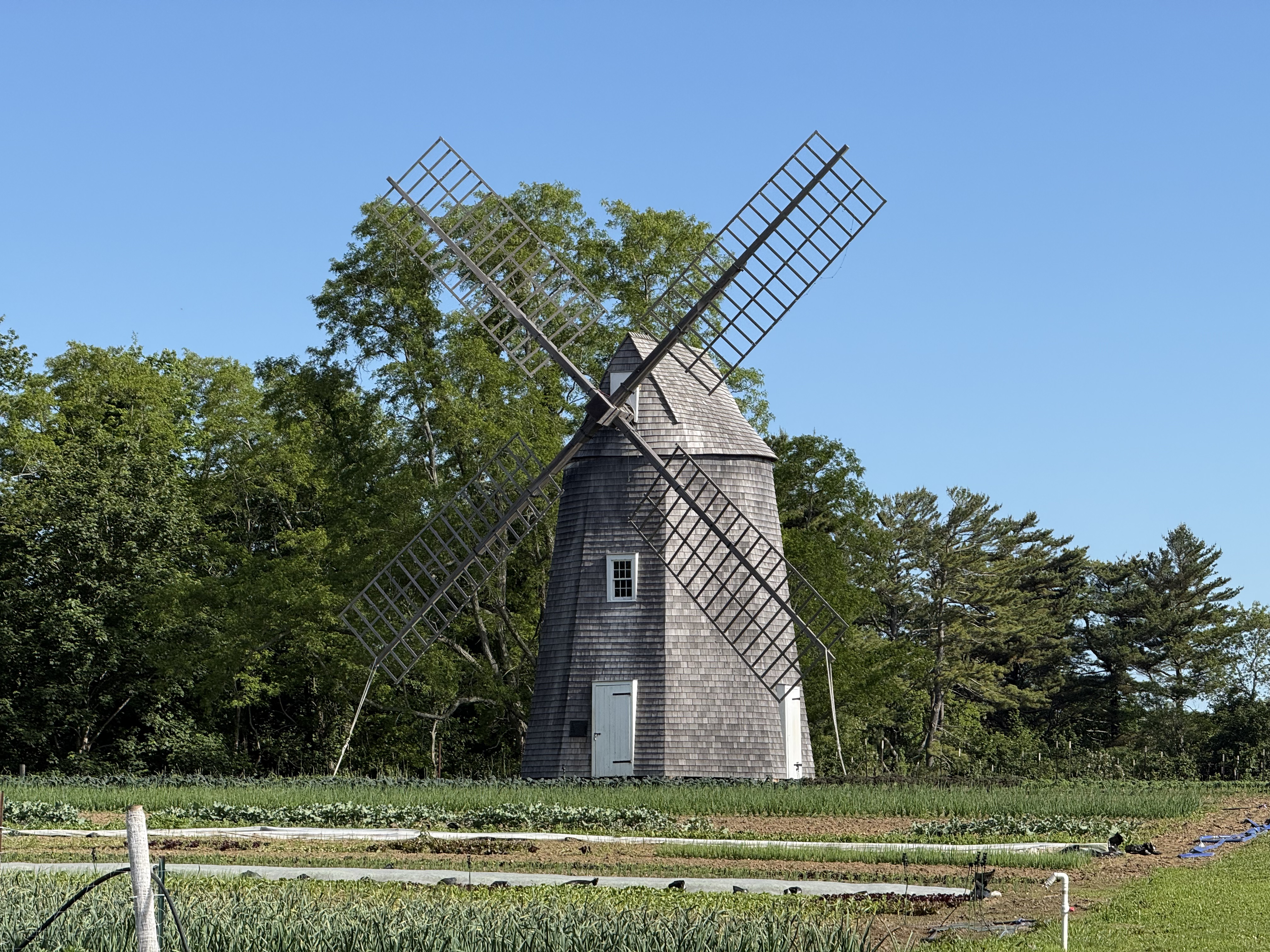
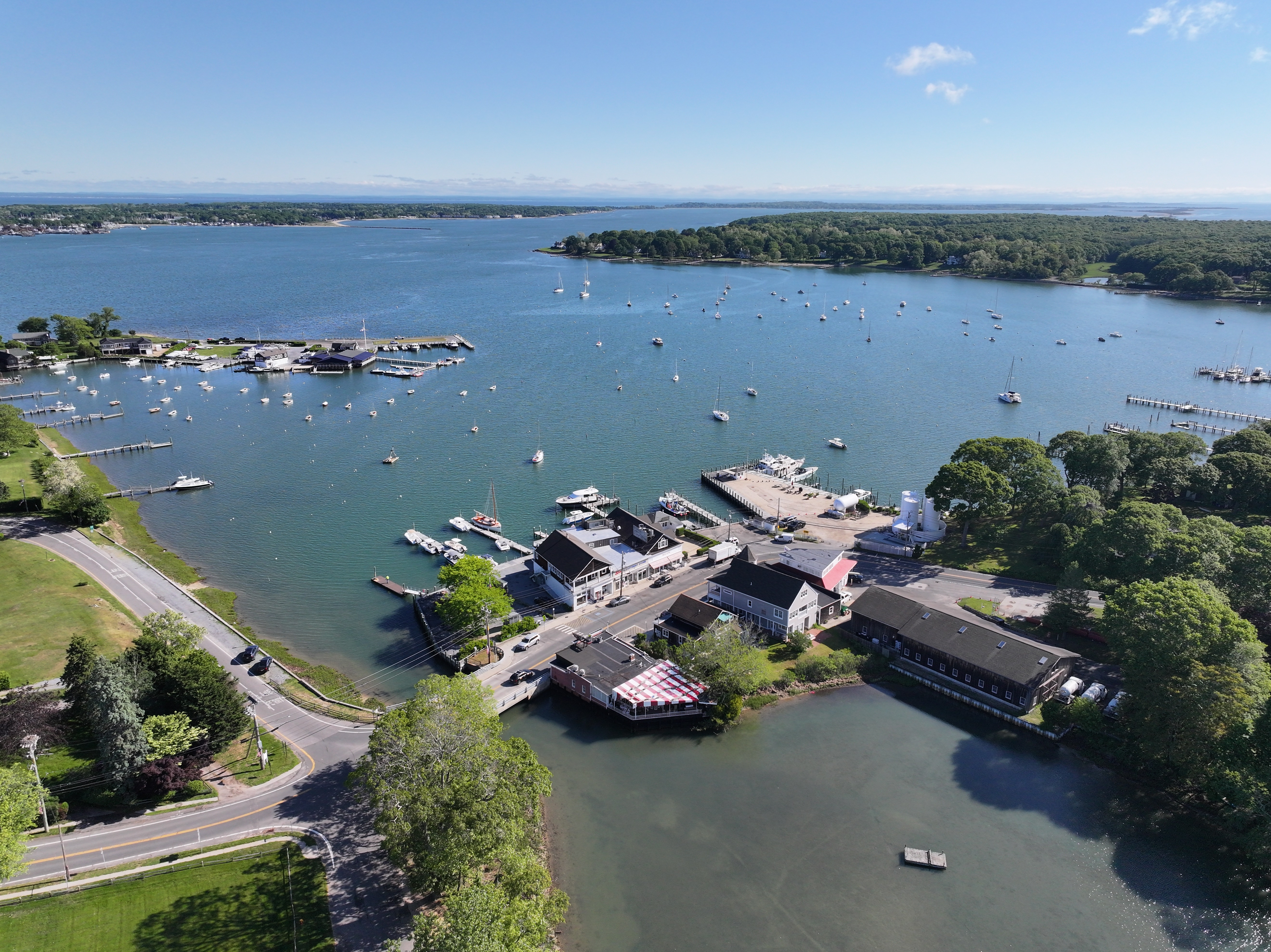
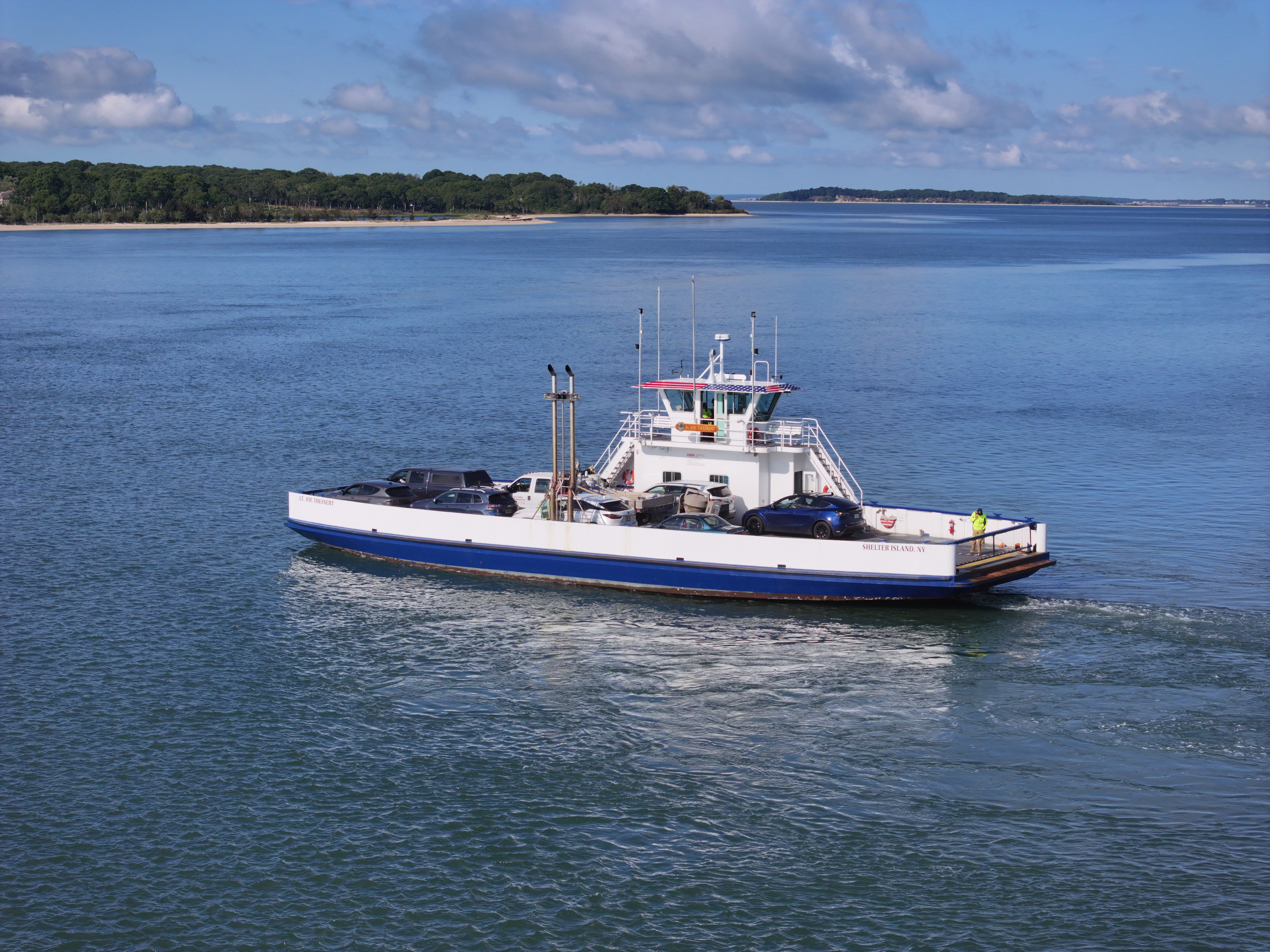
- Shelter Island Windmill Shelter Island Heights South Ferry

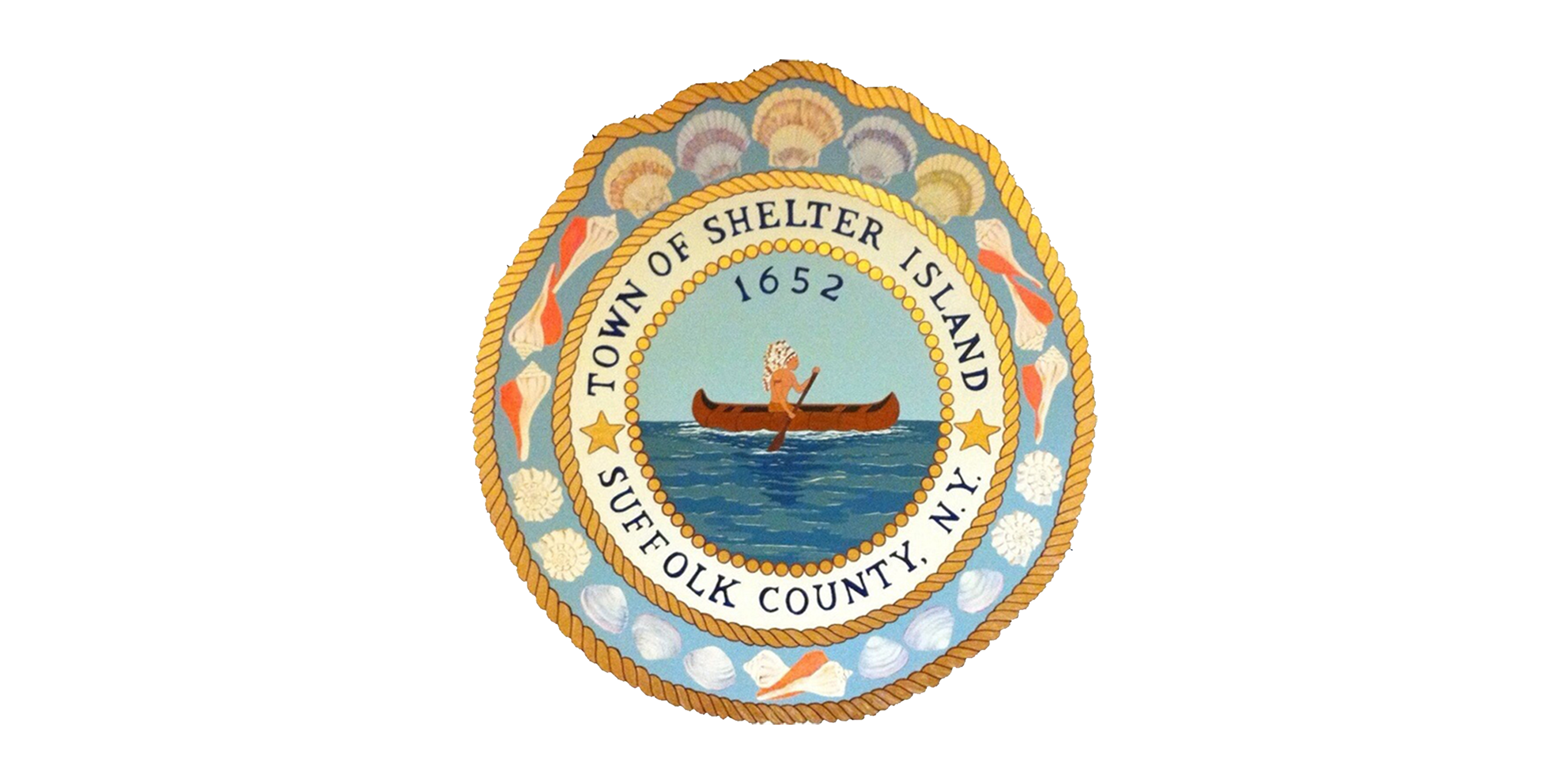
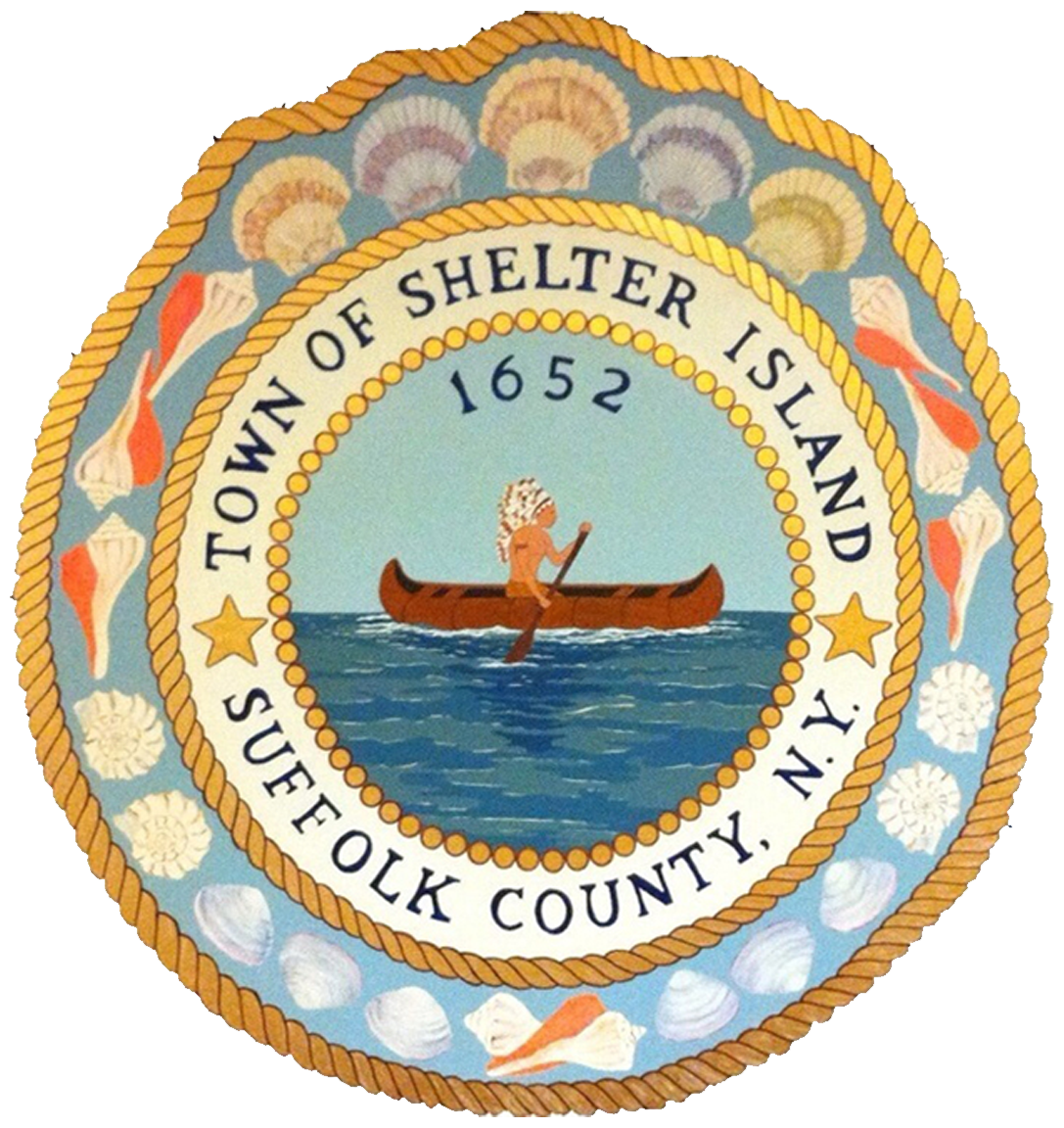
- Flag Seal

- Location in Suffolk County
- Coordinates: 41°4′41″N 72°21′3″W
- Country: United States
- State: New York
- County: Suffolk

Government
  - Type: Civil Township
  - Town Supervisor: Amber F. Brach-Williams (R)

Area
  - Total: 29.11 sq mi (75.39 km^{2})
  - Land: 12.19 sq mi (31.58 km^{2})
  - Water: 16.92 sq mi (43.82 km^{2})
- Elevation: 56 ft (17 m)

Population (2010)
  - Total: 3,253
  - Estimate (2016): 2,413
  - Density: 266.8/sq mi (103.01/km^{2})
- Time zone: UTC-5 (Eastern (EST))
  - Summer (DST): UTC-4 (EDT)
- ZIP Codes: 11964, 11965
- Area codes: 631, 934
- FIPS code: 36-103-66839
- GNIS feature ID: 0965037
- Website: www.shelterislandtown.gov

Shelter Island is an island town in eastern Suffolk County, New York, United States, near the eastern end of Long Island. The population was 3,253 at the time of the 2020 census.

== History ==
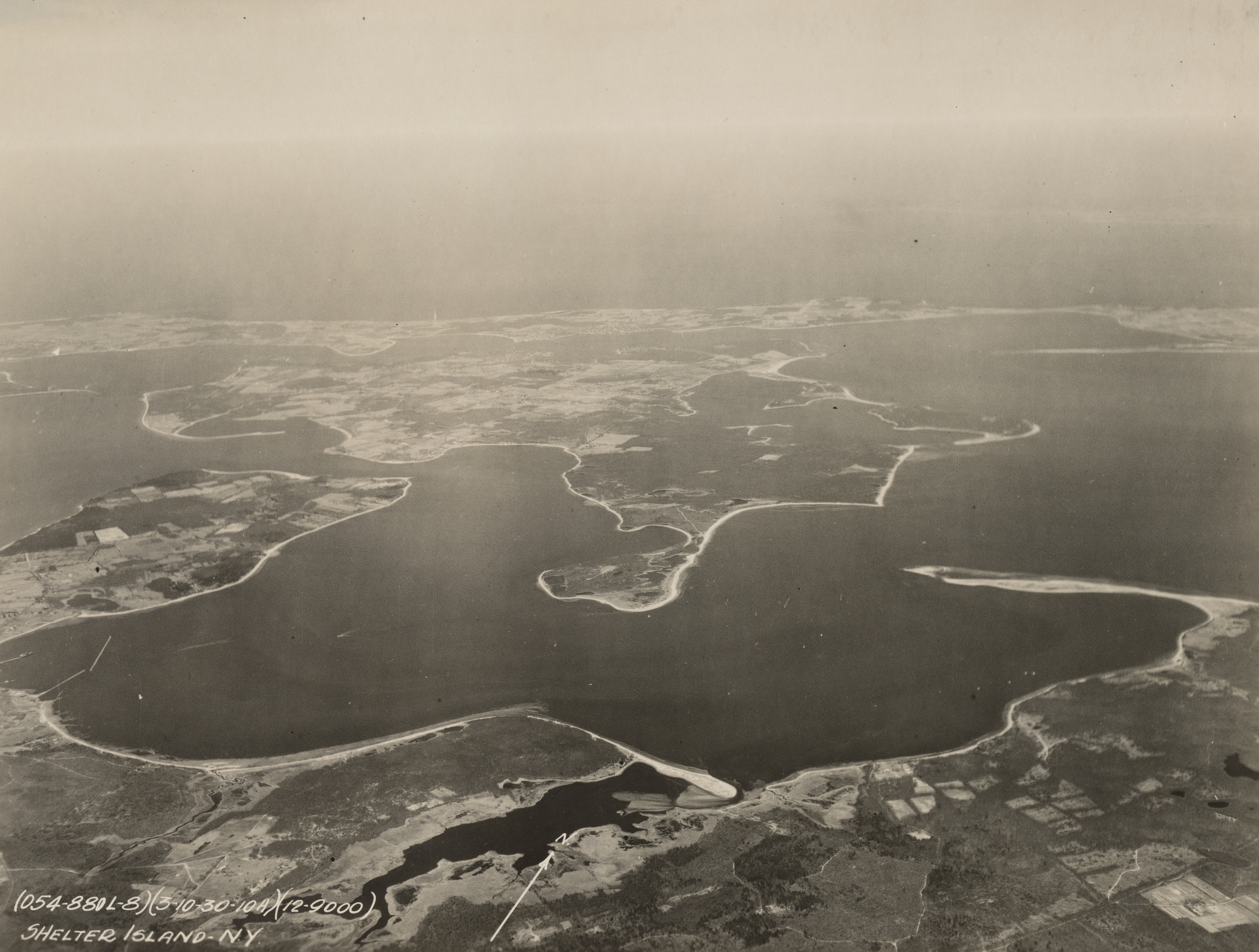
Shelter Island, 1930

The island was long inhabited by indigenous peoples, related to those who lived north of Long Island Sound. At the time of European encounter, it was occupied by the Manhanset tribe, an Algonquian-speaking people related to the Pequot and other Algonquians of New England. The original name of the island, used by the Manhanset Indians, is Manhansack-aha-quash-awamock, which literally translates to "Island sheltered by islands."

=== Early settlers ===
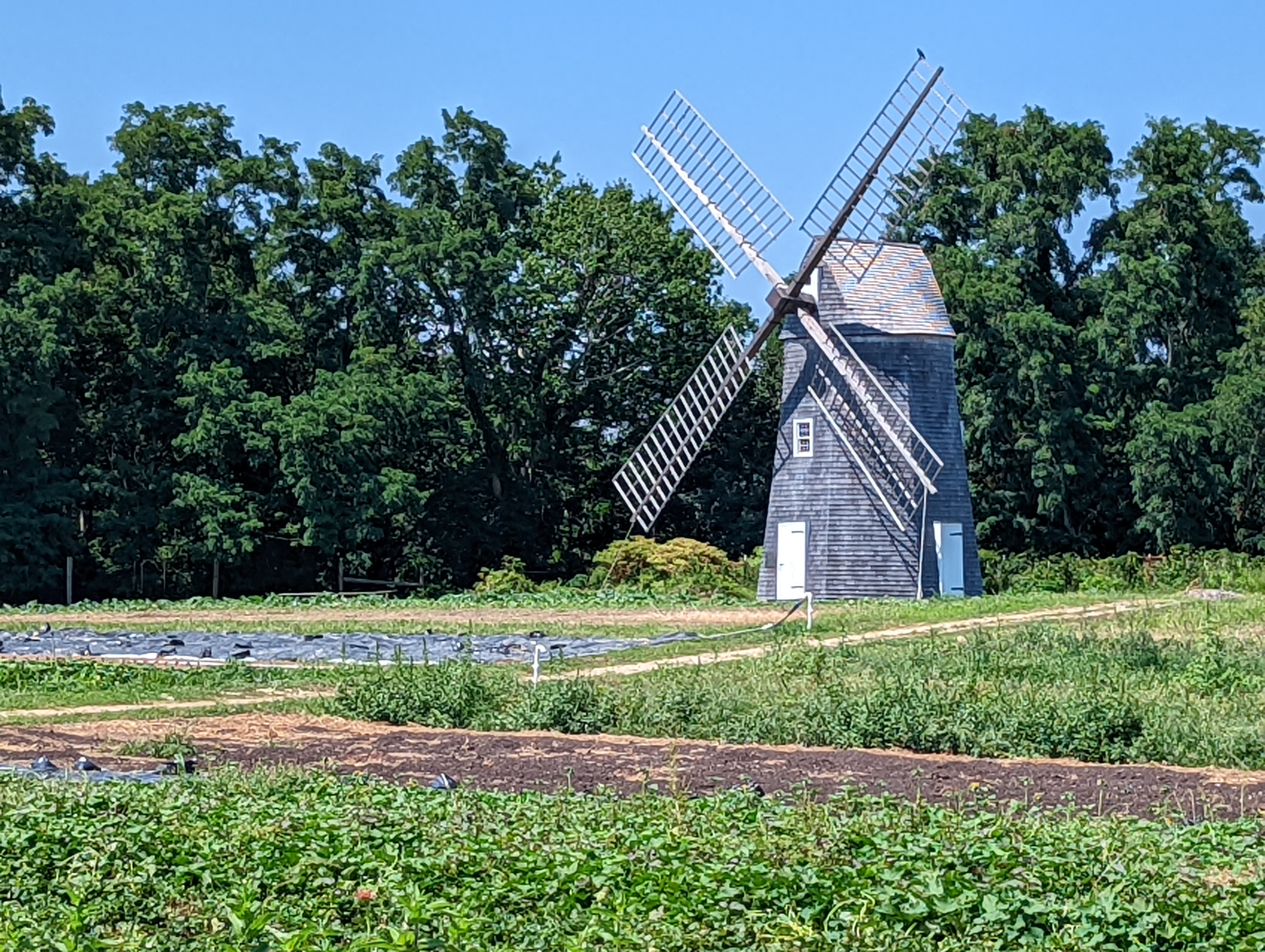
Shelter Island Windmill, Manwaring Road, Shelter Island, Suffolk County, NY

Shelter Island was included in the original Plymouth Company land grant made by James I of England in 1620. On April 22, 1636, Charles I of England, told that the colony had not made any settlements yet on Long Island, gave the island to William Alexander, 1st Earl of Stirling. The grant gave Alexander all of Long Island and adjacent islands. Alexander gave James Farret power to act as his agent and attorney in colonizing Long Island. In reward Farret was allowed to choose 12,000 acres (49 km^{2}) for his personal use. Farret chose Shelter Island and Robin's Island for his use. Farret in turn sold the islands to Stephen Goodyear, one of the founders of the New Haven Colony.

In 1651 Goodyear sold the island to a group of Barbados sugar merchants for 1,600 pounds of sugar. Nathaniel Sylvester (1610–1680), one of the merchants, was the island’s first white settler. He was among a number of English merchants who had lived and worked in Rotterdam (where he was born) before going to Barbados. His connections there and with the Netherlands helped him establish a far-flung trading enterprise. On March 23, 1652, he made the purchase official by agreement with Youghco (called Poggatticut), the sachem of the Manhanset tribe. The other owners, Sylvester’s brother Constant, and Thomas Middleton, never came to Long Island. In 1673 Nathaniel Sylvester claimed ownership of Shelter Island, Fishers Island, and other parts of Long Island. By that time the Manhansett had declined in number and power.

In 1652 Sylvester constructed a house on the island for his 17-year-old bride, Grissel (also spelled Grizzel) Brinley from London. Her mother was Anna (Wase) Brinley and her father Thomas Brinley had been an auditor in the court of King Charles I. With the Revolution he had lost his position; Grissel had gone to the colony with her older sister Anne, who had married William Coddington, the governor of the Rhode Island colony. Archeological research in the 21st century has revealed there may have been two early house complexes. The Sylvesters had eleven surviving children. The more elaborate manor house, which survives today, was built in 1733 by a Sylvester grandson.

The Sylvester estate was developed as a large provisioning plantation. It raised food crops, as well as livestock for slaughter, sending casks of preserved meats and other supplies to Barbados. Labor was provided by a multicultural force of enslaved American Indians, enslaved Africans and English indentured servants. Sylvester and his associates were part of the Triangle Trade between the American colonies (including the Caribbean), Africa and England. His descendants continued to use slaves on the plantation into the 19th century. An estimated 200 black people are buried at the Negro Burying Ground on the North Peninsula.

The Sylvesters gave shelter to many persecuted Quakers. Sylvester Manor stands today, just off New York State Route 114, and is controlled by Sylvester descendants. All but about 24 acres of the original thousands of acres have gone into other hands.

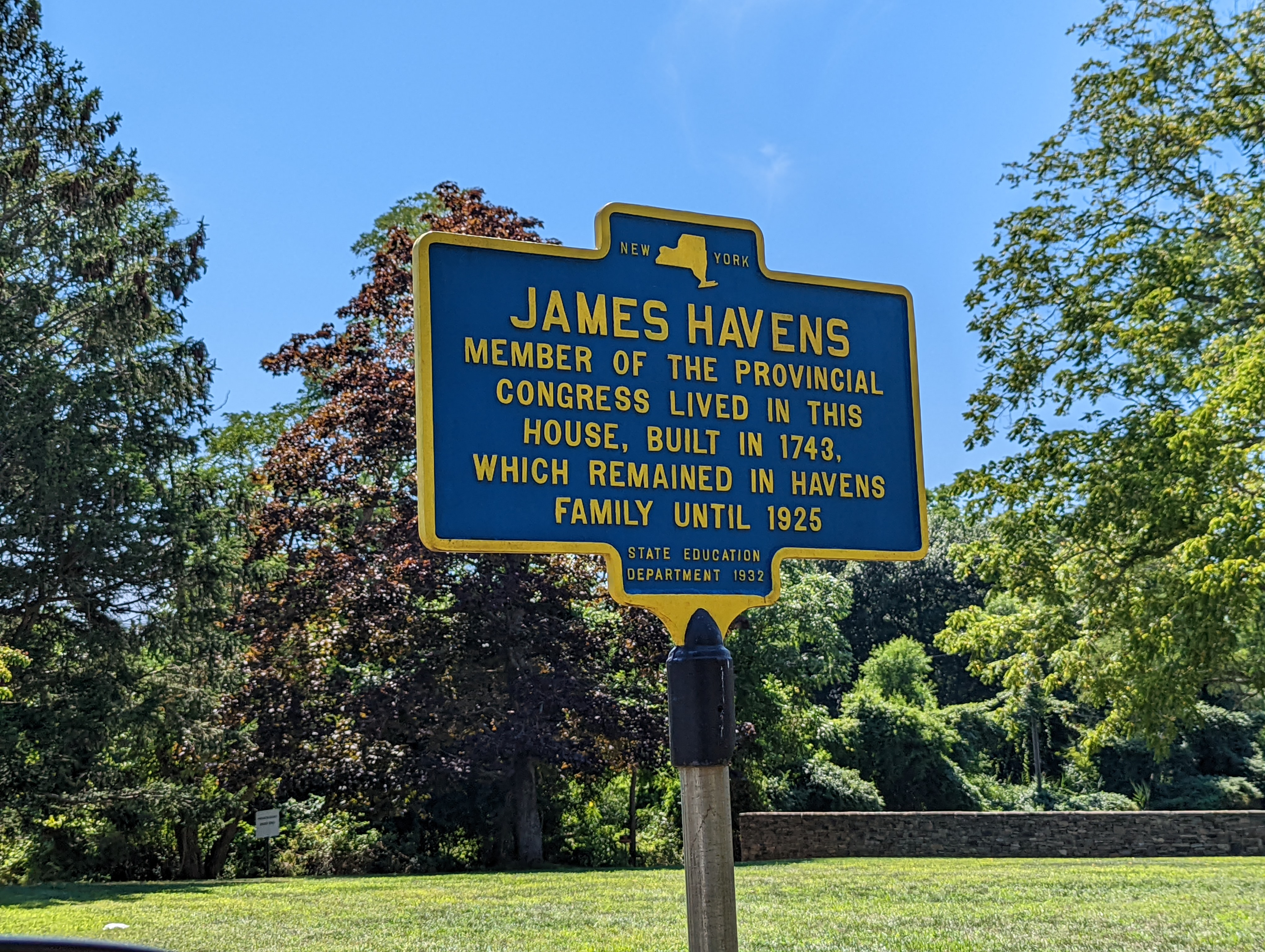
Shelter Island, Route 114, Shelter Island, Suffolk County, NY

Following the death in 1680 of Nathaniel Sylvester, Shelter Island was divided between his two sons, Giles and Nathaniel II. In 1695, William Nicoll, a resident of Islip, bought from Giles the area now called Mashomack Nature Preserve. Three years later, in 1698, another newcomer, George Havens, bought 1,000 acres (4.0 km^{2}) from Nathaniel II. This parcel comprises what today is the Center; it stretched south to South Ferry and west to West Neck Creek. Over time these estates and parcels were split and divided by marriage and purchase, so that by the early 18th century, 20 families lived on Shelter Island. By order of the Provincial Government, the Town of Shelter Island was established in 1730. The community developed from there.

=== Colonial era ===
James Nicoll Havens, a member of the New York Provincial Congress, built a home on the island in 1743. He was the first town supervisor on the island. His former home is now owned by the local historical society.

Jonathan Nicoll Havens (1757–1799), born on Shelter Island, was a member of the First Continental Congress in 1774. He also served in New York’s delegation that in 1788 approved the federal constitution. Mashomack Forest (today Mashomack Nature Preserve) was owned by the Nicolls family for 230 years. Nicolls Creek was named for that family. A few Manhanset still lived in the wooded Sachem’s Neck area up until the 1790s.

Shelter Island had brushes with early Colonial military activity:

- The British shipped hay from Hay Beach during the American Revolution.
- The schooner Paragon was built on the island at Lord’s Shipyard, located on West Neck Creek. In 1804 the ship under Capt. Sam Lord successfully ran a British blockade during the Napoleonic Wars.
- During the War of 1812, the British ransacked numerous homes on the island.

The first ferryboat to serve the island was run by the Boisseau family at Stearns Point, nearby Crescent Beach. The North Ferry began service to Greenport in the 1850s. Throughout the 19th century, the island continued as a base for fishermen in the surrounding waters. Fish processing plants sent their products across the country.

=== Shelter Island Heights established ===
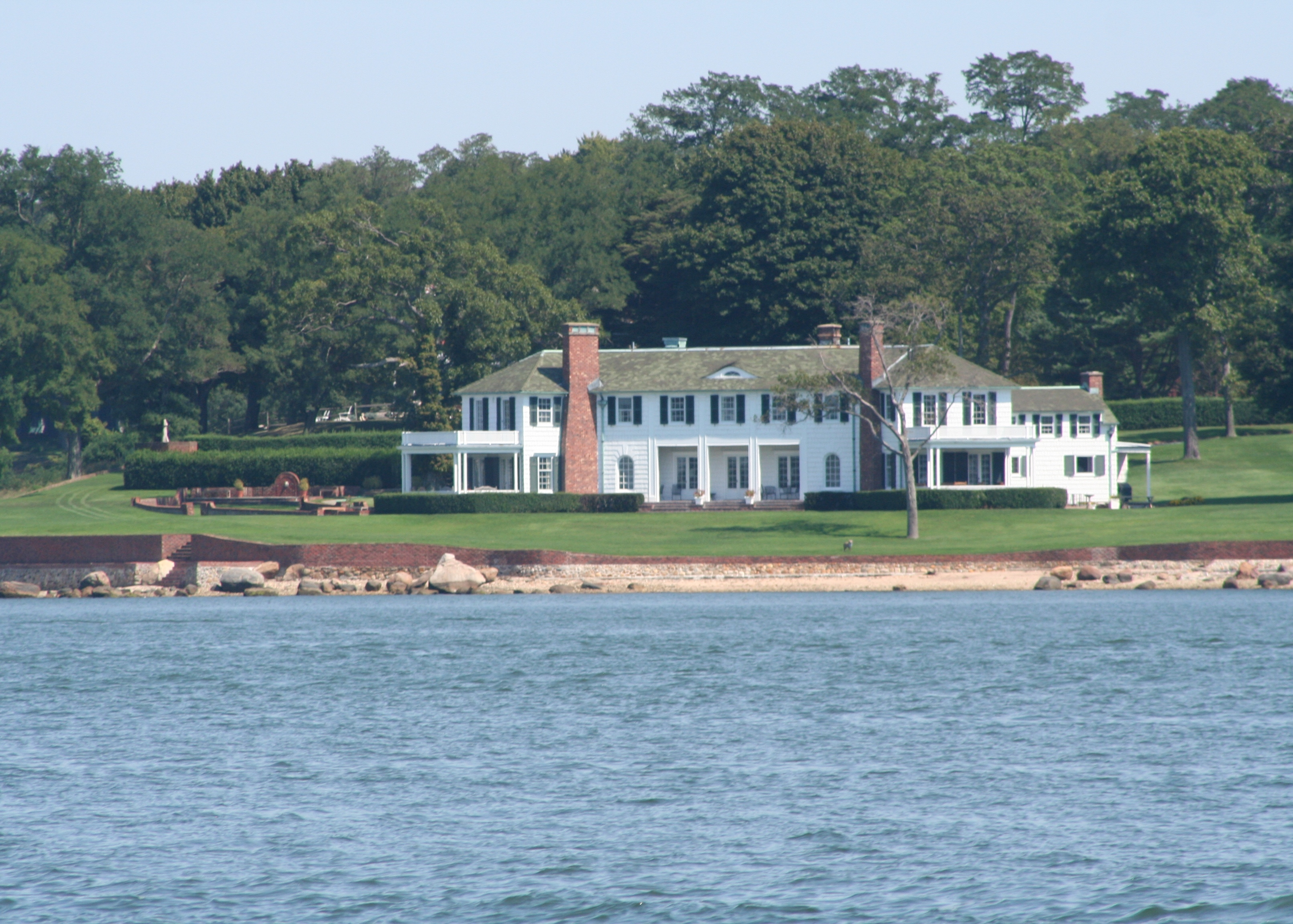
House on Shelter Island

Shelter Island Heights was developed in 1871 as a summer resort for camp meetings, after a group of Brooklyn businessmen purchased the Frederick Chase estate for this purpose. It was developed by the Shelter Island Grove and Camp Meeting Association of the Methodist Episcopal Church. For eight years, the camp meetings took place on the island, before moving to Jamesport. During this time, Robert Morris Copeland designed the Union Chapel, built in 1875. In 1984 it was added to the National Register of Historic Places (NRHP).

Shelter Island Heights in total was a planned development by Copeland. The houses were designed in classic American styles: Stick-Eastlake, Queen Anne Style, and Colonial Revival. During the eight years from 1872 to 1880, when camp meetings were held here, about 70 summer cottages were built in the Heights. By 1890 the district was well-defined architecturally; the residences have not changed much since then. Shelter Island Heights was listed in 1993 as an Historical District on both the NRHP and the New York State Register of Historic Places.

At the turn of the 20th century, fish processing plants still operated on the island. One was located at the end of Burns Road, another on Big Ram Island, off what is today Tuthill Road. Some summer residents traveled here by steam ferries from New York City.

White Hill is located above the North Ferry landing in Shelter Island Heights. The Prospect Hotel was built on the hill. After it burned down, it was rebuilt, but was destroyed a second time by fire in 1942. Today the land where the hotel was located is a town park.

=== Growth after 1900 ===
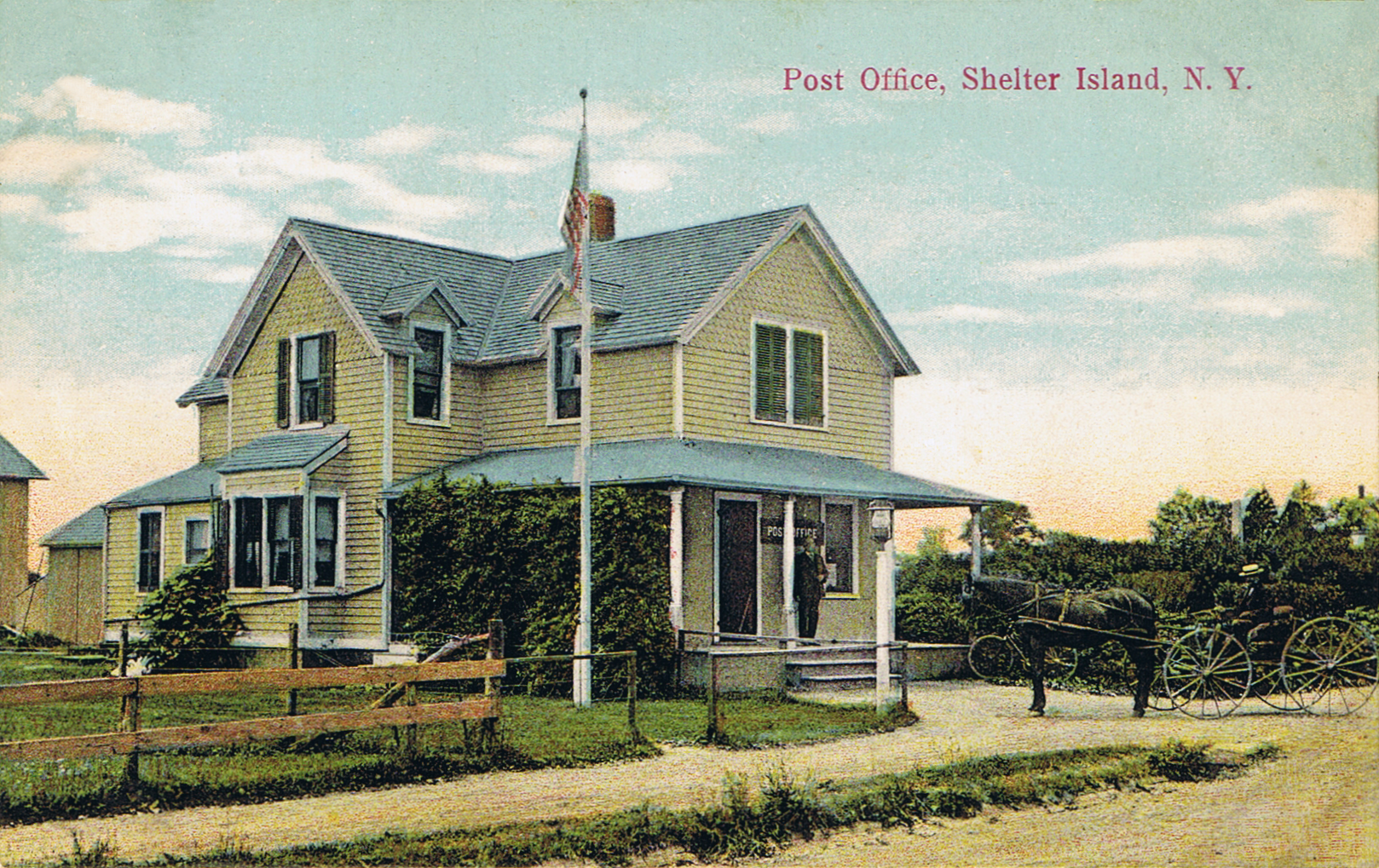
Post Office, Shelter Island, N.Y.

Francis Marion Smith (1846–1931) was known as the "Borax King" for his mining successes. Smith and his family bought a home on the island in 1892. He expanded it to more than 30 rooms and called his estate Presdeleau (French for "by the water"). By 1906 he owned more than 500 acres (2.0 km^{2}) on the south side of the island. Smith Cove and Smith Street were named for him. Smith shipped in deer from California to hunt in his "deer park"; their descendants roam some areas of the island. The remains of his estate are reinforced concrete retaining walls and a "Japanese" footbridge from the garden, built by Ernest L. Ransome about 1898, behind Merkle Lane.

Another 19th-century millionaire who had an estate on Shelter Island was Artemas Ward (1848–1925), a pioneer in mass-market advertising. Ward made millions of dollars by monopolizing all advertising on New York City elevated trains, subways, and streetcars. Ward had a large estate on the south side of the island. Ward wrote a biography of his great-grandfather, Major General Artemas Ward (1727–1800), a commander in the American Revolutionary War. After years of being tied up in court, the vestiges of Ward’s original estate in the Shorewood section of the Island (including a manor house, formal Italian gardens, and a concrete water tower) have been renovated. In the case of the manor house, it has been partially "deconstructed" to restore an earlier version.

Following World War I, development slowly crept onto the island. Summer camps were started in the 1920s, including Camp Quinipet, a United Methodist Church camp and retreat center on Rocky Point Road. On West Neck Harbor, developers Albert and Fred Dickerson built houses for what is today called Montclair Colony. Homes were built on Silver Beach, Ram Island, and Hilo Farms.

Following the Depression, some of the summer cottages were abandoned or left to rot. Recovery was slow. It was not until after World War II that summer residents started returning in larger numbers. During the 1950s a farm cooperative grew lima beans on the island. This was the last of commercial farming on Shelter Island.

In the 1960s and 1970s, more families started to move to Shelter Island as year-round residents. The Gerard family owned the property at Sachem’s Neck that had belonged to the Nicoll family for more than 200 years, and later to financier Otto Kahn. Developers eyed the 2,000 acres (8.1 km^{2}). The land was purchased in January 1980 by the Nature Conservancy to preserve it as a nature park in perpetuity; half of the funds to buy the forest were raised on the island to create Mashomack Preserve.

There are still numerous Shelter Island residents with family roots dating to families here at the time of the American Revolution. Some summer residents are fifth-generation seasonal visitors.

== Geography ==
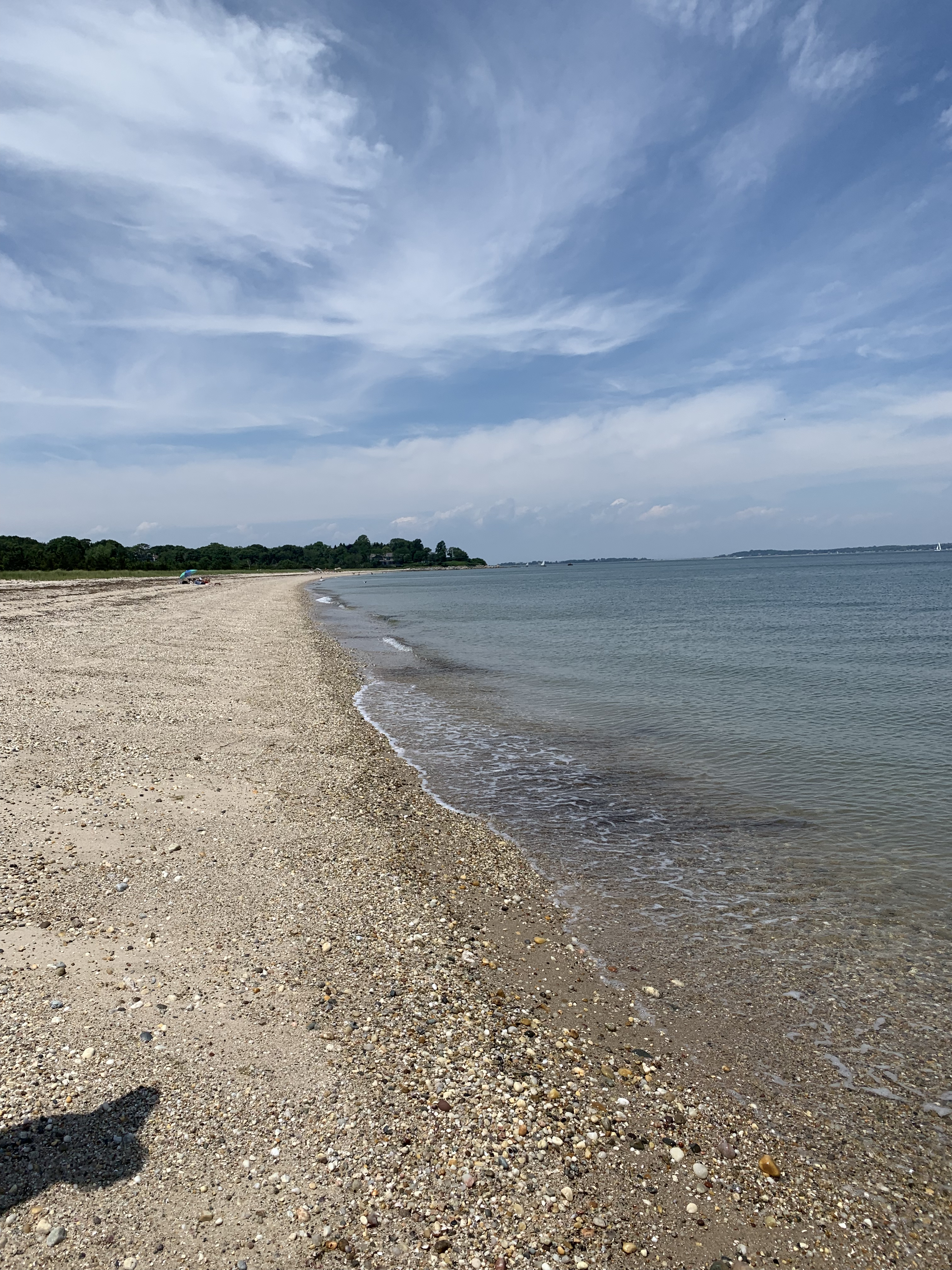
A beach on Shelter Island

Shelter Island lies between the North and South Forks of Long Island. It is surrounded on three sides by Shelter Island Sound and on the fourth side by Gardiners Bay. It can be reached via ferry from Greenport to the north (an approximately eight-minute trip) or from North Haven to the south (an approximately five-minute trip). The two ferry crossings are connected by New York State Route 114, which crosses the island.

Shelter Island is around 8,000 acres (32 km^{2}) in size. Vast tracts are protected wetlands, a nature preserve marshland. Nearly one-third of the island is owned by The Nature Conservancy to be preserved in a wild state. The Preserve has four nature and bird-watching trails, varying in length from 1.5 miles (2.4 km) to 11 miles (18 km), as well as a barrier-free Braille trail for the visually impaired.

According to the United States Census Bureau, Shelter Island has a total area of 28.7 square miles (74 km^{2}), of which 12.2 square miles (32 km^{2}) is land and 16.5 square miles (43 km^{2}) (57.49%) is water.

== Demographics ==
Historical population
Census	Pop.	Note	%±
1790	201		—
1800	260		29.4%
1810	329		26.5%
1820	389		18.2%
1830	330		−15.2%
1840	379		14.8%
1850	386		1.8%
1860	506		31.1%
1870	645		27.5%
1880	732		13.5%
1890	921		25.8%
1900	1,066		15.7%
1910	1,064		−0.2%
1920	890		−16.4%
1930	1,113		25.1%
1940	1,073		−3.6%
1950	1,144		6.6%
1960	1,312		14.7%
1970	1,644		25.3%
1980	2,071		26.0%
1990	2,263		9.3%
2000	2,228		−1.5%
2010	2,392		7.4%
2020	3,253		36.0%
U.S. Decennial Census

As of the 2000 census, there were 2,228 people, 996 households, and 656 families residing in the town. However, during the summer months the population can exceed 20,000. The population density was 183.6 inhabitants per square mile (70.9/km^{2}). There were 2,370 housing units at an average density of 195.3 per square mile (75.4/km^{2}). The racial makeup of the town was 96.32% White, 0.72% Black or African American, 0.04% Native American, 0.49% Asian, 0.09% from other races, and 2.33% from two or more races. Hispanic or Latino of any race were 2.38% of the population.

There were 996 households, out of which 20.3% had children under the age of 18 living with them, 56.1% were married couples living together, 7.2% had a female head of household, and 34.1% were non-families. 28.8% of all households were made up of individuals, and 17.8% had someone living alone who was 65 years of age or older. The average household size was 2.24 and the average family size was 2.75.

In the town, the population was spread out, with 18.1% under the age of 18, 4.0% from 18 to 24, 20.1% from 25 to 44, 29.1% from 45 to 64, and 28.6% who were 65 years of age or older. The median age was 49 years. For every 100 females, there were 91.9 males. For every 100 females age 18 and over, there were 90.8 males.

The median income for a household in the town was $53,011, and the median income for a family was $63,750. Males had a median income of $41,508 versus $36,316 for females. The per capita income for the town was $30,346. About 4.7% of families and 7.7% of the population were below the poverty line, including 14.0% of those under age 18 and 1.4% of those age 65 or over.

== Communities and locations ==
=== Villages (incorporated) ===
- Dering Harbor, on the north side of the island.

=== Neighborhoods (unincorporated) ===
- Harbor View, on the west side of the island overlooking West Neck Harbor, is made up of homes built since the 1950s. Originally part of a large egg farm called "Cackle Hill,” the property featured two homes. First, The manor house, which still sits adjacent to Harbor View community on about 17 acres. The second, a smaller farm house, stood on the top of cackle bluff and was removed before development of the community. The farm raised chickens and Lima beans. Residents: Several children of the original developers still own homes or properties in the neighborhood. The neighborhood is significant in the early queer rights movement. Several early residents of the neighborhood were queer rights activists, most of whom died in the AIDS epidemic.
- Shelter Island, the hamlet of Shelter Island, located on the south side.
- Shelter Island Heights, on the north side of the island. The Heights was developed as a Methodist Campground in the late 1800s. A private community, it is governed by the Shelter Island Heights Property Owners Corporation, which owns the roads and the North Ferry Company. The Heights was designated on the National Register of Historic Places as a historic district in 1993. The Victorian architecture includes 141 contributing buildings and one contributing structure.
- Silver Beach, on a peninsula on the southwest side of the island, overlooks breezy Peconic Bay to the west and West Neck Harbor to the east. Residents of Silver Beach Homeowners Association collectively own several large tracts of undeveloped property, including an 18-acre wooded preserve in the center of the peninsula that is maintained as a bird sanctuary and the access point to Shell Beach, which has a large, protected Piping Plover nesting site. Development on Silver Beach began in the post-World War II era, and many of the homes there are small cottages typical of the time, though some have been expanded.
- Westmoreland, on the west side of the island, was built as a private camp retreat. It is home to one of the Island's few remaining equestrian farms and has a private airstrip. The home of the late New York Governor Hugh Carey is on Westmoreland, as is the summer home of comedian Louis C.K.
- Nostrand Parkway runs along the west coast of the island, facing the open waters of Peconic Bay. Several prominent older homes there date to a development in the late 1800s known as West Neck Park. The main road, Nostrand Parkway, takes its name from the developer of West Neck Park.

=== Geographic features ===
- Coecles Harbor, an inlet on the east side of the island
- Smith Cove, an inlet on the south side of the island
- West Neck Harbor, an inlet at the southwest end of the island
- Fresh Pond, a glacial kettle hole on the southwest part of the island

== Government and politics ==
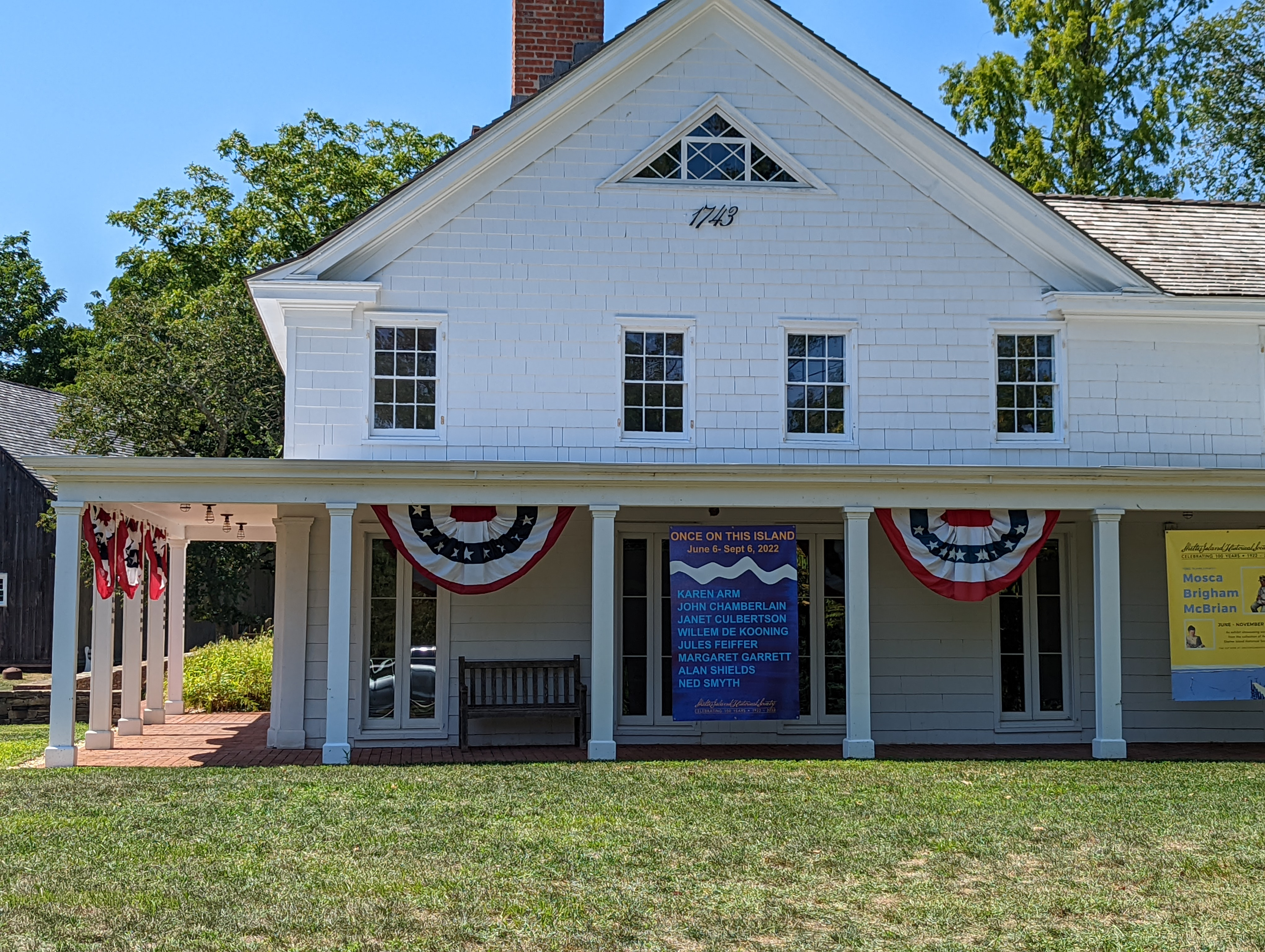
Shelter Island Historical Society, S Ferry Road, Shelter Island, Suffolk County, NY.

In the 1996 presidential election, it was the only town on Long Island to vote for Bob Dole. In 2004, John Kerry became the first Democrat in recent history to win Shelter Island. Shelter Island saw consecutive successes for the Democratic Party; in 2008 and 2012, Barack Obama won Shelter Island, in 2016 presidential election, Hillary Clinton won Shelter Island, and more recently, Joe Biden won Shelter Island in 2020, followed by Kamala Harris in 2024.

== Religion ==
Five places of worship are located on Shelter Island:

- Our Lady of the Isle, Roman Catholic, 5 Prospect Avenue, in Shelter Island Heights. Founded in 1907.
- Shelter Island Friends Meeting, Quakers, Sylvester Manor, 116 North Ferry Road (May–October); Havens House, 16 South Ferry Road (November–April).
- Shelter Island Presbyterian Church, 32 North Ferry Road
- St. Mary's Episcopal Church, 26 St. Mary's Road
- Union Chapel in the Grove, interdenominational, Bay Avenue, in Shelter Island Heights. Open June–September.

The Methodist camp, Camp Quinipet, located at the northwestern tip of the island, is used as a camp in the summer and as a retreat center for churches throughout the year.

== Education ==
The school district for the entire town is Shelter Island Union Free School District.

== Cemeteries ==
There are six cemeteries on Shelter Island:

- Emily F. French Memorial Cemetery, Thomas Street
- Our Lady of the Isle Cemetery, Roman Catholic, Manhanset Road
- Quaker Cemetery, Quakers, near Gardiner’s Creek/Friends Meeting House
- St. Mary's Episcopal Church Cemetery, 26 St. Mary’s Road
- Shelter Island Churchyard Cemetery, New York State Route 114
- The Nicoll Family Cemetery, within the bounds of the Mashomack Preserve

== Notable people ==
- Faith Baldwin (1893–1978) – romance novel author. She wrote about 100 books from 1925 until her death. Baldwin was part of the Famous Writers School. Before World War II, Baldwin spent time in a Shelter Island cottage in what was called Hilo Farms.
- Hugh Carey (1919–2011) – politician and attorney. Beginning in 1960, Carey served seven terms in the US House of Representatives as a Democrat. He served two full terms as governor of New York from 1975 to 1982. Carey owned a home in Westmoreland Farms and later acquired a large property in the Shorewood section (previously owned by Jack and Jeanne Garr) which was used by members of his very large extended family.
- Elbert N. Carvel (1910–2005) – served as 61st and 64th governor of Delaware; born on Shelter Island.
- John Chamberlain (1927–2011) – sculptor, known for sculptures from old automobiles and expressing Abstract Expressionist style of painting in three dimensions.
- Francis P. Chiaramonte, M.D. (1928–2013) – founder of Southern Maryland Hospital Center in Clinton, Maryland, a urological surgeon, and philanthropist
- Simon Doonan – English-born creative director of Barney’s retail store. Newspaper columnist and author of Confessions of a Window Dresser, Nasty: My Family and Other Varmints, and Wacky Chicks: Life Lessons from Fearlessly Inappropriate and Fabulously Eccentric Women.
- Douglas Kent Hall (1938–2008) – American writer and photographer. During his time on Shelter Island, on Little Ram Island Drive, he wrote the best-selling biography of Arnold Schwarzenegger, Arnold: The Education of a Bodybuilder, with Schwarzenegger.
- Mary Gardiner Horsford (1824–1855) – American poet.
- Otto Kahn (1867–1934) – German-born financier. Beginning in 1924, Kahn owned property in what is now Mashomack Nature Preserve.
- Julie Kavner (1950–) – actress. The voice of Marge on The Simpsons, she has also appeared in several films.
- Robert Lipsyte (1938–) – sportswriter for The New York Times and successful author of books for young readers. Lipsyte won an Emmy award for the public affairs show The Eleventh Hour.
- Aileen Osofsky (1926–2010) – member of the ACBL Hall of Fame after over 20 years as its Goodwill Committee chair. With her husband, commissioned Norman Jaffe to build their dream home on Hay Beach in 1969—now considered his signature work.
- Itzhak Perlman (1945–) – Israeli-born violinist and Grammy Award winner. In 1996, Perlman and wife Toby founded the Perlman Music Program on Shelter Island. It offers gifted young string players a summer residential course in chamber music; students perform regular concerts on the island.
- Lynn Riggs (1899–1954) Mixed-blood Cherokee author, poet and playwright. He moved to Shelter Island after his play Green Grow the Lilacs was adapted as the musical Oklahoma! in 1943.
- Leon Uris (1924–2003) – novelist. Uris lived on Shelter Island for a time on Chase Creek.
- Bruce Wolosoff (1955–) – classical composer

== In popular culture ==
- Shelter Island was the site of the 1947 Shelter Island Conference on quantum mechanics, attended by international scientists to discuss modern physics.
- Author John Steinbeck began his 1960 cross-country journey by leaving his home in Sag Harbor and driving to Shelter Island. This was the start of the trip that became his book Travels with Charley: In Search of America.
- Brian DePalma's early film The Wedding Party, was filmed on Shelter Island in 1963.
- The feature film The Dain Curse starring James Coburn was filmed on Shelter Island in 1977, with many residents playing small roles.
- The feature film Margot at the Wedding was shot in the spring of 2006 in various New York locations including Shelter Island.
- The feature film, Shelter Island, directed by Geoffrey Schaaf, starring Ally Sheedy, Stephen Baldwin, and Chris Penn, had locations including Shelter Island.
- The movie Masquerade, starring Rob Lowe and Meg Tilly, was partially filmed on Shelter Island in 1987.
- Shelter Island serves as the fictional backdrop for the Will & Grace Season 7 Episode 16 "Dance Cards & Greeting Cards" in 2005.
- "Shelter Island" was the episode in How I Met Your Mother in which Ted Mosby and Stella Zinman were meant to have married.

== See also ==
- National Register of Historic Places listings in Shelter Island (town), New York
