= Aggressor =

Aggressor may refer to:

- Aggressor (And One album), 2003
- Aggressor (Ektomorf album), 2014
- HMS Aggressor, two Royal Navy ships
- USS Aggressor, two US Navy ships
- Aggressor squadron, a US military unit acting as an opponent in wargames
- Aggressor (novel), a 2005 novel by Andy McNab
- Aggressor (horse), a Thoroughbred racehorse
- Aggressor, former name of the Estonian rock band, No-Big-Silence

== See also ==
- Aggression (disambiguation)
- Aggressive (disambiguation)
