= USS Adamant (AMc-62) =

Minesweeper of the United States Navy

History

United States
- Name: USS Adamant
- Ordered: as USS Advance
- Builder: Greenport Basin and Construction Company
- Laid down: 31 March 1941
- Launched: 7 June 1941
- Commissioned: 26 September 1941
- Renamed: USS Adamant, 17 May 1941
- Stricken: 8 January 1946
- Fate: Sold for scrapping, 3 March 1947

General characteristics
- Class & type: Accentor-class minesweeper
- Displacement: 185 long tons (188 t)
- Length: 97 ft 1 in (29.59 m)
- Beam: 22 ft (6.7 m)
- Draft: 9 ft (2.7 m)
- Speed: 10 knots (19 km/h; 12 mph)
- Complement: 17
- Armament: 2 × .50 cal (12.7 mm) machine guns

USS Adamant (AMc-62) was an Accentor-class minesweeper in the United States Navy during World War II.

Adamant was laid down on 31 March 1941 at Greenport, Long Island, New York, by the Greenport Basin and Construction Company as USS Advance; renamed Adamant on 17 May 1941; launched on 7 June 1941; sponsored by Mrs. Kelly Hunter, a niece of Secretary of the Treasury Henry Morgenthau Jr.; and placed in service on 26 September 1941 at the New York Navy Yard.

== World War II East Coast operations ==
The coastal minesweeper completed fitting out at Brooklyn, New York, before getting underway on 23 October 1941 for Hampton Roads, Virginia. She arrived at Norfolk the following day and reported for duty to the Commandant, 5th Naval District. She completed shakedown training in Chesapeake Bay and, on 13 November, began duty with the 5th Naval District Inshore Patrol forces. She operated in and around Norfolk until late May 1944 when she was reassigned to the 1st Naval District. She arrived at Boston, Massachusetts on 29 May 1944 and served in New England coastal waters until June 1945. On 18 June 1945, Adamant departed Boston for Charleston, South Carolina. She arrived at her destination on 28 June and served for almost six months in the 6th Naval District.

== Decommissioning ==
On 18 December 1945, the minesweeper was placed out of service at Charleston. Although her name was struck from the Navy List on 8 January 1946, the former warship remained in Navy custody at Charleston for another 14 months. On 3 March 1947 she was sold to Mr. Lloyd Lambert of Baltimore, Maryland for scrapping.

== Note ==
While still on the building ways, USS Adamant (AMc-61) was renamed USS Acme (AMc-61) on 17 May 1941.
