= USS Ardent (SP-680) =

Patrol vessel of the United States Navy

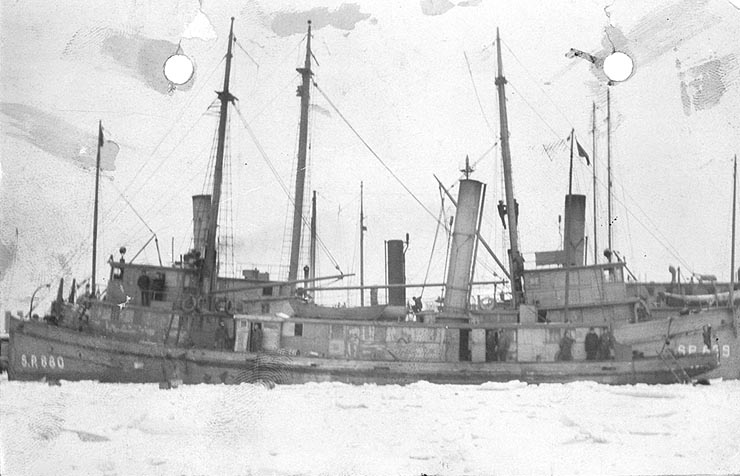
- USS Ardent (SP-680) in an icy port in southern New England sometime between 1917 and 1919. Behind her is the patrol vessel and minesweeper USS Eugene F. Price (SP-839).

History

United States
- Name: USS Ardent
- Namesake: Previous name retained
- Builder: Greenport Basin and Construction Company, Greenport, New York
- Completed: 1902
- Acquired: 11 June 1917
- Commissioned: 15 August 1917
- Decommissioned: early 1921
- Fate: Sold 16 May 1921 or June 1921
- Notes: Operated as commercial fishing vessel Ardent 1902-1917

General characteristics
- Type: Patrol vessel
- Tonnage: 106 gross register tons
- Displacement: 293 tons
- Length: 106 ft 2 in (32.36 m)
- Beam: 22 ft (6.7 m)
- Draft: 5 ft 6 in (1.68 m)
- Propulsion: Steam engine
- Speed: 10 knots
- Complement: 20
- Armament: 2 × 1-pounder guns

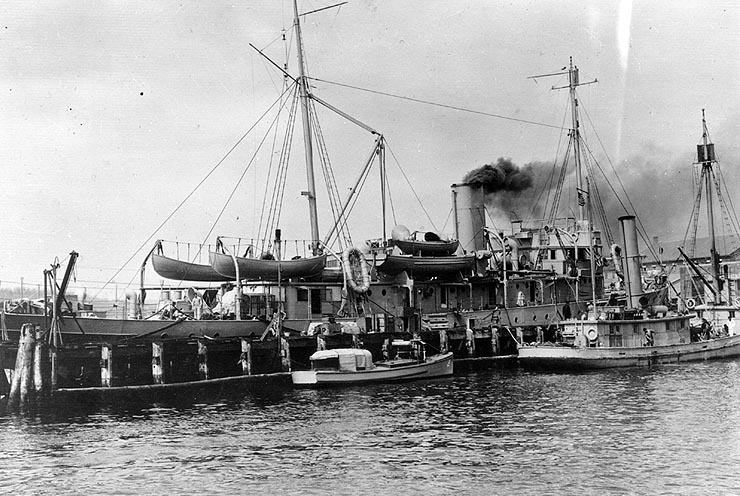
The submarine tender USS Fulton (Submarine Tender No. 1) is the large ship in this photograph taken at Submarine Base New London, Groton, Connecticut, during World War I. A motor launch is in the center foreground and USS Ardent (SP-680) is at right.

The first USS Ardent (SP-680) was a United States Navy patrol vessel and minesweeper in commission from 1917 to 1921. Acquired upon the entry of the United States into World War I, the ship served in New England during the war, and was sold back into private ownership in 1921.

== Service history ==
Ardent was built as a commercial fishing steamer by the Greenport Basin and Construction Company at Greenport on Long Island, New York, in 1902. On 11 June 1917, the U.S. Navy purchased her from Raymond J. Anderson of Newport, Rhode Island, for use as a section patrol boat and minesweeper during World War I. She was commissioned on 15 August 1917 as USS Ardentand was given the hull number SP-680.

Following the purchase of the vessel, Ardent was fitted out as a minesweeper for coastal service. Following her conversion, Ardent was assigned to the Mining Force of the 2nd Naval District in southern New England. Ardent conducted patrol and minesweeping duties, and also was used for tending submarine nets in the Newport and Block Island sections for the duration of her World War I service.

In 1919, following the end of the war, Ardent was reassigned to Submarine Base New London at Groton, Connecticut. There the ship was used in work on the development of torpedoes for submarine usage, operating in this capacity until 1921.

Early in 1921, Ardent was decommissioned, and put up for sale. Later that year, she was sold to Wigo Rasmussen of Brooklyn, New York, on 16 May 1921 or in June 1921.
