= USS Beluga =

Patrol vessel of the United States Navy

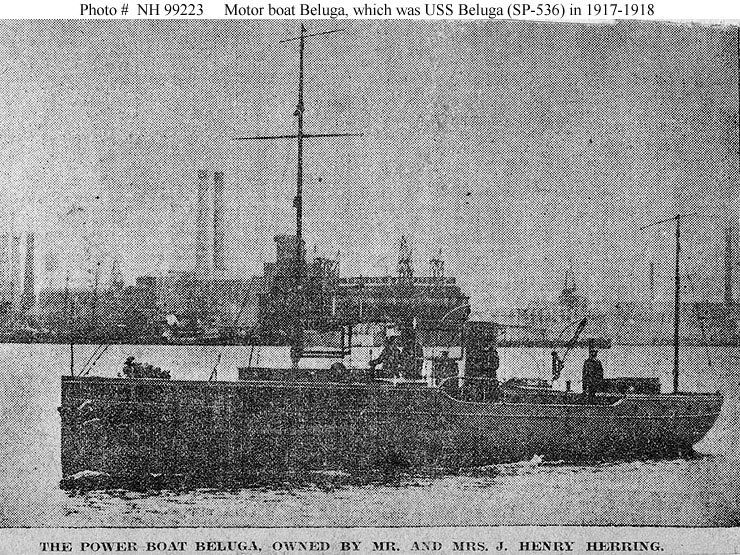
- Beluga as a private motorboat sometime before the United States entered World War I.

History

United States
- Name: USS Beluga
- Namesake: Previous name retained
- Builder: Greenport Basin & Construction Company, Greenport, New York
- Completed: 1911
- Acquired: 14 May 1917
- Commissioned: 15 May 1917
- Stricken: 25 November 1918
- Fate: Returned to owner
- Notes: Operated as private motorboat Gaviota and Beluga 1911-1917 and Beluga from 1919

General characteristics
- Type: Patrol vessel
- Tonnage: 42 gross register tons
- Length: 73 ft (22 m)
- Beam: 13 ft 9 in (4.19 m)
- Draft: 4 ft 6 in (1.37 m) aft
- Speed: 12 knots
- Complement: 10
- Armament: 1 × 1-pounder gun; 2 × machine guns

USS Beluga (SP-536) was a United States Navy patrol vessel in commission from 1917 to 1918.

Beluga was built in 1911 as a private motorboat Gaviota by the Greenport Basin & Construction Company at Greenport on Long Island, New York. She later was renamed Beluga.

On 14 May 1917, the U.S. Navy acquired Beluga under a free lease from her owner, Mr. J. Henry Herring of New Bedford, Massachusetts, for use as a section patrol vessel during World War I. She was commissioned as USS Beluga (SP-536) on 15 May 1917.

Assigned to the 2nd Naval District in southern New England, Beluga operated on patrol duties in the coastal waters around the section bases at Newport, Rhode Island, and New Bedford for the rest of World War I.

Beluga was stricken from the Navy Directory on 25 November 1918 and returned to Herring.
