= USS Eugene =

USS Eugene has been the name of one United States Navy ship, but there have been three other U.S. Navy ships which have been named after individuals whose first name was Eugene:

- USS Eugene (PF-40), a patrol frigate in commission from 1944 to 1946.
- USS Eugene A. Greene (DD-711), a destroyer in commission from 1945 to 1972
- USS Eugene E. Elmore (DE-686), a destroyer escort in commission from 1943 to 1946
- USS Eugene F. Price (SP-839), a patrol vessel and minesweeper in commission from 1917 to 1919
