= Sea otter (disambiguation) =

The sea otter (Enhydra lutris) is a marine mammal that primarily lives on the northern coasts of the Pacific Ocean.

- Other species in the otter subfamily (Lutrinae) are sometimes mistakenly referred to as "sea otters" when seen near coastal areas. These include the Eurasian otter (Lutra lutra) and the North American river otter (Lontra canadensis)

Sea otter may also refer to:

- Sea Otter Classic, a bicycling sports festival in Monterey, California, in the United States
- Sea Otter Cove, a remote place near the north-western end of Vancouver Island in British Columbia, Canada
- Sea Otter Rocks, rocks of the Commander Islands in the Bering Sea
- Supermarine Sea Otter, a British flying boat of the late 1930s and 1940s
- USS Sea Otter (SP-781), a United States Navy patrol boat in commission from 1917 to 1919
- USS Sea Otter I (IX-51), a United States Navy experimental auxiliary ship in commission from July to November 1941
- USS Sea Otter II (IX-53), a United States Navy experimental auxiliary ship in commission from 1941 to 1942

== See also ==
- Otter (disambiguation)
