= USS Avalon (1908) =

Patrol vessel of the United States Navy

History

United States
- Name: USS Avalon
- Namesake: Previous name retained
- Builder: Greenport Basin & Construction Company, Greenport, New York
- Completed: 1908
- Acquired: 19 May 1917
- Commissioned: No record of commissioning
- Stricken: 22 December 1918
- Fate: Returned to owner 22 December 1918
- Notes: Operated as civilian motorboat Avalon 1908-1917 and from 1918

General characteristics
- Type: Patrol vessel
- Tonnage: 14 or 16 Gross register tons
- Length: 46 ft 0 in (14.02 m)
- Beam: 10 ft 6 in (3.20 m)
- Draft: 3 ft 1 in (0.94 m) mean
- Speed: 8.6 knots

The first USS Avalon was a United States Navy patrol vessel acquired in 1917 but possibly never commissioned.

Avalon was built in 1908 as the private motorboat Usona by the Greenport Basin & Construction Company at Greenport, New York. She later was renamed Avalon.

In 1917, the U.S. Navy inspected Avalon for possible naval service during World War I. On 19 May 1917 officials of the 3rd Naval District took control of her for use as a section patrol boat.

Avalon's name was placed on the Navy List, but she never received a section patrol (SP) number and no records have been found showing her to have been commissioned or describing any naval service by Avalon. However, she appears to have remained in Navy custody until 22 December 1918, when she was stricken from the Navy List. The Navy returned her to her owner the same day.
