= Riette =

Riette may refer to:

- Riëtte Fledderus (Emmy Henriëtte "Riëtte" Fledderus) (b. 1977), a Dutch volleyball player
- USS Riette (SP-107), a United States Navy patrol boat in commission from 1917 to 1919
