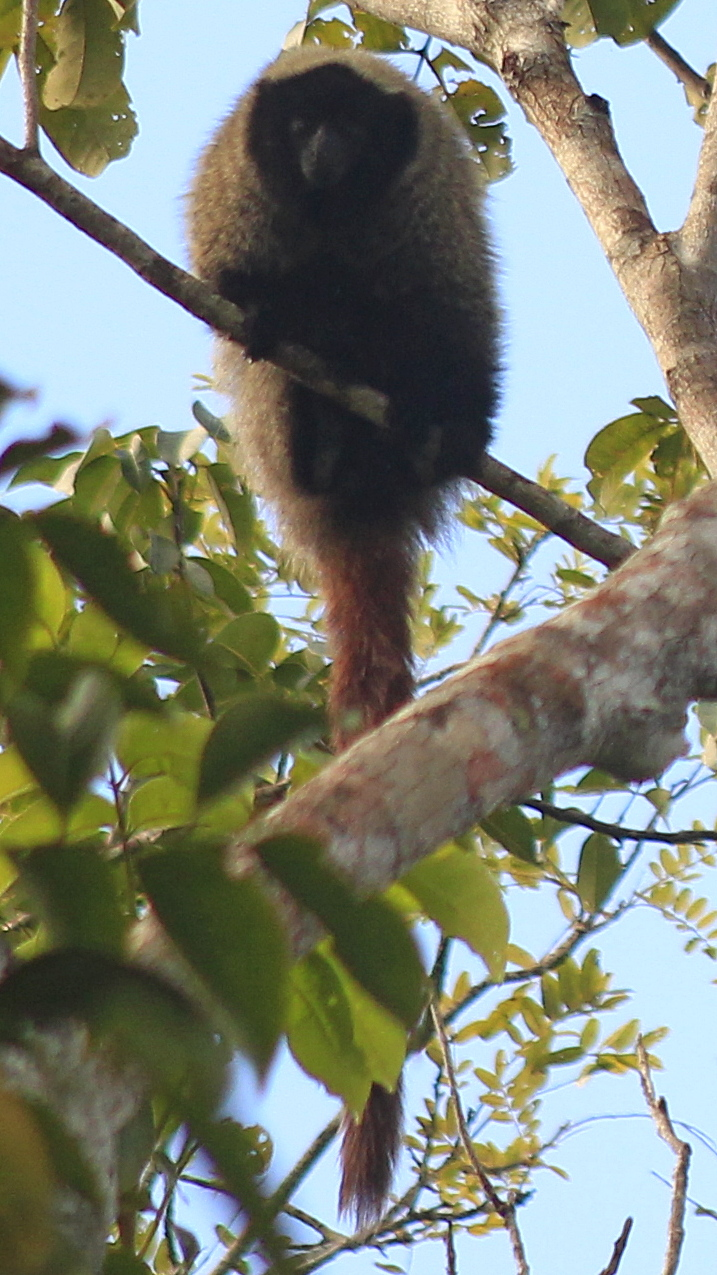

Conservation status
- Endangered (IUCN 3.1)

Scientific classification
- Kingdom: Animalia
- Phylum: Chordata
- Class: Mammalia
- Order: Primates
- Family: Pitheciidae
- Genus: Callicebus
- Species: C. coimbrai

Binomial name
- Callicebus coimbrai Kobayashi & Langguth, 1999
- Geographic range

= Coimbra Filho's titi monkey =

Coimbra Filho's titi

Species of New World monkey

Coimbra Filho's titi monkey (Callicebus coimbrai) or just Coimbra's titi is a species of titi, a type of New World monkey, endemic to forests in the Brazilian states of Bahia and Sergipe. It was first discovered by Shuji Kobayashi. It is considered one of the most endangered of all Neotropical primates. It is named after Adelmar F. Coimbra-Filho, founder and Former Director of the Rio de Janeiro Primate Centre, in honor of his work in the field of Brazilian primatology and biology.

== Physical description ==
The most distinct of Coimbra Filho's titi's features, from other members of the personatus group, include its black forehead, crown, and ear area, as well as a zebra-like pattern on the anterior of its back. Coimbra Filho's titi is also differentiated from other members of the personatus group by the shape of both its skull and its teeth. Compared to other members of its group, the skull is smaller, and shaped slightly differently. Its teeth are also more U-shaped, as opposed to the more V-shaped teeth exhibited by other members of the personatus group. It also features different dental topography on its upper first and second molars when compared to other members of the group.

== Habitat and distribution ==
The preferred habitat for Coimbra Filho's titi consists of densely wooded areas, preferring the dense understory and lower canopy. However, it is able to survive in damaged or fragmented forests, which currently comprise a large portion of its range. This is due to a tolerance to highly disturbed areas, as well as the ability to subsist in areas composed primarily of young or second growth forests. While other species in Callicebus are native to many areas of South America from Colombia to Brazil, Peru and north Paraguay, Coimbra Filho's titi is found only in a very small area in the states of Bahia and Sergipe in coastal northeastern Brazil.

== Behavior ==
Coimbra Filho's titi, like most titis, is a folivore-frugivore, with a diet consisting mostly of leaves, but also including various fruits.

Coimbra Filho's titi generally lives in small groups consisting of three to five members. Such a group generally contains a breeding pair and its direct offspring that have yet to reach sexual maturity. However, upon reaching sexual maturity, individuals leave their natal groups, and often immigrate to new areas. Their range size varies, with some occurrences recorded of ranges as small as 2 ha (4.9 acres), and others larger than 20 ha (49 acres). Coimbra Filho's titi has also been noted to exhibit extreme territorial and defensive behavior when threatened.

== Conservation ==
Coimbra Filho's titi is currently considered endangered on the IUCN Redlist due to a variety of threats, both natural and anthropogenic, including habitat loss, habitat fragmentation, limited reproductive options, and increased predation. The primary biological threat to Coimbra Filho's titi comes from its mating behavior. While juvenile members of the species remain in their natal groups, upon sexual maturity they leave and set off upon their own. Coupled with the habitat fragmentation faced by the species, this behavior limits the number of sexually mature individuals in each fragment of the population, limiting reproductive options. The species' natural geographical distribution also contributes a threat to the species. Coimbra Filho's titi only naturally occurs in the Atlantic coastal forests in northeastern Brazil. This is a relatively small area in the states of Sergipe and Bahia. Due to this small range, any disturbances to these areas pose a larger than normal threat to the species' survival. More than anything else, however, human interference is the source of many problems to Coimbra Filho's titi. The areas around and inside its habitat are being developed, including paving roads and the promotion of tourism. Similarly, it is facing habitat loss due to increased logging in the area. Wooded areas inhabited by Coimbra Filho's Titi are also being rapidly converted into pastures for grazing and ranching. By the early 1900s, the coastal forests in Sergipe had been reduced to less than 40% of the size of their original cover. This trend continued throughout the 20th century, and these coastal forests now cover less than 1% of their original size. These activities are leading to increased habitat fragmentation. This fragmentation limits the size of breeding populations, limiting genetic diversity. This fragmentation also increases the risk of predation, as titis are forced to move from one fragment to another, exposing them to increased risk of predation.

Coimbra Filho's titi was placed on Brazil's Official List of Threatened Fauna in 2003, managed by the Committee for the Conservation and Management of the Primates of the Northern Atlantic Forest and Caatinga. This organization is responsible for studying the current status and threats to the species, as well as developing and managing a plan for the species conservation.

As of 2005, no attempts have been made at beginning a captive breeding program for the species, despite an estimated wild population of only 500 to 1000 individuals remaining.

Current studies have shown that due to the species relatively large number of populations, as well as its tolerance to habitat loss and fragmentation, the species has a positive outlook. However action must be taken to prevent further habitat loss and fragmentation from threatening the species, as well as the implementation of plans to aid in the species' sustainability.
