= USS Aggressor =

Two ships of the United States Navy have been assigned the name Aggressor.

- USS Aggressor (AMc-63) was an Accentor-class coastal minesweeper. She was renamed USS Advance (AMc-63) on 23 May 1941 while under construction. Advance was launched on 28 June 1941 and stricken on 3 January 1946.
- USS Alliance (AMc-64) was an Accentor-class coastal minesweeper. She was renamed USS Aggressor (AMc-64) on 23 May 1941 while under construction. Aggressor was launched on 19 July 1941 and stricken on 21 January 1946.
