= USS Fulmar (AMc-46) =

Minesweeper of the United States Navy

History

United States
- Name: USS Fulmar
- Builder: Greenport Basin and Construction Company
- Laid down: date unknown
- Launched: 25 February 1941
- Commissioned: 25 June 1941
- Decommissioned: 4 January 1946
- Out of service: date unknown
- Stricken: date unknown
- Fate: fate unknown

General characteristics
- Displacement: 185 tons
- Length: 97 ft 1 in (29.59 m)
- Beam: 22 ft (6.7 m)
- Draught: 8 ft 6 in (2.59 m)
- Speed: 10.0 knots
- Complement: 17
- Armament: two .50 cal (12.7 mm) machine guns

USS Fulmar (AMc-46) was an Accentor-class coastal minesweeper acquired by the U.S. Navy for the dangerous task of removing mines from minefields laid in the water to prevent ships from passing.

The first ship to be named Fulmar by the Navy, AMc-46 was launched 25 February 1941 by Greenport Basin and Construction Company, Greenport, Long Island, New York; sponsored by Mrs. A. V. Walters; and commissioned 25 June 1941.

== World War II service ==
Fulmar carried out minesweeping operations out of Newport, Rhode Island, and from September 1941, out of Portland, Maine, until arriving at Miami, Florida, 21 September 1944. There she acted as target for motor torpedo boats undergoing training for the next year.

== Deactivation ==
Arriving at Charleston, South Carolina, 1 October 1945, Fulmar was decommissioned 4 January 1946 and transferred to the Maritime Commission for disposal 16 September 1946.
