= USS Condor (AMS-5) =

Minesweeper of the United States Navy

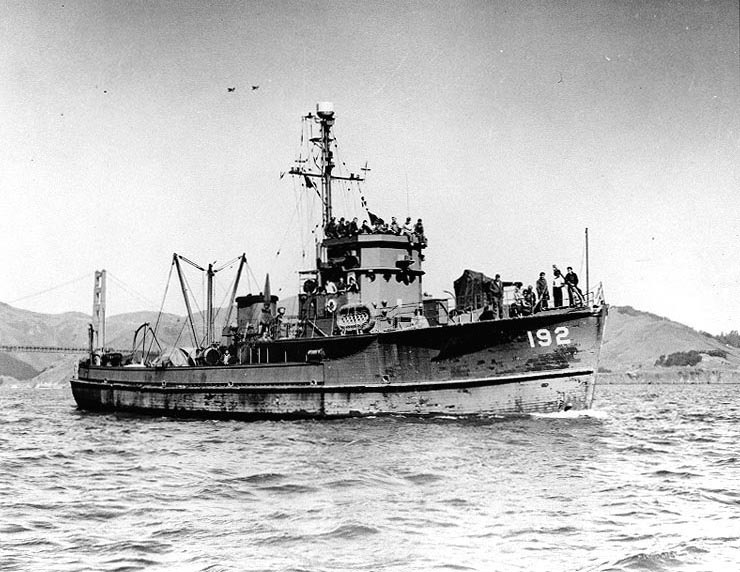
- USS YMS-192 in San Francisco Bay after World War II, c. April 1946. The minesweeper was later renamed Condor (AMS-5).

History

United States
- Name: USS YMS-192
- Builder: Greenport Basin and Construction Co.; Greenport, New York
- Laid down: 30 September 1942
- Launched: 5 December 1942
- Completed: 13 June 1943
- Commissioned: 13 June 1943
- Decommissioned: May 1946
- Renamed: USS Condor (AMS-5), 18 February 1947
- Namesake: the condor bird
- Recommissioned: November 1950
- Reclassified: MSC(O)-5, 7 February 1955
- Fate: Transferred to Japan, March 1955
- Acquired: returned from Japan, early 1967
- Stricken: 31 March 1967
- Fate: Sunk as a target, August 1968

History

Japan
- Name: JDS Ujishima (MSC-655)
- Acquired: March 1955
- Fate: Returned to U.S., early 1967

General characteristics
- Class & type: YMS-135 subclass of YMS-1-class minesweepers
- Displacement: 270 tons
- Length: 136 ft (41 m)
- Beam: 24 ft 6 in (7.47 m)
- Draft: 8 ft (2.4 m)
- Propulsion: 2 × 880 bhp General Motors 8-268A diesel engines; 2 shafts
- Speed: 15 kts
- Complement: 32
- Armament: 1 × 3"/50 caliber dual purpose gun mount; 2 × 20 mm guns; 2 × depth charge projectors

USS Condor (MSC(O)-5/AMS-5/YMS-192) was a YMS-1-class minesweeper of the YMS-135 subclass built for the United States Navy during World War II. She was the second U.S. Navy ship named for the condor.

== History ==
Condor was laid down as YMS-192 on 30 September 1942 by the Greenport Basin and Construction Co. of Greenport, Long Island, New York; launched, 5 December 1942; completed and commissioned USS YMS-192, 13 June 1943.

YMS-192 served along the U.S. East Coast and in the Caribbean until the Atlantic War ended in May 1945. Sent to the Pacific, she took part in post-war mine clearance operations off Japan. YMS-192 returned to the U.S. in April 1946 and was decommissioned in May. While laid up in reserve at San Diego, California, she was reclassified as a Motor Minesweeper, AMS-5 and named USS Condor 18 February 1947.

Recommissioned for Korean War service in November 1950, Condor deployed to the combat zone in March 1951. She provided minesweeping and patrol services off Korea and Japan to the end of the conflict in July 1953 and continued her activities in that area during the following years.

Condor was reclassified as coastal minesweeper MSC(O)-5 on 7 February 1955. Condor was loaned to Japan a month later. She was renamed JDS Ujishima (MSC-655) during her service with the Japanese Maritime Self-Defense Force.

Condor was returned to the U.S. Navy in early 1967, and struck from the Naval Vessel Register on 31 March 1967. The veteran minesweeper was sunk as a target in August 1968.
