= USS Iona (YTB-220) =

Tugboat of the United States Navy

- A drawing of Iona

History
- Name: Iona (YTB-220)
- Builder: Greenport Basin and Construction Company, Greenport, N.Y
- Launched: 26 August 1944
- Sponsored by: Mrs. Martina E. Swanson
- In service: 2 February 1945
- Reclassified: YTM-220 in February 1962
- Out of service: May 1963
- Fate: Burnt in June, 1963, following sinking in May.

General characteristics
- Class & type: Cahto-class district harbor tug
- Displacement: 410 long tons (417 t)
- Length: 110 ft (34 m)
- Beam: 27 ft (8.2 m)
- Draft: 11 ft (3.4 m)
- Speed: 12 knots (22 km/h; 14 mph)
- Complement: 12
- Armament: 2 × .50-caliber machine guns

Iona (YT/YTB/YTM-220), a wooden tugboat originally classified YT-220, was launched by Greenport Basin and Construction Company, Greenport, New York, 26 August 1944; sponsored by Mrs. Martina E. Swanson; and placed in service 2 February 1945. She was the second United States Navy ship of that name.

The new tug was assigned harbor duty in the 14th Naval District based at Pearl Harbor, and she remained there until transferred to the Philippines in 1955. At Subic Bay Iona performed harbor duties necessary for the smooth functioning of a naval base. She was reclassified a 'District Harbor Tug Medium', YTM-220, in February 1962. In June, 1963, following an accidental sinking in May, she was disposed of by burning.
