= USS Lorikeet (AMc-49) =

Minesweeper of the United States Navy

History

United States
- Builder: Greenport Basin and Construction Company
- Laid down: 28 February 1941
- Launched: 19 April 1941
- Commissioned: 8 August 1941
- Decommissioned: 14 December 1945
- Stricken: 8 January 1946
- Fate: Sold, 31 July 1947

General characteristics
- Displacement: 185 tons
- Length: 97 ft 1 in (29.59 m)
- Beam: 22 ft (6.7 m)
- Draft: 8 ft 6 in (2.59 m)
- Speed: 10.0 knots
- Complement: 17
- Armament: two .30 cal (7.62 mm) machine guns

USS Lorikeet (AMc-49) was an Accentor-class coastal minesweeper acquired by the U.S. Navy for the dangerous task of removing mines from minefields laid in the water to prevent ships from passing.

The first ship to be named Lorikeet by the Navy was laid down by Greenport Basin and Construction Company, Greenport, Long Island, New York, 28 February 1941; launched 19 April; sponsored by Miss Mildred Howard; and commissioned 8 August 1941.

Attached to the Inshore Patrol, Lorikeet was based at Staten Island for sweeping operations to keep vital New York Harbor free from the menace of enemy mines. In November 1944 she was transferred to the 1st Naval District and swept the sealanes approaching Boston, Massachusetts.

As World War II closed, she arrived Charleston, South Carolina, 8 August 1945. Lorikeet decommissioned there 14 December, was struck from the Navy list 8 January 1946, and was turned over to the Maritime Commission. She was sold to Karl H. Anderson of Atlantic Beach, Florida, 31 July 1947 and was subsequently sold to Nassau Fertilizer & Oil Co., Inc., Fernandina, Florida.
