= Greenport Basin and Construction Company =

Shipbuilder in the United States

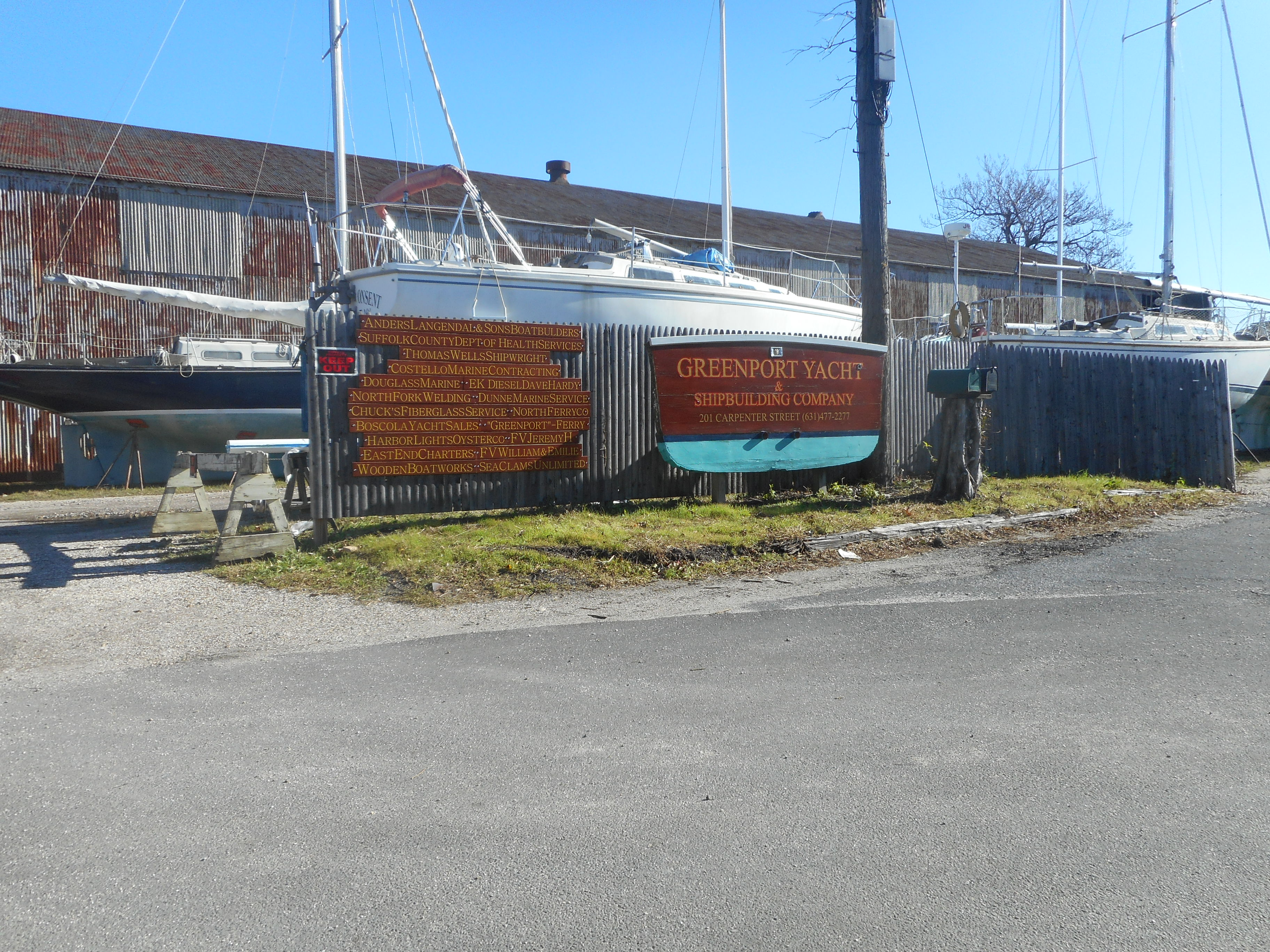
Sign for what is today the Greenport Yacht and Shipbuilding Company, taken in November 2017.

The Greenport Basin and Construction Company, known by various names throughout its history, but most recently named the Greenport Yacht & Shipbuilding Company, is a shipbuilder in Greenport, Suffolk County, New York. It was established in the 19th century by brothers Pliny C. Brigham and Theodore W. Brigham. One local history relates:

Greenport prospered due to the menhaden industry; 64 boats were in service and seven under construction in 1879. By this time, shipbuilding (pleasure craft, cargo vessels, fishing vessels) boomed in Greenport. The Greenport Basin and Construction Company, famous yacht builders, became a large repair and docking facility for menhaden vessels. (Today, the company is known as Greenport Yacht and Shipbuilding.) Menhaden vessels or "bunker boats" were said to have lined the shoreline along Main and Front Streets.

The company built dozens of ships for the United States Navy during World War I and World War II, as well as building yachts for private customers. In 1917 the company became involved in a tax case against the United States, in which it protested the assessment of an "excess profits" tax. The case made its way to the U.S. Supreme Court, where the company finally lost the decision in 1923. In 1970, the company was acquired by Stephen Clarke, and thereafter turned its attention from ship construction to ship maintenance and repairs, and historic preservation of ships.

== Ships built or converted ==
Notable ships built by the company include:

Ship	Type	Year
USS Acme (AMc-61)	minesweeper	1941
USS Adamant (AMc-62)	minesweeper	1941
USS Advance (AMc-63)	minesweeper	1941
USS Aggressor (AMc-64)	minesweeper	1941
USS Alarka (YTB-229)	tugboat	1944
USS Ardent (SP-680)	minesweeper	1902
USS Atlantis (SP-40)	motorboat	1911
USS Avalon (1908)	patrol vessel	1908
USS Beluga (SP-536)	patrol vessel	1911
USS Chingachgook (SP-35)	motorboat	1916
USS Condor (AMS-5)	minesweeper	1942
USS Fulmar (AMc-46)	minesweeper	1941
USS Hatak (YTB-219)	tugboat	1944
USS Iona (YTB-220)	tugboat	1944
USS Jacamar (AMc-47)	tugboat	1941
USS Lark (AMS-23)	minesweeper	1943
USS Limpkin (AMc-48)	minesweeper	1941
USS Lorikeet (AMc-49)	minesweeper	1941
USS Patrol No. 10 (SP-85)	motorboat	1917
USS Perfecto (SP-86)	motorboat	1917
USS Quest (SP-171)	patrol vessel	1916
USS Sea Gull (SP-544)	yacht	1902
USS Uncas (SP-689)	motorboat	1917
USS Vitesse (SP-1192)	patrol vessel	1917
USS Vamanos	ketch	1968
USS Whippet (SP-89)	motorboat	1917

In addition, the USS Patriot (PYc-47), built in 1930 by the Herreshoff Manufacturing Company in Bristol, Rhode Island, was converted for Navy service as a submarine chaser by Greenport Basin and Construction Company, in 1940.
