= Vitesse =

Vitesse may refer to:

- Vitesse Models, a diecast model car company
- Vitesse (band), Dutch rock band
- Bugatti Veyron Grand Sport Vitesse, a car
- Rover 216 Vitesse, a car
- Rover 3500 Vitesse, a car
- Rover 800 Vitesse, a car
- Triumph Vitesse, a car
- SBV Vitesse, a Dutch football club from Arnhem
- Vitesse Dallas, an American soccer club
- SV Vitesse, a football club from the Netherlands Antilles
- USS Vitesse (SP-1192), a United States Navy patrol vessel in commission from 1917 to 1918
- Vitesse Semiconductor, an American company that produces semiconductor solutions for Carrier and Enterprise networks

== See also ==
- VITESS, software package for the simulation of neutron scattering experiments.
