= USS Riette =

Patrol vessel of the United States Navy

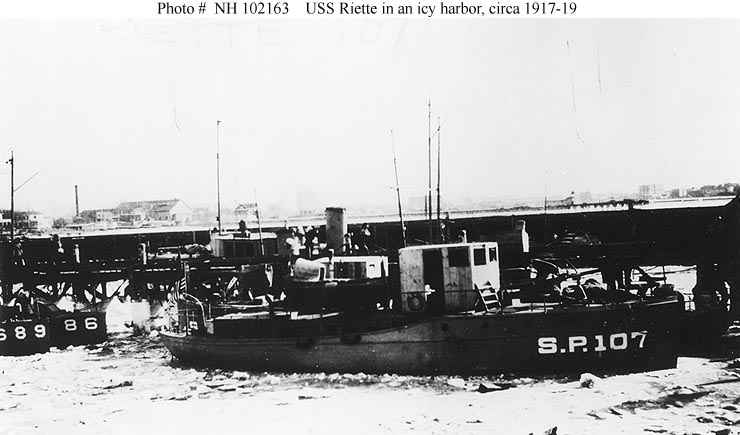
- USS Riette in an icy harbor sometime between 1917 and 1919. Patrol boats USS Uncas (SP-689) and USS Perfecto (SP-86) are partially visible at left.

History

United States
- Name: USS Riette
- Namesake: Previous name retained
- Builder: Twentieth Century Yacht, Launch, and Engine Company, Morris Heights, New York
- Completed: 1916
- Acquired: 19 May 1917
- Commissioned: 5 August 1917
- Stricken: 14 August 1919
- Fate: Sold 30 October 1919
- Notes: Operated as private motorboat Amalia III, Temegan II, and Riette 1916-1917 and Riette 1919-1958

General characteristics
- Type: Patrol vessel
- Tonnage: 29 tons
- Length: 60 ft (18 m)
- Beam: 13 ft 6 in (4.11 m)
- Draft: 3 ft 8 in (1.12 m)
- Depth of hold: 5 ft 5 in (1.65 m)
- Speed: 11 knots
- Complement: 12
- Armament: 1 × 1-pounder gun; 1 × machine gun

USS Riette (SP-107) was an armed motorboat that served in the United States Navy as a patrol vessel from 1917 to 1919.

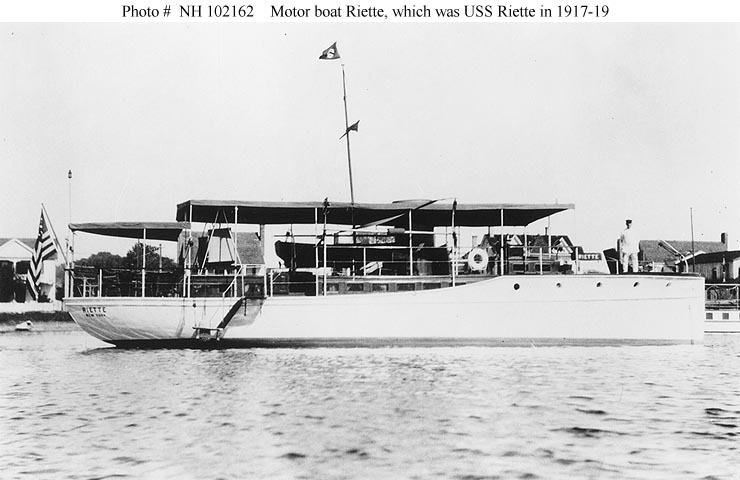
Riette as a private motorboat sometime in 1916 or 1917.

Riette was built as the civilian motorboat Amalia III in 1916 by the Twentieth Century Yacht, Launch, and Engine Company at Morris Heights, New York. She was soon renamed Temegan II and then Riette. The U.S. Navy acquired Riette from her owner, Dr. George G. Shelton of Ridgefield, Connecticut, on 19 May 1917 for use as a patrol boat during World War I. She was commissioned on 5 August 1917 as USS Riette (SP-107) at the New York Navy Yard in Brooklyn, New York.

Riette served as a patrol vessel at Base No. 3, Port Jefferson, New York, in late 1917 and at Base No. 2, Black Rock, in Bridgeport, Connecticut, from May 1918 to July 1918. From 13 August 1918 she was based at Iona Island, New York. She later provided special service for the Machinery Division at the New York Navy Yard.

Riette was decommissioned on 14 August 1919. She was sold on 30 October 1919 at Brooklyn to H. H. Miller of Brooklyn.

Re-engined in 1922 and again in 1930, Riette remained on yacht registers until 1958.
