= Chingachgook (disambiguation) =

Chingachgook is a Mohican character in James Fenimore Cooper novels, with several portrayals in film and television.

Chingachgook may also refer to:

- USS Chingachgook, a former U.S. Navy ship
- Chingachgook, die große Schlange, a 1967 East German Western film
