= Aggressive (disambiguation) =

Aggression is hostile and antagonistic behavior.

Aggressive may also refer to:

- Aggressive-class minesweeper, a class of minesweepers built for and used by the United States Navy
- USS Aggressive (MSO-422), an American minesweeper of the Aggressive class
- Aggressive (film director), a New York-based music video directing team of Alex Topaller and Daniel Shapiro
- Aggressive mood, a grammatical mood-like verb construction unique to the Finnish language
- Aggressive (album), a 2016 album by Beartooth

== See also ==
- Aggression (disambiguation)
- Aggressor (disambiguation)
