= USS Sea Otter (SP-781) =

Patrol vessel of the United States Navy

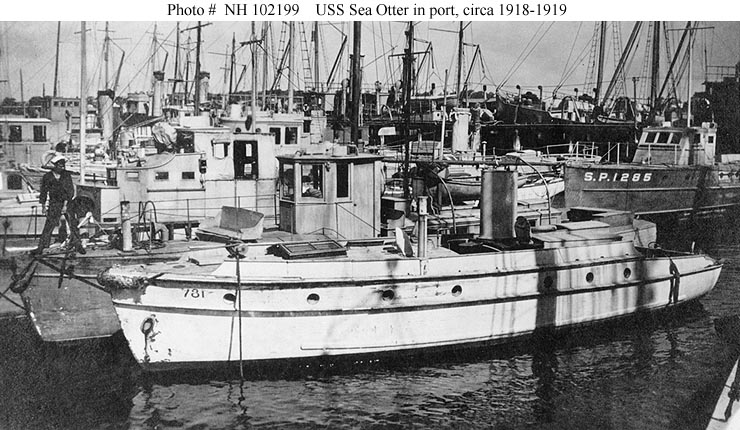
- USS Sea Otter (SP-781), probably while awaiting disposal in 1919. She is in port with many other section patrol craft, including USS Patrol No. 10 (SP-85) (second boat inboard of Sea Otter) and USS Daiquiri (SP-1285) (in right background).

History

United States
- Name: USS Sea Otter
- Namesake: Previous name retained
- Builder: Britt Brothers, Lynn, Massachusetts
- Completed: 1911 or 1913
- Acquired: 11 June 1917
- Commissioned: 11 June 1917
- Stricken: 7 November 1919
- Fate: Sold 16 January 1920
- Notes: Operated as private motorboat Sea Otter from 1911 or 1913 to 1917

General characteristics
- Type: Patrol vessel
- Tonnage: 6 Gross register tons
- Displacement: 6 tons
- Length: 40 ft (12 m)
- Beam: 10 ft 1 in (3.07 m)
- Draft: 3 ft 6 in (1.07 m)
- Speed: 10 knots (19 km/h)
- Complement: 5
- Armament: 1 × 1-pounder gun; 1 × Colt machine gun

USS Sea Otter (SP-781) was a United States Navy patrol vessel in commission from 1917 to 1919.

== Background ==
Sea Otter was built as a private wooden motorboat of the same name in either 1911 or 1913 by Britt Brothers at Lynn, Massachusetts. On 11 June 1917, the U.S. Navy acquired her from her owner, Hugh L. Willoughby of Newport, Rhode Island, for use as a section patrol boat during World War I. She was commissioned the same day as USS Sea Otter (SP-781).

Sea Otter performed transportation and supply duties in United States East Coast ports for the rest of World War I.

Decommissioned sometime after the end of the war, Sea Otter was stricken from the Navy List on 7 November 1919 and sold to Joseph Guild of Boston, Massachusetts, on 16 January 1920.
