= USS Patrol No. 10 =

Patrol vessel of the United States Navy

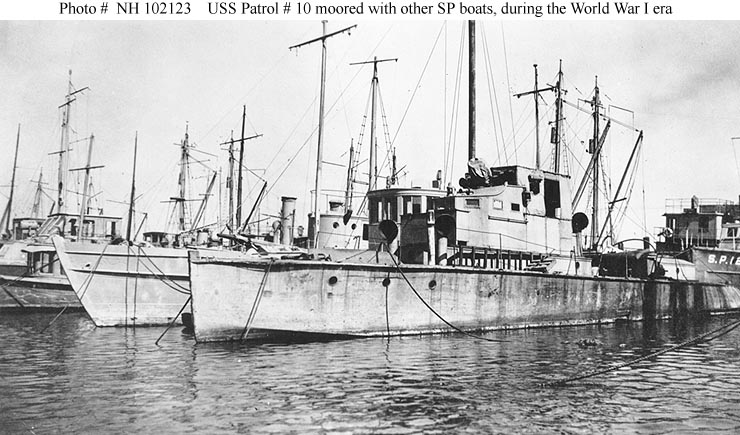
- USS Patrol No. 10 during World War I

History

United States
- Name: USS Patrol No. 10
- Builder: Greenport Basin and Construction Company, Greenport, New York
- Completed: 1917
- Acquired: 3 May 1917
- Commissioned: 3 October 1917
- Fate: Sold 5 August 1921
- Notes: Built privately as Hull No. 288 or Greenport Hull No. 288

General characteristics
- Type: Patrol vessel
- Displacement: 13 tons
- Length: 60 ft (18 m)
- Beam: 10 ft (3.0 m)
- Draft: 2 ft 2 in (0.66 m) or 3 ft (0.91 m)
- Installed power: 430 to 450 horsepower (0.32 to 0.34 megawatt)
- Propulsion: two Van Blerck gasoline engines, two shafts
- Speed: 23.5 knots or 26 knots
- Complement: 11
- Armament: 1 × 3-pounder gun; 1 × machine gun

USS Patrol No. 10 (SP-85), often rendered as USS Patrol #10, was an armed motorboat that served in the United States Navy as a patrol vessel from 1917 to 1919.

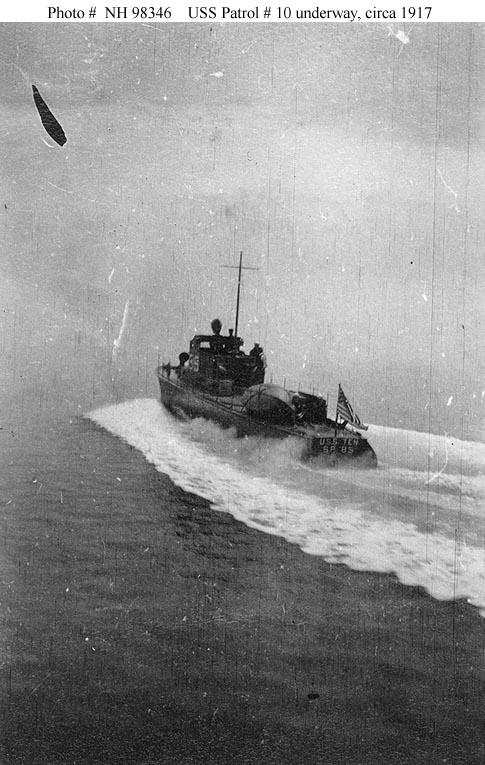
Patrol No. 10 ca. summer 1917. The name "USS Ten" is painted on her stern.

Patrol No. 10 was built privately as Hull No. 288 or Greenport Hull No. 288 in 1916 by Greenport Basin and Construction Company at Greenport on Long Island, New York. She was similar to two boats built by Greenport for Russia but taken over by the U.S. Navy: Greenport Hull No. 277, which became USS Hetman (SP-1150), and Greenport Hull 278, which became USS Russ (SP-1151).

The U.S. Navy acquired the boat on 3 May 1917 and commissioned her for service in World War I as USS Patrol No. 10 (SP-85) on 3 October 1917.

Patrol No. 10 operated in the 3rd Naval District, headquartered at New York City, on patrol throughout the United States' participation in World War I. She was decommissioned postwar and was awaiting disposal by 1919. By February 1920 she was for sale, and she was sold on 5 August 1921.
