= USS Uncas (SP-689) =

Patrol vessel of the United States Navy

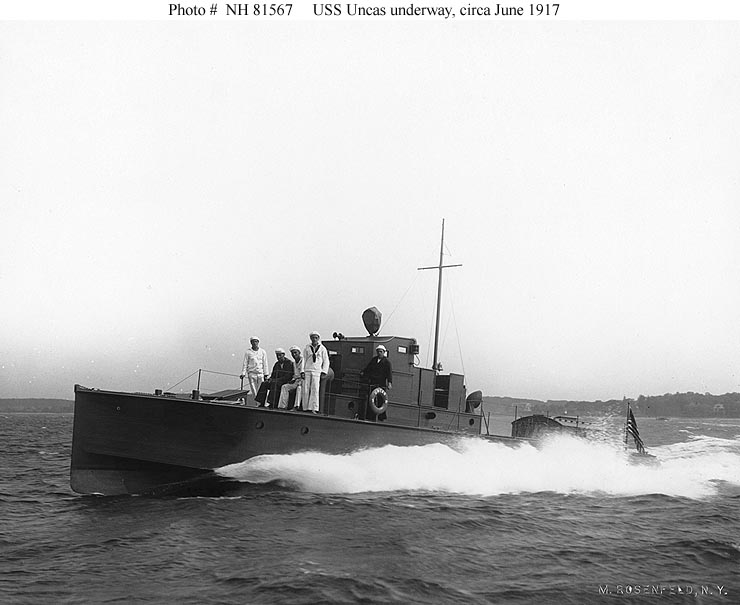
- USS Uncas ca. June 1917, just after completion.

History

United States
- Name: USS Uncas
- Namesake: Uncas (ca. 1588-ca. 1683), a Mohegan chief (previous name retained)
- Builder: Greenport Basin and Construction Company, Greenport, New York
- Completed: 1917
- Acquired: 28 June 1917
- Commissioned: 28 June 1917
- Renamed: USS SP-689 April 1918
- Fate: Returned to owner 31 December 1918
- Notes: Operated as private motorboat Uncas 1917 and from 1919

General characteristics
- Type: Patrol vessel
- Tonnage: 13 tons
- Length: 60 ft (18 m)
- Beam: 10 ft (3.0 m)
- Draft: 2 ft (0.61 m) (mean)
- Speed: 20 knots
- Complement: 8
- Armament: 1 × .30-caliber (7.62-millimeter) machine gun

The third USS Uncas (SP-689), later USS SP-689, was an armed motorboat that served in the United States Navy as a patrol vessel from 1917 to 1918.

Uncas was built as a wooden-hulled civilian motorboat in 1917 by the Greenport Basin and Construction Company at Greenport on Long Island, New York. The U.S. Navy acquired her from her owner, Charles L. Poor of New York City, on 28 June 1917 for use as a patrol boat during World War I. She was commissioned the same day as USS Uncas (SP-689).

Assigned to the 3rd Naval District, Uncas conducted local patrol operations in the New York City area out of Section Base No. 6 at Bath Beach, Brooklyn, New York, for the duration of the war. In April 1918, her name was changed to USS SP-689 to avoid confusion with the tug USS Uncas, which was in commission at the same time.

SP-689 was returned to her owner on 31 December 1918.
