= USS Acme (AMc-61) =

Accentor-class minesweeper

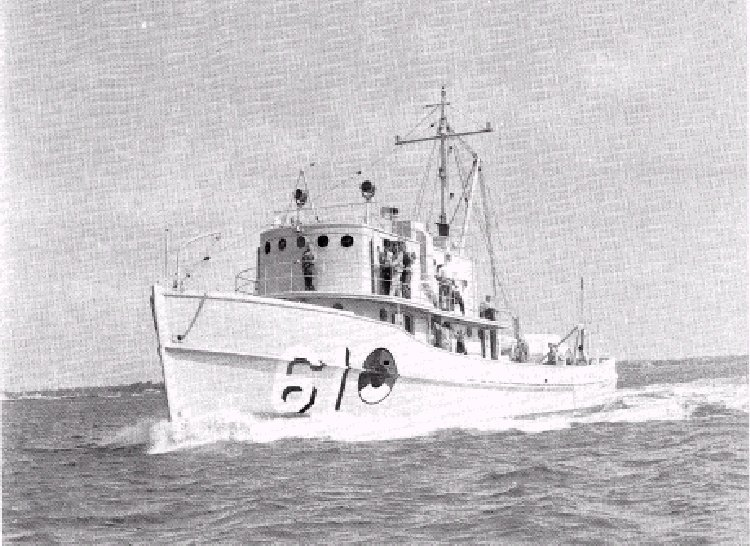

History

United States
- Name: USS Acme
- Ordered: 17 May 1941
- Builder: Greenport Basin and Construction Company
- Laid down: 31 March 1941, as USS Adamant
- Launched: 31 May 1941
- Commissioned: 11 September 1941
- Decommissioned: 13 December 1945
- Renamed: USS Acme on 23 May 1941
- Stricken: 3 January 1946
- Fate: Sold, 3 March 1947

General characteristics
- Class & type: Accentor-class minesweeper
- Displacement: 221 long tons (225 t)
- Length: 97 ft 6 in (29.72 m)
- Beam: 22 ft 6 in (6.86 m)
- Draft: 9 ft (2.7 m)
- Speed: 10 knots (19 km/h; 12 mph)
- Complement: 17
- Armament: 2 × .50 cal (12.7 mm) machine guns

USS Acme (AMc-61) was an Accentor-class coastal minesweeper in the United States Navy. Acme was laid down while still unnamed on 31 March 1941 by the Greenport Basin and Construction Company in Greenport, New York. AMc-61 was named USS Adamant on 17 May 1941; renamed USS Acme on 23 May 1941; launched on 31 May 1941; sponsored by Mrs. John Q. Adams, the wife of the president of the contractor; and commissioned on 11 September 1941.

== World War II East Coast operations ==
Following shakedown, Acme was assigned to the Atlantic Fleet. The ship proceeded to Yorktown, Virginia, where she engaged in minesweeping operations through mid-November. On 23 November, Acme arrived at New London, Connecticut, and began minesweeping and patrol duties in that area. Acme underwent a period of restricted availability at the Boston Navy Yard from 2 to 23 February 1942. The minesweeper departed Boston to return to New London on 3 March.

== Decommissioning ==
On 8 March, Acme was decommissioned and placed in service at New London and operated in coastal waters of New England and New York through the end of the war in Europe. In June 1945, the ship proceeded to Charleston, South Carolina, where she arrived on the 28th. She was placed out of service there on 13 December 1945 and laid up in the Wando River. Six days later, she was declared not essential to the defense of the United States and slated for disposal. The ship was struck from the Navy list on 3 January 1946 and transferred to the Maritime Commission on 3 March 1947. She was simultaneously delivered at Charleston to her purchaser, Mr. Lloyd W. Lambert of Baltimore, Maryland.
