= USS Chingachgook =

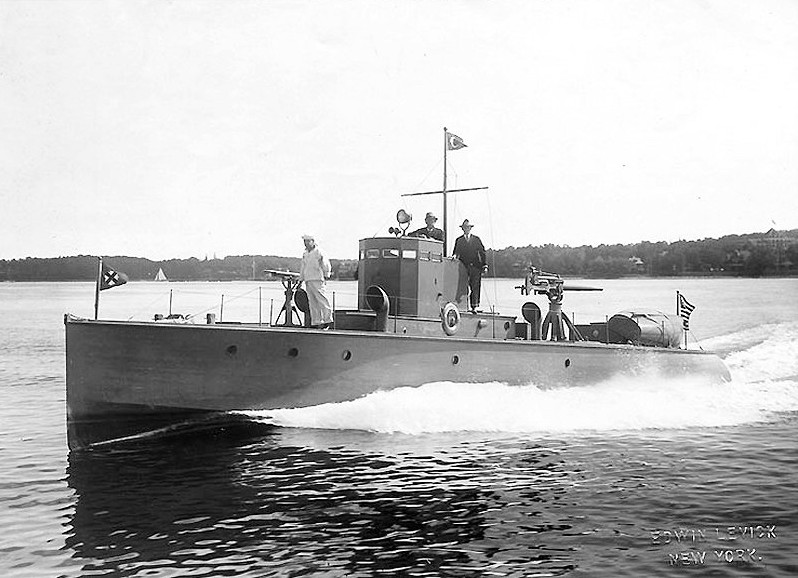
- Chingachgook (American Motor Boat, 1916) underway at high speed, October 1916

History

United States
- Name: USS Chingachgook
- Owner: T. W. Brigham of Greenport, Long Island, New York
- Builder: Greenport Basin and Construction Company of Greenport
- Laid down: date unknown
- Completed: 1916
- Acquired: by the Navy, 25 May 1917
- Commissioned: as USS Chingachgook (SP-35), 6 June 1917
- Decommissioned: 10 January 1918
- Stricken: c. 1918
- Home port: New York City
- Fate: Damaged beyond repair, 31 July 1917; disposed of by burning, 19 February 1918

General characteristics
- Type: Motorboat
- Displacement: Unknown
- Length: 60 ft (18 m)
- Beam: 10 ft (3.0 m)
- Draft: 3 ft (0.91 m)
- Propulsion: 2 × Sterling gasoline engines (2 × 300 shp), two shafts
- Speed: 22 mph (35 km/h)
- Complement: Unknown
- Armament: 1 × QF 1-pounder gun; 1 × Colt–Browning machine gun

USS Chingachgook (SP-35) was a motorboat acquired by the United States Navy during World War I. She was outfitted as an armed patrol craft for the 3rd Naval District and assigned to patrol New York City waterways. After several months of operation by the Navy, an on-board gasoline explosion destroyed the craft.

== A fast motorboat for the era ==
Chingachgook – a 60-foot (18 m) fast motorboat (22 mph or 35 km/h) – was built in 1916 by the Greenport Basin and Construction Company of Greenport, Long Island, New York.

== World War I service ==
Her owner – T. W. Brigham of Greenport – had her armed as a patrol craft as part of the preparedness movement then active in the United States.

She was acquired by the Navy for World War I service in May 1917, and on 6 June 1917 she was placed in commission as USS Chingachgook (SP-35), named after James Fenimore Cooper's Last of the Mohicans character, and assigned to the 3rd Naval District for patrol duty.

The boat briefly performed patrol service in the New York City area, but on 31 July 1917 her gasoline tank exploded, injuring members of the crew and igniting the ship. A survey of 13 October found her hull worthless and beyond repair.

== Decommissioning and disposal ==
Decommissioned at the beginning of October, her remains were disposed of by burning on 19 February 1918.
