= USS Perfecto =

Patrol vessel of the United States Navy

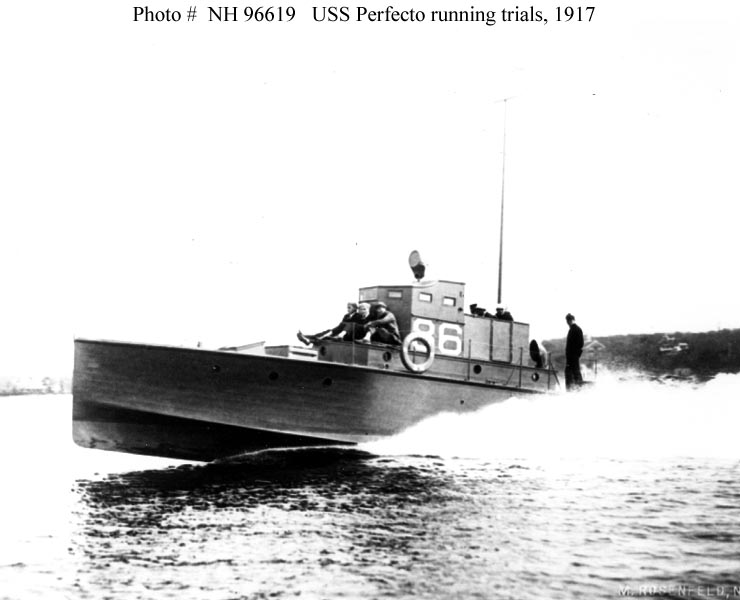

History

United States
- Name: USS Perfecto (SP-86)
- Owner: J. J. Phelps
- Operator: United States Navy
- Builder: Greenport Basin and Construction Company
- Acquired: 22 June 1917
- In service: 25 June 1917
- Fate: Returned to private owner on 18 February 1919.

General characteristics
- Length: 60 ft (18 m)
- Beam: 10 ft (3 m)
- Draft: 3 ft (1 m)
- Speed: 20 knots
- Complement: 9
- Armament: 1 × machine gun

USS Perfecto (SP-86) was a motorboat that served in the United States Navy during World War I. She was built in 1917 by the Greenport Basin and Construction Company in Greenport, New York, and owned by J. J. Phelps of Hackensack, New Jersey. She was acquired by the Navy on 22 June 1917 and placed in service on 25 June 1917. During World War I, Perfecto served in the 5th Naval District, headquartered in Norfolk Navy Yard in Norfolk, Virginia. She patrolled the coastline for German U-boats. She was returned to her owner, Phelps, after the war ended on 18 February 1919.

== Sources ==
- Photo gallery of USS Perfecto at NavSource Naval History
- USS Perfecto (SP-86), 1917-1919
- Perfecto SP-86
