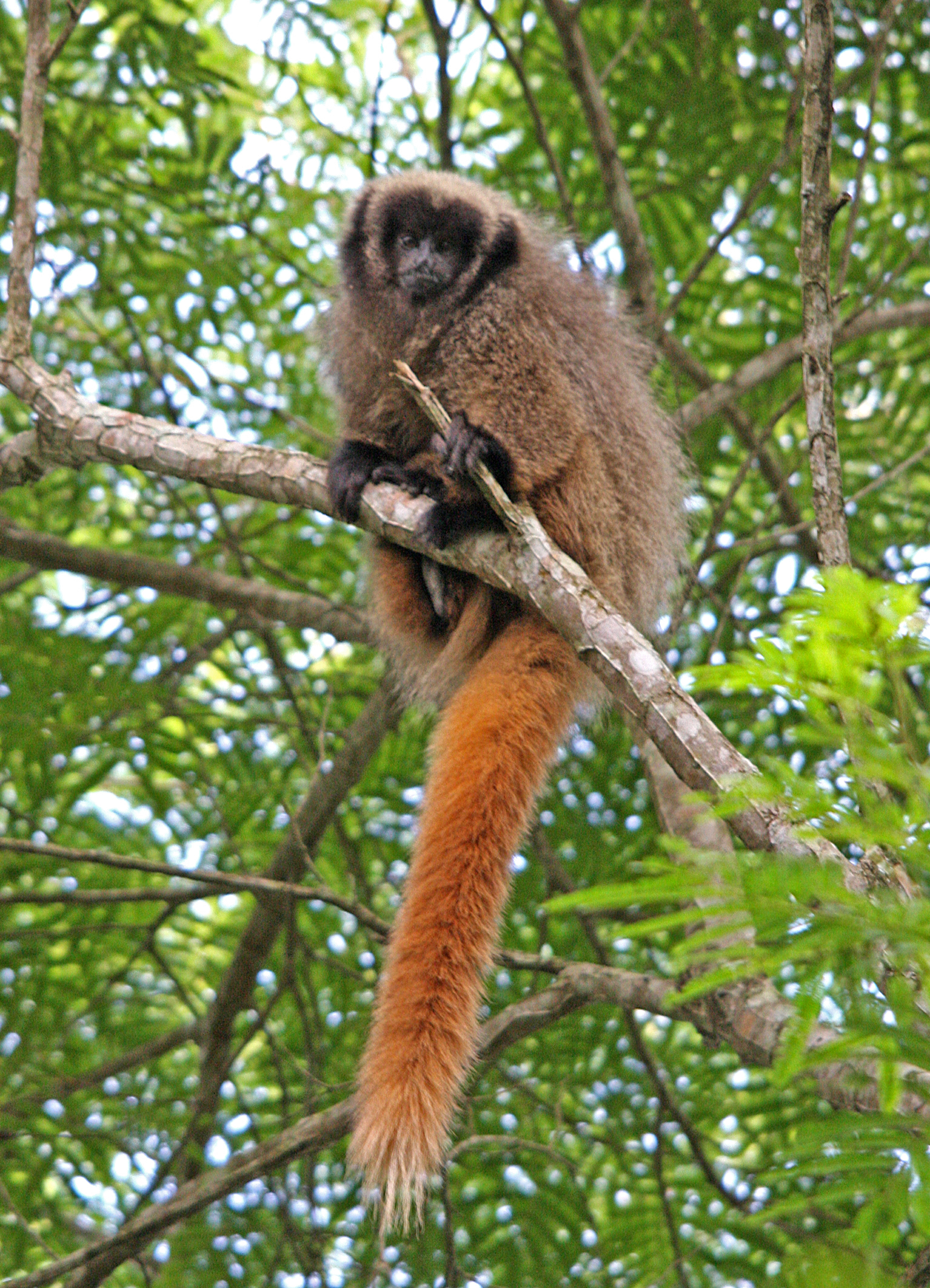
- Black-fronted titi in Prados, Brazil

Conservation status
- Near Threatened (IUCN 3.1)

Scientific classification
- Kingdom: Animalia
- Phylum: Chordata
- Class: Mammalia
- Infraclass: Placentalia
- Order: Primates
- Family: Pitheciidae
- Genus: Callicebus
- Species: C. nigrifrons

Binomial name
- Callicebus nigrifrons (Spix, 1823)
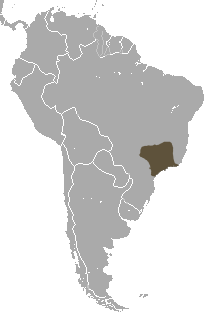
- Black-fronted titi range

= Black-fronted titi monkey =

Black-fronted titi

Species of mammal

The black-fronted titi monkey (Callicebus nigrifrons) is a species of titi, a type of New World monkey.

The black-fronted titi is a small diurnal primate. The body of this primate is covered in grey to brown fur with black fur concentrated around the face, the tail is slightly orange in color. Body weight ranges from 1–2 kilograms (2.2–4.4 lb) and the head-body length is around 270–450 millimeters (11–18 in). This species does not exhibit sexual dimorphism. Members of this species can live up to 12 years of age in captivity.

== Habitat and distribution ==
The black-fronted titi is endemic to the Atlantic forest region of Brazil and has a home range averaging 20 hectares (49 acres). The black-fronted titi is arboreal and prefers the middle to upper canopy of the forest. However, it will move to the forest floor at times to forage, travel, and play. Play behavior on the forest floor has been documented between black-fronted titis and marmosets in Brazil.

== Ecology ==
=== Diet ===
The diet of the black-fronted titi is frugivorous and they forage in dense vegetation. They are also known to eat leaves, seeds, invertebrates, and flowers. Due to their highly frugivorous diet, they play a key role in seed dispersion.

=== Predation ===
Predators of the black-fronted titi include the harpy eagle, owls, hawks, falcons, tayra, jaguarundi, ocelot, margay, oncilla, pumas, jaguars, large snakes, and other, larger primates (such as howler monkeys). Black-fronted titis are particularly vulnerable to harpy eagle attacks when they move to the upper portion of the canopy to sunbathe on cold mornings. After detecting a raptor, black-fronted titis alert the surrounding area quickly through alarm calls before hiding.

== Behaviour ==
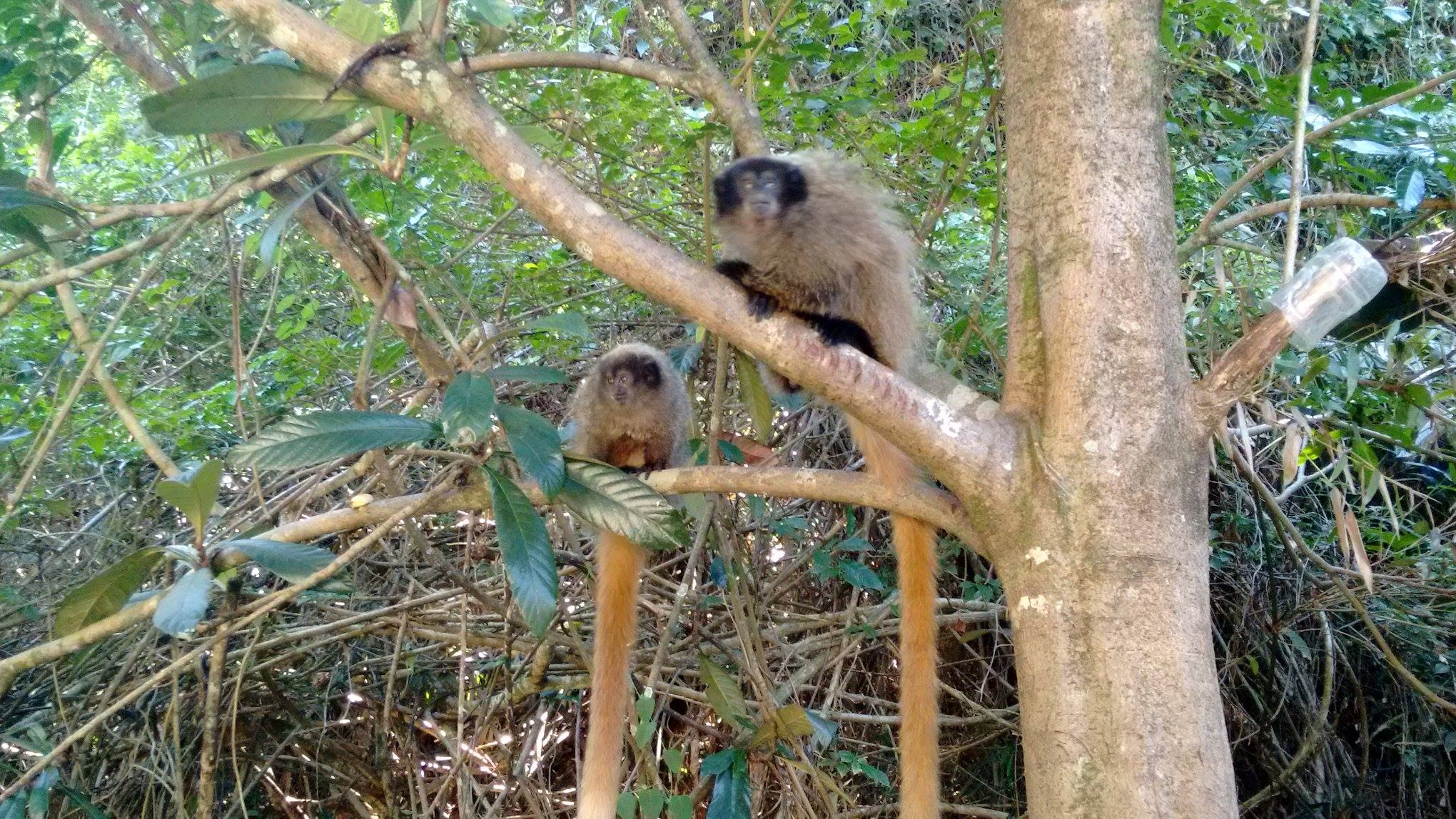
Black-fronted titi pair

The black-fronted titi is socially monogamous and is typically found in a group of two to six individuals, which includes the adult pair and their offspring. Females give birth to one offspring per year, usually in July or August. Parental care and social activities with the offspring are carried out by the male of this species, while the female only provides milk. Both males and females disperse from their natal group at three years of age.

The black-fronted titi is territorial and will defend territories, food resources, and mates with loud calls individually or in duets or choruses. Loud calls are used for within and between group communication and have a high amplitude and a low frequency which allows them to be heard over long distances. Loud calls are broadcast at dawn and when titis see or hear another group. When confronted by a predator, duets and choruses can last up to two hours, with group members alternating between soft and loud calls. There are no sex differences in calling behavior during predator interactions, both males and females will call. The black-fronted titi can produce calls which encode the predator type (aerial or terrestrial) and predator location to nearby conspecifics.

Characteristic of the Callicebinae subfamily, black-fronted titis can be observed with interwoven tails, a behavior thought to reinforce pair bonds and strengthen social relationships.

== Conservation ==
The black-fronted titi is classified as near threatened by the IUCN due to extensive habitat loss, forest fragmentation, and an estimated population decline of more than 20% in the past 24 years. Small, isolated populations are common due to fragmentation and in some areas this has led to the species going locally extinct. Noise pollution can also negatively impact this species. One study found that noise from mining operations restricted the black-fronted titis long-distance communication due to the overlap in frequency between mining noise and loud calls, this is significant for a species that relies heavily on vocal communication in social interactions.
