= USS Advance (AMc-63) =

Minesweeper of the United States Navy

History

United States
- Name: USS Advance
- Ordered: as Aggressor
- Builder: Greenport Basin and Construction Company
- Laid down: 12 April 1941
- Launched: 28 June 1941
- In service: 10 October 1941
- Out of service: 6 December 1945
- Renamed: Renamed Advance, 23 May 1941
- Stricken: 3 January 1946
- Fate: Scrapped, 3 March 1947

General characteristics
- Class & type: Accentor-class coastal minesweeper
- Displacement: 185 long tons (188 t)
- Length: 97 ft 1 in (29.59 m)
- Beam: 22 ft 0 in (6.71 m)
- Draft: 8 ft 6 in (2.59 m) (mean) (f.)
- Speed: 10.0 knots
- Complement: 17
- Armament: two .50 cal (12.7 mm) machine guns

USS Advance (AMc-63) was an Accentor-class coastal minesweeper acquired by the United States Navy for the task of removing mines from minefields laid in the water to prevent ships from passing.

The fifth ship to be named Advance by the Navy, AMc-63 was laid down on 12 April 1941 at Greenport, Long Island, New York, by the Greenport Basin and Construction Company as Aggressor; renamed Advance on 23 May 1941; launched on 28 June 1941; sponsored by Mary R. Gillespie; and placed in service at the New York Navy Yard on 10 October 1941, Lt. Walter E. Goering, USNR, in charge.

== World War II service ==
The coastal minesweeper completed her outfitting at Brooklyn, New York, and moved south to Norfolk, Virginia. After mine detection and sweeping training under the auspices of the Naval Mine Warfare School at Yorktown, Virginia, Advance began operations with the forces assigned to the Commandant, 5th Naval District.

Based at Little Creek, Virginia, she served directly under the Commander, Inshore Patrol, 5th Naval District. That duty lasted until late May 1944 when she was reassigned to the 1st Naval District.

Advance operated along the New England coast until the middle of June 1945. At that time, she returned briefly to Norfolk before continuing on to Charleston, South Carolina, in July. There, the minesweeper reported to the Commandant, 6th Naval District, for disposition.

== Post-war inactivation ==
On 6 December 1945, Advance was placed out of service and berthed in the Wando River. Her name was struck from the Navy list on 3 January 1946, and she was sold for scrapping on 3 March 1947 to Lloyd Lambert of Baltimore, Maryland.
