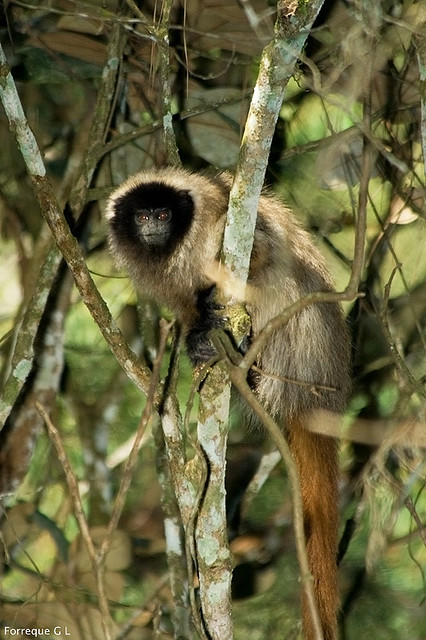
- Atlantic titi (Callicebus personatus)

Scientific classification
- Domain: Eukaryota
- Kingdom: Animalia
- Phylum: Chordata
- Class: Mammalia
- Order: Primates
- Suborder: Haplorhini
- Infraorder: Simiiformes
- Family: Pitheciidae
- Subfamily: Callicebinae
- Genus: Callicebus; Thomas, 1903

Type species
- Simia personatus É. Geoffroy, 1812

Species
- Callicebus barbarabrownae Callicebus coimbrai Callicebus melanochir Callicebus nigrifrons Callicebus personatus

= Callicebus =

Genus of New World monkeys

Callicebus is a genus of monkeys known as titi monkeys.

Historically, titis were monogeneric, comprising only the genus Callicebus Thomas, 1903. Owing to the great diversity found across titi monkey species, a new genus-level taxonomy was recently proposed that recognises three genera within the subfamily Callicebinae; Cheracebus Byrne et al., 2016 for the species of the torquatus group (Widow titis); Plecturocebus Byrne et al., 2016 for the Amazonian and Chaco titis of the moloch and donacophilus groups; and Callicebus Thomas, 1903 sensu stricto, for species of the Atlantic Forest personatus group.

In 2014, a previously unknown orange Callicebus was spotted in the Peruvian Amazon; it has not been determined whether this constitutes a color variant or a new species.

== Species ==
There are 5 species in this genus:

- Barbara Brown's titi monkey, Callicebus barbarabrownae
- Coimbra Filho's titi monkey, Callicebus coimbrai
- Coastal black-handed titi monkey, Callicebus melanochir
- Black-fronted titi monkey, Callicebus nigrifrons
- Atlantic titi monkey, Callicebus personatus

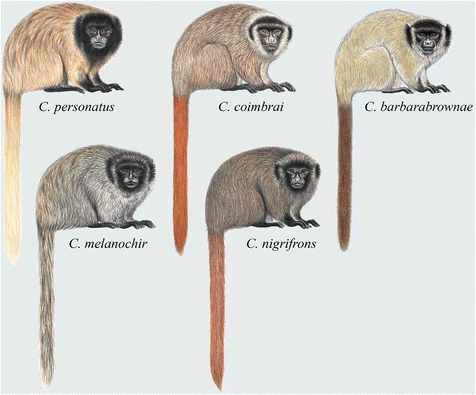
Callicebus species
