= USS Aggressor (AMc-64) =

Minesweeper of the United States Navy

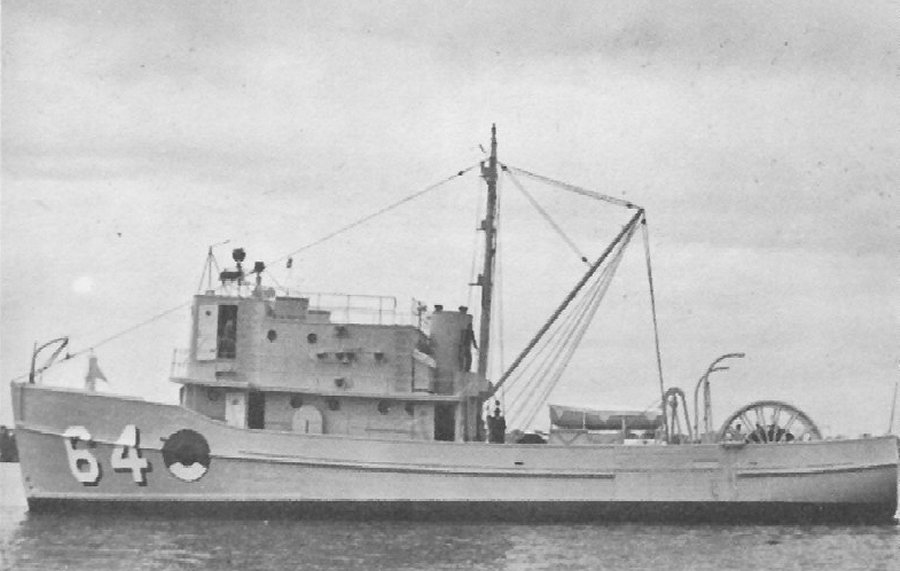
- USS Aggressor (AMc-64) 23 December 1941

History

United States
- Name: USS Aggressor (AMc-64)
- Ordered: as Alliance
- Builder: Greenport Basin and Construction Company
- Laid down: 15 April 1941
- Launched: 19 July 1941
- In service: 24 October 1941
- Out of service: 28 December 1945
- Renamed: USS Aggressor (AMc-64), 23 May 1941
- Stricken: 21 January 1946
- Fate: Sold on 3 March 1947 for scrapping

General characteristics
- Class & type: Accentor-class coastal minesweeper
- Displacement: 195 tons
- Length: 97 ft 1 in (29.59 m)
- Beam: 22 ft 0 in (6.71 m)
- Draft: 8 ft 6 in (2.59 m)(mean) (f.)
- Speed: 10.0 knots
- Complement: 17
- Armament: two .50 cal (12.7 mm) machine guns

USS Aggressor (AMc-64) was an Accentor-class coastal minesweeper acquired by the U.S. Navy for the dangerous task of removing mines from minefields laid in the water to prevent ships from passing.

Aggressor was laid down at Greenport, Long Island, New York, on 15 April 1941 by the Greenport Basin and Construction Company as Alliance (AMc-64); renamed Aggressor on 23 May 1941; launched on 19 July 1941; sponsored by Mrs. Arthur M. Van De Water; and placed in service at the New York Navy Yard on 24 October 1941.

== World War II service ==
The coastal minesweeper completed fitting out at Brooklyn, New York, and, at the end of the first week in November, moved south to Norfolk, Virginia. For the next 31 months, Aggressor served with the minesweeping and patrol forces attached to the 5th Naval District.

Near the middle of May 1944, she was reassigned to the 1st Naval District and operated from the naval frontier base located at Portland, Maine. In June 1945, Aggressor returned south to Norfolk but remained there only until late July at which time she moved farther south to Charleston, South Carolina. Aggressor remained at that port until placed out of service on 28 December 1945.

== Post-war deactivation ==
Aggressor’s name was struck from the Navy list on 21 January 1946, and she was sold on 3 March 1947 to Mr. Lloyd Lambert, of Baltimore, Maryland, for scrapping.
