= USS Vitesse =

Patrol vessel of the United States Navy

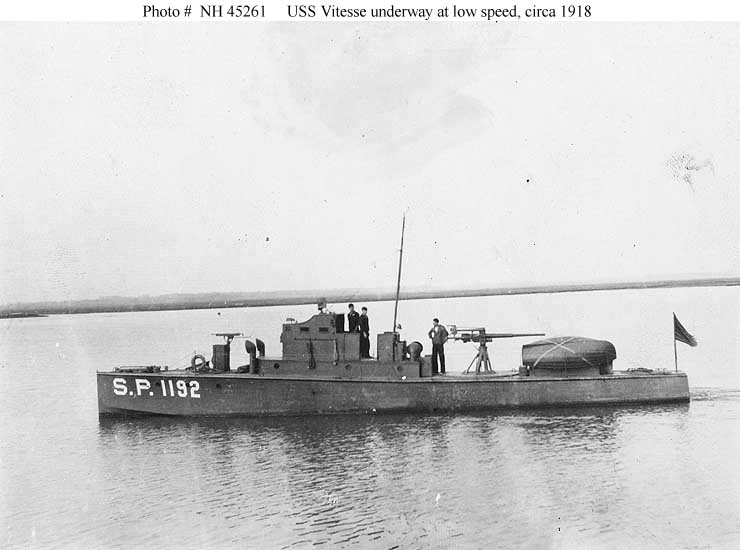
- USS Vitesse (SP-1192) underway at low speed, ca. 1918.

History

United States
- Name: USS Vitesse
- Namesake: Previous name retained
- Builder: Greenport Basin and Construction Company, Greenport, New York
- Completed: 1917
- Acquired: July 1917
- Commissioned: 18 July 1917
- Decommissioned: 3 December 1918
- Stricken: 4 December 1918
- Fate: Returned to owner 4 December 1918
- Notes: Operated as private motorboat Vitesse 1917 and from 1918

General characteristics
- Type: Patrol vessel
- Tonnage: 18 Gross register tons
- Length: 60 ft 0 in (18.29 m)
- Beam: 10 ft 0 in (3.05 m)
- Draft: 3 ft 0 in (0.91 m) mean
- Speed: 22.0 knots
- Complement: 7
- Armament: 1 × 3-pounder gun; 1 × Colt machine gun

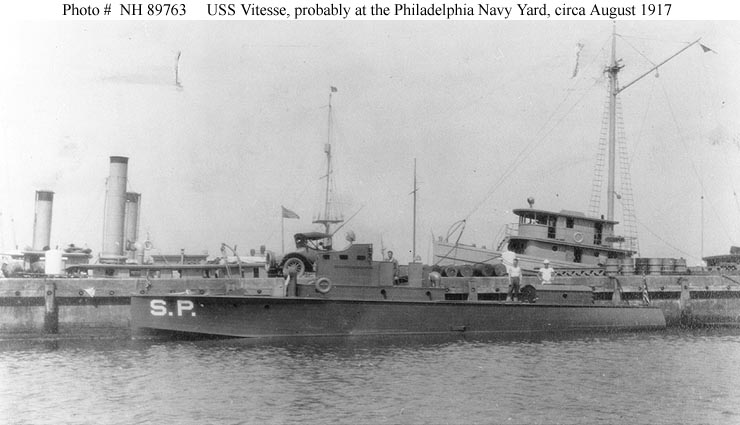
Vitesse ca. August 1917, probably at the Philadelphia Navy Yard at Philadelphia, Pennsylvania, while being fitted out for U.S. Navy service. Painting of her section patrol (SP) number on her bow is incomplete, and she has not yet been armed.

USS Vitesse (SP-1192) was a United States Navy patrol vessel in commission from 1917 to 1918.

== Construction, acquisition, and commissioning ==
Vitesse was built in 1917 as a private wooden-hulled motorboat of the same name by the Greenport Basin and Construction Company at Greenport on Long Island, New York. She was one of several similar craft constructed at that time by the same builder, probably a result of the national Preparedness Movement that arose in the United States in the months prior to the U.S. entry into World War I.

In July 1917, the U.S. Navy acquired Vitesse under a free lease from her owner, Charles Fry, for use as a section patrol boat during World War I. She was commissioned at the Philadelphia Navy Yard in Philadelphia, Pennsylvania, on 18 July 1917 as USS Vitesse (SP-1192) with her owner, Machinist's Mate Second Class Charles Fry, USNRF, in temporary command. On 29 July 1917, Lieutenant, junior grade, E. C. Sweeney, USNRF, assumed command.

== Operational history ==
Over the next few weeks, Vitesse remained in the Philadelphia area, fitting out for naval service. Her main battery, a single pedestal-mounted 3-pounder gun, was installed at the Essington Ship Building Company at Essington, Pennsylvania, on 3 August 1917. On 7 August 1917, she received her secondary battery, a single Colt machine gun, and she took on ammunition at Fort Mifflin on 8 August 1917.

Assigned to operate from the section base at Cape May, New Jersey, as part of the 4th Naval District's harbor entrance patrol, Vitesse departed Philadelphia on the afternoon of 9 August 1917, carrying 1,000 hymn books for the chaplain at Cape May and confidential publications for the commander of the harbor entrance patrol there. She performed her initial patrol duty out of Sewall's Point and Cape May, patrolling assigned sectors, usually off submarine net defenses, speaking to and identifying passing naval and merchant vessels. In addition, she occasionally carried dispatches to other boats on patrol and stood by, ready to assist other nearby small craft in need of aid.

Vitesse escorted the patrol vessel USS Aloha (SP-317), the flagship of Rear Admiral Cameron McRae Winslow (1854–1932), Inspector of Naval Districts, Atlantic Coast, when he inspected the wreck of the steamer SS Herbert Pratt off Lewes, Delaware, on 4 and 5 June 1918. On 30 September 1918, while operating temporarily out of the Corinthian Yacht Club near Philadelphia, she embarked Rear Admiral James M. Helm (1855–1927), Commandant of the 4th Naval District, and Rear Admiral Hugo Osterhaus (1851–1927), USN (Ret.), from the Office of Naval Districts, as they toured Philadelphia harbor on an inspection trip.

Vitesse later was rebased at Lewes, from which she patrolled through the end of World War I.

== Decommissioning and disposal ==
At 0605 hours on 24 November 1918, Vitesse departed Lewes. She arrived at Fort Mifflin at 1600 hours the same day to offload ammunition. When that task was done, she proceeded to Pier 19 at Philadelphia, arriving there at 1715 the same day. She remained there until she was decommissioned on 3 December 1918. She was stricken from the Navy List on 4 December 1918 and was simultaneously returned to Fry.
