= Greenport Village Historic District =

Historic district in New York, United States

- U.S. National Register of Historic Places
- U.S. Historic district
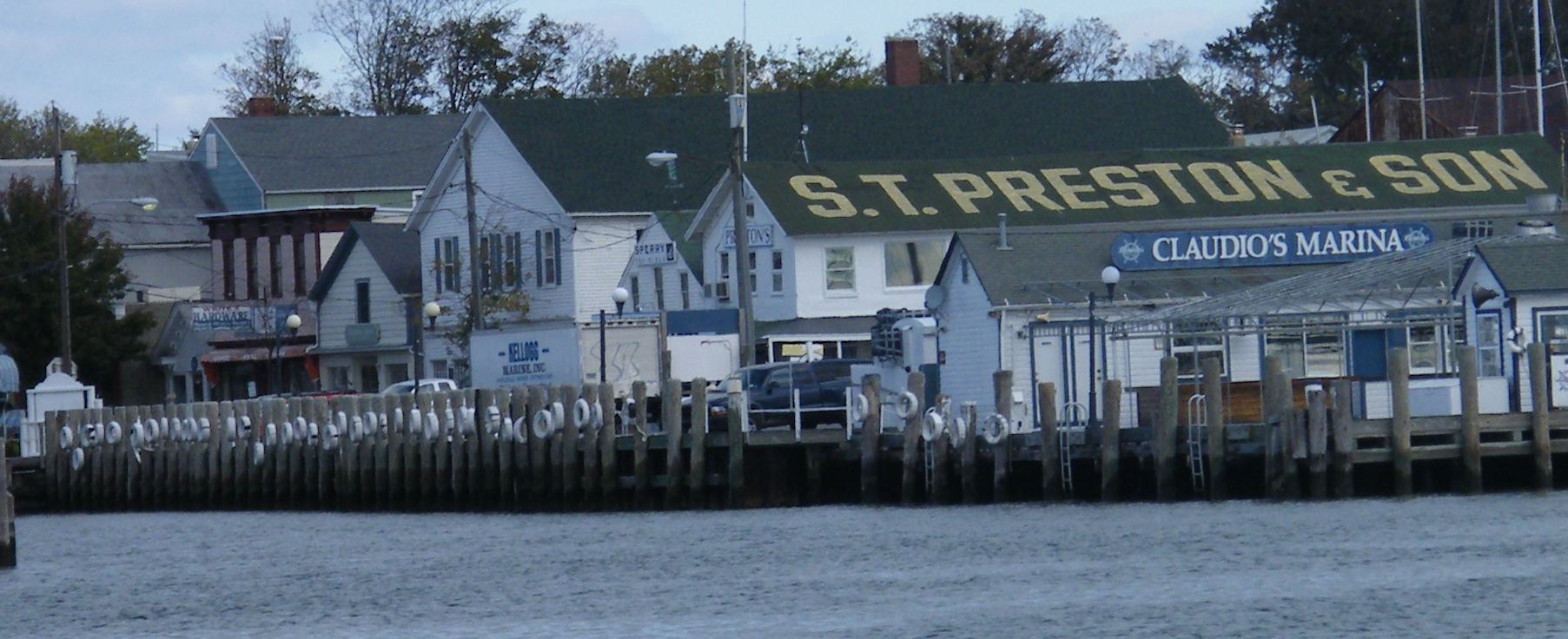
- Greenport Village Historic District, October 2008

- Location within New York Location within the United States
- Location: Roughly bounded by Stirling Basin, Main, Monsell, 2nd, and Front Sts., Greenport, New York
- Coordinates: 41°6′17″N 72°21′53″W
- Area: 80 acres (32 ha)
- Built: 1750
- Architect: Multiple
- Architectural style: Greek Revival, Late Victorian, Federal
- NRHP reference No.: 84002973
- Added to NRHP: September 13, 1984

Greenport Village Historic District is a national historic district located at Greenport in Suffolk County, New York. The district has 254 contributing buildings. It contains a large, dense collection of largely unchanged structures from about 1750 to the 1930s. It includes a simple 18th and 19th century settlement period house, a large representative mixture of mid- to late-19th century residential design, a small Main Street commercial district, and architecturally distinctive churches and institutional buildings.

It was added to the National Register of Historic Places in 1986.
