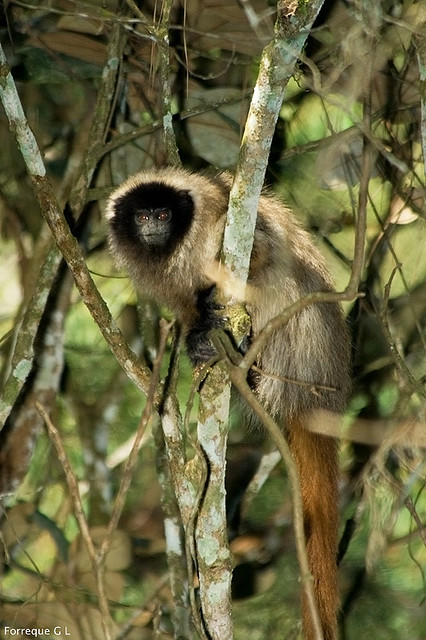
- Atlantic titi in Domingos Martins, Brazil

Conservation status
- Vulnerable (IUCN 3.1)

Scientific classification
- Kingdom: Animalia
- Phylum: Chordata
- Class: Mammalia
- Infraclass: Placentalia
- Order: Primates
- Family: Pitheciidae
- Genus: Callicebus
- Species: C. personatus

Binomial name
- Callicebus personatus (É. Geoffroy in Humboldt, 1812)
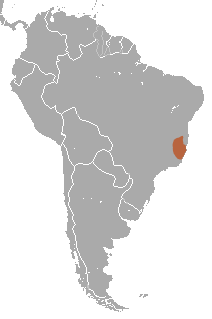
- Atlantic titi range

= Atlantic titi monkey =

Atlantic titi

Species of New World monkey

The Atlantic titi monkey or masked titi (Callicebus personatus) is a species of titi, a type of New World monkey, endemic to Brazil.

== Distribution and general features ==
The Atlantic titi is part of the genus Callicebus which is composed of thirteen species and sixteen subspecies. Some more recent classifications of titis recognise many more species, and split the genus into three separate genera. The C. personatus group is retained in Callicebus.

Three subspecies of Callicebus personatus have been described in scientific literature: C.p. melanochir, C.p. nigrifrons, and C.p. personatus, each of which has been treated as a full species by some authors. Atlantic titis are territorial, middle-sized, cebid monkeys; usually 1–2 kg in size. C. personatus are found primarily in the humid forests east of the Andes Mountains, specifically in the coastal, inland forests of south-eastern Brazil. The states they have been documented to dwell within include Bahia, Espírito Santo, Minas Gerais, Rio de Janeiro, and São Paulo. Of all the Callicebus species, Atlantic titi monkeys have the largest geographic range except for C. torquatus, covering approximately 1,000 kilometers. They customarily share their living area with other monkeys such as the lion tamarin and spider monkey.

=== Subspecies variations ===
The three subspecies of Callicebus personatus are products of clinical differentiation (when certain portions of the population are cut off from the parental stock due to an ecological barrier such as a river and are thus completely genetically isolated from one another). Distinctions between each of the Callicebus subspecies are based on coat color. The evolution of these coat colors is termed metachromism. The pigments are produced by melanocytes which deposit the pigments into the medulla of growing hair so that the hair grows with the color of that distinct pigment. The characteristic pigment of the Callicebus is eumelanin (dark brown or black) found in the iris, skin, and hair (usually on the forehead, crown and tail).

== Diet ==
Atlantic titis are opportunistic feeders. In other words, they eat based on the abundance of food that is available to them in each season. Their food choices are not usually very selective, but they are frugivorous, usually eating fleshy fruits, seeds, and leaves.

=== Geophagy ===
It has been documented that they can be geophagic meaning that at times they eat soil. Various hypotheses exist for their geophagic nature. These include the following:

- Dietary mineral supplementation
- Adjustment of pH balance in the stomach
- Absorption of plant toxins
- Tactile sensation in the mouth
- Physiochemical effects on the gastrointestinal tract
- Relief from infestation of internal parasites

Masked titis are tree monkeys. It is not customary to find them on the forest floor. It is speculated that they prefer to remain in the rainforest trees to avoid snake predation. They remain at least 5 meters above the ground for 99% of their daily activities. Due to their frugivorous nature, they have rarely been observed on the ground foraging for insects or small vertebrates. Instead they prefer to remain high in the tree limbs of the dense eastern Brazilian rainforest. Because they prefer not to be on the ground, researchers have observed them eating soil found atop ant mounds. This is an added advantage to the masked titis for the following reasons:

- It is a safer location to choose soil because it allows the monkeys to scan for surrounding predators and gives them close access to the protection of the trees
- Aggregate soil is easier for them to grasp with their opposable fingers than forest floor topsoil (which is not as held together as soil that has been cemented together by leaf-cutting ants)
- There is less leaf litter and forest debris on ant mounds, thus decreasing the amount of time they are exposed to predators

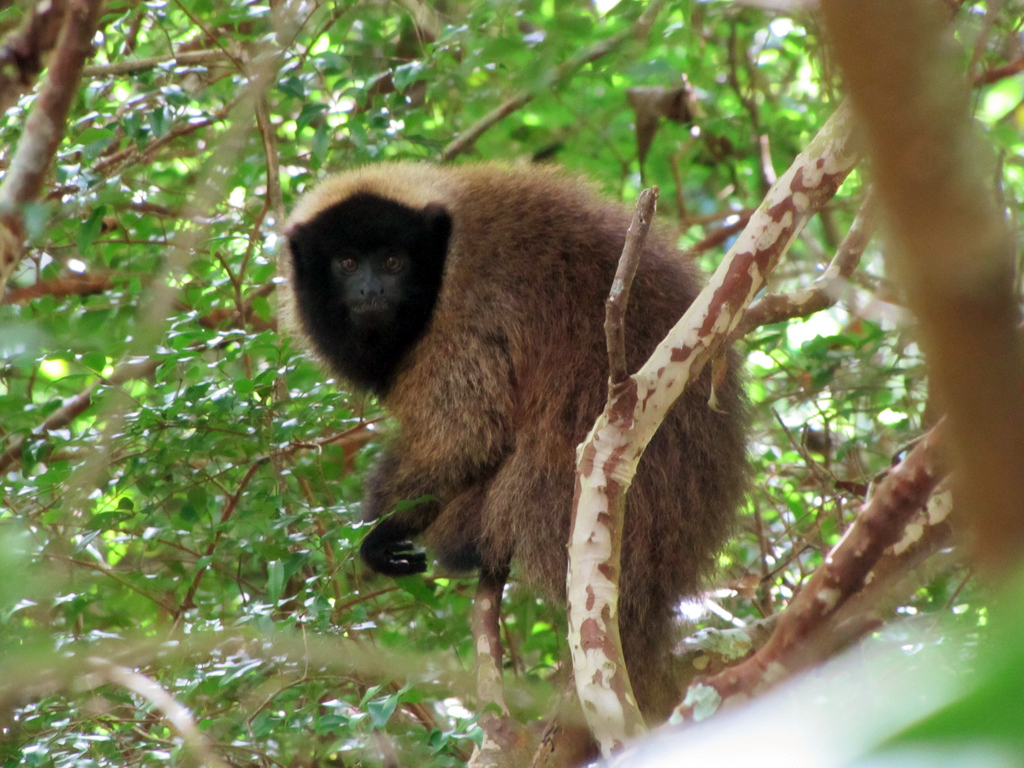
Atlantic titi is a species of Espírito Santo Atlantic Forest.

For many years, researchers believed that geophagy might be used by the masked titi's as a sodium supplement as their high foliage diets were quite low in sodium. However, results of geochemical analysis of the soils eaten by C. personatus demonstrated that these soils did not contain high quantities of sodium. Although the soil consumed by masked titis was found to contain many different minerals in comparison to random soil samples, these minerals where not necessarily a valuable component of the titi diet. Therefore, it was concluded that soil was not a nutritionally significant portion of their diet. Another hypothesis suggested that the soil served as an antacid. However, results of the most recent studies demonstrated that the soil consumed by the monkeys contained a very low pH compared to random soil samples. Therefore, it seems geophagy is not principally used to buffer the stomach pH levels. In addition, because the clay molecule has a large flat structure that is ideal for toxin absorption, researchers also suggested that soil could serve to absorb the toxins acquired by the consumption of such a high quantity and variety of forest foliage. Unfortunately, more research needs to be conducted on this hypothesis to test its validity as currently no studies have been conducted on the toxicity levels in the fruit eaten by the masked titis. It is also important to note that termite mound soil was preferred by the titis in addition to the ant soil. Both the ant mound soil as well as the termite mound soil perform the same function for the monkeys, however some researchers have observed that the monkeys usually tend to prefer termite mound soil to ant mound soil when given both options. The reason for such a preference is not yet known.

== Survival ==
Regardless of the presence of humans in Brazilian forests, titi monkeys customarily venture to dwell in "disturbed" forests (forests that have been cut down or invaded by humans) as long as the food availability is higher than in undisturbed forests. The use of disturbed and undisturbed forest by masked titi monkeys Callicebus personatus melanochir is proportional to food availability. The Atlantic Forest of eastern Brazil has been cut down to 5% of its original state with only 2% of that being undisturbed forest. Their existence is completely dependent on their ability to successfully reside in disturbed forests. However, titis do not seem to be aware of the difference between a disturbed and undisturbed forest. As previously mentioned, they feed opportunistically and therefore will reside in whatever forest has the most food available. As long as food is available to them (even if humans provide this food), it is feasible that the monkeys survive the deforestation of much of the Southern American rain forests.

== Reproduction ==
Atlantic titis are usually monogamous (they stay with one mate throughout their entire lifespan). They have one offspring per year. It is difficult to distinguish between the sexes externally, however Atlantic titi family dynamics indicate that the father carries the infant at all times during the nursing.

== Level of daily activity ==
Two major types of activity have been observed in masked titis. The first is characterized by two feeding periods separated by a relatively long resting period. The two feeding periods are in different locations in which a significant portion of the day was spent traveling to the second location to feed. The second activity pattern contained three feeding periods also separated by resting periods. However, travel was much more evenly dispersed throughout the day in this pattern. Each feeding period lasted approximately 2–3 hours, and traveling usually consumed approximately 20% of their day.

Masked titis do have territorial displays throughout the day. The defend their territories by loud intergroup vocalizations to other groups of monkeys and to other animals in the general area. Additionally, all titi monkeys have "Dawn Calls" in the mornings in which the male and female usually duet the same song.

== Predation ==
Atlantic titi monkeys are eaten by Felidae, Falconiformes, pit vipers (Bothrops) and tree boas (Corallus).
