= HMS Aggressor =

One ship of the Royal Navy has borne the name HMS Aggressor, while another was planned:

- HMS Aggressor (1801) was a 14-gun gun-brig launched in 1801 and sold in 1815.
- HMS Aggressor (P446) was to have been an Amphion-class submarine. She was ordered 1945 but cancelled later that year.
