= USS Eugene F. Price =

United States Navy patrol vessel and minesweeper

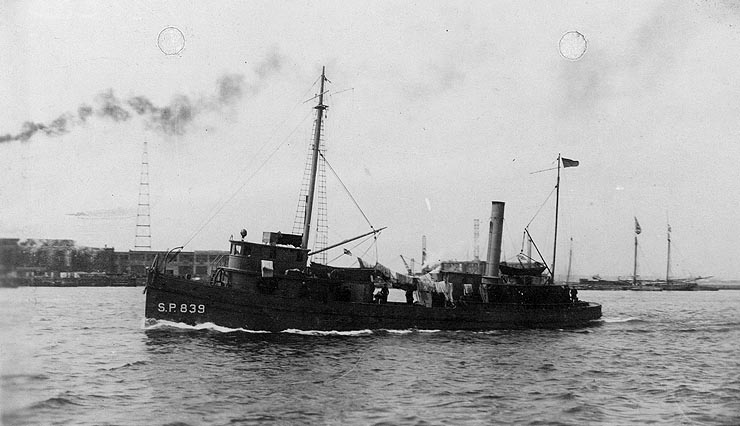
- USS Eugene F. Price (SP-839) ca. 1918.

History

United States
- Name: USS Eugene F. Price
- Namesake: Previous name retained
- Completed: 1874
- Acquired: 1917
- Commissioned: 29 June 1917
- Stricken: 17 May 1919
- Fate: Sold January 1920
- Notes: Operated as commercial fishing trawler Eugene F. Price 1874-1917

General characteristics
- Type: Patrol vessel and minesweeper
- Tonnage: 168 gross register tons
- Length: 125 ft 5 in (38.23 m) between perpendiculars
- Beam: 18 ft 9 in (5.72 m)
- Draft: 8 ft 8 in (2.64 m)
- Speed: 12 knots
- Complement: 23
- Armament: 2 × 1-pounder guns

USS Eugene F. Price (SP-839) was a United States Navy patrol vessel and minesweeper in commission from 1917 to 1919.

Eugene F. Price was built as a commercial fishing trawler of the same name in 1874. In 1917, the U.S. Navy purchased her for use during World War I. Assigned the section patrol number 839, she was commissioned on 29 June 1917 as USS Eugene F. Price (SP-839).

Enrolled in the Naval Coast Defense Reserve, Eugene F. Price was assigned to the 2nd Naval District in southern New England. She carried out patrol and minesweeping duties there for the rest of World War I.

Decommissioned after the end of the war, Eugene F. Price was stricken from the Navy List on 17 May 1919 and sold in January 1920.
