= Aggression (disambiguation) =

Aggression is overt or covert social interaction with the intention of inflicting damage or other harm upon another individual or group.

Aggression may also refer to:

- Aggression (poker), plays such as opens, raises and a check-raise
- The Aggression, a 1988 German film
- Agression (band), an American rock band
- Crime of aggression, the illegal use of state military force
- Non-aggression principle, the initiation of force (or force substitute) against another moral agent
- War of aggression, a military conflict waged without international legality
- WWF Aggression, a 2000 hip hop album
