= Greenport, Suffolk County, New York =

Greenport, New York
- Village
- Incorporated Village of Greenport
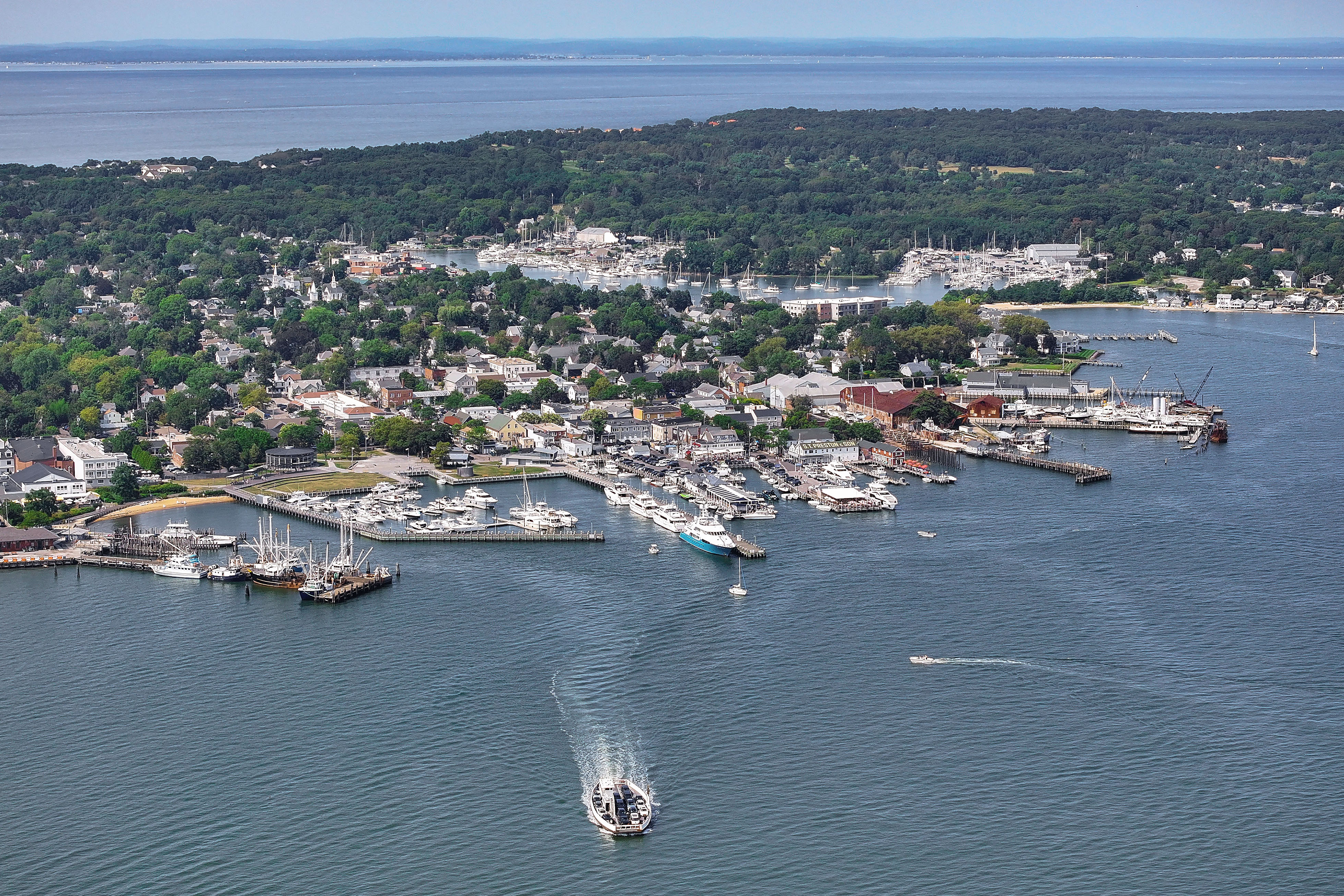
- Greenport’s harborfront

- Seal

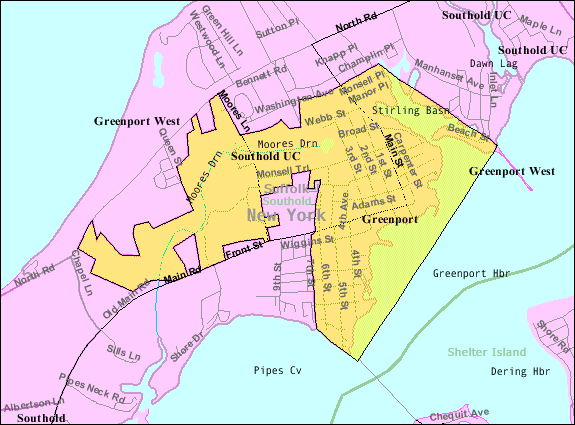
- U.S. Census Map

- Location within Long Island Location within New York Location within the United States
- Coordinates: 41°6′11″N 72°21′50″W
- Country: United States
- State: New York
- County: Suffolk
- Town: Southold
- First settled: 1682
- Incorporated: 1838

Government
  - Mayor: Kevin Stuessi

Area
  - Total: 1.20 sq mi (3.11 km^{2})
  - Land: 0.95 sq mi (2.46 km^{2})
  - Water: 0.25 sq mi (0.65 km^{2})
- Elevation: 9.8 ft (3 m)

Population (2020)
  - Total: 2,583
  - Density: 2,719.3/sq mi (1,049.94/km^{2})
- Time zone: UTC-5 (Eastern (EST))
  - Summer (DST): UTC-4 (EDT)
- ZIP code: 11944
- Area codes: 631, 934
- FIPS code: 36-30576
- GNIS feature ID: 0951759
- Website: villageofgreenport.org

Greenport is a village in New York's Suffolk County, on the North Fork of Long Island. It is located within the Town of Southold and is the only incorporated community in the town. The population was 2,197 at the 2010 census.

Greenport was a major port for its area, having developed a strong fishing and whaling industry in the past, although currently there are only a handful of commercial fishing vessels operating out of the village. More recently the tourism industry has grown substantially.

== History ==
Greenport was first settled in 1682 and incorporated in 1838. Greenport was once a whaling and ship building village, and since 1844, has been the eastern terminal station on the north fork for the Long Island Rail Road.

During Prohibition, rum running and speakeasies became a significant part of Greenport's economy. Greenport's residents knew the waters well and could outrun the coastguard. Restaurants on the east end, including Claudio's in Greenport, served the illegal booze. Many of the village's older structures are included in the Greenport Village Historic District, which was added to the National Register of Historic Places in 1986.

=== Police department disbanded ===
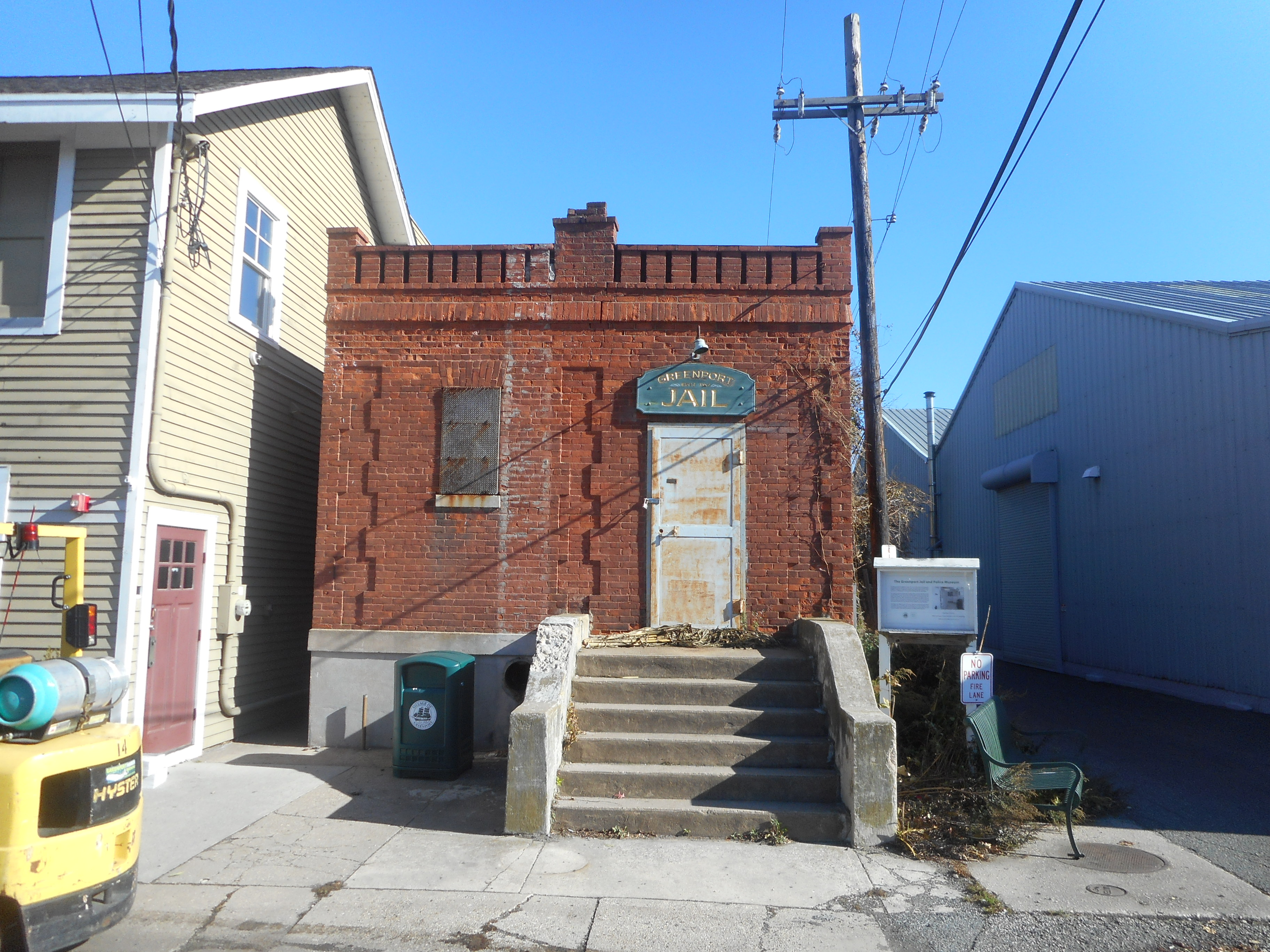
The former Greenport Jail and Police department, now a museum.

Village residents voted 617–339 in November 1994 to disband their nine-member police department. The department, which was established in 1947, was shut down after a grand jury investigation into a series of scandals. Since the shutdown, police services have been provided by the Southold Town Police Department. In 2005, trustees established a local chapter parapolice organization of volunteer Guardian Angels, to patrol the village.

Code Enforcement & Fire Prevention

In June 2016, the Village of Greenport began enforcing its own vehicle and traffic code, marking the first time since 1994 the Village enforced its traffic laws. The Village of Greenport Code Enforcement & Fire Prevention Department continue to enforce the Village Code, as well as a number of other Federal, State and Local rules & regulations.

== Geography ==
According to the United States Census Bureau, the village has a total area of 1.2 square miles (3.1 km^{2}), of which 1.0 square mile (2.6 km^{2}) is land and 0.2 square miles (0.52 km^{2}) (20.66%) is water.

== Climate ==
Climate data for Greenport, Suffolk County, New York (1981–2010 normals, extremes 1958–present)
Month	Jan	Feb	Mar	Apr	May	Jun	Jul	Aug	Sep	Oct	Nov	Dec	Year
Record high °F (°C)	63 (17)	67 (19)	76 (24)	87 (31)	95 (35)	92 (33)	97 (36)	98 (37)	94 (34)	82 (28)	76 (24)	72 (22)	98 (37)
Mean daily maximum °F (°C)	37.3 (2.9)	39.3 (4.1)	46.0 (7.8)	55.3 (12.9)	65.2 (18.4)	74.4 (23.6)	79.9 (26.6)	79.3 (26.3)	72.9 (22.7)	62.7 (17.1)	53.1 (11.7)	43.1 (6.2)	59.0 (15.0)
Daily mean °F (°C)	30.6 (−0.8)	32.1 (0.1)	38.6 (3.7)	47.8 (8.8)	57.3 (14.1)	67.1 (19.5)	72.9 (22.7)	72.3 (22.4)	66.0 (18.9)	55.6 (13.1)	45.9 (7.7)	36.4 (2.4)	51.9 (11.1)
Mean daily minimum °F (°C)	23.9 (−4.5)	25.0 (−3.9)	31.2 (−0.4)	40.2 (4.6)	49.5 (9.7)	59.8 (15.4)	66.0 (18.9)	65.4 (18.6)	59.0 (15.0)	48.4 (9.1)	38.8 (3.8)	29.8 (−1.2)	44.8 (7.1)
Record low °F (°C)	−6 (−21)	−1 (−18)	0 (−18)	16 (−9)	27 (−3)	36 (2)	45 (7)	40 (4)	30 (−1)	23 (−5)	17 (−8)	−7 (−22)	−7 (−22)
Average precipitation inches (mm)	3.56 (90)	3.67 (93)	4.50 (114)	4.09 (104)	3.40 (86)	4.66 (118)	3.24 (82)	4.38 (111)	3.76 (96)	4.27 (108)	3.98 (101)	3.79 (96)	47.30 (1,201)
Average precipitation days (≥ 0.01 in)	9.1	8.5	10.1	11.0	11.2	9.6	8.4	8.1	8.9	8.8	9.4	11.5	114.6
Source: NOAA

== Demographics ==
Historical population
Census	Pop.	Note	%±
1870	1,819		—
1880	2,370		30.3%
1900	2,366		—
1910	3,089		30.6%
1920	3,122		1.1%
1930	3,062		−1.9%
1940	3,259		6.4%
1950	3,028		−7.1%
1960	2,608		−13.9%
1970	2,481		−4.9%
1980	2,273		−8.4%
1990	2,070		−8.9%
2000	2,048		−1.1%
2010	2,197		7.3%
2020	2,583		17.6%
U.S. Decennial Census

As of the census of 2000, there were 2,048 people, 776 households, and 446 families residing in the village. The population density was 2,142.7 inhabitants per square mile (827.3/km^{2}). There were 1,075 housing units at an average density of 1,124.7 per square mile (434.2/km^{2}). The racial makeup of the village was 76.17% White, 14.26% African American, 0.39% Asian, 0.54% Pacific Islander, 4.74% from other races, and 3.91% from two or more races. Hispanic or Latino of any race were 17.24% of the population.

There were 776 households, out of which 28.7% had children under the age of 18 living with them, 35.1% were married couples living together, 16.0% had a female householder with no husband present, and 42.5% were non-families. 34.9% of all households were made up of individuals, and 16.6% had someone living alone who was 65 years of age or older. The average household size was 2.42 and the average family size was 3.10.

In the village, the population was spread out, with 23.2% under the age of 18, 8.7% from 18 to 24, 23.7% from 25 to 44, 21.8% from 45 to 64, and 22.5% who were 65 years of age or older. The median age was 40 years. For every 100 females, there were 87.2 males. For every 100 females age 18 and over, there were 81.3 males.

The median income for a household in the village was $31,675, and the median income for a family was $36,333. Males had a median income of $36,848 versus $22,165 for females. The per capita income for the village was $17,595. About 21.2% of families and 19.7% of the population were below the poverty line, including 33.7% of those under age 18 and 11.7% of those age 65 or over.

In 2010, the breakdown was as follows:

- 53.6% White
- 34.0% Hispanic
- 10.0% Black
- 0.5% Asian
- 0.1% Native American
- 0.5% some Other Race
- 1.5% Two or More Races

== Tourism ==
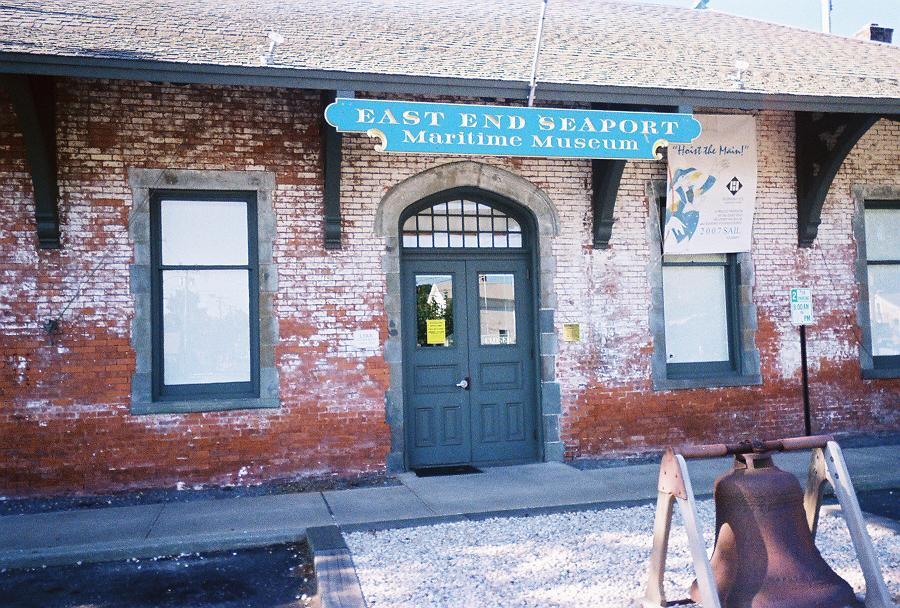
East End Seaport Museum & Marine Foundation, formerly the Greenport Railroad Station

Greenport is also known for its tourism during the summer. It has a locally famous 1920s carousel, located near the waterfront. The village is also the home of the East End Seaport Museum & Marine Foundation, which hosts the annual Maritime Festival each September. The museum is housed in the former station house of the Greenport Long Island Rail Road station, while the East end of the Railroad Museum of Long Island is located in the former freight house. The new station is the terminus of the Long Island Rail Road.

Most of the tourism stems from maritime activities, as well as proximity to the more than 40 vineyards on the East End of Long Island. It has many small shops and boutiques, ice cream parlors, bed-and-breakfasts, and restaurants ranging from fine-dining to paper-napkin crab shacks and is home to Claudio's Restaurants, the oldest single-family owned restaurant until it was sold in 2018. The building itself is over 150 years old.

== Government ==
The Mayor of the Village of Greenport is Kevin Stuessi, who was elected in March 2023.

== Education ==
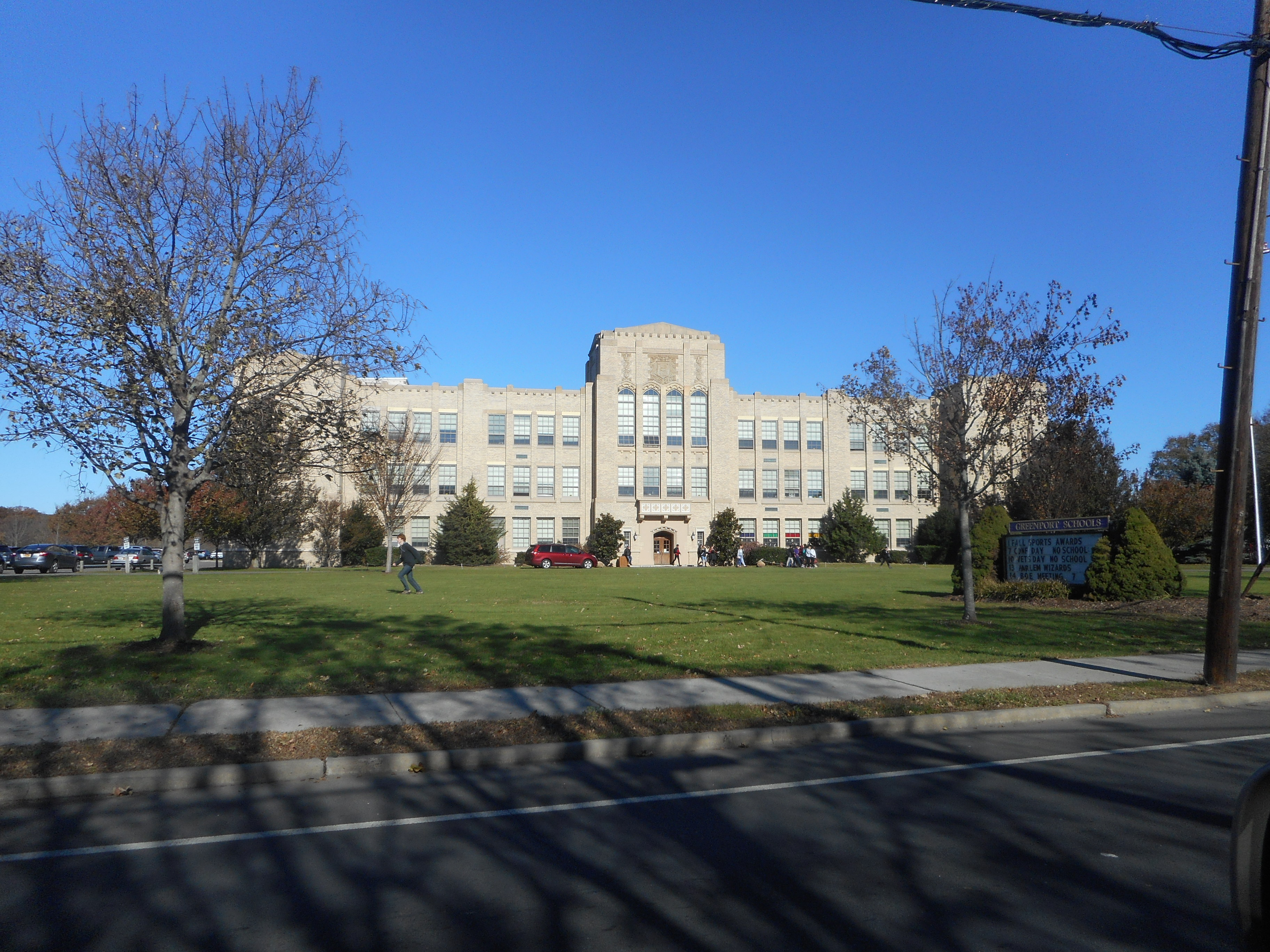
Greenport High School on NY 25 (Front Street).

The Greenport Union Free School District provides public education for all of the village.

Students from Greenport and Greenport West are zoned in the district as well as students in grade 7–12 from Orient and East Marion who go to Oysterponds Elementary School for K-6.

The Old Kindergarten Schoolhouse was Greenport's first schoolhouse. It was located on the North Road. In 1832, a larger schoolhouse was built on Front Street and Greenport students transferred to the new location. In 1879, the first kindergarten was established and the old schoolhouse was moved from the North Road to 4th Avenue and South Street (now the location of the Greenport Fire Department). Greenport students attended kindergarten in the building until 1932.

In 2005, the Old Kindergarten Schoolhouse was moved to its present site on Front Street and with oversight by the Greenport Improvement Committee, was restored with matching funds from the Village of Greenport and New York State. The building is now the Village's historic interpretive center and a venue for community meetings and events.

== Houses of worship ==
- Saints Anargyroi, Taxiarchis and Gerasimos Greek Orthodox Church, 702 Main Street, Greenport, NY 11944
- Clinton Memorial A.M.E. Zion Church, 614 3rd Street, Greenport, NY 11944
- First Baptist Church of Greenport, 654 Main Street, Greenport, NY 11944
- Holy Trinity Episcopal Church, 768 Main Street, Greenport, NY 11944
- St. Agnes Church, 523 Front Street, Greenport, NY 11944
- St. Peter's Lutheran Church, 71305 Main Road, Greenport, NY 11944
- Congregation Tifereth Israel, 500 4th Street, Greenport, NY 11944

== Transportation ==
Greenport station is the eastern terminus of the Long Island Rail Road's Main Line, where a shuttle service to Ronkonkoma with stops in other North Fork towns is available. At Ronkonkoma, passengers can connect to New York City bound trains. It is also served by Suffolk County Transit's S92 bus route, which runs from Orient Point Ferry Terminal to East Hampton via Riverhead. Hampton Jitney's North Fork Line also brings passengers to New York City.

In Greenport, train and bus passengers can connect to the North Ferry to Shelter Island where they can connect to a ferry to North Haven.

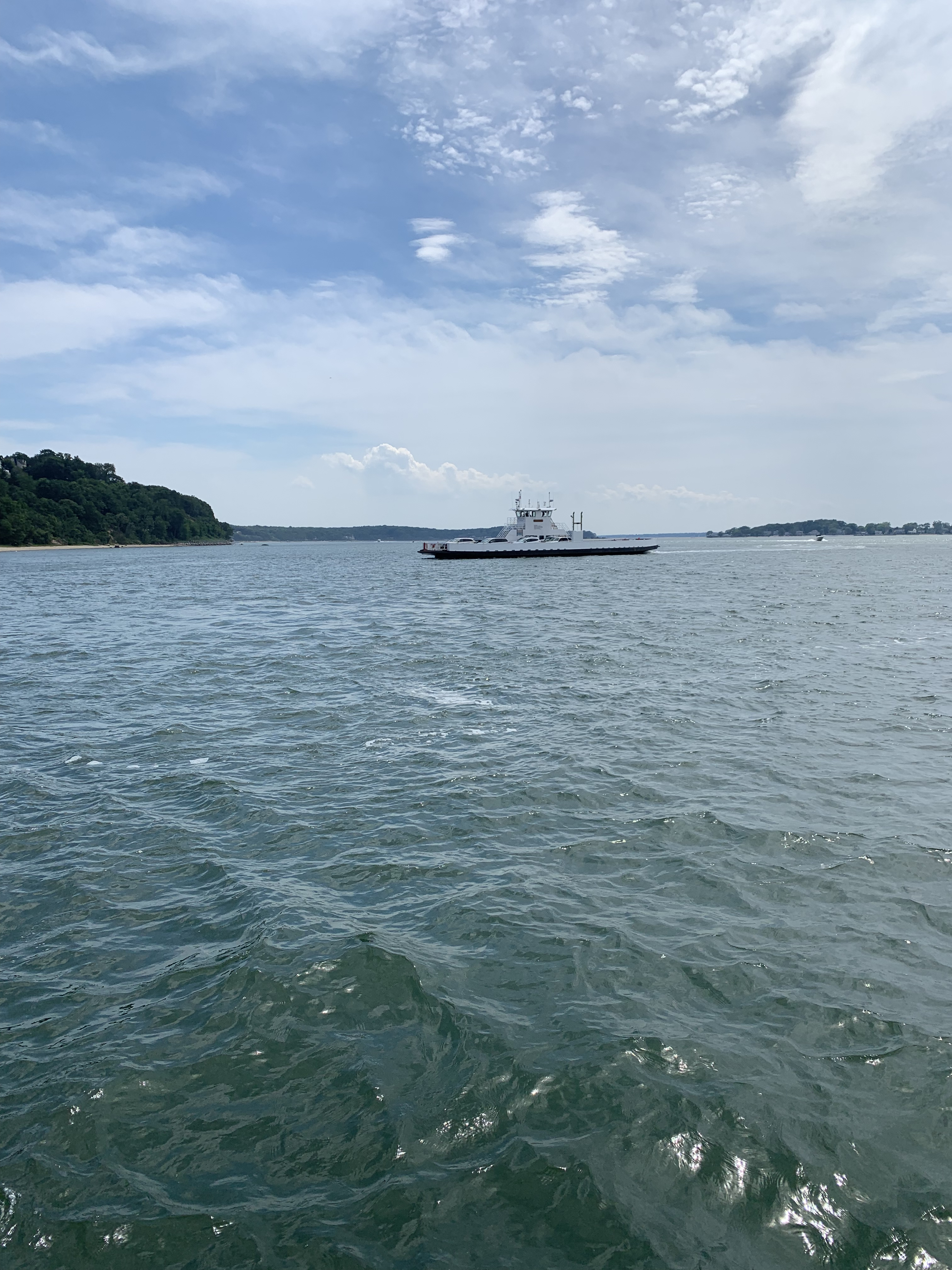
The North Ferry to/from Shelter Island

== Gallery ==
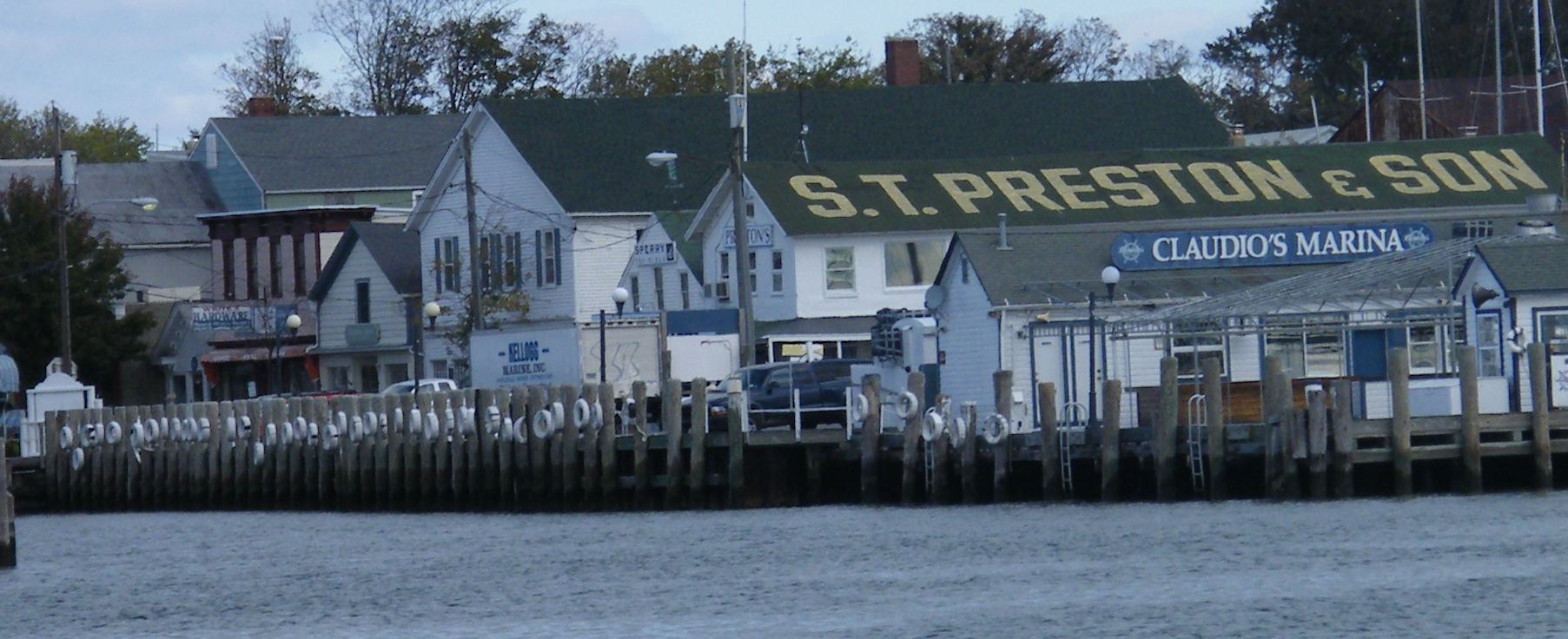
Dockside restaurants

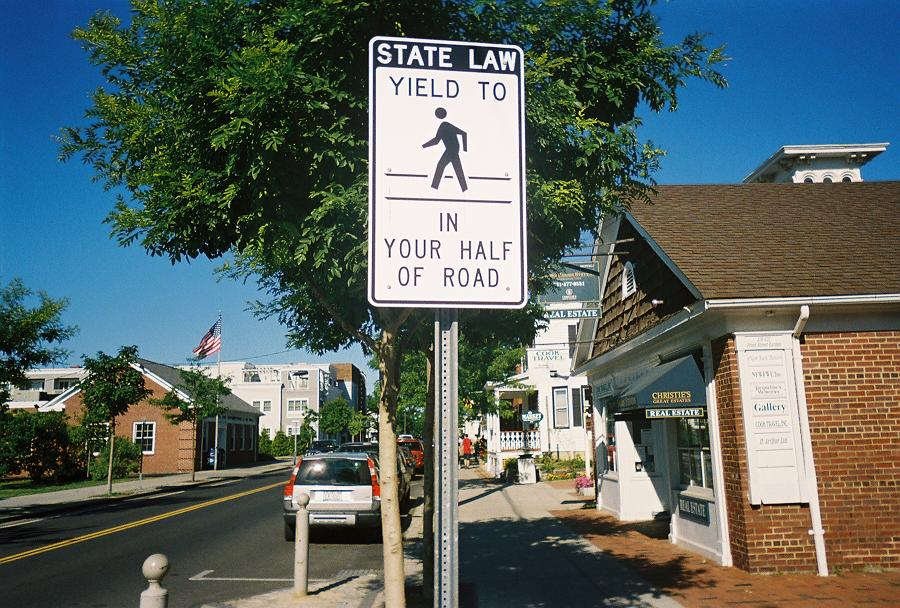
Art galleries & shopping

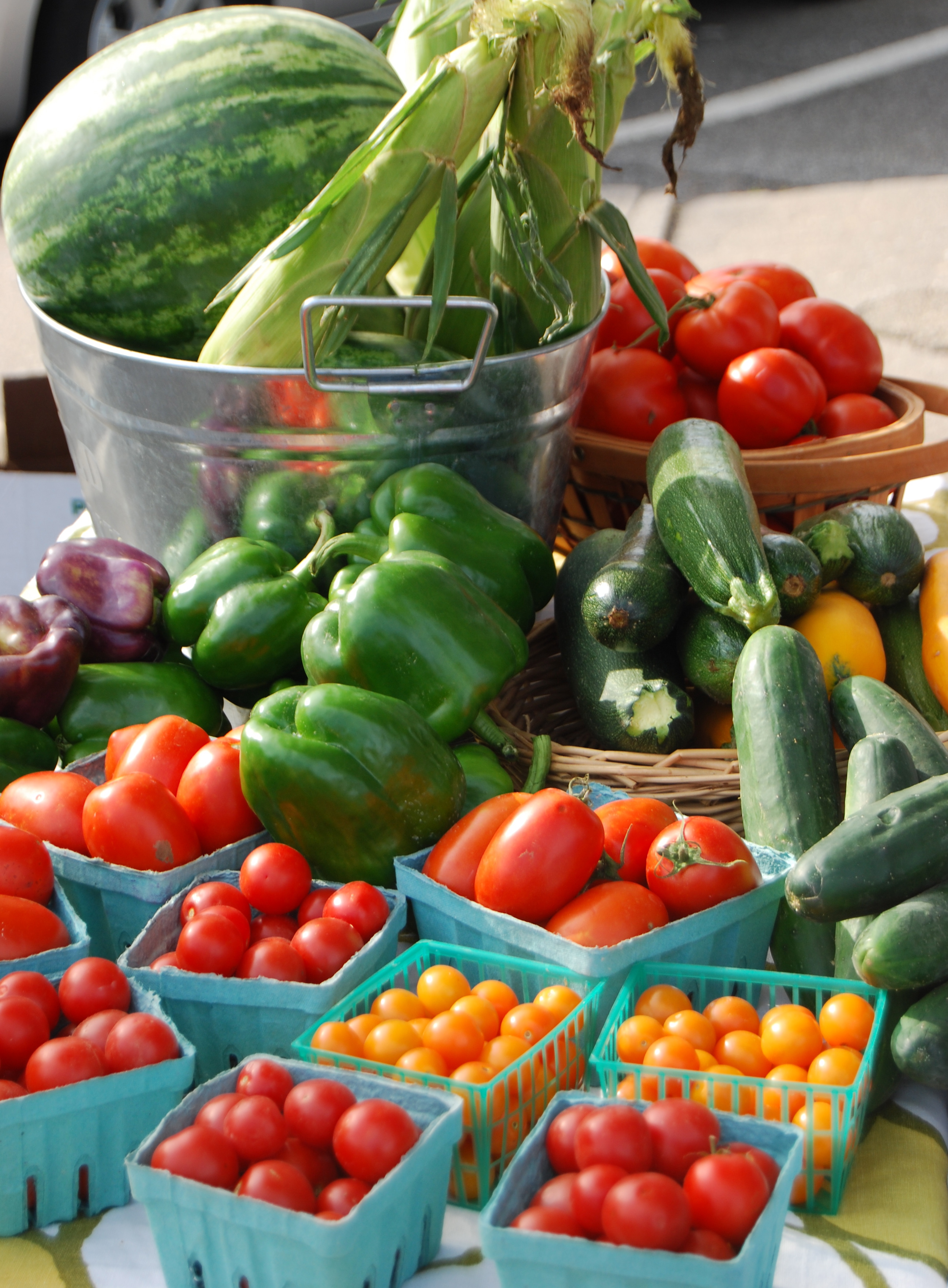
Farmers Market

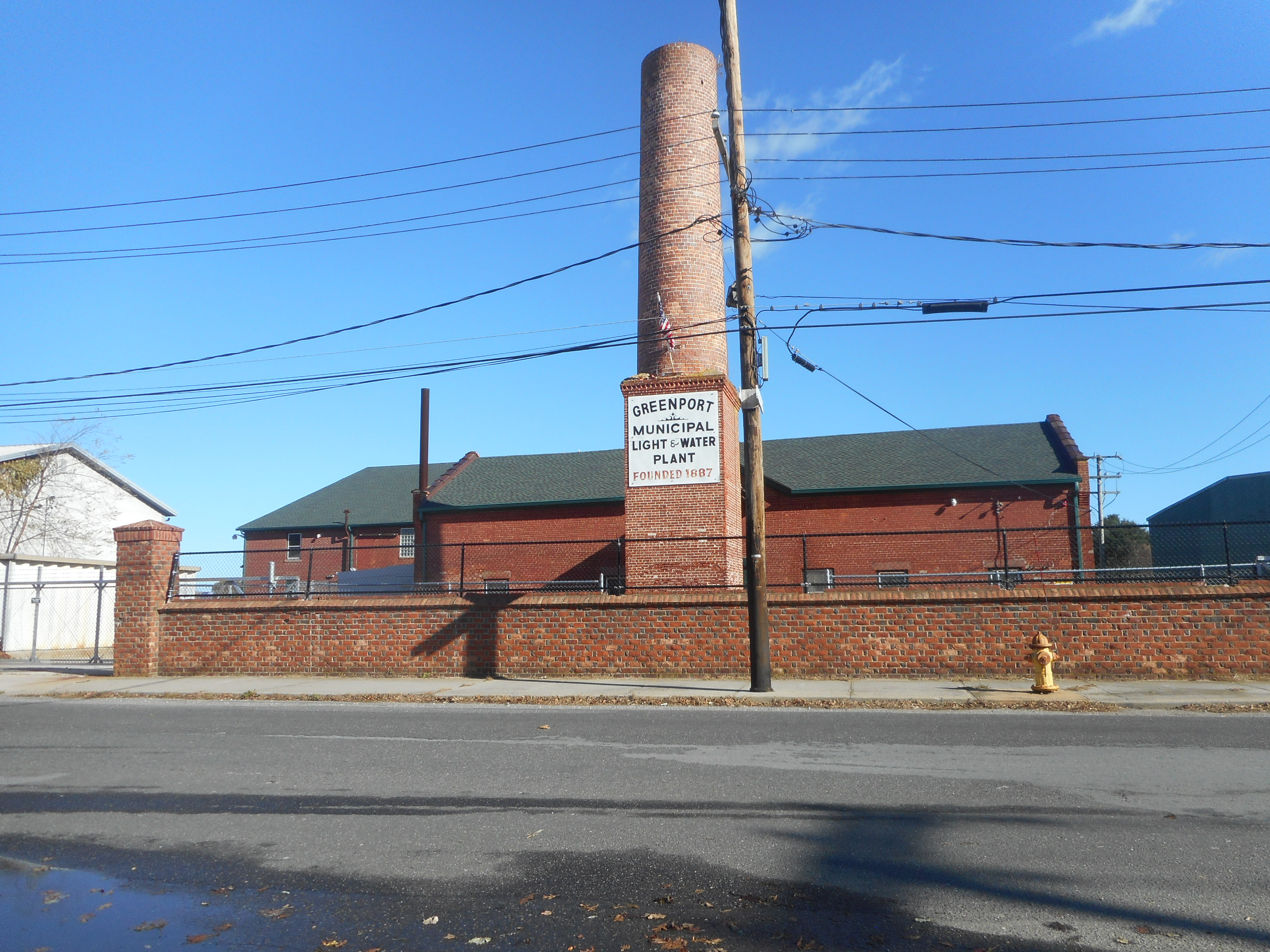
The historic Municipal Light and Water Plant on Moore's Lane.

== Sister City ==
- Parrsboro, Nova Scotia, Canada.
