= Candy Kitchen =

Candy Kitchen may refer to:

- Candy Kitchen, New Mexico, an unincorporated community in Cibola County, New Mexico
- Candy Kitchen (Bridgehampton, New York), a historic luncheonette in Bridgehampton, New York
