= Hampton Classic Horse Show =

Show jumping contest in the United States

Coordinates: 40.937831°N 72.316647°W

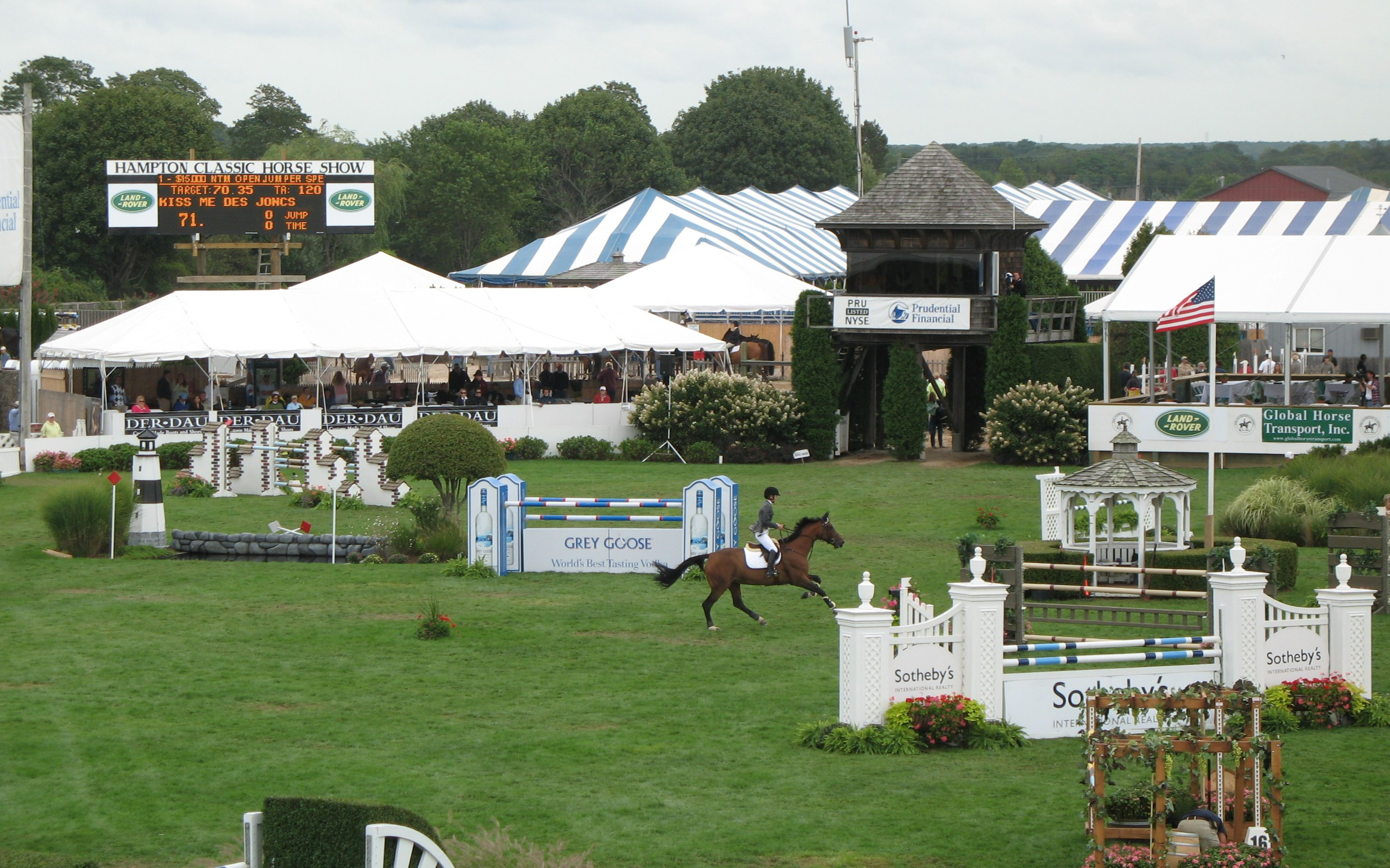
Hampton Classic in September 2006

The Hampton Classic Horse Show (generally referred to as the "Hampton Classic") is a Grand Prix event considered one of the larger show jumping contests in the United States. Held over Labor Day in Bridgehampton, part of the town of Southampton, New York, it is one of the biggest social bashes in the Hamptons scene and signals the grand finale of summer season. In 2013, the show dates were Sunday, August 25 through Sunday, September 1.

== Description ==
The roots of the show go to the early 1900s in Southampton to a show that was discontinued during World War I. It was revived in the 1920s and then discontinued again in World War II. It was revived a third time in 1959 as the "Southampton Horse Show", which was discontinued in the mid-1960s.

The current show started in 1971 by the Topping Riding Club in Sagaponack, New York, as a one-day show. In 1976 it became a five-day rated show held initially at Dune Alpin Farm in East Hampton. In 1978, its name was formally changed to the Hampton Classic, and in 1982 it moved to its present location on Snake Hollow Road, Bridgehampton.

In 2006 its web site indicated it has 1,300 horses exhibited and over $500,000 in prize money.

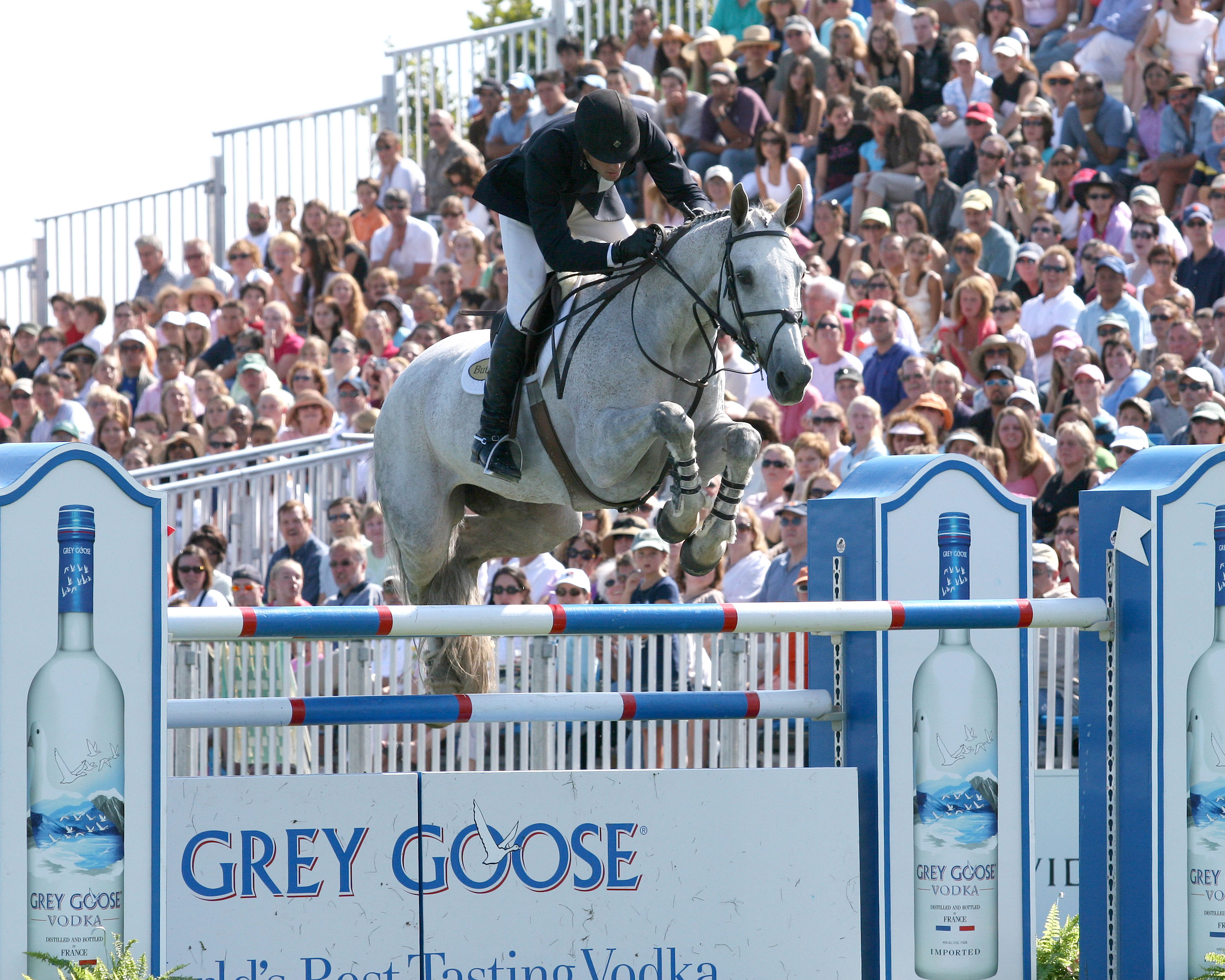
Olympic Medalist Chris Kappler, aboard his mare, VDL Oranta, competing at the $150,000 Prudential Grand Prix at the 2006 Hampton Classic.

The social scene that accompanies the show has led to heavy upscale sponsorships. Its VIP tent could house 3,000 served by white-coated waiters. Visitors promenade the grounds often with dogs and showing off elaborate hats, which are commonly worn to the prestigious Grand Prix, held on the last Sunday of the show.

The show is held at the peak of the Atlantic hurricane season, and several shows have had to deal with hurricanes or the rains associated with them. In 1976 the tents were flattened in one storm just before the show. In 2011, Hurricane Irene caused the start of the Hampton Classic to be postponed for three days. The jumping contests continue even in the rain and are discontinued only when real hazards are posed to horse and rider.

The Hampton Classic is a 501(c)(3) not-for-profit organization with a two-fold mission: to put on a world-class equestrian event and to support other local charities. The Hampton Classic makes an annual financial contribution to Southampton Hospital, and provides additional in-kind support to the hospital as well as dozens of other area charities.
