= Remsenburg-Speonk, New York =

- Census-designated place
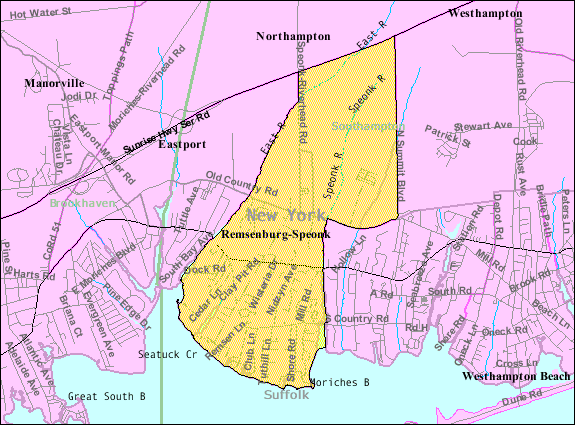

- Location within New York
- Coordinates: 40°49′13″N 72°42′4″W
- Country: United States
- State: New York
- County: Suffolk

Area
  - Total: 4.05 sq mi (10.49 km^{2})
  - Land: 3.60 sq mi (9.32 km^{2})
  - Water: 0.45 sq mi (1.17 km^{2})

Population (2020)
  - Total: 3,110
  - Density: 864.1/sq mi (333.65/km^{2})
- Time zone: UTC-5 (Eastern (EST))
  - Summer (DST): UTC-4 (EDT)
- FIPS code: 36-61142

Remsenburg-Speonk is a census-designated place (CDP) located in the Town of Southampton, Suffolk County, New York, United States. It consists of the hamlets of Remsenburg and Speonk. As of the 2020 census, Remsenburg-Speonk had a population of 3,110. The population of this CDP and surrounding ones increases in the summer due to summer renters who come out for the beaches and scenery.

== History ==
As early as 1712, meadows in Speonk were leased to cattle owners from Southampton. Most of the early residents came west from Southampton and Bridgehampton in the 1740s, building farms and clearing the forests of wood. In the 1880s, duck farms thrived in Speonk, but few survived past the turn of the century. The name Speonk was inspired by a Native American word meaning "high place". An 1897 Long Island Rail Road catalog listed Speonk, noting that that name "certainly sounds like the call of a frog". Some residents pressed to change the name to "Remsenburg", after prominent resident Charles Remsen donated a new Presbyterian church. Today, both names remain in use, each covering different areas of the community.

== Geography ==
Remsenburg-Speonk is located at 40° 49' 13" North, 72° 42' 4" West (40.820400, -72.701133). According to the United States Census Bureau, the CDP has a total area of 3.7 square miles (9.5 km^{2}), of which 3.6 square miles (9.3 km^{2}) is land and 0.077 square miles (0.2 km^{2}), or 2.20%, is water.

Historical population
Census	Pop.	Note	%±
2020	3,110		—
U.S. Decennial Census

== Demographics ==
=== 2020 census ===
As of the 2020 census, Remsenburg-Speonk had a population of 3,110. The median age was 46.9 years. 19.7% of residents were under the age of 18 and 20.4% of residents were 65 years of age or older. For every 100 females there were 92.3 males, and for every 100 females age 18 and over there were 93.8 males age 18 and over.

99.3% of residents lived in urban areas, while 0.7% lived in rural areas.

There were 1,200 households in Remsenburg-Speonk, of which 26.5% had children under the age of 18 living in them. Of all households, 55.1% were married-couple households, 16.2% were households with a male householder and no spouse or partner present, and 24.6% were households with a female householder and no spouse or partner present. About 22.3% of all households were made up of individuals and 11.6% had someone living alone who was 65 years of age or older.

There were 1,644 housing units, of which 27.0% were vacant. The homeowner vacancy rate was 3.5% and the rental vacancy rate was 6.7%.

Racial composition as of the 2020 census
Race	Number	Percent
White	2,663	85.6%
Black or African American	40	1.3%
American Indian and Alaska Native	12	0.4%
Asian	36	1.2%
Native Hawaiian and Other Pacific Islander	0	0.0%
Some other race	182	5.9%
Two or more races	177	5.7%
Hispanic or Latino (of any race)	351	11.3%

=== 2000 census ===
As of the 2000 census, there were 2,675 people, 960 households, and 697 families residing in the CDP. The population density was 450.5 inhabitants per square mile (173.9/km^{2}). There were 1,401 housing units at an average density of 235.9 per square mile (91.1/km^{2}). The racial makeup of the CDP was 94.92% White, 1.76% African American, 0.19% Native American, 0.64% Asian, 0.64% Pacific Islander, 0.71% from other races, and 1.16% from two or more races. Hispanic or Latino of any race were 5.23% of the population.

There were 960 households, out of which 35.2% had children under the age of 18 living with them, 61.6% were married couples living together, 6.5% had a female householder with no husband present, and 27.3% were non-families. 20.4% of all households were made up of individuals, and 8.0% had someone living alone who was 65 years of age or older. The average household size was 2.59 and the average family size was 3.02.

In the CDP, the population was spread out, with 23.8% under the age of 18, 4.3% from 18 to 24, 27.6% from 25 to 44, 26.8% from 45 to 64, and 17.5% who were 65 years of age or older. The median age was 42 years. For every 100 females, there were 91.3 males. For every 100 females age 18 and over, there were 88.7 males.

The median income for a household in the CDP was $72,794, and the median income for a family was $87,315. Males had a median income of $57,292 versus $40,481 for females. The per capita income for the CDP was $35,110. About 2.3% of families and 4.9% of the population were below the poverty line, including 2.6% of those under age 18 and 8.8% of those age 65 or over.
