= Southampton Union Free School District =

School district in the U.S. state of New York

Location
- Town of Southampton, NY United States

District information
- Type: Public School District
- Superintendent: Dr. Nicholas Dyno

Other information
- Website: www.southamptonschools.org

Southampton Union Free School District is a public school district located in the Town of Southampton on Long Island, in Suffolk County, New York, United States.

The total enrollment for the 2018–2019 school year was 643 students.

Until April 2016, the superintendent was Dr. Scott Farina.

== Schools ==
- Southampton Intermediate School
- Southampton Elementary School

=== Southampton High School ===
==== History ====
The school building opened in 1974 on Narrow Lane on the east side of Southampton village. Previous the high school was in a complex on the east side of the business district on Montauk Highway/Hampton Road. Most of the complex now is Town Hall for Southampton Town. The intermediate school has moved from the downtown complex to the high school super block. The elementary school still is in the complex. The earlier complex opened in 1912 and was designed by William Lawrence Bottomley is in Georgian style.

Donald Trump landed on the high school football field on Marine One Bell Boeing V-22 Osprey after flying from Trump National Golf Club Bedminster to the school on August 8, 2020, en route to a fundraiser at the home of John Paulson in Southampton and a visit to his son Donald Trump Jr. home in Bridgehampton before flying back from the school to Bedminister.

==== Notable alumni ====
- Riley Biggs, (class of 1918) NFL center
- Andre Johnson (offensive lineman), (class of 1991) NFL tackle

==== Athletics ====
The team mascot is the Mariners and the school colors are maroon and white.

===== State championships =====
- Basketball - 1999 (Class B) Champion
- Field Hockey - New York State Public High School Athletic Association 1999 Class C Champion

===== Runners up =====
Football - Long Island Football Championships - 1993 (Class 4) (New York does not have state championship in football that includes Long Island and New York City Schools)
