= Zach Erdem =

Turkish television personality and entrepreneur (born 1982)

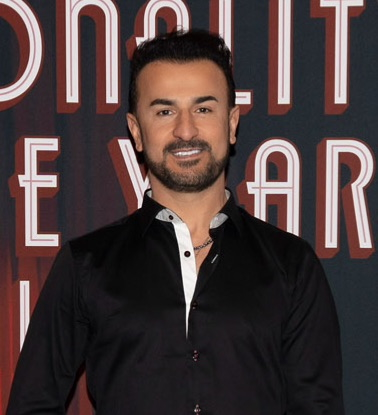
- Born: July 17, 1982 (age 44); Erzincan, Turkey
- Occupations: Television personality, restaurateur, hotelier, and entrepreneur

Zach Erdem (born July 17, 1982) is a Turkish television personality, restaurateur, hotelier, and entrepreneur. He is an owner and partner in several Long Island-based restaurants, nightclubs, and hotels including 75 Main Restaurant and Lounge and Pop-Up by Rocco in Southampton, New York. Erdem and his staff appear on American reality television show Serving the Hamptons.

== Personal life ==
Erdem was born and raised in Erzincan, Turkey to mother Seriban and father Gazi Erdem. He is the second youngest of six brothers. He grew up in a remote mountain village in Turkey, where he worked long summer days farming with his family and shepherding animals from dawn to dusk. With no roads, electricity, or televisions, life was harsh and isolating, especially during the winters. He discovered a newspaper near a railroad showing pictures of New York City. He kept the page hidden for years, hoping to move to New York someday, in 2002, he finally arrived in New York, turning the vision of his childhood into reality.

=== Education ===
Erdem attended middle school in Erzincan and completed high school education in Istanbul. He then pursued higher education at the University of Edirne and received a Business Finance Degree in 2001. The following year, he moved to the USA.

== Career ==
In 2002, he left Turkey for New York with little money and no personal contacts. He was homeless and penniless until he was hired as a dishwasher. He worked in the food service industry in various cities including Miami, Los Angeles, and Las Vegas, eventually returning to New York, and settled in Southampton, NY, where he took job as a dishwasher at 75 Main Street Restaurant and Lounge. Working his way up through hard work and perseverance, he bought the restaurant in 2010. The restaurant became a fixture in the Village of Southampton, and has been featured on Keeping Up With the Kardashians, Real Housewives of New York, and his reality show, Serving the Hamptons currently featured on HBO Max.

Tastemakers such as Kelsey Grammer, and Kendall Jenner have bartended and launched their alcoholic beverage brands at this location. Celebrity patrons include Jay Z, Beyonce, Jenifer Lopez, Anthony Hopkins, Kim Kardashian, Courtney Kardashian, Kendall Jenner, Kylie Jenner, Serena Williams, Timothee Chalamet, Barbara Walters, Jon Bon Jovi, Jodie Foster, Ivana Trump, Howard Stern, Leonardo DiCaprio, Joe Bidden, Paris Hilton, Brooke Shields, Rapper 6ix9ine, Joel "The Process" Embiid, Anthony Scaramucci, John Catsimatidis, and Robert Kraft.

Erdem subsequently opened Pop-Up by Rocco, (formerly Blu Mar Restaurant), Harpoon House Hotel, and Main Room Nightclub at the same venue. During 2023 these ventures were followed by expansion to the North Fork, where Erdem opened the Mediterranean restaurant ZErdem, and ZEY Hotel, along with the restaurant and lounge, Café 75, in Greenport, New York.

== Restaurants and Hotels ==
=== Southampton, NY ===
- 75 Main Restaurant and Lounge: 75 Main Street, Southampton, NY. A popular upscale Hampton, NY restaurant and bar, opened in 2010, known for its trendy, contemporary atmosphere and celebrity sightings, and the culinary expertise of award-winning Chef Mark Militello.
- Pop Up by Rocco aka Blu Mar formerly Kozu: 136 Main Street, Southampton. A three Michelin star restaurant serving Italian coastal cuisine in the heart of the Hamptons, curated by award-winning Chef Rocco DiSpirito.
- Harpoon House Bed and Breakfast aka Hotel ZE: 136 Main Street, Southampton, NY. Historical boutique hotel with inspired Tulum design. The house, formerly known as the Old Post House, was originally built in 1648 and considered one of the first homes in the Village of Southampton.
- Main Room aka Buddha Lounge: 136 Main Street, Southampton, NY. Upscale lounge, opened 2024.
- AM Nightclub: 125 Tuckahoe Lane, Southampton, NY. Celebrity night club, 2016-2020.
- Summer House Nightclub Lounge: 256 Elm Street, Southampton, NY. Summer lounge, 2016-2019.

=== Greenport, NY ===
- ZErdem Hospitality: 314 Main St, Greenport, NY. Mediterranean and Greek restaurant specializing in local fresh produce and fish.
- Café 75: 441 Main St, Greenport, NY. American cuisine cafe offering breakfast and lunch.
- ZEY Hotel: 437-441 Main St, Greenport, NY. A contemporary modern boutique hotel in the heart of Greenport, adjacent to Café 75.

== Serving the Hamptons Reality TV ==
The American reality television show Serving the Hamptons premiered April 7, 2022 on Discovery+. Seasons 2 and 3 of the show were picked up by HBO Max, its current streaming platform. The reality TV show features employees and patrons from his eateries and nightlife venues.

== Philanthropy, Honors, and Awards ==
Erdem's charitable work includes partnering with local churches and not for profits to provide meals, supporting the earthquake relief efforts in Turkey and Syria, and contributing to schools, regional museums and animal rescue organizations.

Erdem is the recipient of the 2026 TOA (Turks of America) Most Influential in Business Award for Hospitality and Excellence. In addition, he received the American Academy of Hospitality Sciences Star Diamond Award and was nominated for Long Island Business News 40 Under 40 Award. In 2024, he was an honored guest and panel speaker for Forbes' Luxury and Retail Industry Business Bridges event.

== Quotes ==
- Change is good when you are in charge of it.
- You have to imagine something special and then never stop building it.
- God is always watching you and hard work and smart work pays off.

== Gallery ==
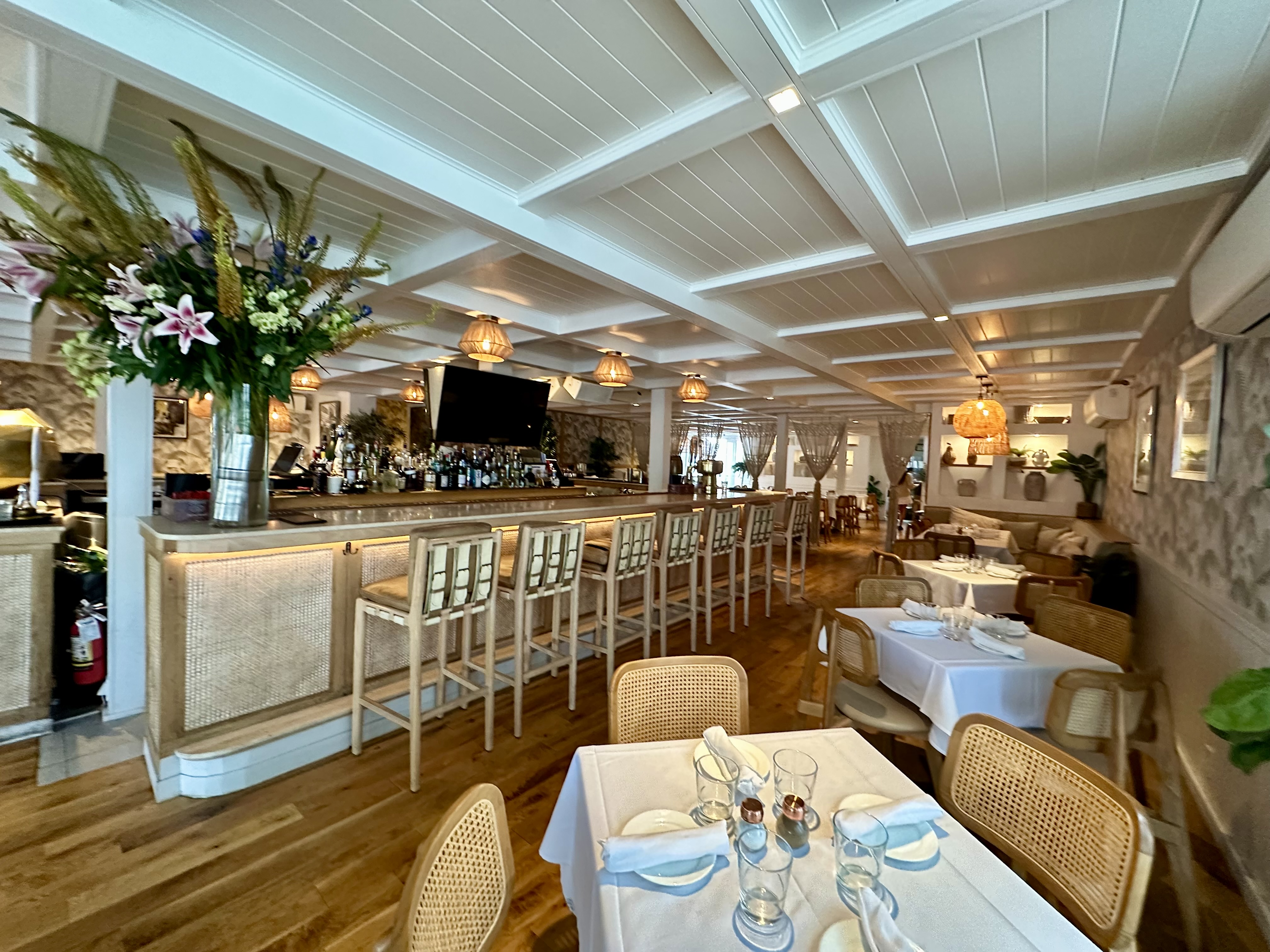
75 Main Restaurant and Lounge, Southampton, NY

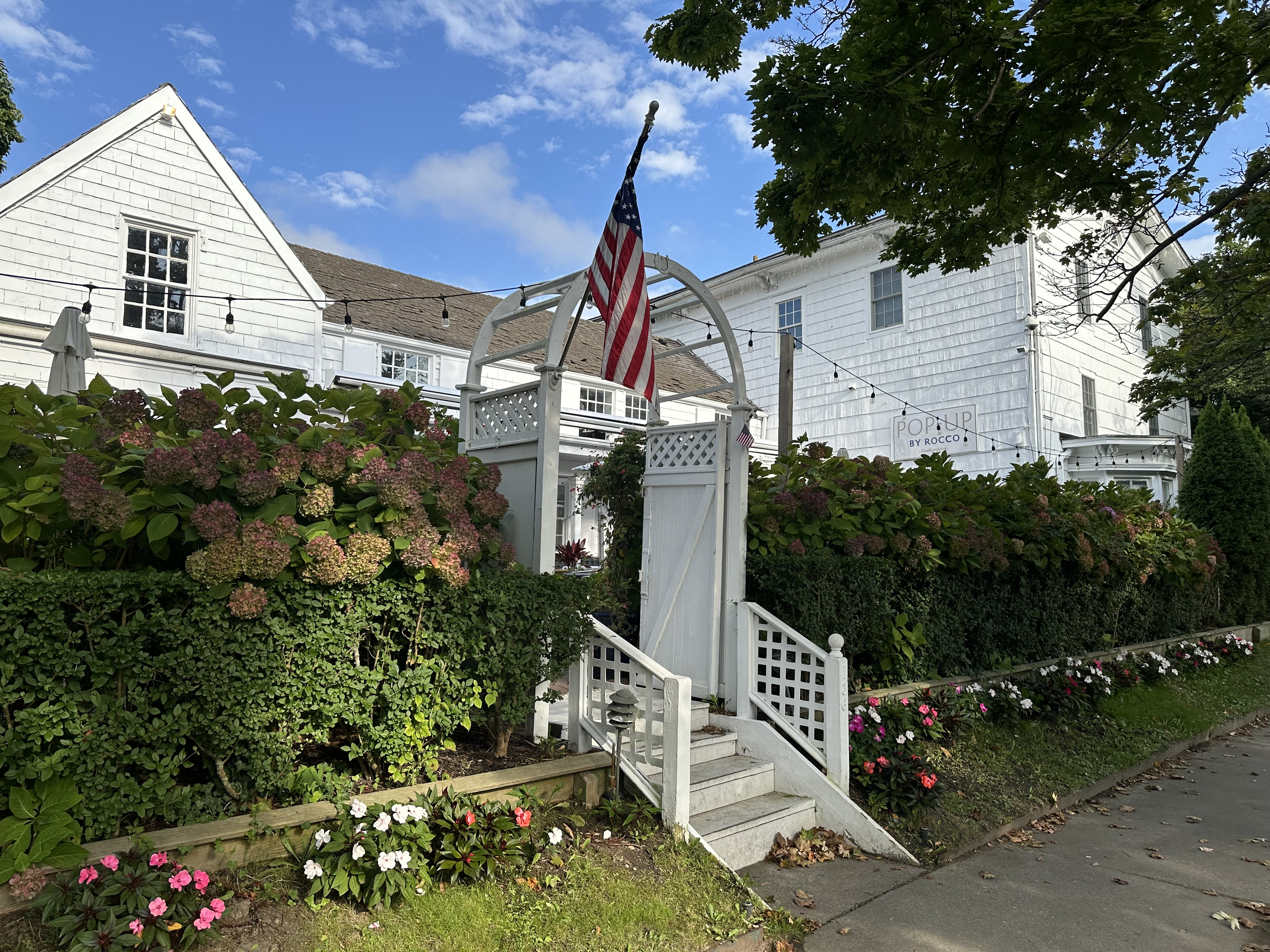
Pop-up by Rocco, Southampton, NY

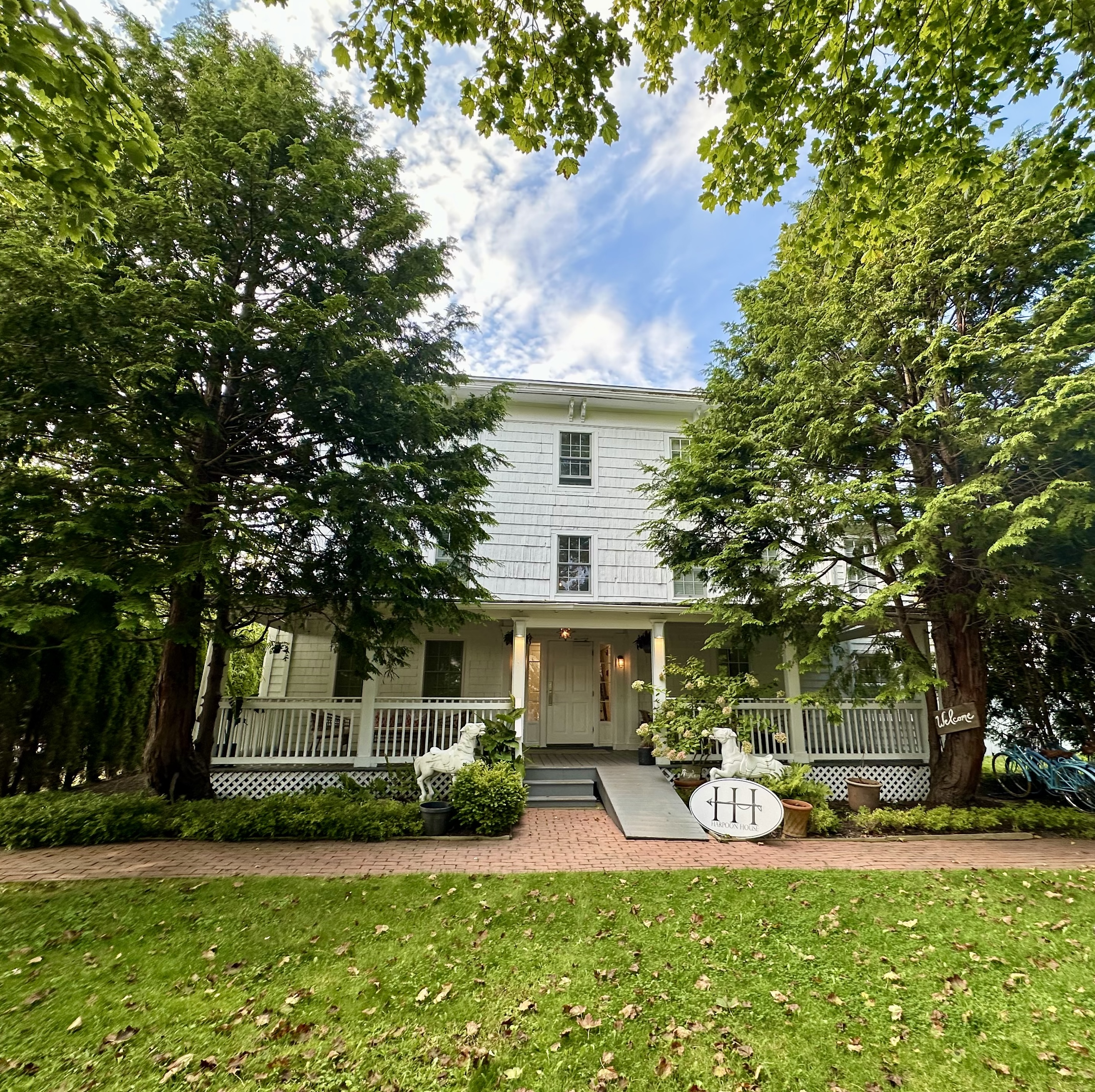
Harpoon House Bed and Breakfast, Southampton, NY

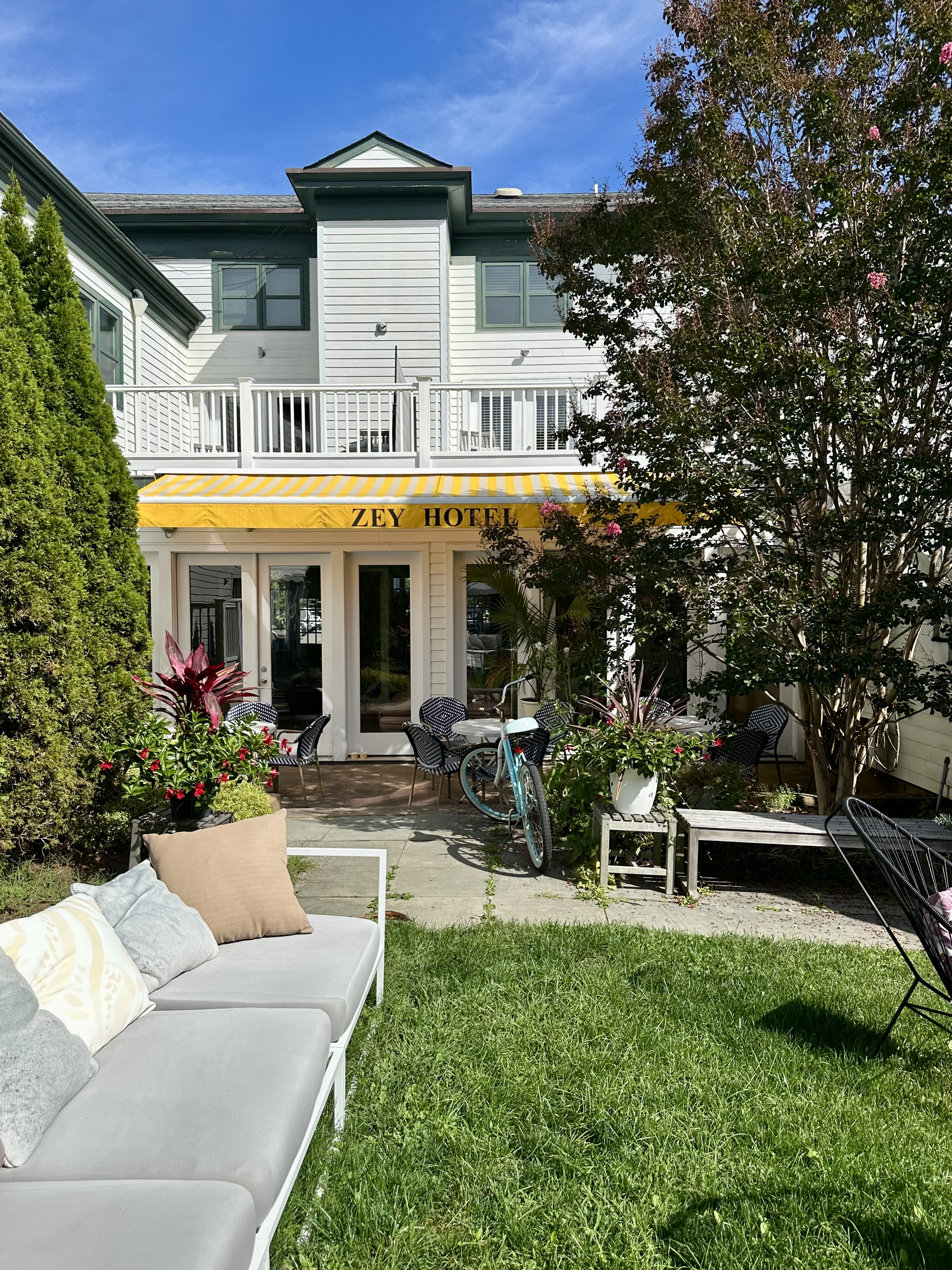
Zey Hotel, Greenport, NY

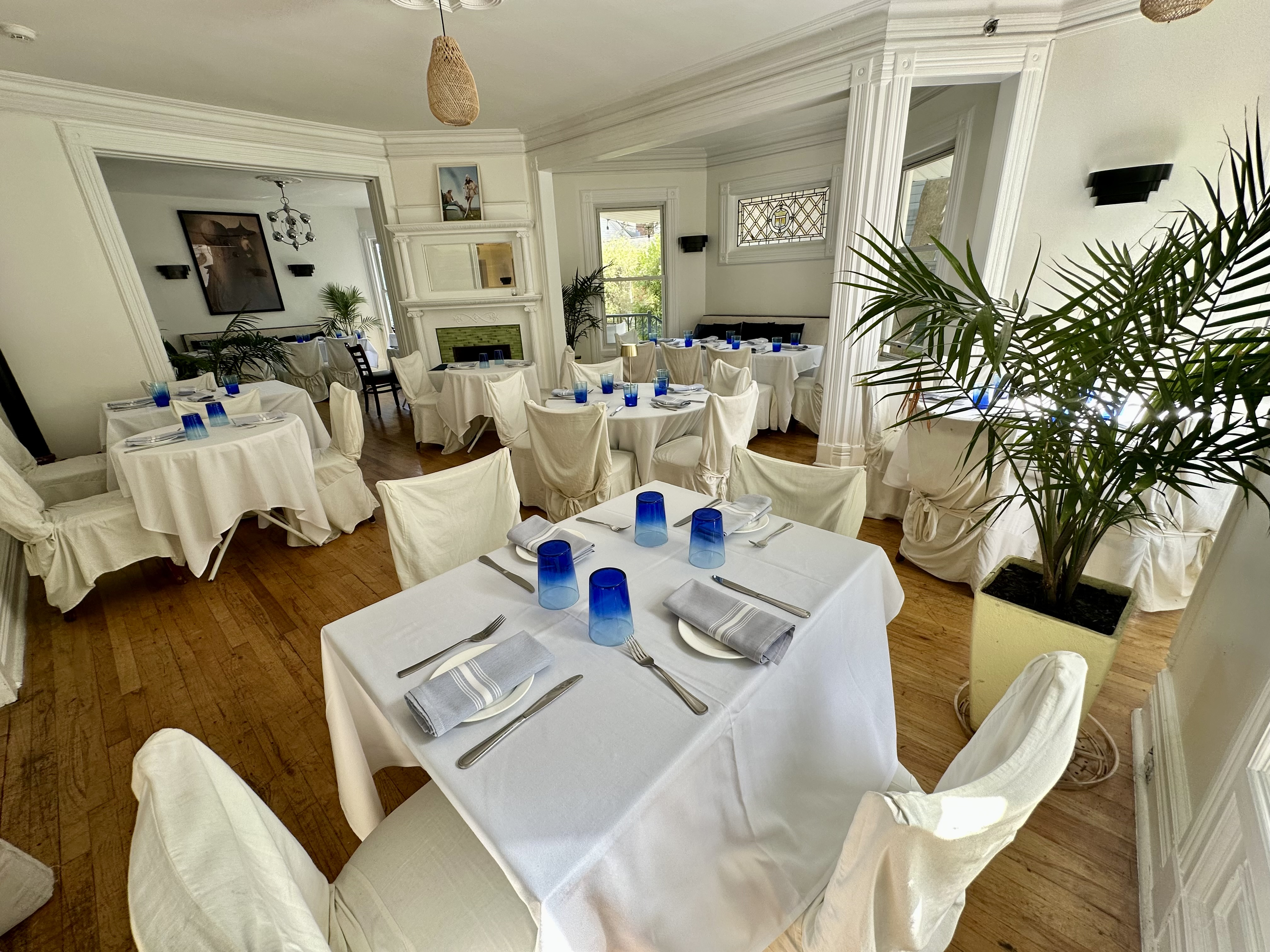
ZErdem Hospitality, Greenport, NY
