= Andre Johnson (offensive lineman) =

American football player (born 1973)

No. 70
- Position: Offensive tackle

Personal information
- Born: August 25, 1973 (age 53); Southampton, New York, U.S.
- Listed height: 6 ft 5 in (1.96 m)
- Listed weight: 314 lb (142 kg)

Career information
- High school: Southampton
- College: Penn State
- NFL draft: 1996: 1st round, 30th overall pick

Career history
- Washington Redskins (1996); Miami Dolphins (1997); Detroit Lions (1997–1998)

Awards and highlights
- Second-team All-Big Ten (1995)

Career NFL statistics
- Games played: 3
- Stats at Pro Football Reference

Andre T. Johnson (born August 25, 1973) is an American former professional football player who was an offensive tackle in the National Football League for the Washington Redskins (1996), the Miami Dolphins (1997), and the Detroit Lions (1997–1998). He played college football at Penn State University and was selected with the 30th overall pick in the first round of the 1996 NFL draft by the Washington Redskins, who were looking for a replacement of their aging tackle Jim Lachey. In his NFL career Johnson only played three games, each for the Lions and is usually considered to be one of the worst first round picks of all time.
