= Isaac Sandford =

Isaac Sandford (c. 1796 - November 21, 1853) was a Brigadier General, settler, farmer, and railroad contractor in the United States. He fought in the Black Hawk War. He worked as a contractor for the Indianapolis & St. Louis Railroad. He acquired some 12,000 acres in Indiana and Illinois.

He was born in Bridgehampton, New York to Ezekiel Sandford and Hannah Halsey Sandford.

In 1819, he married Belinda Foster, daughter of Luke and Esther Hubbell Foster. Sandford eventually moved to Cincinnati, Ohio, where his sister was married to a prominent banker, and then settled in Vermilion, Illinois. Sandford was a member of the Methodist Episcopal Church.

He was involved in establishing Sandford, Indiana. A letter to him survives. Northern Illinois University has a photograph of him from the 1903 book in the Black Hawk War by Frank E. Stevens.

His children included Harriet Sandford (died 1862).
