= Riley Biggs =

American football player (1900–1971)

No. 19, 36
- Positions: Center, guard

Personal information
- Born: March 24, 1900; Montgomery County, Texas, U.S.
- Died: March 24, 1971 (aged 71); Liberty, Texas, U.S.
- Listed height: 6 ft 2 in (1.88 m)
- Listed weight: 230 lb (104 kg)

Career information
- High school: Southampton (Southampton, New York)
- College: Baylor

Career history
- Rock Island Independents (1926); New York Giants (1926–1927)

Awards and highlights
- NFL champion (1927)
- Stats at Pro Football Reference

Riley Edgar Biggs (March 24, 1900 – November 24, 1971) was an American professional football player who played in the National Football League (NFL) for the New York Giants. He played college football at Baylor University. He was also a member of the Rock Island Independents of the American Football League (AFL).

== Early life and college ==
Riley Edgar Biggs was born on March 24, 1900, in Montgomery County, Texas. He attended Southampton High School in Southampton, New York.

He was a member of the Baylor Bears of Baylor University from 1922 to 1924 and a two-year letterman from 1923 to 1924.

== Professional career ==
Biggs signed with the Rock Island Independents of the American Football League (AFL) in 1926. He played in six games, starting four, for the Independents during the 1926 AFL season before being released. He was listed as a center and guard with the Independents.

Biggs then signed with the New York Giants of the National Football League (NFL) in 1926 and played in three games, starting two, for them during the 1926 NFL season. He appeared in ten games, starting three, for the Giants in 1927. The Giants were named NFL champions that season. He became a free agent after the 1927 season. He was listed as a center and guard with the Giants.

== Personal life ==
Biggs died on November 24, 1971, in Liberty, Texas.
