= Candy Kitchen (Bridgehampton, New York) =

Historic luncheonette in Bridgehampton, New York

- U.S. Historic district
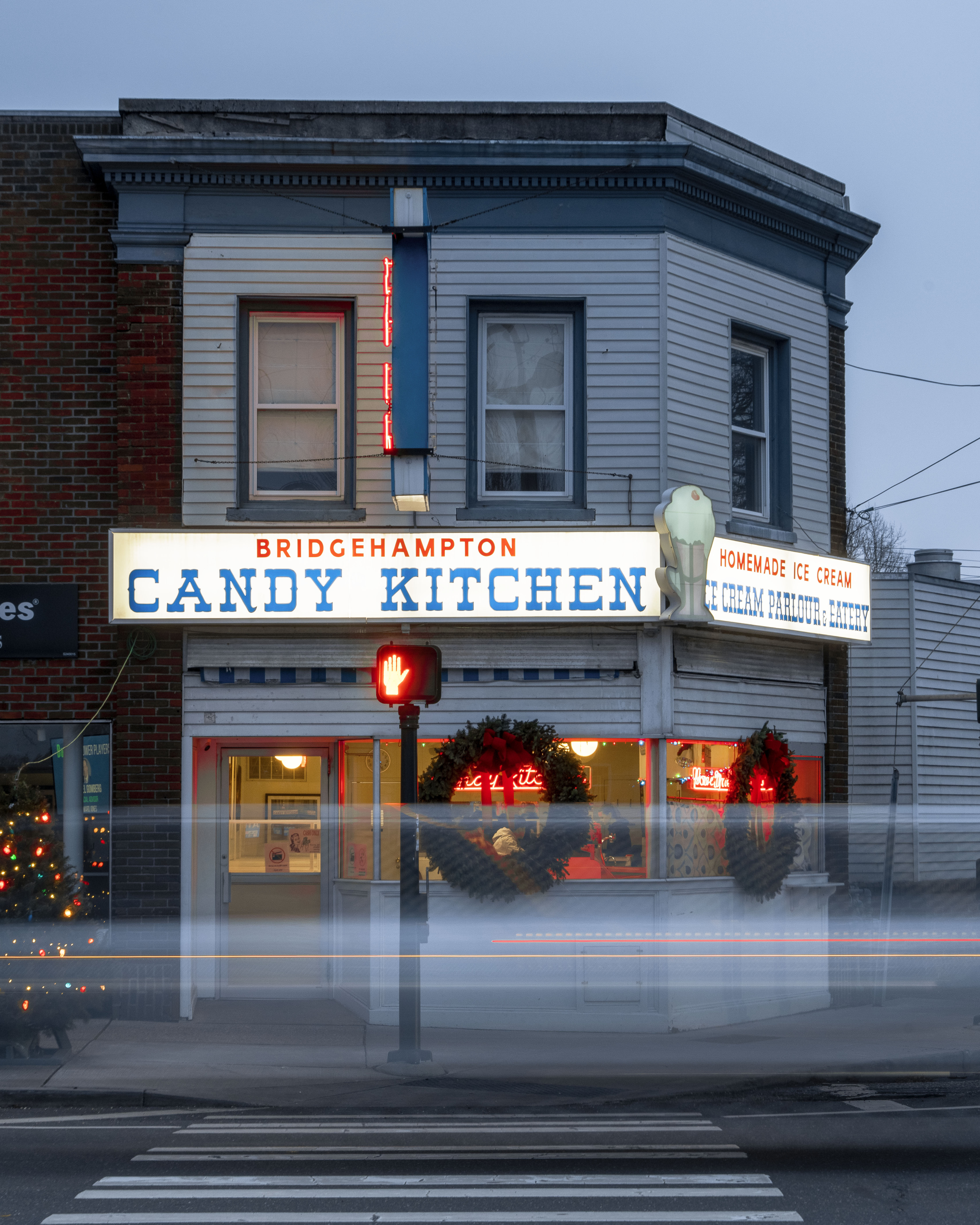
- Exterior in 2025

- Location within New York
- Location: 2391 Montauk Highway, Bridgehampton, New York
- Coordinates: 40°56′09″N 72°18′18″W
- Built: 1925
- MPS: Bridgehampton Bull’s Head–Main Street Historic Overlay District
- Added to NRHP: December 21, 2023

Candy Kitchen is a historic luncheonette in Bridgehampton, New York. It opened on May 2, 1925, and has operated continuously as a neighborhood restaurant known for counter service, house-made ice cream, and a prominent neon sign on Montauk Highway.

== History ==
Candy Kitchen opened in 1925 as an ice-cream parlor and luncheonette established by Greek immigrant George Stavropoulos. The Laggis family purchased the business in 1981 and continues to operate it with much of the original menu and interior intact. The building is a two-story corner storefront with its original recessed entrance, terrazzo floor, and classic soda-fountain elements including booth and counter seating. They also retained long-standing practices such as operating on a cash-only basis and continuing in-house ice cream production.

== In popular culture ==
The luncheonette was mentioned in the series finale of HBO's Succession (May 2023), when Kendall Roy recalls a childhood promise made to him “at the Candy Kitchen in Bridgehampton.”

== See also ==
- Diner
- Bridgehampton, New York
