= Southampton, New York =

- Town
- Town of Southampton
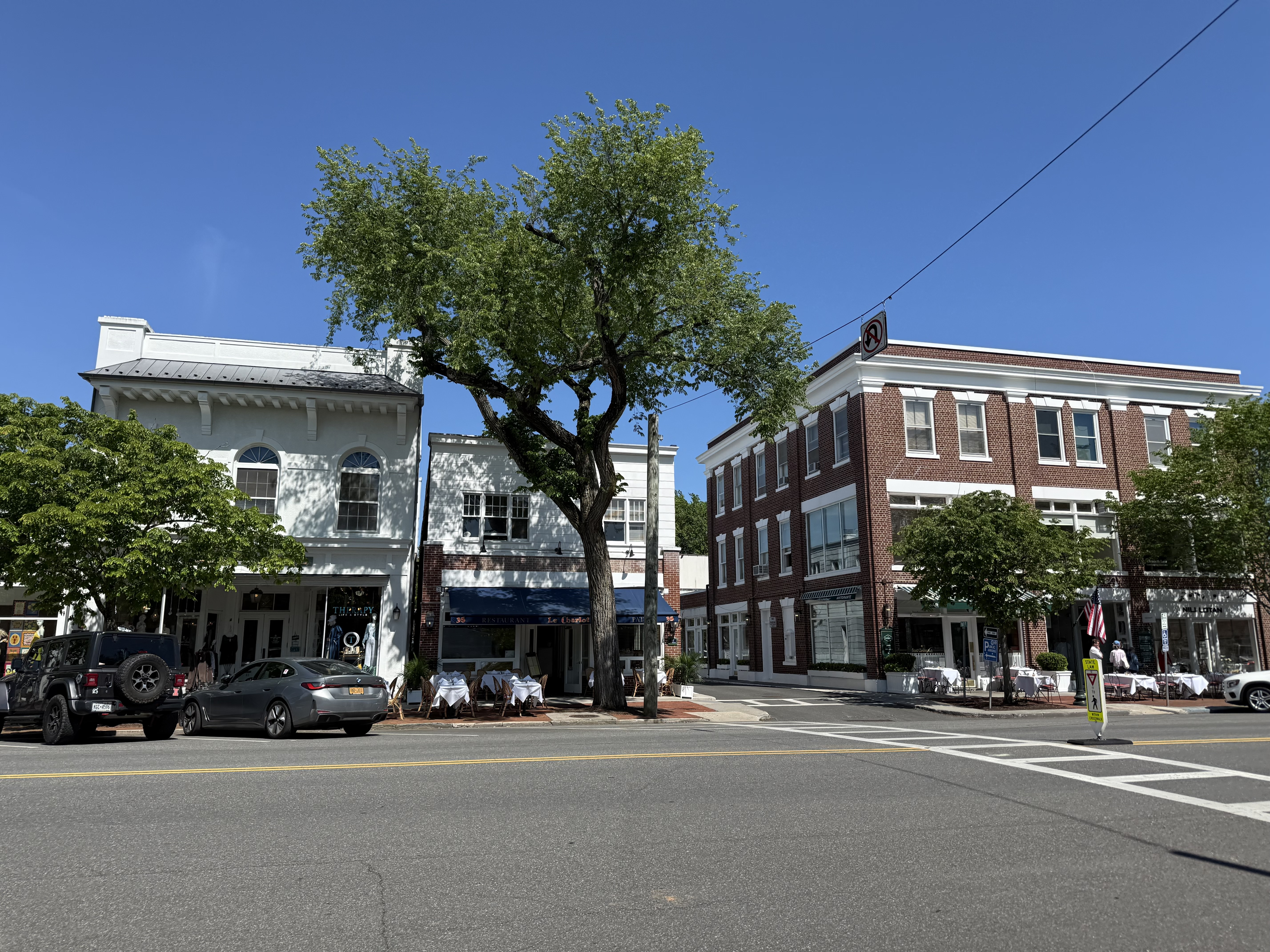
- Southampton village within the Town of Southampton

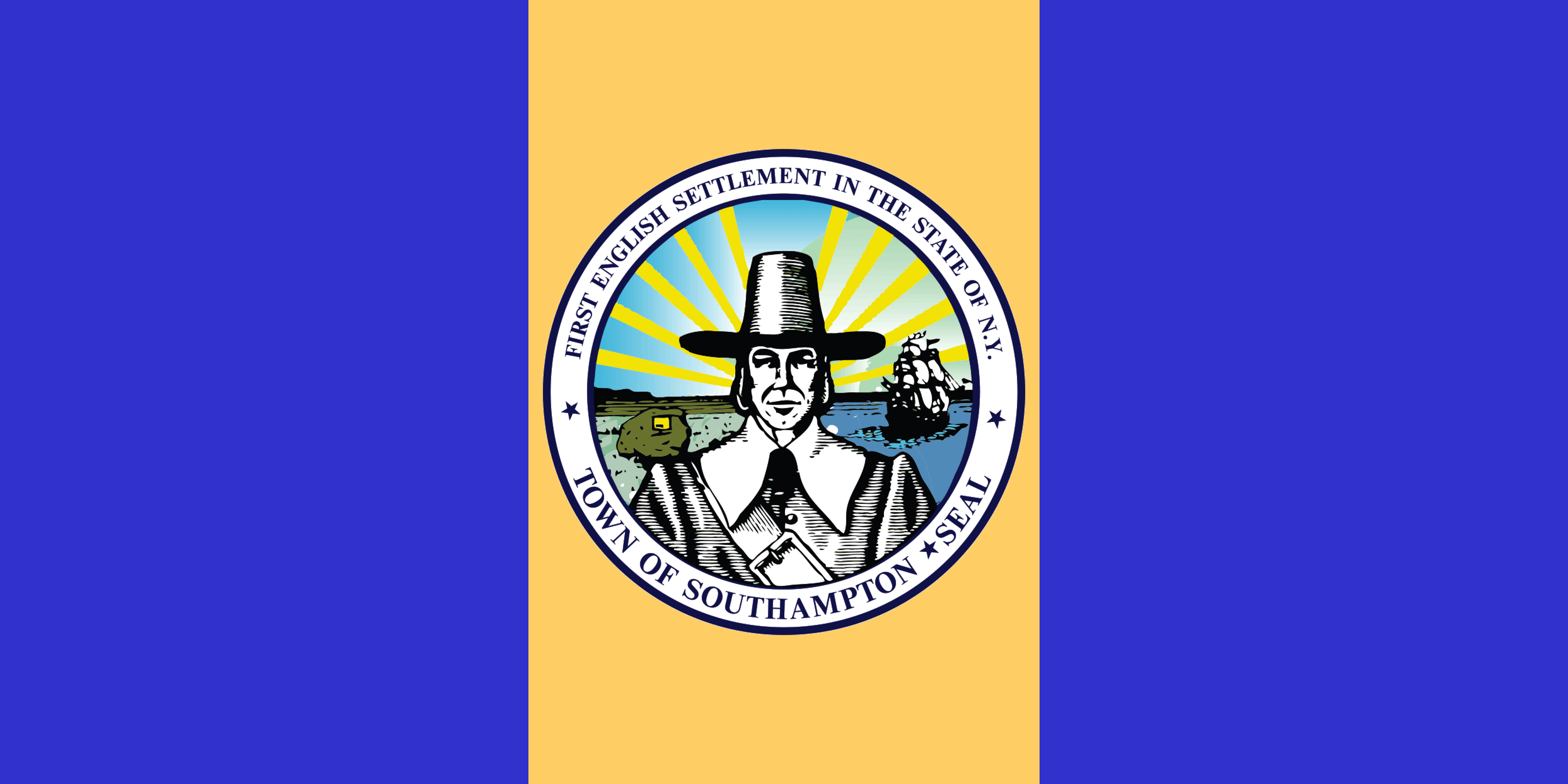
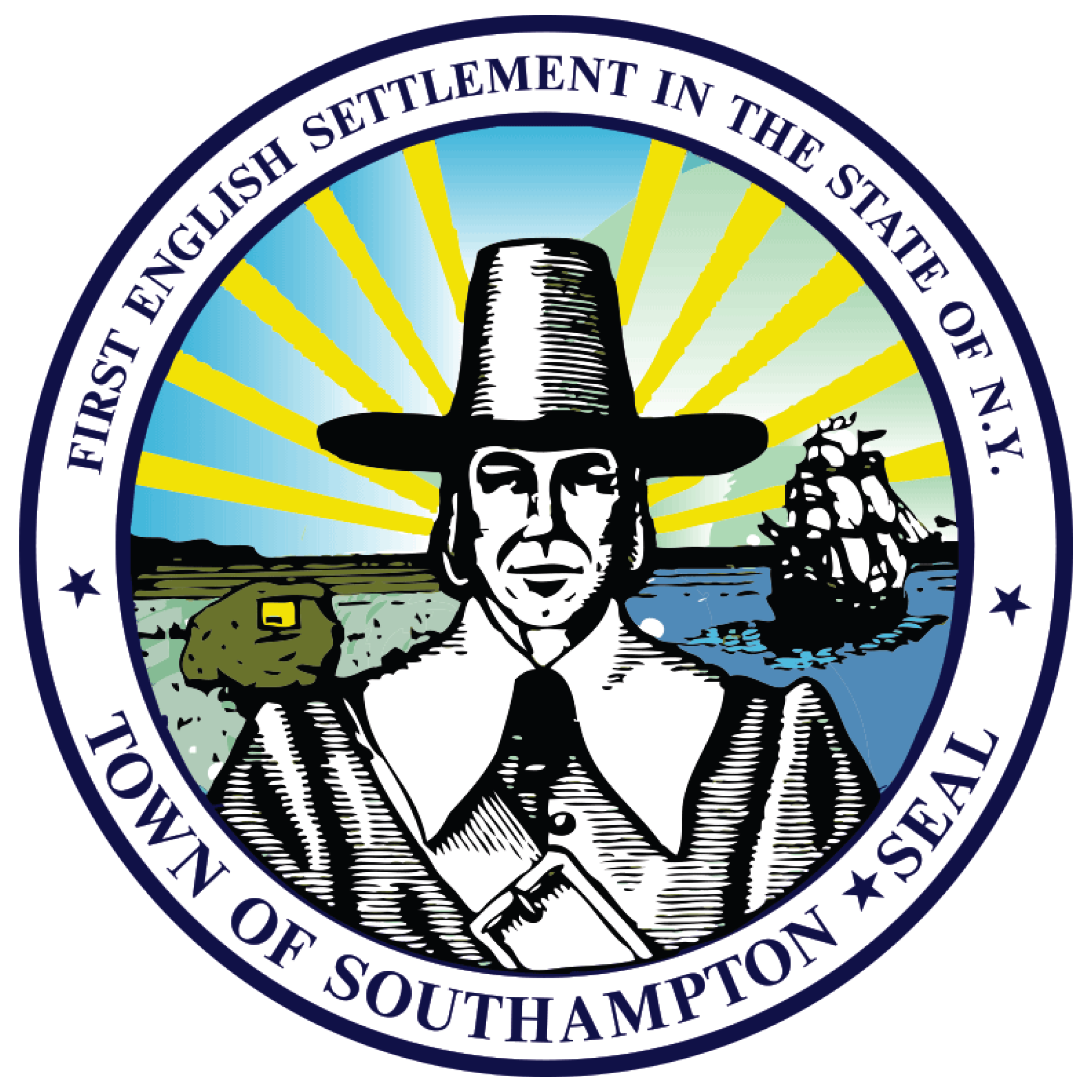
- Flag Seal

- Location in Suffolk County
- Coordinates: 40°53′7″N 72°23′43″W
- Country: United States
- State: New York
- County: Suffolk
- Established: 1640

Government
  - Type: Civil township
  - Supervisor: Maria Moore (D)

Area
  - Total: 293.46 sq mi (760.06 km^{2})
  - Land: 139.13 sq mi (360.35 km^{2})
  - Water: 154.33 sq mi (399.71 km^{2})
- Elevation: 26 ft (8 m)

Population (2020)
  - Total: 69,036
  - Density: 496.2/sq mi (191.58/km^{2})
- Time zone: UTC−5 (Eastern (EST))
  - Summer (DST): UTC−4 (EDT)
- ZIP Codes: 11968-11969
- Area code: 631
- FIPS code: 36-103-68473
- GNIS feature ID: 0965893
- Website: www.southamptontownny.gov

Southampton, officially the Town of Southampton, is a town in southeastern Suffolk County, New York, partly on the South Fork of Long Island. As of the 2020 U.S. census, the town had a population of 69,036. Southampton is included in the stretch of shoreline prominently known as the Hamptons.

Stony Brook University has a campus in Southampton.

== History ==
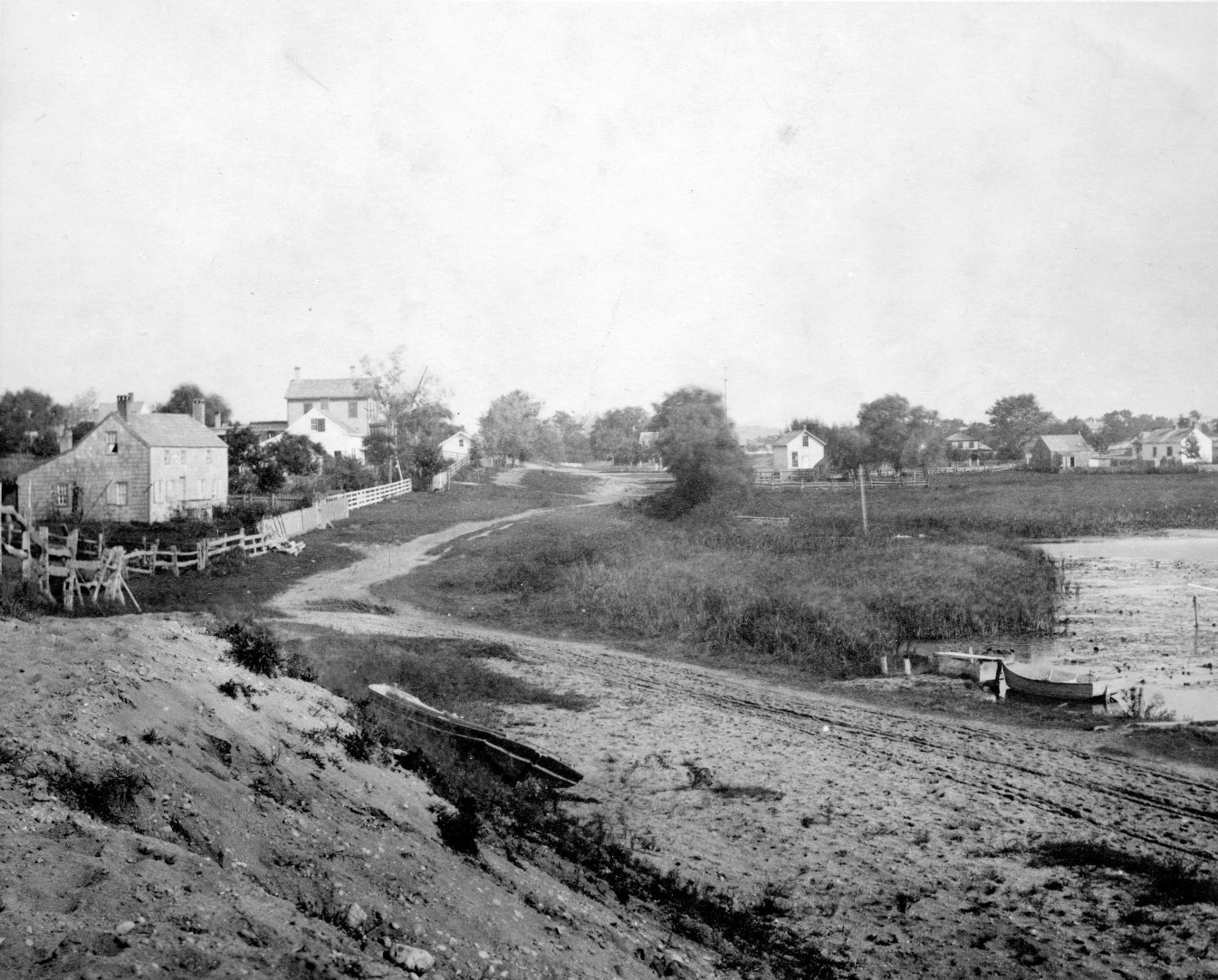
East Side of Pond, South Hampton, Long Island, c. 1872–1887, George Bradford Brainerd

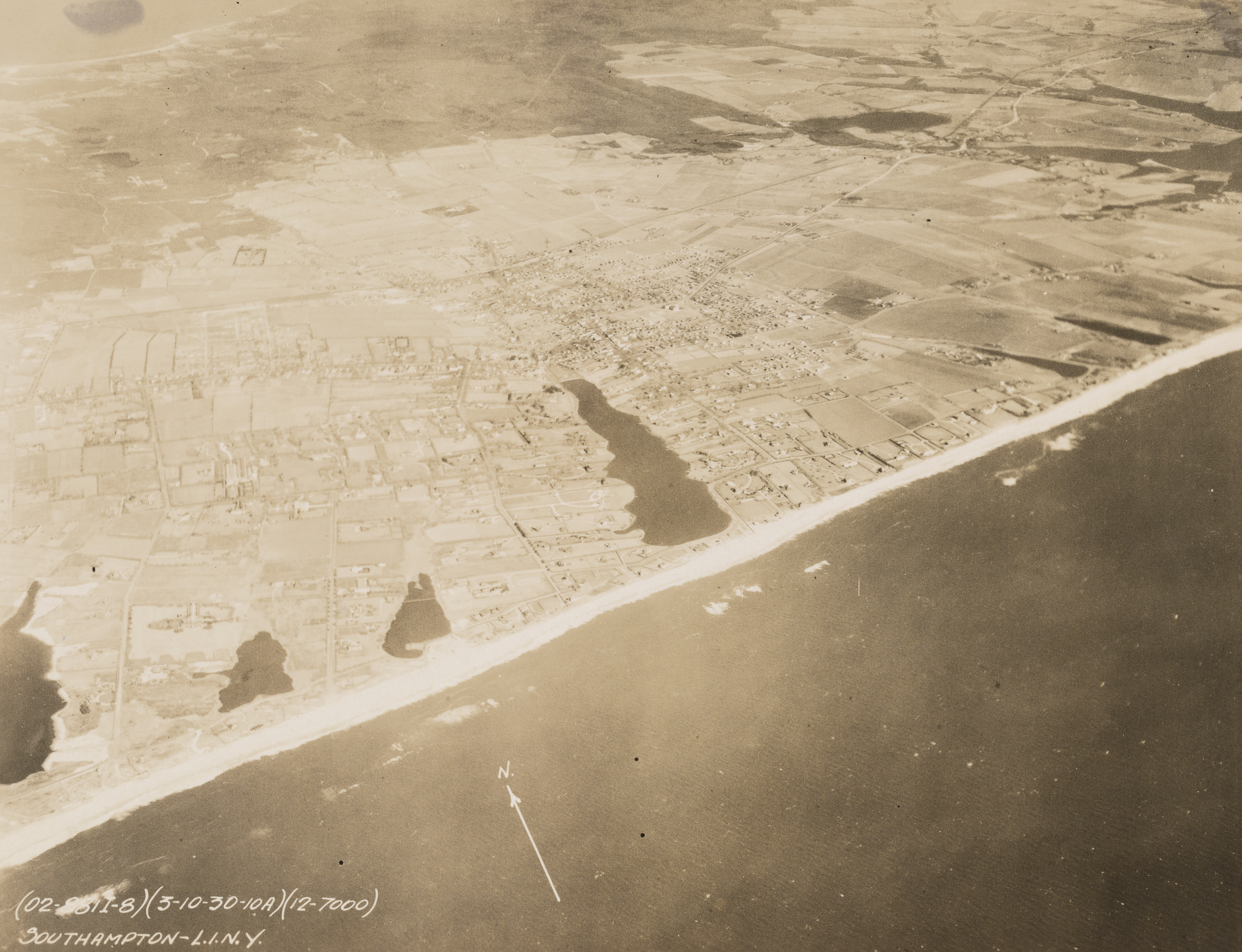
Southampton in 1930

The town was founded in 1640, when settlers from Lynn, Massachusetts, established residence on lands obtained from local Shinnecock Indian Nation. The first settlers included eight men, one woman, and a boy who came ashore at Conscience Point. These men were Thomas Halsey, Edward Howell, Edmond Farrington, Allen Bread, Edmund Needham, Abraham Pierson the Elder, Thomas Sayre, Josiah Stanborough, George Welbe, Henry Walton and Job Sayre. By July 7, 1640, they had determined the town boundaries. During the next few years (1640–43), Southampton gained another 43 families; there are now thousands of people in Southampton.

From 1644, the colonists established an organized whale fishery, significant in the history of whaling as the first in New England. They chased pilot whales ("blackfish") onto the shelving beaches for slaughter, a sort of dolphin drive hunting. They also processed drift whales they found on shore. They observed the Native Americans' hunting techniques, improved on their weapons and boats, and then went out to ocean hunting.

The first meeting house was on a hill that is the site of the current Southampton Hospital. The town's oldest existent house is the Halsey House at 249 Main Street, which was built by Thomas Halsey, one of the first Englishmen to trade with the Shinnecocks.

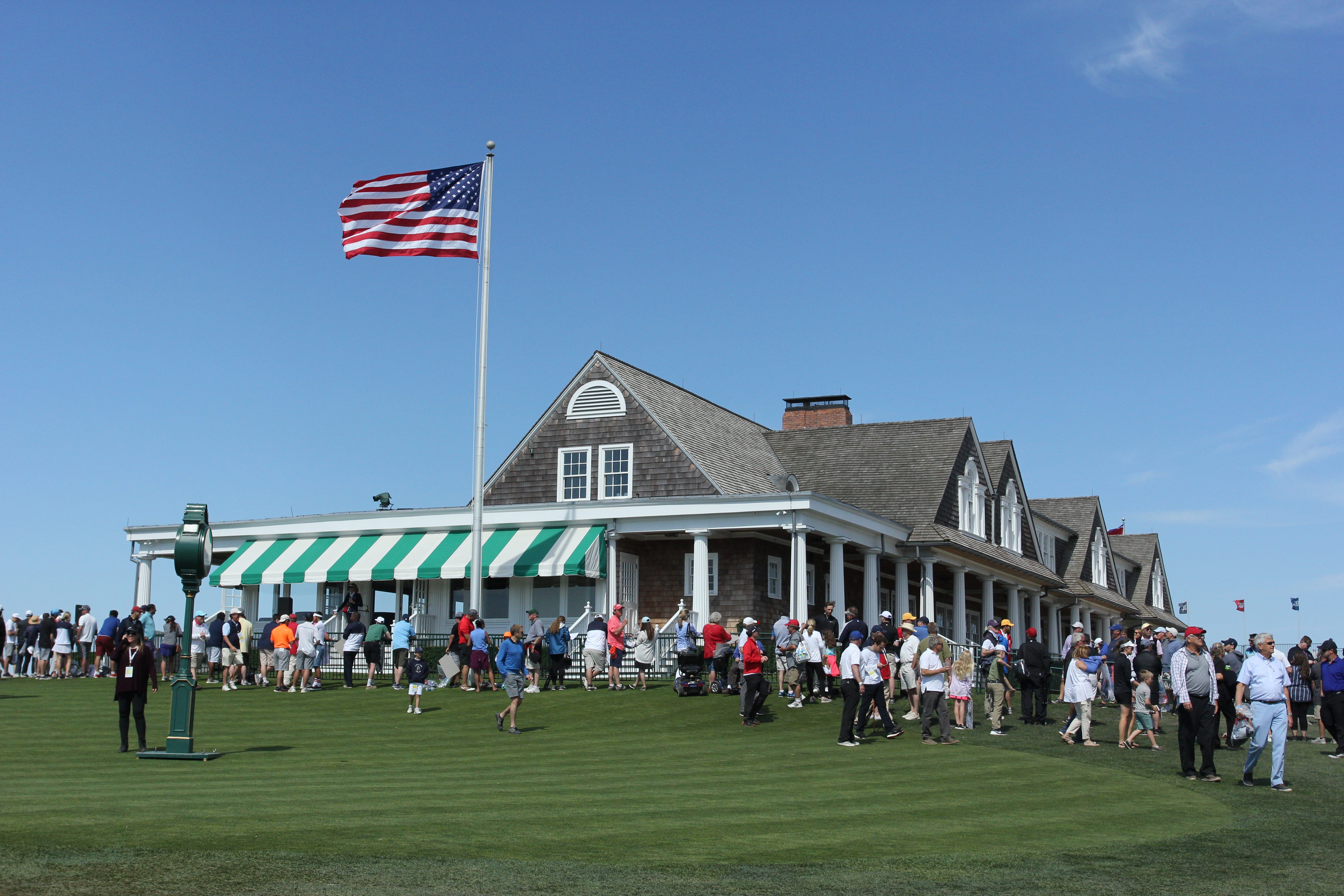
Shinnecock Hills Golf Club

Southampton has 47 public and private cemeteries, not including Shinnecock Hills Golf Club, which is claimed as an Indian burial ground that is no longer in active use. Southampton is named after the port city of Southampton in Hampshire, England.

Southampton operates an official historical web site. The site shows the locations of over 100 points of interest, historic markers, and historic districts as well as over 1500 photos.

=== Native American land claim ===
In 2005, the Shinnecock Indian Nation filed a lawsuit against the state seeking the return of 3,500 acres (14 km^{2}) in Southampton near the tribe's reservation, and billions of dollars in reparations for damages suffered by colonial land grabs. The disputed property includes the Shinnecock Hills Golf Club, which Shinnecock say is the location of tribe burial grounds. The tribe challenged the state legislatures' approval of an 1859 sale of the 3,500 acres of tribal land. The tribe alleged this broke the terms of a 1,000-year-lease signed by Southampton colonial officials and the tribe in 1703. The suit charged that in 1859, a group of powerful New York investors conspired to break the lease by sending the state Legislature a fraudulent petition from a number of Shinnecock tribal members. Although other tribal members immediately protested that the petition was a forgery, the legislature approved the sale of 3,500 acres (14 km^{2}) of tribal land. In 2006, the court ruled against the tribe finding the lawsuit was barred by laches.

== Geography ==
Southampton is bounded by the Atlantic Ocean to the south, the Peconic Bay to the north, East Hampton to the east, and Brookhaven to the west. It also shares a small border with Riverhead to the northwest.

According to the United States Census Bureau, the town has an area of 293.5 square miles (760 km^{2}), of which 139.1 square miles (360 km^{2}) is land and 154.3 square miles (400 km^{2}) (52.59%) is water.

Southampton contains seven incorporated villages and 16 unincorporated areas, which are called hamlets in New York state.

=== Villages (incorporated) ===
- North Haven
- Quogue
- Sag Harbor – east of Division Street is in the Town of East Hampton
- Sagaponack
- Southampton (village)
- Westhampton Beach
- West Hampton Dunes

=== Hamlets (unincorporated) ===
- Bridgehampton
- Eastport – partially, with the Town of Brookhaven
- East Quogue
- Flanders
- Hampton Bays
- Northampton
- North Sea
- Noyack – also spelled Noyac
- Quiogue
- Remsenburg – also see Remsenburg-Speonk
- Riverside
- Shinnecock Hills
- Speonk – also see Remsenburg-Speonk
- Tuckahoe
- Water Mill
- Westhampton

=== Climate ===
The Town of Southampton has a hot-summer humid continental climate (Dfa) bordering a humid subtropical climate (Cfa). It has one to two months averaging below freezing, six months above 50 °F (10 °C), and one to two months above 22 °C (72 °F).

Climate data for Bridgehampton, New York (1991–2020 normals, extremes 1930–present)
Month	Jan	Feb	Mar	Apr	May	Jun	Jul	Aug	Sep	Oct	Nov	Dec	Year
Record high °F (°C)	67 (19)	63 (17)	79 (26)	92 (33)	93 (34)	95 (35)	102 (39)	100 (38)	94 (34)	88 (31)	77 (25)	70 (21)	102 (39)
Mean maximum °F (°C)	56.3 (13.5)	54.5 (12.5)	63.6 (17.6)	72.7 (22.6)	82.1 (27.8)	88.4 (31.3)	92.1 (33.4)	89.6 (32.0)	84.4 (29.1)	76.3 (24.6)	66.5 (19.2)	60.1 (15.6)	93.7 (34.3)
Mean daily maximum °F (°C)	38.5 (3.6)	39.7 (4.3)	45.7 (7.6)	55.3 (12.9)	65.1 (18.4)	74.5 (23.6)	80.6 (27.0)	79.5 (26.4)	72.8 (22.7)	62.6 (17.0)	52.6 (11.4)	44.0 (6.7)	59.2 (15.1)
Daily mean °F (°C)	30.7 (−0.7)	31.6 (−0.2)	37.7 (3.2)	46.7 (8.2)	56.2 (13.4)	65.8 (18.8)	72.0 (22.2)	70.9 (21.6)	64.2 (17.9)	53.7 (12.1)	44.3 (6.8)	36.1 (2.3)	50.8 (10.4)
Mean daily minimum °F (°C)	23.0 (−5.0)	23.6 (−4.7)	29.7 (−1.3)	38.1 (3.4)	47.4 (8.6)	57.1 (13.9)	63.5 (17.5)	62.2 (16.8)	55.6 (13.1)	44.8 (7.1)	36.0 (2.2)	28.3 (−2.1)	42.4 (5.8)
Mean minimum °F (°C)	6.4 (−14.2)	9.5 (−12.5)	15.8 (−9.0)	26.7 (−2.9)	35.0 (1.7)	44.8 (7.1)	53.2 (11.8)	51.4 (10.8)	42.7 (5.9)	30.6 (−0.8)	21.6 (−5.8)	14.3 (−9.8)	4.7 (−15.2)
Record low °F (°C)	−11 (−24)	−12 (−24)	4 (−16)	14 (−10)	29 (−2)	36 (2)	45 (7)	41 (5)	35 (2)	22 (−6)	10 (−12)	−6 (−21)	−12 (−24)
Average precipitation inches (mm)	4.05 (103)	3.61 (92)	4.94 (125)	4.34 (110)	3.57 (91)	3.86 (98)	3.16 (80)	3.94 (100)	4.79 (122)	4.72 (120)	3.81 (97)	4.97 (126)	49.76 (1,264)
Average snowfall inches (cm)	7.2 (18)	8.6 (22)	6.0 (15)	0.8 (2.0)	0.0 (0.0)	0.0 (0.0)	0.0 (0.0)	0.0 (0.0)	0.0 (0.0)	0.0 (0.0)	0.1 (0.25)	4.1 (10)	26.8 (68)
Average extreme snow depth inches (cm)	3.9 (9.9)	5.3 (13)	3.4 (8.6)	0.5 (1.3)	0.0 (0.0)	0.0 (0.0)	0.0 (0.0)	0.0 (0.0)	0.0 (0.0)	0.0 (0.0)	0.0 (0.0)	2.6 (6.6)	8.1 (21)
Average precipitation days (≥ 0.01 in)	10.4	9.9	9.9	10.8	10.4	9.0	7.8	7.9	8.1	9.4	9.6	10.5	113.7
Average snowy days (≥ 0.1 in)	3.0	3.0	2.2	0.3	0.0	0.0	0.0	0.0	0.0	0.0	0.1	1.9	10.5
Source: NOAA

Climate data for Westhampton, New York (Francis S. Gabreski Airport), 1991–2020 normals, extremes 1951–present
Month	Jan	Feb	Mar	Apr	May	Jun	Jul	Aug	Sep	Oct	Nov	Dec	Year
Record high °F (°C)	67 (19)	71 (22)	76 (24)	88 (31)	93 (34)	96 (36)	100 (38)	99 (37)	94 (34)	88 (31)	80 (27)	71 (22)	100 (38)
Mean maximum °F (°C)	56.7 (13.7)	55.3 (12.9)	64.8 (18.2)	75.0 (23.9)	82.4 (28.0)	88.8 (31.6)	93.1 (33.9)	90.6 (32.6)	84.9 (29.4)	77.6 (25.3)	67.1 (19.5)	61.0 (16.1)	94.8 (34.9)
Mean daily maximum °F (°C)	38.7 (3.7)	40.4 (4.7)	46.8 (8.2)	56.6 (13.7)	66.2 (19.0)	75.4 (24.1)	81.3 (27.4)	80.3 (26.8)	73.6 (23.1)	63.4 (17.4)	53.3 (11.8)	44.5 (6.9)	60.0 (15.6)
Daily mean °F (°C)	29.4 (−1.4)	30.6 (−0.8)	37.2 (2.9)	46.1 (7.8)	55.9 (13.3)	65.6 (18.7)	71.9 (22.2)	70.8 (21.6)	63.7 (17.6)	52.9 (11.6)	43.5 (6.4)	35.2 (1.8)	50.2 (10.1)
Mean daily minimum °F (°C)	20.0 (−6.7)	20.9 (−6.2)	27.6 (−2.4)	35.6 (2.0)	45.6 (7.6)	55.8 (13.2)	62.5 (16.9)	61.4 (16.3)	53.9 (12.2)	42.5 (5.8)	33.7 (0.9)	25.8 (−3.4)	40.4 (4.7)
Mean minimum °F (°C)	−1.7 (−18.7)	2.8 (−16.2)	9.2 (−12.7)	20.3 (−6.5)	29.0 (−1.7)	39.6 (4.2)	49.5 (9.7)	47.6 (8.7)	38.0 (3.3)	25.7 (−3.5)	15.7 (−9.1)	8.1 (−13.3)	−3.4 (−19.7)
Record low °F (°C)	−15 (−26)	−12 (−24)	−9 (−23)	11 (−12)	24 (−4)	33 (1)	42 (6)	39 (4)	32 (0)	16 (−9)	6 (−14)	−1 (−18)	−15 (−26)
Average precipitation inches (mm)	3.19 (81)	2.72 (69)	4.28 (109)	3.79 (96)	3.31 (84)	3.50 (89)	2.88 (73)	3.74 (95)	3.75 (95)	4.65 (118)	3.48 (88)	4.17 (106)	43.46 (1,104)
Average snowfall inches (cm)	8.4 (21)	9.5 (24)	7.5 (19)	0.9 (2.3)	0.0 (0.0)	0.0 (0.0)	0.0 (0.0)	0.0 (0.0)	0.0 (0.0)	0.0 (0.0)	0.8 (2.0)	6.8 (17)	33.9 (85.3)
Average precipitation days (≥ 0.01 in)	10.5	10.1	10.7	11.9	13.6	11.1	9.5	9.7	10.2	12.0	10.5	11.0	130.8
Average snowy days (≥ 0.1 in)	4.6	4.5	3.7	0.4	0.0	0.0	0.0	0.0	0.0	0.0	0.3	3.4	16.9
Source: NOAA (mean maxima/minima 1998–2020, snow/snow days 1951–1969)

== Demographics ==
Historical population
Census	Pop.	Note	%±
1790	3,408		—
1800	3,670		7.7%
1810	3,899		6.2%
1820	4,229		8.5%
1830	4,850		14.7%
1840	6,205		27.9%
1850	6,501		4.8%
1860	6,803		4.6%
1870	6,135		−9.8%
1880	6,352		3.5%
1890	8,200		29.1%
1900	10,371		26.5%
1910	11,240		8.4%
1920	11,614		3.3%
1930	15,341		32.1%
1940	15,295		−0.3%
1950	16,830		10.0%
1960	27,095		61.0%
1970	36,154		33.4%
1980	42,849		18.5%
1990	44,976		5.0%
2000	54,713		21.6%
2010	56,790		3.8%
2020	69,036		21.6%
U.S. Decennial Census

As of the census of 2000, there were 54,712 people, 21,504 households and 13,805 families residing in the town. The population density was 394.0 inhabitants per square mile (152.1/km^{2}). There were 35,836 housing units at an average density of 258.0 per square mile (99.6/km^{2}). The town's racial makeup was 87.98% White, 6.62% Black or African American, 0.41% Native American, 0.89% Asian, 0.08% Pacific Islander, 2.28% from other races, and 1.73% from two or more races.

There were 21,504 households, of which 27.1% had children under the age of 18 living with them, 50.8% were married couples living together, 9.3% had a female householder with no husband present, and 35.8% were non-families. 28.6% of all households were made up of individuals, and 12.2% had someone living alone who was 65 years of age or older. The average household size was 2.45 and the average family size was 2.99.

In the town, the population was spread out, with 21.1% under the age of 18, 7.7% from 18 to 24, 28.5% from 25 to 44, 26.0% from 45 to 64, and 16.6% who were 65 years of age or older. The median age was 40 years. For every 100 females, there were 99.2 males. For every 100 females age 18 and over, there were 97.2 males. The town's median household income was $53,887, and the median family income was $65,144. Males had a median income of $47,167 versus $32,054 for females. The town's per capita income was $31,320. About 5.3% of families and 8.3% of the population were below the poverty line, including 10.2% of those under age 18 and 6.0% of those age 65 or over.

In 2016, according to Business Insider, the 11962 zip code encompassing Sagaponack, within Southampton, was listed as the most expensive in the U.S., with a median home sale price of $8.5 million.

== Economy ==
Major employers in Southampton include

Employer	Community
Southampton Hospital	Southampton
Stop & Shop	Southampton
Village of Southampton	Southampton
Southampton Union Free School District	Southampton
Meadow Club of Southampton	Southampton
Hardy Fuel	Shinnecock Hills
The Hamptons Center for Rehabilitation and Nursing	Southampton
Hampton Jitney	North Sea
Bathing Corporation of Southampton	Southampton

== Government ==
The town supervisor is Maria Z. Moore, a registered member of the Democratic Party, who was elected in November 2023 with 56.99% of the vote against Republican Cynthia Mc Namara.

== Media ==
=== Print ===
- The Southampton Press

=== Radio stations ===
- Bridgehampton - WBAZ (102.5 FM)
- Hampton Bays - WLIR (107.1 FM)
- Sag Harbor - WLNG (92.1 FM)
- Southampton - WHFM (95.3 FM), WLIW (88.3 FM), WRLI (91.3 FM)
- Westhampton - WBON (98.5 FM)

== Infrastructure ==
=== Transportation ===
==== Railroad lines ====
The Long Island Rail Road's sole line in the Town of Southampton is the Montauk Branch, which includes stations in Speonk, Westhampton, Hampton Bays, Southampton and Bridgehampton. Quogue and Southampton Campus also had their own stations until 1998.

==== Bus service ====
The Town of Southampton is served primarily by Suffolk County Transit bus routes, although Hampton Jitney buses are available for trips to and from New York City.

==== Major roads ====
- New York State Route 24
- New York State Route 27
- New York State Route 114
- County Route 38 (Suffolk County, New York)
- County Route 51 (Suffolk County, New York)
- County Route 79 (Suffolk County, New York)
- Montauk Highway, including County Route 80 (Suffolk County, New York)
- County Route 104 (Suffolk County, New York)
- County Route 105 (Suffolk County, New York)

==== Airports ====
The town of Southampton contains the Francis S. Gabreski Airport north of Westhampton, and East Hampton Airport along the Southampton-East Hampton Town Line. The Southampton Heliport can also be found on the east side of the Shinnecock Inlet.

==== Ferries ====
The sole ferry in the Town of Southampton takes NY 114 drivers across the Shelter Island Sound between North Haven and Shelter Island.

== Notable people ==
- Mickey Beyer Clausen, Danish born serial-entrepreneur and philanthropist
- Riley Biggs, American football player
- Tim Bishop, U.S. Representative
- Amanda Clark, Olympic sailor
- Mary L. Cleave, engineer and NASA astronaut
- Pyrrhus Concer, former slave
- Pamela Council, artist
- Scott Disick, reality television celebrity
- Michael J. Fox, actor
- Paul Gibson, Major League baseball pitcher
- Grenville Goodwin, anthropologist
- Nicoll Halsey, U.S. Representative
- George Rogers Howell, historian
- Andre Johnson, NFL football player
- John William Kilbreth, U.S. Army brigadier general
- Calvin Klein, fashion designer
- David Koch, billionaire
- Howard Lutnick, billionaire businessman
- Orson Desaix Munn II, publisher
- Jacqueline Bouvier Kennedy Onassis, First Lady of the United States (1961–63)
- Hope Reese, journalist and nonfiction author
- Jean Shafiroff, philanthropist and socialite
- Howard Stein, financier
- Howard Stern, radio host
- Carlos Eduardo Stolk, business magnate
- Carole Terry, musician
- Foots Walker, NBA basketball player
- P. G. Wodehouse, writer
- Zach Erdem, restaurateur and reality television celebrity
- Carl Yastrzemski, Hall of Fame Major League baseball player

== See also ==
- Basilica of the Sacred Hearts of Jesus and Mary (Southampton, New York)
- National Register of Historic Places listings in Southampton (town), New York
