= George Stavropoulos =

American fashion designer

George Peter Stavropoulos (1920–1990) was a New York fashion designer best known for his innovatively draped silk chiffon dresses and evening gowns that seemed to float in air. Many of his designs were influenced by the grace of classic Greek sculpture. He was couturier to celebrities such as Jacqueline Kennedy Onassis, Elizabeth Taylor, Barbra Streisand, Maria Callas, Renata Tebaldi and Lady Bird Johnson, and also to a loyal coterie of New York society women some of whom bought his clothes from his first collection in 1960 to his last thirty years later. This gave Stavropoulos a discreet social cachet. In Palm Beach, Florida, people said that the yearly November arrival of Stavropoulos with his new collection was a signal that the social season had started. And if Stavropoulos showed up at a party, his attendance might be chronicled by such gossip columnists as Cindy Adams.

== Biography ==
Born in Tripoli, Greece, he showed a talent for design as a teenager. In 1949, he opened a boutique in Athens selling his designs. In 1952, Christian Dior invited him to work with him in Paris; he declined. After marrying an American, he moved to New York and set up shop there in 1961. He was soon discovered by Lady Bird Johnson, who as first lady invited him to White House galas and wore his gowns to state dinners.

His gowns were made almost entirely by hand in his own atelier on Fifty-Seventh Street. Their quality and workmanship rivaled that of Parisian Haute Couture. They were expensive, selling for up to $7500 in the late 1980s. But Stavropoulos ignored fashion trends and women buying one of his gowns knew that it would never go out of style.

Stavropoulos was the 7th of 10 children. His parents were Panagiotis Dimitris Stavropoulos and Dimitra Stavropoulos (nee Paraskevopoulou). He was born on January 22, 1920, in Tripolis Greece. His father was a merchant and also was the first industrialist in Greece to have a cigarette factory. Ironically, lung cancer killed Stavropoulos in 1990, having been a smoker most of his life. Cancer also killed all of his brothers, all of whom smoked as well. When Stavropoulos was about 7 or 8 years of age, the family moved from Tripolis to Athens. The Great Depression, World War II and the Greek Civil War left the family and the country in poor financial condition. Stavropoulos took his father's top hats and made shoes for his siblings. He was gifted in the arts and made dresses for his sisters that proved to be quite popular.

He started his career sweeping a tailor shop in order to provide money for his family, and that is where he learned how to sew. His father died of a heart attack during WWII in 1945. His sisters' friends were interested in having clothes made and approached the young designer with orders. He then decided to strike out on his own. He learned draping by studying Ancient Greek sculpture.

In 1957 he met his wife, Nancy Stavropoulos (nee Angelakos) on a blind date in Athens. She was a US State Department employee stationed in Athens. Mrs. Stavropoulos was a Greek-American native of New Jersey who had been recruited by the US Government because she was a native speaker. The night they met was her second night in Athens. He fell madly in love and proposed a week later, while she thought he was crazy. She would not marry him unless he emigrated to the United States. He eventually agreed and the couple were married on October 31, 1960. They moved to the US in early 1961, settling in Somerville NJ with her parents. They soon moved to an apartment on 30th Street in New York City, and he started his business. Notably, he had been approached by a group of French business men in the 1950s to move to Paris and start a fashion house there, but Nancy wanted to be in New York. The business men eventually settled for Yves Saint Laurent.

On February 9, 1965, Nancy gave birth to a son, Peter G. Stavropoulos. Stavropoulos in the same year was "discovered" by Mildred Custin, the Anna Wintour of the 1960s, and his clothes were featured in the windows of Bonwitt Teller on 5th Avenue and 56th Street; the lot is now occupied by Trump Tower. His clothes could be found in stores that included Bonwitt Teller, Bergdorf Goodman, Neiman Marcus, Maison Blanche, Sarah Frederick's, Kleinfeld's, and Martha's.

He died on December 8, 1990, and was survived by his wife Nancy and his son Peter. His legacy continues with his archives being housed at the Fashion School at Kent State University. Many of his works are also held at the Metropolitain Museum in New York City, The Fashion Institute of Technology (FIT) in New York, The Benaki Museum in Athens, and the Smithsonian Institution. He has a grandson named after him, the son of Peter and his wife Cally.
