= Bridgehampton, New York =

- Hamlet and census-designated place
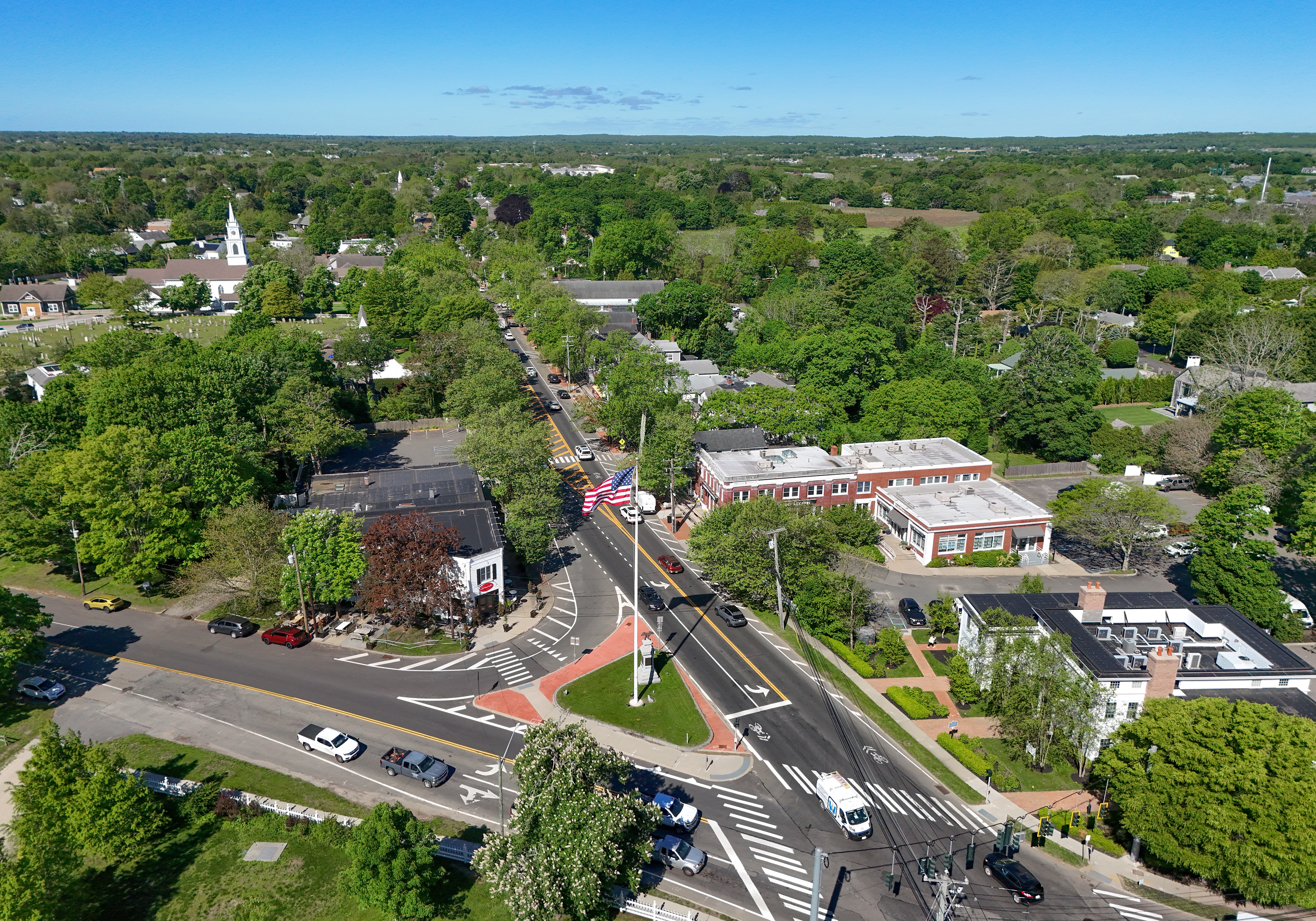
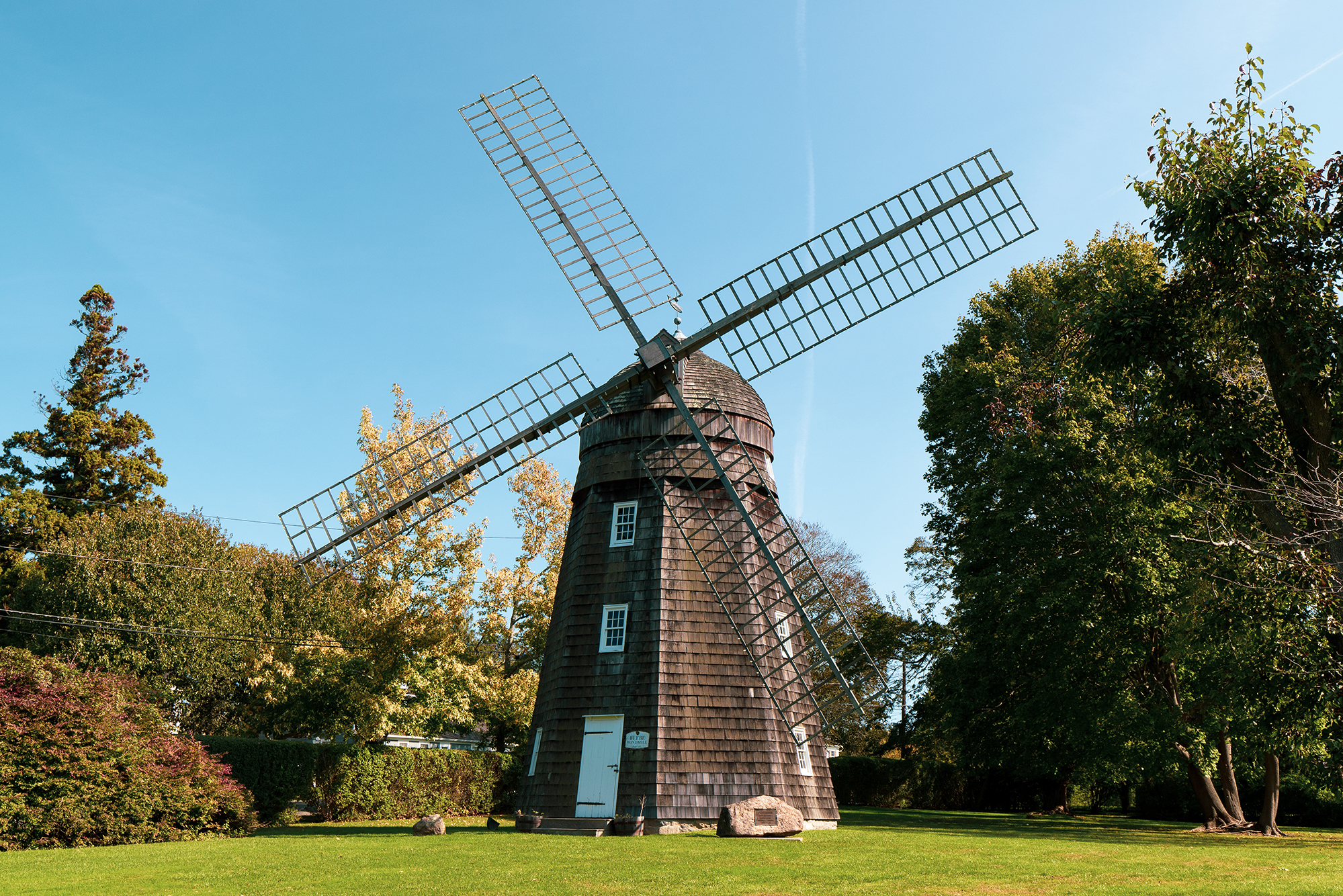
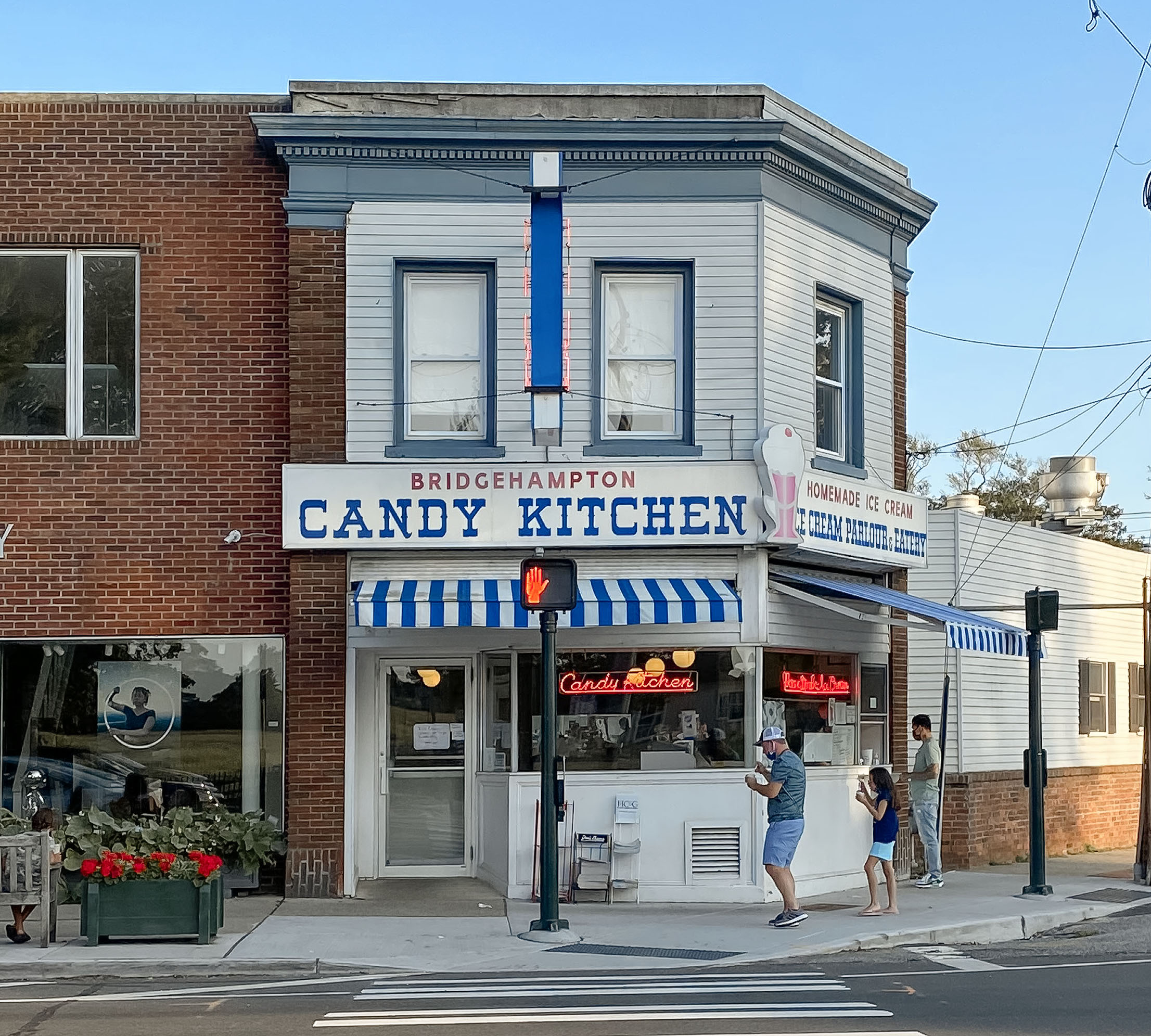
- Downtown Bridgehampton Beebe Windmill Candy Kitchen

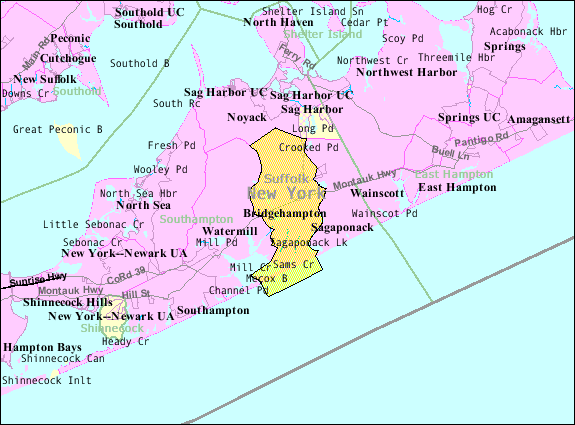
- U.S. Census map of Bridgehampton

- Location on Long Island Location within the state of New York
- Coordinates: 40°55′59″N 72°18′29″W
- Country: United States
- State: New York (state)
- County: Suffolk
- Town: Southampton

Area
  - Total: 14.87 sq mi (38.52 km^{2})
  - Land: 13.01 sq mi (33.70 km^{2})
  - Water: 1.86 sq mi (4.82 km^{2})
- Elevation: 43 ft (13 m)

Population (2020)
  - Total: 2,953
  - Density: 227.0/sq mi (87.64/km^{2})
- Time zone: UTC−5 (Eastern (EST))
  - Summer (DST): UTC−4 (EDT)
- ZIP Code: 11932
- Area codes: 631, 934
- FIPS code: 36-08136
- GNIS feature ID: 0944725

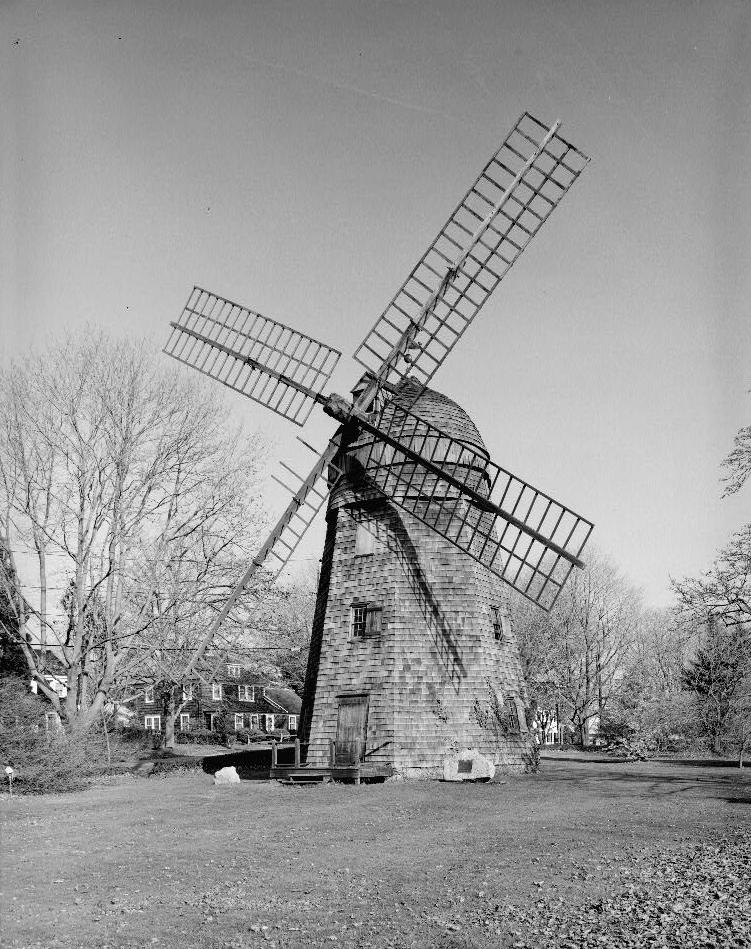
Beebe windmill, moved from Sag Harbor to Bridgehampton in the 19th century

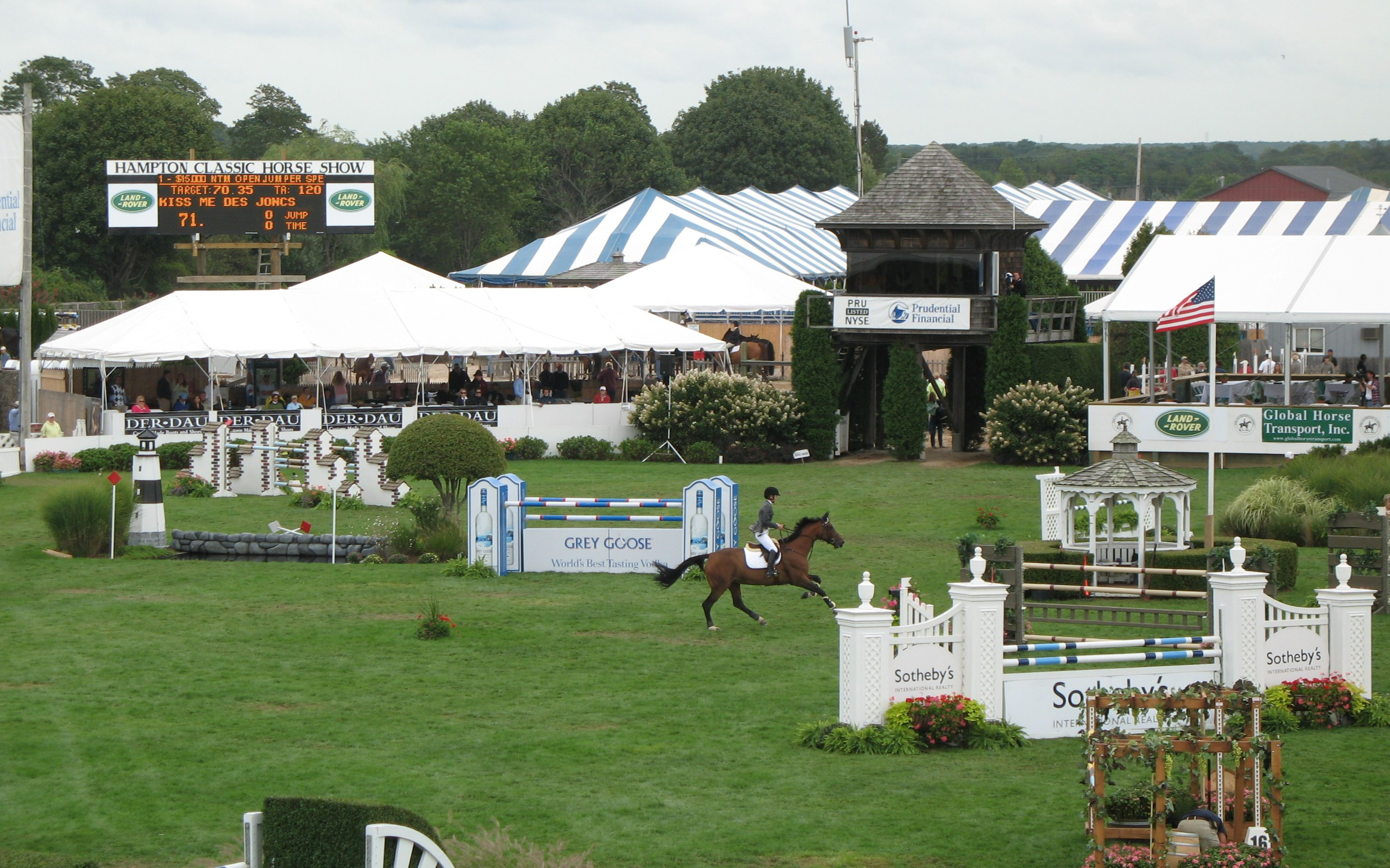
Hampton Classic

Bridgehampton is a hamlet and census-designated place (CDP) located within the Town of Southampton on the South Fork of Suffolk County, on Long Island, in New York, United States. The population was 2,953 at the time of the 2020 census.

== History ==
Shortly after the founding of Southampton in 1640, settlers began to move east to the area known by the Shinnecock Indians as Sagaponack and Mecox. At the head of Sagg Pond, the settlers established a community called Bullhead, later renamed Bridgehampton—after the bridge built across the pond. Sagg Bridge was built in 1686 by Ezekiel Sandford. The bridge was the link between Mecox and Sagaponack and gave this locality its name of Bridgehampton. The notorious criminal and memoirist Stephen Burroughs lived in the community during the 18th century and helped found the town's first library in 1793; the volumes he purchased could be found in the Bridgehampton Public Library as late as 2002.

Bridgehampton became the home of the horse show known as the Hampton Classic and a road racing course that figured prominently in American automobile racing. It was also home to the last full size Kmart store in the mainland United States, however, it closed on October 20, 2024.

== Demographics ==
=== 2020 census ===
As of the 2020 census, Bridgehampton had a population of 2,953. The median age was 47.2 years. 20.2% of residents were under the age of 18 and 23.7% of residents were 65 years of age or older. For every 100 females there were 98.6 males, and for every 100 females age 18 and over there were 100.3 males age 18 and over.

68.6% of residents lived in urban areas, while 31.4% lived in rural areas.

There were 1,136 households in Bridgehampton, of which 24.5% had children under the age of 18 living in them. Of all households, 50.5% were married-couple households, 17.1% were households with a male householder and no spouse or partner present, and 27.0% were households with a female householder and no spouse or partner present. About 26.7% of all households were made up of individuals and 14.6% had someone living alone who was 65 years of age or older.

There were 2,632 housing units, of which 56.8% were vacant. The homeowner vacancy rate was 5.4% and the rental vacancy rate was 35.9%.

Racial composition as of the 2020 census
Race	Number	Percent
White	2,229	75.5%
Black or African American	202	6.8%
American Indian and Alaska Native	22	0.7%
Asian	72	2.4%
Native Hawaiian and Other Pacific Islander	0	0.0%
Some other race	195	6.6%
Two or more races	233	7.9%
Hispanic or Latino (of any race)	417	14.1%

=== 2000 census ===
As of the census of 2000, there were 1,381 people, 627 households, and 369 families residing in the CDP. The population density was 147.8 inhabitants per square mile (57.1/km^{2}). There were 1,494 housing units at an average density of 159.9 per square mile (61.7/km^{2}). The racial makeup of the CDP was 78.86% White, 17.38% African American, 0.51% Native American, 0.80% Asian, 1.45% from other races, and 1.01% from two or more races. Hispanic or Latino of any race were 3.26% of the population.

There were 627 households, out of which 19.6% had children under the age of 18 living with them, 47.0% were married couples living together, 7.5% had a female householder with no husband present, and 41.1% were non-families. Of all households 33.0% were made up of individuals, and 12.9% had someone living alone who was 65 years of age or older. The average household size was 2.20 and the average family size was 2.82.

In the CDP, the population was spread out, with 17.7% under the age of 18, 4.1% from 18 to 24, 22.2% from 25 to 44, 33.2% from 45 to 64, and 22.9% who were 65 years of age or older. The median age was 49 years. For every 100 females, there were 95.3 males. For every 100 females age 18 and over, there were 94.0 males.

The median income for a household in the CDP was $54,896, and the median income for a family was $74,583. Males had a median income of $50,865 versus $32,778 for females. The per capita income for the CDP was $43,781. About 6.8% of families and 8.5% of the population were below the poverty line, including 19.2% of those under age 18 and 2.7% of those age 65 or over.

== Geography ==
According to the United States Census Bureau, the CDP has a total area of 13.6 square miles (35.3 km^{2}), of which 13.0 square miles (33.7 km^{2}) is land and 0.62 square miles (1.6 km^{2}), or 4.57%, is water.

=== Climate ===
Bridgehampton has a climate transitioning between humid continental, subtropical and maritime. Due to the cold winter lows, plant hardiness more resembles a continental environment in spite of its oceanside location.

Climate data for Bridgehampton, New York (1991–2020 normals, extremes 1930–present)
Month	Jan	Feb	Mar	Apr	May	Jun	Jul	Aug	Sep	Oct	Nov	Dec	Year
Record high °F (°C)	67 (19)	63 (17)	79 (26)	92 (33)	93 (34)	95 (35)	102 (39)	100 (38)	94 (34)	88 (31)	77 (25)	70 (21)	102 (39)
Mean maximum °F (°C)	56.3 (13.5)	54.5 (12.5)	63.6 (17.6)	72.7 (22.6)	82.1 (27.8)	88.4 (31.3)	92.1 (33.4)	89.6 (32.0)	84.4 (29.1)	76.3 (24.6)	66.5 (19.2)	60.1 (15.6)	93.7 (34.3)
Mean daily maximum °F (°C)	38.5 (3.6)	39.7 (4.3)	45.7 (7.6)	55.3 (12.9)	65.1 (18.4)	74.5 (23.6)	80.6 (27.0)	79.5 (26.4)	72.8 (22.7)	62.6 (17.0)	52.6 (11.4)	44.0 (6.7)	59.2 (15.1)
Daily mean °F (°C)	30.7 (−0.7)	31.6 (−0.2)	37.7 (3.2)	46.7 (8.2)	56.2 (13.4)	65.8 (18.8)	72.0 (22.2)	70.9 (21.6)	64.2 (17.9)	53.7 (12.1)	44.3 (6.8)	36.1 (2.3)	50.8 (10.4)
Mean daily minimum °F (°C)	23.0 (−5.0)	23.6 (−4.7)	29.7 (−1.3)	38.1 (3.4)	47.4 (8.6)	57.1 (13.9)	63.5 (17.5)	62.2 (16.8)	55.6 (13.1)	44.8 (7.1)	36.0 (2.2)	28.3 (−2.1)	42.4 (5.8)
Mean minimum °F (°C)	6.4 (−14.2)	9.5 (−12.5)	15.8 (−9.0)	26.7 (−2.9)	35.0 (1.7)	44.8 (7.1)	53.2 (11.8)	51.4 (10.8)	42.7 (5.9)	30.6 (−0.8)	21.6 (−5.8)	14.3 (−9.8)	4.7 (−15.2)
Record low °F (°C)	−11 (−24)	−12 (−24)	4 (−16)	14 (−10)	29 (−2)	36 (2)	45 (7)	41 (5)	35 (2)	22 (−6)	10 (−12)	−6 (−21)	−12 (−24)
Average precipitation inches (mm)	4.05 (103)	3.61 (92)	4.94 (125)	4.34 (110)	3.57 (91)	3.86 (98)	3.16 (80)	3.94 (100)	4.79 (122)	4.72 (120)	3.81 (97)	4.97 (126)	49.76 (1,264)
Average snowfall inches (cm)	7.2 (18)	8.6 (22)	6.0 (15)	0.8 (2.0)	0.0 (0.0)	0.0 (0.0)	0.0 (0.0)	0.0 (0.0)	0.0 (0.0)	0.0 (0.0)	0.1 (0.25)	4.1 (10)	26.8 (68)
Average extreme snow depth inches (cm)	3.9 (9.9)	5.3 (13)	3.4 (8.6)	0.5 (1.3)	0.0 (0.0)	0.0 (0.0)	0.0 (0.0)	0.0 (0.0)	0.0 (0.0)	0.0 (0.0)	0.0 (0.0)	2.6 (6.6)	8.1 (21)
Average precipitation days (≥ 0.01 in)	10.4	9.9	9.9	10.8	10.4	9.0	7.8	7.9	8.1	9.4	9.6	10.5	113.7
Average snowy days (≥ 0.1 in)	3.0	3.0	2.2	0.3	0.0	0.0	0.0	0.0	0.0	0.0	0.1	1.9	10.5
Source: NOAA

== Education ==
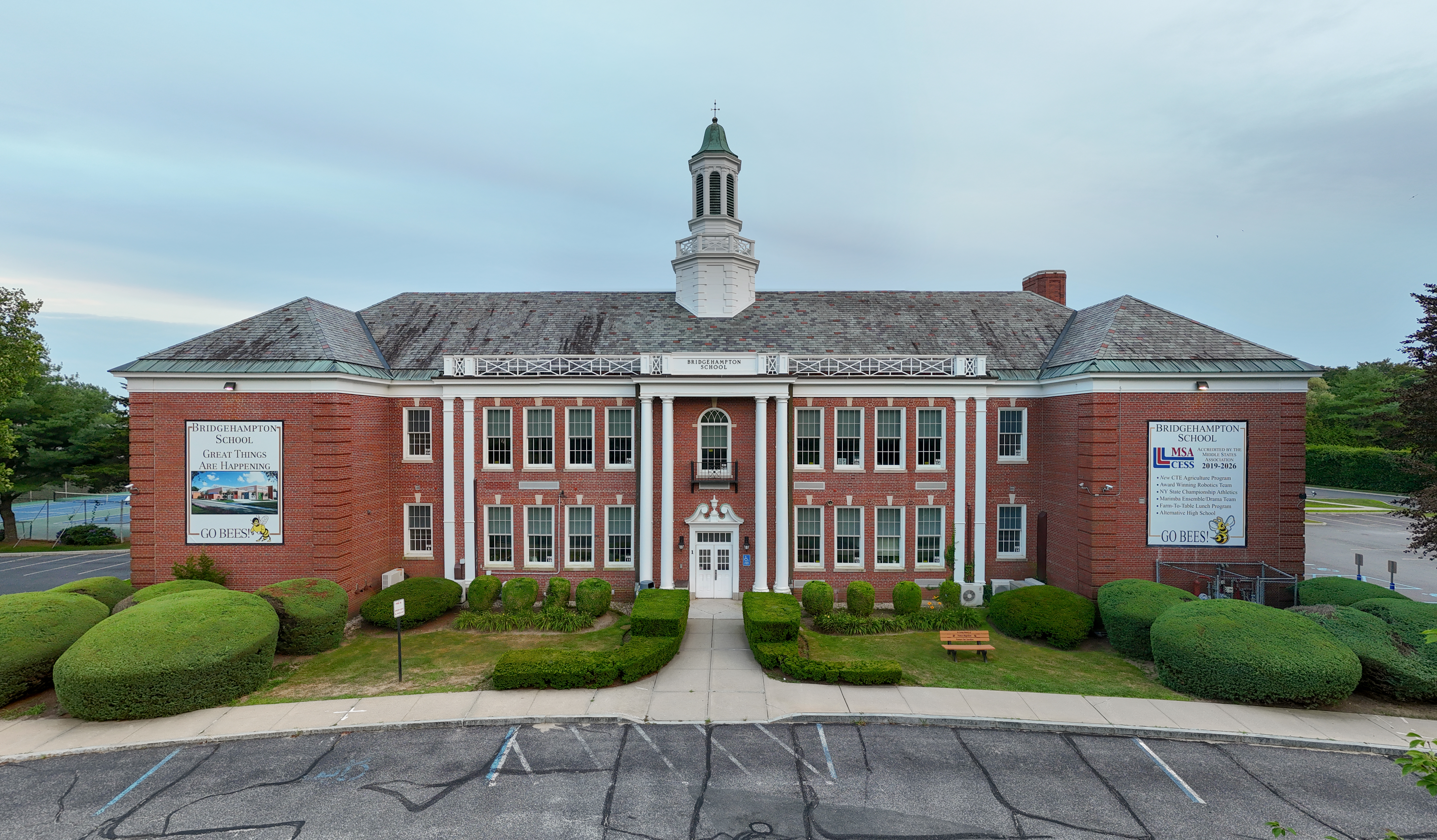
Bridgehampton School, built in 1930 on Montauk Highway

The Bridgehampton Union Free School District operates one school, the Bridgehampton School, serving grades K through 12. The private Hayground School is also located in the hamlet.

== Race circuit ==
The Bridgehampton Race Circuit was a 2.85-mile (4.59 km), thirteen-turn road course located near Sag Harbor. The historic road racing track has been converted to a golf course and homes.

== Notable people ==
- Lloyd Blankfein, business executive
- James M. Halsey, farmer, merchant and politician
- Mary Heilmann, painter
- Henry E. Huntting, whaler, farmer, and member of the New York State Assembly
- Sean Ludwick, real estate developer convicted of vehicular homicide
- A. J. Pierzynski, baseball player
- Carl Quintanilla, CNBC presenter
- Ernestine Rose, born and raised in Bridgehampton, was a librarian at the New York Public Library responsible for the purchase and incorporation of the Arthur A. Schomburg collection.
- Isaac Sandford, Brigadier General
- Carl Yastrzemski, Boston Red Sox, 1967 Triple Crown winner, born and raised in Bridgehampton

== See also ==
- Bridgehampton Polo Club
- Dia Bridgehampton

Preceded by Sagaponack	The Hamptons	Succeeded by Southampton
