= New York State Route 114 =

Highway on Long Island, New York

New York State Route 114
- Map of eastern Long Island with NY 114 highlighted in red

Route information
- Maintained by NYSDOT and the village of Greenport
- Length: 15.69 mi (25.25 km)
- Existed: 1930–present

Major junctions
- South end: NY 27 in East Hampton
- North end: NY 25 in Greenport

Location
- Country: United States
- State: New York
- Counties: Suffolk

Highway system
- New York Highways; Interstate; US; State; Reference; Parkways
← NY 113	→ NY 115

New York State Route 114 (NY 114) is a state highway, including two ferry crossings, on the far eastern sections of Long Island in New York in the United States. It serves as a connector between the two "forks" of Long Island, crossing Shelter Island in the process. This is the only connection between the North and South forks east of Riverhead. NY 114 is the easternmost signed north–south state route in all of New York. Additionally, the route is the last in a series of sequential state routes on Long Island. The series begins with NY 101 in western Nassau County and progresses eastward to NY 114.

NY 114 was assigned in the 1930 renumbering of state highways in New York and has remained intact since. The highway has had two proposed spurs by Suffolk County that were failed to be constructed. NYSDOT has also marked most of the road as New York State Bicycle Route 114 (NY Bike Route 114) with diversions onto local streets in Sag Harbor, and north and west of the northern terminus along NY 25 in Greenport.

== Route description ==
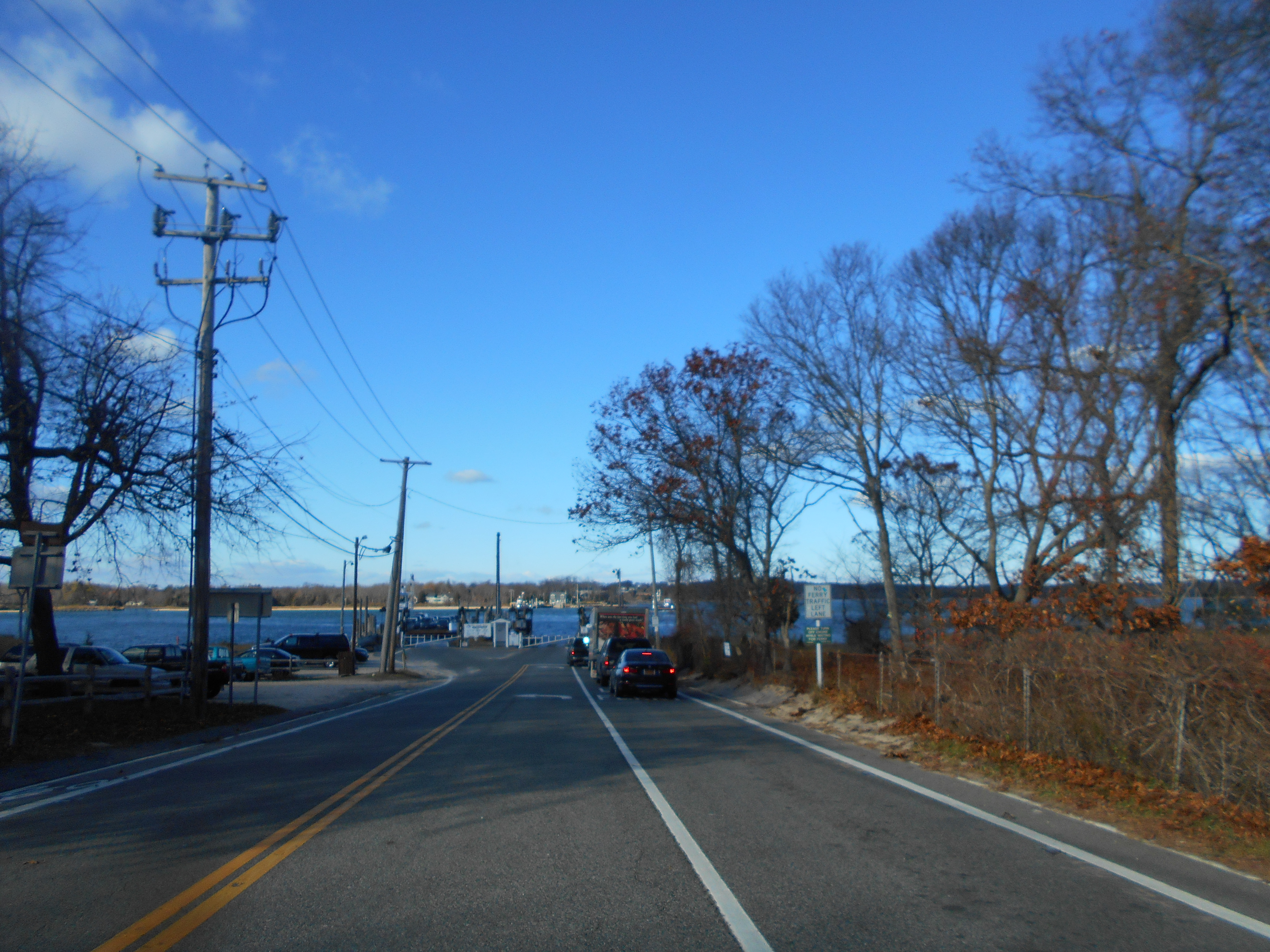
NY 114 northbound approaching the southern ferry terminal in North Haven.

The southern end of NY 114 is at a four-way intersection with NY 27 (Main Street), just west of the downtown area of East Hampton. Southeast of the intersection, the road continues east as Dunemere Lane, which leads to the Maidstone Club. The road proceeds north as Buell Lane for 0.6 miles (0.97 km) before reaching "Five Corners", a complex intersection that was converted to a traffic circle in October 2018.

Following the roundabout, NY 114 quickly relinquishes its status as a local road and becomes a two-lane rural highway with a 45 miles per hour (72 km/h) speed limit known as the East Hampton–Sag Harbor Turnpike. The wooded landscape between these two resort towns is dotted with large manors and estates, many of which are set far back from the roadway. The road has two main intersections along this rural stretch, a signalized intersection with Stephen Hands Path (unsigned CR 113), which services the Northwest Harbor area, and Wainscott Northwest Road, which leads to the East Hampton Airport and the community of Wainscott.

After several miles, NY 114 finds itself in the village of Sag Harbor. This colonial whaling port is today a village of boutiques and shops along the waterfront of Sag Harbor Bay, an arm of Peconic Bay. NY 114 makes several turns as it navigates the village's centuries-old street pattern. Just before crossing the Sag Harbor Cove, the road meets the northern terminus of the village's Main Street, an extension of County Route 79 which leads south to Bridgehampton.

After leaving Sag Harbor, NY 114 encounters a modern roundabout at the intersection of Short Beach Road (County Route 60 or CR 60) and Tyndall Road. NY 114 makes a turn through the roundabout and then travels one more mile through North Haven before reaching the first of two ferries along its route. Shelter Island's two ferries, both of which technically carry NY 114, are operated by two different companies. The South Ferry (between North Haven and Shelter Island) and the North Ferry (between Shelter Island Heights and Greenport) are privately owned and were founded in 1830 and the 1850s, respectively.

On Shelter Island itself, NY 114 acts as the main thoroughfare, once again turning along different local roads. It traverses the length of the island and ends in historic Shelter Island Heights at the North Ferry terminal. Once across to Greenport, NY 114 ends quickly at NY 25, again just a block or so from the heart of the village. Despite the short distance between the North Ferry terminal and the northern terminus, NY 114 includes three streets in Greenport. Northbound Route 114 runs on Third Street from the ferry terminal to NY 25. Southbound NY 114 runs along Fifth Street then one block later turns left onto Wiggins Street, where it heads eastbound until it passes the historic Greenport Railroad Station, and terminates at Third Street and the North Ferry terminal. The portion of NY 114 within Greenport is maintained by the village.

== History ==
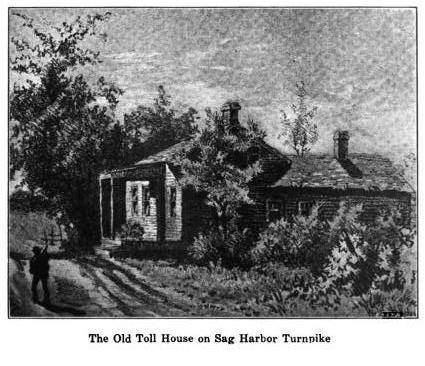
Old toll house on the Sag Harbor Turnpike (NY 114) in Southampton, which burned in 1909

In 1840 the Bull Head Turnpike Company built a private toll road known today as the Sag Harbor Turnpike, which operated successfully until a competing railroad line opened in the 1880s. In 1906 the town of Southampton took control of the now dilapidated road and removed the toll gates. NY 114 was assigned to its current alignment as part of the 1930 renumbering of state highways in New York and is known in part as the Sag Harbor Turnpike. The bridge carrying NY 114 between Sag Harbor and North Haven is an arched bridge that serves as a village landmark. In 1999, residents successfully fought state proposals to replace it with a girder bridge. Instead, the bridge was replaced with a new, wider bridge with ornamental lamps that closely resembles the original and is in the same location.

Suffolk County once had plans to upgrade CR 59 (Long Lane) into a four-lane highway bypassing East Hampton to the north.

Another formerly proposed Suffolk County built realignment was the North Haven Spur (CR 44), which was planned for a future bridge to Shelter Island.

In October 2018, the village of East Hampton completed the construction of a new $1.6-million roundabout at the intersection of NY 114 (Buell Lane), Buell Lane Extension, and Toilsome Lane. The complex five-way intersection had 23 vehicle collisions reported to the local police from 2003 to 2008, and upgrades has been proposed since 2009. The improvement was jointly funded by NYSDOT and the village of East Hampton.

The NYSDOT has set aside $13.1 million to repave the 8-mile (13 km) section of NY 114 between Stephen Hands Path in East Hampton and the South Ferry in North Haven. The project is in planning stages and is scheduled to take place in 2021.

== Major intersections ==
The entire route is in Suffolk County.

Location	mi	km	Destinations	Notes
Village of East Hampton	0.00	0.00	NY 27 (Main Street) / Dunemere Lane – Southampton, Montauk Point	Southern terminus; no access from Dunemere Lane
Village of East Hampton	0.59	0.95	Toilsome Lane	"Five Corners" intersection, converted to traffic circle in 2018
Sag Harbor Bay	6.85	11.02	Jordan Haerter Veterans Memorial Bridge	
Shelter Island Sound	9.90– 10.26	15.93– 16.51	South Ferry (North Haven–Shelter Island)	
Shelter Island Heights	14.16	22.79	Cedar Avenue / Chase Avenue	Southern terminus of one-way pair
Shelter Island Heights	14.47	23.29	Summerfield Place	Northern terminus of one-way pair
Shelter Island Sound	14.61– 15.51	23.51– 24.96	North Ferry (Shelter Island Heights–Greenport)	
Greenport	15.69	25.25	NY 25 (Front Street)	Northern terminus
1.000 mi = 1.609 km; 1.000 km = 0.621 mi: Incomplete access
