= North Ferry =

Coordinates: 41°5′13.4″N 72°21′27.4″W

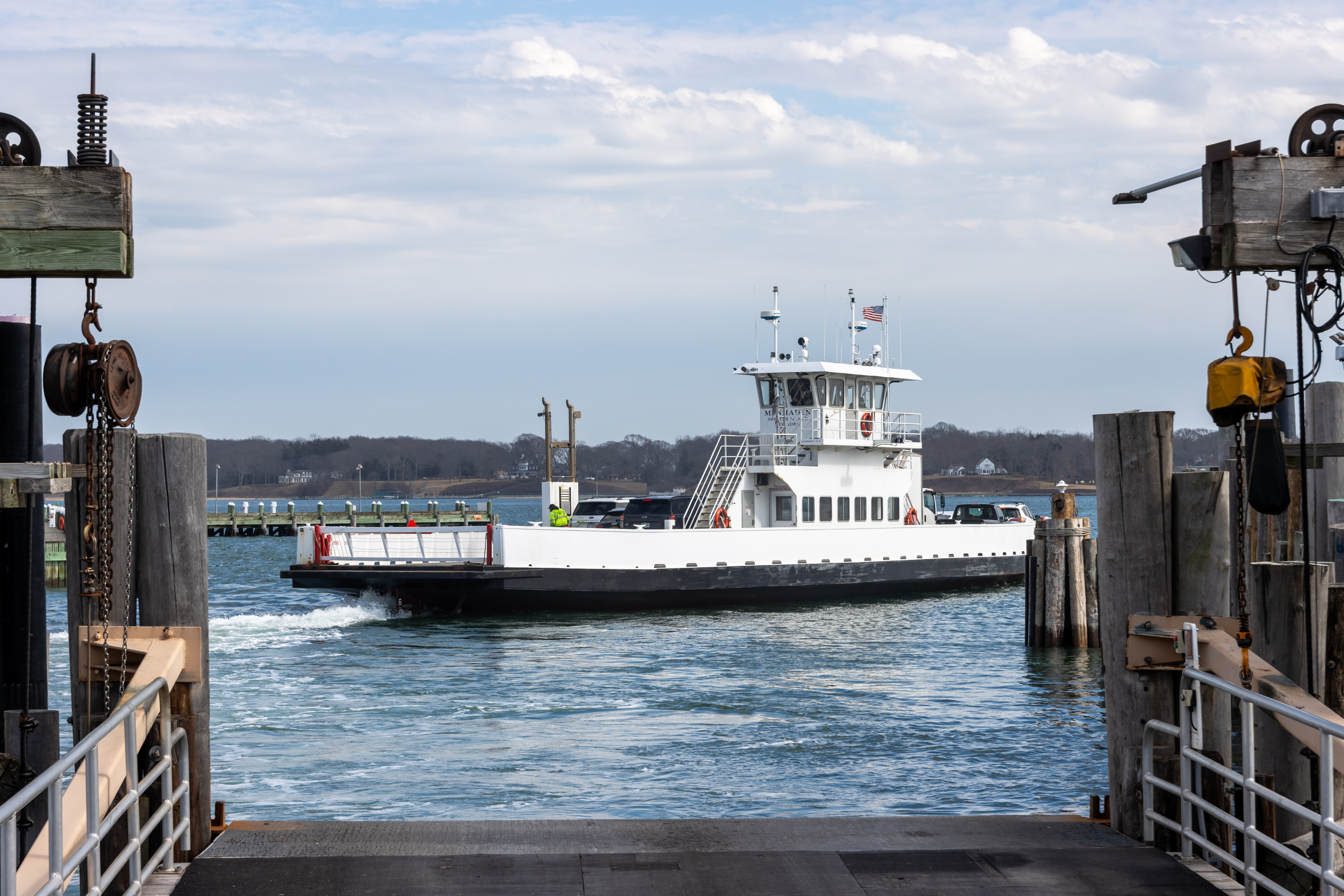
- The ferry Menhaden departs Greenport in 2025
- Locale: Suffolk County, New York
- Waterway: Shelter Island Sound
- Owner: North Ferry Co.
- Began operation: 1850s
- Website: northferry.com

The North Ferry is a ferry service that links Shelter Island, New York, with Greenport, New York. With the South Ferry service, it forms part of New York State Route 114 and provides a link between the North and South Forks of Long Island.

== Operations ==
As of 2025 the North Ferry operates daily between Shelter Island, New York, and Greenport, New York. During the day, service is on a 10–20 minute headway. During nominal operation, the company typically targets clock-face scheduling with departures at 15-minute intervals.

== History ==
Shelter Island sits between the North and South Forks of Long Island, surrounded by Shelter Island Sound. Regular ferry service between Shelter Island and the South Fork may have begun as early as 1793. Jonathan Preston, an English immigrant, established the first regular service between Shelter Island and the North Fork in the 1850s. The state of New York granted him a charter in 1859. Preston sold the service to Charles Costa in 1863. Costa operated it for two years before selling it to Samuel Clark and Charles Harlow. They, in turn, sold it to Benjamin H. Sisson in 1869. Sisson sold it in 1871 to the Shelter Island Grove and Camp Meeting Association of the Methodist Episcopal Church.

The Association was formed by a group of men from Brooklyn, New York, seeking a site for camp meetings. They led the development of the Shelter Heights area, and many of the buildings they built are now part of the Shelter Island Heights Historic District. The Association reformed as a property development group in 1886. They incorporated the Greenport and Shelter Island Ferry Company in 1883 to manage the ferry to the North Fork.

In 1958, the company moved its ferry slip in Greenport from Main Street to Third Street, adjacent to the Greenport station of the Long Island Rail Road. This move was prompted by traffic congestion during the summer season. In the late 1970s the company opposed plans by the Mascony Ferry and Transport Service to implement a new direct ferry service between Greenport and New London, Connecticut, bypassing the Cross Sound Ferry ferry at Orient Point. Also opposing the new service was Cross Sound Ferry, Amtrak, and Greenport itself. The current North Ferry Co. succeeded the Greenport and Shelter Island Ferry Company in 1979. The Shelter Island Heights Property Owners Association, successor to the original Shelter Island Grove and Camp Meeting Association, continues to own the ferry company.

== List of boats ==
Vessel name	Delivered
Mashomack	2002
Menantic	2005
Manhansett	2007

== See also ==
- South Ferry (Shelter Island)
- Cross Sound Ferry
- Bridgeport & Port Jefferson Ferry
