= South Ferry (Shelter Island) =

Public ferry service

Coordinates: 41°2′42″N 72°19′2″W

The South Ferry Company, Inc.
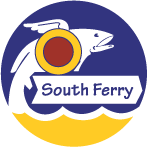

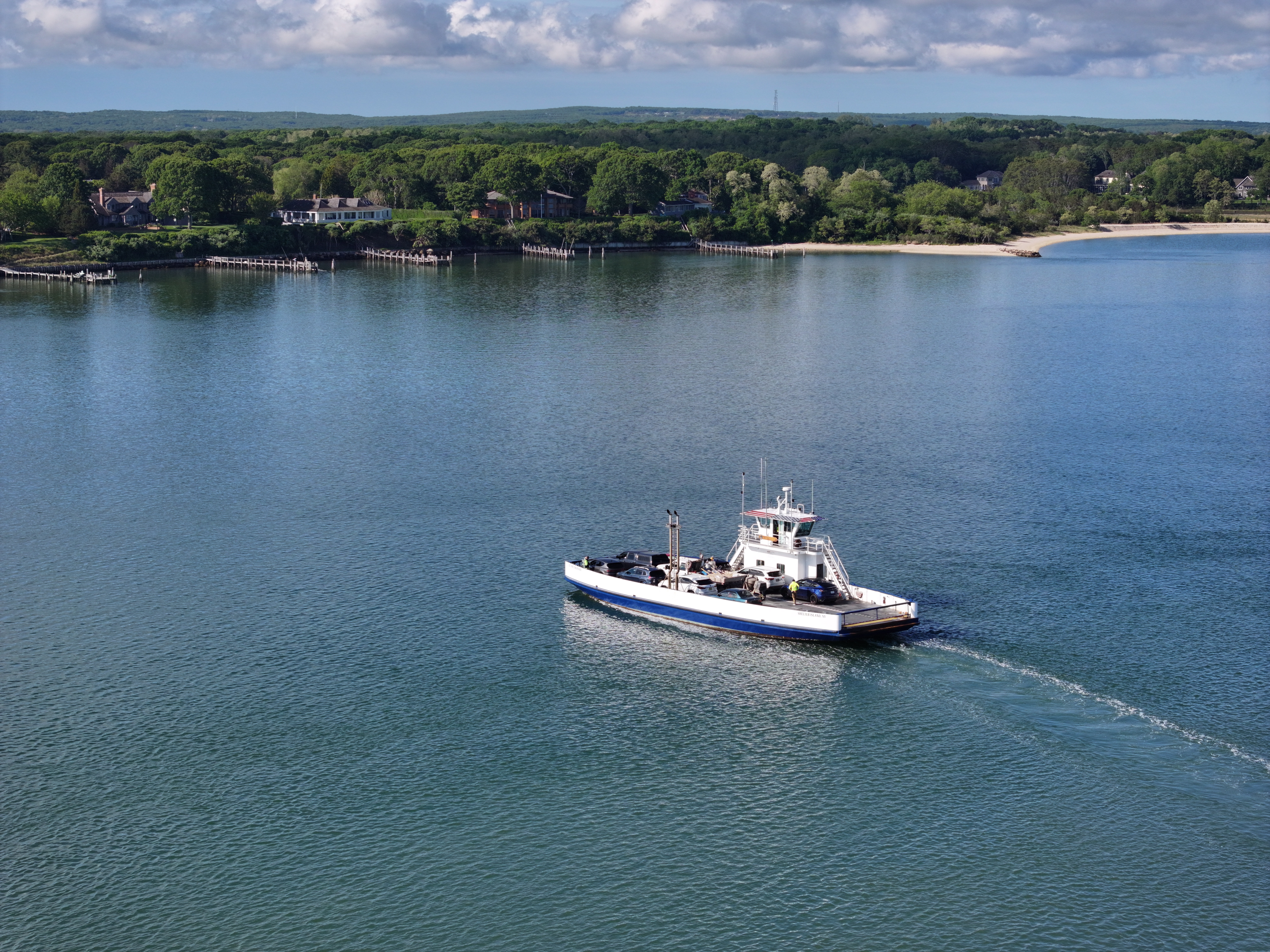
- The South Ferry vessel Lt. Joe Theinert crossing Shelter Island Sound from Shelter Island to North Haven in 2026
- Type: Privately held company
- Industry: Transportation
- Founded: 1830; 196 years ago
- Headquarters: Shelter Island, New York, United States
- Area served: Long Island, New York
- Key people: Clifford Clark, William Clark, Samuel G. Clark
- Products: Ferry service
- Website: www.southferry.com

The South Ferry Company, Inc., locally referred to as the South Ferry or simply South Ferry, is a year-round public ferry service between Shelter Island and North Haven on Long Island, New York. With the similar North Ferry service to Greenport, It forms part of New York State Route 114, which also carries New York State Bicycle Route 114.

== History ==
The service that would become the modern company began in the 1790s, though various forms of informal ferry service had existed in the area for centuries beforehand.

In 1830, Samuel G. Clark, who had already been operating an informal service there for some time, officially founded a company through which he could run the ferry.

The first decades of the company are not well-documented, but the Clark family has owned the company continuously since at least 1845, making it possibly the oldest continuously family-owned ferry service in the United States.

In 1906, the company was formally incorpoated under New York State law.

In 2022, the company was added to the New York State Historic Business Preservation Registry (HBPR).

== Current operations ==
As of 2026, the route is served by 4-6 departures per direction per hour. The ferry runs 18 hours a day in the winter and 19 hours a day in the summer, 365 days a year.

In April 2025, the Shelter Island Reporter estimated that the route carries 1.25 million passengers and 750,000 vehicles annually.

== Fleet ==
=== Current ===
Vessel name	Builder	Delivered	Status
Capt. Bill Clark	Muir Brothers Drydock (Port Dalhousie, Ontario)	1951	Reserve
Lt. Joe Theinert	Chesapeake Shipbuilding (Salisbury, Maryland)	1998	Active
Sunrise	Blount Boats (Warren, Rhode Island)	2002	Active
Southside (recently renamed Capt. Nick Morehead)	Blount Boats (Warren, Rhode Island)	2009	Active
Southern Cross	Blount Boats (Warren, Rhode Island)	2020	Active

=== Past ===
Vessel Name	Delivered	Decommissioned
Capt. Ed Cartwright	1960	2008
North Haven	1959	2008

== See also ==
- North Ferry
- Cross Sound Ferry
- Bridgeport & Port Jefferson Ferry
