= Shelter Island (CDP), New York =

Shelter Island, New York
- Hamlet and census-designated place
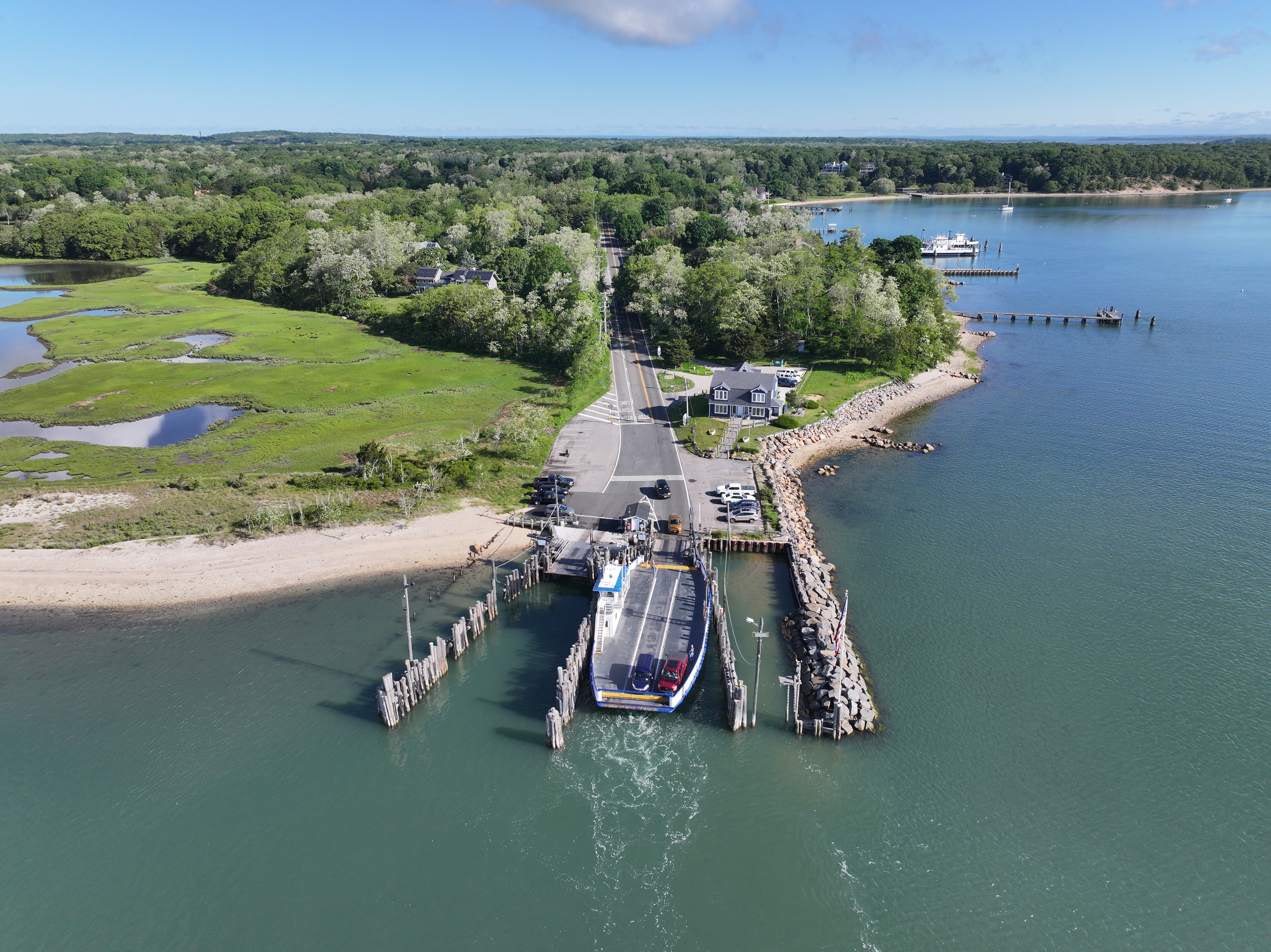
- South Ferry terminal on Shelter Island

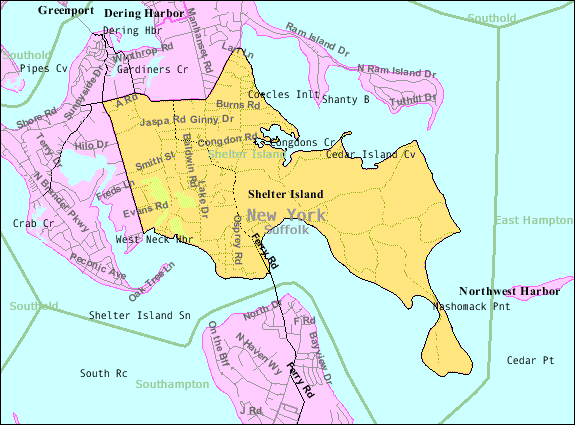
- U.S. Census map of the CDP of Shelter Island

- Location within the state of New York
- Coordinates: 41°3′44″N 72°19′41″W
- Country: United States
- State: New York
- County: Suffolk
- Town: Shelter Island

Area
  - Total: 12.80 sq mi (33.14 km^{2})
  - Land: 6.55 sq mi (16.97 km^{2})
  - Water: 6.24 sq mi (16.17 km^{2})
- Elevation: 52 ft (16 m)

Population (2020)
  - Total: 1,602
  - Density: 244.4/sq mi (94.38/km^{2})
- Time zone: UTC-5 (Eastern (EST))
  - Summer (DST): UTC-4 (EDT)
- ZIP code: 11964
- Area codes: 631, 934
- FIPS code: 36-66828
- GNIS feature ID: 0965036

Shelter Island is a hamlet and census-designated place (CDP) within the Town of Shelter Island in Suffolk County, New York, United States. The population was 1,602 at the time of the 2020 census.

The community is on Shelter Island, between the North and South Forks of Long Island, and is reachable only by ferry. Many of the properties are owned by wealthy New York City residents who use the island as a weekend retreat. Shelter Island is characterized by a quieter and less social lifestyle than that of the nearby Hamptons.

== Geography ==
According to the United States Census Bureau, the CDP has a total area of 6.7 square miles (17.3 km^{2}), of which 6.5 square miles (16.9 km^{2}) is land and 0.15 square miles (0.4 km^{2}), or 2.12%, is water.

== Demographics ==
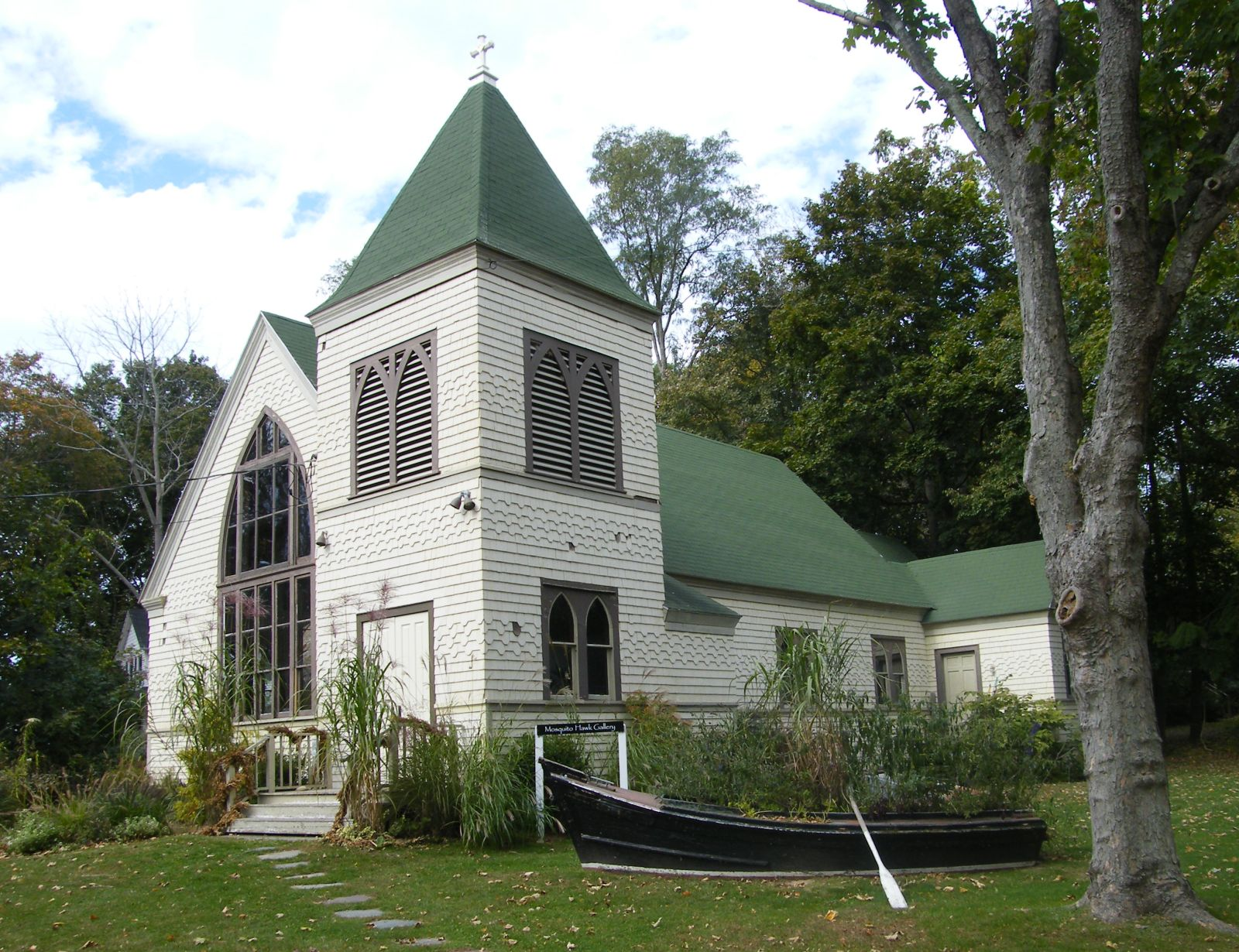
Manhasset church in Shelter Island

Historical population
Census	Pop.	Note	%±
2020	1,602		—
U.S. Decennial Census

As of the census of 2000, there were 1,234 people, 531 households, and 349 families residing in the CDP. The population density was 188.8 inhabitants per square mile (72.9/km^{2}). There were 964 housing units at an average density of 147.5 units per square mile (57.0 units/km^{2}). The racial makeup of the CDP was 94.89% White, 1.05% Black or African American, 0.57% Asian, 0.16% from other races, and 3.32% from two or more races. Hispanic or Latino of any race were 3.24% of the population.

There were 531 households, out of which 23.7% had children under the age of 18 living with them, 53.9% were married couples living together, 8.5% had a female householder with no husband present, and 34.1% were non-families. 27.9% of all households were made up of individuals, and 15.3% had someone living alone who was 65 years of age or older. The average household size was 2.32 and the average family size was 2.86.

In the CDP, the population was spread out, with 20.7% under the age of 18, 4.6% from 18 to 24, 24.9% from 25 to 44, 26.8% from 45 to 64, and 22.9% who were 65 years of age or older. The median age was 45 years. For every 100 females, there were 95.3 males. For every 100 females age 18 and over, there were 94.0 males.

The median income for a household in the CDP was $43,625, and the median income for a family was $55,764. Males had a median income of $40,493 versus $34,688 for females. The per capita income for the CDP was $27,202. About 4.9% of families and 9.0% of the population were below the poverty line, including 19.4% of those under age 18 and none of those age 65 or over.

== Education ==
The school district for the census-designated place is Shelter Island Union Free School District.
