= USS LST-510 =

1944 LST-491-class tank landing ship

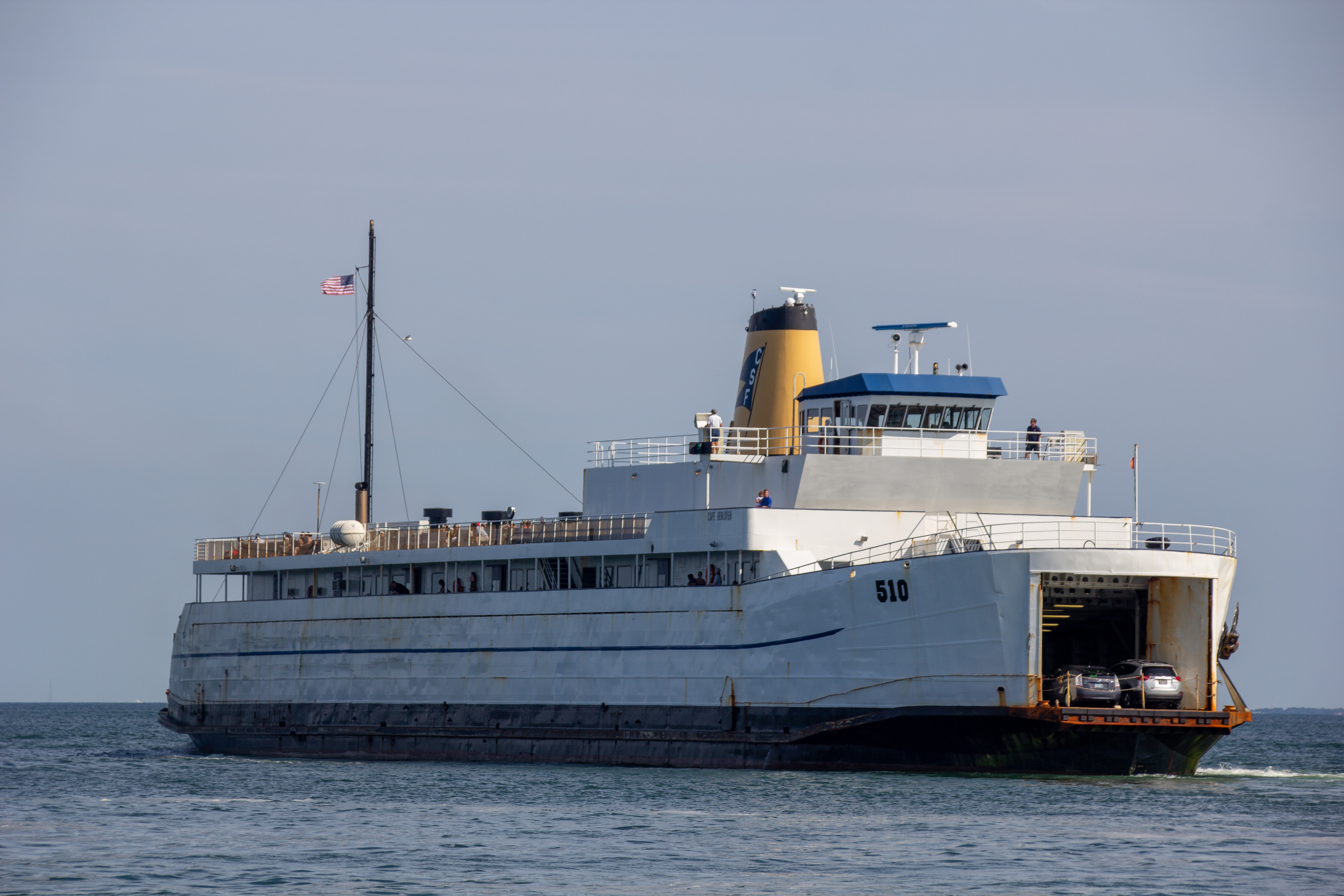
- Cape Henlopen seen arriving in New London in August 2021

History

United States
- Name: Buncombe County (LST-510)
- Builder: Jeffersonville Boat and Machine Company, Jeffersonville, Indiana
- Laid down: 27 September 1943
- Launched: 30 November 1943
- Commissioned: 31 January 1944
- Decommissioned: 1 July 1946
- Renamed: USS Buncombe County, 1 July 1955
- Stricken: 1 November 1958
- Identification: IMO number: 5381978; MMSI number: 367354360; Callsign: WM5958
- Honours and awards: 1 battle star (World War II)
- Fate: Sold into commercial service as a ferry, 1960 or 1961. Renamed MV Virginia Beach. When sold to the Delaware River and Bay Authority in 1964, was renamed MV Cape Henlopen.
- Status: Active

General characteristics
- Class & type: LST-491-class tank landing ship
- Displacement: 1,625 long tons (1,651 t) light; 3,640 long tons (3,698 t) full
- Length: 328 ft (100 m)
- Beam: 50 ft (15 m)
- Draft: Unloaded : 2 ft 4 in (0.71 m) forward; 7 ft 6 in (2.29 m) aft; Loaded : 8 ft 2 in (2.49 m) forward; 14 ft 1 in (4.29 m) aft
- Depth: 8 ft (2.4 m) forward; 14 ft 4 in (4.37 m) aft (full load)
- Propulsion: 2 × General Motors 12-567 diesel engines, two shafts, twin rudders
- Speed: 12 knots (22 km/h; 14 mph)
- Boats & landing craft carried: 2 LCVPs
- Troops: Approximately 130 officers and enlisted men
- Complement: 8-10 officers, 89-100 enlisted men
- Armament: 1 × single 3"/50 caliber gun mount; 8 × 40 mm guns; 12 × 20 mm guns

USS Buncombe County (LST-510) is an LST-491-class tank landing ship built for the United States Navy during World War II and participated in the Normandy landings. Named for Buncombe County, North Carolina, she was the only U.S. Naval vessel to bear the name. She currently serves as a ferry between New London, Connecticut, and Orient, Long Island.

== Construction ==
LST-510 was laid down on 27 September 1943 at Jeffersonville, Indiana, by the Jeffersonville Boat and Machine Company; launched on 30 November 1943; sponsored by Mrs. C. P. Watson; and placed in reduced commission on 18 January 1944. Departing her builders' yard three days later, on 21 January, LST-510 proceeded down the Mississippi River to New Orleans, where she was placed in full commission on 31 January 1944.

== Service history ==
=== Convoy to the United Kingdom, April 1944 ===
After fitting out, LST-510 carried out an abbreviated shakedown cruise to the vicinity of Panama City, Florida, returning to New Orleans in February for post-shakedown availability. On 1 March LST-510 loaded the 150-ton tank landing craft USS LCT-709 onto her upper deck. She then headed to New York City, where she embarked additional crewmen and took on board 600 tons of ammunition. From there, she proceeded via Boston to Halifax, Nova Scotia, and then left North American waters on 29 March in a 64-ship convoy. Like most passages of the North Atlantic during World War II, this one proved hazardous and chilling, both in the physical and the psychological sense. In one three-day period, she endured fog, sleet, and a wind that drove 50-foot (15 m) waves over her bow, and the occasional iceberg. U-boats caused the most concern for the convoy, torpedoing four ships in the convoy, one of them just 400 yards (370 m) away on LST-510's port quarter. On one occasion, maneuvers to evade the unseen enemy briefly threw the convoy into disorder in dense fog. To make matters worse, LST-510's engines broke down. All on board shared the certain fear that a torpedo would soon set off her explosive cargo until successful repairs allowed her to resume her harried voyage. LST-510 reached Derry, Northern Ireland safely on 13 April.

=== Invasion of Normandy, June 1944 ===
From there, LST-510 crossed the Irish Sea and stopped briefly at Milford Haven, Wales before proceeding on to Plymouth, England, where she delivered LCT-709. During May, 1944 LST-510 outfitted at Falmouth and Fowey for her next mission while "scuttlebutt" over the nature of that assignment flew furiously. Orders to load vehicles only heightened the excitement and accelerated the pace of work. Then, on 1 June 1944, LST-510 embarked 200 men and 70 vehicles of the 29th Infantry Division, and the ship backed out into the bay and anchored. From that moment on, no one was allowed off the ship. At 0337 on 4 June, LST-510 weighed anchor and got underway, bound for the coast of France, but put about to return to Plymouth when foul weather compelled postponement. Finally, at 0355 on 5 June, LST-510 again shaped a course for France. By daybreak, LST-510 had formed up with Convoy B 1 of the 4,000-vessel Western Task Force. Neither LST-510 nor her embarked soldiers took part in the initial assault at Normandy. The invasion was already eight hours old when she began approaching Omaha Beach, near Vierville. She could not get all the way in to the beach itself, so LST-510 unloaded her cargo and disembarked her men via LCTs and "Rhino" pontoon barges. That night, LST-510 endured her first air raid, but her only loss proved to be sleep. The raids continued sporadically throughout the night. Even before all of LST-510's cargo had been unloaded, she began embarking wounded men for treatment. The three doctors on board performed their work in a "magnificent" manner, "in the face of existing conditions," laboring throughout the night on the ship's tank deck where an operating room had been set up.

=== Channel operations, June 1944–June 1945 ===
In the next three months, LST-510 shuttled between the Isle of Portland and Weymouth, England, and Utah or Omaha Beach, transporting troops and vehicles eastward and casualties westward across the English Channel. In late September, on her 21st passage across the channel, LST-510 beached over a hollow on the bottom which produced abnormal stresses on her hull, throwing her starboard shaft out of alignment. Forced to return to England on one engine, the tank landing ship was drydocked for repairs at Plymouth for a month. LST-510 spent the first half of November, 1944 at anchor off Le Havre with a low-priority cargo waiting word to move inshore. Following two voyages to Rouen, the ship was proceeding to Cherbourg when she hit an underwater obstruction which holed her hull, flooding both engine rooms and plunging the ship into darkness. The next day, in tow of another LST, the ship headed back to Portland for temporary repairs, and to Falmouth for another month of drydocking and engine repairs. Even after that, bad luck continued to dog LST-510. On 5 February 1945 while returning from Le Havre in a dense fog, she collided bow-to-bow with SS Chapel Hill Victory south of the Isle of Wight, demolishing her own bow as far aft as frame 10. The pea-soup fog had nullified the efforts of her bow lookouts who had but a few seconds warning as the "Victory ship" loomed out of the murk. One of LST-510's bow lookouts died in the mishap. Drydocked at Falmouth until mid-May, LST-510 finally left Plymouth for the United States on 7 June 1945.

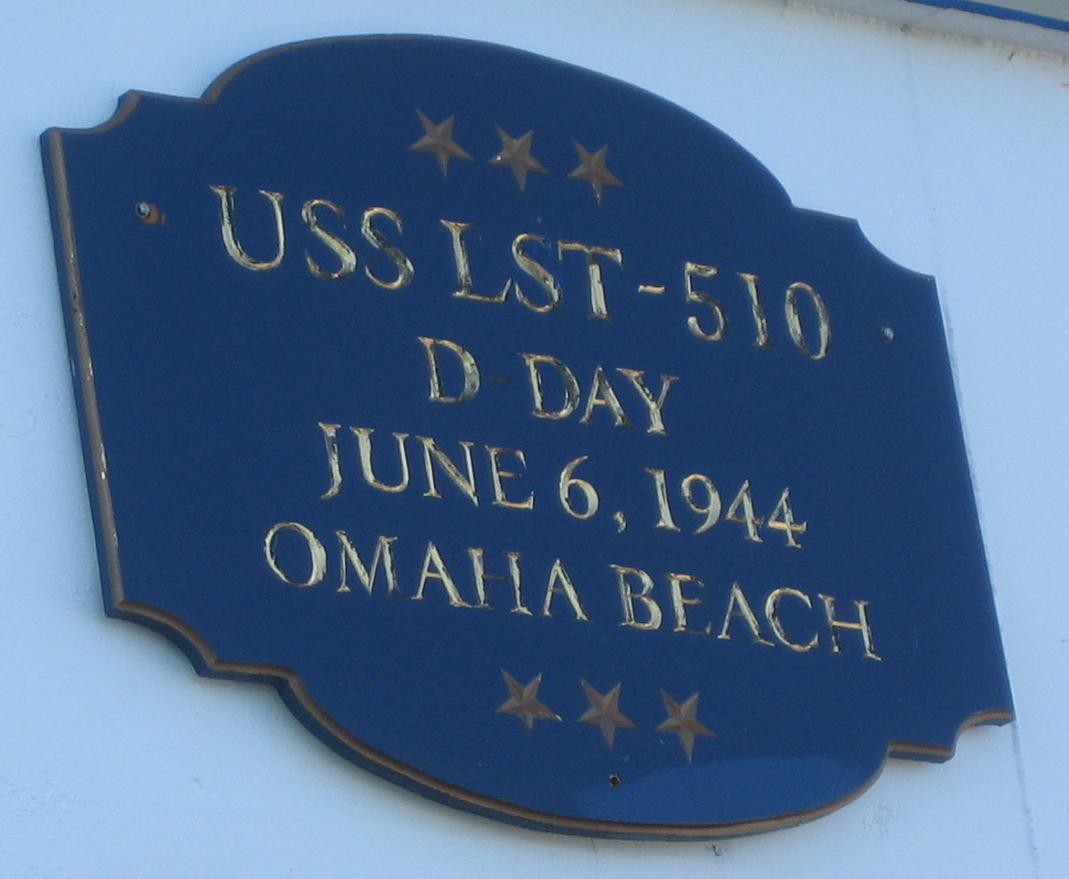
A commemorative plaque aboard Cape Henlopen, acknowledging her D-Day service.

=== Return to the US, June 1945 ===
After touching at Norfolk, Virginia, the tank landing ship proceeded via New Orleans to Galveston, Texas, where she prepared for Pacific service. However, Japan's capitulation in August 1945 cancelled plans for her journey to the Pacific. Instead, LST-510 reported to Green Cove Springs, Florida, where she was placed out of commission on 1 July 1946.

LST-510 received one battle star for her World War II service.

=== Decommissioning and sale ===
Inactive for over a decade, she was named USS Buncombe County (LST-510) on 1 July 1955. Deemed "unfit for further Naval service" on 27 October 1958, her name was struck from the Naval Vessel Register on 1 November 1958.

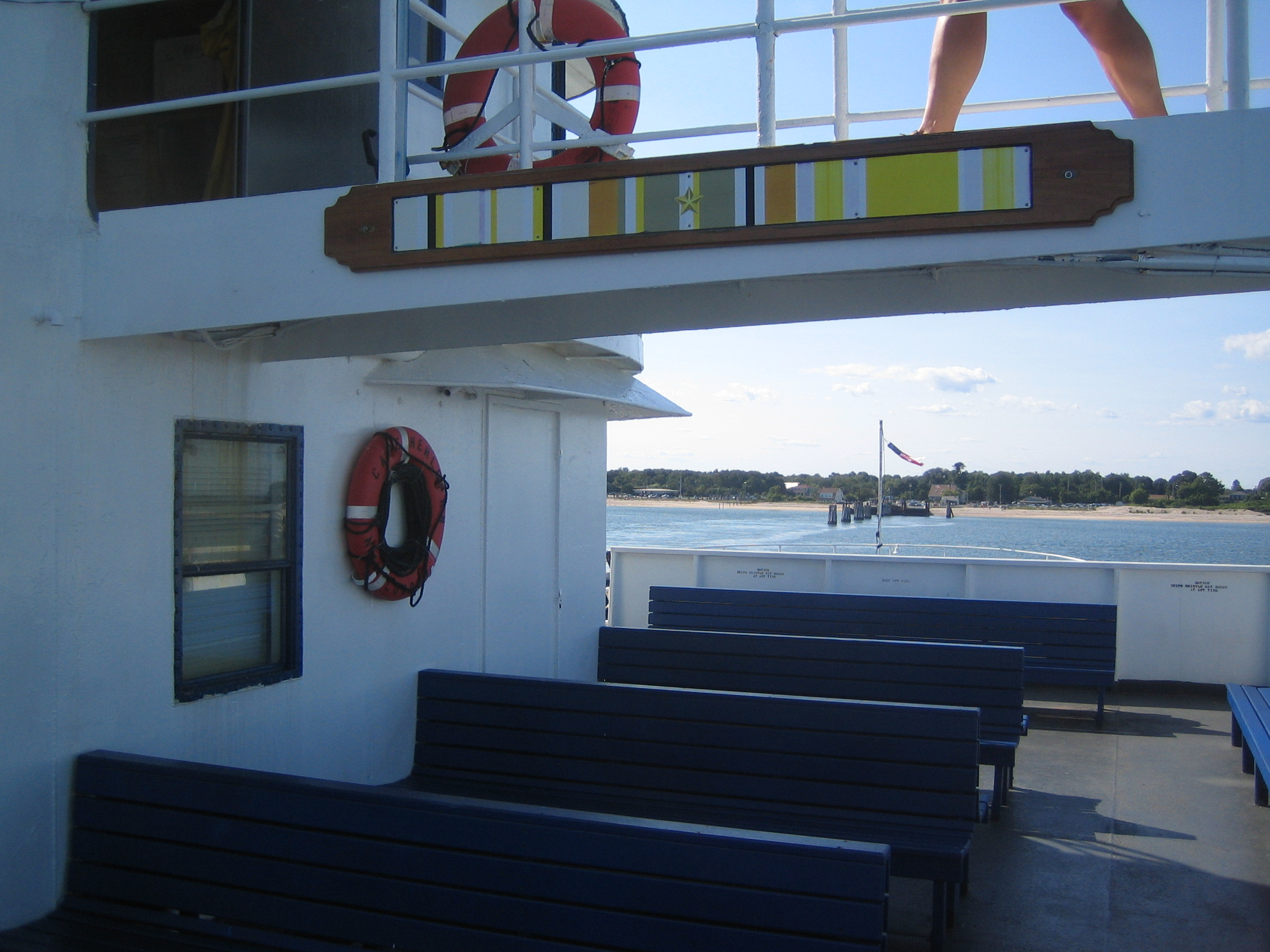
Passenger deck of the Cape Henlopen prior to her 2019 renovation. The award ribbons she earned during World War II are on display.

In 1960, the ship was sold to the Chesapeake Bay Ferry District of Norfolk, Virginia, and renamed MV Virginia Beach. Resold in 1964 or 1965 to the Delaware River and Bay Authority, she was renamed MV Cape Henlopen and converted to a passenger and auto ferry in 1966, operating between Lewes, Delaware, and Cape May, New Jersey. Purchased in 1983 by Cross Sound Ferry Services, Inc. of New London, Connecticut, she underwent a total refurbishment before entering service between Orient, New York (Long Island) and New London, perhaps making it the only D-Day veteran ship to still be in active service. The ferry was repowered during the winter of 1995 with EMD 12-645 diesel engines, and repowered again in 2016 with Caterpillar 3516C diesel engines certified to EPA Tier 3 emissions standards. In 2019, the ship underwent a major overhaul, renovating the ships' passenger accommodations and adding a new lounge, honoring the history and service of the ship in World War II.

MV Cape Henlopen is one of the oldest operating ferries in the world and one of the few ships which served in World War II still in active service.

== Awards ==
USS LST-510 received the following awards for its service in World War II -

- American Campaign Medal
- European–African–Middle Eastern Campaign Medal with one battle star
- World War II Victory Medal
