= SS Martha's Vineyard =

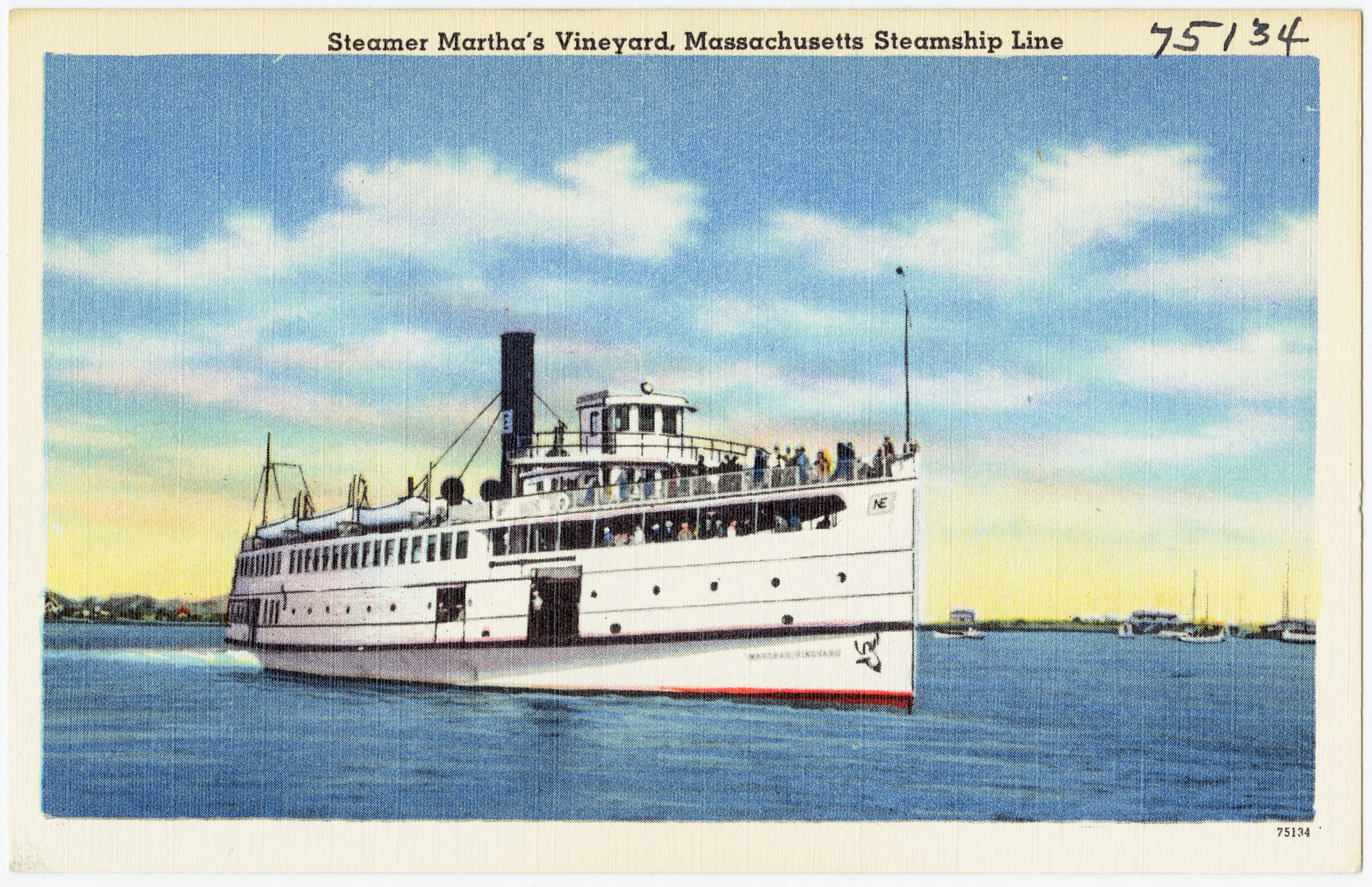
1940s postcard of the Martha's Vineyard

SS Martha's Vineyard was a ferry that operated in New England for much of the 20th century.

She was constructed by Bath Iron Works for the New England Steamship Company (since consolidated into the Woods Hole, Martha's Vineyard and Nantucket Steamship Authority) as the Islander. She was launched on July 23, 1923, and began service to Nantucket Island on August 7. In 1928, she received the name Martha's Vineyard. She operated in regular service for the New England Steamship Company and its successors until October 1956, and she left the company's fleet in 1959. She was purchased by the Rhode Island Steamship Lines and was repowered with new diesel engines before operating seasonally on various routes in Massachusetts, including again to Nantucket from Hyannis under the auspices of Nantucket Express Lines.

In 1968, Martha's Vineyard was sold to the Bridgeport & Port Jefferson Steamboat Company who converted her to diesel-electric and operated her until 1986, when she was replaced by the larger and faster MV Park City. She was subsequently sold to the Massachusetts Bay Lines, which intended to convert her to a dinner cruise ship. However, the company did not fulfill the plans, and Martha's Vineyard was stored in Boston until 1990 when she sank at her dock and was scrapped.
