= North Haven, New York =

- Village
- Incorporated Village of North Haven
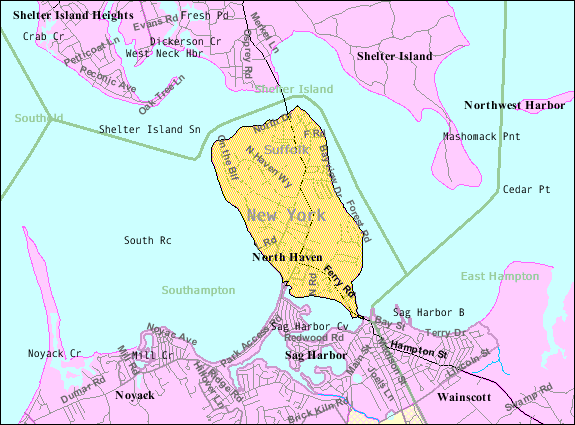
- U.S. Census map of North Haven

- Official seal of North Haven

- Location in Suffolk County and the state of New York

- Location on Long Island Location within the state of New York
- Coordinates: 41°1′13″N 72°18′44″W
- Country: United States
- State: New York
- County: Suffolk
- Town: Southampton
- First settled: 1665
- Incorporated: 1931

Area
  - Total: 2.65 sq mi (6.87 km^{2})
  - Land: 2.65 sq mi (6.87 km^{2})
  - Water: 0 sq mi (0.00 km^{2})
- Elevation: 20 ft (6 m)

Population (2020)
  - Total: 1,162
  - Density: 437.9/sq mi (169.08/km^{2})
- Time zone: UTC-5 (Eastern (EST))
  - Summer (DST): UTC-4 (EDT)
- ZIP code: 11963
- Area codes: 631, 934
- FIPS code: 36-52188
- GNIS feature ID: 0958809
- Website: www.northhavenny.gov

North Haven is a village in the Town of Southampton in Suffolk County, on the South Fork of Long Island, in New York, United States. The population was 1,162 at the time of the 2020 census.

== History ==
The area that now consists of North Haven was first settled by Europeans in 1665. The village incorporated itself in 1931.

In January 2007, Robert W. Rust – a former assistant U.S. attorney decorated for helping save the life of President John F. Kennedy almost three years before he was assassinated – placed his 55-acre (220,000 m^{2}) waterfront estate in the village of North Haven onto the market for $80 million. The property went unsold, and was taken off the market because the listing had expired at the end of September.

== Geography ==
According to the United States Census Bureau, the village has a total area of 2.7 square miles (7.0 km^{2}), all land.

== Demographics ==
Historical population
Census	Pop.	Note	%±
1880	100		—
1940	131		—
1950	153		16.8%
1960	450		194.1%
1970	694		54.2%
1980	738		6.3%
1990	713		−3.4%
2000	743		4.2%
2010	833		12.1%
2020	1,162		39.5%
U.S. Decennial Census

As of the census of 2000, there were 743 people, 337 households, and 209 families residing in the village. The population density was 274.2 inhabitants per square mile (105.9/km^{2}). There were 578 housing units at an average density of 213.3 per square mile (82.4/km^{2}). The racial makeup of the village was 98.38% White, 0.40% African American, 0.67% Asian, and 0.54% from two or more races. 1.48% of the population were Hispanic or Latino of any race.

There were 337 households, out of which 19.6% had children under the age of 18 living with them, 54.9% were married couples living together, 5.6% had a female householder with no husband present, and 37.7% were non-families. 30.9% of all households were made up of individuals, and 18.1% had someone living alone who was 65 years of age or older. The average household size was 2.20 and the average family size was 2.77.

In the village, the population was spread out, with 17.4% under the age of 18, 3.5% from 18 to 24, 22.3% from 25 to 44, 28.7% from 45 to 64, and 28.1% who were 65 years of age or older. The median age was 50 years. For every 100 females, there were 86.7 males. For every 100 females age 18 and over, there were 82.7 males.

The median income for a household in the village was $74,583, and the median income for a family was $81,363. Males had a median income of $51,319 versus $41,875 for females. The per capita income for the village was $38,865. 1.8% of the population and 0.5% of families were below the poverty line. Out of the total population, 0.8% of those under the age of 18 and 3.0% of those 65 and older were living below the poverty line.

== Government ==
As of July 2022, the Mayor of North Haven is Chris Fiore, the Deputy Mayor is Claas Abraham, and the Village Trustees are E. Dianne Skilbred, Terie Diat and Peter Boody.

== Education ==
The village is served by the Sag Harbor Union Free School District.

== Notable people ==
- Robert W. Rust – Former assistant U.S. attorney.
- Julie Andrews – Actress.
- Richard Gere – Actor.
- Carl Bernstein – Journalist and Author.

== See also ==
- List of municipalities in New York
- Sag Harbor, New York
