= Robert W. Rust =

American politician (1928–2024)

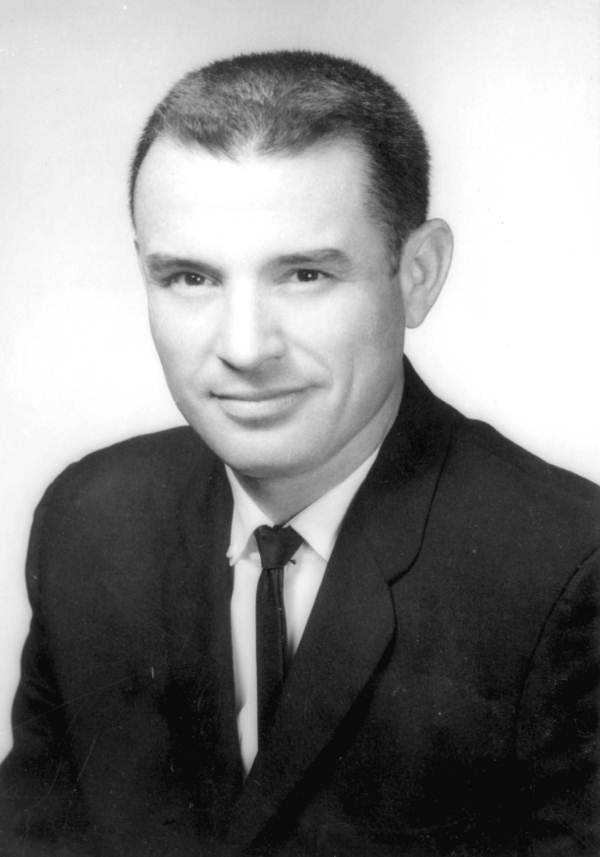

Member of the Florida House of Representatives from the 80th district
- In office 1966–1968

Personal details
- Born: August 16, 1928 Jamaica, New York, U.S.
- Died: September 1, 2024 (aged 96)
- Party: Republican
- Education: University of Miami
- Occupation: Attorney

Col. Robert Warren Rust (August 16, 1928 – September 1, 2024) was born in Jamaica, Queens County, New York, and raised on Long Island. He was appointed US Attorney for the Southern District of Florida, and was sworn in on December 29, 1969, Miami, Florida. Earlier he was a legislator representing Palm Beach and Martin Counties, West Palm Beach, Florida. A Republican, he served in the Florida House of Representatives from 1966 to 1968, representing the 80th district.

Rust died at home on September 1, 2024, in Coral Gables, Florida, at the age of 96. Surrounded by family and friends, Col. Rust was given full military honors and buried at Arlington National Cemetery on Friday, March 7, 2025. A celebration of life dinner reception was held at the National Museum of the Marine Corps in Triangle, Virginia, to remember and honor his lifetime of service and support for his fellow Marines.
