= Shelter Island Sound =

Body of water in Suffolk County, New York, United States

Coordinates: 41°01′42″N 72°21′39″W

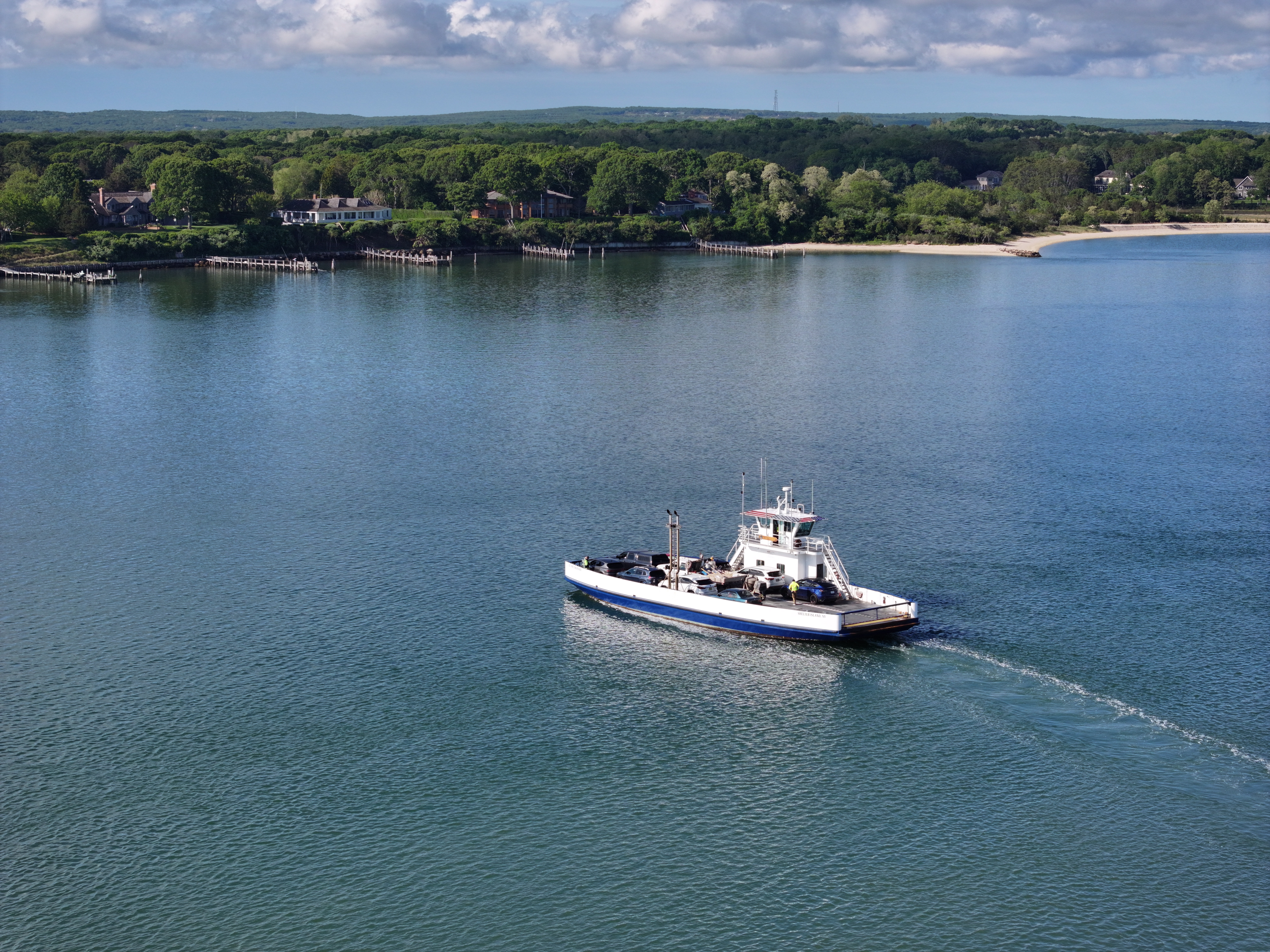
A South Ferry vessel crossing Shelter Island Sound from Shelter Island to North Haven

Shelter Island Sound is a body of water in Suffolk County, New York, at the eastern end of Long Island, between the North and South Forks of Long Island, adjoining Shelter Island. The bay is surrounded by Little Peconic Bay to the west, Noyack Bay to the south, and Gardiners Bay to the east.
