= Cross Sound Ferry =

Ferry Service Company

Coordinates: 41.233°N 72.142°W

Cross Sound Ferry Block Island Express
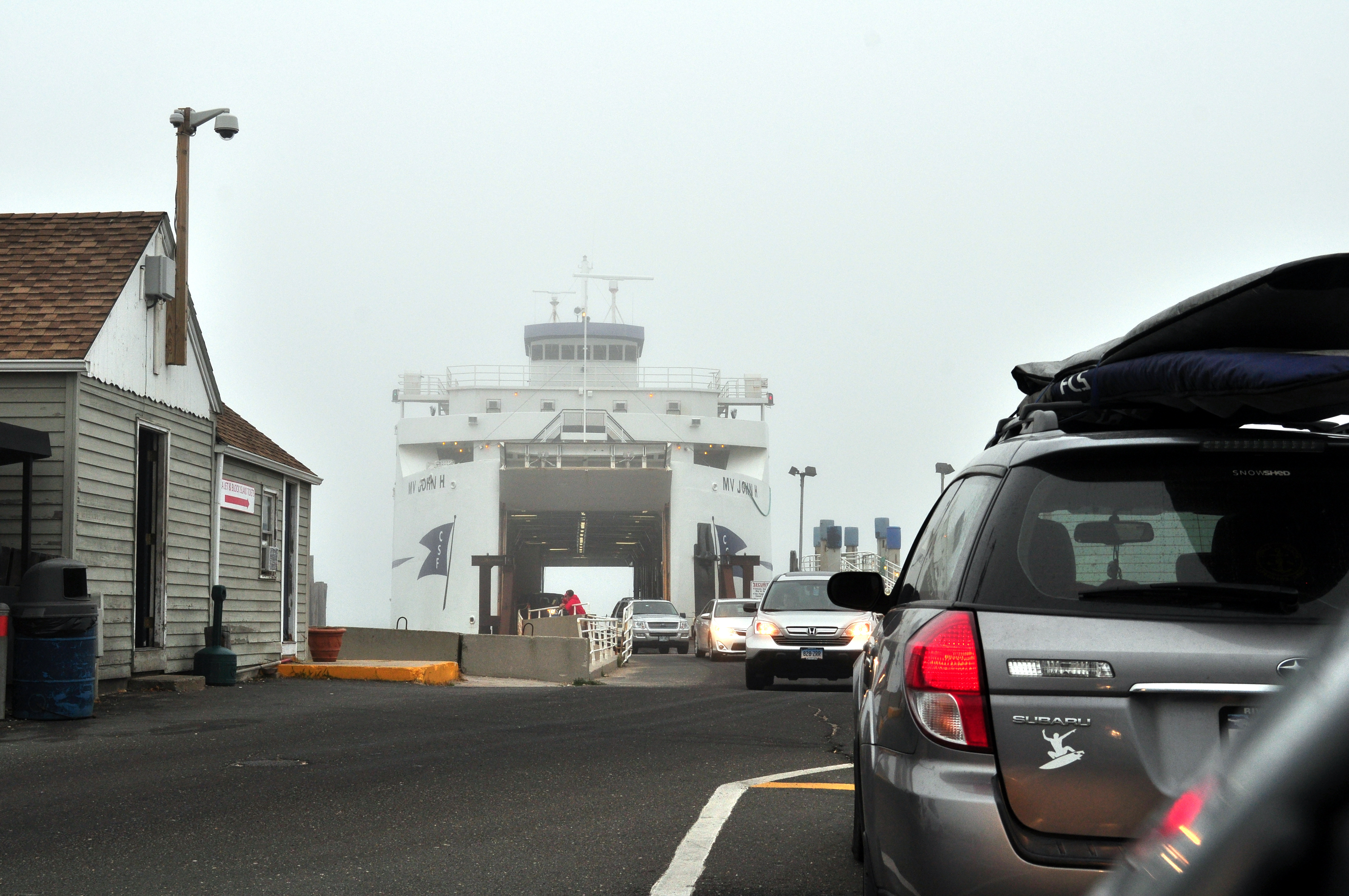
- MV John H offloading at Orient Point

Overview
- Owner: John P. Wronowski, Adam Wronowski
- Area served: Long Island North Fork, Southeastern Connecticut, Block Island
- Locale: Long Island Sound; Block Island Sound
- Transit type: Ferry
- Headquarters: New London, Connecticut
- Website: www.longislandferry.com www.goblockisland.com

Operation
- Began operation: 1975 (Cross Sound); 2004 (Block Island)
- Operators: Cross Sound Ferry Services; Block Island Ferry Services
- Number of vehicles: 10 ferry vessels

Cross Sound Ferry is a passenger and road vehicle ferry service operating across the Long Island Sound between New London, Connecticut, on the mainland and Orient, New York, on Long Island.

The service is privately owned and operated by Cross Sound Ferry Services, headquartered in New London and run by the Wronowski family, which also owns and operates the Block Island Express ferry service and the Thames Shipyard and Repair Company.

== Overview ==
Though there have been multiple proposals to bridge the Long Island Sound at various locations, none have ever come to fruition. Therefore, Long Island motorists located east of the Throgs Neck Bridge heading toward Connecticut must first drive west into Queens, cross one of the three city bridges to the Bronx, and then drive east to reach New England destinations. This circuitous route could, at the extreme, add as many as 200 miles (320 km) to a trip between Long Island and New London, points north, or points east. In addition to the saving in mileage, use of Cross Sound avoids heavy urban traffic in New York City and on Interstate 95 in Connecticut.

The ferry serves over one million passengers annually, about half of whom live on Long Island.

Cross Sound Ferry previously attempted to establish service between New London and East Hampton, on the South Fork of Long Island. A local ordinance passed by the Town of East Hampton in 1997 prohibits vehicle ferry service within the Town's borders and places limits on the speeds of both passenger vessels and road vehicles. Cross Sound Ferry filed a lawsuit against the town in 2004 to overturn the ruling, which was eventually dismissed.

Cross Sound Ferry operates year-round with up to 32 daily departures with the lone exception of no service on December 25, Christmas Day.

=== Sister companies ===
The Block Island Express, a seasonal high-speed passenger ferry service, operates out of the same New London ferry terminal and services Block Island (New Shoreham, Rhode Island). The Thames Shipyard and Repair Company services both Cross Sound Ferry and Block Island Express vessels. All three organizations share the 2 Ferry Street office at the New London terminal.

The Block Island Express runs through the summer season from June to early September.

The three companies, as well as the Thames Towboat Company, are owned by John P. Wronowski and son, Adam Wronowski.

== Fleet ==
Cross Sound Ferry Services owns a fleet of seven traditional vehicle-passenger ferries (one of which is charter service only), and three High-speed passenger-only ferries. Some of the vessels were built new for Cross Sound Ferry, while others were retrofitted at Cross Sound's sister company, Thames Shipyard and Repair. Block Island Ferry Services has one vessel, serviced at the same shipyard.

=== Active ships ===
Image	Vessel	Year built	Service began	Auto capacity	Passenger capacity	Length	Type	Notes
	Cape Henlopen	1943	1983	80	660	328 ft (Note: According to the Office of Information and Regulatory Affairs, Cape Henlopen was registered in 2022 at 307 ft. This contradicts the 328 ft length cited by the United States Navy.)	ROPAX	Acquired from Delaware River and Bay Authority, built in 1943 as USS LST-510 to serve in D-Day.
	Cecilia Ann	2003	2017	—N/a	600	143 ft	High-speed	Built by Austal Shipyard (Mobile) in 2003 as Zephyr, acquired from Circle Line Sightseeing Cruises, primarily used for lighthouse cruises.
	Jennifer C.	1965	2016	50	300	207 ft	ROPAX	Built by New Bern Shipyard (New Bern) in 1965 as MV Pamlico, acquired in 2015 from North Carolina Department of Transportation Ferry Division.
	Jessica W	1990	2004	—N/a	530	160 ft	High-speed	Operated by Block Island Ferry Services, built in 1990 as Condor 9 acquired from Condor Ferries in 2003.
	John H.	1989	1989	100	1000	230 ft	ROPAX	Largest vessel of the fleet, built 1989 by Eastern Marine Shipyard (Panama City).
	Mary Ellen	1983	2003	85	675	260 ft	ROPAX	Built in 1983 by Offshore Shipbuilding in Palatka Florida as Grand Republic for the Bridgeport & Port Jefferson Ferry. She operated as Grand Republic until she was sold to Cross Sound Ferry in 2003 and was renamed Mary Ellen.
	New London	1979	1979	65	286	247 ft	ROPAX	Built by Thames Shipyard (New London), first new-build vessel of the Cross Sound Ferry.
	Sea Jet I	1989	1995	—N/a	400	110	High-speed	Built by Nichols Brothers Shipyard (Freeland), formerly operated in Hawaii and Catalina Island.
	Susan Anne	1964	1998	80	840	237 ft	ROPAX	Built 1964 by Northumberland Ferries Limited as Prince Nova, originally sailed between Nova Scotia and Prince Edward Island.

=== Former & repurposed ships ===
Image	Vessel	Year built	Service began	Service ended	Auto capacity	Passenger capacity	Length	Notes
	Caribbean (Ferry)	1972	1975?	2025	22	140	120 ft (Note: According to the Office of Information and Regulatory Affairs, Caribbean Ferry was registered in 2022 at 120 ft. Cross Sound Ferry formerly stated in 2007 that she was 128 ft in total length.)	Caribbean served Cross Sound Ferry for at least 50 years before she was purchased in 2025 by a new owner.
	North Star	1968	1984	Repurposed	35	300	168 ft	Built in 1968 (Morgan City) as an offshore supply vessel. The North Star was later acquired by CSF for regular passenger service and is now repurposed for charter services.

== Controversy and incidents ==
Local officials on Long Island's North Fork have criticized Cross Sound Ferry for causing increased vehicle traffic on New York State Route 25 (NY 25), particularly following the addition of its Sea Jet service. The Orient terminal is located at the eastern terminus of NY 25, and all traffic must use NY 25 to get to and from the ferry terminal; travelers coming from points further west must travel through several towns, including Riverhead and Southold in the process. In an attempt to verify this, the Town of Southold commissioned a corridor study in 2007. However, the results of the study found that "the section of [NY 25] in the vicinity of the Cross Sound Ferry currently operates with a Vehicle to Capacity (v/c) ratio of .18. This means that the roadway is currently running at 18% of its total capacity. This also means that the roadway can handle approximately five times the current traffic."

On November 19, 2002, semi-truck driver Michael Zuber was killed by drowning after his semi-truck rolled off the back deck of the Susan Anne while he was asleep behind the wheel after crew members neglected to place wheel chocks behind the back wheels of Zuber's semi-truck. No criminal charges were filed against Cross Sound Ferry or any of its employees, but Zuber's family later filed a wrongful death lawsuit against the ferry company, alleging negligence. The two sides agreed to an out-of-court settlement for $3.2 million in 2008, some six years after the accident.

== Gallery ==
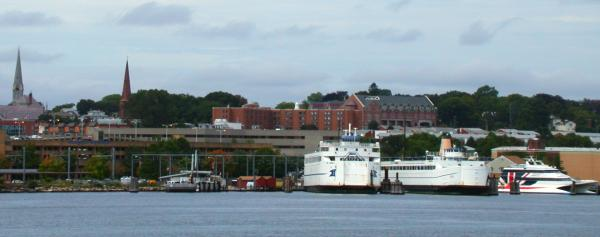
New London ferry terminal

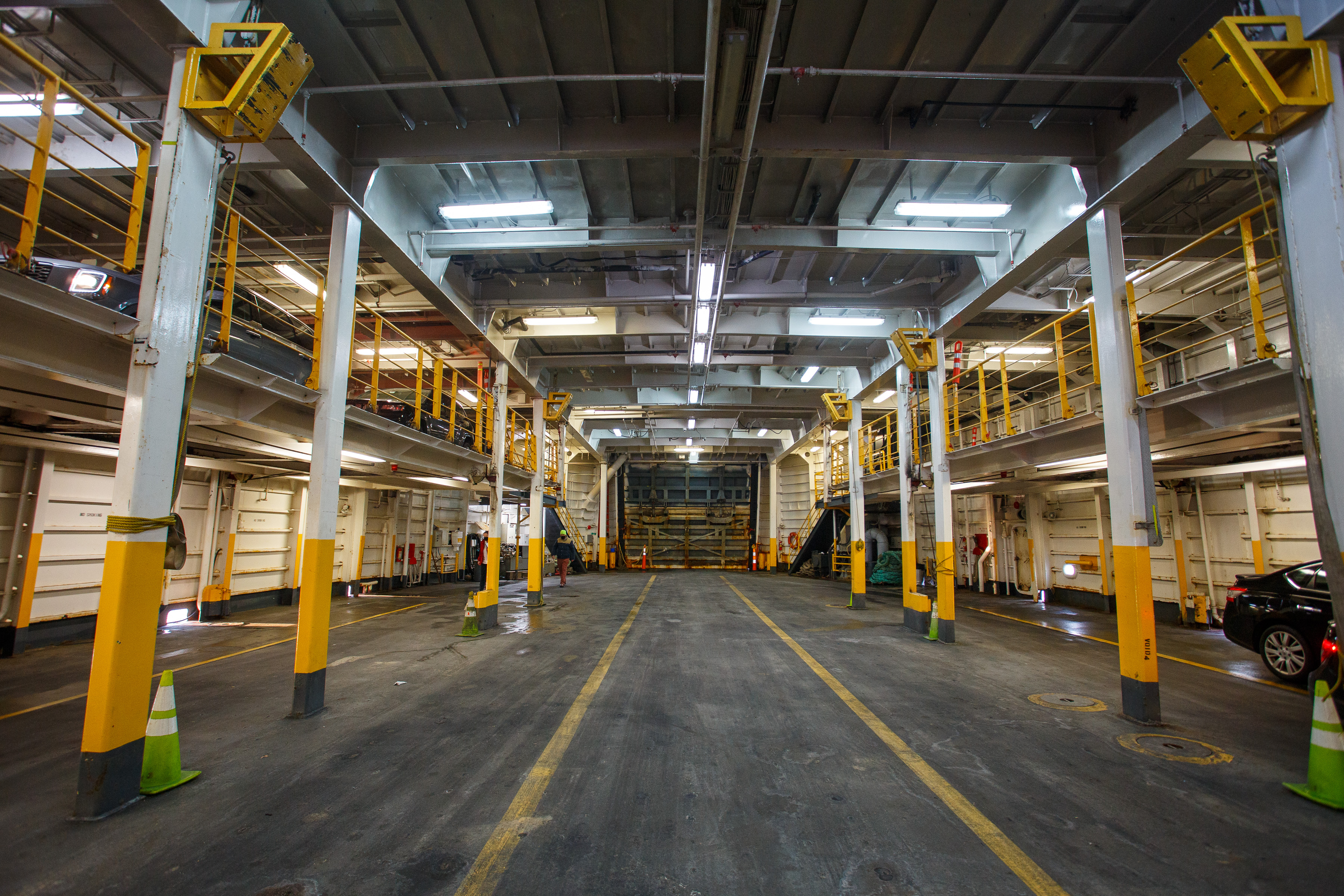
Interior of the John H.

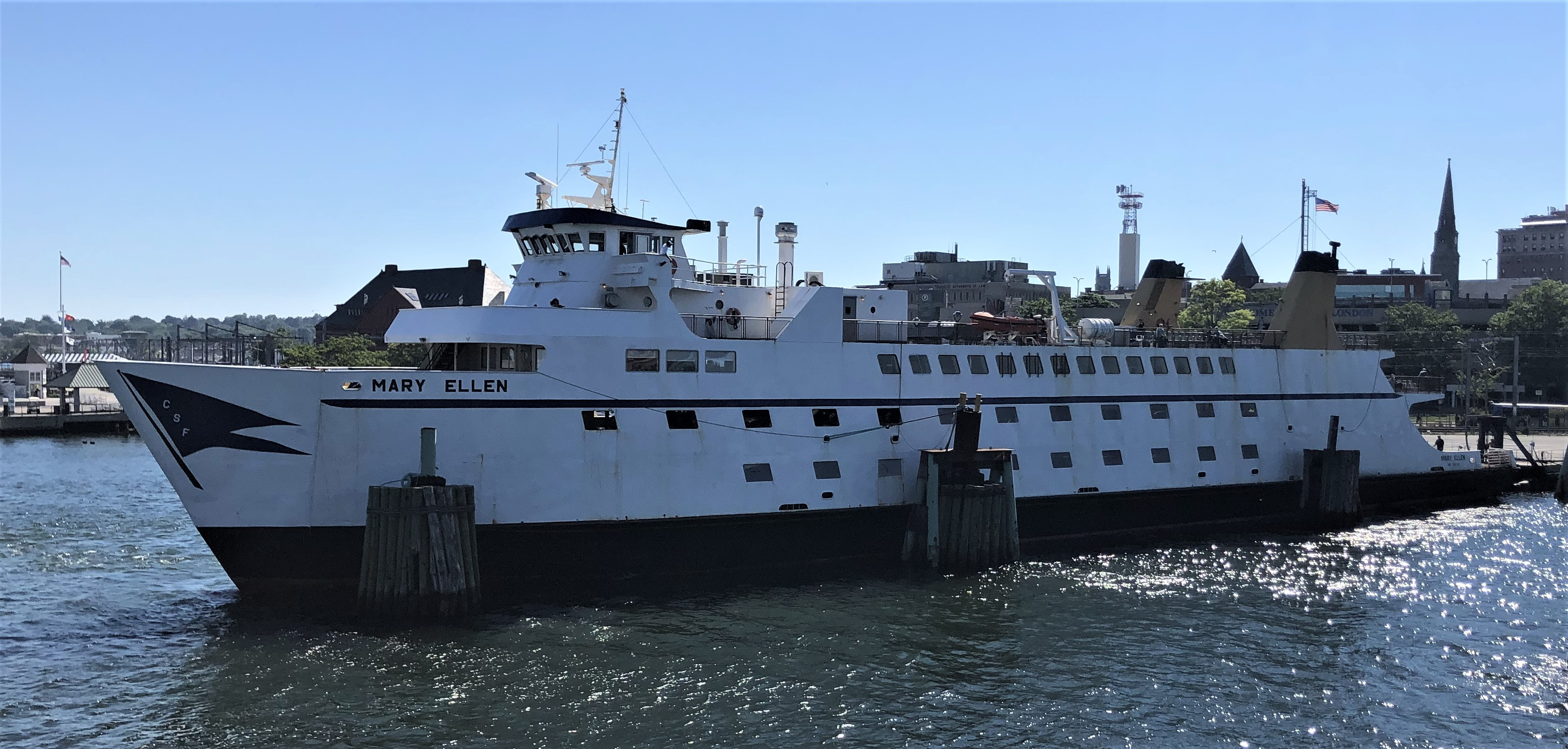
Mary Ellen docked

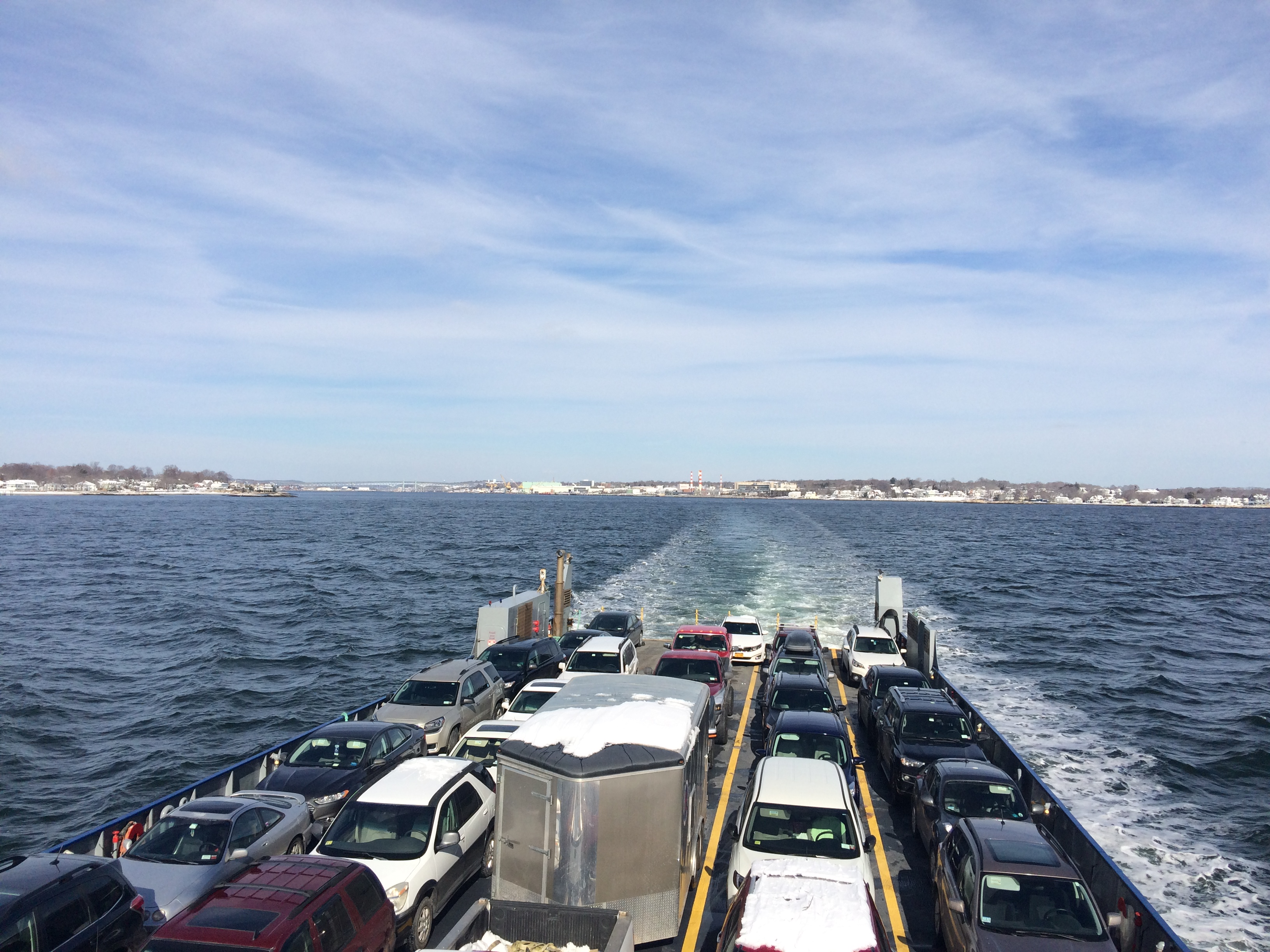
Aboard the New London
