= Bridgeport & Port Jefferson Ferry =

Water transportation service between Long Island and Connecticut

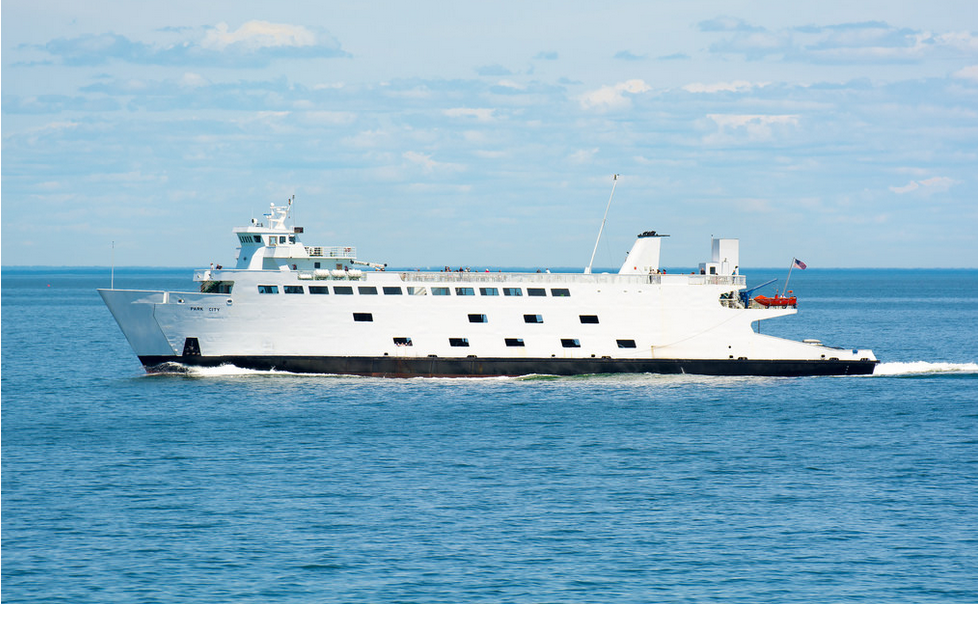
- The MV Park City crossing Long Island Sound during the summer of 2016
- Waterway: Long Island Sound
- Transit type: Passenger and automobile ferry
- Route: Bridgeport, Connecticut–Port Jefferson, New York
- Carries: passengers, bicycles, motorcycles, cars, trucks, and buses of all sizes
- Owner: McAllister Towing and Transportation Co., Inc.
- Began operation: 1883
- Travel time: 1 hour and 15 minutes, one way
- No. of lines: 1
- No. of vessels: 4
- No. of terminals: 2
- Yearly ridership: 1,156,254 (2023)
- Yearly vehicles: 504,332 (2023)
- Website: www.88844ferry.com

The Bridgeport & Port Jefferson Steamboat Company, commonly referred to as the Bridgeport & Port Jefferson Ferry, is a privately owned transportation company that operates a passenger and vehicle ferry service across the Long Island Sound, between the city of Bridgeport, Connecticut, and the Long Island village of Port Jefferson, New York. Founded in 1883, it is one of the oldest continuously operating ferry companies in the United States.

== Service ==
The Bridgeport & Port Jefferson Ferry operates between Port Jefferson, NY and Bridgeport, CT, and the service currently consists of four vessels and two terminals. Each vessel contains a dual-level car deck with capacity ranging from 85 to 120, with capacity often selling out on summer weekends and holiday sailing periods. Onboard amenities include a bar (branded the Steamboat Lounge), food service, restrooms, and both indoor and outdoor seating.

Travel time across Long Island Sound is approximately 1 hour and 15 minutes.

== History ==
The first ferry service began in 1872 and proved popular. The Bridgeport & Port Jefferson Steamboat Company was subsequently founded in 1883 by several backers, including entrepreneur Phineas Taylor Barnum, and Port Jefferson seaman Charles Tooker. The ferry company originally operated steamship service, but the acquisition of the Martha's Vineyard in 1968 ended steamship service. Since then, the company has been referred to in signage and conversation as the Bridgeport & Port Jefferson Ferry, but the term Steamboat Company is still used legally.

Since 1980, the President has been Brian McAllister who also owns one hundred percent of the company's shares. The McAllisters purchased the company in 1960 from Joseph Tooker, Charles Tooker's grandson.

During the 1980s, the ferry company offered year-round service for the first time in company's history. The entrances of the Grand Republic (not to be confused with the current Grand Republic, built in 2003) and the Park City into service in 1983 and 1986, respectively, were each met with skyrocketing ridership.

In 1999, with the entrance of the PT Barnum into service, the ferry company began operating hourly, three-vessel service on weekends, holidays, and during the summer. The ferry company still operates only two vessels on off-season weekdays and during periods of vessel maintenance, with departures every 90 minutes. A new Grand Republic entered service in 2003, while the old one was sold to Cross Sound Ferry and renamed the Mary Ellen.

On May 29, 2009, the United States Court of Appeals for the Second Circuit upheld a United States District Court for the District of Connecticut ruling that the Bridgeport Port Authority was unconstitutionally collecting taxes from the ferry company and passengers and using the tax money for purposes other than for the benefit of the ferry company and passengers. The port authority was ordered to pay the ferry company $1.1 million in damages.

In 2013, the ferry company unveiled plans to move its Bridgeport dock across Bridgeport Harbor to a new and larger terminal on Seaview Avenue at the former site of Turbana Corporation. The city approved the plan in April 2014, and the new terminal was slated to open in 2020; however, due to delays owing to environmental and legal issues and the COVID-19 pandemic, construction on the new terminal has yet to commence as of 2025.

In June 2016, the Bridgeport & Port Jefferson Ferry made significant changes to its ticketing system. Tickets were for many years purchased while on board the vessel (at a purser's booth) and turned in to a crew member before walking or driving off. However, in June 2016, the new ticket system was implemented, where tickets are purchased and turned in before boarding the vessel. Tickets are sold online, over the phone, and inside the terminals. The new tickets contain bar codes, which are scanned prior to boarding, and can also be displayed on a cell phone or mobile device.

=== Incidents ===
On July 26, 2024, the Park City collided with a construction barge after losing propulsion as she was docking in Bridgeport. No injuries occurred, while the Park City suffered minor damage, and re-entered service two weeks later after undergoing repairs.

== Ports ==
The distance between the two ports is approximately 18 miles (29 km). The average crossing is one hour and fifteen minutes in duration.

=== Bridgeport ===
The ferry is located at 330 Water Street on the western bank of Bridgeport Harbor. It is within walking distance of the Arena at Harbor Yard, the Ballpark at Harbor Yard, the Barnum Museum, the Metro-North station, the main GBTA Bus Station, the Klein Memorial Auditorium, and most of downtown. In 2004 a new car loading ramp was installed featuring AASHTO HS-20 truck capacity. The aforementioned proposed new terminal will be located at Barnum Landing on the opposite side of Bridgeport harbor in Bridgeport's East End neighborhood off Seaview Avenue at the former site of Turbana Corporation. The ferry company plans to operate either a shuttle or water taxi between the new terminal and downtown.

=== Port Jefferson ===
The ferry is located at 102 West Broadway at the head of the harbor. A large gold leaf statue of an eagle was erected on the corner of East Broadway and NY 25A in 2002, replacing one of Thomas Jefferson. Located directly across from the dock, it is a monument for victims of 9/11. The ferry is approximately one mile (1.6 km) north of the Port Jefferson LIRR station.

== Current fleet ==
There are currently four vessels in service, each with capacity for 1,000 passengers. Each vessel is configured similarly, with a dual-level car deck ranging in capacity from 95 to 124. Each vessel has a second deck above the car deck containing a small outdoor area near the back, a large passenger cabin (branded the "Steamboat Cafe") with restrooms, seating, and a snack bar (branded the "Steamboat Cafe") in the middle, and a bar serving alcoholic beverages (branded the "Steamboat Lounge") near the front. A third level contains more outdoor seating, as well as the bridge and helm. All four vessels have elevators from the car deck to the second and third levels, located near the back of each vessel. Each vessel is capable of traveling at speeds of 16 knots (18 mph; 30 km/h).

=== MV Park City ===
The MV Park City was built in 1986 by Offshore Shipbuilding in Palatka, Florida at a cost of $5 million. She is 280 feet (85 m) long and 47 feet (14 m) wide with capacity for 95 automobiles.

In 2010, the Park City was re-powered with EPA Tier 2-compliant Caterpillar 3516C engines, and in 2012 she underwent a midlife renovation which gave her a new elevator for handicapped passengers and a complete refurbishment of her main passenger cabin; the 2012 renovation made the Park City ADA-compliant.

=== MV P.T. Barnum ===
The MV PT Barnum was built in 1999 by Eastern Shipbuilding in Panama City, Florida, at a cost of $14 million. She is 300 feet (91 m) long and 52 feet (16 m) wide, has capacity for 120 automobiles, and is named after the ferry company's co-founder, Bridgeport circus impresario PT Barnum. It recently underwent renovation, which included new helm windows, a renovated lounge, renovated bathrooms, updated safety equipment, a replaced elevator, new Tier IV engines, speed enhancements, and better stability, both to enhance the passenger experience, and make it slightly more aligned to the M/V Long Island.

=== MV Grand Republic ===
The MV Grand Republic was built in 2003 by Eastern Shipbuilding in Panama City, Florida, at a cost of $15 million. She was built to the same specifications as the PT Barnum, with only minor mechanical and cosmetic differences between the two vessels. Like the PT Barnum, the Grand Republic is 300 feet long and 52 feet wide and has capacity for 120 automobiles.

=== MV Long Island ===
The MV Long Island, the newest member of the Bridgeport & Port Jefferson Ferry's fleet, was built by Eastern Shipbuilding in Panama City, Florida, and entered service in December 2024. She is 302 feet (92 m) long and 53 feet (16 m) wide and has capacity for 124 automobiles. Externally, she is identical to the P.T. Barnum and Grand Republic, but she boasts several new amenities which the remainder of the fleet lacks, including a designated pet cabin, and a family/unisex restroom.

== Former fleet ==
- Grand Republic The name Grand Republic was previously used for an older and slightly smaller vessel built in 1983. It was built in 1983 by Offshore Shipbuilding in Palatka, FL, who would also build the MV Park City 3 years later (The two boats were built to similar but not identical specifications). It was 280 feet long and 44 feet wide with capacity for 85 cars. It was sold to Cross Sound Ferry in March 2003, who renamed it the Mary Ellen and placed it back in service on their route between New London, Connecticut and Orient, New York that June, where it remains in service as of 2024.
- SS Martha's Vineyard - Before the (1983) Grand Republic, this steel-hulled, diesel-powered ship ran seasonally (no winter service) with six round trips a day from 1968. It was built in Bath, Maine in 1923, and was previously used by the Woods Hole, Martha's Vineyard, and Nantucket Steamship Authority. She had capacity for 35 cars. It was sold in 1986 to Massachusetts Bay Lines following the MV Park City's arrival. Massachusetts Bay Lines intended to convert her into a dinner cruise ship, but never did, and the Martha's Vineyard was ultimately scrapped in 1990.
- Catskill - The Catskill was built in 1924 to replace the Nonowantuc, and was the first steel-hulled vessel in the company's history. It was named after the Catskill mountains in upstate New York. It was sold in 1968 after the Martha's Vineyard was bought.
- Park City - A previous Park City served from 1898 through 1951. Its name was derived from the city of Bridgeport's nickname. Built for $50,000, 28 feet (8.5 m) wide/150 feet (46 m) long 898 gross tons, 800 horsepower, 15 knots. Coal (hard)powered.
- Nonowantuc - The first vessel in the Bridgeport & Port Jefferson Ferry's history, serving from 1883 to 1924. It was slightly smaller than the 1898 Park City, but also featured masts if the boilers failed.

== Gallery ==
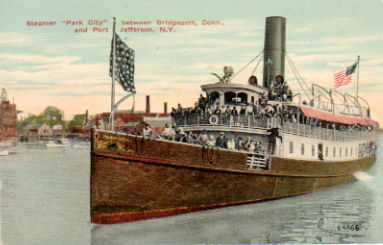
The 1898 Park City Ferry on a postcard

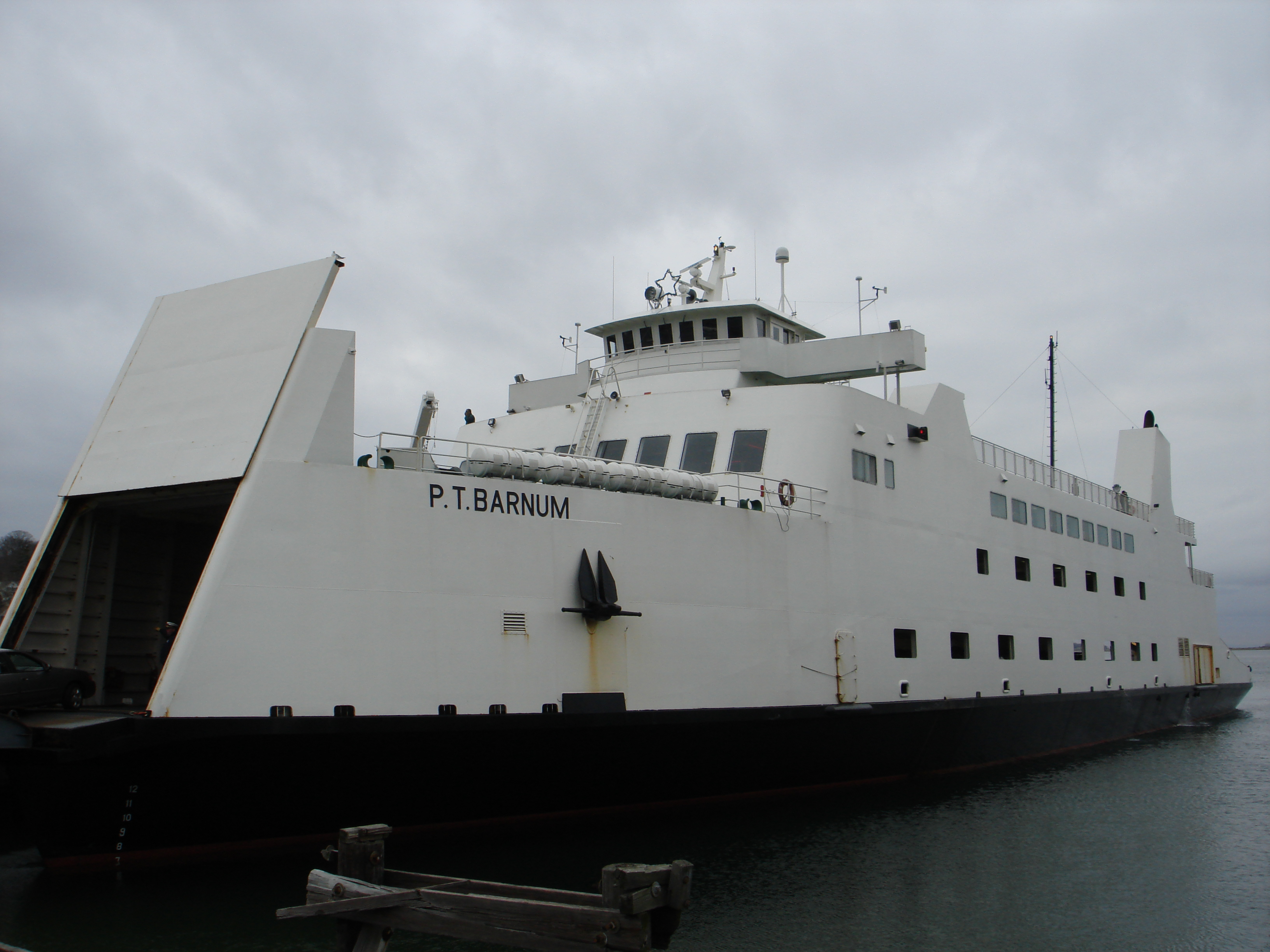
The MV PT Barnum at Port Jefferson Harbor

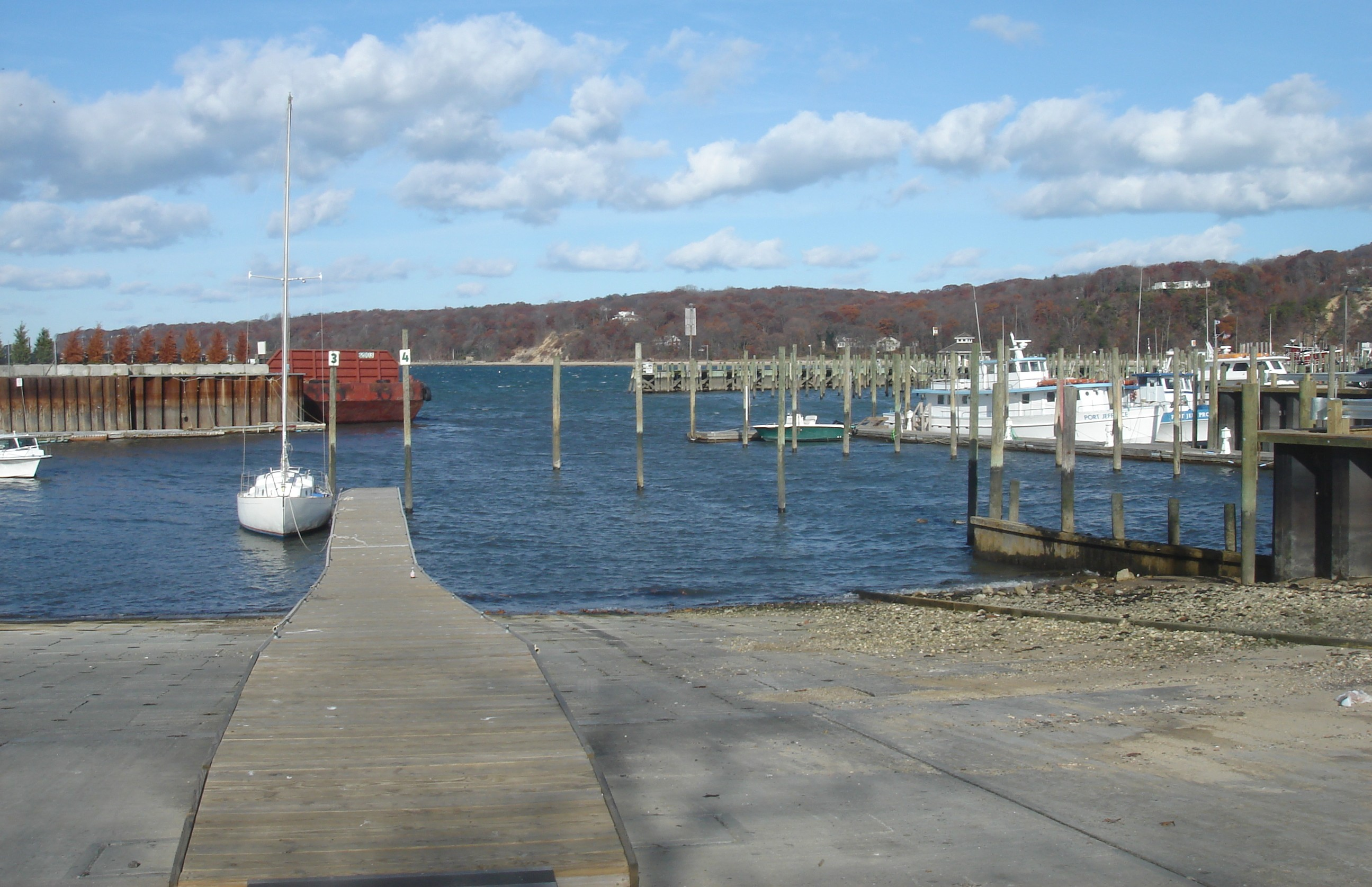
Port Jefferson Harbor

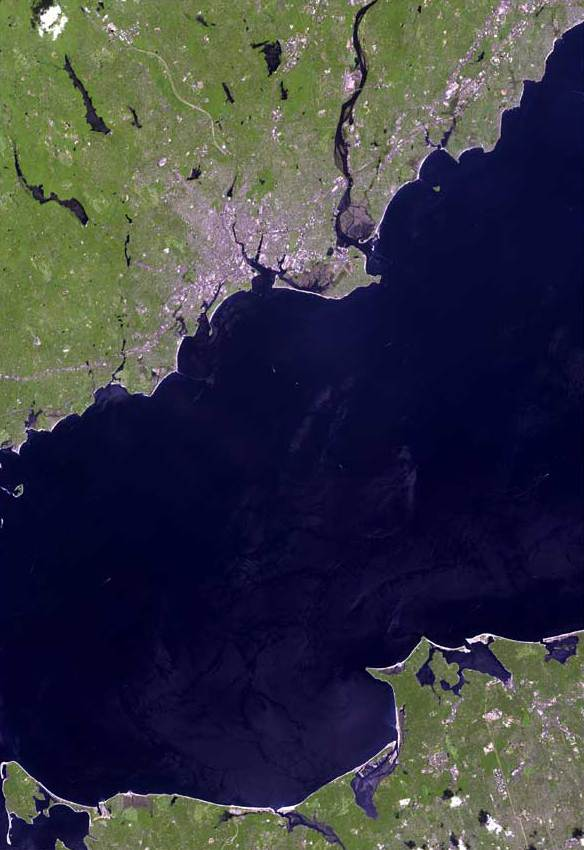
Satellite image of Bridgeport & Port Jefferson

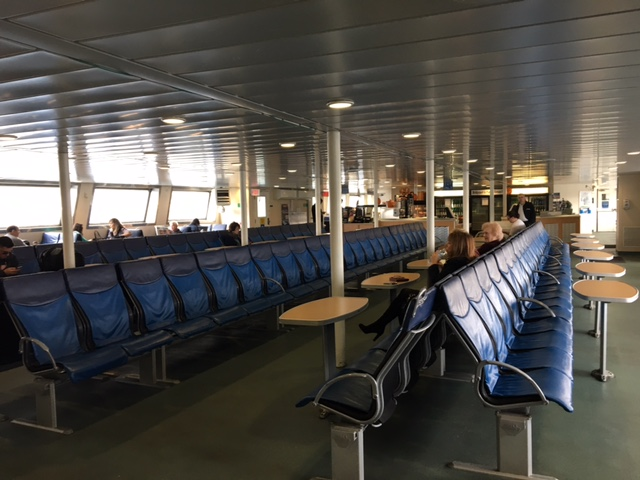
The renovated cabin of the MV Park City

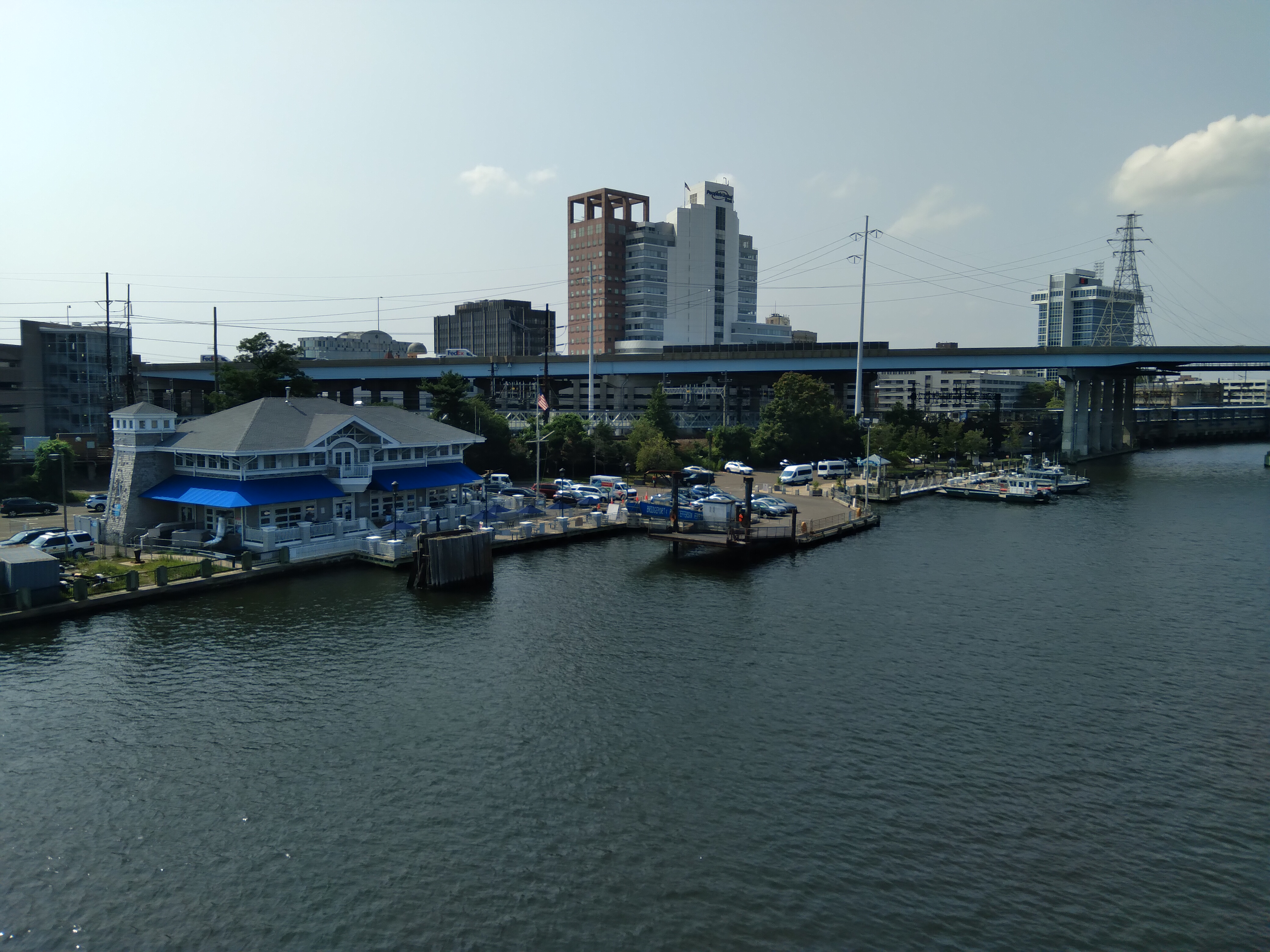
Bridgeport Harbor Dock

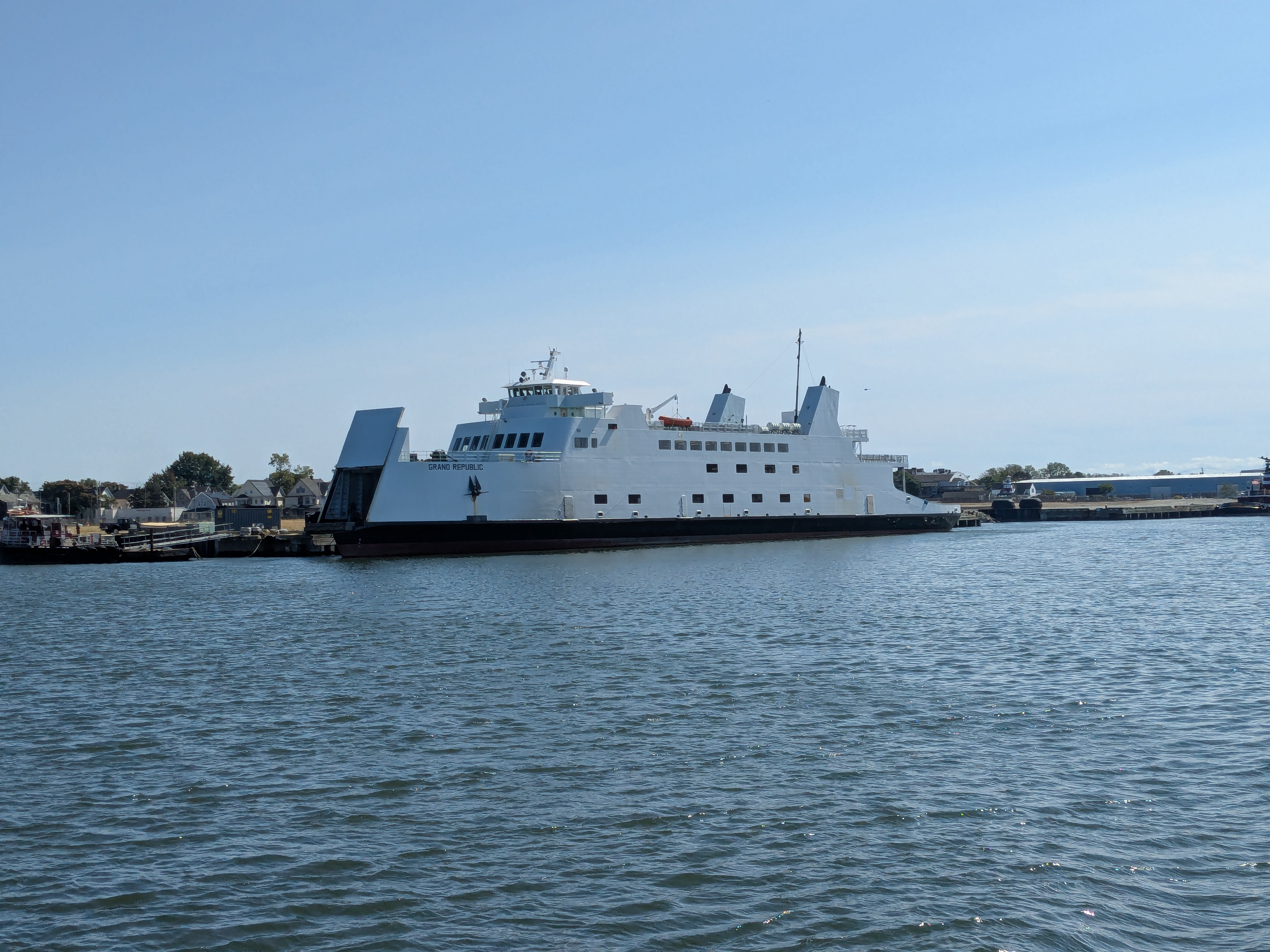
MV Grand Republic docked in Bridgeport, September 2025

== See also ==
- Cross Sound Ferry
- Fire Island Ferries
